= List of Indianapolis Colts broadcasters =

The Colts' flagship station from 1984 to 1998 and again starting in the 2007 season is WIBC 1070AM (renamed WFNI as of December 26, 2007); under the new contract, games are simulcast on WLHK 97.1 FM. From 1998 through 2006, the Colts' flagship station was WFBQ 94.7FM (with additional programming on WNDE 1260AM). Matt Taylor is the team's play-by-play announcer, holding that title since 2018 following Bob Lamey's retirement. Former Colts defensive coordinator and interim coach Rick Venturi is the color commentator, and Larra Overton joined as sideline reporter in 2019.

JJ Stankevitz became the team's public address announcer in 2022, replacing Mike Jansen, who had held the job since 1998.

== Indianapolis Colts radio announcers ==
Years	Flagship station	Play-by-play	Color commentator
1984	WIBC	Bob Lamey	Don Hein
1985	WIBC	Bob Lamey	Matt Bouzer
1986–1987	WIBC	Bob Lamey	Ed Harding
1988–1989	WIBC	Bob Lamey	Jerry Baker
1990–1991	WIBC	Bob Lamey	Mike Inglis
1992–1994	WFBQ/WNDE	Joe McConnell	Barry Krauss
1995–1997	WIBC	Bob Lamey	Mark Herrmann
1998	WFBQ	Bob Lamey	Mark Herrmann and Dave Calabro
1999–2004	WFBQ/WNDE	Bob Lamey	Mark Herrmann and Ted Marchibroda
2005–2006	WFBQ/WNDE	Bob Lamey	Ted Marchibroda
2007–2012	WFNI/WLHK	Bob Lamey	Will Wolford
2013–2017	WFNI/WLHK	Bob Lamey	Jim Sorgi
2018–2019	WFNI/WLHK	Matt Taylor	Jim Sorgi
2020–present	WFNI*/WLHK	Matt Taylor	Rick Venturi

- Prior to the 2021 season, the AM frequency of WFNI went dark; however, its simulcast on WFNI's repeater stations at 93.5 FM and 107.5 FM continued, alongside WLHK's broadcasts.

== Baltimore Colts radio announcers ==
Year	Station	Play-by-play	Color commentator
1983	WCBM	Chuck Thompson	Vince Bagli
1982	WCBM	Chuck Thompson	Vince Bagli
1981	WCBM	Chuck Thompson	Vince Bagli
1980	WCBM	Chuck Thompson	Vince Bagli
1979	WCBM	Chuck Thompson	Vince Bagli
1978	WCBM	Chuck Thompson	Vince Bagli
1977	WCBM	Chuck Thompson	Vince Bagli
1976	WCBM	Chuck Thompson	Vince Bagli
1975	WCBM	Chuck Thompson	Vince Bagli
1974	WCBM	Chuck Thompson	Ordell Braase
1973	WCBM	Chuck Thompson	Ordell Braase
1972	WCBM	Ted Moore	Ordell Braase
1971	WCBM	Ted Moore	Ordell Braase
1970	WCBM	Ted Moore	Neal Eskridge, Ordell Braase (sideline reporter)
1969	WCBM	Joe Croghan	Charley Eckman
1968	WCBM	Chuck Thompson	Bill O'Donnell, Jim Karvellas
1967	WCBM	Chuck Thompson	Frank Messer, Bill O'Donnell
1966	WCBM	Chuck Thompson	Frank Messer, Bill O'Donnell
1965	WCBM	Chuck Thompson, Joe Croghan	Frank Messer, Bill O'Donnell
1964	WBAL	Chuck Thompson	Frank Messer, Joe Croghan
1963	WBAL	Chuck Thompson	Joe Croghan
1962	WBAL	Chuck Thompson	John MacLean
1961	WBAL	Chuck Thompson	Bailey Goss, Vince Bagli
1960	WBAL	Chuck Thompson	Bailey Goss, Vince Bagli
1959	WBAL	Chuck Thompson	Bailey Goss, Vince Bagli
1958	WBAL	Chuck Thompson, Bob Wolff	Bailey Goss, Joe Croghan
1957	WBAL	Bob Wolff	Joe Croghan
1956		Chuck Thompson, Ernie Harwell	Bailey Goss
1955		Chuck Thompson, Ernie Harwell	Bailey Goss
1954	WCAO		
1953	WCBM		
