= List of Baltimore Orioles broadcasters =

== Television ==
Year	Channel	Play-by-play #1	Play-by-play #2	Play-by-play #3	Color commentators	Studio hosts	Telecasts
1954	WMAR-TV/WAAM	Ernie Harwell	Bailey Goss	Howie Williams			29 Home, 30 Away
1955	WMAR-TV/WAAM	Ernie Harwell	Bailey Goss	Chuck Thompson			26 Home, 31 Away
1956	WMAR-TV/WAAM	Ernie Harwell	Bailey Goss	Chuck Thompson			26 Home, 33 Away
1957	WMAR-TV/WAAM/WBAL-TV	Ernie Harwell	Herb Carneal	Larry Ray			21 Home, 37 Away
1958	WJZ-TV	Ernie Harwell	Herb Carneal				21 Home, 32 Away
1959	WJZ-TV	Ernie Harwell	Herb Carneal				21 Home, 33 Away
1960	WJZ-TV	Herb Carneal	Bob Murphy	Joe Croghan			11 Home, 35 Away
1961	WJZ-TV	Herb Carneal	Bob Murphy	Joe Croghan			11 Home, 39 Away
1962	WBAL-TV	Chuck Thompson	Jack Dunn III		Bailey Goss	Vince Bagli	4 Home, 46 Away
1963	WBAL-TV	Chuck Thompson	Joe Croghan			Vince Bagli	6 Home, 44 Away
1964	WJZ-TV	Chuck Thompson	Frank Messer				5 Home, 45 Away
1965	WJZ-TV	Chuck Thompson	Frank Messer				5 Home, 45 Away
1966	WJZ-TV	Chuck Thompson	Frank Messer	Bill O'Donnell			8 Home, 43 Away
1967	WJZ-TV	Chuck Thompson	Frank Messer	Bill O'Donnell			6 Home, 46 Away
1968	WJZ-TV	Chuck Thompson	Bill O'Donnell	Jim Karvellas			6 Home, 44 Away
1969	WJZ-TV	Chuck Thompson	Bill O'Donnell	Jim Karvellas			7 Home, 45 Away
1970	WJZ-TV	Chuck Thompson	Bill O'Donnell	John Gordon		John Kennelly & Charley Eckman	5 Home, 46 Away
1971	WJZ-TV	Chuck Thompson	Bill O'Donnell	John Gordon		John Kennelly	6 Home, 45 Away
1972	WJZ-TV	Chuck Thompson	Bill O'Donnell	John Gordon		John Kennelly	8 Home, 44 Away
1973	WJZ-TV	Chuck Thompson	Bill O'Donnell				8 Home, 44 Away
1974	WJZ-TV	Chuck Thompson	Bill O'Donnell				9 Home, 43 Away
1975	WJZ-TV	Chuck Thompson	Bill O'Donnell				9 Home, 43 Away
1976	WJZ-TV	Chuck Thompson	Bill O'Donnell				9 Home, 43 Away
1977	WJZ-TV	Chuck Thompson	Bill O'Donnell				8 Home, 44 Away
1978	WJZ-TV	Chuck Thompson	Bill O'Donnell		Brooks Robinson		8 Home, 42 Away
1979	WMAR-TV	Chuck Thompson	Bill O'Donnell		Brooks Robinson		6 Home, 45 Away
1980	WMAR-TV	Chuck Thompson	Bill O'Donnell		Brooks Robinson		5 Home, 49 Away
1981	WMAR-TV	Chuck Thompson	Bill O'Donnell		Brooks Robinson		5 Home, 48 Away
1982	WMAR-TV; SuperTV	Chuck Thompson; Ted Patterson	Bill O'Donnell		Brooks Robinson; Rex Barney		5 Home, 50 Away; 16 Home
1983	WMAR-TV; SuperTV	Chuck Thompson; Ted Patterson			Brooks Robinson; Rex Barney		50 Away; 16 Home

Year	Channel	Play-by-play announcers	Color commentators	Sideline reporters	Studio hosts	Studio analysts
1984	Home Team Sports	Mel Proctor	Jim Palmer or Rex Barney	Tom Davis	Tom Davis	
1984	WMAR-TV	Chuck Thompson	Brooks Robinson			
1985	Home Team Sports	Mel Proctor	Jim Palmer, John Lowenstein, or Rex Barney	Tom Davis	Tom Davis	
1985	WMAR-TV	Chuck Thompson	Brooks Robinson			
1986	Home Team Sports	Mel Proctor	Jim Palmer, John Lowenstein, or Rex Barney	Tom Davis	Tom Davis	
1986	WMAR-TV	Chuck Thompson	Brooks Robinson			
1987	Home Team Sports	Mel Proctor	Jim Palmer, John Lowenstein, or Rex Barney	Tom Davis	Tom Davis	
1987	WMAR-TV	Jim Simpson	Brooks Robinson			
1988	Home Team Sports	Mel Proctor	Jim Palmer, John Lowenstein, or Rex Barney	Tom Davis	Tom Davis	
1988	WMAR-TV	Jim Palmer	Brooks Robinson			
1989	Home Team Sports	Mel Proctor	Jim Palmer, John Lowenstein, or Rex Barney	Tom Davis	Tom Davis	
1989	WMAR-TV	Jim Palmer	Brooks Robinson			
1990	Home Team Sports	Mel Proctor	Jim Palmer, John Lowenstein, or Rex Barney	Tom Davis	Tom Davis	
1990	WMAR-TV	Jon Miller	Brooks Robinson, Scott Garceau, & Jim Palmer			
1991	Home Team Sports	Mel Proctor	Jim Palmer or John Lowenstein	Tom Davis	Tom Davis	
1991	WMAR-TV	Jon Miller	Brooks Robinson & Scott Garceau			
1992	Home Team Sports	Mel Proctor	Jim Palmer or John Lowenstein	Tom Davis	Tom Davis	
1992	WMAR-TV	Jon Miller	Brooks Robinson & Scott Garceau			
1993	Home Team Sports	Mel Proctor	Jim Palmer or John Lowenstein	Tom Davis	Tom Davis	
1994	Home Team Sports	Mel Proctor	Jim Palmer or John Lowenstein	Tom Davis	Tom Davis	
1995	Home Team Sports	Mel Proctor	Jim Palmer or John Lowenstein	Tom Davis	Tom Davis	
1996	Home Team Sports	Mel Proctor	Jim Palmer or Mike Flanagan	Tom Davis	Tom Davis	
1997	Home Team Sports	Michael Reghi	Jim Palmer or Mike Flanagan	Tom Davis	Tom Davis	
1998	Home Team Sports	Michael Reghi	Jim Palmer or Rick Cerone	Tom Davis	Tom Davis	
1999	Home Team Sports	Michael Reghi	Jim Palmer or Mike Flanagan	Tom Davis	Tom Davis	
2000	Home Team Sports	Michael Reghi	Jim Palmer or Mike Flanagan	Tom Davis	Tom Davis	
2001	Comcast SportsNet Mid-Atlantic	Michael Reghi	Jim Palmer or Mike Flanagan	Tom Davis	Tom Davis	
2002	Comcast SportsNet Mid-Atlantic	Michael Reghi	Jim Palmer or Mike Flanagan	Tom Davis	Tom Davis	
2003	Comcast SportsNet Mid-Atlantic	Michael Reghi	Jim Palmer or Buck Martinez	Tom Davis	Tom Davis	
2004	Comcast SportsNet Mid-Atlantic	Jim Hunter or Fred Manfra	Jim Palmer or Buck Martinez	Brent Harris	Brent Harris	Dave Johnson
2005	Comcast SportsNet Mid-Atlantic	Jim Hunter or Fred Manfra	Jim Palmer or Buck Martinez	Brent Harris	Brent Harris	Dave Johnson
2006	Comcast SportsNet Mid-Atlantic	Jim Hunter or Fred Manfra	Jim Palmer or Buck Martinez	Brent Harris	Brent Harris	Dave Johnson
2007	MASN	Gary Thorne	Jim Palmer or Buck Martinez	Amber Theoharis	Jim Hunter or Tom Davis	Rick Dempsey
2008	MASN	Gary Thorne	Jim Palmer or Buck Martinez	Amber Theoharis	Jim Hunter or Tom Davis	Rick Dempsey
2009	MASN	Gary Thorne	Jim Palmer or Buck Martinez	Amber Theoharis or Mark Viviano	Jim Hunter or Tom Davis	Rick Dempsey
2010	MASN	Gary Thorne	Jim Palmer or Mike Flanagan	Amber Theoharis	Jim Hunter or Tom Davis or Amber Theoharis	Rick Dempsey
2011	MASN	Gary Thorne	Jim Palmer or Mike Flanagan		Jim Hunter or Tom Davis or Amber Theoharis	Rick Dempsey
2012	MASN	Gary Thorne or Jim Hunter	Jim Palmer or Mike Bordick		Jim Hunter	Rick Dempsey or Tom Davis or Amber Theoharis
2013	MASN	Gary Thorne or Jim Hunter	Jim Palmer or Mike Bordick		Jim Hunter or Tom Davis	Rick Dempsey
2014	MASN	Gary Thorne or Jim Hunter	Jim Palmer or Mike Bordick		Jim Hunter or Tom Davis	Rick Dempsey
2015	MASN	Gary Thorne or Jim Hunter	Jim Palmer or Mike Bordick		Jim Hunter or Tom Davis	Rick Dempsey
2016	MASN	Gary Thorne or Jim Hunter	Jim Palmer or Mike Bordick or Brian Roberts (select games)		Tom Davis	Rick Dempsey
2017	MASN	Gary Thorne or Jim Hunter	Jim Palmer or Mike Bordick		Tom Davis	Rick Dempsey
2018	MASN	Gary Thorne or Jim Hunter	Jim Palmer or Mike Bordick or Ben McDonald (fill-in)		Tom Davis	Rick Dempsey
2019	MASN	Gary Thorne or Jim Hunter	Jim Palmer or Ben McDonald or Mike Bordick or Brian Roberts (fill-in)	Sara Perlman (Until July 21); None (July 22 onwards)	Tom Davis or Rob Long (weekends)	Rick Dempsey
2020	MASN	Scott Garceau, Kevin Brown or Geoff Arnold	Ben McDonald or Mike Bordick	Melanie Newman or Brett Hollander	Brett Hollander, Melanie Newman, Rob Long or Scott Garceau	Mike Bordick or Dave Johnson
2021	MASN	Scott Garceau or Kevin Brown	Ben McDonald or Jim Palmer	Melanie Newman or Brett Hollander	Brett Hollander, Melanie Newman, Rob Long or Scott Garceau	Ben McDonald or Jim Palmer
2022	MASN	Kevin Brown (130 games), Scott Garceau (fill-in), Geoff Arnold (fill-in) or Melanie Newman (fill-in)	Ben McDonald or Jim Palmer or Dave Johnson (fill-in) or Roch Kubatko (fill-in)	Melanie Newman or Brett Hollander	Brett Hollander, Melanie Newman, Rob Long or Scott Garceau	Ben McDonald or Jim Palmer
2023	MASN	Kevin Brown (130 games), Scott Garceau (fill-in), Geoff Arnold (fill-in) or Melanie Newman (fill-in)	Ben McDonald or Jim Palmer or Dave Johnson (fill-in) or Brian Roberts (fill-in) or Brad Brach (fill-in) or Mike Devereaux (fill-in)	Melanie Newman or Brett Hollander	Brett Hollander, Melanie Newman, Rob Long or Scott Garceau	Ben McDonald or Jim Palmer or Jason La Canfora
2024	MASN	Kevin Brown (130 games), Ben Wagner (fill-in), Geoff Arnold (fill-in) or Melanie Newman (fill-in)	Ben McDonald or Jim Palmer or Dave Johnson (fill-in) or Brian Roberts (fill-in) or Brad Brach (fill-in) or Mike Devereaux (fill-in)	Melanie Newman or Brett Hollander or Rob Long	Brett Hollander, Melanie Newman, Rob Long or Scott Garceau	Ben McDonald or Jim Palmer
2025	MASN	Kevin Brown, Ben Wagner, Brett Hollander (fill-in), or Geoff Arnold (fill-in)	Ben McDonald or Jim Palmer or Brian Roberts or Dave Johnson (fill-in)	Melanie Newman or Brett Hollander or Rob Long	Melanie Newman or Rob Long	Ben McDonald or Jim Palmer
2026	MASN	Kevin Brown or Ben Wagner	Ben McDonald or Jim Palmer or Brian Roberts (fill-in) or Ryan Ripken (fill-in)	Melanie Newman or Rob Long	Melanie Newman or Rob Long	Ben McDonald or Jim Palmer

== Radio ==
Year	Flagship station	Play-by-play #1	Play-by-play #2	Play-by-play #3	Color commentators	Studio hosts
1954	WCBM	Ernie Harwell	Bailey Goss			
1955	WCBM	Ernie Harwell	Bailey Goss	Chuck Thompson		
1956	WCBM	Ernie Harwell	Bailey Goss	Chuck Thompson		
1957	WBAL	Ernie Harwell	Herb Carneal	Larry Ray		
1958	WBAL	Ernie Harwell	Herb Carneal			
1959	WBAL	Ernie Harwell	Herb Carneal			
1960	WBAL	Herb Carneal	Bob Murphy	Joe Croghan		
1961	WBAL	Herb Carneal	Bob Murphy	Joe Croghan		
1962	WBAL	Chuck Thompson	Jack Dunn		Bailey Goss	
1963	WBAL	Chuck Thompson	Joe Croghan			
1964	WBAL	Chuck Thompson	Frank Messer			
1965	WBAL	Chuck Thompson	Frank Messer			
1966	WBAL	Chuck Thompson	Frank Messer	Bill O'Donnell		
1967	WBAL	Chuck Thompson	Frank Messer	Bill O'Donnell		
1968	WBAL	Chuck Thompson	Bill O'Donnell	Jim Karvellas		
1969	WBAL	Chuck Thompson	Bill O'Donnell	Jim Karvellas		
1970	WBAL	Chuck Thompson	Bill O'Donnell	John Gordon		Jim West
1971	WBAL	Chuck Thompson	Bill O'Donnell	John Gordon		Jim West
1972	WBAL	Chuck Thompson	Bill O'Donnell	John Gordon		
1973	WBAL	Chuck Thompson	Bill O'Donnell			Ted Patterson
1974	WBAL	Chuck Thompson	Bill O'Donnell			Ted Patterson
1975	WBAL	Chuck Thompson	Bill O'Donnell			Ted Patterson
1976	WBAL	Chuck Thompson	Bill O'Donnell			Ted Patterson
1977	WBAL	Chuck Thompson	Bill O'Donnell			Ted Patterson
1978	WBAL	Chuck Thompson	Bill O'Donnell			Ted Patterson
1979	WFBR	Chuck Thompson	Bill O'Donnell	Tom Marr		
1980	WFBR	Chuck Thompson	Bill O'Donnell	Tom Marr		
1981	WFBR	Chuck Thompson	Bill O'Donnell	Tom Marr		
1982	WFBR	Chuck Thompson		Tom Marr		
1983	WFBR	Jon Miller		Tom Marr		
1984	WFBR	Jon Miller		Tom Marr		
1985	WFBR	Jon Miller		Tom Marr		
1986	WFBR	Jon Miller		Tom Marr		
1987	WCBM	Jon Miller	Jack Wiers			
1988	WBAL	Jon Miller	Joe Angel			
1989	WBAL	Jon Miller	Joe Angel			
1990	WBAL	Jon Miller	Joe Angel			
1991	WBAL	Jon Miller or Chuck Thompson	Ken Levine			
1992	WBAL	Jon Miller or Chuck Thompson	Joe Angel			
1993	WBAL	Jon Miller or Chuck Thompson	Fred Manfra			
1994	WBAL	Jon Miller or Chuck Thompson	Fred Manfra			
1995	WBAL	Jon Miller or Chuck Thompson	Fred Manfra			
1996	WBAL	Jon Miller or Chuck Thompson	Fred Manfra			
1997	WBAL	Jim Hunter or Chuck Thompson	Fred Manfra			
1998	WBAL	Jim Hunter or Chuck Thompson	Fred Manfra			
1999	WBAL	Jim Hunter or Chuck Thompson	Fred Manfra			
2000	WBAL	Jim Hunter or Chuck Thompson	Fred Manfra			
2001	WBAL	Jim Hunter or Chuck Thompson	Fred Manfra			
2002	WBAL	Jim Hunter	Fred Manfra			
2003	WBAL	Jim Hunter	Fred Manfra			
2004	WBAL	Joe Angel	Fred Manfra			
2005	WBAL	Joe Angel	Jim Hunter or Fred Manfra			
2006	WBAL	Joe Angel	Jim Hunter or Fred Manfra			
2007	WHFS-FM	Joe Angel	Fred Manfra			
2008	WHFS-FM	Joe Angel	Fred Manfra			
2009	WJZ-FM	Joe Angel	Fred Manfra			
2010	WJZ-FM	Joe Angel	Fred Manfra			
2011	WBAL	Joe Angel	Fred Manfra			
2012	WBAL	Joe Angel	Fred Manfra			
2013	WBAL	Joe Angel	Fred Manfra			
2014	WBAL	Joe Angel	Fred Manfra or Jim Hunter		Dave Johnson	
2015	WJZ-FM	Joe Angel	Fred Manfra or Jim Hunter		Dave Johnson	
2016	WJZ-FM	Joe Angel	Jim Hunter or Fred Manfra		Mike Bordick	
2017	WJZ-FM	Joe Angel	Jim Hunter		Mike Bordick, Ben McDonald, Brian Roberts, Mike Boddicker, Dave Johnson, or Gregg Olsen	
2018	WJZ-FM	Joe Angel	Jim Hunter		Mike Bordick, Ben McDonald, Brian Roberts, Dave Johnson, or Gregg Olsen	
2019	WJZ-FM	Jim Hunter	Kevin Brown		Mike Bordick, Ben McDonald, Brian Roberts, Dave Johnson, or Gregg Olsen	
2020	WJZ-FM	Geoff Arnold	Kevin Brown, Melanie Newman or Brett Hollander		Mike Bordick, Ben McDonald, Brian Roberts, Dave Johnson, or Gregg Olsen	
2021	WJZ-FM	Geoff Arnold	Kevin Brown, Melanie Newman or Brett Hollander			
2022	WBAL	Geoff Arnold	Brett Hollander, Melanie Newman or Scott Garceau			
2023	WBAL	Geoff Arnold	Brett Hollander, Melanie Newman or Scott Garceau			
2024	WBAL	Geoff Arnold	Brett Hollander, Melanie Newman, Scott Garceau or Ben Wagner			
2025	WBAL	Geoff Arnold	Brett Hollander, Ben Wagner or Fred Manfra (fill-in)			
2026	WBAL	Brett Hollander	Ben Wagner or Josh Lewin			
