= Jim Bartlett =

Canadian ice hockey player (1932–2021)

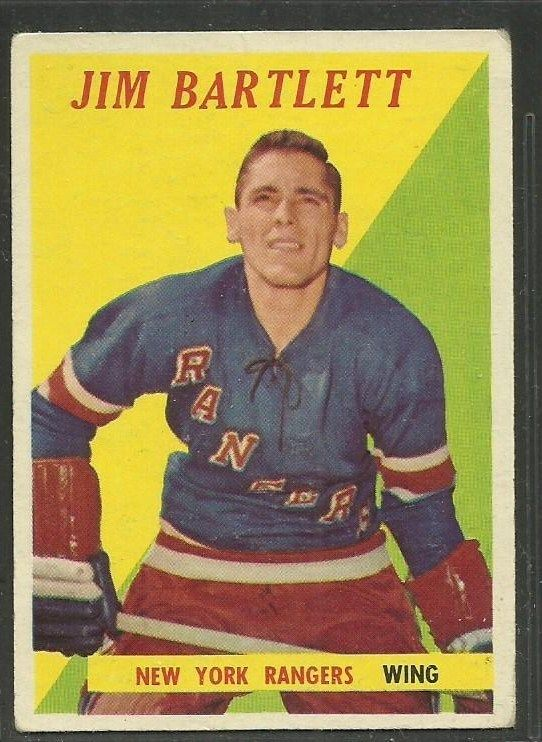
- Born: May 27, 1932; Verdun, Quebec, Canada
- Died: August 27, 2021 (aged 89)
- Height: 5 ft 9 in (175 cm)
- Weight: 165 lb (75 kg; 11 st 11 lb)
- Position: Left wing
- Shot: Left
- Played for: New York Rangers; Boston Bruins; Montreal Canadiens
- Playing career: 1951–1973

James Baker Bartlett (May 27, 1932 – August 27, 2021) was a Canadian ice hockey left winger. He played in the National Hockey League with the Montreal Canadiens, Boston Bruins, and New York Rangers between 1954 and 1961. The rest of his career, which lasted from 1951 to 1973, was mainly spent in the minor American Hockey League.

== Professional career ==
Bartlett's career was mainly played in the American Hockey League for the Baltimore Clippers and Providence Reds, over twenty years. He spent three years with the New York Rangers and one with the Boston Bruins, as well as having played four games with the Montreal Canadiens early in his career, playing a total of 191 games in the NHL. He set an AHL record in 1958 when he scored two goals five seconds apart. He almost had his career end in 1963 when he was hit in his eye with a stick; however, he was back playing within months.

== Post-pro career ==
Close to the end of his professional hockey career, Bartlett kept his skills sharp by playing with the National Brewers, a Baltimore area amateur team that was sponsored by the National Brewing Company and National Bohemian. He returned to the pro level to score 8 goals in 11 games for the Baltimore Clippers at the end of the 1971-72 season, and then played another full 72-game season with the Clippers in 1972-73.

In 1974, Bartlett brought his professional hockey career to a close and then enjoyed four more seasons of amateur hockey in the Baltimore-Washington area with the Brewers. During the five seasons that Bartlett played with the Brewers, he worked as a driver for the National Brewing Company in Baltimore.

Bartlett moved from Baltimore to Tampa, Florida, in 1987. Making use of his experience as a driver, he became a full-time assistant as an advisor and driver for George Steinbrenner. In 2018, he was inducted into the American Hockey League Hall of Fame.

== Records ==
- American Hockey League record for fastest two goals scored (1958)

== Career statistics ==
=== Regular season and playoffs ===
			Regular season					Playoffs
Season	Team	League	GP	G	A	Pts	PIM	GP	G	A	Pts	PIM
1949–50	Verdun Jr. Maple Leafs	QJHL	6	0	0	0	4	1	0	0	0	0
1950–51	Verdun LaSalle	QJHL	38	8	8	16	67	3	1	0	1	7
1951–52	St. Jerome Eagles	QPJHL	44	25	31	56	167	—	—	—	—	—
1951–52	Boston Olympics	EAHL	14	2	6	8	39	2	1	0	1	4
1952–53	Cincinnati Mohawks	IHL	49	32	30	62	122	9	4	5	9	22
1953–54	Matane Red Rockets	LSLHL	61	43	29	72	139	16	11	14	25	46
1954–55	Montreal Canadiens	NHL	2	0	0	0	4	2	0	0	0	0
1954–55	Chicoutimi Sagueneens	QHL	58	28	28	56	150	7	1	4	5	20
1955–56	New York Rangers	NHL	12	0	1	1	8	—	—	—	—	—
1955–56	Providence Reds	AHL	50	28	19	47	110	9	3	5	8	27
1956–57	Providence Reds	AHL	63	21	22	43	105	4	1	0	1	27
1957–58	Providence Reds	AHL	59	25	21	46	86	5	2	1	3	11
1958–59	New York Rangers	NHL	70	11	9	20	118	—	—	—	—	—
1959–60	New York Rangers	NHL	44	8	4	12	48	—	—	—	—	—
1959–60	Springfield Indians	AHL	21	7	3	10	12	8	5	3	8	15
1960–61	Boston Bruins	NHL	63	15	9	24	95	—	—	—	—	—
1961–62	Providence Reds	AHL	62	31	34	65	80	3	0	1	1	8
1962–63	Providence Reds	AHL	67	28	38	66	87	6	1	2	3	10
1963–64	Providence Reds	AHL	72	26	39	65	75	3	2	1	3	4
1964–65	Providence Reds	AHL	71	22	36	58	92	—	—	—	—	—
1965–66	Providence Reds	AHL	68	19	26	45	70	—	—	—	—	—
1966–67	Baltimore Clippers	AHL	67	30	21	51	24	13	3	3	6	10
1967–68	Baltimore Clippers	AHL	71	22	29	51	71	—	—	—	—	—
1968–69	Baltimore Clippers	AHL	73	25	23	48	40	4	1	0	1	10
1969–70	Baltimore Clippers	AHL	65	30	28	58	34	5	2	1	3	2
1970–71	Baltimore Clippers	AHL	63	14	25	39	51	6	0	1	1	4
1971–72	Baltimore Clippers	AHL	11	8	2	10	23	—	—	—	—	—
1971–72	Columbus Seals	IHL	14	4	6	10	23	—	—	—	—	—
1972–73	Baltimore Clippers	AHL	72	24	16	40	31	—	—	—	—	—
AHL totals			955	360	382	742	991	66	20	18	38	128
NHL totals			191	34	23	57	273	2	0	0	0	0
