= Bailey Goss =

American sportscaster (1912–1962)

- Born: George Bailey Goss; June 5, 1912; Sunbury, Pennsylvania, U.S.
- Died: May 1, 1962 (aged 49); Baltimore, Maryland, U.S.
- Sports commentary career
- Teams: Baltimore Colts (1947–1961); Washington Senators (1953, 1958); Baltimore Orioles (1954–1956, 1962)
- Sports: National Football League; Major League Baseball; Professional wrestling

George Bailey Goss (June 5, 1912 – May 1, 1962) was an American sportscaster who was a play-by-play announcer for the Washington Senators, Baltimore Orioles, Baltimore Bullets, and Baltimore Colts.

== Early life ==
Goss was a standout athlete at Sunbury High School in Sunbury, Pennsylvania and was captain of the football and track teams at Albright College.

== Career ==
Goss began his broadcasting career in 1935 at WEEU in Reading, Pennsylvania. In 1936, he intervened in a knife attack on WEEU/WRAW program director Paul J. Breedy, knocking down the assailant, a band leader named James White, and holding him down until police arrived. In 1940, Goss moved to WBAL in Baltimore, where he replaced Garry Moore. He hosted National Sports Parade, sponsored by National Brewing Company. In 1942, he began working directly for National Brewing Company.

In 1947, Goss became the television play-by-play announcer for the Baltimore Colts of the National Football League. He also called home games for the National Basketball Association's Baltimore Bullets. In 1948, he began hosting National Amateur Time, a weekly children's talent show, on WMAR-TV. The following year he brought a television version of the Sports Parade to the station. National Brewing had three hours of airtime to fill, but the sports bulletins took at most thirty minutes, so the remaining portion of the program became a variety show hosted by Goss and Joanie Coale known as the National Revue. He was also the play-by-play announcer for WMAR's weekly wrestling program.

In 1953, Goss joined Arch McDonald and Bob Wolff on the Washington Senators' broadcast team. When the St. Louis Browns relocated to Baltimore and became the Orioles in 1954, Goss and Ernie Harwell called the team's games on WMAR-TV and WCBM. In 1955, they were joined by Chuck Thompson. In 1957, Gunther Brewing Company replaced National as the sponsor of the Orioles' broadcasts and Goss and Thompson were replaced by Herb Carneal and Larry Ray. National resumed sponsoring the Orioles' broadcasts in 1962 and Thompson and Goss rejoined the broadcast team, with Thompson calling the play-by-plan and Goss serving as the color commenator.

== Death ==
Shortly after midnight on May 1, 1962, Goss, who was driving home from a Colts press dinner, rear-ended a tractor-trailer stopped at a traffic light. He was taken to Union Memorial Hospital, where he underwent emergency surgery. He died around 9 am. He was buried in Druid Ridge Cemetery in Pikesville, Maryland.

In 1971, Goss' widow filed a medical malpractice suit against the two surgeons who operated on her husband, alleging that they had failed to identify a ruptured spleen before operating on Goss' facial injuries. The surgeons contended that Goss' internal injuries would have been fatal regardless of what treatment he was given and that his drinking on the night of the crash had made efforts to diagnose and treat his injuries difficult. On May 6, 1971, a jury ruled in favor of the surgeons.
