= List of Miami Dolphins broadcasters =

The Miami Dolphins' flagship radio station is AM 560 WQAM. WQAM has previously carried Dolphins broadcasts during the 1997-04, and 2007-09 NFL Seasons. The radio broadcast team features Jimmy Cefalo providing play-by-play commentary and Joe Rose and Jason Taylor providing color commentary during regular season games. The Miami Dolphins Radio Network is a statewide network of radio stations in Florida.

Most preseason games are seen on WFOR (CBS) in Miami/Fort Lauderdale, WTVX (CW) in West Palm Beach/Fort Pierce, and WBBH (NBC) in Fort Myers with announcers Dick Stockton, Bob Griese, and Nat Moore.

ESPN reporter Hank Goldberg was a longtime color analyst on the Miami Dolphins Radio Network and hosted the Orange Bowl Express/Dolphin Express pre-game show on 610 WIOD.

== Radio announcers ==
Years	Flagship station	Play-by-play	Color commentator	Sideline reporter
1966	AM 610 WIOD	Mel Allen	Don Bosseler	
1967–69	AM 610 WIOD	Bob Gallagher	Henry Barrow	
1970	AM 610 WIOD	Joe Croghan	Larry King	Henry Barrow
1971	AM 610 WIOD	Rick Weaver	Larry King	Henry Barrow
1972	AM 610 WIOD	Rick Weaver	Lou Creekmur	Henry Barrow
1973	AM 610 WIOD	Rick Weaver	Fred Woodson	Henry Barrow
1974–76	AM 610 WIOD	Rick Weaver	Allan Minter	
1977–91	AM 610 WIOD	Rick Weaver	Hank Goldberg	Henry Barrow
1992–93	AM 610 WIOD	Rick Weaver	Jim Mandich	
1994–01	AM 610 WIOD	Bill Zimpfer	Jim Mandich	
2002–04	AM 560 WQAM	Howard David	Jim Mandich	
2005–06	AM 790 WAXY	Jimmy Cefalo	Joe Rose	Nat Moore
2007–2009	AM 560 WQAM	Jimmy Cefalo	Jim Mandich and Joe Rose	
2010	AM 940 WINZ / FM 105.9 WBGG	Jimmy Cefalo or Dick Stockton (week 4)	Jim Mandich and Joe Rose	
2011–2015	AM 940 WINZ / FM 105.9 WBGG	Jimmy Cefalo	Bob Griese and Joe Rose	Kim Bokamper and Keith Sims
2016–2019	AM 560 WQAM / FM KISS 99.9 WKIS	Jimmy Cefalo	Jason Taylor (Preseason) Bob Griese (Regular season) and Joe Rose	Kim Bokamper and Keith Sims
2020–2021	AM 560 WQAM / FM KISS 99.9 WKIS	Jimmy Cefalo	Joe Rose and Jason Taylor	Kim Bokamper
2022–present	AM 560 WQAM / FM KISS 99.9 WKIS	Jimmy Cefalo	Joe Rose	Kim Bokamper

== Preseason television announcers ==
Year	Play-by-play	Analyst(s)	Field reporter(s)
1971	Joe Croghan	Dave Kocourek	
1972	Bob Gallagher	Dave Kocourek	Bob Halloran
1973	Jim Thacker		
1974	Jim Thacker		
1975	Bob Halloran	Hank Stram	Jane Chastain and Tony Segreto
1976	Roger Twibell	Tony Segreto and Nick Buoniconti	
1977	Roger Twibell	Tony Segreto	
1978	Paul Hornung (2 games) or Frank Buetel (1 game)	Tony Segreto	
1979	Paul Hornung	Tony Segreto	
1980	Chuck Dowdle	Tim Foley	
1981	Curt Gowdy	Tim Foley	
1982	Chuck Dowdle	Tim Foley	
1983	Roger Twibell	Bob Griese	Jim Gallagher & John Loesing
1984	Roger Twibell	Bob Griese	
1985	Jay Randolph	Bob Griese	Andy Leopold
1986	Jay Randolph	Bob Griese	Walt Gray
1987	Jay Randolph	Bob Griese	Walt Gray
1988	Jay Randolph	Bob Griese	
1989	Jay Randolph	Bob Griese	
1990	Jay Randolph	Bob Griese	
1991	Jay Randolph	Bob Griese	
1992	Jay Randolph	Bob Griese	
1993	Brad Nessler	Bob Griese	
1994	Brad Nessler	Bob Griese	
1995	Brad Nessler	Bob Griese	
1996	Brad Nessler	Bob Griese	
1997	Brad Nessler	Bob Griese	
1998	Brad Nessler	Bob Griese and Nat Moore	
1999	Brad Nessler	Bob Griese and Nat Moore	
2000	Bob Neal	Bob Griese	
2001	Craig Bolerjack	Bob Griese and Trevor Matich	
2002	Craig Bolerjack	Bob Griese and Nat Moore	Kim Bokamper
2003	Craig Bolerjack	Bob Griese and Nat Moore	Kim Bokamper
2004	Craig Bolerjack	Bob Griese and Nat Moore	Kim Bokamper
2005	Craig Bolerjack	Bob Griese and Nat Moore	Kim Bokamper
2006	Craig Bolerjack	Bob Griese and Nat Moore	Kim Bokamper
2007	Craig Bolerjack	Bob Griese and Nat Moore	Kim Bokamper
2008	Craig Bolerjack	Bob Griese and Nat Moore	Kim Bokamper
2009	Craig Bolerjack	Bob Griese and Nat Moore	Kim Bokamper
2010	Dick Stockton	Bob Griese and Nat Moore	Kim Bokamper
2011	Dick Stockton	Bob Griese and Nat Moore	Kim Bokamper
2012	Dick Stockton	Bob Griese and Nat Moore	Kim Bokamper
2013	Jesse Agler	Bob Griese and Nat Moore	Kim Bokamper
2014	Dick Stockton	Bob Griese and Nat Moore	Kim Bokamper
2015	Dick Stockton	Bob Griese and Nat Moore	Kim Bokamper

== Regular season television coverage ==
From their inaugural season in 1966 until the end of the 1988 season, the majority of the Dolphins' games were carried on WSVN, as it was the Miami area's NBC affiliate (NBC carried the AFL/AFC package from 1965–97). In 1989, after NBC purchased CBS affiliate WTVJ (then on channel 4), NBC programming, and thus the Dolphins games, moved there. Prior to that time, WTVJ starting in 1973 aired sold-out Dolphins home games in which they played an NFC opponent (CBS had the NFC package at that time). From 1989 through 1993, those games would air on WCIX (then on channel 6), which was bought by CBS.

In 1994, the NFC package moved to Fox, and WSVN (which became the Fox affiliate after the network purchases of WTVJ and WCIX) starting airing the Dolphins' interconference home games. In 1998, the AFC package moved to CBS and, locally, the former WCIX, now known as WFOR (as it had swapped dial positions with WTVJ three years earlier).

WPLG was the local carrier of Monday Night Football games through 2005. When the Dolphins play on Monday nights, they now air locally on WSFL-TV.

WFOR produces the local telecasts of the Dolphins' preseason games, pre-empting CBS programming which is shown on sister station WBFS-TV. The preseason games are simulcast in the adjacent West Palm Beach television market on area CW affiliate WTVX, which was a sister station of WFOR from 1997 until 2008; all regular-season games are currently telecast by that market's CBS affiliate WPEC.
