= Bankard-Gunther Mansion =

Historic house in Maryland

- U.S. National Register of Historic Places
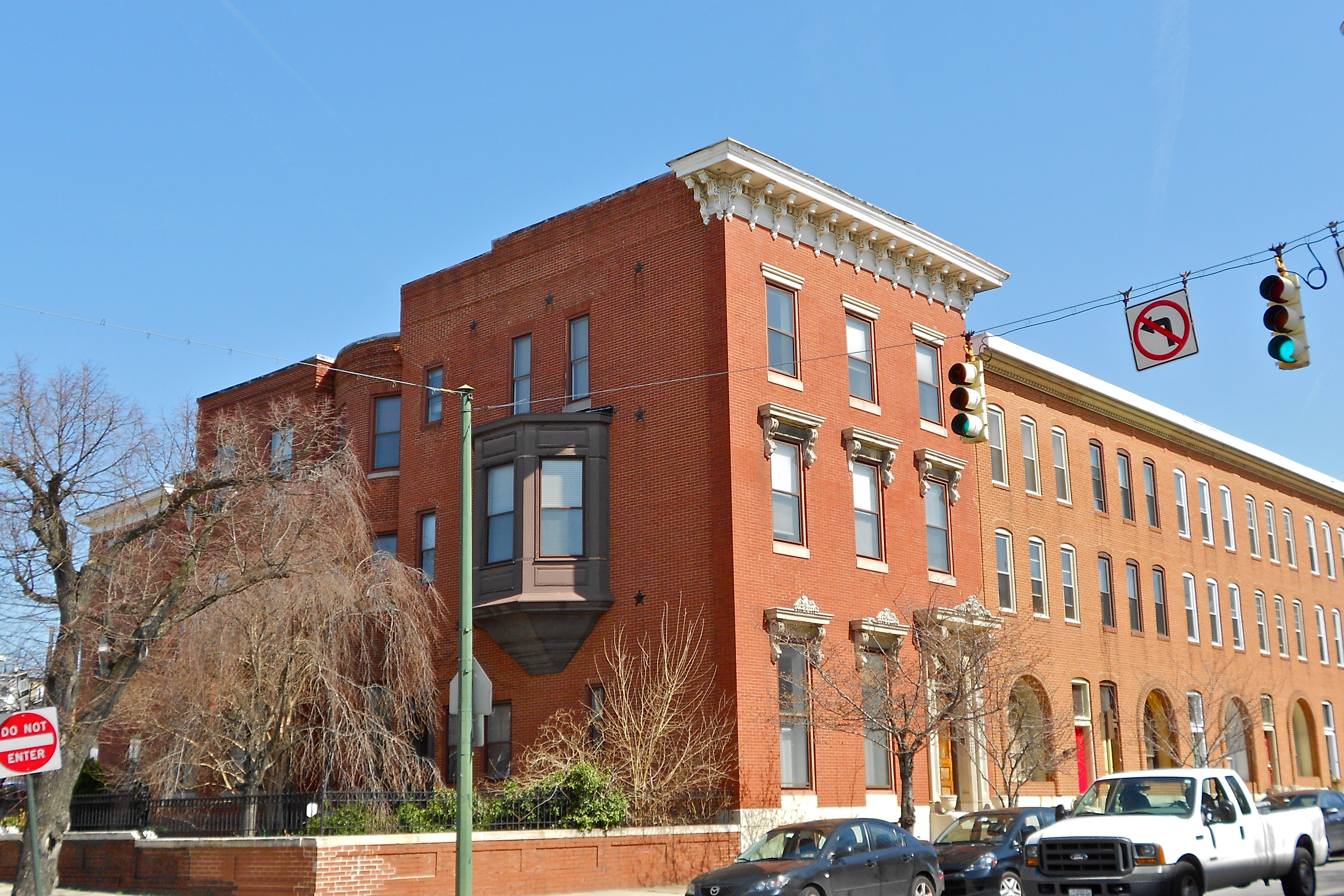
- Mansion in 2012

- Location within Baltimore Location within Maryland Location within the United States
- Location: 2102 E. Baltimore St., Baltimore, Maryland
- Coordinates: 39°17′31″N 76°35′14″W
- Area: 0.2 acres (0.081 ha)
- Built: 1866
- Architect: Sisson, Hugh
- Architectural style: Renaissance, Italianate
- NRHP reference No.: (%d+) (increase) (%d+) (decrease)
- Added to NRHP: August 6, 1980

Bankard-Gunther Mansion is a historic Baltimore, Maryland home built in 1866. It is a three-story, three bay wide, nine bay deep, flat-roofed brick building located on the corner of Baltimore and Chester Streets. It is a richly embellished Italianate-style building that was originally built for Jacob J. Bankard, one of the prominent Baltimore butchers who lived on the so-called "Butcher's Hill".

== History ==
Jacob J. Bankard was from a family of butchers who worked around Butcher Hill since the 1840s. He made a fortune during the Civil War by selling meat to the Union Army and commissioned the home one year after the war ended. The architect and builder of the home are unknown. It is probable that stone mason Hugh Sisson created the ornamentation found on the facade. Sisson ("Marble King of Baltimore") did the stone work for other notable buildings around the city. Originally a free-standing home, the attached row on the east side was added later, evident by the contrasting brick color. There is a large walled-in side garden on the west side, which today serves as an entrance to one of the units. In the back, an unattached carriage house has been preserved and converted into a separate home.

Jacob Bankard died in November 1885, but not before selling the mansion in 1882 to his nephew, Robert J. "Doc" Slater, a wealthy gambler and powerful political boss of East Baltimore. In 1891, Slater sold the home to George Gunther, founder of the Gunther Brewing Company, one of the best known breweries in the state.

The Gunther family continued to live in the mansion after George's death in 1912, eventually selling it in 1919 to the Hebrew Home for Incurables. This institution provided care for the elderly and disabled, particularly those with chronic conditions. In 1929, they moved to a new location, which still exists called the Levindale Hebrew Geriatric Center & Hospital. In 1929, the same year, the Presbyterian Church purchased the home and established the Emmanuel Neighborhood House, led by the Rev. Aaron Judah Kligerman. The institution served as a mission, providing humanitarian services and religious outreach to Jewish converts to Christianity.

After the Emmanuel Neighborhood House departed in 1948, the mansion entered a period of decline. Initially divided into apartments, the building was eventually abandoned and deteriorated significantly, mirroring the decline of the surrounding neighborhood. By the late 1970s, it was in a derelict condition, with photographs showing boarded windows, rotting woodwork, and a gutted interior. The path toward its preservation began in 1980 when the building was added to the National Register of Historic Places. This official recognition provided the impetus for a major renovation project. Following extensive restoration, the Bankard-Gunther Mansion was returned to its use as a multi-unit apartment building, while still preserving its historic character.

A photograph of the building featuring neighborhood boys and titled "Neighborhood boys by the Bankard-Gunther Mansion, Butchers Hill" by Linda Rich, taken sometime between 1977-1980, is part of the Smithsonian American Art Museum's collection.
