= WEFL =

Radio station in Florida, United States

- Tequesta, Florida; United States
- Broadcast area: West Palm Beach
- Frequency: 760 kHz
- Branding: Deportes 760

Programming
- Language: Spanish
- Format: Sports radio
- Affiliations: TUDN Radio; Miami Dolphins Spanish Radio Network

Ownership
- Owner: Good Karma Sports

History
- First air date: June 22, 1998
- Former call signs: WBDO (1998–2001)
- Call sign meaning: Eastern Florida or ESPN Florida

Technical information
- Licensing authority: FCC
- Facility ID: 35148
- Class: B
- Power: 3,000 watts (day); 1,500 watts (night)
- Transmitter coordinates: 26°59′44.2″N 80°11′33.2″W

Links
- Public license information: Public file; LMS
- Webcast: Listen live
- Website: goodkarmabrands.com/espn-west-palm

WEFL (760 AM, "Deportes 760") is a commercial radio station licensed to Tequesta, Florida, United States, and serving the West Palm Beach area. It has a Spanish-language sports format, with most programming supplied by TUDN Radio. The station is owned by Good Karma Sports. WEFL's transmitter is sited off Island Way in Jupiter, Florida, near the Florida Turnpike (Interstate 95).

== History ==
The station went on the air as WBDO on June 22, 1998.

On February 27, 2001, the station changed its call sign to the current WEFL.

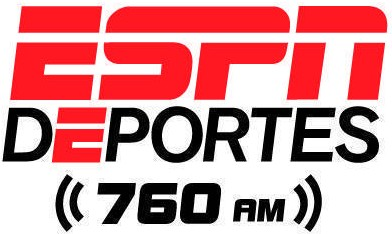
Logo under previous ESPN Deportes Radio affiliation

On September 8, 2019, ESPN Deportes Radio flipped to TUDN Radio.
