= Brewers Hill, Baltimore =

Brewers Hill
- neighborhood statistical area
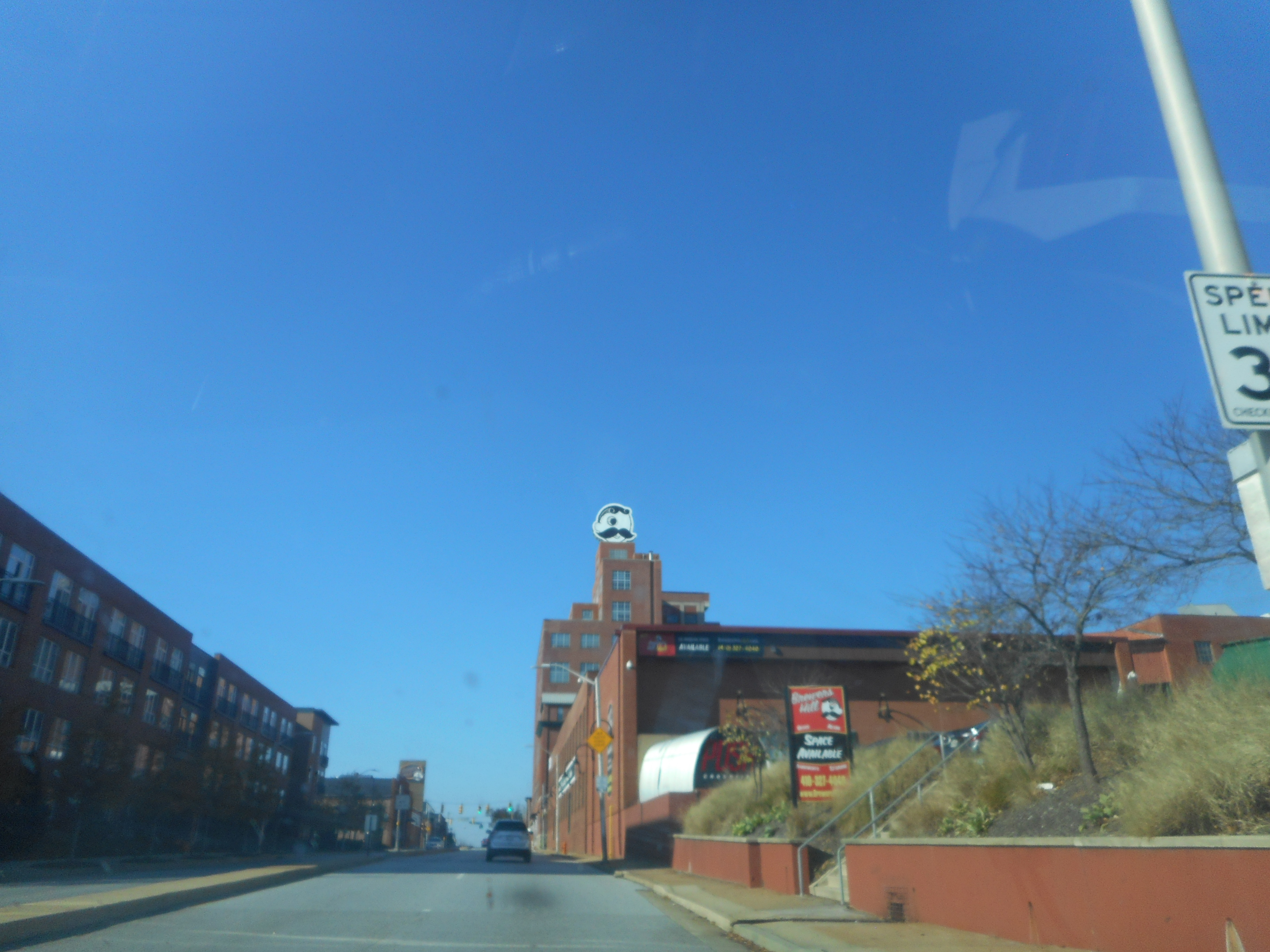
- Natty Boh Brewery
- Interactive map of Brewers Hill
- Country: United States
- State: Maryland
- City: Baltimore

Area
  - Total: 1.07 sq mi (2.8 km^{2})
  - Land: 1.07 sq mi (2.8 km^{2})

Population (2008)
  - Total: 1,505
  - Density: 1,410/sq mi (543/km^{2})
- Time zone: UTC-5 (Eastern)
  - Summer (DST): UTC-4 (EDT)
- ZIP code: 21224
- Area code: 410, 443, and 667
- Brewers Hill Historic District
- U.S. National Register of Historic Places
- U.S. Historic district
- Location within Baltimore Location within Maryland Location within the United States
- Location: Roughly bounded by Eastern Ave., S. Conkling, S. Haven & Dillon Sts.Baltimore, Maryland
- Coordinates: 39°17′1.2″N 76°33′52.6″W
- Area: 45.74 acres (18.51 ha)
- Built: 1870-1940
- Architectural style: Italianate
- NRHP reference No.: 14001070
- Added to NRHP: December 22, 2014

Brewers Hill is a neighborhood in the Southeast District of Baltimore, Maryland, United States.

The neighborhood is bounded by Fleet Street to the north, Haven Street to the east, Boston Street to the south, and Conkling Street to the west. Brewers Hill is south of the Highlandtown and east of the Canton neighborhoods. The city's Canton Industrial Area lies to the south.

The neighborhood's architecture includes a variety of houses built between 1915 and 1920 as the city expanded eastward. The housing includes traditional Baltimore rowhouses built of redbrick and formstone, as well as several "luxury" apartment complexes. Many of the older houses have original architectural features, such as marble steps and porch fronts. In recent years, a number of "luxury" apartment buildings have opened in the neighborhood, including in the redeveloped Gunther Brewing Company, The Porter, Axel Brewers Hill, and The Lucie. A portion of the neighborhood, bounded by Haven, Dillon, Conkling, and Eastern, was listed on the National Register of Historic Places in 2014.

== Significant landmarks ==
=== Natty Boh brewery ===
A neighborhood landmark is the illuminated Mr Boh sign that hangs high above the old National Bohemian brewery. The brewery was established in 1885 and was closely associated with Baltimore's strong German-American community. The brewery was famous for its National Bohemian brand (known in Baltimorese as Natty Boh), also its National Premium Beer, Colt 45 malt liquor, and the introduction of the nation's first six-pack in the 1940s.

The old Natty Boh brewery site is being redeveloped into 737,000 square feet (68,500 m^{2}) of commercial and office space. Plans are for neighboring sites to undergo residential redevelopment as apartments and lofts. In 2013, The Hanover Brewers Hill apartments opened. The development includes mixed use retail and shopping, in addition to a large number of residential units.

== See also ==
- List of Baltimore neighborhoods

== External sources ==
- Live Baltimore - Brewer's Hill
- Brewers Hill redevelopment
- Brewers Hill Historic District, Baltimore City, including undated photo and boundary map, at Maryland Historical Trust
