= Ben Wagner =

American sportscaster (born 1980)

- Born: Benjamin L. Wagner; August 7, 1980 (age 46); New Paris, Indiana, U.S.
- Sports commentary career
- Teams: Toronto Blue Jays (2018–2023); Baltimore Orioles (2024–present)
- Genre: Play-by-play
- Sport: Major League Baseball

Benjamin L. Wagner (born August 7, 1980) is an American sportscaster. As of 2024 he works as a play-by-play announcer for the Baltimore Orioles of Major League Baseball, after having performed the same role for the Toronto Blue Jays from 2018 to 2023.

== Early life ==
Wagner was born in New Paris, Indiana. As a child, he was a fan of the Chicago Cubs. He was hired for his first on-air role in November 1997, with WAWC-FM in Syracuse, Indiana. Wagner attended Indiana State University, where he worked for WISU-FM calling both men's and women's college baseball games, and graduated in December 2003 with a bachelor's degree in radio-TV/film.

== Career ==
In 2004, Wagner began working as the play-by-play announcer and director of media and public relations for the Class-A Lakewood BlueClaws. In the offseason, he worked in the radio booth for the University of Maryland Eastern Shore, calling the Hawks basketball games. On March 19, 2007, Wagner was hired as the play-by-play radio announcer for the Triple-A Buffalo Bisons. He remained in that role with the Bisons until March 27, 2018, when it was announced that he would replace the retiring Jerry Howarth as the lead radio play-by-play announcer for the Bisons' parent club, the Toronto Blue Jays. He was dismissed by Sportsnet on November 28, 2023, in a move that was unpopular with Blue Jays fans. He never got to work with a color commentator who was a former player during his six years, half of which he was never allowed to travel with the ballclub for away games. Critical of Sportsnet's decision, Howarth said, "That was embarrassing for me to see that happen to Ben and the audience across Canada."

Wagner was announced as the newest on-air talent with the Baltimore Orioles on both television and radio three months later on February 23, 2024.
