= Bob Griese =

American football player (born 1945)

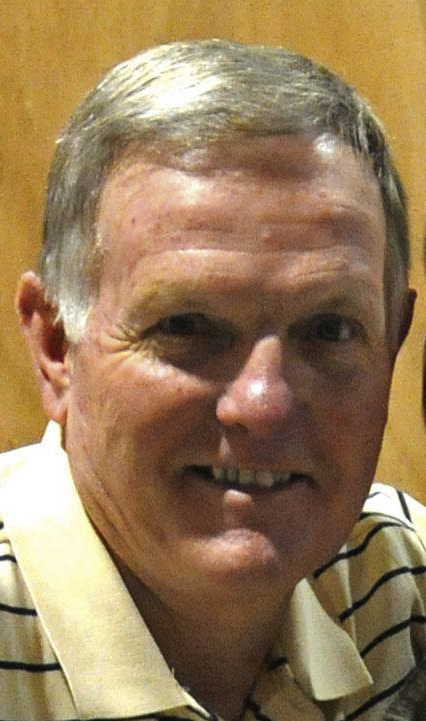
- Griese in 2011

No. 12
- Position: Quarterback

Personal information
- Born: February 3, 1945 (age 81); Evansville, Indiana, U.S.
- Listed height: 6 ft 1 in (1.85 m)
- Listed weight: 190 lb (86 kg)

Career information
- High school: Rex Mundi (Evansville)
- College: Purdue (1963–1966)
- NFL draft: 1967: 1st round, 4th overall pick

Career history
- Miami Dolphins (1967–1980)

Awards and highlights
- 2× Super Bowl champion (VII, VIII); 2× First-team All-Pro (1971, 1977); 6× Pro Bowl (1970, 1971, 1973, 1974, 1977, 1978); NFL passing touchdowns leader (1977); NFL passer rating leader (1977); NFL completion percentage leader (1978); 2× AFL All-Star (1967, 1968); Jim Thorpe Trophy (1971); Bert Bell Award (1977); Miami Dolphins Honor Roll; Miami Dolphins No. 12 retired; Dolphins Walk of Fame (2011); Sammy Baugh Trophy (1966); Consensus All-American (1965); First-team All-American (1966); Chicago Tribune Silver Football (1966); 2× First-team All-Big Ten (1965, 1966)

Career NFL statistics
- Passing attempts: 3,429
- Passing completions: 1,926
- Completion percentage: 56.2%
- Passing yards: 25,092
- TD–INT: 192–172
- Passer rating: 77.1
- Rushing yards: 994
- Rushing touchdowns: 7
- Stats at Pro Football Reference
- Pro Football Hall of Fame
- College Football Hall of Fame

Robert Allen Griese (/ˈɡriːsi/ GREE-see; born February 3, 1945) is an American former professional football player who was a quarterback for 14 seasons with the Miami Dolphins of the American Football League (AFL) and National Football League (NFL). He earned All-American honors playing college football for the Purdue Boilermakers before being selected by the Dolphins of the AFL in the 1967 NFL/AFL draft, at number 4 in the 1st round.

Widely regarded as one of the greatest quarterbacks of the 1970s, Griese led the Dolphins to a then record three consecutive Super Bowl appearances, including two Super Bowl victories in VII and VIII, the first of which capped off Miami's undefeated and untied 1972 season, the only such season in NFL history. Griese was inducted into the College Football Hall of Fame and the Indiana Football Hall of Fame in 1984, and the Pro Football Hall of Fame in 1990. He later worked as a television commentator, calling NFL games for NBC Sports and college football for ESPN and ABC Sports. Griese is one of three quarterbacks from Purdue to win the Super Bowl (along with Len Dawson and Drew Brees).

== Early life ==
Griese was born in Evansville, Indiana, to Ida (Ulrich) and Sylverious "Slick" Griese. Slick owned a plumbing company in Evansville and died in 1955 when his son was ten years old. Bob primarily played baseball and excelled as a pitcher. He also played basketball and football at Evansville's Rex Mundi High School, and earned 12 varsity letters for the Monarchs.

=== Baseball ===
In the summer of 1963, Griese led his American Legion Baseball team, Funkhouser Post #8 of Evansville, Indiana, to the American Legion Baseball World Series as the Region 5 champion. His team did not reach the finals, as the Arthur L. Peterson Post of Long Beach, California, won the title.

=== Basketball ===
He led the basketball team to the No. 1 ranking in Indiana during the 1962–63 season and a record of 19–3. He scored 900 points in his high school career and while being named All-Sectional, he could not lead the Monarchs past Evansville Bosse in the highly competitive Evansville IHSAA Sectional.

=== Football ===
The Monarchs were 15–5 during his Junior (9–1) and Senior (6–4) seasons, as he was named 1st Team All-City for three seasons. After being recruited by several colleges for football, Bob chose Purdue University, where he majored in management (Krannert School of Management) and became a three-sport star.

== College career ==
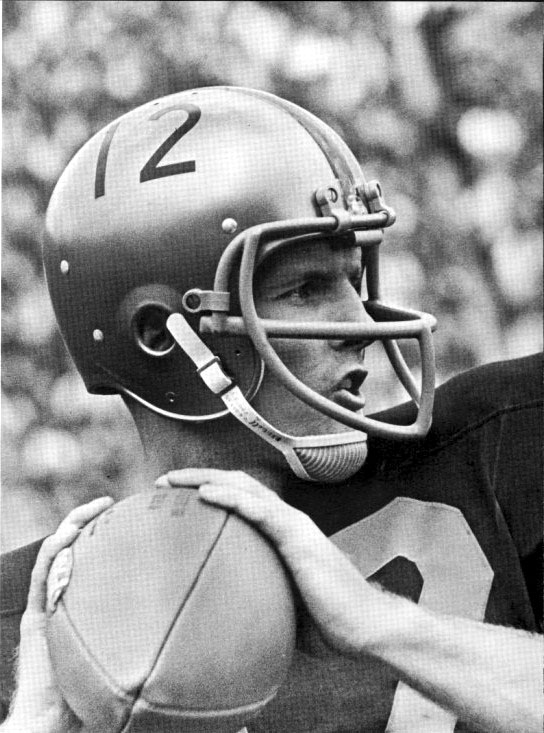
Griese from 1967 Purdue yearbook

While at Purdue, Griese became a member of Sigma Chi fraternity.

Griese pitched for the Purdue baseball team, going 12–1 one season, played guard on the Purdue basketball team, and played quarterback, kicker, and punter for the Purdue football team. There are at least four football games in which Griese was in some way responsible for all of Purdue's points.

As of the beginning of the 2016 NCAA football season, Griese ranks #10 in all-time scoring at Purdue; #5 in scoring among non-kickers and #4 among kickers. Griese's passing skills greatly improved under the tutelage of head coach Jack Mollenkopf and quarterback coach Bob DeMoss.

In his junior year at Purdue in a game against the top-ranked Notre Dame, Griese completed 19 of 22 passes as he led the Boilermakers to an upset win.

Griese was a two-time All-American at Purdue, finishing at No. 8 in the 1965 Heisman Trophy race and was the runner-up to Steve Spurrier for the 1966 Heisman Trophy. Purdue finished second in the Big Ten in 1966, and he led the school's first appearance in the Rose Bowl, where they defeated USC 14–13. He was inducted into the Rose Bowl Hall of Fame in 1992. He also won the Big Ten Medal of Honor for excellence in athletics and academics.

Griese's achievements during his college career earned him induction into the College Football Hall of Fame in 1984. Purdue does not have a practice of retiring jersey numbers, but he was inducted as an inaugural member of the Purdue Intercollegiate Athletic Hall of Fame in 1994.

On December 11, 2014, the Big Ten Network included Griese on "The Mount Rushmore of Purdue Football", as chosen by online fan voting. Griese was joined in the honor by Drew Brees, Rod Woodson, and Leroy Keyes.

== Professional career ==
=== 1967–1969 ===
Griese was selected by the AFL's Miami Dolphins in the first round as the fourth overall pick in the 1967 Common Draft. Griese threw for 2,005 yards and 15 touchdowns his rookie year.

Griese was an AFL All-Star his first two years with the Dolphins, and earned AFL All-Star or AFC-NFC Pro Bowl honors in six additional seasons. While he never put up huge numbers, his leadership played an important role in helping the Dolphins compete in three consecutive Super Bowls, winning the latter two contests.

Griese started the season as the team's second-string quarterback behind John Stofa. When Stofa broke his ankle in the first quarter of the first game of the 1967 season, Griese stepped in and led the Dolphins to a 35–21 victory against the Denver Broncos. The 1967, 1968, and 1969 seasons were tough for the expansion Dolphins. After a difficult 1969 season that was worse than the 1968 season, coach George Wilson was fired.

=== 1970–1976 ===
Dolphins owner Joe Robbie brought in Don Shula from the Baltimore Colts in 1970, and the team's personality and fortunes turned quickly. The Dolphins found a new discipline, and learned what it took to become a winning team. They went from a 3–10–1 record in 1969 to 10–4 in 1970, making the playoffs.

In 1971, the Dolphins made it to the Super Bowl, losing 24–3 to the Dallas Cowboys. Griese was named the 1971 Newspaper Enterprise Association NFL Most Valuable Player award, and won the Jim Thorpe Trophy.

The 1972 season began with the Dolphins winning their first four games. In the fifth game of the season, Griese was tackled hard by Deacon Jones and Ron East of the San Diego Chargers, and went down with a broken leg and dislocated ankle. Earl Morrall, fresh off the waiver wire from Shula's former team, the Baltimore Colts, guided the Dolphins through the rest of the regular season, and maintained an unbeaten record in the process. Morrall also led the NFL in five passing categories during this time, including passer rating. As the playoffs began, the Dolphins were not as strong as they needed to be to go deep into the postseason, barely winning against the Cleveland Browns, a team that they should have beaten easily. The second game of the playoffs the team got off to a slow start against the Pittsburgh Steelers. Shula asked Griese to relieve the ailing Morrall. Griese took the field and completed 3 of 5 passes for 70 yards as the Dolphins beat the Steelers by a score of 21–17 to clinch their second straight Super Bowl appearance.

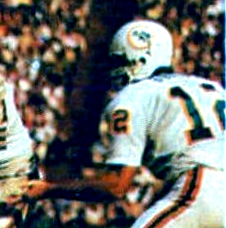
Griese playing for the Dolphins in Super Bowl VII

Despite their unbeaten season, the Dolphins were listed as two point underdogs to the Washington Redskins in Super Bowl VII. Staying with the system that got them there, the Dolphins offense played a perfect ball control game. Griese completed 8 of 11 passes for 88 yards and a touchdown, and Larry Csonka rushed for over 120 yards. Washington's only score was on a returned blocked field goal, and Miami won the game 14–7.

In 1973, Griese led another strong Dolphins team, but they did not make it through the season undefeated. They reached the Super Bowl for the third consecutive season and defeated the Minnesota Vikings 24–7.

In 1974, Griese and the Dolphins had an 11–3 regular-season record, but lost to the Oakland Raiders in the divisional round of the playoffs.

In 1975, Griese and the Dolphins started strong, but late in the season in a game against the Baltimore Colts, Griese suffered a broken toe and was out for the rest of the season. The Dolphins finished a respectable 10–4, but missed out on the playoffs for the first time in the Shula era.

In 1976, the Dolphins had many injuries, and the team finished the season at 6–8, the first time Don Shula ever suffered a losing season in his career.

=== 1977–1980 ===
The 1977 season was a rebound year for both Griese and the Dolphins; he began to wear eyeglasses on the field. On Thanksgiving, Griese threw six touchdown passes in three quarters to defeat the St. Louis Cardinals 55–14, which set a franchise record for most points in a game; the Dolphins scored eight touchdowns and accumulated 34 first downs. He again led the AFC in touchdown passes thrown but the Dolphins rebound to a 10–4 record was again not enough to get the team into the playoffs.

The following year, Griese tore ligaments in his knee in a preseason game. However, when he came back, he was just as strong a passer as he had been the previous year. In one game against the Houston Oilers (nationally telecast as a marquee matchup on ABC's Monday Night Football on November 20), Griese dueled with Oiler running back Earl Campbell in an offensive slugfest. Griese threw for over 300 yards while Campbell rushed for nearly 200 and the Oilers won 35–30. For the year, Griese completed a league-leading 63% of his passes, as the Dolphins went 11–5, losing again to the Oilers in the playoffs.

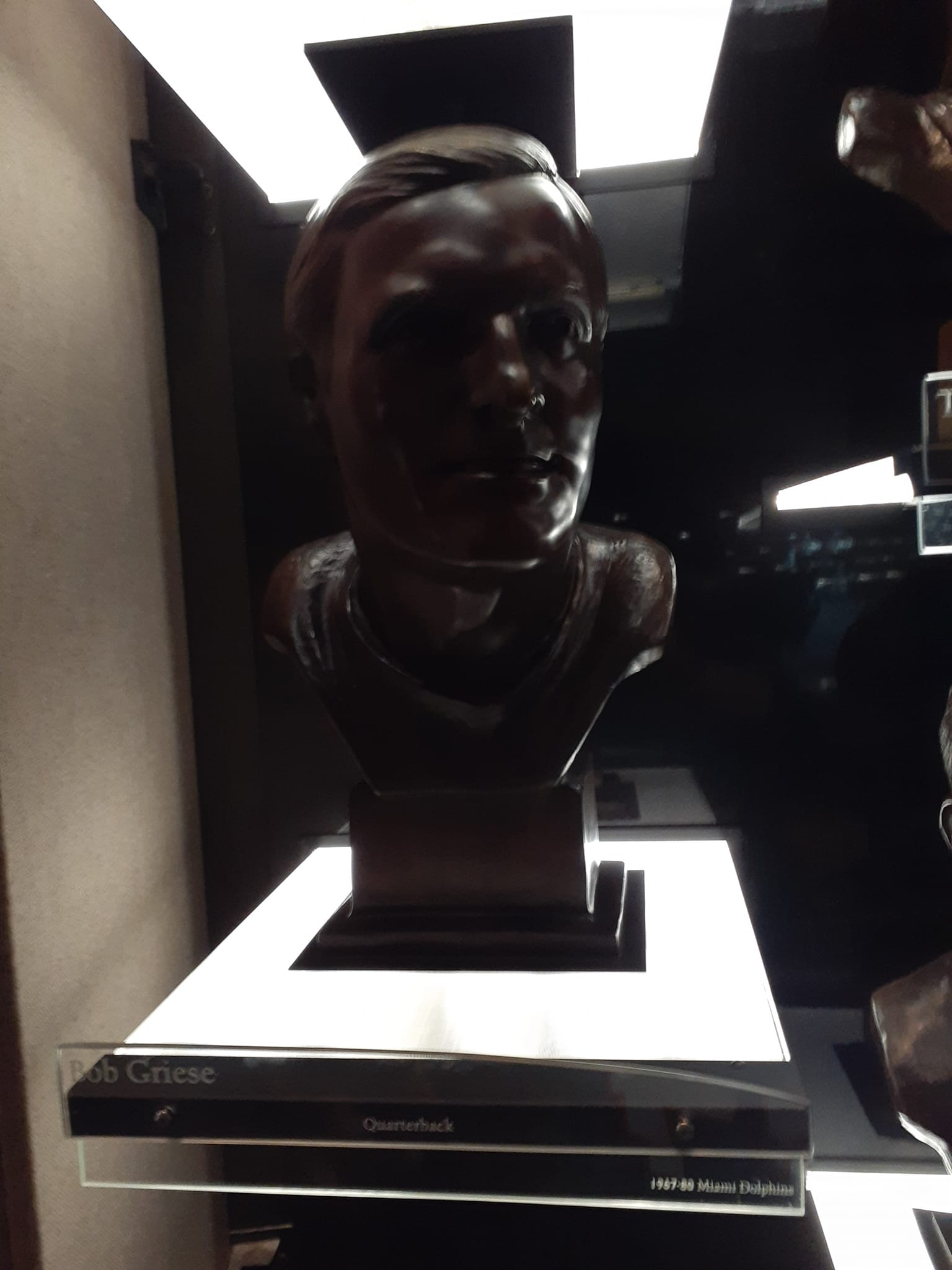
Griese's bronze bust at the Pro Football Hall of Fame.

In 1979, he suffered from some nagging leg injuries that affected his throwing ability. He was not as effective, and he began to hear some criticism. However, he was able to lead the Dolphins to a 10–6 record. The Dolphins then found themselves dominated by the Pittsburgh Steelers in the divisional round of the playoffs.

In 1980, Griese found himself on the bench due to the emergence of Don Strock and rookie David Woodley. However, Griese came off the bench for several games in a row to lead comeback wins. Griese won back the starting spot in the fifth game of the season, but was tackled hard by Mike Ozdowski of the Baltimore Colts. The tackle tore up his shoulder, and he was out for the rest of the year. The injury eventually led to Griese's decision to retire from the game at age 35; he was elected to the Pro Football Hall of Fame in 1990.

He had established his reputation as the “Thinking Man's Quarterback,” as he brilliantly called his own plays throughout his career. Dolphins owner Joe Robbie called him “the cornerstone of the franchise,” around whom the Miami Dolphins were built. Robbie elected to ask Griese to stay on for another year as assistant coach, which he did for the 1981 season, helping Strock and the young Woodley as they teamed to become the famous “Woodstrock.” After the year ended, he decided that he did not like the hours required to be an assistant coach, hoping to devote more time to his family, yet he still enjoyed being part of the game. (Sources for Pro Football Career found in Undefeated, by Bob Griese, 2000, and The Winning Edge by Don Shula, 1974.)

The Miami Dolphins had the highest winning percentage in all professional sports in the 1970s, and Griese was its starting quarterback throughout the decade, except when he was injured for several games in 1972, 1975, and 1978.

In Griese's 14 pro seasons, he threw for 25,092 yards and 192 touchdowns, and also rushed for 994 yards and seven scores. Griese was a six-time Dolphins' MVP and was All-Pro in 1971 and 1977. He played in two AFL All-Star games and six Pro Bowls.

The Dolphins retired his number 12 during a Monday Night Football game in 1985, telecast on ABC, the network which would prominently be featured in his post-football career.

== NFL career statistics ==
Legend
| | Won the Super Bowl |
| | Led the league |
| **Bold** | Career high |

=== Regular season ===
| Year | Team | Games | | | Passing | | | | | | | | Rushing | | | | Sacks | | Fum |
| Year | Team | GP | GS | Record | Cmp | Att | Pct | Yds | Avg | TD | Int | Rtg | Att | Yds | Avg | TD | Sck | SckY | Fum |
|---|---|---|---|---|---|---|---|---|---|---|---|---|---|---|---|---|---|---|---|
| 1967 | MIA | 12 | 10 | 3–7 | 166 | 331 | 50.2 | 2,005 | 6.1 | 15 | **18** | 61.6 | 37 | 157 | 4.2 | 1 | 25 | 240 | 3 |
| 1968 | MIA | 13 | 13 | 5–7–1 | **186** | **355** | 52.4 | **2,473** | 7.0 | 21 | 16 | 75.7 | **42** | **230** | **5.5** | 1 | **43** | **372** | 1 |
| 1969 | MIA | 9 | 9 | 2–6–1 | 121 | 252 | 48.0 | 1,695 | 6.7 | 10 | 16 | 56.9 | 21 | 102 | 4.9 | 0 | 33 | 289 | 5 |
| 1970 | MIA | 14 | 14 | 10–4 | 142 | 245 | 58.0 | 2,019 | 8.2 | 12 | 17 | 72.1 | 26 | 89 | 3.4 | **2** | 31 | 282 | 5 |
| 1971 | MIA | 14 | 13 | 9–3–1 | 145 | 263 | 55.1 | 2,089 | 7.9 | 19 | 9 | **90.9** | 26 | 82 | 3.2 | 0 | 23 | 248 | **9** |
| 1972 | MIA | 6 | 5 | 5–0 | 53 | 97 | 54.6 | 638 | 6.6 | 4 | 4 | 71.6 | 3 | 11 | 3.7 | 1 | 7 | 45 | 0 |
| 1973 | MIA | 13 | 13 | **12–1** | 116 | 218 | 53.2 | 1,422 | 6.5 | 17 | 8 | 84.3 | 13 | 20 | 1.5 | 0 | 11 | 75 | 5 |
| 1974 | MIA | 13 | 13 | 10–3 | 152 | 253 | 60.1 | 1,968 | 7.8 | 16 | 15 | 80.9 | 16 | 66 | 4.1 | 1 | 27 | 202 | 5 |
| 1975 | MIA | 10 | 10 | 7–3 | 118 | 191 | 61.8 | 1,693 | **8.9** | 14 | 13 | 86.6 | 17 | 59 | 3.5 | 1 | 16 | 131 | 2 |
| 1976 | MIA | 13 | 13 | 5–8 | 162 | 272 | 59.6 | 2,097 | 7.7 | 11 | 12 | 78.9 | 23 | 108 | 4.7 | 0 | 30 | 266 | 3 |
| 1977 | MIA | 14 | 14 | 10–4 | 180 | 307 | 58.6 | 2,252 | 7.3 | **22** | 13 | 87.8 | 16 | 30 | 1.9 | 0 | 36 | 303 | 6 |
| 1978 | MIA | 11 | 9 | 6–3 | 148 | 235 | **63.0** | 1,791 | 7.6 | 11 | 11 | 82.4 | 9 | 10 | 1.1 | 0 | 18 | 165 | 3 |
| 1979 | MIA | 14 | 12 | 7–5 | 176 | 310 | 56.8 | 2,160 | 7.0 | 14 | 16 | 72.0 | 11 | 30 | 2.7 | 0 | 26 | 223 | 4 |
| 1980 | MIA | 5 | 3 | 1–2 | 61 | 100 | 61.0 | 790 | 7.9 | 6 | 4 | 89.2 | 1 | 0 | 0.0 | 0 | 9 | 89 | 1 |
| Career | | 161 | 151 | 92–56–3 | 1,926 | 3,429 | 56.2 | 25,092 | 7.3 | 192 | 172 | 77.1 | 261 | 994 | 3.8 | 7 | 335 | 2,930 | 52 |

=== Postseason ===
| Year | Team | Games | | | Passing | | | | | | | | Rushing | | | | Sacks | | Fum |
| Year | Team | GP | GS | Record | Cmp | Att | Pct | Yds | Avg | TD | Int | Rtg | Att | Yds | Avg | TD | Sck | SckY | Fum |
|---|---|---|---|---|---|---|---|---|---|---|---|---|---|---|---|---|---|---|---|
| 1970 | MIA | 1 | 1 | 0–1 | 13 | 27 | 48.1 | 155 | 5.7 | **2** | 1 | 75.4 | 1 | 2 | 2.0 | 0 | **3** | 31 | **2** |
| 1971 | MIA | 3 | 3 | 2–1 | **36** | **66** | 54.5 | **555** | 8.4 | **2** | **4** | 67.4 | 4 | 21 | 5.3 | 0 | **3** | **45** | 1 |
| 1972 | MIA | 2 | 1 | 1–0 | 11 | 16 | **68.8** | 158 | **9.9** | 1 | 1 | **95.3** | 0 | 0 | — | 0 | 2 | 19 | 0 |
| 1973 | MIA | 3 | 3 | **3–0** | 20 | 31 | 64.5 | 266 | 8.6 | **2** | 2 | 86.2 | **5** | **46** | **9.2** | 0 | 2 | 18 | 0 |
| 1974 | MIA | 1 | 1 | 0–1 | 7 | 14 | 50.0 | 101 | 7.2 | 1 | 1 | 67.9 | 2 | 14 | 7.0 | 0 | 2 | 20 | 0 |
| 1978 | MIA | 1 | 1 | 0–1 | 11 | 28 | 39.3 | 114 | 4.1 | 1 | 2 | 33.9 | 0 | 0 | — | 0 | 0 | 0 | 0 |
| 1979 | MIA | 1 | 1 | 0–1 | 14 | 26 | 53.8 | 118 | 4.5 | 1 | 1 | 62.7 | 1 | 1 | 1.0 | 0 | **3** | 19 | 0 |
| Career | | 12 | 11 | 6–5 | 112 | 208 | 53.8 | 1,467 | 7.1 | 10 | 12 | 68.3 | 13 | 84 | 6.5 | 0 | 15 | 152 | 3 |

=== Super Bowl ===
| Game | Opp. | Cmp | Att | Pct | Yds | Avg | TD | Int | Rtg | Result |
|---|---|---|---|---|---|---|---|---|---|---|
| VI | DAL | **12** | **23** | 52.2 | **134** | 5.8 | 0 | **1** | 51.7 | L 3–24 |
| VII | WAS | 8 | 11 | 72.7 | 88 | 8.0 | **1** | **1** | 88.4 | **W** 14–7 |
| VIII | MIN | 6 | 7 | **85.7** | 73 | **10.4** | 0 | 0 | **110.1** | **W** 24–7 |
| Totals | | 26 | 41 | 63.4 | 295 | 7.2 | 1 | 2 | 72.7 | W−L 2–1 |

== Life after football ==
=== NBC Sports ===
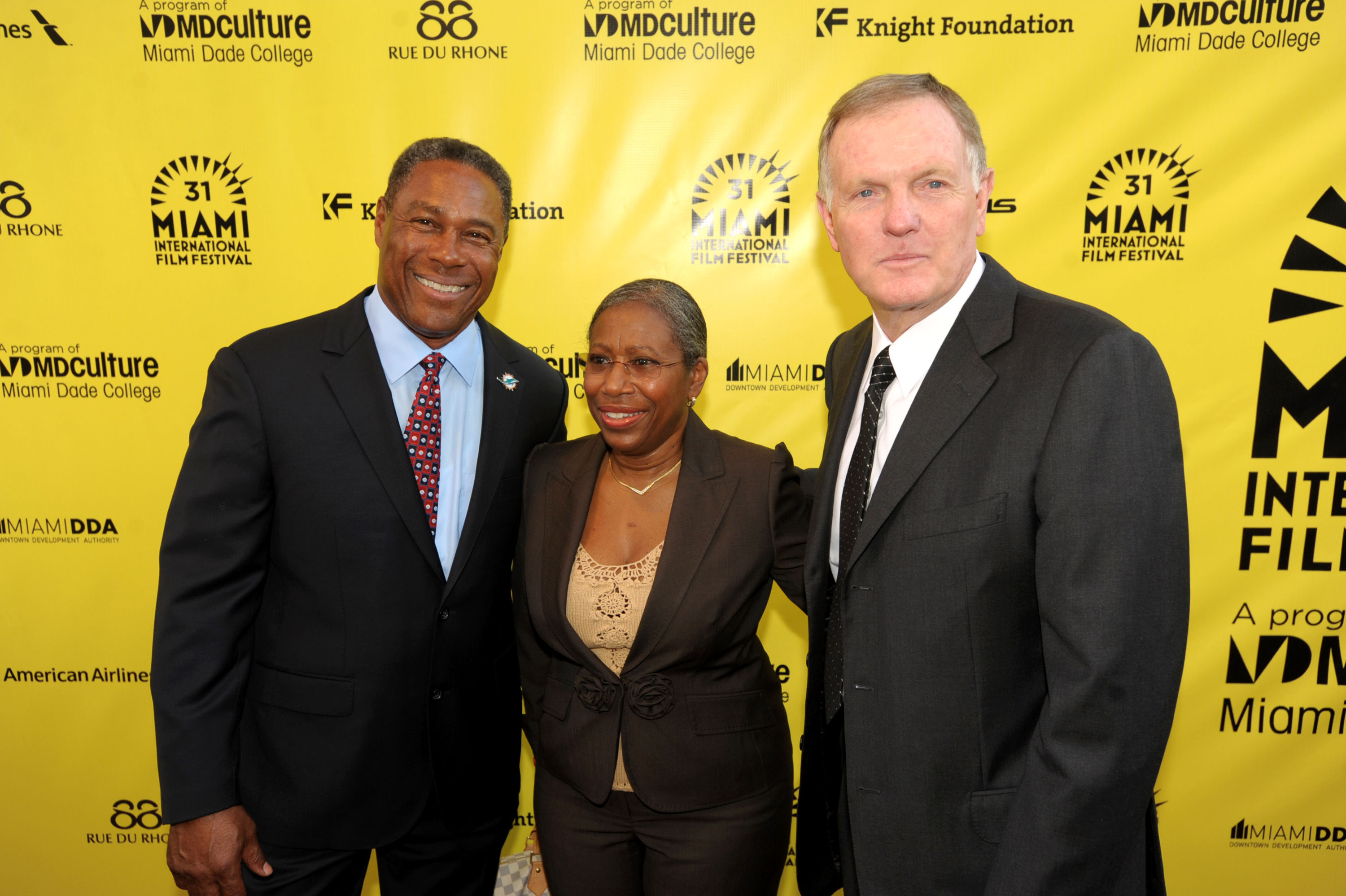
Nat Moore, guest and Griese at the 2014 Miami International Film Festival

To stay in touch with the game, in 1982 Griese decided to take a job as an announcer for NBC Sports, teaming with Charlie Jones for NFL games. While there, he called Super Bowl XX.

=== ABC Sports ===
In 1987, Griese was hired by ABC Sports, where he began to provide color commentary for college football games.

While at ABC, Griese called the 1999, 2001, and 2005 BCS National Championship games.

At ABC, Griese had many opportunities to watch his son Brian Griese play for the Michigan Wolverines. ABC was at first reluctant to let Griese broadcast Michigan games, fearing a conflict of interest. But when they decided to give it a try, Bob remained as impartial and professional as he could be, even referring to his son as “Griese,” rather than Brian, and pointing out errors when he felt necessary.

On January 1, 1998, Bob got to broadcast the Rose Bowl game, the last college game of his son's career. Brian was named MVP of the game, leading his Wolverines to an undefeated season and the national championship title with their Rose Bowl victory. Bob and Brian were emotional at that moment, as they thought of Bob's wife Judi, who had died from breast cancer in 1988 but whom they both felt was there at that special moment. Bob and Brian later wrote a book, entitled Undefeated (ISBN 0-7852-7021-3), which discussed not only their football connection, but also their love for Judi.

=== ESPN ===
During the 2009 and 2010 seasons, Griese served as the lead commentator for ESPN's noon college football broadcasts. He retired from ESPN on February 3, 2011.

=== Miami Dolphins broadcasts ===
Griese has been an analyst for Miami Dolphins preseason TV broadcasts since 2002.

In 2011, he joined the Dolphins radio broadcast team as a color commentator, replacing former teammate Jim Mandich.

== Personal life ==
Griese married Purdue classmate Judi Lassus in June 1967, following their graduation, and they had three sons: Brian, Jeff, and Scott. A nurse, Judi lost a six-year battle with breast cancer at age 44 in early 1988. He now resides with his second wife, Shay, in Jupiter, Florida and Banner Elk, North Carolina. His youngest son is Brian Griese (b. 1975), who also played quarterback in the NFL. His grandson, Jack Griese, son of Scott, is a running back for the University of Virginia.

In 2006, Griese made an appearance on the game show, Wheel of Fortune: he won the $100,000 grand prize and donated his $114,310 total winnings to Judi's House.

In 1975, Griese received the Golden Plate Award of the American Academy of Achievement.

== See also ==
- List of American Football League players
