= Randy Mattingly =

American football player (born 1951)

Profile
- Position: Quarterback

Personal information
- Born: May 15, 1951 (age 75); Evansville, Indiana, U.S.
- Listed height: 6 ft 4 in (1.93 m)
- Listed weight: 205 lb (93 kg)

Career information
- High school: Rex Mundi (Evansville, Indiana)
- College: Evansville
- NFL draft: 1973: 4th round, 100th overall pick

Career history
- Cleveland Browns (1973)*; Chicago Bears (1973)*; Buffalo Bills (1973)*; Cincinnati Bengals (1973)*; Saskatchewan Roughriders (1974–1975); Hamilton Tiger-Cats (1976)
- * Offseason or practice squad member only

Awards and highlights
- 2× All-ICC (1971, 1972)

Career CFL statistics
- Comp-Att: 61–124
- Passing yards: 812
- TD–INT: 5–12

Randy Mattingly (born May 15, 1951) is a former gridiron football quarterback who played in the Canadian Football League (CFL). He played college football at Evansville.

== College career ==
Mattingly attended Florida State as a freshman but left and moved back to Evansville after his older brother died in a construction accident. He enrolled at the University of Evansville and was named All-Indiana Collegiate Conference as a junior and as a senior. He also competed in baseball, basketball, and track and field for Evansville.

== Professional career ==
Mattingly was selected 100th overall in the fourth round of the 1973 NFL draft by the Cleveland Browns. He was cut at the end of training camp and spent the 1973 season on the practice squads of the Browns, Chicago Bears, Buffalo Bills and Cincinnati Bengals. He was signed by the Saskatchewan Roughriders of the Canadian Football League (CFL) in 1974 and spent two seasons with the team as a backup and completed 35 of 65 passes for 553 yards and four touchdowns with six interceptions. Mattingly was signed by the Hamilton Tiger-Cats in 1976, where he was primarily used as a punter but also started at quarterback in place of injured starter Jimmy Jones.

== Personal life ==
Mattingly is the older brother of former Major League Baseball player and manager Don Mattingly.
