= Rex Mundi High School =

Former Catholic high school in Evansville, Indiana, USA

Coordinates: 38°00′42.2″N 87°34′23.1″W

Rex Mundi High School was a Catholic high school in Evansville, Indiana. Its name comes from the Latin King of the World. The premises are now used for Ivy Tech Community College's Evansville Campus.

It opened in the fall of 1958 in a rapidly expanding area close to what was then the north city limits of Evansville. The Country Club Meadows and Country Club Manor subdivisions opened in the early to mid 1950s in the immediate vicinity of the Rex Mundi site. At the time of the opening of the high school, the Diocese of Evansville maintained a strict policy requiring those registered in Catholic parishes to send their children to diocesan schools. While it required an entrance exam for admissions (and exempted those who failed from the required attendance in the Catholic school system), Rex Mundi benefited from the diocesan attendance policy and soon was full to overflowing.

The school was closed by the diocese in March 1972. Famous alumni include former All-American quarterback Bob Griese.

== History ==
=== Background ===
The effects of World War II had many implications for most of the world. One post-war outcome was the massive worldwide increase of births between 1946 and 1964, known as the Baby Boom. Approximately 76 million boomers were born in the United States, accounting for 29% of the population. The generations immense size brought them economic powers, rises in electronic mass media, and a high level of education. However, obtaining this high level of educational success did not come easily. Despite the positive reflections, this unexpected event inflicted problems on the nation as well. Because of the high fertility rate, more students than ever flooded into schools. Based on elementary school enrollment, there were expected to be 3,700 Catholic high school students by 1964. Mater Dei and Reitz Memorial were the only Catholic schools for these students to be distributed to. Reitz Memorial was built to hold 500 students and was handling almost twice that many. Mater Dei, built for 600, was almost as crowded. Classrooms became quickly overcrowded as the capacity of students reached its maximum. Bishop Grimmelsman decided that there was no other alternative but to build a new school.

=== Opening ===
In 1956 the decision was made to open the third catholic high school in Evansville, Rex Mundi. Fifteen acres of land was purchased from Mr. and Mrs. Ollie Heerdink. Rex Mundi was constructed by Virgil Miller, who was also responsible for planning other schools within the diocese. Located on First Avenue near Buena Vista, the school is expected to hold 700 to 750 pupils. On opening day, Rex Mundi welcomed 280 students, of which about 200 were freshmen, and the remaining were sophomores. Enrollment was expected to reach 800 in several years.

=== Early years ===
The high school began with a Catholic priest, Father Charles Meny, as superintendent, and with priests, nuns (Sisters of St. Francis of Oldenburg, Indiana) and a few lay teachers making up the faculty. The school "tracked" its students for most courses, providing basic college prep courses as well as business and home economics courses that those in college prep were not allowed to take—at least in the first several years of the school's tenure. Priests taught all religion courses, and religion was a required subject. An outstanding strength of the school was its mathematics department, headed up by Franciscan Sister Theresa Marie. Under her guidance the school captured medals in state math competitions for several years, beginning soon after Rex Mundi opened. The sports program, particularly the basketball team, also garnered attention statewide. Graduating in the class of 1963, basketball team captain Bob Griese went on to fame in college and professional football.

Father Meny kept strict control over the day-to-day workings of the school. Unlike another Catholic high school in Evansville, Reitz Memorial, which boasted separate programs for young women and young men within the same building, Rex Mundi's boys and girls attended classes together. (Religion, biology and gym classes were separated by gender.) Into at least the middle 1960s a demerit system drove the discipline policy of the institution, and speaking to members of the opposite sex in the hallways was against the school rules, resulting in demerits. (A diocese- wide rule book for Catholic high school students forbade dating before the age of 16 and bringing a non-Catholic boyfriend or girlfriend to school dances; infractions of these rules often resulted in calls to parents.) Other rules were typical of schools of the time and included proscription of talking in class, disobeying direct orders from teachers, etc. An accumulation of a certain amount of demerits triggered suspension or expulsion. A visit to Father Meny for disciplinary action was a serious matter at Rex Mundi High School in the early years.

=== Closing ===
By 1971, Rex Mundi became a victim of falling enrollment and pressing finances. Enrollment in the Catholic high schools fell dramatically from 2,530 students in 1967 to only 1,900 in 1971. With the extreme decline of incoming students, the need for three Catholic schools was not necessary. Ultimately, the only option was to shut down one of the Catholic high schools. Reitz Memorial was quickly taken out of the equation because it was the founding school and centrally located. The decision process of whether to close Rex Mundi or Mater Dei was contemplated for three months before a conclusion was finally made.

On February 29, 1972, Peter Taromina, of the Area Catholic School Board, made the motion to retain Mater Dei and Reitz Memorial high schools. This motion was seconded by Wilbur “Red” Walker. The board voted 7–4 to close Rex Mundi. The results were taken to Diocesan Council who voted 12–4 to close the school. On March 29, 1972, the decision to close Rex Mundi was made official. The students, administrators, graduates, and families were all strongly affected by the decision.

If the Rex Mundi students chose to continue in the Catholic high school system, their options were either be transferred to Mater Dei or Reitz Memorial. Juniors were allowed to decide which school they wanted to attend, however, underclassmen had to go to the school in their district. They began visiting Mater Dei and Reitz Memorial high schools to become acquainted with future classmates and teachers. Each day, fifteen Rex Mundi students from the freshmen, sophomore, and junior classes spent their school day at one of the two schools. A Rex Mundi student was assigned a student at the host school with similar academic interests to provide a tour. This allowed the Rex Mundi student to get an idea of what the classes at his or her new school would be like. The school board was "firmly committed" to providing adequate transportation.

The Evansville Catholic Diocese put the former Rex Mundi convent up for sale. On March 22, 1975, George Utley, director of Ivy Tech, purchased the old Rex Mundi convent for $1.5 million for the state. More than half of the proceeds from the sales of Rex Mundi was used to pay off old debts. With the closing of Rex Mundi, faculty had to be distributed elsewhere. Catholic school officials were responsible for the employment of staff and faculty for the two remaining Catholic high schools in Evansville. The selection of faculty depended on a basis of need, competence, and seniority.

== Notable alumni ==
- Bob Griese: All-American quarterback at Purdue University, All-Pro for Miami Dolphins, Member of the Professional, College and Indiana Football Halls of Fame, Class of 1963.
- Tom Niemeier: All-American (2d team College Division), Letterman Purdue Boilermakers (1964–65); 2x Letterman Evansville Purple Aces (1966–67, 1967–68), Parade All-American (1962–63), Class of 1963.
- Randy Mattingly: All-Conference quarterback at University of Evansville, Quarterback, Punter for Saskatchewan Roughriders, Hamilton Tiger-Cats, Class of 1969.
