= Bob Gallagher (sportscaster) =

American sportscaster and radio host

Robert L. Gallagher (May 1, 1928 – July 3, 1977) was an American sportscaster and radio host who announced games for the Boston Patriots and Miami Dolphins.

== Early life ==
Gallagher graduated from North Quincy High School in 1946 and Boston College 1951. After college, he enlisted in the United States Army, where he served at General Douglas MacArthur's headquarters in Japan. He later earned a degree from Curry College and spent six years as a semi-pro basketball player.

== Broadcasting career ==
In 1954, Gallagher landed as first broadcasting job at WNEB in Worcester, Massachusetts. He left the station in 1958 to call Boston College Eagles football games for WEEI. From 1960 to 1964, Gallagher was the radio play by play announcer for the Boston Patriots. He then spent a year as the sports director at WNAC-TV in Boston.

From 1967 to 1969, Gallagher was the radio announcer for the Miami Dolphins. He also worked for WTVJ in Miami, where he was sports director and announced Dolphins preseason games.

After leaving WTVJ, Gallagher worked for the Flagler Dog Track in Miami. In 1974, he returned to Massachusetts, where he served as the vice-president of marketing for Carley Associates of Braintree.

== Death ==
Gallagher died on July 3, 1977, at Massachusetts General Hospital in Boston. He was 48 years old. He left behind his wife, Audrey, and children Paul, Laura, Robert, Peter and Mark. At the time of his death he was residing in Scituate, Massachusetts. He was buried in Mount Wollaston Cemetery in Quincy, Massachusetts.
