= Bob Lamey =

American sportscaster

Bob Lamey (born December 23, 1938) is an American sportscaster, formerly the radio play-by-play announcer for the Indianapolis Colts of the National Football League. Lamey had been "The Voice of the Colts" after the team moved to Indianapolis in 1984, except from 1992 to 1994, serving in that capacity until his retirement in 2018.

== Career ==
Lamey previously served as radio voice of the NBA's Indiana Pacers (1977–84) and two defunct hockey teams, the Indianapolis Racers of the WHA and the Indianapolis Checkers of the IHL. Affectionately known as "Hockey Bob" upon first arriving on the Indianapolis sports scene in the 1970s, Lamey was also sports director of Indianapolis radio station WIBC and, from 1988 to 2000, worked as a turn reporter on the Indianapolis Motor Speedway Radio Network. He also provided play-by-play for the national telecast of the 100th Monon Bell Classic.

Prior to coming to Indianapolis, Lamey served for five years as the voice of the ABA's Carolina Cougars. He served as sports director of WSOC-TV in Charlotte, NC, after the departure of Bill "Mouth of the South" Currie. Lamey also broadcast Charlotte Checkers (Eastern Hockey League) games from 1964 to 1972 on WSOC 930AM.

In August 2018, Lamey suddenly announced his retirement. A report revealed he had used an uncensored racial slur while telling a story to an African American colleague. Lamey claimed that he was repeating a story told to him by racing driver Derek Daly, who was promptly fired from his job with WISH-TV. Daly disputes Lamey's story, which led to him filing suit against Lamey. In 2021, the charge of conspiracy to defraud against Lamey was dismissed, but he faces five counts of defamation, tortious interference of business, tortious interference of a business relationship, and another count of punitive damages.

== Personal life ==
Lamy was born in Chester, Pennsylvania but grew up in Victoria, Texas. He graduated from Texas Christian University and later earned a master's degree from Ohio University. Lamey lives with his second wife, Kim, in Indianapolis. He has three daughters, two stepdaughters, and one stepson. He has seven grandchildren and five step-grandchildren.

Lamey is a "die-hard" New York Yankees fan.
