= Gunther Brewing Company =

Mixed-use in Baltimore, Maryland, U.S.

The Gunther
- Interior of Gunther & Co. (August 2026)

General information
- Type: Mixed-use
- Location: Baltimore, Maryland, U.S., 1211 S. Conkling St, 21224 (Gunther Apartments); 3560 Toone Street, 21224 (Gunther & Co.)
- Owner: Obrecht Properties LLC
- Operator: Kettler Management Company (Gunther Apartments); Nancy Hart Trice and Jerry Trice (Gunther & Co.)

Design and construction
- Architects: RM Sovich Architecture (Gunther Apartments); Bates Architects PC (Gunther & Co.)
- Developer: Obrecht Commercial Real Estate
- Main contractor: Kinsley Construction (Gunther Apartments); Heffner & Weber (Gunther & Co.)

Website
- www.thegunther.com (apartments); eatatgunther.com (restaurant)
- Gunther Brewing Company
- U.S. National Register of Historic Places
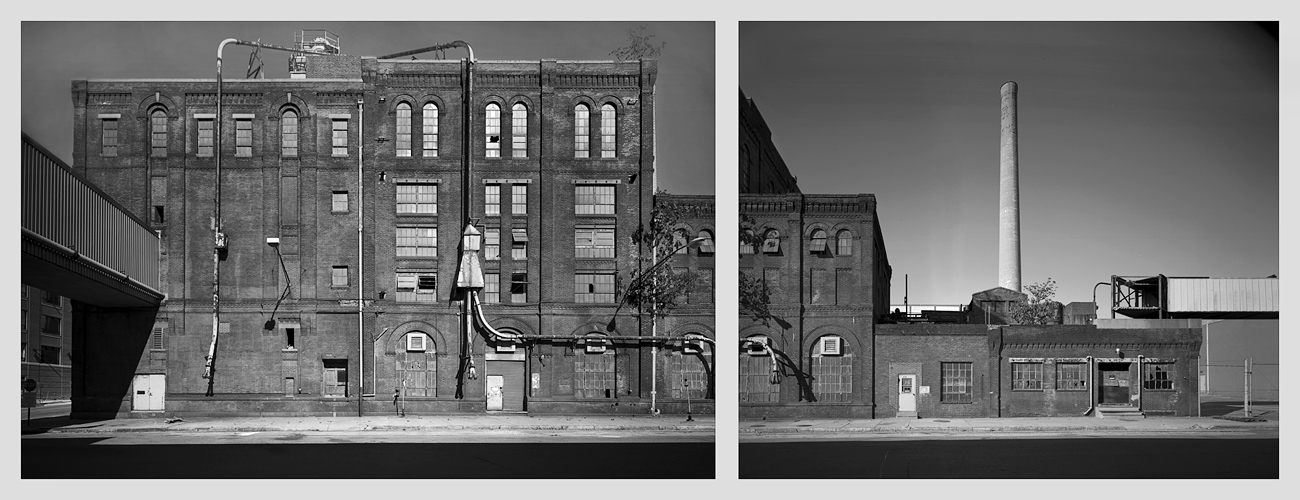
- South wall of the old Gunther Brewery in Canton, southeast Baltimore, November 2011

- Location within Baltimore Location within Maryland Location within the United States
- Location: 1200, 1211, 1301 S. Conkling St, 3601, 3701 O'Donnell St, east side S. Conkling St, rear east side of S. Conkling St, 3560 Toone St, 21224
- Coordinates: 39°16′44.9″N 76°33′58.3″W
- Area: Canton
- Built: 1900
- Architect: Otto C. Wolf
- Architectural style: Romanesque, Moderne, et al.
- NRHP reference No.: 02001607
- Added to NRHP: December 26, 2002

Gunther Brewing Company is a historic brewery, and industrial building complex, located in the Canton neighborhood of southeast Baltimore, Maryland, United States. Actual brewing operations ended in 1978, and the property has been redeveloped into an apartment complex and a restaurant in the 2010s as part of the Brewers Hill project.

== History ==
=== Background ===
George Gunther, Sr., born in Wirtheim, Germany, immigrated to the United States in 1866, and applied his brewing skills first in New York. In 1870, he moved to Baltimore, Maryland to serve as brewmaster for the Gehl Brewery, which he took control of in 1880 to create his own business at Conkling and Dillon streets.

In 1899, Gunther Sr. sold his business of 20 years to the Maryland Brewing Company, a syndicate that was consolidating many of the city's breweries into a "brewing trust". While Gunther Sr. could not contractually compete with the trust, his son was under no such restriction, and the Gunther's took advantage of the loophole. In 1900, George Gunther, Jr. founded a new, independent brewery directly across the street from his father's original plant, known as the George Gunther, Jr. Brewing Company. The trust filed a lawsuit to stop the new venture, but the case was unsuccessful. During this period, Gunther Sr. was president of the same trust that was suing his son, a conflict the courts ultimately ruled in Gunther's favor.

The new brewery, sometimes spelled "Guenther" in its early days, was designed by the Philadelphia, Pennsylvania-based architect Otto C. Wolf as a model brewery, which began construction on February 10, 1900. The complex, located in the Canton neighborhood, consisted of 15 masonry buildings constructed with modern materials like granite foundations and pressed brick. Its centerpiece was the five-story, L-shaped, Romanesque Revival brewhouse, with a two-story brick ice plant built about 1910 and one- and two-story boiler room. The Gunther family lived at the Bankard-Gunther Mansion on Butcher's Hill until the death of Gunther Sr. in 1912. The George Gunther, Jr. Brewing Company was renamed Gunther Brewing Company in 1934.

By 1959, Gunther was the second largest brewery in Baltimore, one of the major centers of brewing in America, and the Gunther brewery was a major local employer with a staff of over 600, and an annual production capacity of 800,000 barrels. The company was acquired by the St. Paul, Minnesota-based Hamm's Brewing Company in 1960. The brewery was sold again to F. & M. Schaefer Brewing Company of New York in 1963, and the larger Tuffolk Factory and Warehouse was constructed in 1964. Schaefer continued to produce the Gunther brand until the plant ceased operations in 1978 due to a gradual decline. After the permanent closure, large portions of the rear walls of some buildings were demolished to facilitate salvage, and the buildings sat abandoned and structurally decayed for decades.

=== 2002–present: NRHP listing and redevelopment ===
Interior of Gunther & Co. (August 2026)

Around 1999, Obrecht Properties LLC began acquiring properties for the 30-acre (12 ha) Brewers Hill development parcel, starting with the National Brewing complex, with the "Natty Boh Tower" office and self-storage conversions. Since the complex lacked the required windows for housing, the developers pivoted to the former Gunther Brewing complex, which was added to the National Register of Historic Places in 2002. By then, the buildings served as a plant for Tulkoff's Horseradish, east of the Canton Historic District.

Obrecht Commercial Real Estate redeveloped the complex into Gunther Apartments, or "The Gunther", which opened in 2014 as an adaptive reuse apartment and loft complex at 1211 S. Conkling Street. The redevelopment was designed by RM Sovich Architecture, which preserved original architecture elements such as heavy timber, exposed brick, historic brewery vats, and industrial doors, while integrating modern floor plans and interiors.

However, the main building at 3560 Toone Street remained vacant. Obrecht invested in $3.5 million, which was required to redevelop that structure into a two-story restaurant run by restauranteurs Nancy Hart Mola and Chef Jerry Trice, which took over the raw space. On April 8, 2016, the restaurant was announced to be known as Gunther & Co., which had its grand opening on May 20, 2016, with 7,600 square feet (710 m^{2}), a 16 feet (190 in) plant wall, soaring 34 feet (10 m) cathedral ceilings, and a "smokestack" kitchen. Weathered white-and-rusted steel beams and exposed brick were preserved, alongside a salvaged conveyor belt. An expansive, 70-seat outdoor patio also features a garden. In September 2024, construction on an adjacent apartment building, AVA Brewers Hill, started.
