= Colt 45 (malt liquor) =

Brand of malt liquor

- Type: malt liquor
- Manufacturer: Pabst Brewing Company; Asia Brewery (Philippines) Sleeman Breweries (Canada)
- Origin: United States
- Introduced: 1963; 63 years ago
- Alcohol by volume: 5.6% 8% (Canada)
- Style: Malt liquor
- Website: colt45maltliquor.com

Colt 45 is an American brand of lager or malt liquor made and primarily marketed in the United States and Canada, originally introduced by National Brewing Company in the spring of 1963. Through a series of mergers and acquisitions, the National Brewing Company and its brands (including Colt 45) are today owned by the Pabst Brewing Company.

Colt 45 is available today in a multitude of packages and sizes.

== History ==
National Brewing Company introduced Colt 45 in 1963. Previously, the only major national brand of malt liquor was Country Club. The label was designed with a kicking horse and horseshoe, a reference to its "extra kick" compared to competing brands. Listed on the Pabst website as a "Fun Fact", Colt 45 was named after running back Jerry Hill of the 1963 Baltimore Colts, who wore the number 45 and not the .45 caliber handgun ammunition round. The credited name change came because of malt liquor’s association with violence in disenfranchised neighborhoods. However, Hill described the claim as a "rumor," and stated that he never made any endorsements or received any royalties for the use of his name. In a 2020 interview, Hill stated that "They wanted to name the product Colt 45 … I just happened to be the Colt who was wearing 45."

=== Advertising ===
Throughout most of the 1960s and 1970s, Colt 45 was marketed towards the suburban white-collar middle class demographic. To this end, in a memorable ad campaign that lasted over 15 years, Billy Van portrayed a gentleman in suit and tie quietly sitting at a small table and taking little notice of activity around him, patiently waiting for a waiter or someone else to arrive with a schooner glass and a can of Colt 45. Music resembling "Song of the Nairobi Trio" played in the background while a voice-over announcer intoned:

In the dull and commonplace occurrences of day-to-day living, one thing stands out as a completely unique experience: Colt 45 Malt Liquor.

In subsequent commercials, the surroundings became increasingly peculiar, including, but not limited to:

- sitting on the shore of a busy beach
- at the end of an airport runway
- on an ice rink, in front of the goal during a hockey game
- in a bullring, during a bullfight
- The Nairobi Trio appeared alongside of Van in one commercial from the late 60s.
- an encounter with a shark in the middle of the ocean or bay (referenced after the release of the movie Jaws)
- at the bottom of a ski jump (which featured a cameo by Redd Foxx)
- a chorus line of dancing girls come out and sing the jingle about "the malt in a Colt 45".

The one constant in each commercial was Van, who remained unperturbed while sitting at the table, though sometimes he became indirectly involved in the tumult unfolding around him. Van won a 1975 Clio Award for one of these commercials.

=== "That Dynamite Taste" ===
By 1978, the "waiting man" commercials were replaced with more contemporary ads and the slogan "That Dynamite Taste"; one of those commercials briefly featured an unknown Ted Danson. Beginning in 1980, Colt 45 began a long association with actor Billy Dee Williams, who appeared in their print, television, and billboard ads. The product's slogan during that era, as stated by Williams in his television commercials, was, "It works every time." Williams responded indifferently to criticism of his appearances in the liquor commercials.

== Related products ==
In the early 1990s, Colt 45 makers experimented briefly with a mint-flavored derivative, marketed under the name Cool Colt. Available in limited quantities, it was largely met with puzzlement from loyal customers. Its slogan was "Taste the Cool." Apparently, it was designed to pair with menthol cigarettes.

Another variety of Colt 45 introduced in the early 1990s was Colt 45 Silver. Like regular Colt 45, it was a malt based beer but had a lower alcohol concentration and was clear. The can was blue with silver horses running below the Colt 45 logo. The can also boasted it as a "Deluxe Malt Liquor". It was marketed as being a "sophisticated" brand of beer.

A double malt version—titled Colt 45 Double Malt—was also produced; and in certain regions such as Montana, had 8.5% abv. Sold in only certain regions, the label was distinguishable by two horseshoes rather than the standard one. It was discontinued in the early 2000s.

In 2011, Pabst Brewing introduced Blast by Colt 45. Snoop Dogg signed on to promote the beverage as Blast's "brand ambassador". The 12% ABV fruit-flavored malt beverage has been criticized for targeting underage drinkers. In order to comply with FDA regulations, Blast by Colt does not contain caffeine, taurine, or guarana. Some flavors of the drink included Fruit Punch, Strawberry-Lemonade, Raspberry-Watermelon, Grape, and Blueberry-Pomegranate.

Beginning in 2026, Stroh Brewery Company began selling Colt 45-branded hard soda in Canada under the Colt 45 Kick trademark.
