= Linda Rich (photographer) =

American photographer

- Born: 1949 (age 76–77); Cleveland, Ohio
- Known for: documentary photography

Linda Rich (born 1949) is an American documentary photographer. With Elinor Cahn and Joan Clark Netherwood, she was a founder and active participant in the East Baltimore Documentary Survey Project between 1975 and 1980. Her work is included in the collections of the Smithsonian American Art Museum and the Art Institute of Chicago.
