= Chuck Thompson (sportscaster) =

American sportscaster

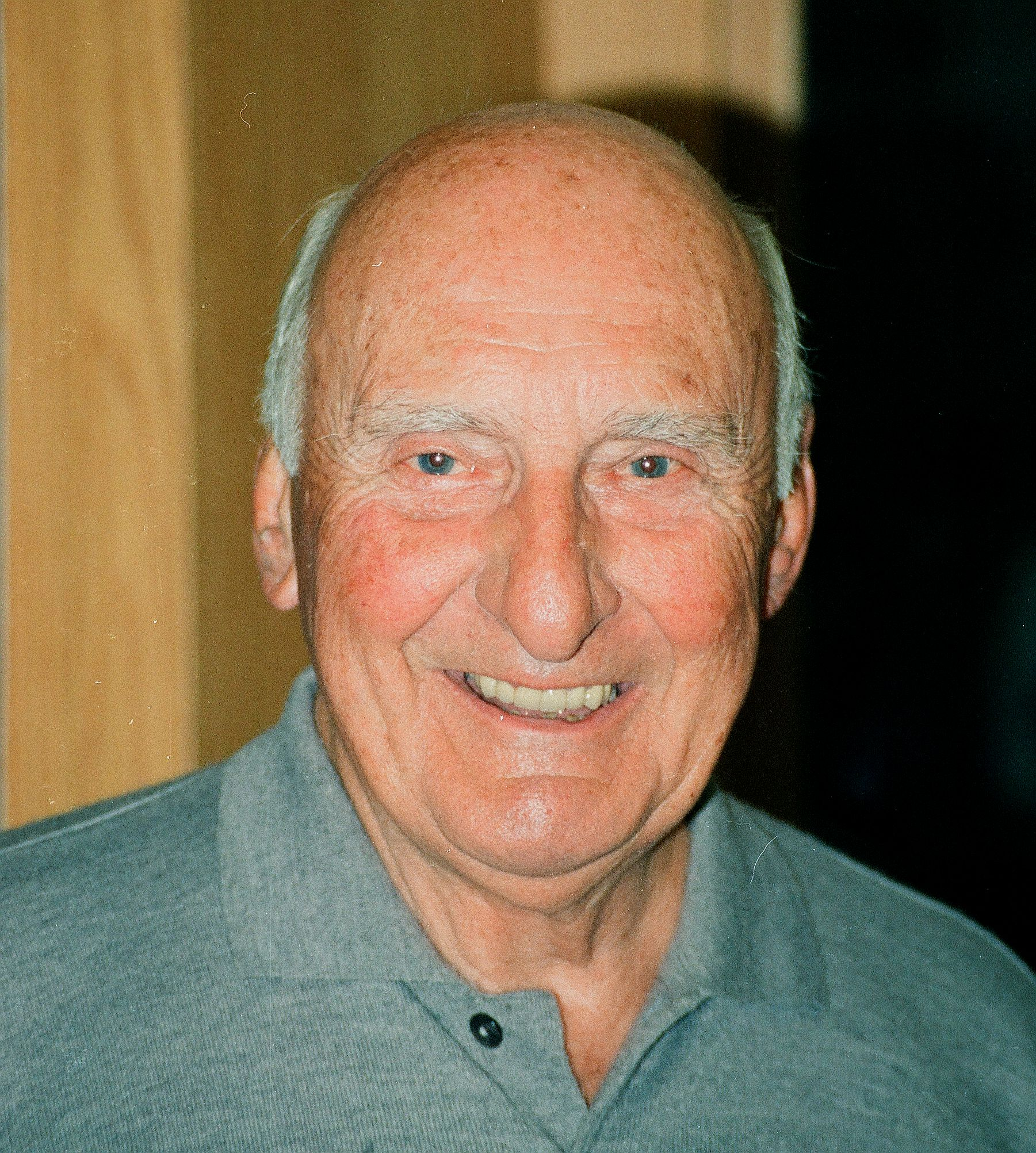
- Thompson in 1996
- Born: Charles Lloyd Thompson; June 10, 1921; Palmer, Massachusetts, U.S.
- Died: March 6, 2005 (aged 83); Towson, Maryland, U.S.
- Sports commentary career
- Team(s): Baltimore Orioles; Baltimore Colts
- Genre: Play-by-play
- Sport(s): Major League Baseball; National Football League

Charles Lloyd Thompson (June 10, 1921 – March 6, 2005) was an American sportscaster best known for his broadcasts of Major League Baseball's Baltimore Orioles and the National Football League (NFL)'s Baltimore Colts. He was well-recognized for his resonant voice, crisply descriptive style of play-by-play, and signature on-air exclamations "Go to war, Miss Agnes!" and "Ain't the beer cold!"

== Biography ==
=== Early life and career ===
Thompson was born in Palmer, Massachusetts, and moved with his family to Reading, Pennsylvania, in 1927. He began his broadcasting career in 1939 at WRAW in Reading, working there until 1942. After spending only a month at WKBN in Youngstown, Ohio, that same year, he joined WIBG in Philadelphia as an on-air announcer. His career was interrupted in October 1943, when he was drafted into the U.S. Army. Promoted to the rank of sergeant, he was sent to Europe aboard the Queen Mary in January 1945 and fought in the Battle of the Bulge. After an honorable discharge in August 1945, he returned to WIBG. For three years starting in 1946, he, along with Byrum Saam and Claude Haring, called all the home games of both Philadelphia professional baseball teams, the Athletics and Phillies. He also called Temple University football during this period.

=== Career in Baltimore ===
In 1949, Thompson was hired by the Gunther Brewing Company to be WITH's play-by-play voice for both the International League Orioles and the Colts, at the time a member of the All-America Football Conference (AAFC). Despite being laid off following the 1951 IL season because the brewery felt no need for a salaried announcer, he joined WITH in order to continue doing the broadcasts.

When the American League's St. Louis Browns moved to Baltimore, Maryland, and were rechristened the Orioles in 1954, his previous connections with Gunther prevented him from becoming a broadcaster for the franchise. The National Brewing Company had purchased the team's broadcast rights and hired Ernie Harwell as the lead voice, but still wanted Thompson to be part of the coverage. He agreed to work with Harwell on Orioles broadcasts on WCBM and WMAR-TV in 1955. Two years later he joined Bob Wolff to call Washington Senators games on WWDC and WTOP-TV, succeeding Arch McDonald as a result of National Brewing's becoming the team's new sponsor.

Thompson returned to broadcast Orioles games on both radio and television (WBAL and WJZ-TV from 1962–1978, WFBR from 1979–1982, and WMAR-TV from 1979–1987). He resigned from the radio broadcasts after the 1982 season and the death of longtime broadcast partner Bill O'Donnell. However, he remained on the television broadcasts until his first retirement after the 1987 season. The prime of his career was the 17 years he shared the broadcast booth with O'Donnell beginning in 1966. During that span, the pair would describe two World Series Championships (1966 and 1970), five American League Pennants (1966, 1969, 1970, 1971, and 1979), six A.L. Eastern Division titles (1969, 1970, 1971, 1973, 1974, and 1979), and only one losing season. Others who worked with Thompson on Orioles broadcasts included Frank Messer (1964–1967), Jim Karvellas (1968–1969), John Gordon (1970–1972), Brooks Robinson (1978–1987), and Tom Marr (1979–1982). Thompson was also the narrator of the official 1966 World Series highlight film jointly produced by both major leagues.

Besides his baseball-related achievements, Thompson also called Colts football for many years, first on CBS television in the 1950s and '60s, and then alongside Vince Bagli on WCBM Radio from 1973 until the team's relocation to Indianapolis in 1984. From 1964 to 1969, he narrated the Colts' season review films produced by NFL Films, making on-camera appearances in the first two. The National Sportscasters and Sportswriters Association named Thompson as Maryland Sportscaster of the Year for eight consecutive years from 1959 to 1966.

=== National work ===
Thompson's national television debut was in 1954 when he succeeded Ray Scott as the voice of the NFL's Saturday night Game of the Week on the DuMont Television Network, as well as that year's NFL Championship Game. Four years later, he teamed with Chris Schenkel to call the telecast of the legendary 1958 Championship Game on NBC. The announcers flipped a coin to determine play-by-play assignments for the two halves. Schenkel won the toss and chose the second half. Thompson ended up broadcasting the first-ever sudden-victory overtime in professional football history. Thompson also called the 1959 and 1964 Championship Games for NBC and CBS, respectively, and regular-season NFL games for the Mutual radio network. In 1988, he was among several veteran announcers who called some September NFL telecasts for NBC while many of the network's regular broadcasters were working that year's Summer Olympics in Seoul, South Korea.

Thompson also did baseball work for NBC, beginning with the Game of the Week in 1959 and 1960. He, along with Curt Gowdy, covered the Memorial Stadium legs of the World Series in 1966, 1970 and 1971, and conducted the victorious post-Series clubhouse interviews in 1966 and 1970.

He is particularly remembered for his flawed but endearing call of Bill Mazeroski's championship-clinching home run to end the 1960 World Series, for which he was the play-by-play announcer for NBC Radio.(Audio) This event was replayed in full on an MLB radio special some years ago, during one of the players' strikes. The pitcher was actually Ralph Terry; Art Ditmar was warming up in the bullpen, and besides that error, Thompson just got caught up in the moment:

Well, a little while ago, when we mentioned that this one, in typical fashion, was going right to the wire, little did we know…Art Ditmar throws—here's a swing and a high fly ball going deep to left, this may do it!…Back to the wall goes Berra, it is…over the fence, home run, the Pirates win!…(long pause for crowd noise)…Ladies and gentlemen, Mazeroski has hit a one-nothing pitch over the left field fence at Forbes Field to win the 1960 World Series for the Pittsburgh Pirates by a score of ten to nothing!…Once again, that final score…The Pittsburgh Pirates, the 1960 world champions, defeat the New York Yankees. The Pirates ten, and the Yankees NINE!... and Forbes Field... is an insane asylum!

In 1985, Thompson's Ditmar-Terry flub became a commercial hit, featured as an audio-over in a nostalgia-immersed Budweiser TV ad during that year's World Series. A libel lawsuit subsequently filed by Ditmar against Anheuser-Busch and its advertising agency for the commercial was ultimately rejected by a United States District Court.

=== Later career ===
Thompson came out of retirement in 1991 to work part-time on Orioles games for WBAL when Jon Miller was away broadcasting ESPN Sunday Night Baseball. Failing eyesight caused by macular degeneration forced him to retire for good in 2000. He received the Ford C. Frick Award from the National Baseball Hall of Fame and Museum in 1993. In January 2009, the American Sportscasters Association ranked Thompson 34th on its list of Top 50 Sportscasters of All Time.

=== Death ===
Thompson, who lived in Lutherville, Maryland, at the time, died at Greater Baltimore Medical Center on March 6, 2005, after suffering a stroke.

== Catch phrase origins ==
"Go to war, Miss Agnes!" was picked up from a golfing friend who never swore and whose putting failed to improve even after reading a book about it. Thompson explained the details in Curt Smith's Voices of the Game:

He was a great guy, very proper, and like any golfer, he had some real frustrations. But instead of cussing, he'd come up with the phrase, 'Go to war, Miss Agnes!' I didn't know what it meant, but don't feel bad – he may not have known. What I did know was that it sounded so funny. I picked it up and used it to emphasize something big and exciting on the ball field, and it just caught on – with listeners, it snowballed.

Thompson phased out the expression when the Vietnam War was protracted, although it was later picked up by North Carolina Tar Heels football and basketball broadcaster Woody Durham.

"Ain't the beer cold!" became the title of Thompson's autobiography, in which he described the story behind the exclamation:

For years in my game broadcasts I had used the expression, 'Ain't the beer cold!' when things were going especially well for the home team. I got that phrase from Bob Robertson, a spotter who worked with me on Baltimore Colts football games (that were sponsored by the makers of National Beer). Eventually, I received lots of mail from people in the Carolinas, the area sometimes referred to as the Bible Belt. The listeners felt they shouldn't have to put up with my ad libs about beer with all the beer advertisements they were already exposed to, and I thought they had a legitimate beef. So, I stopped using the line sometime in the 1970s.

== Bibliography ==
- Smith, Curt. Voices of The Game. 2nd edition. New York: Simon & Schuster, 1992.
- Bready, James H. The Home Team. 4th edition. Baltimore: 1984.
