= National Bohemian =

Brand of beer from Baltimore, United States

National Bohemian Beer
- "Oh boy. What a beer!"
- Manufacturer: Pabst Brewing Company
- Introduced: 1885; 141 years ago
- Alcohol by volume: 4.28%
- Style: Lager
- Website: nationalbohemian.com

National Bohemian Beer, colloquially known as Natty Boh, is an American lager originating from Baltimore, Maryland. It was first brewed in 1885 by the National Brewing Company, but was eventually purchased by Pabst Brewing Company.

Nearly 90 percent of National Bohemian sales are in Baltimore. The beer is currently brewed under contract at the Molson Coors brewing facilities in Albany, Georgia and Trenton, Ohio.

== History ==
For a time, National's president Jerold Hoffberger also owned the Baltimore Orioles; Natty Boh was served at Memorial Stadium and became the "official" beer of Baltimore in the late 1960s. The "Land of Pleasant Living" slogan reached its peak during the mid-late 1960s when National acquired a Chesapeake Bay skipjack (local sailing vessel) and named it the "Chesterpeake" after a pelican who appeared in their ads. The Chesterpeake traveled throughout the Maryland portion of the Chesapeake Bay visiting various local festivals, regattas, yacht clubs, etc. and was also seen in television commercials.

After a 1975 merger with Canadian brewer Carling, the Baltimore brewery located at the intersection of O'Donnell and Conkling streets was closed in 1978 and production moved to the company's more modern brewery in nearby Halethorpe. Carling-National was purchased by the G. Heileman Brewing Company in 1979. Heileman added Tuborg to the list of beers brewed in Halethorpe.

In July 1996, G. Heileman was sold to the Stroh Brewery Company. In October 1996 Stroh announced that it would close the Halethorpe brewery in two months and shift production to its other facilities. The Halethorpe brewery made its last can of Natty Boh on November 11, 1996. Over 400 workers lost their jobs when the Halethorpe plant closed. The Halethorpe plant was sold to a local interest. The Halethorpe brewing facility was demolished by 2006, while the original Baltimore brewing facility was redeveloped as the Brewers Hill complex by Obrecht Commercial Real Estate, Inc.

In 2000 Stroh Brewery Company went out of business and most of its brands, including National Bohemian, were sold to the Pabst Brewing Company. Pabst has brewed Natty Boh since that time.

Apparently Pabst changed National Bohemian's recipe for a time because by 2009 its website was announcing that "Today, Natty Boh has returned to the traditional recipe that made it the beer of choice in Baltimore and across the mid-Atlantic."

For over 15 years, the famous Baltimore beer was not available on draft, only bottles and cans, but in February 2011, local taverns in the Baltimore area celebrated the ability to serve National Bohemian from a keg. National Bohemian draft also became available at Oriole Park at Camden Yards for the home season opener in 2011.

== Marketing ==
The company's mascot, the one-eyed, handlebar-mustachioed Mr. Boh, has been a recognizable icon since his introduction in 1936 by company president Arthur Deute. In an era when National Boh's main competition was another local brew Gunther Beer, whose slogan was "Gunther's got it". A popular joke asked "What happened to Mr. Boh's other eye?" to which the answer was given: "Gunther's got it."

According to Dawson Farber, who was promoted to vice-president of marketing in 1950, he has "no idea why he only has one eye." Farber confesses. "I don't think anybody does." It is hinted that it could be so because Mr. Boh's head is supposed to be viewed from the side. The image was debuted in 1936, and through Farber's modern redesign it became a "potent brewery icon". By the end of National's 1960s to mid-1970s run as one of Baltimore's most prominent corporate “citizens,” Mr. Boh's image largely gave way to the “National Bohemian” name itself against a rectangular background which dipped in the middle to form a “V.” Indeed, some of Boh's popularity began to wane in 1967 when the brewer temporarily shifted its advertising slogan from “The Land of Pleasant Living” to “Every Man Should Have a Beer He Can Call His Own.”

The mascot's image is licensed for a Maryland Lottery scratch off; by Smyth Jewelers; and was the official team mascot of the Baltimore Bohemians professional soccer team. A Mr. Boh neon sign currently sits atop the former site of the National Brewery building in the Brewer's Hill neighborhood of Baltimore and is clearly visible from I-95 just north of the Fort McHenry Tunnel. Mr. Boh still appears on all cans, bottles, and packaging; and merchandise featuring him can still easily be found in shops in Maryland, including several in Fells Point. The National line also included "National Bohemian Dark" and "National Premium", available in can, bottle, and draft versions. Both brands were discontinued following G. Heileman's sale to Stroh's in 1996; however, National Premium rights were purchased and the recipe re-bottled and distributed starting in 2012 by a couple located on the Eastern Shore of Maryland. National Bohemian also produces an ice beer called "Boh Ice" having an alcohol content of 5.8%.

Mr. Boh has become an icon to the city of Baltimore. Entire stores are dedicated to products to featuring the character in Fells Point, Canton, and other locations. The citizens of Baltimore have fought to make Mr. Boh an unofficial spokesman for the city.

== Caps Puzzles ==
National Bohemian added Cap Puzzles, a series of pictograms, or rebus that create a common phrase, in 1944. The bottles with Cap Puzzles were used by United States spies to aid the allies in World War II. After the conclusion of the war Cap Puzzles remained and are now a staple of the product.

== Community support and sponsorship ==
From the 1950s through the demise of the National Brewing Company in 1978, the brewery was involved in many athletic sponsorships. Early involvements included bowling and golf tournaments held in the Baltimore metro area. During the 1950s and 1960s, National Beer sponsored the PGA Eastern Open Invitational held at the Mt Pleasant Golf Course in Baltimore. Beginning in the late 1960s, National Beer began sponsoring the National Beer Brewers softball team, composed primarily of Baltimore Clippers hockey players. From 1968 to 1985, the brewery sponsored the National Brewers ice hockey team in the Chesapeake Hockey League. Though the brand lost a great deal of local market share in the 1970s, 1980s, and 1990s (due mainly to the overwhelming media blitz of Anheuser-Busch) there has been a resurgence of interest in "Natty Boh" in recent years, particularly among younger beer drinkers.
