= Bill O'Donnell (sportscaster) =

American sportscaster

- Born: William T. O'Donnell Jr. June 4, 1926; Manhattan, New York City, U.S.
- Died: October 29, 1982 (aged 56); Baltimore, Maryland, U.S.
- Sports commentary career
- Team: Baltimore Orioles (1966–82)
- Genre: Play-by-play
- Sport: Major League Baseball

William T. O'Donnell Jr. (June 4, 1926 – October 29, 1982) was an American sportscaster.

== Life and career ==
Born in Manhattan and raised in The Bronx, O'Donnell attended Fordham Preparatory School and Fordham University. After serving in the Marines during World War II, he completed his education at Mohawk Valley Community College, then began his sportscasting career in Syracuse, calling Syracuse Chiefs minor-league baseball and Syracuse University football and basketball. He also worked as the nightly sportscaster for WSYR for many years. He was married to Mary Patricia O’Donnell and had five children: Kevin O’Donnell(sp:Jean, Erin(Velez), Kerrie), Kathleen Walther(sp:Joe, Caitlin), Colleen Flury(sp:Stevan, Michael, Shannon(Neidhardt)), Maureen Kane(sp:Tom, Ethan, Jimmy) and Eileen O’Donnell.

The Baltimore Orioles hired O'Donnell in 1966, and he paired with Chuck Thompson to call their games on WJZ-TV (1966–1977), WBAL-AM (1966–1978), and WFBR-AM with fellow broadcaster Tom Marr from 1979 until health reasons forced him to step down early in the 1982 season. O'Donnell also contributed to national coverage of the team's appearances in the 1969 World Series on NBC Television and the 1971 World Series on NBC Radio.

In addition to the Orioles, O'Donnell called Baltimore Colts radio from 1966 to 1968, as well as college football for ABC, regional MLB and NFL games for NBC, and college basketball for TVS Television Network.

O'Donnell died at age 56 of cancer at Johns Hopkins Hospital on October 29, 1982. He was posthumously given the Herb Armstrong Award by the Baltimore Orioles Hall of Fame in 2007.
