= Joe Croghan =

American sportscaster (1921–1995)

- Born: Joseph Benedict Michael Croghan; October 1, 1921; Baltimore, Maryland, U.S.
- Died: November 27, 1995 (aged 74); Towson, Maryland, U.S.
- Sports commentary career
- Teams: Baltimore Colts (1957–1965, 1969); Baltimore Orioles (1960–1961, 1963); Miami Dolphins (1970)
- Sports: National Football League; Major League Baseball; College football

Joseph Benedict Michael Croghan (October 1, 1921 – November 27, 1995) was an American sportscaster who was a play-by-play announcer for the Baltimore Orioles, Baltimore Colts, and Miami Dolphins.

== Early life ==
Croghan was born and raised in Baltimore. He graduated from Loyola High School in 1939 and Loyola College in 1943. He was captain of the Loyola Greyhounds track and field team in 1942. He served in the United States Armed Forces during World War II and first became interested in broadcasting after making announcements on his troop ship's public address system during his voyage home.

== Career ==
Croghan got his start in broadcasting in 1947 at WANN in Annapolis, Maryland, where served as a play-by-play announcer for Navy Midshipmen football games. In 1949, he joined WBAL radio and WBAL-TV. He hosted Kitchen Karnival on the radio and was a cast member on Bob Berry's Luck 'Leven Ranch on television. In 1955, he became WBAL-TV's sports director. He joined the Baltimore Colts radio broadcast team in 1957, calling games alongside Bob Wolff. He called the 1958 NFL Championship Game, which was the Colts' first NFL Championship and the first NFL game to be decided in sudden death overtime. In 1963, he began broadcasting Baltimore Orioles games on radio and television with Chuck Thompson.

Croghan left WBAL in November 1964 and joined WRC-TV that December. In 1966, he became a sports anchor at WCKT in Miami. In 1967, he called the Miami Dolphins-Buffalo Bills game for NBC. It was the first time the network hired a local announcer to call an American Football League game. In 1969, he returned to Baltimore to call Colts games. This lasted one season, as he returned to Miami to become the Dolphins' radio play-by-play announcer and sports director of WIOD. In 1971, he became the sports director at WPLG. That same year, began calling Miami Hurricanes football games on WGBS. He was replaced on the Dolphins broadcast team by Rick Weaver.

Croghan left WPLG in 1975 because he felt he was understaffed. He joined radio station WGMA in Hollywood, Florida later that year. In 1980, he was named sports director of WGBS.

== Later life ==
In 1984, Croghan was let go by WGBS as a cost-cutting measure. He retired and moved to Towson, Maryland the following year. He died from cancer at a Towson nursing home on November 27, 1995.
