= National Brewing Company =

- U.S. National Register of Historic Places
- U.S. Historic district – Contributing property
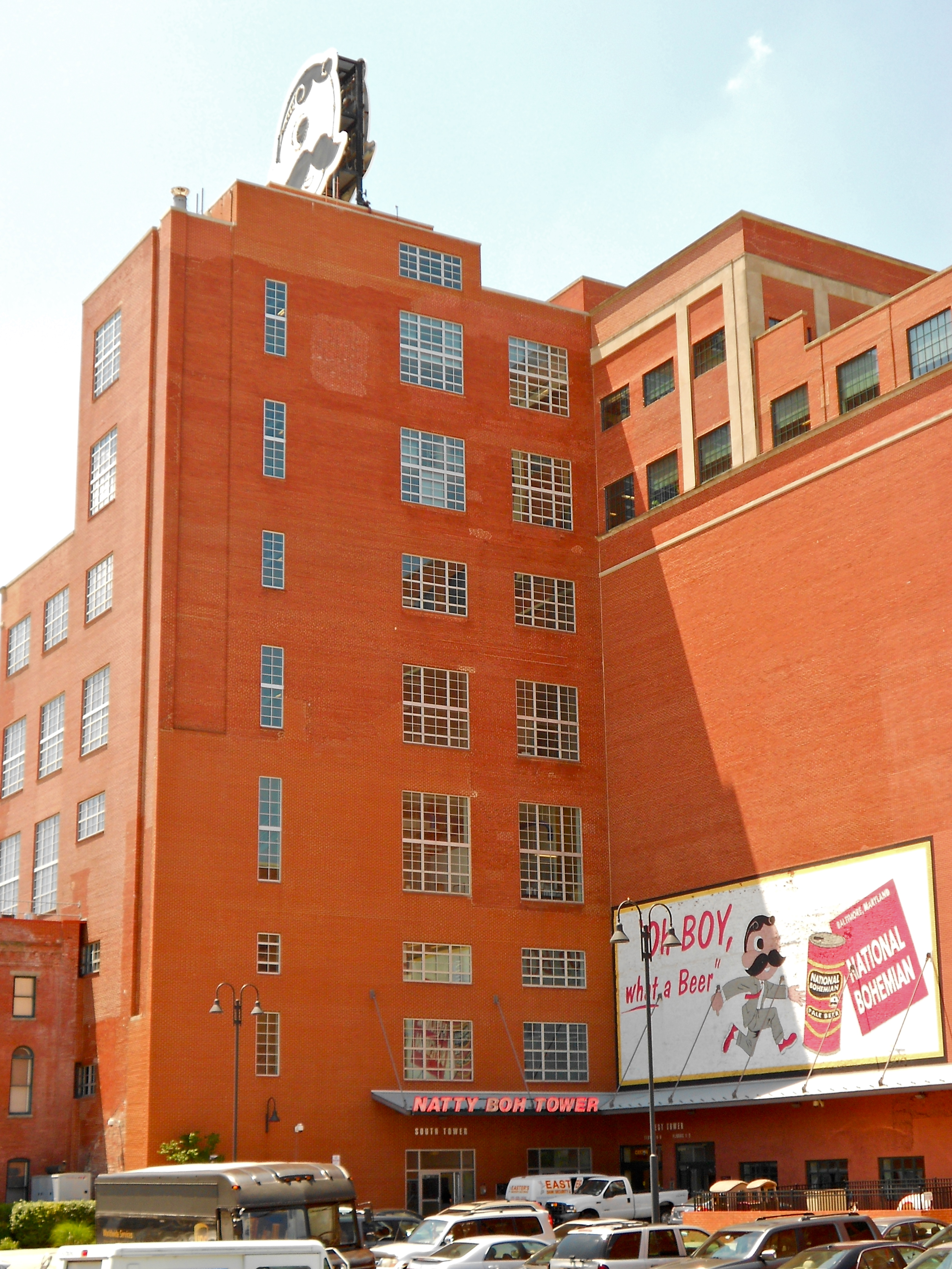
- National Brewing Company building, May 2012

- Location within Baltimore Location within Maryland Location within the United States
- Location: 3601-3901 Dillon St., Baltimore, Maryland
- Coordinates: 39°16′51″N 76°33′53″W
- Area: 8.5 acres (3.4 ha)
- Built: 1885-1966
- Architect: Wolf, Otto; Backhus, Paul W.
- Architectural style: Romanesque, Moderne
- NRHP reference No.: 02001579
- Added to NRHP: December 30, 2002

The National Brewing Company was an American brewing company that was founded in Baltimore, Maryland, in 1885. Its Baltimore brewery was located in the city's Highlandtown neighborhood. After World War II, it grew to be the largest brewer in Baltimore history and its advertising, including one-eyed mascot "Mr. Boh" and its slogan "From the Land of Pleasant Living", became part of the folk culture of the Baltimore area.

In 1975, the National Brewing Company was acquired by the Carling Brewing Company. National's Highlandtown brewery was operated until 1978, when it was closed and production moved to a brewery in nearby Halethorpe, Baltimore County that had been built by Carling in 1961. The National Brewing Company brands continued to be brewed at the Halethorpe plant until it closed in 1996. Since 2000, the company’s two most prominent brands, National Bohemian Beer and Colt 45, have been brewed for Pabst Brewing Company at several plants.

== History ==
=== Early history ===
The National Brewing Company plant was located between Dillon, Conkling and O'Donnell Streets in the Baltimore's Highlandtown neighborhood. The site was first used in beer production in the 1850s, when brewer John Baier rented land at O'Donnell and Conklin Streets into which beer storage cellars were dug. After Baier's death in 1866, his widow Anna Maria Baier continued to operate his brewery, which was located on Canton Avenue. Anna later married Frederick Wunder and by 1872 they had built a brewery, known as Wunder's Brewery, on the National Brewing site.

In 1885, the Wunder Brewery was sold at foreclosure sale to members of the Straus family, who later incorporated the business as the National Brewing Company. In 1885, National Brewing Company began brewing their flagship National Bohemian beer by the barrel. Nevertheless, they were still considered one of the city's smaller breweries. In 1899 National was one of sixteen breweries that joined to form the Maryland Brewing Company, with the then massive combined annual production capacity of 1,500,000 barrels. In 1901 eight of the sixteen plants were closed and the surviving breweries, including National, reorganized to form the Gottlieb-Bauernschmidt-Straus Brewing Co. The G-B-S Brewing Company operated the National plant until 1919, but after the start of Prohibition it was foreclosed on and sold in 1920 to Abraham Krieger, who would later be the president of the Gunther Brewing Company.

=== Post-Prohibition ===
In the early 1930s Samuel H. Hoffberger, in anticipation that Prohibition would be repealed, began the process of acquiring the National Brewery. Hoffberger, a lawyer with numerous business and civic interests, revived the National Brewing Company and modernized its brewery. The company hired brewmaster Carl Kreitler and president Arthur Deute in the 1930s. While Kreiter was credited with perfecting the recipes for National Bohemian and National Premium beers, Deute was a marketing genius who, with the help of a Gay Street printer named Webb, created the Mr. Boh mascot around 1936. The one-eyed Mr. Boh, with his handlebar mustache, would be featured prominently in National Bohemian advertising for many years.

=== Market expansion ===
When Samuel Hoffberger's son, Jerold Hoffberger, returned from World War II in 1945, he was made treasurer of the company at age 26. In 1947, after the death of Arthur Deute, Jerold was named President of the National Brewing Company, a position he would hold for 28 years. Under Jerold Hoffberger's leadership, National undertook an aggressive expansion program.

National Bohemian gained increased prominence in 1954 after Jerold Hoffberger played a key role in the successful effort to move the St. Louis Browns to Baltimore where they became the Baltimore Orioles. “Natty Boh” was sold at Memorial Stadium and would ultimately become the official sponsor of the Baltimore Orioles.

In 1954 the company expanded outside Maryland by buying a controlling interest in the Altes Brewing Co. of Detroit. By that time, National was brewing 1,000,000 barrels annually at its Baltimore plant - an increase from 300,000 barrels just seven years earlier - while the Altes acquisition added another 800,000 barrels of capacity.

Two years later, in 1956, National Brewing purchased the Marlin Brewing Co. of Orlando Florida, which added another 120,000 barrels in annual production capacity.

In October 1958 the company launched a new advertising campaign praising the Chesapeake Bay region and describing National Bohemian beer as being “From the Land of Pleasant Living.” The slogan became part of the folk culture of Maryland and the unofficial motto of the state. In 1959 Maryland's House of Delegates and Senate adopted resolutions commending the National Brewing Company "for their outstanding work in publicizing and extolling the virtues of Maryland and the Chesapeake Bay". The theme was later incorporated into the company's jingle, which boasted that National beer was proudly “brewed on the shores of the Chesapeake Bay.” Land of Pleasant Living themed advertising was used by the company until 1970, when it was retired because it was thought to be wearing thin.

In 1960, National produced 1,354,000 barrels.

The company acquired the Miami, Florida Regal brewery plant and its brands in June 1961. The Miami brewery had a capacity of between 400,000 and 500,000 barrels annually. National continued to brew Regal beer in Miami. The smaller Orlando plant was closed later that year.

National's last brewery acquisition occurred in 1966 when it purchased the Phoenix, Arizona plant of Carling Brewing Co. Until 1964 the Phoenix brewery had been owned by the Arizona Brewing Co., and National's acquisition included the A-1 beer label, which had been an Arizona Brewing brand. The Phoenix plant had a capacity of 350,000 barrels a year and brought National's total capacity to 2,600,000 barrels.

=== Contraction, Merger and Sale ===
By the early 1970s, the National Brewing Company, facing intense competition and high prices, struggled to continue operating as an independent entity.

National's Detroit brewery closed in early 1974, and its Miami plant was shut down in early 1975, leaving only the Baltimore and Phoenix plants in operation.

In 1974 the company produced 2.2 million barrels.

In 1975, National Brewing was acquired by Carling Brewing Company in what was described at the time as a merger. Although the Hoffbergers managed to sell their beer holdings for more than $16 million, Jerold Hoffberger stayed on as head of Carling-National Breweries. At the time, National had two breweries and Carling had seven, including a large plant in Halethorpe, Baltimore County that was built in 1961; together they had the capacity to brew 7 million barrels a year, making it the 9th largest brewery in the country. Nevertheless, as Carling-National experienced a sharp decline in sales their first year, a merger with Pabst Brewing Company was subsequently proposed. The court, however, arguing that the fusion of the two companies would result in a monopoly, denied the merger. Merely three years later, Carling-National was sold to G. Heileman Brewing Company of La Crosse, Wisconsin and the former brewing facility of Brewer's Hill was closed. Stroh Brewery Company of Detroit, Michigan later bought over the rights from Heileman in 1996. National Bohemian beer has not been brewed in Baltimore since.

=== 21st century ===
In the early 2000s the old Baltimore National Brewing plant was converted to business and office spaces as a part of the Brewers Hill redevelopment project by Obrecht Commercial Real Estate.

The National Brewing Company complex was listed on the National Register of Historic Places in 2002. It is located in the Brewers Hill Historic District.

== National Brewing Company Brands ==
Pre-Prohibition beers produced by the National Brewing Company included Bohemian.

Within several years of the repeal of Prohibition in 1933, the company produced a lager, ale and seasonal bock. By the end of the 1930s, however, the company's flagship brand was National Bohemian while National Premium was also widely distributed. Post-Prohibition brands produced by National included:

=== National Bohemian ===
After Pabst's acquisition of National Bohemian, the beer was brewed in North Carolina by Miller Brewing, under a contract agreement.

=== National Premium ===
In late 2011, it was announced that the National Premium label would be revived under the ownership of an Easton, Maryland, based entrepreneur. Using the same recipe as the original, National Premium Beer is now brewed under contract for The National Brewing Company by Heavy Seas Brewery in Halethorpe. The National Premium brand is independent and has no relationship with the present-day National Bohemian, which is owned by Pabst.

=== Colt 45 Malt Liquor ===
In 1963, National Brewing Company started brewing Colt 45 (which was rumored to be named after 1963 Colts running back #45 Jerry Hill although Hill had no personal knowledge that it was). Prior to its advent, the only major national brand of malt liquor was Country Club. To emblemize its "extra kick" compared with competing brands, Colt 45 was accordingly labeled with a kicking horse and horse shoe.

=== Malt Duck ===
A new product, Malt Duck was added around 1976. It came in 2 flavors, grape and apple, and utilized the Colt 45 malt liquor base with added flavors and sugar.

=== Altes ===
Altes Brewing Company was a local Detroit, Michigan brewery which National acquired in 1954. Altes Beer was a popular lower priced beer in Michigan but National decided to discontinue Altes and replace it by brewing and selling National Bohemian Beer in Detroit. The move did not work and Altes Beer was brought back. A new company called Altes Detroit Brewing Company now has rights to the brand and recipe and is attempting a comeback in Southeastern Michigan.
