= Jim Karvellas =

American sportscaster (1935–2007)

Jim Karvellas (August 24, 1935–January 1, 2007) was a veteran play-by-play sportscaster whose career on radio and television spanned more than 30 years. Known for his trademark calls of "Bulls-eye!" for big baskets and "This is Coz-MOES SOCK-errr!," Karvellas was the voice of the NBA's Baltimore/Washington Bullets and New York Knicks as well as the NASL's New York Cosmos. "There was always an undercurrent of enthusiasm when he was on the air because he loved the game. And he had that deep resonant voice. You can be a great technician but you have to have that voice," said Frank Deford of Sports Illustrated and NPR.

After his broadcast career, Karvellas co-founded the Celebrity Golf Association (CGA). In 1990, he partnered with NBC to host the first of many Celebrity Golf Championships. Many consider him a "founding father" of celebrity golf.

== Early history ==
A native of Chicago, Jim Karvellas was born Demetrie C. Karvellas to first-generation Greek Americans Christ and Anthy Karvellas. He grew up among a close-knit extended family residing in the Hyde Park neighborhood of Chicago near his father's grocery store. Jim was the oldest of three children, including a sister Becky (Theon) and brother Peter.

At an early age, Karvellas practiced what would evolve into his signature play-by-play style. He spent a lot of time playing All Star Baseball, a common board game he would use to create an imaginary game. "When we were 14 or 15, we played what we called 'Spinner Baseball,' and Jim always did the commentary after we'd spun the dial," said a cousin, Larry Poullman of Chicago." Karvellas spent his high school years at St. John's Military Academy in Delafield, WI and later attended Northwestern University.

== Sportscasting career ==
Karvellas' radio and TV broadcasting career spanned basketball, soccer, football, baseball, golf, and even NASCAR. In 2002, Karvellas reflected on the diversity of his career in the St. Petersburg Times: "As a sports announcer, you may be better at one or the other depending on your style. But doing all those sports made me more professional." He continued: "You learn how to open and close events, fill time during delays in auto races, so those were all really important in helping mold me as an announcer."

=== NBA ===
==== Bullets ====
- Chicago Packers (1961–1962)
- Chicago Zephyrs (1962–1963)
- Baltimore Bullets (1963–1973)
- Capital Bullets (1973–1974)
- Washington Bullets (1974–1980) (1992–1993)

Karvellas began his career in 1962 as the voice of the Chicago Packers (1961–1962). The team was soon renamed the Chicago Zephyrs (1962–1962). In 1963, he moved with the Zephyrs to Baltimore where it became the Baltimore Bullets, taking the name from an earlier team. In his own words, quoted from The Baltimore Sun in 1988: "It was my first really big league job, It was exciting for me being with a major league team. Although the NBA wasn't as big league then, it was big enough for me." At the time, he was the youngest NBA announcer. In 1992, he returned to the then Washington Bullets.

==== NY Knicks (1980–1992) ====
For twelve years, New York fans came to know Karvellas as the voice of the New York Knicks. He began in 1980 on the MSG TV side, working for the first six seasons on home games with Cal Ramsey (two seasons) and Butch Beard (four seasons). He next moved to radio where he worked with Ernie Grunfeld (two seasons) and Walt (Clyde) Frazier (three seasons). He covered NBA games for CBS radio (1978–1986) and was host of the USA Network's NBA Game of the Week (1979–1981.)

=== NFL & MLB ===
- Colts (1968–1969)
- Orioles (1968–1969)

Beginning in 1968, Karvellas began calling other Baltimore games. He did play-by-play for the Colts and became the third member of the Orioles' broadcast team that included Chuck Thompson and Bill O'Donnell. A year later, he called both the 1969 Super Bowl and World Series on national radio when both teams made appearances.

=== North American Soccer League (NASL) ===
In the 1970s, Karvellas was involved with early efforts to bring the international game of soccer to American audiences.

==== Baltimore Bays (1972–1973) ====
As president of the Baltimore Bays, Karvellas worked to bring soccer back to the city. The Bays ultimately moved to Philadelphia without Karvellas, who had left for Washington, DC.

==== Washington Diplomats (1974–1975) ====
While a sportscaster on WTTG (Channel 5), Karvellas played a leading role in the third attempt to bring soccer to Washington, DC.

He became president and part-owner of the Washington Diplomats and brought with him Baltimore Bays coach Dennis Viollet. Reported The New York Times, "The Washington Diplomats are working hard to establish themselves, both in the North American Soccer League, which they will join this season, and with the people of the capital." With the loss of the Washington Senators baseball team, Karvellas also saw an opportunity. For a period of time the Diplomats were the only professional sports team in the area and there was growing interest in soccer in the suburbs. He said to the Times, "We have 22,000 kids play soccer in this area and we have a responsibility, to them and to their parents. We are trying to make the Diplomats a first‐class operation."

==== New York Cosmos: "This is Cosmos Soccer" (1976–1980) ====
In 1976, Karvellas became the voice of the New York Cosmos, teaming up with Howard David on TV and radio, and Seamus Malin on TV. "Jim was the perfect man for those days. He had a lot of flair; he was a reflection of the team" said Cosmo's Giorgio Chinagila to the New York Post. Karvellas' intonation "This is Cosmos Soccer" became a catchphrase and the name of an album featuring highlights from the team's 1977 season.

== Celebrity Golf Association and Championship ==
The Celebrity Golf Championship (now known as American Century Championship) was the brain child of Jim Karvellas. He was quoted saying: "As a golfer myself, I wanted to see the celebrities tee it up and post their own score when it really counted." It took Karvellas years to make Celebrity Golf a reality but it was finally picked up by NBC due to their loss of Major League Baseball. The first tournament was held at Edgewood Tahoe Golf Course in 1990. It hosted players such as Michael Jordan, Ernie Banks, Mario Lemieux, Mike Schmidt, and Kenny Rogers to name a few.

== Personal life ==
Karvellas was married to the former Lorie Hirst for 38 years until her death in 1997. They had two children and five grandchildren.
