= List of Major League Baseball Game of the Week broadcasters =

The Major League Baseball Game of the Week is the de facto title for nationally televised coverage of regular season Major League Baseball games. The Game of the Week has traditionally aired on Saturday afternoons. When the national networks began televising national games of the week, it opened the door for a national audience to see particular clubs. While most teams were broadcast, emphasis was always on the league leaders and the major market franchises that could draw the largest audience.

== Television ==
=== 2020s ===
Year	Network(s)	Play-by-play	Color commentary
2026	Fox	Joe Davis; Adam Amin; Kenny Albert; Kevin Kugler; Jeff Levering; Don Orsillo; Connor Onion; Eric Collins; Brandon Gaudin	John Smoltz; A. J. Pierzynski; Adam Wainwright; Eric Karros; Tom Verducci; Mark Sweeney; Dontrelle Willis
2025	Fox	Joe Davis; Adam Amin; Jason Benetti; Kenny Albert; Alex Faust; Connor Onion; Eric Collins; Brandon Gaudin; Don Orsillo; Jeff Levering; Cory Provus; Wayne Randazzo; Aaron Goldsmith	John Smoltz; A. J. Pierzynski; Adam Wainwright; Eric Karros; Tom Verducci
2024	Fox	Joe Davis; Adam Amin; Jason Benetti; Kevin Kugler; Kenny Albert; Aaron Goldsmith; Alex Faust; Brandon Gaudin; Don Orsillo; Cory Provus; Wayne Randazzo	John Smoltz; Adam Wainwright; Tom Verducci; A. J. Pierzynski; Eric Karros; Dontrelle Willis; Mark Sweeney; Dontrelle Willis
2023	Fox	Joe Davis; Adam Amin; Jason Benetti; Kevin Kugler; Len Kasper; Don Orsillo	John Smoltz; A. J. Pierzynski; Eric Karros; Tom Verducci
2022	Fox	Adam Amin; Kevin Burkhardt; Joe Davis; Aaron Goldsmith; Len Kasper	John Smoltz; A. J. Pierzynski; Eric Karros
2021	Fox	Joe Buck; Adam Amin; Kevin Burkhardt; Joe Davis; Aaron Goldsmith; Len Kasper	John Smoltz; A. J. Pierzynski; Eric Karros
2020	Fox	Joe Buck; Joe Davis; Adam Amin; Aaron Goldsmith; Kevin Burkhardt	John Smoltz; A. J. Pierzynski; Eric Karros

=== 2010s ===
Year	Network(s)	Play-by-play	Color commentary
2019	Fox	Joe Buck; Joe Davis; Aaron Goldsmith; Kenny Albert; Justin Kutcher; Len Kasper; Jeff Levering	John Smoltz; A. J. Pierzynski; Eric Karros; Joe Girardi; Tom Verducci
2018	Fox	Joe Buck; Kenny Albert; Aaron Goldsmith; Joe Davis; Justin Kutcher; Don Orsillo; Len Kasper; Kevin Burkhardt	John Smoltz; A. J. Pierzynski; Eric Karros; Tom Verducci; C. J. Nitkowski; David Cone
2017	Fox	Joe Buck; Kenny Albert; Matt Vasgersian; Aaron Goldsmith; Joe Davis; Justin Kutcher; Don Orsillo	John Smoltz; A. J. Pierzynski; Tom Verducci; Alex Rodriguez; Bill Ripken; Preston Wilson; David Cone
2016	Fox	Joe Buck; Kenny Albert; Matt Vasgersian; Aaron Goldsmith; Joe Davis; Justin Kutcher; Steve Physioc; Len Kasper; Kevin Burkhardt	John Smoltz; Harold Reynolds and Tom Verducci; C. J. Nitkowski; Eric Karros; Cliff Floyd
2015	Fox	Joe Buck; Kenny Albert; Matt Vasgersian; Aaron Goldsmith; Joe Davis; Len Kasper; Gary Thorne	Harold Reynolds and Tom Verducci; Eric Karros; John Smoltz; C. J. Nitkowski; Bob Brenly; Bert Blyleven; Preston Wilson
2014	Fox	Joe Buck; Kenny Albert; Thom Brennaman; Matt Vasgersian; Justin Kutcher; Gary Thorne; Tom McCarthy; Len Kasper	Harold Reynolds and Tom Verducci; Eric Karros; John Smoltz; F. P. Santangelo; C. J. Nitkowski; Cliff Floyd; Brian Anderson; Billy Ripken; Gabe Kapler; Mark DeRosa
2013	Fox	Joe Buck; Kenny Albert; Thom Brennaman; Matt Vasgersian; Justin Kutcher; Dick Stockton; Rich Waltz; Daron Sutton; Howard David; Tom McCarthy; Dick Bremer; Kevin Burkhardt; Dewayne Staats; Gary Thorne	Tim McCarver; Eric Karros; Tom Verducci; Mitch Williams; Bob Brenly; Bert Blyleven; Billy Ripken; Brian Anderson; Sean Casey; F. P. Santangelo; José Mota; Rod Allen; Rex Hudler
2012	Fox	Joe Buck; Kenny Albert; Thom Brennaman; Matt Vasgersian; Dick Stockton; Daron Sutton; Dick Bremer; Dave Sims; Dave Flemming; Steve Physioc; Chris Myers; Mario Impemba; Tom McCarthy; Drew Goodman; Kevin Burkhardt; Bob Carpenter; Eric Collins; Victor Rojas	Tim McCarver; Eric Karros; Tom Verducci; Mitch Williams; Mark Gubicza; Bert Blyleven; Eric Byrnes; Billy Ripken; Brian Anderson; Bill Schroeder; Rick Manning; Rex Hudler; Mark Grant
2011	Fox	Joe Buck; Kenny Albert; Matt Vasgersian; Josh Lewin; Dick Stockton; Thom Brennaman; Dan McLaughlin; Mario Impemba; Daron Sutton; José Mota; Ryan Lefebvre; Glen Kuiper	Tim McCarver; Eric Karros; Mark Grace; Tom Grieve; Bert Blyleven; Mitch Williams; José Mota; Rod Allen; George Frazier; Sean Casey; Bob Walk
2010	Fox	Joe Buck; Kenny Albert; Josh Lewin; Dick Stockton; Chris Rose; Tom McCarthy; Thom Brennaman	Tim McCarver; Eric Karros; Eric Karros; Kevin Millar; José Mota; Bert Blyleven; Kevin Kennedy; Rod Allen; Tom Grieve

==== Notes ====
- Beginning in 2010, several of the Saturday games aired in prime time during the spring. These telecasts used an exclusivity window from 7 to 10:30 p.m. Eastern Time, as the network revived a pregame show for these games, airing at 7 p.m. with the game at 7:15.
- In 2012, the pregame show returned full-time, prompting another change in scheduling. The normal scheduling in 2012 and 2013 was for the pregame airing at either 12:30 or 3:30 p.m. Eastern Time. The pregame is not a part of Fox's exclusive window, which began with the game telecast starting a half-hour later. The scheduling did not change for the spring prime time games, however, as the scheduling for these games remained the same as in 2010 and 2011.
  - On July 24, 2012, Matt Yoder of Awful Announcing questioned Fox's need to hire local broadcasters on their national telecasts and therefore, bringing about a perceived sense of favoritism towards one of the participating teams. For example, Billy Ripken, who played for the Baltimore Orioles alongside his Hall of Fame brother Cal, was roundly criticized for his perceived favoritism towards the Orioles while broadcasting an Orioles–Detroit Tigers game (even by actor Jeff Daniels via Twitter) for Fox the previous week. The following week came a Philadelphia Phillies–San Francisco Giants telecast on Fox, which was called by Phillies play-by-play announcer Tom McCarthy and former Phillies pitcher Mitch Williams. McCarthy and Williams were in particular, singled out for their rather downbeat manner of calling a Matt Cain home run off Cole Hamels in the top of the 3rd inning. This was contrasted by their more enthusiastic call of Hamels returning the favor with a home run in the bottom half of the inning. In 2019, Len Kasper, who is currently the voice of the Cubs, broadcast Cubs-Nationals on Fox with a rather monotonous tone of voice while calling Nationals home runs.
- For the 2014 season, sister cable channel Fox Sports 1 began providing Major League Baseball game coverage, carrying a Fox Saturday Baseball doubleheader on most weeks. FS1's coverage begins with the pregame show a half-hour before the game, which usually starts at 1 or 4 p.m. Eastern Time. A second game usually follows at either 7 or 8 Eastern Time. If there is a gap between the first and second game, a studio show is not aired in between. All of the telecasts are aired nationally instead of on a regional basis; however, the telecast is not exclusive, unless the game is between two teams that whose games are broadcast on the Fox Sports regional networks. Prime time games continue to air on Fox, and once again used the 2010 scheduling formula for these telecasts, including full national exclusivity.
  - In 2014, the Fox Sports 1 cable network began airing regular-season games over 26 Saturdays. As a result, MLB regular season coverage on the over the air Fox network was reduced to 12 weeks.

=== 2000s ===
Year	Network(s)	Play-by-play	Color commentary
2009	Fox	Joe Buck; Thom Brennaman; Kenny Albert; Josh Lewin; Dick Stockton; Matt Vasgersian; Tom McCarthy; Chris Rose; Dick Bremer; Daron Sutton; Howie Rose; Glen Kuiper	Tim McCarver; Mark Grace; Eric Karros; José Mota; Rick Manning; Bert Blyleven; Rod Allen
2008	Fox	Joe Buck; Thom Brennaman; Kenny Albert; Dick Stockton; Matt Vasgersian; Dan McLaughlin; Tom McCarthy; Daron Sutton; Chris Rose; Brian Anderson; Howie Rose; Mike Joy; Curt Menefee; Glen Kuiper	Tim McCarver; Mark Grace; Eric Karros; José Mota; Leo Mazzone; Rick Manning; Jerry Remy; Chris Welsh; Joe Magrane; Bill Schroeder
2007	Fox	Joe Buck; Thom Brennaman; Kenny Albert; Josh Lewin; Dick Stockton; Matt Vasgersian; Dan McLaughlin; Matt Devlin; Brian Anderson; Daron Sutton; José Mota; Duane Kuiper	Tim McCarver; Mark Grace; Joe Girardi; Eric Karros; José Mota
2006	Fox	Joe Buck; Thom Brennaman; Kenny Albert; Josh Lewin; Dick Stockton; Matt Vasgersian; Scott Graham	Tim McCarver; Steve Lyons; Lou Piniella; Rick Manning; Mark Grant; José Mota; Chris Welsh; Jim Deshaies; Tommy Hutton; Rod Allen; Jerry Remy; Rex Hudler; Mark Grace
2005	Fox	Joe Buck; Thom Brennaman; Kenny Albert; Josh Lewin; Mel Proctor; Dick Stockton; Scott Graham; Duane Kuiper	Tim McCarver; Steve Lyons; Jeff Torborg; Darrin Jackson; Jim Deshaies; Tom Grieve; Larry Andersen; Todd Zeile; Tommy Hutton; Jim Palmer; Chris Welsh; Jerry Remy
2004	Fox	Joe Buck; Thom Brennaman; Kenny Albert; Josh Lewin; Mel Proctor; Dick Stockton; Daron Sutton	Tim McCarver; Steve Lyons; Jeff Torborg; Mark Grace; Jerry Remy; Jim Deshaies; Bert Blyleven; Jim Palmer; Larry Andersen; George Frazier; Chris Welsh; Duane Kuiper; Rex Hudler; Al Hrabosky; José Mota; Mike Krukow; Eric Karros
2003	Fox	Joe Buck; Thom Brennaman; Kenny Albert; Josh Lewin; Mel Proctor; Dick Stockton; Chip Caray	Tim McCarver; Steve Lyons; Jerry Remy; Kirk Gibson; Jim Deshaies; Rex Hudler; Al Hrabosky; Mark Langston; Larry Andersen; José Mota; Rick Manning; Tom Grieve; Chris Welsh; Paul Molitor; Mike Krukow; Joe Magrane; Bob Walk; Dave Henderson; Darrin Jackson; Tommy Hutton; Dave Otto
2002	Fox	Joe Buck; Thom Brennaman; Kenny Albert; Josh Lewin; Mel Proctor; Dan McLaughlin; Scott Graham	Tim McCarver; Steve Lyons; Chris Welsh; Rick Manning; Dave Henderson; Rex Hudler; Darrin Jackson; Larry Dierker; Jerry Remy; Ray Fosse; Larry Andersen; Jim Deshaies; Keith Hernandez; Joe Magrane; Jim Traber; Bert Blyleven; Bill Schroeder
2001	Fox	Joe Buck; Thom Brennaman; Kenny Albert; Josh Lewin; Mel Proctor; Steve Physioc	Tim McCarver; Steve Lyons; Chris Welsh; Rick Manning; José Mota; Rod Allen; Rex Hudler; Bert Blyleven; George Frazier
2000	Fox	Joe Buck; Thom Brennaman; Chip Caray; Josh Lewin	Tim McCarver; Bob Brenly; Jeff Torborg; Kevin Kennedy; Kirk Gibson

==== Notes ====
- For a Saturday afternoon telecast of a Los Angeles Dodgers/Chicago Cubs game at Wrigley Field on August 26, 2000, Fox aired a special "Turn Back the Clock" broadcast to commemorate the 61st anniversary of the first televised baseball game. The broadcast started with a recreation of the television technology of 1939, with play-by-play announcer Joe Buck working alone with a single microphone, a single black-and-white camera, and no graphics; each subsequent half-inning would then see the broadcast "jump ahead in time" to a later era, showing the evolving technologies and presentation of network baseball coverage through the years.
- In 2004, Fox's Game of the Week telecasts only appeared three times after August 28, due to ratings competition from college football (especially since Fox affiliates may have had syndicated college football broadcasts). One unidentified former Fox broadcaster complained by saying "Fox is MIA on the pennant race, and Joe [Buck] doesn't even do [September 18's] Red Sox-Yankees. What kind of sport would tolerate that?" By this point, Joe Buck was unavailable to call baseball games, since he became Fox's #1 NFL announcer (a job he has held since 2002). The following two seasons saw similar interruptions in Fox's September coverage.
- In 2007, Fox began airing games every Saturday during the season. A new scheduling format was devised, in which all of the regional games started simultaneously. Fox moved the pregame, which became part of the exclusive game window, to 3:30 p.m. Eastern Time. All of the Fox games would then start at 3:55 p.m. Eastern Time, regardless of region. This format gave more leeway for teams not being shown on Fox to schedule daytime games. Fox's exclusivity began at the start of the pregame at 3:30 and ran until 7 p.m. Eastern.
  - In 2007, Joe Buck was only scheduled to call eight regular season MLB games out of a 26-game schedule for Fox (along with a handful of regional St. Louis Cardinals telecasts on FSN Midwest).
  - Fox discontinued its pregame show in 2009, with the telecasts now beginning at 4 p.m. Eastern and the game time being pushed to 4:10. Fox gave up the first half-hour of its exclusivity, with its window now beginning at 4 p.m. Eastern Time. This scheduling formula was used through 2011 for the regular season. Beginning in 2010, several of the Saturday games aired in prime time during the spring. These telecasts used an exclusivity window from 7 to 10:30 p.m. Eastern Time, as the network revived a pregame show for these games, airing at 7 p.m. with the game at 7:15.

=== 1990s ===
Year	Network(s)	Play-by-play	Color commentary
1999	Fox	Joe Buck; Thom Brennaman; Chip Caray; Josh Lewin	Tim McCarver; Bob Brenly; Jeff Torborg; Frank Robinson or Kevin Kennedy
1998	Fox	Joe Buck; Thom Brennaman; John Rooney; Josh Lewin	Tim McCarver; Bob Brenly; Jeff Torborg; Frank Robinson or George Brett
1997	Fox	Joe Buck; Thom Brennaman; John Rooney; Josh Lewin	Tim McCarver; Bob Brenly; Jeff Torborg; Ken Singleton; Steve Lyons
1996	Fox	Joe Buck; Thom Brennaman; John Rooney; Josh Lewin	Tim McCarver; Bob Brenly; Jeff Torborg; Ken Singleton
1995	No Saturday afternoon games on network TV. Further information: The Baseball Network		
1994	No Saturday afternoon games on network TV. Further information: The Baseball Network		
1993	CBS	Sean McDonough; Greg Gumbel; Jim Kaat	Tim McCarver; Jim Kaat; Steve Stone
1992	CBS	Sean McDonough; Dick Stockton	Tim McCarver; Jim Kaat
1991	CBS	Jack Buck; Dick Stockton	Tim McCarver; Jim Kaat
1990	CBS	Jack Buck; Dick Stockton; Greg Gumbel	Tim McCarver; Jim Kaat

==== Notes ====
- CBS initially did not want to start their 1990 coverage until after the network had aired that year's NBA Finals (which was the last time CBS aired the Finals before the NBA's move to NBC). Therefore, only 12 regular season telecasts were scheduled The broadcasts would have been each Saturday from June 16 through August 25 and a special Sunday telecast on the weekend of August 11–12 (the New York Yankees against the Oakland Athletics in Oakland on both days). Ultimately, four more telecasts were added – two in April and two on the last two Saturdays of the season.
- After sustaining huge losses (CBS claimed to have lost about $55 million in after-taxes revenue in 1990, which would go up to $170 million at the end of its four-year contract) from 1990's abbreviated postseason (which ended with the Cincinnati Reds shockingly sweeping the defending World Champion Oakland Athletics in the World Series), CBS made several notable adjustments for 1991. Regular season telecasts were reduced to a meager handful. In return, pregame shows during the League Championship Series were entirely eliminated, to minimize the ratings damage.
  - On Sunday, May 5, CBS broadcast games involving Cleveland at Oakland (with Jack Buck and Tim McCarver on the call) and Boston at the Chicago White Sox (with Dick Stockton and Jim Kaat on the call). And then on Sunday, July 14, Dick Stockton and Jim Kaat called a game in Anaheim between the New York Yankees and California Angels.
- After two years of calling baseball telecasts for CBS, Jack Buck was dismissed in December 1991. According to the radio veteran Buck, he had a hard time adjusting to the demands of a more constricting television production. CBS felt that Buck should have done more to make himself appear to be a set-up man for lead analyst Tim McCarver. Buck's replacement was Boston Red Sox announcer Sean McDonough.
- After Major League Baseball's contract with CBS expired at the end of the 1993 season, the league decided to produce its own in-house telecasts of games, which were then brokered to air on ABC and NBC. The package included coverage of games in prime time on selected nights throughout the regular season (under the branding Baseball Night in America), along with coverage of the postseason and the World Series. Unlike previous broadcasting arrangements with the league, there was no national "game of the week" during the regular season; these would be replaced by multiple weekly regional telecasts on certain nights of the week. Additionally, The Baseball Network had exclusive coverage windows; no other broadcaster could televise MLB games during the same night that The Baseball Network was televising games.
  - After the All-Star Game was complete, ABC took over coverage with what was to be their weekly slate of games. ABC was scheduled to televise six regular season games on Saturdays or Mondays in prime time. NBC would then pick up where ABC left off by televising six more regular season Friday night games. Every Baseball Night in America game was scheduled to begin at 8 p.m. Eastern Time (or 8 p.m. Pacific Time if the game occurred on the West Coast). A single starting time gave the networks the opportunity to broadcast one game and then, simultaneously, cut to another game when there was a break in action.
- On November 7, 1995, Major League Baseball reached a television deal with Fox and NBC, allowing the former to obtain MLB game rights (assuming ABC's end of the contract). Fox paid $575 million for the five-year contract, a fraction less of the amount of money that CBS had paid for the Major League Baseball television rights for the 1990–1993 seasons. Unlike the previous television deal, "The Baseball Network" (a partnership created through the league's joint contract with ABC and NBC that began in the 1994 season), Fox reverted to the format of televising regular season games (approximately 16 weekly telecasts that normally began on Memorial Day weekend) on Saturday afternoons. Fox did, however, continue a format that The Baseball Network started by offering a selection of games based purely on a viewer's region. Fox's approach has usually been to offer three regionalized telecasts. The initial deal also gave Fox the rights to broadcast the 1996, 1998 and 2000 World Series, the 1997 and 1999 All-Star Games, as well as coverage of the League Championship Series (shared with NBC) and five Division Series games each year.
  - Like its predecessor NBC, Fox determined its Saturday schedule by which MLB franchise was playing a team from one of the three largest television markets – New York City, Los Angeles or Chicago. If there was a game which featured teams from two of these three markets (involving any combination of the Yankees, Mets, Dodgers, Angels, Cubs or White Sox), that game would be aired on the network.

=== 1980s ===
Year	Network(s)	Play-by-play	Color commentary
1989	NBC	Vin Scully; Bob Costas; Jay Randolph; Jon Miller; Ted Robinson; Charlie Slowes; Mel Proctor	Tom Seaver; Tony Kubek; Joe Torre; Jim Kaat; Bobby Mercer; Larry Dierker
1988	NBC	Vin Scully; Bob Costas; Jay Randolph; Jon Miller; Ted Robinson; Steve Zabriskie; Don Chevrier	Joe Garagiola; Tony Kubek; Kurt Bevacqua; Steve Garvey; Joe Torre; Fergie Olver
1987	NBC	Vin Scully; Bob Costas; Jay Randolph; Jon Miller; Ted Robinson; Bob Carpenter; Ken Harrelson	Joe Garagiola; Tony Kubek; Ken Harrelson; Joe Morgan
1986	NBC	Vin Scully; Bob Costas; Jay Randolph; Jon Miller; Ted Robinson	Joe Garagiola; Tony Kubek; Jim Kaat; Joe Morgan; Mike Shannon; John Lowenstein
1985	NBC	Vin Scully; Bob Costas; Jay Randolph; Phil Stone; Ken Harrelson	Joe Garagiola; Tony Kubek; Jim Kaat; Mike Shannon; Ken Harrelson; Joe Torre
1984	NBC	Vin Scully; Bob Costas; Jay Randolph; Dick Enberg; Phil Stone	Joe Garagiola; Tony Kubek; Jim Kaat; Mike Shannon; Ken Harrelson; Bucky Dent
1983	NBC	Vin Scully; Bob Costas; Jay Randolph; Phil Stone; Len Berman	Joe Garagiola; Tony Kubek
1982	NBC	Joe Garagiola; Dick Enberg; Bob Costas; Jay Randolph; Charlie Jones; Phil Stone	Tony Kubek; Sal Bando; Freddie Patek; Tim McCarver
1981	NBC	Joe Garagiola; Merle Harmon; Dick Enberg; Bob Costas; Jay Randolph	Tony Kubek; Ron Luciano; Tom Seaver; Willie McCovey; Al Kaline
1980	NBC	Joe Garagiola; Merle Harmon; Dick Enberg; Bob Costas	Tony Kubek; Ron Luciano; Tim McCarver

==== Notes ====
- On October 4, 1980, Bob Costas made his debut calling baseball games for NBC. It was a backup game (the primary game involved the Philadelphia Phillies and Montreal Expos) involving the New York Yankees and Detroit Tigers from Yankee Stadium.
- During the 1981 players' strike, NBC used its Saturday Game of the Week time-slot to show a 20-minute strike update, followed by a sports anthology series hosted by Bruce Jenner (Note: Jenner changed her name due to gender transition in 2015.) called NBC Sports: The Summer Season.
  - Even though Dick Enberg did play-by-play for the 1981 NLCS for NBC (working alongside Tom Seaver), Merle Harmon was, for the most part, NBC's backup baseball play-by-play announcer (serving behind Joe Garagiola, who called that year's ALCS for NBC with Tony Kubek) in 1981. Harmon's broadcast partner during this period was Ron Luciano. In late 1979, Harmon left the Milwaukee Brewers completely in favor of a multi-year pact with NBC. Harmon saw the NBC deal as a perfect opportunity since according to The Milwaukee Journal he would make more money, get more exposure, and do less traveling. At NBC, Harmon did SportsWorld, the backup Game of the Week, and served as a field reporter for the 1980 World Series. Most of all, Harmon had hoped to cover the American-boycotted 1980 Summer Olympics from Moscow. After NBC pulled out of their scheduled coverage of the 1980 Summer Olympics, Harmon considered it to be "a great letdown." To add insult to injury, NBC fired Harmon in 1982 in favor of Bob Costas. It was in 1982 that Costas started working the NBC backup games on a full-time basis, with former Oakland A's third baseman Sal Bando as his color man.
- According to his autobiography, Oh My, Dick Enberg (then the lead play-by-play voice for The NFL on NBC) was informed by NBC that he would become the lead play-by-play voice of the Major League Baseball Game of the Week beginning with the 1982 World Series (sharing the play-by-play duties for that game with Joe Garagiola, alongside analyst Tony Kubek) and through subsequent regular seasons. Enberg wrote that on his football trips, he would read every edition of The Sporting News to make sure he was current with all the baseball news and notes. He then met with NBC executives in September 1982, who informed him that Vin Scully was in negotiations to be their lead baseball play-by-play announcer (teaming with Garagiola, while Kubek would team with Bob Costas) and began with the network in the spring of 1983. Therefore, rather than throw him in randomly for one World Series, Enberg wrote that he hosted the pre-game/post-game shows while the team of Joe Garagiola and Tony Kubek did the games. According to the book, Enberg was not pleased about the decision (since he loved being the Los Angeles Angels' radio voice in the 1970s and was eager to return to baseball) but the fact that NBC was bringing in Scully, arguably baseball's best announcer, was understandable. Enberg added that NBC also gave him a significant pay increase as a pseudo-apology for not coming through on the promise to make him the lead baseball play-by-play announcer.
- On April 7, 1983, Major League Baseball agreed to terms with ABC and NBC on a six-year television package, worth $1.2 billion. The two networks would continue to alternate coverage of the playoffs (ABC in even-numbered years and NBC in odd-numbered years), World Series (ABC would televise the World Series in odd-numbered years and NBC in even-numbered years) and All-Star Game (ABC would televise the All-Star Game in even-numbered years and NBC in odd-numbered years) through the 1989 season, with each of the 26 clubs receiving $7 million per year in return (even if no fans showed up). This was a substantial increase over the last package, in which each club was being paid $1.9 million per year. ABC contributed $575 million for the rights to televise prime time and Sunday afternoon regular season games and NBC paid $550 million for the rights to broadcast 30 Saturday afternoon games.
- 1984 was the first year that the Game of the Week was not subject to blackout. NBC and ABC generally still aired two games each week, with a primary game carried to most of the country and a secondary game to mostly the markets that would carry that game. This was mostly done for insurance in the event that a game was rained out. During the 1970s and early 1980s, many of the "rainout insurance" games involved the Houston Astros since that team played in a domed ballpark. Therefore, if the Astros were at home on a given Saturday or Monday night, then it was a safe bet that the game would be shown on network television, due to the Astros being the only "dome" team (until the Seattle Mariners began play in the Kingdome in 1977).
- Starting in 1986, Jon Miller would call games for NBC on their occasional doubleheader weeks. If not that, then Miller would appear on Saturday afternoon regionals the day after NBC's occasional prime time telecasts.
- After calling the 1988 World Series with Vin Scully, Joe Garagiola resigned from NBC Sports. Although it was not official at the time, NBC was on the verge of losing the television rights to cover Major League Baseball to CBS. Garagiola claimed that NBC left him "twisting" while he was trying to renegotiate his deal. Joe Garagiola was replaced by Tom Seaver for the 1989 season.

=== 1970s ===
Year	Network(s)	Play-by-play	Color commentary
1979	NBC	Joe Garagiola; Jim Simpson; Monte Moore; Dick Enberg; Charlie Jones	Tony Kubek; Wes Parker; Sparky Anderson
1978	NBC	Joe Garagiola; Monte Moore; Charlie Jones; Dick Enberg	Tony Kubek; Maury Wills; Wes Parker; Hank Aaron
1977	NBC	Joe Garagiola; Jim Simpson; Dick Enberg; Charlie Jones; Marv Albert	Tony Kubek; Maury Wills; Don Drysdale; Art Shamsky
1976	NBC	Joe Garagiola; Jim Simpson; Jack Buck; Jay Randolph	Tony Kubek; Maury Wills
1975	NBC	Curt Gowdy; Joe Garagiola; Jim Simpson; Bill O'Donnell; Jay Randolph; Marv Albert	Tony Kubek; Maury Wills
1974	NBC	Curt Gowdy; Jim Simpson; Joe Garagiola; Bill O'Donnell; Marv Albert	Tony Kubek; Maury Wills; Dick Williams
1973	NBC	Curt Gowdy; Jim Simpson; Bill Enis; Bill O'Donnell; Jay Randolph	Tony Kubek; Maury Wills
1972	NBC	Curt Gowdy; Jim Simpson; Bill Enis; Bill O'Donnell; Jay Randolph	Tony Kubek; Sandy Koufax
1971	NBC	Curt Gowdy; Jim Simpson	Tony Kubek; Sandy Koufax
1970	NBC	Curt Gowdy; Jim Simpson; Bill O'Donnell	Tony Kubek; Sandy Koufax

==== Notes ====
- In 1971, Sandy Koufax signed a ten-year contract with NBC for $1 million to serve as a broadcaster on the Saturday Game of the Week. Koufax never felt comfortable being in front of the camera, and quit before the 1973 season.
- Starting in 1975, Joe Garagiola and Curt Gowdy alternated as the Saturday Game of Week play-by-play announcers with Tony Kubek doing color analysis. Then on weeks in which NBC had Monday Night Baseball, Gowdy and Garagiola worked together. One would call play-by-play for 4½ innings, the other would handle color analysis. Then in the bottom of the 5th inning, their roles switched. Ultimately, in November 1975, Chrysler forced NBC to totally remove Curt Gowdy from NBC's top baseball team. Instead, the company wanted their spokesman, Joe Garagiola, to call all the main regular season games, All-Star Games (when NBC had them), the top League Championship Series (when NBC had it), and the World Series (when NBC had it).

=== 1960s ===
Year	Network(s)	Play-by-play	Color commentary
1969	NBC	Curt Gowdy; Jim Simpson; Bill O'Donnell	Tony Kubek; Sandy Koufax; Buddy Blattner
1968	NBC	Curt Gowdy; Jim Simpson	Pee Wee Reese; Tony Kubek
1967	NBC	Curt Gowdy; Jim Simpson	Pee Wee Reese; Tony Kubek
1966	NBC	Curt Gowdy; Jim Simpson; Charlie Jones	Pee Wee Reese; Tony Kubek
1965	ABC	Chris Schenkel; Merle Harmon; Keith Jackson; Ken Coleman; Bob Wolff	Leo Durocher; Jackie Robinson; Tommy Henrich; Warren Spahn; Jimmy Piersall
1965	CBS	Dizzy Dean	Pee Wee Reese
1964		Dizzy Dean	Pee Wee Reese
1964	NBC	Bob Wolff	Joe Garagiola; Buddy Blattner
1963	CBS	Dizzy Dean	Pee Wee Reese
1963	NBC	Bob Wolff	Joe Garagiola
1962	CBS	Dizzy Dean; Gene Kirby	Pee Wee Reese
1962	NBC	Bob Wolff	Joe Garagiola
1961	CBS	Dizzy Dean; Russ Meyer	Pee Wee Reese; Frankie Frisch
1961	NBC	Lindsey Nelson	Joe Garagiola
1960	ABC	Jack Buck	Carl Erskine
1960	CBS	Dizzy Dean; Jack Whitaker; Bob Finnegan	Pee Wee Reese; Frankie Frisch; Gabby Hartnett
1960	NBC	Lindsey Nelson; Chuck Thompson	Fred Haney; Al Rosen

==== Notes ====
- In 1960, ABC typically did three games a week. Two of the games were always from the Eastern or Central Time Zone. The late games (no doubleheaders) were usually San Francisco Giants or Los Angeles Dodgers' home games. However, the Milwaukee Braves used to start many of their Saturday home games late in the afternoon. So if the Giants and Dodgers were both the road at the same time, ABC still would be able to show a late game.
  - Jerry Coleman hosted the pregame show for CBS' Game of the Week broadcasts.
- Despite temporarily losing the Game of the Week package in 1961, ABC still televised several games in prime time (with Jack Buck returning to call the action). This occurred as Roger Maris was poised to tie and subsequently break Babe Ruth's regular season home run record of 60. As with all Major League Baseball games in those days, the action was totally blacked out of major league markets. As a matter of fact, as documented in the HBO film 61*, the Maris family was welcomed into ABC's Kansas City, Missouri affiliate KMBC-TV so they could watch the in-house feed of the game, which was blacked out of Kansas City.
- In 1962, CBS dropped the Sunday baseball Game of the Week once the NFL season started, dropping the option clause for affiliates to carry baseball or football in place since 1957.
- By 1964, CBS' Dean and Reese called games from Yankee Stadium, Wrigley Field, St. Louis, Philadelphia and Baltimore. The New York Yankees got a $550,000 share of CBS' $895,000. Six clubs that exclusively played nationally televised games on NBC were paid $1.2 million.
- In 1965, ABC provided the first-ever nationwide baseball coverage with weekly Saturday broadcasts on a regional basis. ABC paid $5.7 million for the rights to the 28 Saturday/holiday Games of the Week. ABC's deal covered all of the teams except the New York Yankees and Philadelphia Phillies (who had their own television deals) and called for two regionalized games on Saturdays, Independence Day, and Labor Day. Each Saturday, ABC broadcast two 2 p.m. games and one 5 p.m. game for the Pacific Time Zone. ABC blacked out the games in the home cities of the clubs playing those games. Major League Baseball however, had a TV deal with NBC for the All-Star Game and World Series. At the end of the season, ABC declined to exercise its $6.5 million option for 1966, citing poor ratings, especially in New York.
  - Until 1965 (when Major League Baseball made its first ever, league-wide regular-season network television deal with ABC), there was no league-wide national television package for regular season Major League Baseball games. As a result, teams, if they so desired, could sell the rights to the networks. Also prior to 1965, regular season Major League Baseball telecasts broadcast by networks had to be blacked-out in cities with league franchises. More to the point, by around the year prior, thanks to expansion (in 1960 and 1961), regular season MLB games shown on network television were blacked out in most major markets. However, the network Games of the Week, up until the late 1980s, still could not be seen in the two cities whose local teams were playing in each respective game.
  - From 1965 until the late 1980s, networks would cover two Saturday afternoon games each week: one that went to most of the network (a "primary game"), and the second being seen only in the home markets of the two teams playing in the network's "primary" game. Although the "primary" game would not be televised in each team's home markets, local television rights-holders in those cities were free to broadcast that game. The manner that this worked allowed, for instance, a network's two Saturday afternoon Games of the Week involving the New York Yankees at the Boston Red Sox serving as the primary game and St. Louis Cardinals at the Chicago Cubs being the secondary game. The Yankees-Red Sox game would as a result, be seen everywhere except in New York City, Boston and possibly markets adjacent to those cities. Ultimately, those markets got the Cardinals-Cubs game instead.
- In 1966, the New York Yankees, which in the year prior played 21 Games of the Week for CBS (which had actually just purchased the Yankees), joined NBC's television package. The new package under NBC called for 28 games compared to the 123 aired across the three networks in 1960.
  - The New York Yankees, which, the year before, had played 21 Games of the Week for CBS, joined NBC's package in 1966. The new package under NBC called for 28 games, as compared to the 123 combined among three networks during the 1960s. On October 19, 1966, NBC signed a three-year contract with Major League Baseball. As previously mentioned, the year before, Major League Baseball sold an exclusive league-wide television package for the rights to the Saturday-Sunday Game of the Week to ABC. NBC covered only the All-Star Game and World Series in 1965. In addition, a previous deal limited CBS to covering only twelve weekends when its new subsidiary, the New York Yankees, played at home. As previously mentioned, before 1965, NBC aired a slate of Saturday afternoon games beginning in 1957. Under the new deal, NBC paid roughly US$6 million per year for the 25 Games of the Week, $6.1 million for the 1967 World Series and All-Star Game, and $6.5 million for the 1968 World Series and 1968 All-Star Game. This brought the total value of the contract (which included three Monday night telecasts such as a Labor Day 1966 contest between the San Francisco Giants and Los Angeles Dodgers) up to $30.6 million.
  - On April 16, 1966, in New York City, about 50 baseball, network, and advertising officials discussed NBC's first year with the Game of the Week. New York could not get a primary match-up between the Detroit Tigers and New York Yankees with Curt Gowdy and Pee Wee Reese calling the action because of local blackout rules. Instead, that market received a backup game (or "'B' game") featuring Tony Kubek and Jim Simpson calling a game between the Cincinnati Reds and Chicago Cubs. That rule would be eliminated after the 1983 season.

=== 1950s ===
Year	Network(s)	Play-by-play	Color commentary
1959	CBS	Dizzy Dean; Jack Whitaker; Bob Finnegan	Buddy Blattner; Frankie Frisch; Gabby Hartnett
1959	NBC	Lindsey Nelson; Chuck Thompson	Leo Durocher; Al Rosen
1958	CBS	Dizzy Dean; Bob Finnegan	Buddy Blattner; Frank Reynolds
1958	NBC	Lindsey Nelson; Chuck Thompson	Leo Durocher; Bill Veeck
1957	CBS	Dizzy Dean; Bob Finnegan	Buddy Blattner; Jim McKay
1957	NBC	Lindsey Nelson; Jim Woods	Leo Durocher
1956	CBS	Dizzy Dean; Bill McColgan	Buddy Blattner; Bob Finnegan
1955	CBS	Dizzy Dean; Bill McColgan	Buddy Blattner; Bob Finnegan
1954	ABC	Dizzy Dean; Bill McColgan	Buddy Blattner; Bob Finnegan
1953	ABC	Dizzy Dean	Buddy Blattner; Bob Finnegan

==== Notes ====
- In April 1953, ABC-TV executive Edgar J. Scherick set out to sell teams rights but instead, only got the Philadelphia Athletics, Cleveland Indians, and Chicago White Sox to sign on. These were not "national" broadcast contracts since they were assembled through negotiations with individual teams to telecast games from their home parks. It was until the Sports Broadcasting Act of 1961, that antitrust laws barred "pooled rights" TV contracts negotiated with a central league broadcasting authority.
- CBS took over the Saturday Game in 1955 (the rights were actually set up through the Falstaff Brewing Corporation) retaining Dean/Blattner and McColgan/Finnegan as the announcing crews (as well as Gene Kirby, who produced the Dean/Blattner games and alternated with them on play-by-play) and adding Sunday coverage in 1957.
- In 1958, George Kell served as host for the pregame show on CBS.
  - From 1958 to 1960, NBC aired a special regional feed of its games in the southeast, where the network had a different sponsor (such as National Bohemian beer) than for the rest of the country. This feed featured its own announcing team, with Chuck Thompson calling the games with Bill Veeck (1958) and Al Rosen (1959–60). NBC never had a true backup game until 1966, when the network got exclusivity for the Game of the Week. In the process, NBC brought in Curt Gowdy and Pee Wee Reese for the primary game, and Jim Simpson and Tony Kubek for the alternate game (which was always shown in the markets of teams playing in the primary game).

== Radio ==
=== 2020s ===
Year	Network(s)	Play-by-play	Color commentary
2021	ESPN	Jon Sciambi	Chris Singleton
2020	ESPN	Jon Sciambi	Chris Singleton

==== Notes ====
- For the 2020 season, due to the COVID-19 pandemic, Jon Sciambi and Chris Singleton called each game remote working, rather than from the ballpark. For the 2020 postseason, they and all of ESPN Radio's announcers called the games from the ESPN studios in Bristol, Connecticut.

=== 2010s ===
Year	Network(s)	Play-by-play	Color commentary
2019	ESPN	Jon Sciambi	Chris Singleton
2018	ESPN	Jon Sciambi	Chris Singleton
2017	ESPN	Jon Sciambi	Chris Singleton
2016	ESPN	Jon Sciambi	Chris Singleton
2015	ESPN	Jon Sciambi	Chris Singleton
2014	ESPN	Jon Sciambi	Chris Singleton
2013	ESPN	Jon Sciambi	Chris Singleton
2013	Compass Media	Chris Carrino; Steve Quis	Darryl Hamilton; Steve Phillips
2012	ESPN	Jon Sciambi	Chris Singleton
2012	Compass Media	Chris Carrino; Steve Quis	Darryl Hamilton; Steve Phillips
2011	ESPN	Jon Sciambi	Chris Singleton
2010	ESPN	Jon Sciambi	Dave Campbell

==== Notes ====
- As of 2011, the primary ESPN Radio crew for Sunday Night Baseball consists of play-by-play announcer Jon Sciambi and color analyst Chris Singleton. In 2010, Sciambi succeeded Gary Thorne, who had called play-by-play in 2008–09; Thorne had succeeded Dan Shulman, did so from 2002–07; Shulman, in turn, had been preceded by Charley Steiner from 1998–2002. Singleton succeeded Dave Campbell, who was an analyst from 1999–2010. Campbell replaced Kevin Kennedy as analyst in 1999, after the latter had worked with Steiner in the network's inaugural season of coverage. Marc Kestecher currently serves as the network's primary Baseball Tonight studio host; he was preceded by Joe D'Ambrosio from 1998–2007.
  - As of 2018, Dan Shulman calls the World Series and one of the two League Championship Series with Singleton each year, while Sciambi calls the other LCS with Sunday Night Baseball TV analyst Jessica Mendoza. Various other announcers work the network's secondary regular-season, Wild Card Game and Division Series broadcasts as needed. Sciambi and Singleton also call the All-Star Game and Home Run Derby each year.
- On May 15, 2012, the Los Angeles Angels of Anaheim signed a radio rights deal with syndicator Compass Media to distribute 25 games to a nationwide audience, in a game-of-the-week format. These games would be produced separately from the KLAA broadcasts, and would feature veteran play-by-play men Chris Carrino and Steve Quis, with former New York Mets general manager and current SiriusXM sports talk show host Steve Phillips and former MLB player Darryl Hamilton as color commentators.

=== 2000s ===
Year	Network(s)	Play-by-play	Color commentary
2009	ESPN	Gary Thorne	Dave Campbell
2008	ESPN	Gary Thorne	Dave Campbell
2007	ESPN	Dan Shulman	Dave Campbell
2006	ESPN	Dan Shulman	Dave Campbell
2005	ESPN	Dan Shulman	Dave Campbell
2004	ESPN	Dan Shulman	Dave Campbell
2003	ESPN	Dan Shulman	Dave Campbell
2002	ESPN	Dan Shulman	Dave Campbell
2001	ESPN	Charley Steiner	Dave Campbell
2000	ESPN	Charley Steiner	Dave Campbell

=== 1990s ===
Year	Network(s)	Play-by-play	Color commentary
1999	ESPN	Charley Steiner	Dave Campbell
1998	ESPN	Charley Steiner	Kevin Kennedy
1997	CBS	Gary Cohen; Jerry Coleman; Hank Greenwald; Ernie Harwell; Jim Hunter; John Rooney	Al Downing; Jeff Torborg; Rick Cerone
1996	CBS	Gary Cohen; Jerry Coleman; Ernie Harwell; Jim Hunter; John Rooney	Al Downing; Jeff Torborg
1995	CBS	Joe Buck; Gary Cohen; Jerry Coleman; Gene Elston; Ernie Harwell; Jim Hunter; John Rooney	Al Downing; Jeff Torborg
1994	CBS	Joe Buck; Steve Busby; Jerry Coleman; Gene Elston; Ernie Harwell; Jim Hunter; John Rooney	Al Downing; Jeff Torborg
1993	CBS	Johnny Bench; Joe Buck; Steve Busby; Jerry Coleman; Gene Elston; Ernie Harwell; Jim Hunter; John Rooney	Al Downing; Jeff Torborg
1992	CBS	Johnny Bench; Steve Busby; Jerry Coleman; Gene Elston; Steve Garvey; Ernie Harwell; Jim Hunter; Frank Messer; John Rooney	Al Downing; Jeff Torborg
1991	CBS	Johnny Bench; Steve Busby; Jerry Coleman; Gene Elston; Steve Garvey; Jim Hunter; Frank Messer; John Rooney	Al Downing; Jeff Torborg
1990	CBS	Johnny Bench; Steve Busby; Jerry Coleman; Gene Elston; Steve Garvey; Jim Hunter; Frank Messer; John Rooney	Al Downing; Jeff Torborg

==== Notes ====
- In 1998, ESPN Radio took over from CBS Radio as the official, national radio broadcaster for Major League Baseball. The games include Opening Day, Sunday Night Baseball, Saturday Game of the Week, holiday games and September pennant race games.

=== 1985-1989 ===
Year	Network(s)	Play-by-play
1989	CBS	Johnny Bench; Steve Busby; Jerry Coleman; Gene Elston; Jim Hunter; Brent Musburger; John Rooney; Bill White
1988	CBS	Johnny Bench; Steve Busby; Jerry Coleman; Gene Elston; Jim Hunter; Brent Musburger; John Rooney; Bill White
1987	CBS	Johnny Bench; Steve Busby; Jerry Coleman; Gene Elston; Jim Hunter; Brent Musburger; John Rooney; Bill White
1986	CBS	Johnny Bench; Gary Cohen; Jerry Coleman; Curt Gowdy; Jim Hunter; Bob Murphy; Brent Musburger; Lindsey Nelson; John Rooney; Bill White
1985	CBS	Johnny Bench; Jerry Coleman; Curt Gowdy; Bob Murphy; Brent Musburger; Lindsey Nelson; John Rooney; Bill White

==== Notes ====
- In 1985, CBS Radio started broadcasting a weekly Game of the Week. CBS Radio usually did two games each Saturday, one on the afternoons and another during the evenings. Typically, CBS' markets aired only the afternoon broadcasts. The games covered varied from the ones NBC-TV were offering at the time to games outside of NBC's sight. One notable exception was KCBS in San Francisco, who almost always did the evening games. In 1994, just before the strike, KNBR carried the broadcasts in San Francisco and finally aired some of CBS' afternoon games. However, following the strike, KNBR dropped CBS' regular season broadcasts, and with the exception of 1995, when all playoff games were played at the same time, they usually only carried one or two Division Series games on days when there were three games played.
  - From 1985–1993, the two announcers calling the games at hand split play-by-play duties. From 1994 until the end of its coverage in 1997, CBS Radio used Jeff Torborg and Al Downing (as well as Rick Cerone in 1997) as color analysts paired with the play-by-play announcers.

=== 1950s-1960 ===
Year	Network(s)	Play-by-play	Color commentary
1960	Mutual	Gene Elston; John MacLean; Van Patrick	
1959	Mutual	Gene Elston; John MacLean	
1958	Mutual	Gene Elston; Art Gleeson; John MacLean	Bob Feller
1957	Mutual	Art Gleeson; John MacLean	
1956	Mutual	Art Gleeson; John MacLean; Bob Neal	
1955	Mutual	Art Gleeson; John MacLean; Bob Neal	Mel Ott
1954	Mutual	Bud Blattner; Al Helfer; Art Gleeson	
1953	Mutual	Al Helfer; Art Gleeson	
1952	Liberty	Gordon McLendon	
1952	Mutual	Bud Blattner; Dizzy Dean; Al Helfer; Art Gleeson; Gene Kirby	
1951	Liberty	Bud Blattner; Jerry Doggett; Gordon McLendon; Lindsey Nelson	
1951	Mutual	Dizzy Dean; Art Gleeson; Al Helfer; Gene Kirby; Hal Totten; Bob Wolff	
1950	Liberty	Bud Blattner; Jerry Doggett; Gordon McLendon; Lindsey Nelson	
1950	Mutual	Art Gleeson; Gene Kirby; Hal Totten; Bob Wolff	

==== Notes ====
- In 1957, NBC replaced Mutual as the exclusive national radio broadcaster for the World Series and All-Star Game. The network would continue in this role through 1975, with CBS taking over the rights the following year. NBC Radio did not air regular season games during this period (save for the three-game National League pennant playoff series in 1959 and 1962); nor did the network cover the League Championship Series from 1969 to 1975, those series instead having local team radio broadcasts syndicated nationally over ad hoc networks.

=== 1939-1940s ===
Year	Network(s)	Play-by-play
1949	Liberty	Gordon McLendon
1949	Mutual	Hal Totten
1948	Mutual	Hal Totten
1947	Mutual	Hal Totten
1946	Mutual	Hal Totten
1945	Mutual	Hal Totten
1944	Mutual	France Laux
1941	Mutual	France Laux
1940	Mutual	France Laux
1939	Mutual	France Laux

==== Notes ====
- In the 1940s and 1950s, Wes Wise was a play-by-play sports announcer for Gordon McLendon's Liberty Broadcasting System radio network, which mainly broadcast live recreations of Major League Baseball games by means of broadcasters like Wise following the action via Western Union ticker tape reports, and then relaying the plays to the listening audience in a more lively style that included studio sound effects meant to simulate the ballgames.
  - According to Time magazine articles of the era, McLendon only paid Major League Baseball $1,000.00 per year for the rights to broadcast the games, but in 1951, the leagues raised the price to $250,000.00 per year, and prohibited broadcasts in any city which had a minor league franchise and in the northeastern and midwestern United States.
  - Sports were the lifeblood of the Liberty Broadcasting System. Restrictions on Major League Baseball broadcasts in minor league franchise areas, as well as bans on National Football League broadcasts within a 75-mile range of league cities, were the one-two blow which ended the network. Since the baseball games were a major draw for both listeners and affiliates, the blackout was a disaster for the fledgling company, which had only posted modest profits during its first few years of operation. More than 100 stations left the network, and, faced with mounting debts, on May 16, 1952, the network ceased broadcasting.
- Following the lead of the rival Liberty Broadcasting System, Mutual also aired regular-season Game of the Day broadcasts (a precursor to television's Game of the Week concept) to non-major-league cities throughout the 1940s and 1950s.

== See also ==
- List of Major League Baseball on ABC announcers
- List of Major League Baseball on Fox broadcasters
- List of Major League Baseball on NBC broadcasters
- List of current Major League Baseball broadcasters
- Game of the Week radio broadcasters
  - CBS Radio
  - ESPN Radio
