= Major League Baseball on television in the 1950s =

MLB on TV in the 1950s

In 1950 the Mutual Broadcasting System acquired the television and radio broadcast rights to the World Series and All-Star Game for the next six years. Mutual may have been reindulging in dreams of becoming a television network or simply taking advantage of a long-standing business relationship; in either case, the broadcast rights were sold to NBC in time for the following season's games at an enormous profit.

== Year-by-year breakdown ==
=== 1950 ===
On July 11, 1950 the All-Star Game out of Chicago's Comiskey Park was televised for the first time. On November 8, 1950, Commissioner Happy Chandler and player reps agreed on the split of the TV-radio rights from the World Series.

By 1950 World Series games could be seen in most of the country, but not all. 1950 also marked the first time that there was an exclusive network television broadcaster (NBC). West Coast viewers finally saw live major league games on television during the 1951 postseason.

=== 1951 ===
On August 11, 1951 WCBS-TV in New York City televised the first baseball game (in which the Boston Braves beat the Brooklyn Dodgers by the score of 8–4) in color. On October 1 of that year, NBC aired the first coast-to-coast baseball telecast as the Brooklyn Dodgers were beaten by the New York Giants in the first game of a playoff series by the score of 3–1 featuring Bobby Thomson's two-run home run. Thomson's famous now-legendary home run would occur in the third game of the best of 3 series.

NBC aired the second and third games of the 1951 National League tie-breaker series between the Brooklyn Dodgers and New York Giants, necessitated by the teams' finishing the regular season in a tie for first place. The three-game pennant playoff, which featured the first baseball games televised live from coast to coast (with CBS airing the first game), culminated on October 3 when the Giants won the third and deciding game by the score of 5–4 (off Bobby Thomson's home run). Ernie Harwell called the game for Giants television flagship WPIX – the independent station's broadcast was simulcast nationally by NBC – and his description of the home run was a simple shout of "It's gone!" almost at the moment Thomson's bat struck Ralph Branca's pitch. Harwell later admitted he had probably called it "too soon", but fortunately for him, the call proved to be correct. "And then", Harwell recalled, "the pictures took over."

The 1951 playoff between Brooklyn and the New York Giants and that year's World Series were the first major league baseball games telecast live from coast-to-coast to coast; transcontinental network transmission lines had been completed and activated in September, in-time for the Japanese Peace Treaty Conference in San Francisco and the start of the 1951–52 television season.

=== 1952 ===
The 1952 All-Star Game at Shibe Park in Philadelphia was the first nationally televised All-Star Game, but it was shortened due to rain.

=== 1953 ===
On January 31, 1953 the New York Yankees, Cleveland Indians and Boston Red Sox joined forces against St. Louis Browns owner Bill Veeck. The respective franchises tried to force the Browns to play afternoon games in an attempt to avoid having to share television revenues. A month later, Major League Baseball owners received a warning from Senator Edwin Johnson about nationally televising their games. Johnson's theory was that nationally televising baseball games would be a threat to the survival of minor league baseball. The owners pretty much ignored Johnson since the games on NBC in particular, were gaining a large and loyal following.

In 1953 ABC-TV executive Edgar J. Scherick (who later created Wide World of Sports) broached a Saturday Game of the Week, TV sport's first network series. At the time, ABC was labeled a "nothing network" that had fewer outlets than CBS or NBC. ABC also needed paid programming or "anything for bills" as Scherick put it. At first, ABC hesitated at the idea of a nationally televised regular season baseball program. ABC wondered how exactly the Game of the Week would reach television in the first place and who would notice if it did? Also, Major League Baseball barred the Game of the Week from airing within 50 miles of any ballpark. Major League Baseball according to Scherick, insisted on protecting local coverage and didn't care about national appeal. ABC, though, did care about the national appeal and claimed that "most of America was still up for grabs."

In April 1953 Edgar Scherick set out to sell teams rights but instead, only got the Philadelphia Athletics, Cleveland Indians, and Chicago White Sox to sign on. These were not "national" broadcast contracts since they were assembled through negotiations with individual teams to telecast games from their home parks. It was until the Sports Broadcasting Act of 1961, that antitrust laws barred "pooled rights" TV contracts negotiated with a central league broadcasting authority.

In 1953 ABC earned an 11.4 rating for their Game of the Week telecasts. Blacked-out cities had 32% of households. In the rest of the United States, 3 in 4 TV sets in use watched Dizzy Dean and Buddy Blattner (or backup announcers Bill McColgan and Bob Finnegan) call the games for ABC. CBS took over the Saturday Game in 1955 (the rights were actually set up through the Falstaff Brewing Corporation) retaining Dean/Blattner and McColgan/Finnegan as the announcing crews (as well as Gene Kirby, who produced the Dean/Blattner games and alternated with them on play-by-play) and adding Sunday coverage in 1957. As Edgar Scherick said, "In '53, no one wanted us. Now teams begged for "Game"'s cash."

=== 1955 ===
By 1955 Dizzy Dean and the Game of the Week would move from ABC to CBS (the rights were actually set up through the Falstaff Brewing Corporation). "CBS' stakes were higher" said Buddy Blattner, who left the Mutual Broadcasting System to rejoin Dean. Ron Powers wrote about the reteaming of Dean and Blattner, "they wanted someone who'd known Diz, could bring him out." Gene Kirby, who had worked with Dean and Blattner at Mutual and ABC, produced the telecasts and also filled in on announcing duties.

Bob Finnegan, who along with Bill McColgan had called backup games for ABC, performed the same role for CBS, working with a variety of color men including future Wide World of Sports host Jim McKay and future World News Tonight anchor Frank Reynolds.

Another first for NBC during this period was the first color telecast of a World Series, the 1955 matchup between the Brooklyn Dodgers and the New York Yankees.

=== 1956 ===
In 1956 CBS Sports director Frank Chirkinian devised an earplug called an Intercepted Feed Back (or IFB) to connect the announcer, director, producer and thus, smoothing on-air flow.

=== 1957 ===
In 1957 NBC started airing weekend Game of the Week telecasts (Sunday telecasts were added in 1959) with Lindsey Nelson and Leo Durocher calling the action. During this period, NBC (as rival CBS had the rights to broadcast at least eight teams) typically broadcast from Pittsburgh's Forbes Field, Chicago's Wrigley Field or Milwaukee's County Stadium. NBC purchased the rights to 11 Milwaukee Braves games, 11 Pittsburgh Pirates games, two Washington Senators games, and two Chicago Cubs games. Leo Durocher was succeeded as color commentator by Fred Haney in 1960, and Joe Garagiola in 1961, while Bob Wolff replaced Nelson on play-by-play in 1962.

Also in 1957 CBS added a Sunday Game of the Week. ABC's Edgar Scherick said "In '53, no one wanted us. Now teams begged for "Game"'s cash." That year, the National Football League (NFL) began a US$14.1 million revenue-sharing pact. By 1965, Major League Baseball ended the large-market blackout, got $6.5 million for exclusivity, and split the pot.

With CBS now carrying the Game of the Week, the network's stations in Phoenix (KOOL-TV), Little Rock (KTHV) and Cedar Rapids (KGAN-TV) were finally receiving the broadcasts. Bud Blattner said "America had never had TV network ball. Now you're getting two games a week [four, counting NBC, by 1959]."

=== 1958 ===
In 1958 Dizzy Dean ruffled the feathers of CBS Sports head Bill MacPhail when he said "I don't know how we come off callin' this the 'Game of the Week'. There's a much better game – Dodgers–Giants – over on NBC." Dean also once refused a Falstaff ad because the date was Mother's Day. When United Airlines backed CBS' Game of the Week telecasts, Dean – who hated to fly – said "If you have to, pod-nuh, Eastern is much the best." That year, George Kell served as host for the pregame show. During one broadcast, Kell hoped to ask guest Casey Stengel about the Yankees' batting order. When asked about how it went, Kell said, "Fine. But in our 15 minutes, Casey didn't get past the leadoff batter."

From 1958 to 1960, NBC aired a special regional feed of its games in the southeast, where the network had a different sponsor (such as National Bohemian beer) than for the rest of the country. This feed featured its own announcing team, with Chuck Thompson calling the games with Bill Veeck (1958) and Al Rosen (1959–60). NBC never had a true backup game until 1966, when the network got exclusivity for the Game of the Week. In the process, NBC brought in Curt Gowdy and Pee Wee Reese for the primary game, and Jim Simpson and Tony Kubek for the alternate game (which was always shown in the markets of teams playing in the primary game).

KTTV in Los Angeles aired the first regular-season baseball game ever played on the West Coast, a Los Angeles Dodgers-San Francisco Giants game from Seals Stadium in San Francisco, California, with Vin Scully announcing. In its first year airing Major League Baseball, KTTV aired only the Dodgers' road games.

=== 1959 ===
Jack Whitaker and Frankie Frisch announced the backup games on CBS from 1959 to 1961. They usually did games that took place in Philadelphia, New York City, Washington, D.C. or Baltimore. Whitaker once said in three years, he would only broadcast three innings because CBS would not switch away from Dizzy Dean. However, he said that he learned a lot of baseball just sitting next to Frisch. CBS had other backup crews for games featuring the Chicago Cubs and White Sox, Cleveland Indians and Cincinnati Reds. In these cases, Bob Finnegan would handle the play-by-play duties with various analysts depending on the city. CBS did not have Game of the Week rights from any other ballparks in those years.

What may be the first sports instant replay using videotape occurred on July 17, 1959, during a broadcast of a New York Yankees game by New York TV station WPIX. It came after a hit by Jim McAnany of the Chicago White Sox ended a no-hitter by the Yankees' Ralph Terry. Since the game was being videotaped, broadcaster Mel Allen asked director Terry Murphy to play a tape of McAnany's hit over the air.

In 1959 ABC broadcast the best-of-three playoff series (to decide the National League pennant) between the Milwaukee Braves and Los Angeles Dodgers. The cigarette company L&M was in charge of all of the telecasts. George Kell and Bob DeLaney were the announcers.

Chicago White Sox announcer Bob Elson missed a chance to call the 1959 World Series – the White Sox' first since 1919, and Elson's first since 1943 – on NBC because the then head of NBC Sports, Tom Gallery (who incidentally, grew up on the same block as Elson) did not like him. Elson was, however, allowed to call the Series on the White Sox' radio flagship, WCFL.
