= Major League Baseball on Mutual =

Major League Baseball on Mutual was the de facto title of the Mutual Broadcasting System's (MBS) national radio coverage of Major League Baseball games. Mutual's coverage came about during the Golden Age of Radio in the 1930s, 1940s, and 1950s. During this period, television sports broadcasting was in its infancy, and radio was still the main form of broadcasting baseball. For many years, Mutual was the national radio broadcaster for baseball's All-Star Game and World Series.

== History of coverage ==
Mutual started its baseball coverage in 1935, when the network joined NBC and CBS in national radio coverage. The three networks continued to share coverage of baseball's "jewels" (the All-Star Game and World Series) in this manner through 1938, with Mutual gaining exclusive rights to the World Series in 1939 and the All-Star Game in 1942. In 1949, Commissioner Happy Chandler negotiated a seven-year, US$4,370,000 contract with the Gillette Safety Razor Company and the Mutual Broadcasting System for radio rights to the World Series, with the proceeds going directly into the pension fund. In 1957, NBC replaced Mutual as the exclusive national radio broadcaster for the World Series and All-Star Game.

Following the lead of the rival Liberty Broadcasting System, Mutual also aired regular-season Game of the Day broadcasts (a precursor to television's Game of the Week concept) to non-major-league cities throughout the 1940s and 1950s.

=== Attempts at television coverage ===
In 1950, Mutual acquired the television broadcast rights to the World Series and All-Star Game for the next six years. The network may have been re-indulging in TV network dreams or simply taking advantage of a long-standing business relationship; in either case, the broadcast rights were sold to NBC in time for the following season's games at an enormous profit.

== Announcers ==
=== Game of the Day ===
- Rex Barney (1956)
- Bud Blattner (1952; 1954)
- Dizzy Dean (1951–1952)
- Don Dunphy (1944–1959)
- Gene Elston (1958–1960)
- Bob Feller (1958)
- Bob Fulton (1954)
- Art Gleeson (1950–1958)
- Al Helfer (1950–1954)
- Gene Kirby (1950–1952)
- France Laux (1939–1941; 1944)
- John MacLean (1955–1960)
- Bob Neal (1955–1956)
- Mel Ott (1955)
- Van Patrick (1960)
- Hal Totten (1945–1950)
- Joe Wilson (1952, 1959)
- Bob Wolff (1950–1951)

=== World Series ===
==== 1950s ====
Year	Play-by-play	Pregame host
1956	Bob Wolff and Bob Neal	Bill Corum
1955	Al Helfer and Bob Neal	Frankie Frisch
1954	Al Helfer and Jimmy Dudley	Frankie Frisch
1953	Al Helfer and Gene Kelly	Bill Corum
1952	Al Helfer and Jack Brickhouse	Bill Corum
1951	Mel Allen and Al Helfer	
1950	Mel Allen and Gene Kelly	Al Helfer

==== 1940s ====
Year	Play-by-play	Pregame host
1949	Mel Allen and Red Barber	
1948†	Mel Allen and Jim Britt	
1947	Mel Allen and Red Barber	
1946	Jim Britt and Arch McDonald	Bill Corum
1945	Bill Slater and Al Helfer	Bill Corum
1944	Bill Slater and Don Dunphy	Bill Corum
1943	Red Barber and Bob Elson	Bill Corum
1942	Red Barber and Mel Allen	Bill Corum
1941	Red Barber and Bob Elson	Bill Corum
1940	Red Barber and Bob Elson	Mel Allen

† Mutual also broadcast the 1948 American League tie-breaker game nationally. However, the network's coverage did not air in Cleveland due to Indians owner Bill Veeck refusing to grant permission to Mutual affiliate WHK after MLB commissioner Happy Chandler selected Mel Allen for its Series coverage instead of either Cleveland announcer. Indians flagship WJW originated coverage of its own for the tie-breaker game.

==== 1930s ====
Year	Play-by-play	Color commentator(s)
1939	Red Barber and Bob Elson	
1938	Bob Elson	Quin Ryan, David Driscoll and Stan Lomax
1937	Bob Elson and Johnny O'Hara	David Driscoll
1936	Bob Elson	Gabriel Heatter and Tony Wakeman
1935	Bob Elson and Red Barber	Quin Ryan

=== All-Star Game ===
==== 1950s ====
Year	Play-by-play	Color commentator(s)	Venue/Host team
1956	Bob Neal	Bob Wolff	Griffith Stadium, Washington Senators
1955	Bob Neal	Earl Gillespie	County Stadium, Milwaukee Braves
1954	Jim Dudley	Al Helfer	Municipal Stadium, Cleveland Indians
1953	Al Helfer	Waite Hoyt	Crosley Field, Cincinnati Reds
1952	Al Helfer	Gene Kelly	Shibe Park, Philadelphia Phillies
1951	Al Helfer	Mel Allen	Briggs Stadium, Detroit Tigers
1950	Mel Allen	Jim Britt	Comiskey Park, Chicago White Sox

==== 1940s ====
Year	Play-by-play	Color commentator(s)	Venue/Host team
1949	Mel Allen	Jim Britt	Ebbets Field, Brooklyn Dodgers
1948	Mel Allen	Jim Britt and France Laux	Sportsman's Park, St. Louis Browns
1947	Mel Allen	Jim Britt	Wrigley Field, Chicago Cubs
1946	Mel Allen	Jim Britt and Bill Corum	Fenway Park, Boston Red Sox
1945	Not held because of World War II		
1944	Don Dunphy	Bill Slater and Bill Corum	Forbes Field, Pittsburgh Pirates
1943	Mel Allen	Red Barber and Bill Corum	Shibe Park, Philadelphia Athletics
1942	Mel Allen	Jim Britt and Bob Elson	Polo Grounds, New York Giants
1941	Red Barber	Bob Elson	Briggs Stadium, Detroit Tigers
1940	Red Barber	Bob Elson	Sportsman's Park, St. Louis Cardinals

Two nights following the 1942 All-Star Game, the American League All-Stars traveled to Cleveland Municipal Stadium in Cleveland, Ohio, to play a special benefit game against a team of players from the U.S. Army and Navy. The contest, which the American Leaguers won 5–0, attracted a crowd of 62,094 and netted $70,000 for the Army Emergency Relief Fund and the Navy Relief Society. Mutual Radio broadcast the second game, with Bob Elson, Waite Hoyt, and Jack Graney announcing.

==== 1930s ====
Year	Play-by-play	Color Commentator(s)	Venue/Host team
1939	Red Barber	Bob Elson	Yankee Stadium, New York Yankees
1938	Bob Elson	Dick Bray	Crosley Field, Cincinnati Reds
1937	Mel Allen	Jim Britt	Griffith Stadium, Washington Senators
1936	Fred Hoey	Linus Travers	National League Park, Boston Bees
1935	Bob Elson	Eddie Vander Pyl	Municipal Stadium, Cleveland Indians
