= Major League Baseball on Compass Media Networks =

Major League Baseball on Compass Media Networks was a weekly presentation of Major League Baseball games (specifically, Saturday games involving the Los Angeles Angels of Anaheim) on the Compass Media radio network. For the 2013 season, Compass acquired rights to select Tampa Bay Rays home games to increase their MLB coverage.

== Background ==
On May 15, 2012, the Los Angeles Angels of Anaheim signed a radio rights deal with syndicator Compass Media to distribute 25 games to a nationwide audience, in a game-of-the-week format. These games would be produced separately from the KLAA broadcasts, and would feature veteran play-by-play men Chris Carrino and Steve Quis, with former New York Mets general manager and current SiriusXM sports talk show host Steve Phillips and former MLB player Darryl Hamilton as color commentators.

=== Affiliates ===
Many of the games, if not all, would air on such stations as WFAN New York City (radio flagship of the Mets), WTEM Washington, D.C. (a Baltimore Orioles affiliate), WQXI Atlanta, WYGM Orlando, and KFNC Houston, WHK in Cleveland, and KNEW in San Francisco.

== See also ==
- List of Los Angeles Angels of Anaheim broadcasters
- List of Tampa Bay Rays broadcasters
