= Joe Davis (sportscaster) =

American sportscaster (born 1987)

- Born: Joseph Daniel Davis; December 6, 1987 (age 38); Lansing, Michigan, U.S.
- Education: Beloit College
- Occupation: Sportscaster
- Years active: 2006–present
- Spouse: Libby (m. 2013)
- Children: 3
- Sports commentary career
- Teams: Schaumburg Flyers (2009); Montgomery Biscuits (2010–12); Los Angeles Dodgers (2016–present)
- Genre: Play-by-play
- Sports: Major League Baseball; NFL football; Basketball
- Employer: Comcast Sports Southeast (2010–12); ESPN (2012–14); Fox Sports (2014–present); Spectrum SportsNet LA/Los Angeles Dodgers (2016–present); NFL Network (2020–21)

Joseph Daniel Davis (born December 6, 1987) is an American sportscaster who serves as the lead play-by-play announcer for Los Angeles Dodgers telecasts on Spectrum SportsNet LA. He also calls national MLB and NFL telecasts for Fox Sports and has broadcast other pro and college sports for various teams and networks during his career. Since 2022, he has been the main play-by-play broadcaster for the annual World Series and MLB All-Star Game on Fox.

== Early years ==
Davis grew up in Potterville, Michigan, and graduated from Beloit College in 2010 with a degree in communications and journalism.

== Broadcasting career ==
Davis started his professional career calling football, basketball, baseball and hockey for ESPN and was formerly the voice of the Montgomery Biscuits. From 2010 to 2012, Davis called college football, basketball, and baseball for Comcast Sports Southeast and served as a studio host for the Baylor ISP Network for the Baylor Bears and called NCAA Division III football and basketball for D3Sports.com. For one season, Joe was the lead voice of the 2009 Illinois High School Volleyball State Championships and was the manager of broadcasting and media as well as calling games for the Schaumburg Flyers. His past work includes Beloit College basketball (men's and women's) and baseball as well as fill-in work for the Loyola Ramblers men's volleyball and women's basketball. He also called Sun Belt football and basketball for the Sun Belt Network. In 2012, he worked college football for ESPN, including the memorable Texas A&M win over Louisiana Tech with Johnny Manziel.

=== Fox Sports, NFL Network and FS1 (2014–present) ===
In July 2014, Davis was hired by Fox Sports, where he called college football and basketball, plus Major League Baseball and select National Football League games for Fox and FS1. Davis has handled Division Series broadcasts on Fox/FS1 and filled in on Game 4 of the 2019 American League Championship Series while Joe Buck called Thursday Night Football the same evening. Davis also filled in on Game 7 of the 2020 National League Championship Series while Buck called an NFL on Fox game between the Tampa Bay Buccaneers and the Green Bay Packers. Later that year, Davis replaced Mike Tirico on the NFL Network broadcast of a Saturday night game between the Carolina Panthers and the Green Bay Packers after Tirico was dispatched to fill-in for Al Michaels on NBC Sunday Night Football, and would fulfill the same role in 2021. Also in 2021, Davis filled in on an NFL on Fox game between the Tampa Bay Buccaneers and the New Orleans Saints while Buck called Game 5 of the World Series between the Atlanta Braves and the Houston Astros. For the 2022 MLB season, after Buck left Fox for ESPN, Davis was named his full-time replacement for MLB on Fox. Later that year, Davis was selected to be Fox’s new #2 play-by-play man for their NFL coverage, replacing Kevin Burkhardt, who became Buck’s replacement on their #1 NFL crew, with Greg Olsen as his color commentator as of the 2024 season. Thus far, his most memorable baseball calls were Bryce Harper’s home run in Game 5 of the NLCS in 2022 (“Harper, the swing of his life!”), Yordan Alvarez’s go-ahead home run in Game 6 of the 2022 World Series (“This game has turned upside down!”), Adolis García’s walk-off home run in Game 1 of the 2023 World Series (“And the legend grows!”), Freddie Freeman's walk-off grand slam in Game 1 of the 2024 World Series (“She is gone!”), and the final outs of Game 5 of the 2024 World Series and Game 7 of the 2025 World Series.

For his work on Fox and FS1, Davis was awarded a Sports Emmy Award for Outstanding Play-by-Play Personality in 2025.

=== Los Angeles Dodgers (2016–present) ===
In November 2015, Davis was hired by SportsNet LA to serve as an alternate play-by-play commentator for the Los Angeles Dodgers during the 2016 season. He split the play-by-play role with Charley Steiner for games that were not called by Vin Scully, who would be retiring as the team's television broadcaster at the end of the season. Davis subsequently became Scully's successor for the 2017 season, alongside Orel Hershiser on color. In interviews, Davis stated that he did not plan to entirely emulate Vin Scully's style, use his catchphrases, or be viewed as a "replacement" of him, arguing that one cannot "replace the greatest anyone of all time in anything". He did, however, state that he wanted to maintain Scully's focus upon storytelling as a reminder of the traits of Scully. In regard to his transition to the role, Davis explained that "hopefully, some have listened and at least learned to tolerate me. But for my comfort level, last year was very important, and having Orel in the booth has been the best part, and biggest reason, for this being an enjoyable experience so far, personally and professionally. I'm eternally grateful to him for how he has gone out of his way." Since then, he has only called a maximum of 90 games per season for the club, limited by his other work calling national games.

When the Dodgers won back-to-back World Series titles in 2024 and 2025, it was Davis who made the call both times on Fox. He said in 2024: "Start the party, Los Angeles! Your Dodgers have won the World Series!" In 2025: "To beat the champ, you gotta knock 'em out! The Dodgers stand tall and win back-to-back titles!"

== Personal life ==
Davis resides in South Pasadena, California with his wife Libby (m. 2013) and three children: Charlotte, Blake and Theo. Theo's full given name is Theodore Orel, named in honor of Davis's colleague and friend, Orel Hershiser. The family is Catholic.

His brother, Sam A. Davis, is a filmmaker. In 2025, he directed and produced the short The Singers, which won an Academy Award for Best Live Action Short Film at the 98th Oscars. Joe was working the World Baseball Classic semifinal game between the United States and the Dominican Republic when Sam won.

== Career timeline ==
- 2022–present: NFL Divisional playoff game, NFL Wild Card playoff game, World Series, All-Star Game, and World Baseball Classic play-by-play on Fox Sports
- 2020–2021: NFL Network Saturday Special play-by-play
- 2017–present: MLB Postseason for FS1 play-by-play (Division Series and Championship Series)
- 2016–present: Los Angeles Dodgers on Spectrum SportsNet LA play-by-play
- 2015–present: NFL on Fox play-by-play (#2 play-by-play since 2022)
- 2014–present: MLB on Fox play-by-play (#1 play-by-play since 2022)
- 2014–2022: College basketball on Fox and FS1 play-by-play
- 2014–2021: College Football on Fox and FS1 play-by-play
- 2012–2014: College football, basketball, baseball, and hockey on ESPN play-by-play
- 2011–2012: College football, basketball, and baseball on Comcast Sports Southeast play-by-play
- 2010–2012: Montgomery Biscuits play-by-play
- 2010–2011: Baylor ISP Network Studio Host
- 2007–2010: D3Sports.com football and basketball play-by-play
- 2009: Illinois State High School Volleyball State Championships play-by-play on IHSA TV
- 2009: Schaumburg Flyers manager of broadcasting & media and play-by-play
- 2009: Loyola Ramblers men's volleyball and women's volleyball fill-in play-by-play
- 2006–2009 Beloit College baseball and basketball (men's and women's) play-by-play

Sporting positions
Preceded by Joe Buck	World Series network television play-by-play announcer 2022–present	Succeeded by Incumbent
Preceded by Joe Buck	Lead play-by-play announcer Major League Baseball Game of the Week; 2022–present	Succeeded by Incumbent
Preceded by Joe Buck	Lead play-by-play announcer Major League Baseball on Fox; 2022–present	Succeeded by Incumbent
