= Major League Baseball on CBS Radio =

- Other names: MLB on CBS Radio
- Genre: American baseball game broadcasts
- Running time: 210 minutes or until game ended (inc. adverts)
- Country of origin: United States
- Language: English
- Home station: CBS Radio Network
- Syndicates: List of broadcast stations owned by CBS Radio
- TV adaptations: Major League Baseball on CBS
- Starring: See commentators section below
- Created by: CBS Radio Sports
- Recording studio: Various MLB stadiums (game broadcasts)
- Original release: July 13, 1976 – October 26, 1997
- No. of series: 22
- Audio format: Stereophonic sound
- Website: CBS Radio Sports (Westwood One); MLB – CBSSports.com
- Podcast: AudioNet

Major League Baseball on CBS Radio was the de facto title for the CBS Radio Network's coverage of Major League Baseball. Produced by CBS Radio Sports, the program was the official national radio broadcaster for the All-Star Game and the postseason (including the World Series) from 1976 to 1997.

== History ==
Historically, the sports coverage now produced by Westwood One was branded as CBS Radio Sports and, like the news features, associated with the CBS Radio Network; however, after CBS began managing the original Westwood One in the mid-1990s, the sports broadcasts would come under the Westwood One banner (with both identities used in the late 1990s), a practice that would continue even after CBS stopped managing Westwood One in 2007. CBS launched a 24/7 sports radio network, CBS Sports Radio, in fall 2012 through Cumulus Media Networks, owned by Cumulus Media (Cumulus Media Networks was merged into Westwood One in 2013, following Cumulus' acquisition of Westwood One).

=== Contracts ===
CBS first broadcast Major League Baseball in the early days of network radio, sharing World Series coverage with NBC beginning in 1927 and All-Star Game coverage beginning in 1933. Mutual joined them in 1935; the three networks continued to share coverage of baseball's "jewel" events through 1938, with Mutual gaining exclusive rights to the World Series in 1939 and the All-Star Game in 1942. NBC, in turn, would have exclusivity for both events from 1957 through 1975.

In 1950, CBS Radio carried Saturday regular-season Brooklyn Dodgers home games played at Ebbets Field, simulcasting the team's local WMGM radio broadcasts with Red Barber and Connie Desmond announcing. The CBS simulcasts, which were sponsored by General Foods, were blacked out in major league cities but otherwise aired nationally.

From 1976–1979, CBS Radio paid US$75,000 per year for rights to the World Series, All-Star Game, and League Championship Series. In 1985 the network added regular-season Saturday Game of the Week broadcasts.

By 1990, CBS Television would get into the Major League Baseball broadcasting business (having last done so in 1965). This particular partnership would last through the 1993 season. Meanwhile, CBS Radio would pay Major League Baseball US$50 million for 1990–1993 radio rights to the Game of the Week and Sunday Night Baseball as well as the All-Star Game, League Championship Series, and World Series.

Following the 1993 season, CBS Radio signed a six-year contract worth US$50.5 million. Following the 1994 strike and the dissolving of "The Baseball Network" (a planned six-year-long television joint venture involving ABC, NBC and Major League Baseball), the television contracts had to be realigned. Ultimately, Major League Baseball on CBS Radio would last through the 1997 season before being succeeded by Major League Baseball on ESPN Radio.

=== The Game of the Week ===
In 1985, CBS Radio started broadcasting a weekly Game of the Week. CBS Radio usually did two games each Saturday, one on the afternoons and another during the evenings. Typically, CBS' markets aired only the afternoon broadcasts. The games covered varied from the ones NBC-TV were offering at the time to games outside of NBC's sight.

One notable exception was KCBS in San Francisco, which almost always carried the evening games. In 1994, just before the strike, KNBR carried the broadcasts in San Francisco and finally aired some of CBS' afternoon games. However, following the strike, KNBR dropped CBS' regular season broadcasts, and with the exception of 1995, when all playoff games were played at the same time, they usually only carried one or two Division Series games on days when there were three games played.

As previously mentioned, CBS Radio would also eventually follow ESPN television's suit, and broadcast Sunday night games (something ESPN started in 1990). John Rooney and Jerry Coleman usually called these games while Jim Hunter hosted the pregame show entitled Inside Pitch.

=== CBS Radio's local coverage ===
CBS Radio was the largest broadcaster of local Major League Baseball broadcasts. In 2005 and 2007 respectively, CBS dropped the St. Louis Cardinals from KMOX and the Pittsburgh Pirates from KDKA, ending two long relationships between the teams and their flagship stations. However, KMOX reacquired the Cardinals' broadcast rights in 2011, and KDKA's FM sister all-sports station acquired the Pirates' broadcast rights in 2012, in addition to New York Yankees games being renewed on WCBS after the conclusion of the 2011 season, they would have the rights until the end of the 2013 season.

CBS's WFAN is the flagship station of the New York Yankees (they had broadcast the Mets until 2014) and WSCR is the flagship station of the Chicago Cubs. In Philadelphia, WPHT, a frequency that had been the longtime home of the Philadelphia Phillies before parting ways after the 2001 season, reacquired the team's broadcast rights in 2005. As of 2012, those games are now simulcast on sister station WIP-FM. KRLD-FM in Dallas was the flagship station for the Texas Rangers before the 2011 season.

In 2015, the Chicago Cubs moved its radio broadcasts to CBS property WBBM (AM) from its longtime home of WGN (AM). That same year, the Baltimore Orioles began its second stint on all-sports WJZ-FM, four years after it was moved back to its traditional home of WBAL (AM). In 2016, the Cubs rights moved to sister station WSCR as part of a pre-arrangement in the 2015 agreement where WSCR would take over airing games after letting the rights to the Chicago White Sox go after the 2015 season (which now broadcast on WGN (AM)).

During the 2010s, at least seven teams were on stations owned by the company:

- Chicago White Sox (WSCR)
- Detroit Tigers (WXYT-FM)
- New York Mets (WFAN)
- New York Yankees (WCBS)
- Philadelphia Phillies (WPHT, but expected to move to WIP-FM as of 2012 season)
- Pittsburgh Pirates (KDKA-FM as of 2012 season, returning games to CBS Radio, but to a different station than longtime flagship KDKA)
- St. Louis Cardinals (KMOX; returned in 2011 after a two-year absence)

In addition, three teams had been on CBS-owned stations until the 2010–11 "hot stove" period:

- Baltimore Orioles (left WJZ-FM for WBAL)
- Oakland Athletics (left KFRC-FM for KYCY, then for non-owned KBWF/KGMZ just before Opening Day)
- Texas Rangers (left KRLD-FM for KESN)

== Commentators ==
=== The Game of the Week ===
From 1985–1993, the two announcers calling the games at hand split play-by-play duties. From 1994 until the end of its coverage in 1997, CBS Radio used Jeff Torborg and Al Downing (as well as Rick Cerone in 1997) as color analysts paired with the play-by-play announcers.

=== The Home Town Inning ===
The Home Town Inning, traditionally featuring a visiting team announcer calling the top of the fifth with the home team announcer calling the bottom of the fifth, was featured on CBS Radio postseason games from 1985–1986 and on regular season games from 1985–1997.

=== Full list of commentators ===
Play-by-play commentators included:

- Sparky Anderson (1979–1986) for the World Series
- Johnny Bench (1985–1993)
- Marty Brennaman (1976) for the World Series
- Jack Buck (1983–1989) for the World Series
- Joe Buck (1993–1995)
- Steve Busby (1987–1994)
- Gary Cohen (1986; 1994–1997)
- Jerry Coleman (1985–1997)
- Win Elliot (1976–1986) for the World Series
- Gene Elston (1987–1995)
- Steve Garvey (1990–1992)
- Curt Gowdy (1985–1986)
- Hank Greenwald (1997)
- Ernie Harwell (1992–1997)
- Jim Hunter (1986–1996)
- Frank Messer (1990–1992)
- Bob Murphy (1985–1986; 1988)
- Brent Musburger (1985–1989)
- Lindsey Nelson (1985–1986)
- Ross Porter (1977–1978) for the World Series
- John Rooney (1985–1997)
- Vin Scully (1979–1982; 1990–1997) for the World Series
- Jeff Torborg (1995–1997) for the World Series
- Bill White (1976–1989)

Other commentators (roughly in order of first appearance) included:

1. Dick Stockton
2. Howard David
3. Ted Robinson
4. Charlie Slowes
5. Tom Kelly
6. Joel Meyers
7. Tommy Hutton
8. Ron Fairly
9. Joe Torre
10. Lee Mazzilli
11. George Grande
12. Jerry Trupiano – Trupiano called three games on the CBS Radio Game of the Week in 1991
13. Joe Magrane
14. Billy Sample
15. Spencer Ross
16. Al Downing
17. Rick Cerone
18. Steve Mason

=== All-Star Game commentators ===
==== 1990s ====
Year	Play-by-play	Color commentator(s)	Venue/Host team
1997	John Rooney	Jerry Coleman and Jeff Torborg	Jacobs Field, Cleveland Indians
1996	John Rooney	Jim Hunter	Veterans Stadium, Philadelphia Phillies
1995	John Rooney	Jerry Coleman and Jeff Torborg	The Ballpark in Arlington, Texas Rangers
1994	John Rooney	Jerry Coleman and Jeff Torborg	Three Rivers Stadium, Pittsburgh Pirates
1993	John Rooney	Jerry Coleman and Johnny Bench	Oriole Park at Camden Yards, Baltimore Orioles
1992	John Rooney	Jerry Coleman and Johnny Bench	Jack Murphy Stadium, San Diego Padres
1991	John Rooney	Jerry Coleman and Johnny Bench	SkyDome, Toronto Blue Jays
1990	John Rooney	Jerry Coleman and Johnny Bench	Wrigley Field, Chicago Cubs

==== 1980s ====
Year	Play-by-play	Color commentator(s)	Venue/Host team
1989	Brent Musburger	Jerry Coleman and Johnny Bench	Anaheim Stadium, California Angels
1988	Brent Musburger	Jerry Coleman and Johnny Bench	Riverfront Stadium, Cincinnati Reds
1987	Brent Musburger	Jerry Coleman and Johnny Bench	Oakland–Alameda County Coliseum, Oakland Athletics
1986	Brent Musburger	Jerry Coleman and Johnny Bench	Astrodome, Houston Astros
1985	Brent Musburger	Jerry Coleman and Johnny Bench	Hubert H. Humphrey Metrodome, Minnesota Twins
1984	Brent Musburger	Jerry Coleman and Johnny Bench	Candlestick Park, San Francisco Giants
1983	Brent Musburger	Duke Snider and Brooks Robinson	Comiskey Park, Chicago White Sox
1982	Vin Scully	Brent Musburger	Olympic Stadium, Montreal Expos
1981	Vin Scully	Win Elliot and Herb Score	Cleveland Stadium, Cleveland Indians
1980	Vin Scully	Brent Musburger	Dodger Stadium, Los Angeles Dodgers

==== 1970s ====
Year	Play-by-play	Color commentator(s)	Venue/Host team
1979	Vin Scully	Brent Musburger and Jerry Coleman	Kingdome, Seattle Mariners
1978	Vin Scully	Brent Musburger and Jerry Coleman	San Diego Stadium, San Diego Padres
1977	Vin Scully	Brent Musburger	Yankee Stadium, New York Yankees
1976	Jack Buck	Brent Musburger and Andy Musser	Veterans Stadium, Philadelphia Phillies

=== Tie-breaker game commentators ===
Year	Play-by-play	Color commentator
1978 AL East	Ernie Harwell	Win Elliot
1980 NL West	Lindsey Nelson	Jerry Coleman
1995 AL West	Ernie Harwell	Al Downing

=== Division Series and League Championship Series commentators ===
- Johnny Bench (1985–1993)
- Jack Buck (1979–1982)
- Gary Cohen (League Championship Series: 1988–1991; 1995-1997; 1996 American League Division Series (Yankees–Rangers))
- Jerry Coleman (1976–1983; 1985, 1988–1993; 1995–1997)
- Gene Elston (1995–1997)
- Curt Gowdy (1980–1981; 1983; 1985–1986)
- Ernie Harwell (American League Championship Series: 1976–1983; 1985–1986; 1993; American League Division Series: 1995–1997)
- Ralph Kiner (1976–1978)
- Hank Greenwald (1997)
- Harry Kalas (1984)
- Ned Martin (1976–1978; 1981)
- Denny Matthews (1982)
- Brent Musburger (1986)
- John Rooney (League Championship Series: 1987–1993; 1995–1997; Division Series: 1995–1997)
- Ross Porter (1984)
- Jeff Torborg (League Championship Series: 1995–1997; Division Series: 1995–1997)
- Bill White (1976–1979; 1984–1985; 1987–1988)

Jim Hunter called the American League Championship Series alongside Johnny Bench from 1990–1992. In 1993, Hunter teamed Ernie Harwell to call the ALCS. And in 1995 and 1996 respectively, Hunter called the National League Division Series and National League Championship Series alongside Jerry Coleman. In 1996, Hunter called the American League Division Series between the New York Yankees and Texas Rangers with Gary Cohen.

Ernie Harwell was also on the call for the 1995 American League Division Series between the Seattle Mariners and New York Yankees alongside color commentator Al Downing. The following is Harwell's description of the game winning double for the Mariners as hit by Edgar Martínez in Game 5.

The pitch...SWING...base hit, left field! Here comes Cora, he'll score. Here comes Griffey, rounding third. He's being waved home! Here comes the relay...from Fernández! SLIDES...and the Mariners win it in the 11th inning on a base hit by Edgar Martínez! A thrilling finish and they will battle the Cleveland Indians for the American League championship! The final score, Seattle 6 and the Yankees 5! You're listening to the Division Series from CBS Radio Sports!

=== World Series commentators ===
==== 1990s ====
Year	Play-by-play	Color commentator	Pregame host
1997	Vin Scully	Jeff Torborg	John Rooney
1996	Vin Scully	Jeff Torborg	John Rooney
1995	Vin Scully	Jeff Torborg	John Rooney
1993	Vin Scully	Johnny Bench	John Rooney
1992	Vin Scully	Johnny Bench	John Rooney
1991	Vin Scully	Johnny Bench	John Rooney
1990	Vin Scully	Johnny Bench	John Rooney

==== 1980s ====
Year	Play-by-play	Color commentator	Pregame host
1989	Jack Buck	Johnny Bench	John Rooney
1988	Jack Buck	Bill White	John Rooney
1987	Jack Buck	Bill White	John Rooney
1986	Jack Buck	Sparky Anderson	Win Elliot
1985	Jack Buck	Sparky Anderson	Win Elliot
1984	Jack Buck	Brent Musburger	Win Elliot
1983	Jack Buck	Sparky Anderson	Win Elliot
1982	Vin Scully	Sparky Anderson	Win Elliot
1981	Vin Scully	Sparky Anderson	Win Elliot
1980	Vin Scully	Sparky Anderson	Win Elliot

==== 1970s ====
Year	Play-by-play	Color commentator	Pregame host(s)
1979	Vin Scully	Sparky Anderson	Win Elliot
1978	Bill White and Ross Porter	Win Elliot	Jerry Coleman and Ralph Kiner
1977	Ross Porter and Bill White	Win Elliot	Ralph Kiner and Jerry Coleman
1976	Bill White and Marty Brennaman	Win Elliot	Bill Sorrell and Brent Musburger

When CBS Radio took over World Series rights from NBC Radio in 1976, they continued the old practice of having the local team announcers do the play-by-play for the World Series games in the road market of that home team's broadcasters through 1978. Thus, Bill White got call do all three World Series involving the New York Yankees on CBS Radio from 1976–1978 and Ross Porter with the Los Angeles Dodgers in 1977–1978. In addition, CBS Radio used Marty Brennaman in 1976, when his Cincinnati Reds played against White's Yankees.

In 1977, Bill White did CBS Radio play-by-play for the games in Los Angeles while Ross Porter handled the games played in New York. Thus, when White was working on ABC-TV during that series, it was during the home games in a pre/postgame role (White would eventually cover the trophy presentation ceremony for ABC). Likewise, Ross Porter handled White's TV role while in Los Angeles. From 1976–1978, Win Elliot was always in the booth either as a host or color man but never he did play-by-play for CBS Radio's World Series coverage. Elliot was in a sense, the designated "network" participant on the broadcasts since he hosted the CBS Sports Roundup and other events for CBS Radio like horse racing events. Meanwhile, Ralph Kiner served as the pre and postgame host. In New York, the 1977 World Series was carried by two radio stations, WCBS and the Yankees' then flagship station, WMCA. WCMA simply carried the same CBS feed as did WCBS since separate radio broadcasts with the local announcers wouldn't begin until 1984.

In 1979, CBS Radio, following the lead begun by ABC's television coverage in 1977, dropped the usage of the local broadcasters on play-by-play. They stopped using local announcers altogether when Vin Scully began doing the World Series as a CBS employee through 1982. (Beginning in 1981, however, participating teams' flagship radio stations were permitted to produce their own local World Series broadcasts and air them live. The affiliate stations in the teams' radio networks continued to be obligated to carry the CBS Radio broadcasts.)

During the 1980 World Series, thousands of Philadelphia Phillies fans were outraged that they could not hear their local team announcers call the games. They deluged the team, the networks, and the Commissioner's office with angry letters and petitions. The following year Major League Baseball changed its broadcast contract to allow the flagship radio stations for participating World Series teams to produce and air their own local Series broadcasts, beginning in 1982. The CBS Radio feed could potentially be heard in those markets on another station which held CBS's rights. WPHL did a "re-creation" of the game with Harry Kalas, Richie Ashburn, and Andy Musser using the NBC video, which aired in November along with the National League East division clinching game in Montreal and three games from the NLCS against Houston. When the Phillies next won a World Series, in 2008, Kalas was able to make the call of the final out.

After the 1982 season, Scully left CBS altogether to do baseball play-by-play for NBC on television (a role that he had through the end of the 1989 season). In Vin Scully's absence, came Jack Buck, who would call the World Series for CBS Radio from 1983 through 1989.

In 1985, KMOX, the St. Louis Cardinals' flagship station at the time, simulcast with CBS Radio's World Series coverage involving the Cardinals. That was mainly because Jack Buck had a lengthy career calling Cardinals games for KMOX to go along with his national work for CBS Radio.

In 1990, Buck would move over to CBS-TV to call the World Series and Scully returned to CBS Radio to take his place following NBC's loss of television rights. Scully would continue to call the World Series on through 1997 (CBS' last before the contract moved to ESPN Radio).

== World Series moments ==
=== 1985 World Series ===
Despite his long and illustrious career, Don Denkinger is probably best remembered for a blown call he made at first base in Game 6 of the 1985 World Series, played on October 26. The St. Louis Cardinals led the Kansas City Royals by 3 games to 2. The Cardinals had taken a 1-0 lead in the 8th inning on a single by little-used backup catcher Brian Harper after pitchers Danny Cox (of the Cardinals) and Charlie Leibrandt (of the Royals) had battled back and forth all game long. Todd Worrell came into the game for the Cardinals in the 9th inning, first facing Jorge Orta, the leadoff batter for the Royals. Orta hit a slow roller to first baseman Jack Clark, who tossed to Worrell covering first base.

Denkinger was the umpire at first base and called Orta safe, even though television replays and photographs clearly showed that he was out by half a step. The Cardinals argued briefly, but Denkinger refused to reverse it. The Royals went on to win Game 6 by the score of 2-1.

Orta, leading off, swings and hits it to the right side, and the pitcher has to cover he is...SAFE, SAFE, SAFE, and we'll have an argument! Sparky, I think he was out!

— CBS Radio Sports announcer Jack Buck (alongside Sparky Anderson) calling Don Denkinger's blown call in Game 6.

He had the base and he had the ball, man, what else is there? That's the rule, isn't it?

— Jack Buck

=== 1986 World Series ===
The following is a word-for-word transcript of Jack Buck and Sparky Anderson's commentary during the final moments of Game 6 of the 1986 World Series:

- J = Jack Buck
- S = Sparky Anderson

J: Mookie Wilson is the batter...he has a hit...one out of three...a switch hitter, he'll bat left. Moments ago, the Red Sox were one strike away. Now they're one out away. Here's the pitch...and a foul strike one...back into the seats and Wilson wasn't taking. Howard Johnson is on deck, we mentioned earlier he stayed in the game.

S: Mookie's not bashful, he's not afraid to swing this bat. He's not concerned right now...he wants a base hit.

J: Next pitch from Stanley is a ball and it's one and one...they hold against Ray Knight, he is not a threat to steal. The batter is Mookie Wilson, one ball one strike, two on, two out...way high ball two, as Stanley slipped coming of the pitching rubber. The on deck batter is Howard Johnson and this thing, this game has been at the finish line three or four times. 5-4 Boston, bottom half of the tenth inning, 5-4, first and third two out, and a foul puts Boston within a strike of the title again. It evens the count to Mookie Wilson, that ball in on him, two and two.

S: Don't be surprised if you see his palmball right here.

J: First and third. Tying run at third, winning run at first, two out, the pitch! a swing and a...foul tip, he just got a piece of it and that's how close Boston was to nailing it down. A foul by Mookie Wilson keeps him up there. two balls two strikes. The Mets have scored here in the tenth, they trail 5-4 trying to send us into tomorrow night. Here's the pitch! Swing and a foul, back and out of play and Wilson hammered at one outside, in the strike zone I think, stays 2-2. Mitchell the tying run at third, a base hit ties it for New York, a long one could win it, a home run would win it, the pitch! Ball three! Wild pitch! We're gonna be tied! The ball went off the glove of the catcher. We're 5-5 in the bottom of the tenth. Unbelievable, it's 5-5 and now the winning run is at second with two out. A breaking ball handcuffed Gedman, a breaking ball handcuffed the catcher and Mitchell raced home with the tying run and Mookie Wilson could win it here. They have a base open and Howard Johnson up next. That run charged to Schiraldi. The 3-2 pitch on the way, swing and a high pop foul going out of play. And it gives everybody a chance to collect their collective breath as the Mets have scored two here in the tenth after scoring a run in the eighth to pull it out of the bag again.

S: Boy if this don't remind you of that California Angels-Boston series, nothing will...

J: And a full count on Mookie Wilson, he can win it with a hit. Ray Knight is at second base. Here's the pitch! Swing and a foul out of play, and I'll tell you this folks. If the Mets win this tonight, man, there will be no holding them tomorrow, Dennis Boyd or no Dennis Boyd.

S: They'll come out here looking like they're on stilts.

J: It stays three and two, let's look ahead to the Boston eleventh inning. Evans will lead it off. Isn't this unbelievable. A couple of times Boston was a strike away from winning. You remember that little foul tip just before? What did they call it? Wild pitch or passed ball?

S: I think they called it a wild pitch.

J: Wild pitch. Here's the pitch to Mookie Wilson. Winning run at second. Ground ball to first, it is a run...an error! An error by Buckner! The winning run scores! The Mets win it 6 to 5 with three in the tenth! The ball went right through the legs of Buckner and the Mets with two men out and nobody on have scored three times to bring about a seventh game, which will be played here tomorrow night. Folks, it was unbelievable. An error, right through the legs of Buckner. There were two on, nobody out, a single by Carter, a single by Mitchell, a single by Ray Knight, a wild pitch, an error by Buckner. Three in the ninth for the Mets. They've won the game 6-5 and we shall play here... tomorrow night! Well, open up the history book, folks, we've got an entry for you...What do you think, Sparky?

S: I never seen nothing like it. Here you got two out, two run lead, you figure Carter up, he can't even hurt you. He gets a base hit, another base hit, another base hit...wild pitches, ball rolls through the guys legs. I've never seen nothing like it, Jack.

J: It will be Boyd against Darling tomorrow night.

S: Yogi Berra is the greatest human being who ever lived. He said, it's not over 'til it's over.

J: This game is now history and it deserves its own page...

=== 1988 World Series ===
For CBS Radio's coverage of the 1988 World Series, Jack Buck provided play-by-play while Bill White served as the analyst. This was Buck's call of the final moments of Game 1. It begins here with Buck speculating on what might happen if Kirk Gibson manages to reach base: "... then you would run for Gibson and have Sax batting. But, we have a big 3-2 pitch coming here from Eckersley. Gibson swings, and a fly ball to deep right field! This is gonna be a home run! Unbelievable! A home run for Gibson! And the Dodgers have won the game, 5 to 4; I don't believe what I just saw!"

The last sentence is often remembered and quoted by fans. Buck followed it with, "I don't believe what I just saw! Is this really happening, Bill?"

Moments after Kirk Gibson's home run, Jack Buck told his listeners, "I've seen a lot of dramatic finishes, in a lot of sports, but this one might top almost every other one."

=== 1989 World Series ===
On October 17, 1989, commentators Jack Buck, Johnny Bench and John Rooney, were on hand at San Francisco's Candlestick Park for Game 3 of the World Series between the San Francisco Giants and Oakland Athletics. At 5:04 p.m. local time, the Loma Prieta earthquake hit (and subsequently caused a ten-day delay for the World Series). Unlike ABC-Television (with Al Michaels, Jim Palmer and Tim McCarver calling the action on the TV side), CBS Radio was in a commercial break when the earthquake struck. After the earthquake hit, Jack Buck told the listening audience, "I must say about Johnny Bench, folks, if he moved that fast when he played, he would have never hit into a double play. I never saw anybody move that fast in my life."

=== 1991 World Series ===
On October 27, 1991, Vin Scully, along with Johnny Bench and John Rooney, was on hand for a game considered by fans to be one of the most intense in the sport's history. Game 7 of the already exciting World Series (between the Minnesota Twins and Atlanta Braves) was scoreless going into the ninth inning, and an emotionally drained Scully said, "After eight full innings of play, Atlanta nothing, Minnesota nothing... I think we'll be back in just a moment." In the bottom of the tenth inning, Gene Larkin won the game for the Twins with a high fly-ball into left field (which allowed Dan Gladden to score) off Alejandro Peña.

The following is Scully's description of the final moments of Game 7:

Peña, right foot on the rubber. You can taste the pressure here in the 'Dome as Alejandro straightens up. And the pitch to Larkin. Swung on—a high fly ball into left center! The run will score, the ball will bounce for a single, and the Minnesota Twins are the champions of the world!

The day prior, this is how Scully described Kirby Puckett's game winning home run to send the 1991 World Series to a seventh and decisive game in the first place:

And the two-one pitch to the Minnesota centerfielder is driven to deep left-centerfield, back goes Keith Mitchell... it is gone, home run Puckett! And Charlie Leibrandt has turned the lights out of the Metrodome... again! Kirby Puckett with a single, a triple, a scoring flyball, and a game winning home run against Charlie Leibrandt. The final score in 11 innings, Minnesota 4, Atlanta 3!

=== 1996 World Series ===
During his CBS Radio broadcast in 1996, Vin Scully made another memorable call in the third inning of Game 1, when 19-year-old rookie outfielder Andruw Jones became the first National League player to hit two home runs in his first two at-bats in a World Series.

Jones hits this one to left field, wa-a-ay back, the kid has hit another one!

=== 1997 World Series ===
For CBS Radio's final World Series to date, the seventh and decisive game between the Florida Marlins and Cleveland Indians went into the bottom of the 11th inning with the score tied 2–2. This is how Vin Scully described the final moments of that game:

Lot of nail-biting now as Nagy comes back and there's a line drive behind second base, base hit and the Marlins have won it! And they are crazy at Pro Player Park! Édgar Rentería, a line drive base hit to centerfield and the Marlins...the fastest expansion team to win a championship. They did it in five years, the Mets took eight. And the Marlins came in here as a wild card to win it all!

Before CBS Radio signed off from their baseball coverage for the final time on October 26, 1997, Vin Scully and Jeff Torborg delivered this final message to listeners:

Vin Scully: Tonight's game sponsored by CBS television, by Countrywide Home Loans, by Horrick, and by the U.S. Army. Our producer Norman Baer, our engineers Stem Gehan and Sam Carroll, our studio coordinator Andrew Holmlund, our PR reference has been John Ralph of the Baseball Hall of Fame, and assisting us in the booth, Dale Torborg. Once again the final score from Miami, the Marlins 3, Cleveland 2. This will be our last broadcast for CBS. Jeff, I must tell you what an absolute delight and pleasure it has been to sit here and share the broadcast with you, you're outstanding.

Jeff Torborg: Vin, coming from you that means a great deal. You are not only a Hall of Fame announcer, you are more than a Hall of Fame person. And I, I respect you so much and so grateful that we have a friendship and have that for a lot of years, thank you.

Scully: If we never work together I will never forget these years and thank you. I'd like to thank John Rooney, who is indeed a part of the group and to our loyal producer Norman Baer, whose done such a great job over the years. And for us that figures to wrap up our World Series work for CBS. So once again the final score, Marlins 3, Cleveland 2. The Marlins are the World Champions. Our congratulations to both teams.

Records
Preceded by NBC	Major League Baseball national radio broadcast partner 1976–1997	Succeeded by ESPN
