= Gene Kelly (broadcaster) =

American sportscaster (1918–1979)

Gene Kelly (born Eugene K. Sims; October 6, 1918 – September 18, 1979) was an American sportscaster, best known as a play-by-play announcer for Major League Baseball's Philadelphia Phillies during the 1950s.

== Early life ==
Kelly was born Eugene K. Sims in Brooklyn, New York on October 6, 1918. He attended Marshall University, graduating in 1941. After graduating Kelly signed a Class C contract with the Brooklyn Dodgers, but arm trouble prevented him from continuing as a player. During World War II, he served in the U.S. Army Air Forces.

== Career ==
Originally, By Saam was the primary play-by-play announcer for both the Philadelphia A's and Philadelphia Phillies, which was possible because only home games were broadcast live, and the A's and Phillies shared Shibe Park and thus were never at home at the same time. When the broadcasters began to travel with the teams to road games beginning in the 1950 season, a second announcer was needed. Saam chose to remain with the A's, and Kelly, who had previously worked in Indianapolis as sports editor of WIBC (where he also called Indianapolis Indians games) and general manager of WXLW, became the Phillies' announcer. Over the next decade, his broadcast partners included Saam (who returned to the Phillies in 1955 when the A's moved to Kansas City), Claude Haring, Bill Brundige, and George Walsh. Nationally, Kelly helped call the 1950 World Series, 1952 All-Star Game, and 1953 World Series on Mutual radio and the 1954 All-Star Game on NBC television.

The Phillies fired Kelly after the 1959 season. He then moved to Cincinnati to broadcast Cincinnati Reds games in 1962–63. At various times during his career he was a football announcer for the St. Louis Cardinals, Big Ten, Notre Dame and Ivy League, and he also called the Indianapolis 500 auto race and Philadelphia Warriors basketball games.

== Death ==
Kelly had a stroke at his home in Merion, Pennsylvania and died on September 18, 1979.
