= Gene Elston =

American sports broadcaster (1922–2015)

- Born: Robert Gene Elston; March 26, 1922; Fort Dodge, Iowa, U.S.
- Died: September 5, 2015 (aged 93); Houston, Texas, U.S.
- Occupation: Sportscaster
- Years active: 1954–1997

Robert Gene Elston (March 26, 1922 – September 5, 2015) was an American Major League Baseball (MLB) broadcaster, primarily with the Houston Astros.

== Early life and career ==
A native of Fort Dodge, Iowa, Elston was born on March 26, 1922. He started work in 1940 with the radio station KVFD. He did baseball and high school basketball before he was sent to serve in World War II. He returned in 1944 for the station. He moved to Waterloo, Iowa to cover the minor league baseball Waterloo White Hawks of the Illinois–Indiana–Iowa League in 1946. His first job in the major leagues was eight years later in 1954, when he became the number two radio announcer for the Chicago Cubs, alongside Bert Wilson. In 1958, he moved to a national radio audience by announcing the Game of the Day on the Mutual Broadcasting System, with Bob Feller.

== Houston ==
In 1961, Elston joined veteran radio broadcaster Loel Passe to announce the final season of Houston's minor league franchise, the Houston Buffs. With the expansion of the major league and the inaugural 1962 season of the Houston Colt 45s, Elston was chosen to lead the radio broadcast. Passe stayed on as the color commentator with Elston until Passe retired in 1976. Elston had numerous broadcast partners, such as Harry Kalas (1965 to 1970), Bob Prince (1976), Dewayne Staats (1977 to 1984), and Larry Dierker (1980 to 1986).

The team changed its name to the Astros three years later, and Elston continued as their main announcer through 1986, when he ended his association with the Astros and joined Tal Smith Enterprises as a consultant and researcher.

Elston's broadcasting style was somewhat restrained, as opposed to being a "homer." However, he left himself just enough room to get excited during historic moments, such as Nolan Ryan's fifth career no-hitter:

Two balls and no strikes to Baker. And a ground ball to third! Art Howe--he got it! Nolan Ryan--no-hitter number five!

In 25 seasons, Elston called eleven no-hitters and two division clinchers for the Astros to go along with calling the 500th home run of Eddie Mathews and Nolan Ryan passing Walter Johnson for strikeouts. In late 1986, Dick Wagner fired Elston, who responded by stating, "If they want somebody to phony up some excitement, I can’t change my personality."

== CBS Radio ==
Starting in 1987, Elston resumed calling national radio broadcasts instead of games for a specific team. He called the CBS Radio Game of the Week until 1995, and also called postseason NLDS games on CBS Radio in 1995, 1996, and 1997. He then retired from broadcasting.

== Historical baseball record preservation ==
In the early 1990s, Elston assisted Retrosheet, a project to preserve and computerize historical major-league play-by-play records. Retrosheet founder David W. Smith contacted Elston after learning that the Houston Astros' team scorebook archive contained relatively few records from the franchise's early years. Elston provided his personal scorebooks covering Houston games from 1962 through 1966, as well as some individual scoresheets from the 1970s. Elston's collection helped fill gaps in the Astros' surviving records.

In the organization's first newsletter in October 1994, Smith identified Elston among the broadcasters and sportswriters whose original scorebooks had been loaned to Retrosheet for copying and return.

== Legacy ==
Elston was inducted into the Texas Baseball Hall of Fame in 1993 and the Texas Radio Hall of Fame in 2002.

In 2006, Elston was awarded the Ford C. Frick Award from the Baseball Hall of Fame. The award is given annually to a baseball announcer who has given major contributions to the game. Elston was healthy enough, at the age of 84, to accept the award in person at Cooperstown.

== Death ==
Elston died at the age of 93 in 2015. His ashes were placed in the Houston National Cemetery.

== See also ==
- Houston Astros award winners and league leaders
