= Tony Kubek =

American baseball player and broadcaster (born 1935)

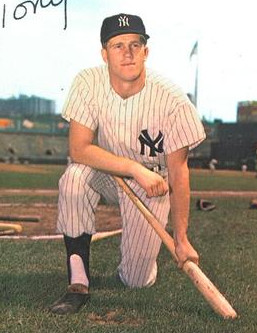
- Kubek, circa 1964–65
- Shortstop
- Born: October 12, 1935 (age 91); Milwaukee, Wisconsin, U.S.
- Batted: Left Threw: Right

MLB debut
- April 20, 1957, for the New York Yankees

Last MLB appearance
- October 3, 1965, for the New York Yankees

MLB statistics
- Batting average: .266
- Home runs: 57
- Runs batted in: 373
- Stats at Baseball Reference

Teams
- New York Yankees (1957–1965)

Career highlights and awards
- 4× All-Star (1958, 1959², 1961, 1961²); 3× World Series champion (1958, 1961, 1962); AL Rookie of the Year (1957); Ford C. Frick Award (2009)

Member of the Canadian

Baseball Hall of Fame
- Induction: 2016

Anthony Christopher Kubek (born October 12, 1935) is an American former professional baseball player and television broadcaster. During his nine-year playing career with the New York Yankees, Kubek played in six World Series in the late 1950s and early 1960s, starting in 37 World Series games. For NBC television, he later broadcast twelve World Series between 1968 and 1982, and fourteen League Championship Series between 1969 and 1989. Kubek received the Ford C. Frick Award in 2009.

== Playing career ==
A left-handed batter, Kubek signed his first professional contract with the Yankees and rose rapidly through the team's farm system. He was 21 years old when he played his first game in Major League Baseball in 1957, and—except for one year (1962) spent largely in the U.S. military—remained with the Yankees until his retirement due to a back injury at the close of the 1965 season. In his prime he formed a top double play combination with second baseman (and roommate) Bobby Richardson on an infield that also featured third baseman Clete Boyer.

In 1957, teammate Sal Maglie praised Kubek when talking to Robert Creamer of Sports Illustrated. "He's a nice boy, that Kubek. He's going to be a great player. He's a fine hitter right now. He hits with the pitch and it's hard to fool him. His wrists are so quick he can wait to see where the pitch is thrown before he commits himself, and then he can push it to left or pull it to right. And he's never satisfied with himself. That's the sign of a good ballplayer."

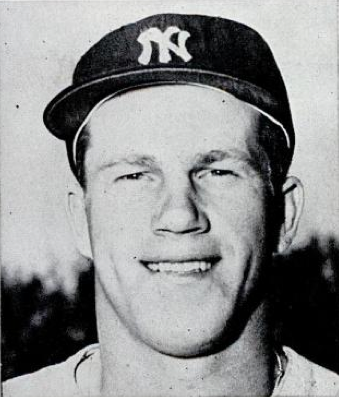
Kubek in 1961

Kubek played 1,092 games, 882 of them at shortstop (although he also was an outfielder and utility infielder in his early career), compiling a lifetime batting average of .266 with 57 home runs. The 38 doubles he totaled in 1961 remained the Yankee club record for shortstops until 2004, and his career fielding percentage and range factor were both above league average. During his nine years with the Yankees, he played on seven American League pennant winners (1957–58, 1960–64) and three world champions (1958, 1961–1962).

In 1982, Kubek was inducted into the National Polish-American Sports Hall of Fame.

In 1986, Kubek took part in Old-Timers' Day at Yankee Stadium for the only time, as that year's event was a reunion of the 1961 Yankees, and marked the recent passing of Roger Maris.

He was signed by Yankees scout Lou Maguolo.

=== Rookie of the Year ===
In 1957, Kubek won the American League Rookie of the Year Award. In Game 3 of the 1957 World Series, he had one of the best World Series games a rookie has ever had, going 3 for 5 with two home runs, three runs scored, and four RBI in the first MLB game he played in his hometown of Milwaukee. Kubek is one of five rookies to hit two home runs in a World Series game. Another Yankee, Charlie Keller, had performed the feat in the 1939 World Series against the Cincinnati Reds and St. Louis Cardinal Willie McGee homered twice in the 1982 World Series against the Milwaukee Brewers. All three of these feats occurred in a Game 3; Kubek's and McGee's both occurred at Milwaukee County Stadium. The Atlanta Braves' Andruw Jones homered twice in Game 1 of the 1996 World Series at Yankee Stadium. Michael Conforto of the New York Mets became the fifth member of this club when he hit two in Game 4 of the 2015 World Series on October 31, 2015.

=== 1960 World Series ===
In Game 7 of the 1960 World Series, Kubek was shaken up by a bad-hop ground ball that struck him in the throat in the eighth inning. Bill Virdon reached first base on the infield single, and Kubek was replaced by substitute Joe DeMaestri. Virdon's hit helped the Pittsburgh Pirates rally for a dramatic 10–9 victory, which was completed by a game-winning home run by Bill Mazeroski one inning later. The play haunted Kubek for the rest of his baseball life. TV personality Phil Silvers, a Brooklyn Dodgers fan, in response to a reporter's question of how to rattle Kubek, once said "Show him a pebble," an apparent reference to infield debris that can cause a bad hop. Years later, when broadcast partner Bob Costas referenced Virdon's smash on the air, Kubek put his hand on Costas' thigh to stop him.

== Broadcasting career ==
=== NBC Sports, CTV and TSN ===
Upon his retirement, Kubek became a color commentator on NBC's Saturday Game of the Week telecasts, teaming with play-by-play announcer Jim Simpson on the network's backup games from 1966 to 1968 and then joining Curt Gowdy to form the lead crew in 1969. He spent 24 years at NBC, teaming with such announcers as Simpson, Gowdy (whom Kubek later called his favorite partner), Joe Garagiola, and Bob Costas. Kubek could be considered baseball's first network baseball analyst as contrasted with a color commentator, similar to Tim McCarver and Jim Kaat later.

In addition to the weekly in-season games, Kubek worked 11 World Series (1969–1976, 1978, 1980 and 1982) for NBC, as well as 14 American League Championship Series (1969–1975, 1977, 1979, 1981, 1983, 1985, 1987, and 1989), and 10 All-Star Games (1969–1975, 1977, 1979, and 1981).

He also worked local telecasts for the Toronto Blue Jays on The Sports Network and CTV from their inaugural season of 1977 through 1989. The Toronto Star stated Kubek "educated a whole generation of Canadian baseball fans without being condescending or simplistic."

During the winter, Kubek would go hunting, coach junior high basketball, and wait for baseball to resume.

==== Personality ====
As a sportscaster, Kubek was known for his outspokenness. While calling the 1972 American League Championship Series, Kubek said that Oakland's Bert Campaneris throwing his bat at Detroit's Lerrin LaGrow (who had just knocked Campaneris down with a low, inside pitch) was justified, on the grounds that any pitch aimed squarely at a batter's legs could endanger his career. Angered by Kubek's comments, executives from Detroit's Chrysler Corporation, which sponsored NBC's telecasts, phoned then-Commissioner of Baseball Bowie Kuhn, who, in turn, called the network about the matter.

On April 8, 1974, when Hank Aaron hit his record-breaking 715th career home run, Kubek, who was calling the game with Curt Gowdy and Joe Garagiola, criticized Bowie Kuhn on air for failing to be in attendance at Atlanta on that historic night. Kuhn later argued he had a prior engagement he could not break.

In the 10th inning of Game 3 of the 1975 World Series, Cincinnati's César Gerónimo reached first base. Then, Boston catcher Carlton Fisk threw Ed Armbrister's bunt into center field. Kubek, on the NBC telecast, immediately charged that Armbrister interfered (with the attempted forceout), though home plate umpire Larry Barnett did not agree. After Joe Morgan drove in the game-winning run for the Reds in a 6–5 victory, Barnett blamed Kubek and Gowdy for inciting death threats against him. Later, Kubek got 1,000 letters dubbing him a Boston stooge.

In 1978, Kubek had said of New York Yankees' owner George Steinbrenner that "He's got an expensive toy. Baseball's tough enough without an owner harassing you." In a Sports Illustrated article published May 27, 1991, on the Yankees' bad season, he would go on to criticize Steinbrenner once again by saying, "George's legacy is not the World Series winners of '77 and '78 or having the best record of any team in the '80s, his legacy is these past five seasons—teams with worse and worse records culminating in last year's last-place finish." Kubek also added, "George talked a lot about tradition, but it was all phony, it was just him trying to be part of the tradition. You can't manufacture tradition in a plastic way. You have to have a certain class to go with it."

==== With Bob Costas ====
The team of Kubek and Bob Costas (backing up Vin Scully and Joe Garagiola and later, Tom Seaver) proved to be a formidable pair. Costas was praised by fans for both his reverence and irreverence while Kubek was praised for his technical approach and historical perspective. One of the pair's most memorable broadcasts was the "(Ryne) Sandberg Game" (between the Chicago Cubs and St. Louis Cardinals at Chicago's Wrigley Field) on June 23, 1984. In the ninth inning, the Cubs, trailing 9–8, faced the premier relief pitcher of the time, Bruce Sutter. Sandberg, then not known for his power, slugged a home run to left field against the Cardinals' ace closer. Despite this dramatic act, the Cardinals scored two runs in the top of the tenth. Sandberg came up again in the tenth inning, facing a determined Sutter with one man on base. Sandberg then shocked the national audience by hitting a second home run, even farther into the left field bleachers, to tie the game again. The Cubs went on to win in the 11th inning. When Sandberg hit that second home run, Costas said, "Do you believe it?!" The Cardinals' Willie McGee also hit for the cycle in the same game.

Kubek and Costas, who had worked together since 1983 (calling four American League Championship Series: 1983, 1985, 1987, and 1989), called the final edition (the 981st overall) of NBC's Game of the Week, which aired on September 30, 1989. That game featured the Toronto Blue Jays (Kubek was the broadcaster, from 1977 to 1989 for the Blue Jays) beating the Baltimore Orioles 4–3 to clinch the AL East title at SkyDome.

When the subject came up of NBC losing the rights to televising Major League Baseball for the first time since 1946, Kubek said, "I can't believe it!" The final broadcast for Kubek and Costas as a team was Game 5 of the 1989 American League Championship Series (October 8), also at SkyDome, where the Oakland Athletics won to advance to the World Series.

=== MSG Network and retirement ===
When NBC lost its baseball TV rights to CBS after the 1989 season, Kubek left the national scene, joining the Yankees' local cable-TV announcing team (which earned Kubek US$525,000 a year).

Kubek spent five years calling games for the Yankees (1990–1994) on the MSG Network with Dewayne Staats, where he earned fans and critics' respect for his honesty. After 1994, Kubek effectively quit broadcasting. He explained his sudden retirement from sportscasting by saying:

I hate what the game's become—the greed, the nastiness. You can be married to baseball, give your heart to it, but when it starts taking over your soul, it's time to say 'whoa'.

Kubek added, "I want to go home and spend more time with my family. They deserve it more than anyone. I don't need that ego stuff. I feel sorry for those who do." In a 2008 New York Times article, Kubek claimed not to have seen a major league game since his retirement from broadcasting.

Kubek lives in Appleton, Wisconsin, and is a supporter of the Fox Valley Lutheran High School and its baseball team. The National Polish-American Sports Hall of Fame on June 20, 2019, named its inaugural Excellence in Media Award the Tony Kubek Award and Adrian Wojnarowski of ESPN was honored.

=== Ford C. Frick Award ===
On December 22, 2008, Tony Kubek was named the recipient of the 2009 Ford C. Frick Award, an honor bestowed on broadcasters by the Baseball Hall of Fame.

Kubek was selected for the honor by a committee of 15 prior Frick Award winners and five broadcast historians and columnists. He became the first Frick Award winner whose broadcast career was solely in television, and the first to have called games for a Canadian team, the Toronto Blue Jays, from 1977 to 1989.

In that regard he was named to the Canadian Baseball Hall of Fame, in St. Marys, Ontario, in the Class of 2016.

== Politics ==
Kubek is a Democrat. In 1976, he declined to go to South Carolina to campaign for former teammate Bobby Richardson, a Republican, who lost a close race for the U.S. House of Representatives to incumbent Democrat Kenneth Holland by a 51% to 48% margin.

== See also ==
- List of Major League Baseball players with a home run in their final at bat

Media offices
Preceded by Pee Wee Reese	Lead color commentator, Major League Baseball on NBC; 1969–1982	Succeeded by Joe Garagiola
Preceded by Pee Wee Reese	Lead color commentator, Major League Baseball Game of the Week; 1969–1982	Succeeded by Joe Garagiola
Preceded by Sal Bando	Secondary color commentator, Major League Baseball Game of the Week; 1983–1989	Succeeded by Jim Kaat
