= Gene Kirby =

American sports announcer (1915–2011)

Eugene Kirby (May 27, 1915 – April 27, 2011) was an American Major League Baseball announcer and front office executive. Kirby was one of the key play-by-play announcers for the Mutual Broadcasting System's Major League "Game of the Day" broadcasts during the late 1940s and 1950s, along with Dizzy Dean, Al Helfer, Art Gleeson and others. According to his obituary in Baseball America, Kirby worked with Dean for almost 20 years at Mutual, ABC and CBS.

Kirby also spent part of his career in baseball administration, serving as traveling secretary of the Montreal Expos beginning with their founding in 1969, vice president, administration, of the Boston Red Sox (1975–1977), and director of broadcasting of the Expos and Philadelphia Phillies. While known largely for his work in baseball, Kirby also broadcast American college football and professional and college basketball.

In retirement, he lived in Treasure Island, Florida, where he was a longtime friend of veteran baseball man Don Zimmer. Kirby died aged 95 on April 27, 2011. Before he died, he authored a Dizzy Dean biography entitled Dizzy: Dean of Baseball & My Podnah with Mark S. McDonald and Bo Carter.
