= Chris Carrino =

American sports play-by-play announcer

- Occupation: Sports Play-by-Play Announcer
- Website: https://chriscarrinofoundation.org/about-chris-carrino

Chris Carrino is an American sports play-by-play announcer who works for Compass Media Networks, Westwood One, and WFAN. He is one of Compass' main voices of National Football League radio contests and is the radio voice of the Brooklyn Nets of the National Basketball Association.

== Broadcasting career ==
He currently serves at the lead radio play-by-play announcer for the Brooklyn Nets of the National Basketball Association, a position he has held for nearly a decade, as one of Compass Media Networks' NFL play-by-play broadcasters, and a backup play by play announcer for the Brooklyn Nets on the YES Network.

Carrino also served as a play-by-play announcer for NBC Sports coverage of Basketball at the 2008 Summer Olympics. In 2009, Compass Media Networks hired Carrino to call its national radio broadcasts of National Football League games. In 2012, Carrino was tabbed to call a limited schedule of Los Angeles Angels of Anaheim baseball games distributed nationally by Compass Media.

He has also called college football for the ESPN Networks and Euroleague Basketball games for NBA TV and ESPN. He is a backup radio announcer for the New York Giants (when Bob Papa is unavailable) and Fordham Rams football, basketball, and baseball.

== Personal life ==
Carrino has been a resident of Marlboro Township, New Jersey. He has a wife and one child (Chris Carrino II).

Carrino has been diagnosed with facioscapulohumeral muscular dystrophy (FSHD), a disease the causes progressive weakening of the muscles, for which the Chris Carrino Foundation was created.

Carrino executive produced Nets Slammin' Planet a show hosted by Evan Roberts, Albert King and Brandon "Scoop B" Robinson.
