= John MacLean (sportscaster) =

American journalist

John F. MacLean (March 9, 1921 in Lynn, Massachusetts – September 13, 1973 in Baltimore, Maryland) was a Major League Baseball announcer for the Mutual Broadcasting System from 1956 to 1960, Washington Senators from 1961 to 1968 and the Boston Red Sox in 1972. He left the Red Sox radio broadcast crew in June 1972 due to illness. He died on September 13, 1973, following open-heart surgery.
