= Jim Hunter (sportscaster) =

American sports announcer

James Dennis Hunter (born 1959) is an American broadcaster and sports announcer, most recently with the Baltimore Orioles of Major League Baseball. His 24-year tenure with the team began in 1997. Hunter announced that the Orioles were not renewing his contract via Twitter on January 22, 2021.

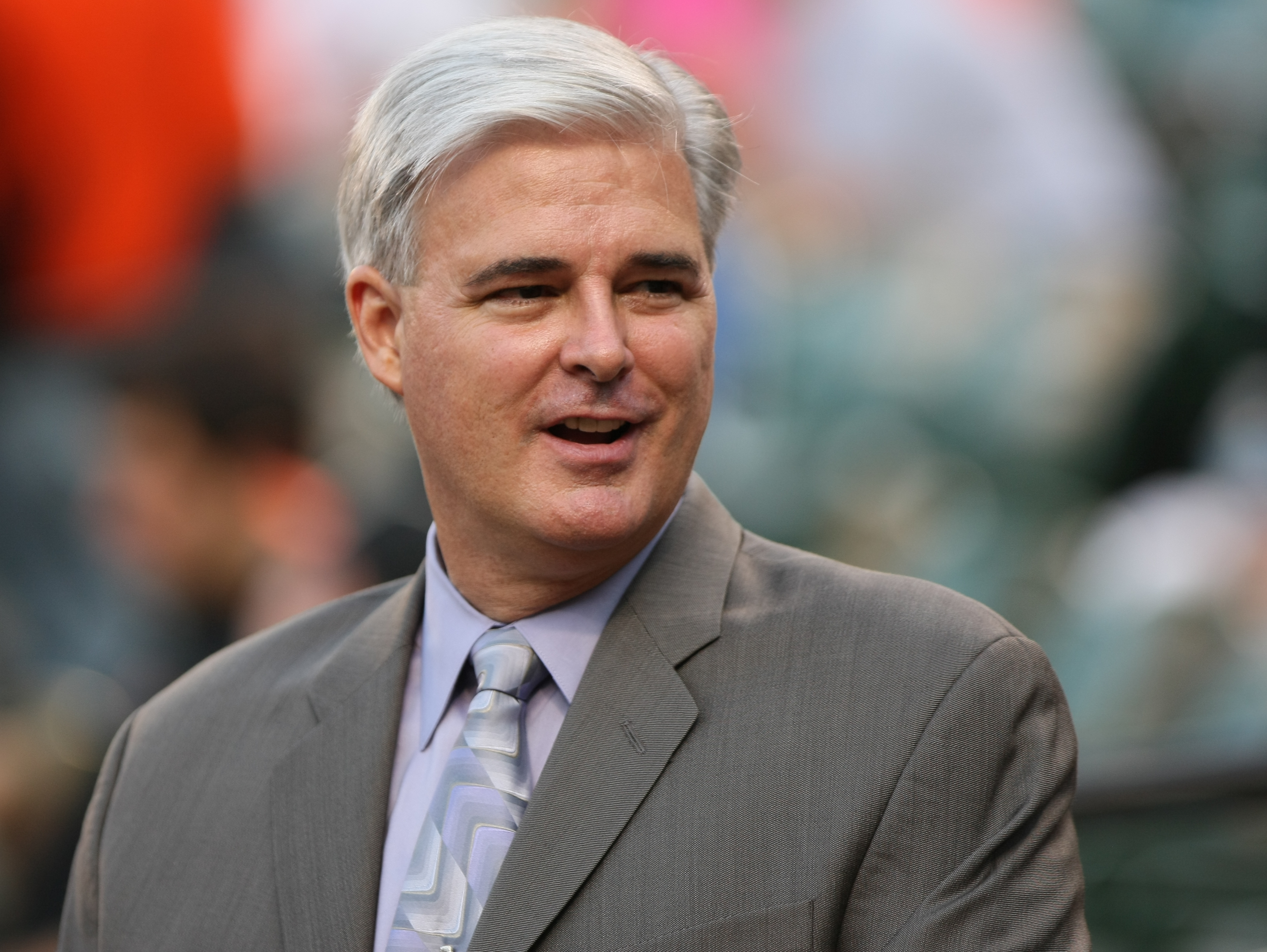
Hunter in 2009

== Biography ==
Hunter was with CBS Radio Sports from 1982 to 1996. While with CBS Radio he called the baseball 'Game of the Week' from 1986 to the end of his tenure there, as well as numerous postseason series. He was also a studio announcer for CBS Radio during the 1992 and 1994 Olympic Winter Games. While with the Orioles, he hosted O's Xtra on MASN and called play-by-play for select games. He called MASN's coverage of college football and basketball.

After leaving the Orioles in 2021, he joined the on-air staff of Maryland Public Television.

Hunter graduated from St. John Vianney High School in Holmdel Township, New Jersey in 1977, and was inducted into the school's athletic Hall of Fame in 1994. He graduated from Seton Hall University in 1982 and was active in the school's radio station, WSOU. Hunter also attended Brookdale Community College.

Hunter lives in Fallston, Maryland, with his wife Bonnie; they have three children.
