= Bill McColgan =

American sportscaster

- Born: William J. McColgan c. 1926; Dorchester, Boston, Massachusetts, U.S.
- Died: April 30, 1973 (aged 47); New Orleans, Louisiana, U.S.
- Education: Curry College
- Sports commentary career
- Team(s): Cleveland Browns (1954–60); Cleveland Indians (1958–60); Washington Redskins (1961–63); New Orleans Saints (1971–72)
- Genre: Play-by-play
- Sport(s): National Football League; Major League Baseball

William J. McColgan (died April 30, 1973) was an American sportscaster.

A native of Boston, McColgan graduated from St. Margaret's School and South Boston High School. After serving in the U.S. Navy during World War II, he attended Curry College.

McColgan began his career in Vermont. In 1951, he moved to Youngstown, Ohio, where he was the sports director for WFMJ. In 1953, he joined WGAR/WGAR-FM in Cleveland, where he called Cleveland Browns (1954–1960), Cleveland Indians (1958–1960), Ohio State Buckeyes football, and Cleveland Barons games. He then worked for WTOP/WTOP-FM/WTOP-TV in Washington, D.C., where he called Washington Redskins and Maryland Terrapins football games. His final job was with WWL/WWL-TV in New Orleans, where he served as the play-by-play announcer for the New Orleans Saints from 1971 to 1972.

McColgan died on April 30, 1973, in New Orleans of a heart attack. He was 47 years old.
