= Art Gleeson =

American baseball announcer

Arthur Levi Gleeson (September 29, 1906 – November 27, 1964) was an American baseball announcer.

Gleeson was born in Sumpter, Oregon. He got his start calling games for teams in the California League games during the late 1930s and early 1940s. Gleeson served in the U.S. Navy during World War II and worked for the Armed Forces Network after being discharged from submarine service. From 1946 to 1949 he was play-by-play announcer for the Oakland Oaks of the Pacific Coast League. In 1950, he joined Mutual Broadcasting System, where he called New York Yankees games with Mel Allen from 1951 to 1952 and the "Mutual Game of the Day" from 1953 to 1959. From 1956 to 1960 Gleeson was the sports director of MBS. Gleeson joined the Boston Red Sox broadcast team in 1960, calling games with Curt Gowdy, Bill Crowley (1960), and Ned Martin (1961–1964) for five seasons.

Gleeson died of an apparent heart attack in a hotel room in Gold Beach, Oregon, after the 1964 season. He was replaced by Mel Parnell in the Red Sox booth.
