= Major League Baseball Game of the Week =

Television series

The Major League Baseball Game of the Week (GOTW) is the de facto title for nationally televised coverage of regular season Major League Baseball games. The Game of the Week has traditionally aired on Saturday afternoons. When the national networks began televising national games of the week, it opened the door for a national audience to see particular clubs. While most teams were broadcast, emphasis was always on the league leaders and the major market franchises that could draw the largest audience.

== History ==
=== Origins ===
==== 1950s ====
In 1953, ABC-TV executive Edgar J. Scherick (who would later go on to create Wide World of Sports) launched a Saturday Game of the Week- baseball's first regular-season network telecast. At the time, ABC was labeled a "nothing network" that had fewer outlets than CBS or NBC. ABC also needed paid programming or "anything for bills" as Scherick put it. At first, ABC hesitated at the idea of a nationally televised regular season baseball program.

In April 1953, Scherick set out to acquire broadcasting rights from various major league clubs, but only got the Philadelphia Athletics, Cleveland Indians, and Chicago White Sox to sign on. To make matters worse, Major League Baseball blacked out the Game of the Week on any television stations within 50 miles of a ballpark. Major League Baseball, according to Scherick, insisted on protecting local coverage and didn't care about national appeal. ABC though, did care about the national appeal and claimed that "most of America was still up for grabs."

In 1953, ABC earned an 11.4 rating for their Game of the Week telecasts. Blacked-out cities had 32 percent of households. In the rest of the United States, 3 in 4 television sets in use watched Dizzy Dean and Buddy Blattner call the games for ABC.

In 1955, CBS took over the Saturday broadcasts, adding Sunday telecasts in 1957. Dean and Blattner continued to call the games for CBS, with Pee Wee Reese replacing Blattner in 1960. Gene Kirby, who had worked with Dean and Blattner at ABC and Mutual radio, also contributed to the CBS telecasts as a producer and announcer.

NBC began its own Saturday and Sunday coverage in 1957 and 1959, respectively. In 1960, ABC resumed Saturday telecasts; that year the "Big 3" networks aired a combined 123 games.

==== 1960s ====
By 1965, Major League Baseball ended Game of the Week blackouts in cities with MLB clubs. Other cities within fifty miles of an MLB stadium got $6.5 million for exclusivity, and split the pot. ABC provided the first-ever nationwide baseball coverage with weekly Saturday broadcasts on a regional basis. ABC paid $5.7 million for the rights to the 28 Saturday/holiday Games of the Week. ABC's deal covered all of the teams except the New York Yankees and Philadelphia Phillies (who had their own television deals) and called for three regionalized games on Saturdays, Independence Day, and Labor Day. ABC blacked out the games in the home cities of the clubs playing those games. Chris Schenkel, Keith Jackson, and Merle Harmon were the principal play-by-play announcers for ABC's coverage.

Weekly Yankees games were broadcast on CBS, as the Yankees had been acquired by CBS before the 1965 season.

=== NBC's Game of the Week ===
==== 1960s ====
In 1966, the Yankees joined NBC's package, as did the Phillies. The new package under NBC called for 28 games.

On October 19, 1966, NBC signed a new three-year contract with Major League Baseball. Under the new deal, NBC paid roughly $6 million per year for 25 Saturday games and prime-time contests on Memorial Day, Independence Day, and Labor Day; $6.1 million for the 1967 World Series and 1967 All-Star Game; and $6.5 million for the 1968 World Series and 1968 All-Star Game. This brought the total value of the contract (which included three Monday night telecasts) up to $30.6 million.

A black and white kinescope (saved by Armed Forces Television) of a July 12, 1969 game between the Phillies and Chicago Cubs is believed to be the oldest surviving complete telecast of the Saturday afternoon Game of the Week.

==== 1970s ====
In 1976, NBC paid US$10.7 million per year to show 25 Saturday Games of the Week and half of the postseason (both League Championship Series in odd numbered years and World Series in even numbered years). ABC would carry a Monday Night Baseball game (later switched to a combination of Sunday afternoon games in the early and later part of the season and a Monday night game in the rest) and the other half of the postseason. NBC and ABC would continue this particular arrangement through 1989.

Joe Garagiola was promoted to succeed Curt Gowdy as NBC's top play-by-play announcer in a team with color commentator Tony Kubek in 1976.

==== 1980s ====
When NBC inked a new $550 million contract for six years in the fall of 1982, a return on the investment demanded Vin Scully to be their star baseball announcer. Scully was paired with Garagiola as the top broadcast team. Prior to 1983, Scully's only announcing jobs for NBC were several World Series that involved the Brooklyn/Los Angeles Dodgers, for whom Scully was the regular local play-by-play announcer.

Tony Kubek was teamed with Bob Costas as the secondary announcer team in 1983. The team of Costas and Kubek proved to be a formidable pair. There were even some who preferred the team of Kubek and Costas over the musings of Vin Scully and the asides of Joe Garagiola.

One of Bob Costas and Tony Kubek's most memorable broadcasts came on June 23, 1984. The duo were at Wrigley Field to call a game between the Chicago Cubs and St. Louis Cardinals. Led by second baseman Ryne Sandberg, the Cubs rallied from a 9–3 deficit before winning it in extra innings. After Sandberg hit his second home run in the game (with two out in the bottom of the 9th to tie it 11–11), Costas cried "That's the real Roy Hobbs because this can't be happening! We're sitting here, and it doesn't make any difference if it's 1984 or '54–just freeze this and don't change a thing!"

In 1984, NBC got a break when Major League Baseball dictated a policy that no local game could be televised at the same time that a network Game of the Week was being broadcast. Additionally, for the first time, NBC was able to feed the Game of the Week telecasts to the two cities whose local teams participated. In time, MLB teams whose Saturday games were not scheduled for the Game of the Week would move the start time of their Saturday games to avoid conflict with the NBC network game, and thus, make it available to local television in the team's home city (and the visiting team's home city as well).

===== The end of an era =====
On December 14, 1988, CBS paid approximately $1.8 billion for exclusive over-the-air television rights for over four years beginning in 1990. CBS paid about $265 million each year for the World Series, League Championship Series, All-Star Game, and the Saturday Game of the Week.

The final regular season edition of NBC's Game of the Week was televised on September 30, 1989. That game featured the Toronto Blue Jays beating the Baltimore Orioles 4–3 to clinch the AL East title from the SkyDome. It was the 981st edition of NBC's Game of the Week overall.

NBC's final game of the year was televised on October 9, 1989. It was Game 5 of the 1989 National League Championship Series between the San Francisco Giants and Chicago Cubs from Candlestick Park. At the end of the telecast, game announcer Vin Scully said "It's a passing of a great American tradition. It is sad. I really and truly feel that. It will leave a vast window, to use a Washington word, where people will not get Major League Baseball and I think that's a tragedy. It's a staple that's gone. I feel for people who come to me and say how they miss it, and I hope me."

Bob Costas said "Who thought baseball'd kill its best way to reach the public? It coulda kept us and CBS–we'd have kept the "Game"–but it only cared about cash." Costas added that he would rather do a Game of the Week that got a 5 rating than host a Super Bowl. "Whatever else I did, I'd never have left "Game of the Week"" Costas claimed.

==== Notable Game of the Week broadcast on NBC ====
On April 7, 1984, the Detroit Tigers' Jack Morris threw a no-hitter against the Chicago White Sox at Comiskey Park; the game was the 1984 season opener for NBC's baseball coverage, and it was the only no-hit game thrown in the series' history.

=== CBS takes over (1990–1993) ===
CBS took over MLB broadcasts with the 1990 season. However, CBS alienated and confused fans with their sporadic treatment of regular season telecasts. CBS televised 16 regular season Saturday afternoon games each season (not counting back-up telecasts), which was 14 fewer than what NBC televised during the previous contract. CBS employed the strategy of airing only a select number of games in part because the network had a number of other weekend summer sports commitments, most notably PGA Tour golf; and partly to build up viewer demand in response to supposedly sagging ratings. In addition, CBS angered fans by largely ignoring the divisional pennant races; instead, their scheduled games focused on games featuring major-market teams, regardless of their record.

NBC play-by-play man Bob Costas believed that a large bulk of the regular-season coverage beginning in the 1990s shifted to cable (namely, ESPN) because CBS did not really want the Saturday Game of the Week and that they were only truly after the marquee events (i.e. All-Star Game, League Championship Series, and the World Series) in order to sell advertising space (especially the fall entertainment television schedule). The league and network chose not to renew their contract after the 1993 season, and CBS has not broadcast Major League Baseball in any fashion since.

=== Hiatus period (1994–1995) ===
In 1994 and 1995, there was no traditional Saturday Game of the Week coverage. In those two seasons, The Baseball Network (a joint venture by MLB, NBC and ABC) utilized a purely regional schedule of 12 games per week that could only be seen based on the viewer's local affiliate. The arrangement proved to be unpopular and, coupled with the 1994 strike, led to the joint venture being abandoned after only two years.

=== The Fox era (1996–present) ===
Major League Baseball made a deal with the Fox Broadcasting Company on November 7, 1995. Fox paid a fraction of the amount of money that CBS paid for the Major League Baseball television rights for the 1990 through 1993 seasons. Unlike The Baseball Network arrangement, Fox reverted to the format of televising regular season games (approximately 16 weekly telecasts that normally began on Memorial Day weekend) on Saturday afternoons. Fox's initial approach was to offer four regionalized telecasts, with exclusivity from 1:00 to 4:00 p.m. in each time zone.

Like NBC and CBS before it, Fox determined its Saturday schedule by who was playing a team from one of the three largest television markets: New York City, Los Angeles, or Chicago. If there was a game which combined two of these three markets, it would be aired.

In Fox's first season of Major League Baseball coverage in 1996, they averaged a 2.7 rating for its Saturday telecasts. That was down 23% from CBS' 3.4 in 1993 despite the latter network's infamy for its rather haphazard Game of the Week schedule.

In 2004, Fox's Game of the Week telecasts only appeared three times after August 28, due to ratings competition from college football (especially since Fox affiliates may have had syndicated college football broadcasts). By that point, Joe Buck, Fox's lead baseball play-by-play announcer, was unavailable to call baseball games, since he had become Fox's top NFL announcer. The following two seasons saw similar interruptions in Fox's September coverage.

Fox renewed its contract in 2006. One of the terms of the deal was that, beginning with the 2007 season, the Saturday Game of the Week coverage was extended over the entire season rather than starting after Memorial Day, with most games being aired in the 3:30–7:00 p.m. (EDT) time slot.

In 2014, the Fox Sports 1 cable network began airing regular-season games over 26 Saturdays. As a result, MLB regular season coverage on the over the air Fox network was reduced to 12 weeks.

In 2022, as part of their renewal of rights, Fox agreed to increase their coverage on the broadcast network. Most weeks of the season Fox exclusively airs two or three prime time games in regional coverage as part of their Baseball Night in America broadcasts, with FS1 carrying a non-exclusive Saturday afternoon game. During September, when the Saturday evening games conflict with Fox's college football obligations, the network carries Thursday night games instead.

== The Game of the Week on radio ==
From 1985 to 1997, CBS Radio aired its own incarnation of the Game of the Week, broadcasting games at various times on Saturday afternoons and/or Sunday nights. In 1998, national radio rights went to ESPN Radio, which airs Saturday games during the season as well as Sunday Night Baseball and Opening Day and holiday broadcasts.

Earlier, the Mutual and Liberty networks had aired Game of the Day broadcasts to non-major-league cities in the late 1940s and 1950s.

== A game and B games ==
During NBC's era of Game of the Week broadcasts, the network actually carried two games, the A game was generally broadcast to approximately 80% of the country. The B game (also known as the backup game) generally existed as a backup in case of rainouts or other delays at the A game.

Prior to Game of the Week being given exclusivity in the 1980s, NBC typically had the A game broadcast to most of the country, but not to the markets of the participating teams, while the B game was aired in the home markets of the teams in the A game. In those days, the television rules did not allow a market to see its local team play on NBC. However, in situations where one game got rained out, the rules would be relaxed. When Game of the Week gained exclusivity, allowing for airing games in the teams' home markets, the B game normally only aired in the participants' home markets.
