= Liberty Broadcasting System =

American radio network

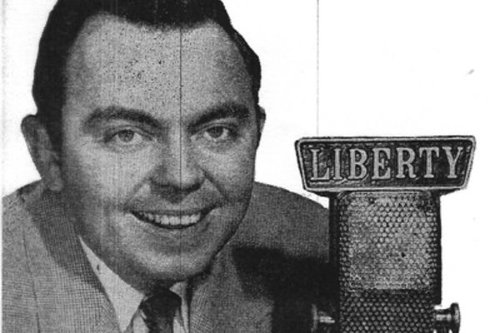
Liberty founder Gordon McLendon with a Liberty-branded microphone

The Liberty Broadcasting System (commonly referred to simply as Liberty; also known as Liberty Radio or the Liberty Radio Network; informally abbreviated as LBS) was a U.S. radio network of the late 1940s and early 1950s founded by Gordon McLendon & his father, B.R. McLendon, through their Dallas, Texas-based broadcasting company, Trinity Broadcasting Corporation (no relation to the Trinity Broadcasting Network (TBN)), which mainly broadcast live recreations of Major League Baseball games, by following the action via Western Union ticker reports. The sound effects were very realistic, and many listeners were not aware the broadcasters were not announcing the action live. At that time some major league teams and almost all minor league baseball clubs used recreations of their road games as an economy measure.

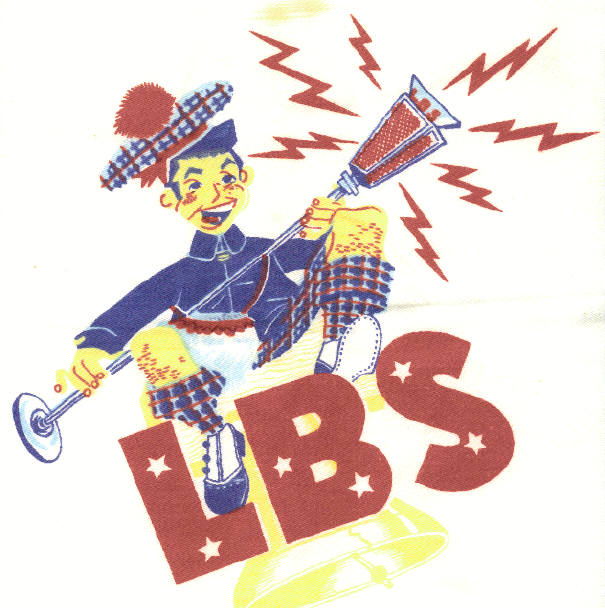
Alternate logo for Liberty

However, sports was not the only programming Liberty broadcast; among the other program genres Liberty carried were music programs, news commentary, and entertainment and drama.

== Availability ==
Founded in 1948, the network was mainly in Texas and the southwest but did have nine affiliates in Oregon, an outlet in Los Angeles, Seattle, and as of September 29, 1950, WHAV in Haverhill, Massachusetts. At one time, it had close to 500 radio stations on the line, being second in size only to Mutual. In fact, before it ceased operations, Liberty was recognized by some as an attempt at a fifth major radio network after Mutual alongside the Keystone Broadcasting System (KBS) & PBS.

== Major League Baseball ==
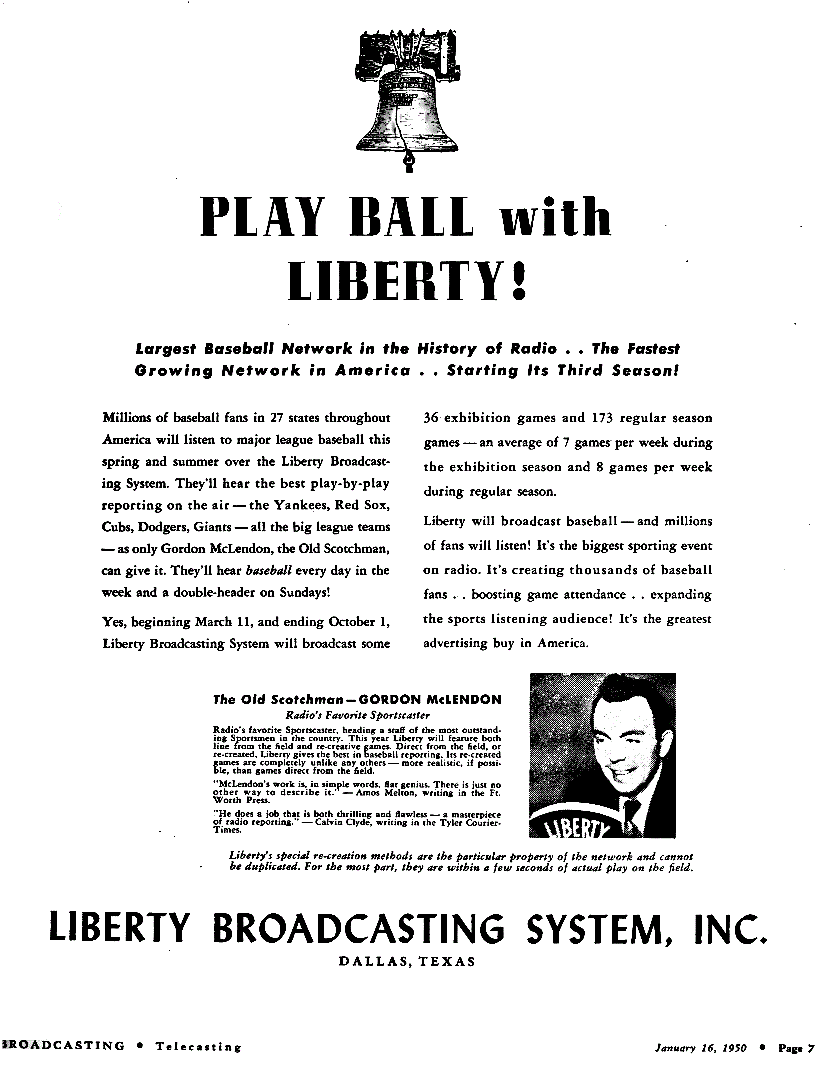
1950 network advertisement.

Liberty carried various types of programs, such as music (late night music, band remotes, and other music programming produced to fill its the network's schedule), news commentary (featuring established news analysts, like William L. Shirer, Raymond Gram Swing, and Joseph C. Harsch, who had left the major networks), and entertainment and drama (offered were game shows, mysteries, advice programs, and children's story hours). But McLendon, known as the "Old Scotchman", and his daily ball-game recreations off the Western Union ticker provided the big money maker. The recreations used himself and future sportscasting stars such as Lindsey Nelson and Jerry Doggett.

It was a live, not recreated, game that provided McLendon and Liberty with their greatest career moment. The Scotchman himself was behind the Liberty mic at the Polo Grounds in New York on October 3, 1951, for the finale of the three-game National League play-off series between the New York Giants and Brooklyn Dodgers.

Radio was still the more popular nationwide medium then. With Russ Hodges' famous radio call limited to the Giants' network, McLendon's call is how most Americans heard the NL clincher, including Giant Bobby Thomson's ninth-inning three-run homer into the left-field stands to win it for New York. Excerpts of the McLendon broadcast were highlighted in the 2001 HBO documentary Shot Heard 'Round the World.

=== Rights fees ===
According to Time magazine articles of the era, McLendon only paid Major League Baseball $1,000.00 per year for the rights to broadcast the games, but in 1951, the leagues raised the price to $250,000.00 per year, and prohibited broadcasts in any city which had a minor league franchise and in the northeastern and midwestern United States.

=== Liberty baseball commentators ===
- Bud Blattner (1950–1951)
- Jerry Doggett (1950–1951)
- Gordon McLendon (1949–1952)
- Lindsey Nelson (1950–1951)
- Don Wells
- Wes Wise

=== Demise ===
Sports were the lifeblood of Liberty. Restrictions on Major League Baseball broadcasts in minor league franchise areas, as well as bans on National Football League broadcasts within a 75-mile range of league cities, were the one-two blow which ended the network. Since the baseball games were a major draw for both listeners and affiliates, the blackout was a disaster for the fledgling company, which had only posted modest profits during its first few years of operation. More than 100 stations left the network, and, faced with mounting debts, on May 16, 1952, the network ceased broadcasting.

== National Basketball Association ==
Liberty also broadcast NBA games from roughly, the 1950-51 through 1951-52 seasons.

=== Commentators ===
- Hilliard Gates
- Marty Glickman
- Johnny Most

== Liberty Broadcasting System today ==
In the mid-2000s, a Spokane, Washington-based broadcaster, Thomas W. Read, began using the Mutual Broadcasting System and Liberty Broadcasting names as licensees for his two stations, KTRW AM 970 Spokane; and KTAC FM 93.9 Ephrata, Washington. These stations have no connections with the original network, but present adult standards, nostalgia, and some Christian programming, using these names as part of the nostalgia-style branding.
