= List of World Series broadcasters =

The following is a list of national American television and radio networks and announcers that have broadcast World Series games over the years, as well as local flagship radio stations that have aired them since 1982.

== Television ==
Television coverage of the World Series began in 1947, but with TV broadcasting still in its infancy and the limited number of coaxial inter-connected stations, telecasts during the first four years were open to any channel with a network affiliation in selected markets. 1951 marked the first time that the World Series aired on one network, NBC, as well as the first to be seen from coast to coast. NBC continued to televise the World Series until new broadcast rights deals began in 1976 that had NBC televise in even years and ABC in odd years. CBS then had the series from 1990 to 1993. Following a players' strike that canceled the 1994 World Series, games of the 1995 World Series were split between ABC and NBC as part of The Baseball Network, a revenue-sharing joint venture between the two networks and Major League Baseball. Under the rights from 1996 to 2000, Fox televised in even years and NBC in odd years. Since 2001, Fox has been the exclusive broadcaster of the World Series.

Eight different men have called eight or more different World Series telecasts as either play-by-play announcers or color commentators. They are (through 2025) Joe Buck and Tim McCarver (both 24), Curt Gowdy (12), Mel Allen and Vin Scully (both 11), Joe Garagiola and John Smoltz (both 10), Tony Kubek and Al Michaels (both 8).

=== 2020s ===
Year	Network	Play-by-play	Color commentator(s)	Field reporter(s)	Pregame hosts	Pregame analysts	Trophy presentation
2026	Fox/Fox One	Joe Davis	John Smoltz	Ken Rosenthal and Tom Verducci	Kevin Burkhardt	Alex Rodriguez, David Ortiz, and Derek Jeter	Kevin Burkhardt
2025	Fox/Fox One (US)	Joe Davis	John Smoltz	Ken Rosenthal and Tom Verducci	Kevin Burkhardt	Alex Rodriguez, David Ortiz, and Derek Jeter	Kevin Burkhardt
2025	Citytv (Canada)	Joe Davis	John Smoltz	Ken Rosenthal and Tom Verducci	Kevin Burkhardt	Alex Rodriguez, David Ortiz, and Derek Jeter	Kevin Burkhardt
2025	Sportsnet/Sportsnet+ (Canada)	Dan Shulman	Buck Martinez	Hazel Mae, Caleb Joseph, and Kevin Pillar	Jamie Campbell	Joe Siddall and Madison Shipman	Kevin Burkhardt
2024	Fox	Joe Davis	John Smoltz	Ken Rosenthal and Tom Verducci	Kevin Burkhardt	Alex Rodriguez, David Ortiz, and Derek Jeter	Kevin Burkhardt
2023	Fox	Joe Davis	John Smoltz	Ken Rosenthal and Tom Verducci	Kevin Burkhardt	Alex Rodriguez, David Ortiz, and Derek Jeter	Kevin Burkhardt
2022	Fox	Joe Davis	John Smoltz	Ken Rosenthal and Tom Verducci	Kevin Burkhardt	Alex Rodriguez, David Ortiz, and Frank Thomas	Kevin Burkhardt
2021	Fox	Joe Buck	John Smoltz	Ken Rosenthal and Tom Verducci	Kevin Burkhardt	Alex Rodriguez, David Ortiz, and Frank Thomas	Kevin Burkhardt
2020	Fox	Joe Buck	John Smoltz	Ken Rosenthal and Tom Verducci	Kevin Burkhardt	Alex Rodriguez, David Ortiz, and Frank Thomas	Tom Verducci

==== Notes ====
- Per the current broadcast agreement, the World Series will be televised by Fox through 2028.
- 2022 - Tom Verducci filled in for Kevin Burkhardt as postgame host for Game 2 due to Burkhardt calling the San Francisco 49ers-Los Angeles Rams Week 8 NFL game for Fox.
- Beginning with the 2022 postseason, MLB allowed Sportsnet, the home network of the Toronto Blue Jays, to produce their own broadcasts of the team's games in Canada rather than a mere simulcast of the American network feed or an MLB International-produced broadcast. For World Series broadcasts, Sportsnet simulcasts the American broadcast feed on its sister over-the-air station Citytv, which has in the past carried U.S. network coverage of major events being aired on Sportsnet to avail of simultaneous substitution rules, whereby the American network feed is substituted with a Canadian broadcast channel on cable providers.

=== 2010s ===
Year	Network	Play-by-play	Color commentator(s)	Field reporter(s)	Pregame hosts	Pregame analysts	Trophy presentation
2019	Fox	Joe Buck	John Smoltz	Ken Rosenthal and Tom Verducci	Kevin Burkhardt	Alex Rodriguez, David Ortiz, and Frank Thomas	Kevin Burkhardt
2018	Fox	Joe Buck	John Smoltz	Ken Rosenthal and Tom Verducci	Kevin Burkhardt	Alex Rodriguez, David Ortiz, and Frank Thomas	Kevin Burkhardt
2017	Fox	Joe Buck	John Smoltz	Ken Rosenthal and Tom Verducci	Kevin Burkhardt	Alex Rodriguez, David Ortiz, Keith Hernandez, and Frank Thomas	Kevin Burkhardt
2016	Fox	Joe Buck	John Smoltz	Ken Rosenthal and Tom Verducci	Kevin Burkhardt	Alex Rodriguez, Frank Thomas, Pete Rose, and Tom Verducci	Kevin Burkhardt
2015	Fox	Joe Buck	Harold Reynolds and Tom Verducci	Ken Rosenthal and Erin Andrews	Kevin Burkhardt	Alex Rodriguez, Raúl Ibañez, Frank Thomas, Pete Rose (Games 1–3), and Kevin Millar (Games 4–5)	Erin Andrews
2014	Fox	Joe Buck	Harold Reynolds and Tom Verducci	Ken Rosenthal and Erin Andrews	Kevin Burkhardt	Gabe Kapler, Frank Thomas, Nick Swisher, and David Ortiz (Games 1–2)	Erin Andrews
2013	Fox	Joe Buck	Tim McCarver	Ken Rosenthal and Erin Andrews	Matt Vasgersian	Harold Reynolds, Jimmy Rollins, and A. J. Pierzynski	Erin Andrews
2012	Fox	Joe Buck	Tim McCarver	Ken Rosenthal; Erin Andrews (Games 1–2, 4); Chris Myers (Game 3)	Matt Vasgersian	Harold Reynolds, Eric Karros, and A. J. Pierzynski	Erin Andrews
2011	Fox	Joe Buck	Tim McCarver	Ken Rosenthal	Chris Rose	Eric Karros and A. J. Pierzynski	Chris Rose
2010	Fox	Joe Buck	Tim McCarver	Ken Rosenthal	Chris Rose	Eric Karros and Ozzie Guillén	Chris Rose

==== Notes ====
- 2010 – For the second consecutive year, World Series games had earlier start times in hopes of attracting younger viewers. The first pitch was just before 8 p.m. EDT for Games 1–2, and 5, while Game 3 started at 7 p.m. EDT. Game 4, however, started at 8:22 p.m. EDT to accommodate Fox's coverage of an NFL game between the Tampa Bay Buccaneers and the Arizona Cardinals. Many viewers in the New York City and Philadelphia markets were unable to see Games 1 and 2 because News Corporation, Fox's parent company, pulled WNYW and WTXF from cable provider Cablevision on October 16 because of a carriage dispute. An agreement was reached just before Game 3.
  - MLB International syndicated its own telecast of the series, with announcers Gary Thorne and Rick Sutcliffe, to various networks outside the U.S. ESPN America broadcast the series live in the UK and in Europe. Additionally, the American Forces Network and Canadian Forces Radio and Television carried the games to U.S. and Canadian service personnel stationed around the globe. Fox Deportes carried the Series in Spanish on American cable and satellite TV.
  - The overall national Nielsen rating for the five games was 8.4, tied with the 2008 World Series for the event's lowest-ever TV rating. Game 4 was beaten in the ratings by a Pittsburgh Steelers-New Orleans Saints game on NBC Sunday Night Football, the first time a World Series game was outdrawn by a regular-season NFL contest airing in the same time slot.
- The 2011 World Series was televised in the United States and Canada by Fox. Joe Buck called play-byplay on his 14th World Series for the network, dating back to 1996, while color commentator Tim McCarver handled his 22nd World Series since 1985. Ken Rosenthal served as field reporter for the games, while Chris Rose hosted the pregame and postgame coverage with analysts A. J. Pierzynski and Eric Karros.
  - MLB International syndicated television coverage of the 2011 World Series (with Gary Thorne and Rick Sutcliffe announcing) to viewers outside of North America.
- In the United States, Fox televised the 2012 World Series, with Joe Buck calling play-by-play in his 15th World Series, and Tim McCarver handling color commentary for his 23rd World Series. Ken Rosenthal also appeared on the Fox telecasts as a field reporter, with Erin Andrews and Chris Myers joining him for select games.
  - MLB International syndicated its own telecast of the series, with announcers Gary Thorne and Rick Sutcliffe, to various networks outside the U.S. Additionally, the American Forces Network and Canadian Forces Radio and Television carried the games to U.S. and Canadian service personnel stationed around the globe. Fox Deportes carried the Series in Spanish on American cable and satellite TV.
  - On August 24, Tribune removed affiliate WTIC from Cablevision systems in Connecticut, causing viewers to miss Games 1 and 2 of the series. An agreement between Cablevision and Tribune was reached on October 26, the day before Game 3.
  - According to Nielsen Media Research, the four-game series on Fox averaged a record-low 7.6 rating and 12 share. The previous low was an 8.4 rating for both the 2008 and the 2010 World Series, which each went five games. The 6.1 rating in Game 3 matched the lowest rating for any World Series game with Game 3 in 2008; that year, a rain delay moved the start of the game to after 10 p.m. on the East Coast with the game not ending until 1:47 a.m.
- The 2013 World Series was Tim McCarver's final World Series as a broadcaster, as he announced that he would retire from national broadcasting after the season. He continued calling select local St. Louis Cardinals games until 2022. A partnership with Fox Sports featured Pearl Jam as the November artist of the month for all entities within the Fox Sports domain and license 48 songs from their catalog to play during the 2013 World Series. Their music was included in anything from "opening teases and commercial bumpers to montages, as well as additional promotional inventory across Fox prime-time and cable."
  - Major League Baseball International syndicated the television coverage outside Canada and the U.S., with English-language commentary provided by Baltimore Orioles play-by-play announcer Gary Thorne and ESPN analyst Rick Sutcliffe.
- 2014 World Series – Fox Deportes offered a Spanish-language telecast of the series, with Pablo Alsina, Duaner Sánchez, and José Tolentino commentating. MLB International televised the series outside the U.S. and Canada, with Gary Thorne and Rick Sutcliffe announcing.
  - The World Series started on a Tuesday for the first time since 1990, instead of a Wednesday as in previous years. The change also meant that the series only had to compete with the National Football League on one night (Sunday) instead of three (Thursday, Sunday, and Monday).
  - The 2014 World Series averaged an 8.3/14 rating, making it the second-worst-rated World Series in Major League Baseball history. Through six games, the series was averaging 7.4, which would have made it the worst-rated World Series, but Game 7 produced a respectable 13.7 to bolster the series average enough to avoid the notorious distinction. The 2014 World Series set records for lowest-rated Games 1, 4, 5, 6, and 7 in World Series history. The previous Game 7 in World Series history occurred in 2011, when the St. Louis Cardinals and Texas Rangers produced a 14.7 rating, a full 1.0 over 2014's Game 7. 2014 is the 5th consecutive year in which the World Series rating was under 10.0 and the 6th in the last 7th.
- 2015 – Fox suffered an outage during their broadcast of Game 1, resulting in a loss of coverage for 15 minutes, followed a 5-minute delay in-game while officials addressed the availability of video review due to the loss of Fox's feed. The teams agreed to allow the use of footage from MLB International's world feed of the game for video review, while Fox also temporarily switched to the MLB International feed with Matt Vasgersian and John Smoltz, later replaced by Joe Buck, Harold Reynolds, and Tom Verducci before the main Fox Sports production was restored.
- Fox Deportes also aired the 2016 World Series and provided a Spanish-language simulcast over-the-air via Fox's SAP audio, with Carlos Álvarez and Duaner Sánchez announcing. Sportsnet in English and RDS in French televised the series in Canada. Sportsnet used the MLB International feed produced by the MLB Network; Matt Vasgersian was MLB International's play-by-play announcer with the Toronto Blue Jays' play-by-play announcer Buck Martinez as their color commentator and MLB Network correspondent Lauren Shehadi and analyst Mark DeRosa as field reporters. Alain Usereau and former Montreal Expos player Marc Griffin handled the French-language telecast for RDS. BT Sport televised the series live in the United Kingdom and Ireland. WAPA-TV transmitted the series to Puerto Rico, with Rafael Bracero at the helm of the station's sports commentary of the series.
  - Initial reports often utilize "fast national" ratings, which are subject to revision. Game 7 had over 40 million viewers, the largest audience for a baseball game since Game 7 of the 1991 World Series, while the series as a whole was the first to average double-digit ratings nationally since 2009.

=== 2000s ===
Year	Network	Play-by-play	Color commentator(s)	Field reporter(s)	Pregame hosts	Pregame analysts	Trophy presentation
2009	Fox	Joe Buck	Tim McCarver	Ken Rosenthal and Mark Grace	Chris Rose	Eric Karros, Mark Grace, and Ozzie Guillén	Chris Rose
2008	Fox	Joe Buck	Tim McCarver	Chris Myers and Ken Rosenthal	Jeanne Zelasko	Kevin Kennedy; Mark Grace (in Tampa Bay); Eric Karros (in Philadelphia)	Jeanne Zelasko
2007	Fox	Joe Buck	Tim McCarver	Chris Myers and Ken Rosenthal	Jeanne Zelasko	Kevin Kennedy; Eric Byrnes and Eric Karros (in Boston); Joe Girardi and Mark Grace (in Denver)	Jeanne Zelasko
2006	Fox	Joe Buck	Tim McCarver	Chris Myers and Ken Rosenthal	Jeanne Zelasko	Kevin Kennedy; Eric Byrnes (in Detroit); Joe Girardi (in St. Louis)	Jeanne Zelasko
2005	Fox	Joe Buck	Tim McCarver	Chris Myers	Jeanne Zelasko	Kevin Kennedy	Jeanne Zelasko
2004	Fox	Joe Buck	Tim McCarver	Chris Myers	Jeanne Zelasko	Kevin Kennedy	Jeanne Zelasko
2003	Fox	Joe Buck	Tim McCarver	Steve Lyons	Jeanne Zelasko	Kevin Kennedy	Jeanne Zelasko
2002	Fox	Joe Buck	Tim McCarver	Steve Lyons	Jeanne Zelasko	Kevin Kennedy	Jeanne Zelasko
2001	Fox	Joe Buck	Tim McCarver	Steve Lyons	Jeanne Zelasko	Kevin Kennedy	Jeanne Zelasko
2000	Fox	Joe Buck	Tim McCarver and Bob Brenly	Steve Lyons and Keith Olbermann	Keith Olbermann	Steve Lyons	Keith Olbermann

==== Notes ====
- The 2000 World Series telecast on Fox was the first year of their exclusive coverage of the World Series (although the new contract technically began the next year). As in previous World Series televised by the network, Joe Buck called the play-by-play, with Tim McCarver (himself a Yankees broadcaster and a former Mets broadcaster) and Bob Brenly (who was an on-field analyst) serving as color commentators. This World Series was Brenly's last broadcast for Fox, as he left to become manager of the Arizona Diamondbacks and, incidentally, go on to defeat the New York Yankees in the World Series the following year. Brenly returned to broadcasting in 2005 as part of the Chicago Cubs broadcasts on NBC Sports Chicago and WGN, and also has called postseason games for TBS.
- 2001 – For the second consecutive year, Fox carried the World Series over its network with its top broadcast team, Joe Buck and Tim McCarver (himself a former New York Yankees broadcaster). This was the first year of Fox's exclusive rights to the World Series (in the previous contract, Fox only broadcast the World Series in even-numbered years while NBC broadcast it in odd-numbered years), which it has held ever since (this particular contract also had given Fox exclusive rights to the entire baseball postseason, which aired over its family of networks; the contract was modified following Disney's purchase of Fox Family Channel shortly after the World Series ended, as ESPN regained their postseason rights following a year of postseason games on ABC Family, Fox Family's successor).
- Fox's telecast of the 2002 World Series marked the first time the World Series was telecast in high-definition.
- The 2004 World Series was broadcast by Fox, and the announcers were Joe Buck and Tim McCarver. Jeanne Zelasko covered the pre-game build-up to all four games and the presentation of the World Series trophy.
  - An average of 23.1 million people watched Game 1. These were the highest television ratings for the opening game of a World Series in five years and had the highest average number of viewers since 1996. It was also the highest-rated broadcast on any network in the past ten months. The ratings for the first two games were also the highest average since 1996, and the average for the first three games was the highest since 1999. Game 3 had the highest average number of viewers with 24.4 million, since 1996 when 28.7 million watched the Atlanta Braves and New York Yankees. It was also the Fox network's highest rating for a Game 3 of a World Series ever. Game 4 posted an 18.2 national rating giving the series an overall average of 15.8. This was the highest average in five years, and the average number of viewers of 25.4 million, was the highest since 1995.
- 2006 – Games 1, 3 and 4 set all-time lows for television ratings, with Game 4 falling 20% from the previous year's Game 4. The Series as a whole was also the lowest-rated ever, with the four games averaging a Nielsen rating of only 10.0 and a share of 17. By contrast, the six games of the 1980 Series—in the pre-cable television era—garnered a record-high rating of 32.8 and a share of 56.
  - The starting time for each television broadcast was 8 pm EDT/6 pm MDT.
- 2007 – The starting time for each television broadcast was 8 pm EDT (6 pm MDT). The series broke with the recent tradition of starting the World Series on a Saturday, as Major League Baseball had become convinced that weekend games drew lower television ratings. Prior to this season, every World Series since 1985 had opened on a Saturday, with the exception of the 1990 World Series. Rogers Sportsnet (RSN) in Canada used the MLB International feed with Dave O'Brien and Rick Sutcliffe as booth announcers. NASN showed the games live to most of Europe, while in the United Kingdom, all games were shown terrestrially on Five. NHK aired the Series in Japan.
  - During Fox's broadcast of Game 3 of the 2007 World Series between the Colorado Rockies and Boston Red Sox, a blackout occurred during the top half of the seventh inning, resulting in the disruption of a key moment in the game.
- 2008 – All games were televised on Fox in the United States with Joe Buck and Tim McCarver (himself a former Philadelphia Phillies broadcaster) as booth announcers and Chris Myers and Ken Rosenthal as field reporters. Jeanne Zelasko hosted the pre-game and post-game show with Kevin Kennedy and Mark Grace (in Tampa) or Eric Karros (in Philadelphia). Fox Deportes did the simulcast of the Series in Spanish language with Ángel Torres, Miguel Morales and Cos Villa behind the microphones. Fox's broadcasts were also streamed online at MLB.com.
  - For international viewers, MLB International televised the game with commentators Rick Sutcliffe and Dave O'Brien. This feed was also carried to U.S. service personnel stationed around the globe via the American Forces Network.
  - Game 1 of the 2008 World Series was watched by 10.1 million viewers in the United States; Commissioner Bud Selig stated he was satisfied with the ratings. Overall viewership was 25% lower than the previous World Series.
  - Game 5 on October 27 was postponed after the top of the sixth inning due to rain. When the game finally resumed on October 29, the start of the game was delayed by 15 minutes so that a 30-minute paid advertisement for U.S. Democratic Presidential candidate Barack Obama could be aired on Fox, CBS, and NBC.
- Game 1 of the 2009 World Series was watched by 19.5 million viewers, second only to the opening of the 2004 World Series in viewership for a series opener since 2000. The viewership for the opening game resulted in a ratings percentage of 11.9% of households in the United States. Game 4 produced the highest ratings of the series with 22.8 million viewers, the highest for any World Series game since 2004 and the highest for a "non-decisive Game 4" since 2003.
  - Fox Deportes also broadcast the Series for the US Spanish-speaking audience.

=== 1990s ===
Year	Network	Play-by-play	Color commentator(s)	Field reporter(s)	Pregame hosts	Pregame analysts	Trophy presentation
1999	NBC	Bob Costas	Joe Morgan	Jim Gray and Craig Sager	Hannah Storm	Barry Larkin	Jim Gray
1998	Fox	Joe Buck	Tim McCarver and Bob Brenly	—N/a	Chip Caray	Steve Lyons	Chip Caray
1997	NBC	Bob Costas	Joe Morgan and Bob Uecker	Jim Gray and Keith Olbermann	Hannah Storm and Keith Olbermann	—N/a	Hannah Storm and Jim Gray
1996	Fox	Joe Buck	Tim McCarver and Bob Brenly	—N/a	Chip Caray	Steve Lyons and Dave Winfield	Chip Caray
1995	ABC (Games 1, 4–5)	Al Michaels	Jim Palmer and Tim McCarver	Lesley Visser	John Saunders	—N/a	
1995	NBC (Games 2–3, 6)	Bob Costas	Joe Morgan and Bob Uecker	Jim Gray	Hannah Storm	—N/a	Hannah Storm
1993	CBS (U.S.)	Sean McDonough	Tim McCarver	Lesley Visser and Jim Gray	Pat O'Brien	—N/a	Tim McCarver
1993	CTV (Canada)	Sean McDonough	Tim McCarver	Lesley Visser and Jim Gray	Pat O'Brien	—N/a	Tim McCarver
1992	CBS (U.S.)	Sean McDonough	Tim McCarver	Jim Kaat and Lesley Visser	Pat O'Brien	—N/a	Jim Kaat
1992	CTV (Canada)	Sean McDonough	Tim McCarver	Jim Kaat and Lesley Visser	Pat O'Brien	—N/a	Jim Kaat
1991	CBS	Jack Buck	Tim McCarver	Jim Kaat, Lesley Visser, and Andrea Joyce	Pat O'Brien	Tommy Lasorda (Games 1–2, 4–7)	Jim Kaat
1990	CBS	Jack Buck	Tim McCarver	Jim Kaat and Lesley Visser	Pat O'Brien	—N/a	Jim Kaat

==== Notes ====
- The 1990 postseason started on a Thursday, while World Series started on a Tuesday due to the brief lockout.
  - This was the first of four consecutive World Series to be televised on CBS. From 1976 to 1989, World Series telecasts alternated between ABC (in odd-numbered years) and NBC (in even-numbered years). For CBS' coverage of the 1990, 1991, and 1992 World Series, Jim Kaat provided periodic commentary on the field during the telecasts, but he was not in the booth with Jack Buck (for 1990 and 1991), Sean McDonough (for 1992), and Tim McCarver.
  - In 1990, CBS field reporter Lesley Visser became the first female sportscaster to cover a World Series.
- All World Series games from 1981 to 1996 were televised in Canada on CTV, using the feed from the US network broadcaster. This includes games involving the Toronto Blue Jays, which at the time were not allowed to produce their own broadcasts in the postseason.
- In 1991, CBS used three field reporters: Jim Kaat (both teams and covering the trophy presentation), Lesley Visser (Twins' dugout) and Andrea Joyce (Braves' dugout). This was also the last World Series to be broadcast by Jack Buck (who was replaced by Sean McDonough on the CBS telecasts in the role of lead play-by-play man).
  - The World Series telecast drew an overall national Nielsen rating of 24.0 and a 39 share for CBS. Game 7 drew a 32.2 rating and 49 shares; as of 2012, no subsequent World Series game has approached either number in national TV ratings.
- In 1992, at 30 years of age, CBS' Sean McDonough became the youngest man to call all nine innings and games of a World Series while serving as a full network television employee. Although Vin Scully and Al Michaels were several years younger when they called their first World Series, they were products of the then-broadcasting policy of announcers representing the participating teams (a process that ended following the 1976 World Series). McDonough's record was subsequently broken by Fox's Joe Buck, who at 27 years of age, called the 1996 World Series. Coincidentally, McDonough replaced Joe Buck's father, Jack, as CBS' lead play-by-play man.
- Game 6 of the 1993 World Series (October 23), is to date, the last Major League Baseball game to be televised on CBS. Sean McDonough (play-by-play) and Tim McCarver (color commentary and himself a former Phillies broadcaster) called the action for CBS. The following season, Major League Baseball entered into a revenue sharing joint venture with ABC and NBC called The Baseball Network. CBS' Andrea Joyce became the first woman to co-host (alongside Pat O'Brien) a World Series. Serving as field reporters for CBS were Lesley Visser (in the Blue Jays' dugout) and Jim Gray (in the Phillies' dugout).
- The 1995 World Series was broadcast on two networks (ABC and NBC) so that they could recoup losses in the aftermath of the 1994–95 strike. The arrangement was a compromise from both networks, which chose to opt out of a six-year revenue-sharing deal with Major League Baseball called "The Baseball Network." Prior to the strike, ABC was scheduled to broadcast the 1994 World Series and NBC was scheduled to televise the 1995 World Series. For 1995, ABC and NBC alternated games; ABC covered Games 1, 4, and 5 (and would have aired Game 7 if it was needed due to them winning the coin toss), while NBC covered Games 2, 3, and 6. Game 5 was also, to date, the last World Series game broadcast on ABC.
  - Also during the 1995 World Series, NBC's Hannah Storm was the first woman to serve as solo host of a World Series, and the first to preside over a World Series trophy presentation.
- For Game 2 of the 1996 World Series (rescheduled to Monday night due to a rainout), Fox used an early start (7 p.m. Eastern Time) to minimize the overlap with Monday Night Football on ABC.
  - The Atlanta Braves became the first Major League Baseball team to appear in World Series broadcast on all four major networks (NBC in 1957–1958 and 1995, ABC in 1995, CBS in 1991–1992, and Fox in 1996. The Philadelphia Phillies have since duplicated this feat (NBC in 1950 and 1980, ABC in 1983, CBS in 1993 and Fox in 2008–2009).
- 1997 – This marked the first time since 1988 that NBC televised a World Series in its entirety. In 1995, NBC televised Games 2, 3, and 6, while rival ABC televised Games 1, 4, and 5, having split that series since ABC was promised the strike-cancelled 1994 World Series. Both networks had announced prior to the 1995 season, that they were bailing out what was initially, a six-year-long revenue sharing joint venture with Major League Baseball called "The Baseball Network". NBC's West Coast president Don Ohlmeyer disturbed Major League Baseball when he publicly wished the World Series to end in a four-game sweep so that it wouldn't derail NBC's fall entertainment schedule. (Game 5 fell on a Thursday, which had long been the highest rated night on NBC's schedule, if not on all of television.)
  - Game 7 of the 1997 World Series caused a scheduled Chicago Bears-Miami Dolphins game to be postponed to Monday night. It was seen on ABC only in the Chicago and Miami markets and was intended to air on Fox. The rest of the United States received the scheduled Green Bay Packers–New England Patriots game, the only time a rematch of a previous season's Super Bowl aired on ABC.
- The 1999 World Series was NBC's 39th and, to date, final World Series telecast. Fox aired the next World Series as part of the contract in place, and Fox acquired the exclusive broadcast rights of Major League Baseball beginning in 2001. With the Knicks having played in the NBA Finals in June, this was the second championship series in 1999 that NBC broadcast involving teams from New York. Bob Costas, Jim Gray, and Hannah Storm were involved both times. Costas with play-by-play, Gray as a reporter, and Storm as pre-game host. Prior to Cleveland in 2016, this was the most recent year of the same city hosting both the NBA Finals and World Series in the same year.\

=== 1980s ===
Year	Network	Play-by-play	Color commentator(s)/Secondary play-by-play	Field reporter(s)	Pregame host	Pregame analysts	Trophy presentation
1989	ABC	Al Michaels	Jim Palmer and Tim McCarver	Gary Thorne and Joe Morgan	Al Michaels	Jim Palmer and Tim McCarver	Gary Thorne
1988	NBC	Vin Scully	Joe Garagiola	Bob Costas and Marv Albert		—N/a	Bob Costas
1987	ABC	Al Michaels	Jim Palmer and Tim McCarver	Reggie Jackson and Gary Bender	Al Michaels	Jim Palmer and Tim McCarver	Reggie Jackson
1986	NBC	Vin Scully	Joe Garagiola	Bob Costas and Marv Albert		—N/a	Bob Costas
1985	ABC	Al Michaels	Jim Palmer and Tim McCarver	Reggie Jackson	Al Michaels	Reggie Jackson	
1984	NBC	Vin Scully	Joe Garagiola	Bob Costas and Len Berman		—N/a	Bob Costas
1983	ABC	Al Michaels	Howard Cosell and Earl Weaver	Reggie Jackson and Tim Brant	Howard Cosell	Reggie Jackson	
1982	NBC	Joe Garagiola and Dick Enberg	Tony Kubek	Bob Costas and Byron Day	Dick Enberg	Tom Seaver	Bob Costas
1981	ABC	Keith Jackson (in New York); Al Michaels (in Los Angeles)	Howard Cosell and Jim Palmer	Bob Uecker and Jim Lampley	Howard Cosell	Jim Palmer	Bob Uecker
1980	NBC	Joe Garagiola	Tony Kubek and Tom Seaver	Merle Harmon	Bryant Gumbel	Bob Gibson and Ron Luciano	Bryant Gumbel

==== Notes ====
- 1980 – Locally, the NBC feed was carried in Philadelphia by WPHL-TV, the Phillies' flagship TV station, and KYW-TV, the Philadelphia NBC station; and in Kansas City by WDAF-TV, the Royals' flagship TV station as well as the Kansas City NBC station.
  - This series is tied with the 1978 World Series for the highest overall television ratings to date, with the six games averaging a Nielsen rating of 32.8 and a share of 56.
  - Although Bryant Gumbel anchored NBC's pregame coverage for Game 5 of the series, he was not present at Kansas City's Royals Stadium. Game 5 landed on a Sunday, which created conflict with Gumbel's NFL '80 hosting duties. As a result, Gumbel had to anchor the World Series coverage from NBC's studios in New York City. Gumbel however, would be present in Philadelphia's Veterans Stadium for Game 6, which turned out to be the clincher for the Phillies.
- 1981 – Locally, the ABC feed was carried in Los Angeles by KTTV, the Dodgers' flagship TV station, and KABC-TV, the Los Angeles ABC station; and in New York by WPIX, the Yankees' flagship TV station, and WABC-TV, the New York City ABC station.
- 1982 – Locally, the NBC feed was carried in St. Louis by KSDK, the Cardinals' flagship station as well as the St. Louis NBC station; and in Milwaukee by WVTV, the Brewers' flagship TV station, and WTMJ-TV, the Milwaukee NBC station.
  - Dick Enberg and Joe Garagiola traded off play-by-play duties (just as Garagiola and Tony Kubek had done for NBC's previous two World Series broadcasts). Garagiola called the first three and last three innings of each game. Enberg, meanwhile, hosted the pregame show and then called the middle innings.
- 1983 – Locally, the ABC feed was carried in Baltimore by WMAR-TV, the Orioles' flagship TV station, and WJZ-TV, the Baltimore ABC station; and in Philadelphia by WTAF-TV, the Phillies' flagship TV station, and WPVI-TV, the Philadelphia ABC station. (This was the last year in which the participating teams' regular-season flagship TV stations were permitted to simulcast the World Series network feed even if they were not affiliated with that network. Beginning in 1984 the network affiliates would have Series exclusivity in every city.)
  - This was the last World Series aired on ABC before the network was taken over by Capital Cities Communications (coincidentally, that company's flagship station was Philadelphia's ABC affiliate, WPVI-TV—also the network's first affiliate).
  - Earl Weaver was ABC's lead baseball analyst in 1983, but was also employed by the Baltimore Orioles as a consultant. At the time, ABC had a policy preventing an announcer who was employed by a team from working games involving that team. So whenever the Orioles were on the primary ABC game (ABC during this period, broadcast Monday night games), Weaver worked the backup game. This policy forced Weaver to resign from the Orioles' consulting position in October in order to be able to work the Series telecasts for ABC.
- The 1984 World Series was scheduled to start in the National League park. But Major League Baseball actually had a contingency plan to instead start the World Series in the American League park in the event that the Chicago Cubs won the National League Championship Series against the San Diego Padres. This would have allowed the Wrigley Field-hosted (i.e. daytime) games to be held over the weekend. In return, only one prime time game (Game 3 on Friday) would have been lost. Wrigley Field wouldn't have lights installed until four years later. In other words, had the Cubs advanced to the Series instead of the Padres, the Detroit Tigers would have hosted Games 1–2, and 6–7 (on Tuesday and Wednesday nights), while the Cubs would have hosted Games 3–5 (on Friday, Saturday and Sunday), with all three games in Chicago starting no later than 1:30 p.m. Central Time.
- 1985 marked the first time that all World Series games were aired in prime time. Since 1985 marked the first year of the League Championship Series having a best-of-seven format, Game 1 started on a Saturday. Tim McCarver (who was originally slated to be a roving World Series reporter) was practically a last minute replacement for Howard Cosell on ABC's coverage. Cosell was removed from the telecasts on the eve of the World Series (October 18), by order of Jim Spence and Roone Arledge (the then Vice President and President of ABC Sports respectively) after the excerpts from Cosell's book (I Never Played the Game), which criticized colleagues at ABC, first appeared in TV Guide.
- 1986 – NBC preceded its broadcast of Game 5 by airing an episode of The Cosby Show (at the time the network's top-rated prime time series) in lieu of a pregame show.
  - Vin Scully's call of the final play in Game 6 would quickly become an iconic one to baseball fans, with the normally calm Scully growing increasingly excited:
    So the winning run is at second base, with two outs, three and two to Mookie Wilson. [A] little roller up along first... behind the bag! It gets through Buckner! Here comes Knight, and the Mets win it!
    Scully then remained silent for more than three minutes, letting the pictures and the crowd noise tell the story. Scully resumed with:
    If one picture is worth a thousand words, you have seen about a million words, but more than that, you have seen an absolutely bizarre finish to Game 6 of the 1986 World Series. The Mets are not only alive, they are well, and they will play the Red Sox in Game 7 tomorrow!
  - Game 6 caused the first-ever preemption of Saturday Night Live, due to extra innings. Ron Darling explained that when the Mets entered the locker room, they were informed to their dismay that they'd inadvertently caused the first delay in SNL's (then) 11-year history; the delayed episode was aired two weeks later on November 8.
  - NBC's broadcast of Game 7 (which went up against a Monday Night Football game between the Washington Redskins and New York Giants on ABC) garnered a Nielsen rating of 38.9 and a 55 share, making it the highest-rated single World Series game to date. Game 7 was scheduled for Sunday, but a rain-out forced the game to Monday.
- Game 6 of the 1987 World Series (played on Saturday, October 24) was the last World Series game to not be played in prime time (ironically, the game was played in the Metrodome even though it took place under artificial illumination all the same). The game started at 4 p.m. Eastern Time. Another weekend afternoon, the sixth game was planned for 1988, but since the World Series ended in five games, it was unnecessary.
  - Game 7 of the 1987 World Series (which was also broadcast by ABC), which featured the Minnesota Twins, had to play at the Hubert H. Humphrey Metrodome caused a scheduled Denver Broncos-Minnesota game, originally scheduled on October 26, to be postponed to Monday night, October 27. Consequently, it was seen on ABC only in the Colorado and Minnesota areas as part of ABC's Monday Night Football package. Meanwhile, the rest of the United States saw the previously scheduled game: Los Angeles Rams at Cleveland.
- The 1988 World Series marked the last time that NBC would televise a World Series for seven years. Beginning in 1990, NBC was shut out of Major League Baseball coverage completely, after CBS signed a four-year, exclusive television contract. After splitting coverage of the 1995 World Series with ABC, NBC would next cover a World Series exclusively in 1997.
  - Longtime Los Angeles Dodgers' broadcaster Vin Scully called the 1988 World Series for a national television audience on NBC with Joe Garagiola. Unknown to the fans and the media at the time, Kirk Gibson was watching the game on television while undergoing physical therapy in the Dodgers' clubhouse. At some point during the game, television cameras scanned the Dodgers dugout and Scully, observed that Gibson was nowhere to be found. This spurred Gibson to tell Dodgers manager Tommy Lasorda that he was available to pinch hit. Gibson immediately returned to the batting cage in the clubhouse to take practice swings. Bob Costas, who along with Marv Albert, hosted NBC's World Series pregame coverage and handled postgame interviews made on-air statements that enraged many in the Dodgers' clubhouse (especially manager Tommy Lasorda). After the Dodgers won Game 4, Lasorda (during a postgame interview with Marv Albert) sarcastically said that the MVP of the World Series should be Bob Costas. While Kirk Gibson was taking practice swings in the Dodgers' clubhouse during Game 1, Orel Hershiser set up the hitting tee for his teammate. Along the way, Costas could hear Gibson's agonized-sounding grunts after every hit. Costas said that the 1988 Dodgers possibly had the weakest hitting line-up in World Series history.
    - The following is Vin Scully's call of Kirk Gibson's game-winning home run in Game 1 of the 1988 World Series:
      All year long, they looked to him to light the fire, and all year long, he answered the demands, until he was physically unable to start tonight–with two bad legs: The bad left hamstring, and the swollen right knee. And, with two out, you talk about a roll of the dice... this is it.
      Scully made repeated references to Gibson's legs, noting at one point that the batter was "shaking his left leg, making it quiver, like a horse trying to get rid of a troublesome fly." Gibson worked the count to 3–2 as Mike Davis stole second base; the camera turned at that point to Steve Sax getting ready for his turn at the plate, and Scully reminded the viewers that Sax waiting on deck but the game right now is at the plate. He then said:
      High fly ball into right field, she i-i-i-is... GONE!!!
      Scully said nothing for over a minute, allowing the pictures to tell the story. Finally, he said:
      In a year that has been so improbable... the impossible has happened!
      Returning to the subject of Gibson's banged-up legs during a replay, Scully joked,
      And, now, the only question was, could he make it around the base paths unassisted?! You know, I said it once before, a few days ago, that Kirk Gibson was not the Most Valuable Player; that the Most Valuable Player for the Dodgers was Tinkerbell. But, tonight, I think Tinkerbell backed off for Kirk Gibson. And, look at Eckersley – shocked to his toes! They are going wild at Dodger Stadium – no one wants to leave!
      As NBC showed a replay of Gibson rounding second base in his home run trot, Scully then made a point to note Eckersley's pitching performance throughout the 1988 season, to put things in perspective.
      Dennis Eckersley allowed five home runs all year. And we'll be back.
  - Game 1 of the 1988 World Series was also notable for an unexpected hijack at Macon, Georgia's NBC station WMGT-TV when the video portion of the second inning was hijacked with a black-and-white adult movie for ten seconds while the audio portion of the game was still in play. The station's manager reported the sudden hijack to the Federal Communications Commission who later reported a few days after the hijack that a former technician, who was fired from the station a short time after, accidentally flipped the wrong switch in the station's master control panel which send the video portion directly from NBC's KU-Band signal to one of the station's C-Band satellite dish.
- Game 3 of the 1989 World Series (initially scheduled for October 17) was delayed by 10 days due to the Loma Prieta earthquake. The earthquake struck at approximately 5:04 p.m. Pacific Time. After about a 15-minute delay (ABC aired a rerun of Roseanne and subsequently, The Wonder Years in the meantime), ABC was able to regain power via a backup generator. ABC's play-by-play man, Al Michaels (who was familiar with the San Francisco Bay Area dating back to his days working for the San Francisco Giants from 1974–1976) then proceeded to relay reports to Ted Koppel at ABC News' headquarters in Washington, D.C. Al Michaels was ultimately nominated for an Emmy for his on-site reporting at the World Series. NBC News also began continuous coverage, with Tom Brokaw, about an hour later. KGO-TV, an owned and operated station of the American Broadcasting Company, later won a Peabody Award for their news coverage, as did radio station KCBS (AM). In Los Angeles, also an ABC owned and operated station KABC chose not to air the network feed. It aired its own coverage, anchored by Mark Coogan. However, some network footage was incorporated into its coverage.
  - This was the last World Series that ABC televised from start to finish (and also the last they would produce themselves) and the last MLB game on ABC, period, until July 1994. The television rights would move exclusively (ABC had shared coverage with NBC since 1976 up until the end of the 1989 season) to CBS the following year. ABC would next televise a World Series in 1995, but only broadcast Games 1, 4, and 5 (the other games were covered by NBC, who had a joint venture with ABC and MLB called The Baseball Network). Due in part to the earthquake and subsequent interruption of play, combined with the four-game sweep by the A's, ABC only drew an overall Nielsen rating of 16.4 for the Series. This was the first World Series since the introduction of prime-time games in 1971 to draw a rating of less than 20.

=== 1970s ===
Year	Network	Play-by-play	Color commentator(s)/Secondary play-by-play	Field reporter(s)	Pregame host	Pregame analyst(s)	Trophy presentation
1979	ABC	Keith Jackson (in Baltimore); Al Michaels (in Pittsburgh)	Don Drysdale and Howard Cosell	—N/a	Howard Cosell	—N/a	Don Drysdale
1978	NBC	Joe Garagiola	Tony Kubek and Tom Seaver	—N/a	Curt Gowdy	—N/a	Tony Kubek
1977	ABC	Keith Jackson	Howard Cosell and Tom Seaver	—N/a	Bill White (in New York); Ross Porter (in Los Angeles)	—N/a	Bill White
1976	NBC	Joe Garagiola	Tony Kubek; Marty Brennaman (in Cincinnati); Phil Rizzuto (in New York)	—N/a	Joe Garagiola	—N/a	Tony Kubek
1975	NBC	Curt Gowdy (Games 1, 3, 5, 7); Joe Garagiola (Games 2, 4, 6)	Tony Kubek; Dick Stockton (Games 1, 6); Ned Martin (Games 2, 7); Marty Brennaman (in Cincinnati)	—N/a	Joe Garagiola	—N/a	Tony Kubek and Marty Brennaman
1974	NBC	Curt Gowdy	Tony Kubek; Vin Scully (in Los Angeles); Monte Moore (in Oakland)	—N/a	Joe Garagiola	—N/a	Tony Kubek and Monte Moore
1973	NBC	Curt Gowdy	Tony Kubek; Monte Moore (in Oakland); Lindsey Nelson (in New York)	—N/a	Joe Garagiola	—N/a	Tony Kubek and Monte Moore
1972	NBC	Curt Gowdy	Tony Kubek; Al Michaels (in Cincinnati); Monte Moore (in Oakland)	—N/a	Joe Garagiola	—N/a	Tony Kubek and Monte Moore
1971	NBC	Curt Gowdy	Chuck Thompson (in Baltimore); Bob Prince (in Pittsburgh)	Tony Kubek	Joe Garagiola	Sandy Koufax	Bob Prince
1970	NBC	Curt Gowdy	Jim McIntyre (in Cincinnati); Chuck Thompson (in Baltimore)	Tony Kubek	Joe Garagiola	Sandy Koufax and Mickey Mantle	Chuck Thompson

==== Notes ====
- 1970 – Locally, the NBC feed was carried in Baltimore by WJZ-TV, the Orioles' flagship TV station, and WBAL-TV, the Baltimore NBC station; and in Cincinnati by WLWT, the Reds' flagship TV station as well as the Cincinnati NBC station.
- 1971 – Locally, the NBC feed was carried in Pittsburgh by KDKA-TV, the Pirates' flagship TV station, and WIIC, the Pittsburgh NBC station; and in Baltimore by WJZ-TV, the Orioles' flagship TV station, and WBAL-TV, the Baltimore NBC station.
  - Game 4 of the 1971 World Series was the first World Series game to be aired in prime time.
- 1972 – Locally, the NBC feed was carried in Oakland by KBHK-TV, the Athletics' flagship TV station, and KRON-TV, the Bay Area NBC station; and in Cincinnati by WLWT, the Reds' flagship TV station as well as the Cincinnati NBC station.
  - After having been used as an in-the-stands reporter for NBC's Series coverage since 1968, Tony Kubek was promoted to the booth as a color commentator for the telecasts, becoming the first former player to serve in this capacity since Joe Garagiola in 1961.
  - NBC aired the soap opera Return to Peyton Place prior to game 5, the first time that NBC had skipped the pregame show before a Series game (a move the network would not repeat until 1986 with The Cosby Show). This move was necessitated by the fact that Game 3 was rained out, forcing Game 5 to be played on a Friday, originally scheduled as a travel day.
- 1973 – Locally, the NBC feed was carried in New York by WOR-TV, the Mets' flagship TV station, and WNBC-TV, the New York City NBC station; and in Oakland by KTVU, the Athletics' flagship TV station, and KRON-TV, the Bay Area NBC station.
- 1974 – Locally, the NBC feed was carried in Oakland by KTVU, the Athletics' flagship TV station, and KRON-TV, the Bay Area NBC station; and in Los Angeles by KTTV, the Dodgers' flagship TV station, and KNBC-TV, the Los Angeles NBC station.
- 1975 – Locally, the NBC feed was carried in Cincinnati by WLWT, the Reds' flagship TV station as well as the Cincinnati NBC station; and in Boston by WSBK-TV, the Red Sox' flagship TV station, and WBZ-TV, the Boston NBC station.
- 1976 – Locally, the NBC feed was carried in New York by WPIX, the Yankees' flagship TV station, and WNBC-TV, the New York City NBC station; and in Cincinnati by WLWT, the Reds' flagship TV station as well as the Cincinnati NBC station.
- 1977 – Locally, the ABC feed was carried in Los Angeles by KTTV, the Dodgers' flagship TV station, and KABC-TV, the Los Angeles ABC station; and in New York by WPIX, the Yankees' flagship TV station, and WABC-TV, the New York City ABC station.
  - Beginning in 1977 the participating teams' local announcers were no longer featured as booth announcers on the network telecast of a World Series.
  - Also in 1977, Yankees announcer Bill White and Dodgers announcer Ross Porter split pre-game and post-game duties on ABC, with White working the telecasts for the games in New York (including the clubhouse trophy presentation ceremony after Game 6) and Porter doing likewise for the games in Los Angeles. (The pair also worked on CBS Radio's coverage of the Series, with Porter doing play-by-play of the games in New York and White the games in Los Angeles.)
- 1978 – Locally, the NBC feed was carried in New York by WPIX, the Yankees' flagship TV station, and WNBC-TV, the New York City NBC station; and in Los Angeles by KTTV, the Dodgers' flagship TV station, and KNBC-TV, the Los Angeles NBC station.
- 1979 – Locally, the ABC feed was carried in Pittsburgh by KDKA-TV, the Pirates' flagship TV station, and WTAE-TV, the Pittsburgh ABC station; and in Baltimore by WMAR-TV, the Orioles' flagship TV station, and WJZ-TV, the Baltimore ABC station.
  - During ABC's coverage in 1979 and 1981, Keith Jackson and Al Michaels alternated the play-by-play, Jackson calling the games at the American League park and Michaels working those at the National League park. This arrangement was made in large part to work around Jackson's already-busy schedule (which included being ABC's lead college football announcer). By 1983, Michaels was promoted to the full-time play-by-play role.

=== 1960s ===
Year	Network	Play-by-play	Color commentator(s)/Secondary play-by-play	Field reporter(s)	Pregame hosts	Pregame analysts	Trophy presentation
1969	NBC	Curt Gowdy	Bill O'Donnell (in Baltimore); Lindsey Nelson (in New York)	Tony Kubek	Jim Simpson	Sandy Koufax and Mickey Mantle	Lindsey Nelson
1968	NBC	Curt Gowdy	Harry Caray (in St. Louis); George Kell (in Detroit)	Tony Kubek	Jim Simpson	Sandy Koufax	Ernie Harwell
1967	NBC	Curt Gowdy	Ken Coleman (in Boston); Harry Caray (in St. Louis)	—N/a	Jim Simpson	Sandy Koufax (Games 1, 3–7); Pee Wee Reese and Tony Kubek (Game 2)	Harry Caray
1966	NBC	Curt Gowdy	Vin Scully (in Los Angeles); Chuck Thompson (in Baltimore)	—N/a	Jim Simpson	Harry Walker and Alvin Dark	Chuck Thompson
1965	NBC	Ray Scott and Vin Scully		—N/a	Bob Wolff	Joe Garagiola	Vin Scully
1964	NBC	Harry Caray and Curt Gowdy (in St. Louis); Phil Rizzuto and Joe Garagiola (in New York)		—N/a	Bob Wolff	Joe Garagiola	Harry Caray
1963	NBC	Mel Allen and Vin Scully		—N/a	Bob Wolff	Joe Garagiola	Vin Scully
1962	NBC	Russ Hodges and Mel Allen		—N/a	Bob Wolff	Joe Garagiola	Mel Allen
1961	NBC	Mel Allen	Joe Garagiola	—N/a			Mel Allen
1960	NBC	Bob Prince and Mel Allen		—N/a			Bob Prince

==== Notes ====
- 1960 – Locally, the NBC feed was carried in New York by WPIX, the Yankees' flagship TV station, and WNBC-TV, the New York City NBC affiliate; and in Pittsburgh by WIIC, the Pittsburgh NBC affiliate.
  - As mentioned several times here, prior to the mid-1970s, television networks and stations generally didn't preserve their telecasts of sporting events, choosing instead to tape over them. As a result, the broadcasts of six of the seven 1960 games are no longer known to exist. The lone exception is a black-and-white kinescope of the entire telecast of Game 7, which was discovered in a wine cellar in Bing Crosby's home in Hillsborough, California in December 2009. A part-owner of the Pittsburgh Pirates, who was too superstitious to watch the Series live, Crosby listened to the decisive contest with his wife Kathryn and two friends on a shortwave radio in Paris, France. Wanting to watch the game at a later date only if the Pirates won, he arranged for a company to record it. After viewing the kinescope, he placed it in his wine cellar, where it went untouched for 49 years. It was finally found by Robert Bader, vice president of marketing and production for Bing Crosby Enterprises, while looking through videotapes of Crosby's television specials which were to be transferred to DVD. The five-reel set is the only known complete copy of the historic match, which was originally broadcast in color. The NBC television announcers for the Series were Bob Prince and Mel Allen, the primary play-by-play voices for the Pirates and New York Yankees respectively. Prince called the first half of Game 7, while Allen did the rest of the game.
- 1961 – Locally, the NBC feed was carried in Cincinnati by WLWT, the Reds' flagship TV station as well as the Cincinnati NBC affiliate; and in New York by WPIX, the Yankees' flagship TV station, and WNBC-TV, the New York City NBC affiliate.
  - In contrast to preceding years, in which NBC's World Series telecasts featured two announcers (usually one from each participating team) who split the play-by-play, each working his portion of the game by himself, in 1961 NBC had Yankees announcer Mel Allen handle all of the play-by-play on television (with Reds announcer Waite Hoyt confined to radio) while Joe Garagiola provided color commentary. This format eventually became the standard form of presentation on World Series telecasts. Garagiola did call play-by-play of the ninth inning in Game 5, however, as Allen went to the victorious Yankees' clubhouse to conduct postgame interviews.
- 1962 – Locally, the NBC feed was carried in New York by WPIX, the Yankees' flagship TV station, and WNBC-TV, the New York City NBC affiliate; and in San Francisco by KTVU-TV, the Giants' flagship TV station, and KRON-TV, the San Francisco NBC affiliate.
- 1963 – Locally, the NBC feed was carried in Los Angeles by KTTV, the Dodgers' flagship TV station, and KNBC, the Los Angeles NBC affiliate; and in New York by WPIX, the Yankees' flagship TV station, and WNBC-TV, the New York City NBC affiliate.
  - During the fourth and final game of the series, Yankees announcer Mel Allen was calling the top of the ninth inning for NBC when his voice gave out due to a bout of severe laryngitis, forcing Dodgers announcer Vin Scully (who had called the first four-and-a-half innings of the game per the network's usual setup) to resume play-by-play duties for the remainder of the game. After the Series New York Daily News sportswriter Dick Young opined that Allen, the voice of the Yankees, had been stricken by "psychosomatic laryngitis" caused by his team being swept.
- 1964 – Locally, the NBC feed was carried in New York by WPIX, the Yankees' flagship TV station, and WNBC-TV, the New York City NBC affiliate; and in St. Louis by KSD-TV, the Cardinals' flagship TV station as well as the St. Louis NBC affiliate.
  - In 1964, the Yankees made the World Series for the 15th time in 19 years—but Mel Allen wasn't there. Back in September, before the end of the season, the Yankees informed Allen that his contract with the team would not be renewed. In those days, the main announcers for the series participants were always called the World Series on NBC. Although Allen was thus technically eligible to call the Series, Baseball Commissioner Ford Frick honored the Yankees' request to have Phil Rizzuto join the Series crew instead. It was the first time Allen had missed a World Series for which the Yankees were eligible since 1943, and only the second World Series (not counting those missed during World War II) that he'd missed since he began calling baseball games in 1938. On December 17, after much media speculation and many letters to the Yankees from fans disgruntled at Allen's absence from the Series, the Yankees issued a terse press release announcing Allen's firing; he was replaced by Joe Garagiola, who'd teamed with Rizzuto on the Series. NBC and Movietone dropped him soon afterward. To this day, the Yankees have never given an explanation for Allen's sudden firing, and rumors abounded. Depending on the rumor, Allen was either homosexual, an alcoholic, a drug addict, or had suffered a nervous breakdown. Allen's sexuality was sometimes a target in those more conservative days because he hadn't married (and never did). Years later, Allen told author Curt Smith that the Yankees had fired him under pressure from the team's longtime sponsor, Ballantine Beer. According to Allen, he was fired as a cost-cutting move by Ballantine, which had been experiencing poor sales for years (it would eventually be sold in 1969). Smith, in his book Voices of Summer, also indicated that the medications Allen took in order to maintain his busy schedule may have affected his on-air performance. (Stephen Borelli, another biographer, has also pointed out that Allen's heavy workload didn't allow him time to take care of his health.)
- 1965 – Locally, the NBC feed was carried in Los Angeles by KTTV, the Dodgers' flagship TV station, and KNBC, the Los Angeles NBC affiliate; and in Minnesota by WTCN-TV, the Twins' flagship TV station, and KSTP-TV, the Twin Cities NBC affiliate.
- 1966 – Locally, the NBC feed was carried in Baltimore by WJZ-TV, the Orioles' flagship TV station, and WBAL-TV, the Baltimore NBC affiliate; and in Los Angeles by KTTV, the Dodgers' flagship TV station, and KNBC, the Los Angeles NBC affiliate.
  - Prior to 1966, NBC typically paired the top announcers for the respective World Series teams to alternate play-by-play during each game's telecast. For example, if the Yankees played the Dodgers in the World Series, Mel Allen (representing the Yankees) would call half the game and Vin Scully (representing the Dodgers) would call the rest of the game. However, in 1966, NBC wanted their regular network announcer, Curt Gowdy, to call most of the play-by-play at the expense of the top local announcers. So instead of calling half of every World Series game on television (as Vin Scully had done in 1953, 1955, 1956, 1959, 1963, and 1965), they only got to call half of all home games on TV, providing color commentary while Gowdy called play-by-play for the rest of each game. The visiting teams' announcers participated in the NBC Radio broadcasts. In broadcasts of Series-clinching (or potentially Series-clinching) games on both mediums, NBC sent the announcer for whichever team was ahead in the game to that team's clubhouse in the ninth inning in order to help cover the trophy presentation and conduct post-game interviews.
- 1967 – Locally, the NBC feed was carried in St. Louis by KSD-TV, the Cardinals' flagship TV station as well as the St. Louis NBC affiliate; and in Boston by WHDH-TV, the Red Sox' flagship TV station, and WBZ-TV, the Boston NBC affiliate.
- 1968 – Locally, the NBC feed was carried in Detroit by WJBK, the Tigers' flagship TV station, and WWJ-TV, the Detroit NBC affiliate; and in St. Louis by KSD-TV, the Cardinals' flagship TV station as well as the St. Louis NBC affiliate.
- 1969 – Locally, the NBC feed was carried in New York by WOR-TV, the Mets' flagship TV station, and WNBC-TV, the New York City NBC affiliate; and in Baltimore by WJZ-TV, the Orioles' flagship TV station, and WBAL-TV, the Baltimore NBC affiliate.
  - Games 3–5 of the 1969 World Series are believed to be the oldest surviving color television broadcasts of World Series games (even though World Series telecasts have aired in color since 1955). However, they were "truck feeds" in that they do not contain original commercials, but showed a static image of the Shea Stadium field between innings. Games 1 and 2 were only saved as black and white kinescopes provided by the Canadian Broadcasting Corporation, which also preserved all seven games of the 1965 and 1968 World Series (plus the 1965 All-Star Game and 1968 All-Star Game) in black and white kinescope.

=== 1950s ===
Year	Network	Play-by-play
1959	NBC	Jack Brickhouse and Vin Scully
1958	NBC	Curt Gowdy and Mel Allen
1957	NBC	Mel Allen and Al Helfer
1956	NBC	Vin Scully and Mel Allen
1955	NBC	Mel Allen and Vin Scully
1954	NBC	Russ Hodges and Jack Brickhouse
1953	NBC	Mel Allen and Vin Scully
1952	NBC	Red Barber and Mel Allen
1951	NBC	Jim Britt and Russ Hodges
1950	NBC	Jim Britt and Jack Brickhouse
1950	CBS	Jim Britt and Jack Brickhouse
1950	ABC	Jim Britt and Jack Brickhouse

==== Notes ====
- By 1950, World Series games could be seen in most of the country, but not all. Also in 1950, the Mutual Broadcasting System acquired the exclusive television broadcast rights to the World Series and All-Star Game for the next six years. Mutual, which had no television network at the time (and indeed never developed one), may have been reindulging in TV network dreams or simply taking advantage of a long-standing business relationship; in any case, the network sold its TV rights to NBC in time for the following season's games at an enormous profit.
- 1951 marked the first time that the World Series was televised exclusively by one network (NBC), as well as the first time that it was televised from coast to coast.
- 1953 – Brooklyn Dodgers announcer Red Barber wanted a higher fee than was offered by Gillette, which sponsored the World Series telecasts on NBC. When Dodgers owner Walter O'Malley refused to back him, Barber declined Gillette's fee, and his then-assistant Vin Scully (who at 25 years of age became the youngest announcer to call the play-by-play of a World Series, a distinction which still stands) was partnered with the New York Yankees' Mel Allen during the series instead. In his 1968 autobiography Rhubarb in the Catbird Seat, Barber claims O'Malley's lack of support as his reason for subsequently resigning from the Dodgers' booth and joining the Yankees prior to the 1954 season.
- 1955 marked the first time that the World Series was televised in color.
- For the 1957 and 1958 Series, both of which featured the New York Yankees and Milwaukee Braves, the games played in New York were televised in color while the games in Milwaukee were shown in black and white, due to the distance between the cities being too great for NBC's color equipment to be moved in time between games.
- 1959 – Locally, the NBC feed was carried in Los Angeles by KTTV, the Dodgers' flagship TV station, and KRCA, the Los Angeles NBC station; and in Chicago by WGN-TV, the White Sox' flagship TV station, and WNBQ, the Chicago NBC station.
  - Chicago White Sox announcer Bob Elson missed a chance to call the series – the team's first since 1919 and Elson's first since 1943 – to a national audience because then-head of NBC Sports Tom Gallery (who'd incidentally grown up on the same block as Elson) didn't like him. Elson was permitted to call a re-creation of the series over White Sox radio flagship WCFL.

=== 1940s ===
Year	Network	Play-by-play
1949	NBC	Jim Britt
1949	CBS	Jim Britt
1949	DuMont	Jim Britt
1949	ABC	Jim Britt
1948	NBC	Red Barber; Tom Hussey (in Boston); Van Patrick (in Cleveland)
1948	CBS	Red Barber; Tom Hussey (in Boston); Van Patrick (in Cleveland)
1948	DuMont	Red Barber; Tom Hussey (in Boston); Van Patrick (in Cleveland)
1948	ABC	Red Barber; Tom Hussey (in Boston); Van Patrick (in Cleveland)
1947	NBC (Games 1, 5)	Bob Stanton
1947	CBS (Games 3–4)	Bob Edge
1947	DuMont (Games 2, 6–7)	Bill Slater

==== Notes ====
- The 1947 World Series was only seen in four markets via coaxial inter-connected stations: New York City; Philadelphia; Schenectady/Albany, New York; Washington, D.C.; and, environs surrounding these cities. Outside of New York, coverage was pooled.
  - The October 1947 Billboard reported over 3.9 million viewing the games, primarily on TV sets located in bars (5,400 tavern TV sets in NYC alone). The October 13, 1947 edition of Time magazine reported that President Truman, who had just made the first Oval Office TV appearance on October 5, 1947, and received the first TV for the White House, watched parts of the Series but "skipped the last innings".
- Note on 1948: Games in Boston were only seen in the Northeast. Meanwhile, games in Cleveland were only seen in the Midwest and Pittsburgh. The games were open to all channels with a network affiliation. In all, the 1948 World Series was televised to fans in seven Midwestern cities: Cleveland, Chicago, Detroit, Milwaukee, St. Louis, and Toledo.
  - Tom Hussey helped Red Barber call Games 1–2 and 6 in Boston, while Van Patrick assisted Barber in calling Games 3–5 in Cleveland.
- By 1949, World Series games could now be seen east of the Mississippi River. The games were open to all channels with a network affiliation.

=== Surviving telecasts ===
All telecasts of World Series games starting with 1975 (Reds–Red Sox) are accounted for and exist. This is a full record of World Series telecasts prior to 1975 that are known to exist in whole or part:

- 1952 (Yankees–Dodgers) – The complete telecasts of Games 6 and 7 exist, preserved on kinescope by sponsor Gillette.
- 1955 (Yankees–Dodgers) – Sections of Game 5 exist and have been released on DVD.
- 1956 (Yankees–Dodgers) – The last three innings of Game 2 are known to exist. Game 3 is complete with original commercials, and pre and post-game shows except for innings 2 and 3, and is available on DVD. Game 5, Don Larsen's perfect game, is complete except for the first inning. Game 5 was aired on the first night of the MLB Network on January 1, 2009, and is now available on DVD. Game 7 is complete except for the 2nd and 3rd innings and has also been released on DVD.
- 1957 (Yankees–Braves) – Games 1, 2 and 5 exist in their entirety and have been released on DVD. All of Game 3 (except for a snip of Tony Kubek's second home run in the top 7th inning) exists, as does the first six innings of Game 6 (both also released on DVD). Game 7 is believed to exist but has not been released.
- 1960 (Yankees–Pirates) – A complete kinescope of Game 7 was discovered in the former home of Bing Crosby in December 2009. The game was rebroadcast by MLB Network in December 2010 and is now available on DVD.
- 1961 (Yankees–Reds) – Only half-hour segments of Game 3 (the final two innings), Game 4 (the 4th and 5th inning) and Game 5 (the opening and top of the 1st inning) are known to exist.
- 1963 (Yankees–Dodgers) – Only a brief section of Game 3 is known to exist. An excerpt appears in the Yankeeography series (out on DVD).
- 1965 (Twins–Dodgers) – All seven games exist, preserved on kinescope by the CBC. It is the earliest World Series whose telecasts are known to survive in their entirety, for all seven games.
- 1968 (Tigers–Cardinals). All seven games exist, preserved on kinescope by the CBC.
- 1969 (Orioles–Mets). Games 1 and 2 have been preserved on kinescope by the CBC; Games 3–5 exist in their original color videotape quality from "truck feeds", including pregames with Jim Simpson, Sandy Koufax and Mickey Mantle.
- 1970 (Orioles–Reds). Games 1–4 have been preserved on kinescope by the CBC; Game 5 exists in its original color videotape quality from the "truck feed."
- 1971 (Orioles–Pirates). Games 1, 2, 6, and 7 exist in their complete forms. Games 3, 4, and 5 survive in partial form. These include pregame shows for six of the seven games, featuring Joe Garagiola and Sandy Koufax.
- 1972 (A's–Reds) – Game 4 is the only complete game extant, along with most of Game 5, and some of Game 2. Only fragments remain from Games 1, 3, and 6; The complete pregame show and condensed action of the first three innings of Game 7 exist from a home recording.
- 1973 (A's–Mets) – Game 1 is the only complete game extant. Game 2 (which lasted four-plus hours) is missing various bits, including the last inning and a half (including both crucial Mike Andrews misplays at second base). Game 3 is complete except for the last inning. Game 4 exists from just the pregame show to the top of the 4th inning. All that remains of Game 5 are the final two innings. Game 6 is entirely missing, and Game 7 cuts off with one out in the top of the 9th inning, missing the postgame celebrations. A 20-minute presentation tape of Series highlights, narrated by Curt Gowdy, was submitted to the Peabody Awards. The Peabody tape includes the two key Mike Andrews plays from Game 2, otherwise missing from the network archives.
- 1974 (A's–Dodgers) – Games 1–4 are complete, and Game 5 exists in partial form.

== National radio ==
=== 2020s ===
Year	Network	Play-by-play	Color commentator(s)	Field reporter(s)	Pregame hosts	Pregame analysts
2026	ESPN	Jon Sciambi	Jessica Mendoza and Eduardo Pérez	Buster Olney	Jim Basquil	Doug Glanville and Buster Olney
2025	ESPN (US)	Jon Sciambi	Jessica Mendoza and Eduardo Pérez	Buster Olney	Jim Basquil	Doug Glanville and Buster Olney
2025	CJCL/Sportsnet (Canada)	Ben Shulman	Chris Leroux	Buster Olney	Jim Basquil	Doug Glanville and Buster Olney
2024	ESPN	Jon Sciambi	Jessica Mendoza and Eduardo Pérez	Buster Olney	Kevin Winter	Doug Glanville and Buster Olney
2023	ESPN	Jon Sciambi	Jessica Mendoza and Eduardo Pérez	Buster Olney	Kevin Winter	Doug Glanville and Buster Olney
2022	ESPN	Dan Shulman	Jessica Mendoza and Eduardo Pérez	Buster Olney	Kevin Winter	Doug Glanville, Buster Olney, and Marly Rivera
2021	ESPN	Dan Shulman	Jessica Mendoza and Eduardo Pérez	Buster Olney	Kevin Winter	Chris Singleton, Buster Olney, and Marly Rivera
2020	ESPN	Dan Shulman	Chris Singleton and Jessica Mendoza	Buster Olney	Marc Kestecher	

==== Notes ====
- In 2021, TUDN Radio acquired the Spanish-language rights to Major League Baseball games, starting with that year's postseason.

=== 2010s ===
Year	Network	Play-by-play	Color commentator(s)	Field reporter(s)	Pregame hosts	Pregame analysts
2019	ESPN	Dan Shulman	Chris Singleton	Buster Olney	Kevin Winter (Games 1–2); Marc Kestecher (Games 3–7)	Buster Olney and Tim Kurkjian
2018	ESPN	Dan Shulman (Games 1–4); Jon Sciambi (Game 5)	Chris Singleton	Buster Olney	Marc Kestecher	Buster Olney and Tim Kurkjian
2017	ESPN	Dan Shulman	Aaron Boone	—N/a	Marc Kestecher	Chris Singleton, Buster Olney, and Tim Kurkjian
2016	ESPN	Dan Shulman	Aaron Boone	—N/a	Marc Kestecher	Chris Singleton
2015	ESPN	Dan Shulman	Aaron Boone	—N/a	Marc Kestecher	Chris Singleton and Peter Pascarelli
2014	ESPN	Dan Shulman	Aaron Boone	—N/a	Marc Kestecher	Chris Singleton and Peter Pascarelli
2013	ESPN	Dan Shulman	Orel Hershiser	—N/a	Marc Kestecher	Chris Singleton and Peter Pascarelli
2012	ESPN	Dan Shulman	Orel Hershiser	—N/a	Marc Kestecher	Chris Singleton and Peter Pascarelli
2011	ESPN	Dan Shulman	Orel Hershiser and Bobby Valentine	—N/a	Marc Kestecher	Chris Singleton and Peter Pascarelli
2010	ESPN	Jon Miller	Joe Morgan	—N/a	Marc Kestecher	Jon Sciambi, Dave Campbell, and Peter Pascarelli

==== Notes ====
- ESPN Radio broadcast the 2010 World Series nationally, with Jon Miller (who worked the San Francisco Giants' local radio broadcasts during the regular season) calling his 13th consecutive World Series as the network's play-by-play announcer, and Joe Morgan providing commentary on his 11th World Series for ESPN Radio and his 14th overall (counting three Series telecasts for NBC). The games were the last that Miller and Morgan (who had also been calling Sunday Night Baseball for ESPN television since 1990) would work together, as the network subsequently announced that their contracts would not be renewed for 2011. ESPN Deportes Radio also aired the Series to Spanish language listeners, with Eduardo Ortega and former Giants pitcher Juan Marichal announcing.
  - In the UK, the Series was broadcast by BBC Radio 5 Sports Extra, with Jonny Gould and Josh Chetwynd commentating.
  - Locally, the two teams' flagship stations broadcast the series with their respective announcing crews, with an additional requirement of acknowledging AutoZone, ESPN Radio's baseball broadcasting sponsor. The Giants' English-language broadcasts aired on KNBR (with Dave Flemming, Duane Kuiper, and Mike Krukow announcing) with their Spanish-language broadcasts on KIQI-AM (with Erwin Higueros and Tito Fuentes), while KRLD-FM and AM carried the Rangers' English-language broadcasts (with Eric Nadel and Dave Barnett) and KFLC-AM had their Spanish-language broadcasts (with Eleno Ornelas and Jerry Romo). Due to contractual obligations, the non-flagship stations on the teams' radio networks carried the ESPN Radio broadcasts of the games, although the local broadcasts were also available on XM Satellite Radio and to Gameday Audio subscribers at MLB.com.
- ESPN Radio broadcast the 2011 World Series nationally. This was the first World Series for play-by-play announcer Dan Shulman and analysts Orel Hershiser and Bobby Valentine. ESPN Deportes Radio aired the Series for Spanish language listeners, with Ernesto Jerez and Guillermo Celis announcing.
  - Locally, the two teams' flagship stations broadcast the Series with their respective announcing crews. The Rangers' broadcasts aired on KESN (with Eric Nadel and Steve Busby announcing), while the Cardinals' broadcasts aired on KMOX (with Mike Shannon and John Rooney announcing). Due to contractual obligations, the non-flagship stations on the teams' radio networks carried the ESPN Radio broadcasts of the games, although the local broadcasts were available on XM Satellite Radio and to Gameday Audio subscribers at MLB.com. In the United Kingdom, Simon Brotherton and Josh Chetwynd called the games for BBC Radio 5 Sports Extra.
- ESPN Radio broadcast the 2012 World Series nationally, with Dan Shulman and Orel Hershiser working their second consecutive World Series together. ESPN Deportes Radio aired the Series for Spanish language listeners, with Ernesto Jerez and Guillermo Celis announcing.
  - Locally, the two teams' flagship stations broadcast the series with their respective announcing crews. The Giants' English-language broadcasts aired on KNBR (with Dave Flemming, Jon Miller, Mike Krukow, and Duane Kuiper announcing) with their Spanish-language broadcasts on KIQI-AM (with Erwin Higueros and Tito Fuentes), while WXYT-FM and AM carried the Tigers' English-language broadcasts (with Dan Dickerson and Jim Price). Due to contractual obligations, the non-flagship stations on the teams' radio networks carried the ESPN Radio broadcasts of the games, although the local broadcasts were also available on XM Satellite Radio and to Gameday Audio subscribers at MLB.com.
- ESPN Radio broadcast the 2013 World Series in the U.S., with commentators Dan Shulman and Orel Hershiser.
  - Locally, the two teams' flagship radio stations broadcast the series with their respective announcing crews. Mike Shannon and John Rooney called the games for the Cardinals on KMOX in St. Louis, while Joe Castiglione, Dave O'Brien, and Lou Merloni announced for the Red Sox on WEEI in Boston.
- ESPN Radio aired the 2014 World Series, with Dan Shulman on play-by-play and Aaron Boone handling color commentary. Marc Kestecher anchored pre- and post-game coverage for the network along with Jon Sciambi, Chris Singleton and Peter Pascarelli. ESPN Deportes Radio offered a Spanish-language broadcast, with Eduardo Ortega announcing along with Renato Bermúdez, Armando Talavera and José Francisco Rivera.
  - Locally, the series was broadcast on the teams' flagship radio stations with their respective announcing crews. In San Francisco, KNBR aired the games in English (with Jon Miller, Duane Kuiper, Mike Krukow and Dave Flemming announcing), while KTRB broadcast in Spanish (with Erwin Higueros and Tito Fuentes announcing). In Kansas City, KCSP broadcast the games (with Denny Matthews and Ryan Lefebvre announcing). Due to contractual obligations, the affiliate stations on the teams' radio networks had to carry the ESPN Radio feed of the games, although the local broadcasts were also available on Sirius and XM satellite radio and to Gameday Audio subscribers at MLB.com. In Kansas City, WHB carried the ESPN Radio feed in direct competition with KCSP's broadcast. This was the first World Series for which Jon Miller, who had been the Giants' primary radio announcer since 1997, called the final (see Note below), championship-clinching out to a local San Francisco audience.
- ESPN Radio aired the 2015 World Series, with Dan Shulman on play-by-play, Aaron Boone handling color commentary, and Buster Olney serving as field reporter. Tampa Bay Rays pitcher Chris Archer served as a guest commentator for selected innings in Games 1, 2 and 5. Marc Kestecher anchored pre-game and post-game coverage for the network along with Chris Singleton and Peter Pascarelli.
  - Locally, the series was broadcast on the teams' flagship radio stations with their respective announcing crews. In New York, WOR aired the games in English, with Howie Rose and Josh Lewin announcing, while WEPN-AM aired the games in Spanish, with Juan Alicea and Max Pérez Jiménez announcing. In Kansas City, KCSP broadcast the games, with Denny Matthews, Ryan Lefebvre, Steve Stewart, and Steve Physioc announcing. WEPN-FM and WHB, the ESPN Radio affiliates in New York and Kansas City respectively, aired the network's coverage of the series in those cities.
- ESPN Radio's national network covered the 2016 World Series through affiliated stations, with Dan Shulman providing the play-by-play and Aaron Boone serving as color commentator. Tampa Bay Rays pitcher Chris Archer appeared as a guest analyst for select innings of Games 1 and 2.
  - Locally, the teams' flagship stations broadcast the series with their regular announcers. In Cleveland, WTAM (1100) and WMMS (100.7) carried the Indians' play-by-play with Tom Hamilton and Jim Rosenhaus, while in Chicago, WSCR (670) carried the Cubs' play-by-play with Pat Hughes, Ron Coomer, and Len Kasper. The affiliate stations of the teams' regional radio networks, however, were contractually obligated to carry the national ESPN Radio feed.
- ESPN Radio broadcast the 2017 World Series nationally in English, with Dan Shulman providing the play-by-play and Aaron Boone serving as color commentator. Marc Kestecher hosted the pre-game and post-game coverage along with analyst Chris Singleton and reporters Buster Olney and Tim Kurkjian. The ESPN Radio coverage was carried on affiliated stations throughout the United States and Canada, as well as online at ESPN.com and via the ESPN mobile app. Spanish-language coverage was provided by ESPN Deportes Radio, with Eduardo Ortega, Renato Bermúdez, José Francisco Rivera, and Orlando Hernández announcing.
  - Locally, both teams' flagship radio stations broadcast the series with their regular announcers. Sportstalk 790 aired the English-language broadcast for the Houston area, with Robert Ford and Steve Sparks calling the games. In Los Angeles, AM 570 LA Sports aired the English-language broadcast, with Charley Steiner and Rick Monday announcing. In Spanish, Univision America 1020 carried the broadcast, with Jaime Jarrín and Jorge Jarrín on the call. In Korean, Radio Korea 1540 aired the series, with Richard Choi and Chong Ho Yim in the booth.
- 2018 – ESPN Radio broadcast the World Series in English for the 21st straight year. Dan Shulman called the play-by-play, with Chris Singleton serving as color commentator and Buster Olney as field reporter. Marc Kestecher hosted the pre-game and post-game coverage with Olney and Tim Kurkjian reporting. Jon Sciambi called the play-by-play for Game 5 due to Shulman developing laryngitis. ESPN Deportes Radio provided Spanish-language coverage of the Series. Eduardo Ortega called the play-by-play and Orlando Hernández, Renato Bermudez, and José Francisco Rivera served as analysts.
  - Locally, both teams' flagship radio stations broadcast the series with their regular announcers, which were simulcast over SiriusXM radio. In Los Angeles, the broadcast was on AM 570 LA Sports with Charley Steiner and Rick Monday in English, on Univision America 1020 with Jaime Jarrín and Jorge Jarrín in Spanish, and on Radio Korea 1540 AM in Korean. The Red Sox broadcast was on WEEI 93.7 FM in English with Joe Castiglione, Tim Neverett and Lou Merloni, and in Spanish on WCCM 1490 AM with Uri Berenguer.
- 2019 – ESPN Radio broadcast the World Series for the 22nd straight year, with coverage presented by AutoZone. Dan Shulman served as play-by-play announcer, with Chris Singleton as color commentator and Buster Olney as field reporter. Marc Kestecher and Kevin Winter hosted the pregame shows with reporter Tim Kurkjian. New Spanish-language radio network Unanimo Deportes, flagshipped at WMYM Miami, broadcast its first World Series with Beto Ferreiro and Orlando Hernández announcing.
  - Locally, both teams' flagship radio stations broadcast the series with their regular announcers. In Houston, KBME aired the series with Robert Ford and Steve Sparks announcing. In Washington, WJFK-FM aired the series with Charlie Slowes and Dave Jageler calling the games. Per MLB rules, the teams' other radio affiliates were permitted to carry the series but were required to air the ESPN Radio broadcast.

=== 2000s ===
Year	Network	Play-by-play	Color commentator(s)	Pregame hosts	Pregame analysts
2009	ESPN	Jon Miller	Joe Morgan	Jon Sciambi	Dave Campbell and Peter Pascarelli
2008	ESPN	Jon Miller	Joe Morgan	Jon Sciambi	Dave Campbell and Peter Pascarelli
2007	ESPN	Jon Miller	Joe Morgan	Jon Sciambi	Dave Campbell and Peter Pascarelli
2006	ESPN	Jon Miller	Joe Morgan	Dan Shulman	Dave Campbell and Peter Pascarelli
2005	ESPN	Jon Miller	Joe Morgan	Dan Shulman	Dave Campbell
2004	ESPN	Jon Miller	Joe Morgan	Dan Shulman	Dave Campbell
2003	ESPN	Jon Miller	Joe Morgan	Dan Shulman	Dave Campbell
2002	ESPN	Jon Miller	Joe Morgan	Dan Shulman	Dave Campbell
2001	ESPN	Jon Miller	Joe Morgan	Charley Steiner	Dave Campbell
2000	ESPN	Jon Miller; Charley Steiner (Game 3)	Dave Campbell	Charley Steiner	Dave Campbell

==== Notes ====
- During Game 3 of the 2000 World Series, ESPN Radio announcer Jon Miller was forced to leave the booth after the top of the first inning due to an upper respiratory infection. Charley Steiner, who was serving as a pre-game host and field reporter for the network, filled in on play-by-play for the rest of the game; Miller resumed his duties in Game 4 of the Series.
- 2001 – ESPN Radio provided national radio coverage for the fourth consecutive year, with Jon Miller and Joe Morgan calling the action.
  - Locally, the Series was broadcast by KTAR-AM in Phoenix with Thom Brennaman, Greg Schulte, Rod Allen and Jim Traber, and by WABC-AM in New York City with John Sterling and Michael Kay. This would be Sterling and Kay's last World Series working together, and Game 7 would be the last Yankee broadcast on WABC. Kay moved to television and the new YES Network the following season and WCBS picked up radio rights to the Yankees. It was Kay who announced Derek Jeter's game-winning home run in Game 4 of the series and subsequently anointed him as "Mr. November".
- Jon Miller, who called the 2002 World Series for ESPN Radio, has been play-by-play man for the San Francisco Giants since 1997. Coincidentally, KNBR, the Giants' longtime flagship station, was also San Francisco's ESPN Radio affiliate at the time.
  - Locally, the 2002 World Series was broadcast by KLAC-AM in Los Angeles with Rory Markas and Terry Smith, and by KNBR in San Francisco with Duane Kuiper, Joe Angel, and Mike Krukow.
- Locally, KTRH-AM and WMVP were the primary carriers for the 2005 World Series in the Houston and Chicago markets. For KTRH, long-time Astros voice Milo Hamilton provided play-by-play while John Rooney called the games for the White Sox. Game 4 was Rooney's last call after seventeen years as the radio voice of the White Sox, as he left to take the same position with the St. Louis Cardinals.
- 2006 – Locally, Dan Dickerson and Jim Price called the Series for the Tigers on WXYT-AM in Detroit (with retired, longtime Tiger announcer Ernie Harwell returning to call the second inning of Game 1), while Mike Shannon and John Rooney called it for the Cardinals on KTRS-AM in St. Louis. Per contractual obligation, the non-flagship stations on the teams' radio networks carried the ESPN Radio broadcasts. John Rooney had broadcast the 2005 Series for the Chicago White Sox, and thus became the first announcer to call back-to-back World Series championships as an employee of different teams.
- 2007 – Locally, Joe Castiglione and Glenn Geffner called the Series for the Red Sox on WRKO in Boston, while Jack Corrigan and Jeff Kingery called it for the Rockies on KOA in Denver. Per contractual obligation, the non-flagship stations on the teams' radio networks carried the ESPN Radio broadcasts.
- On radio, the 2008 World Series was broadcast nationally by ESPN Radio with Jon Miller and Joe Morgan announcing, and a Spanish broadcast on ESPN Deportes Radio.
  - Locally, Dave Wills, Andy Freed, Dewayne Staats and Joe Magrane called the Series in English for the Rays on WHNZ-AM in Tampa, with Ricardo Tavaras and Enrique Oliu working the Spanish broadcast on St. Petersburg's WGES-AM. Harry Kalas, Scott Franzke, Larry Andersen, and Chris Wheeler called the Phillies' English broadcasts on WPHT-AM in Philadelphia, with Spanish announcers Danny Martinez, Bill Kulik and Juan Ramos on WUBA. Following their contractual obligations, the non-flagship stations on the teams' radio networks carried the ESPN Radio broadcasts. MLB.com also carried the local radio broadcasts for online streaming, while XM Satellite Radio aired the local and national feeds to its subscribers. For Harry Kalas, this series brought together a father and son calling the series for different teams, with his son, Todd, calling the Series in English for the Rays. This World Series win had significance for Fox's Tim McCarver and Harry Kalas. Both were Phillies broadcasters in 1980, but neither one could call the final out. McCarver was a backup commentator for Game of the Week on NBC, but he was not part of the broadcast team that called the final out. For Kalas, MLB radio-broadcasting regulations forbade local stations from producing live coverage of World Series games, instead forcing them to air the national CBS Radio feed of the games. Philadelphia fans were so outraged about this afterward that they started a letter-writing campaign to the Commissioner's Office, demanding a change to the rule. The following year, MLB amended its broadcasting contracts to allow World Series teams' flagship radio stations to air the games with local announcers, due at least in part to this outcry from Philadelphia fans. In 2008, both called the Phillies' World Series win.
- 2009 – The flagship radio stations of the respective teams broadcast all Series games with their local announcers. In Philadelphia, WPHT carried the Phillies' English-language broadcasts, with Scott Franzke, Larry Andersen, Tom McCarthy, Gary Matthews, and Chris Wheeler announcing, while WUBA aired the team's Spanish broadcasts. In New York, WCBS-AM carried the Yankees' English broadcasts with John Sterling and Suzyn Waldman announcing. This broadcast made Waldman the first woman to announce a World Series game on radio. XM Satellite Radio offered multiple feeds of each game to its subscribers.

=== 1990s ===
Year	Network	Play-by-play	Color commentator(s)	Pregame host	Pregame analyst
1999	ESPN	Jon Miller	Rick Sutcliffe	Charley Steiner	Dave Campbell
1998	ESPN	Jon Miller	Joe Morgan	Charley Steiner	Kevin Kennedy
1997	CBS	Vin Scully	Jeff Torborg	John Rooney	
1996	CBS	Vin Scully	Jeff Torborg	John Rooney	
1995	CBS	Vin Scully	Jeff Torborg	John Rooney	
1993	CBS	Vin Scully	Johnny Bench	John Rooney	
1992	CBS	Vin Scully	Johnny Bench	John Rooney	
1991	CBS	Vin Scully	Johnny Bench	John Rooney	
1990	CBS	Vin Scully	Johnny Bench	John Rooney	

==== Notes ====
- 1990 – Vin Scully returned to CBS Radio's coverage of the World Series for the first time since 1982 (Scully then called the 1984, 1986 and 1988 World Series for NBC television), calling the series alongside Johnny Bench. Scully would go on to call the next six series for CBS, first with Bench and later with Jeff Torborg.
- 1992 – Locally, the Series was called on WGST-AM in Atlanta by Skip Caray, Pete Van Wieren, Joe Simpson, and Don Sutton, and on CJCL-AM in Toronto by Jerry Howarth and Tom Cheek.
- The national radio broadcast of the 1993 World Series was also provided by CBS, with Vin Scully and Johnny Bench on the call. Game 6 marked Johnny Bench's final broadcast for CBS Radio after nine years.
  - Locally, the Series was called on WOGL-AM in Philadelphia by Harry Kalas, Richie Ashburn, Chris Wheeler and Andy Musser, and on CJCL-AM in Toronto by Jerry Howarth and Tom Cheek. Cheek's call of the Carter home run ("Touch 'em all Joe, you'll never hit a bigger home run in your life!") lives on in Blue Jays folklore. This was Richie Ashburn's last World Series as a Phillies broadcaster, as he died in 1997. Andy Musser also called his last World Series as a member of the Phillies' broadcast team; he retired in 2001 and died eleven years later. Tom Cheek never called another postseason game in his role as voice of the Blue Jays, from which he retired in 2005 prior to his death from brain cancer. Meanwhile, Harry Kalas would not call another World Series until 2008. Kalas later died in 2009 prior to a game at Nationals Park in Washington, D.C.. Chris Wheeler continues to call games for the Phillies although in a limited capacity and Jerry Howarth has continued to call Blue Jays games, moving into the primary play-by-play position following the death of Cheek.
- The 1997 World Series is the last World Series to date to be broadcast by the CBS Radio Network, who had covered the World Series consecutively since 1976. Vin Scully and Jeff Torborg called the 1997 World Series for CBS Radio (the latter had once managed the Cleveland Indians and would later manage the Florida Marlins). ESPN Radio would take over the national radio contract for Major League Baseball. This was Scully's eleventh and final call for CBS Radio in the World Series, and seventh consecutive since he rejoined the network following NBC's 1989 loss of baseball. As of 2011, this is also the last World Series broadcast to date for Scully who, in addition to his eleven CBS Radio World Series calls has called fourteen others for NBC and the Los Angeles Dodgers.). Torborg would continue to call games for Fox television until the end of the 2000 season, working alongside John Rooney and Chip Caray, when he elected to return to managing and was hired by the Montreal Expos.
  - Game 7 was the final Major League Baseball game called by longtime Indians radio announcer Herb Score, as he retired at season's end. Score's broadcast partner, Tom Hamilton, would take over as lead announcer the following year. It also marked the final game carried by Indians flagship station WKNR; the broadcast rights would be moved to WTAM for the 1998 season.
- Rick Sutcliffe substituted for Joe Morgan on the ESPN Radio broadcast of the 1999 World Series due to Morgan's duties for NBC Sports, who had the rights to the series that year, taking priority.

=== 1980s ===
Year	Network	Play-by-play	Color commentator(s)	Pregame host
1989	CBS	Jack Buck	Johnny Bench	John Rooney
1988	CBS	Jack Buck	Bill White	John Rooney
1987	CBS	Jack Buck	Bill White	John Rooney
1986	CBS	Jack Buck	Sparky Anderson	Win Elliot
1985	CBS	Jack Buck	Sparky Anderson	Win Elliot
1984	CBS	Jack Buck	Brent Musburger (Games 1–4); Win Elliot (Game 5)	Win Elliot
1983	CBS	Jack Buck	Sparky Anderson	Win Elliot
1982	CBS	Vin Scully	Sparky Anderson	Win Elliot
1981	CBS	Vin Scully	Sparky Anderson	Win Elliot
1980	CBS	Vin Scully	Sparky Anderson	Win Elliot

==== Notes ====
- In 1984, CBS Radio used Brent Musburger as a color commentator, as Sparky Anderson was unavailable due to managing the Tigers in the series. Win Elliot took over the color duties for Game 5 while Musburger hosted The NFL Today from the studio for CBS television.
- In 1985 and 1987, KMOX, the St. Louis Cardinals' flagship station at the time, simulcast with CBS Radio's World Series coverage involving the Cardinals. That was mainly because Jack Buck had a lengthy career calling Cardinals games for KMOX (a station owned by CBS until 2018) to go along with his national work for CBS Radio.
  - In 1985 and 1986, CBS Radio designated the fifth inning of each Series game as a "Home Team Inning." A local announcer for the visiting team would appear on the network's broadcast in the top of the fifth, with the home team announcer doing so in the bottom of the fifth.
- In 1986, CBS Radio used Rick Dempsey as a reporter.
  - Locally, the series was called on WHN-AM in New York by Bob Murphy and Gary Thorne, and on WPLM-FM in Boston by Ken Coleman and Joe Castiglione.
- Jack Buck and Bill White provided commentary for the 1988 World Series for CBS Radio. It was White's last World Series as a broadcaster, as he left broadcasting to become President of the National League following the final game. This was Buck's call of Kirk Gibson's game-winning home run off of Dennis Eckersley in Game 1. It begins here with Buck speculating on what might happen if Gibson manages to reach base:

... then you would run for Gibson and have Sax batting. But, we have a big 3–2 pitch coming here from Eckersley. Gibson swings, and a fly ball to deep right field! This is gonna be a home run! Unbelievable! A home run for Gibson! And the Dodgers have won the game, five to four; I don't believe what I just saw! I don't believe what I just saw! Is this really happening, Bill? One of the most remarkable finishes to any World Series Game...a one-handed home run by Kirk Gibson! And the Dodgers have won it...five to four; and I'm stunned, Bill. I have seen a lot of dramatic finishes in a lot of sports, but this one might top almost every other one.

- On October 17, 1989, CBS Radio commentators Jack Buck, Johnny Bench and John Rooney were on hand at San Francisco's Candlestick Park for Game 3 of the World Series between the San Francisco Giants and Oakland Athletics. At 5:04 p.m. local time, the Loma Prieta earthquake hit (and subsequently caused a ten-day delay for the World Series). Unlike ABC-Television (with Al Michaels, Jim Palmer and Tim McCarver calling the action on the TV side), CBS Radio was in a commercial break when the earthquake struck. After the earthquake hit, Jack Buck told the listening audience, "I must say about Johnny Bench, folks, if he moved that fast when he played, he would have never hit into a double play. I never saw anybody move that fast in my life."
  - This was Buck's seventh and last World Series call for CBS Radio, as he moved to CBS' television coverage of baseball the following year. Bench continued to call the World Series on radio through 1993 as Vin Scully's color man.
  - Locally, the 1989 World Series was broadcast by KSFO in San Francisco with Bill King, Lon Simmons and Ray Fosse, and by KNBR in San Francisco with Hank Greenwald and Ron Fairly.

=== 1970s ===
Year	Network	Play-by-play	Color commentator(s)/Secondary play-by-play	Pregame hosts
1979	CBS	Vin Scully	Sparky Anderson	Win Elliot
1978	CBS	Bill White (in Los Angeles); Ross Porter (in New York)	Win Elliot	Jerry Coleman (in Los Angeles); Ralph Kiner (in New York)
1977	CBS	Ross Porter (in New York); Bill White (in Los Angeles)	Win Elliot	Ralph Kiner (in New York); Jerry Coleman (in Los Angeles)
1976	CBS	Bill White (in Cincinnati); Marty Brennaman (in New York)	Win Elliot	Bill Sorrell (in Cincinnati); Brent Musburger (in New York)
1975	NBC	Marty Brennaman (in Boston); Ned Martin (Games 3, 5–6); Dick Stockton (Games 4, 7)	Joe Garagiola (Games 1, 3, 5, 7); Curt Gowdy (Games 2, 4, 6)	
1974	NBC	Monte Moore (in Los Angeles); Vin Scully (in Oakland)	Jim Simpson	
1973	NBC	Ralph Kiner (in Oakland); Monte Moore (in New York)	Jim Simpson	
1972	NBC	Monte Moore (in Cincinnati); Al Michaels (in Oakland)	Jim Simpson	
1971	NBC	Bob Prince (in Baltimore); Bill O'Donnell (Games 3–7)	Jim Simpson	
1970	NBC	Chuck Thompson (in Cincinnati); Jim McIntyre (in Baltimore)	Jim Simpson	

==== Notes ====
- When CBS Radio got the contract from NBC Radio in 1976, they continued the practice of having the local announcers for the visiting teams do the play-by-play for each World Series game through 1978. Thus, Bill White got to do all three World Series involving the New York Yankees on CBS Radio from 1976 through 1978 and Ross Porter worked the Los Angeles Dodgers' appearances in 1977 and 1978. In addition, the network used Marty Brennaman in 1976, when his Cincinnati Reds played against White's Yankees.
  - Win Elliot served as a color commentator on CBS Radio's coverage from 1976 to 1978, teaming with the respective local play-by-play announcers for each game's broadcast.
- In 1977, Bill White did play-by-play for the games in Los Angeles on CBS Radio while Ross Porter handled the play-by-play for CBS in New York. Conversely, when White appeared on ABC-TV during the series, it was for the games played in New York in a pre/postgame role (White would eventually cover the trophy presentation ceremony for ABC). Likewise, Porter handled the ABC pre/postgame while in Los Angeles.
- 1979 was the first year in which a single announcer (in this instance, CBS Radio's Vin Scully) provided all of the play-by-play for a radio network's World Series broadcast. In prior years, multiple announcers split the play-by-play during each game or between games.
  - CBS Radio, following the lead begun by ABC's and NBC's television coverage in 1977 and 1978 respectively, dropped its use of local team announcers on World Series play-by-play when Vin Scully started calling the event as a CBS employee through 1982. (Beginning in 1982, however, the participating teams' flagship radio stations were permitted to produce their own World Series broadcasts using local announcers and air them live. The affiliate stations in the teams' radio networks continued to be obligated to carry the CBS Radio broadcasts.)

=== 1960s ===
Year	Network	Play-by-play	Color commentator(s)/Secondary play-by-play
1969	NBC	Ralph Kiner (in Baltimore); Bill O'Donnell (in New York)	Jim Simpson
1968	NBC	Ernie Harwell (in St. Louis); Jack Buck (in Detroit)	Pee Wee Reese; Jim Simpson (Game 7)
1967	NBC	Harry Caray (in Boston); Ken Coleman (in St. Louis)	Pee Wee Reese; Jim Simpson (Game 7)
1966	NBC	Chuck Thompson (in Los Angeles); Vin Scully (in Baltimore)	Bob Prince
1965	NBC	By Saam and Joe Garagiola	
1964	NBC	Phil Rizzuto and Joe Garagiola (in St. Louis); Harry Caray and Curt Gowdy (in New York)	
1963	NBC	Ernie Harwell and Joe Garagiola	
1962	NBC	George Kell and Joe Garagiola	
1961	NBC	Bob Wolff and Waite Hoyt	
1960	NBC	Chuck Thompson and Jack Quinlan	

==== Notes ====
- Beginning in 1966 and continuing through 1975, a local announcer for the visiting team in each Series game would split play-by-play and color commentary with a neutral NBC Radio announcer. Prior to 1966 and going back to the dawn of the television era, Series radio broadcasts typically featured announcers from around the major leagues (generally pairing one announcer from an AL team and another from an NL team), with the regular announcers for both the home and visiting Series participants splitting play-by-play on NBC television. In broadcasts of Series-clinching (or potentially Series-clinching) games on both mediums, NBC sent the announcer for whichever team was ahead in the game to that team's clubhouse in the ninth inning in order to help cover the trophy presentation and conduct post-game interviews.

=== 1950s ===
Year	Network	Play-by-play	Pregame hosts
1959	NBC	Mel Allen and By Saam	
1958	NBC	Bob Wolff and Earl Gillespie	Buddy Blattner
1957	NBC	Bob Wolff and Earl Gillespie	Bill Corum
1956	Mutual	Bob Wolff and Bob Neal	Bill Corum
1955	Mutual	Al Helfer and Bob Neal	Frankie Frisch
1954	Mutual	Al Helfer and Jimmy Dudley	Frankie Frisch
1953	Mutual	Al Helfer and Gene Kelly	Bill Corum
1952	Mutual	Al Helfer and Jack Brickhouse	Bill Corum
1951	Mutual	Mel Allen and Al Helfer	
1950	Mutual	Mel Allen and Gene Kelly	Al Helfer

==== Notes ====
- NBC Radio succeeded Mutual as the exclusive World Series radio network beginning in 1957.

=== 1940s ===
Year	Network	Play-by-play	Pregame hosts
1949	Mutual	Mel Allen and Red Barber	
1948	Mutual	Mel Allen and Jim Britt	
1947	Mutual	Mel Allen and Red Barber	
1946	Mutual	Jim Britt and Arch McDonald	Bill Corum
1945	Mutual	Bill Slater and Al Helfer	Bill Corum
1944	Mutual	Don Dunphy and Bill Slater	Bill Corum
1943	Mutual	Red Barber and Bob Elson	Bill Corum
1942	Mutual	Red Barber and Mel Allen	Bill Corum
1941	Mutual	Red Barber and Bob Elson	Bill Corum
1940	Mutual	Red Barber and Bob Elson	Mel Allen

=== 1930s ===
Year	Network	Play-by-play	Color commentator(s)
1939	Mutual	Red Barber and Bob Elson	Grantland Rice, Lowell Thomas, Edwin C. Hill, Gabriel Heatter, and Stan Lomax
1938	NBC Red	Red Barber and Tom Manning	George Hicks
1938	NBC Blue	Johnny O'Hara and George Higgins	Rosey Rowswell
1938	CBS	John Harrington, Pat Flanagan, and France Laux	Bill Dyer and Mel Allen
1938	Mutual	Bob Elson and Quin Ryan	David Driscoll and Stan Lomax
1937	NBC	Tom Manning and Red Barber	Warren Brown and George Hicks
1937	CBS	France Laux and Bill Dyer	Paul Douglas
1937	Mutual	Bob Elson and Johnny O'Hara	David Driscoll
1936	NBC	Tom Manning, Ty Tyson, and Red Barber	Warren Brown
1936	CBS	France Laux and Bill Dyer	Boake Carter
1936	Mutual	Bob Elson and Tony Wakeman	Gabriel Heatter
1935	NBC	Hal Totten and Ty Tyson	Boake Carter
1935	CBS	France Laux and Jack Graney	Truman Bradley
1935	Mutual	Bob Elson and Red Barber	Quin Ryan
1934	NBC	Tom Manning and Ford Bond	Graham McNamee and Don Wilson
1934	CBS	France Laux and Pat Flanagan	Ted Husing
1933	NBC	Hal Totten and Tom Manning	Graham McNamee
1933	CBS	Fred Hoey, France Laux, and Roger Baker	Ted Husing
1932	NBC	Hal Totten and Tom Manning	Graham McNamee
1932	CBS	Bob Elson and Pat Flanagan	Ted Husing
1931	NBC	Graham McNamee and Tom Manning	George Hicks
1931	CBS	Ted Husing	
1930	NBC	Graham McNamee	Ford Frick
1930	CBS	Ted Husing	

==== Notes ====
- Fred Hoey was hired by CBS to call Games 1 and 5 of the 1933 World Series after commissioner Kenesaw Mountain Landis declared that CBS' Ted Husing and NBC's Graham McNamee could not call World Series play-by-play because they hadn't called any regular season games. Hoey was removed from the CBS broadcast during the fourth inning of Game 1 after his voice gave out on the air. Although he was subsequently reported as having suffered from a cold, Hoey's garbled and incoherent speech led many listeners to think he was drunk. After this incident, Hoey never went into a broadcast booth without a tin of throat lozenges.
- The 1934 World Series broadcasts were the first to be sponsored, with Ford giving US$50,000 each to CBS and NBC. Commissioner Landis barred Detroit Tigers announcer Ty Tyson from appearing on network radio, citing the risk of partiality in his commentary; however, after Tigers fans sent in more than 600,000 letters of protest, Landis agreed to let Tyson call the Series locally on Detroit station WWJ.
- In 1939, Mutual and Gillette signed an agreement purchasing exclusive broadcast and sponsorship rights to the World Series for US$100,000. A special promotion of Gillette razors and blue blades sold four times better than preliminary estimates, leading the company to secure additional sports sponsorships. The Gillette stable of sports broadcasts, which aired under the umbrella title Gillette Cavalcade of Sports, spanned several different networks (including NBC, CBS, and Mutual radio) and grew to include not only ongoing sponsorship of baseball's World Series and All-Star Game but also the annual Kentucky Derby in horseracing, the Rose Bowl Game and other college football games, and professional boxing. Mutual continued as the exclusive World Series radio network until 1957, while Gillette's exclusive sponsorship of the event extended into the early television era and continued until the late 1950s.

=== 1920s ===
Year	Network	Play-by-play	Color commentator(s)
1929	NBC	Graham McNamee	
1929	CBS	Ted Husing	
1928	NBC	Graham McNamee	Phillips Carlin
1928	CBS	J. Andrew White	Ted Husing
1927	NBC	Graham McNamee	Phillips Carlin
1927	CBS	J. Andrew White	
1926	Westinghouse	Graham McNamee	Phillips Carlin
1925	Westinghouse	Graham McNamee	Quin Ryan
1924	Westinghouse	Graham McNamee	
1923	Westinghouse	W. O. McGeehan (Games 1–3); Graham McNamee (Games 3–6)	
1922	Westinghouse	Grantland Rice	W. O. McGeehan
1921	KDKA	Grantland Rice and Tommy Cowan	
1921	WBZ	Grantland Rice and Tommy Cowan	
1921	WJZ	Grantland Rice and Tommy Cowan	

==== Notes ====
- Before radio, reporters would telegraph World Series info to centers where game boards were set up to display to thousands.
- The 1921 World Series was broadcast over radio stations KDKA in Pittsburgh, Pennsylvania, WBZ in Springfield, Massachusetts, and WJZ in Newark, New Jersey. KDKA's coverage, featuring play-by-play commentary from Grantland Rice, was live, direct, and exclusive from the Polo Grounds. Meanwhile, WBZ and WJZ coverage was relayed and re-created by Tommy Cowan. Sandy Hunt, a sportswriter for the Newark Sunday Call, sent play-by-play reports/summaries to Cowan via the telephone.
- Note on 1922 through 1926: World Series coverage carried by Westinghouse Broadcasting was available to any commercially operated radio station.
- The 1923 World Series featured the first true, stadium-originated radio broadcast of World Series games. Bill McGeehan did the play-by-play honors at first. However, when McGeehan reportedly tired of the chore, he quit in the middle of Game 3. Shortly thereafter, Graham McNamee took over play-by-play duties.
  - AT&T fed the 1923 World Series coverage by New York's WEAF via their long-distance lines to stations as far north as Massachusetts and as far south as Washington, D.C.
- The 1927 World Series was the first to be broadcast from coast to coast over a full radio network.
- The 1929 World Series was the first to be broadcast in Canada.

== Local radio ==
Since 1982, the participating teams' flagship radio stations are permitted to air their own World Series broadcasts with their regular announcing crews, and their audio is made available as usual through MLB's digital presences and SiriusXM. However, the teams' other radio network affiliates are contractually obligated to carry the national radio feeds. The flagship stations also mention the coverage as being presented by the same sponsor as the ESPN Radio broadcasts.

=== 2020s ===
Year	Teams	Flagship stations	Play-by-play #1	Play-by-play #2	Play-by-play #3	Color commentators
2026	Milwaukee–Tampa Bay	WTMJ (Milwaukee); WDAE (Tampa Bay)	Jeff Levering; Andy Freed and Neil Solondz	Lane Grindle; Neil Solondz and Andy Freed (innings 3–4, 7–8; Freed and Wills alternated between primary and secondary play-by-play each game)	Josh Maurer	
2025	L.A. Dodgers–Toronto	KLAC (L.A. Dodgers); CJCL (Toronto)	Stephen Nelson; Ben Shulman			Rick Monday; Chris Leroux
2024	L.A. Dodgers–N.Y. Yankees	KLAC (L.A. Dodgers); WFAN (N.Y. Yankees)	Stephen Nelson; John Sterling			Rick Monday; Suzyn Waldman
2023	Texas–Arizona	KRLD (Dallas-Fort Worth); KMVP (Arizona)	Eric Nadel; Greg Schulte	Matt Hicks (innings 3–4, 7); Chris Garagiola (innings 4–6)		Tom Candiotti
2022	Houston–Philadelphia	KBME (Houston); WIP (Philadelphia)	Robert Ford; Scott Franzke	Tom McCarthy (innings 5–6)		Steve Sparks; Larry Andersen
2021	Atlanta–Houston	WCNN (Atlanta); KBME (Houston)	Ben Ingram; Robert Ford			Joe Simpson; Steve Sparks
2020	L.A. Dodgers–Tampa Bay	KLAC (L.A. Dodgers); WDAE (Tampa Bay)	Charley Steiner; Andy Freed and Dave Wills	Dave Wills and Andy Freed (innings 3–4, 7–8; Freed and Wills alternated between primary and secondary play-by-play each game)		Rick Monday

=== 2010s ===
Year	Teams	Flagship stations	Play-by-play #1	Play-by-play #2	Play-by-play #3	Color commentators
2019	Washington–Houston	WJFK-FM (Washington); KBME (Houston)	Charlie Slowes; Robert Ford	Dave Jageler (innings 3–4, 6–7)		Steve Sparks
2018	Boston–L.A. Dodgers	WEEI/WEEI-FM (Boston); KLAC (L.A. Dodgers)	Joe Castiglione; Charley Steiner	Tim Neverett (innings 3–4, 6–7)		Lou Merloni; Rick Monday
2017	Houston–L.A. Dodgers	KBME (Houston); KLAC (L.A. Dodgers)	Robert Ford; Charley Steiner			Steve Sparks; Rick Monday
2016	Chicago–Cleveland	WSCR (Chicago); WTAM/WMMS (Cleveland)	Pat Hughes; Tom Hamilton	Len Kasper (inning 5); Jim Rosenhaus (innings 4–5)		Ron Coomer
2015	Kansas City–N.Y. Mets	KCSP (Kansas City); WOR (New York)	Denny Matthews; Howie Rose	Ryan Lefebvre (innings 3–4, 6–7, and even extra innings [Game 1 went 14 innings and Game 5 went 12 innings]); Josh Lewin (innings 3–4, 7, and even extra innings [Game 1 went 14 innings and Game 5 went 12 innings])		
2014	San Francisco–Kansas City	KNBR (San Francisco); KCSP (Kansas City)	Jon Miller; Denny Matthews	Dave Flemming (innings 3, 6); Ryan Lefebvre (innings 3–4, 6–7)	Duane Kuiper (innings 4,7)	Mike Krukow
2013	Boston–St. Louis	WEEI (Boston); KMOX (St. Louis)	Dave O'Brien; Mike Shannon	Joe Castiglione (innings 3–4, 6–7); John Rooney (innings 3–4, 7–8)		Lou Merloni
2012	San Francisco–Detroit	KNBR (San Francisco); WXYT (Detroit)	Jon Miller; Dan Dickerson	Dave Flemming (innings 3, 6, 10 (Game 4))	Duane Kuiper (innings 4, 7)	Mike Krukow; Jim Price
2011	St. Louis–Texas	KMOX (St. Louis); KESN (Dallas-Fort Worth)	Mike Shannon; Eric Nadel	John Rooney (innings 3–4, 7–8, and even innings for extra inning games (Game 6); Steve Busby (innings 3–4, 7, and even extra innings (Game 6)		
2010	San Francisco–Texas	KNBR (San Francisco); KRLD (Dallas-Fort Worth)	Duane Kuiper; Eric Nadel	Dave Flemming (innings 3–4, 7); Dave Barnett (innings 3–4, 7)		Mike Krukow

=== 2000s ===
Year	Teams	Flagship stations	Play-by-play #1	Play-by-play #2	Play-by-play #3	Color commentators
2009	N.Y. Yankees–Philadelphia	WCBS (N.Y. Yankees); WPHT (Philadelphia)	John Sterling; Scott Franzke	Chris Wheeler (innings 4–6)		Suzyn Waldman; Larry Andersen
2008	Philadelphia–Tampa Bay	WPHT (Philadelphia); WHNZ (Tampa Bay)	Harry Kalas; Andy Freed and Dave Wills	Scott Franzke (innings 4–6); Dave Wills and Andy Freed (innings 3–4, 7–8; Freed and Wills switch between primary and secondary play-by-play)	Dewayne Staats (innings 5–6)	Chris Wheeler and Larry Andersen; Joe Magrane (innings 5–6 with Staats)
2007	Boston–Colorado	WRKO (Boston); KOA (Colorado)	Joe Castiglione; Jeff Kingery	Glenn Geffner (innings 3–4, 7–8); Jack Corrigan (innings 2–3, 6–7)		
2006	St. Louis–Detroit	KMOX (St. Louis); WXYT (Detroit)	Mike Shannon; Dan Dickerson	John Rooney (innings 3–4, 7–8); Ernie Harwell (inning 2 of Game 1)		Jim Price
2005	Chicago–Houston	WMVP (Chicago); KTRH (Houston)	John Rooney; Milo Hamilton	Ed Farmer (innings 4–5, 7, and odd extra innings [Game 3 went 14 innings]); Alan Ashby (innings 4, 7, 12)		
2004	Boston–St. Louis	WEEI (Boston); KMOX (St. Louis)	Joe Castiglione; Mike Shannon	Jerry Trupiano (innings 3–4, 7–8); Wayne Hagin (innings 3–4, 7–8)		
2003	Florida–N.Y. Yankees	WQAM (Florida); WCBS (N.Y. Yankees)	Dave Van Horne; John Sterling	Jon Sciambi (innings 3–4, 7–8, and even extra innings [Game 4 went 12 innings]); Charley Steiner (innings 5–7, and even extra innings [Game 4 went 12 innings])		
2002	Anaheim–San Francisco	KLAC (Anaheim); KNBR (San Francisco)	Rory Markas; Duane Kuiper	Terry Smith (innings 4–6); Joe Angel (innings 3–4, 7)		Mike Krukow
2001	Arizona–N.Y. Yankees	KTAR (Arizona); WABC (N.Y. Yankees)	Greg Schulte; John Sterling	Thom Brennaman (innings 5–8); Michael Kay (innings 5–7, 10–11 [Game 4 went 10 innings and Game 5 went 12 innings])		Jim Traber (with Schulte) and Rod Allen (with Brennaman)
2000	N.Y. Yankees-N.Y. Mets	WCBS (N.Y. Yankees); WFAN (N.Y. Mets)	John Sterling; Bob Murphy	Michael Kay (innings 5–7, 10–11 [Game 1 went 12 innings]); Gary Cohen (innings 3–4, 7–8, and even extra innings [Game 1 went 12 innings])		

=== 1990s ===
Year	Teams	Flagship stations	Play-by-play #1	Play-by-play #2	Play-by-play #3	Color commentators
1999	N.Y. Yankees–Atlanta	WABC (N.Y. Yankees); WSB (Atlanta)	John Sterling; Skip Caray	Michael Kay; Pete Van Wieren	—N/a	Don Sutton and Joe Simpson
1998	N.Y. Yankees–San Diego	WABC (N.Y. Yankees); KFMB (San Diego)	John Sterling; Jerry Coleman	Michael Kay; Ted Leitner	—N/a	Bob Chandler
1997	Florida–Cleveland	WQAM (Florida); WKNR (Cleveland)	Joe Angel; Herb Score	Dave O'Brien; Tom Hamilton	Jon Sciambi	—N/a
1996	N.Y. Yankees–Atlanta	WABC (N.Y. Yankees); WSB (Atlanta)	John Sterling; Skip Caray	Michael Kay; Pete Van Wieren	—N/a	Don Sutton and Joe Simpson
1995	Atlanta–Cleveland	WSB (Atlanta); WKNR (Cleveland)	Skip Caray; Herb Score	Pete Van Wieren; Tom Hamilton	—N/a	Don Sutton and Joe Simpson
1993	Toronto–Philadelphia	CJCL (Toronto); WOGL (Philadelphia)	Tom Cheek; Harry Kalas	Jerry Howarth (innings 4–6); Andy Musser	Chris Wheeler	Richie Ashburn and Garry Maddox
1992	Toronto–Atlanta	CJCL (Toronto); WGST (Atlanta)	Tom Cheek; Skip Caray	Jerry Howarth (innings 4–6 and even extra innings [Game 6 went 11 innings]); Pete Van Wieren	Ernie Johnson	Don Sutton and Joe Simpson
1991	Minnesota–Atlanta	WCCO (Minnesota); WSB (Atlanta)	Herb Carneal; Skip Caray	John Gordon; Pete Van Wieren	Dave O'Brien	Don Sutton
1990	Cincinnati–Oakland	WLW (Cincinnati); KSFO (Oakland)	Marty Brennaman; Bill King	Joe Nuxhall; Lon Simmons	—N/a	Ray Fosse

=== 1980s ===
Year	Teams	Flagship stations	Play-by-play #1	Play-by-play #2	Color commentators
1989	Oakland–San Francisco	KSFO (Oakland); KNBR (San Francisco)	Bill King; Hank Greenwald	Lon Simmons; Ron Fairly	Ray Fosse
1988	Los Angeles–Oakland	KABC (Los Angeles); KSFO (Oakland)	Ross Porter; Bill King	Don Drysdale; Lon Simmons	Ray Fosse
1987	Minnesota–St. Louis	WCCO (Minnesota); KMOX (St. Louis)	Herb Carneal see notes	John Gordon	—N/a
1986	N.Y. Mets–Boston	WHN (N.Y. Mets); WPLM (Boston)	Bob Murphy; Ken Coleman	Gary Thorne; Joe Castiglione	—N/a
1985	Kansas City–St. Louis	WIBW (Kansas City); KMOX (St. Louis)	Denny Matthews see notes	Fred White	—N/a
1984	Detroit–San Diego	WJR (Detroit); KFMB (San Diego)	Ernie Harwell; Jerry Coleman	Paul Carey; Dave Campbell	—N/a
1983	Baltimore–Philadelphia	WFBR (Baltimore); WCAU (Philadelphia)	Jon Miller; Harry Kalas	Tom Marr; Andy Musser	Richie Ashburn and Chris Wheeler
1982	St. Louis–Milwaukee	KMOX (St. Louis); WISN (Milwaukee)	Jack Buck; Bob Uecker	Mike Shannon; Dwayne Mosley	—N/a

==== Notes ====
- 1982 marked the first time that teams' flagship radio stations were permitted to produce their own local World Series broadcasts and air them live. In prior years, these stations were contractually required to carry the national radio networks' broadcasts (although they could produce re-created games with local announcers and air them after the Series had ended). The affiliate stations in the teams' radio networks continued to be obligated to carry the national broadcasts.
  - After thousands of Phillies fans—outraged over being unable to hear local team announcers Harry Kalas and Richie Ashburn call the games during the 1980 World Series—deluged the team, the networks, and the Commissioner's office with angry letters and petitions, Major League Baseball changed its broadcast contract to allow the flagship radio stations for participating World Series teams to produce and air their own local Series broadcasts beginning in 1982. When the Phillies next won a World Series, in 2008, Kalas was able to make the call of the final out.
- In 1985 and 1987, KMOX, the St. Louis Cardinals' flagship station at the time, simulcast with CBS Radio's World Series coverage involving the Cardinals. That was mainly because Jack Buck had a lengthy career calling Cardinals games for KMOX to go along with his national work for CBS Radio.
