= Fox Sports News =

Fox Sports News is the brand name for a number of sporting news channels, programming, and other media around the world that were either owned or partially owned by News Corporation. These include:

- Fox Sports News (US), a defunct sporting newscast of Fox Sports Networks
- Fox Sports News Asia, a defunct pay television network broadcasting in Asia
- Fox Sports News Australia, an Australian cable and satellite Fox Sports news channel owned by Foxtel
