= National Sports Report =

- Also known as: Fox Sports News
- Genre: Sports news
- Presented by: Various
- Country of origin: United States
- Original language: English

Production
- Production locations: Fox Network Center (Fox Studio Lot Building 101), 10201 W Pico Blvd, Century City, Los Angeles, California
- Camera setup: Multi-camera
- Running time: 30 minutes (previously 60 minutes)
- Production company: Fox Sports Net

Original release
- Network: Fox Sports Net
- Release: November 1, 1996 – February 10, 2002

Related
- Press Box (1990-96); FSN Final Score (2006-11)

The National Sports Report is a sportscast that aired on United States television channel Fox Sports Net.

== Brief history ==
The program premiered on November 1, 1996, when FSN was launched, as Fox Sports News. The show, which succeeded both the Prime Network's Press Box and the short-lived fX Sports Show, aired twice a night, at 6 and 10 p.m (the 10 p.m. edition was later referred to as Fox Sports News Primetime), and also aired in the mornings from 6 to 9 a.m. It was the national network's equivalent to SportsCenter. The 6 p.m. edition was originally anchored by Kevin Frazier (previously co-anchor of The fX Sports Show) with James Worthy and Craig Simpson as analysts; the 10 p.m. report was co-anchored by a rotating team, featuring three holdovers from Press Box (Alan Massengale {himself an ex-SportsCenter anchor}, Tom Kirkland and Randy Sparage), alongside newcomers Dwayne Ballen, Suzy Kolber (also previously of ESPN), John Walls, Paul Rudy and Jeanne Zelasko.

Regular segments of the show included the introduction of the sports headlines at the top of the show with a spinning CGI jumbotron, FoxTrot (which provided a graphically-enhanced recap of games the broadcast was not covering in-depth), FoxScopes (where analysts would put a specific player under the titular "FoxScope" to examine their moves), Stuff You Didn't Know (featuring lesser-known sports factoids) and long-form Spotlight reports.

The show was originally broadcast from Stage 2 of the original Fox Television Center in Los Angeles, before relocating to Stage 2B of the Fox Network Center, located on the 20th Century Fox backlot in LA's Century City district, in late 1997 (by which point a New York bureau, headed by Michael Kay, began operations). For a time, Fox Sports News Primetime Newsbreaks aired on then-sister network FX (which at the time was co-owned by Liberty Media along with many of the FSN affiliates).

In 1998, Keith Olbermann and Chris Myers, both previously of ESPN, were hired and added to the hosting rotation; Olbermann had just come off his first stint at MSNBC, with Fox paying NBC $1 million to let Olbermann out of his contract with them. In concert with Olbermann's debut on January 5, 1999, a new look was introduced (presaging a wide rebrand for Fox Sports Net itself that would roll out shortly afterwards) with a new logo, updated graphics and music, and a modified set; ratings for the program went up the night of Olbermann's debut (having suffered thanks in part to the 1998-99 NBA lockout).

On April 12, 2000, the show was renamed to the National Sports Report (also informally referred to as simply "The National" by the anchors, often during teases for the NSR during the regional reports), with the graphics moving from the previous blue and gold to a new orange-heavy motif; the shows, which continued to trail SportsCenter in the ratings, began to be followed by the Regional Sports Report at 11 p.m. (see below). Other format changes included the addition of more analysts, answering viewer emails on the air, and ending each broadcast with the Final Cut, an extended montage of sports highlights set to music. The NSR also began to air on the newly-renamed Fox Sports Net Florida, which had joined FSN after two years of legal conflicts that prevented it from becoming a full FSN affiliate (it instead aired sportscasts from CNN/SI). Meanwhile, the Sunday night program was briefly renamed The Keith Olbermann Evening News. The hour-long show debuted on August 6, 2000 (with Olbermann making his final appearance on the NSR July 5), anchored by Olbermann solo with Alex Flanagan as a reporter. By April 2001, the NSR had been cut to a mere half-hour show, running at 10:30 p.m. after the Regional Sports Report.

During the program's tenure as NSR, anchor Kevin Frazier (now at Entertainment Tonight) briefly gained attention for refusing to say the name of tennis phenom Anna Kournikova on-air because she had never won a singles tournament. Instead, he used nicknames like "Miss Thang" or "From Russia With Love" (as in the James Bond movie). Frazier wanted to make a point that she was overrated and received too much publicity for her lack of talent.

On April 1, 2001, Olbermann reported that Michael Jordan had decided to come out of retirement and return to NBA basketball with the Washington Wizards. Although the story was presented as an April Fool's joke, Jordan would sign with the Wizards the following September.

The set and anchors of the NSR also appeared on another Fox production, the short-lived sitcom Inside Schwartz, analyzing the decisions of the lead character.

== Regional sports reports ==
Beginning in the summer of 2000, many markets paired the NSR with a Regional Sports Report (the RSR title was originally followed by an (regional name) Edition suffix, before the titling was modified to replace Regional with the actual regional name, e.g. Detroit Sports Report) to better leverage the regional model of the network, typically airing seven nights a week at 11 p.m. following the National Sports Report (the regional reports were moved to 10 p.m. in April 2001), while an earlier Regional Sports Tonight sportscast aired at 7:00 p.m. (in the case of FSN Pittsburgh, their pre-existing SportsBeat, anchored by Stan Savran, continued; the program did adopt the graphics used by the other regional reports). Fox Sports Net Northwest was the first to debut a regional report on June 14, followed by Fox Sports Net West and Fox Sports Net Detroit; the rest of Fox's stations rolled out their reports shortly thereafter. To facilitate easy transfer of stories and footage between FSN and their affiliates, along with some affiliates simply not having enough studio space to produce the reports on their own, a series of interconnected bureaus were set up at many of the FSN affiliates, with some handling the production of more than one regional report:

- New York: New York
- Boston: New England
- Pittsburgh: Pittsburgh, Midwest
- Atlanta: Southern, Arizona
- Dallas: Southwest, Florida
- Chicago: Chicago, Bay Area, and Ohio
- Denver: Rocky Mountain
- Los Angeles: Southern California, Minnesota
- Seattle: Northwest, Detroit

The Southwest Sports Report was originally broadcast from two studios, with the other in Houston. This occurred because co-host Spencer Tillman apparently did not want to uproot his family from Houston.

However, the regional "hub" structure created problems, with one St. Louis newspaper critic noting the Midwest Sports Report's debut was marred by technical glitches and the Pittsburgh-based anchors calling teams by the wrong names; additionally, it was noted the New York Sports Report was somewhat redundant given that MSG Network (which Fox Sports Net New York shared operations with) had already been producing their own standalone sportscast, MSG SportsDesk, and the two sportscasts were nigh-identical (especially since both shows aired the same footage).

== Cancellation ==
In 2002, the NSR was cancelled outright due to declining ratings; FSN opted to instead air two-and-a-half minute news capsules, twice an hour, during primetime programming on nights that did not have live sporting events (beginning at 5:30 PM and continuing to 2:00 AM), as well as four newsbreaks per hour during The Best Damn Sports Show Period, which by this time had become FSN's flagship show (rumors of the NSR's demise in the face of Best Damn's popularity had begun to circulate in December 2001). One problem cited in the NSR's demise was the regional setup making it difficult to assess the national audience for the show. FSN would not "replace" the show until FSN Final Score debuted on July 3, 2006.

None of the regional reports exist today, or hardly resemble the original report format. When the NSR was cancelled, Cablevision, which owned several FSN affiliates at the time, removed them from the networks they owned at the time, pulling the New York (now known as MSG Sportsnet), Chicago (now defunct), Bay Area (now owned by Comcast as NBC Sports Bay Area), and Ohio (now owned by Diamond Sports Group as Bally Sports Ohio) reports from the air. This was due in part to the regional reports not faring well in the ratings on nights without live sports, as well as an advertising recession, forcing Rainbow's hand in cutting their regional reports. The New England Sports Report was the longest-lasting of the former RSRs, having evolved into a talk show, New England Sports Tonight (later renamed to Boston Sports Tonight) after Comcast's acquisition of the network as NBC Sports Boston; a separate news program called SportsNet Central later launched (both shows have since ended as of 2023).

The Fox-owned FSN stations continued with their regional reports for several years; by the mid-2000s, they had been essentially replaced by FSN Live, though in most cases that show was exclusively a team post-game show rather than a regular program, with the team name replacing FSN; news tickers mostly fulfilled the news role for most FSN networks, along with promotions since 2013 guiding viewers to now-former sister network Fox Sports 1's national sports news show (and direct successor to NSR), Fox Sports Live (which has also been cancelled as of 2017). FSN successor Bally Sports (now FanDuel Sports Network) debuted The Rally, produced by sister network Stadium, in 2022 to fulfill the role of a flagship news and analysis show. On October 1, 2025, it was announced that FDSN would premiere a similar 6 p.m. show, FanDuel Sports Network Countdown Live, on October 27, which will feature contributions from the individual FDSN channels and be hosted by former ESPN anchor Stan Verrett.

== Anchors ==
- Dwayne Ballen
- Lionel Bienvienu
- Kevin Frazier
- Kevin Garcia
- Brad Goode
- Tom Kirkland
- Suzy Kolber
- Steve Lyons
- Alan Massengale
- Chris Myers
- Keith Olbermann
- Chris Rose
- Paul Rudy
- Lauren Sanchez
- Randy Sparage
- John Wall
- Van Earl Wright
- Jeanne Zelasko
