= Steve Lyons (baseball) =

American baseball player & broadcaster (born 1960)

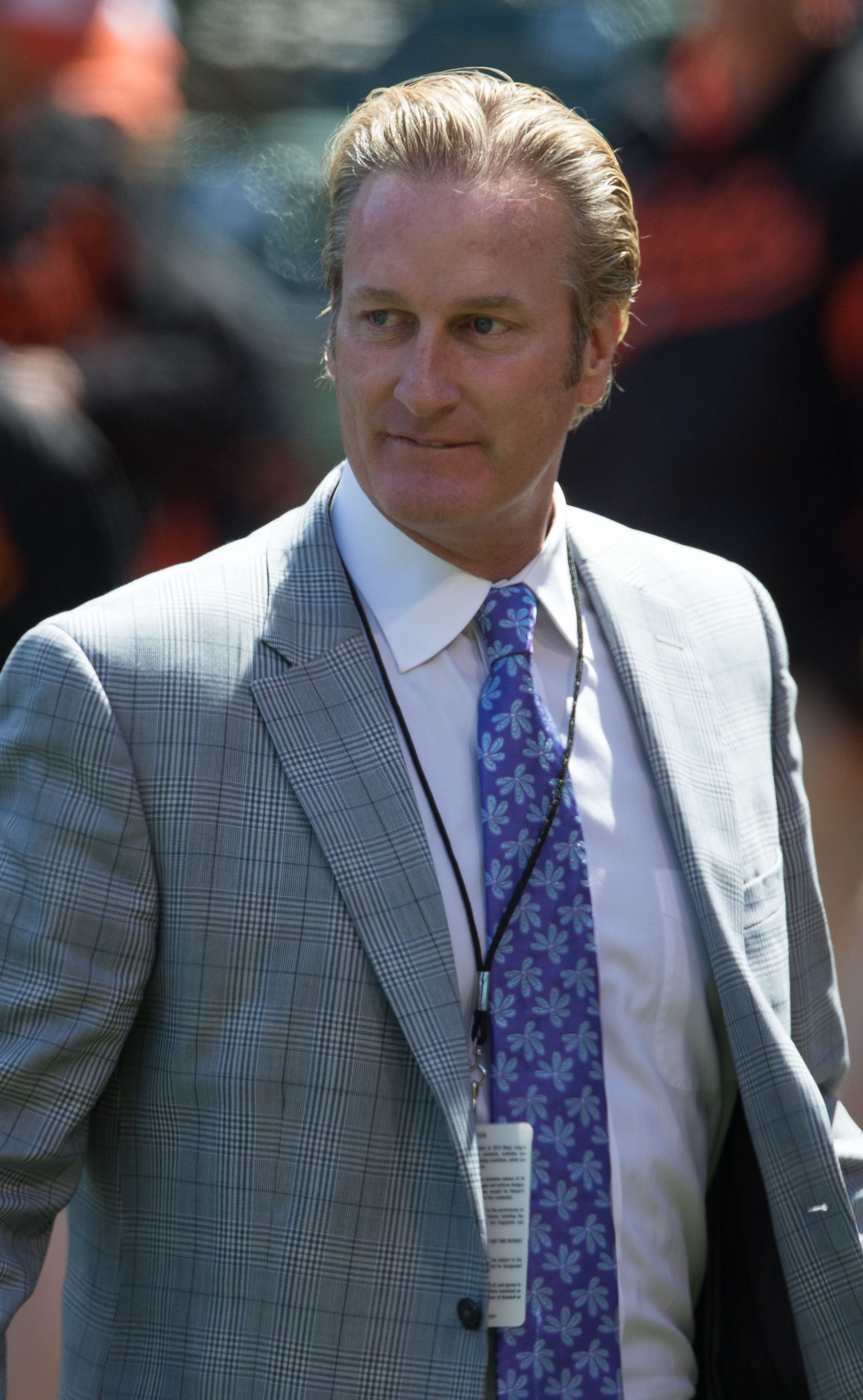
- Lyons in 2013
- Outfielder / Infielder
- Born: June 3, 1960 (age 66); Tacoma, Washington, U.S.
- Batted: Left Threw: Right

MLB debut
- April 15, 1985, for the Boston Red Sox

Last MLB appearance
- October 3, 1993, for the Boston Red Sox

MLB statistics
- Batting average: .252
- Home runs: 19
- Runs batted in: 196
- Stats at Baseball Reference

Teams
- Boston Red Sox (1985–1986); Chicago White Sox (1986–1990); Boston Red Sox (1991); Atlanta Braves (1992); Montreal Expos (1992); Boston Red Sox (1992–1993)

Stephen John Lyons (born June 3, 1960) is an American former professional baseball player who previously worked as a television sportscaster for the New England Sports Network (NESN). He played in Major League Baseball (MLB) for four teams over a period of nine seasons (1985–1993), including four stints with the Boston Red Sox. He was initially an outfielder and third baseman, but found a niche as a utility player. After his retirement as a player, he became a television baseball commentator. In 2021, NESN announced Lyons would not be returning to his in-studio pre- and post-game analyst role.

== Early years ==
Lyons was born in 1960 in Tacoma, Washington, and grew up in Eugene and Beaverton, Oregon. His father, Richard Lyons, was a star athlete at Hudson High School in Massachusetts, who encouraged him to play baseball. He attended Marist Catholic High School in Eugene, before graduating from Beaverton High School in 1978. He attended Oregon State on a partial baseball scholarship. After his junior year, Lyons was a first round draft pick (19th overall) by the Boston Red Sox in the 1981 MLB draft; he left Oregon State without graduating, to begin his baseball career.

== Playing career ==
=== Path to the majors ===
At the start of his professional career, Lyons played for four teams in Boston's farm system: the Single-A Winston-Salem Red Sox in 1981, the Double-A Bristol Red Sox in 1982, the Double-A New Britain Red Sox in 1983, and the Triple-A Pawtucket Red Sox in 1984. He had a .248 batting average while hitting 43 home runs and 222 RBI in 462 minor league games.

=== Boston Red Sox ===
After playing for 3 1/2 years in the minor leagues, Lyons was promoted to the Red Sox in 1985, due in large part to having an impressive spring training; in addition to hitting well, his speed on the bases, and his ability to play a number of positions contributed to the decision. Lyons made his major league debut with the Red Sox on April 15, as a pinch runner at age 24. He collected his first major league hit on April 30, off of Donnie Moore of the California Angels. Starting in early June, Lyons became Boston's regular center fielder; he went on to play 133 games with the 1985 Red Sox, batting .264 with five home runs and 30 RBIs.

In 1986, Lyons appeared in 59 games through late June, batting .250 with one home run and 14 RBIs. On May 10, he was ejected for the only time in his MLB career, by umpire Terry Cooney after arguing a called third strike.

=== Chicago White Sox ===
Lyons was traded to the Chicago White Sox for pitcher Tom Seaver on June 29, 1986. For the remainder of the 1986 season, Lyons played 42 games with the White Sox, batting .203 with six RBIs; he also played 20 games with the Triple-A Buffalo Bisons. During 1987, Lyons split time between Chicago and their Triple-A affiliate, the Hawaii Islanders of the Pacific Coast League. With the White Sox, he batted .280 with one home run and 19 RBIs in 76 games.

Lyons spent all of the 1988 season with Chicago, batting .269 with five home runs and 45 RBIs in 146 games. In 1989, he appeared in 140 games, batting .264 with two home runs and 50 RBIs. He played 94 games in 1990, batting .192 with one home run and 11 RBIs. In parts of five seasons with the White Sox, Lyons appeared in 497 games, batting .255 with nine home runs and 131 RBIs. Lyons was released by the White Sox on April 13, 1991.

==== Playing every position ====
Lyons played every defensive position (including pitcher) as well as designated hitter, pinch hitter, and pinch runner during his time with the White Sox. He also has the rare distinction of having played all nine defensive positions in a single game at the major league level, although in an exhibition contest. The "Windy City Classic," between the Chicago Cubs and the White Sox, took place at Wrigley Field on April 23, 1990. Per standard baseball notation, Lyons's positions during the game were, in order: 2-3-7-8-6-9-5-9-1-4.

=== Second stint with Boston ===
Lyons signed with Boston on April 18, 1991. With the 1991 Red Sox he played in 87 games, batting .241 with four home runs and 17 RBIs. After the season, Lyons became a free agent.

=== Atlanta Braves ===
Lyons signed with the Atlanta Braves in January 1992. He played 11 games for them, batting 1-for-14 (.071) with one RBI. The Braves released him at the end of April.

=== Montreal Expos ===
Lyons signed with the Montreal Expos on May 8, 1992. He played 16 games for them, batting 3-for-13 (.231) with one RBI.

=== Third stint with Boston ===
The Expos sold Lyons to the Red Sox on June 27, 1992. Through the end of the season, Lyons played 21 games for Boston, batting 7-for-28 (.250) with two RBIs. He also played 37 games with Triple-A Pawtucket. After the season, Lyons again became a free agent.

Chicago Cubs

Lyons signed with the Chicago Cubs in early February 1993, and was released in late March.

=== Fourth stint with Boston ===
Lyons again signed with Boston on May 7, 1993. With the 1993 Red Sox he appeared in 28 games, batting 3-for-23 (.130). He also appeared in 67 Triple-A games with Pawtucket. Lyons's final MLB game was on October 3, when he played right field and second base in a 14-inning loss to the Milwaukee Brewers. He became a free agent after the season, but did not continue his playing career. In parts of five seasons with the Red Sox, Lyons played in 328 games, batting .251 with 10 home runs and 63 RBIs.

Lyons's overall MLB career totals include a .252 batting average, 19 home runs, and 196 RBIs in 853 games. He appeared twice as a relief pitcher, giving up four hits and one run in three innings pitched for a 3.00 ERA, while walking four and striking out two.

=== Eccentricities ===
Lyons's colorful personality earned him the nickname "Psycho". He was known for such eccentricities as playing tic-tac-toe and hangman against opposing players during games, using spikes to mark the infield dirt.

His most remembered incident occurred at Tiger Stadium in Detroit on a Monday night in 1990. In a televised game played on July 16, he created a stir that was replayed countless times. After sliding headfirst into first base to beat out a bunt hit, Lyons pulled down his pants to empty the dirt out and brush off his shirttail. After a few seconds (and a reaction from the crowd of over 14,000), he realized what he had just done and quickly pulled them up, humorously embarrassed. Although wearing sliding shorts under his White Sox uniform, this incident earned him another nickname, "Moon Man" Lyons. At the end of the inning, women in the stands waved dollar bills at him as he came to the dugout.

And the jokes began, "No one had ever dropped his drawers on the field. Not Wally Moon. Not Blue Moon Odom. Not even Heinie Manush." wrote one columnist. Within 24 hours of the "exposure," he received more exposure than he had received in his entire career; seven live television and approximately 20 radio interviews. Lyons himself once stated, "We've got this pitcher, Mélido Pérez, who earlier this month pitched a no-hitter, and I'll guarantee you he didn't do two live television shots afterward. I pull my pants down, and I do seven. Something's pretty skewed toward the zany in this game." In a later interview, Lyons said that, in the moment of dropping his pants, "I just brain-cramped."

== Broadcasting career ==
=== Fox Sports ===
After his retirement from the playing field, Lyons became a color analyst for Fox Sports' MLB coverage in 1996, working first in a studio pregame show with Chip Caray and Keith Olbermann, and later on game coverage, usually with Thom Brennaman. He called several Division Series and League Championship Series telecasts for the network. Lyons also served as an anchor for Fox Sports News (later renamed the National Sports Report), Fox's ill-fated national sports news show and rival to SportsCenter.

==== Fox firing ====
During their broadcast of Game 3 of the 2006 American League Championship Series (ALCS), broadcast colleague Lou Piniella, who is of Spanish descent, used an analogy about finding a wallet, and then spoke briefly in Spanish. Lyons said Piniella was "hablaing Español" – Spanglish for "speaking Spanish" – and added, "I still can't find my wallet. I don't understand him, and I don't want to sit close to him now." On October 13, 2006, Fox fired Lyons for making the remarks. Lyons was replaced for the last game of the series in Detroit by Los Angeles Angels announcer José Mota. Piniella later stated that he thought that Lyons was just "kidding" and that Lyons was, per Piniella's experience, not bigoted.

=== Los Angeles Dodgers ===
From 2005 to 2013, Lyons served as color analyst for the Los Angeles Dodgers on Prime Ticket and KCAL on television broadcasts originating from outside the NL West, broadcasting first alongside Charley Steiner and then Eric Collins. He also co-hosted the Dodgers pre-game and post-game shows for Prime Ticket.

Following Lyons's firing by Fox during the 2006 ALCS, on October 16, 2006, the Dodgers announced that they would keep Lyons as a commentator for their road games. The team said that they gave Lyons probationary guidelines and that he would undergo diversity training. Lyons also continued to host the Dodgers' post-game show, Dodgers Live.

On October 12, 2013, Lyons announced that he would not be returning to the Dodgers the following season.

=== Boston Red Sox ===
In 2014, Lyons joined the New England Sports Network (NESN) as a studio analyst and occasional game analyst for NESN's coverage of the Red Sox.

In 2017, Lyons took a leave of absence, starting in June, from his broadcasting job with NESN. In August, it became public that Lyons had been arrested for domestic battery in January, with the arresting officer reporting that Lyons's girlfriend had suffered facial injuries. On August 15, 2017, the three misdemeanor charges against Lyons were dropped in superior court in Torrance, California, after it was determined that the photos taken of Lyons's girlfriend in January had been lost by the police, leading to the dismissal. Lyons's leave of absence extended through the remainder of the 2017 MLB season.

Lyons returned to NESN for the 2018 MLB season, calling Red Sox spring training games with Dave O'Brien, and during the regular season has served as an in-studio analyst and fill-in color commentator. Lyons was not brought back for the 2021 season and beyond.

=== Other broadcasting ===
In the mid-1990s, Lyons worked for WMVP in Chicago, and as an analyst for ESPN and ESPN2. He was part of the Arizona Diamondbacks' broadcast crew in 2003 and 2004. Lyons made his debut video game appearance as a broadcaster in All-Star Baseball 2005 along with Thom Brennaman. He has also been a broadcaster in the MLB: The Show series.

=== Controversial broadcasting remarks ===
Lyons has been criticized for making insensitive comments in the broadcast booth on multiple occasions.

Lyons maligned outfielder Shawn Green, who is Jewish, for sitting out a game on Yom Kippur in 2004, saying, "He's not even a practicing Jew. He didn't marry a Jewish girl. And from what I understand, he never had a bar mitzvah, which is unfortunate, because he doesn't get the money." Lyons was suspended briefly without pay after his remarks, and the network apologized for Lyons's comments, although Lyons never made an on-air apology.

In August 2006, while working an Angels-Yankees game, Lyons discussed Italian American Yankees' catcher Sal Fasano, and the fact that he had to shave his mustache to accommodate owner George Steinbrenner's grooming code. Responding to a comment by his fellow Fox sportscaster about how one doesn't want to cross Fasano, Lyons replied, "Well, you know, Fasano is the type of guy 'who knows a guy that knows a guy'."

Lyons and fellow sportscaster Thom Brennaman made fun of a 64-year-old New York Mets fan wearing an unusual device over his eyes at a game during Game 2 of the 2006 National League Division Series between the Mets and Dodgers, with Lyons saying, "He's got a digital camera stuck to his face." The man turned out to be nearly blind, except for limited peripheral vision in one eye, and he was wearing a JORDY, a magnifying device that helped him to see the game. Brennaman later apologized to the man and his family on-air during Game 3 of the series.

== Personal life ==
Lyons is of French and Irish descent, and as of 2017 resides in Hermosa Beach, California. In 1995, he published a book, PSYCHOanalysis, with foreword by Stephen King, of his personal observations and stories about baseball.
