= Jeanne Zelasko =

Baseball announcer (born 1966)

- Born: October 26, 1966 (age 60); Cincinnati, Ohio, U.S.
- Education: San Diego State University
- Years active: 1993–present

Jeanne Zelasko (born October 26, 1966) is an American journalist and sportscaster who worked for "The Beast" AM980 KFWB and Fox Sports West in Los Angeles County, California. Prior to taking that position Zelasko had a relatively lengthy career working for Fox Sports as a reporter and analyst for various programs, as well as reporting for MLB Network, ESPN and as the court reporter on Judge Joe Brown.

== Early life and education ==
Zelasko started her broadcasting career during her college days at San Diego State University doing metro traffic reports and then hosting a talk show on KCEO radio. Her television career began at KDCI-TV News in San Diego in 1993 anchoring the weekend newscasts.

== Career ==
Early in her career, Zelasko co-hosted the San Diego Padres pre-game show for Prime Sports West, a regional sports network in Southern California (now Fox Sports Net West). While working as an assignment reporter for the network, she covered a variety of sports including the NFL, NHL, college basketball and auto racing.

=== Fox Sports ===
Zelasko was hired by Fox Sports in 1996 as part of the original broadcast team anchoring the newly formed Fox Sports Net's National Sports Report, as well as a sideline reporter for Fox NFL Sunday. In February 2001, Zelasko joined NASCAR on Fox as a pit reporter. In June of the same year, she became the studio host for Major League Baseball on Fox alongside analyst Kevin Kennedy.

Fox Sports canceled the Major League Baseball pre-game show (as a cost-cutting measure) following the 2008 season.

=== MLB Network and Los Angeles Dodgers ===
In April 2009, Zelasko took on multiple roles, including special assignments for MLB Tonight, on MLB Network; she made her MLB play-by-play debut with the Los Angeles Dodgers on May 20, 2009, making her the first woman to do play-by-play for a Dodgers game. Zelasko worked for the rest of the 2009 season alongside former Dodger Mark Sweeney, who served as an analyst, on these Web-only broadcasts of all Wednesday Dodgers home games.

=== ESPN ===
In May 2013, Zelasko began covering the NCAA Softball tournament for ESPN.

=== Filmwork ===
In 1997, she had a guest role in the fourth-season finale of the CBS TV series Diagnosis: Murder. In 2002, she had a cameo as an anchorwoman in the Swiss motion picture Birdseye, and played a reporter in Fever Pitch.

From 2010 to 2013, she filled the role of court reporter on Judge Joe Brown.

=== Personal ===
Zelasko was married to Curt Sandoval, a sports anchor and reporter for ABC-owned KABC-TV in Los Angeles.

On December 30, 2007, Fox announced that Zelasko was being treated for thyroid cancer. She was still scheduled to host Fox's on-site pregame show, and serve as a sideline reporter on Fox's Cotton Bowl Classic and Orange Bowl broadcasts. Fox spokesman Dan Bell said: "She'll be out for as long as her treatment takes. We can't wait to have her back in her MLB studio chair in April."
