= Bill Corum =

American journalist (1895–1958)

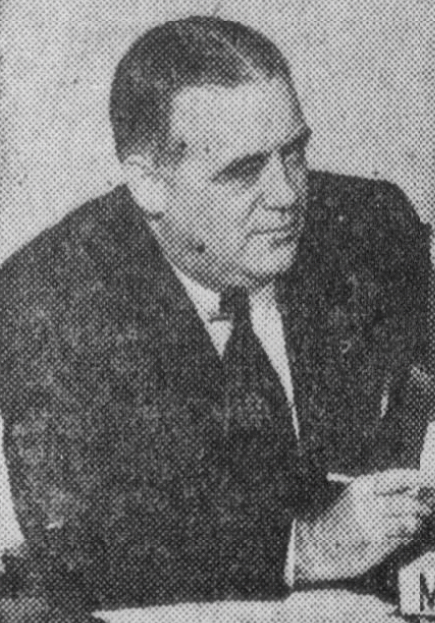
- Corum in a 1944 publication
- Born: Martene Windsor Corum; July 20, 1895; Speed, Missouri, US
- Died: December 16, 1958 (aged 63)
- Occupation(s): Journalist, announcer, horseracing executive

Martene Windsor "Bill" Corum (July 20, 1895 – December 16, 1958) was an American journalist, announcer, and horseracing executive. He was a sports columnist for the New York Evening Journal and the New York Journal-American, and served as president of Churchill Downs for nine years. He is widely credited for coining the term "Run for the Roses" to describe the Kentucky Derby.

== Early life and education ==
Corum was born on July 20, 1895, in Speed, Missouri. He attended high school in Boonville, Missouri and graduated from Wentworth Military Academy in Lexington, Missouri in 1913. He then entered the University of Missouri, graduating in 1917.

Corum enlisted in the U.S. Army upon the United States entry into World War I and would later earn a commission. He served as company commander of Company D, 101st Infantry Battalion of the 96th Infantry Division and, at age 23, was the youngest major in the Army during the war.

Following the war, Corum entered the Columbia University School of Journalism, while working as a copy editor at The New York Times. He then became assistant sports editor after graduating from Columbia.

== Career ==
In 1924, Corum was assigned to the baseball beat covering the Brooklyn Dodgers. In July 1925, he left The Times for the New York Evening Journal to cover the New York Giants. By 1926, Corum became the Journal's lead columnist. His first column appeared July 28, 1926. Over the next 32 years, he filed nearly 10,000 columns with the Evening Journal and, following the merger of Hearst's morning and afternoon papers, the New York Journal-American, becoming one of the nation's most recognizable sports columnists and radio personalities.

On radio, Corum called the Kentucky Derby with Clem McCarthy, and the World Series with Red Barber among others. Starting with the first Joe Louis vs. Billy Conn heavyweight title fight on June 18, 1941, Corum joined announcer Don Dunphy as ringside color commentator. Over the next twelve years, Dunphy and Corum called nearly 500 major fights on Gillette's Friday Night Fights from New York's Madison Square Garden. Along with Damon Runyon, Grantland Rice, Ring Lardner, Red Smith, Walter Winchell, John Drebinger, and Max Kase, Corum was a major player in sports radio and news in the 1930s, 1940s and 1950s. Runyon described Corum as follows: "He is short, chubby and debonair. He looks cheerful and lives cheerfully [...] he writes about sports events as he sees them, and he always sees them a little more clearly than the rest of us. No more popular chap than Bill Corum ever lived in this man's town. He is one of the ablest journalists of these times and one of the grandest guys."

In 1947, Corum was named executive vice president of Suffolk Downs.

When Matt Winn died after serving as president of Churchill Downs for 47 years in 1949, Corum was named to succeed him. Corum had called the Kentucky Derby on radio for most of the previous quarter century and had coined the term "Run for the Roses" in 1925. He oversaw the first televised broadcast of the Derby in 1952 and took on major expansion projects at the racetrack. During that time, he continued to write his daily column and hosted The Bill Corum Sports Show on television.

Corum died on December 16, 1958, aged 63.
