= Canadian Forces Radio and Television =

Defunct radio/TV network for the Canadian Armed Forces

English logo

French logo

Canadian Forces Radio and Television (CFRT), Radiotélévision des Forces canadiennes (RTFC) in French, was a television and radio network system broadcast by satellite to those members of the Canadian Forces ground forces who served overseas in places such as the Middle East, Africa and Europe and, due to popular demand, the service began broadcasting to His Majesty's Canadian Ships in April 2002. The network was not available domestically within Canada.

The network consisted of two separate feeds, one for each of Canada's official languages, English and French, sourcing programming from the CBC/Radio-Canada, and commercial networks such as CTV and TVA.

On February 5, 2014, CFRT announced it would cease operations in April 2014. The closure was due to a reduction of Canadian military personnel serving overseas and budget cuts by the Canadian government, as well as advancements in other avenues of television and radio broadcasting. The final broadcast ended April 1, 2014, at 00:00 EST.

Broadcasts to Canadian forces in Europe began in 1951. The Canadian Forces Network (CFN), or Reseau des Forces Canadiennes (RFC), made radio broadcasts from Brunssum, the Netherlands from 1978 until September 30, 2014, to Brunssum, Ramstein Air Base and Lahr (Baden-Württemberg) in Germany and Supreme Headquarters Allied Powers Europe (SHAPE) in Casteau, Belgium. CFN Europe was broadcast on the Astra 1A satellite, until its decommissioning in December 2004, and later on the Eutelsat 9A satellite.

The network kept Canadian military personnel overseas in touch with Canada and Canadian defence news. In countries where telephone service is difficult, families could send broadcast messages to soldiers abroad through an 800 number.

An earlier Canadian Forces Network was established and operated by the Canadian Broadcasting Corporation in 1945 for Canadian troops in England following the closure of the BBC Allied Expeditionary Forces Programme which had included shows for Canadian military personnel. The station, which transmitted programs to Canadian Forces stationed in Europe after World War II, was established with the cooperation of the Canadian Broadcasting Corporation and the BBC and augmented broadcasts by the CBC International Service on shortwave from Canada.

== See also ==
- American Forces Network
- British Forces Broadcasting Service
- Israel Army Radio
