= 2008 World Series =

104th edition of Major League Baseball's championship series

Team (Wins)	Managers	Season
Philadelphia Phillies (4)	Charlie Manuel	92–70 (.568), GA: 3
Tampa Bay Rays (1)	Joe Maddon	97–65 (.599), GA: 2
- Dates: October 22–29
- Venue(s): Tropicana Field (St. Petersburg); Citizens Bank Park (Philadelphia)
- MVP: Cole Hamels (Philadelphia)
- Umpires: Tim Welke (crew chief), Kerwin Danley, Fieldin Culbreth, Tom Hallion, Jeff Kellogg, Tim Tschida
- Hall of Famers: Phillies: Pat Gillick (GM); Rays: None

Broadcast
- Television: Fox (United States – English); Fox Deportes (United States – Spanish); MLB International (International)
- TV announcers: Joe Buck, Tim McCarver, Chris Myers, and Ken Rosenthal (Fox); Ángel Torres, Miguel Morales, and Cos Villa (Fox Deportes); Dave O'Brien and Rick Sutcliffe (MLB International)
- Radio: ESPN; WPHT (PHI – English); WDAS (PHI – Spanish); WHNZ (TB – English); WGES (TB – Spanish)
- Radio announcers: Jon Miller and Joe Morgan (ESPN); Harry Kalas, Scott Franzke, Larry Andersen, and Chris Wheeler (WPHT); Danny Martinez, Bill Kulik, and Juan Ramos (WDAS); Dave Wills, Andy Freed, Dewayne Staats, and Joe Magrane (WHNZ); Ricardo Taveras and Enrique Oliu (WGES)
- ALCS: Tampa Bay Rays over Boston Red Sox (4–3)
- NLCS: Philadelphia Phillies over Los Angeles Dodgers (4–1)

The 2008 World Series was the championship series of Major League Baseball's (MLB) 2008 season. The 104th edition of the World Series, it was a best-of-seven playoff between the National League (NL) champion Philadelphia Phillies and the American League (AL) champion Tampa Bay Rays; the Phillies won the series, four games to one. The 2008 World Series is notable because it is the only World Series to involve a mid-game postponement and resumption (two days later).

The Series began on Wednesday, October 22, and concluded (after weather delays had postponed the end of Game 5) the following Wednesday, October 29. The AL's 4–3 win in the 2008 All-Star Game gave the Rays home field advantage for the series, meaning no more than three games would be played at Citizens Bank Park (the Phillies' home ballpark). The Phillies won their second championship in their 126-year history to bring the city of Philadelphia its first championship in 25 years (since the 1983 NBA Finals). This was the first postseason series lost by an MLB team based in the state of Florida; previously, the Rays and Florida Marlins were 8–0 in postseason series. Additionally, both the Phillies' World Series wins have come against a team making their World Series debut (in 1980, they beat the Kansas City Royals).

The Phillies advanced to the World Series after defeating the Milwaukee Brewers and the Los Angeles Dodgers in the NL's Divisional Series and Championship Series, respectively. The team won its position in the playoffs after its second consecutive NL East division title. This was the Phillies' first World Series appearance in fifteen years. The Tampa Bay Rays advanced to the World Series after defeating the Chicago White Sox and the Boston Red Sox, the 2007 World Series champion, in the AL's Division Series and 2008 American League Championship Series. This was the first World Series since 2001 to not feature a Wild Card team.

Games 1 and 2 at Tropicana Field were the first World Series games played on artificial turf since the 1993 World Series, which coincidentally featured the Phillies (who utilized the surface until 2003); 2008 is the first World Series ever played on second generation artificial turf.

== Teams ==
=== Philadelphia Phillies ===
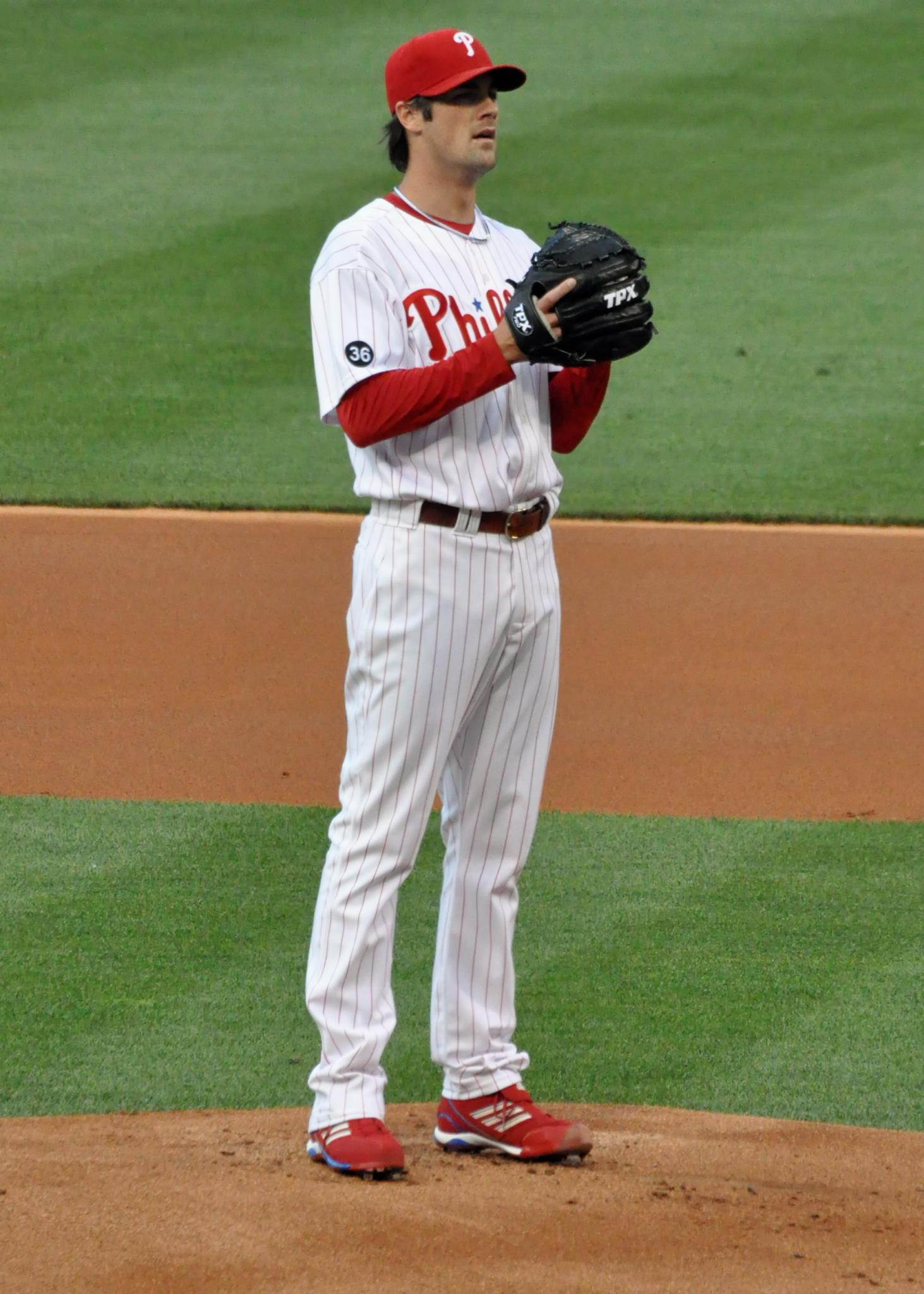
Philadelphia left-hander Cole Hamels, pictured here during the 2010 regular season, won Game 1 and pitched six effective innings in Game 5, and was named the World Series MVP.

Philadelphia opened the season by posting a winning record in the opening month of April. The team scored 60 runs over a five-game span in late May and went 14–4 into the beginning of June. The team lost 9 of 11 games to end June, but came out of the All-Star break with a 9–6 record following the midseason hiatus. The Phillies posted the best road record in the National League, at 44–37. Philadelphia traded sweeps with the Los Angeles Dodgers in August and went 13–3 in their last 16 games, to win the National League East title for the second consecutive season. The second-seeded Phillies defeated the Milwaukee Brewers in the Division Series, 3–1, and the Dodgers in the Championship Series, 4–1, to book their place in the 2008 Fall Classic. This was the Phillies' first World Series appearance in fifteen years.

=== Tampa Bay Rays ===
The Tampa Bay Rays also began the season (their first after dropping the "Devil" from their name) with a winning record in the opening month of April. The Rays became the first team since 1903 to have the league's best record on Memorial Day (the last Monday in May) after finishing in last place the previous season. The team went 16–10 in June, but lost seven consecutive games leading up to the All-Star break. In August, the Rays lost seven games to finish out the month with an overall record of 84–51. The team concluded the season, albeit with a 13–14 record in September, by winning the American League East title for the first time in franchise history. As the Devil Rays, they had never finished with a winning record, nor finished higher than fourth in their division. The second-seeded Rays beat the Chicago White Sox 3–1 in the American League Division Series. In the American League Championship Series, Tampa Bay defeated the defending World Series champion Boston Red Sox in seven games after nearly blowing a 3-1 series lead, to advance to their first World Series in franchise history. The Rays became the third MLB team in the post-1969 "Divisional Era" to make the World Series in their first trip to the playoffs, joining the 1969 New York Mets and the 1997 Florida Marlins.

== Summary ==
Philadelphia won the series, 4–1.

Game	Date	Score	Location	Time	Attendance
1	October 22	Philadelphia Phillies – 3, Tampa Bay Rays – 2	Tropicana Field	3:23	40,783
2	October 23	Philadelphia Phillies – 2, Tampa Bay Rays – 4	Tropicana Field	3:05	40,843
3	October 25	Tampa Bay Rays – 4, Philadelphia Phillies – 5	Citizens Bank Park	3:41	45,900
4	October 26	Tampa Bay Rays – 2, Philadelphia Phillies – 10	Citizens Bank Park	3:08	45,903
5	October 27†/29	Tampa Bay Rays – 3, Philadelphia Phillies – 4	Citizens Bank Park	3:28	45,940

† - Game suspended in the sixth inning due to rain.

== Game summaries ==
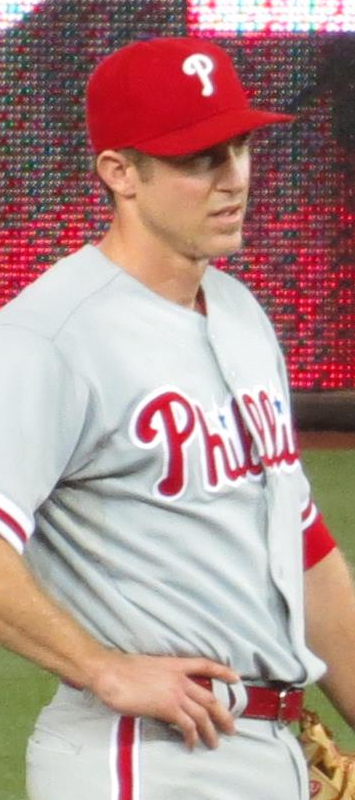
Chase Utley hit a two-run home run to open the scoring in the series.

=== Game 1 ===
October 22, 2008 8:37 pm (EDT) at Tropicana Field in St. Petersburg, Florida 73 °F (23 °C), dome
Team	1	2	3	4	5	6	7	8	9	R	H	E
Philadelphia	2	0	0	1	0	0	0	0	0	3	8	1
Tampa Bay	0	0	0	1	1	0	0	0	0	2	5	1
WP: Cole Hamels (1–0) LP: Scott Kazmir (0–1) Sv: Brad Lidge (1); Home runs: PHI: Chase Utley (1); TB: Carl Crawford (1); Attendance: 40,783; Boxscore

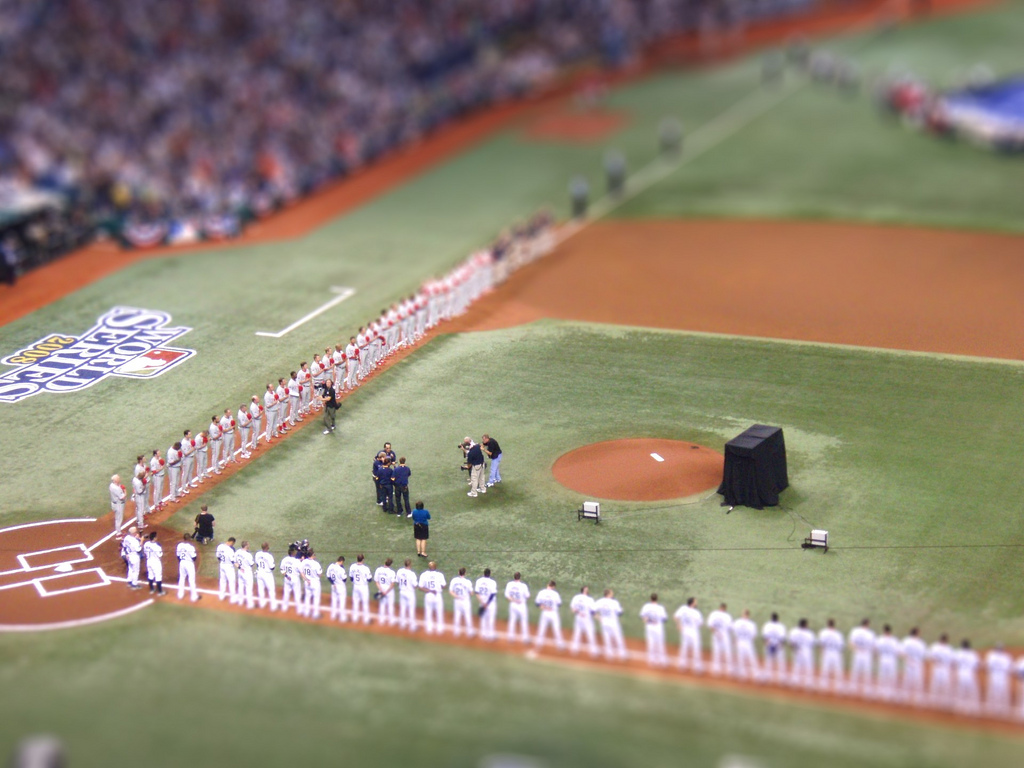
The teams on the field before Game 1

The national anthem was performed by Backstreet Boys. The Phillies scored the first runs of the Series when Jayson Werth walked and Chase Utley followed with a two-run home run in the top of the first inning. The Phillies loaded the bases off Tampa Bay starting pitcher Scott Kazmir with one out in the second, but Kazmir induced a fly ball from Jimmy Rollins, which was too shallow to score Shane Victorino, who was thrown out at home plate by B. J. Upton for a double play. The Rays loaded the bases off Phillies starter Cole Hamels with one out in the bottom of the third, but he also escaped this jam by getting Upton to ground into an inning-ending double play, and the score remained 2–0 in favor of Philadelphia. The Phillies extended their lead to 3–0 on Carlos Ruiz's RBI groundout in the fourth inning. In the bottom of the inning, Carl Crawford's solo home run pulled the Rays to within two runs. Tampa Bay added their second run the following inning on Akinori Iwamura's RBI double. Kazmir was removed after six innings; four Rays relievers combined to shut out the Phillies for the last three innings. Ryan Madson relieved Hamels in the eighth, pitching a single perfect inning. In the top of the ninth, Philadelphia left two men on base, but Brad Lidge remained perfect in saves as he delivered a one-two-three inning to seal the 3–2 win.

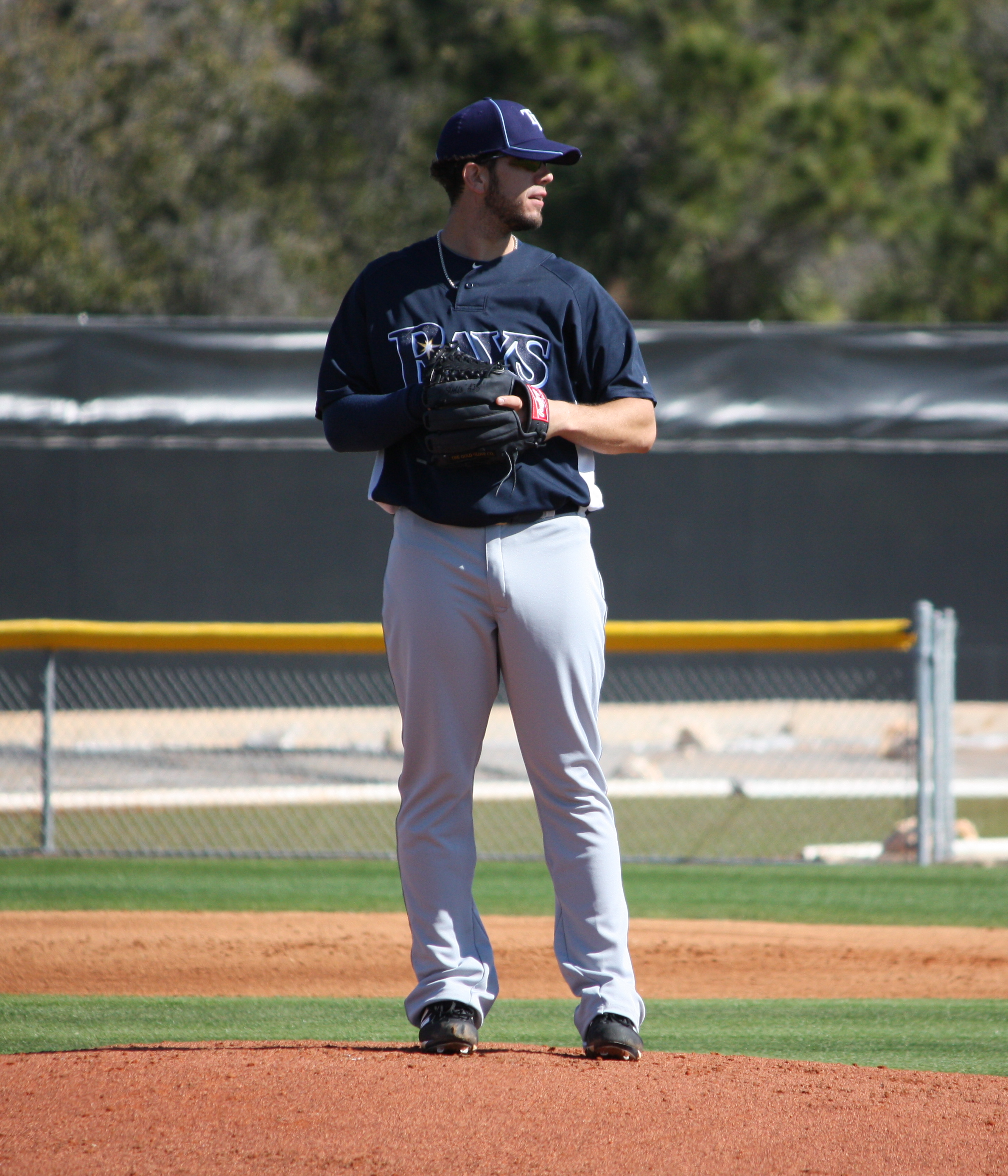
James Shields pitched 5 2/3 innings of shutout baseball to give the Rays their first-ever World Series win.

=== Game 2 ===
October 23, 2008 8:37 pm (EDT) at Tropicana Field in St. Petersburg, Florida 73 °F (23 °C), dome
Team	1	2	3	4	5	6	7	8	9	R	H	E
Philadelphia	0	0	0	0	0	0	0	1	1	2	9	2
Tampa Bay	2	1	0	1	0	0	0	0	x	4	7	1
WP: James Shields (1–0) LP: Brett Myers (0–1); Home runs: PHI: Eric Bruntlett (1); TB: None; Attendance: 40,843; Boxscore

The national anthem was performed by Los Lonely Boys. Tampa Bay took a quick 2–0 lead in the first inning when Akinori Iwamura and B. J. Upton reached base with nobody out and scored on back-to-back groundouts by Carlos Peña and Evan Longoria. The next inning, Upton's RBI single scored Dioner Navarro. Rocco Baldelli attempted to score from second base, but was thrown out at home by Jayson Werth, keeping the Rays' lead at 3–0. Cliff Floyd extended the lead to 4–0 after leading off the bottom of the fourth with a single, advancing to third base with assistance from Navarro and Baldelli, and scoring on a sacrifice bunt by Jason Bartlett. Tampa Bay starter James Shields shut out the Phillies through 5 2/3 innings to earn the win, before being relieved by Dan Wheeler who pitched an additional scoreless inning. Philadelphia starter Brett Myers lasted seven innings, giving up four runs for the loss. The Phillies did not get on the board until the eighth when Eric Bruntlett hit a solo home run (his first since May 6) off David Price. The Phillies added another run off Price in the ninth when Carlos Ruiz hit a leadoff double, then scored with one out on an error by Longoria. Despite this, Price retired the next two batters to end the game, and the Rays' 4–2 win tied the Series at one game apiece. For the rest of the Series, the Rays would not take the lead over the Phillies again.

This would be the last World Series game played in Tampa or at Tropicana Field until Game 3 of the 2026 World Series. (The Rays' next World Series appearance in 2020 was played entirely at Globe Life Field in Arlington as a neutral site due to the COVID-19 pandemic.)

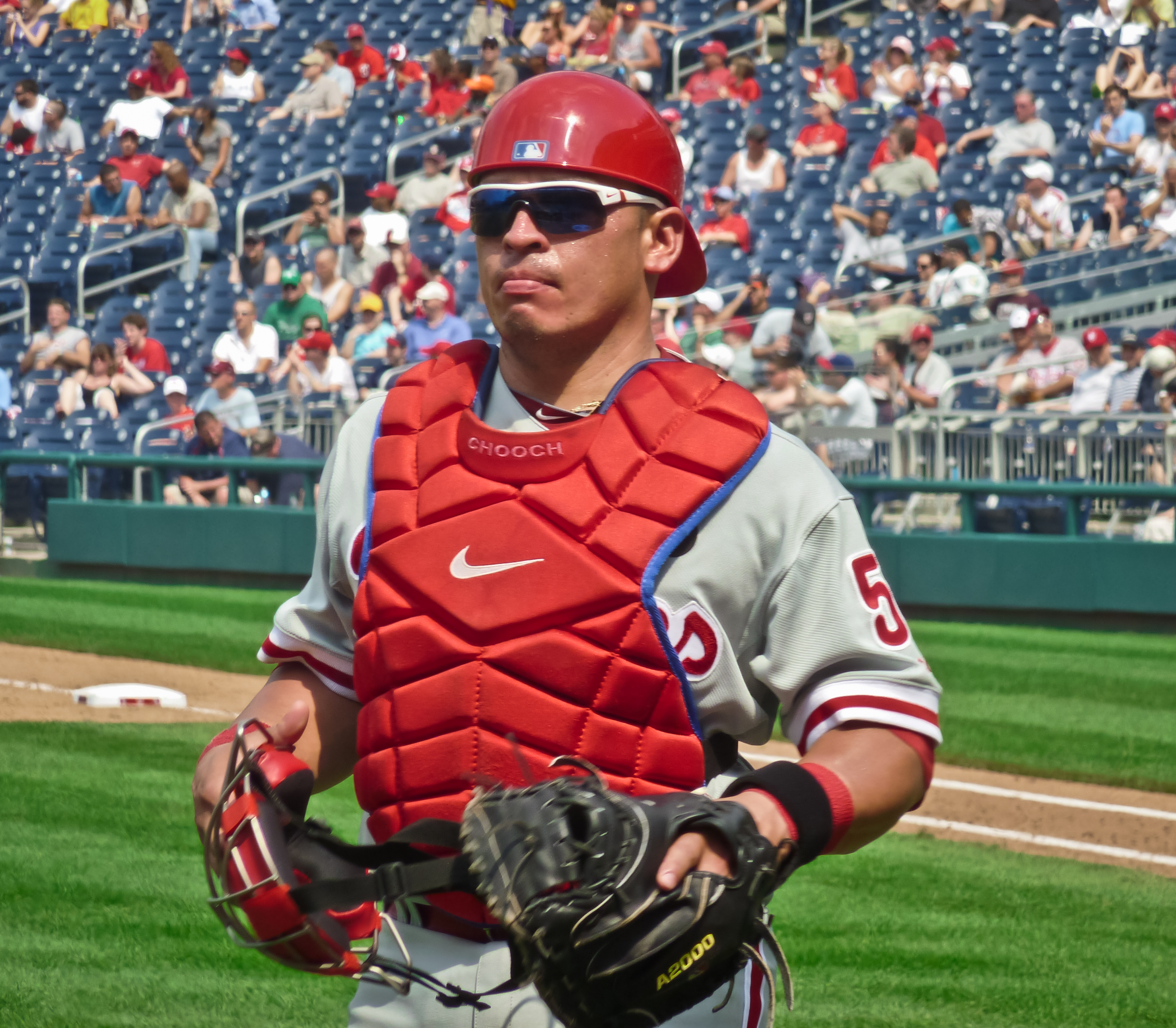
Carlos Ruiz drove in the winning run in Game 3 on a walk-off infield single in the ninth inning.

=== Game 3 ===
October 25, 2008 10:08 pm (EDT) at Citizens Bank Park in Philadelphia, Pennsylvania 54 °F (12 °C), overcast
Team	1	2	3	4	5	6	7	8	9	R	H	E
Tampa Bay	0	1	0	0	0	0	2	1	0	4	6	1
Philadelphia	1	1	0	0	0	2	0	0	1	5	7	1
WP: J. C. Romero (1–0) LP: J. P. Howell (0–1); Home runs: TB: None; PHI: Carlos Ruiz (1), Chase Utley (2), Ryan Howard (1); Attendance: 45,900; Boxscore

Steve Carlton threw out the Ceremonial First pitch while Taylor Swift sang the national anthem. The third game of the Series was delayed for an hour and 31 minutes because of rain. Country music star Tim McGraw, son of Phillies reliever Tug McGraw, spread his father's ashes on the pitching mound of Citizens Bank Park, prior to the game's start. The Phillies scored in the bottom of the first inning after Jimmy Rollins led off with a single and eventually scored on a Chase Utley groundout. In the top of the second, Carl Crawford doubled, stole third base and scored on a sacrifice fly by Gabe Gross to tie the game at 1–1. Carlos Ruiz gave the Phillies their second lead of the night when he hit a home run in the bottom half. Starting pitchers Matt Garza and Jamie Moyer pitched six and 6 1/3 innings, respectively. The score remained 2–1 in favor of Philadelphia until the sixth when Utley and Ryan Howard hit the 14th back-to-back home runs in World Series history, increasing their lead to 4–1. The Rays rallied to cut their deficit back to one run in the seventh. Moyer surrendered back-to-back hits to Crawford and Dioner Navarro to start the inning, and Crawford scored on a groundout by Gross, prompting Charlie Manuel to go to his bullpen. Chad Durbin relieved Moyer and induced a groundout from Jason Bartlett, scoring Navarro and trimming the Phillies' lead to 4–3. In the top of the eighth, B.J. Upton led off with an infield single, stole second and third, and scored on a throwing error by Ruiz, tying the game at 4–4. Eric Bruntlett was hit by a pitch by J.P. Howell leading off the bottom of the ninth, moved to second on a wild pitch by Grant Balfour and to third on a throwing error by Navarro, putting the potential winning run on third with nobody out. Balfour intentionally walked the next two batters, Shane Victorino and pinch-hitter Greg Dobbs, to load the bases, creating a force play at the plate. Tampa Bay then brought the infield in (including right fielder Ben Zobrist who was brought in to be a fifth infielder), hoping to convert any ground ball into a forceout at home and prevent the winning run from scoring. However, Ruiz's 45-foot infield single brought in Bruntlett for the win. The hit was fielded by third baseman Evan Longoria, who threw desperately to the plate in an attempt to keep the game going. However, any hope of an out vanished as Longoria's throw missed Navarro and Bruntlett scored (it would not be counted as an error). Ruiz's hit was the first walk-off infield single in World Series history, giving the Phillies a 5–4 victory and a 2–1 lead in the series. Phillies reliever J. C. Romero earned the win and Howell took the loss.

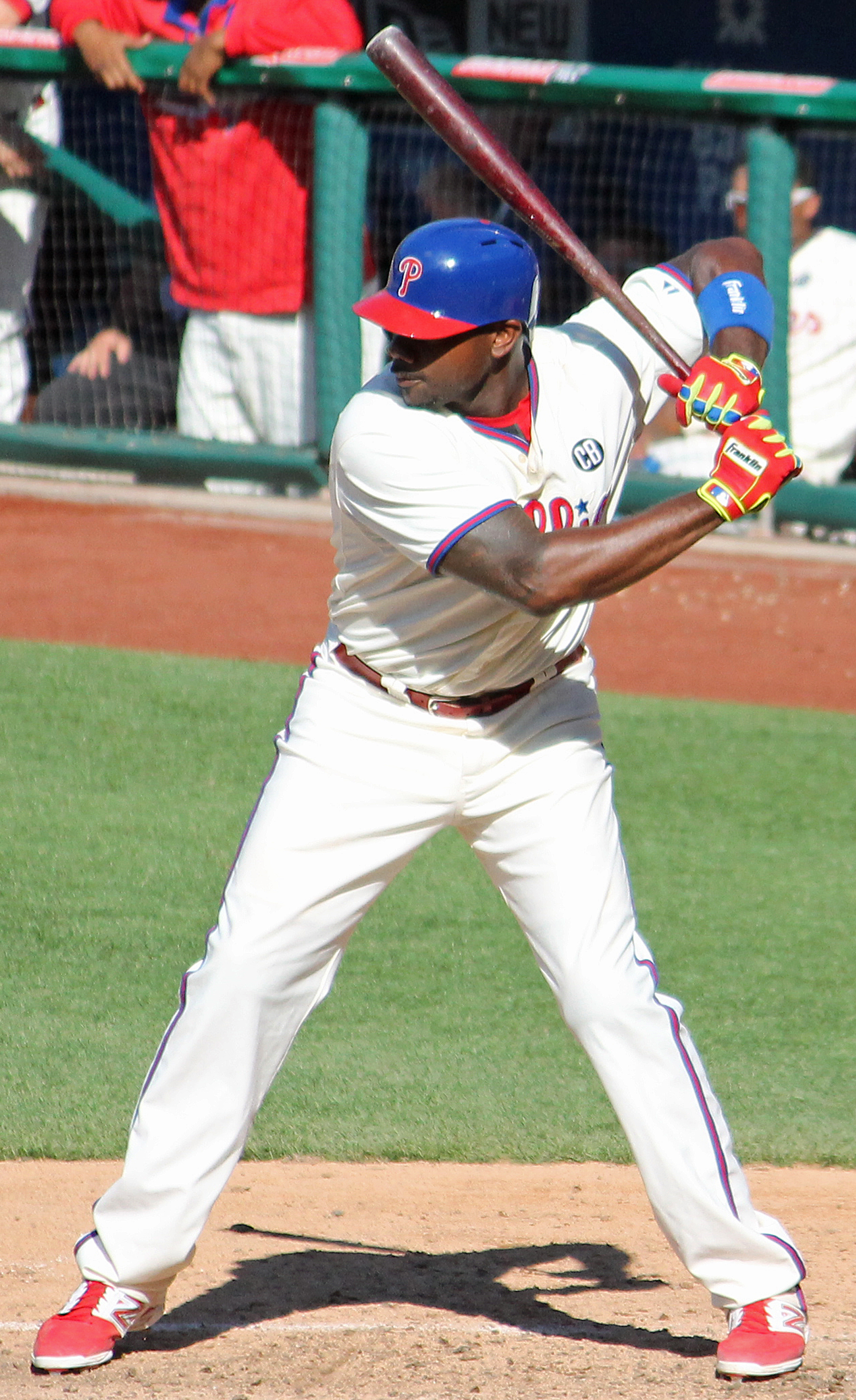
Ryan Howard hit two home runs for the Phillies in Game 4.

=== Game 4 ===
October 26, 2008 8:29 pm (EDT) at Citizens Bank Park in Philadelphia, Pennsylvania 55 °F (13 °C), clear
Team	1	2	3	4	5	6	7	8	9	R	H	E
Tampa Bay	0	0	0	1	1	0	0	0	0	2	5	2
Philadelphia	1	0	1	3	1	0	0	4	x	10	12	1
WP: Joe Blanton (1–0) LP: Andy Sonnanstine (0–1); Home runs: TB: Carl Crawford (2), Eric Hinske (1); PHI: Ryan Howard 2 (3), Joe Blanton (1), Jayson Werth (1); Attendance: 45,903; Boxscore

Robin Roberts threw out the Ceremonial First pitch while Patti LaBelle sang the national anthem. Philadelphia took a quick 1–0 lead in the bottom of the first inning, as Jimmy Rollins led off with a double and scored when Pat Burrell later walked with the bases loaded. The Phillies doubled their lead in the third when Chase Utley reached base on an error by Akinori Iwamura and scored on Pedro Feliz's RBI single. The Rays cut their deficit in half when Carl Crawford hit a solo home run in the top of the fourth inning, but Ryan Howard's three-run home run in the bottom half brought the score to 5–1. In the next inning, Eric Hinske hit a pinch-hit home run to bring the Rays within three runs, but Phillies starting pitcher Joe Blanton responded with a home run of his own to put his team back up by four. It was the first time a pitcher hit a home run in the World Series since Ken Holtzman in Game 4 of the 1974 World Series. In addition to hitting his first career home run, Blanton pitched six innings, striking out seven batters while giving up two runs on four hits to acquire his first win of the Series. In the eighth, Jayson Werth and Howard each hit a two-run home run to cap off the scoring at 10–2. Philadelphia's four relief pitchers combined for three shutout innings. Due to the late completion of the previous game, Games 3 and 4 each ended on the same calendar day.

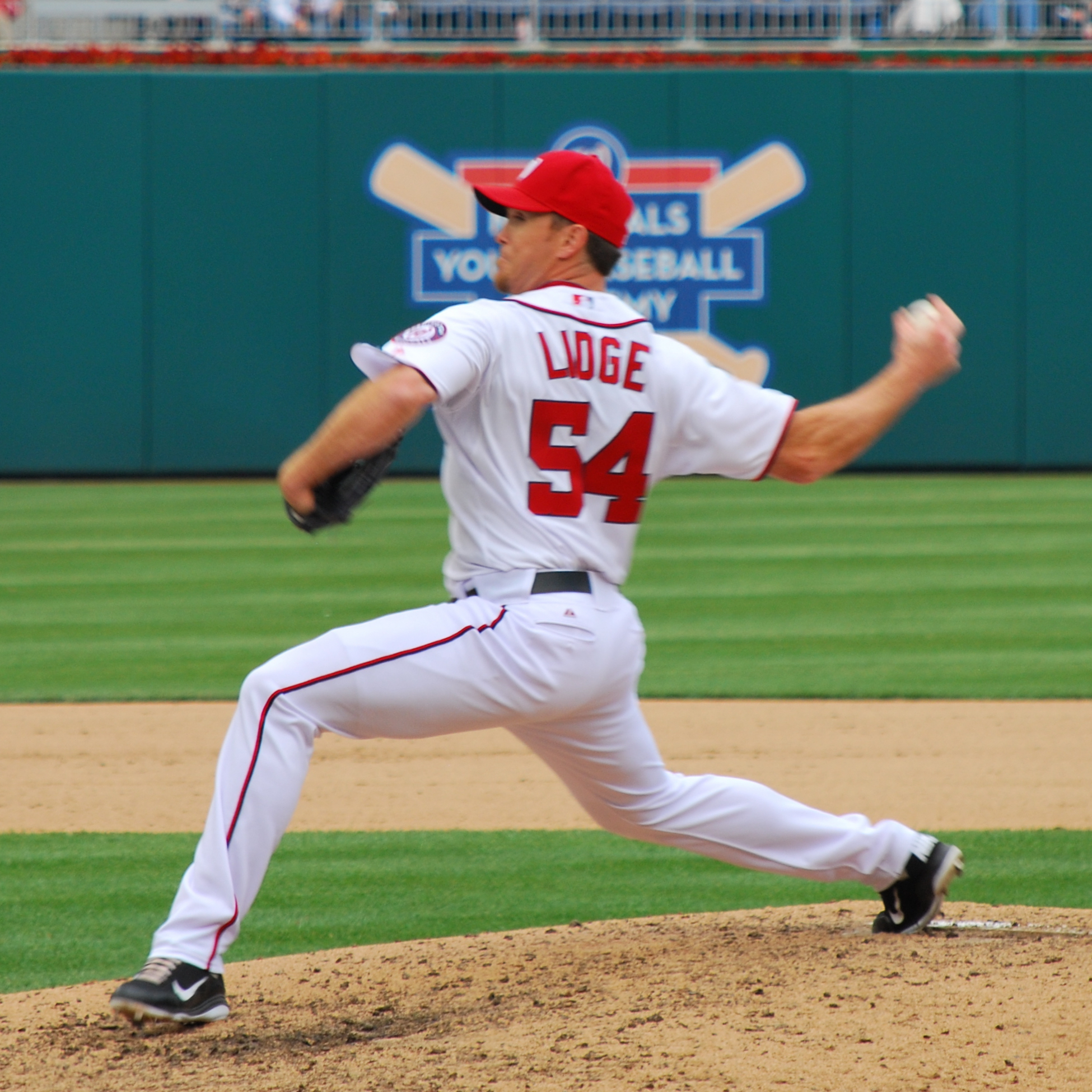
Brad Lidge saved his second game of the series to break a 28-year championship drought for the Phillies.

=== Game 5 ===
October 27, 2008 (started) and October 29, 2008 (completed) 8:29 pm (EDT) at Citizens Bank Park in Philadelphia, Pennsylvania 45 °F (7 °C), light rain/43 °F (6 °C), partly cloudy
Team	1	2	3	4	5	6	7	8	9	R	H	E
Tampa Bay	0	0	0	1	0	1	1	0	0	3	10	0
Philadelphia	2	0	0	0	0	1	1	0	x	4	8	1
WP: J. C. Romero (2–0) LP: J. P. Howell (0–2) Sv: Brad Lidge (2); Home runs: TB: Rocco Baldelli (1); PHI: None; Attendance: 45,940; Boxscore

The national anthem was sung by John Oates. Philadelphia scored in the first inning for the third consecutive game, taking a 2–0 lead when they loaded the bases with two outs off Rays starter Scott Kazmir, who then gave up a two-run single to Shane Victorino. Tampa Bay cut the lead in half in the fourth; Carlos Peña doubled with one out and scored on Evan Longoria's RBI single, both players' first hits of the Series. The Rays then tied the game in the sixth when B. J. Upton singled, stole second, and scored on Peña's RBI single.

The game was suspended after the top of the sixth because of rain, making it the first game in World Series history not to be played through to completion or declared a tie. Phillies starter Cole Hamels, making his fifth start, had pitched six innings when the umpires suspended play. The Phillies pinch-hit for Hamels in the bottom of the sixth inning. By retaking the lead in that half-inning, the Phillies put Hamels in line for the victory, which would have been his fifth win in the postseason, tying an MLB record. However, when Tampa Bay again tied the game in the seventh, Hamels was left with a no decision.

After the game was suspended, umpiring crew chief Tim Tschida told reporters that he and his crew ordered the players off the field because the wind and rain threatened to make the game "comical." Chase Utley agreed, saying that by the middle of the sixth, "the infield was basically under water." Rain continued to fall in Philadelphia on Tuesday, further postponing the game to Wednesday, October 29.

The game resumed with the Phillies batting in the bottom of the sixth inning. Pinch-hitter Geoff Jenkins led off with a double and scored on Jayson Werth's single to retake the lead for the Phillies, 3–2. In the top of the seventh, Rocco Baldelli re-tied the game at three runs with a one-out solo home run. Jason Bartlett then followed with a single and advanced to second on a sacrifice bunt by relief pitcher J. P. Howell. Bartlett then attempted to score the go-ahead run from second when Akinori Iwamura hit a ground ball to Utley, who faked a throw to first, then threw Bartlett out at home for the third out to keep the score tied. This play was later described as having saved the Series for the Phillies. Because Bartlett was on second instead of third before he got thrown out at home, Iwamura was credited with an infield single, instead of Utley being credited with a fielder's choice out. In the bottom of the seventh, Pat Burrell led off with a double off Howell for his only hit of the Series. Eric Bruntlett, pinch-running for Burrell, scored on a single by Pedro Feliz to put the Phillies up by a run again, 4–3. This gave Howell his second relief loss in the Series. In the top of the ninth, Brad Lidge gave up a one-out single to Dioner Navarro and a stolen base to pinch-runner Fernando Perez, but was able to retire Ben Zobrist and Eric Hinske to complete his perfect season of save opportunities and secure the World Series for the Phillies. Phillies reliever J. C. Romero got his second win of the Series.

Cole Hamels was named the World Series MVP after winning one of his two starts with eight strikeouts, four earned runs off 10 hits, and a 2.77 ERA in 13 total innings pitched.

==== Implications of the suspension ====
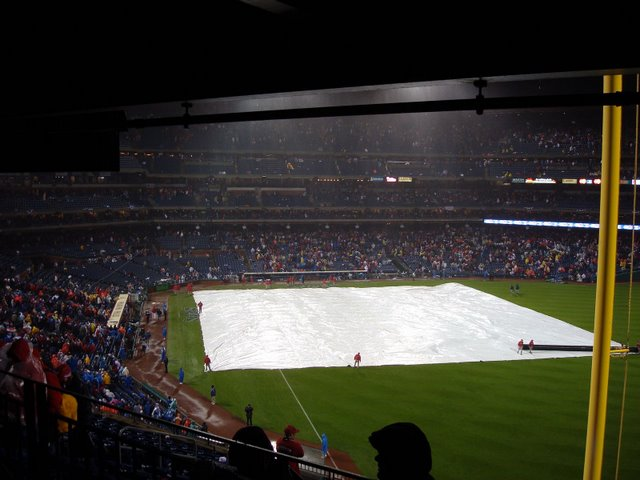
The grounds crew covers the field with a tarpaulin during the Game 5 rain delay.

Under normal conditions, games are considered to be official games after five innings, or four and a half if the home team is leading at that point. However, postseason games are operated by the Commissioner's Office, thus are subject to the Commissioner's discretion of how to handle the scheduling of the games. So, with rain in the forecast for Philadelphia, Commissioner Bud Selig informed both the Rays and the Phillies management before the game began that a team would not be allowed to clinch the Series in a rain-shortened game.

Because of the rainfall, Game 5 was suspended after the top of the sixth inning. Rain continued to fall in Philadelphia on Tuesday, October 28, and the game ultimately resumed on Wednesday, October 29, at Citizens Bank Park. Official MLB records and statistics for a suspended game reflect the start date of the contest; October 27 for this game.

This was the first game in World Series history to be suspended. There had been three tied games in the history of the World Series: 1907, 1912, and 1922, all of them called due to darkness. In general, no ties would be needed under modern rules, which provide for suspension of a tied game and resumption of it at the next possible date. Weather has caused numerous delays and postponements in Series history (notable postponements beforehand coming in 1911, 1962, 1975, 1986, 1996 and 2006), but never any suspended games before 2008. Although not officially a suspended game, the longest postponement for a World Series was during the 1989 edition in which the start of Game 3 was delayed 10 days, due to the Loma Prieta earthquake striking the San Francisco Bay Area.

Several Nevada sports betting agencies treated the suspended game as a completed game and a win for the Phillies on Monday, October 27. Under Nevada house rules, the final score of a baseball game is determined by reverting to the last completed full inning, and the Phillies led 2–1 at the end of the fifth inning. Game 5 side bets on Philadelphia were paid off while bets on totals and run-line bets were refunded.

During the following offseason, Selig's interpretation of the rules became codified, as the 30 MLB club owners approved a rule change stipulating that all "postseason games and games added to the regular season to determine qualifiers for the postseason" become suspended games if they are called before nine innings are played, regardless of whether the game would otherwise qualify as an official game, or the score at the time the game is called. The game is resumed when conditions permit at the same location from the point of suspension. The first usage of that policy occurred during Game 1 of the 2011 ALDS, which was suspended after two innings because of rain and was resumed the following day.

=== Composite line score ===
2008 World Series (4–1): Philadelphia Phillies (NL) beat Tampa Bay Rays (AL).

Team	1	2	3	4	5	6	7	8	9	R	H	E
Philadelphia Phillies	6	1	1	4	1	3	1	5	2	24	44	6
Tampa Bay Rays	2	2	0	4	2	1	3	1	0	15	33	5
Total attendance: 219,369 Average attendance: 43,874; Winning player's share: $351,504 Losing player's share: $223,390

== Weather conditions ==
Games 3 and 5 of the World Series were delayed by rain storms in Philadelphia, with the start of Game 3 on Saturday, October 25 being delayed an hour and 31 minutes (with that game ending at 1:47 am EDT on Sunday, October 26). Game 5, which began on Monday, October 27, was suspended after the top of the 6th inning and resumed Wednesday, October 29. Wet weather which affected Game 5 continued into Tuesday in the Philadelphia area, as Major League Baseball officials studied radar data to determine when Game 5 of the World Series would continue under conditions deemed "appropriate." Up to this point, there had never been a rain-shortened game in Series history, and this was the first suspension. As a result, had it been necessary to play them, Games 6 and 7 in St. Petersburg, originally scheduled for October 29 and 30, were postponed until a later date.

With temperatures plummeting towards 40 °F (4 °C) and with a cold rain falling at Citizens Bank Park, some of the Phillies and Rays players opted for an Elmer Fudd look, wearing specially made caps with built-in ear flaps. The caps, manufactured by New Era, were introduced during this year's spring training but were not used on the field until Game 5. New Era also supplied regular ball caps to both teams, which some players continued to wear despite the cold weather.

== Broadcasting ==
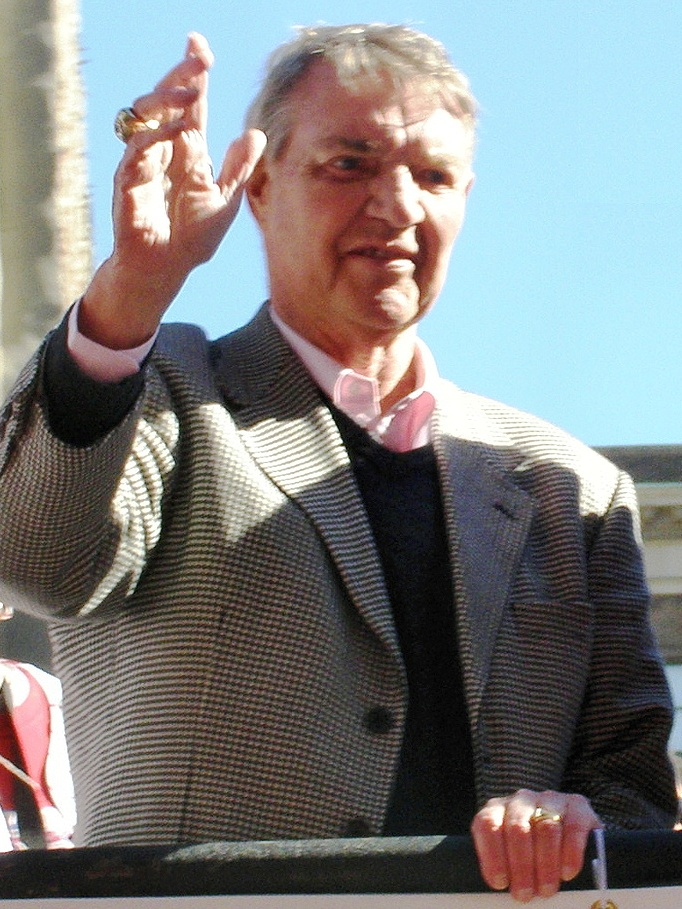
Harry Kalas, pictured at the World Series parade, called the series for Phillies radio and got to call a World Series win for the team, something he couldn't do in 1980.

The games were televised on Fox in the United States with Joe Buck and Tim McCarver (himself a former Phillies broadcaster) as booth announcers and Chris Myers and Ken Rosenthal as field reporters. Jeanne Zelasko hosted the pre-game and post-game show with Kevin Kennedy and Mark Grace (Games 1, 2) or Eric Karros (Games 3, 4, 5). Fox Sports en Español did the simulcast of the Series in Spanish-language with Ángel Torres, Miguel Morales and Cos Villa behind the microphones. Fox's broadcasts were also streamed online at MLB.com.

This was also the last World Series to air on analog television, as the Digital television transition in the United States required all full-power stations to convert to digital beginning on June 12, 2009.

On radio, the Series was broadcast nationally by ESPN Radio with Jon Miller and Joe Morgan announcing, and a Spanish broadcast on ESPN Deportes Radio. Locally, Dave Wills, Andy Freed, Dewayne Staats and Joe Magrane called the Series in English for the Rays on WHNZ-AM in Tampa, with Ricardo Tavaras and Enrique Oliu working the Spanish broadcast on St. Petersburg's WGES-AM. Harry Kalas, Scott Franzke, Larry Andersen, and Chris Wheeler called the Phillies' English broadcasts on WPHT-AM in Philadelphia, with Spanish announcers Danny Martinez, Bill Kulik and Juan Ramos on WUBA. Following their contractual obligations, the non-flagship stations on the teams' radio networks carried the ESPN Radio broadcasts. MLB.com also carried the local radio broadcasts for online streaming, while XM Satellite Radio aired the local and national feeds to its subscribers. For Harry Kalas, this series brought together a father and son calling the series for different teams; his son Todd worked as a pregame announcer for the Rays, and joined his father in the WPHT booth for an inning of Game 1.

For international viewers, MLB International televised the game with commentators Rick Sutcliffe and Dave O'Brien. This feed was also carried to U.S. service personnel stationed around the globe via the American Forces Network.

This World Series win had significance for McCarver and Harry Kalas. Both had been Phillies broadcasters in 1980, but neither had gotten to call that year's World Series. McCarver was a backup commentator for Game of the Week on NBC, but he was not part of the network's Series announcing team. For Kalas, MLB radio-broadcasting regulations forbade local stations from producing live coverage of World Series games, instead forcing them to air the national CBS Radio feed of the games. Philadelphia fans were so outraged about this afterward that they started a letter-writing campaign to the Commissioner's Office, demanding a change to the rule. The following year, MLB amended its broadcasting contracts to allow World Series teams' flagship radio stations to air the games with local announcers, due at least in part to this outcry from Philadelphia fans. In 2008, both called the Phillies' World Series win.

== Ratings ==
In both Nielsen ratings and total viewership, the 2008 edition of the Fall Classic set record lows for a televised World Series. 2008 bears the distinction of being the first World Series to draw an average rating lower than 10.0, with its 8.4 rating falling below the 10.1 record set two years earlier. The 6.1 rating of Game 3 also set a record, since surpassed, for the lowest rated individual game.

The low numbers were partially attributed to factors beyond MLB's control, including the length of the series and the market size of one of the participating teams. Game 3 was delayed for over 90 minutes due to weather and, consequently, ended at 1:47 AM EST. Game 5 was suspended after 5.5 innings and resumed two days later. However, ratings for the conclusion of the game were notably higher than the game's average and drew praise from Bud Selig.

In subsequent years, as part of a long-term trend of declining World Series ratings, several series surpassed 2008's ratings lows. The 2010 World Series also generated an 8.4 rating, and the 2012 World Series set a new record low of 7.6. Each World Series from 2018 through 2023 generated a lower rating than 2008, with the 2023 edition currently holding the distinction for having the lowest World Series rating.

Game	Ratings (households)	Share (households)	American audience (in millions)
1	9.2	15	14.63
2	8.1	13	12.78
3	6.1	13	9.84
4	9.3	15	15.48
5	9.6	14	15.79

== Umpiring ==
In Game 2, home plate umpire Kerwin Danley appealed a call to the first base umpire after calling strike three; the first base umpire called ball four to award the Rays' Rocco Baldelli a walk. Baldelli indicated that the calls did not come up in the locker room, and he did not believe they had an effect on the results.

In Game 3, Phillies' pitcher Jamie Moyer threw the ball to Ryan Howard to force out the Rays' Carl Crawford at first base, despite umpire Tom Hallion calling Crawford safe in the game. In Game 4, Evan Longoria tagged Rollins at third base, though umpire Tim Welke had ruled Rollins safe. The league admitted these errors between Games 4 and 5.

== Series overview and aftermath ==
The Phillies won the Series in five games despite committing at least one error in each game. This also marked only the second time in MLB history that first-inning runs were scored in each of the first five games played in a World Series (it had previously occurred in 2003).

=== Phillies ===
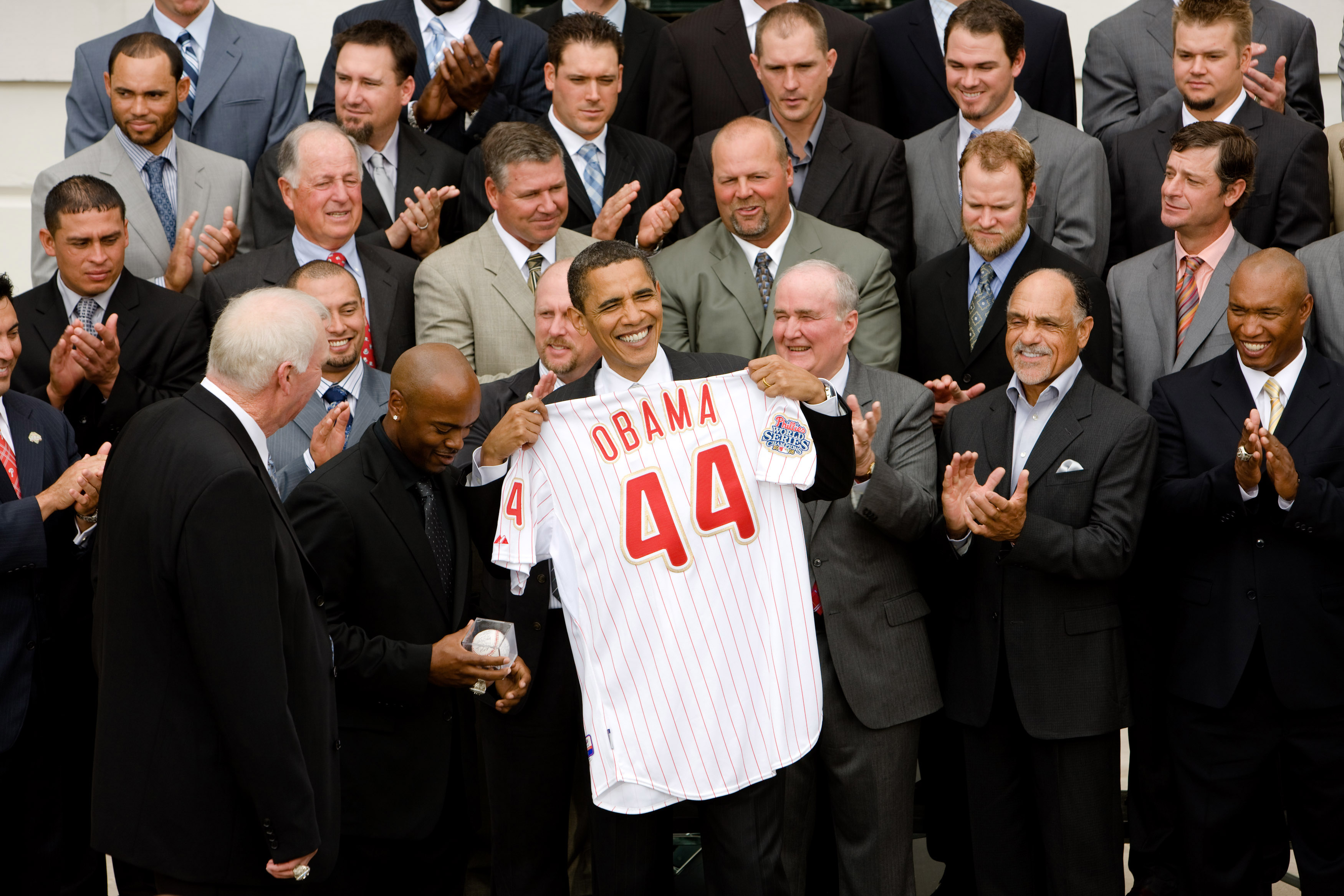
President Barack Obama meets with the 2008 World Series champion Philadelphia Phillies at the White House—May 15, 2009

The Phillies' second World Series championship (1980), brought the professional teams of Philadelphia its first major professional sports championship since the 76ers swept the 1983 NBA Finals, breaking the alleged Curse of Billy Penn.

Phillies President David Montgomery said that "our first name is Philadelphia", and he and manager Charlie Manuel dedicated the championship to the city of Philadelphia and the fans. Manuel also dedicated the championship to his mother, who died on the day of Game 2 of the NLCS. Phil Sheridan of The Philadelphia Inquirer said that the 25 years without a championship "helped define this city as a sports town for way too long. It was long enough to turn passion too often to anger. Maybe this championship will turn the vinegar back into wine," and said that the fans "waited forever and a day."

On Halloween, October 31, approximately two million fans lined Broad Street for a ticker-tape parade, making it the largest gathering for a championship parade in Philadelphia since the Flyers won the 1974 Stanley Cup Finals. This parade had significance for Phillies pitcher Jamie Moyer and Phillies broadcaster Harry Kalas, as they both were at the 1980 parade. Moyer grew up in the Philadelphia area as a Phillies fan and whose childhood hero was Steve Carlton, a member of the 1980 team, and whom he won against in his first Major League start. He was at both of the Phillies' World Series parades, skipping school to attend in 1980, and as a pitcher in 2008. Kalas was at both parades, as a broadcaster for the Phillies. When comparing the parade to the one in 1980, he told WCAU-TV that "this is bigger...the biggest I've ever seen."

In 2010, Philadelphia sports fans picked both of the Phillies' World Series wins as the two greatest moments in Philadelphia sports, picking the 2008 championship as the greatest moment.

The Phillies returned to the World Series in 2009, the first defending champion to return to the Series since the 2001 New York Yankees. During that season they finished first in the National League East with a 93–69 mark, and eliminated the Rockies and the Dodgers in the NL playoffs. They would lose to the Yankees in six games.

Subsequent regular season meetings between the Rays and the Phillies would be relatively uncommon. The Rays only visited Philadelphia twice within the next seven years (in 2012 and 2015).

This would be the last professional sports championship for the city of Philadelphia until the Philadelphia Eagles defeated the New England Patriots 41–33 in Super Bowl LII in 2018.

=== Rays ===
For the Rays, at the same time the ticker-tape parade went down Broad Street in Philadelphia, thousands of Rays' fans attended a rally at Straub Park in St. Petersburg, celebrating their 2008 season.

Mayor Rick Baker said that the rally "really needed to be done. There was so much demand in the community. They didn't win the World Series but they won the AL. And we want to celebrate that and thank them." He and Tampa Mayor Pam Iorio addressed the fans during the rally.

Though the Rays missed the playoffs in 2009, they earned a winning record of 84–78, placing them third behind the Red Sox and eventual champion Yankees. From 2010–2013, the Rays won at least 90 games each season, a remarkable feat for a team with one of the lowest payrolls in baseball. The 2008 Rays were covered in depth in the book The Extra 2%: How Wall Street Strategies Took a Major League Baseball Team from Worst to First by Jonah Keri.

The Rays returned to the World Series in 2020 and 2026, but lost to the Los Angeles Dodgers and Milwaukee Brewers, respectively.

Several Rays players from 2008 later won a World Series with other teams. Jonny Gomes, who was not on the Rays' postseason roster, played on the Boston Red Sox's 2013 championship team. David Price won a World Series ring in 2018 with the Red Sox, but opted out of playing during the Dodgers' 2020 championship run due to COVID-19 concerns. Edwin Jackson won a ring in 2011 with the St. Louis Cardinals, and Ben Zobrist won two World Series in 2015 and 2016 as a key member of the Kansas City Royals and Chicago Cubs (where he won World Series MVP) respectively. Rays manager Joe Maddon was also the manager of the 2016 Cubs, while the architect of the 2008 team, GM Andrew Friedman, would win three World Series as the Los Angeles Dodgers President of Baseball Operations (2020, 2024, 2025). Evan Longoria was a member of the 2023 Arizona Diamondbacks who lost that year's World Series to the Texas Rangers; Longoria's 15 year gap between World Series appearances is the longest for any position player in MLB history.

== See also ==
- 2008 Asia Series
- 2008 Japan Series
- 2008 Korean Series
- Curse of Billy Penn
