= List of Philadelphia Phillies broadcasters =

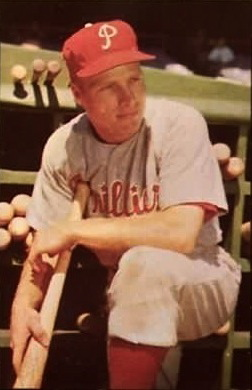
Richie Ashburn, Hall of Fame center fielder for the Phillies and color commentator 1963-1997

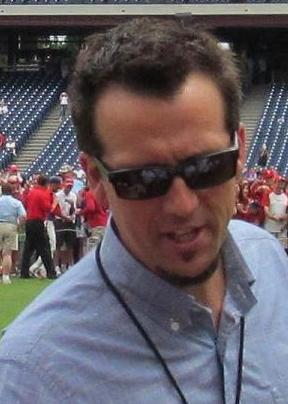
Scott Franzke, Phillies radio play-by-play announcer 2006-present

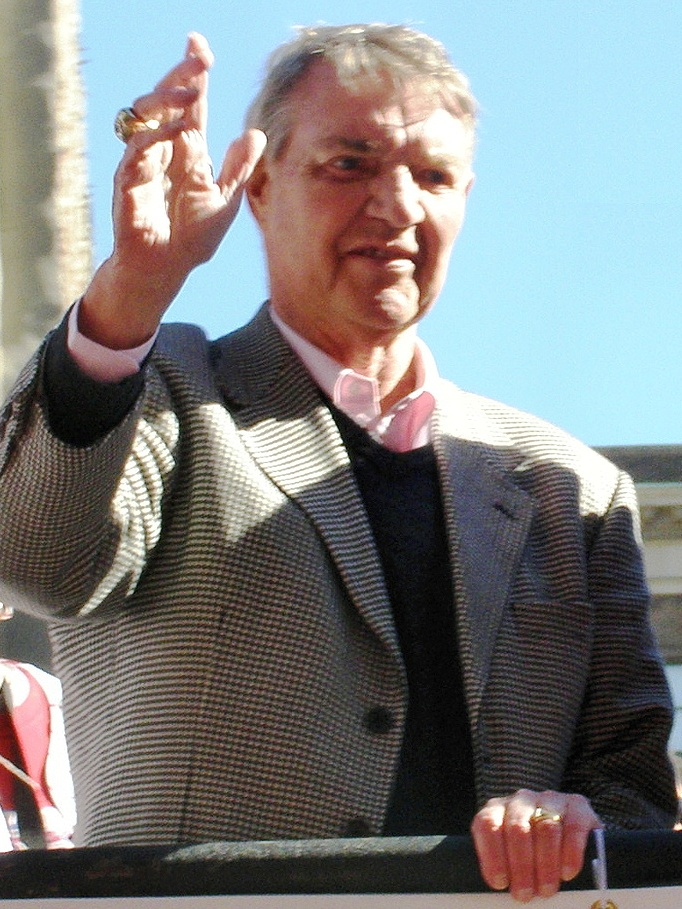
Harry Kalas, Phillies play-by-play announcer from 1971 to 2009

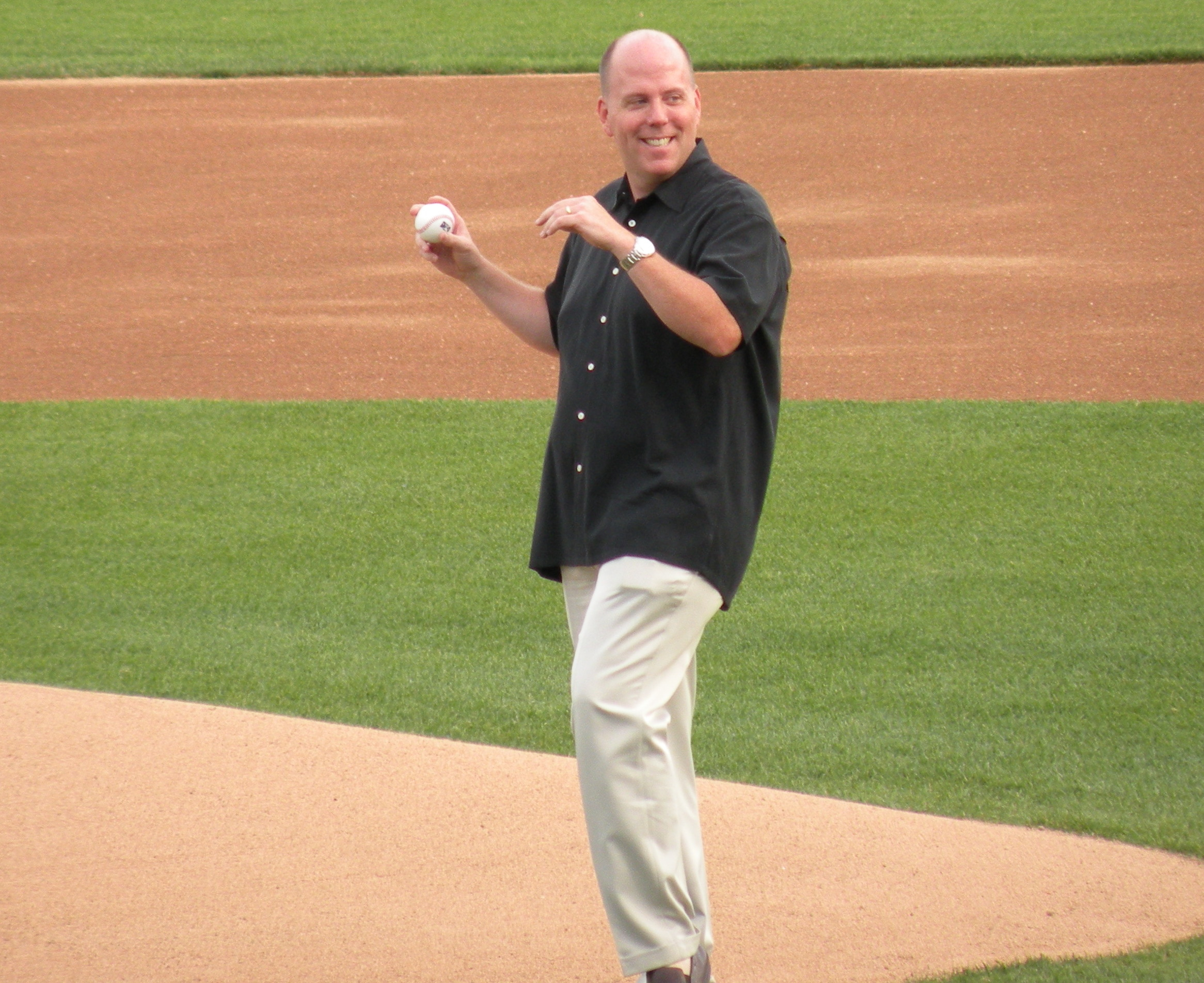
Tom McCarthy, Phillies play-by-play announcer 2004-2005 and 2009-present

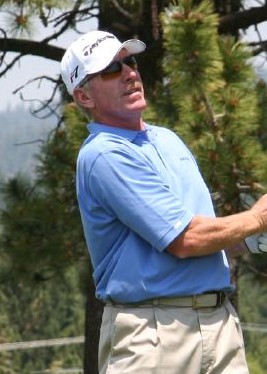
Mike Schmidt, Hall of Fame third baseman for the Phillies and color commentator in 1990 and 2014-2019, 2021-2025

The following is a list of Philadelphia Phillies broadcasters.

== Current broadcasters ==
=== Television ===
- Tom McCarthy, play-by-play announcer (since 2008)
- Scott Franzke, play-by-play announcer (fill-in play-by-play announcer when McCarthy is absent) (since 2022)
- John Kruk, color analyst (since 2017)
- Ben Davis, color analyst (since 2015)
- Rubén Amaro Jr., color analyst (since 2020)
- Cole Hamels, color analyst (since 2025)

=== Radio ===
- Scott Franzke, play-by-play announcer (since 2006)
- Tom McCarthy, play-by-play announcer (5th and 6th innings, playoff games only) (since 2022)
- Gregg Murphy, play-by-play announcer and pre/post-game host (fill-in play-by-play announcer when Franzke is absent) (since 2021)
- Larry Andersen, color analyst (since 1998)
- Kevin Stocker, color analyst (2018, 2022–present)

=== Spanish Radio ===
- Oscar Budejen, play-by-play announcer (since 2021)
- Bill Kulik, color analyst (since 2005)

== Broadcasting history ==
Name	Tenure	Ref
Rubén Amaro Jr.	2020–present	
Larry Andersen	1998–present	
Doug Arthur	1944–1945	
Richie Ashburn	1963–1997	
Jim Barniak	1990–1991	
Ricky Bottalico	2021	
Michael Bourn	2022	
Rob Brooks	2021	
Bill Brundige	1950–1951	
Bill Campbell	1963–1970	
Herb Carneal	1954	
Ben Davis	2015–present	
Chad Durbin	2022	
Bill Dyer	1936–1940	
Kevin Frandsen	2018–2021	
Scott Franzke	2006–present	
Scott Graham	1999–2006	
Taylor Grant	1942	
Roger Griswold	1937	
Cole Hamels	2025–present	
Claude Haring	1944–1946	
Claude Haring	1952	
Claude Haring	1955–1962	
Taryn Hatcher	2023–2025	
Jim Jackson	2010–2020	
Jay Johnstone	1992–1993	
Kevin Jordan	2018	
Harry Kalas	1971–2009	
Todd Kalas	1994–1996	
Gene Kelly	1950–1959	
Erik Kratz	2022	
John Kruk	2003	
John Kruk	2017–present	
Garry Maddox	1987–1989	
Garry Maddox	1991–1995	
Gary Matthews	2007–2013	
Patrick McCarthy	2021–2022	
Tom McCarthy	2004–2005	
Tom McCarthy	2008–present	
Tim McCarver	1980–1982	
Stoney McLinn	1939–1940	
Harry McTigue	1940	
Jamie Moyer	2014	
Gregg Murphy	2012–2020	
Gregg Murphy	2021–present	
Andy Musser	1976–2001	
Roy Neal	1943–1946	
Walt Newton	1938–1939	
Robin Roberts	1976	
Rickie Ricardo	2007-2014	
Jimmy Rollins	2019, 2021	
By Saam	1939–1949	
By Saam	1955–1975	
Mike Schmidt	1990	
Mike Schmidt	2014–2019, 2021–2025	
Frank Sims	1960–1962	
Matt Stairs	2014–2016	
Dolly Stark	1936	
Kevin Stocker	2018	
Kevin Stocker	2022–present	
Kent Tekulve	1992–1997	
Chuck Thompson	1947–1948	
George Walsh	1949	
George Walsh	1953–1954	
Chris Wheeler	1977–2013	

== See also ==
- Broadcasting of sports events
