= Gregg Murphy =

American sports journalist

- Born: 1971 (age 54–55); Meadowbrook, Pennsylvania, U.S.
- Education: St. Joseph's University
- Occupation: Sportscaster
- Children: 3

Gregg Murphy (born 1971) is an American sports broadcaster and reporter who currently serves as a member of the Philadelphia Phillies Radio Network broadcast team. He formerly worked for NBC Sports Philadelphia from 2008 to 2020, and was also part of CN8's sports coverage.

== Career ==
Murphy spent two years as co-host and reporter for The Inquirer High School Sports Show alongside Joe Briscella. Prior to coming to Philadelphia, Murphy was the weekend sports anchor and reporter for WFMZ-TV in Allentown, Pennsylvania.

Murphy then worked at CN8 where he hosted Out of Bounds, an hour-long sports program airing at 7 p.m. on weeknights that examined various sports stories across the nation, specifically those within CN8's viewing area from Maine to Virginia. He also served as a contributor to various other sports productions by CN8, including serving as the lead sports anchor for the 7 p.m. and 10 p.m. broadcasts of CN8 News each weeknight.

Murphy began appearing on Comcast SportsNet Philadelphia (now NBC Sports Philadelphia) in 2008, and he hosted his first edition of Daily News Live on December 30 of that year. Starting with the 2012 season, Murphy began serving as a member of the Philadelphia Phillies' broadcast team on the network, where he provided reports from various locations at Citizens Bank Park throughout the game. He also occasionally filled in for Tom McCarthy as the TV play-by-play announcer. In August 2020, NBC Sports Philadelphia announced that Murphy would not be returning as a field reporter for the Phillies after the 2020 season.

In April 2021, Murphy started a podcast with SBC Media Partners called Glove Stories with Murph. The podcast featured former Phillies players, former members of the Phillies organization, and Phillies analysts. In the 2021 season, Murphy joined the broadcast team for the Phillies Radio Network, where he currently serves a role as the host of pre- and postgame shows before and after all Phillies games. He also occasionally fills in for radio play-by-play announcer Scott Franzke.

== Personal life ==
Murphy was raised in Mount Laurel, New Jersey and attended Holy Cross Academy. He graduated from Saint Joseph's University in 1993. Gregg lives in Sewell, N.J., and has three children: one daughter, Quinn, and two sons, Matthew and Colin.
