= Kane Kalas =

American poker player, singer, and broadcaster (born 1989)

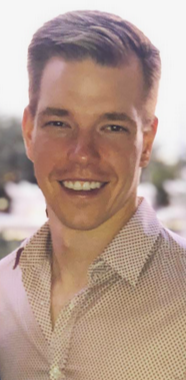
- Born: Kane Christopher Kalas; May 11, 1989 (age 37); Bryn Mawr, Pennsylvania, U.S.
- Education: University of Miami
- Occupations: Poker player, singer, broadcaster

Kane Kalas (born May 11, 1989) is an American poker player, recording artist, and broadcaster.

== Early life and education ==
Kane Kalas was born on May 11, 1989 in Bryn Mawr, Pennsylvania and was raised in Media, Pennsylvania. He is the son of the Philadelphia Phillies play-by-play commentator and Baseball Hall of Fame member Harry Kalas and brother of Todd Kalas, the play-by-play commentator for the Houston Astros. Kalas attended University of Miami.

== Career ==
=== Music ===
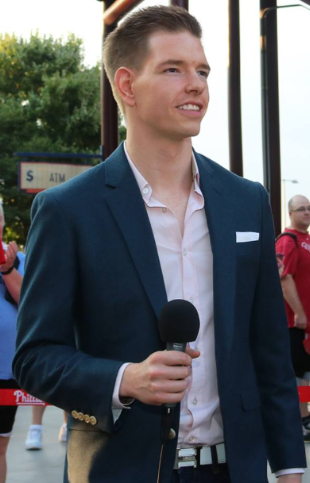
Kalas singing the national anthem

Kalas is known for performing "The Star-Spangled Banner", "God Bless America", and "Take Me Out to the Ball Game" at Citizens Bank Park. It is a Philadelphia Phillies tradition for Kalas to perform the national anthem at each year’s home opener and when the Phillies are in the playoffs.

In 2008, Kalas performed "America, the Dream Goes On" at Independence Hall in Philadelphia. In 2009, Kalas sang "America the Beautiful" at the Media Memorial Day parade. In 2022 he performed at the Media Eagles Pep Rally celebrating the Philadelphia Eagles Super Bowl appearance that year. He has performed in the professional operas Fidelio and Agostino and the Puchinni Clarinet.

In 2023, Kalas released an album titled High Hopes, dedicated to his father, Harry Kalas, and the city of Philadelphia. The cover album includes original compositions of 18 classic American Standards.

=== Poker ===
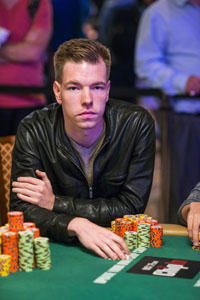
Kalas playing poker

Kalas starting playing online poker professionally under the handle "NASCAR_1949" during his freshman year of college in 2008. Between then and Poker Black Friday, Kalas competed in the largest cash games that have ever run online. He was a regular in Full Tilt Poker's Rail Heaven $500/$1000 No-limit Hold 'em games. During this time, Kalas made poker training videos for Pokernews Strategy, which later changed its name to Poker Phenoms.

Kalas' debut in televised poker occurred on the Fox Sports Network in September 2014, when he placed second in the WPT Borgata Poker Open for a total prize of over $500,000.

Kalas was featured in ESPN's coverage of the 2015 World Series of Poker Main Event.

Kalas is the winner of the biggest pot in televised poker history. In May 2018, he won a $2,178,770 pot in the Triton Cash Game from the Triton Super High Roller series held in Montenegro.

In 2019, Upswing Poker released a Six-plus hold'em training course featuring Kalas as the instructor.

== Broadcasting ==
Kalas is a regular broadcaster of the World Series of Poker for PokerGo, PokerCentral, and CBS All Access.

He has called play-by-play for a number of World Poker Tour events including PartyPoker's WPT Montreal, WPT Thunder Valley, WPT Deepstacks Parx, and WPT Borgata.

He called play-by-play for the first broadcast of the Triton Super High Roller Series in Montenegro in May 2018.

When the Patrick Antonius Poker Challenge tournament and cash game series debuted in 2019, in Tallinn, Estonia, Kalas commentated the event. Kalas also commentated the “High Stakes Feud” grudge match between Daniel Negreanu and Doug Polk in 2020.

Kalas has also broadcast events for the Seminole Hard Rock Poker Open, Live at the Bike, and the Borgata Poker Open.

== Discography ==
=== Studio albums ===
- High Hopes (2023)
