= Tom McCarthy (sportscaster) =

American sports broadcaster (born 1968)

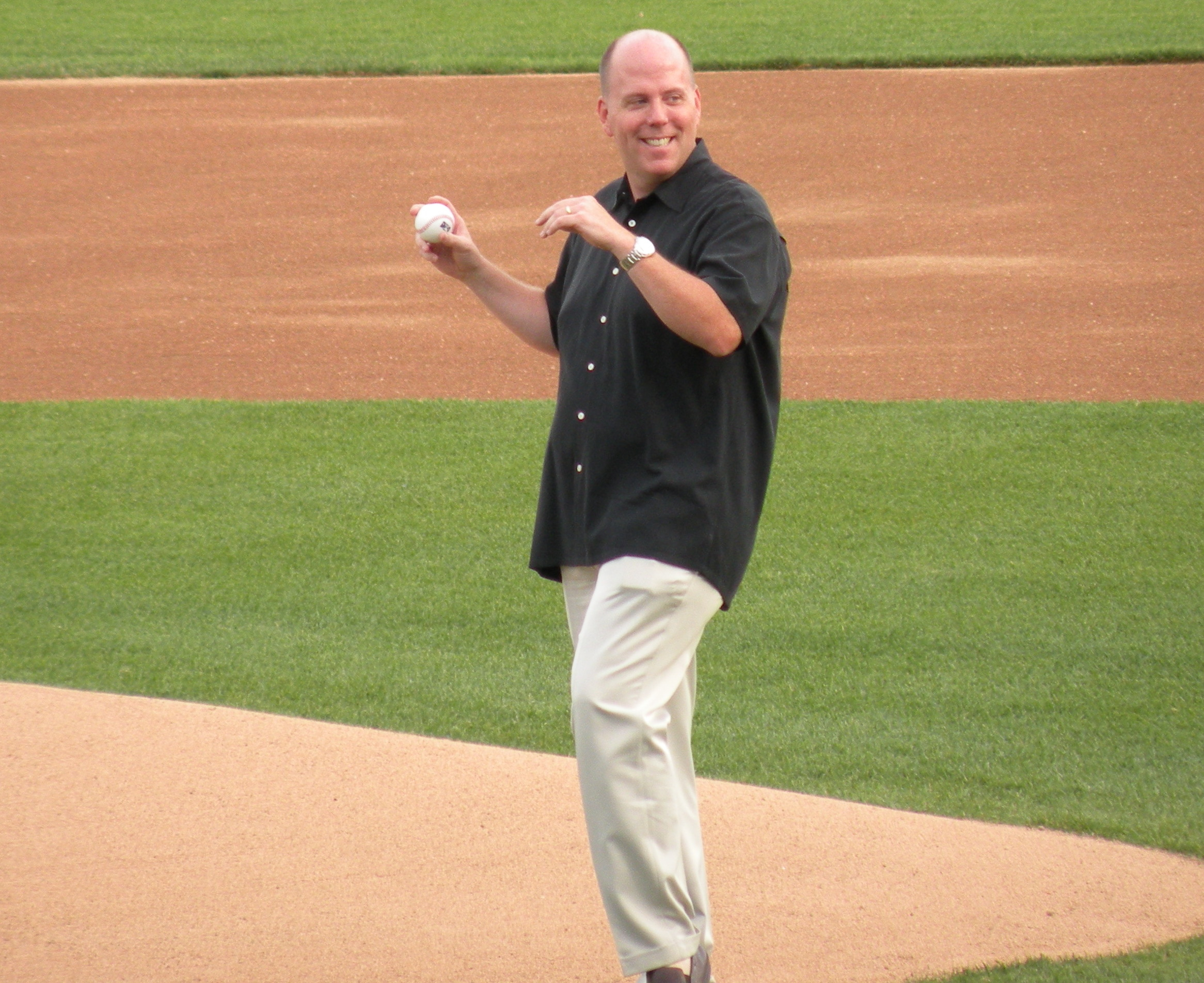
- McCarthy in 2009
- Born: July 5, 1968 (age 58); Jersey City, New Jersey, U.S.
- Education: The College of New Jersey
- Occupation: Sportscaster
- Children: 4 including Patrick

Tom McCarthy (born July 5, 1968), nicknamed "T-Mac", is an American sports broadcaster. He is the television play-by-play announcer for Philadelphia Phillies television broadcasts and also calls National Football League games on radio for Westwood One. He calls select NFL, NBA and college basketball games on CBS as well. McCarthy previously served as the play-by-play voice of Saint Joseph's University men's and women's basketball teams.

Tom McCarthy filled in for select weeks of the 2025 regular season for the MLB on TBS.

== Broadcast career ==
McCarthy spent five seasons with the Philadelphia Phillies (2001–05) as a radio play-by-play voice and as their pre-game and post-game radio host. Previously, he served as the play-by-play announcer for the Double-A Trenton Thunder for six seasons (1994–99). He has also been a play-by-play voice for Rutgers University football and for national football and basketball broadcasts on the CBS Sports Network (formerly known as CSTV), the Atlantic 10 TV network, Westwood One, and the Sports USA Radio Network.

After two seasons (2006–07), as a play-by-play announcer for the National League East rival New York Mets on WFAN, McCarthy signed a five-year deal to return to Philadelphia beginning with the 2008 season. Following the death of Harry Kalas early in the 2009 season, McCarthy took over television play-by-play on a full-time basis. McCarthy is one of three broadcasters to have covered both the Mets and Phillies on a regular basis (the others being Tim McCarver and Todd Kalas).

McCarthy spent nearly a decade broadcasting Princeton University football and men's basketball. He was the play-by-play voice for the Tigers during their 43–41 upset win over defending NCAA champion UCLA in the 1996 NCAA tournament and during their 27–2 run through the 1997–98 season. In 2009, McCarthy did play-by-play of the 2009 Caribbean Series for the MLB Network from their studios in Secaucus, New Jersey with Boston Red Sox Spanish language radio announcer Uri Berenguer on the color commentary.

McCarthy has called a game for Fox NFL Sunday as well as MLB games on Fox, most of them involving the Phillies. He is a broadcaster for the NFL on CBS. His current partner is Ross Tucker. McCarthy is one of the current broadcasters who cover both NFL and MLB. In 2020, he called his first prime-time NFL game in a Tuesday night matchup between the Buffalo Bills and the Tennessee Titans. McCarthy serves as the play-by-play announcer for Cleveland Browns preseason games alongside color commentator, Joe Thomas.

On January 9, 2022, McCarthy filled in for CBS' lead NFL play–by–play announcer Jim Nantz for a game featuring the Carolina Panthers and Tampa Bay Buccaneers. Nantz had to sit out that week's broadcast alongside color commentator Tony Romo due to COVID protocols.

== Personal life ==
McCarthy graduated from Brick Memorial High School in Brick, New Jersey in 1986 and is a 1990 graduate of Trenton State College (now The College of New Jersey). At Trenton State, he was a brother of the Phi Gamma Chi chapter of Alpha Chi Rho. He currently lives with his wife Meg in Allentown, New Jersey. His son Pat is also an announcer for the New York Mets.
