= Scott Franzke =

American sportscaster (born 1972)

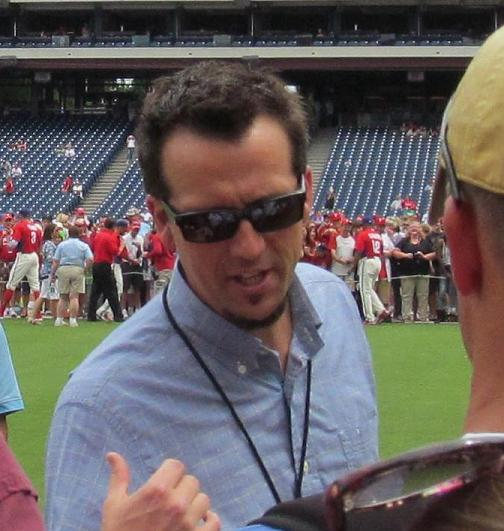
- Franzke in 2012
- Born: March 6, 1972 (age 54); Dallas, Texas, U.S.
- Education: Southern Methodist University (BA)
- Years active: 1997–present
- Spouse: Lori
- Children: 3
- Sports commentary career
- Teams: Philadelphia Phillies (2006–Present); Texas Rangers (2002–05); Kane County Cougars (1999–2001); Texas Rangers (1997–98)
- Genres: Play-by-play, Pre- and Post-Game Host
- Sport: Major League Baseball
- Website: Phillies Broadcasters

Scott Franzke (born March 6, 1972) is an American sportscaster and radio play-by-play announcer for the Philadelphia Phillies.

== Early life and education ==
Franzke was born in Dallas on March 6, 1972. In 1994, he graduated from Southern Methodist University in University Park, Texas with a degree in broadcast journalism.

== Career ==
=== Texas Rangers ===
Franzke's career began as a studio host for the now-defunct Prime Sports Radio Network (now Fox Sports Radio) in 1994 which led him three years later to be the host of the Texas Rangers radio pre- and post-game shows 1997–98. He honed his play-by-play skills as the voice of the Kane County Cougars from 1999 to 2001, and covered the 2000 Summer Olympics for Sporting News Radio. He returned to the Rangers to reassume the pre and post game broadcasting duties and also filled in on play-by-play from 2002 to 2005.

=== Philadelphia Phillies ===
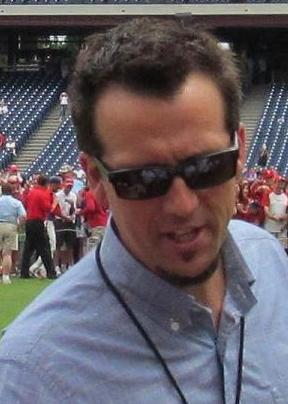
Franzke at Citizens Bank Park in Philadelphia in July 2012

In 2006, he was hired by the Philadelphia Phillies to take over those same duties when Tom McCarthy was hired away from the Phillies by the New York Mets, their National League Eastern Division rivals. McCarthy returned to the Phillies broadcasting team in 2008. Franzke worked the fifth and sixth innings in 2006 with Larry Andersen.

In 2007, Franzke assumed more play-by-play duties, replacing Scott Graham in the broadcast booth, turning over pre- and post-game duties to Jim Jackson.

In 2008 and the first month of the 2009 season, Franzke called play-by-play in innings 1–3 and 5–9 with Andersen, while Harry Kalas joined Andersen for play-by-play in the fourth. After the death of Kalas, Franzke assumed play-by-play duties for all nine innings for the remainder of the 2009 season. Until 2020, Franzke called innings 1–3 and 6–9 during home games (with Jackson taking over for innings 4–5) while continuing to call all nine during away games and home games when Jackson was unavailable due to his work as the television play-by-play voice of the Philadelphia Flyers. Beginning in 2021, Franzke once again called all nine innings for every game.

On February 13, 2023, the Phillies announced they reached a long-term deal with Franzke after the expiration of his contract at the end of the 2022 season.

==== Memorable Philadelphia Phillies calls ====
- 2008:
  And the 3-1 pitch, swing and a high fly ball [ Andersen: “Oh yes!”], deep right field! Ethier turns and he watches this one sail deep into the pavilion seats in right! Phillies lead in the 8th on a pinch-hit, two-run home run from Matt Stairs!
  — Matt Stairs's go-ahead home run in Game 4 of the 2008 National League Championship Series against the Los Angeles Dodgers
- 2009:
  Runners go, the pitch, swung on, lined to second, Bruntlett's got it, steps on second, tags the runner! It's a triple play! And that will end the ball game! Are you kidding me!?
  — Eric Bruntlett turns an unassisted triple play in the ninth inning against the New York Mets, August 23, 2009

Street, a high set. Two balls and a strike, here's the pitch. Howard swings and drives one! Deep right field. On the run, Gonzalez, towards the track, it's over his head. One hops the wall. Victorino coming around third, he's going to score! Utley's right on his heels, and he is safe! A double by Howard has tied the game here in the top of the ninth with two outs! 4–4 in the ninth! Ryan Howard has come through and stunned this crowd in Colorado!

— Ryan Howard's double in Game 4 of the 2009 National League Division Series against the Colorado Rockies

The right-hander (Jonathan Broxton) checks the runner. Here's the pitch. Swing and a drive, right center field. This one is falling! It's a base hit! It'll go up the alley! Bruntlett will score! Ruiz around third, he is being waved home—the Phillies have won the ballgame! Ruiz slides! Rollins has won it! They stream out of the dugout, Rollins mobbed near third! This game is over, as the Phillies strike again with two outs in the ninth inning, and they have a three games to one lead! The Phillies have beaten the Dodgers with two outs in the ninth, and they have done it to Broxton again in Game 4! Wow, what a finish! Jimmy Rollins has made his mark in this series!

— Jimmy Rollins's game-winning double in Game 4 of the 2009 National League Championship Series against the Los Angeles Dodgers

- 2010:
  Halladay takes the baseball back. Steps back up onto the mound, tucks the baseball in his right hand, now into the glove, holds it in front of the letters, nods yes, the wind... the 1-2 pitch, swing and a ground ball left side, Castro's got it, spins, throws, he got him! A perfect game for Roy Halladay! Twenty-seven up and twenty-seven down! Halladay is mobbed at the mound as the Phillies celebrate perfection tonight in Miami!
  — Roy Halladay's perfect game on May 29, 2010 against the Florida Marlins

Just about a quarter to eight, October the sixth, 2010. The first postseason game for Roy Halladay. He winds, the 0-2, swing and a dribbler, out in front of the plate, Ruiz out to get it, the throw from his knees — It's in time! And it's a no-hitter! Unbelievable! Ruiz and Halladay embrace and the Phillies again celebrate around Roy Halladay! Four nothing, it's the second no-hitter in major league postseason history, here tonight at Citizens Bank Park!

— Roy Halladay's postseason no-hitter on October 6, 2010, in Game 2 of the 2010 National League Division Series against the Cincinnati Reds.

- 2022:

Here's the 3-2, Swung on! Crushed! He's done it! How about that for heroics into the second deck as Bryce Harper has tied this game! On a 3-2 pitch in the bottom of the 8th inning, it's 6 to 6 on Harper's sixth career grand slam!

— Bryce Harper's game tying Grand Slam against the Los Angeles Angels on June 5, 2022.

Jean Segura, one foot still in the box. Takes a deep breath, looks out at Pallante. He's got the count even now, two balls, two strikes. Outfield pretty shallow, all the way around. The right hander comes set; he kicks, and the 2-2 ... swing and a ground ball, right side -- it's under the glove of Edman! It’s into right, the game is tied! Here comes Castellanos! He'll score! And the Phillies lead it in the ninth! . . . . Jean Segura has come through and the Phillies have sc-- scored three times to take the lead on the Cardinals!

— Jean Segura's go-ahead hit in Game 1 of the 2022 National League Wild Card Series against the St. Louis Cardinals

Two on one out, and the pitch. Swung on! Crushed, and the Phillies are gonna lead it! Four to nothing! A three-run home run for Rhys Hoskins! His first postseason home run, and he's sprinting around third-base! What a moment here at Citizens Bank Park!

— Rhys Hoskins's three-run home run in Game 3 of the 2022 National League Division Series against the Atlanta Braves

Two balls, two strikes to Bryce Harper. Suárez delivers. Swing and a drive; left field. It's deep! It's going!! And it is gone!! It is bedlam at the Bank as Bryce Harper has put the Phillies on top!! . . . . His tenth career home run in the postseason and he may never hit a bigger one!

— Bryce Harper's two-run home run in Game 5 of the 2022 National League Championship Series against the San Diego Padres

Here in the top of the ninth inning. Hoskins well off the line at first-base, Segura step up the middle at second. Suarez kicks and here's the pitch. Breaking ball popped up! Shallow right, Segura going out Castellanos coming on. Castellanos has it, and the Phillies have the National League Championship! They have beaten the Padres four to three and they celebrate on their home turf! As the Phillies are the 2022 NL Champs!

— Final pitch from Ranger Suarez during Game 5 of the 2022 National League Championship Series against the San Diego Padres

- 2023:

The right hander's pitch. Swung on, belted! Deep right field and it's long gone for Harper! A second deck three-run home run for Bryce Harper! As he punishes that pitch, from Bryce Elder. As the Phillies take a four to one lead!

— Bryce Harper's three-run home run in Game 3 of the 2023 National League Division Series against the Atlanta Braves

Strahm is ready, and the left hander's one-two. Swing and a miss he got him! Phillies come racing out of the dugout as Matt Strahm as saved it and the Phillies have beaten the Braves in the division series for the second year in a row! The Phillies will return to the National League Championship Series!

— Final pitch from Matt Strahm during Game 4 of the 2023 National League Division Series against the Atlanta Braves

- 2024:
  Two balls, two strikes, and the pitch. Swung on hit in the air deep right-center field on the run Castellanos he is there and he's got it! And the Phillies close out the National League East they are the Champions of 2024! They come running out of the dugout and meet at the mound around Carlos Estevez! As for the twelfth time in team history, the Phillies have won the National League East, and they've done it for the first time in thirteen years!
  — Final pitch from Carlos Estevez to win the 2024 National League East Division Championship against the Chicago Cubs
- 2026:
  The stretch by the lefty and the pitch. Harper swings! It's one high and deep! And the game is tied. Harper and Schwarber go back to back when the Phillies needed the most. 3-3 and we start over in the 8th. Table for two at the Chop House please!
  — Bryce Harper's home run in Game 2 of the 2026 Wild Card Series against the Atlanta Braves

== Personal life ==
Franzke and his wife, Lori, have three children.
