= Harry Kalas =

American sports commentator (1936–2009)

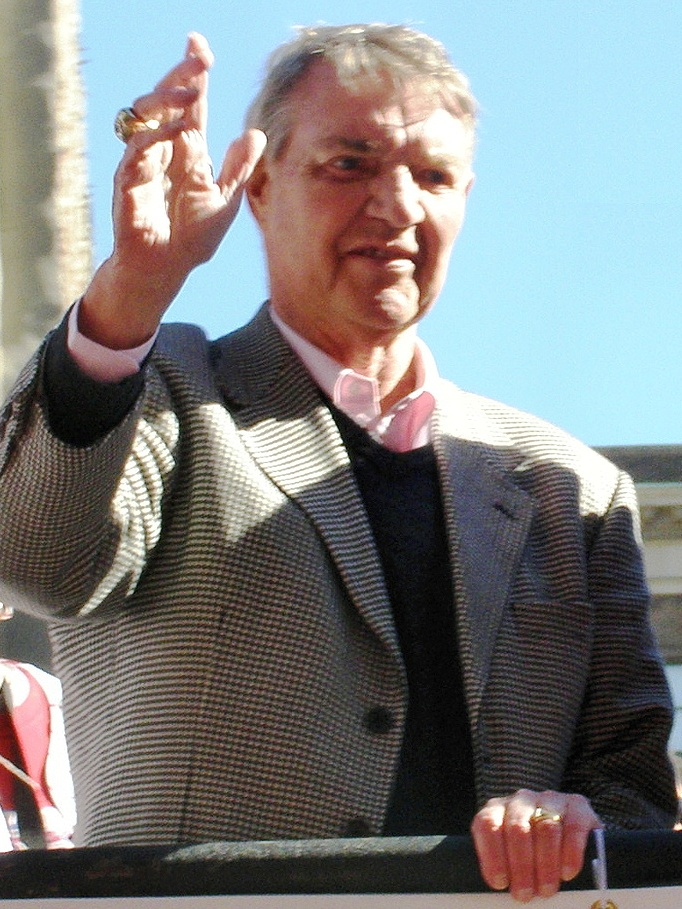
- Kalas at the Phillies World Championship Parade
- Born: Harry Norbert Kalas; March 26, 1936; Naperville, Illinois, U.S.
- Died: April 13, 2009 (aged 73); Washington, D.C., U.S.
- Resting place: Laurel Hill Cemetery
- Years active: 1962–2009
- Television: Inside The NFL
- Children: Brad; Kane; Todd
- Awards: Ford C. Frick Award; Philadelphia Sports Writers Association, Living Legend; Philadelphia Sports Hall of Fame, Legacy of Excellence; Philadelphia Phillies Wall of Fame; Radio Hall of Fame
- Sports commentary career
- Teams: Houston Astros, Philadelphia Phillies, NFL Films, Westwood One NFL Sunday Afternoon Doubleheaders, Hawaii Islanders
- Genres: Play-by-play, Sports commentator
- Sports: Baseball, Football

Harold Norbert Kalas (March 26, 1936 – April 13, 2009) was an American sportscaster, best known for his Ford C. Frick Award-winning role as lead play-by-play announcer for the Philadelphia Phillies of Major League Baseball (MLB), a position he held from 1971 until his death in 2009.

Kalas was also closely identified with the National Football League (NFL), serving as a voice-over narrator for NFL Films productions (a regular feature on Inside the NFL) and calling football games nationally for Westwood One radio.

== Early life and education ==
Kalas was born on March 26, 1936; the son of a Methodist minister of German descent, Kalas graduated from Naperville High School in 1954 and from the University of Iowa in 1959. At the University of Iowa, he was a member of Phi Delta Theta fraternity.

== Career ==
After graduating from the University of Iowa, Kalas was immediately drafted into the United States Army and stationed in Hawaii.

After his discharge in 1961, Kalas began calling Minor League baseball games for the Hawaii Islanders.

=== Houston Astros ===
In 1965, Kalas made his Major League Baseball broadcasting debut with the Houston Astros, replacing Al Helfer and working alongside Gene Elston and Loel Passe. He called the first game at the Houston Astrodome, on April 12, 1965.

=== Philadelphia Phillies ===
In 1971, Kalas was hired by the Phillies to succeed Bill Campbell, and was the master of ceremonies at the 1971 opening of Veterans Stadium. After the retirement of By Saam, Kalas was paired with Andy Musser and Hall of Fame player Richie Ashburn.

Kalas initially received a reception from fans, as he had replaced the popular Bill Campbell. He soon won over Phillies supporters with his manner, his voice — which had a distinctive leathery quality and rose to excitement on significant plays and Phillies home runs, particularly in key situations — as well as his evident love of the game and his accessibility to fans, for whom he expressed genuine affection.

During his Phillies career, he called six no-hit games, six National League Championship Series, and three World Series (1983, 1993, and 2008). However, due to MLB rules at the time, he could not call the 1980 World Series, as local broadcasters were not allowed to call games due to contract conflicts with MLB, NBC and CBS Radio. Public outcry caused MLB to change its policies the following year.

Kalas also called the first game at Veterans Stadium (April 10, 1971), the last game at Veterans Stadium (September 28, 2003), and the first game at Citizens Bank Park (April 12, 2004).

Kalas was sidelined for a few days in late July 2008 to treat a detached retina.

On April 8, 2009, the Phillies honored Kalas by having him throw out the first pitch before a game against the Atlanta Braves. Kalas's pitch was part of the pre-game ceremony in which the Phillies received their 2008 World Series championship rings. The ceremony would be part of Kalas's last home game.

On May 15, 2009, during a series in Washington, the Phillies visited the White House and were congratulated by President Barack Obama for their 2008 World Series championship. The visit had been postponed from April 14, due to Kalas's death the preceding day. The President mentioned Kalas, his voice, his love for the Phillies, and his legacy. This was the second of two tributes to Kalas in Washington. On April 21, eight days after Kalas's death, then–U.S. Congressman Joe Sestak paid tribute to Kalas in the House of Representatives. At the time, Sestak represented Pennsylvania's 7th congressional district, where Kalas resided.

==== Richie Ashburn ====
Kalas and Ashburn became beloved figures in Philadelphia, and also became best friends. They worked together for 27 seasons until Ashburn's death on September 9, 1997, of a heart attack in his sleep in a room at the Grand Hyatt New York after broadcasting a Phillies/Mets game at Shea Stadium. It is believed by many that Kalas never got over the death of his partner and friend, openly stating more than 11 years afterward that he still grieved over Ashburn's death.

==== Memorable calls ====
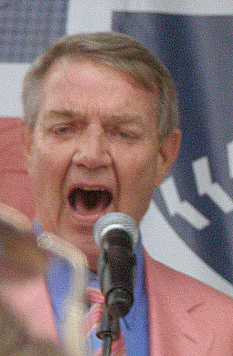
Kalas, pictured before the 2007 playoffs, singing "High Hopes"

Kalas' familiar home run call was "Swing ... and a long drive, this ball is ... outta here! Home run Ryan Howard!" If it was a gigantic home run, he sometimes inserted "deep (left center)" after "and a long drive" and described it as "that ball's way outta here!"

As a guest on ESPN's Sunday Night Baseball on July 15, 2007, Kalas recounted that his famous "outta here" call originated in the mid-1970s. While standing around the batting cage during batting practice, he saw Phillies slugger Greg Luzinski hit a ball into the upper deck, to which Philly shortstop Larry Bowa reacted with the words, "Wow! That's way outta here." Kalas said that it had a nice "unique ring to it and has been using it ever since".

Other broadcasters have used Kalas' "outta here" call, including Gary Cohen of the New York Mets, Jerry Coleman of the San Diego Padres, Duane Kuiper of the San Francisco Giants and Terry Smith of the Los Angeles Angels of Anaheim.

Kalas made, arguably, his most memorable call on April 18, 1987, when Mike Schmidt hit his 500th career home run.

Swing and a long drive, there it is, number 500! The career 500th home run for Michael Jack Schmidt!

In 1980, after the Phillies won the World Series, Kalas and the rest of the Phillies' radio crew re-created the call that Kalas probably would have made when Tug McGraw struck out Willie Wilson to win Game 6 and the World Series between the Phillies and the Kansas City Royals.

65,000 plus on their feet here at Veterans Stadium. The Tugger needs one more ... Swing and a miss! Yes, he struck him out! Yes, they did it! The Phillies are world champions! World champions of baseball! It's pandemonium at Veterans Stadium! All of the fans are on their feet. This city has come together behind a baseball team! ... Phillies are world champions! This city knows it! This city loves it!

This call was not made live by Kalas, but was re-created in a studio after the fact for the Phillies' season highlights album. MLB radio-broadcasting regulations at the time forbade local stations from producing live coverage of World Series games, instead forcing them to carry the national CBS Radio feed of the games. Philadelphia fans were so outraged about this afterward that they started a letter-writing campaign to the Commissioner's Office, demanding a change to the rule. Due at least in part to this outcry from Philadelphia fans, MLB amended its broadcasting contracts the following year to allow World Series teams' flagship radio stations to air the games with local announcers. Nevertheless, Kalas was part of the Phillies' World Series celebration in 1980, and rode in the team's victory parade down Broad Street.

Kalas did call the 1980 NLCS, but his call of the final out was partially drowned out by Tim McCarver's laughter. An exciting call from an otherwise forgettable season occurred in May 1989, when, on a Phillies team that would finish last, Bob Dernier hit a walk-off, 3-run inside-the-park home run against the eventual National League Champion Giants:

Swing and a line drive, it's a fair ball down the left field line, going on the way to the corner. Here comes Thon in to score; Lake being waved around! Mitchell can't pick it up! Lake scores -- here comes Dernier!! The throw to the plate -- safe!! I can't believe it!! The Phillies have won 3 to 2 in the bottom half of the 12th inning!! Incredible! Mitchell could not pick the ball up down in the left field corner! It kicked away from him! Dernier circled the bases! The Phillies have won 3 to 2 in the 12th! Would you believe it!?

Kalas called a grand slam home run by Mariano Duncan off Lee Smith in 1993:

Well hit.. WELL HIT...It might be, it could be... Grandslam! A Grandslam home run Mariano Duncan! Can you believe it?

Another memorable call by Kalas was his description of Mitch Williams's strikeout of Bill Pecota for the final out of Game 6 of the 1993 National League Championship Series between the Phillies and Atlanta Braves:

Swing and a miss! Struck him out! The Phillies are the '93 National League Champions!!!

Another of Kalas' famous calls came less than two weeks later with Joe Carter's famous walk-off home run to end the World Series, though the Phillies lost the series:

The 2–2 pitch, line drive in deep left, this ball is outta here. Three-run home run, Joe Carter, and the Toronto Blue Jays are the world champions of baseball for the second straight year. A three-run home run in the bottom of the ninth by Joe Carter who's being mobbed at home plate.

On April 4, 2003, Kalas called a grand slam by Chase Utley in Utley's major-league debut:

Long drive...could it be...it is...OUTTA HERE! Grand slam home run — welcome to "The Show," Mr. Utley!

On June 14, 2004, Kalas called the 400th home run hit by Jim Thome, using the call he used in later years when it was uncertain whether the ball would clear the fence:

Could it be...could it be...it...is...OUTTA HERE! Number 400 for Jim Thome!

On September 7, 2005, Kalas calls an eventual game-winning 3-run home run by Craig Biggio in top of the 9th off Billy Wagner.

Oh no. You got to be kidding me. You've got to be kidding me. A three-run home run Craig Biggio. All the runs are unearned, but who cares.

On August 9, 2006, Kalas called a close play at the plate as Chase Utley scored from second base on a routine groundout against the Atlanta Braves:

Chase is going to keep going and he's safe at home plate! Chase Utley, you...ARE...the...man!

Here is Kalas's call of Brett Myers' strikeout of Washington's Wily Mo Pena to clinch the 2007 National League East division title for the Phillies on the last day of the season, completing a comeback as they erased a seven-game deficit behind the New York Mets in early September:

Myers ... has the sign from Chris Coste ... curveball, struck him out! The Phillies are National League East champions! Look at the scene on the field! Look at the scene on the stands! This is incredible! The Phillies are the National League East champions and will go to the postseason for the first time since 1993! Wow!

Kalas' call on the Phillies' victory in Game 5 of the 2008 NLCS:

The 3–2 pitch ... Swing, and a pop-up, this game is gonna be over ... Carlos Ruiz squeezes it, and the Phillies are the National League champions! The Phils move on to the World Series!

On October 29, 2008, Kalas was finally able to call a Phillies' championship-winning moment in the World Series when Brad Lidge struck out Eric Hinske to win the 104th Fall Classic:

One strike away; nothing-and-two, the count to Hinske. Fans on their feet; rally towels are being waved. Brad Lidge stretches. The 0–2 pitch — swing and a miss, struck him out! The Philadelphia Phillies are 2008 World Champions of baseball! Brad Lidge does it again, and stays perfect for the 2008 season! 48-for-48 in save opportunities, and let the city celebrate! Don't let the 48-hour wait diminish the euphoria of this moment, and the celebration. And it has been 28 years since the Phillies have enjoyed a World Championship; 25 years in this city that a team that has enjoyed a World Championship, and the fans are ready to celebrate. What a night!

Kalas made his final call on April 12, 2009, during the Phillies game against the Colorado Rockies:

Bouncing ball to Chase Utley, this should be the game, Chase throws him out and that will be it as the Phils win 2 out of 3 here at Coors Field, coming back to take this one by a score of 7 to 5.

==== Miscellany ====
Kalas was known for his love of the Frank Sinatra song, "High Hopes", a melody he sang at numerous events, including the Phillies' championship celebrations in his later years. His most famous singing of "High Hopes" came in 1993 when he sang to the team after they clinched the NL East division title. On April 17, 2009, at the first home game after Kalas's death, fans sang along with a video of Harry singing "High Hopes" during the seventh-inning stretch, instead of the traditional "Take Me Out to the Ball Game". The Phillies subsequently began playing the video after victories at Citizens Bank Park and have done so ever since.

Kalas had sung "Take Me Out To The Ball Game" during the seventh-inning stretch at Wrigley Field in Chicago on several occasions in tribute to Harry Caray, the late voice of the Chicago Cubs, who had led fans in that song at most home games. However, by that time, Kalas, a native of the Chicago area, had become an openly avid Phillies fan, and held the microphone out to the audience to hear them sing "the Cubbies" as they replaced their team's name for "the home team" in the song's lyrics.

Kalas, due to his stay in Hawaii, was very proficient at pronouncing Polynesian names. He also liked to slowly enunciate certain players' names, especially those with ethnic names. His personal favorite, Mickey Morandini, was pronounced as "Mi-ckey Mor-an-DI-ni".

Kalas attributed his leathery voice to his habit of smoking Parliament cigarettes, and some of the Phillies players lit up Parliaments after Kalas' death as a tribute.

=== NFL Films ===
Kalas joined NFL Films as a narrator in 1975. He became its primary voice, following the passing of John Facenda in 1984. He provided the narration to the highlights on Inside the NFL from its inception in 1976 through the 2008 season. Following Kalas' death, fellow Philadelphia Phillies announcer Scott Graham took over his Inside the NFL duties.

=== Other ventures ===
In addition to his work with the Phillies and NFL Films, Kalas called various sports over the years for the Mutual Broadcasting System, CBS Radio, and Westwood One Radio (including the NFL, MLB, college basketball, and Notre Dame football). Kalas joined Dennis Green to call the 1985 Aloha Bowl between Alabama and USC. For many years, he narrated the "Alcoa Fantastic Finishes" in-game highlights spots, for use during NFL telecasts. His voice was used for narration of WLVT-TV's documentary on the Lehigh-Lafayette Rivalry, produced in 2004. Kalas also lent his voice to NFL Network's game telecasts, reading sponsor plugs during commercial breaks. He was replaced by Pat Summerall after his death.

Along with Joe Kapp, Kalas called the 1982 Liberty Bowl...the last game of Paul "Bear" Bryant's career and his 323rd victory.

Kalas also lent his voice to the commercials for the movie Leatherheads, as well as commercials for the Campbell's, including Campbell's Chunky Soup, GMC Truck, Sega Genesis Sports Games, Coors Light, and others.

Kalas provided the recorded voice-over for much of the self-guided tours at the United States Mint in Philadelphia and the Gateway Arch in St. Louis. He did voicework for the 1995 and 1996 St. Louis Rams highlights.

He also narrated/commentated Animal Planet's Puppy Bowls I-V from 2005 to 2009. Puppy Bowl VI was dedicated in his memory.

He also made an appearance on the song "Rain Delay" by the Philadelphia-based rock group Marah.

== Personal life ==
Kalas had three sons: Todd, Brad, and Kane. Todd is a former Philadelphia Phillies broadcaster, who worked as a pregame/postgame–show host and is currently a play-by-play announcer for the Houston Astros. Kane is a professional poker player.

== Death ==
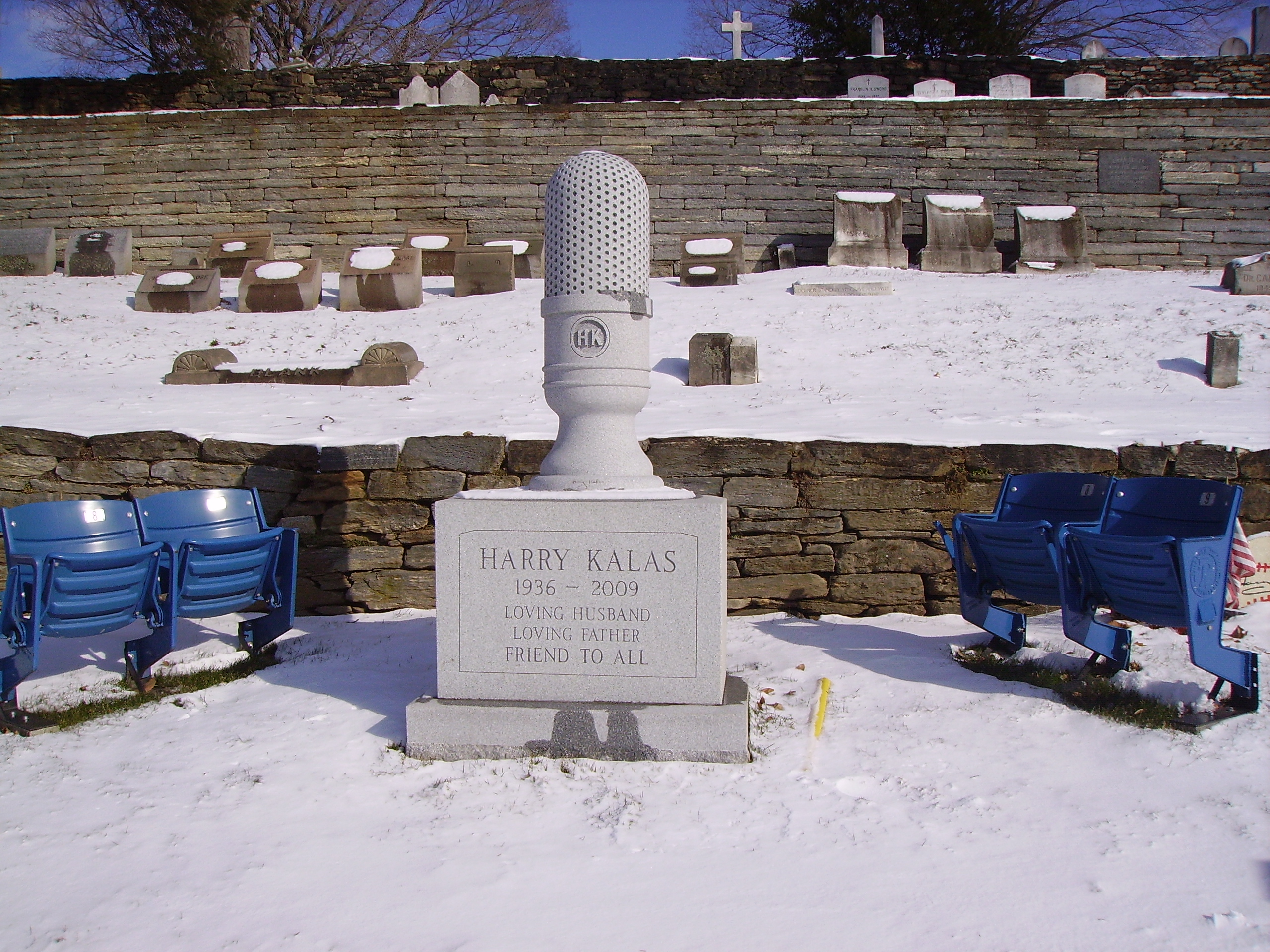
Permanent tombstone added to Kalas's grave in 2010 including two pairs of seats from Veterans Stadium, photographed January 10, 2011.

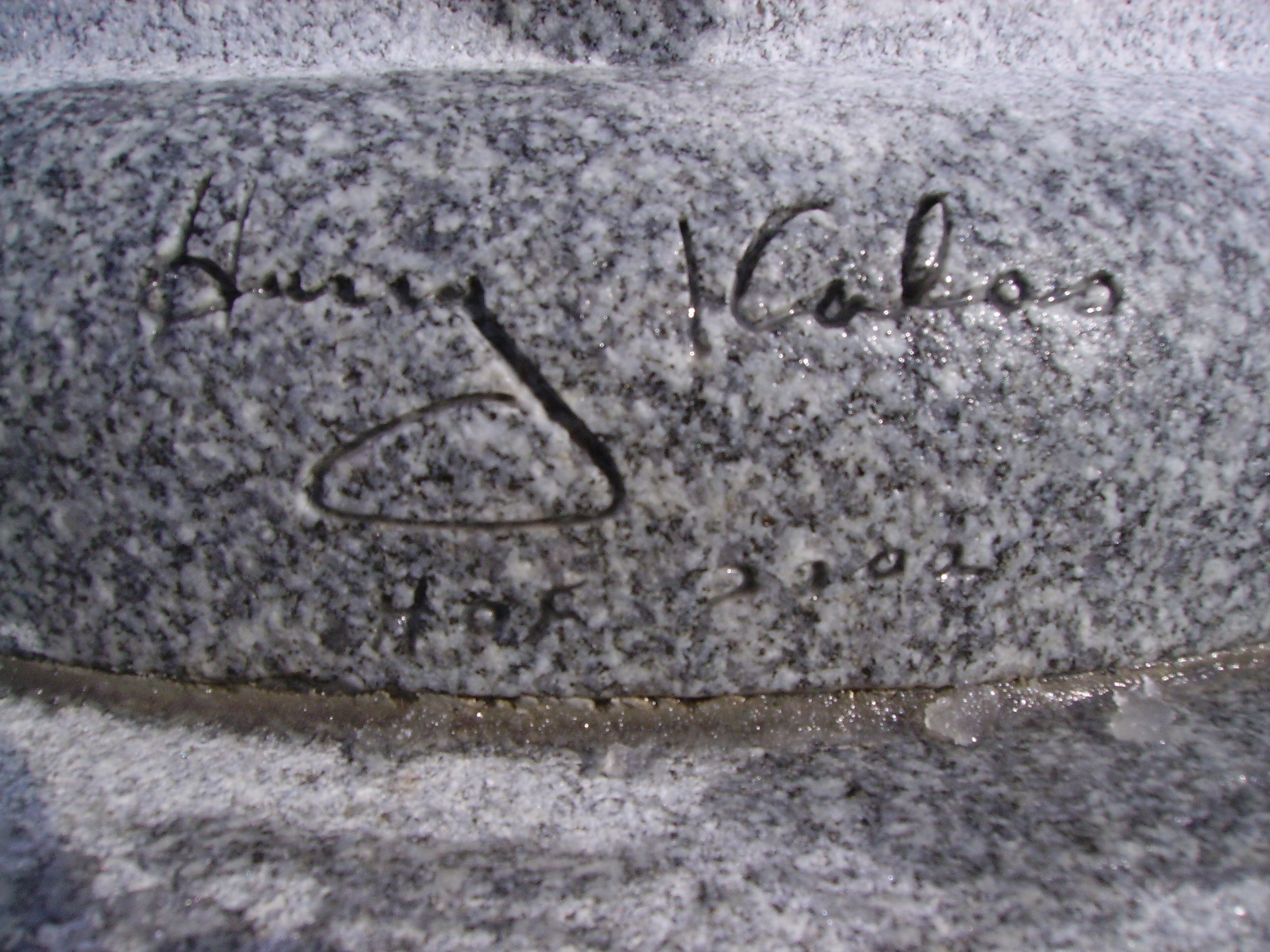
Replica of Kalas's autograph on base of microphone on tombstone, including "HOF 2002" which Kalas added after receiving the Ford C. Frick Award

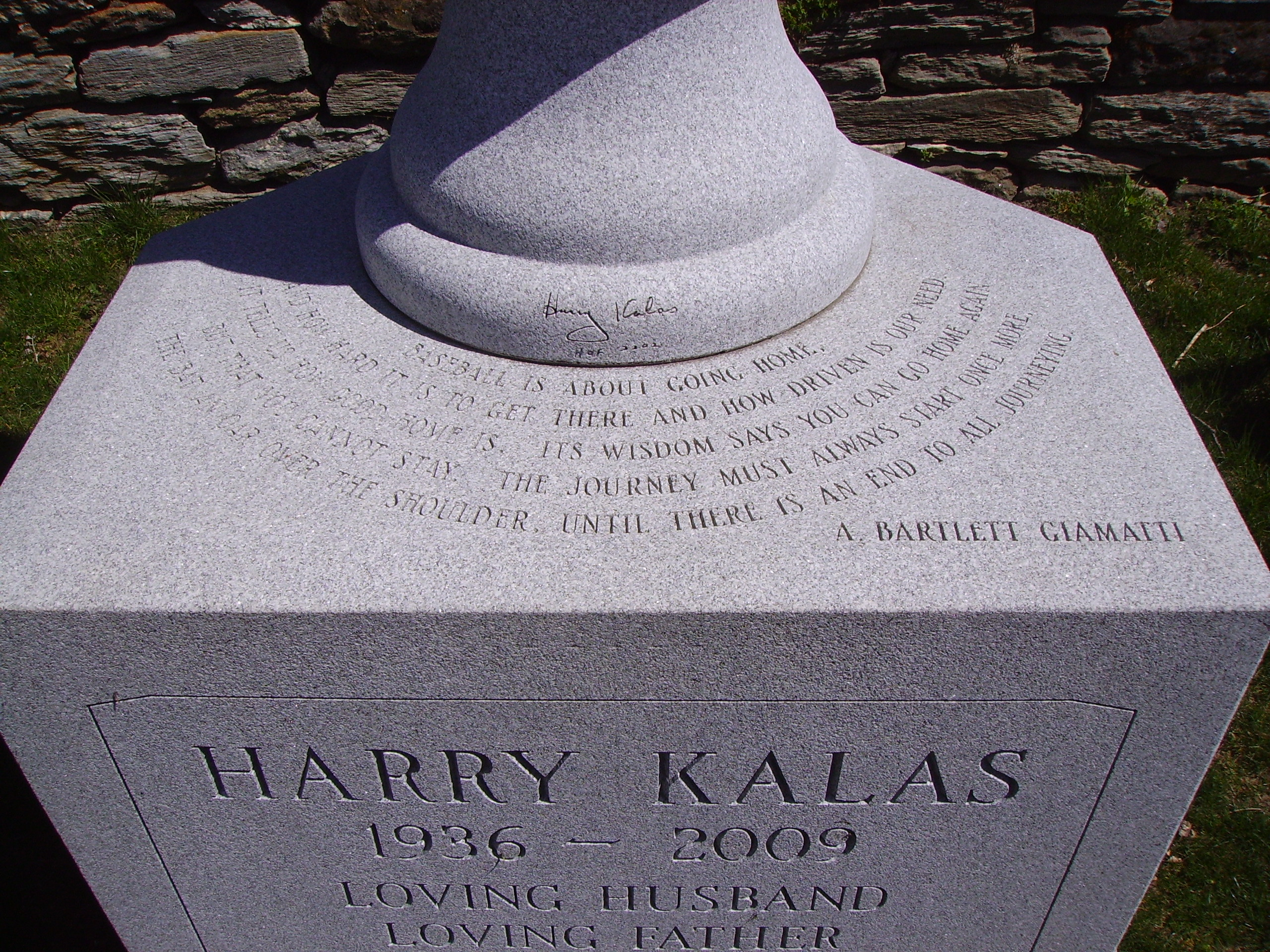
Baseball quote by A. Bartlett Giamatti on Kalas tombstone, added winter of 2011-12

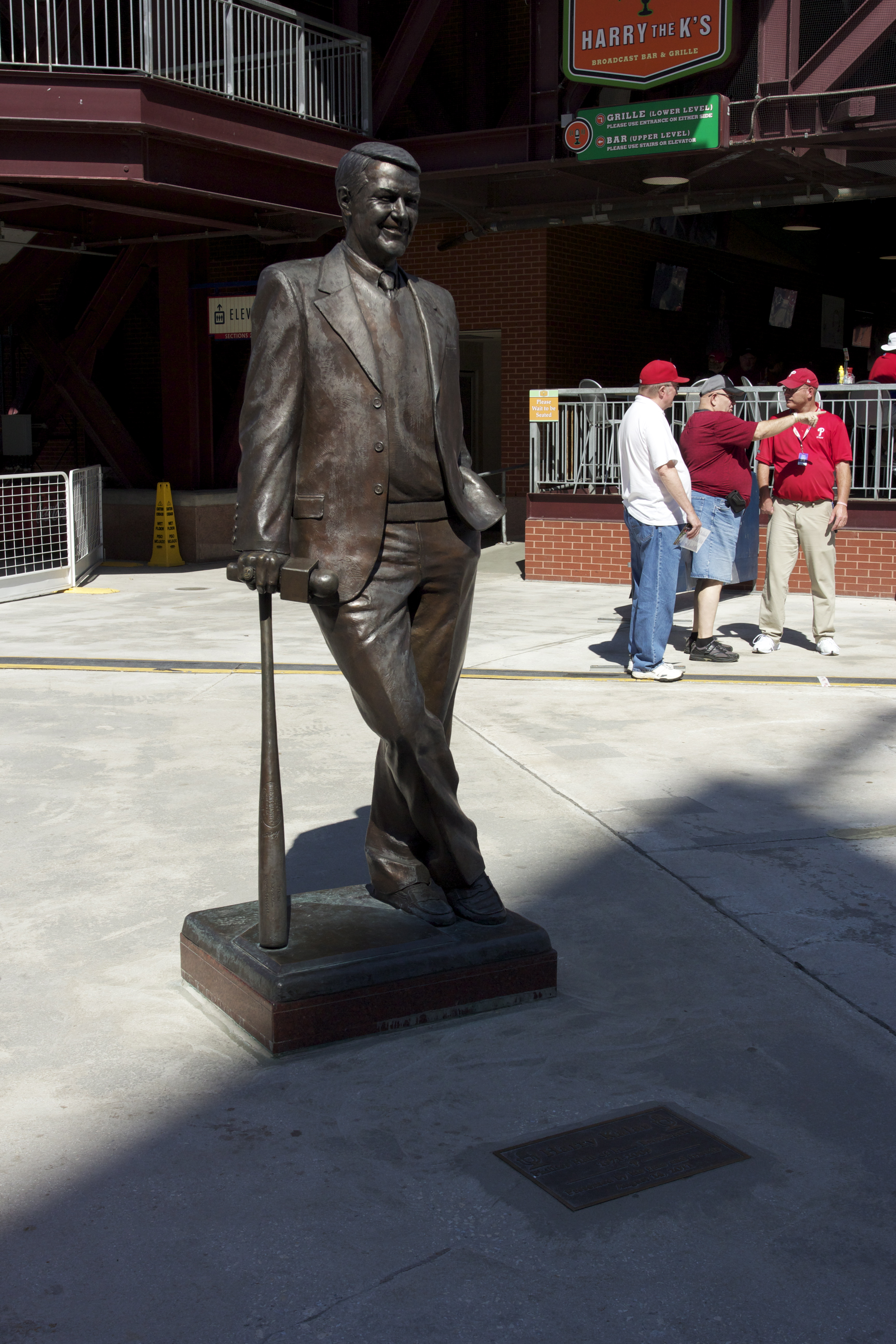
Harry Kalas statue at Citizens Bank Park, in front of the restaurant named in his honor

Kalas died of heart disease on Monday, April 13, 2009, in Washington, D.C. He collapsed in the Nationals Park press box at approximately 12:30 pm, several hours before the Washington Nationals' home opener against the Phillies. Kalas was rushed to George Washington University Hospital, where he was pronounced dead at 1:20 pm EDT.

"We lost Harry [today]," David Montgomery, the team president, said. "We lost our voice." Before the game began, Kalas's death was announced to the crowd, his picture was displayed on the scoreboard, and the stadium observed a minute of silence. The Phillies went on to win the game, 9–8. The Phillies saluted Kalas by placing a picture of him in their dugout during the game. Center fielder Shane Victorino also saluted Kalas after hitting a solo home run by pointing up to the press box where Kalas would have called the game. Phillies fans created a makeshift memorial at the Mike Schmidt statue outside Citizens Bank Park at the Third Base Gate shortly after Kalas's death was announced.

Kalas suffered from atherosclerosis and hypertension in his later years, but those illnesses did not seem to affect his announcing abilities; he called the Phillies' Rockies game in Denver on April 12, the day before his death. Kalas was in his 39th season with the Phillies.

Though the Phillies were scheduled to visit the White House on April 14 to celebrate their 2008 World Series championship, the visit was postponed so that the day could be set aside to remember Kalas. Their White House visit was pushed back to May 15, coinciding with the Phillies' next scheduled visit to Washington, D.C. to play the Nationals.

On Friday, April 17, 2009, following Kalas' death, his three children, Todd (himself a former Phillies broadcaster), Brad, and Kane, threw out the ceremonial first pitches before the Phillies first home game at Citizens Bank Park to Mike Schmidt, John Kruk, and Jimmy Rollins, representatives of the three decades of Phillies baseball with Kalas. After a moment of silence, Kane sang the national anthem.

The next day, Kalas became the fourth person to be given the honor of having their body lie in repose inside a Major League Baseball stadium after Babe Ruth, Jack Buck, and Miller Huggins. Kalas's casket was displayed behind home plate and fans were encouraged to pay their respects at Citizens Bank Park. Friends, broadcast partners, and every player on the Phillies team roster paid their respects before it was placed in a hearse, which carried him out of Citizens Bank Park one final time.

Kalas was interred at Laurel Hill Cemetery in Philadelphia. In August 2009, two pairs of seats from Veterans Stadium were installed at his graveside, one pair on each side, facing each other at a 45° angle. In the summer of 2010, a headstone was added to the grave, and the fan-made plywood "P" was removed as was the bronze plaque with his likeness. The headstone consists of a granite microphone with the letters "HK" in the middle and a likeness of Kalas' autograph, which includes the "HOF 2002" that Kalas added to his autographs after his receipt of the Ford C. Frick Award, at the microphone's base, and that sits on top of a raised base shaped like a home plate. Engraved in the base are the following words:

HARRY KALAS
1936 – 2009
LOVING HUSBAND
LOVING FATHER
FRIEND TO ALL

On September 29, 2010, Kalas's grave was resurfaced with sod that originally came from Citizens Bank Park, which was previously removed for the 2009 season when that stadium was re-sodded. The sod had been preserved in live condition for sale to fans at a southern New Jersey sod farm that deals in sod for sports arenas. That farm donated a portion of the former Citizens Bank Park sod when a fan, who volunteers at Laurel Hill Cemetery, contacted that farm regarding using that sod on Kalas's grave in Kalas's memory, as Kalas himself had walked on that sod, and had called the 2008 World Series victory which had come on that very grass.

During the winter of 2011–2012, a baseball quote by A. Bartlett Giamatti was added to the top of the home plate-shaped plinth of the tombstone. It reads,

Baseball is about going home, and how hard it is to get there and how driven is our need. It tells us how good home is. Its wisdom says you can go home again but you cannot stay. The journey must start once more, the bat an oar over the shoulder, until there is an end to all journeying.

== Honors ==
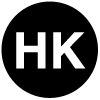
The patch worn over the heart of all Phillies players and coaches in 2009

Nicknamed "Harry the K" by Phillies pitcher Larry Christenson in the mid-1970s, a nickname quickly adopted by Phillies fans, Kalas received the Ford C. Frick Award from the National Baseball Hall of Fame in 2002. In 2004, he was named Person of the Year by the Broadcast Pioneers of Philadelphia. That year, he was also inducted into the Philadelphia Sports Hall of Fame, as a member of the charter class (21 members). He was named Pennsylvania Sportscaster of the Year 18 times.

Kalas also helped announce the ceremonial closing of Veterans Stadium on September 28, 2003, and was the master of ceremonies at the ceremonial opening of Citizens Bank Park in 2004.

At Citizens Bank Park, the restaurant built into the base of the main scoreboard is named "Harry the K's" in Kalas's honor. After Kalas's death, the Phillies' TV-broadcast booth was renamed "The Harry Kalas Broadcast Booth". It is directly next to the radio-broadcast booth, which is named "The Richie 'Whitey' Ashburn Broadcast Booth".

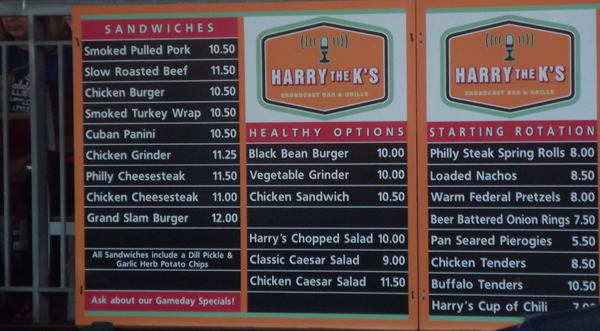
The menu board at Harry the K's Restaurant at Citizens Bank Park in Philadelphia, PA

When Kalas died on April 13, 2009, fans created an impromptu memorial tribute to him at the base of the statue of Mike Schmidt at the Third Base Gate of Citizens Bank Park.

The Phillies honored Kalas for the remainder of the 2009 season with a round, black "HK" patch over the heart on all player, coach, and manager jerseys. Additionally, a billboard featuring a microphone, his initials and lifespan ("HK 1936–2009") was displayed on the wall in left-center field during the 2009 season.

Immediately after the Phillies clinched the National League Eastern Division, the players all went to the billboard, lit cigars and poured beer and champagne on the billboard as a symbolic way of including Kalas in the celebration, as Kalas had participated in all of the Phillies' victory celebrations during his tenure in Philadelphia, including both World Series wins, having ridden in both of the Phillies World Series parades.

The Phillies players, led by Shane Victorino, hung Kalas' signature baby-blue blazer and white loafers in the dugout for every game.

Following Kalas' death, the Phillies began playing a video of Kalas singing the first verse of "High Hopes" at Citizens Bank Park after every Phillies win, as well as playing Kalas's famous "This ball is outta here!" call at Citizens Bank Park after every Phillies home run.

The Broadcast Pioneers of Philadelphia inducted Kalas into their Hall of fame in 2000 and named him their Person of the Year in 2004.

In 2009, Kalas was that year's inductee into the Philadelphia Baseball Wall of Fame.

In June 2009, the National Radio Hall of Fame announced that Kalas would be posthumously inducted into its Hall of Fame. Thirteen other sportscasters were previously inducted into the Hall of Fame.

Phillies fan Antonio Jose initiated an online petition seeking support for a statue of Kalas to be erected outside the Phillies' ballpark. As of May 2010, there were 24,000 signatories. Sculptor Lawrence Nowlan designed a model for the statue. In September 2010, a story that aired on the 10 Show on WCAU-TV stated that the full-size clay model for the statue was nearly complete, and was ready to have a mold of it cast so the actual bronze statue can be cast.

On Tuesday, August 16, 2011, the Nowlan sculpture, a 7-foot-tall (210 cm) bronze statue (which depicts Kalas standing cross-legged on a home plate, holding a microphone in his right hand, which also holds a baseball bat that he was leaning upon) was unveiled in the Ashburn Alley outfield concourse at Citizens Bank Park between Harry the K's Restaurant and the statue of Richie Ashburn prior to that evening's game versus the Arizona Diamondbacks. This unveiling was postponed from the previous Sunday, when the statue was scheduled to be unveiled prior to the game versus the Washington Nationals, which had been rained out.

The 2010 Mummers Parade on New Year's Day featured the Happy Tappers Comics dressed as Phillies players with the "HK" patch on the Phillies jerseys to pay tribute to Kalas and their theme was "Harry K's Field of Dreams."

== See also ==
- Houston Astros award winners and league leaders
- List of Philadelphia Phillies broadcasters
- List of sports announcers
- Broadcasting of sports events
- Philadelphia Phillies award winners and league leaders
- Philadelphia Baseball Wall of Fame

== Sources ==
- Miller, Randy (2010). Harry the K: The Remarkable Life of Harry Kalas. Running Press. ISBN 9780762440344.
