= Todd Kalas =

American sportscaster (born 1965)

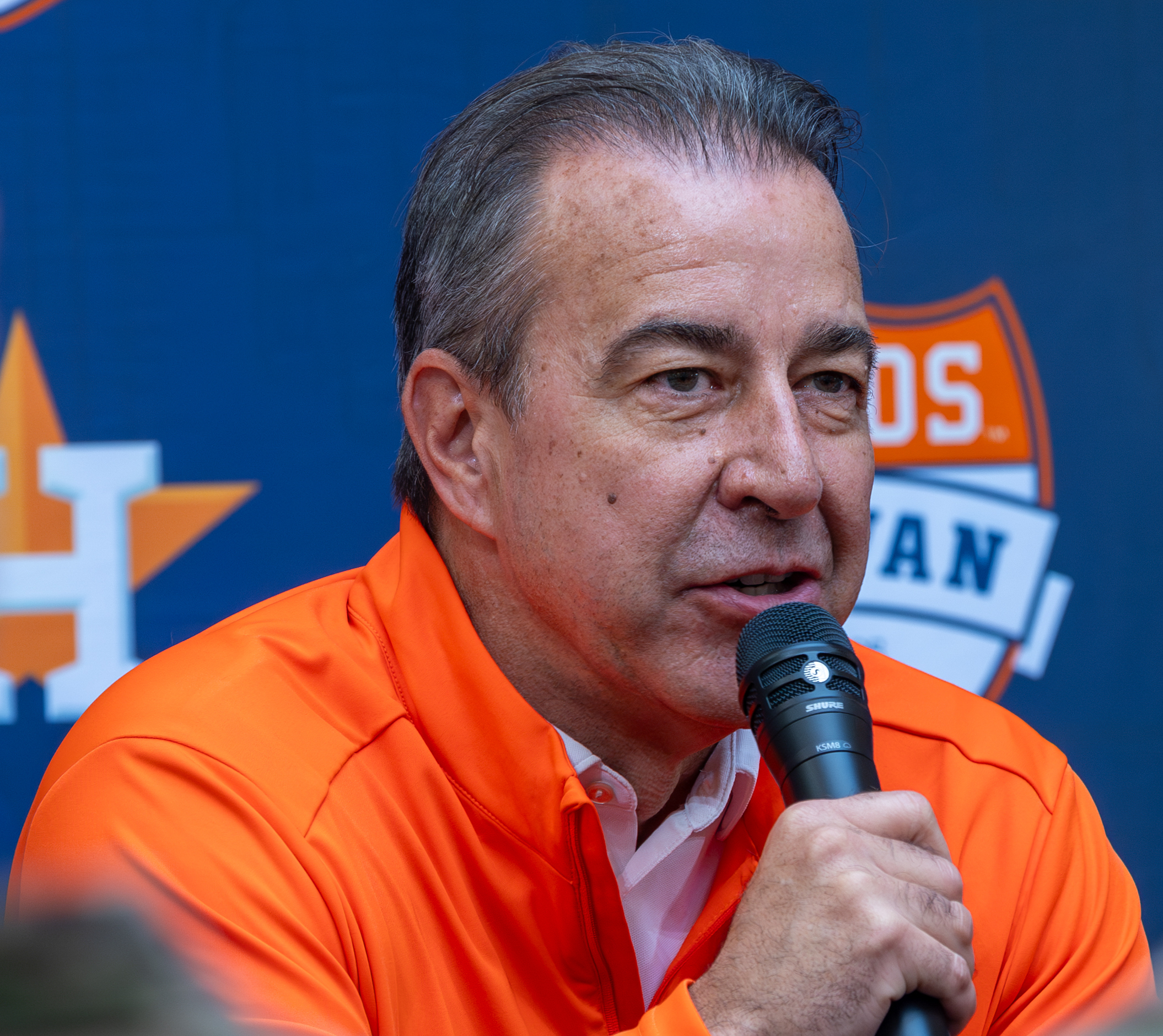
- Kalas in 2024

Houston Astros
- Broadcaster
- Born: December 31, 1965 (age 60); Houston, Texas, U.S.

Teams
- As Broadcaster: New York Mets (1992–1993); Philadelphia Phillies (1994–1996); Tampa Bay Devil Rays / Rays (1998–2016); Houston Astros (2017–present)

Todd Harry Kalas (born December 31, 1965) is an American sportscaster, employed since 2017 as a television play-by-play announcer for Houston Astros baseball.

== Education ==
Kalas graduated from Syracuse University's S. I. Newhouse School of Public Communications in 1988 with a degree in broadcast journalism. At Syracuse, he worked at WAER radio to call Syracuse Orange sports.

== Career ==
He moved to Tampa Bay as sports director at Vision Cable in Clearwater. He began his baseball career in 1991 with the Louisville Redbirds.

Before joining the Rays, he was on the radio broadcast team of the New York Mets for two years, and the television broadcast team of the Philadelphia Phillies for three years with his father.

=== Tampa Bay Rays ===
In 1998, Kalas joined the Rays' broadcasting team for their inaugural season and continued with the organization until 2016.

Kalas worked on Fox Sports Florida and Sun Sports in his primary role as pregame and postgame host and in-game reporter, and also substituted as color commentator when needed.

Kalas also filled in with play-by-play on both the Rays' television and radio networks.

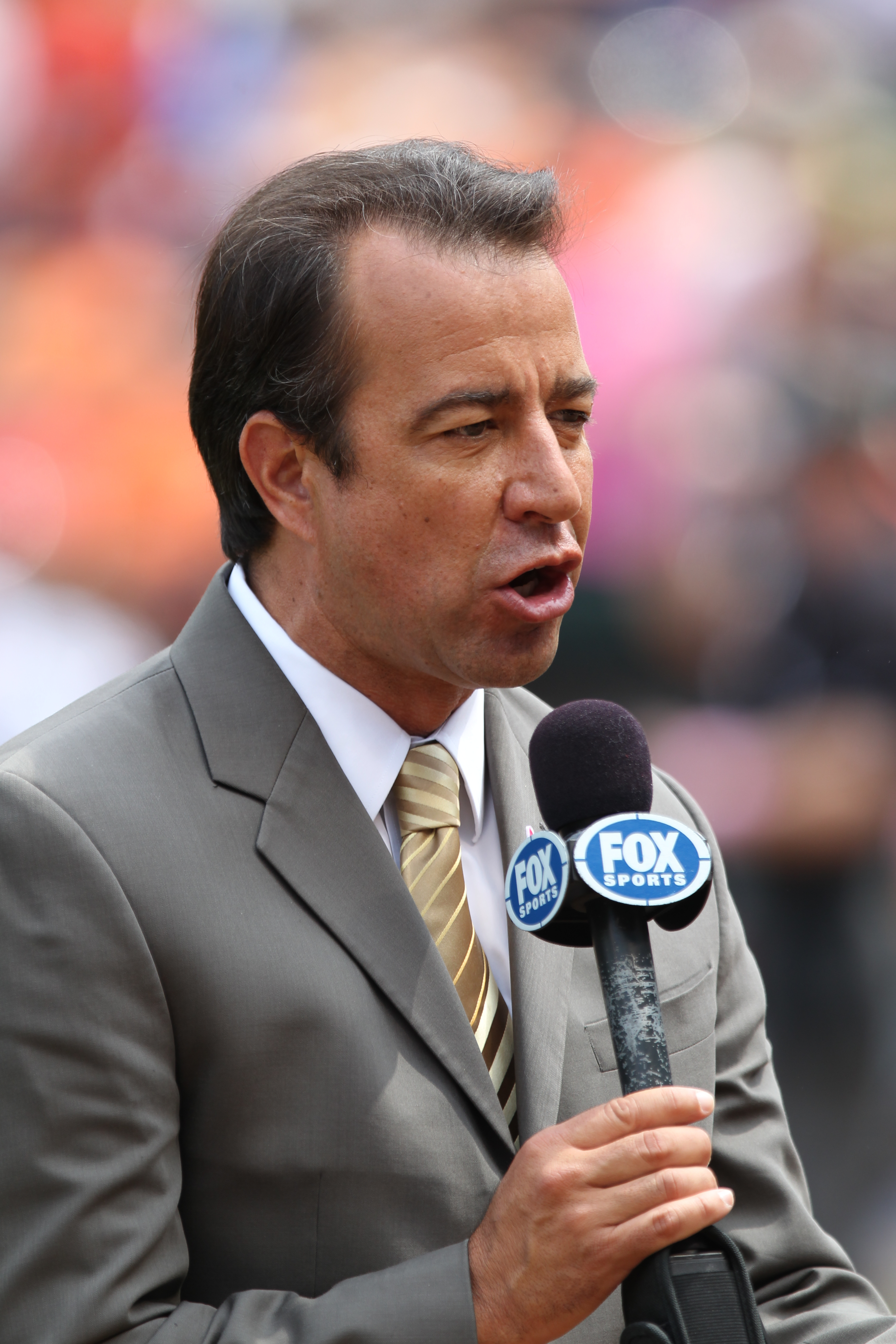
Kalas in 2011

=== Houston Astros ===
On December 22, 2016 Kalas was hired to be the Houston Astros' television play-by-play announcer on AT&T SportsNet Southwest, beginning with the 2017 season.

On September 29, 2019, it was announced by the Astros that they had extended Kalas’ contract through the end of the 2021 season, along with that of his TV-broadcasting sidekick, color-man Geoff Blum.

=== Non-Astros related assignments ===
In the offseason, Todd Kalas works with Cox Sports Television in Louisiana, handling play-by-play duties for college football, basketball and baseball. He is a part of the University of South Florida basketball radio broadcast team. He also fills in as pregame host for the Tampa Bay Lightning.

== Personal life ==
Kalas married Michele Allen on November 15, 2017. They reside in Houston. He is the oldest son of the late longtime Philadelphia Phillies Hall of Fame and Philadelphia Baseball Wall of Fame broadcaster Harry Kalas and the brother of professional poker player Kane Kalas.

After his father Harry's death on April 13, 2009, Todd, along with his younger brothers Brad and Kane, threw out the first pitch at the first home game in Philadelphia four days later. Todd's ball was thrown to former Phillies third baseman Mike Schmidt, who, like Todd’s father, is also in the Philadelphia Baseball Wall of Fame.
