= List of Los Angeles Angels broadcasters =

One of the primary reasons why Los Angeles was awarded an American League expansion franchise for the 1961 season was because actor/singer turned broadcast mogul Gene Autry wanted to secure radio broadcast rights for the newly planned Los Angeles American League franchise. His KMPC (710 AM, now KSPN) was the radio home of the Los Angeles Dodgers, from the time they arrived from Brooklyn, New York in time for the 1958 baseball season, and actually came away from the 1960 Winter Meetings with his own baseball team.

== Radio ==
Naturally, KMPC became the longtime radio outlet for Angels games throughout Southern California, although there was a period from 1997 that KRLA/1110 and 1998 to 2002 that KLAC (570 AM) became the team's flagship radio home. However, the Angels returned to their ancestral radio home at KSPN 710 AM, now since rebranded 710 ESPN, Los Angeles's ESPN Radio-operated outlet from the 2003 through 2007 seasons.

In 2006 team owner Arte Moreno purchased his own radio station, KMXE (830 AM), an Orange County-licensed Spanish-language formatted station. By mid-2006, 830 AM's programming was mostly in English (the principal exception being Angels games in Spanish), and the station's call sign was changed to KLAA. In October 2007, the Angels announced that KWKW "ESPN Deportes 1330" would carry games in Spanish, and AM 830 will carry Angels games in English, although games that conflict with Anaheim Ducks games will be transferred to another station.

In time for the 2008 baseball season AM 830 became the English-language outlet for Angels games, when their contract with KSPN expired.

In 2009, former Dodger radio flagship KFWB joined the Angels radio network, serving as a co-flagship of sorts alongside KLAA, carrying Monday through Friday games. It provided fans who live in certain parts of the Los Angeles market with a secondary outlet to listen to games.

In 2010, KSPN-AM AM 710 simulcast at least 60 games with KLAA to reach areas of the northwest area of the Los Angeles radio market. The deal returns the Angels to their old radio station from 2007. For 2011 KSPN will simulcast with KLAA for 25–30 weekend games.

On May 15, 2012, the Angels signed a radio rights deal with syndicator Compass Media to distribute 25 games to a nationwide audience, in a game-of-the-week format. These games would be produced separately from the KLAA broadcasts, and will feature veteran play-by-play men Chris Carrino and Steve Quis, with former New York Mets general manager and current SiriusXM sports talk show host Steve Phillips and former MLB player Darryl Hamilton as color commentators. Many of the games, if not all, will air on such stations as WFAN New York City (radio flagship of the Mets), WTEM Washington, D.C. (a Baltimore Orioles affiliate), WQXI Atlanta, WYGM Orlando, and KFNC Houston.

== Television ==
On the television side, the then-KHJ-TV (Channel 9) was the team's original home until the start of the 1964 season, when Autry moved the Angels to his then-newly purchased KTLA (Channel 5). KTLA remained the Angels' home for 32 seasons (while also carrying Dodgers games from 1993 to 2001). The team returned to Channel 9, by this time renamed KCAL-TV, because The Walt Disney Company bought a stake of the team and eventually became the full owner after Gene Autry's death in 1998. At the time the broadcast rights were secured before the 1996 season, Disney had owned KCAL-TV, until they were forced to sell the station when it bought ABC. Due to FCC regulations at the time, Disney could not own two television stations in the same city, as ABC owns KABC-TV.

KCAL-TV remained the home of Angels baseball for 10 seasons, until the 2005 season. The station began broadcasting Dodgers games, starting in the 2006 season. When Moreno took over as owner, starting in the 2004 season, he made sure more games were available for fans. Most Angels fans were accustomed to seeing probably more than 100 games annually, but the Angels televised more than 140 games, the most in franchise history. In addition to the 50 telecasts each on KCAL-TV and FSN West, the remaining telecasts were spread between UHF outlets KPXN-TV (Channel 30, a Pax/i O&O) and the hometown-based independent station KDOC-TV (Channel 56). In 2005, just KCAL-TV and FSN West combined to televise about 140 games.

On April 3, 2006, the Angels and its cable broadcaster partner, Fox Sports West, finalized a 10-year, $500 million deal. This deal voids the previous one in which Fox Sports West would only televise a minimum of 50 games annually until 2008. In this current deal, Fox Sports West would own the rights to 150 locally televised games annually, with 100 airing on West, while its sister over-the-air station, KCOP-TV (Channel 13) will televise 50 contests. The remaining games would either air exclusively on ESPN's Sunday Night Baseball or on Fox Television's Saturday Baseball Game of the Week package.

In 2009, Fox Sports West began broadcasting 25 additional games to its schedule, subtracting those from the KCOP package, bringing their total to 125 games. KCOP-TV's current schedule of 25 games will mostly consist of Sunday afternoon contests, and selected Saturday night games.

In December 2011—the same day news broke of the Angels signing a 10-year, $240 million contract with Albert Pujols—it was announced that the Angels also finalized a new 17-year television deal with Fox Sports West for $2.5 billion. Like the 2006 deal, this deal voided the previous one. As part of this new deal, the Angels also obtained a 25% equity stake in Fox Sports West.

On March 31, 2021, all Fox Sports Networks besides two would continue operating, however under the name Bally Sports, consequently, the Angels' home network, Fox Sports West would become Bally Sports West. This happened due to the Acquisition of 21st Century Fox by Disney, which forced Disney to sell the regional sports networks to Sinclair Broadcast Group's sports subsidiary, Diamond Sports Group, due to Disney's ownership of ESPN, and the United States Department of Justice determined the acquisition of the networks would cause Disney to create an anti-competitive pricing space. Sinclair then sold the naming rights of the networks to Bally's Corporation. Fox Sports West ended its coverage on March 31, 2021, with MLB Opening Day taking place on the Bally Sports West's launch.

On March 14, 2023, Diamond Sports Group filed for Chapter 11 Bankruptcy, following a missed $140 million interest payment 30 days prior. This bankruptcy caused missed payments to some teams, as well as two teams' broadcast rights being returned to the MLB. The Angels would ultimately continue to air on Bally Sports West, which was renamed FanDuel Sports Network West after the Diamond Sports Group (since renamed Main Street Sports Group) emerged from bankruptcy in 2025. During the 2025 season, the Angels announced that their partnership with KCOP would expand, with KCOP simulcasting FanDuel Sports Network-produced broadcasts of 12 Sunday games.

== Broadcasters ==
As with any sports team, the Angels have employed a number of radio and television broadcasters over the years. Among the many notable voices to call games for the team have been nationally recognized sportscasters Dick Enberg and Joe Garagiola, future Seattle Mariners announcer Dave Niehaus, late Hall of Fame pitcher Don Drysdale, Hall of Fame outfielder Reggie Jackson, longtime Detroit Tigers radio announcer Ernie Harwell and later Tigers TV voice Mario Impemba, former Arizona Diamondbacks TV announcer Daron Sutton (son of Hall of Famer Don Sutton), former New York Mets radio announcer Wayne Randazzo, Hall of Fame manager Sparky Anderson, and current MLB Network announcer Matt Vasgersian. Enberg is the play-by-play announcer most associated with the Angels, famous for his pet phrases "Oh, my!" and "And the halo shines tonight!".

Other Angels announcers have included Al Wisk, Joe Buttitta, Ron Fairly, Bob Starr, Paul Olden, Larry Kahn and Al Conin. Wisk, Starr and Olden, along with Enberg, Drysdale and Steve Physioc, were also Los Angeles Rams football announcers concurrent with their Angels duties; in fact, Physioc was the last radio play-by-play man of the Rams in their final season in Southern California (1994). Al Conin broadcast during the 1986 ALCS pennant race against the Red Sox. His broadcasting style was very similar to that of Dodgers' Hall of Famer Vin Scully. Longtime San Diego Padres and New York Yankees legend Jerry Coleman had a brief stint with the Angels in the early 1970s before joining the Padres.

A shake-up in the Angels’ broadcast team for the 2010 season was announced in November 2009. Rory Markas and Mark Gubicza were designated to take over the TV broadcasts in 2010, with Terry Smith and José Mota on radio. The contracts of Steve Physioc and former Major League player Rex Hudler were not renewed after 14 and 11 years' service, respectively, to long suffering viewers relief..

Markas died on January 4, 2010, of an apparent heart attack at his home in Palmdale, California.

The 2009 lineup of Angels broadcasters had been Physioc (TV and radio play-by-play), Rex Hudler (TV and radio analyst), Gubicza (TV analyst), José Mota (lead analyst on the Spanish radio broadcasts), Markas (radio and TV play-by-play), and Smith (radio play-by-play).

During the 2008 Major League Baseball season, Markas worked 75 games on television with Gubicza as analyst; Physioc and Hudler worked the remaining games on TV, but moved to the radio side whenever Markas and Gubicza worked on TV. Markas continued as the lead radio play-by-play announcer for the games Physioc and Hudler did for TV. Terry Smith continued his role as the No. 2 radio play-by-play man, while José Mota returned to his role as in-game reporter on TV and Spanish radio analyst.

In 2007, Mota and Fox Sports West/Prime Ticket analyst Gubicza had worked 50 telecasts (mostly road) for FSN West and KCOP, while Physioc and Hudler continued as the lead TV broadcast team for the Angels, working the remaining 100 local broadcasts. Veteran Spanish sportscaster Amaury Pi-Gonzalez joined the team for Spanish radio play-by-play for the 2007 season, replacing Ivan Lara.

Terry Smith, who handles mostly the middle innings on radio, has been referred to by some as this generation's Harry Kalas because Smith often uses Kalas' famous phrases as "that ball is out-ta here" on an Angels home run, or "struck him out" when the Angels strike out an opposing batter. Smith’s signature phrase to end games that the Angels win is "You can put a halo over this one!"

== Broadcasters through the years ==
- Sparky Anderson 1997–1998
- Steve Bailey 1961–1969
- Brian Barnhart 1998–1999
- Buddy Blattner 1962–1968
- Ken Brett 1987–1995
- Joe Buttitta 1982–1984
- Jerry Coleman 1970–1971
- Al Conin 1983–1992
- Don Drysdale 1973–1981
- Dick Enberg 1969–1978, 1985
- Ron Fairly 1981–1986
- Joe Garagiola 1990
- Rolando González 2008 (Spanish)
- Mark Gubicza 2007–present
- Wayne Hagin 2012–present (radio)
- Ernie Harwell 1992
- Rex Hudler 1999–2009
- Mario Impemba 1995–2001
- Reggie Jackson 1990
- Bob Jamison 1991–1992
- Charlie Jones 1990
- Bob Kelley 1961
- Harmon Killebrew 1983
- Steve Klauke 2016 (radio)
- Mark Langston 2013–present (radio)
- Ivan Lara 1997–2006 (Spanish)

- Rory Markas 2002–2009
- Joel Meyers 1987–1989
- José Mota 2000–2021 (Spanish) (analyst)
- Dave Niehaus 1969–1976
- Rolando Nichols 2009-11 (Spanish) (radio)
- Patrick O'Neal 2021–2026
- Paul Olden 1990
- Steve Physioc 1996–2009
- Amaury Pi-Gonzalez 2007–2008
- Jerry Reuss 1996–1998
- Wayne Randazzo 2023-present
- Victor Rojas 2010–2020
- Bob Rowe 1966–1994 "Doctor Angel Fever"
- Trent Rush 2022–present
- Billy Sample 1993–1994
- Steve Shannon 1980
- Terry Smith 2002–present (radio)
- Bob Starr 1980–1989, 1993–1997
- Daron Sutton 2000–2001, 2021 (secondary)
- Joe Torre 1985–1990
- Matt Vasgersian 2021–2025
- Rich Waltz 2021 (secondary)
- Don Wells 1961–1972
- Ken Wilson 1991–1995
- Al Wisk 1977–1979
- Geoff Witcher 1984

== Broadcast outlets throughout the years ==
=== Radio (flagship) ===
- KLAA (AM) (830 AM) English Flagship, 2008 - Present; Spanish 2006 - 2007
- KWKW & KTMZ (1330AM & 1220AM) Spanish Flagship, 2008 - Present
- KMPC/KDIS/KSPN (710 AM), 1961–1996, 2003–2007, 2007 - Present (Certain Games)
- KRLA (1110 AM), 1997
- KLAC (570 AM), 1998–2002
- KTNQ (1020 AM, Spanish), 2001?–2005

=== Radio Broadcasters by Year ===
| Year | Flagship Station | Play-by-play #1 | Play-by-play #2 | Play-by-play #3 | Color commentator(s) | Studio host |
| 2002 | KLAC (570 AM) (most games); KBIG (104.3 FM) (some games); KTNQ (1020 AM) (Spanish) | Rory Markas (early innings, late innings and odd number extra-innings); Ivan Lara (Spanish) | Terry Smith (middle innings and even number extra-innings) | | Rory Markas (middle innings and even number extra-innings); Terry Smith (early innings, late innings and odd number extra-innings); José Mota (Spanish) | |
| 2020 | KLAA (830 AM) (most games); KSPN (710 AM) (some games) | Terry Smith | Wayne Hagin | | Mark Langston | |
| 2022 | KLAA (830 AM) (most games); KSPN (710 AM) (some games) | Terry Smith | Wayne Hagin | Steve Klauke; Roger Lodge | Mark Langston; Bobby Grich | |

=== Radio Network (as of 2013) ===
==== California ====
| Station | Frequency | City |
|---|---|---|
| KLAA | 830 AM | Orange (English flagship) |
| KWKW / KTMZ | 1330 AM / 1220 AM | Los Angeles / Pomona (Spanish flagship) |
| KSPN | 710 AM | Los Angeles (select games) |
| KVTA | 1590 AM | Ventura-Oxnard-Santa Barbara |
| KJJZ-FM HD3/ K274DA | 95.9 HD3/ 102.7 FM | Palm Springs |
| KHTY | 970 AM | Bakersfield |
| KIGS | 620 AM | Hanford |
| KMET | 1490 AM | Banning/Riverside |
| KLAA | 830 AM | Victorville/Hesperia |
| KLOA | 1240 AM | Ridgecrest |

==== Nevada ====
| Station | Frequency | City |
|---|---|---|
| KWWN | 1100 AM | Las Vegas |

==== New Jersey ====
| Station | Frequency | City |
|---|---|---|
| WSNJ | 1240 AM | Millville |

==== Utah ====
| Station | Frequency | City |
|---|---|---|
| KZNS | 1280 AM | Salt Lake City |

=== Over the air television ===
- KHJ-TV/KCAL (Channel 9), 1961–1963, 1996–2005
- KTLA (Channel 5), 1964–1995
- KPXN-TV (Channel 30), 2004
- KDOC-TV (Channel 56), 2004
- KCOP-TV (Channel 13), 2006–2011, 2012–present (occasional games)

=== Cable television ===
- Fanduel Sports Network West (formerly Fox Sports West, Prime Ticket, Prime Sports West), 1992–present

=== Streaming ===
- Bally Sports+ 2022-Present

=== Television Broadcasters by Year ===
| Years | Channels | Play-by-play #1 | Play-by-play #2 | Play-by-play #3 | Color Commentator(s) | Sideline reporter(s) | Studio host | Television analyst |
| 1997–1998 | KCAL-TV; Fox Sports Net West | Steve Physioc | | | Sparky Anderson | | | |
| 1999–2005 | KCAL-TV; Fox Sports Net West | Steve Physioc | | | Rex Hudler | | | |
| 2006 | KCOP-TV; Fox Sports Net West | Steve Physioc | | | Rex Hudler | | | |
| 2007 | KCOP-TV; Fox Sports Net West | Steve Physioc | José Mota | | Rex Hudler; Mark Gubicza | | | José Mota |
| 2008–2009 | KCOP-TV; Fox Sports Net West | Steve Physioc | Rory Markas | | Rex Hudler; Mark Gubicza | | | José Mota |
| 2010–2020 | KCOP-TV; Fox Sports Net West | Victor Rojas | Terry Smith | | Mark Gubicza | Alex Curry | Patrick O'Neal; Kent French | Tim Salmon; José Mota |
| 2021 | KCOP-TV; Bally Sports West; Bally Sports SoCal | Matt Vasgersian | Rich Waltz; Daron Sutton | Patrick O'Neal; José Mota; Terry Smith | Mark Gubicza; José Mota | Alex Curry; José Mota | Patrick O'Neal; Kent French | Tim Salmon; José Mota |
| 2022 | KCOP-TV; Bally Sports West; Bally Sports SoCal | Matt Vasgersian | Patrick O'Neal | Terry Smith; Trent Rush | Mark Gubicza; Tim Salmon; Garret Anderson; Bobby Grich | Erica Weston | Patrick O'Neal; Kent French | Tim Salmon; Mark Gubicza |
| 2023–present | KCOP-TV; Bally Sports West; Bally Sports SoCal | Wayne Randazzo | Trent Rush | | Mark Gubicza; Tim Salmon; Garret Anderson; Bobby Grich; Bobby Valentine | Erica Weston | Kent French | Tim Salmon; Mark Gubicza |

== See also ==
- List of current Major League Baseball broadcasters
