= 2003 Anaheim Angels season =

Major League Baseball season

2003 Anaheim Angels
- League: American League
- Division: West
- Ballpark: Edison International Field of Anaheim
- City: Anaheim, California
- Record: 77–85 (.475)
- Divisional place: 3rd
- Owner: Arte Moreno
- General manager: Bill Stoneman
- Manager: Mike Scioscia
- Television: Fox Sports Net West; KCAL-9 •Rex Hudler, Steve Physioc
- Radio: KSPN (AM 710) •Terry Smith, Rory Markas; KTNQ (AM 1020—Spanish) •José Mota, Ivan Lara
- Stats: ESPN.com; Baseball Reference

The 2003 Anaheim Angels season was the 43rd season of the Los Angeles Angels franchise in the American League, the 38th in Anaheim, and their 38th season playing their home games at Edison International Field of Anaheim. The Angels entered the season as the defending World Series champions.

However, the Angels finished third in the American League West Division with a record of 77 wins and 85 losses.

== Offseason ==
- January 23, 2003: Adam Riggs was signed as a free agent with the Anaheim Angels.

== Regular season ==
- August 16, 2003: Adam Riggs played for the Angels in a home game against the Tigers on August 16. He would gain notoriety because of the jersey he wore in the game. Riggs wore a sleeveless jersey that read "A-N-G-E-E-S" across the front. Riggs did not realize the mistake until his teammates advised him in the dugout between innings.

=== Season standings ===
AL West
Team	W	L	Pct.	GB	Home	Road
Oakland Athletics	96	66	.593	—	57‍–‍24	39‍–‍42
Seattle Mariners	93	69	.574	3	50‍–‍31	43‍–‍38
Anaheim Angels	77	85	.475	19	45‍–‍37	32‍–‍48
Texas Rangers	71	91	.438	25	43‍–‍38	28‍–‍53

=== Record vs. opponents ===
2003 American League record Source: MLB Standings Grid – 2003
Team	ANA	BAL	BOS	CWS	CLE	DET	KC	MIN	NYY	OAK	SEA	TB	TEX	TOR	NL
Anaheim	—	1–8	3–6	3–4	6–3	6–1	6–3	5–4	3–6	8–12	8–11	6–3	9–10	2–7	11–7
Baltimore	8–1	—	9–10	2–4	3–3	3–3	3–4	3–4	6–13–1	2–7	4–5	8–11	7–2	8–11	5–13
Boston	6–3	10–9	—	5–4	4–2	8–1	5–1	2–4	9–10	3–4	5–2	12–7	5–4	10–9	11–7
Chicago	4–3	4–2	4–5	—	11–8	11–8	11–8	9–10	4–2	4–5	2–7	3–3	3–4	6–3	10–8
Cleveland	3–6	3–3	2–4	8–11	—	12–7	6–13	9–10	2–5	3–6	3–6	5–2	4–5	2–4	6–12
Detroit	1–6	3–3	1–8	8–11	7–12	—	5–14	4–15	1–5	3–6	1–8	2–4	1–6	2–7	4–14
Kansas City	3–6	4–3	1–5	8–11	13–6	14–5	—	11–8	2–4	2–7	4–5	4–3	7–2	1–5	9–9
Minnesota	4–5	4–3	4–2	10–9	10–9	15–4	8–11	—	0–7	8–1	3–6	6–0	5–4	3–3	10–8
New York	6–3	13–6–1	10–9	2–4	5–2	5–1	4–2	7–0	—	3–6	5–4	14–5	4–5	10–9	13–5
Oakland	12–8	7–2	4–3	5–4	6–3	6–3	7–2	1–8	6–3	—	7–12	6–3	15–4	5–2	9–9
Seattle	11–8	5–4	2–5	7–2	6–3	8–1	5–4	6–3	4–5	12–7	—	4–5	10–10	3–4	10–8
Tampa Bay	3–6	11–8	7–12	3–3	2–5	4–2	3–4	0–6	5–14	3–6	5–4	—	3–6	11–8	3–15
Texas	10–9	2–7	4–5	4–3	5–4	6–1	2–7	4–5	5–4	4–15	10–10	6–3	—	5–4	4–14
Toronto	7–2	11–8	9–10	3–6	4–2	7–2	5–1	3–3	9–10	2–5	4–3	8–11	4–5	—	10–8

=== Roster ===
2003 Anaheim Angels
Roster
Pitchers: 27,55 Kevin Appier; 51 Chris Bootcheck; 51,36 Mickey Callaway; 53 Brendan Donnelly; 38 Gary Glover; 63 Kevin Gregg; 58 Greg Jones; 41 John Lackey; 52 Bart Miadich; 36,45 Ramón Ortiz; 40 Troy Percival; 57 Francisco Rodríguez; 18 Rich Rodriguez; 60 Scott Schoeneweis; 34 Aaron Sele; 62 Scot Shields; 54 Derrick Turnbow; 56 Jarrod Washburn; 77 Ben Weber	Catchers: 3 Tom Gregorio; 1 Bengie Molina; 28 José Molina; Infielders: 5 Alfredo Amezaga; 47 Wilson Delgado; 27 Trent Durrington; 22 David Eckstein; 20 Brad Fullmer; 10 Benji Gil; 25 Troy Glaus; 2 Adam Kennedy; 39 Robb Quinlan; 9 Adam Riggs; 23 Scott Spiezio; 44 Shawn Wooten	Outfielders: 16 Garret Anderson; 55 Jeff DaVanon; 17 Darin Erstad; 6 Chone Figgins; 46 Gary Johnson; 8 Eric Owens; 43,39 Julio Ramírez; 15 Tim Salmon; 64,45 Barry Wesson	Manager: 14 Mike Scioscia; Coaches: 24 Bud Black (pitching); 4 Alfredo Griffin (first base); 7 Mickey Hatcher (hitting); 70 Joe Maddon (bench); 88 Orlando Mercado (bullpen catcher); 13 Bobby Ramos (bullpen); 12 Ron Roenicke (third base)

== Player stats ==
=== Batting ===
==== Starters by position ====
Note: Pos = Position; G = Games played; AB = At bats; H = Hits; Avg. = Batting average; HR = Home runs; RBI = Runs batted in

Pos	Player	G	AB	H	Avg.	HR	RBI
C	Bengie Molina	119	409	115	.281	14	71
1B	Scott Spiezio	158	521	138	.265	16	83
2B	Adam Kennedy	143	449	121	.269	13	49
SS	David Eckstein	120	452	114	.252	3	31
3B	Troy Glaus	91	319	79	.248	16	50
LF	Garret Anderson	159	638	201	.315	29	116
CF	Darin Erstad	67	258	65	.252	4	17
RF	Jeff DaVanon	123	330	93	.282	12	43
DH	Tim Salmon	148	528	145	.275	19	72

==== Other batters ====
Note: G = Games played; AB = At bats; H = Hits; Avg. = Batting average; HR = Home runs; RBI = Runs batted in

Player	G	AB	H	Avg.	HR	RBI
Shawn Wooten	98	272	66	.243	7	32
Eric Owens	111	241	65	.270	1	20
Chone Figgins	71	240	71	.296	0	27
Brad Fullmer	63	206	63	.306	9	35
Benji Gil	62	125	24	.192	1	9
José Molina	53	114	21	.184	0	6
Alfredo Amézaga	37	105	22	.210	2	7
Robb Quinlan	38	94	27	.287	0	4
Adam Riggs	24	61	15	.246	3	5
Wilson Delgado	19	50	16	.320	0	4
Tom Gregorio	12	19	3	.158	0	2
Trent Durrington	12	14	2	.143	0	1
Barry Wesson	10	11	2	.182	1	3
Gary Johnson	5	8	3	.375	0	0
Julio Ramírez	6	2	0	.000	0	0

=== Pitching ===
==== Starting pitchers ====
Note: G = Games pitched; IP = Innings pitched; W = Wins; L = Losses; ERA = Earned run average; SO = Strikeouts

Player	G	IP	W	L	ERA	SO
Jarrod Washburn	32	207.1	10	15	4.43	118
John Lackey	33	204.0	10	16	4.63	151
Ramón Ortiz	32	180.0	16	13	5.20	94
Aaron Sele	25	121.2	7	11	5.77	53
Kevin Appier	19	92.2	7	7	5.63	50

==== Other pitchers ====
Note: G = Games pitched; IP = Innings pitched; W = Wins; L = Losses; ERA = Earned run average; SO = Strikeouts

Player	G	IP	W	L	ERA	SO
Scot Shields	44	148.1	5	6	2.85	111
Mickey Calloway	17	38.1	1	4	6.81	22
Kevin Gregg	5	24.2	2	0	3.28	14
Chris Bootcheck	4	10.1	0	1	9.58	7

==== Relief pitchers ====
Note: G = Games pitched; W = Wins; L = Losses; SV = Saves; ERA = Earned run average; SO = Strikeouts

Player	G	W	L	SV	ERA	SO
Troy Percival	52	0	5	33	3.47	48
Brendan Donnelly	63	2	2	3	1.58	79
Ben Weber	62	5	1	0	2.69	46
Francisco Rodríguez	59	8	3	2	3.03	95
Scott Schoeneweis	39	1	1	0	3.96	29
Greg Jones	18	0	0	0	4.88	28
Gary Glover	18	1	0	0	5.00	14
Derrick Turnbow	11	2	0	0	0.59	15
Rich Rodriguez	3	0	0	0	2.45	3
Bart Miadich	1	0	0	0	18.00	3

== Farm system ==
Level	Team	League	Manager
AAA	Salt Lake Stingers	Pacific Coast League	Mike Brumley
AA	Arkansas Travelers	Texas League	Tyrone Boykin
A	Rancho Cucamonga Quakes	California League	Bobby Meacham
A	Cedar Rapids Kernels	Midwest League	Todd Claus
Rookie	AZL Angels	Arizona League	Brian Harper
Rookie	Provo Angels	Pioneer League	Tom Kotchman

Records
Preceded by 2002	Anaheim Angels seasons 2003	Succeeded by 2004
