= José Mota (baseball) =

Dominican baseball player (born 1965)

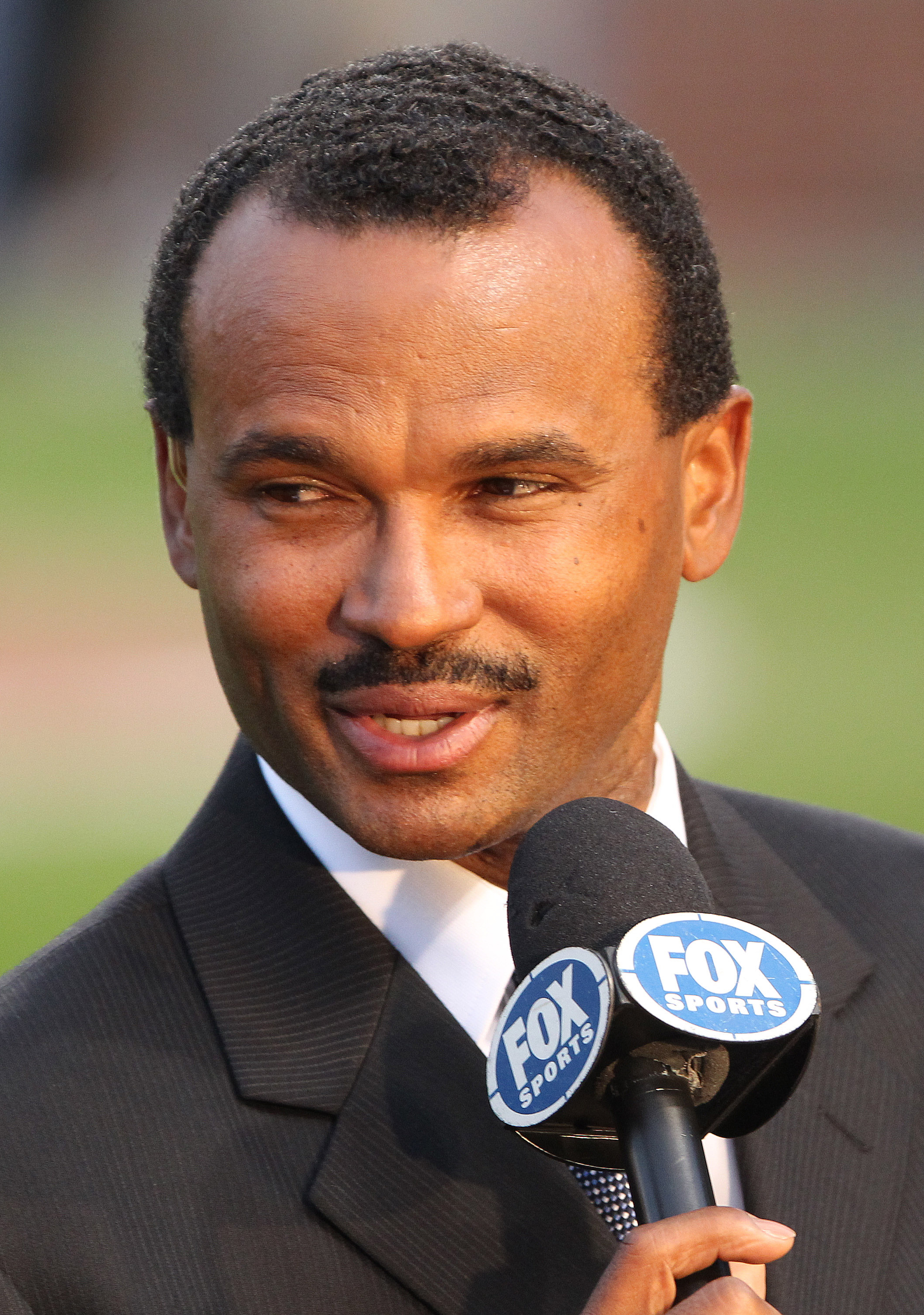
- Mota in 2011.
- Second baseman
- Born: March 16, 1965 (age 61); Santo Domingo, Dominican Republic
- Batted: Both Threw: Right

MLB debut
- May 25, 1991, for the San Diego Padres

Last MLB appearance
- June 2, 1995, for the Kansas City Royals

MLB statistics
- Batting average: .211
- Hits: 8
- Runs batted in: 2
- Stats at Baseball Reference

Teams
- San Diego Padres (1991); Kansas City Royals (1995)

José Manuel Mota Matos (born March 16, 1965) is a Dominican-American baseball broadcaster. He currently covers the Los Angeles Dodgers on Spectrum SportsNet LA. He formerly covered the Los Angeles Angels with Bally Sports West from 2002 until his departure in 2022. He began on the Angels Spanish broadcast in 2002 and took on various roles on the English television broadcast starting in 2007. He worked alongside Amaury Pi-Gonzalez in the broadcast booth in Spanish and alongside Mark Gubicza in English. Fully bilingual, he conducts postgame interviews and often doubles as the translator for Spanish-speaking players. He served as a pre-and-postgame analyst on Angels Live and occasionally filled in as a backup play-by-play announcer for English broadcasts. He is the son of former baseball player and long-time Dodgers coach Manny Mota.

== Playing career ==
Mota attended Cal State Fullerton in Orange County on a baseball scholarship. He was drafted in the second round of the 1985 amateur draft by the Chicago White Sox. He spent time in the Texas Rangers and Los Angeles Dodgers organizations before being drafted by the Oakland Athletics in 1988 with the rule 5 draft. He was then sent to the San Diego Padres in 1989 in a three-team trade and made his major league debut in 1991 with the Padres. He later signed with the Kansas City Royals as a free agent, but only appeared in two games in 1995.

In 19 games, Mota had 8 hits in 38 at-bats, resulting in a .211 batting average. He scored four runs and drove in two more.

== Broadcasting career ==
Following his playing career, Mota sought to work in baseball broadcasting. He was mentored by Stu Nahan, Jim Hill, and Fred Roggin, among others. Mota's first major broadcast job was a brief fill-in stint for Jaime Jarrín on the Los Angeles Dodgers Spanish broadcast.

=== Los Angeles Angels ===
Mota worked on the Angels' Spanish-language radio broadcasts beginning in 2002. With the team adding 50 games to their English-language television package in 2007, Mota added those games to his workload.

Mota has previous television experience as a sideline reporter, and he also filled in for Rex Hudler during his suspension in 2003. He also was a third announcer in the team's over-the-air television booth in 2004 and 2005.

Soon after the conclusion of the 2007 season, the Angels announced that Mota would no longer work as the play-by-play announcer for television games broadcast in English as he had done during that season. His place was taken by Rory Markas, who doubled as the radio play-by-play announcer for the Angels until Markas's death on January 4, 2010. Victor Rojas would take Markas's spot. Along with partner Mark Gubicza, he would cover roughly 75 games for the Angels.

During the first half of the 2021 season, Mota occasionally filled in as the English play-by-play announcer when the primary commentators, Matt Vasgersian and Daron Sutton, were unavailable due to other broadcast obligations. After Sutton was replaced mid-season by Rich Waltz, Patrick O'Neal took over Mota's de facto "third-string" play-by-play broadcasting role, filling in when Vasgersian was broadcasting with ESPN or MLB Network and when Waltz was broadcasting with CBS Sports. Mota returned to his more typical roles of Angels Live analysis and field-level reporting in the second half of the 2021 season.

On February 3, 2022, Mota announced on Instagram that he decided to depart Bally Sports West. He expressed his gratitude for the Angels organization and said he felt it was time for a "new chapter" but did not immediately announce his future plans.

=== Major League Baseball on FOX ===
Mota worked for FOX on their coverage of the 2006 Major League Baseball postseason after Steve Lyons was removed from the broadcast for perceived racially insensitive remarks.

=== Los Angeles Dodgers ===
In March 2022, it was announced that Mota would join the Spectrum SportsNet LA broadcast team to cover the Los Angeles Dodgers. He was among a group of newcomers to the network that included Jessica Mendoza, Adrián González, Eric Karros, and Dontrelle Willis.

=== Other ventures ===
Mota has also handled several Spanish language assignments in both baseball and football for Fox Sports. Mota also did English language coverage of the 2009 Caribbean Series with Florida Marlins broadcaster Cookie Rojas, the father of eventual Angels broadcaster Victor Rojas, on MLB Network.

Mota made one film appearance, in the 1999 Kevin Costner film For Love of the Game as a Dominican shortstop.

== Personal life ==
Mota's father, Manny, was an MLB player who also spent over three decades with the Dodgers as a coach. Because of his father's involvement with the Dodgers, Mota grew up around the team's clubhouse and served as a batboy. His brother, Andy, played for the Houston Astros and now works as a player agent. His cousin, José Báez, played for the Seattle Mariners.

== See also ==
- List of second-generation Major League Baseball players

== Sources ==
- Career statistics from Baseball Reference · Fangraphs · Baseball Reference (Minors) · Retrosheet · Baseball Almanac
- Los Angeles Angels of Anaheim broadcasters
- José Mota at IMDb
