= Mark Gubicza =

American baseball player and analyst (born 1962)

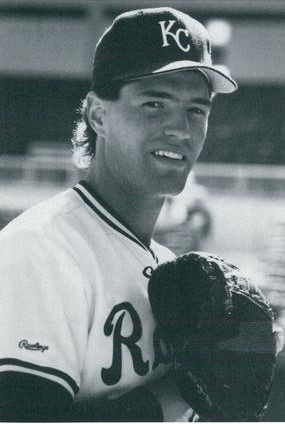
- Gubicza with the Kansas City Royals in 1988
- Pitcher
- Born: August 14, 1962 (age 63); Philadelphia, Pennsylvania, U.S.
- Batted: Right Threw: Right

MLB debut
- April 6, 1984, for the Kansas City Royals

Last MLB appearance
- April 11, 1997, for the Anaheim Angels

MLB statistics
- Win–loss record: 132–136
- Earned run average: 3.96
- Strikeouts: 1,367
- Stats at Baseball Reference

Teams
- Kansas City Royals (1984–1996); Anaheim Angels (1997)

Career highlights and awards
- 2× All-Star (1988, 1989); World Series champion (1985); Kansas City Royals Hall of Fame

Mark Steven Gubicza (/ˈɡʊbɪzə/; born August 14, 1962), nicknamed "Gubie", is an American former professional baseball pitcher and current sportscaster. Gubicza played in Major League Baseball (MLB) for the Kansas City Royals (1984–96) and Anaheim Angels (1997). He is a color commentator for Los Angeles Angels games on FanDuel Sports Network West.

After being drafted out of William Penn Charter School in the second round of the 1981 MLB draft and playing three seasons in the minor leagues, Gubicza spent nearly all of his MLB career with the Royals, making all but two of his career appearances with the team. He was a mainstay in the Royals starting rotation for years, earning back-to-back MLB All-Star selections in 1988 and 1989 and making an Opening Day start for the team in 1989. Gubicza played a reduced number of games later in his career due to three arm injuries and a leg injury between 1990 and 1997. He was traded to the Anaheim Angels before the 1997 season and retired after that year.

At the time of his retirement, Gubicza held the Royals franchise record for strikeouts with 1,366, was third in wins at 132, and was second in pitching wins above replacement with 38.0. He was inducted into the Kansas City Royals Hall of Fame in 2006. Following his playing career, Gubicza became a sportscaster and worked in various roles before joining the Angels broadcast booth on Fox Sports West as a color commentator in 2007.

== Early life ==
Mark Gubicza was born on August 14, 1962, in Philadelphia. He is the son of Anthony Gubicza Jr., who pitched in the Chicago White Sox organization for three years and later served as a part-time coach for the Villanova Wildcats. Gubicza is of Hungarian and Polish ancestry.

Growing up, Gubicza was interested in several sports, including baseball, basketball, football, hockey, and boxing. In Little League, he played shortstop and pitched. In one 17-game stretch in Little League, Gubizca accrued 57 hits. Gubicza attended the William Penn Charter School where he was teammates with eventual professional player Rubén Amaro Jr. Though he grew up in Philadelphia, he idolized Baltimore Orioles pitcher Jim Palmer. Coming out of high school, Gubicza had collegiate offers from Alabama, Georgia, Duke, and USC, among others. Gubicza and his father were present at Veterans Stadium for game six of the 1980 World Series, witnessing the Philadelphia Phillies win their first championship.

== Professional career ==
=== Kansas City Royals ===
==== 1981–1983: Minor leagues ====
Gubicza was drafted by the Kansas City Royals in the second round of the 1981 Major League Baseball draft, the 34th overall pick. He began his professional baseball career at age 18 with the Royals Gold in the Gulf Coast League, where he went 8-1 with a 2.25 earned run average (ERA) and 40 strikeouts in 56 innings. Gubicza played for the Fort Myers Royals in the Florida State Class A League in 1982 and missed most of the season due to injuries. In 1983, he was assigned to the Jacksonville Suns, the Royals Double-A team in the Southern League, managed by Gene Lamont. Gubicza was 14–12 with a 2.72 ERA and 146 strikeouts in 196 innings.

==== 1984–1986: Early success ====
On April 6, 1984, Gubicza made his major league debut against the Cleveland Indians at Royals Stadium at the age of 21. He pitched 6 innings, gave up 5 hits, 1 run, and struck out 4. Through the first 10 starts of his career, Gubicza posted a 3.14 ERA across 66 innings. He threw his first shutout on May 12 against the Boston Red Sox. Despite Gubicza's pitching stats, he did not accrue many wins as the Royals had trouble providing run support during his starts. Following a 3–0 loss to the Minnesota Twins on June 15 where he pitched 7 1/3 innings and gave up 2 earned runs, Gubicza dropped to a 3–6 record on the season. It was the fourth time that season that the Royals were shut out while Gubicza was pitching and the seventh time that the Royals scored three or fewer runs in one of his starts. By the end of the regular season, Gubicza had a 10–14 record with a 4.05 ERA across 189 innings. The Royals offense provided an average of 4.06 runs per Gubicza start, nearly equal to his ERA. Despite being a member of the four-man rotation that helped the Royals win the American League Western division that year, Gubicza did not get a chance to pitch in the 1984 American League Championship Series because Kansas City was swept in three games by the eventual World Series champion Detroit Tigers team.

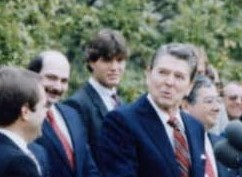
Gubicza (middle) looks on as President Ronald Reagan speaks during the Royals' 1985 White House visit

For his sophomore season in 1985, Gubicza joined a five-man rotation alongside Bud Black, Danny Jackson, Charlie Leibrandt, and Bret Saberhagen. The rotation posted a combined ERA below 3.00 through April and a combined 3.47 ERA by the end of the regular season, the sixth-best in the majors. Gubicza posted similar statistics to his previous season: a 4.06 ERA through 177 1/3 innings worked. His win-loss record improved to 14–10 as the Royals were able to provide him with more run support at an average of 4.70 runs per start. Gubicza made his only career postseason appearances during the 1985 American League Championship Series against the Toronto Blue Jays. In game one of the series, Gubicza entered the game as a relief pitcher in the fifth inning following a two-inning start by Leibrandt that resulted in five runs being surrendered. Gubicza worked three innings in relief, giving up no hits or runs while striking out two and walking one. In game six of the series, Gubicza was assigned his first postseason start while the Royals were down 3-2 and attempting a return from a 3–1 deficit. He lasted 5 1/3 innings, giving up three runs while accruing two strikeouts and walking three batters. The Royals won the game 5–3, setting them up for a winner-take-all matchup the following night that they would go on to win. While the Royals advanced to the 1985 World Series, Gubicza did not pitch as the team elected for a four-man rotation. Following the 1985 season, the Royals considered trading Gubicza to the San Francisco Giants for Chili Davis in order to bolster the team's offense. Kansas City's front office ultimately decided against it because San Francisco also wanted Darryl Motley and prospect Van Snider, a price that was seen as too high.

In 1986, Gubicza was a member of a revised Royals rotation as former starter Bud Black was moved to the bullpen. Gubicza posted a 3.64 ERA across 180 1/3 innings with a 12–6 record, finishing second behind Danny Jackson for the team lead in ERA. Gubicza pitched two shutouts in 1986, first against the Cleveland Indians on May 14 and later against the New York Yankees on August 17. Following the 1986 season, the Royals again considered trading Gubicza for Chili Davis. Gubicza was also named in talks for Seattle Mariners players Phil Bradley and Danny Tartabull, but he was not traded.

==== 1987–1989: All-Star selections ====
In 1987, Gubicza made a jump in his innings pitched, working 241 2/3 innings. He posted a 3.98 ERA and a 13–18 record and led the Royals with 166 strikeouts. He struggled at the start of the season and moved to a career 0–7 record in the month of April. Gubicza threw ten complete games and two shutouts, first on June 23 at Oakland and later on September 23 at Seattle.

In 35 starts in 1988, Gubicza set career bests in wins (20), shutouts (4), innings pitched (269 2/3), strikeouts (183), and ERA (2.70); he also threw eight complete games and had an AL-best 0.4 home runs per nine innings (HR/9). He threw a shutout against the eventual AL pennant winners, the Oakland Athletics, on September 16. Gubicza finished third in voting for the 1988 American League Cy Young Award behind Frank Viola and Dennis Eckersley. He was selected to his first career All-Star Game.

Gubicza followed up his career-best season with another All-Star season in 1989. He posted a 15–11 record in 255 innings with a 3.04 ERA and a league-leading 36 starts. He threw a shutout against the New York Yankees on June 2.

==== 1990–1996: Injury troubles ====
Through 16 starts in 1990, Gubicza had a 4–7 record across 94 innings with a 4.50 ERA and 71 strikeouts. In July, Gubicza and a team doctor decided that arthroscopic surgery was necessary for his injured right arm, effectively ending his season because the recovery timeframe was four to six months. The pain in his right arm began with a strain in his rotator cuff at the end of the 1989 season. The team originally thought his arm had healed over the offseason, so he pitched with the lingering injury from April to late June 1990. Gubicza underwent the arm surgery, the first of his career, on August 2.

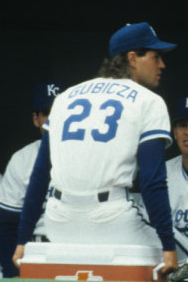
Gubicza in 1991

Gubicza was not ready to return to the mound until May 14, 1991, when he made his season debut in Toronto. In his first game since the surgery, he went five innings and surrendered three runs with eight strikeouts and one walk. Gubicza struggled throughout the 1991 season, including a June 26 game against the California Angels where he surrendered six runs and only lasted 2/3 of an inning. Through his first 10 games, Gubicza had a 5.98 ERA and a 4–5 record. By the end of the season, Gubicza accrued a 9–12 record across 133 innings with a 5.68 ERA and 89 strikeouts.

In 1992, Gubicza posted an improved 3.72 ERA across 111 1/3 innings through July. On July 10, Gubicza left a game against the Milwaukee Brewers after one inning because of stiffness in his right forearm. The Royals did not initially consider the discomfort to be a serious issue, but he was ultimately placed on the disabled list on July 15 because an examination found he had an inflamed synovial bursa. Gubicza began a 40-pitch rehab program on July 22, but he failed to complete it as the soreness in his arm lingered. He suffered another setback in his recovery in August, and speculation began to mount that his injury would be season-ending. Dr. Lewis Yocum examined Gubicza's arm on August 24 and found that his bursa had healed but he still had weakness in his rotator cuff, keeping him off the mound for another month, therefore ending his season.

In 1993, Gubicza started in six of the first seven turns of the rotation but was moved to the bullpen after struggling, including a 1 2/3-inning, 7-run start against the Boston Red Sox on April 8. Through his first seven appearances, he had a 6.55 ERA and an 0–4 record. During his time as a reliever, Gubicza lowered his season ERA to 4.66 while collecting two saves and eight holds across 43 appearances.

In 1994, Gubicza returned to the starting rotation. In the strike-shortened season, he posted a 7–9 record across 130 innings with a 4.50 ERA and 59 strikeouts.

In 1995, Gubicza's numbers improved. In 213 1/3 innings pitched, he put up a 12–14 record with a 3.75 ERA and 81 strikeouts. He led the major leagues in games started with 33.

The 1996 season was Gubicza's final year with the Royals. Through July, Gubicza had pitched 119 1/3 innings with a 4–12 record, 5.13 ERA, and 55 strikeouts. On July 5, in a start against the Minnesota Twins at the Hubert H. Humphrey Metrodome, Gubicza had to leave the game in the second inning after a batted ball hit by Paul Molitor broke his tibia. The Twins team doctor fitted Gubicza with a cast that day, signaling that he would be out for at least eight weeks. Gubicza did not pitch again that season. In his 13 seasons with Kansas City, he finished with a 132–135 record, a 3.91 ERA, 327 games started, 42 complete games, 16 shutouts, 2218 2/3 innings pitched, 1366 strikeouts, a 110 ERA+, a 3.67 FIP, and 9.6 SO/9.

=== Anaheim Angels ===
On October 28, 1996, the Royals traded Gubicza and prospect Mike Bovee to the Anaheim Angels in exchange for designated hitter Chili Davis, the same player who had been brought up in trade talks involving Gubicza in 1985 and 1986. The Angels made the trade to open the designated hitter spot for one of the team's four outfielders — Tim Salmon, Garret Anderson, Jim Edmonds, and Darin Erstad. Gubicza was brought on to an Angels pitching staff that had combined for a 5.29 ERA in the previous season, the second-worst in the league.

Gubicza only pitched 4 2/3 innings across two starts that season for the Angels, and he gave up 13 earned runs for an ERA of 25.07. In his first start since breaking his leg nine months earlier, he gave up only a solo home run through the first three innings against the Cleveland Indians, but he gave up seven runs in the fourth inning as the Indians batted around. On April 11, again pitching against the Indians, Gubicza gave up six runs in the second inning. Following his second start, Gubicza was sent back to Anaheim to receive an MRI on his shoulder. The results were normal but he received a cortisone injection and went on the disabled list. It was later revealed that Gubicza needed arthroscopic surgery for the second time in his career and he missed the remainder of the 1997 season as a result. He was not activated from the disabled list until October.

Following the 1997 season, the Angels re-signed Gubicza to a minor league contract but released him shortly thereafter. He signed a minor-league deal with the Los Angeles Dodgers in January 1998 but announced his retirement the following month, citing his injuries.

== Pitching style ==
Gubicza's early pitching was heavily influenced by his father, who had more time to coach his son due to an injury that prematurely ended his minor league baseball career. By the time he was in high school, Gubicza had learned to pitch with the "drop-and-drive" form, a pitching mechanic where the pitcher bends their non-dominant leg to add momentum to their throw. His usage of the mechanic was specifically based on Tom Seaver, a famous user of the drop-and-drive. This pitching mechanic helped Gubicza to reach 92 miles per hour (148 km/h) on his fastball and 82 miles per hour (132 km/h) on his curveball in high school.

While in the Royals minor league system, pitching instructor Gary Blaylock introduced the slider and sinker pitches into Gubicza's repertoire. Despite having a varied pitch mix, he was best known for his hard-thrown fastballs. In 1988, with the help of pitching coach Frank Funk, Gubicza loosened up his delivery, a change that delivered improved results. Following his arthroscopic surgery in 1990, Gubicza decreased the usage of his fastball and favored breaking balls in order to manage pain in his throwing arm.

== Broadcasting career ==
In 2000, Gubicza took a job as an analyst for the Fox Sports Net shows titled National Sports Report and Baseball Today. He was also offered a job to be on ESPN's Baseball Tonight, but declined because the show's studio in Bristol, Connecticut, was too far from home.

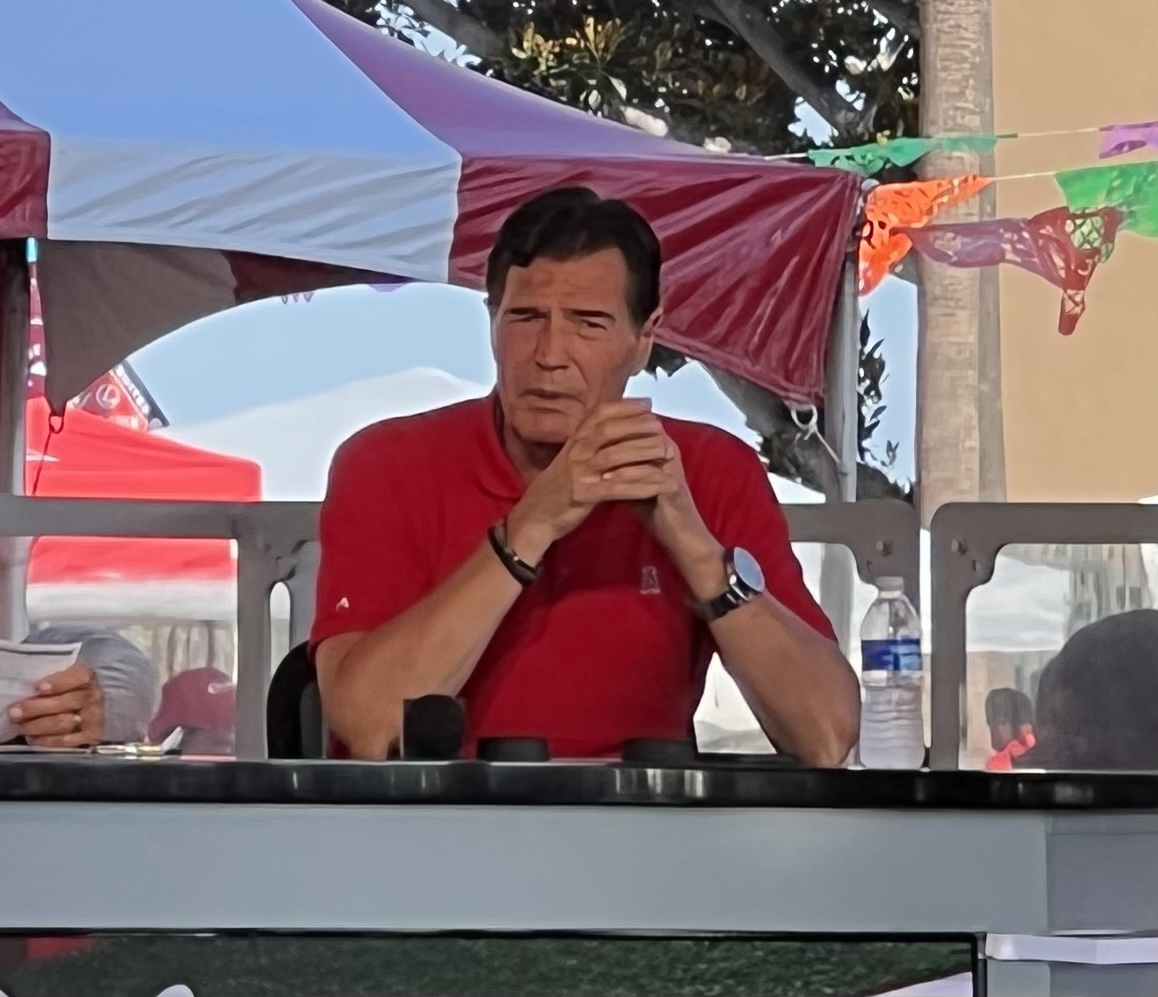
Gubicza on the set of Angels Live in 2022

Gubicza has worked for Bally Sports West, formerly known as Fox Sports West, since the mid-2000s. He has primarily served as a color commentator for Angels broadcasts, occasionally providing pre-game and post-game analysis on Angels Live and formerly for Dodgers Live. In 2007, he was paired with José Mota on 50 Angels telecasts on Fox Sports West/Prime Ticket and KCOP. He also co-hosted Angels in the Infield with Bill Macdonald. The Angels announced in 2008 that he would work roughly 75 games with Rory Markas on television during that season. Gubicza was slated to work with Markas on Angels broadcasts in 2010 before Markas's sudden death on January 4, 2010. On March 3, 2010, Victor Rojas was named as Markas's replacement, a broadcast partner Gubicza remained with until 2020. In 2021, Gubicza became a permanent fixture of an otherwise rotating broadcast booth that featured Matt Vasgersian as the primary play-by-play announcer with Daron Sutton (and later Rich Waltz) filling in when Vasgersian had to call games for ESPN or MLB Network. In 2022, Vasgersian remained on the network's primary broadcast team alongside Gubicza and became more available due to his departure from ESPN. In 2023, Wayne Randazzo joined the Angels booth as the new primary play-by-play announcer, working alongside Gubicza.

Gubicza hosts a weekly segment called "Gubie Tuesdays" that is shown during games between a commercial break and the return to action on the field. In the segment, Gubicza interviews various Angels players with open-ended questions about baseball or other lighthearted subjects.

== Legacy ==
Gubicza became known as a fastball pitcher in part due to his 6 ft 6 in, 215 lb (1.98 m, 97 kg) frame that helped him to develop a velocity above 90 miles per hour (140 km/h) as early as high school. Gubicza was also noted for his work ethic on the mound, with Royals general manager John Schuerholz describing him as having a "bulldog mentality." At the time of his retirement, Gubicza had the most strikeouts in Royals history with 1,366, since surpassed by Kevin Appier with 1,458. He also finished his Royals tenure third all-time in wins with 132 and second in pitching wins above replacement with 38.0.

On July 21, 2006, Gubicza was inducted into the Royals Hall of Fame in a pregame ceremony at Kauffman Stadium. Gubicza called his induction a "tremendous honor" and former teammates John Wathan and Jeff Montgomery spoke about his career at the ceremony.

Gubicza was inducted into the Missouri Sports Hall of Fame on January 31, 2010. He was inducted into the National Polish-American Sports Hall of Fame on June 16, 2022.

== Personal life ==
Gubicza met his wife, Lisa, at the wedding of Royals teammate Bret Saberhagen. While playing for the Royals, he resided for many years in the Northridge neighborhood of Los Angeles.

Following his playing career, the Royals offered Gubicza a job as a roving minor-league pitching instructor, but he declined. He spent several years coaching Little League and 14-U travel teams in the San Fernando Valley area. In August 2002, Gubicza was named the head baseball coach at Chaminade High School in West Hills, California, where he remained until 2007. Gubicza coached eventual MLB outfielder Kevin Pillar. Gubicza's son, Chad, attended Chaminade. Chaminade would sometimes play nearby Calabasas High School, a team that was coached by Gubicza's former Kansas City teammate Bret Saberhagen.

Because of his roots in Philadelphia, Gubicza is a fan of the various sports teams of the city. He has attended Philadelphia Eagles games with Angels outfielder Mike Trout, a native of Millville, New Jersey, who also roots for Philadelphia's teams.
