= Baseball IQ =

American television game show

Baseball IQ is a former American television game show that aired on MLB Network. It premiered on January 24, 2012, and featured a single-elimination, bracket-style trivia tournament focused on baseball knowledge.

The series consisted of one tournament season and did not continue beyond its initial run. Contestants were employees of Major League Baseball organizations, MLB.com, and the National Baseball Hall of Fame and Museum, competing for charitable donations on behalf of their organizations.

== Format ==
The tournament featured 32 contestants, each representing one of the 30 Major League Baseball teams, along with one representative from MLB.com and one from the National Baseball Hall of Fame and Museum.

Contestants competed in head-to-head matchups over up to eight innings of questions, followed by a ninth-inning bidding round. Each episode winner earned USD5,000 for a designated charity. The tournament champion’s charity received USD25,000, while the runner-up’s charity received USD15,000.

== Gameplay ==
Each game began with a buzz-in question known as the “Lead-off Home Run.” The first correct respondent gained control of the board and selected from eight trivia categories. Players alternated providing correct answers within a category until one player answered incorrectly, repeated an answer, or ran out of time.

Players could use one “Big Inning” per game to attempt four additional answers for bonus runs. Failure to complete the Big Inning successfully resulted in the loss of the runs earned in that inning. A mercy rule applied if one player achieved an insurmountable lead before the ninth inning.

In the ninth inning, contestants bid on how many correct answers they could provide in the final category. Ties were resolved with a sudden-death buzz-in question.

== Broadcast history ==
The series was hosted by Matt Vasgersian and aired exclusively on MLB Network in 2012. Promotional coverage described the program as a test of baseball knowledge among front-office and media professionals from across Major League Baseball organizations.

No additional seasons were produced following the initial tournament.

== Tournament results ==
The inaugural tournament was won by Shane Demmitt, representing the Los Angeles Angels, who defeated Ben Baumer of the New York Mets in the final round.

== Contestants ==
Organization	Participant	Title	Result
Angels	Shane Demmitt	Assistant Equipment Manager	Tournament winner
Mets	Ben Baumer	Statistical Analyst	Runner-up
White Sox	Dan Fabian	Director of Baseball Operations	Semifinalist
Diamondbacks	Josh DeFamio	Supervisor, dbTV Graphics	Semifinalist
