= ABTV =

American regional sports network

Angels Broadcast Television
- Type: Regional sports network
- Country: United States
- Broadcast area: Southern California; Las Vegas Valley; Hawaii; Nationwide (via satellite)
- Headquarters: Angel Stadium, Anaheim, California

Programming
- Languages: English; Spanish (via SAP)
- Picture format: 1080i (HDTV); 480i (SDTV)

Ownership
- Owner: Arte Moreno; (Angels Baseball LP)

History
- Launched: October 19, 1985; 41 years ago
- Former names: Prime Ticket (1985–1995); Prime Sports West (1995–1996); Fox Sports West (1996–1999 and 2012–January 27, 2021); Fox Sports Net West (1999–2004); FSN West (2004–2012); Bally Sports West (January 27, 2021–October 21, 2024); FanDuel Sports Network West (October 21, 2024–May 1, 2026)

Availability

Streaming media
- DirecTV Stream: Internet Protocol television
- FuboTV: Internet Protocol television

Angels Broadcast Television (ABTV or Angels TV) is an American regional sports network owned by Arte Moreno via the Los Angeles Angels. The channel broadcasts regional coverage of professional and collegiate sports events in California, focusing primarily on teams based in the Greater Los Angeles area. Angels Broadcast Television is available on cable providers throughout Southern California, the Las Vegas Valley and Hawaii; it is also available nationwide on satellite via DirecTV.

The network was founded on October 19, 1985 as Prime Ticket by the owners of the Los Angeles Lakers of the National Basketball Association and the Los Angeles Kings of the National Hockey League, which was then sold to Tele-Communications Inc. in 1994, which was then merged to Liberty Media in 1995. The following year, Liberty and News Corporation rechristened the network as Fox Sports West as part of the Fox Sports Networks chain where it remained so for the next two decades until it was acquired by Sinclair Broadcasting Group in 2019 when The Walt Disney Company acquired the assets of 21st Century Fox, formed from the split of News Corporation, and relaunched the channel as Bally Sports West. After the bankruptcy of its parent Main Street Sports Group, it was relaunched again in 2023 as FanDuel Sports Network West branding. In 2026, amidst the dissolution of FanDuel Sports Network, the Angels acquired the network and subsequently rebranded to its current name that May.

The network holds the regional broadcast rights to the Angels, as well as the Los Angeles Kings of the National Hockey League and West Coast Conference men's and women's basketball. The network also broadcast the Lakers until 2012, when broadcasts moved to Spectrum SportsNet.

== History ==
=== 1980s ===
Angels Broadcast Television was launched under the Prime Ticket name on October 19, 1985; the channel was originally co-owned by Dr. Jerry Buss, majority owner of the Los Angeles Lakers and Los Angeles Kings, and cable television pioneer Dr. Bill Daniels, who held a minority ownership interest in both franchises. Unlike many of the regional sports networks in operation at the time of Prime Ticket's launch, the channel was (and still is) structured as a basic cable channel, instead of a premium service. The network originally broadcast for seven hours a day, each evening from 5:00 p.m. to 12:00 a.m. The first contract with Prime Ticket was negotiated and signed by Tony Acone, who was appointed as president of the channel, and Bob Kerstein, chief financial officer of Falcon Cable TV. Leslie Watson, a certified public accountant employed by the accounting firm of Coopers & Lybrand, joined Prime Ticket as its first financial controller through the early years of the channel.

Prior to the launch of Prime Ticket, Los Angeles Lakers basketball and Los Angeles Kings hockey games (primarily home games that were not televised nationally) were carried within the Los Angeles market on the over-the-air subscription services ONTV and SelecTV, in addition various local TV stations. Its original general offices were located in a small office building located across the street from the Great Western Forum in Inglewood.

Prime Ticket became one of the leading regional sports networks in the United States, rivaling the New York City–based Madison Square Garden Network. The network was founded at the height of the Lakers' 1980s championship run, and also got a boost from the trade that brought Wayne Gretzky to the Kings in 1988.

In late 1988, Daniels partnered with Tele-Communications Inc. to form a new group of regional sports networks, known as the Prime Sports Network. Prime Ticket served as the flagship charter affiliate, joined by the newly formed owned-and-operated outlet Prime Sports Rocky Mountain (later AT&T SportsNet Rocky Mountain, now defunct), and two networks that served as affiliates, Home Sports Entertainment (now FanDuel Sports Network Southwest) and the newly launched Sunshine Network (now FanDuel Sports Network Sun).

=== 1990s ===
In 1990, Prime Ticket acquired the cable television rights to the California Angels (now the Los Angeles Angels) and the Los Angeles Clippers. The channel carried the Clippers' NBA games during the 1990-91 season, before the team struck a broadcasting agreement with SportsChannel Los Angeles (originally Z Channel) that went into effect the following season. SportsChannel Los Angeles later ceased operations in December 1992, which left the city's professional sports teams having to broadcast their locally televised games either over-the-air or in the form of select cable-exclusive telecasts for the next four years.

In 1994, the San Diego Padres came to an agreement with Prime Ticket to televise 25 home games on a new subfeed of Prime Ticket. Prime Ticket had previously been carried by cable providers in the San Diego area, but up until that point showed the same programming as Los Angeles. Prior to moving to Prime Ticket, the Padres were on the San Diego Cable Sports Network (a pay-per-view service operated by Cox Communications). The Padres would stay with Prime Ticket for only 3 seasons before returning to Cox on a basic cable service.

In August 1994, Buss and Daniels sold Prime Ticket to the Prime Network's parent company, Liberty Media, which subsequently rechristened the channel Prime Sports West. In 1996, News Corporation, which formed a sports division for the Fox network two years earlier after it obtained the broadcast rights to the National Football Conference, acquired a 50% interest in the Prime Network from Liberty Media.

On November 1, 1996, the Fox/Liberty joint venture relaunched the Prime Network affiliates as part of the new Fox Sports Net; as a result, the channel was officially rebranded as Fox Sports West. The following year, Fox Sports Net expanded to other regions with the purchase of a 40% interest in the SportsChannel networks through an asset trade with Cablevision Systems Corporation, forming the venture National Sports Partners to run the owned-and-operated regional networks.

On January 27, 1997, Fox Sports Net launched an additional channel, Fox Sports West 2 (currently FanDuel Sports Network SoCal). The in-market cable broadcasts of Los Angeles Clippers and Anaheim Ducks games moved to the new network which would also feature newly acquired rights to the Los Angeles Dodgers. UCLA and USC basketball games which were not part of Fox's Pac-10 package were also moved to Fox Sports West 2. The launch of the new network allowed Fox Sports West to focus its major league sports coverage of the Los Angeles Lakers, Los Angeles Kings and Anaheim Angels.

=== 2000s ===
Logos for Fox Sports West and Prime Ticket, used from 2009 to 2012.

In 2000, Fox Sports West was rebranded as Fox Sports Net West, as part of a collective brand modification of the FSN networks under the "Fox Sports Net" banner.

In 2001, Fox Sports West and West 2 relocated their offices and studios from the Century City section of Los Angeles to Downtown, in an office building two blocks east of the Staples Center. During this time, a street-side studio for the channel's game telecasts opened at the exterior of the Staples Center, at the southwest corner of 11th (Chick Hearn Court) and South Figueroa Streets. In 2004, the channel rebranded under the shortened names FSN West, as part of Fox Sports' de-emphasis of the "Fox Sports Net" brand across its regional networks.

On April 3, 2006, FSN West 2 rebranded as FSN Prime Ticket, beginning with the Dodgers season opener against the Atlanta Braves at Dodger Stadium. The change was made to address the perception of viewers that FSN West 2 was a secondary network. Both networks adopted a new philosophy to concentrate more on local originally-produced content (such as the documentary series Before the Bigs and In My Own Words, and team-themed Insider shows) and less on supplemental national programming provided by Fox Sports Net. FSN West reverted to the Fox Sports West moniker in 2008.

In the fall of 2009, just as rival ESPN opened its new Los Angeles–based broadcast center directly across the street at the L.A. Live complex, Fox Sports West shut down its Staples Center streetside studio. The channel began to produce its pre-game and post-game shows at the site of each televised event shown on the two networks; as weather permits, pre-game and postgame shows for most Clippers, Lakers and Kings home game are produced at Star Plaza, near the main entrance of Staples Center. The former Fox Sports Staples Center studio has since been converted into a conference center, with Nike as the corporate sponsor.

=== 2010s ===
In 2012, Fox Sports West and independent station KCAL-TV (channel 9) lost the television rights to the Lakers to Time Warner Cable under a new 20-year contract, which began in the 2012-13 season with the launch of the new Time Warner Cable SportsNet. The new service also acquired the rights to air WNBA's Los Angeles Sparks and MLS's Los Angeles Galaxy games. In January 2013, TWC also signed with the Los Angeles Dodgers, establishing a new team-specific channel known as SportsNet LA.

In July 2013, News Corporation spun off the Fox Sports Networks and most of its other U.S. entertainment properties into 21st Century Fox.

On December 14, 2017, as part of a merger between both companies, The Walt Disney Company announced plans to acquire all 22 regional Fox Sports networks from 21st Century Fox, including Fox Sports West. However, on June 27, 2018, the Justice Department ordered their divestment under antitrust grounds, citing Disney's ownership of ESPN. On May 3, 2019, Sinclair Broadcast Group and Entertainment Studios (through their joint venture, Diamond Holdings) bought Fox Sports Networks from The Walt Disney Company for $10.6 billion. The deal closed on August 22, 2019.

=== 2020s ===
Former logo as Bally Sports West, used from 2021 to 2024.

On November 17, 2020, Sinclair announced an agreement with casino operator Bally's Corporation to serve as a new naming rights partner for the FSN channels. Sinclair announced the new Bally Sports branding for the channels on January 27, 2021. On March 31, 2021, coinciding with the 2021 Major League Baseball season, Fox Sports West was rebranded Bally Sports West.

On March 14, 2023, Diamond Sports filed for Chapter 11 bankruptcy. On October 21, 2024, the network rebranded as FanDuel Sports Network West as part of a new sponsorship with FanDuel, following Diamond's exit from bankruptcy as Main Street Sports Group.

In 2026, amid financial difficulties at Main Street Sports Group, and reports suggesting that the company would cease operations after the conclusion of the current NBA and NHL seasons, the nine remaining MLB teams still under contract with Main Street terminated their agreements. Out of the affected teams, the Angels were one of two who did not move to MLB Local Media; reports surfaced that the Angels were considering buying out Main Street's 50% stake in the West channel to give it full ownership, pending word on whether such a deal could be complicated by creditors if the company were to file for Chapter 7 bankruptcy. In the meantime, absent a television broadcaster during spring training, the team announced an in-market subscription streaming package on MLB.tv known as Angels.tv.

Former logo as FanDuel Sports Network West, used from 2024 to 2026.

On March 9, 2026, it was announced that the Angels had reached an agreement to acquire Main Street Sports Group's stake in FanDuel Sports Network West, and that it would continue its operations as a team-owned channel. It was also confirmed that the Angels had reached an agreement with the Los Angeles Kings to broadcast the team's games for at least the 2026–27 season. Angels president John Carpino stated that the agreement would "[provide] a seamless transition for viewers while continuing to offer the same high-quality broadcasts they have come to expect", while also allowing for new distribution options (such as Angels.tv). The Kings later renewed its television deal through the 2027–28 season and announced a partnership with DAZN for its in-market subscription streaming service.

The channel continued to operate under the "FanDuel Sports Network" name at the start of the 2026 MLB season. On May 1, 2026, the team announced that the channel had been renamed to Angels Broadcast Television (ABTV). In September 2026, the Angels announced that it would sell a majority stake in the team to Stan Kroenke, who operates the regional sports network Altitude Sports and Entertainment for his teams in Denver (including the Colorado Avalanche of the NHL).

== Programming ==
As of 2026, the network holds rights to the Los Angeles Angels (indefinite due to the team's ownership of the channel), and hold rights to the Los Angeles Kings of the National Hockey League until 2027–28 season.

Beginning in 2025, the Angels also simulcast 12 games each season on KCOP-TV.

Between live game broadcasts, ABTV airs a wide variety of sports and non-sports programs. Examples of the latter include Divorce Court, 25 Words or Less, and TMZ.

== Notable on-air staff ==
=== Current ===
- Carrlyn Bathe – Kings Host/Reporter
- Daryl Evans – Kings Analyst
- Jim Fox – Kings Lead Analyst
- Kent French – Angels Live host
- Tony Granato – Kings Analyst
- Mark Gubicza – Los Angeles Angels commentator and Angels Live analyst
- John Kelly – Kings Lead Play-By-Play
- Alec Martinez – Kings Analyst
- Patrick O'Neal (sportscaster) – Kings Host
- Wayne Randazzo – Los Angeles Angels announcer
- Trent Rush – Fill-in Los Angeles Angels announcer
- Tim Salmon – Angels Live analyst
- Terry Smith – fill-in Los Angeles Angels announcer
- Jarret Stoll – Kings Analyst
- Bobby Valentine – Angels Live analyst
- Erica Weston – Los Angeles Angels sideline reporter

=== Former ===
- Garret Anderson – Angels Live analyst
- Alex Faust – Los Angeles Kings play-by-play announcer
- Heidi Androl – Los Angeles Kings reporter
- Michael Cage – former USC commentator and former analyst for Lakers Live and Bruins Live
- Alex Curry – Los Angeles Angels and Los Angeles Kings sideline reporter (home games only), Angels Weekly and Kings Weekly host
- Todd Donoho – Southern California Sports Report anchor
- John Fricke – Southern California Sports Report anchor
- Jack Haley – Lakers Live analyst and Big West basketball commentator
- Chick Hearn – Lakers play-by-play announcer (deceased)
- Rex Hudler – Los Angeles Angels commentator, and analyst for Angels in the Infield and Angels Live
- Carolyn Hughes – anchor of Southern California Sports Report
- Marques Johnson – Pac-12 basketball commentator and (2007) Trojans Live March Madness analyst
- Kevin Kennedy – Major League Baseball analyst
- Mark Langston – 2002 Angels postseason studio analyst
- Stu Lantz – Los Angeles Lakers commentator
- Bill Macdonald – baseball, basketball, football and hockey announcer
- Rory Markas – Angels announcer (deceased)
- José Mota – Los Angeles Angels commentator, reporter and Angels Live analyst
- Adrian Garcia Marquez – Dodgers Live reporter
- Chris McGee – Lakers Live reporter, and high school football announcer
- Marty McSorley – NHL analyst (2006)
- Joel Meyers – Los Angeles Lakers and Big 12 football announcer
- Nick Nickson – Los Angeles Kings announcer
- Bob Miller – Los Angeles Kings announcer, 2000 Inductee into the Hockey Hall of Fame, Recipient of the Foster Hewitt Memorial Award (retired)
- Norm Nixon – Lakers Live analyst
- Petros Papadakis – USC football analyst and Pac-12 football commentator
- Steve Physioc – Los Angeles Angels and Pac-12 basketball announcer
- Lindsay Rhodes – sideline reporter, and anchor of Trojans Live and Southern California Sports Report
- Ted Robinson – Pac-12 basketball announcer
- Victor Rojas – Los Angeles Angels announcer
- Suzy Shuster – Southern California Sports Report anchor
- Matt Stevens – UCLA football analyst
- Paul Sunderland – Pac-12, Big West and Lakers basketball announcer
- Daron Sutton – Los Angeles Angels announcer
- Barry Tompkins – Pac-12 football and basketball announcer
- Rich Waltz – Los Angeles Angels announcer
- Jim Watson – Pac-12 and LA Galaxy announcer, sideline reporter, and anchor of "Dodgers Live" and "Dodgers Dugout"
- Paul Westphal – NBA analyst, USC basketball commentator
- Van Earl Wright – anchor of Southern California Sports Report, Dodgers Dugout (2004) and Kings "Break the Ice" (2004)
- Matt Vasgersian – Los Angeles Angels announcer
- Sean O'Donnell – Kings Live analyst (home games only)
- Jon Rosen – Los Angeles Kings sideline reporter (road games only)
- Maura Sheridan – Angel City FC announcer
- Anna Witte – Angel City FC commentater
- Jeanne Zelasko – Clippers Live host

== Carriage issues ==
=== San Diego County ===
Angels Broadcast Television maintains widespread cable carriage in San Diego County. However, the two major providers in the area, Time Warner Cable and Cox Communications (both later absorbed by Charter Communications and now operate under it’s Spectrum brand), have refused to carry Prime Ticket since its launch in 1997; both cable providers claim that the network has asked for carriage fees they deemed to be too expensive for carriage on their expanded basic tiers. However, Prime Ticket was carried on some former systems that Time Warner Cable acquired in 2006 from Adelphia Communications. Adelphia had added the channel to their lineup in 2001.

On March 17, 2012, as part of a contract signed with FSN to acquire the local cable rights to the San Diego Padres, Fox Sports Networks created a separate regional network for the San Diego market, Fox Sports San Diego (later Bally Sports San Diego). Despite that channel's launch, Bally Sports West remained available on cable providers in the San Diego area; however, Bally Sports San Diego carried some programming (including most live sporting events) from Bally Sports SoCal, which essentially makes striking any carriage agreement for that channel unnecessary.

Because the San Diego Padres hold territorial rights for all of San Diego County, Los Angeles Angels games are blacked out in the county on Angels Broadcast Television regardless of the cable or satellite provider, requiring a subscription to the MLB Extra Innings out-of-market sports package to view those telecasts. All other sports programming, with the exception of Angels baseball games carried on Angels Broadcast Television, is available in San Diego County.

=== Las Vegas Valley ===
Angels Broadcast Television maintains widespread cable carriage in the Las Vegas Valley. On May 23, 2017, it was announced that AT&T SportsNet (then known as Root Sports) had acquired the RSN rights to the Vegas Golden Knights to televise broadcast games in Southern Nevada on AT&T SportsNet Rocky Mountain which started in the 2017-2018 NHL Season.

Because the Vegas Golden Knights hold territorial rights for all of Southern Nevada, Los Angeles Kings games are blacked out in the Las Vegas Valley on Angels Broadcast Television regardless of the cable or satellite provider, requiring a subscription to the NHL Center Ice out-of-market sports package to view those telecasts; a similar policy applied to Anaheim Ducks games when the Bally Sports West and SoCal channels held the rights to the team. All other sports programming, with the exception of Kings hockey games carried on Angels Broadcast Television, is available in Southern Nevada.
