= Victor Rojas =

American baseball executive and former broadcaster

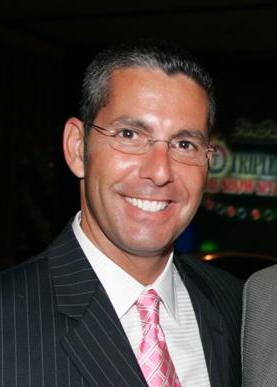
- Rojas in 2006
- Born: Victor Manuel Rojas; February 3, 1968 (age 58); Miami, Florida, U.S.
- Occupation: Head Baseball Coach / ESPN Broadcaster
- Organization: Hastings College / ESPN
- Spouse: Kimberly A. Rojas (m. 2000)
- Children: 3
- Parent: Cookie Rojas
- Sports commentary career
- Teams: Arizona Diamondbacks (2003); Texas Rangers (2004–2008); Los Angeles Angels (2010–2020)
- Genre: Play-by-play
- Sport: MLB

Victor Manuel Rojas (born February 3, 1968) is an American broadcaster, current college baseball coach, and former baseball executive. He formerly served as general manager of the Newark Bears prior to embarking on his MLB broadcasting career and later as president and general manager of the Frisco RoughRiders. Rojas is best known for his time with the Los Angeles Angels as their play-by-play broadcaster from 2010 to 2020.

== Playing career ==
Rojas is the son of former major-league player and manager Cookie Rojas. Born in Miami, Florida and raised in Overland Park, Kansas, Rojas graduated from Blue Valley High School and later attended and played college baseball as a pitcher at Piedmont College (1988) Demorest, Georgia. Rojas played college baseball as a pitcher and catcher at the College of the Desert in Palm Desert, California, and Lewis-Clark State College in Lewiston, Idaho. He pitched in the California Angels minor league system in the early 1990s.

== Coaching career ==
He was a member of the Florida Marlins baseball staff in 1993 serving as the bullpen catcher during the inaugural season. He was the pitching coach for the Rio Grande Valley White Wings of the independent Texas–Louisiana League in 1994.

Rojas was hired as Assistant Head Baseball Coach and Recruiting Coordinator for Ottawa University in Surprise, Arizona in August of 2024. Rojas oversees the offense and catchers for the entire program.

In May of 2025, Rojas was named Head Baseball Coach at Hastings College.

== Broadcasting career ==
=== Early jobs ===
Rojas was a radio and television announcer for the Newark Bears of the independent Atlantic League for two years, and also served as the franchise's general manager. He worked as a broadcaster for MLB Radio in 2002 and 2003 on the All-Star Game and the Arizona Fall League.

He moved up to the radio booth for the Arizona Diamondbacks in 2003.

=== Texas Rangers ===
He joined the Rangers in 2004, replacing Vince Cotroneo (now with the Oakland Athletics). Rojas worked with lead announcer Eric Nadel on all regular-season games and a number of spring training games. He did play-by-play for two pairs of the middle innings (3–4 and 6–7) and provided color commentary for Nadel during the other innings. He has worked multiple Rangers games on television as a fill-in announcer for regular play-by-play man Josh Lewin or color commentator Tom Grieve, and he has also appeared on ESPN.

=== MLB Network ===
Rojas was the first personality to appear on camera when MLB Network launched on January 1, 2009, serving as the first host on Hot Stove (the Network's off-season studio show). Along with Hot Stove, he appeared on MLB Tonight, the network's signature nightly studio program. Rojas also called play-by-play for some of MLB Network's Thursday Night Baseball telecasts.

=== Los Angeles Angels ===
On March 3, 2010, Rojas was named the Los Angeles Angels of Anaheim's TV play-by-play announcer for Fox Sports West, succeeding Rory Markas who died in January and TV play-by-play announcer Steve Physioc and former Major League Baseball player and game analyst Rex Hudler, whose contracts expired after the 2009 season. He partnered with color commentator Mark Gubicza on the broadcasts.

Rojas was hired by TBS to handle play-by-play duties for the 2011 NLDS featuring the Arizona Diamondbacks and the Milwaukee Brewers.

In 2019, Rojas and Gubicza won a Los Angeles Emmy Award for their broadcast of Albert Pujols' 3000th hit.

In November 2020, Rojas revealed that he had interviewed with the Los Angeles Angels for their vacant general manager position. The job eventually went to former Atlanta Braves assistant general manager Perry Minasian.

On January 9, 2021, Rojas announced via Twitter that he would be stepping away from broadcasting to focus on his family and apparel company. Matt Vasgersian would take Rojas' spot.

=== ESPN (College Baseball) ===
Since early 2022, Rojas has served as play-by-play announcer for ESPN’s coverage of Division I Baseball across all platforms. He has called regular season games in the ACC, SEC, and Big XII. In addition to his regular season duties, Rojas has served as play-by-play announcer for the Big XII Baseball Tournament the last two years and has worked prominent Regional and Super-Regionals for the network.

==== Play calls ====
- "Oppo taco": Opposite field home run
- "Three-run jimmy jack": Three-run home run
- "Big fly": A home run
- "Light that baby up!": The call at the final out of an Angels win, referring to the halo on the 230-foot tall A outside of Angel Stadium that lights up when the Angels win.
- "Drive home safely!": When the Angels have a walk-off win.
- "Grand salami time!": When the Angels hit a grand slam.
- ”Big fly, Ohtani-san!”: Home run call for Japanese player Shohei Ohtani, making use of the Japanese honorific "san"

== Executive career ==
Rojas served as Assistant General Manager and later General Manager of the Newark Bears of the independent Atlantic League from 2001-2002. In addition to his front office duties, Rojas served as the play-by-play announcer for Bears games which aired on Seton Hall University’s radio station.

On January 11, 2021, after 18 years as an MLB announcer, it was announced that Rojas had been hired by Texas Rangers Double-A affiliate Frisco RoughRiders as their president and general manager, a position he held until September 2022.

== Personal life ==
Rojas and his wife, Kim have three children. He and his family started a baseball apparel business in 2019 called Big Fly Gear. His father Cookie was an MLB player for 16 seasons and a manager for two. His brother Mike is a long time Minor and Major league manager and coach across many different levels and is currently coaching in Mexico.

Rojas and his family currently reside in Nebraska.
