= Matt Vasgersian =

American sportscaster (born 1967)

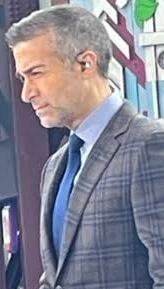
- Vasgersian in 2022
- Born: Matthew E. Vasgerdsian; September 28, 1967 (age 59); Berkeley, California, U.S.
- Education: University of Southern California
- Occupation: Sportscaster
- Years active: 1997–present
- Sports commentary career
- Teams: Milwaukee Brewers (1997–2001); San Diego Padres (2002–2008); Los Angeles Angels (2021–2025)
- Genre: Play-by-play
- Sport: Major League Baseball
- Employer: NBC Sports (2001–present); Fox Sports (2005–2017; 2022–present); MLB Network (2009–present); ABC and ESPN (2018–2021); Netflix (2026–present)

Matthew E. Vasgersian (né Vasgerdsian; /væˈskɜːrdʒɪn/ va-SKUR-jin; born September 28, 1967) is an American sportscaster and television host who is a studio host for MLB Network and Fox Sports, as well as a play-by-play announcer for MLB Network, MLB on Netflix and MLB on NBC. In the past, he has served as an announcer for Fox Sports' National Football League and Major League Baseball coverage, ESPN's coverage of Major League Baseball, NBC Sports' coverage of the Olympic Games, NBC Sports' coverage of the original XFL, and was a commentator for the MLB: The Show video game series. He formerly called play-by-play for the Milwaukee Brewers, San Diego Padres and Los Angeles Angels.

== Early life ==
Vasgersian was born in Berkeley, California, and raised in nearby Moraga. He is of Armenian descent. He began career as a child actor before graduating from the University of Southern California in 1989 with a degree in communications. While a student at USC, he appeared on the television programs The New Dating Game and Supermarket Sweep.

== Career ==
=== Initial baseball work ===
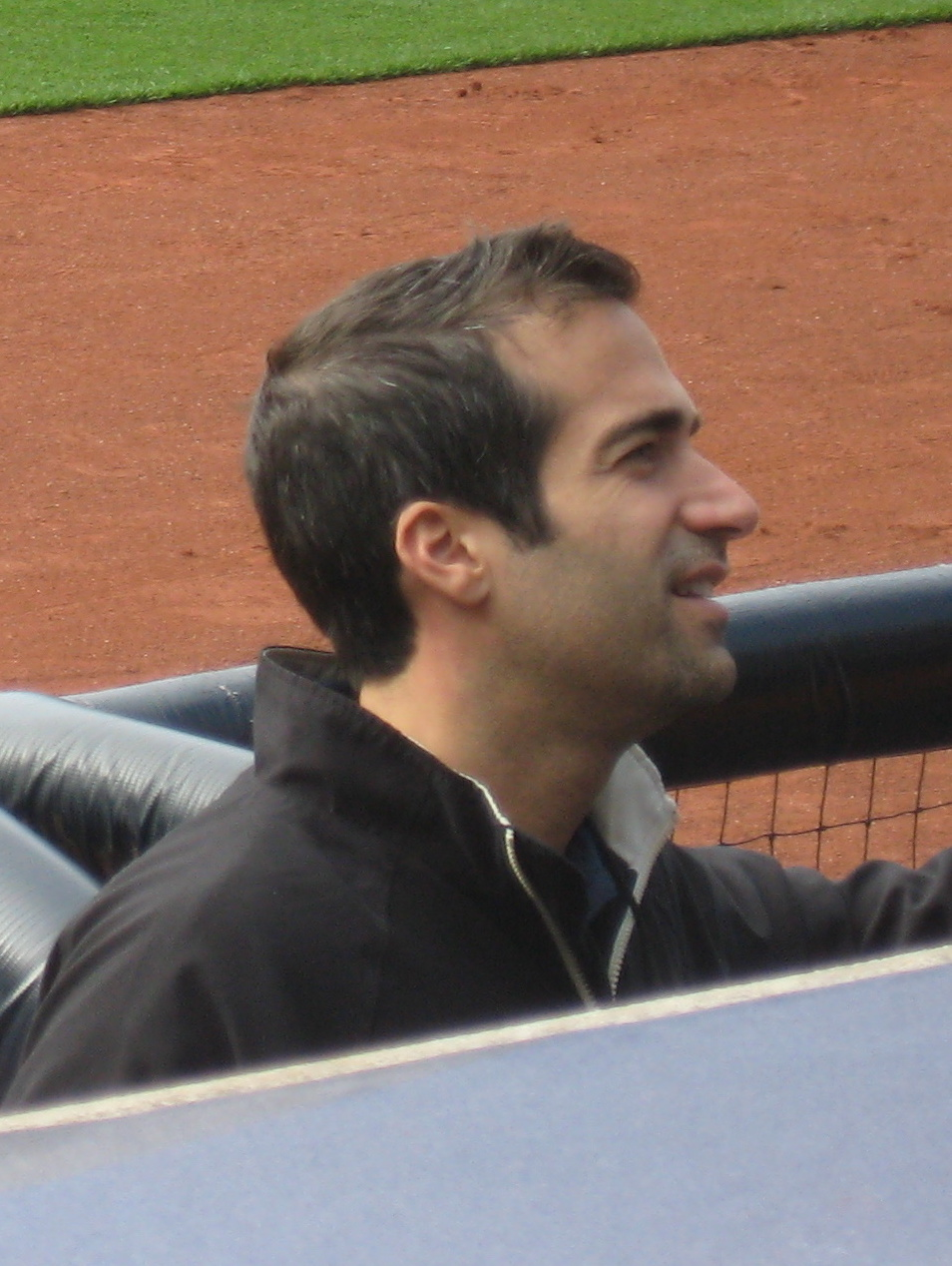
Vasgersian in the dugout at Petco Park before a 2008 Padres game

Vasgersian has worked in baseball since 1991, starting with a six-year stint in the Minor Leagues as a play-by-play announcer. He began his career as a sportscaster with the Chicago Cubs Rookie league affiliate in Huntington, West Virginia on radio station WKEE-AM 800 and was the voice of the High Desert Mavericks (San Diego Padres affiliate) on radio station KAPL. He moved up the minor league baseball ranks over the next several years, working for various clubs in a number of different organizations, including the Syracuse Chiefs in 1995, and ending with the Triple–A Tucson Toros in 1996.

Vasgersian was 29 years old when he became the play-by-play voice for the Milwaukee Brewers where he worked from 1997 through 2001. He later worked in the same role for the San Diego Padres from 2002 through 2008. Vasgersian was with the Padres for seven seasons when it was announced he would be joining MLB Network.

On November 1, 2008, during a broadcast of the San Diego CIF High School Football Game of the Week, Channel 4 announced that Vasgersian would not be returning as Padres announcer for the 2009 season, having chosen to pursue other opportunities. Later that week, it was reported that Vasgersian had signed a deal with MLB Network to become the network's first studio host.

=== Fox Sports ===
Vasgersian joined Fox Sports in 2006. From 2006 through 2008, Vasgersian worked on Fox NFL telecasts, teaming with J. C. Pearson on the network's #6 broadcast team. In previous years, he had done select games for the network. Vasgersian's Fox football resume included calling BCS games for the network, working the Orange Bowl in 2007 and the Fiesta Bowl 2008 and 2009. Starting in 2007, he also worked on Fox MLB telecasts of the Game of the Week, teaming with a variety of analysts on the network's #3 broadcast crew. In 2012, he began hosting the MLB pregame show, though he still occasionally called games on a fill-in basis. In 2014, he was moved back to the broadcast booth, working with John Smoltz on one of the network's #2 broadcast teams (a role the pair splits with Thom Brennaman and Eric Karros). In this role, he and Smoltz worked on postseason telecasts during the Division Series. In 2015, Vasgersian and Smoltz called their first World Series for MLB International. In 2016, Smoltz became lead game analyst at Fox and Buck Martinez became Vasgersian's new partner for the international broadcast of the World Series.

Vasgersian returned to Fox in 2022 where he fills in for Kevin Burkhardt as studio host during the MLB postseason when Burkhardt is on his NFL assignments.

=== MLB Network ===
Vasgersian has been a studio host at MLB Network since its debut on January 1, 2009, appearing regularly in-studio and on-site at the All-Star Game and World Series on MLB Tonight, the network's Emmy Award-winning live nightly studio show, as well as "Quick Pitch," "The Rundown," the offseason studio show "Hot Stove," MLB Network's Spring Training series 30 Clubs in 30 Days, and MLB Network's first-ever game show Baseball IQ. Throughout the MLB regular season, Vasgersian calls play-by-play for the MLB Network Showcase game package. He called Game 2 of the 2012 ALDS between the Detroit Tigers and the Oakland Athletics on October 7.

Vasgersian and Jim Kaat called Game 3 of the 2013 American League Division Series, also between the Detroit Tigers and the Oakland Athletics on October 7 as well. From 2012 to 2014, when he hosted Fox's MLB pregame, Vasgersian did not host programming on MLB Network during the All-Star Game and the postseason.

Vasgersian became a co-host, with Lauren Shehadi and Mark DeRosa, of MLB Network's show MLB Central, which debuted on April 6, 2015. Vasgersian was later replaced on that program by Robert Flores. Vasgersian also did commentary for MLB Network's coverage of the All-Star Game in 2015.

In April 2022, MLB Network announced that Vasgersian would be the host of a new daytime sports betting show titled Pregame Spread.

=== ESPN ===
On January 23, 2018, it was announced that Vasgersian would become the new play-by-play voice for ESPN's Sunday Night Baseball beginning in the 2018 season, teaming with Alex Rodriguez, while continuing his role at MLB Network. Vasgersian succeeded Dan Shulman, who moved to Sportsnet to call Toronto Blue Jays games for the 2019 season. Shulman still remains with ESPN however.

On October 6, 2021, Vasgersian left ESPN to focus on his other roles with MLB Network and on Angels’ regional telecasts. Vasgersian's final game for ESPN was the 2021 American League Wild Card Game, where the Red Sox beat the Yankees.

=== Los Angeles Angels ===
On March 11, 2021, it was announced that Vasgersian would become the new play-by-play voice for the Los Angeles Angels' telecasts on Bally Sports West, taking over for former broadcaster Victor Rojas who left to pursue a front-office career. He joined a three-man booth with José Mota and Mark Gubicza, while continuing his roles on MLB Network. Daron Sutton was selected as the backup play-by-play announcer for games Vasgersian was unable to call due to his obligations to the national networks. Sutton was replaced by Rich Waltz as Vasgersian's backup midway through the 2021 season.

Vasgersian returned to the Angels' booth for the 2022 season alongside Gubicza and new sideline reporter Erica Weston with more availability due to his October 2021 departure from ESPN. As a result, Waltz was relieved of his secondary play-by-play duties and Angels Live host Patrick O'Neal called games in Vasgersian's future MLB Network-related absences. Vasgersian called most of his Angels broadcasts remotely from the MLB Network studios in Secaucus, New Jersey, as he did in 2021.

For the 2023 season, Vasgersian was replaced as lead play-by-play commentator by Wayne Randazzo, with Vasgersian moved to a secondary play-by-play role due to his work with MLB Network.

=== Other ventures ===
Vasgersian first gained national exposure doing play-by-play for the XFL in 2001. Vasgersian's time with the league was tense. Following the inaugural telecast in which he quipped, "I feel uncomfortable" after a suggestive shot of the cheerleaders, Vince McMahon personally demoted him and replaced him with wrestling announcer and former Atlanta Falcons play-by-play man Jim Ross. At NBC's behest, Vasgersian returned to the first team broadcast halfway through the season.

He has hosted several TV shows, including the game show Sports Geniuses (2000), Game Show Network's World Series of Blackjack (2004), and Celebrity Blackjack (2004), the National Heads-Up Poker Championship on NBC and the first season grand final of Poker Superstars Invitational Tournament. He has also emceed various sports specials and other programs, such as the International World Championships of Rock Paper Scissors (2004).

Vasgersian also called USC Trojans men's basketball for FSN West from 2004 to 2006.

He has also worked on an Ultimate Fighting Championship broadcast, filling in for Mike Goldberg, the usual announcer. Goldberg was working on Fox Sports Net's college football telecast on the night of UFC 56, so Vasgersian provided play-by-play alongside regular color commentator Joe Rogan.

Vasgersian was the commentator in every installment of MLB: The Show since its debut in 2006 until his last appearance in MLB The Show 21. He worked with Dave Campbell, Rex Hudler, Eric Karros, Steve Lyons, Harold Reynolds, Dan Plesac and Mark DeRosa. He was replaced by Jon Sciambi and Chris Singleton for MLB The Show 22. In addition to his work on MLB: The Show, Vasgersian was the "host" for several PS1 Sony sports titles in the late 1990s and early 2000s, specifically for 989 Studios sports games.

He has contributed to NBC Sports' coverage of several Olympic Games, calling baseball and softball in the 2004 Summer Games, ski jumping in the 2006 and 2010 Winter Games, and freestyle skiing in the 2014 Winter Games. He also hosted the 2008 Summer Games coverage on USA Network.

Vasgersian is also a regular featured commentator on the Dave & Carole morning show on WKLH 96.5 FM in Milwaukee. His affiliation with the Dave and Carole Morning Show led him to a side career in music as he performed regularly as a lead vocalist with kb'smidlifecrisis, a rock band fronted by Dave and Carole sidekick Kevin "KB" Brandt. Vasgersian was the host of the MLB on Fox pregame show from 2012 to 2014, before he was replaced by Kevin Burkhardt after the 2013 season, although he would occasionally fill for him during the MLB postseason since 2022 when Burkhardt is on his NFL assignment.

He is also a recurring satirical commentator for Hamish and Andy's Gap Year.

Vasgersian is the play-by-play voice for MLB International replacing Gary Thorne starting with the 2015 MLB All-Star Game and the World Series for Canadian and overseas fans.

Sporting positions
Preceded by Dan Shulman	Sunday Night Baseball play-by-play announcer 2018–2021	Succeeded by Karl Ravech
Preceded by Gary Thorne	Lead MLB International play-by-play announcer 2015–present	Succeeded by Incumbent
