= Gary Johnson (outfielder) =

American baseball player (born 1975)

- Outfielder
- Born: October 29, 1975 (age 50); Palo Alto, California, U.S.
- Batted: Left Threw: Left

MLB debut
- April 26, 2003, for the Anaheim Angels

Last MLB appearance
- May 8, 2003, for the Anaheim Angels

MLB statistics (through Career)
- Batting average: .375
- Home runs: 0
- Runs batted in: 0
- Stats at Baseball Reference

Teams
- Los Angeles Angels (2003)

Gerald Clyde "Gary" Johnson (born October 29, 1975) is an American former professional baseball player who played one season for the Anaheim Angels of Major League Baseball.
