= Greg Jones (pitcher) =

American baseball player (born 1976)

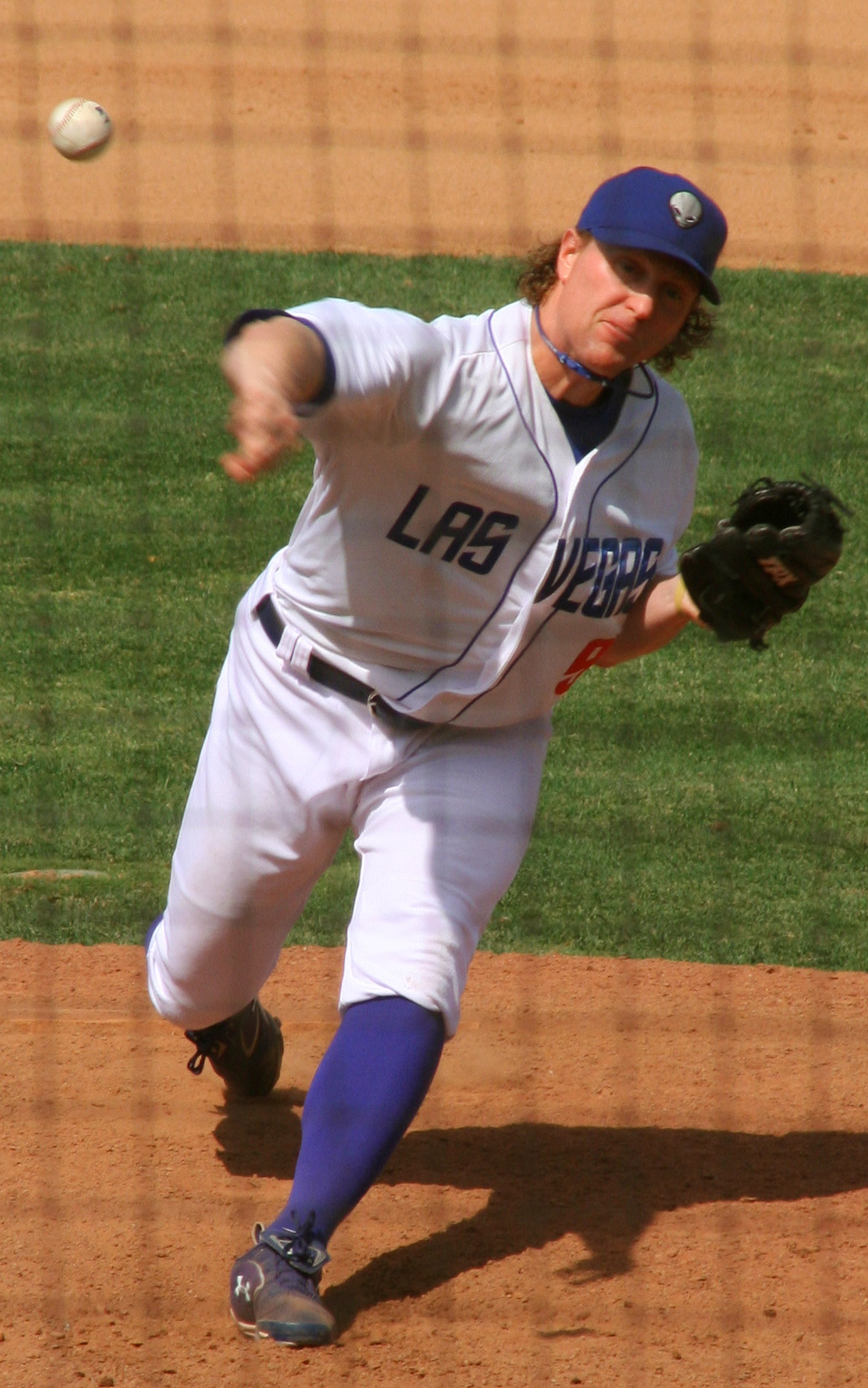
- Jones with the Las Vegas 51s in 2008
- Relief pitcher
- Born: November 15, 1976 (age 48); Clearwater, Florida, U.S.
- Batted: Right Threw: Right

MLB debut
- July 30, 2003, for the Anaheim Angels

Last MLB appearance
- August 18, 2007, for the Los Angeles Angels of Anaheim

MLB statistics
- Win–loss record: 0-0
- Earned run average: 5.48
- Strikeouts: 40
- Stats at Baseball Reference

Teams
- Los Angeles Angels of Anaheim (2003, 2005–2007)

Greg Alan Jones (born November 15, 1976) is an American former professional baseball pitcher. He played in Major League Baseball (MLB) for the Los Angeles Angels of Anaheim.

== Amateur career ==
Jones attended Seminole High School in Seminole, Florida. On June 4, 1996, he was drafted by the California Angels in the 42nd round of the 1996 MLB draft.

== Professional career ==
Jones made his MLB debut on July 30, 2003 pitching for the Anaheim Angels. He appeared in 38 games and pitched 47.2 innings with an ERA of 5.48 in four seasons with the Angels. However, Jones remained in the Angels organization for eleven years from 1997 to 2007 having played the majority of his career in their minor league system.

On December 12, 2007, Jones signed a minor league contract with an invitation to spring training with the Los Angeles Dodgers and was assigned to play for the Triple-A Las Vegas 51s. He was released by the Dodgers on July 6, 2008.

In March 2009, he signed a minor league contract with the Cleveland Indians.
