= Ben Baumer =

American statistician and sabermetrician

Benjamin Baumer
- Born: Northampton, Massachusetts, U.S.
- Citizenship: American
- Education: Wesleyan University (BA); University of California, San Diego (MA); City University of New York (PhD)
- Spouse: Cory Mescon
- Scientific career
- Fields: Statistics; Data science; R (programming language)
- Workplaces: Smith College
- Thesis: (2012)

Benjamin Strong Baumer is a statistician and sabermetrician. He is a professor of statistical and data sciences at Smith College, and was formerly the statistical analyst for the New York Mets.

== Life ==
Baumer grew up in Northampton, Massachusetts. His parents are Polly Baumer and Don Baumer, a former magazine owner and professor of government at Smith College.

Baumer received a Bachelor of Arts in economics from Wesleyan University, and his masters in applied mathematics from the University of California, San Diego. He completed a PhD at the City University of New York.

Baumer is married to Cory Mescon, a public defender.

== Work ==
Baumer is known for his work in sabermetrics, including the book The Sabermetric Revolution: Assessing the Growth of Analytics in Baseball with Andrew Zimbalist. He was the statistical analyst for the New York Mets for eight years, between 2004-2012. This was shortly after the publication of Moneyball, so the use of statistical analysis in baseball was still a new field.

Since leaving the Mets, Baumer has been a professor at Smith College. Upon arrival at Smith, he taught in the mathematics department. He was instrumental in the development of Smith's program in statistical and data sciences, and is now appointed in that program. The program is one of the first undergraduate majors in data science in the United States, and the first at a women's college. Baumer is also a member of the advisory board for the MassMutual data science initiative, a joint effort with Smith College, Mount Holyoke College, and MassMutual.

Baumer has written a textbook for use in data science courses, Modern Data Science with R. He has several highly cited papers on pedagogical techniques for undergraduate data science education. He has taught online data science courses for DataCamp. He is a member of the national organizing committee for DataFest, a weekend-long data hackathon for undergraduate students. Baumer has also organized the FiveCollege Data Fest since 2014.

He is the author of several R packages, including openWAR, a package for analyzing baseball data, and etl, a package for Extract, Transform, Load operations on medium data.

== Awards ==
Baumer received the 2016 Contemporary Baseball Analysis Award. His project, The Great Analytics Rankings, was nominated for a 2015 EPPY award. He was elected to the 2025 class of Fellows of the American Statistical Association.

== Bibliography ==
- Baumer, Ben; Zimbalist, Andrew (2013). The Sabermetric Revolution: Assessing the Growth of Analytics in Baseball. University of Pennsylvania Press. Archived from the original on March 5, 2014. ISBN 9780812223392.
- Baumer, Benjamin S.; Kaplan, Daniel; Horton, Nicholas (2021). Modern Data Science with R (2 ed.). Chapman and Hall/CRC. ISBN 9780367191498.
- Albert, Jim; Marchi, Max; Baumer, Benjamin S. (2019). Analyzing Baseball Data with R, Second Edition. Chapman and Hall/CRC. ISBN 9780815353515.
