= Spectrum SportsNet LA =

Spectrum SportsNet LA Spectrum Deportes LA
- Country: United States
- Broadcast area: Southern California; Central California; San Joaquin Valley; Las Vegas Valley; Hawaii; Nationwide (via satellite)
- Headquarters: El Segundo, California

Programming
- Languages: English; Spanish; Korean (via SAP)
- Picture format: 1080i (HDTV); 480i (SDTV)

Ownership
- Owner: Guggenheim Partners (50%); Charter Communications (50%)
- Sister channels: Spectrum SportsNet

History
- Launched: February 25, 2014; 12 years ago
- Former names: Time Warner Cable SportsNet LA (2014–2016)

Links
- Website: www.sportsnetla.com

Availability

Streaming media
- DirecTV Stream: Internet Protocol television
- FuboTV: Internet Protocol Television

Spectrum SportsNet LA and Spectrum Deportes LA (otherwise known as simply SportsNet LA and Deportes LA and originally known as Time Warner Cable SportsNet LA) is an American regional sports network jointly owned by the controlling owner of the Los Angeles Dodgers Major League Baseball team and Charter Communications through its acquisition of Time Warner Cable in May 2016. The channel's programming is devoted completely to the Dodgers, and includes coverage of all Dodgers games not being exclusively televised by MLB's national television partners, along with news, interview, and documentary programming focusing on the team.

The channel, which launched on February 25, 2014, was the result of a 25-year deal with Time Warner Cable reached in January 2013, valued at $8.35 billion, succeeding Prime Ticket as the regional rights holder for the team. The channel is one of three regional sports networks owned by Charter Communications serving the Los Angeles region.

Until April 2020 when AT&T, owner of DirecTV, came to terms with Charter, SportsNet LA reached less than half the Southern California market. Disputes in negotiations included the cost of the channel and the requirement that SportsNet LA be carried with other mainstream premium channels rather than in a separate sports tier or on an "a la carte" basis.

== History ==
In late 2012, Fox Sports' exclusive period for negotiating a new broadcast deal with the Dodgers ended. Reports published at that time indicated that the team was negotiating with other potential broadcasters, such as the recently established Time Warner Cable SportsNet, and contemplating forming an in-house network with Dick Clark Productions, a television production company recently purchased by the Dodgers' new parent company, Guggenheim Partners.

On January 22, 2013, the Los Angeles Times reported that Time Warner Cable had signed a deal to partner with the Dodgers to form a new regional sports network, which would be majority-owned by the team. On January 28, the Dodgers and Time Warner Cable signed a 25-year broadcast agreement valued at $8.35 billion, subject to the approval of Major League Baseball, which would see the establishment of a new channel known as SportsNet LA. The deal ended long-standing broadcast partnerships with Fox Sports West, which had aired Dodgers games on its Prime Ticket channel since 1997; and with KCAL-TV, an independent station which had been the Dodgers' over-the-air broadcast television outlet since 2006. TWC's winning bid exceeded Fox's bid by $2 billion and was worth $210 million for the inaugural 2014 season or $1.5 million a game. That amount exceeded the revenues from Prime Ticket and KCAL-TV by more than four times. The agreement increased the number of games aired: nearly 100 games were carried in 2014 compared with the 49 games aired by Prime Ticket in 2013.

Following the approval of the Dodgers' television deal, the team announced on January 16, 2014, that SportsNet LA would launch on February 25, the eve of spring training, and that all of the Dodgers' spring training games would be televised by the new channel. At least 75 games broadcast by the channel in the 2014 season were simulcast in Spanish; the channel plans to televise all its games in Spanish in the future. While the channel is not directly branded with the Dodgers' name, its logo incorporates the team's interlocking "LA" insignia; team co-owner Todd Boehly stated that the decision was "something [Time Warner Cable] thought was really valuable to their brand. We have the flexibility to sit down and evolve the name over time."

== Programming ==
Team president Stan Kasten described Sportsnet LA as a "Dodger-only channel with Dodger-only content 24/7", featuring live game coverage and original series focusing on aspects of the team. The initial program lineup included:

- Access SportsNet: Dodgers — the channel's flagship news and information program, airing nightly and as a pre- and post-game show.
- Leadoff LA — analysis of the team by Sportsnet LA personalities and experts, batting practice coverage, and viewer interaction through social media.
- Dodgers Clubhouse — airs weekly during the season with in-depth features on the team and its players, and interviews with the team's manager.
- Backstage: Dodgers — airs weekly during the season, featuring a behind-the-scenes perspective on the Dodgers' games, players, and staff.
- Talkin' Blue — panel discussions featuring Dodgers' players and staff.
- Connected With... — profiles and interviews of Dodgers players and staff, and documentaries.
- Timeless Dodgers — classic Dodgers games.
- Larry King at Bat — an interview program hosted by long-time television personality and avid Dodgers fan Larry King
- Dodgers Squeeze Play — condensed one-hour encores of Dodgers games.

As part of cutbacks across TWC's Los Angeles regional sports networks due to low viewership, Larry King at Bat and Dodgers Clubhouse were cancelled in September 2015. The following February, the channel announced it would reduce the number of spring training games it broadcasts to 16, down from 31 in 2015 and 22 in its debut year.

In 2025, Spectrum SportsNet LA reached an agreement with the Oklahoma City Comets, the Dodgers Triple A affiliate, to air 13 games.

== Talent ==
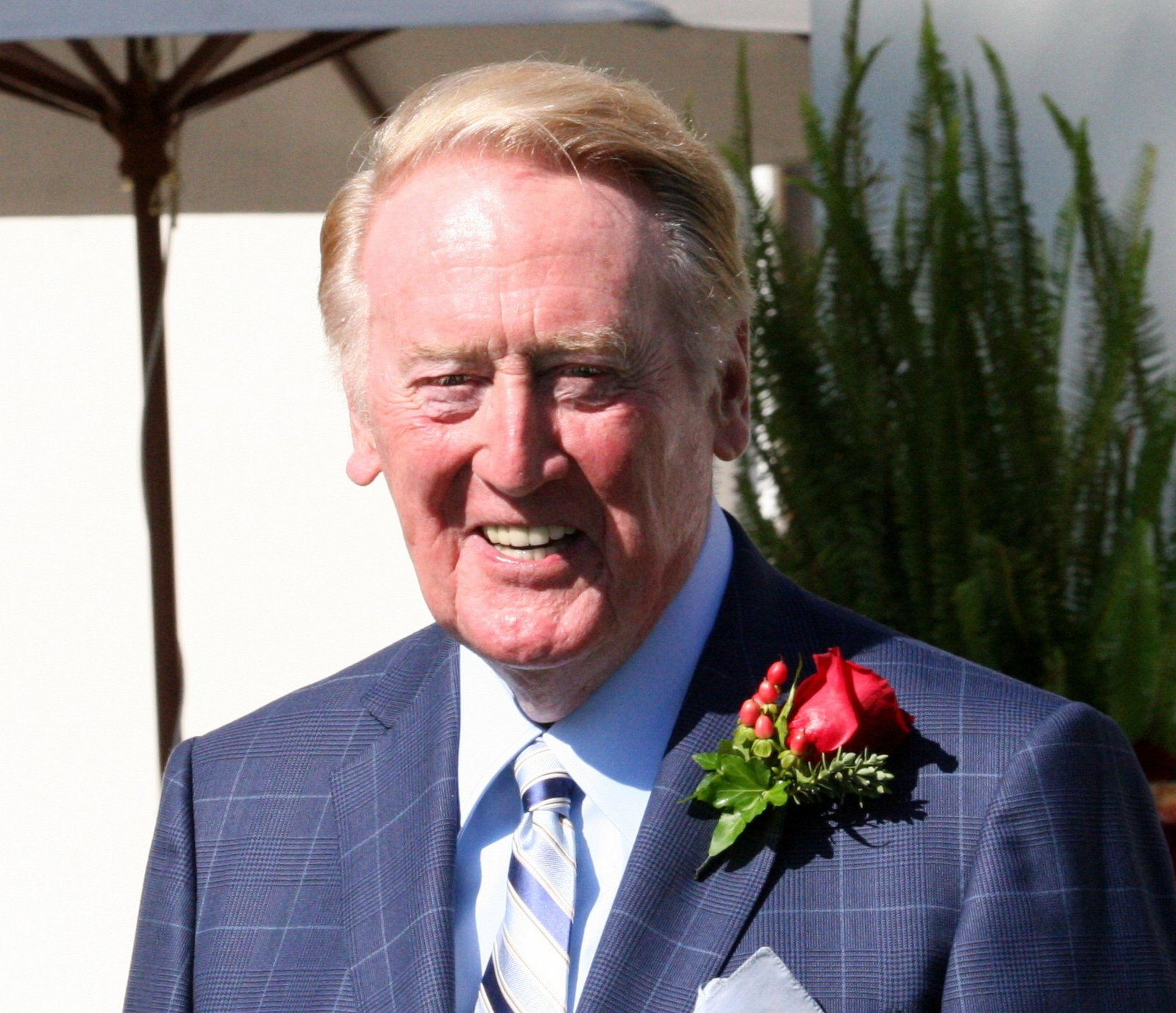
Long-time sportscaster Vin Scully continued his tenure as voice of the Dodgers on SportsNet LA until his 2016 retirement.

=== Current ===
- Joe Davis (lead play-by-play)
- Orel Hershiser (lead color commentary and alternate studio commentary)
- Kirsten Watson (lead field reporter, on-site studio host)
- John Hartung (lead studio/on-site host)
- Jerry Hairston Jr. (lead studio commentary)
- Nomar Garciaparra (lead studio commentary and alternate color commentary)
- Stephen Nelson (fill-in play-by-play)
- Tim Neverett (fill-in play-by-play)
- Jessica Mendoza (alternate color commentary)
- Eric Karros (alternate color commentary)
- Dontrelle Willis (alternate studio commentary and color commentary)
- David Vassegh (fill-in field reporter)
- Taylor Schaub (sports MMJ)
- José Mota (fill-in field reporter and alternate studio commentary; currently Mota serves as a Spanish color commentator for KTNQ 1020 AM, and an English color commentator for AM 570 LA Sports)
- Kelvin Washington (alternate studio host)
- Allie Clifton (alternate studio host)
- Adrián González (alternate studio commentary)
- J.P. Hoornstra (alternate studio commentary)
- James Loney (alternate studio commentary)

=== Former ===
- Vin Scully (lead play-by-play; deceased)
- Charley Steiner (alternate play-by-play; still calls games on radio)
- Alanna Rizzo (lead field reporter, alternate studio host; now back with MLB Network)
- Ned Colletti (studio commentary)
- Daron Sutton (fill-in play-by-play)

As of the 2023 season, Dodgers games on SportsNet LA are called by Joe Davis on play-by-play, and Orel Hershiser on color. Kirsten Watson, formerly of sister station Spectrum SportsNet, is the lead field reporter and fills in as studio host for some games. Former baseball players Nomar Garciaparra and Jerry Hairston Jr. are also part of the pre and post-game broadcasts. Garciaparra will occasionally join Davis and Hershiser in the booth, or fill in for Hershiser on some games, with Stephen Nelson or Tim Neverett filling in for Davis whenever he is on assignment for Fox Sports. Former KABC-TV anchor John Hartung serves as a studio host, with Spectrum News 1 anchor Kelvin Washington and Lakers studio host Allie Clifton filling in on occasions. ESPN’s Jessica Mendoza and Eric Karros, a colleague of Davis at Fox, joined SportsNet LA in 2022 as alternate color commentators. Dontrelle Willis, another colleague of Davis, Adrián González, and Jose Mota, longtime member of the rival Los Angeles Angels broadcast team, also joined as studio analysts. Willis also fills-in for Hershiser on select road games, and Mota is also part of the Dodgers’ Spanish language broadcast team on radio. David Vassegh will occasionally fill-in for Watson whenever she is on duty for another assignment.

From SportsNet LA's inaugural season through 2016, Hall of Fame broadcaster Vin Scully retained his traditional role as solo commentator for Dodgers games in California and Arizona. The 2014 MLB season marked his 65th as a baseball commentator. Games not called by Scully were called by Charley Steiner (play-by-play) and Orel Hershiser (color commentary). Scully retired at the conclusion of the 2016 Los Angeles Dodgers season. The following season, he was succeeded by Joe Davis; he was phased into the role by performing play-by-play for 52 road games during the 2016 season, splitting with Steiner the games not being called by Scully that season. Steiner continues to serve as an alternate play-by-play announcer if Davis is unable to work a game due to a Fox Sports assignment. Alanna Rizzo had been the lead field reporter and alternate studio host since the network's launch. Rizzo left after the 2020 season for personal reasons.

For the 2014 season, SportsNet LA began to carry an expanded schedule of dedicated Spanish-language broadcasts of Dodgers games on a special feed of the network. For the 2014 season, 75 games were broadcast in Spanish, and called by Jorge Jarrín (son of the team's long-time Spanish radio voice Jaime Jarrin) and Manny Mota. As of the 2015 season, all Dodgers games broadcast by SportsNet LA are available in Spanish; at this time, Jorge moved to the Spanish-language radio broadcasts with his father, while Pepe Yniguez and Fernando Valenzuela moved from radio to television alongside Mota.

Also in 2014, SportsNet LA launched Korean-language broadcasts carried on SAP, called by Richard Choi and Chong Ho Yim. The Dodgers were the first MLB team to offer a Korean-language broadcast for all of its games.

== Carriage ==
Until April 2020 when AT&T agreed to carry the network, SportsNet LA had never been available to the majority of households in its service area. Carriage was most limited in the channel's inaugural 2014 season, when it was carried by Time Warner Cable systems in Los Angeles, Bright House Networks' system in Bakersfield, and Champion Broadband serving a small portion of the San Gabriel Valley. Together, these distributors covered only 30% of the market, leaving the remaining 70% without the channel. Coverage rose when Charter Communications added SportsNet LA in June 2015, but remained under 50 percent: about 1.8 million homes. DirecTV, later owned by AT&T, was the largest unsigned distributor. Charter acquired TWC in May 2016.

On April 1, 2020, AT&T came to terms with Charter after a seven-year impasse (sufficiently long that some fans on social media believed the announcement was an April Fool's prank), reaching a multi-year deal to carry SportsNet LA on its video platforms, including AT&T TV/AT&T TV Now, DirecTV and U-Verse. The agreement brought the number of households able to view SportsNet LA to about 3 million. According to a Los Angeles Times analysis, DirecTV had been "hemorrhaging customers" and viewed sports as one of the few remaining reasons for customers to pay at least $100 a month for a conventional pay-TV subscription. "Without sports, millions of additional consumers probably would cut the pay-TV cord". For Charter, the deal helped stem annual losses of about $150 million on the SportsNet LA contract.

Following Charter's acquisition of Cox Communications in August 2026, the channel would become available on their Orange County, Palos Verdes, Santa Barbara and Las Vegas systems to customers on the Contour Preferred package or higher.

The channel remains in an impasse with other Southern California providers, including DISH.

=== Factors ===
The carriage dispute is emblematic of the growing tension between high-fee sports channels and content distributors. The latter have grown concerned over losing subscribers who resent paying for sports channels they don't watch. Early on, DirecTV offered to carry the channel on an "a la carte" basis, rather than part of a package, at whatever monthly fee TWC set. That scheme would have avoided passing the cost to DirecTV's entire base of subscribers, including those not interested in the channel. TWC responded by noting that bundled regional sports channels have been an industry standard, one that DirecTV itself adheres to in other markets.

Another factor, one specific to Los Angeles, was the large number of regional sports channels in the area, which has resulted in higher subscriber costs than in other metropolitan regions. Those channels include Spectrum SportsNet (formerly Time Warner Cable SportsNet), whose ratings dropped along with the flagging performance of its most visible team, the Los Angeles Lakers.

In addition, some industry observers believed that Comcast, which was trying to acquire Time Warner Cable, would write off losses on the Dodgers' contract and offer distributors a better deal. That speculation lowered the signing incentive in 2014. Comcast withdrew the acquisition proposal on April 24, 2015. In turn, Charter Communications acquired Time Warner Cable on May 26, 2015. As a result, Charter added SportsNet LA on June 9, making the network available to nearly 300,000 additional subscribers in the Los Angeles region.

=== Proposed distribution fees ===
In 2014, Time Warner Cable reportedly asked other distributors for an estimated $4.90 monthly fee per household, with carriage fees increasing over the length of the contract. In March 2016, TWC attempted to break the stalemate by reducing the fee for the upcoming season by about 30 percent: about $3.50 per household, according to an estimate by the analyst firm SNL Kagan. A follow-up offer extended the period to six years, with fees comparable to DirecTV's own Seattle-based regional sports channel, Root Sports Northwest, estimated at $3.84 per household. Both pre-season offers were rejected before opening day.

In September 2016, after acquiring TWC, Charter indicated it would price the 2017 season above $4.50. “[The previous] deal is no longer on the table—it didn't work,” said Charter Chief Executive Thomas Rutledge to the Los Angeles Times. “We would love to sell the channel to others, but no one has bought it—and we are not giving it away. So if consumers want the Dodger channel, they'll need to subscribe to us to get it.”

=== Consequences ===
Some industry observers saw TWC's inability to resell the channel as having industry-wide consequences. Midway through the channel's 2014 inaugural season, Los Angeles Times business reporter Joe Flint called the standoff a potentially "definitive moment for the world of sports programming, as the industry realizes that exorbitantly priced television deals can backfire." Four years later, Kagen sports analyst Adam Gajo said that the carriage dispute challenged the assumption that subscribers would absorb almost any cost to see their teams play. He called SportsNet LA a "turning point” for teams, forcing them to consider whether higher revenues from distributors might sacrifice the next generation of fans.

In its first two baseball seasons, Time Warner Cable lost more than $100 million a year on SportsNet LA due to the channel's limited distribution. TWC Sports President David B. Rone, who was instrumental in the company's foray into regional sports programming, departed TWC in October 2015.

By June 2017, the SportsNet LA viewership for Dodger games had dropped 49% from 2013, shifting from 154,000 households to 79,000. Television viewership for the Dodgers' regional rivals, the Los Angeles Angels, initially soared to 107,000 households per game in 2014. But that number dropped over the 2015 and 2016 seasons, averaging just 47,000 households in the first few months of the 2017 season, even though the games are broadcast on all major carriers.

In a bid to increase viewership, SportsNet LA began to syndicate selected Dodgers games to broadcast television stations. In 2014 and 2016, the Dodgers' final six regular season games were shown on KDOC-TV and KTLA. The latter season included Vin Scully's final games before his retirement. In 2017, 10 early-season games aired on KTLA, which, together with SportsNet LA, drew an average 378,000 viewers per game, about five times the size of the usual audience. The station broadcast five early-season games in 2018 and ten in 2019.

=== DirecTV collusion lawsuit ===
On November 2, 2016, the United States Department of Justice sued DirecTV and its corporate successor, AT&T Inc., alleging the company colluded with its competitors to prevent SportsNet LA from being carried more widely. The parties settled the following March, resulting in stricter operating guidelines for AT&T, but no break in the negotiating stalemate.

The DOJ alleged that DirecTV had "unlawfully exchanged competitively-sensitive information" with AT&T (prior to its acquisition of DirecTV), Charter, and Cox Communications surrounding their negotiations and plans to carry SportsNet LA, in order to "obtain bargaining leverage and to reduce the risk that they would lose subscribers if they decided not to carry the channel but a competitor chose to do so."

AT&T general counsel David McAtee responded to the claims, stating that the company made its decision "independently, legally and only after thorough negotiations with the content owner”, and argued that no other provider carried the channel because they did not want to pass TWC's "inflated prices" for the channel on to consumers.

The March 2017 settlement required AT&T to better ensure that its employees maintain confidentiality during contract negotiations. But the state of those negotiations remained unchanged as AT&T was not required to make any bargaining concessions.

=== Over-the-air ===
Due to the lack of cable carriage of Spectrum SportsNet, in September 2014 the network announced an agreement with over-the-air broadcast station KDOC-TV to simulcast 6 games. A similar agreement was announced in September 2016 with KTLA. The 2016 games were some of last for long time Dodgers' play-by-play announcer Vin Scully.

In 2017, the network announced a 10 game package for KTLA. The games were all in April and May, with the hope that they would convince fans to pay for Spectrum SportsNet later in the season. These games averaged significantly more viewership, 378,000 households, compared to the average games on Spectrum SportsNet, 79,000 households, as of June 2017. Six additional games would be added for August and September. This package was reduced again to five March and April games for 2018. Though five more games would later be added in August and September.

In 2019, the Dodgers and KTLA announced an agreement to air ten early season games and, like in 2017 and 2018, the network would add five additional games in August and September. The Dodgers would stop airing games over-the-air after Spectrum SportsNet reached an agreement with AT&T in 2020.

=== Direct-to-consumer ===
In 2024, Spectrum SportsNet announced that Spectrum internet and mobile subscribers would be able to stream SportsNet LA at no additional cost.

In 2025, Spectrum Sportsnet announced that it would offer a DTC subscription package covering all regional games, branded as SNLA+; the service will be distributed via a partnership with MLB.tv, becoming the second first-party broadcaster to host its DTC service on the platform. Unlike a similar agreement between MLB.tv and the Mets, a bundle with SportsNet LA and MLB.tv is not available.
