= Tom Gregorio =

American baseball player (born 1977)

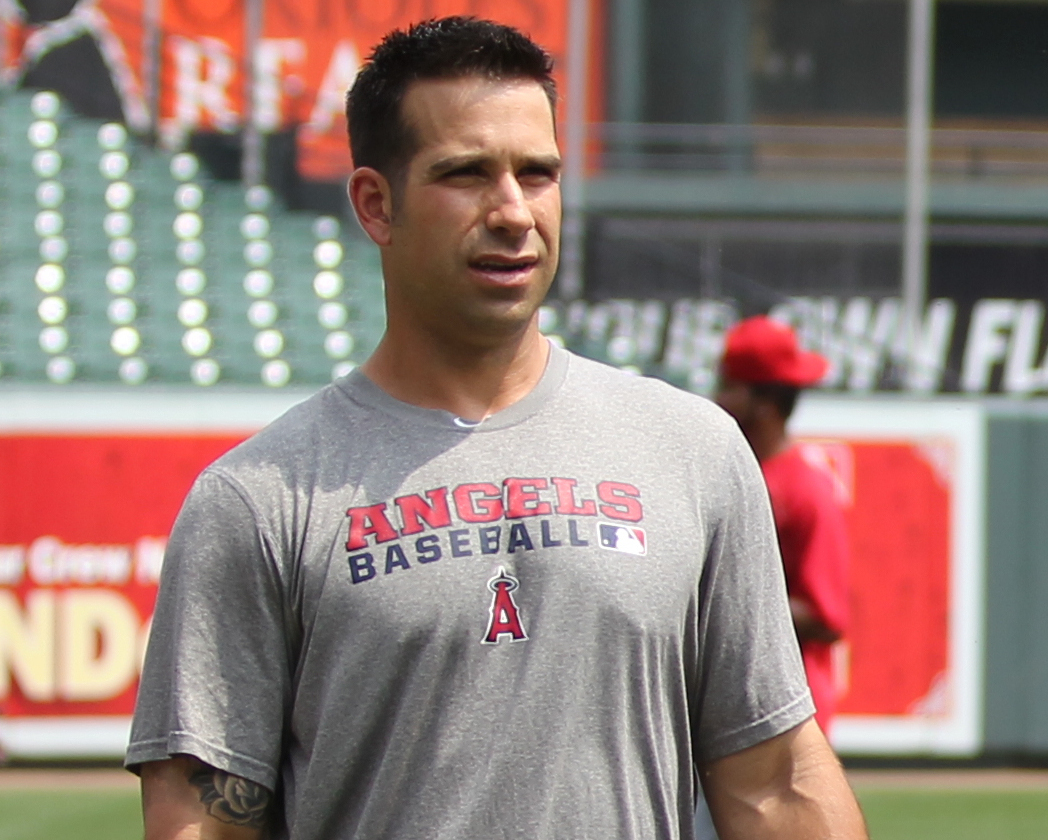
- Gregorio in 2011

Los Angeles Angels – No. 70
- Catcher / Bullpen catcher
- Born: May 5, 1977 (age 49); Brooklyn, New York, U.S.
- Batted: Right Threw: Right

MLB debut
- September 5, 2003, for the Anaheim Angels

Last MLB appearance
- September 27, 2003, for the Anaheim Angels

MLB statistics
- Batting average: .158
- Hits: 3
- Runs batted in: 2
- Stats at Baseball Reference

Teams
- As player: Anaheim Angels (2003); As coach: Los Angeles Angels of Anaheim / Los Angeles Angels (2006–present)

Thomas Andrew Gregorio (born May 5, 1977) is an American former professional baseball catcher, who played in Major League Baseball (MLB) for the Anaheim Angels. He served as the bullpen catcher for the Los Angeles Angels from the latter part of 2010 through the end of the 2018 season.

Gregorio played college baseball at Troy University. He also played eight seasons in the minor league systems of the Oakland Athletics, Seattle Mariners, and Texas Rangers, batting .242/.299/.353. After being released by all three teams in a span of shortly over a year, Gregorio officially retired after the 2006 season. Previously, he was the roving catching coordinator for the Angels.
