= Pete Arbogast =

American radio announcer (born 1954)

Pete Arbogast (born December 5, 1954) is a radio announcer who is the voice of the USC Trojans. He has called football, men's basketball, and women's basketball for the Trojans and was the voice of the Cincinnati Bengals.

== Biography ==
Arbogast was born in Chicago but grew up in Los Angeles. He graduated from John Marshall High School in 1972, attended Los Angeles City College, and graduated from USC in 1978. After graduation, he worked in Twin Falls, Idaho and Victorville, California and was the play-by-play announcer for KTIP in Porterville.

Arbogast started doing play-by-play for the USC Trojans in basketball and football in the 1989 season, replacing Tom Kelly who moved to television. Arbogast took over for men's basketball duties for USC again after Rory Markas died. He was the public address announcer for the Los Angeles Dodgers from 1989 to 1994 while also fulfilling his Trojan duties. Coincidentally, he won the audition for the job on January 25, 1989, the same day that former Dodgers public address announcer John Ramsey passed away. He left the position after the 1994 season and was permanently replaced by Mike Carlucci in 1995. Between the 1997 and 2000 seasons, Arbogast also served as the voice of the Bengals.

Arbogast has also announced for CBS Radio, CBS's Olympics coverage, and Los Angeles Clippers broadcasts. Arbogast was a sports anchor for KNX and anchored the morning news for the short lived K-News in Los Angeles. His primary job as of 2024 was the youth director for the Santa Monica YMCA. He also volunteers at St. John's Health Center to comfort terminally ill patients who may die alone.

He is a five-time winner of the Southern California Sports Broadcasters radio play by play of the year award from 2018 to 2021 and 2023 and is president of and in that organization's Hall of Fame. He has called more Trojans football games on radio than any other person in history.

He is the son of late broadcaster Bob Arbogast.
