= Terry Smith (sportscaster) =

American sports announcer (born 1955)

Terry Smith (born June 14, 1955) is an American sports announcer for KLAA radio in Los Angeles, California, and has broadcast play-by-play for the Los Angeles Angels since 2002. Smith also hosts the Angels' post-game call-in show "Angel Talk" and the Angels' hot-stove program "Angels Tonight".

== Broadcasting career ==
Prior to his job with the Angels, Smith was for 19 years the play-by-play broadcaster for the former New York Yankees AAA affiliate Columbus Clippers. From 1983 to 1997, Smith was also Sports Director at WBNS AM in Columbus, OH, where he was recognized three times by the Ohio Associated Press for his sportscasts. During Smith's tenure, the station was named the Outstanding Sports Operation in Ohio six times by the Associated Press. Smith was known as "The Voice," working as sports anchor, talk show host and play-by-play announcer for the Ohio State University Football and Basketball Radio Network from 1986 to 1997.

Smith started his baseball broadcasting career in 1978, calling games for the Jacksonville Suns and later called games for the Memphis Chicks from 1981 to 1982. At Memphis, Smith also worked as the Sports Director on WHBQ AM, anchoring sports on the morning and afternoon drive shows.

=== Play calls ===
- "Struck him out!"
- "Good News!" - at the end of an inning if the Angels take or extend a lead
- "He hits one high and deep into (field)!"
- "He put a charge into that one!"
- "That ball is out-ta here!" - When an Angels player hits a home run
- "You can put a Halo over this one!" - when the Angels win, similar to Jerry Coleman's famous "hang a star" phrase.

Smith's announcing style is similar that of the late Harry Kalas - also from Philadelphia - using such lines as "That ball is out-ta here!" and "Struck him out!"

== Personal life ==
Smith is a native of Philadelphia and attended Temple University, where he played collegiate club hockey, as well as Jones College in Jacksonville FL.

In 2002, Smith made his screen debut as a broadcaster in the baseball movie, "A Little Inside", which aired on HBO and Showtime. He has served as Honorary Chair of the Orange County Learning for Life's Exploring program.

Smith and his wife Sonia have one son, Jordan, a graduate of UC Santa Barbara, and make their home in Ladera Ranch, CA.
