= Steve Physioc =

American sportscaster

- Born: Steven Howard Physioc; December 28, 1954 (age 71); Summit, New Jersey, U.S.
- Occupations: Radio and television broadcaster
- Years active: 1983–2022
- Spouse: Stacey
- Children: 2

Steven Howard Physioc (/ˈfɪziɒk/; born December 28, 1954) is a retired American sportscaster who has called play-by-play for various baseball, basketball, and football teams. He retired while working with the Kansas City Royals, whom he had worked with since February 2012.

== Early life and education ==
Physioc grew up as a Kansas City Royals fan in Merriam, Kansas and graduated from Kansas State University in 1977.

== Career ==
He began his announcing career as sports director for KHAS radio in Hastings, Nebraska, covering local high school and Hastings College athletics. After that he went on to become the radio voice of Kansas State Wildcats football and basketball (1979–1982). Mitch Holthus took over after he left K-State. Physioc was also a sports anchor on WIBW-TV in Topeka during the late 1970s and early '80s, and at WLWT in Cincinnati, where he worked alongside Jerry Springer.

=== Professional sports announcing duties ===
Physioc began his major league play-by-play announcing career in 1983, broadcasting Cincinnati Bengals football and Cincinnati Reds baseball games, a position he held until 1987.

He then served as the San Francisco Giants announcer for KTVU-TV from 1987 to 1988, followed by work for ESPN (1989–1995), announcing Major League Baseball, college basketball, baseball and Big Ten football.

In 1995, he announced San Diego Padres games and Pac-10 football games for Fox Sports West. Physioc's previous experience also includes radio play-by-play for the NBA's Golden State Warriors (1989–1990) and the NFL's Los Angeles Rams (1994), and television play-by-play for the Warriors (1990–1991) and the Vancouver Grizzlies during their inaugural season (1995–1996) in the NBA.

In 1996, Physioc was hired by the California Angels to announce baseball games for their local telecasts. In November 2009, he was released from the Angels' broadcast crew along with longtime partner Rex Hudler, ending his 13 years of service with the club.

On June 27, 2010, Physioc handled substitute play-by-play duties for the TBS MLB Sunday telecast of the Detroit Tigers at the Atlanta Braves alongside David Wells and Ron Darling.

In February 2012, Physioc was hired by the Kansas City Royals to call games part-time on television (he reunited with former Angel's partner Hudler) and radio.

In November 2022, Physioc announced his retirement from broadcasting.

=== College sports announcing duties ===
==== Basketball ====
During the baseball offseason, Physioc broadcasts other sporting events, primarily college basketball games (primarily in the West Coast Conference), on the ESPNU network. On January 7, 2006, Physioc made a guest appearance as a substitute play-by-play announcer for the Los Angeles Lakers, taking the place of Joel Meyers for one game because Meyers was on assignment. Phsyioc also appears on Fox Sports Net for college basketball games for the Pac-12 and Big 12 conferences.

In late 2008, Physioc was asked to fill in for his Angels broadcast partner Rory Markas, who was the lead announcer for USC Trojans Basketball. Physioc and fellow Cincinnati Bengals alum Pete Arbogast alternated play-by-play of Trojans basketball for a few weeks until Markas returned. In January 2010, Physioc and Arbogast again were asked to take over the Trojans' broadcasts following the sudden death of Markas, with Physioc broadcasting one game, and Arbogast taking over the rest of the broadcast schedule.

Physioc was featured on ESPNU Midnight Madness on October 16, 2009, along with Steve Lavin.

==== Football ====
Physioc appears on Fox Sports Net for play by play of Pac-12 and Big-12 football games.

=== Author ===
Physioc has published three novels, The Walls of Lucca, a historical novel set in post-World War I Italy (2018), a sequel, Above the Walls (2019), and Walks with the Wind (2021).

Video Games

Physioc appeared in the MLB 2k series as a reporter from 2006 to 2009.

== Personal life ==
He is married to Stacey Physioc and has two children. He is involved in church and charitable affairs.
