= Amaury Pi-González =

American Spanish-language baseball announcer

Amaury Pi-González (born 1944 or 1945) is a Spanish language sports broadcaster. He most recently was the play-by-play announcer for the Oakland Athletics. He is the only major league baseball announcer to have broadcast, in Spanish, for four major league teams. From 2003 to 2006, Pi-González was broadcasting for two MLB teams, the San Francisco Giants and Seattle Mariners. In 2009 and 2010, Pi-González worked with the Spanish Beisbol Network broadcasting A's games.

After previous stints with the Oakland Athletics, San Francisco Giants, and Seattle Mariners, Pi-González joined the Los Angeles Angels of Anaheim for the 2007 season. He was the play-by-play Spanish broadcaster for FSN West TV-Los Angeles Angels of Anaheim production. He broadcast Athletics games beginning in 1977. He and color commentator Manolo Hernandez-Douen were not retained when the franchise moved to West Sacramento, California.

Pi-González also was the Spanish radio voice of the Golden State Warriors from 1992 to 1998. He has also covered the Super Bowl, World Cup soccer, and other events for Spanish radio.

Pi-González was inducted into the Cuban Sports Hall of Fame in Miami and the Hispanic Heritage Baseball Museum Hall of Fame in 2004 and Bay Area Radio Hall of Fame in 2010. He has been listed on the Ford C. Frick Award nominating ballot since 2004.

Born in Cuba, Pi-González emigrated to Miami in 1961.
