= Daron Sutton =

American baseball broadcaster (born 1969)

- Broadcaster
- Born: October 21, 1969 (age 57); Los Angeles, California, U.S.
- Stats at Baseball Reference

Teams
- As Broadcaster: Atlanta Braves Host (1997–1999); Anaheim Angels Radio (2000–2001); Milwaukee Brewers TV (2002–2006); Arizona Diamondbacks TV (2007–2012); FOX Sports TV (2010–2015); Pac-12 Network TV (2014–2024); Los Angeles Angels TV (2021); Los Angeles Dodgers TV (2022); Grand Canyon Antelopes TV (2025–present)

Daron Sutton (born October 21, 1969) is an American sports broadcaster who has served as a television host and play-by-play announcer for a variety of teams, networks and organizations. Sutton is the primary television broadcaster for the Grand Canyon Antelopes while also calling action for the Arizona Wildcats. He also leads content for Perfect Game.

Sutton has worked for five different Major League Baseball organizations: the Atlanta Braves, Milwaukee Brewers, Arizona Diamondbacks, Los Angeles Angels and Los Angeles Dodgers. His initial television role was as a pregame host and fill-in play-by-play for the Braves, followed by two years of radio play-by-play for the Angels, then five years as the play-by-play voice of the Brewers. He later served as the television voice of the Diamondbacks for five and a half seasons, and then filled part time television roles with the Angels followed by the Dodgers. Sutton was a play-by-play voice of the Pac-12 Network from 2014 through the network's termination in 2024.

Daron Sutton is the son of deceased former pitcher and Baseball Hall of Famer Don Sutton, who was also a broadcaster.

== Career ==
Sutton started his career at CNN in 1992 upon graduating from Auburn University at Montgomery in 1992 with a degree in communications. He also pitched professionally for two years in the Anaheim Angels and Atlanta Braves organizations.

Daron had been close to the game since birth as his father was MLB Hall of Fame pitcher Don Sutton. Daron had the opportunity to work alongside his father as a member of the Atlanta Braves broadcast team from 1997 through 1999, including hosting pre-game and post-game shows and play-by-play work for Braves telecasts on Fox Sports Net South.

While working in Atlanta, he also broadcast many Southeastern Conference sporting events, including basketball, gymnastics, swimming, and track and field.

In 2000–01, Daron served as the radio voice of the Anaheim Angels, where he worked with Mario Impemba. From 2002–06, Sutton was the television voice of the Milwaukee Brewers. In 2003, Sutton received a Chicago/Midwest chapter Emmy Award for Outstanding Achievement for Individual Excellence on Camera. He also was nominated four other times for regional Emmy Awards in similar capacities.

Sutton was released from his contract by the Brewers amicably on October 23, 2006, as he had sought to pursue other options. He was mentioned as a possible replacement for Thom Brennaman with the Arizona Diamondbacks and signed a five-year contract, with a three-year club option, to replace Brennaman on November 1, 2006. Sutton was the voice of the Diamondbacks until June 2012.

From 2010 until 2015, Daron also handled play-by-play assignments for Fox Saturday Baseball. In recent years, Sutton continued to broadcast Fox Baseball, Fox Sports 1 High School and College Football, Pac-12 Network basketball, baseball, softball, volleyball, soccer, gymnastics and wrestling, while serving as a spokesman for Perfect Game, hosting a weekly show on MLB Network Radio.

Sutton founded and assisted in the launch of PerfectGame.TV, a streaming network devoted to the coverage of amateur baseball and softball. He serves as the network's Executive Producer and lead host, while acting as the Vice President of Content for Perfect Game. Sutton currently hosts three weekly shows on SiriusXM, MLB Roundtrip with Perfect Game, Perfect Game College Baseball and Perfect Game Softball, as well as a weekly syndicated television show, Perfect Game Weekly.

On March 11, 2021, Sutton rejoined the Los Angeles Angels as a play-by-play broadcaster on Bally Sports West, sharing the role with Matt Vasgersian.

In May 2022, Sutton joined the Los Angeles Dodgers as their fill-in play-by-play broadcaster on Spectrum SportsNet LA, filling in for primary broadcaster Joe Davis when he was broadcasting national games for Fox Sports.

== Personal life ==
Sutton resides in Scottsdale, Arizona, and is married to Carol Wilsey-Sutton. They are parents to Abbey, Lilly, Tori and Lexi.

Among the various charities that he participates in, Sutton also hosted an annual charity golf tournament in the Phoenix area, which benefitted the Southwest Autism Resource and Research Center, Sutton's Stroke for the Little Folks.
