= Rory Markas =

American sportscaster (1955–2010)

- Rory Markas at Angel Stadium of Anaheim on May 7, 2004
- Born: December 20, 1955; Hollywood, California, U.S.
- Died: January 4, 2010 (aged 54); Palmdale, California, U.S.
- Occupations: Radio and television broadcaster
- Years active: 1984–2010

Rory Markas (December 20, 1955 – January 4, 2010) was an American sportscaster best known as the Los Angeles Angels of Anaheim's play-by-play broadcaster for eight seasons and as the radio voice of the University of Southern California men's basketball team for 11 seasons. He also worked as a field reporter and part-time sports anchor for KTTV.

Born in Hollywood, California, Markas was a graduate of Los Angeles Valley College, California State University-Northridge, and Chatsworth High School. He won four Golden Mike Awards, two Associated Press Sportscasting Awards, and the 2008 Radio Play-by-Play Award from the Southern California Broadcasters Association.

== Early career ==
Markas previously worked for KTUC in Tucson, CBS' KNX-AM and KCBS-TV, the Los Angeles Clippers, the Milwaukee Brewers, Fox Sports Net West, and the Pacific Coast League's Salt Lake City Gulls and Vancouver Canadians. He was also the lead announcer for RollerJam from its second season to its last. Most recently, and possibly his final effort, was the recording of the play-by-play segments for the upcoming motion picture "The Yankles". Rory Markas's voice is the first and last voice heard in the movie.

== Health issues and death ==
In late 2008, Markas underwent surgery to remove a blood clot in his brain, which sidelined him for about six weeks. Steve Physioc, his Angels partner, filled in for Markas on several USC basketball games. Pete Arbogast, USC's regular radio voice for football and previous voice for basketball, filled in for most of the rest of that season.

On January 4, 2010, the 54-year-old Markas was found dead at his Palmdale, California home, the victim of an apparent heart attack.

Many obituaries noted that Markas would be remembered for his signature "Just another Halo victory!" call after Angel wins and for his call of the final play of the 2002 World Series at Angel Stadium. He was also known for his interviewing skills—for example, his Angels radio pre-game talk with former Negro leagues player Buck O'Neil.

== See also ==
- List of Los Angeles Angels of Anaheim broadcasters
