= Rich Waltz =

American sportscaster (born 1962)

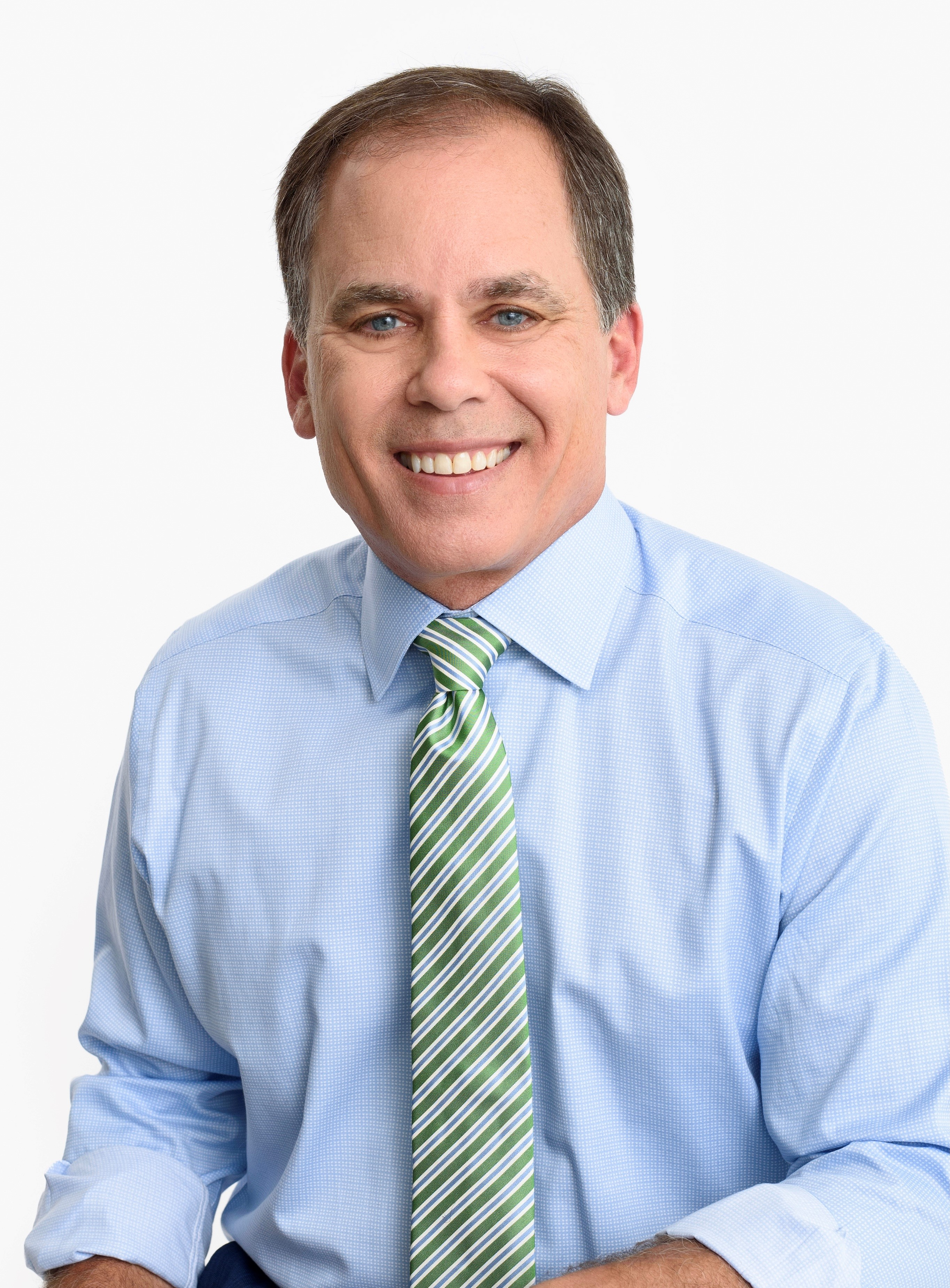
- Born: Martinez, California, U.S.
- Education: Los Medanos College; University of California, Davis, 1986
- Occupation: Play-by-play announcer
- Employer(s): CBS Sports; Apple TV; Los Angeles Angels; Arizona Diamondbacks; Seattle Mariners

Rich Waltz is an American television play-by-play commentator currently calling college football & basketball for CBS Sports and Major League Baseball for MLB Network, Apple TV's Friday Night Baseball and the Seattle Mariners. A three-time Emmy winner, Waltz is formerly known for calling television broadcasts for the Miami Marlins of Major League Baseball from 2005 to 2017. Waltz's dismissal by the Marlins was criticized by fans and media. Over the past few years, Waltz has filled in on games for the Los Angeles Angels, Arizona Diamondbacks, Seattle Mariners and Turner Sports, On TBS, Waltz called the Alec Mills no-hitter for the Chicago Cubs, which was the sixth MLB no-hitter he has announced. Waltz also called the 2020 AL Wild Card Series for TBS alongside Jimmy Rollins.

== Broadcasting career ==
=== Major League Baseball ===
From 2012 to 2015, Waltz called games on Fox's Saturday Baseball package, and he has filled in on MLB Network's Thursday Night Baseball coverage. Waltz has called five World Baseball Classics (WBC) for MLB Network; in 2013, 2017 and 2023 he partnered with Buck Martinez and called two rounds of the WBC in Japan and Arizona.

Waltz joined FSN Florida from FSN Northwest. He has also called Major League Baseball games for Fox, ESPN, ESPN Radio, and FX nationally along with the Seattle Mariners and Toronto Blue Jays broadcasts on CBC Television in Canada. Waltz's no-hitters include Aníbal Sánchez's in September 2006, Roy Halladay's perfect game on May 29, 2010, and Henderson Alvarez's no-hitter against the Detroit Tigers on the final game of the 2013 Major League Baseball season.

On June 18, 2024, during MLB Network's broadcast of the Rickwood Field game, Waltz was tasked with the responsibility of breaking the news of MLB legend Willie Mays’ passing. The event in Birmingham, AL, showcased Mays and his hometown.

=== Other sports broadcasting experience ===
Since 2014 Rich's College Football and Basketball has been with CBS Sports and CBS Sports Network. His CBS analysts have included Logan Ryan, Adam Archuleta, Aaron Murray, Aaron Taylor, and Ross Tucker. From 1997 to 2002, Waltz called college football games for ESPN, ESPN Radio and ABC in the Big Ten, SEC and ACC conferences. His football experience also includes NFL Europe for Fox, Pac-12 Football for FSN, and NFL preseason games for the Seattle Seahawks.

From 2010 to 2012, Waltz called games on ACC College Football Saturday and SEC Saturday Nights produced and distributed by Fox Sports Net and Raycom Sports. His college basketball work has included games in every major conference for Fox, ESPN, CBS, CBS Sports Network, and Raycom. In 2018 Waltz called the NBA Playoffs and the NCAA Tournament East Regional on TNT's VR platform.

Waltz's ESPN assignments included the Women's NCAA basketball tournament, Arena Football, NCAA College Softball World Series, Little League World Series Regional Finals, and Major League Soccer. Waltz has also called both ATP and WTA events on Tennis Channel, including 2015 events from Dubai, Doha, and Buenos Aires.

In the 2019, NCAA Super Regional on ESPN, he called the 19-strikeout no-hitter by Vanderbilt's Kumar Rocker.

== Philanthropic work ==
In 2006, Waltz helped create and organize the FSN Fantasy Auction, which in 12 years raised more than $1.2 million for the Marlins Community Foundation. In 2008, he was honored by the Marlins with their Community Service Award.

== Playing career ==
Waltz played college baseball, first for Los Medanos College in Pittsburg, California, then at the University of California, Davis. He was a starting infielder for the Aggies on two conference championship teams.
