= Satellite Award for Outstanding Sports Game =

Video game award

There were different kinds of now retired Satellite Awards including Sports Games given as an annual award by the International Press Academy, such as

- Satellite Award for Outstanding Sports Game (2004 & 2006)
- Satellite Award for Outstanding Sports/Fighting/Racing Game (2005)
- Satellite Award for Outstanding Sports/Racing Game (2008 & 2011-2013 & 2016)
- Satellite Award for Outstanding Sports/Rhythm/Music Game (2007)

Furthermore, there was only one non-sports related Satellite Award referring to Music Games in 2008:

- Satellite Award for Outstanding Music/Rhythm Game

== Winners and nominees ==
=== Outstanding Sports/Other Game ===
Year	Category	Winners and nominees	Developer	Publisher
2004 (winner unknown)	Sports	ESPN NFL 2K5	Visual Concepts	2K Sports
2004 (winner unknown)	Sports	Major League Baseball 2005	Sony Computer Entertainment	989 Studios
2004 (winner unknown)	Sports	NBA Ballers	Midway Games	Midway Games
2004 (winner unknown)	Sports	NFL Street	Electronic Arts	Electronic Arts
2004 (winner unknown)	Sports	MX Unleashed	Rainbow Studios, Humagade	THQ
2004 (winner unknown)	Sports	Tony Hawk's Underground 2	Neversoft, Vicarious Visions	Activision
2005	Sports/Fighting/Racing	Burnout Revenge	Criterion Games	Electronic Arts
2005	Sports/Fighting/Racing	187 Ride or Die	Ubisoft	Ubisoft
2005	Sports/Fighting/Racing	Blitz: The League	Midway Games	Warner Bros. Interactive Entertainment
2005	Sports/Fighting/Racing	L.A. Rush	Midway Studios – Newcastle	Midway Games, Zoo Digital Publishing
2005	Sports/Fighting/Racing	NBA Street Volume 3	Electronic Arts	EA Sports Big
2005	Sports/Fighting/Racing	Tekken 5	Namco	Namco, Sony Computer Entertainment
2006	Sports	FIFA 07	Electronic Arts, Exient Entertainment	Electronic Arts
2006	Sports	MLB '06: The Show	San Diego Studio	Sony Computer Entertainment
2006	Sports	NCAA Football 2007	Electronic Arts	Electronic Arts
2006	Sports	Pro Evolution Soccer 5	Konami	Konami
2006	Sports	Rockstar Games Presents Table Tennis	Rockstar San Diego	Rockstar Games
2007	Sports/Rhythm/Music	Guitar Hero II	Harmonix	Activision
2007	Sports/Rhythm/Music	Elite Beat Agents	iNiS	Nintendo
2007	Sports/Rhythm/Music	Forza Motorsport 2	Turn 10 Studios	Microsoft Studios
2007	Sports/Rhythm/Music	Wii Sports	Nintendo	Nintendo
2007	Sports/Rhythm/Music	Pro Evolution Soccer 2007	Konami	Konami
2008	Sports/Racing	NHL 09	Electronic Arts, HB Studios	Electronic Arts
2008	Sports/Racing	Burnout Paradise	Criterion Games	Electronic Arts
2008	Sports/Racing	FIFA 09	Electronic Arts, Sumo Digital, Exient Entertainment	Electronic Arts
2008	Sports/Racing	Mario Kart Wii	Nintendo	Nintendo
2008	Sports/Racing	MLB 08: The Show	San Diego Studio	Sony Computer Entertainment
2008	Sports/Racing	Wii Fit	Nintendo	Nintendo
2011	Sports/Racing	Forza Motorsport 4	Turn 10 Studios	Microsoft Studios
2011	Sports/Racing	FIFA 12	Electronic Arts	Electronic Arts
2011	Sports/Racing	MLB 11: The Show	San Diego Studio	Sony Computer Entertainment
2011	Sports/Racing	NBA 2K12	Visual Concepts, Virtuos	2K Sports
2012	Sports/Racing	Forza Horizon	Playground Games, Turn 10 Studios	Microsoft Studios
2012	Sports/Racing	FIFA 13	Electronic Arts	Electronic Arts
2012	Sports/Racing	LittleBigPlanet Karting	United Front Games, San Diego Studio, Media Molecule	Sony Computer Entertainment
2012	Sports/Racing	Madden NFL 13	Electronic Arts	Electronic Arts
2012	Sports/Racing	Pro Evolution Soccer 2013	Konami	Konami
2013	Sports/Racing	Need for Speed Rivals	Ghost Games	Electronic Arts
2013	Sports/Racing	FIFA 14	Electronic Arts	Electronic Arts
2013	Sports/Racing	Forza Motorsport 5	Turn 10 Studios	Microsoft Studios
2013	Sports/Racing	Grid 2	Codemasters, Feral Interactive	Codemasters, Feral Interactive
2013	Sports/Racing	NBA 2K14	Visual Concepts	2K Sports
2016	Sports/Racing	NHL 17	Electronic Arts	Electronic Arts
2016	Sports/Racing	FIFA 17	Electronic Arts	Electronic Arts
2016	Sports/Racing	Mario & Sonic at the Rio 2016 Olympic Games	Sega Sports R&D	Nintendo
2016	Sports/Racing	MLB The Show 16	San Diego Studio	Sony Interactive Entertainment
2016	Sports/Racing	Pro Evolution Soccer 2017	PES Productions	Konami

=== Outstanding Music/Rhythm Game ===
Year	Winner and nominees	Developer	Publisher
2008	Rock Band 2	Harmonix, Pi Studios	MTV Games
2008	Guitar Hero World Tour	Neversoft, Budcat Creations, Vicarious Visions	Activision, Aspyr Media
2008	Patapon	Pyramid, Japan Studio	Sony Computer Entertainment
2008	Rock Band	Harmonix, MTV Games	Electronic Arts
2008	Singstar	London Studio	Sony Computer Entertainment
