= Rex Hudler =

American baseball player and broadcaster (born 1960)

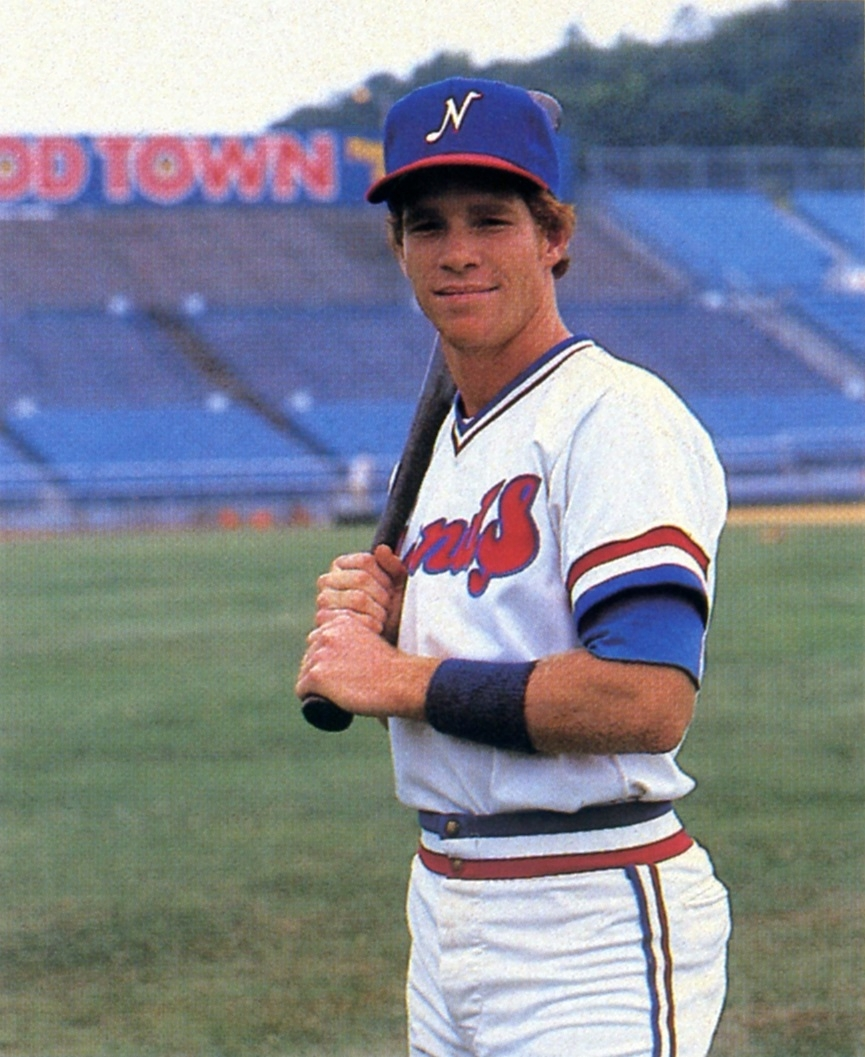
- Hudler with the Nashville Sounds in 1982
- Utility player
- Born: September 2, 1960 (age 65); Tempe, Arizona, U.S.
- Batted: Right Threw: Right

Professional debut
- MLB: September 9, 1984, for the New York Yankees
- NPB: April 10, 1993, for the Yakult Swallows

Last appearance
- MLB: June 23, 1998, for the Philadelphia Phillies
- NPB: November 1, 1993, for the Yakult Swallows

MLB statistics
- Batting average: .261
- Home runs: 56
- Runs batted in: 169
- Stolen bases: 107

NPB statistics
- Batting average: .300
- Home runs: 14
- Runs batted in: 64
- Stolen bases: 1
- Stats at Baseball Reference

Teams
- New York Yankees (1984–1985); Baltimore Orioles (1986); Montreal Expos (1988–1990); St. Louis Cardinals (1990–1992); Yakult Swallows (1993); California Angels (1994–1996); Philadelphia Phillies (1997–1998)

Rex Allen Hudler (born September 2, 1960) is an American former Major League Baseball utility player and color commentator for the Kansas City Royals. He played a total of 14 seasons after being a first round draft pick of the New York Yankees in 1978.

== Playing career ==
Hudler played for six different Major League Baseball teams, and at every position except pitcher and catcher throughout his career: the New York Yankees (1984–1985), Baltimore Orioles (1986), Montreal Expos (1988–1990), St. Louis Cardinals (1990–1992), California Angels (1994–1996), and Philadelphia Phillies (1997–1998). After batting .250 with the Columbus Clippers and .157 in 20 games with the Yankees, he was traded along with Rich Bordi to the Orioles for Gary Roenicke on December 11, 1985 in a transaction that was completed five days later on December 16 when Leo Hernández was also sent to New York. He also played for the Yakult Swallows of the Japanese Central League in 1993, contributing to the team's Japan Series championship.

A 1978 graduate of Bullard High School (Fresno, California), Hudler played baseball, soccer and football, earning first-team All-America honors as a wide receiver. Prior to signing with the Yankees, Hudler was visited by Notre Dame, which hoped that he would suit up for their football team.

Hudler saw playing time in the minor leagues with the Rochester Red Wings of the Triple-A International League in 1986 and 1987. He then saw playing time with the Triple-A Indianapolis Indians of the American Association in 1988 as the starting third baseman. He retired from professional baseball following his final appearance with the Buffalo Bisons on July 16, 1998.

Hudler was nicknamed "Bug-Eater" during his time in St. Louis. During a game, he picked an enormous June bug off his cap. Cardinals teammate Tom Pagnozzi dared him to eat it. His teammates collectively offered him $800 to eat the bug, which he accepted.

Hudler was a 1999 inductee into the Fresno Athletic Hall of Fame.

== Broadcasting career ==
From 1999 through the 2009 season, Hudler was the color commentator for the Los Angeles Angels of Anaheim radio and television broadcasting team, alongside play-by-play announcers Steve Physioc, Rory Markas, and Terry Smith. He is also the color commentator for the PlayStation 2 and PlayStation Portable games MLB 06: The Show, 07, 08, 09, 10, and 11 and is also featured in 10 for the PlayStation 3 along with Dave Campbell and Matt Vasgersian. For the 2011 edition on the PlayStation 3, he was replaced by Eric Karros. He also provided color commentary, with ESPN's Jon Miller on play-by-play, for the 2004 Xbox and PlayStation 2 title ESPN Major League Baseball.

Hudler was suspended briefly from his broadcast job in 2003 after being arrested at Kansas City International Airport for possession of cannabis and medical paraphernalia.

In November 2009 the Angels and FSN West announced they would not renew the contracts of Hudler and Physioc for the 2010 season.

In October 2010, Hudler hosted The Wonder Dog Hour on Angels flagship station KLAA, 830 AM in Orange, California.

On February 13, 2012, he was announced as the new television color commentator for the Kansas City Royals, teaming up with Ryan Lefebvre and his old partner Steve Physioc.

== Personal life ==
Hudler married his wife, Jennifer, in 1988. They are religious. They have a daughter, Alyssa, followed by three sons: William, Cade and David. Cade, born in 1996, has Down syndrome. Rex and Jennifer started "Team Up For Down Syndrome", a non-profit which helps children with Down's and other disabilities, and helps their families as well.

Hudler was hospitalized in 2001 with a brain aneurysm.
