= MLB: The Show =

American baseball video game series

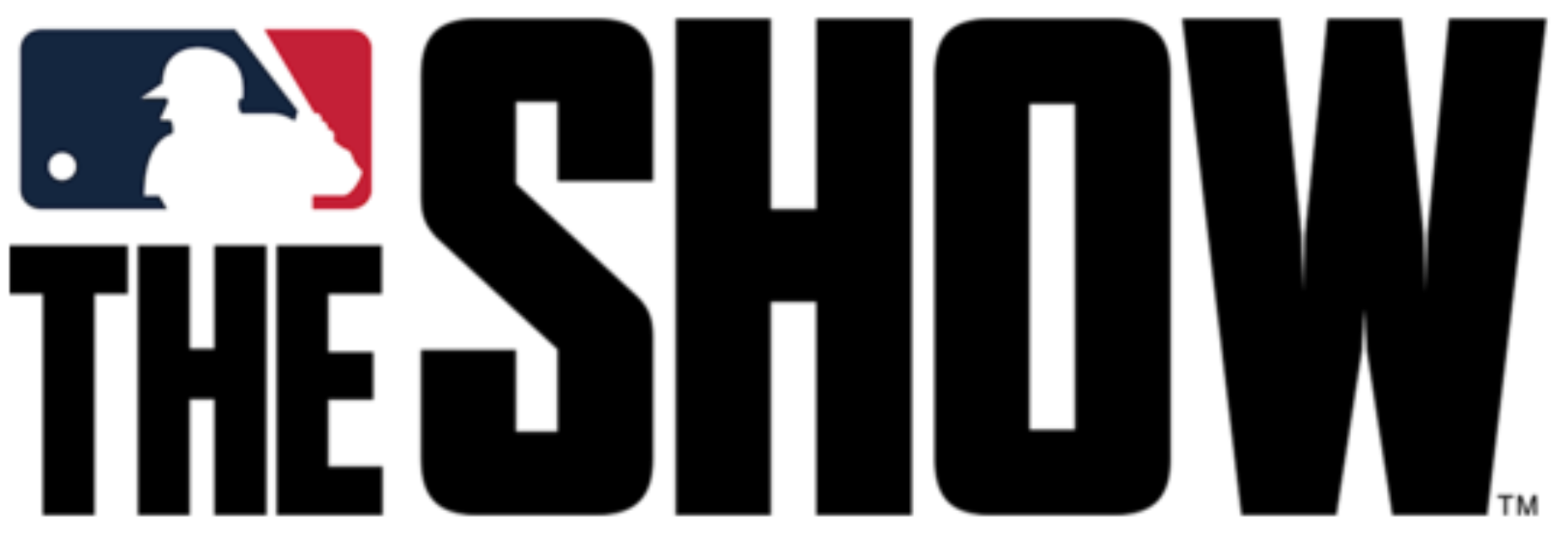
- MLB: The Show current logo
- Genre: Sports
- Developer: San Diego Studio
- Publishers: Sony Interactive Entertainment (Note: Distributor for non-PlayStation consoles); MLB Advanced Media (Note: Non-PlayStation consoles)
- Platforms: PlayStation 2, PlayStation 3, PlayStation Portable, PlayStation 4, PlayStation Vita, PlayStation 5, Xbox One, Xbox Series X/S, Nintendo Switch
- First release: MLB 06: The Show PlayStation 2 February 28, 2006
- Latest release: MLB The Show 26; March 17, 2026

MLB: The Show is an American baseball video game series created and developed by San Diego Studio and published by Sony Interactive Entertainment. The series has received critical and commercial acclaim, and since 2014 has been the sole Major League Baseball simulation video game on the market for consoles.

The series debuted in 2006 with MLB 06: The Show for the PlayStation 2 and PlayStation Portable, following the MLB series from 989 Sports. There has been a new release in the series every year since 2006.

The series was released on PlayStation 2 from 2006's MLB 06: The Show through 2011's MLB 11: The Show and was available on the PlayStation 3 from MLB 07: The Show through MLB The Show 16. Portable versions of the series for either the PlayStation Portable or PlayStation Vita accompanied every entry from MLB 06: The Show through MLB 15: The Show. The series started releasing on the PlayStation 4 with MLB 14: The Show.

After over two decades of exclusivity with PlayStation consoles, MLB: The Show ceased to be released only on PlayStation, and started to be released on other consoles by MLB Advanced Media, though the edition of the game at the time—MLB The Show 20—was a PlayStation 4 exclusive. MLB The Show 21 is the first title in the series to be released on the Xbox One and Xbox Series X/S; MLB The Show 22 is the first game of the series to be on a Nintendo console, released on the Nintendo Switch.

== Gameplay ==
Gameplay simulates a game of professional baseball, with the player controlling an entire team, a team's manager, or a select player. The player may take control of one of 30 Major League Baseball teams in any game mode and also is able to choose from 6 special team including NL and AL all star teams (excluding Road to the Show) and use that team in gameplay. The Series has variable game modes in which a player takes control of a team for a single game, one season, or a franchise (multiple seasons).

The online gameplay mode Diamond Dynasty allows users to create teams through collecting cards of current players and MLB legends. Players take their teams into various online matches to earn rewards to continue upgrading their team.

The offline gameplay mode Road to the Show allows users to take control of their own ballplayer on their journey through high school, college, the minor leagues, and on to the MLB. Players earn upgrade tokens and equipment packages to level up their player.

== Predecessors from 989 Sports ==
Game	Release date	Cover Athlete		Platforms
Game	Release date	Star	Team	Platforms
MLB Pennant Race	October 14, 1996	David Justice	Atlanta Braves	PlayStation
MLB '98	July 1, 1997	Bernie Williams	New York Yankees	PlayStation
MLB '99	March 31, 1998	Cal Ripken Jr.	Baltimore Orioles	PlayStation
MLB 2000	February 28, 1999	Mo Vaughn	Anaheim Angels	PlayStation
MLB 2001	February 29, 2000	Chipper Jones	Atlanta Braves	PlayStation
MLB 2002	May 7, 2001	Andruw Jones	Atlanta Braves	PlayStation
MLB 2003	June 17, 2002	Barry Bonds	San Francisco Giants	PlayStation
MLB 2004	April 30, 2003	Shawn Green	Los Angeles Dodgers	PlayStation, PlayStation 2
MLB 2005	March 4, 2004	Eric Chavez	Oakland Athletics	PlayStation, PlayStation 2
MLB 2006	March 8, 2005	Vladimir Guerrero Sr.	Los Angeles Angels	PlayStation 2, PlayStation Portable

== Games ==
Game	Release date	Cover Athlete		Platforms
Game	Release date	Star	Team	Platforms
MLB 06: The Show	February 28, 2006	David Ortiz	Boston Red Sox	PlayStation 2, PlayStation Portable
MLB 07: The Show	February 27, 2007 (PS2/PSP)	David Wright	New York Mets	PlayStation 2, PlayStation 3, PlayStation Portable
MLB 07: The Show	May 15, 2007 (PS3)	David Wright	New York Mets	PlayStation 2, PlayStation 3, PlayStation Portable
MLB 08: The Show	March 4, 2008	Ryan Howard	Philadelphia Phillies	PlayStation 2, PlayStation 3, PlayStation Portable
MLB 09: The Show	March 3, 2009	Dustin Pedroia	Boston Red Sox	PlayStation 2, PlayStation 3, PlayStation Portable
MLB 10: The Show	March 2, 2010	Joe Mauer	Minnesota Twins	PlayStation 2, PlayStation 3, PlayStation Portable
MLB 11: The Show	March 8, 2011	Joe Mauer	Minnesota Twins	PlayStation 2, PlayStation 3, PlayStation Portable
MLB 12: The Show	March 6, 2012	Adrián González	Boston Red Sox	PlayStation 3, PlayStation Vita
MLB 13: The Show	March 5, 2013	Andrew McCutchen	Pittsburgh Pirates	PlayStation 3, PlayStation Vita
MLB 14: The Show	April 1, 2014 (PS3/Vita)	Miguel Cabrera	Detroit Tigers	PlayStation 3, PlayStation 4, PlayStation Vita
MLB 14: The Show	May 6, 2014 (PS4)	Miguel Cabrera	Detroit Tigers	PlayStation 3, PlayStation 4, PlayStation Vita
MLB 15: The Show	March 31, 2015	Yasiel Puig	Los Angeles Dodgers	PlayStation 3, PlayStation 4, PlayStation Vita
MLB The Show 16	March 29, 2016	Josh Donaldson	Toronto Blue Jays	PlayStation 3, PlayStation 4
MLB The Show 17	March 28, 2017	Ken Griffey Jr.	Seattle Mariners	PlayStation 4
MLB The Show 18	March 27, 2018	Aaron Judge	New York Yankees	PlayStation 4
MLB The Show 19	March 26, 2019	Bryce Harper	Philadelphia Phillies	PlayStation 4
MLB The Show 20	March 17, 2020	Javier Báez	Chicago Cubs	PlayStation 4
MLB The Show 21	April 20, 2021	Fernando Tatís Jr.	San Diego Padres	PlayStation 4, PlayStation 5, Xbox One, Xbox Series X/S
MLB The Show 22	April 5, 2022	Shohei Ohtani	Los Angeles Angels	PlayStation 4, PlayStation 5, Xbox One, Xbox Series X/S, Nintendo Switch
MLB The Show 23	March 28, 2023	Jazz Chisholm Jr.	Miami Marlins	PlayStation 4, PlayStation 5, Xbox One, Xbox Series X/S, Nintendo Switch
MLB The Show 24	March 19, 2024	Vladimir Guerrero Jr.	Toronto Blue Jays	PlayStation 4, PlayStation 5, Xbox One, Xbox Series X/S, Nintendo Switch
MLB The Show 25	March 18, 2025	Paul Skenes; Elly De La Cruz; Gunnar Henderson	Pittsburgh Pirates; Cincinnati Reds; Baltimore Orioles	PlayStation 5, Xbox Series X/S, Nintendo Switch
MLB The Show 26	March 17, 2026	Aaron Judge	New York Yankees	PlayStation 5, Xbox Series X/S, Nintendo Switch

=== Special Edition covers ===
Game	Star	Team
MLB The Show 21	Jackie Robinson	Brooklyn Dodgers
MLB The Show 22	Shohei Ohtani	Los Angeles Angels
MLB The Show 23	Derek Jeter	New York Yankees

=== International covers ===
Canada
Game	Star	Team
MLB 12: The Show	José Bautista	Toronto Blue Jays
MLB 13: The Show	José Bautista	Toronto Blue Jays
MLB 14: The Show	Brett Lawrie	Toronto Blue Jays
MLB 15: The Show	Russell Martin	Toronto Blue Jays
MLB The Show 16	Josh Donaldson	Toronto Blue Jays
MLB The Show 17	Aaron Sanchez	Toronto Blue Jays
MLB The Show 18	Marcus Stroman	Toronto Blue Jays

Korea
Game	Star	Team
MLB 06: The Show	Chan Ho Park	San Diego Padres
MLB 14: The Show	Shin-Soo Choo	Texas Rangers
MLB 15: The Show	Shin-Soo Choo	Texas Rangers
MLB The Show 16	Jung-ho Kang	Pittsburgh Pirates
MLB The Show 17	Hyun-soo Kim	Baltimore Orioles

Taiwan
Game	Star	Team
MLB 13: The Show	Wei-Yin Chen	Baltimore Orioles
MLB 14: The Show	Wei-Yin Chen	Baltimore Orioles
MLB 15: The Show	Wei-Yin Chen	Baltimore Orioles
MLB The Show 16	Wei-Yin Chen	Miami Marlins
MLB The Show 17	Wei-Yin Chen	Miami Marlins

== Commentators ==
Commentator	06	07	08	09	10	11	12	13	14	15	16	17	18	19	20	21	22	23	24	25	26	Total appearances
Matt Vasgersian	✓	✓	✓	✓	✓	✓	✓	✓	✓	✓	✓	✓	✓	✓	✓	✓	✗	✗	✗	✗	✗	16
Dave Campbell	✓	✓	✓	✓	✓	✓	✓	✗	✗	✗	✗	✗	✗	✗	✗	✗	✗	✗	✗	✗	✗	7
Rex Hudler	✓	✓	✓	✓	✓	✓	✗	✗	✗	✗	✗	✗	✗	✗	✗	✗	✗	✗	✗	✗	✗	6
Eric Karros	✗	✗	✗	✗	✗	✓	✓	✓	✓	✓	✓	✗	✗	✗	✗	✗	✗	✗	✗	✗	✗	6
Steve Lyons	✗	✗	✗	✗	✗	✗	✗	✓	✓	✓	✓	✗	✗	✗	✗	✗	✗	✗	✗	✗	✗	4
Harold Reynolds	✗	✗	✗	✗	✗	✗	✗	✗	✗	✗	✗	✓	✗	✗	✗	✗	✗	✗	✗	✗	✗	1
Dan Plesac	✗	✗	✗	✗	✗	✗	✗	✗	✗	✗	✗	✓	✓	✓	✓	✓	✗	✗	✗	✗	✗	5
Mark DeRosa	✗	✗	✗	✗	✗	✗	✗	✗	✗	✗	✗	✗	✓	✓	✓	✓	✗	✗	✗	✗	✗	4
Heidi Watney	✗	✗	✗	✗	✗	✗	✗	✗	✗	✗	✗	✗	✗	✓	✓	✓	✗	✗	✗	✗	✗	3
Jon Sciambi	✗	✗	✗	✗	✗	✗	✗	✗	✗	✗	✗	✗	✗	✗	✗	✗	✓	✓	✓	✓	✓	5
Chris Singleton	✗	✗	✗	✗	✗	✗	✗	✗	✗	✗	✗	✗	✗	✗	✗	✗	✓	✓	✓	✓	✓	5
Robert Flores	✗	✗	✗	✗	✗	✗	✗	✗	✗	✗	✗	✗	✗	✗	✗	✗	✗	✗	✗	✓	✓	2
Jessica Mendoza	✗	✗	✗	✗	✗	✗	✗	✗	✗	✗	✗	✗	✗	✗	✗	✗	✗	✗	✗	✓	✓	2
Total	3	3	3	3	3	4	3	3	3	3	3	3	3	4	4	4	2	2	2	4	4	

== Reception and sales ==
Year	Game	Sales	Refs.
1997	MLB '98		
1998	MLB '99	2.52 million	
1999	MLB 2000		
2000	MLB 2001		
2001	MLB 2002		
2002	MLB 2003		
2003	MLB 2004	660,000	
2004	MLB 2005	900,000	
2005	MLB 2006	400,000	
2006	MLB 06: The Show	940,000 (PS2), 350,000 (PSP)	
2007	MLB 07: The Show	930,000 (PS2), 280,000 (PS3), 280,000 (PSP)	
2008	MLB 08: The Show	420,000 (PS2), 700,000 (PS3), 330,000 (PSP)	
2009	MLB 09: The Show	330,000 (PS2), 720,000 (PS3), 270,000 (PSP)	
2010	MLB 10: The Show	410,000 (PS2), 730,000 (PS3), 210,000 (PSP)	
2011	MLB 11: The Show	130,000 (PS2), 590,000 (PS3), 180,000 (PSP)	
2012	MLB 12: The Show	930,000 (PS3), 200,000 (PSV)	
2013	MLB 13: The Show	840,000 (PS3), 150,000 (PSV)	
2014	MLB 14: The Show	430,000 (PS3), 730,000 (PS4), 120,000 (PSV)	
2015	MLB 15: The Show	400,000 (PS3), 1.01 million (PS4), 40,000 (PSV)	
2016	MLB The Show 16	380,000 (PS3), 960,000 (PS4)	
2017	MLB The Show 17	1.16 million	
2018	MLB The Show 18	1.06 million	
2019	MLB The Show 19	2.52 million	
2020	MLB The Show 20		
2021	MLB The Show 21	2 million	
2022	MLB The Show 22		
2023	MLB The Show 23		
2024	MLB The Show 24		
2025	MLB The Show 25		
	Total	14.03 million	
