= MLB 13: The Show =

2013 video game

- United States cover art featuring Andrew McCutchen
- Developer: San Diego Studio
- Publisher: Sony Computer Entertainment
- Series: MLB: The Show
- Platforms: PlayStation 3 PlayStation Vita
- Release: NA: March 5, 2013; EU: March 6, 2013; AU: March 6, 2013
- Genre: Sports
- Modes: Single-player, multiplayer

MLB 13: The Show is a 2013 baseball video game developed by San Diego Studio and published by Sony Computer Entertainment for the PlayStation 3 and PlayStation Vita. It is the third installment of the series to be compatible with PlayStation Move. The play-by play is done once again by Matt Vasgersian and Eric Karros along with a new commentator, Steve Lyons.

The standard cover features Pittsburgh Pirates outfielder Andrew McCutchen. In Canada, a separate cover featuring Toronto Blue Jays outfielder José Bautista was released, making it the second consecutive year Bautista was featured on the cover in Canada.

An expansion pack exclusive to PlayStation 3, called MLB 13: The Show - Home Run Derby, was released on July 2, 2013.

== New Features ==
- Postseason mode, allowing players to play through a full MLB postseason, complete with realistic postseason atmosphere.
- New color commentator Steve Lyons joins broadcast booth, replacing Dave Campbell.
- Hitting enhancements, such as push/pull hitting trajectories engine
- Diamond Dynasty Improvements: new card types, designated hitter option
- Road To The Show (RTTS): new mode-specific presentation
- New player development and budgeting systems in Season and Franchise modes
- Fielding throwing meters

=== Online features ===
These features depended on the PlayStation Network

- Universal online profile
- Cross-platform online Home Run Derby
- The Show Live: allows players to play along with real-life MLB schedule with updated stats, rosters, and commentary.
- Online leagues overhaul: ability to play real schedule of all 30 MLB teams, and ability to control pace of league.
- Road To The Show (RTTS): new RTTS online leaderboards
- Challenge of the Week Real-time leaderboard

In August 2014, Sony announced they were shutting down the online servers, so people are no longer able to play online features, but the players can continue playing the offline features.

== Reception ==
Reception

Aggregate score
Aggregator	Score	
Aggregator	PS Vita	PS3
Metacritic	75/100	87/100

Review scores
Publication	Score	
Publication	PS Vita	PS3
Electronic Gaming Monthly	N/A	7/10
Game Informer	N/A	8.75/10
GameRevolution	N/A	4/5
GameSpot	7.5/10	8.5/10
GameTrailers	N/A	8.5/10
GameZone	N/A	9/10
IGN	7.6/10	8.8/10
Joystiq	N/A	5/5
PlayStation Official Magazine – UK	N/A	9/10
Polygon	N/A	8.5/10
Sports Illustrated	N/A	9/10
Toronto Sun	N/A	4.5/5

The game received "generally favorable reviews" on both platforms according to the review aggregation website Metacritic.

Sports Illustrated gave the PS3 version a score of nine out of ten and said that it was "consistently successful because it's loaded with options that allow you to play the brand of baseball you want, and at a skill level you can handle." Toronto Sun gave it a similar score of four-and-a-half stars out of five and said that it "pulls no squeeze plays on quality and realism when it comes to the game of baseball." The Digital Fix gave it a score of eight out of ten and said, "For those unfamiliar with baseball MLB 13: The Show is probably a curiosity at most. The fact that the game is also PlayStation exclusive further segregates its European audience so that it occupies a limited niche at best. Still, for those looking for a baseball game there is nothing better on the market."

During the 17th Annual D.I.C.E. Awards, the Academy of Interactive Arts & Sciences nominated MLB 13: The Show for "Sports Game of the Year".
