= MLB 11: The Show =

2011 video game

- PlayStation 3 cover art featuring Joe Mauer
- Developer: San Diego Studio
- Publisher: Sony Computer Entertainment
- Series: MLB: The Show
- Platforms: PlayStation 2 PlayStation 3 PlayStation Portable
- Release: NA: March 8, 2011
- Genre: Sports
- Modes: Single-player, multiplayer

MLB 11: The Show is a 2011 baseball video game developed by San Diego Studio and published by Sony Computer Entertainment for the PlayStation 2, PlayStation 3 and PlayStation Portable. The game includes all 30 MLB teams, rosters, and stadiums from the 2011 season. This is the final installment in the series available for the PlayStation 2 and the PSP, and the first game in the series to be compatible with PlayStation Move for use with the PlayStation 3. It is also the final PlayStation 2 game to be released by Sony in North America.

== New features ==
=== PlayStation 3 ===
MLB 11: The Show features the Pure Analog Control System, which includes analog controls for hitting, pitching, and fielding. Pure Hitting allows the player to stride and swing using the Right Analog Stick, Pure Pitching functionality incorporates a new Pitch Meter when setting strength and location, and Pure Throwing can be used to make defensive throws by simply pointing the Right Analog Stick in the direction of the base, also allowing for fake throws to keep runners honest.

The Co-op Mode allows up to four-player offline or online cooperative play where players can split duties covering either the infield or outfield, while also switching off at the plate or choosing the specific batters they’d like to control. Users can play 1 vs. 2, 2 vs. 2, or 2 vs. CPU. There is also a Challenge of the Week online feature, which will include 2-3 minute single player online gameplay, which will be supported by leader boards and prizes awarded in three tiers.

The fifth generation of Road to The Show adds a new interactive slider set to the Create Player process, new training modes triggered by the Player Performance Evaluator, Minor League substitution logic improvements, advancement system improvements that now compares a player's stats to their competition in the organization, and the new No Assist Fielding option.

MLB 11: The Show also includes stereoscopic 3D functionality, a customizable camera editor, stadium specific broadcast camera angles for all 30 MLB teams, new weather elements, stadium specific Jumbotrons and fireworks, and PlayStation Move motion controller support for the Home Run Derby mode.

=== PlayStation 2 ===
The PlayStation 2 version also featured co-op play and updated rosters, but did not receive the updated Road to the Show, analog control or the Challenge of the Week feature. The controls stay the same as MLB 10: The Show's and Road to the Show continues with the advancement goals and in-game goals. Also, Eric Karros did not replace Rex Hudler in the PlayStation 2 version. Some features have also notably been removed from the PlayStation 3 version despite being in the earlier PS2 installments, such as the bullpen meter that states whether or not a relief pitcher is warmed up.

=== PlayStation Portable ===
The PlayStation Portable version features tweaked artificial intelligence, the updated Road to the Show, revamped animation, and a Rivalry Mode, as well as updated rosters. This is the last game in the series to be produced for the PlayStation Portable.

== Cover athlete ==
For the second year in a row, Minnesota Twins catcher Joe Mauer is the cover athlete. In 2012, he was replaced by Adrián González and José Bautista.

== Demo ==
A demo was released on February 22, featuring a minimum four inning day game rematch of 2010 World Series (game can go into extra innings), between the Texas Rangers and San Francisco Giants at AT&T Park.

== Commentators ==
New to the MLB 11 The Show broadcast booth is former Los Angeles Dodgers first baseman Eric Karros—replacing Rex Hudler—who joins franchise veterans Matt Vasgersian and Dave Campbell to complete the three man crew. However, Hudler is retained in the PS2 version.

== Reception ==
Reception

Aggregate score
Aggregator	Score		
Aggregator	PS2	PS3	PSP
Metacritic	75/100	90/100	77/100

Review scores
Publication	Score		
Publication	PS2	PS3	PSP
1Up.com	N/A	A−	A−
Destructoid	N/A	8.5/10	N/A
Game Informer	N/A	9.25/10	N/A
GamePro	N/A	5/5	N/A
GameSpot	N/A	8/10	7/10
GameTrailers	N/A	9/10	N/A
GameZone	N/A	8.5/10	N/A
IGN	N/A	8/10	N/A
PlayStation Official Magazine – UK	N/A	10/10	N/A
PlayStation: The Official Magazine	N/A	10/10	N/A
411Mania	N/A	8.5/10	7/10

The PlayStation 3 version received "universal acclaim", while the PlayStation 2 and PSP versions received "generally favorable reviews", according to the review aggregation website Metacritic.

GameZone said of the PS3 version: "The barrier to entry may be a little high for newer baseball sim gamers, but with a little persistence and plenty of practice, you’ll find yourself in love with MLB 11: The Show."

During the 15th Annual Interactive Achievement Awards, the Academy of Interactive Arts & Sciences nominated MLB 11: The Show for "Sports Game of the Year".

== Soundtrack ==
Artist	Song
311	Beautiful Disaster
Big Pun	100%
Cults	Go Outside
Edgar Winter Group	Free Ride
Funeral Party	New York City Moves to the Sound of L.A.
Manchester Orchestra	I've Got Friends
MGMT	Congratulations (Erol Alkan Remix)
Passion Pit	Little Secrets
The Rassle	Wild Ones
The Scissors	Let's Go
The Temper Trap	Fader (Adam Freeland Remix)

== See also ==
- Major League Baseball 2K11
- MLB 10: The Show
- MLB 12: The Show
