= MLB The Show 20 =

2020 video game

- Developer: San Diego Studio
- Publisher: Sony Interactive Entertainment
- Series: MLB: The Show
- Platform: PlayStation 4
- Release: March 17, 2020
- Genre: Sports
- Modes: Single-player, multiplayer

MLB The Show 20 is a 2020 baseball video game developed by San Diego Studio and published by Sony Interactive Entertainment for the PlayStation 4. It is the fifteenth installment in the MLB: The Show series and the last to be a PlayStation exclusive, as its successor MLB The Show 21 was released on Xbox consoles while MLB The Show 22 was released on the Nintendo Switch. Customers that digitally pre-ordered the game were received the game early on March 13. Chicago Cubs infielder Javier Báez is featured as the cover star.

Upon release, MLB The Show 20 was generally well-received by critics, who praised the new fielding and hitting mechanics, and new features in the Diamond Dynasty mode, while criticism was given to technical issues at launch.

== Gameplay ==
For the first time ever, Minor League Baseball players are fully licensed and have their names and likenesses featured in the game. In previous versions of the game, Minor League players were not licensed and were replaced with generic players. As well, the team and logo editor that were previously exclusive to Diamond Dynasty were brought over to the game's Franchise mode. Matt Vasgersian, Mark DeRosa & Dan Plesac return as play-by-play commentators; Heidi Watney returns as sideline reporter and Alex Miniak returns as public address commentator.

== Development ==
New features in the game included online modes such as "Showdown" and "Custom Leagues". "Showdown" is a mode that begins with a player selected in a draft, and it will use in the "Moments" mode. The "Custom Leagues" mode is another online-only mode that using the choice of 40-man live MLB roster or create a custom team from the MLB The Show's "Diamond Dynasty" mode.

Returning modes included "Franchise Mode" (in which the player can take control of any MLB team over the course of several seasons, but with the new customized team and logo creator and franchise relocation option, in which the player will create a team, the team's logo or relocate the team to designated location), "Road to the Show" (in which the user creates a new player and plays out his career through Double-A, Triple-A and the majors), "March To October" (in which the player will select the team for a full MLB season through the regular season, the All-Star Game, the playoffs, and the World Series), and "Moments" (which the user relive and recreate famous moments in MLB history).

In addition, the game featured real-life, fully licensed Minor League Baseball players for the first time in the series, unlike in previous games where the real players were not licensed and were replaced with generic players, in conjunction with Scott Spindler and his Ridin Rosters group.

The game features the new Nike uniforms for the first time, previous games formerly used Majestic Athletic as their uniform supplier.

The game also included real-life and authentic stadium advertisements for the first time, previous games in the series did not include authentic stadium advertisements and replaced it with fake brands. Advertisements for Chevrolet, Chick-fil-A, Coca-Cola, Citgo, Delta Air Lines, John Hancock Insurance, PNC Bank, and Wintrust Financial could now be seen in these selected stadiums within the game.

== Reception ==
Reception

Aggregate scores
Aggregator	Score
Metacritic	83/100
OpenCritic	93% recommend

Review scores
Publication	Score
Game Informer	8.75/10
GameSpot	8/10
IGN	8/10

MLB The Show 20 received "generally favorable reviews" from critics, according to the review aggregation website Metacritic. Fellow review aggregator OpenCritic assessed that the game received "mighty" approval, being recommended by 93% of critics.

In its 8.7/10 review, IGN wrote: "MLB The Show 20 isn't the biggest upgrade the series has ever seen, but it's a solid one with a few good highlights and no real downsides." Game Informer gave the game 8.75/10, praising its new hitting and fielding mechanics and new features in Diamond Dynasty, "Another good outing for the series, complete with additions across the board and gameplay that emphasizes skill." GameSpot gave the game 8/10, praising the fielding and hitting mechanics, but criticizing the new custom teams and Online Leagues additions.

During the 24th Annual D.I.C.E. Awards, the Academy of Interactive Arts & Sciences nominated MLB The Show 20 for "Sports Game of the Year".
