= MLB The Show 24 =

2024 video game

- Cover art featuring Vladimir Guerrero Jr.
- Developer: San Diego Studio
- Publishers: Sony Interactive Entertainment (Note: Distributor for non-PlayStation versions); MLB Advanced Media (Note: Non-PlayStation versions)
- Series: MLB: The Show
- Platforms: Nintendo Switch; PlayStation 4; PlayStation 5; Xbox One; Xbox Series X/S
- Release: March 19, 2024
- Genre: Sports
- Modes: Single-player, multiplayer

MLB The Show 24 is a 2024 baseball video game developed by San Diego Studio and published by Sony Interactive Entertainment. The nineteenth installment in the MLB: The Show series, it was released for Nintendo Switch, PlayStation 4, PlayStation 5, Xbox One and Xbox Series X/S. It features Vladimir Guerrero Jr. on its cover. For the first time in MLB The Show history, the PlayStation 4 and Xbox One versions will not have a physical game as both of these versions are digital only.

== Gameplay ==
Gameplay additions include roughly 400 new animations and logic improvements, 4 more pinpoint pitching gestures, and additions in line with Major League Baseball rule changes for the new season, such as the Pitch clock, and bigger base sizes.

For the first time in baseball video game history, the game includes a career mode with female players, dubbed Road to the Show: Women Pave Their Way.

Storylines: The Negro Leagues returns in MLB The Show 24, now including Buck Leonard, Josh Gibson, Hank Aaron, Willie Mays, Larry Doby, and Toni Stone, the first ever woman player to be added to the game, at launch. Negro Leagues legends Andy Cooper, Rap Dixon, Bill Foster, Leon Day, and José Méndez have since been added to the game and have their own storylines. A separate Storylines mode is also dedicated to Derek Jeter's career.

Alex Miniak returns as public address commentator, with Jon Sciambi and Chris Singleton return as play-by-play commentators. Dan O'Dowd and Sarah Langs serve as commentators in Road to the Show mode.

=== Diamond Dynasty ===
MLB The Show 24's Diamond Dynasty mode uses a "Sets and Seasons" content structure, grouping player cards into timed Sets tied to in-game Seasons that govern Ranked play eligibility, alongside a permanently-eligible Core pool and a limited number of "Wild Card" slots for cards from older Sets. New Diamond Dynasty content for the year included player cards earned via Storylines: The Negro Leagues Season 2 (featuring Josh Gibson, Buck Leonard, Hank Aaron, and Toni Stone) and a dedicated Derek Jeter Storyline featuring signature moments from his early Yankees career. The mode's card catalog spans approximately 3,600 player cards across the 30 MLB rosters alongside retired legends and signature releases, with roughly 1,470 cards reaching the top Diamond rarity tier.

== Reception ==
The PlayStation 5 and Xbox Series X versions of MLB The Show 24 both received "generally favorable" reviews from critics, according to the review aggregation website Metacritic. In Japan, four critics from Famitsu gave the game a total score of 29 out of 40.

=== Accolades ===
Year	Ceremony	Category	Result	Ref.
2025	28th Annual D.I.C.E. Awards	Sports Game of the Year	Won	
