= MLB The Show 26 =

2026 baseball video game

- Cover art featuring Aaron Judge
- Developer: San Diego Studio
- Publishers: Sony Interactive Entertainment (Note: Distributor for non-PlayStation consoles); MLB Advanced Media (Note: Non-PlayStation consoles)
- Series: MLB: The Show
- Platforms: Nintendo Switch; PlayStation 5; Xbox Series X/S
- Release: March 17, 2026
- Genre: Sports

MLB The Show 26 is a baseball video game developed by San Diego Studio and published by Sony Interactive Entertainment. It is the twenty-first installment in the MLB: The Show series and was released on March 17, 2026, for the Nintendo Switch, PlayStation 5, and Xbox Series X/S.

== Gameplay ==
MLB The Show 26 retained the series' established on-field mechanics while introducing smaller changes. The new Automated Ball-Strike System (ABS) allows players to challenge/contest selected pitch calls during play.

=== Road to the Show ===
The single-player career mode, Road to the Show, was expanded to begin with high school and college baseball before the professional draft. The mode also includes the licensed NCAA Men's College World Series and includes 16 new teams. It also includes systems related to player legacy, trade requests, position changes, and free agency decisions later in a created player's career.

=== Diamond Dynasty ===
The card-collecting mode, Diamond Dynasty, returned with interface changes and revised card progression systems. There is a new "Red Diamond" card tier and changes to the "Parallel XP" system. The mode also incorporates content tied to the World Baseball Classic, including a Mini-Seasons tournament using international venues such as the Tokyo Dome and Hiram Bithorn Stadium.

Returning Diamond Dynasty modes include Ranked play with 1v1 and co-op (2v2/3v3) ladders, Battle Royale draft-based events, and Weekend Classic tournaments, alongside seasonal Programs offering player rewards through XP-based progression paths and Diamond Quest map-based events.

=== Other game modes ===
Storylines: The Negro Leagues returned for a fourth time, continuing the game's historical mode focused on players from the Negro leagues. Franchise mode received changes centered on roster management and trading, along with the addition of a "Trade Hub" and revised trade logic intended to make deals develop over time rather than resolve immediately.

Stadium Creator allows players to build custom ballparks with adjustable dimensions and share them with other users through the in-game Vault, where they can be downloaded and equipped in Diamond Dynasty.

== Presentation and rosters ==
Pre-match presentation in MLB The Show 26

MLB The Show 26 features an expanded commentary team. Alongside returning commentators Boog Sciambi and Chris Singleton, Jessica Mendoza provides commentary for the college baseball segments of Road to the Show, while Robert Flores appears in commentary segments tied to Diamond Dynasty.

The game added more than 40 historical legends to its roster, including Albert Pujols, Dustin Pedroia, Andruw Jones, Félix Hernández, and Roy Campanella. While also removing more then 20 notable players from its roster, including Frank Thomas, Rickey Henderson, Jim Palmer, Fernando Valenzuela, and Todd Helton. Additional players were introduced through Storylines: The Negro Leagues, including John Henry "Pop" Lloyd, Mamie "Peanut" Johnson, and George "Mule" Suttles. New York Yankees outfielder Aaron Judge is the cover athlete, marking his second appearance on the cover of an MLB: The Show title after MLB The Show 18. As part of the game's "Takeover" event, Kansas City Royals shortstop Bobby Witt Jr. and Toronto Blue Jays infielder Ernie Clement also appeared on the cover.

== Release ==
MLB The Show 26 was released worldwide on March 17, 2026. It was published for the Nintendo Switch, PlayStation 5, and Xbox Series X/S. Early access began on March 13, 2026 for the players who purchased special editions of the game.

== Reception ==
Reception

Aggregate scores
Aggregator	Score
Metacritic	(PS5) 72/100
OpenCritic	62% recommend (Note: Based on 26 reviews)

Review score
Publication	Score
Shacknews	7/10

MLB The Show 26 received a score of 72/100 on the review aggregation site Metacritic for the PlayStation 5 version, indicating "mixed or average" reception. Fellow review aggregator OpenCritic assessed that the game received strong approval, being recommended by 62% of critics.

Shacknews noted that many of the broader gameplay changes were limited in scope when compared with earlier entries in the series, while adding that The Negro Leagues are one of the strongest recurring parts of the series. Kotaku described fielding in Road to the Show as one of the less engaging parts of the game because long stretches of play can pass without a ball being hit to the user's player.

Reviewers generally described the presentation as polished but familiar. Kotaku wrote that the game continued to recreate the look and feel of televised baseball effectively, while Shacknews said the series' visuals were beginning to show their age despite smaller additions to presentation and stadium effects.

== See also ==
- List of baseball video games
