= Sarah Langs =

American sportswriter (born 1993)

- Born: May 2, 1993 (age 33); Upper East Side, Manhattan, New York City, U.S
- Employer: MLB.com

Sarah Langs (born May 2, 1993) is an American sportswriter and podcaster. She currently writes for MLB.com and is known for her command of baseball history and statistics. She co-hosts the podcast Ballpark Dimensions with colleague Mandy Bell.

== Early life ==
Langs became interested in baseball as a child growing up in New York City's Upper East Side and watching the New York Mets. She gained an affection for the San Francisco Giants from her mother. Conversations about sports and statistics were common in her household.

Langs graduated from the Dalton School in Manhattan in 2011. She then studied comparative human development at the University of Chicago and wrote about sports for The Chicago Maroon. She interned at the New York Post, Newsweek and The Daily Beast before an internship with Sportsnet New York gave her the opportunity to pitch and write research-based sports stories about the Mets.

Langs' mother is Liise-anne Pirofski, chief of infectious diseases at Albert Einstein College of Medicine and Montefiore Medical Center. Her father, Charles Langs, is a nephrologist at NYU Langone Health.

== Career ==
After graduating in 2015, Langs remained in Chicago, writing research pieces about the Chicago Cubs and Chicago White Sox for NBC Sports Chicago. ESPN soon hired her as a researcher. She supported the hosts of Baseball Tonight with statistics and other historical information.

In 2017, Buster Olney urged Langs to appear on the Baseball Tonight podcast, which led to regular appearances on the podcast and on air. MLB.com hired Langs in 2019, though she continues to work behind the scenes on ESPN broadcasts and appear on Olney's podcast.

In 2021, she served as an on-air analyst as part of Major League Baseball's first all-female broadcast crew, alongside Heidi Watney, Lauren Gardner, Melanie Newman and Alanna Rizzo, calling a YouTube Game of the Week featuring the Baltimore Orioles and Tampa Bay Rays at Tropicana Field. Langs, Watney, Gardner, Newman and Rizzo signed a baseball that was sent to the National Baseball Hall of Fame.

In January 2023, the Baseball Writers' Association of America honored Langs with the Casey Stengel "You Could Look It Up" Award, which is typically presented to someone the group has not otherwise recognized.

Langs recorded commentary and filmed studio segments for Road to the Show mode in MLB The Show 24.

== Personal life ==
Langs is in a relationship with Matt Williams, an NBA researcher for ESPN.

=== Illness ===
Langs, an avid runner, first noticed an unexplained limp in 2019. In early 2020, she saw an orthopedist, believing that it was an ankle injury. In 2021, Langs was diagnosed with amyotrophic lateral sclerosis, a progressive and terminal illness affecting motor function, often now referred to as Lou Gehrig's Disease. She revealed her diagnosis just before the 2022 Major League Baseball postseason. She has continued to work for MLB.com and record podcasts, doing so mostly from home. She has credited her work and the baseball community with helping her to cope with her diagnosis.

Langs ran three half-marathons while experiencing symptoms of what doctors later determined to be ALS.

Since announcing her diagnosis, Langs has highlighted nonprofits and research efforts related to ALS. On her birthday in May 2023, she launched #FistBumps4ALS, a fundraising effort for Project ALS similar to the Ice Bucket Challenge. As of May 20, the effort had raised more than $25,000 from donors including Karl Ravech, Jeff Passan and Jon "Boog" Sciambi. Charles Barkley highlighted the fundraising effort during an Inside the NBA broadcast.

On June 2, 2023, which MLB recognizes as Lou Gehrig Day, the league and its teams recognized Langs. The league and its teams partnered with Project ALS, and the league auctioned 30 bats signed by players selected by Langs, with proceeds to benefit the Healey Center for ALS at Massachusetts General Hospital. The Mets honored Langs at a pregame ceremony and, through their foundation, donated $10,000 to Project ALS in her name. The Arizona Diamondbacks donated $25,000 to Project ALS.

ESPN published a commentary in which Langs reflected on all the love she had been shown since she made her diagnosis public, and reflected on what Gehrig told fans in the famous speech he delivered as he left baseball.

The New York Yankees honored her on July 4, 2023, the anniversary of Lou Gehrig's "Luckiest Man" speech. She tried on a cap worn by Gehrig and held his bat. Her parents threw out ceremonial first pitches.

She was honored by the Philadelphia Phillies on Lou Gehrig Day on June 2, 2024 and told ESPN during the game broadcast that she is overwhelmed with the support she has received.

In March 2025, she began using a cloned voice generated by ElevenLabs for podcast appearances and other public engagements.
