= MLB 15: The Show =

2015 video game

- United States cover art featuring Yasiel Puig
- Developer: San Diego Studio
- Publisher: Sony Computer Entertainment
- Series: MLB: The Show
- Platforms: PlayStation 3 PlayStation 4 PlayStation Vita
- Release: March 31, 2015
- Genre: Sports
- Modes: Single-player, multiplayer

MLB 15: The Show is a 2015 baseball video game developed by San Diego Studio and published by Sony Computer Entertainment for the PlayStation 3, PlayStation 4 and PlayStation Vita. It is the tenth installment in the MLB: The Show series and the last to be released for the PlayStation Vita.

Matt Vasgersian, Eric Karros, and Steve Lyons return as commentators. Mike Carlucci returns as public address announcer. Legends can be used as free agents in the Franchise and Season modes in the game.

On October 31, 2017, Sony decommissioned the game's online servers.

== New features ==
The game adds licensed equipment, including fielding gloves, batting gloves, cleats and bats.

=== Year to Year Saves ===
Players who purchased MLB 14: The Show will be able to transfer their Franchise, Road to the Show and Postseason Mode progress into MLB 15: The Show, and continue where they previously left off. Players who have save data from the PS3 version of MLB 14: The Show will also be able to carry the data over to the PS4 version of MLB 15: The Show, and vice versa.

=== Universal Rewards ===
The game also features a brand new universal rewards system, which allows players to earn cards and stubs by playing any game mode. Rewards include player cards for use in the game's fantasy baseball mode, "Diamond Dynasty", as well as equipment, sponsorships or stadiums. Other features include a new "Community Market" where players can buy and sell cards using Stubs.

== Cover athletes ==
On December 6, 2014, it was announced that Los Angeles Dodgers outfielder Yasiel Puig would be on the game's standard cover. On February 5, 2015, it was announced that Toronto Blue Jays catcher Russell Martin would feature on the Canadian retail release of the game's cover.

== Reception ==
Reception

Aggregate scores
Aggregator	Score
GameRankings	81% (PS4); 71% (VITA)
Metacritic	80/100 (PS4)

Review scores
Publication	Score
Destructoid	7/10
Game Informer	8/10
GameSpot	8/10
GamesRadar+	4/5
GameTrailers	8.3/10
IGN	8.5/10
Polygon	9/10
Hardcore Gamer	4/5

MLB 15: The Show received "generally favorable" reviews upon release. The PlayStation 4 version of the game received an aggregated score of 81% on GameRankings based on 29 reviews and 80/100 on Metacritic based on 37 reviews. The PlayStation Vita version holds a 71% score on GameRankings.

Before the game's initial release, Sony did not provide review copies of the game for critical reviews. According to a Sony representative, the reason for the delay was "due to this year's flagship Universal Rewards feature, which will require active servers to function." Review copies were distributed on the public release date, March 31.

During the 19th Annual D.I.C.E. Awards, the Academy of Interactive Arts & Sciences nominated MLB 15: The Show for "Sports Game of the Year".

== Soundtrack ==
Artist	Song
Until the Ribbon Breaks	A Taste of Silver
Conway	Attack
Interpol	Everything Is Wrong
Lack of Afro	Freedom (feat. Jack Tyson-Charles)
Porter Robinson	Fresh Static Snow
Stillwater Giants	Ingredients
Bass Drum of Death	Left For Dead
Zodiac Death Valley	Love the Lie
Death From Above 1979	Nothin' Left
Spoon	Rent I Pay
Harry Fraud	Skye Right (feat. Sharks)
