= MLB The Show 23 =

2023 sports videogame

- Cover art featuring Jazz Chisholm Jr.
- Developer: San Diego Studio
- Publishers: Sony Interactive Entertainment (Note: Distributor for non-PlayStation versions); MLB Advanced Media (Note: Non-PlayStation versions)
- Series: MLB: The Show
- Platforms: Nintendo Switch; PlayStation 4; PlayStation 5; Xbox One; Xbox Series X/S
- Release: March 28, 2023
- Genre: Sports
- Modes: Single-player, multiplayer

MLB The Show 23 is a baseball video game developed by San Diego Studio and published by Sony Interactive Entertainment. The eighteenth installment in the MLB: The Show, it is available on the Nintendo Switch, PlayStation 4, PlayStation 5, Xbox One, and Xbox Series X/S. Miami Marlins player Jazz Chisholm Jr. is featured as the cover star, while The Captain Edition of the game features retired New York Yankees player Derek Jeter.

For the third consecutive year, the Xbox versions of the game are available for Xbox Game Pass subscribers at no additional cost.

Alex Miniak returns as public address commentator, with Jon Sciambi and Chris Singleton returning as play-by-play commentators.

== Gameplay ==
The game includes a new game mode, named Storylines: A New Game Experience. Season 1 focuses on the Negro Leagues, featuring eight historical players — Satchel Paige, Jackie Robinson, Rube Foster, Hilton Smith, Hank Thompson, John Donaldson, Martín Dihigo, and Buck O'Neil — with narration by Bob Kendrick, president of the Negro Leagues Baseball Museum, as part of a multi-year partnership.

Other changes included Core Seasons in Diamond Dynasty, which would allow for 99 overall players to be obtained from day one, which take place every 6–8 weeks. For every new Core Season, only the players featured on that and the previous season can be used in Ranked and Conquest, plus players in the CORE set, which are always eligible. This, however, doesn't affect other game modes in Diamond Dynasty, such as Play vs CPU. Another new addition is Captain Cards, in which once a certain tier requirement is met by building a team with players that Captain Card player specifies, such as players from certain seasons, teams, or having certain attributes, it boosts your team significantly. Proper two-way play was also implemented in this release; this makes it possible for players such as Shohei Ohtani to be used as both a starting pitcher and as a true designated hitter.

Diamond Dynasty's card catalog for MLB The Show 23 grew to over 4,000 player cards across the game's content cycle, with approximately 1,900 cards reaching the top Diamond rarity tier.

== Reception ==
Reception

Aggregate score
Aggregator	Score
Metacritic	PS5: 82/100; XSXS: 84/100; NS: 83/100

Review scores
Publication	Score
Game Informer	8.75/10
GameSpot	8/10
IGN	9/10
Nintendo Life	7/10 stars
Nintendo World Report	9/10
Shacknews	8/10

The game received "generally favorable" reviews from critics according to review aggregator Metacritic.

=== Accolades ===
Year	Ceremony	Category	Result	Ref.
2024	27th Annual D.I.C.E. Awards	Sports Game of the Year	Won	
