= MLB 12: The Show =

2012 video game

- MLB 12: The Show covers, featuring Adrián González of the Boston Red Sox (left, American cover) and José Bautista of the Toronto Blue Jays (right, Canadian cover)
- Developer: San Diego Studio
- Publisher: Sony Computer Entertainment
- Series: MLB: The Show
- Platforms: PlayStation 3 PlayStation Vita
- Release: NA: March 6, 2012
- Genre: Sports
- Modes: Single-player, multiplayer

MLB 12: The Show is a 2012 baseball video game developed by San Diego Studio and published by Sony Computer Entertainment for the PlayStation 3 and PlayStation Vita. It is also the second installment of the series to be compatible with PlayStation Move and the first to be released on the PlayStation Vita.

Adrián González, first baseman of the Boston Red Sox, was awarded the title of cover athlete after he batted .338 with 27 home runs and 117 runs batted in during the 2011 season. González is the third Red Sox player to be awarded the cover, the first being David Ortiz for MLB 06: The Show, and the second being Dustin Pedroia for MLB 09: The Show, however, González was traded to the Dodgers halfway through the 2012 season making the cover outdated while the season was still going on.

On January 23, 2012, it was reported that there would be a separate cover for Canadian buyers, with Toronto Blue Jays right fielder/third baseman José Bautista on the cover. Bautista batted .302 with 43 home runs and 103 runs batted in during the 2011 season.

This marks the first year where the game is not developed for the PlayStation 2 or PlayStation Portable. However, it's the first installment of the series on Sony's newer handheld, the PlayStation Vita.

A commercial for the game involves the city of Chicago celebrating after the Cubs win the World Series at Wrigley Field, ending the longest drought championship drought in MLB history of what it could've been 104 years, and then it is revealed that the moment is played out on the game itself. (Four years later, the real Cubs won the Series, but clinched on the road at Progressive Field in Cleveland, not in their home ballpark.)

== Reception ==
Reception

Aggregate score
Aggregator	Score	
Aggregator	PS Vita	PS3
Metacritic	76/100	87/100

Review scores
Publication	Score	
Publication	PS Vita	PS3
Destructoid	8.5/10	7.5/10
Game Informer	8/10	8.75/10
GameRevolution	N/A	4/5
GameSpot	6.5/10	7.5/10
GameTrailers	N/A	9.2/10
GameZone	N/A	8/10
IGN	8/10	8.5/10
Joystiq	4.5/5	4.5/5
PlayStation Official Magazine – UK	8/10	10/10
PlayStation: The Official Magazine	8/10	9/10
411Mania	7.5/10	8/10
New York Post	N/A	A−

The game received "generally favorable reviews" on both platforms according to the review aggregation website Metacritic.

During the 16th Annual D.I.C.E. Awards, the Academy of Interactive Arts & Sciences nominated MLB 12: The Show for "Sports Game of the Year".
