= MLB The Show 17 =

2017 video game

- United States cover art featuring Ken Griffey Jr.
- Developer: San Diego Studio
- Publisher: Sony Interactive Entertainment
- Series: MLB: The Show
- Platform: PlayStation 4
- Release: March 28, 2017
- Genre: Sports
- Modes: Single-player, multiplayer

MLB The Show 17 is a 2017 baseball video game developed by San Diego Studio and published by Sony Interactive Entertainment for the PlayStation 4. It is the twelfth installment in the MLB: The Show series and the first to be exclusive on a single console. The American cover features Ken Griffey Jr. (who had been inducted into the National Baseball Hall of Fame the previous year), while Aaron Sanchez is the cover athlete for the Canadian version, and Wei-Yin Chen is on the Taiwanese cover.

MLB The Show 17, like the previous games in the series, is based on the sport of baseball; more specifically, it simulates the experience of MLB. Several game modes are included, such as "Road to The Show", in which the player creates a customizable player and plays throughout their career to the major leagues; "Franchise", in which the player controls an entire organization; and "Diamond Dynasty", in which the player creates a team of random players to compete against other players' teams.

While Matt Vasgersian returns for The Show 17, commentary from Harold Reynolds and Dan Plesac replaced Eric Karros and Steve Lyons. Mike Carlucci returns as public-address commentator. MLB The Show 17 features three presentation themes: MLB Network, which features similar presentation to actual MLB Network broadcasts; Theme 1, which is used for other MLB games; and Theme 2, which is used primarily for Minor League Baseball games.

MLB The Show 17 was released to positive reviews. Most critics praised the presentation and visuals, as well as the gameplay and amount of different game modes, all of which have hours of content. However, some critics still experienced online technical issues and game bugs.

== New features ==
New features include MLB The Show 17's "Road to the Show" story mode, "Pave Your Path", in which the user controls the progression of their player's career. The mode intercuts scenes that present the player with decisions that affect the storyline.

MLB The Show 17 also added features to other pre-existing game modes like "Franchise" and "Diamond Dynasty". Franchise mode places the user in control of an entire MLB team, including coaching, player development, and general-manager duties. New to this mode are features that allow the player to maintain the same level of control of their team but do it in less time than in previous iterations. Other additions include critical situations, in which the user only plays important at-bats in late innings of games, and quick manage, in which the user is in complete control of all managerial decisions during a game.

As in previous versions, "Diamond Dynasty" involves building the ultimate baseball team and maintaining a virtual trading-card collection. The user creates a customized team, selecting the players (current and past), a team name, logo, and uniforms. Games are played in tournament-style competitions against other users' teams. Additional legendary baseball players have been added to collect, new missions to complete, and live updated 2017 Topps player cards.

== Release ==
On December 3, 2016, MLB The Show 17 was announced with a trailer for the game that showed the game's release date along with new features. It was released worldwide on March 28, 2017, for PlayStation 4. This was the first time since MLB 06: The Show that the game was not released for the PlayStation 3. There were four different versions of the game to purchase: Standard Edition, MVP Edition, Hall of Fame Edition, and Digital Deluxe Edition. If players purchase the Hall of Fame Edition of the game, they receive the Steel Book case cover, several physical items, such as a limited edition New Era Hat, based on the modified version of the MLB logo with the hat on backwards to match Ken Griffey Jr.'s style, and many in-game bonuses.

== Reception ==
Reception

Aggregate score
Aggregator	Score
Metacritic	85/100

Review scores
Publication	Score
Electronic Gaming Monthly	9/10
Game Informer	9/10
GameSpot	8/10
GamesRadar+	4/5
IGN	9.5/10
Polygon	8/10

MLB The Show 17 received "generally favorable" reviews from critics, according to review aggregator Metacritic.

Ray Carsillo from Electronic Gaming Monthly enjoyed the game, giving a score of 9/10. Carsillo said The Show 17 added depth onto Franchise and Road to The Show modes "sets a new pinnacle for the franchise". He also praised how the game looked, with smoother animations, new character face models, and three brand-new presentation packages. His only negatives revolve around some online issues and glitches that still continue to plague the series at launch.

Andrew Reiner of Game Informer gave the game an overall score of 9 out 10 saying "MLB The Show 17 is an ambitious game that tries to dazzle players with new avenues of play and a story, but is at its best on the field, where the action has never looked or played better."

Richard Wakeling from GameSpot gave the game an 8 out of 10 and praised the gameplay stating "the action on the field has never been better, with smarter fielding AI, and enhanced ball physics that bring the hitting to life." Wakeling criticized the commentary as "stilted" and noted the game had a few "blemishes lurking throughout," but found those problems detracted little from the overall experience saying the product overall "is America's National Pastime at its best".

GamesRadar's Ben Wilson gave the game a final score of 4 out of 5. Wilson enjoyed the game's polish and controls stating "Plays, looks and feels just like real baseball" and that the "Retooled ball physics and myriad new animations are the main differentiator from MLB 16, with outfielders taking more varied angles to cut off line drive doubles, and more realistic spin effects." Some of Wilson's criticisms involve that any of the game's modes "requires significant time commitment, even with speedier options" and that "Last year's online woes remain its Achilles heel".

Caley Roark gave the game a positive review for IGN. He scored it a 9.5/10, praised the overall presentation and gameplay, and stated: "Overall, MLB The Show 17 builds on last year's version, which many cited as the best in the series, by adding some key features and improvements. Most notable are increased hit variety, MLB Network integration, and the RTTS documentary. All of these additions make the game feel more like real baseball. This authenticity makes games more fun to play, as it's easier than ever to become invested in every pitch."

Polygon's Owen S. Good awarded the game an 8 out of 10, concluding: "MLB The Show 17 continues one of the longest-running successes in sports video gaming, and it's not a regression. But its advances sound a lot bigger on paper than they are in practice." Good praised the gameplay calling it "wonderfully varied" with pitching mechanics that "just feels stronger". One negative aspect of his review involves repetition in its presentation, saying its "MLB The Show's biggest weakness".

The game won the award for "Best Player Career Mode" at Game Informer's 2017 Sports Game of the Year Awards, and was nominated for "Sports Game of the Year" at the 21st Annual D.I.C.E. Awards, and for "Game, Franchise Sports" at the 17th Annual National Academy of Video Game Trade Reviewers Awards.
