= MLB The Show 22 =

2022 video game

- Cover art featuring Shohei Ohtani
- Developer: San Diego Studio
- Publishers: Sony Interactive Entertainment (Note: Distributor for non-PlayStation versions); MLB Advanced Media (Note: Non-PlayStation versions)
- Series: MLB: The Show
- Platforms: Nintendo Switch; PlayStation 4; PlayStation 5; Xbox One; Xbox Series X/S
- Release: April 5, 2022
- Genre: Sports
- Modes: Single-player, multiplayer

MLB The Show 22 is a 2022 baseball video game developed by San Diego Studio and published by Sony Interactive Entertainment. The seventeenth installment in the MLB: The Show series, it was released for the PlayStation 4, PlayStation 5, Xbox One and Xbox Series X/S, as well as Nintendo Switch, a first for the franchise. Los Angeles Angels two-way (pitcher and batter) player and 2021 American League MVP, Shohei Ohtani is featured as the cover star. A special manga-style art by Takashi Okazaki of Shohei Ohtani is featured on the cover art for the MVP and Digital Deluxe editions of MLB The Show 22.

For the second consecutive year, the Xbox versions of the game are available for Xbox Game Pass subscribers at no additional cost. People who purchased the MVP or Digital Deluxe editions received early access to the game starting April 1.

It marked one of the first MLB The Show games without any competitors in the United States, either simulation or arcade, as the R.B.I. Baseball series ended due to the Switch getting a port, although in Japan, the sole competitor is the latest entry in Konami's Power Pros series, eBaseball Powerful Pro Yakyuu 2022.

== Updates ==
- The Stadium Creator received updates to be dynamic, though it is not on the 8th generation systems (PS4, Xbox One, Nintendo Switch)
- MLB on ESPN Radio announcers Jon Sciambi and Chris Singleton are the new play-by-play commentators, with Alex Miniak remaining the public address announcer.
- The March to October game mode was expanded to last multiple seasons instead of one-and-done.

== Reception ==
Reception

Aggregate score
Aggregator	Score
Metacritic	PS5: 77/100; XSXS: 80/100; NS: 81/100

Review scores
Publication	Score
Game Informer	8.5/10
GameSpot	7/10
GamesRadar+	4/5
Hardcore Gamer	4/5
HobbyConsolas	80/100
IGN	7/10
Jeuxvideo.com	16/20
Nintendo Life	6/10
Nintendo World Report	9/10
Push Square	6/10
Shacknews	7/10
The Games Machine (Italy)	8/10

MLB The Show 22 received "generally favorable" reviews from critics, according to Metacritic.

GameSpot gave the game 7/10, praising the gameplay and expansion to various game modes but criticized the lack of innovation elsewhere and repetitive commentary. In its 4/5 review, GamesRadar+ similarly complimented the addition to the March to October mode but lamented the limited additions otherwise, saying: "Gripes aside, MLB The Show 22 remains a fun, authentic and comprehensive simulation, among the industry's best. Ignoring the surrounding marketplace pressure to reiterate and innovate, Sony's series sits alongside NBA 2K as the premier pro sports offering." In its 7/10 review, IGN wrote, "MLB The Show 22 is mostly a retread of an already great game, but more bugs than usual and the not quite ready for primetime co-op mode are signs this series may be losing some velocity." Game Informer noted that while MLB The Show 22's core gameplay was solid, it was becoming stale. The site also criticized the game's technical issues, writing, "A week after launch, MLB The Show 22's online performance is shaky...Online stability continues to be a huge hole...While the new Switch iteration offers all the content of the PlayStation and Xbox versions, it suffers from framerate stuttering and significant graphical flickering." Push Square and Shacknews praised the gameplay, seasons, co-op, and streamlined format while panning the unimproved visuals, aging game modes, and repetitive commentary. Several review outlets noted that while the Switch version suffered from major technical issues such as framerate stutters and scaled-back visuals, it was still playable and fun.

During the 26th Annual D.I.C.E. Awards, the Academy of Interactive Arts & Sciences nominated MLB The Show 22 for "Sports Game of the Year".
