= MLB The Show 25 =

2025 video game

- Cover art featuring Pittsburgh Pirates' Paul Skenes, Cincinnati Reds' Elly De La Cruz, and Baltimore Orioles' Gunnar Henderson
- Developer: San Diego Studio
- Publishers: Sony Interactive Entertainment (Note: Distributor for non-PlayStation versions); MLB Advanced Media (Note: Non-PlayStation versions)
- Series: MLB: The Show
- Platforms: Nintendo Switch; PlayStation 5; Xbox Series X/S
- Release: March 18, 2025
- Genre: Sports
- Modes: Single-player, multiplayer

MLB The Show 25 is a 2025 baseball video game developed by San Diego Studio and published by Sony Interactive Entertainment that was released on March 18, 2025. The twentieth installment in the MLB: The Show series, the game released for Nintendo Switch, PlayStation 5 and Xbox Series X/S. This is the first time the previous generations of consoles are excluded in the modern era. It features Paul Skenes, Elly De La Cruz, and Gunnar Henderson on its cover.

== Gameplay ==
The Road to the Show progression was significantly changed in MLB The Show 25. In addition to beginning at high school, the game features eight real college baseball teams the player character can play for leading up to the MLB draft. The featured teams are Cal State Fullerton, LSU, South Carolina, TCU, Tennessee, Texas, UCLA, and Vanderbilt.

Jon Sciambi and Chris Singleton returned as play-by-play commentators for the game. Ben Gellman returns as Minor League play-by-play announcer in Road to the Show. For the first time in MLB The Show history, Renel Brooks-Moon and Adrienne Roberson join Alex Miniak as public address commentators. Robert Flores and Jessica Mendoza serve as commentators in Road to the Show mode.

=== Diamond Dynasty ===
Diamond Dynasty, the game's card-collection mode, returned with a continuously expanding pool of player cards covering current Major League Baseball rosters, retired legends, and signature releases. MLB The Show 25's Diamond Dynasty mode features over 3,600 player cards across all 30 MLB rosters, including more than 1,400 Diamond-tier cards, with weekly roster updates adding new cards through the regular season. The mode's content is structured around recurring seasonal cycles that introduce new programs, themed card releases, and limited-time events throughout the year.

== Reception ==
MLB The Show 25 received "generally favorable" reviews from critics, according to the review aggregation website Metacritic. Fellow review aggregator OpenCritic assessed that the game received strong approval, being recommended by 91% of critics. In Japan, four critics from Famitsu gave the game a total score of 30 out of 40.

The Academy of Interactive Arts & Sciences nominated MLB The Show 25 for "Sports Game of the Year" at the 29th Annual D.I.C.E. Awards.

MLB The Show 25 was praised for its meaningful updates, specifically the revitalized "Road to the Show" mode. While the "Storylines" feature was noted as having unmet potential, the seasonal changes in "Diamond Dynasty" were highlighted as a successful improvement over previous entries.

== Development ==
San Diego Studio announced MLB The Show 25 on January 28, 2025, alongside the reveal of its three cover athletes: Paul Skenes, Elly De La Cruz, and Gunnar Henderson. The studio highlighted expanded presentation features, updated stadium lighting, and improvements to character animations across all platforms.
