= MLB 09: The Show =

2009 video game

- PS3 cover art featuring Dustin Pedroia
- Developer: San Diego Studio
- Publisher: Sony Computer Entertainment
- Series: MLB: The Show
- Platforms: PlayStation 2, PlayStation 3, PlayStation Portable
- Release: NA: March 3, 2009
- Genre: Sports (baseball)
- Modes: Single-player, multiplayer

MLB 09: The Show is a 2009 baseball video game developed by San Diego Studio and published by Sony Computer Entertainment for the PlayStation 2, PlayStation Portable and PlayStation 3. It is the fourth installment of the MLB: The Show series, as well as the last to use THX technology. 2008 American League MVP Dustin Pedroia is the cover athlete.

== Gameplay ==
MLB 09: The Show adds features to its predecessor The franchise and career modes have been altered with Road to the Show 3.0, which updated the mode with a steal and lead-off system, as well as more interaction with the player's coaches. Franchise 2.0 added several features to its career mode which include salary arbitration, waiver transactions, September call-ups, and the 40-man roster.

Also receiving an update is the game's online league play, allowing players to play out-of-order games and create their own custom rosters, and upload them online for other players to use. Players may also create custom chants.

Among the in-game alterations, there are more dynamic animations and reactions, improved bare-handed flips, in addition to "Progressive Batting Performance", in which player abilities improve or regress depending on how they play. With "Multi-Branch Fielding", players can now take full control of fielders and break out of any animation in the process, while "Adaptive Pitching Intelligence" (API) allows catchers to call the game based on the individual strengths and weaknesses of each pitcher and analyze tendencies of batters. The "Pitch Command System" (PCS) affects a pitcher's ability to throw a specific pitch change depending on how often the pitcher throws it.

The game also features pitch analysis, a breakdown of all the pitches thrown during the current game being played. This feature is also available for batters, and the batter analysis allowed for a breakdown of how a batter has performed. SportsConnect Online User Tracking (SCOUT) allows players to set their game preferences, store them on the server, and then allow the system to look for a Quick Match with an opponent that fits their criteria.

The game also features live MLB updates in-game, as well as SportsConnect Headline News. In addition, SportsConnect provides weekly roster updates that can be downloaded onto the console.

== Reception ==
Reception

Aggregate score
Aggregator	Score		
Aggregator	PS2	PS3	PSP
Metacritic	79/100	90/100	78/100

Review scores
Publication	Score		
Publication	PS2	PS3	PSP
1Up.com	N/A	A	N/A
Destructoid	N/A	9/10	N/A
Game Informer	N/A	9/10	N/A
GamePro	N/A	N/A	5/5
GameSpot	N/A	9/10	N/A
GameSpy	N/A	4/5	N/A
GameTrailers	N/A	8.8/10	N/A
GameZone	8.7/10	8.7/10	7/10
IGN	7.3/10	8.7/10	7.5/10
PlayStation Official Magazine – UK	N/A	10/10	7/10
411Mania	N/A	9.2/10	N/A

The PlayStation 3 version of MLB 09 The Show received "universal acclaim", while the PlayStation 2 and PSP versions received "generally favorable reviews", according to Metacritic.

During the 13th Annual Interactive Achievement Awards, the Academy of Interactive Arts & Sciences nominated MLB 09: The Show for "Sports Game of the Year".

== See also ==
- Major League Baseball 2K9
- MLB 08: The Show
- MLB 10: The Show
