= MLB The Show 19 =

2019 video game

- North American cover art featuring Bryce Harper
- Developer: San Diego Studio
- Publisher: Sony Interactive Entertainment
- Series: MLB: The Show
- Platform: PlayStation 4
- Release: March 26, 2019
- Genre: Sports
- Modes: Single-player, multiplayer

MLB The Show 19 is a 2019 baseball video game developed by San Diego Studio and published by Sony Interactive Entertainment for the PlayStation 4. It is the fourteenth installment in the MLB: The Show series. Philadelphia Phillies outfielder Bryce Harper is featured as the cover star.

Matt Vasgersian, Mark DeRosa and Dan Plesac call the play-by-plays. Heidi Watney joined the game as a sideline reporter and Alex Miniak replaces Mike Carlucci as the public address announcer.

Diamond Dynasty, Road to the Show and Franchise game modes return whilst Moments and March to October make their series debuts.

== Features ==
"March to October" makes its debut in this game. "Moments" lets the user relive and recreate famous moments in MLB history. This mode will be intertwined with the MLB The Show's "Diamond Dynasty", but also can be played strictly offline. As the user complete moments, they receive rewards like diamond dynasty cards and stubs, the game's virtual currency.

The game also features an improved emphasis on defense, with updated mechanics and animations. Pitchers are broken down into three categories: "Plain Filthy" (who move the ball well), "Flamethrower" (who throw the heat) and "Control Freak" (who focus on location), while batters are broken down into five: "Pure Power" (power hitters), "Small Ball" (puts the ball in play), "Mr. Utility" (great situational player), "Rock Steady" (solid all around) and "The Anomaly" (Power hitters with great speed).

Whilst legends have been an existing feature, this years edition introduced a further thirty names to the list, taking the total to 58 legends appearing in MLB The Show 19. Christy Mathewson, Ty Cobb, Jason Kendall, Rob Dibble, Willie Mays, Jimmie Foxx, Iván Rodríguez, Cliff Lee, Andruw Jones, Walter Johnson, Kerry Wood, Cy Young, Mark Prior, Rogers Hornsby, Lou Gehrig, Hal Newhouser, Bret Boone, Don Mattingly, A. J. Burnett and Rickey Henderson all feature as legends for the first time. The legends are playable both online, in modes such as Diamond Dynasty, as well as offline, appearing as free agents in franchise mode.

=== Commentary ===
The gameplay announcers are Matt Vasgersian, Mark DeRosa and Dan Plesac, whilst former Boston Red Sox field reporter Heidi Watney this year joins The Show series as a sideline reporter. Alex Miniak also replaces Mike Carlucci as the public address announcer and Erik Braa is the narrator of the Road To The Show game mode.

=== Franchise Mode ===
Returning favorites include "Franchise Mode" (in which the user can take control of any MLB team over the course of several seasons) and "Road to the Show" (in which the user creates a new player and plays out his career through Double-A, Triple-A and the majors).

=== Moments Mode ===
Moments Mode made its debut in the video game series in MLB The Show 19. This mode brings iconic baseball moments to the platform, allowing players to take part in recreating historic moments. The moments included in the game mode vary from as recent as plays by cover athlete Bryce Harper and the 2016 Chicago Cubs, to Babe Ruth and Willie Mays, requiring the user to recreate a sequence of match-winning plays pictured in black and white.

Moments
Legends	Moment	Reward	
Ken Griffey Jr.	Reenact the career of legendary power hitter Ken Griffey Jr. This moment requires the player to hit back to back home runs playing as both Ken Griffey Jr. and Sr. in 1990, as well as lead the Seattle Mariners to their first West Division Title in 1995.	84050 XP	11500 Stubs
Willie Mays	Willie Mays’ lengthier moments require players to recreate key points of the center fielders 1954 MVP season as well as lead the New York Giants to the 1954 World Series Title. Single play moments include recording Mays’ 600th home run and 3000th hit.	14000 XP	1000 Stubs
Bryce Harper	Recreating the key moments of MLB The Show 19 cover athlete Bryce Harper’s rookie season in 2012. Moments include hitting Harper’s first major league home run, playing in the right fielders debut MLB All-Star Game, as well as leading the Washington Nationals to the playoffs.	10950 XP	1100 Stubs
Babe Ruth	Recreating the career of widely regarded greatest baseball player of all time Babe Ruth is completed through reenacting nine key moments of the pitchers career. Moments include pitching for the Boston Red Sox during the world series and breaking batting records.	9400 XP	1325 Stubs
2016 Chicago Cubs	Recreate the key points of the 2016 Chicago Cubs World Series winning season, ending the longest championship drought in MLB history, 108 years.	20000 XP	2100 Stubs

=== Diamond Dynasty ===
Once again featuring in the series, Diamond Dynasty is the online mode which allows players to construct their own team through earning and spending ‘stubs’, the online currency. The focus for MLB The Show 19's Diamond Dynasty mode is to promote the accessibility of player cards, earned through playing games, pack openings, purchased on the virtual market as well as earned through reward programs. New features to the game mode include; Team Affinity, rewarding players for using players from their favourite MLB team, Signature Series, a new set of rare player cards to unlock and Ranked Season's.

=== March to October ===
March to October is a new game mode to The Show's series on MLB The Show 19. The feature differs from the traditional franchise game mode through creating a streamlined, shortened season experience. Rather than controlling the entire 162 game schedule, the season is condensed to require the player to only play the season's pivotal moments.

=== Road to the Show ===
Road to the Show returns to the series in MLB The Show 19. This game mode allows players to create and control an individual pro for a multi season career. Players also have the option to prioritise personality types for their character, these are:

- Commander in Chief (team captain).
- Maverick (lone-wolf type).
- Lighting Rod (no-nonsense result getter).
- Heart and Soul (tight social circle).

== Release ==
San Diego Studio announced on the second of November 2018 the official release date for MLB The Show 2019 as well as the details regarding special editions. The 2019 edition of the series ‘The Show’ was released on March 26, 2019. San Diego Studio released a closed alpha early access to the video game between 13–19 December. The closed alpha provided fans early access to participate in game modes such as the Diamond Dynasty, Battle Royale and Play with Friends features.

Since its creation, The Show series had been a PlayStation exclusive franchise. However, on December 10, 2019, it was announced as part of Sony’s renewed deal with the MLB and MLBPA that the video game series will be available to play on Xbox, Nintendo and PC from 2021. MLB The Show will be only major baseball franchise available on Xbox, Nintendo and PC platforms.

=== Cover ===
On November 2, 2018, it was announced that Bryce Harper would be featured on the cover for the 2019 edition of the game. However, since he was a free agent at the time, he was depicted on the placeholder image in a white hoodie. On February 28, 2019, after Harper signed with the Philadelphia Phillies, the official cover design was released.

== Competitive ==
Sony, in conjunction with the ESL (Electronic Sports League), hosted two competitive competitions.

In February 2020, 106 professional gamers competed in a competition called the New Year’s Cup Finals. The event was labelled by professional gamer GomesDaLegend as a “disaster”. This was due to the ESL reseeding, the restructuring of the competition tree, once the event had already began, rendering the commenced competition as null and void. In response to the discontent amongst players, Sony announced a new competition would be scheduled, taking place between February 29 and March 1, 2020. Rewards for the tournament were as follows: $4000 for first place, $2000 for second place, $1000 to both third and forth, and $500 for fifth to eighth.

Commencing November the 17th 2019, the ESL hosted the Fall Cup Final. The competition involved 128 players competing in a 1 on 1 format on Diamond Dynasty. The winner of the tournament was rewarded with a $4,000 reward, second place received $2,000, third and fourth both received $1,000 whilst fifth to eight won $500. The final, occurring on the 16th of November 2019, was won by gamer Otoxii.

== Reception ==
Reception

Aggregate score
Aggregator	Score
Metacritic	86/100

Review scores
Publication	Score
Game Informer	8.5/10
GameSpot	9/10
IGN	8.7/10

Whilst previous editions to the MLB The Show series have been critiqued in reviews through failing to provide a considerate update to the video game as well as focusing on microtransactions, these issues have been addressed by the developers at San Diego Studio. MLB The Show 19 has reduced the focus on microtransactions, referring to the need to spend real money in exchange for stubs, in order to benefit in game modes such as Diamond Dynasty. Reviews have highlighted the ability to progress within the Diamond Dynasty game mode without the need of microtransactions.

MLB The Show 19 received "generally favorable" reviews from critics, according to Metacritic.

In its 8.7/10 review, IGN wrote: "Refined gameplay, new modes, and a deep Road to the Show mode give MLB The Show 19 a promising opening day." Game Informer gave the game 8.5/10, praising its graphics and writing, "After a down year, Sony delivers exciting new content and a host of fixes. The series is back on track." GameSpot gave the game 9/10, praising the fielding mechanics, RPG elements of the Road to the Show mode and reward system of the game's card collecting mode.

=== Sales ===
In January 2020, The NPD Group confirmed that MLB The Show 19 is the best selling baseball genre game in U.S. history.

=== Awards ===
Year	Award	Category	Result	Ref
2020	23rd Annual D.I.C.E. Awards	Sports Game of the Year	Nominated	
2020	NAVGTR Awards	Game, Franchise Sports	Nominated	
