= MLB 07: The Show =

2007 video game

- Cover art featuring David Wright
- Developer: San Diego Studio
- Publisher: Sony Computer Entertainment
- Series: MLB: The Show
- Platforms: PlayStation 2, PlayStation Portable, PlayStation 3
- Release: PlayStation 2, PlayStation Portable: NA: February 27, 2007; PlayStation 3: NA: May 15, 2007
- Genre: Sports (baseball)
- Modes: Single-player, multiplayer

MLB 07: The Show is a 2007 baseball video game developed by San Diego Studio and published by Sony Computer Entertainment for the PlayStation 2 and PlayStation Portable. A PlayStation 3 version was released the same year. It is the only first-party MLB-licensed video game for the 2007 season, and the only baseball game released for the PlayStation systems that year, aside from Major League Baseball 2K7.

All-Star third baseman David Wright, who played for the 2007 New York Mets, is featured on the cover. The three-man team of announcers once again include Rex Hudler, Matt Vasgersian and Dave Campbell.

== Gameplay ==
MLB 07: The Show makes the transition to next-gen with a suite of advanced features in its race to become MVP of 2007's baseball crop. The all-new Road to The Show mode enables gamers to play both offense and defense from the created player's perspective. Providing an even more realistic experience from the mound, the all-new New Pitch Command System (PCS) delivers comprehensive strategy to pitch selection, as a pitcher's "pitch comfort" will be predetermined based on a best to worst pitch scenario. It is up the gamer to decide if he/she should try to "work on a pitch" or just go with what is working. Additionally, with the Adaptive Pitching Intelligence (API) feature, catchers will call the game based on the individual strengths and weaknesses of each pitcher as well as analyze tendencies of batters. Gamers will now have the ability to either trust the pitches called by the catcher or shake them off. MLB 07: The Show also delivers a robust online feature set, including Online League Play, which offers the ability to set up customizable leagues with up to 30 teams, complete with full stat tracking, point benefits and rewards.

== Reception ==
Reception

Aggregate score
Aggregator	Score		
Aggregator	PS2	PS3	PSP
Metacritic	83/100	77/100	82/100

Review scores
Publication	Score		
Publication	PS2	PS3	PSP
Game Informer	8.75/10	7.5/10	N/A
GamePro	4/5	N/A	N/A
GameRevolution	N/A	C+	N/A
GameSpot	8.5/10	8.2/10	8/10
GameSpy	4/5	4/5	4/5
GameTrailers	6.9/10	N/A	N/A
GameZone	8.1/10	8.4/10	N/A
IGN	8.5/10	7.7/10	7.9/10
PlayStation Official Magazine – UK	N/A	8/10	N/A
PlayStation: The Official Magazine	7.5/10	8/10	7.5/10
Detroit Free Press	3/4	N/A	N/A
USA Today	N/A	6/10	N/A

The game received "generally favorable reviews" on all platforms according to the review aggregation website Metacritic.

One aspect that has been mentioned by reviewers are the number of bugs or glitches in the game. Examples of this are scoring runs after being caught out and high fly balls not functioning correctly. The game suffered in its reviews due to this with critics praising the gameplay but lamenting the sheer number of bugs that should have been solved before release.

Maxim gave the PlayStation 2 version a score of eight out of ten, saying, "It's become fashionable for billionaire ballplayers to discuss their feelings [...] which is no doubt why The Show's developers decided to focus on your pitcher's feelings this year." The same magazine also gave the PlayStation 3 a score of eight out of ten, saying, "The PS3's graphics are certainly crisp, and the inclusion of SIXAXIS control for fielding... is very cool; but overall, the game feels less like a fully realized next-gen baseball game and more like a blueprint for next year's installment. For now, we'll trade this game for two minor league pitchers, a half gallon of Gatorade, and a case of fungo bats." Detroit Free Press gave the PS2 version three stars out of four, saying, "If John Smoltz is getting a lot of strikes with his slider, the confidence meter will increase, making it even nastier for opposing batters. If his curveball is getting pounded out of the park, throwing another one will be a risky venture. A new Road to the Show career mode allows players to create a rookie who must toil in the minors while awaiting a chance to crack the big league lineup." 411Mania gave the PS2 and PSP versions a similar score of 7.5 out of 10, saying, "There is plenty here for baseball fans and newbies to do. With all the various modes, online play, and customizable content, it is definitely a fan friendly title." However, USA Today gave the PS3 version six stars out of ten, saying that "As a baseball title, [the game] is a solid and has a wide array of choices. As a PS3 title, The Show whiffs badly. You're better off saving that $20 and purchasing the equally satisfying PlayStation 2 edition."

During the 11th Annual Interactive Achievement Awards, MLB 07: The Show received a nomination for "Sports Game of the Year" by the Academy of Interactive Arts & Sciences.
