= MLB The Show 16 =

2016 video game

- United States cover art featuring Josh Donaldson
- Developer: San Diego Studio
- Publisher: Sony Computer Entertainment
- Series: MLB: The Show
- Platforms: PlayStation 3 PlayStation 4
- Release: March 29, 2016
- Genre: Sports
- Modes: Single-player, multiplayer

MLB The Show 16 is a 2016 baseball video game developed by San Diego Studio and published by Sony Computer Entertainment for the PlayStation 3 and PlayStation 4. It is the eleventh installment in the MLB: The Show series. It is the first entry in the series to not have a portable version (due to waning first-party support for the PlayStation Vita), and is the final entry to be released on the PlayStation 3. Toronto Blue Jays third baseman and 2015 American League MVP winner Josh Donaldson is featured on the main cover of the game. He also appears on the separate Canadian cover edition, making him the first player to be on both the American and Canadian versions of the game. Jung-ho Kang of the Pittsburgh Pirates and Wei-Yin Chen of the Miami Marlins appear on the Korean and Taiwanese covers, respectively. The servers for the game shut down on July 28, 2020

== New features ==
The game features more game modes than the previous iteration, MLB 15: The Show, such as Road To The Show and an all-new franchise mode. In addition, Conquest Mode and Battle Royale have been added to Diamond Dynasty.

=== Conquest Mode ===
Conquest Mode pits the user's Diamond Dynasty team against all 30 MLB teams and their strongholds to capture new territories and eventually all of North America. Each territory is inhabited by fans of the user's team or one of the 30 MLB teams. In order to capture one of the territories, the user must attack the territory by either playing a minimum three-inning game against that team or simulating to avoid playing the game. However, all 30 MLB teams are also trying to capture territories and strongholds, which means the user's team will have to defend its territories and strongholds.

=== Battle Royale ===
Battle Royale is a competitive player-vs-player mode. The user has 25 rounds to draft their best team to go up against opponents to reach the 20-win mark in a double-elimination format, with smaller bonuses awarded for 19-win campaigns. Playing Battle Royale the first time is free, but any other entries cost an additional 1,500 stubs.

=== ShowTime ===
ShowTime is a feature that allows the user to slow down time while batting in clutch situations or making game saving defensive plays.

=== Camera views ===
A new batting camera called "Fish Eye" is now the default batting camera. It is much wider than last year's version of the batting view as it allows the user to see where all the infielders are lined up. It also allows the user to see where the ball goes in the event the catcher misses the ball.

== Reception ==
Reception

Aggregate score
Aggregator	Score
Metacritic	85/100

Review scores
Publication	Score
Destructoid	7.5/10
Game Informer	8/10
GameRevolution	7/10
GameSpot	8/10
GamesRadar+	4.5/5
Hardcore Gamer	4/5
IGN	9.3/10
Polygon	8/10
Shacknews	8/10
USgamer	4/5

MLB The Show 16 received generally positive reviews, according to review aggregator Metacritic.

Destructoid gave the game 7.5 out of 10, taking issue with the lack of collision physics, Quick Count system, technical issues, commentary, and mediocre soundtrack, while lauding the core gameplay, writing, "If MLB The Show‘s new MO is just coasting on the good gameplay and providing minor tweaks to disparate modes...then there's no greater candidate for games-as-service that I can see...the baseball itself is as good as ever, and one of the better modes, Road to the Show, is far less clunky this time around." IGN called it "the best baseball game available on any current-gen console", commending the animations, graphics, various modes, load times, and depth via consumable perks and the morale system. Game Informer praised the title's departure from being an authentic simulation, addition of new modes, and the core gameplay while likening the new gameplay experience to that of a superhero game. USgamer gave the title a 4 out of 5, concluding, "If you're a curious newcomer who likes baseball, you will find an extremely strong baseball sim; but if you're a returning player, your mileage will probably vary depending on how willing you are to indulge in The Show's card-collecting mode." Polygon praised its iteration upon its predecessor, writing, "MLB The Show 16's additions and changes may not be breakthroughs, but they refine weaker areas of the game that had been routine or even chorelike."

GameRevolution reviewed the game less positively, praising its in-depth feature modes, lighting engine, and representation of MLB careers, and expressed frustration with its new focus on RPG elements and the dated graphics while still noting, "MLB The Show 16 is a solid sim that plays well and looks better than ever." GameSpot heavily praised the Conquest and Diamond Dynasty modes, visuals, lighting, stadium detail, options, and incremental improvements, but cited the presence of perks and microtransactions as negatives. GamesRadar+ thought highly of the presentation, accessibility, pitching engine, and roster updates, while the scouting system and bloat of content were seen as minor negatives. Shacknews liked the core gameplay, accessibility, visuals, presentation, quality of life improvements, amount of content, and perks, but disliked the microtransactions, lag, and finicky controls.

During the 20th Annual D.I.C.E. Awards, the Academy of Interactive Arts & Sciences nominated MLB The Show 16 for "Sports Game of the Year".
