= MLB 08: The Show =

2008 video game

- Cover art featuring Ryan Howard
- Developer: San Diego Studio
- Publisher: Sony Computer Entertainment
- Series: MLB: The Show
- Platforms: PlayStation 2, PlayStation 3, PlayStation Portable
- Release: NA: March 4, 2008
- Genre: Sports (baseball)
- Modes: Single-player, multiplayer

MLB 08: The Show is a 2008 baseball video game developed by San Diego Studio published by Sony Computer Entertainment for the PlayStation 2, PlayStation 3 and PlayStation Portable. It is the third installment in the MLB: The Show series. Ryan Howard, all-star first baseman for the Philadelphia Phillies, is featured as the game's cover athlete.

The game is a baseball simulation in which, depending on the gameplay mode, the player controls one or all of the players on a Major League Baseball team or some select Minor League Baseball teams. Depending on the gameplay mode, the player may control a team for a single game, season, or franchise, and can also create a player and control his career.

== Gameplay ==
Pitcher-Batter analysis mode, in which the player is able to access information in game about the current hitter and pitcher.

Gameplay is similar to the other versions of MLB: The Show, as well as most baseball simulation video games. Some new features were introduced in various gameplay modes. The player may take control of one of 30 Major League Baseball teams in any game mode (excluding Road to the Show) and use that team in gameplay. The game has variable game modes in which a player takes control of a team for a single game, one season, or a franchise (multiple seasons). The player may control the team's batting, pitching, and fielding while playing the game. Many new general features have been introduced to the game as improvements to the previous edition, MLB 07: The Show. One of the major updates to the game is the "Batter/Pitcher Analysis" feature. This feature allows players to check the "match up" between the current batter and pitcher. Information such as strike/ball ratio, pitch types, pitch frequency, pitch location and the last 25 pitches thrown by the current pitcher. For pitchers, stats such as batters "hot zones", balls taken, strikeout pitch location, and stats when facing that particular pitcher.

Another main update to the game is the "Progressive Batting Performance". This feature tracks the batting stats of all players in season and franchise modes, and for your created player in Road to the Show mode. Progressive Batting Performance tracks trends in the player's batting statistics, and then gives a rating compared to the average performance of that player each month. If the player is doing better, the player will perform stats will increase, while if the player's stats are getting worse, they will fall into a "hitting slump", a prolonged period of time in which the player has trouble batting.

Fielding was also improved from previous versions, with better AI making fewer mistakes in the field, AI calculations on whether the runner will reach base before a throw gets there, and improved fielding mechanics. A "Rob Home Run Indicator" was also added. This feature indicated if a ball traveling over the wall was close enough to jump and catch to save a home run. A marker of where to jump, as well as timing, was also added.

=== Game modes ===
MLB 08: The Show contains most game modes found in nearly every baseball simulation game, which include quick game (or exhibition), season, and franchise modes. In exhibition mode, players play a single game not related to a season or series of games, choosing from 30 major league teams, or one of 60 minor league teams, which include teams from the International League, Pacific Coast League, Texas League, Southern League, and Eastern League. This is a normal game where players can choose lineups, pitchers, game settings, and then either play against another player or the CPU. A variation of this mode is "quick game" mode, in which you choose teams, and default lineups, pitchers, and game settings are used.

Road to the Show mode, showing the player's goals to advance in their career.

One of the game's main gameplay modes is "Road to the Show" mode. In Road to the Show, the player creates a player to be part of an organization. The player controls only that player through their career, and attempts to make them better by earning skill points from achieving goals such as getting hits, stealing bases, or turning double plays. The career player begins playing in the minor leagues at AA class, and progresses through AAA class until they are called up to the Major Leagues. The player must accomplish goals that are given to them by their team manager, which in turn give then skill points if they are completed, and deduct skill points if they are failed or not attempted. There are also "advancement goals" that the player must accomplish over a certain period of time that will help the player's career player advance to higher levels of play. Advancement goals include developing abilities, getting higher stats, and getting on base more often.

Also included in the game are season and franchise modes. Franchise mode allows the player to take control of a Major League Baseball team (as well as its minor league teams) as the general manager. The player plays games, makes roster moves, signs free agents, manages the budget, and attempts to accomplish the goals set by the owner by the end of the contract. Unlike Road to the Show, these are organizational goals, such as winning two World Series championships or hosting the MLB All-Star Game. Season mode is the same as franchise mode, but there are no goals and the player only takes control of the team for a single season.

"Manager mode" and "Rivalry mode" are the two final gameplay modes featured in MLB 08: The Show. In Manager mode, the player acts as the team's manager, calling plays, making in-game roster changes, or adjusting your team to certain batters and pitchers. Rivalry mode is where two teams continuously play each other for a set number of games, such as 16 or 24, although it is possible to play as many as 83.

== Development ==
MLB 08: The Show was developed by Sony Computer Entertainment America's San Diego Studio development team, and is part of the MLB The Show series of video games. The predecessor to this game was MLB 07: The Show. San Diego Studio wanted to improve on the realism of MLB 07: The Show, and added new animations, realistic animations for specific players, and better gameplay physics to improve on MLB 07: The Show. In an interview, Scott Rohde, a member San Diego Studio, said "Baseball fans know that the MLB franchise has been met with critical acclaim and has a long-standing winning tradition. MLB 08: The Show continues to display our commitment to delivering highly-innovative and improved features in order to provide an unrivaled simulation with a broadcast quality presentation"

The game was run on the same game engine as the last two games in the series, so no updating was made to the game's actual physics, and no overhaul was made on the game's graphics system. While creating the game, the developers added many minor features to the graphics, however. Over 3,000 player animations were added to the game, which include player's personal batting stances, pitcher's wind up motions, animations for specific players (such as Nomar Garciaparra's ritual of adjusting his batting gloves), and normal game animations. Rex Hudler, Matt Vasgersian and Dave Campbell returned for the third straight season, acting as the in-game broadcasters. Mike Carlucci does the P.A. Announcing.

Also other famous stadiums and arenas are added in the background. At Jacobs Field in Cleveland, Quicken Loans Arena home of the Cleveland Cavaliers can be seen. At Safeco Field in Seattle, CenturyLink Field home of the Seattle Seahawks can be seen. At Comerica Park in Detroit, Ford Field home of the Detroit Lions can be seen. And at Shea Stadium in New York City, Citi Field can be seen under construction which is now the home of the New York Mets.

== Reception ==
Reception

Aggregate score
Aggregator	Score		
Aggregator	PS2	PS3	PSP
Metacritic	84/100	85/100	83/100

Review scores
Publication	Score		
Publication	PS2	PS3	PSP
1Up.com	N/A	B−	A−
Game Informer	N/A	8.5/10	N/A
GameRevolution	N/A	B	N/A
GameSpot	N/A	8.5/10	N/A
GameSpy	4/5 stars	4/5 stars	4/5 stars
GameTrailers	N/A	8.7/10	N/A
GameZone	8.4/10	8/10	8.5/10
IGN	8/10	8.7/10	8.2/10
PlayStation Official Magazine – UK	N/A	9/10	N/A
PlayStation: The Official Magazine	4/5 stars	4.5/5 stars	4/5 stars
Maxim	N/A	8/10	N/A
USA Today	N/A	7/10	N/A

The game received "favorable" reviews on all platforms according to the review aggregation website Metacritic.

Jeff Haynes of IGN said of the PS3 version, "Visually, MLB '08 is a gigantic leap forward over that of last year. Camera sweeps of the parks have a new television-styled presentation, making the game feel much more realistic...The on-field play is excellently done, the stat tracking is immense, and Road to the Show is one of the best career modes around. Visually striking, this is the baseball game that baseball fans have been waiting for on the PS3."

Game Informer's review stated that the same console version's realism and graphics were the best of any baseball sim, stating, "The visuals accompanying the tried-and-true play showcase a high level of realism; fans lunge for foul balls and knock a beach ball around, while star players have their signature swings. The most impressive aspect, however, is the fluid player movement. Fielders don't always make the correct decisions, but they move with the grace of Ozzie Smith and rarely make boneheaded decisions like they did last year. The game also transitions nicely between batting and fielding, which allows players to get a good read on the ball right off of the bat. The CPU AI shows some smarts while pitching, and the ratio of home run balls seems right on."

411Mania gave the PS3 version a score of 8.4 out of 10 and said it was "the best possible baseball game you can buy this year, and I highly recommend anyone who is looking for a good sports game to try out MLB 08." Maxim gave the same console version eight out of ten and said that it was "much more varied this year, i.e. there are far fewer of those hit-a-homer-or-fail objectives, and more small-ball, hit-and-run-type scenarios." However, USA Today gave the same console version seven out of ten, saying that it "isn't going to wow you with unique controls or powerful graphic[s]. But it provides a smooth, consistent baseball experience."

During the 12th Annual Interactive Achievement Awards, the Academy of Interactive Arts & Sciences nominated MLB 08: The Show for "Sports Game of the Year".

== Soundtrack ==
Artist	Song
A Tribe Called Quest	Award Tour
The Blood Arm	Suspicious Character
Franz Ferdinand	The Fallen (Remixed by Justice)
Hot Hot Heat	My Best Fiend
Kenna	Out of Control (State of Emotion) (XXXChange remix)
No More Kings	Sweep The Leg
Queens of the Stone Age	In the Fade
Ramones	Blitzkrieg Bop
Thin Lizzy	Jailbreak
War	Low Rider
ZZ Top	I'm Bad, I'm Nationwide

== See also ==
- Major League Baseball 2K8
- MLB 07: The Show
