= MLB The Show 18 =

2018 sports video game

- United States cover art featuring Aaron Judge
- Developer: San Diego Studio
- Publisher: Sony Interactive Entertainment
- Series: MLB: The Show
- Platform: PlayStation 4
- Release: March 27, 2018
- Genre: Sports
- Modes: Single-player, multiplayer

MLB The Show 18 is a baseball video game by San Diego Studio and published by Sony Interactive Entertainment, based on Major League Baseball (MLB). It is the thirteenth entry of the MLB: The Show franchise, and was released worldwide on March 27, 2018, for PlayStation 4. New York Yankees outfielder Aaron Judge is featured as the cover star for the U.S. version, while Toronto Blue Jays pitcher Marcus Stroman is on the cover of the Canadian version. A limited number of people were invited to a closed alpha, which began on December 22, 2017, until December 26, 2017, to test the online servers. Those who pre-ordered the game received access to the game four days early, able to pick up their copy of the game on March 23, 2018.

Matt Vasgersian, Dan Plesac and Mark DeRosa act as play-by-play commentators; DeRosa replaces Harold Reynolds, who was featured in the previous year's game. Mike Carlucci returns as public address commentator.

== Features ==
"MLB The Show 18" is host to a multitude of features; Play Now, Road to The Show, Franchise, Diamond Dynasty.

=== Road to The Show ===
The "Road to The Show" game mode allows the user to create a player and guide him through path to MLB. In this game mode the user plays the baseball games through their player, only able to control situations that involve their player (ex. "at-bats", "fielding opportunities").

== Reception ==
Reception

Aggregate score
Aggregator	Score
Metacritic	82/100

Review scores
Publication	Score
Electronic Gaming Monthly	9/10
Game Informer	6.75/10
GameSpot	9/10
IGN	8.5/10

MLB The Show 18 received "generally favorable" reviews from critics, according to review aggregator Metacritic.

Eddie Makuch of GameSpot gave the game 9/10, writing: "Sony's flagship baseball franchise has never been better. With its best-in-class controls and visuals, and impeccable attention to detail for the small stuff, MLB The Show 18 is worth catching for any baseball fan." Writing for IGN, Caley Roark gave it an 8.5/10 and said, "The strength of the MLB The Show series has always been its authentic gameplay, which traditionally does a fantastic job capturing the essence of baseball. The 2018 version of The Show continues that trend, creating the most realistic baseball game to date. However, the nuanced gameplay and visual changes don't quite make up for the lack of innovation – or removal – of MLB The Show's core modes."

Michael Goroff of Electronic Gaming Monthly gave the 8.5/10, writing, "MLB The Show 18 offers a ton of options for new players to craft their own experiences while still giving veteran players the level of depth they'd expect from the latest entry in a series that's been totally refined over the years."

Conversely, Andrew Reiner of Game Informer gave it just 6.75/10, specifically criticizing online gameplay and saying "... the online aspect of the game – where Sony is focusing the most for additions – remains unpredictable at best and completely broken at its worst. As the season goes along, the experience will hopefully get better, but for the hardcore baseball fans that purchased the game early, it can be a nightmare."

The Academy of Interactive Arts & Sciences nominated MLB The Show 18 for "Sports Game of the Year" at the 22nd Annual D.I.C.E. Awards.
