= MLB 14: The Show =

2014 video game

- United States cover art featuring Miguel Cabrera
- Developer: San Diego Studio
- Publisher: Sony Computer Entertainment
- Series: MLB: The Show
- Platforms: PlayStation 3; PlayStation Vita; PlayStation 4
- Release: PlayStation 3, Vita: NA: April 1, 2014; EU: April 2, 2014; PlayStation 4 May 6, 2014
- Genre: Sports
- Modes: Single-player, multiplayer

MLB 14: The Show is a 2014 baseball video game developed by San Diego Studio and published by Sony Computer Entertainment for the PlayStation 3 and PlayStation Vita. A PlayStation 4 version was released the same year. It is the ninth installment in the MLB: The Show series and the first to be released on the PlayStation 4. Detroit Tigers first baseman Miguel Cabrera is the featured athlete on the cover. As with the previous two entries, Canada has a unique cover, with Toronto Blue Jays third baseman Brett Lawrie on the cover.

Matt Vasgersian, Eric Karros, and Steve Lyons did the play-by-play action. Mike Carlucci returned as P.A. Announcer.

In March 2015, Sony announced the multiplayer support of the game would be shut down on June 18, 2015.

== Reception ==
Reception

Aggregate scores
Aggregator	Score
GameRankings	83% (PS4); 82% (PS3); 72% (VITA)
Metacritic	83/100 (PS4); 81/100 (PS3); 68/100 (VITA)

Review scores
Publication	Score
Game Informer	8.5/10
GameSpot	8/10
IGN	8.1/10
Hardcore Gamer	4/5

Matt Beaudette of Hardcore Gamer gave the game a 4/5, calling it "excellent", going onto say that "it seems quite apparent most of the work on this year’s game went into getting it up and running on the PS4 with shiny new graphics."

Ryan McCaffrey of IGN gave the game an 8.1/10, saying it was "yet again, a stellar baseball simulation that's packed with enough quality game modes to occupy and entertain me for the entire season, but there are few exciting new features, and online is currently a very laggy experience."

Jack DeVries of GameSpot gave the game an 8/10, and commented "The presentation in The Show remains stellar, offering lively, informative commentary that holds more humor than you might expect."

During the 18th Annual D.I.C.E. Awards, the Academy of Interactive Arts & Sciences nominated MLB 14: The Show for "Sports Game of the Year".

The PlayStation 4 version of the game became the fastest-selling entry in the series to date within the first week of the game's release on the platform.
