= Gunnar Henderson =

American baseball player (born 2001)

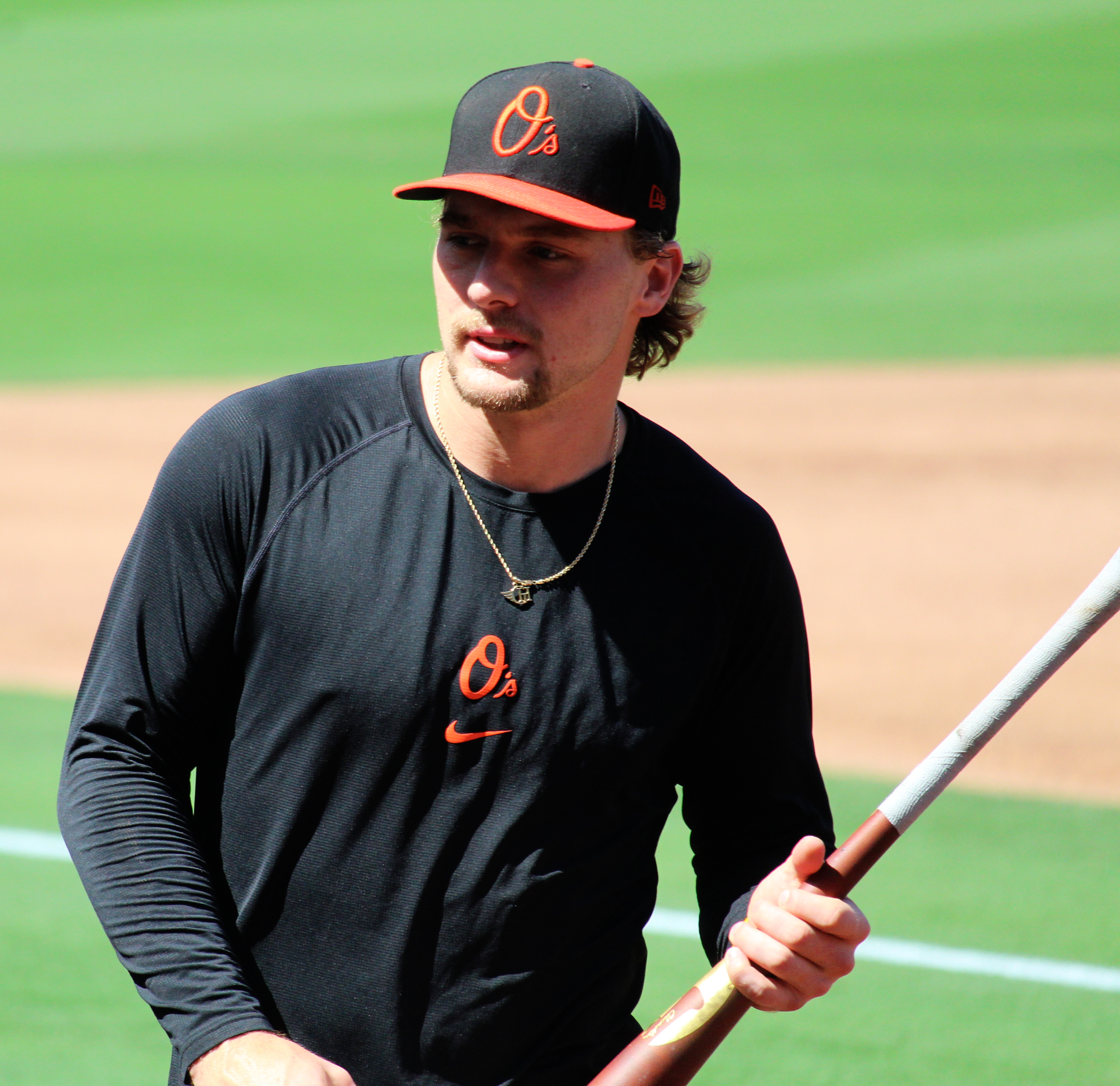
- Henderson with the Baltimore Orioles in 2025

Baltimore Orioles – No. 2
- Shortstop / Third baseman
- Born: June 29, 2001 (age 25); Montgomery, Alabama, U.S.
- Bats: Left Throws: Right

MLB debut
- August 31, 2022, for the Baltimore Orioles

MLB statistics (through 2026 season)
- Batting average: .259
- Home runs: 110
- Runs batted in: 320
- Stolen bases: 72
- Stats at Baseball Reference

Teams
- Baltimore Orioles (2022–present)

Career highlights and awards
- All-Star (2024); AL Rookie of the Year (2023); Silver Slugger Award (2023)
Medals
Men's baseball
Representing United States
World Baseball Classic
Silver medal – second place	2026 Miami	Team

Gunnar Randal Henderson (born June 29, 2001) is an American professional baseball shortstop and third baseman for the Baltimore Orioles of Major League Baseball (MLB). He made his MLB debut in 2023 and won the American League Rookie of the Year Award and a Silver Slugger Award that same year. He was named an All-Star in 2024.

== Early life and career ==
Henderson was born in Montgomery, Alabama, and grew up in Selma, Alabama, where he attended John T. Morgan Academy and played basketball and baseball. Henderson committed to play college baseball at Auburn University during his sophomore season. As a senior in 2019, he was named the Alabama Player of the Year after batting .559 with 17 doubles, nine triples, 11 home runs, 69 runs scored and 75 RBIs while stealing 32 bases. Henderson was also named the Alabama Independent School Association Player of the Year in basketball after averaging 17 points and 11 rebounds per game. Two years after his graduation in 2019, his uniform number 2 was retired by the Morgan Academy baseball program on January 8, 2021.

== Professional career ==
The Baltimore Orioles selected Henderson in the second round of the 2019 Major League Baseball draft with the 42nd overall pick. Henderson signed with the club for a $2.3 million signing bonus. After signing, he was assigned to the rookie-level Gulf Coast League Orioles. Henderson finished his first professional season with a .259 batting average, one home run, and 11 RBI.

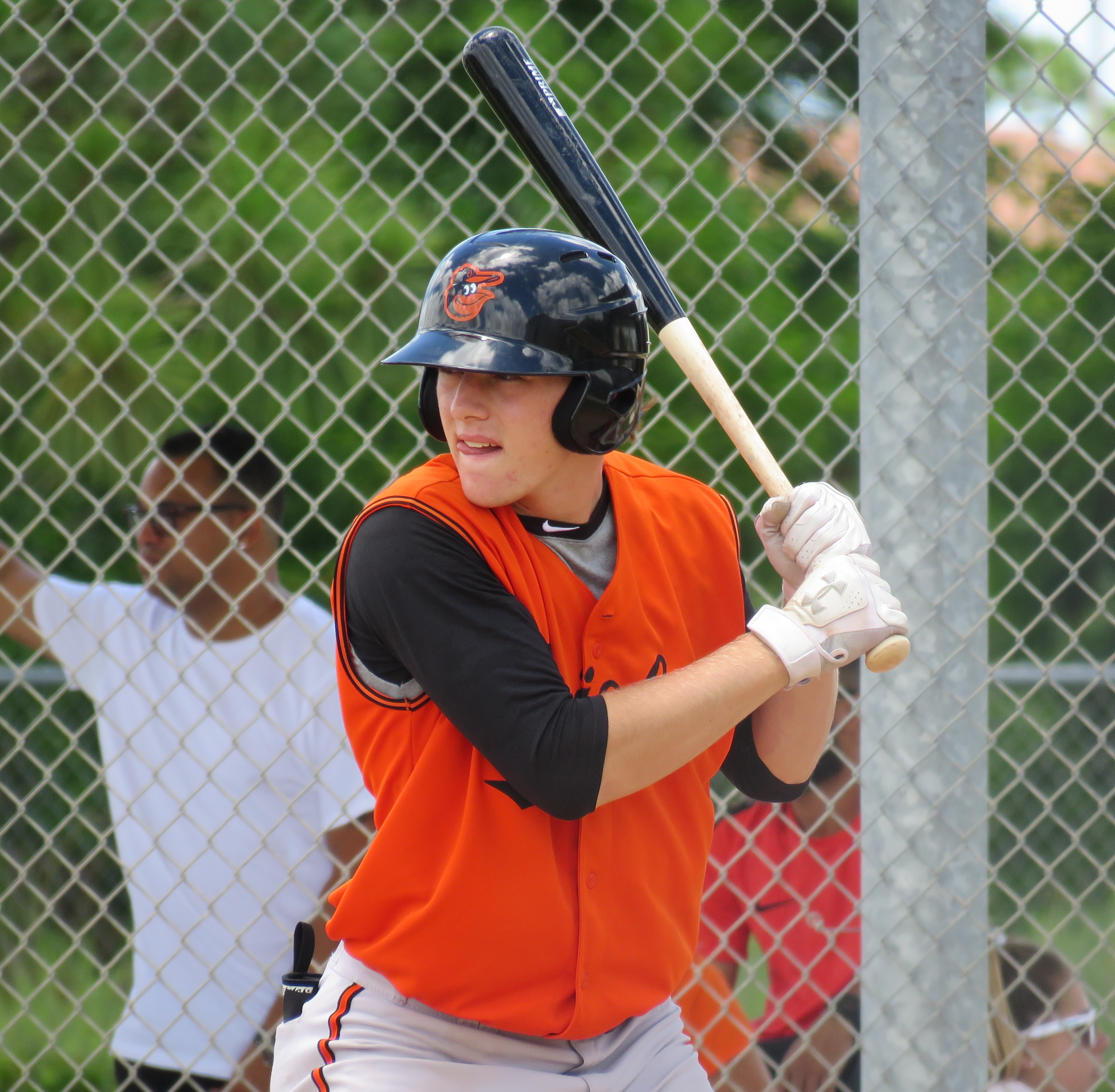
Henderson in 2019

After the 2020 minor league season was canceled due to the COVID-19 pandemic, Henderson was added to the Orioles' alternate training site midway through the Major League season and then took part in the team's fall Instructional League. Henderson was named the best overall athlete in the Orioles' minor league system going into the 2021 season. He began the season with the Low-A Delmarva Shorebirds and was promoted to the High-A Aberdeen IronBirds and the Double-A Bowie Baysox during the year. Over 105 games between the three teams, he slashed .258/.350/.476 with 17 home runs, 74 RBI, 28 doubles and 16 stolen bases.

Henderson began the 2022 season at Bowie. He entered the season as a consensus top-100 prospect across baseball. Henderson batted .312/.452/.573 in 157 at bats with eight home runs and 35 RBI with 41 runs scored in 47 games for the Baysox before being promoted to the Triple-A Norfolk Tides. On June 28, 2022, the day before his 21st birthday, he hit for the cycle in a 8–2 win over the Gwinnett Stripers. Henderson was selected to represent the Orioles at the 2022 All-Star Futures Game.

The Orioles selected Henderson's contract on August 31, 2022, and promoted him to the active roster. He made the starting roster later that day, in a game against the Cleveland Guardians. His first major league hit was a home run off of Triston McKenzie Henderson batted .259 with four home runs and 18 RBIs in 34 games with the Orioles in 2022. Following the season, Henderson was named the 2022 Baseball America Minor League Player of the Year. The honor came after Henderson hit .297 with 19 home runs, 76 RBI, and 22 stolen bases in 112 games split between Bowie and Norfolk.

=== 2023 ===
On June 11, 2023, Henderson hit a 462-foot home run against the Kansas City Royals, which was the farthest ever hit onto Eutaw Street in the 31-year history of Camden Yards. He had a pair of four-hit games in his rookie season, beginning with a 14–1 away win over the New York Yankees on July 6 when he also had two homers and five RBI within the first four innings. The other was a 12–1 victory over the Athletics at the Coliseum on August 20 when he was a single away from becoming the first rookie in Orioles history to hit for the cycle, but got his second double of the game instead. He went 6-for-12 as the Orioles' best hitter during the ballclub's American League Division Series (ALDS) loss to the Texas Rangers. He finished the 2023 regular season with 28 HRs, 82 RBI, .814 OPS, and .255 AVG. On October 26, 2023, The Sporting News announced Henderson as their AL Rookie of the Year. Henderson was named the 2023 Major League Baseball Players Association Outstanding Rookie of the Year. He won the American League's Silver Slugger Award for utility players. Henderson unanimously won the American League Rookie of the Year Award.

=== 2024 ===
Henderson was awarded the March/April American League Player of the Month Award in recognition of his strong start to the 2024 season. In 29 games, Henderson slashed .291/.356/.624 with 10 home runs, 24 RBI and six stolen bases. A day after his 23rd birthday, Henderson announced that he would be taking part in the 2024 Home Run Derby. Henderson was selected to his first All-Star game in 2024. He finished the 2024 regular season with 37 HRs, 92 RBI, .893 OPS, .281 AVG, and 21 stolen bases, all career highs.

=== 2025 ===
On January 28, 2025, Henderson, along with Elly De La Cruz and Paul Skenes was named on the cover for MLB The Show 25, becoming the first Orioles player to make the cover since Cal Ripken Jr. in 1999. On March 12, 2025, Henderson's contract was unilaterally renewed by the Orioles.

=== 2026 ===
In the 2026 season, Henderson played in 158 games, recording 140 hits, 24 home runs, and 59 RBI.

== International Career ==
Henderson joined the United States national baseball team for the 2026 World Baseball Classic. In the tournament, he went 6-for-15 with a batting average of .400 and two home runs.

Awards
Preceded by Yordan Alvarez	American League Player of the Month; April 2024	Succeeded by Aaron Judge
