= MLB The Show 21 =

2021 video game

- Cover art featuring Fernando Tatís Jr.
- Developer: San Diego Studio
- Publishers: Sony Interactive Entertainment (Note: Distributor for Xbox version); MLB Advanced Media (Note: Xbox digital versions)
- Series: MLB: The Show
- Platforms: PlayStation 4; PlayStation 5; Xbox One; Xbox Series X/S
- Release: April 20, 2021
- Genre: Sports
- Modes: Single-player, multiplayer

MLB The Show 21 is a 2021 baseball video game developed by San Diego Studio and published by Sony Interactive Entertainment. The sixteenth installment in the MLB: The Show franchise, it was released on the PlayStation 4 and PlayStation 5, as well as the Xbox One and Xbox Series X/S (a first for the franchise) which included it being on Xbox Game Pass at the release for the first time. MLB Advanced Media co-published digital versions on Xbox consoles due to PlayStation's rivalry with Microsoft. This would also be the first MLB game released on an Xbox console since MLB 2K13. San Diego Padres shortstop Fernando Tatís Jr. is featured as the cover star, and at age 22 is the youngest player to do so.

== Gameplay ==
Matt Vasgersian, Mark DeRosa and Dan Plesac return as play-by-play commentators for the last time, Heidi Watney as sideline reporter and Alex Miniak as public address commentator.

New to the series is the ballpark creator feature, which gives players the ability to change ballpark dimensions, wall height, foul territory and other scenery options. This feature also allows players to share and download ballparks that other players have created online. It was exclusive to the ninth generation versions of the game.

A popular feature, year to year saves allowing players to carry their Road to the Show and Franchise Mode files over to the newer game was discontinued

== Release ==
For the first time in the series, the game was made available on Xbox consoles, with cross-platform compatibility between the PlayStation 4 and PlayStation 5. It was also announced that the Xbox versions of the game would be available for Xbox Game Pass subscribers at no additional cost at release, a decision made solely by digital co-publisher MLB Advanced Media and not Sony themselves. Cokem International distributed the physical versions for Xbox consoles.

Baseball legend Jackie Robinson was on the cover of his namesake editions, with $1 donated to his foundation for each copy of the edition sold in the United States.

== Reception ==
Reception

Aggregate score
Aggregator	Score
Metacritic	PS4: 79/100; PS5: 78/100; XSX: 81/100

Review scores
Publication	Score
Game Informer	8.5/10
GameSpot	7/10
GamesRadar+	4/5
Hardcore Gamer	4.5/5
IGN	8/10

MLB The Show 21 received "generally favorable reviews" from critics, according to review aggregate Metacritic.

GameSpot gave the game 7/10, praising the Stadium Creator and changes to pitching but criticizing the lack of additions to Road to the Show and Franchise modes, saying, "Much like its predecessors, MLB The Show 21 is still one of the best sports games available once you step over the foul line." GamesRadar+ gave the game 4/5 stars, calling it "a solid home-run hitter, but not the baseball revolution we were hoping for on PS5 and Xbox Series X." IGN gave it 8/10, saying: "MLB The Show 21 isn't the generational leap forward we might've expected following a new console launch, but it's still the best baseball sim you can play on any platform."

=== Sales ===
In the US, MLB The Show 21 was the best-selling digital game across PlayStation and Xbox platforms for the month of April 2021. By July 18, 2021, the game had surpassed 2 million sales across all platforms, with the game reaching 4 million players.
