= Heidi Watney =

American sportscaster (born 1981)

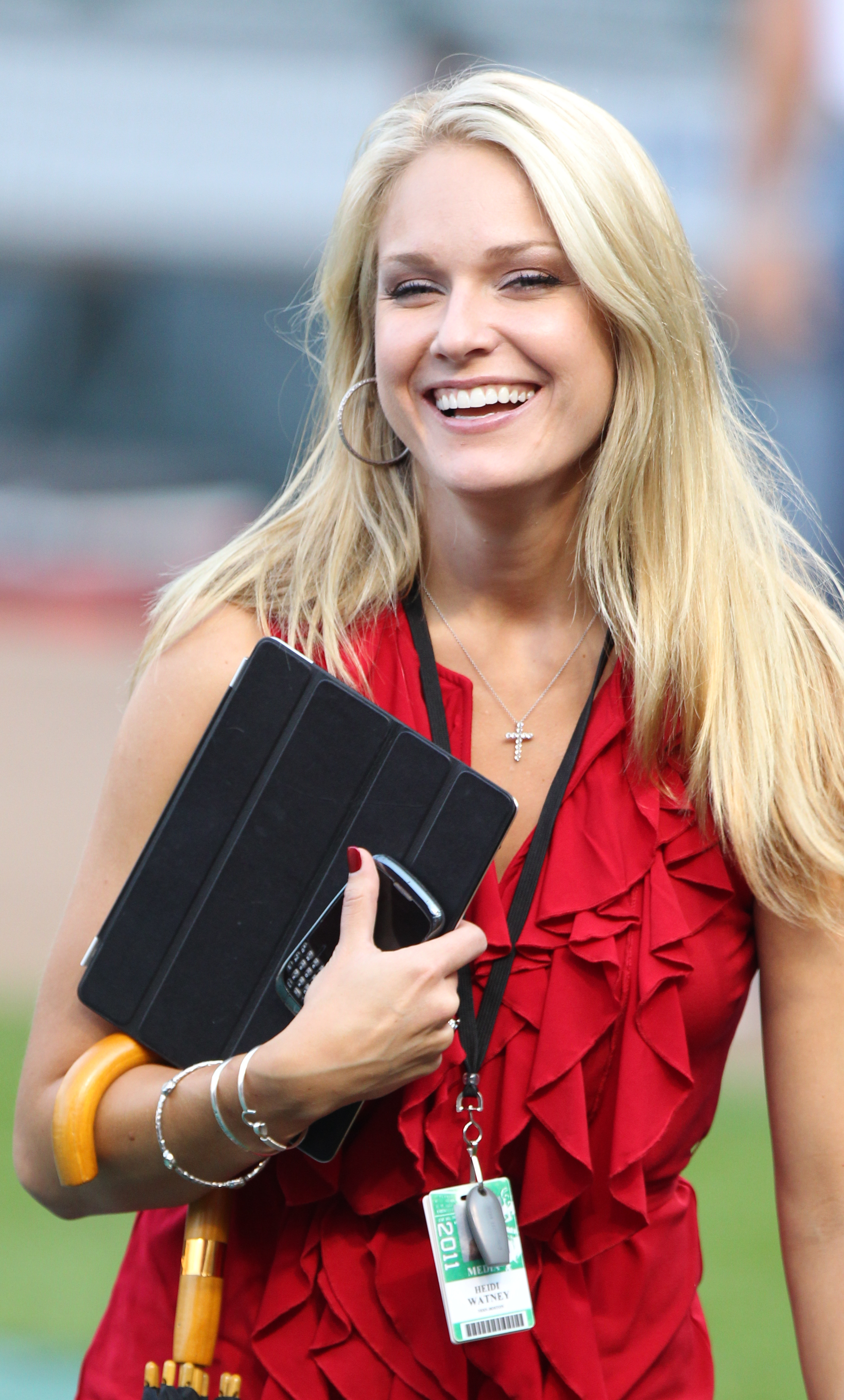
- Watney at Camden Yards in September 2011
- Born: May 19, 1981 (age 45); California, U.S.
- Education: University of San Diego (B.A., 2003)
- Years active: 2002–present
- Employer(s): Apple TV+ TNT Sports; CW Sports
- Spouse: Mike Wickham (m. 2014)
- Children: 2

Heidi Watney (born May 19, 1981) is an American sportscaster who serves as a reporter for Apple TV+.

A graduate of the University of San Diego, her past sportscasting experience includes roles at MLB Network, New England Sports Network in Boston, Time Warner Cable SportsNet in Los Angeles, and two stations in Fresno.

== Early life ==
Watney attended Clovis West High School in Fresno, participating in hurdles, diving, gymnastics and cheerleading. She was a National Merit Scholar and attended the University of San Diego on an academic scholarship, where she graduated with honors in 2003. Watney has competed in the Miss California USA pageant, where she was the first runner-up in 2002.

== Career ==
Beginning in September 2003, Watney worked for KMPH-TV (FOX 26) in Fresno. She started as the morning traffic reporter before transitioning to the weekend sports anchor and weekday sports reporter in 2005.

Watney moved to Massachusetts in 2008 and began working at New England Sports Network (NESN). She served as a gameday reporter for the Boston Red Sox. Watney also hosted Ultimate Red Sox Show and Red Sox Report.

In January 2012, Watney began working for Time Warner Cable SportsNet as a reporter for LA Galaxy. However, she was hired by MLB Network in November 2012 where she spent nine years. She is formerly the host of Quick Pitch. She joined Apple TV+ in 2022. Heidi Watney worked as a field level reporter for MLB on TBS in 2022.

== Personal life ==
Watney is the cousin of professional golfer Nick Watney.

Author Andy Weir stated he used Watney's surname for the character "Mark Watney" in his 2011 science fiction novel The Martian after hearing her name during a Red Sox game broadcast.

Watney appeared in the music video for the Dropkick Murphys' single "Going Out in Style." She has also been featured as the sideline reporter for the video games MLB The Show 19, MLB The Show 20 and MLB The Show 21.
