= MLB 10: The Show =

2010 video game

- PlayStation 3 cover art featuring Joe Mauer
- Developer: San Diego Studio
- Publisher: Sony Computer Entertainment
- Series: MLB: The Show
- Platforms: PlayStation 2, PlayStation 3, PlayStation Portable
- Release: NA: March 2, 2010
- Genre: Sports (baseball)
- Modes: Single-player, multiplayer

MLB 10: The Show is a 2010 baseball video game developed by San Diego Studio and published by Sony Computer Entertainment for the PlayStation 2, PlayStation 3 and PlayStation Portable. The game presents a number of new features, including catcher mode, and Home Run Derby. Catcher for the Minnesota Twins and 2009 American League MVP Joe Mauer is the cover athlete.

== Reception ==
Reception

Aggregate score
Aggregator	Score	
Aggregator	PS3	PSP
Metacritic	91/100	79/100

Review scores
Publication	Score	
Publication	PS3	PSP
1Up.com	B	N/A
Destructoid	8.5/10	N/A
Game Informer	9.5/10	N/A
GameSpot	8/10	N/A
GamesRadar+	4.5/5	N/A
GameTrailers	8.8/10	N/A
GameZone	9/10	8/10
IGN	8.9/10	N/A
PlayStation Official Magazine – UK	10/10	7/10
PlayStation: The Official Magazine	5/5	N/A
411Mania	9.5/10	N/A
The A.V. Club	A	N/A

The PlayStation 3 version received "universal acclaim", while the PSP version received "generally favorable reviews", according to the review aggregation website Metacritic.

The PlayStation 2 version of the game sold almost 200,000 copies.

During the 14th Annual Interactive Achievement Awards, the Academy of Interactive Arts & Sciences nominated MLB 10: The Show for "Sports Game of the Year".

== See also ==
- Major League Baseball 2K10
