= MLB 06: The Show =

2006 video game

- Cover art featuring David Ortiz
- Developer: San Diego Studio
- Publisher: Sony Computer Entertainment
- Directors: Scott Rohde; Brad Pollard
- Producers: Chris Cutliff; Chris Gill; Jody Kelsey
- Designers: Kolbe Launchbaugh; Eddie Cramm; Ed Brady; Lorne Asuncion
- Programmers: Tim Monk; Dan Enfield; Omar Canon
- Artist: Paul Hainey
- Writer: Ed Brady
- Composer: Chris Stevens (Note: Additional music courtesy of De Wolfe Music.)
- Series: MLB: The Show
- Platforms: PlayStation 2, PlayStation Portable
- Release: NA: February 28, 2006
- Genre: Sports (baseball)
- Modes: Single-player, multiplayer

MLB 06: The Show is a 2006 baseball video game developed by San Diego Studio and published by Sony Computer Entertainment for the PlayStation 2 and PlayStation Portable. It is the first game in the MLB: The Show franchise, after its predecessor series ended, and the first not released under the 989 Sports name. It is the first Major League Baseball title to carry the San Diego Studio name.

== Gameplay ==
=== In-game rosters ===
The game does not feature any MLB player who is not a member of the Major League Baseball Players Association. However, there are some fictional players in the game that are similar to these missing players, most notably 'Reggie Stocker', a fictional player standing in for Barry Bonds, a play on the name Bonds, as in security bonds, and Stocker, as in stock broker, two money related names.

=== Game modes ===
==== "The Show" mode ====
MLB 06: The Show features a career mode which is one of the game's unique features. This is known as "The Show" mode, giving the game its name.

In this mode, the user creates a player and attempts to take him to Major League stardom. The game features officially licensed Double-A and Triple-A baseball leagues and teams from the 2006 season. By performing well, users can eventually guide their player to the major leagues.

A unique aspect of the game mode is the user's controlling only one chosen player during gameplay, as opposed to the entire team. For example, if a player is pitching in a certain game, the gameplay will simulate half-innings in which the user's team is hitting. Also, a user-controlled starting pitcher's schedule will be simulated for all games in which the user does not pitch.

==== Season mode ====
MLB 06: The Show also features a Season mode in which users can carry one team through an entire 162-game season, and into the playoffs if the team performs well enough. Users can pick from the thirty current Major League Baseball teams and have the options to change team rosters, review scouting reports for opposing teams, and view statistics and standings. In this setting, all players on a team are user-controlled during gameplay, unlike "The Show" mode.

==== Franchise mode ====
Also featured in MLB 06: The Show is Franchise mode, where in addition to multiple 162-game seasons, users control every part of the team, such as hiring coaches and setting prices. Users can sign free agents, deal with player contracts, and achieve franchise goals unique to each team. This setting is similar to Season Mode, as all players on a team are user-controlled during gameplay, unlike "The Show" mode.

==== Home Run Derby ====
The game also features Home Run Derby, a mode based on the event taking place every year on the night before the MLB All-Star Game. Users are allowed to play as any position player and can select between 2 and 10 players from any major league team. Users also determine venue, number of outs, and time of day.

==== King of the Diamond ====
The game includes an arcade style game called King of the Diamond, a fast-paced baseball mini-game with timed innings and a points system. Users choose between Crimson and Cobalt teams and select one batter and one pitcher from any team in MLB for their team.

== Development ==
The game was first developed after Sony stopped using the 989 Sports name and started correcting the development studio as SCEA Sports Studio. The word "The Show" was added as a subtitle for all future Sony-produced MLB games to distinguish it from the simplified MLB 2006, a game from the same development team, and a new feature Rivalry Mode was added.

== Marketing ==
The game's marketing campaign consisted primarily of an extensive television advertising campaign with humorous 'spots' featuring MLB players with actors. David Ortiz of the Boston Red Sox was featured on the game cover. Ortiz, Don Zimmer, and Dave Campbell also appeared in TV spots advertising the game.

== Reception ==
Reception

Aggregate score
| Aggregator | Score | |
| Aggregator | PS2 | PSP |
|---|---|---|
| Metacritic | 83/100 | 83/100 |

Review scores
| Publication | Score | |
| Publication | PS2 | PSP |
|---|---|---|
| AllGame | 4/5 | 4/5 |
| Electronic Gaming Monthly | 5.5/10 | N/A |
| Game Informer | 7.5/10 | 7/10 |
| GamePro | 4/5 | N/A |
| GameRevolution | B | B |
| GameSpot | 9/10 | 8.6/10 |
| GameSpy | 4/5 | 4/5 |
| GameZone | 8.5/10 | 8.5/10 |
| IGN | 8/10 | 8.3/10 |
| Official U.S. PlayStation Magazine | 3/5 | 3.5/5 |

The game received "favorable" reviews on both platforms according to the review aggregation website Metacritic.

=== Awards ===
- Received IGN's award for Best PSP Sports Game of the Year in 2006.
- Nominated for AIAS' Sports Game of the Year in 2007.
