= Eric Karros =

American baseball player and commentator (born 1967)

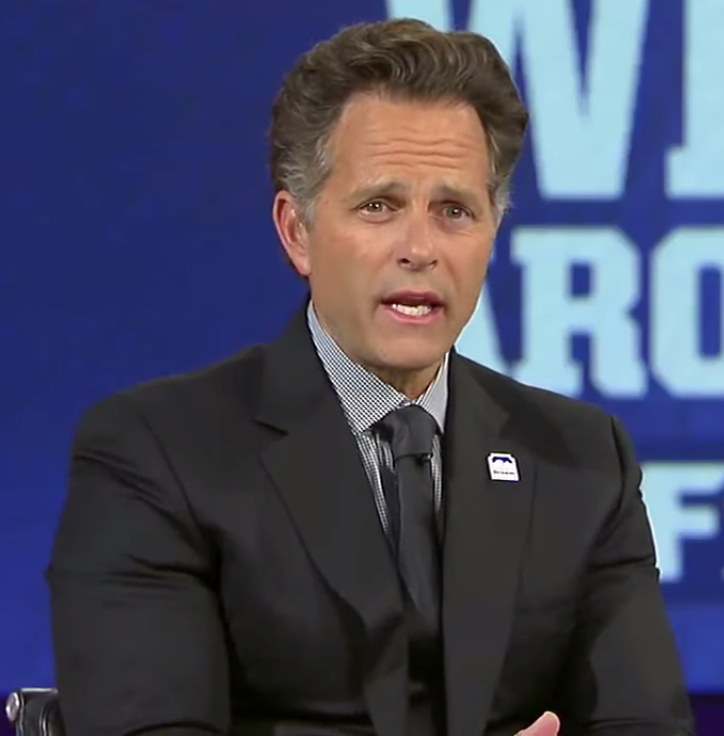
- Karros on MLB Whiparound in 2018
- First baseman
- Born: November 4, 1967 (age 58); Hackensack, New Jersey, U.S.
- Batted: Right Threw: Right

MLB debut
- September 1, 1991, for the Los Angeles Dodgers

Last MLB appearance
- July 21, 2004, for the Oakland Athletics

MLB statistics
- Batting average: .268
- Home runs: 284
- Runs batted in: 1,027
- Stats at Baseball Reference

Teams
- Los Angeles Dodgers (1991–2002); Chicago Cubs (2003); Oakland Athletics (2004)

Career highlights and awards
- NL Rookie of the Year (1992); Silver Slugger Award (1995)

Eric Peter Karros (born November 4, 1967) is an American former professional baseball first baseman who played 14 seasons in Major League Baseball (MLB), primarily with the Los Angeles Dodgers. He was the National League Rookie of the Year in 1992 and won a Silver Slugger Award in 1995. Karros currently works as a sportscaster, covering the Dodgers on Spectrum SportsNet LA.

== Early life ==
Karros was born in Hackensack, New Jersey, and graduated from Patrick Henry High School in San Diego, California. He attended the University of California, Los Angeles (UCLA), where he played on the UCLA Bruins baseball team and, in 1993, earned a degree in economics.

== Playing career ==
=== Los Angeles Dodgers ===
The Los Angeles Dodgers selected Karros in the sixth round of the 1988 Major League Baseball draft. He made his Major League debut as a pinch runner on September 1, 1991, against the Chicago Cubs. He made his first start, at first base, on September 4, 1991, against the St. Louis Cardinals, when he was 0-for-3 with two strikeouts. Karros recorded his first Major League hit as a pinch hitter in the bottom of the 12th inning against Cincinnati Reds pitcher Milt Hill on September 16, 1991. It was a two-run run batted in (RBI) double to left field, his only hit in 14 batting appearances during the 1991 season.

In his first at-bat of the 1992 season, on April 9 against the San Diego Padres, Karros hit a two-run shot to deep left field off of Craig Lefferts for his first career home run. He became a full-time starter for the Dodgers that season, appearing in 149 games and hitting 20 home runs while driving in 88 runs. He was named the 1992 National League Rookie of the Year. Karros put up consistent numbers throughout his career with the Dodgers, with a batting average just under .270 and an average of almost 25 home runs a year. He became the third Dodgers player in history to record 30 home runs and 100 RBIs in five different seasons (alongside Duke Snider and Gil Hodges). Karros also remains the only player in Dodgers history to hit two homers in the same inning, accomplishing the feat on August 22, 2000. 1999 was his best statistical year with the Dodgers, when he hit .304 with 34 home runs and 112 RBIs. His career 270 home runs as a Los Angeles Dodger are the most since the team moved to Los Angeles, and third in all-time Dodgers history.

=== Chicago Cubs ===
On December 2, 2002, the Dodgers traded Karros and Mark Grudzielanek to the Chicago Cubs in exchange for Todd Hundley and Chad Hermansen. Karros started the season as the Cubs' backup first baseman but took over the role at the beginning of June after Hee-seop Choi was injured in a collision with Cubs teammate Kerry Wood. After playing the 2003 season with the Cubs he was granted free agency from the team at the end of the year. In 114 games with the Cubs, he hit .286 with 12 home runs and 40 RBIs.

=== Oakland Athletics ===
Karros signed with the Oakland Athletics before the start of the 2004 season. Karros’ final MLB game was on July 21, 2004, and he was released by the Athletics on August 3, 2004. He only appeared in 40 games with the team, hitting .194 with two home runs and 11 RBI.

=== Career statistics ===
Years	Games	PA	AB	R	H	2B	3B	HR	RBI	BB	SO	AVG	OBP	SLG	FLD%
14	1755	7100	6441	797	1724	324	11	284	1027	552	1167	.268	.325	.454	.993

In 15 postseason games (1995, 1996 and 2003 National League Division Series, 2003 National League Championship Series), Karros batted .300 (15-for-50) with nine runs, four home runs and six RBI.

== Highlights ==
- 1992 National League Rookie of the Year
- 1995 National League Silver Slugger Award at First Base
- Finished 5th in voting for 1995 National League MVP
- Los Angeles Dodgers career sacrifice flies leader (74)
- Second-most career home runs for a player born in New Jersey (284)
- Second-most career home runs (behind Tim Salmon) for any player in MLB history who never appeared in the All-Star Game
- His career 270 home runs as a Los Angeles Dodger are the most since the team moved to Los Angeles, and third in all-time Dodgers history.

== Broadcasting career ==
Karros works as a color commentator for baseball on Fox. He previously worked for Fox Sports in 2004 doing the pregame shows for the Major League Baseball playoffs, and ESPN until 2006 as a studio and game analyst. He previously worked on KCAL-TV in Los Angeles, where he did the pre-game show for Dodger games. Karros was a co-broadcaster in the MLB: The Show titles, debuting on MLB 11: The Show, commentating with Matt Vasgersian, Dave Campbell and Steve Lyons.

Karros was hired to call regional games for Fox Saturday Baseball in 2007. He was promoted to the secondary team in 2011, primarily calling games with Thom Brennaman. In March 2014, it was announced that Brennaman and Karros would continue to call FOX games together, and the pair called the first regular season game ever on Fox Sports 1.

In March 2022, Karros returned to his Dodger broadcasting post as he joined the Spectrum SportsNet LA network.

== Personal life ==
Karros and his wife Trish have three children. Their sons Kyle and Jared both played college baseball at UCLA. Jared was selected by the Dodgers in the 2022 MLB draft and Kyle by the Colorado Rockies in the 2023 MLB draft; he made his MLB debut for the Rockies in 2025.

== See also ==
- List of Major League Baseball career home run leaders
- List of Major League Baseball career runs batted in leaders
