= Chris Singleton (baseball) =

American baseball player (born 1972)

- Center fielder
- Born: August 15, 1972 (age 54); Martinez, California, U.S.
- Batted: Left Threw: Left

MLB debut
- April 10, 1999, for the Chicago White Sox

Last MLB appearance
- May 19, 2005, for the Tampa Bay Devil Rays

MLB statistics
- Batting average: .273
- Home runs: 45
- Runs batted in: 276
- Stats at Baseball Reference

Teams
- Chicago White Sox (1999–2001); Baltimore Orioles (2002); Oakland Athletics (2003); Tampa Bay Devil Rays (2005)

Christopher Verdell Singleton (born August 15, 1972) is an American sportscaster and former professional baseball outfielder. He played most of his career as a center fielder for six seasons in Major League Baseball, from 1999 to 2005. He played for the Chicago White Sox (1999-2001), Baltimore Orioles (2002), Oakland Athletics (2003) and Tampa Bay Devil Rays (2005). During his playing career, his listed height and weight were 6'2", 210 pounds. He batted and threw left-handed.

== Baseball career ==
Selected by the Houston Astros in the 30th round (790th overall) of the 1990 Major League Baseball draft, Singleton opted to attend the University of Nevada. His stock rose considerably over the next three years, and he was selected by the San Francisco Giants in the 2nd round (48th overall) of the 1993 Major League Baseball draft. On November 11, 1997, he was traded by the Giants with pitcher Alberto Castillo to the New York Yankees for Charlie Hayes and cash. On December 8, 1998, the Yankees dealt him to the White Sox for minor leaguer Rich Pratt.

Upon reaching the majors in 1999, Singleton hit .300 with 17 home runs and 74 RBI, but his power numbers dropped precipitously each season thereafter. A highlight of his 1999 season was on July 6, when he hit for the cycle becoming the first White Sox player to hit for the cycle in 15 years. On January 29, 2002, he was traded by the White Sox to the Baltimore Orioles for Willie Harris.

Singleton had signed to play with the Pittsburgh Pirates in 2004, but his contract was voided after he failed a physical exam. The team cited a pre-existing ear condition, which had initially been diagnosed as a simple infection, but ultimately proved to be something more serious. On January 21, 2005, he signed with the Tampa Bay Devil Rays, but was released on July 4 after just 59 at-bats.

Singleton trained at EVO Ultrafit in Phoenix, Arizona, throughout his career.

== Broadcasting career ==
Paired with play-by-play man and former major league pitcher Ed Farmer, Singleton was the color commentator on Chicago White Sox radio broadcasts for the 2006 and 2007 seasons. However, on March 4, 2008, it was announced he would be leaving that position to take on an analyst role with the ESPN television program Baseball Tonight. He was replaced by former Chicago Cubs television broadcaster Steve Stone. Singleton also served as lead game analyst for ESPN Radio's baseball coverage from 2011 to 2021, teaming with play-by-play announcers Dan Shulman and Jon Sciambi to call Sunday Night Baseball as well as All-Star Game and postseason broadcasts for the network. In 2021 he was hired as a part-time analyst for Milwaukee Brewers telecasts on Bally Sports Wisconsin.

== Personal life ==
Singleton is not related to former MLB player Ken Singleton, though Chris was often mistaken for being Ken's son during his career. When Chris Singleton was on the Orioles, he chose to wear the same number 29 that Ken Singleton wore during his career as an Oriole.

== Other ==
Singleton was featured in MLB The Show 25 as a broadcaster along with Jon Sciambi.

== See also ==
- List of Major League Baseball players to hit for the cycle

Achievements
Preceded by Todd Helton	Hitting for the cycle July 6, 1999	Succeeded by José Valentín
