= Dave Campbell (infielder) =

American baseball player (born 1942)

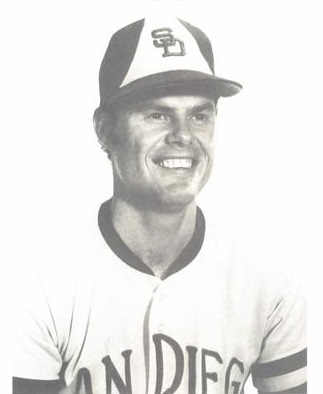
- Infielder
- Born: January 14, 1942 (age 84); Manistee, Michigan, U.S.
- Batted: Right Threw: Right

MLB debut
- September 17, 1967, for the Detroit Tigers

Last MLB appearance
- September 30, 1974, for the Houston Astros

MLB statistics
- Batting average: .213
- Home runs: 20
- Runs batted in: 89
- Stats at Baseball Reference

Teams
- Detroit Tigers (1967–1969); San Diego Padres (1970–1973); St. Louis Cardinals (1973); Houston Astros (1973–1974)

David Wilson Campbell (born January 14, 1942) is an American former baseball player and sportscaster. He played parts of eight seasons in Major League Baseball (MLB), primarily as an infielder for the San Diego Padres. He was nicknamed "Soup", a reference to the brand name Campbell's Soup.

== Biography ==
Campbell began his playing career with the University of Michigan, where he was a member of Sigma Alpha Epsilon fraternity, and signed with the Detroit Tigers' system as an amateur free agent in 1964. He played as a utility infielder for the Tigers, San Diego Padres, St. Louis Cardinals, and Houston Astros in a major league career that spanned eight seasons, 1967 to 1974.

In the late 1970s, Campbell began a career in broadcasting, doing radio play-by-play for the Padres as well as San Diego State football and basketball. In the 1990s, he was the Colorado Rockies' color commentator, and from 1990 to 2010 he worked for ESPN as a color commentator for the network's television and radio coverage of Major League Baseball (most notably on ESPN Radio's national Sunday Night Baseball broadcasts), as well as a commentator on Baseball Tonight and other studio shows. His voice can also be heard in two video game series, MLB: The Show and 989 Sports MLB for PlayStation 3, PlayStation 2, PlayStation, and PlayStation Portable. In 2021 Baseball Hall of Fame balloting, Campbell was a finalist for the Ford C. Frick Award, presented annually by the National Baseball Hall of Fame.
