= List of current Major League Baseball broadcasters =

Current MLB broadcasters

The following is a list of current Major League Baseball broadcasters, as of the 2027 season, for each individual team. Some franchises have a regular color commentator while others, such as the Milwaukee Brewers, use two play-by-play announcers, with the primary often doing more innings than the secondary. Secondary play-by-play announcers are noted by bold and the number of innings of play-by-play are listed in "Radio Broadcaster Inning Formats".

== Regional television broadcasters ==
Non-English broadcasters

=== American League ===
Team	Primary play-by-play	Secondary play-by-play or color analyst	Field reporter(s)	Studio host(s)	Studio analyst(s)	Flagship station(s)	Over-the-air affiliates	Direct-to-consumer streaming
Athletics	Jenny Cavnar (primary, most away games and select home games); Chris Caray (secondary, most home games and select away games)	Dallas Braden (primary); Shooty Babitt (select games); Jerry Blevins (select games); Tony Kemp (select games); Steve Sax (select games)		Chris Townsend (primary)	Shooty Babitt, Steve Sax, Bip Roberts, Jonny Gomes, or Tony Kemp	NBC Sports California; NBC Sports California Plus (if there's conflict with the Sharks or Kings)	1 (KVVU-TV, 15 games)	NBC Sports App; Peacock via add-on Athletics.tv via MLB.tv
Baltimore	Kevin Brown (primary); Ben Wagner (select games when Brown is working for ESPN); Brett Hollander (select games when Brown is working for ESPN)	Jim Palmer (primary); Ben McDonald (select games); Cal Ripken Jr. (select games); Brian Roberts (select games); Brad Brach (select games)	Rob Long	Melanie Newman (primary); Brett Hollander (select games); Rob Long (select games)	Ben McDonald (games he's not broadcasting); Jim Palmer (games he's not broadcasting); Brad Brach (select games)	MASN	None	MASN+
Boston	Dave O'Brien (primary); Mike Monaco (select games when O’Brien is on ESPN assignment or off); Emma Tiedemann (select games)	Lou Merloni (primary); Will Middlebrooks (select games); Kevin Millar (select games); Alanna Rizzo (select games)	Jahmai Webster (primary); Tom Caron (select games)	Tom Caron (primary); Adam Pellerin (select games); Alanna Rizzo (select games)	Jim Rice, Lenny DiNardo, Will Middlebrooks, Rich Hill, Jonathan Papelbon, J. P. Ricciardi, Matt Barnes, Manny Delcarmen	NESN	4 (Note: Affiliates include: WHDH (Boston); WWAX-LD (Harford, CT); WPXT (Portland, ME); WYCI (Burlington, VT)) (4 spring training games)	NESN 360
Chicago White Sox	TBD (primary); Connor McKnight (select games)	Steve Stone (primary); Brooke Fletcher (select games); Gordon Beckham (select games); Connor McKnight (select games); Dan Plesac (select games)	Brooke Fletcher (primary); Connor McKnight (select games)	Chuck Garfien (primary); Connor McKnight (select games)	Frank Thomas, Ozzie Guillen, Brian Anderson	Chicago Sports Network	7 (Note: Affiliates include: KDMI-DT3 (Des Moines, IA); KMEG-DT5 (Sioux City, IA); KWKB-DT5 (Cedar Rapids, IA); WDKA-DT7 (Paducah, KY); WHMB-DT2 (Indianapolis, IN); WVTV (Milwaukee, WI); WWMT (Grand Rapids, MI)) (All games); 1 (WCIU-TV, 10 simulcasts)	Chicago Sports Network
Cleveland	Matt Underwood (primary); Al Pawlowski (select games during Underwood's absences)	Rick Manning (primary); Chris Gimenez (select games)	Andre Knott (primary); Cayleigh Griffin (select games)	Al Pawlowski (primary); Cayleigh Griffin (select games)	Chris Gimenez, Cody Allen, Ben Broussard, Nick Goody, Austin Jackson, Jason Kipnis	MLB Local Media (distributed to cable providers and MLB.tv)	3 (Note: Affiliates include: WKYC (Cleveland); WSEE-TV (Erie, Pennsylvania); WBNS-DT2 (Columbus)) (10 games)	Guardians.tv via MLB.tv
Detroit	Jason Benetti (primary); Dan Dickerson (select games when Benetti is on NBC / Lions assignment)	Andy Dirks (primary); Dan Petry (select games); Bobby Scales (select games)	Daniella Bruce (primary); Johnny Kane (select games); Logan Reever (select games)	Johnny Kane (primary); Logan Reever (select games); Daniella Bruce (select games)	Dan Petry (select games); Andy Dirks (select games); Bobby Scales (select games); Todd Jones (select games)	Detroit SportsNet	7 (Note: Affiliates include: WJBK-TV (Detroit); WBSF/WSMH-DT2 (Flint–Saginaw–Bay City); WLNS/WLAJ (Lansing); WOOD-TV/WOTV/WXSP-CD (Grand Rapids); WTOL/WUPW (Toledo, Ohio); WWTV/WFQX-TV (Cadillac–Traverse City–Northern Michigan); WSBT (South Bend, Indiana)) (10 games)	Tigers.tv via MLB.tv
Houston	Todd Kalas (primary); Kevin Eschenfelder (select games)	Geoff Blum (primary); Jeff Bagwell (select games)	Julia Morales (primary); Lauren Callender (select games)	Kevin Eschenfelder (primary); Vanessa Richardson (select games); Lauren Callender (select games)	Brian Bogusevic; Josh Reddick	Space City Home Network	None	SCHN+
Kansas City	Ryan Lefebvre (primary); Jake Eisenberg (select games when Lefebvre is on radio)	Rex Hudler (primary); Jeff Montgomery (select games); Mike Sweeney (select games); Jeremy Guthrie (select games); Eric Hosmer (select games)	Bridget Howard (primary); Joel Goldberg (select games)	Bridget Howard (primary); Joel Goldberg (select games)	Jeff Montgomery, Mike Sweeney or Jeremy Guthrie	MLB Local Media (distributed to cable providers and MLB.tv)	16 (Note: Affiliates include: KCTV-TV/KSMO-TV (Kansas City); KAIT-DT3 (Jonesboro, Arkansas); KWCH-DT/KSCW-DT (Wichita, Kansas); WIBW-TV (Topeka, Kansas); KMIZ-DT3 (Columbia); KFJX-DT2 (Joplin); KYCW-LD (Springfield); KFVS-DT2 (Cape Girardeau); WOWT-DT2 (Omaha); KYOU-TV/DT3 (Ottumwa, Iowa); KWQC-TV/DT3 (Davenport–Quad Cities); KCRG-TV/DT2/DT3 (Cedar Rapids, Iowa); KTIV-DT2/DT3 (Sioux City, Iowa); KOLN/KSNB-TV/DT2/KCWH-LD (Lincoln, Nebraska); KNPL-LD/DT2/KIIT-DT2/KNOP-TV (North Platte, Nebraska); KSBI (Oklahoma City)) (10 games)	Royals.tv via MLB.tv
Los Angeles Angels	Wayne Randazzo (primary); Trent Rush (select games when Randazzo is on Apple TV assignment); Terry Smith (spring training games)	Mark Gubicza (primary); Tim Salmon (select games); Denny Hocking (spring training games); Bobby Grich (select games); Bobby Valentine (select games)	Erica Weston (primary); Carrlyn Bathe (select games)	Kent French (primary); Jaime Maggio (select games)	Tim Salmon (primary); Mark Gubicza (select games); Bobby Valentine (select games); Mark Langston (select games)	Angels Broadcast Television	1 (KCOP-TV, 12 games)	Angels.tv via MLB.tv
Minnesota	Cory Provus (primary); Anthony LaPanta (select games); Gregg Caserta (select games)	Justin Morneau (primary); LaTroy Hawkins (select games); Glen Perkins (select games); Tim Laudner (select games); Trevor Plouffe (select games); Denard Span (select games)	Audra Martin (primary); Katie Storm (select games)	Katie Storm; Tim Laudner	Tim Laudner; Glen Perkins (select games)	MLB Local Media (distributed to cable providers and MLB.tv)	12 (Note: Affiliates include: KMSP-TV (Minneapolis–Saint Paul); KXLT-TV/KTTC/DT2 (Rochester); KDLH/KBJR-TV (Duluth–Superior); KEYC-TV/KMNF-LD (Mankato); KXJB-LD/KVLY-TV (Fargo–Moorhead); KFYR-TV (Bismarck, North Dakota); KEVN-LD (Rapid City, South Dakota); KDLT-TV (Sioux Falls, South Dakota); KCRG-TV/DT2 (Cedar Rapids, Iowa); KWQC-DT3 (Davenport, Iowa–Quad Cities); KYOU-TV (Ottumwa, Iowa); KTIV (Sioux City, Iowa)) (10 games)	Twins.tv via MLB.tv
New York Yankees	Michael Kay (primary); Ryan Ruocco (select games); Justin Shackil (select games)	Paul O'Neill (primary); Joe Girardi (select games); David Cone (select games)	Meredith Marakovits, Jack Curry, Chris Shearn, Ryan Ruocco, Justin Shackil	Bob Lorenz, Nancy Newman, Chris Shearn, Ryan Ruocco or Meredith Marakovits	David Cone, Jack Curry, Todd Frazier, Nick Swisher, Dellin Betances, Willie Randolph, or Adam Ottavino	YES Network	None	DAZN (primary); Amazon Prime Video (21 games)
Seattle	Aaron Goldsmith (primary); Rich Waltz (select games)	Angie Mentink (primary); Ryan Rowland-Smith (select games); Jay Buhner (select games); Dave Valle (select games); Ryon Healy (select games)	Brad Adam (primary); Angie Mentink (most home games); Ryan Rowland-Smith (select home games)	Brad Adam (primary); Angie Mentink (games she's not broadcasting)	Ryan Rowland-Smith (primary); Dave Valle (select games); Jay Buhner (select games)	MLB Local Media (distributed to cable providers and MLB.tv)	17 (Note: Affiliates include: KING-TV (Seattle); KREM-TV, KSKN-TV (Spokane); KAPP-TV, KVEW-TV (Yakima/Richland, Washington/Pasco, Washington/Kennewick); KGW-TV (Portland, Oregon); KLSR-TV, KEVU (Eugene); KTVB-TV (Boise); KIFI (Idaho Falls/Pocatello); KTFT (Twin Falls); KULR (Billings); KTMF (Missoula); KWYB (Butte/Bozeman); KFBB (Great Falls); KHBB (Helena); KTUU (Anchorage); KFXF (Fairbanks); KUBD (TV) (Juneau); KGMB, KHNL (Honolulu)) (10 games)	Mariners.tv via MLB.tv
Tampa Bay	Dewayne Staats (primary); Andy Freed (select games)	Brian Anderson (primary); Doug Waechter (select games)	Ryan Bass (primary); Kendra Douglas (select games)	Rich Hollenberg (primary); Ryan Bass (select games); Kendra Douglas (select games)	Doug Waechter (primary); Matt Joyce (select games); Denard Span (select games)	MLB Local Media (distributed to cable providers and MLB.tv)	9 (Note: Affiliates include: WMOR (Bradenton–Tampa); WBBH-TV/WZVN-TV (Fort Myers); WCJB-TV (Gainesville); WJAX-TV/WFOX-TV (Jacksonville); WPLG (Miami–Fort Lauderdale); WESH/WKCF (Daytona Beach–Orlando–Clermont); WJHG-TV (Panama City, Florida); WALA-TV (Mobile, Alabama–Pensacola); WCTV (Tallahassee); WPBF (West Palm Beach)) (10 games)	Rays.tv via MLB.tv
Tampa Bay	Ricardo Taveras	Enrique Oliu					None	
Texas	Dave Raymond (primary); Jared Sandler (select games)	Mike Bacsik (primary); David Murphy (select games)	Laura Stickells (primary); Michelle Montaine (select games)	Jared Sandler	Elvis Andrus (select games); Brad Miller (select games)	Rangers Sports Network	26 (Note: Affiliates include: KDAF (Dallas-Fort Worth); KIAH (Houston); KCWX (San Antonio); KBVO (Austin); KALB/KLGC-LD/Gulf Coast Sports & Entertainment Network (Alexandria); KCPN-LD (Amarillo); WBRL-CD (Baton Rouge); KTSM-TV (El Paso); KXNW (Fort Smith-Fayetteville); KGBT-TV (Harlingen); KAIT (Jonesboro); KLFY-TV (Lafayette); KPLC (Lake Charles); KXNU-LD (Laredo); KLCW-TV (Lubbock); KASN (Little Rock); KNOE (Monroe-El Dorado); WNOL-TV (New Orleans); KWWT (Odessa); KAUT-TV (Oklahoma City); KXII (Sherman); KSHV (Shreveport); KQCW-DT (Tulsa); KTPN-LD (Tyler); KYLE-TV (Waco-Temple-Bryan); KJBO-LD (Witchita Falls-Lawton)) (15 games)	
Toronto	Dan Shulman (primary); Ben Shulman (select games)	Joe Siddall (primary); Caleb Joseph (select games); Madison Shipman (select games)	Hazel Mae (primary); Arden Zwelling (select games)	Jamie Campbell (primary); Hazel Mae (select games); Brad Fay (select games)	Caleb Joseph (primary); Madison Shipman (select games); Kevin Pillar (select games); Jason Grilli (select games); Chris Leroux (select games)	Sportsnet/ Sportsnet One	None	Sportsnet+
Toronto	Denis Casavant					TVA Sports (French TV)	None	None

=== National League ===
Team	Primary play-by-play	Secondary play-by-play or color analyst	Field reporter(s)	Studio host(s)	Studio analyst(s)	Flagship station(s)	Over-the-air affiliates	Direct-to-consumer streaming
Arizona	Chris Garagiola (primary)	Bob Brenly (primary); Luis Gonzalez (select games); Tom Candiotti (select games); Josh Collmenter (select games)	Jody Jackson (primary); Kate Longworth (select games)	Todd Walsh (primary); Jody Jackson (select games)	Joe Borowski, Mark Grace and/or Brandon Webb	MLB Local Media (distributed to cable providers and MLB.tv)	4 (Note: Affiliates include: KPNX (Phoenix); KMSB (Tucson); KOB (Albuquerque); KSL (Salt Lake City)) (10 games)	Dbacks.tv via MLB.tv
Atlanta	Brandon Gaudin (primary); Wiley Ballard (select games); Tom Hart (select games)	C. J. Nitkowski (primary); Jeff Francoeur (select games)	Wiley Ballard (primary); Nick Green (select games); Paul Byrd (select games)	Nick Green (primary); Wiley Ballard (select games); Tom Werme (select games); Sarah Plantz (select games); Lauren Sadd (select games); Paul Byrd (select games); Laura Britt (select games)	Peter Moylan (primary); Charlie Culberson (select games)	BravesVision/Gray Media	20 (Note: Affiliates include: WANF/WPCH-TV (Atlanta); WAGT-DT3 (Augusta); WGCW-DT3 (Albany); WBRC-DT3 (Birmingham); WTBL-DT3 (Biloxi); WIS/WPAM-DT2 (Columbia); WCTA-DT3 (Columbus); WBTV-DT2 (Charlotte); WZCH-DT2 (Charleston); WTVL-DT2/WDNN-DT2 (Chattanooga); WTVY-DT7 (Dotham); WHNS-DT2 (Greenville/Spartanburg); WAFF-DT3 (Huntsville); WLHA-DT2 (Hattiesburg); WLBT-DT3 (Jackson); WVLT-DT2 (Knoxville); WPGA-TV (Macon); WXIV-DT2 (Myrtle Beach); WALA-DT6 (Mobile); WSFA-DT3 (Montgomery); WOOK-DT3 (Meridian); WMC-DT5 (Memphis); WSMV-DT2 (Nashville); WPHJ-DT3 (Savannah)) (25 games)	Braves.tv via MLB.tv
Chicago Cubs	Jon Sciambi (primary); Alex Cohen (select games when Sciambi is on ESPN assignment or off)	Jim Deshaies (primary); Rick Sutcliffe (select games); Doug Glanville (select games); Elise Menaker (select games); Ron Coomer (select games); Joe Girardi (select games); Ryan Dempster (select games); Mark Grace (select games); Jon Lester (select games)	TBD (primary); Elise Menaker (select games)	Cole Wright (primary); Elise Menaker (select games)	Lou Piniella (select games); Doug Glanville (select games); Carlos Peña (select games); Dan Plesac (select games); Mark Grace (select games); Cameron Maybin (select games); Cliff Floyd (select games); Lance Brozdowski (select games); Ferguson Jenkins (select games); Sean Marshall (select games); Ryan Sweeney (select games); Dexter Fowler (select games); Jon Lester (select games)	Marquee Sports Network	None	Marquee Sports Network
Cincinnati	John Sadak (primary); Jim Day (select games); Tommy Thrall (select games)	Jeff Brantley (primary, away games); Chris Welsh (select games); Barry Larkin (Home games); Sam LeCure (select games)	Jim Day (primary); Brian Giesenschlag (select games)	Brian Giesenschlag (primary); Jim Day (select games)	Sam LeCure (primary); Chris Welsh (select games)	MLB Local Media (distributed to cable providers and MLB.tv)	15 (Note: Affiliates include: WXIX-TV/DT3 (Newport, Kentucky–Cincinnati); WAVE/DT3 (Louisville); WKYT-DT2 (Lexington); WBKO-DT3 (Bowling Green, Kentucky); WDEM-CD (Columbus); WTCL-LD/WOHZ-CD/W28FG-D (Cleveland–Canton–Akron); WFIE-DT2 (Evansville, Indiana); WPTA (Fort Wayne, Indiana); WNDU-DT3 (South Bend, Indiana); WSAZ-TV/WQCW (Huntington, West Virginia–Charleston–Portsmouth); WVLT-TV/WBXX-TV (Knoxville, Tennessee); WSMV/DT2 (Nashville); WMC-DT3 (Memphis); WBTV (Charlotte); WHNS (Greenville–Spartanburg, SC–Asheville, North Carolina)) (10 games)	Reds.tv via MLB.tv
Colorado	Drew Goodman (primary); Jack Corrigan (select games)	Jeff Huson (primary Ryan Spilborghs (select games); Cory Sullivan (select games)	Kelsey Wingert (primary); Marc Stout (select games)	Marc Stout (primary); Kelsey Wingert (select games)	Cory Sullivan (primary); Jeff Huson (select games); Ryan Spilborghs (select games)	MLB Local Media (distributed to cable providers and MLB.tv)	5 (Note: Affiliates include: KUSA/KTVD (Denver); KKTV (Colorado Springs); KSL (Salt Lake City); KGWN (Cheyenne, Wyoming); KCWY-DT (Casper, Wyoming)) (10 games)	Rockies.tv via MLB.tv
Los Angeles Dodgers	Joe Davis (primary); Stephen Nelson (select games when Davis is off or on assignment for Fox); Tim Neverett (spring training games)	Orel Hershiser (primary); Nomar Garciaparra (select games); Eric Karros (select games); Dontrelle Willis (select games); Jessica Mendoza (select games)	Kirsten Watson; Kelli Tennant; David Vassegh; José Mota	John Hartung (primary); Kirsten Watson (select games); Kelvin Washington (select games); Allie Clifton (select games)	Orel Hershiser (games he's not broadcasting); Nomar Garciaparra (games he's not broadcasting); Jerry Hairston Jr. (select games); José Mota (select games); Eric Karros (select games); James Loney (select games); Adrián González (select games); Jessica Mendoza (select games)	Spectrum SportsNet LA	None	SNLA+
Los Angeles Dodgers	Pepe Yñiguez	José Mota; Luis Cruz				Spectrum SportsNet LA via SAP (Spanish TV)	None	SNLA+
Miami	TBD (primary); Jack McMullen (select games)	TBD (primary); Gaby Sánchez (select games)	Kelly Saco (primary); Jeremy Taché (select games); Craig Mish (select games)	Kelly Saco or Craig Mish	Jeff Nelson (select games); Gaby Sánchez (select games); A. J. Ramos (select games); Rod Allen (select games); Craig Mish (select games)	MLB Local Media (distributed to cable providers and MLB.tv)	1 (WFOR-TV/WBFS-TV, 10 games)	Marlins via MLB.tv
Miami	Luis Quintana	José Nápoles (select games); Alberto Ferreiro (select games)				MLB Local Media (distributed to cable providers and MLB.tv)	None	Marlins via MLB.tv
Milwaukee	Jeff Levering (primary); Brian Anderson (select games when not working for TNT Sports)	Bill Schroeder (primary); Tim Dillard (select games); Vinny Rottino (select games)	Sophia Minnaert (primary); Stephen Watson (select games)	Craig Coshun (primary); Stephen Watson (select games)	Tim Dillard (primary); Vinny Rottino (select games)	MLB Local Media (distributed to cable providers and MLB.tv)	7 (Note: Affiliates include: WITI (Milwaukee); WISC-TV/DT2 (Madison); WJMN-TV Escanaba–Marquette, Michigan; WACY-TV/WGBA-TV (Green Bay–Fox Cities); WKBT-DT/DT2 (La Crosse–Eau Claire); KDLH/KBJR-TV (Duluth–Superior); WSAW-TV/DT4/WZAW-LD (Wausau–Rhinelander)) (10 games)	Brewers.tv via MLB.tv
Milwaukee	Hector Molina	Kevin Holden				WYTU-LD (Spanish TV)	1 (12 games)	None
New York Mets	Gary Cohen (primary); Steve Gelbs (select games)	Keith Hernandez (primary); Ron Darling (primary); Todd Zeile (select games); Jerry Blevins (select games); Daniel Murphy (select games)	Steve Gelbs (primary); Michelle Margaux (select games); Niki Lattarulo (select games); Laura Albanese (select games)	Gary Apple (primary); Eamon McAnaney (select games); Michelle Margaux (select games)	Todd Zeile (primary); Jim Duquette (select games); Anthony Recker (select games); Jerry Blevins (select games); Daniel Murphy (select games); José Reyes (select games)	SNY	10 (Note: Affiliates include: WPIX (New York City); WCCT-TV (Hartford, CT); WCWN/WRGB (Albany, NY); WYCI (Saranac Lake, NY); WSYT-MY43 (Syracuse, NY); WPNY-LD (Utica, NY); WICZ-DT2 (Binghamton, NY); WQMY (Williamsport, PA); WOLF-DT3 (Scranton, PA); WHAM-DT2 (Rochester, NY)) (28 games)	MLB.tv (WPIX games not included)
Philadelphia	Tom McCarthy (primary); Scott Franzke (select games when McCarthy is on CBS or NBC assignment)	John Kruk (primary); Ben Davis (select games); Rubén Amaro Jr. (select games); Cole Hamels (select games)		Michael Barkann	Ricky Bottalico (primary); Ben Davis (select games); Rubén Amaro Jr. (select games)	NBC Sports Philadelphia (primary); NBC Sports Philadelphia Plus (if there's a conflict with the 76ers or Flyers)	1 (WCAU, 10 games; mostly simulcasts)	NBC Sports App; Peacock via add-on Phillies.tv via MLB.tv
Pittsburgh	Greg Brown (Primary); Joe Block (select games); Rob King (select games)	Bob Walk (primary); John Wehner (select games); Neil Walker (select games); Kevin Young (select games); Matt Capps (select games); Michael McKenry (select games)	Hannah Mears (primary); Dan Potash (select games); Rob King (select games)	Rob King (primary); Dan Potash (select games); Hailey Hunter (select games)	Michael McKenry, Steven Brault, Alex Presley, Jordy Mercer or Kevin Young	SportsNet Pittsburgh	None	SNP 360
St. Louis	Chip Caray (primary); Stefan Caray (select games)	Brad Thompson (primary); Mark Sweeney (select games)	Jim Hayes (primary); Dani Wexelman (select games); Scott Warmann (select games)	Scott Warmann (primary); Dani Wexelman (select games); Jim Hayes (select games)	Al Hrabosky (primary); Ricky Horton (select games); Tom Pagnozzi (select games); Mark Sweeney (select games)	MLB Local Media (distributed to cable providers and MLB.tv)	13 (Note: Affiliates include: KMOV/Matrix Midwest (St. Louis); KFVS-TV/DT2 (Cape Girardeau–Paducah, Kentucky); KYTV/KSPR-LD/KYCW-LD (Springfield); KAIT/DT2 (Jonesboro, Arkansas); WBXC-CD (Champaign, Illinois); WEEK-TV/DT2/DT3 (Peoria, Illinois); WGEM-DT2 (Quincy, Illinois); WIFR-LD/WSLN (Rockford, Illinois); WFIE/DT2 (Evansville, Indiana); KCRG-TV/DT3 (Cedar Rapids, Iowa); KWQC-TV/DT3/DT4 (Davenport–Quad Cities); KTIV/DT2/DT3 (Sioux City, Iowa); WMC-TV/DT3 (Memphis)) (10 games)	Cardinals.tv via MLB.tv
San Diego	Don Orsillo (primary); Jesse Agler (select games when Orsillo is on assignment for TBS or Fox)	Mark Grant (primary); Tony Gwynn Jr. (select games)	Bob Scanlan (primary); Mariluz Cook (select games)	Mike Pomeranz (primary); Chris Ello (select games); Mariluz Cook (select games)	Bob Scanlan (select home games); Tony Gwynn Jr. (select games); Mark Grant (select games); Tim Stauffer (select games)	MLB Local Media (distributed to cable providers and MLB.tv)	2 (Note: Affiliates include: KFMB (San Diego); KESQ/KPSP-CD/KCWQ-LD (Palm Springs)) (10 games)	Padres.tv via MLB.tv
San Francisco	Duane Kuiper (primary); Dave Flemming (select games); Jon Miller (select games)	TBD (primary); Javier López (select away games); Shawn Estes (select away games); Hunter Pence (select away games)		Kylen Mills (primary); Bonta Hill (select games); Alex Pavlovic (select games)	Rich Aurilia, Shawn Estes, Sergio Romo, Ron Wotus, Randy Winn or George Kontos	NBC Sports Bay Area; NBC Sports Bay Area Plus (select spring training games and if there's conflict with the Warriors)	1 (KNTV, 16 games)	NBC Sports App; Peacock via add-on Giants.tv via MLB.tv
Washington	Dan Kolko (primary); Paul Severino (select games)	Kevin Frandsen (primary); Ryan Zimmerman (select games); Alex Avila (select games); Michael Morse (select games); Denard Span (select games)	Alexa Datt; Eric Bach	Alexa Datt; Eric Bach; Chad Ricardo	Kevin Frandsen	MLB Local Media (distributed to cable providers and MLB.tv)	2 (Note: Affiliates include: WTTG/WDCA (Washington, D.C.); WVIR-TV (Charlottesville, Virginia); WSVW-LD/WSVF-CD/WHSV-TV (Harrisonburg, Virginia); WWBT/WUPV (Richmond, Virginia); WDBJ/WZBJ (Roanoke, Virginia); WITN-TV (Greenville–New Bern, North Carolina); WRAL-TV/WRAZ (Raleigh, North Carolina); WECT (Wilmington, North Carolina)) (10 games)	Nationals.tv via MLB.tv

== Regional radio broadcasters ==
Non-English broadcasters

=== American League ===
Team	Primary play-by-play	Secondary play-by-play or color analyst	Field reporter(s)	Studio host(s)	Studio analyst(s)	Flagship station(s)	Number of affiliates
Athletics	Ken Korach (primary); Johnny Doskow (select games); Chris Caray (select games)	**Johnny Doskow** (primary); **Chris Caray** (select games); Tony Kemp (select games)		Chris Townsend (select games)		A's Cast (streaming); KSTE 650 AM (Sacramento); KNEW 960 AM (Bay Area)	0
Athletics						KIQI (Spanish Radio)	2
Baltimore	Brett Hollander (primary); Josh Lewin (select games)	**Josh Lewin** (primary); **Ben Wagner** (select games); Ben McDonald (select games)				WBAL-AM & WBAL-FM (1090 AM & 101.5 FM) & WIYY-FM	38
Boston	Will Flemming (primary); Sean McDonough (select games); Cooper Boardman (select games)	Will Middlebrooks (primary); Lenny DiNardo (select games); **Sean McDonough** (select games); **Cooper Boardman** (select games); **Mike Monaco** (select games); Lou Merloni (select games); **Joe Castiglione** (select games)		Joe Weil, Cooper Boardman, or Christian Arcand		WEEI-FM	56
Boston	Nilson Pepen					WAMG (Spanish Radio)	
Chicago White Sox	Len Kasper (primary); Connor McKnight (select games)	**Darrin Jackson** (primary)		Jeff Miller (primary)		WMVP	17
Chicago White Sox	Hector Molina	Billy Russo				WRTO (Spanish Radio)	
Cleveland	Tom Hamilton (primary); Jim Rosenhaus (select games); Ryan Mitchell (select games)	**Jim Rosenhaus** (primary); Tim Belcher (select games); Charles Nagy (select games); Pat Tabler (select games)		Jim Rosenhaus		WTAM/WMMS	28
Cleveland	Rafa Hernández-Brito; Octavio Sequera (fill-in)	Carlos Baerga				WARF (Spanish radio)	
Detroit	Dan Dickerson (primary); Greg Gania (select games when Dickerson is on TV); Dan Hasty (select games)	Bobby Scales (primary); Dan Petry (select games); Andy Dirks (select games)	TBD			WXYT-FM	47
Detroit	Carlos Guillén	Bárbaro Garbey				WXYT-AM (Note: home games only.) (Spanish Radio)	
Houston	Robert Ford (primary); Steve Sparks (select games, mainly spring training); Gerald Sanchez (select spring training games); Michael Coffin (select games); Kevin Eschenfelder (select games)	**Steve Sparks** (primary); **Todd Kalas** (select non-TV games or spring training); **Michael Coffin** (select games); Geoff Blum (select games); Shane Reynolds (select games)				KBME/KTRH	29
Houston	Francisco Romero	Alex Treviño				KLAT (Spanish Radio)	
Kansas City	Denny Matthews (home games and select road games); Jake Eisenberg (select road games); Ryan Lefebvre (select road games that Eisenberg is on TV); Steve Stewart (spring training games that are exclusively on MLB.com)	**Jake Eisenberg** (home games and select road games); **Ryan Lefebvre** (select games with Matthews that Eisenberg is on TV); **Steve Stewart** (games that Matthews does not work and select games with Matthews); Joel Goldberg (select games); Mike Sweeney (select games); Jeremy Guthrie (select games)		Josh Vernier		KFNZ and KFNZ-FM	75
Los Angeles Angels	Terry Smith (primary); Wayne Hagin (select games); Roger Lodge (select spring training games)	Mark Langston (primary); Bobby Grich (select games); Mark Gubicza (select spring training games)				KLAA / KSPN	7
Los Angeles Angels	Jose Tolentino					KWKW (Spanish Radio)	
Minnesota	Kris Atteberry (primary); Sean Aronson (select games when Atteberry is on TV)	**Dan Gladden** (primary); Paul Molitor (select games); Glen Perkins (select games)		Mark Genosky; John Vittas	Lexi Schweinert	WCCO or KMNB	
Minnesota	Alfonso Fernández	Tony Oliva				KMNV / KMNQ (Spanish Radio)	
New York Yankees	Dave Sims (primary); Emmanuel Berbari (select games)	Suzyn Waldman (primary); **Emmanuel Berbari** (select games with Sims)		Emmanuel Berbari		WFAN & WFAN-FM	28
New York Yankees	Rickie Ricardo	Francisco Rivera				WADO (Spanish Radio)	
Seattle	TBD (primary); Gary Hill (select away games); Aaron Goldsmith (select games); Rich Waltz (select games)	**Gary Hill** (primary); Ryan Rowland-Smith (select away games); Shannon Drayer (select away games); Dave Valle (select games); Jay Buhner (select games); Angie Mentink (select away games); **Brad Adam** (select games)	Shannon Drayer (primary); Mike Lefkoe (select games); Curtis Rogers (Select games)		Ryan Rowland-Smith (select games)	KIRO (primary); KTTH (if there is a conflict with the Seattle Seahawks)	28
Tampa Bay	Andy Freed (rotate every game between primary and secondary play-by-play); Neil Solondz (rotate every game between primary and secondary play-by-play); Chris Adams-Wall (select games)	Neil Solondz (rotate every game between primary and secondary play-by-play); **Andy Freed** (rotate every game between primary and secondary play-by-play); Doug Waechter (select games); Andy Sonnanstine (select spring training games w/ Solondz); Dante Bichette (select spring training games w/ Solondz); Grant Balfour (select games)		Chris Adams-Wall		WDAE (primary); WHNZ (if there is a conflict with the Tampa Bay Buccaneers)	21
Tampa Bay	Ricardo Taveras	Enrique Oliu				WGES (Spanish radio)	
Texas	Eric Nadel (primary); Matt Hicks (select games); Jared Sandler (select games); Ted Emrich (select games)	**Matt Hicks** (primary); **Eric Nadel** (select games); **Jared Sandler** (select games); **Zach Bigley (select games)**		Jared Sandler; Zach Bigley (select games)		KRLD-FM (primary); KRLD (if there is a conflict with the Dallas Cowboys)	70
Texas	Eleno Ornelas	José Guzmán				KFLC (Spanish radio)	
Toronto	Ben Shulman (primary); Eric Smith (select games when Shulman is on TV)	Chris Leroux (primary); Ben Nicholson-Smith (select games); Blake Murphy (select games)				CJCL	15
Toronto	Jeremy Filosa	Alex Agostino				CHMP-FM (French Radio)	

=== National League ===
Team	Primary play-by-play	Secondary play-by-play or color analyst	Field reporter(s)	Studio host(s)	Studio analyst(s)	Flagship station(s)	Number of affiliates
Arizona	TBA (primary); Mike Ferrin (select games); Greg Schulte (select games)	Tom Candiotti (primary); Luis Gonzalez (select games); Ken Phelps (select games); J. J. Putz (select games); Willie Bloomquist (select games); Randy Johnson (select games); Josh Collmenter (select games); Tuffy Gosewisch (select games)		Steve Zinsmeister		KTAR (daytime games); KMVP-FM (evening or weekend games)	22
Arizona	Oscar Soria	Rodrigo Lopez; Richard Saenz				KBMB (Spanish Radio)	5
Atlanta	Ben Ingram (primary); Joe Simpson (select games); Tom Hart (select games)	**Joe Simpson** (primary); **Ben Ingram** (select games); **Tom Hart** (select games); Darren O'Day (select games); Kelly Johnson (select games); **Kevin McAlpin** (select spring training games); Nick Green (select spring training games)		Barrett Sallee (primary); Ben Ingram (select games)	Chris Dimino (primary); Wiley Ballard (select games)	WCNN / WNNX	171
Chicago Cubs	Pat Hughes (primary); Zach Zaidman (fifth inning); Mick Gillispie (select games on spring training games on WSCR)	Ron Coomer (primary); Dave Otto (select games); **Zach Zaidman** (select games with Hughes); Mick Gillispie (select games); Randy Wehofer (select games)	Bruce Levine	Zach Zaidman; Matt Spiegel; Judson Richards		WSCR	44
Chicago Cubs	Miguel Esparza	Jorge Moreno				WRTO (Spanish Radio)	
Cincinnati	Tommy Thrall (primary); Jim Day (select games)	Jeff Brantley (primary); Chris Welsh (select games); Jim Day (select games); Sam LeCure (select games)		Dave Armbruster		WLW	52
Colorado	Jack Corrigan	**Jeff Dooley** (primary); Zach Goodman (select games)				KOA 850 AM & 94.1 FM (primary); Talk Radio 640 KHOW (conflict with Denver Broncos)	35
Colorado	Salvador Hernandez	Carlos Valdez				KNRV (Spanish Radio)	
Los Angeles Dodgers	Charley Steiner (primary); Tim Neverett (select games); Stephen Nelson (select games)	Rick Monday (primary); José Mota (select games)		Tim Cates or Kirsten Watson	David Vassegh	KLAC	18
Los Angeles Dodgers	Pepe Yñiguez	José Mota; Luis Cruz				KTNQ (Spanish Radio)	
Miami	Jack McMullen (primary); Craig Minervini (select games); Scott Kornberg (select games); Kyle Sielaff (select games)	Kelly Saco (select games); Jeff Nelson (select games); A. J. Ramos (select games); Rod Allen (select games)		Stephen Strom		WQAM; WQAM-FM	7
Miami	Luis Quintana	José Nápoles (select games); Alberto Ferreiro (select games)				WAQI (Spanish Radio)	
Milwaukee	Lane Grindle (primary, usually when Levering is on TV); Jeff Levering (select games when not on TV); Craig Coshun (select spring training games)	Josh Maurer (primary, usually with Grindle); **Lane Grindle** (select games when Levering is primary); Bill Schroeder (select national TV games); Tim Dillard (select games)			Jerry Augustine	WTMJ; WKTI (if there is a conflict with the Milwaukee Bucks during the playoffs)	36
New York Mets	TBD(primary); Keith Raad (select games); Pat McCarthy (select games)	**Keith Raad** (primary); **Pat McCarthy** (select games); John Franco (select games); Anthony Recker (select games)		Pat McCarthy (primary); Rich Ackerman (select games)		WHSQ	
New York Mets	Max Perez-Jimenez	Nestor Rosario				WINS-FM HD2 (Spanish Radio)	
Philadelphia	Scott Franzke (primary); Gregg Murphy (games without Franzke)	Kevin Stocker (primary); Larry Andersen (select home games)		Gregg Murphy		WIP-FM (primary); WPHT (if there is a conflict with the Philadelphia Eagles)	18
Philadelphia	Danny Martinez	Bill Kulik				WTTM (Spanish Radio)	2
Pittsburgh	Joe Block (primary); Greg Brown (select games)	John Wehner (primary); Bob Walk (select games); **Joe Block** (playoff games with Brown); Neil Walker (select games); Kevin Young (select games); Matt Capps (select games); Michael McKenry (select games)		Dan Zangrilli (primary)	Kevin Orie and/or Jack Zduriencik	KDKA-FM (93.7); KDKA (1020 AM/100.1 FM) (day games)	41
St. Louis	John Rooney (primary); Tom Ackerman (select games); Mike Claiborne (select games)	Ricky Horton (primary); **Mike Claiborne** (select games); Kyle McClellan (select games)		Mike Claiborne (primary); Tom Ackerman (select games); Matt Pauley (select games); Joe Pott (select games)	Kyle McClellan (select games)	KMOX	153
St. Louis	Polo Ascencio (home games)	Bengie Molina (home games)				WIJR (Spanish Radio)	
San Diego	Jesse Agler (primary); Sam Levitt (select games); Bob Scanlan (select games)	Tony Gwynn Jr. (primary); Mark Grant (select games)		Sam Levitt (primary); Matt Skraby (select games)	Bob Chandler (select games)	KWFN	
San Diego	Eduardo Ortega	Carlos Hernández and Pedro Gutiérrez				XEMO (Spanish Radio)	
San Francisco	Jon Miller (primary); Dave Flemming (select games); Duane Kuiper (select games for middle innings and select national TV games); Joe Ritzo (select games); Glen Kuiper (select games)	**Dave Flemming** (primary); **Duane Kuiper** (select national TV games); Hunter Pence (select games); **Joe Ritzo** (select games); F. P. Santangelo (select games); **Glen Kuiper** (select games)		Jon Miller, Dave Flemming, and Duane Kuiper		KNBR/KNBR-FM	14
San Francisco	Erwin Higueros (primary); Carlos Orellana (games without Higueros)	Tito Fuentes				KXZM (Spanish Radio)	
Washington	Charlie Slowes (primary); Josh Whetzel (select games)	**Dave Jageler**		Phil Wood; Craig Heist		WJFK-FM; WFED	15

=== Radio broadcaster inning formats ===
Under the broadcasters list above, in the secondary play-by-play/color analyst column, the secondary play-by-play broadcaster is bolded if they also do play-by-play (all of which are on radio). Identified below are which innings those broadcasters do play-by-play (including extra innings in bold, if applicable).

==== American League ====
- Athletics: Innings 3–4, 7, and **even extra innings**
- Baltimore: Innings 3–4, 6–7, and **even extra innings**
- Boston: Innings 3–4, 6–7, and **even extra innings**
- Cleveland: Innings 4–5
- Houston: Innings 3–4, 7 and **even extra innings**
- Kansas City: Innings 3–4, 6–7, and **even extra innings**
- Minnesota: Innings 4–6, and **odd extra innings** (formerly Innings 3–4, 6–7, and **odd extra innings** up through 2013)
- Seattle: Innings 3-4, 6–7, and **even extra innings** (formerly 3–4, 7, and **even extra innings** from 2011 to 2012 and 3, 6-7 and **even extra innings** from 2013 to 2024)
- Tampa Bay: Innings 3–4, 7–8, and **even extra innings** (Solondz and Freed switch every game so one will do innings 1–2, 5–6, 9, and **odd extra innings** for one game and the next game, that broadcaster will do play-by-play in innings 3–4, 7–8, and **even extra innings**).
- Texas: Innings 2–3, 6-7, and **even extra innings**
- Toronto: None; formerly Innings 3–4, 7 and **odd extra innings** (through 2020 season), and innings 5-6 (from 2013 to 2016)

==== National League ====
- Atlanta: Innings 4–6, and **odd extra innings**; Innings 3–4, 6–7, and **odd extra innings** when McAlpin fills in for Ingram and works with Simpson.
- Chicago Cubs: Inning 5; innings 3–4, 7 (for spring training games broadcast on MLB.com) Formerly innings 4-6 for select spring training games
- Cincinnati: Innings 3–4, 7 and **even extra innings**
- Colorado: Innings 2–3, 6–7, and **even extra innings**
- Miami: None; Formerly Innings 3–4, 7–8, and **even extra innings** (through the 2020 season)
- Milwaukee: Innings 3–4, 7, and **10-11, 14–15, 18-19**
- New York Mets: Innings 3–4, 7, and **even extra innings**
- Philadelphia: None; Formerly innings 4-5 (formerly home games only through 2020)
- St. Louis: Innings 3–4, 7, and **even extra innings**
- San Diego: None; formerly Innings 3–4, 7–8, and **even extra innings** (through 2020 season)
- San Francisco: Innings 3–4, 7, and **even extra innings**
- Washington: Innings 3–4, 6–7, and **even extra innings**

== National broadcasters ==
=== Television broadcasters ===
==== Regular season ====
Game	Play-by-play	Color commentator(s)	Reporter(s)	Network
MLB on NBC	Jason Benetti (primary); Matt Vasgersian (secondary); Dave Flemming (secondary); Tom McCarthy (secondary)	Rotating Analysts	John Fanta (primary); Caroline Pineda (secondary); Ashley ShahAhmadi (secondary); Erica Weston (secondary); Jordan Cornette (secondary)	NBC; NBCSN; Peacock; NBC Sports App
MLB on ESPN	Jon Sciambi (primary); Mike Monaco (secondary); Kevin Brown (secondary); Roxy Bernstein (secondary); Joe Buck (secondary)	Eduardo Pérez (primary); David Ross (secondary); Jessica Mendoza (secondary); Tim Kurkjian (secondary); Ben McDonald (secondary); Doug Glanville (secondary); Gregg Olson (secondary); Adam Ottavino (select games); Todd Frazier (select games)	Buster Olney (primary); Tim Kurkjian (secondary); Alden Gonzalez (secondary)	ESPN; ESPN2; ABC; ESPN app
MLB Tuesday on TBS	Brian Anderson (primary); Alex Faust (secondary); Brendan Burke (tertiary); Don Orsillo (select games); Brandon Gaudin (select games)	Ron Darling (co-primary); Jeff Francoeur (co-primary); Curtis Granderson (select games); Jimmy Rollins (select games)	Lauren Shehadi (postseason); Lauren Jbara (postseason)	TBS truTV; HBO Max
MLB Network Showcase	Matt Vasgersian (primary); Rich Waltz (select games); Gregg Caserta (select games); Paul Severino (select games)	Tom Verducci (primary); Yonder Alonso (select games); Mark DeRosa (select games); Dan Plesac (select games)	Jon Morosi (primary); Lauren Shehadi (select games)	MLB Network; ESPN app MLB.tv
MLB on Fox	Joe Davis (lead); Adam Amin (secondary); Kevin Kugler (tertiary); Kenny Albert (select games); Connor Onion (select games); Eric Collins (select games)	John Smoltz (lead); A. J. Pierzynski (secondary); Adam Wainwright (secondary); Eric Karros (tertiary); Tom Verducci (select games); Dontrelle Willis (select games)	Ken Rosenthal (lead); Tom Verducci (All Star game and postseason); Tom Rinaldi (features)	Fox; FS1; FS2; Fox One; Fox Sports App
Friday Night Baseball	Wayne Randazzo (Crew 1); Alex Faust (Crew 2); Rich Waltz (fill in)	Dontrelle Willis (Crew 1); Ryan Spilborghs (Crew 2)	Heidi Watney (Crew 1); Tricia Whitaker (Crew 2)	Apple TV
MLB on Netflix	Matt Vasgersian	Hunter Pence; CC Sabathia; Anthony Rizzo	Lauren Shehadi	Netflix

==== All-Star Games and postseason ====
Game	Play-by-play	Color commentator(s)	Reporter(s)	Network
2026 Major League Baseball All-Star Futures Game	Melanie Newman	Yonder Alonso; Sam Dykstra	Sandle Charles	NBC; Peacock
2026 Major League Baseball Home Run Derby	Matt Vasgersian	Hunter Pence; Anthony Rizzo	CC Sabathia; Lauren Shehadi	Netflix
2026 Major League Baseball All-Star Game	Joe Davis	John Smoltz	Ken Rosenthal; Tom Verducci	Fox; Fox One
2026 American League Wild Card Series	Tom McCarthy	Steve Stone; Geoff Blum; Adam Ottavino	Britney Eurton	NBC; NBCSN; Peacock
2026 American League Wild Card Series	Jason Benetti	Joe Girardi; Lou Merloni; Anthony Rizzo	Caroline Pineda	NBC; NBCSN; Peacock
2026 National League Wild Card Series	Matt Vasgersian	C. J. Nitkowski; John Kruk; Joey Votto	Ashley ShahAhmadi	NBC; NBCSN; Peacock
2026 National League Wild Card Series	Dave Flemming	Jim Deshaies; Mark Grant; Clayton Kershaw	John Fanta	NBC; NBCSN; Peacock
2026 American League Division Series	Alex Faust	Ron Darling	Lauren Jbara	TBS truTV; HBO Max
2026 American League Division Series	Brian Anderson	Jeff Francoeur	Lauren Shehadi	TBS truTV; HBO Max
2026 American League Championship Series	Brian Anderson	Ron Darling; Jeff Francoeur	Lauren Shehadi	TBS truTV; HBO Max
2026 National League Division Series	Joe Davis (Games 1–2); Kenny Albert (Game 3); Brandon Gaudin (Game 4)	John Smoltz	Ken Rosenthal	Fox; FS1; Fox One
2026 National League Division Series	Adam Amin	A. J. Pierzynski; Adam Wainwright	Tom Verducci	Fox; FS1; Fox One
2026 National League Championship Series	Joe Davis	John Smoltz	Ken Rosenthal; Tom Verducci	Fox; FS1; Fox One
2026 World Series presented by Capital One	Joe Davis	John Smoltz	Ken Rosenthal; Tom Verducci	Fox; FS1; Fox One

==== Spanish broadcasters ====
Game	Play-by-play	Color commentator(s)	Reporter(s)	Network
MLB en Telemundo Deportes	José Luis López Salido; José Francisco Rivera; Alfre Alvarez	Luis Eduardo Nieves; Edgar Lopez; Adriana Monsalve	Diego Arrioja	Universo; TeleXitos; Peacock
Fox Deportes MLB	José Pablo Coello; Gabriel Medina; Rodrigo Arana; Alfredo Morales	Jackson Ades; Paco Bolivar; Diego Venegas; Steffy Aranillas		Fox Deportes; Fox One
ESPN Béisbol de Grandes Ligas	Ernesto Jerez; Fernando Álvarez; Kenneth Garay; Jorge Eduardo Sánchez; Carolina Guillén	Guillermo Celis; Luis Alfredo Álvarez; Orlando Hernández; Carlos Nava; Eitan Benezra		ESPN Deportes; ESPN app
MLB En Vivo	Antonio de Valdés; Daniel Nohra	Enrique Burak; Nelson Cruz; Luis Alberto Martínez	Daniel Schvartzman	UniMás; Vix

=== Radio broadcasters ===
==== Regular season and the All-Star Game ====
Game	Play-by-play	Color commentator	Network
MLB All-Star Game; Home Run Derby; Sunday Night Baseball and Saturday Game of the Week	Jon Sciambi (select games); Roxy Bernstein (select games); Anish Shroff (select games); Dave O'Brien (select games); John Schriffen (select games); Tom Hart (select games); Mike Couzens (select games); Sean Kelly (select games)	Doug Glanville; Tim Kurkjian (fill-in); Chris Burke (fill-in); Gregg Olson (fill-in); Buster Olney (fill-in); Gordan Beckham (fill-in)	ESPN Radio

==== Postseason ====
Game	Play-by-play	Analyst	Network
MLB Postseason on ESPN Radio	Jon Sciambi (select NLDS and NLCS games and World Series); Mike Couzens (select ALDS and ALCS games); Dave O'Brien (select NLDS games); Roxy Bernstein (Wild Card series and select ALDS games); Michael Kay (Wild Card series)	Jessica Mendoza (select NLDS games and World Series); Eduardo Pérez (select ALDS and ALCS games, and World Series); Doug Glanville (select NLDS and NLCS games with Sciambi); Tim Kurkjian (Wild Card series with Kay and Select ALDS games); Gregg Olson (Wild Card Series with Bernstein and Select ALDS games)	ESPN Radio

==== Spanish broadcasters ====
Game	Primary play-by-play	Secondary play-by-play or color analyst	Network
MLB en TUDN Radio	Luis Quiñones Sánchez	Alberto Ferreiro; Jesús Acosta	TUDN Radio

== International broadcasters ==
=== Africa ===
Country	Broadcaster
Sub-Saharan Africa	ESPN

=== Americas ===
Country	Broadcaster
Hispanic America	ESPN
Argentina	Fox Sports
Brazil	ESPN
Canada (Note: Due to licensing restrictions, Toronto Blue Jays live telecasts outside Canada may not be available)	TSN and Sportsnet (English) RDS and TVA Sports (French)
(Caribbean Community) Caribbean	ESPN
Colombia	Telecaribe, IVC
Dominican Republic	Teleantillas, Coral 39
Mexico	TelevisaUnivision, Fox
Panama	TVMax
Puerto Rico	ESPN, Fox Sports, TBS, WAPA 2 Deportes
Venezuela	IVC, Televen, One Baseball Network, ByM Sport, SimpleTV

=== Asia ===
Country	Broadcaster
Central Asia	TBD
China	Douyin, BesTV
Hong Kong	SPOTV
Indian subcontinent	Star Sports
Indonesia	SPOTV
Israel	Sport5
Japan	NHK, Fuji TV, J Sports, SPOTV, Abema
Macau	SPOTV
Malaysia	SPOTV
Philippines	SPOTV
Singapore	SPOTV
Thailand	SPOTV
Vietnam	SPOTV
South Korea	SPOTV, Disney+
Taiwan	CTS, (Note: Over the air and cable broadcast only) EBC, ELTA, (Note: For Chunghwa Telecom MOD platform (including Hami Video)) Videoland

=== Europe ===
Country	Broadcaster
Andorra	Movistar+
Spain	Movistar+
Armenia	TBD
Austria	Sportdigital
Azerbaijan	TBD
Belarus	TBD
Bosnia and Herzegovina	Arena Sport
Croatia	Arena Sport
Czech Republic	O2 TV Sport
Denmark	Viaplay
Estonia	Go3 Sport
Finland	Viaplay
France	beIN Sports
(Georgia (country)) Georgia	TBD
Germany	Sportdigital
Hungary	Sport TV
Iceland	Viaplay
(Republic of Ireland) Ireland	TNT Sports
United Kingdom	TNT Sports
Italy	Sky Sport
Latvia	Go3 Sport
Liechtenstein	Sportdigital
Lithuania	Go3 Sport
Luxembourg	Sportdigital
Moldova	TBD
Montenegro	Arena Sport
Netherlands	ESPN
North Macedonia	Arena Sport
Norway	Viaplay
San Marino	Sky Sport
Serbia	Arena Sport
Slovenia	Arena Sport
Sweden	Viaplay
Switzerland	Sportdigital
Ukraine	TBD
United Kingdom	BBC

=== Middle East and North Africa ===
Country	Broadcaster
MENA	beIN Sports

=== Oceania ===
Country	Broadcaster
Australia	ESPN
New Zealand	ESPN
Pacific Islands	ESPN
Papua New Guinea	ESPN

==== All-Star Game and postseason ====
Game	Play-by-play	Analyst	Network
2026 Major League Baseball All-Star Game	Matt Vasgersian	Yonder Alonso	MLB International
2026 World Series	Dave Flemming	Dan Plesac	MLB International

== See also ==
- MLB Network
- MLB.tv
- Major League Baseball on television
- List of current Major League Soccer broadcasters
- List of current NBA broadcasters
- List of current NFL broadcasters
- List of current National Hockey League broadcasters

== Notes ==
1. Some Cincinnati Reds games also air on FanDuel Sports Network Indiana, FanDuel Sports Network South, and FanDuel Sports Network Southeast (channel varies by region).
2. Some St. Louis Cardinals games are also available on Bally Sports Indiana, Bally Sports South, and Bally Sports Southeast (channel varies by region).
3. If Jon Miller is off, Duane Kuiper will work the first 3 and last 3 innings on TV while Dave Flemming does the middle 3 innings on TV. On radio, Flemming does the first 3 and last 3 innings of play-by-play on radio and Kuiper does the middle 3 innings on radio.
4. If Kuiper is off, Flemming will work the first 3 and last 3 innings on TV, with Miller doing the middle 3 innings on TV. Miller also does the first and last 3 innings on radio and Flemming does the middle 3 innings.
5. If Flemming is off or is on assignment for NBC, Kuiper does TV for the first and last 3 innings and the middle 3 on radio. Miller does the first and last 3 innings on radio while doing the middle 3 on TV.
6. Joe Ritzo or Glen Kupier fills in on radio if 2/3 of the Giants primary play by play announcers are off.
