= List of Atlanta Braves broadcasters =

== Broadcast networks ==
=== Television ===
- WSB-TV and syndicated: 1966–72
- WTCG and syndicated: 1973–76
- WTCG/WTBS/TBS: 1977–2007
- FanDuel Sports South/Turner South: 1991–2025, 1999–2007
- FanDuel Sports Network Southeast: 2000–2025
- BravesVision: 2026–present
- WPCH-TV: 2008-12
  - Comcast/Charter Sports Southeast aired Peachtree TV broadcasts outside Atlanta DMA: 2008–10
  - FSN South aired Peachtree TV broadcasts outside Atlanta DMA: 2011–12
- Gray Media: 2025-present:
  - Georgia:
    - WPCH (2025), WANF (2025-present), WTOC, WRDW, WALB, WTVM, WTVL
  - South Carolina:
    - WIS, WHNS, WMBF, WCSC
  - Alabama:
    - WTVY, WSFA, WBRC, WAFF, WALA
  - Mississippi:
    - WLBT, WDAM, WTOK, WLOX
  - Tennessee:
    - WMC, WSMV, WVLT
  - North Carolina:
    - WBTV

=== Radio ===
- Atlanta Braves Radio Network: 1925–present

- WSB (AM): 1966–1991, 1995–2004
- WGST: 1992–1994, 2005–2009
- WNNX (FM): 2010–2013, 2019–present
- WCNN: 2010–present
- WYAY (FM) : 2014–2019

== Broadcasters by name ==
=== Current announcers ===
- Wiley Ballard: (reporter, 2024–present) BravesVision (and FanDuel, prior)
- Paul Byrd: (analyst/reporter/host, 2014–2022 and 2026–present) BravesVision (and FanDuel, prior)
- Charlie Culberson: (analyst, 2025–present) BravesVision pre/post game and Braves Radio Network
- Darren O'Day: (analyst, 2024–present) Braves Radio Network
- Jeff Francoeur: (analyst, 2017–present) BravesVision (and FanDuel, prior)
- Brandon Gaudin: (primary play-by-play, 2023–present) BravesVision (and FanDuel, prior)
- Tom Glavine: (guest analyst, 2010–present ) BravesVision (and FanDuel, prior)
- Nick Green: (host/analyst/reporter, 2015–present) BravesVision pre/post game (and FanDuel, prior) and Braves Radio Network
- Ben Ingram: (host, 2011–2019; play-by-play, 2019–present) Braves Radio Network
- Pete Manzano: (play-by-play, 1992–present) Atlanta Braves International Radio Network and TBS SAP
- Peter Moylan: (analyst, 2019–present) BravesVision pre/post game (and FanDuel, prior)
- C. J. Nitkowski: (analyst, 2024–present) BravesVision (and FanDuel, prior)
- Fernando Palacios: (analyst, 2003–present) TBS SAP
- Joe Simpson: (analyst/play-by-play, 1992–present) Braves Radio Network (TBS and FSN prior)

=== Former announcers ===
- Hank Aaron: (analyst, 1980) TBS and Braves Radio Network (deceased)
- Mel Allen: (play-by-play, 1965) Braves Radio Network (deceased)
- Erin Andrews: (studio host, 2002, 2003) TBS
- Tim Brando: (play-by-play, 1995–1997) SportSouth
- Jim Britt: (play-by-play, 1940–1952) Braves Radio Network, WBZ-TV (deceased)
- Brett Butler: (analyst, 2000) FSN South
- Chip Caray: (play-by-play, 1991–1992, 2005–2022) Fox Sports South and Fox Sports Southeast, TBS and Braves Radio Network
- Skip Caray: (play-by-play, 1976–2008) TBS, Turner South and Braves Radio Network (deceased)
- Darrell Chaney: (analyst, 1981–1982) TBS and Braves Radio Network
- Dave Cohen: (in-game reporter, 1997) FSN South
- Kelly Crull: (primary reporter, 2020–2023) Bally Sports South and Southeast
- Dizzy Dean: (play-by-play, color commentator, 1966–68) Braves TV (WSB-TV) (deceased)
- Charlie Donelan: (play-by-play, 1925) Braves Radio Network (deceased)
- Al Downing: (analyst, 2000) FSN South
- Leo Egan: (play-by-play, 1949–1950) Braves Radio Network (deceased)
- Frank Fallon (play-by-play, 1946) Braves Radio Network (deceased)
- Frankie Frisch: (analyst, 1939) Braves Radio Network (deceased)
- Ron Gant: (analyst, 2004–2006) TBS, Turner South; (analyst, 2011–2012) Peachtree TV
- Earl Gillespie: (play-by-play, 1953–1963) Braves Radio Network (deceased)
- Bump Hadley: (play-by-play, 1949–1952) Braves Radio Network, WBZ-TV (deceased)
- Milo Hamilton: (play-by-play, 1966–1975) Braves Radio Network (deceased)
- Merle Harmon: (play-by-play, 1964–1965) Braves Radio Network (deceased)
- George Hartrick: (play-by-play, 1943–1945) Braves Radio Network (deceased)
- Fred Hoey: (play-by-play, 1926–1938) Braves Radio Network (deceased)
- Tom Hussey: (play-by-play, 1939–1950) Braves Radio Network, WBZ-TV (deceased)
- Ernie Johnson Jr.: (play-by-play, 1993–1996, 2010) SportSouth and Peachtree
- Ernie Johnson Sr.: (play-by-play, 1962–1999) Braves Radio Network, TBS, SportSouth and FSN South (deceased)
- Lauren Jbara: (reporter, 2022–2023) Bally Sports South and Southeast
- Brian Jordan: (guest analyst, 2011–2012; analyst 2022) Bally Sports South and Southeast
- Jim Kaat: (guest analyst, 1987) TBS
- Bob Kelly: (play-by-play, 1953) Braves Radio Network (deceased)
- Mark Lemke: (analyst, 2007–2019) Braves Radio Network
- Bill Mazer: (play-by-play, 1964) Braves Radio Network
- Larry Munson: (play-by-play, 1966–1967) Braves Radio Network (deceased)
- Dale Murphy: (guest analyst, 2012) Fox Sports South and Fox Sports Southeast
- Dave O'Brien: (play-by-play, 1990–1991) TBS and Braves Radio Network
- Tom Paciorek: (analyst, 2001–2005) FSN South
- Jim Powell: (play-by-play, 2009–2023) Braves Radio Network
- Bob Rathbun: (play-by-play, 1997–2006) FSN South and Turner South
- Billy Sample: (analyst, 1988–1989) TBS and Braves Radio Network
- Chris Schenkel: (play-by-play, 1954) Braves Radio Network (deceased)
- Jon Sciambi: (play-by-play, 2007–2009) FSN South and SportSouth
- Les Smith (play-by-play, color commentator, 1948–1952) Braves Radio Network, WNAC-TV
- John Smoltz: (guest analyst, color commentator, 2008, 2010, 2014, 2023) FanDuel Sports Network South and Southeast
- John Sterling: (play-by-play, 1982–1987) TBS and Braves Radio Network (deceased)
- Don Sutton: (play-by-play, and analyst 1989–2006, 2009–2018) TBS and Braves Radio Network (deceased)
- Jeff Torborg: (analyst, 2006) FSN South and Turner South
- Pete Van Wieren: (play-by-play, 1976–2008) Braves Radio Network, TBS, and Turner South (deceased)
- Blaine Walsh: (play-by-play, 1954–1965) Braves Radio Network (deceased)

== Studio hosts ==
=== Current ===
- Gordon Beckham: (TV analyst, 2022–present) Bally Sports South and Bally Sports Southeast
- Kelly Crull: (fill-in TV host, 2020–present) Bally Sports South and Bally Sports Southeast
- Jeff Francoeur: (TV analyst, 2017–present) Bally Sports South and Bally Sports Southeast
- Nick Green: (TV analyst, 2015–present) Fox Sports South and Fox Sports Southeast
- Ben Ingram: (radio host, 2011–2019) Braves Radio Network
- Kevin McAlpin: (radio host, 2012–present) Braves Radio Network
- Peter Moylan: (TV analyst, 2019–present) Bally Sports South and Bally Sports Southeast
- Treavor Scales: (TV host, 2022–present) Bally Sports South and Bally Sports Southeast

=== Former ===
- Erin Andrews: (host, 2002–2003) TBS
- Paul Byrd: (TV analyst/reporter, 2014–2022) Bally Sports South and Bally Sports Southeast
- Chip Caray: (radio host, 2007–2010) Braves Radio Network
- Dave Cohen: Host Braves Report Fox Sports South 1997; Braves Radio Network 1998–2001
- Mitch Evans: (radio host, 2007–2010) Braves Radio Network
- Marc Fein: (host, 2005–2007) TBS
- Bob Fiscella: (host, 2005–2006) FSN South
- Matt Diaz: (TV analyst, 2014–2015) FSN South and SportSouth
- Brian Jordan: (TV analyst, 2011–2022) Bally Sports South and Bally Sports Southeast
- Jerome Jurenovich: (TV host, 2007–2021) Bally Sports South and Bally Sports Southeast
- Stu Klitenic: (host, 2005–2006) Braves Radio Network
- Bill Shanks: (analyst, 2006) Braves Radio Network
- Daron Sutton: (host of The Dodge Braves Report, 1998–1999 on Fox Sports South, a half-hour pre-game show.)
- Kelsey Wingert: (Reporter/host, 2016–2020) Fox Sports South and Fox Sports Southeast

== See also ==
- Braves TBS Baseball
- List of current Major League Baseball broadcasters
