= List of Seattle Mariners broadcasters =

The following is a list of people who have worked on Seattle Mariners local radio and television broadcasts.

== Current broadcast team ==
- Aaron Goldsmith (2013–present)
- Gary Hill Jr. (2010–present)
- Jay Buhner (2002–2005, 2011–2012, 2025-present)
- Ryon Healy (2026-present)
- Angie Mentink (2026-present)
- Ryan Rowland-Smith (2025-present)
- Dave Valle (1997–2006, 2011–2012, 2025-present)
- Steve Guasch (Spanish language, 2023–present)

== Former broadcasters ==
- Rick Rizzs (1983–1991, 1995–2026)
- Mike Blowers (2007–2024)
- Ken Brett (1986)
- Nelson Briles (1984–1985)
- Chip Caray (1993–1997)
- Julio Cruz (Spanish language, 2002–2021)
- Ron Fairly (1993–2006, 2011–2012)
- Bill Freehan (1979–1980)
- Greg Gumbel (1991)
- Dave Henderson (1997–2006, 2011–2012)
- Ken Levine (1992–1994, 2011–2012)
- Dave Niehaus (1977–2010)
- Tom Paciorek (2001)
- Amaury Pi-González (Spanish language, 2003–2006)
- Don Poier (1981)
- Alex Rivera (Spanish language, 2007–2023)
- Billy Sample (1992)
- Joe Simpson (1987–1991)
- Dave Sims (2007–2024)
- Wes Stock (1982–1983)
- Dan Wilson (2012–2024)
- Ken Wilson (1977–1982, 2011–2012)

== Radio broadcasts ==
Since 2009, and from 1985–2002 the Mariners' flagship radio station is KIRO 710 AM. Former flagship stations include KOMO 1000 AM (2003–2008) and KVI 570 AM (1977–1984).

=== Radio Broadcasters by Year ===
==== 2020s ====
Year	Flagship stations	Play-by-Play	Color Commentary / Some Play-by-Play
2027	KIRO	Gary Hill Jr.	Gary Hill Jr. Shannon Drayer; Ryan Rowland-Smith; Aaron Goldsmith
2026	KIRO	Rick Rizzs; Gary Hill Jr.	Gary Hill Jr. Shannon Drayer; Ryan Rowland-Smith; Aaron Goldsmith
2025	KIRO	Rick Rizzs	Gary Hill Jr. Shannon Drayer; Ryan Rowland-Smith; Aaron Goldsmith
2024	KIRO	Rick Rizzs	Aaron Goldsmith; Dave Sims; Gary Hill Jr.
2023	KIRO	Rick Rizzs	Aaron Goldsmith; Dave Sims; Gary Hill Jr.
2022	KIRO	Rick Rizzs	Aaron Goldsmith; Dave Sims; Gary Hill Jr.
2021	KIRO	Rick Rizzs	Aaron Goldsmith; Dave Sims
2020	KIRO	Rick Rizzs	Aaron Goldsmith; Dave Sims

==== 2000s & 2010s ====
Year	Flagship stations	Play-by-Play	Color Commentary / Some Play-by-Play
2019	KIRO	Rick Rizzs	Aaron Goldsmith; Dave Sims
2018	KIRO	Rick Rizzs	Aaron Goldsmith
2017	KIRO	Rick Rizzs	Aaron Goldsmith
2016	KIRO	Rick Rizzs	Aaron Goldsmith
2015	KIRO	Rick Rizzs	Aaron Goldsmith
2014	KIRO	Rick Rizzs	Aaron Goldsmith
2013	KIRO	Rick Rizzs	Aaron Goldsmith
2012	KIRO	Rick Rizzs	Ken Wilson; Ken Levine; Ron Fairly; Dave Henderson; Dave Valle; Dan Wilson
2011	KIRO	Rick Rizzs	Ken Wilson; Ken Levine; Ron Fairly; Dave Henderson; Dave Valle; Dan Wilson
2010	KIRO	Dave Niehaus	Rick Rizzs; Dave Sims
2009	KIRO	Dave Niehaus	Rick Rizzs; Dave Sims
2008	KOMO	Dave Niehaus	Rick Rizzs; Dave Sims
2007	KOMO	Dave Niehaus	Rick Rizzs; Dave Sims
2006	KOMO	Dave Niehaus	Rick Rizzs; Dave Henderson; Ron Fairly; Dave Valle
2005	KOMO	Dave Niehaus	Rick Rizzs; Dave Henderson; Ron Fairly; Dave Valle
2004	KOMO	Dave Niehaus	Rick Rizzs
2003	KOMO	Dave Niehaus	Rick Rizzs
2002	KIRO	Dave Niehaus	Rick Rizzs; Dave Henderson; Ron Fairly; Dave Valle
2001	KIRO	Dave Niehaus	Rick Rizzs; Dave Henderson; Ron Fairly; Dave Valle
2000	KIRO	Dave Niehaus	Rick Rizzs; Dave Henderson; Ron Fairly; Dave Valle

== Television broadcasts ==
- Mariners.TV (2026–present)
- Root Sports Northwest (formerly called Northwest Cable Sports, Prime Sports Northwest, & Fox Sports Northwest; 1993–2025)
- KSTW 11 (independent, formerly The CW & UPN; 1981–1985, 1989–1992, 2001–2007)
- KIRO 7 (CBS, formerly UPN; 1986–1988, 1990–1991, 1995–2000)
- KING 5 (NBC; 1977–1980, 2026–present)

== See also ==
- List of current Major League Baseball broadcasters
