= Bally Sports San Diego =

American regional sports network

- Country: United States
- Broadcast area: San Diego County; Imperial County; Palm Springs Area; Las Vegas Valley; Southern Arizona; Hawaii; Nationwide (via satellite)
- Network: Bally Sports
- Headquarters: San Diego, California

Programming
- Language(s): English; Spanish (via SAP)
- Picture format: 720p (HDTV); 480i (SDTV)

Ownership
- Owner: Diamond Sports Group (Sinclair Broadcast Group and Entertainment Studios)
- Sister channels: Bally Sports SoCal; Bally Sports West

History
- Launched: March 17, 2012
- Closed: April 2024
- Replaced by: MLB Network (padres games only)
- Former names: Fox Sports San Diego (2012–2021)

Links
- Website: www.ballysports.com/san-diego/

Bally Sports San Diego was an American regional sports network owned as a joint venture between Diamond Sports Group (itself a 50-50 joint venture between the Sinclair Broadcast Group and Entertainment Studios), and operated as an affiliate of Bally Sports. Prior to the team parting ways with the network in 2023, the San Diego Padres owned a 20% stake. It was launched on March 17, 2012. The network was liquidated in April 2024.

The channel broadcast local coverage of sports events within the San Diego market. Bally Sports San Diego was available on cable providers throughout San Diego County as well as Imperial County, Palm Springs Area, Las Vegas Valley, Southern Arizona and Hawaii; it is also available nationwide on satellite via DirecTV. Within the San Diego market, Cox Communications and Spectrum provided an alternate Spanish play-by-play feed during Padres games via a second audio program feed from the team's Spanish radio network.

== History ==
The network was established after Fox Sports Networks reached a 20-year broadcast agreement for the regional cable television rights to carry games from the San Diego Padres of Major League Baseball, displacing previous rights holder 4SD, a local cable channel owned by Cox Communications. Henry S. Ford, an executive who previously ran operations at Fox's regional sports networks in Detroit and Ohio, was appointed as president and general manager of Fox Sports San Diego.

Fox Sports San Diego launched on March 17, 2012, with a San Diego Padres spring training game against the Kansas City Royals. The network started operations with a minimal presence and no dedicated editing facilities or studio; during its first season, Padres game broadcasts were produced from a high-definition production truck inherited from 4SD. Pre-game and post-game shows were also produced from the same truck, and broadcast from a semi-permanent stage in the "Park at the Park" area of Petco Park, using a set inspired by a similar staging used by Fox for major sports events televised nationally. Resources have been shared with other FSN outlets; editing facilities were initially based out of Los Angeles, and master control is co-located alongside Fox's other regional sports networks at a facility near Houston, Texas.

On December 14, 2017, as part of a merger between both companies, the Walt Disney Company announced plans to acquire all 22 regional Fox Sports networks from 21st Century Fox, including the company's 80% stake in Fox Sports San Diego. However, on June 27, 2018, the Justice Department ordered their divestment under antitrust grounds, citing Disney's ownership of ESPN. On May 3, 2019, Sinclair Broadcast Group and Entertainment Studios (through their joint venture, Diamond Holdings) bought Fox Sports Networks from the Walt Disney Company for $10.6 billion. The deal closed on August 22, 2019. On November 17, 2020, Sinclair announced an agreement with casino operator Bally's Corporation to serve as a new naming rights partner for the FSN channels. Sinclair announced the new Bally Sports branding for the channels on January 27, 2021. On March 31, 2021, coinciding with the 2021 Major League Baseball season, Fox Sports San Diego was rebranded as Bally Sports San Diego, resulting in 18 other Regional Sports Networks renamed Bally Sports in their respective regions.

=== Bankruptcy ===
On February 15, 2023, Diamond Sports Group, the owner of Bally Sports San Diego, failed to make a $140 million interest payment, instead opting for a 30-day grace period to make the payment. On March 14, 2023, Diamond Sports Group filed for Chapter 11 bankruptcy protection.

After filing for bankruptcy, Diamond Sports missed a payment to the Padres in mid-March and entered a grace period. Diamond Sports eventually made the payment on March 29. In mid-May, Diamond Sports missed a second payment to the Padres and once again entered a grace period. On May 30, Diamond let the grace period expire, saying it had "decided not to provide additional funding to the San Diego RSN that would enable it to make the rights payment to the San Diego Padres during the grace period." Because Bally Sports San Diego is a joint venture between the Padres and Diamond, it is technically not in bankruptcy. Therefore, this missed payment did not have the same bankruptcy protections that Diamond's other missed payments had. As a result, the Padres May 30 game at the Miami Marlins would be the team's last broadcast on Bally Sports San Diego, marking the first time since their bankruptcy filing that Diamond's local rights to a Major League Baseball team reverted to MLB and the affected team, while leaving the future of the network in doubt. MLB subsequently took over production of Padres broadcasts, with the games being made available on select cable channels, including YurView California, and MLB.TV within the Bally Sports San Diego footprint.

The network was liquidated in April 2024, following a settlement with the Padres.

== Programming ==
=== Professional ===
The channel airs professional sports teams from the neighboring Los Angeles-Orange County market, namely the NBA's Los Angeles Clippers, and the NHL's Anaheim Ducks & Los Angeles Kings, simulcasting those televised games by its sister networks Bally Sports SoCal and Bally Sports West (blacked out in Imperial County). Previously, Bally Sports San Diego also aired Arizona Coyotes games in Imperial County, simulcasting from its now defunct sister channel Bally Sports Arizona. Until the team folded in 2014, the network also carried simulcasts of MLS's Chivas USA games from Prime Ticket for the 2012 MLS Season.The channel also aired telecasts of the AHL's San Diego Gulls

=== Liga MX ===
In May 2018, Fox Sports acquired the English-language rights to broadcast the home matches of Liga MX clubs C.F. Monterrey and Club Tijuana across the Fox Sports family of networks, the latter being located in neighboring Tijuana, Baja California, Mexico as well as having an established fan base in the San Diego area. The first match under this contract aired on July 21, 2018, with a match between Tijuana and Guadalajara which was also simulcast nationally on FS1 as well as other nearby Fox Sports regional networks. Bally Sports San Diego does not currently broadcast LigaMX matches.

=== Former programming ===
==== San Diego Padres ====
The network was created as a result of the Padres and Fox Sports signing a 20-year broadcast deal, in which Fox would pay $28 million for rights in the first year and would likely escalate topping out at a potential $75 million in the final year of the contract. The team employs both the radio and television play-by-play teams itself, thus Don Orsillo and Mark Grant remained the team's announcers intact at the network's launch, with Tony Gwynn Jr. likewise seamlessly transitioning from Bally Sports after the termination of their deal with the Padres.

== Notable on-air staff ==
=== Current ===
- Andy Ashby – Former Padres Live guest analyst
- Steve Finley – Former Padres Live guest analyst
- Nick Hardwick - radio host for Fox Sports Radio station KLSD (1360 AM)
- Steve Hartman – radio host for Fox Sports Radio station KLSD (1360 AM)
- Annie Heilbrunn – Former backup Padres sideline reporter; former Padres Weekly host (2012) and backup Padres Social Hour host (2014 to 2015)
- Clay Hensley – Former Padres Live guest analyst
- Trevor Hoffman – Former Padres Live guest analyst
- Mark Loretta – Former Padres Live guest analyst
- Judson Richards - radio host for Fox Sports Radio station KLSD (1360 AM)

=== Former ===
- Jesse Agler – backup Padres play-by-play announcer; currently is the Padres play-by-play announcer for Padres Radio station 97.3 The Fan and former Padres Social Hour host (2014 to 2015)
- Julie Alexandria – Padres sideline reporter (2016)
- Kris Budden – Padres sideline reporter (2014 to 2015; now with ESPN)
- Kelly Crull – Padres Weekly host and backup Padres sideline reporter (2013; now anchor/reporter for Bally Sports South and Bally Sports Southeast)
- Dick Enberg – Padres play-by-play announcer and Cup of Coffee host (2012 to 2016; deceased)
- Mark Grant – Padres color commentator
- Tony Gwynn – Padres color commentator (2012 to 2013; deceased)
- Tony Gwynn Jr. – Padres Live guest analyst and Padres POV host
- Mike Janela – Padres Social Hour host (2016)
- Lisa Lane – Padres POV host and backup Padres sideline reporter (2018)
- Michelle Margaux – Padres POV host and backup Padres sideline reporter (2016 to 2017, later Tampa Bay Rays reporter for Fox Sports Sun, now Houston Astros reporter on Space City Home Network)
- Andy Masur – backup Padres play-by-play announcer (2012; now radio host on WGN in Chicago)
- Britt McHenry – Padres sideline reporter (2012; last for ESPN)
- Laura McKeeman – Padres sideline reporter, backup Padres Live host, and #SDLive co-host (2013; now host/reporter for ESPN)
- Megan Olivi – Padres POV host and Padres social media correspondent (2013; now ESPN and UFC host/correspondent/reporter)
- Don Orsillo – Padres play-by-play announcer
- Kate Osborne – Padres POV host and backup Padres sideline reporter (2014)
- Leila Rahimi – Padres sideline reporter (2012; later host/anchor/reporter for NBC Sports Chicago, now sports anchor for WMAQ-TV, also in Chicago)
- Bob Scanlan – Padres sideline reporter
- Ally Sturm – Padres POV host and backup Padres sideline reporter (2015)
- Mark Sweeney – Former Padres Live analyst and backup Padres color commentator
- Mike Pomeranz – Inside San Diego Sports and former Padres Live host
- Annie Heilbrunn – Former backup Padres sideline reporter; former Padres Weekly host (2012) and backup Padres Social Hour host (2014 to 2015)

== Availability ==
Cox Communications and DirecTV have carried the channel since its launch. Initially, DirecTV only carried Fox Sports San Diego as a part-time feed for live game broadcasts; it later added the dedicated, 24-hour feed on April 1, 2013. AT&T U-verse reached a carriage deal in September 2012, on the final day of the Padres regular season. Dish Network reached an agreement to carry Fox Sports San Diego on February 7, 2013, adding the channel to its lineup two months later on April 1.

Of the five major television providers serving the San Diego region, Time Warner Cable (which is now known as Spectrum that serves roughly 22% of the market) was a notable holdout in carrying the network on launch; by contrast, during the Padres' later tenure with the channel, TWC did carry 4SD (which was also, by contrast, not offered by U-verse or on satellite providers, leading to complaints filed by AT&T to the Federal Communications Commission that eventually led to the removal of the "terrestrial loophole" in 2010). In March 2013, the San Diego City Council held a hearing approving a symbolic resolution pressuring Fox and Time Warner Cable to reach a deal by the opening of the 2013 season, citing "the importance of professional baseball in San Diego." On February 10, 2014, Fox announced that they had finally reached an agreement with TWC to carry Fox Sports San Diego; the provider began carrying the channel on March 30, 2014, in time for the 2014 season.

In 2015, Frontier FiOS agreed to carry Fox Sports San Diego for the Coachella Valley in time for the 2015 season.

The only cable TV providers that haven't carried Bally Sports San Diego since its launch in 2012 are CenturyLink Prism TV in the Las Vegas Valley and Hawaiian Telcom in Hawaii.
