= Wes Stock =

American baseball player and coach (born 1934)

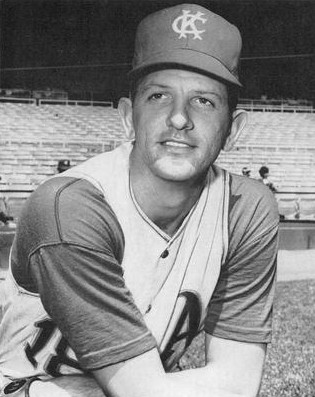
- Pitcher
- Born: April 10, 1934 (age 92); Longview, Washington, U.S.
- Batted: Right Threw: Right

MLB debut
- April 19, 1959, for the Baltimore Orioles

Last MLB appearance
- May 7, 1967, for the Kansas City Athletics

MLB statistics
- Win–loss record: 27–13
- Earned run average: 3.60
- Strikeouts: 365
- Stats at Baseball Reference

Teams
- Baltimore Orioles (1959–1964); Kansas City Athletics (1964–1967)

Career highlights and awards
- 2× World Series champion (1973, 1974)

Wesley Gay Stock (born April 10, 1934) is an American former Major League Baseball pitcher, pitching coach and television commentator. He appeared in 321 games pitched (all but three in relief) between 1959 and 1967 with the Baltimore Orioles and Kansas City Athletics. Stock threw and batted right-handed; he was listed as 6 feet 2 inches (1.88 m) tall and 190 pounds (86 kg).

== Biography ==
Stock attended Shelton High School then Washington State University (then College), where he was initiated into the Phi Kappa Tau fraternity. He played college baseball for the Cougars from 1954 to 1955. He signed with the Orioles in 1956 and spent 1957–1958 performing military service. His initial trial with Baltimore in April 1959 came after only one season of minor league baseball in the Class C Northern League. He earned his first MLB save on April 25 but was optioned to the minors in May. He would pitch in every subsequent season through 1967.

On June 15, 1964, the Orioles traded Stock to the Kansas City Athletics for Charley Lau.

Over all or parts of nine MLB seasons, Stock won 27 of 40 decisions (a winning percentage of .675) with 365 strikeouts and 22 saves in 517 1/3 innings pitched.

Although a weak hitter in his major league career, posting only a .051 batting average (3-for-59), he was better than average defensively. He recorded a .980 fielding percentage with only three errors in 148 total chances, which was 25 points higher than the league average during his career.

After his final appearance on the mound, Stock became a pitching coach for the Athletics in both Kansas City (from July 13, 1967, through the end of that season) and Oakland (1973–1976; 1984–1986), the Milwaukee Brewers (1970–1972), and the Seattle Mariners (1977–1981). He was a coach on the 1975 American League All-Star team and on the 1973–1974 World Series champion A's. In his two years as the minor league pitching coordinator for the New York Mets (1968–1969), working under his former teammate Whitey Herzog, he helped develop mound talent that would contribute to the Mets' 1969 world championship. In addition to coaching, Stock was one of the Mariners' television broadcasters in 1982 and 1983.

== See also ==
- List of Major League Baseball players
- List of Seattle Mariners broadcasters
- Baltimore Orioles
- Kansas City Athletics
- Oakland Athletics

Preceded by Cot Deal; Bill Posedel; Ron Schueler	Kansas City and Oakland Athletics pitching coach 1967; 1973–1976; 1984–1986	Succeeded by Bill Posedel; Lee Stange; Dave Duncan
Preceded by Sal Maglie (Seattle Pilots)	Milwaukee Brewers pitching coach 1970–1972	Succeeded by Bob Shaw
Preceded by Franchise established	Seattle Mariners pitching coach 1977–1981	Succeeded by Dave Duncan
