= Bill Posedel =

American baseball player (1906-1989)

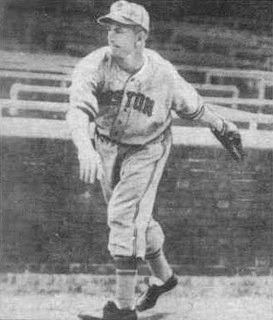
- Pitcher
- Born: August 2, 1906; San Francisco, California, U.S.
- Died: November 28, 1989 (aged 83); Livermore, California, U.S.
- Batted: Right Threw: Right

MLB debut
- April 23, 1938, for the Brooklyn Dodgers

Last MLB appearance
- September 13, 1946, for the Boston Braves

MLB statistics
- Win–loss record: 41–43
- Earned run average: 4.56
- Strikeouts: 227
- Stats at Baseball Reference

Teams
- Brooklyn Dodgers (1938); Boston Bees / Braves (1939–1941, 1946)

William John Posedel (August 2, 1906 – November 28, 1989), nicknamed "Barnacle Bill", was an American right-handed pitcher in Major League Baseball who played for the Brooklyn Dodgers and Boston Bees/Braves in 1938–1941 and in 1946.

Posedel was born in San Francisco, California. He began his professional baseball career in 1929, pitching for the Portland Beavers of the Pacific Coast League. He would spend all or parts of six seasons pitching for Portland, and twice (in 1936 and 1937) win 20-plus games for the Beavers. Posedel's extended service in the PCL resulted in his late Major League debut, at age 31, for the 1938 Dodgers.

In his finest MLB campaign, 1939 with the Boston "Bees" (then the Braves' official nickname), Posedel won 15 of 28 decisions, including five shutouts, for a seventh-place team that claimed only 63 victories all season. All told, Posedel allowed 747 hits and 248 bases on balls in 679 1/3 innings of work in the Majors. He struck out 227.

After his playing career, Posedel was a pitching coach for the Pittsburgh Pirates (1949–1953), St. Louis Cardinals (1954–1957), Philadelphia Phillies (1958), San Francisco Giants (1959–1960), Oakland Athletics (1968–1972) and San Diego Padres (1974). He also worked as a scout for the Pirates (1948), Cleveland Indians (1961) and Kansas City Athletics (1962–1967), and managed the 1957 Beavers from April 29 through the end of the season.

Posedel served in the United States Navy from 1925 to 1929 and again during World War II, from 1942 to 1945. He died in Livermore, California, at age 83.

== See also ==
- List of St. Louis Cardinals coaches

Preceded by Bill Burwell	Pittsburgh Pirates pitching coach 1949–1953	Succeeded by n/a
Preceded by n/a	St. Louis Cardinals pitching coach 1956–1957	Succeeded by Al Hollingsworth
Preceded by Frank Carswell	Portland Beavers manager 1957; April 29 – September 15	Succeeded by Tommy Heath
Preceded by Whit Wyatt	Philadelphia Phillies pitching coach 1958	Succeeded by Tom Ferrick
Preceded by n/a	San Francisco Giants pitching coach 1959–1960	Succeeded by Larry Jansen
Preceded by Wes Stock; 1967 Kansas City Athletics	Oakland Athletics pitching coach 1968–1972	Succeeded by Wes Stock
Preceded by Johnny Podres	San Diego Padres pitching coach 1974	Succeeded by Tom Morgan
