= Frontier Fiber =

Internet utility in the United States

Frontier Logo

Frontier Fiber (formerly known as Frontier FiOS) is a bundled Internet access, telephone, and (until 2021) television service provided by Frontier Communications that operates over a fiber-optic network within the United States.

== History ==
In May 2009, Frontier announced that it would acquire Verizon's 4.8 million landlines leased to residential and small business customers in Arizona, Idaho, Illinois, Indiana, Michigan, Nevada, North Carolina, Ohio, Oregon, South Carolina, Washington, West Virginia, and Wisconsin, for $8.6 billion. In addition to the purchase of copper lines, Frontier also acquired the fiber-optic system built by Verizon in Fort Wayne, around Portland, and in some eastern suburbs of Seattle. These operations would continue to operate under the FiOS branding used by Verizon.

Frontier initially stated that it had no plans for changes after the transition. However, the company later attempted to institute a $500 installation fee for new television subscribers, backed out of franchise agreements in some cities in Oregon, and increased rates by 50% in Indiana. Frontier later retracted the rate increases and installation fee but has not reclaimed franchises in the cities that it relinquished and not before losing FiOS TV subscribers.

On February 5, 2015, Frontier announced that it would also acquire Verizon's wireline assets in California, Florida and Texas for $10.5 billion. The transition took effect April 1, 2016; technical issues with the integration resulted in a disruption of service for many FiOS users in the markets, which continued for some in the weeks that followed. In May 2016, California assemblyman Mike Gatto announced a hearing over the matter, stating that "there has been an alarming rate of telephone and Internet outages in Southern California and consumers are frustrated with the lack of a solution to this months-long ordeal".

During the hearing, Frontier West president Melinda White stated that most of the issues were caused by incomplete customer data provided by Verizon for importation into its systems. White stated that less than 1 percent of its customers were affected, and that it would provide service credits to affected subscribers while it finished addressing the issues. Republican assemblyman Jim Patterson accused the California Public Utilities Commission (CPUC) of not placing enough oversight on the transition, deeming it a "failure of the fundamental role and responsibility" of the commission.

In May 2020, Frontier completed a sale of its assets in the Pacific Northwest to Ziply Fiber including the fiber-optic systems that it had acquired from Verizon in Washington and Oregon.

In late 2020, Frontier dropped the FiOS branding, renaming the service Frontier FiberOptic.

In 2021, Frontier announces plans to discontinue its in-house TV services and partnered with YouTube TV, freeing up its bandwidth for internet and phone. Frontier customers were paying the two services separately until March 27, 2023 when the companies offered integrated billing. While Frontier's TV service is still active, it has not accepted new customers since the company's announcement.
