= Prism TV =

American IPTV service

- Company type: Subsidiary/limited liability company
- Industry: Pay television
- Founded: January 5, 2011
- Founder: Lumen Technologies
- Area served: United States
- Owner: Lumen Technologies
- Website: www.centurylink.com/prismtv/

Prism TV is an American IPTV service owned by Lumen Technologies. It is based on the same technology as the U-verse service deployed by AT&T.

== History ==
Around the time that Sprint Nextel spun off their landline division to form Embarq, Verizon, and AT&T began work on their own IPTV services to compete with the local cable companies. Embarq was no different, and had started work on a similar service called Embarq TV. Details were scarce, but the service was rumored to have been an IPTV fiber-to-the-node service similar to AT&T's U-verse. The service was going through beta testing when CenturyTel agreed to purchase Embarq to form CenturyLink in 2009.

CenturyLink (still known as CenturyTel) began rolling out what was to eventually be known as Prism TV in October 2009 in Jefferson City, Missouri. It adopted the Prism TV name in 2011, based on the Embarq TV infrastructure.

Over time, CenturyLink began rolling out Prism TV in markets as they were upgraded from the old copper-based services to fiber-optic communication, eventually offering the service in markets in Arizona, Colorado, Florida, Iowa, Minnesota, Missouri, Nebraska, Nevada, North Carolina, Oregon, Washington, and Wisconsin.

Other markets were to follow once their lines were upgraded to be able to carry Prism TV. In the interim, markets that did not offer Prism TV had a triple play option through CenturyLink with DirecTV. Some CenturyLink customers also had Dish Network as their TV provider through CenturyLink under a grandfather clause, as Dish was the legacy provider through CenturyTel and Embarq; CenturyLink switched to DirecTV as part of its acquisition of Qwest, who had partnered with DirecTV.

In 2018, CenturyLink stopped offering Prism TV to new customers. Instead, CenturyLink it began promoting DirecTV for new customers.

In late 2020, CenturyLink began the process of discontinuing Prism TV completely starting in Minnesota and Nevada. As of March 2021, several other markets have stopped offering the service to all customers including Arizona, Colorado, Washington, and parts of Florida.

== Reception ==
Reception for Prism TV has been generally positive, with many observers feeling that giving consumers the option in areas where they might have been stuck with the local cable company if they weren't able to receive satellite television (due to either technical reasons or not being allowed through their landlords if they rent their homes) combined with cord-cutting would ultimately help push pay TV prices lower.

While CenturyLink has been slower to roll out Prism TV compared to Verizon Fios and AT&T U-verse, it has gotten praise from some consumer advocate groups that they are at least putting forth the effort to upgrade their landlines and offer the service. Verizon, and to a lesser extent, AT&T, have both received criticism for all but abandoning their landline infrastructure to focus more on their wireless divisions, something CenturyLink doesn't offer on its own. (CenturyLink does offer bundling services for Verizon Wireless.) Verizon has in fact faced lawsuits from the city governments in New York City and Pittsburgh (both of which offer CenturyLink in parts of their suburban areas, though neither currently offer Prism TV) for failure to deploy Fios throughout their respective cities. While AT&T has mostly deployed U-verse throughout its 21-state landline territory and has maintained its landlines, they have shown a lack of commitment on U-verse and plan on merging U-verse into DirecTV, which AT&T acquired in 2015.

== See also ==
- Fiber-optic communication
- IPTV
