= Ryan Rowland-Smith =

Australian baseball player (born 1983)

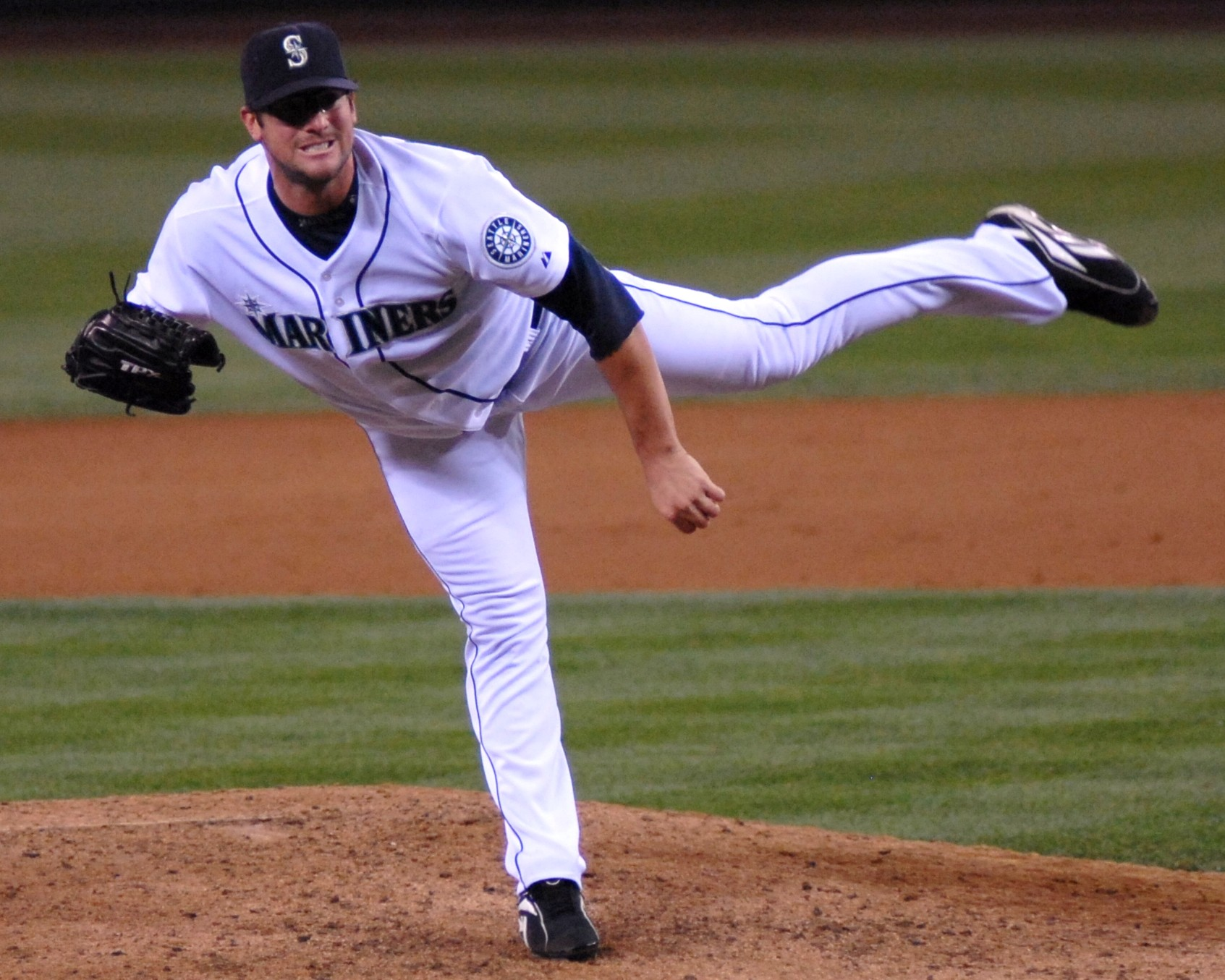
- Rowland-Smith with the Seattle Mariners
- Pitcher
- Born: 26 January 1983 (age 43); Sydney, Australia
- Batted: Left Threw: Left

Professional debut
- MLB: 22 June, 2007, for the Seattle Mariners
- CPBL: 26 March, 2015, for the EDA Rhinos

Last appearance
- MLB: 14 April, 2014, for the Arizona Diamondbacks
- CPBL: 15 May, 2015, for the EDA Rhinos

MLB statistics
- Win–loss record: 12–17
- Earned run average: 4.57
- Strikeouts: 229

CPBL statistics
- Win–loss record: 1–4
- Earned run average: 4.70
- Strikeouts: 45
- Stats at Baseball Reference

Teams
- Seattle Mariners (2007–2010); Arizona Diamondbacks (2014); EDA Rhinos (2015)
Medals
Men's baseball
Representing Australia
Olympics
Silver medal – second place	Athens 2004	Team competition

Ryan Benjamin Rowland-Smith (born 26 January 1983) is an Australian former professional baseball pitcher and current television broadcaster for the Seattle Mariners. He debuted in Major League Baseball (MLB) for the Mariners in 2007 and pitched with the team through 2010. He briefly pitched for the Arizona Diamondbacks in 2014. Rowland-Smith also represented Australia in the 2004 Summer Olympics and three World Baseball Classic tournaments.

Born in Sydney, Rowland-Smith grew up watching MLB games on videocassette. Signed out of high school by the Mariners, he spent the next several years pitching for their minor league teams. Promoted to Seattle for the first time in June 2007, he struck out the first batter he faced, former Mariners' star Ken Griffey Jr. Rowland-Smith began 2008 as a relief pitcher for the Mariners but converted into a starting pitcher in August, pitching in the starting rotation the rest of the year. After his first start in 2009, he went on the disabled list with triceps tendinitis. Rejoining the Mariners in July, he completed the eighth inning in three of his remaining starts for Seattle. In 2010, he made a career-high 20 starts for the Mariners but posted a 1–10 record and a 6.75 earned run average (ERA). Seattle did not offer him a contract after the season.

Over the next three seasons, Rowland-Smith pitched in the minor leagues for several teams. In 2014, he began the season with the Arizona Diamondbacks, much to his excitement as the Diamondbacks were opening the 2014 season in Australia. His time with the Diamondbacks did not last long, as the team designated him for assignment on 18 April. Rowland-Smith pitched for some minor league teams the remainder of the year, then joined the EDA Rhinos of the Chinese Professional Baseball League in 2015. He pitched for the Brisbane Bandits of the Australian Baseball League in January 2017, then retired after the 2017 World Baseball Classic.

== Early life ==
Rowland-Smith was born 26 January 1983, in Sydney, Australia. His father is Australian celebrity trainer Rob Rowland-Smith, known as "The Sandhill Warrior," and his mother is a retired high school physical education teacher. Ryan was their third child and had two older sisters. His parents divorced when Ryan was three, and Rowland-Smith grew up with his mother and sisters in Newcastle, New South Wales. He was a baseball fan from childhood, primarily watching video cassettes of the 1992 and 1993 World Series because Major League Baseball was not televised in Australia at the time. Rowland-Smith started playing baseball himself at the age of 12. He graduated from Newcastle High School in December 2000. The Seattle Mariners, one of the only Major League Baseball (MLB) teams that scouted Australia at the time, signed Rowland-Smith as a free agent on 19 November 2000. "I signed it before the ink dried," Rowland-Smith said of his contract. "It was the only opportunity I was going to get."

== Career ==
=== 2001–04 seasons ===
Rowland-Smith began his pro career in 2001 with the Rookie level Arizona League Mariners. In 17 relief appearances, he allowed just one home run in 33 1/3 innings pitched. He split the 2002 season between the Single-A Wisconsin Timber Rattlers and the Short Season-A Everett AquaSox. With Wisconsin to begin the season, he appeared in 12 games (eight starts), posting a 1–2 record and a 6.75 earned run average (ERA). In the middle of the season, he was demoted to Everett. He appeared in 18 games (six starts) with Everett, posting a 4–1 record, a 2.77 ERA, 58 strikeouts, and 58 hits allowed in 61 2/3 innings pitched.

In 2003, Rowland-Smith pitched for Wisconsin again, appearing in 13 games. He had a 3–0 record, a 1.11 ERA, and 37 strikeouts in 32 1/3 innings. During the year, he also pitched for the Class-A Advanced Inland Empire 66ers. In 15 games with the 66ers, he lost one game, posted a 3.20 ERA, struck out 15, and allowed 12 hits over 19 2/3 innings pitched. He had a 1.90 ERA and 52 strikeouts combined between Wisconsin and Inland Empire. Rowland-Smith played the entire 2004 season with Inland Empire, appearing in 29 games. He split the season between the bullpen and the starting rotation, going 5–3 with a 3.79 ERA as a starter. He struck out 119 batters in 99 2/3 innings and held opponents to a .276 batting average.

=== 2005 season ===
The Minnesota Twins selected Rowland-Smith in the major league phase of the 2004 Rule 5 draft. On 4 March, the Twins signed him to a one-year contract. He spent most of 2005 spring training with the Twins. Ultimately, Minnesota decided not to keep him on the roster all season, and he was returned to Seattle on 25 March. He spent the season with the Double-A San Antonio Missions, setting a career high with 122 innings pitched. In 33 games (17 starts), he had a 6–7 record, a 4.35 ERA, 102 strikeouts, and 133 hits allowed.

=== 2006 season ===
Rowland-Smith split the 2006 season with Inland Empire and San Antonio. With the 66ers, he gave up seven runs (four earned) in 6 1/3 innings pitched over seven games. He spent a greater portion of the season with the Missions. On 25 August, he struck out a season-high seven batters in 4 1/3 innings. In 23 games (one start) for the Missions, he had a 1–3 record, a 2.83 ERA, 48 strikeouts, and 38 hits allowed in 41 1/3 innings. Following the regular season, he played with the Peoria Javelinas in the Arizona Fall League.

=== 2007 season ===
For the first time in 2007, Rowland-Smith pitched for the Triple-A Tacoma Rainiers of the Pacific Coast League (PCL). He made 25 relief appearances for the team, posting a 3–4 record, a 3.67 ERA, 50 strikeouts, and 35 hits allowed in 41 2/3 innings before getting promoted to the Mariners in June. Rowland-Smith made his major league debut for the Mariners on 22 June, against the Cincinnati Reds in a game notable for being the return of longtime Mariners star Ken Griffey Jr. to Safeco Field. Griffey was the first batter Rowland-Smith faced; Rowland-Smith struck the future Hall of Famer out, proceeding to pitch 1 1/3 scoreless innings in a blowout 16–1 Mariners loss. He did not allow a run in 10 2/3 consecutive innings spanning five games from 22 to 31 August. In the first game of that stretch, he struck out six batters in four scoreless innings of relief in an 8–4 loss to the Twins. He earned his first career win 13 September against the Tampa Bay Devil Rays, pitching 2 1/3 scoreless innings in a game the Mariners trailed 7–1 but rallied to win 8–7. In his first year with Seattle, he struck out 42 batters in 38 1/3 innings, posting a 1–0 record and limiting opposing batters to 39 hits. After the season, he pitched for Lara in the Venezuelan Winter League. Rowland-Smith said about his offseason:

I'd like to get four or five starts [in Venezuela], go back to Australia and try to get in shape for next season. I don't know what's going to happen after that, but they told me they want me down there, starting. I just wanted to get up here and show I could throw strikes at this level. Now that I've been here for a while, I've got so much more confidence.

— Ryan Rowland-Smith, The Seattle Times: September 18, 2007.

=== 2008 season ===
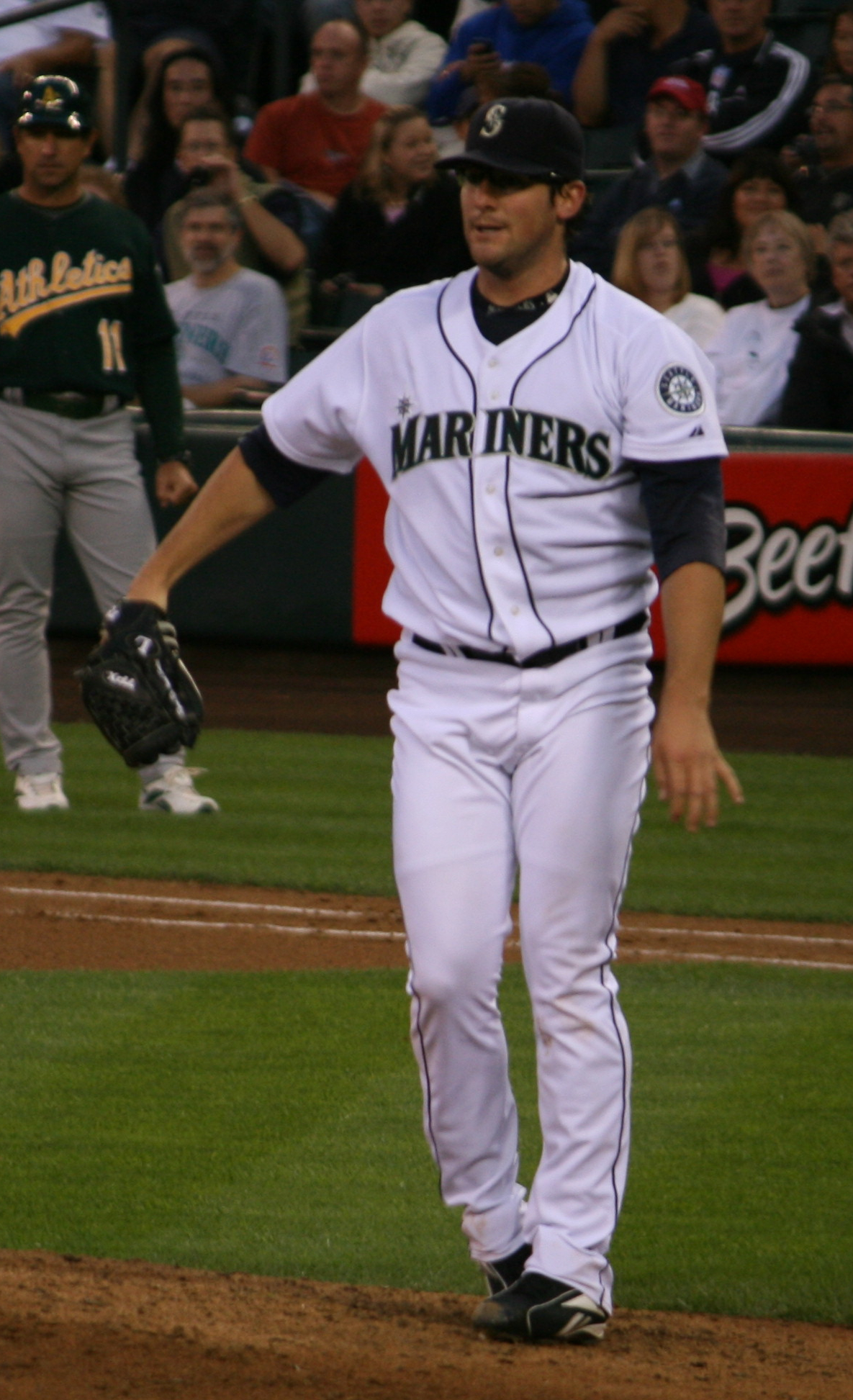
Rowland-Smith pitching against the Oakland Athletics.

Rowland-Smith began the season exclusively as a reliever, making 32 relief appearances before making two starts prior to the All-Star break. He collected his first save on 8 April against the Tampa Bay Rays in Seattle's 6–5 win, tossing 1 2/3 innings and retiring all five batters he faced while protecting one-run lead. His first major league start came 1 July against the Toronto Blue Jays; Rowland-Smith threw three scoreless innings before getting replaced by Roy Corcoran with two outs in the fourth inning after allowing three runs that inning. The Mariners rallied to win 7–6. He made three more relief appearances before being optioned to Tacoma on 20 July to be converted to a starting pitcher. He went 2–0 with a 2.89 ERA in three starts for the Rainiers, holding opponents to a .185 batting average before joining Seattle's rotation on 9 August. From 21 August until the end of the season, he posted a 2.56 ERA. Against the Oakland Athletics on 21 August, he took the loss but held the team to four hits in seven innings, only allowing a solo home run to Emil Brown. He faced Oakland again in his final start of the year on 27 September, allowing three runs in 6 2/3 innings this time but picking up the win in a 7–3 victory. In 47 games (12 starts) with the Mariners in 2008, he had a 5–3 record, a 3.42 ERA, 77 strikeouts, and 114 hits allowed in 118 1/3 innings.

=== 2009 season ===
In a 2009 spring training game against the Colorado Rockies, Rowland-Smith hit two singles in two at bats. This was his first time batting against a live pitcher since he was 17 years old. He used teammate Jeff Clement's bat.

At the beginning of the season, Rowland-Smith started one game before being placed on the disabled list with triceps tendinitis. He was sent to Tacoma for rehab starts, but a dismal outing on 5 June in which he allowed 12 runs in 4 2/3 innings prompted the Mariners to option him to Tacoma. In July, he was promoted and added to the starting rotation after going 5–3 with a 4.31 ERA in 10 starts for Tacoma. He pitched seven innings in his first start back on 24 July, allowing four runs and taking the loss in a 9–0 defeat to the Cleveland Indians. Five days later, he limited the Toronto Blue Jays to two runs over seven innings and picked up his first win of the year in the Mariners' 3–2 victory. Three times in 2009, he threw a season-high eight innings, including a game on 16 September, when he limited the Chicago White Sox to one run in a 4–1 victory. Rowland-Smith made his last start of the year for the Mariners on 3 October, holding the Texas Rangers to one run over 6 2/3 innings in a 2–1 victory.

Rowland-Smith finished the season with a 5–4 record, a 3.74 ERA, 52 strikeouts, and 87 hits allowed in 96 1/3 innings over 15 games (all starts).

=== 2010 season ===
Rowland-Smith's game against the White Sox on 16 September 2009, left Christian Caple of MLB.com excited about his chances for next season:

Ryan Rowland-Smith is turning into a can't-miss starter for the Mariners...there's no reason why he can't head into [2010 spring training] as the team's No. 2 starter.

— Christian Caple, MLB.com: September 17, 2009.

In fact, Rowland-Smith started the 2010 season as the third starter in the Mariners' rotation, behind Félix Hernández and Ian Snell. He struggled to begin the season, posting a 7.62 ERA in his first eight starts while losing all four of his decisions. After the shortest start of his career on 18 May, in which he gave up seven runs in 2 2/3 innings, the Mariners moved him to the bullpen. Rowland-Smith returned to the rotation on 5 June, when Doug Fister had to miss a start because of shoulder fatigue. The Mariners lost to the Angels 11–2, but Rowland-Smith limited the Los Angeles Angels of Anaheim to one run in five innings. After that, he continued to be used as a starter. He held Cincinnati scoreless for six innings on 20 June, earning his first win of the year in a 1–0 victory. The win, however, would be his only victory of the year. On 27 July, he gave up 11 runs over five innings in an 11–0 loss to the White Sox. The Mariners left him in the game that long because they wanted to preserve their bullpen. After the game, he was placed on the disabled list with a lower back strain, which Rob Neyer of ESPN speculated was a "phantom injury" designed to get him off the roster, since the Mariners could not send him to the minor leagues without exposing him to waivers. After a rehab stint in Tacoma, he rejoined the team in September when rosters expanded.

Upon his activation from the disabled list, Rowland-Smith was mainly used out of the bullpen, except for the last game of the season, 3 October, in which he gave up two runs in five innings and had a no-decision in a 4–3 loss to the Athletics. 20 of Rowland-Smith's 27 appearances in 2010 were starts (a career-high), but only one of those was a win, as opposed to ten losses. He had a 6.75 ERA and gave up 141 hits in 109 1/3 innings.

Rowland-Smith was the Mariners' nominee for the Roberto Clemente Award, given annually to the MLB player who "best represents the game through extraordinary character, community involvement, philanthropy and positive contributions, both on and off the field." Seattle made him their candidate because of his work in hosting the Mariners Care Cystic Fibrosis Foundation golf tournament. In November 2010, the Sydney Blue Sox named Rowland-Smith as one of the players on their 35-man roster for the inaugural Australian Baseball League season, but he never pitched for them. On 2 December 2010, the Mariners non-tendered Rowland-Smith, making him a free agent.

=== 2011–2013 seasons ===
On 9 December 2010, the Houston Astros signed Rowland-Smith to a one-year, $725,000 contract. He spent most of the season with the PCL's Oklahoma City RedHawks. In 22 games (19 starts), he had a 2–10 record, a 6.19 ERA, 87 strikeouts, and 131 hits allowed in 104 2/3 innings. After the season, he became a free agent. During the offseason, he played winter ball for the Leones de Ponce of the Puerto Rican Winter League, losing three of his five starts.

The Chicago Cubs signed Rowland-Smith to a minor league contract on 2 February 2012. He spent the whole season with the Iowa Cubs of the PCL, where he was used more as a reliever (22 games) than a starter (eight games). He had a 3–6 record, a 3.94 ERA, 62 strikeouts, and 75 hits allowed in 77 2/3 innings pitched. After the season, he became a free agent.

On 24 February 2013, the Boston Red Sox signed Rowland-Smith to a minor league deal. In 37 games in relief for the Triple-A Pawtucket Red Sox, he had a 7–0 record and a 1.55 ERA. However, he suffered an appendicitis in late June, causing him to miss a month of the season and potentially a chance to return to the major leagues with Boston.

=== 2014 season ===
Rowland-Smith signed a minor league contract with the Arizona Diamondbacks prior to the 2014 season. He was excited about joining Arizona because they were opening their season with two regular-season games in March against the Los Angeles Dodgers at the Sydney Cricket Ground in Australia.

To play Major League Baseball in Australia is such a special thing...For me to be able to play MLB in my own backyard is bizarre to be honest with you. To be able to put my American life and Australian life together will be pretty special.

— Ryan Rowland-Smith, The Daily Telegraph, January 30, 2014.

While he did not pitch in the Australian series, Rowland-Smith was on the Diamondbacks roster at the beginning of the 2014 season, his first time on a major league roster since 2010 with the Mariners. He made his last appearance in the major leagues on 14 April, giving up two runs (one earned) in the final two innings of a 7–3 loss to the New York Mets. Designated for assignment on 18 April, he cleared waivers and elected to become a free agent on 21 April. In six games with the Diamondbacks, he posted a 4.91 ERA, allowing five runs (four earned) in 7 1/3 innings of work.

On 25 April, Rowland-Smith signed a minor league deal with the Toronto Blue Jays. He pitched for the Triple-A Buffalo Bisons of the International League, allowing 8 runs in just 14 innings before drawing his release on 11 June. On 28 June, he signed a minor league deal with the Cincinnati Reds. He made one start for the Triple-A Louisville Bats but was mostly used out of the bullpen, posting a 4.20 ERA in 12 games with no wins or losses. On 2 August, the Reds released him.

=== Last years ===
In 2015, Rowland-Smith left the United States, signing with the EDA Rhinos of the Chinese Professional Baseball League, located in Taiwan. He appeared in nine games with the team, posting a 1–4 record and a 4.70 ERA in 46 innings. For winter 2015–16, Rowland-Smith pitched in one game for Gigantes del Cibao of the Dominican Winter League. After not pitching in 2016, Rowland-Smith signed with the Brisbane Bandits of the Australian Baseball League in January 2017. In four starts, he won one game but had a 6.35 ERA. However, Brisbane won its second consecutive ABL championship. Rowland-Smith planned to retire after the season, once he had finished playing for Australia in the 2017 World Baseball Classic.

== International play ==
Rowland-Smith played for the Australia national team in multiple international tournaments. He pitched in the 2004 Summer Olympic games, going 2–0 with a 1.23 ERA allowing only six hits and five walks while striking out 5 in four relief appearances. He helped the team to a silver medal, losing in the championship game to Cuba, 6–2. Rowland-Smith's teammates on the Inland Empire 66ers paid close attention to the gold medal game, cheering on their teammate.

Rowland-Smith was added to Australia's roster for the 2006 World Baseball Classic (WBC). However, he was unable to pitch in the tournament because of a sore elbow. He decided not to compete in the 2009 WBC to stay in spring training with the Mariners. Rowland-Smith once again represented Australia in the 2013 WBC. The team was eliminated after losing all three of its games in the first round. He pitched twice in relief, allowing 1 run in 1 2/3 innings.

Before he retired, Rowland-Smith represented Australia one last time at the 2017 WBC. First, he pitched with the team in the qualifying tournament in February 2016, held in Australia. He hoped the tournament could spur a comeback to MLB. In Australia's second game of the qualifier (the first against South Africa), Rowland-Smith pitched three scoreless innings in relief of Warwick Saupold, allowing two hits and striking out three. Australia won all three games on home soil, defeating the Philippines and South Africa twice to advance to the main WBC tournament. "On paper, as far as rosters go, we have the best roster, we have the most depth," he said of the team during the qualifier. It was Australia's fourth-straight World Baseball Classic, but they failed to advance past the first round, going 1–2 with a win over China and losses to Japan and Cuba. In Rowland-Smith's only appearance, he served as a LOOGY, striking out Nori Aoki of Japan with the bases loaded in the top of the ninth inning.

== Post-playing career ==
Rowland-Smith became a baseball television analyst for Root Sports Northwest, appearing on the pre- and post-game shows for Seattle Mariners broadcasts starting in 2017. He is also a baseball radio analyst for ESPN710 Seattle, appearing on Mariners post-game shows. He was also an analyst for the 2023 World Baseball Classic qualification event. Rowland-Smith said that baseball and talking were the two things he enjoyed doing the most; thus, being a commentator was the perfect occupation for him. In 2024, he became an MLB Network analyst and started a podcast about baseball called The Top Step. He became a regular television color commentator for Mariners broadcasts in 2025, one of several announcers replacing Mike Blowers.

Rowland-Smith and fellow Australian ballplayer Trent Oeltjen co-founded NxtGen Baseball, a training camp for young baseball players.

== Personal life ==
Rowland-Smith's grandfather was a former New South Wales minister for sport and recreation. His older sister, Rhiannon, is a competitive surfer. While surfing is not his profession, Rowland-Smith avidly pursues it as a hobby.

Rowland-Smith was married in 2013 to American actress Amanda Aardsma, the sister of his former teammate David Aardsma. He became friends with Ken Griffey Jr., victim of his first major league strikeout, who attended Rowland-Smith's wedding in 2013.

Rowland-Smith's nickname is "Hyphen". He earned the moniker after becoming the first player in MLB history to have a hyphenated surname on the back of his jersey. During his career, he maintained his own blog to keep up with fans. He was also, in 2009, the only Mariner known to maintain a Twitter account. Rowland-Smith helped the Mariners host a forum on the use of social media in 2009.

In June 2019, Rowland-Smith appeared on the television show American Ninja Warrior in the Seattle Qualifying Round. He said of the opportunity, "I know the minute I step out to the steps, if I don’t finish it, I’ll say, ‘OK, I want another shot at this until I do finish it.’ But at the very least, I want to enjoy it and embrace it. I’ve gotten messages from people in that ninja community and it's so awesome. ... I want to get the most of that experience."
