= Kelsey Wingert =

American journalist (born 1992)

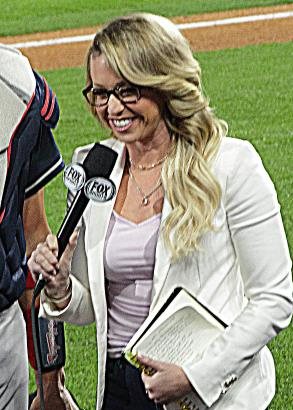
- Wingert in 2019
- Education: Louisiana State University
- Occupations: Sideline reporter, journalist
- Employer: MLB.tv

Kelsey Wingert covers the Colorado Rockies for MLB.tv during the baseball season. Prior to working for the Rockies, she reported on the Atlanta Braves and other teams covered by Bally Sports South and did studio cut-ins for NBA and NHL games as well as sideline reporting for Atlantic Coast Conference football games during the baseball offseason.

== Early life and college ==
Wingert grew up in Sugar Land, Texas. She graduated from Stephen F. Austin High School in Fort Bend County, Texas, where she played volleyball. She is a graduate of Louisiana State University class of 2014, where she played intramural volleyball and was a member of the Sigma chapter of Delta Zeta. She picked LSU because of the TV broadcast department.

== Career ==
Prior to working for Fox Sports South in 2016, she worked at KALB-TV in Alexandria, Louisiana. She suffered a broken eye socket in a game in 2018 after getting hit with a foul ball hit by Odubel Herrera of the Philadelphia Phillies, but was able to return a few days later. Wingert was not renewed for her job covering the Braves after the 2019 season. She was replaced by Kelly Crull. In 2022, she was hired by AT&T SportsNet Rocky Mountain to cover the Rockies. A month into her job with AT&T Sportsnet, she was hit in the forehead by a foul ball struck at 95 MPH.

Wingert also hosted Farm to Fame, a podcast about baseball prospects carried on Jomboy Media, together with former MLB pitcher Peter Moylan.

== Personal life ==
Less than three weeks after being hit by a foul ball, she married Casey Linch on June 4, 2022.
