= Ben Ingram =

American sports broadcaster (born 1980)

- Born: March 13, 1980 (age 46); Madison, Mississippi
- Education: Mississippi College
- Occupation: Play-by-play announcer
- Years active: 2005–present
- Employer: Dickey Broadcasting Company
- Known for: Radio voice of the Atlanta Braves

Ben Ingram (born March 13, 1980) is an American radio broadcaster who serves as a play-by-play voice of the Atlanta Braves on the Braves Radio Network. In 2022, the National Sports Media Association recognized him as Georgia Sportscaster of the Year.

== Early life and education ==
Born in Meridian, Mississippi, Ingram grew up in Madison, Mississippi and graduated from Madison Central High School. He got his start behind the microphone in 1998, calling junior college football games at age 18.

He went on to enroll at Mississippi College in Clinton, where, beginning as a sophomore, he served as the voice of the school's athletics program, broadcasting its football, baseball, and basketball games. He earned a communication degree from the school in 2003.

== Career ==
=== Minor leagues ===
Ingram began his career in professional baseball in 2005, when the Eugene Emeralds, the Single-A affiliate of the San Diego Padres, hired him. Two years later, in 2007, he was hired as the color commentator for the Mississippi Braves (the Braves' then Double-A affiliate) and in 2008 as the voice of the franchise. He continued calling football for his high school alma mater, Madison Central, during this time.

Ingram received the Southern League Radio Broadcaster of the Year award for 2009, his second season serving as the play-by-play broadcaster for the Mississippi Braves. Mississippi Braves General Manager Steve DeSalvo said of Ingram, "a great personality, a tremendous knowledge of the game, and a 'Big League' voice."

=== Atlanta Braves ===
While still a Mississippi Braves broadcaster in September 2009, Ingram went to the Atlanta Braves' radio booth, and during a rain delay, was given the opportunity to talk with then vice president of sales and marketing for the Braves, Derek Schiller. This resulted in Ingram being invited to call Atlanta games during the 2010 Spring Training. In 2011 he was hired full-time as the post-game show host and a backup play-by-play broadcaster for Atlanta, along with hosting pre-game coverage and hosting the Braves Clubhouse Report.

Ingram joined the regular play-by-play rotation in 2019 and took over as the team's primary announcer in 2021. That year, he also launched the "From the Braves Booth" podcast with fellow announcer Joe Simpson and producer Jonathan Chadwick.

For the 2025 season, Simpson serves as his main color commentator, with former players and broadcasters Darren O'Day and Charlie Culberson joining the booth for select games.
