= Johnny Doskow =

American sportscaster

Johnny Doskow is an American sportscaster for the Athletics of Major League Baseball.

Doskow grew up in Los Angeles. He graduated from the University of La Verne with a degree in communications, emphasizing radio and television in 1990. At La Verne, he called games for the school's radio station and wrote for the college newspaper.

Doskow became the broadcaster for the Cedar Rapids Kernels in 1993. He spent two seasons with the High Desert Mavericks and then went to the Fresno Grizzlies. Doskow joined the Sacramento River Cats after the 2000 season. He filled in for the Athletics in the 2012 season when Ken Korach recovered from knee surgery, working in 3 games. Doskow joined the Athletics full time in 2023.

In May 2023, Glen Kuiper was fired by the Athletics after using a racial slur on the air. Both Doskow and Vince Cotroneo rotated as TV play-by-play announcers for the Athletics for the remainder of the season.
