= Mike Pomeranz =

American TV journalist

Michael Pomeranz (born January 25, 1967) is an American studio host and announcer for San Diego Padres telecasts and studio host for the Anaheim Ducks on Bally Sports SoCal and Bally Sports West. In addition, Pomeranz hosts Inside San Diego Sports and both coaches' shows for SDSU Aztecs football and basketball on Bally Sports San Diego.

Pomeranz previously worked for KARE-TV in Minneapolis, Minnesota, anchoring the weekday evening 5, 6 and 10 pm newscasts from 2006 to 2012. Known fondly by Minnesotans as “Smilin’ Mike,” prior to KARE, he anchored and reported at WCBS-TV New York (2000–2005). He anchored various shows, beginning his tenure anchoring CBS 2 News This Morning and CBS 2 News at Noon, Pomeranz also anchored the weekend evening newscasts and weekdays at noon and 6 pm. Pomeranz was on the air during the September 11, 2001 attacks, and his station was the only terrestrial television station not knocked off the air due to the collapse of the World Trade Center.

He began his television career in 1994, working as a reporter and anchor in Chicago, Knoxville, Tennessee, and Colorado Springs, Colorado.

Pomeranz graduated from the Walter Cronkite School of Journalism at Arizona State University. He has been honored with several awards for his work both locally and nationally, including an RTDNA Edward R. Murrow Award for his reporting.

Before his news career, Pomeranz was a Minor League Baseball pitcher from 1988 until a shoulder injury in 1992 ended his career with a record of 9 wins and 18 losses, 4.73 ERA, in 88 games played.

On February 27, 2012, Pomeranz announced that he was leaving KARE to join Fox Sports San Diego (now Bally Sports San Diego). He hosts the Padres Live pre- and post-game show along with former first baseman Mark Sweeney and occasionally substituted for the late Dick Enberg on play-by-play of games.

He is not related to pitcher Drew Pomeranz, in spite of sharing the same first name with the latter's father, who is also a former college baseball pitcher.
