= Kelly Crull =

American sportscaster and television personality

- Born: Kelly Ann Crull; February 16, 1984 (age 42); Noblesville, Indiana
- Education: University of Missouri (BA)
- Occupations: Sportscaster; television personality; radio personality; podcaster
- Years active: 2006–present
- Employer: 680 AM / 93.7 FM The Fan

Kelly Ann Crull (born February 16, 1984) is an American sportscaster, television personality, radio personality, and podcaster who has been a digital and on-air contributor for the Oklahoma City Thunder, San Diego Padres, Chicago Cubs, Chicago Bulls, Atlanta Braves, and Atlanta Hawks. She has also worked for Fox Sports, NBC Sports Chicago, MLB on TBS, and Bally Sports.

== Early life ==
Crull is a native of Noblesville, Indiana, and attended Noblesville High School, where she played tennis and basketball. By her junior year, she realized that she was unlikely to play tennis professionally, but wanted to remain involved in sports. Being talkative and outgoing, she decided to pursue a career in sportscasting.

== Career ==
Crull earned a tennis scholarship to attend the University of Missouri, where she studied broadcast journalism. As part of her undergraduate experience, she worked for Columbia, Missouri NBC affiliate KOMU-TV, and she also had internships or did work for ESPN, the CBS News Bureau in London and Indianapolis NBC affiliate WTHR-TV. Crull graduated in 2006 and began her professional career at Lafayette, Indiana CBS affiliate WLFI-TV, where she covered the Purdue Boilermakers, Chicago Bears, Indianapolis Colts and Indianapolis 500.

In August 2008, she moved on to Oklahoma City ABC affiliate KOCO, where she served as the weekend sports anchor and a weekday sports reporter. She also covered the Oklahoma Sooners and Oklahoma State Cowboys. Then, she became a sideline reporter for the Oklahoma City Thunder for two seasons from 2010 to 2012. In addition to serving as the Thunder sideline reporter for the Fox Sports Network, she was host of the Thunder's pre-game show and weekly "Thunder Insider" show.

She joined Fox Sports San Diego in February 2013, serving as a beat reporter and hosting the "Padres Weekly" show. She also served as the backup sideline reporter (to primary sideline reporter Laura Rutledge) for the San Diego Padres. While a reporter for Fox, it became a tradition to drench Crull with gallons of liquid when the Padres had a walk-off victory.

Following the 2013 MLB season, she joined NBC Sports Chicago. In Chicago, she served as the Chicago Cubs beat reporter. She covered the Chicago Cubs World Series run in 2016. In February 2018, she co-hosted the sports trivia show Beer Money for its 100th episode. For the 2018–19 season, Crull served as the Chicago Bulls sideline reporter for the network. In 2020, Crull joined Bally Sports South and Bally Sports Southeast to cover the Atlanta Braves. In 2022, Crull worked as a field reporter for Major League Baseball on TBS. Crull's contract with Bally expired before the 2024 Major League Baseball season and she was promoted to radio host and podcaster ("Crull Me Maybe") for Atlanta station 680 AM / 93.7 FM The Fan after working several freelance appearances, including as a fill-in host on The Fan.
