= Shannon Drayer =

American sports journalist

Shannon Drayer is an American sports journalist who covers the Seattle Mariners for Seattle Sports (710 AM) radio in Seattle, Washington.

== Career ==
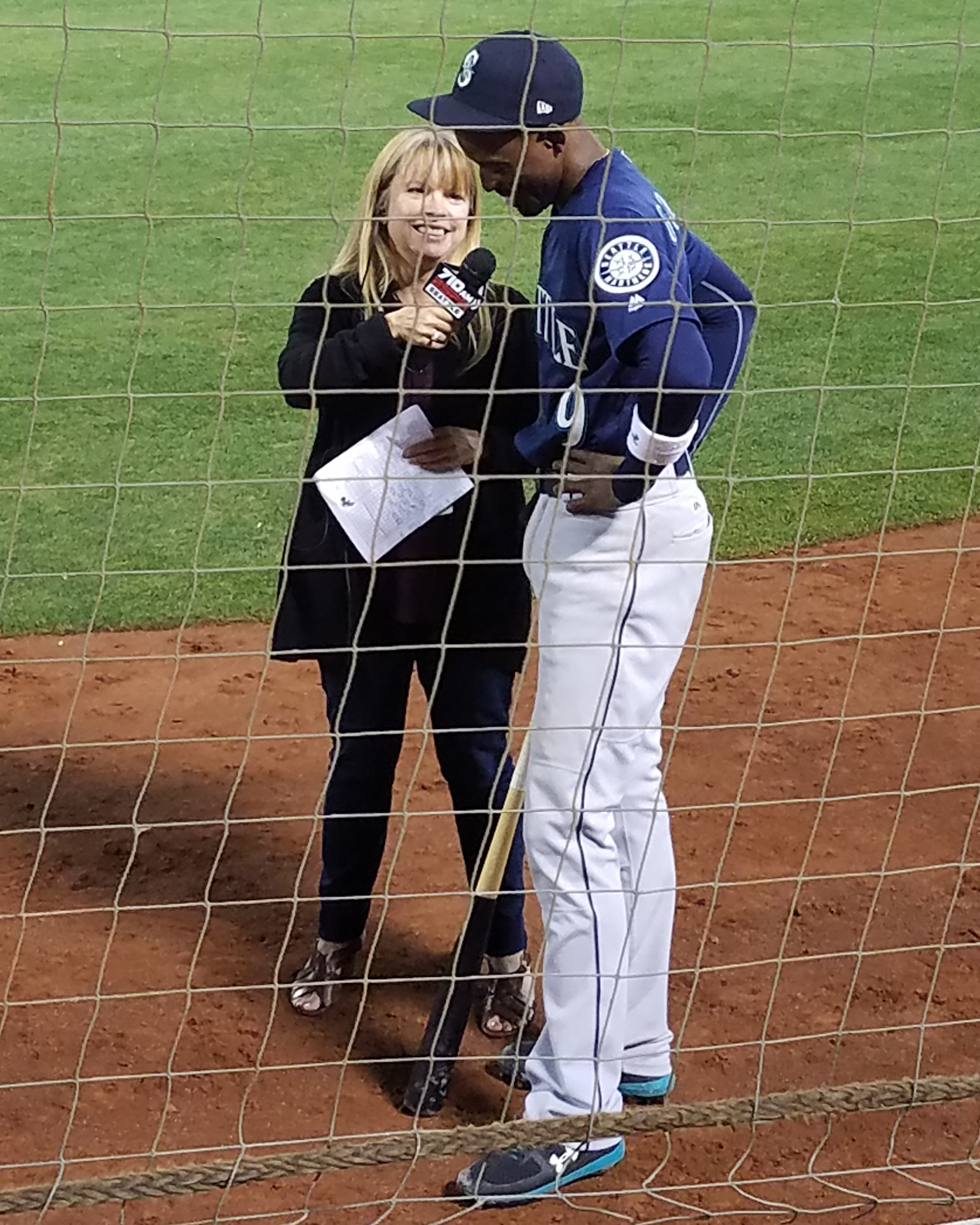
Drayer interviews Seattle Mariners player Dee Gordon after a game in Oakland in 2018.

In 1997, Drayer was working as a barista at a Starbucks coffee shop when a customer encouraged her to submit a tape for a sports radio contest at KJR, a Seattle sports radio station. As one of the finalists, Drayer started getting fill-in spots covering Washington Huskies men's basketball, the Seattle SuperSonics, the Seattle Seahawks, and the Mariners for KJR for four years.

In 2003, KOMO hired Drayer to cover the Mariners for their radio station full-time. She worked there for six years before being hired by KIRO, her current employer. Since 2009, Drayer has served as a clubhouse reporter, interviewing players and coaches before and after games for the radio station. She wrote a Mariners blog for KIRO's website and contributes to Seattle Sports' website.

=== Role as female sports reporter covering male athletes ===
Drayer said in an interview that while she loved baseball, she knew she could not play or manage because she was a woman. She initially dismissed journalism as a career because when she was in college in the late 1980s, "pretty much the only women who were working in sportscasting were ex- beauty queens and basketball players." When she was hired by KOMO, Drayer became one of the first American female sports journalists to travel with a team on their airplane. Drayer has said her gender was not an issue in the clubhouse and that as long as she did her job as a reporter professionally, she was treated the same as male colleagues. Generally, players have treated her with respect, opening doors for her and ensuring she has a chance to ask her questions, she said. She credited Mariners broadcaster Dave Niehaus and players Jamie Moyer and Ichiro Suzuki as being particularly helpful in her career.

== Personal ==
Drayer played trumpet in the Husky Marching Band. After receiving a degree in drama from the University of Washington, she spent a year in New York pursuing an acting career before moving back to Seattle. Her family includes her mother and father, two siblings, a stepmother, and two step-siblings. She also has two nieces and two nephews.
