= Angie Mentink =

American sports announcer

- Born: Angela Marie Marzetta; October 18, 1972 (age 53); Norfolk, Virginia, U.S.
- Education: University of Washington
- Occupation: Sports commentator
- Employer: MLB Local Media
- Spouse: Ornello Arlati (divorced); Jarrett Mentink
- Children: 2

Angela Marie Mentink (née Marzetta; formerly Arlati; born October 18, 1972) is an American sports television personality and former softball and baseball player who is currently a color commentator for the Seattle Mariners television broadcast. She played college softball for the Washington Huskies, where she earned All-American honors and went on to play in a women's professional baseball league before becoming a sports broadcaster.

== Early life and education ==
Born in Norfolk, Virginia, Mentink grew up in a United States Navy family and attended multiple high schools, including Taft High School in Woodland Hills, California, and Fort Mill High School in Fort Mill, South Carolina, before graduating from Corona del Sol High School in Tempe, Arizona, in 1990. Playing at linebacker and wingback, Mentink was the first girl at Taft to letter in football.

== Softball career ==
An outfielder, Mentink began her college softball career at Central Arizona College, earning first-team NJCAA All-American honors in 1992 and being part of two NJCAA national championship teams under coach Clint Myers. In college, she changed to hit left-handed to give her a faster time to first base.

She transferred to the University of Washington's inaugural Washington Huskies softball team. A third-team NFCA All-American honoree in 1994, Mentink became the first player in program history to earn both All-Pac-10 and All-American honors. She had 59 stolen bases in 63 attempts and hit .472 her junior year, all of which are school records. Her career .429 batting average is also a program record, as of 2025. She was the first softball player inducted into the Husky Hall of Fame, in 2001.

The U.S. national softball team named Mentink as an alternate for the 1996 Summer Olympics, but she instead chose to play for the Colorado Silver Bullets, the first women's professional baseball team since 1954. In 1995, she started 40 games for the Silver Bullets, hitting .221, and was paid $20,000 and unlimited Coors Light. In 1996, she hit .241 before retiring from her professional playing career.

In 1997, she served as an assistant softball coach for the Huskies.

== Broadcasting career ==
Mentink began her broadcasting career with Pioneer Sports as a color commentator for radio broadcasts of Washington Huskies baseball and softball. She then joined Fox Sports Northwest (later Root Sports Northwest), first as an intern then in 1998 as a reporter covering the Seattle Mariners and Seattle Seahawks. She served as co-anchor for Mariners All Access, a pre- and post-game show on Root Sports Northwest. Then known as Angie Arlati, Mentink briefly remotely anchored the Detroit Sports Report for Fox Sports Detroit.

On August 30, 2021, Mentink became the first woman to be a color commentator during a Mariners television broadcast. In 2024, she served as analyst for several Mariners games.

In 2025, Mentink became a full-time color commentator for the Mariners television broadcast, serving in a rotation with three former Mariners players. This marked the first time the Mariners have a woman serving in a full-time color commentator role.

== Personal life ==
In 2017, Mentink was diagnosed with breast cancer. After treatment, she was cancer-free in 2019. She is an advocate for early cancer detection. Mentink suffered a stroke in February 2026.

Mentink is married to Seattle Pacific University physical education professor and former basketball coach Jarrett Mentink. They have two sons. Both sons play baseball and attribute their skills to Mentink's coaching. They reside in Bonney Lake, Washington.

Mentink was previously married and reportedly dated Mariners player David Segui.
