= Peter Moylan =

Australian baseball player (born 1978)

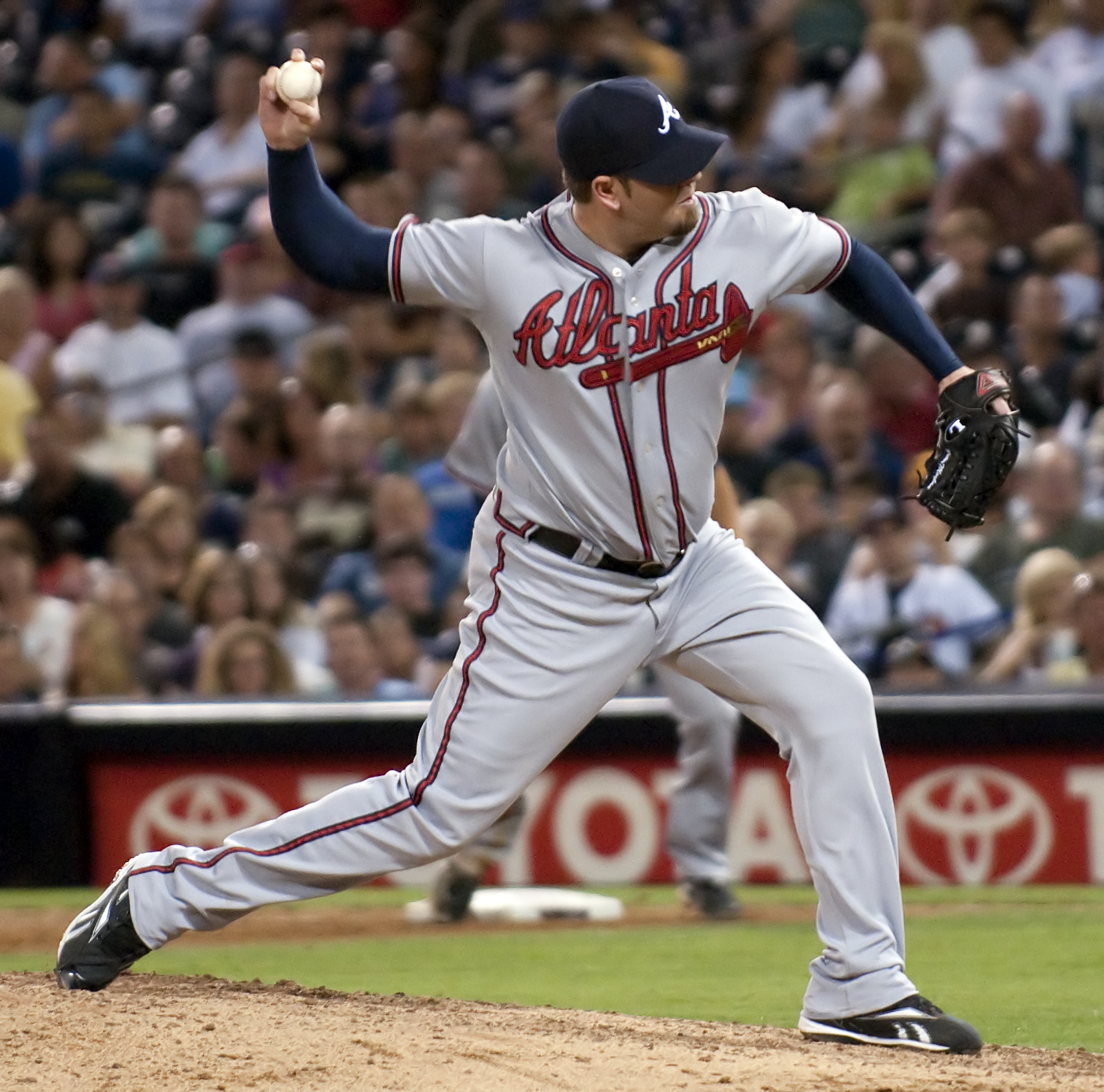
- Moylan with the Atlanta Braves
- Relief pitcher
- Born: 2 December 1978 (age 47); Lesmurdie, Western Australia, Australia
- Batted: Right Threw: Right

Professional debut
- CPBL: 5 June, 2003, for the Macoto Gida
- MLB: 12 April, 2006, for the Atlanta Braves

Last appearance
- CPBL: 14 June, 2003, for the Macoto Gida
- MLB: 28 July, 2018, for the Atlanta Braves

CPBL statistics
- Win–loss record: 1–0
- Earned run average: 3.00
- Strikeouts: 4

MLB statistics
- Win–loss record: 24–10
- Earned run average: 3.10
- Strikeouts: 324
- Stats at Baseball Reference

Teams
- Macoto Gida (2003); Atlanta Braves (2006–2012); Los Angeles Dodgers (2013); Atlanta Braves (2015); Kansas City Royals (2016–2017); Atlanta Braves (2018)

Peter Michael Moylan (born 2 December 1978) is an Australian former professional baseball player and current television sports commentator. In 2003, he played in the Chinese Professional Baseball League (CPBL) as a member of the Macoto Gida team, and from 2006 to 2018 he played in Major League Baseball (MLB) as a right-handed relief pitcher for the Atlanta Braves, Los Angeles Dodgers and Kansas City Royals. He featured a mid-90s miles per hour fastball and threw sidearm. After his playing career Moylan became a baseball analyst covering the Atlanta Braves for the Fox Sports South network, then FanDuel Sports Network and now for BravesVision.

== Professional career ==
=== Early career ===
Moylan began his professional career in the Minnesota Twins system. He was released in 1998 and returned to Australia, taking a job as a pharmaceutical salesman. Moylan eventually improved his pitching and began working on a comeback.

In 2003, Moylan played for the Macoto Gida of the Chinese Professional Baseball League, registering a 3.00 ERA in four games.

Moylan broke out while playing for the Australian team in the 2006 World Baseball Classic. He was selected for that tournament following his strong showing in the 2006 Claxton Shield. His 96 miles per hour (154 km/h) fastball enabled him to strike out established major-leaguers Bobby Abreu, Marco Scutaro, Ramón Hernández and Magglio Ordóñez. Based on his performance in this tournament, Moylan was invited to participate in spring training prior to the 2006 season with the Atlanta Braves.

=== Atlanta Braves ===
Moylan was signed by the Atlanta Braves in 2006 and assigned to the Triple-A Richmond Braves. On 11 April 2006, Moylan was called up to the Braves to replace Joey Devine in the bullpen and he made his MLB debut the following day at the age of 27, pitching one scoreless inning against the Philadelphia Phillies; however he was later sent back to the Richmond club. He pitched in 15 total games during three separate call-ups in 2006, with a 4.80 ERA in 15 innings.

At the end of spring training in 2007, Moylan was again assigned to Richmond, but he was quickly called up on 14 April due to the injury of pitcher Chad Paronto. Moylan sealed a permanent spot on the roster as he proved invaluable to the Braves bullpen in 2007. Moylan earned his first major league win against the Florida Marlins in Miami on 24 April 2007. He earned his first major league save three days later against the Colorado Rockies in Denver. He finished the season 5–3 with a 1.80 ERA. He led the majors in intentional walks allowed, with 12.

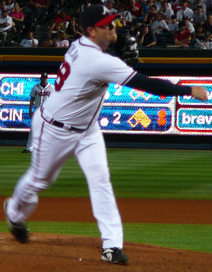
Moylan with the Braves in 2007

In April 2008, the Braves placed Moylan on the 15-day disabled list with a sore right elbow. Medical examination showed the ulna collateral ligament in Moylan's right elbow was compromised by a bone spur. On 5 May, Moylan was transferred to the 60-day disabled list, and missed the remainder of the 2008 season recovering from Tommy John surgery.

Moylan exceeded rehabilitation expectations and was declared fit to pitch during the Braves' 2009 Spring Training camp in Orlando, Florida. Moylan worked with former Braves closer Gene Garber to work on his side-arm/submarine delivery. He used the spring work to continue to gain arm strength, and began the season on the Braves active roster. After a few shaky appearances in April, Moylan began to find more consistency during May, settling into his role as the team's primary 7th inning specialist. Between the 80 appearances he made in 2007 and the 87 appearances in 2009, he became the first Braves pitcher to have two seasons with 80 or more games pitched. In addition, he did not allow a home run in 2009, setting a Major League Baseball record for the most consecutive appearances to start a season without giving up a home run, eclipsing the record of 73 set by Brian Shouse with the Milwaukee Brewers in 2007.

Moylan appeared in 85 games for the Braves in 2010, finishing with a 6–2 record and a 2.97 ERA. In 2011, Moylan appeared in seven games before being placed on the disabled list in mid-April. He underwent successful back surgery on 17 May 2011, and was expected to miss at least two months. Moylan returned to the Braves on 3 September 2011, but after six appearances, he was diagnosed with torn rotator cuff and labrum in his pitching shoulder. On 13 December, Moylan was non-tendered by Atlanta and became a free agent.

Although he was initially expected to miss most or possibly all of 2012, it was later estimated that he would need a six-month recovery period, allowing him to be ready for spring training in 2012.

While with the Braves, Moylan gained a reputation as a fan favourite through his embrace of Twitter and his sense of humor, even posting a link to a photo of himself in a dress stating he was wearing it to the ESPYs.

On 17 January 2012, the Braves re-signed Moylan to a minor league contract worth approximately $1 million. He only appeared in eight games with the Braves in 2012.

=== Los Angeles Dodgers ===
On 16 January 2013, the Los Angeles Dodgers signed Moylan to a minor-league deal and he was assigned to the AAA Albuquerque Isotopes. He was recalled to the Dodgers on 31 May. He appeared in 10 games with the Dodgers and was then optioned back to AAA on 29 June. In 38 games with the Isotopes, he was 4–1 with a 2.74 ERA. He returned to the Dodgers when rosters expanded on 1 September, where he appeared in four more games. Overall, he was 1–0 with a 6.46 ERA in 14 games for the Dodgers. The Dodgers designated him for assignment on 22 October 2013. He elected free agency on 29 October 2013.

=== Houston Astros ===
On 4 December 2013 Moylan signed a minor league contract with the Houston Astros. He was released on 26 March 2014.

=== Return to Atlanta Braves ===
On 5 March 2015 Moylan signed a two-year minor league deal with the Braves that included a spring training invite for 2016. The deal also made Moylan a player/coach in the Braves minor leagues in 2015 as he rehabbed from his second Tommy John surgery. On 16 August 2015, Moylan's contract was selected by the Braves after posting a 3.14 ERA and six saves in 27 games in AAA Gwinnett. On the same day, Moylan made his first major league appearance since 2013.

=== Kansas City Royals ===
On 23 January 2016, the Kansas City Royals signed Moylan to a minor-league deal.

He was released by the Royals on 28 March, and re-signed two days later.

On 17 February 2017, the Kansas City Royals re-signed Moylan to a minor-league deal.

He joined the Melbourne Aces of the Australian Baseball League as a pitching coach for the winter season after the 2017 season.

=== Third stint with Braves ===
Moylan re-signed with the Atlanta Braves on a one-year contract on 19 February 2018. On 28 February 2019, he retired from Major League Baseball at the age of 39.

=== Draci Brno ===
On 27 March 2019, Moylan signed with Draci Brno of the Czech Extraliga. On 29 March, Moylan made his Czech Extraliga debut at MBS against Technika Brno.

== International career ==
He represented Australia national baseball team at the 2006 World Baseball Classic, 2017 World Baseball Classic Qualification, 2017 World Baseball Classic and 2019 WBSC Premier12.

== Broadcast career ==
In April 2019 he joined Fox Sports South (now known as FanDuel Sports Network), as a pre- and post-game analyst for Atlanta Braves games.

In 2021, Moylan and Kelsey Wingert joined Jomboy Media to co-host the podcast Farm to Fame.

== Management career ==
On 13 April 2021, Moylan was named manager of the Melbourne Aces of the Australian Baseball League.
