= List of San Francisco Giants broadcasters =

== Primary broadcast team ==
For most Giants radio broadcasts on KNBR, Jon Miller and Dave Flemming take turns calling play-by-play (usually Miller will call innings 1-2, 5-6, 8-9, and Flemming will call innings 3-4, and 7). The Giants' telecasts on NBC Sports Bay Area and KNTV feature Duane Kuiper as play-by-play announcer with Mike Krukow as color analyst.

Through 2010, Miller held a second job as play-by-play announcer for ESPN Sunday Night Baseball, and therefore usually missed weekend Giants games. On these occasions, Greg Papa would take Miller's place on either the television or radio side; however, on weekends when the Giants were featured on Fox television (Saturday) or ESPN (Sunday) and therefore not on local TV, Kuiper and Krukow would join Flemming on the radio, and Miller would generally work the Saturday game if ESPN was in San Francisco that weekend. Since leaving ESPN, Miller also calls select games on NBC Sports Bay Area.

On July 14, 2006, for a Friday night home game, Flemming made his television broadcast debut for the Giants. Since then, Flemming and Kuiper have taken turns calling games on the radio and on NBC Sports Bay Area (Flemming calling innings 1-3, 7-9, and Kuiper calling innings 4-6 on the radio; and vice versa on TV) whenever Miller is off. Similarly, Miller and Kuiper also take turns on KNBR and NBC Sports Bay Area (Miller calling innings 1-3, 7-9, and Kuiper calling innings 4-6 on the radio; and vice versa on TV) when Flemming is off. During most road games, Flemming will call innings 1-3 and 7-9 on NBC Sports Bay Area, while Miller will call 4-6 (and vice versa on KNBR). On road trips when Kuiper comes, it would be like a normal home game unless Flemming is gone, so either KNBR will bring in Joe Ritzo or if the game is on national television, Kuiper will call the game with Miller.

After every game all of the announcers come together on the radio side for the "post game wrap", recapping the game's key plays and selecting players-of-the-game in humorous fashion.

== Additional broadcasters ==
F. P. Santangelo, formerly with the Washington Nationals, assisted Flemming on some broadcasts, and retired broadcaster Lon Simmons (died 2015) was usually present several times a season. Since May 2007, and only during weekend home games and road games against the A's, retired Giants first baseman J.T. Snow has performed color analyst duties alongside Flemming. In the 2010 season, Doug Greenwald (son of former Giants broadcaster Hank Greenwald and regular announcer for the AAA Fresno Grizzlies) called several Giants radio broadcasts as a substitute for Flemming. Former Giants reliever Jeremy Affeldt joined Kuiper for a radio broadcast on September 15, 2016.

Joe Ritzo, F. P. Santangelo, and Glen Kuiper are currently the fill-ins on KNBR when Kuiper, Miller, and/or Flemming are off/on TV. Shawn Estes, Javier Lopez, and Hunter Pence fill in for Mike Krukow when he is off.

Spanish-language radio broadcasts are handled by Erwin Higueros, who calls the play-by-play, and Tito Fuentes, who performs color analyst duties. Marvin Benard also serves as a color analyst for road games.

== Past broadcasters ==
Over the years, the Giants have employed numerous other on-air broadcasters, including Hall of Famers Russ Hodges and Lon Simmons, as well as Al Michaels, Hank Greenwald, Ron Fairly, Lindsey Nelson, Ted Robinson, and Joe Angel, among others in English, and Amaury Pi-Gonzalez, in Spanish.

== List of broadcasters ==
=== New York ===
==== Television ====
- Frank Frisch: 1947
- Steve Ellis: 1947–1948
- Russ Hodges: 1949–1957
- Al Helfer: 1949
- Ernie Harwell: 1950–1953
- Bob DeLaney: 1954–1957
- Jim Woods: 1957

==== Radio ====
- Arch McDonald: 1939
- Garnett Marks: 1939
- Mel Allen: 1939–1940, 1942
- Joe Bolton: 1940
- Connie Desmond: 1942
- Bill Slater: 1944–1945
- Don Dunphy: 1944
- Al Helfer: 1945, 1949
- Jack Brickhouse: 1946
- Steve Ellis: 1946–1947
- Frank Frisch: 1947–1948
- Maury Farrell: 1948
- Russ Hodges: 1949–1957
- Ernie Harwell: 1950–1953
- Bob DeLaney: 1954–1957
- Jim Woods: 1957

=== San Francisco ===
==== Television ====
- Russ Hodges: 1958–1971
- Lon Simmons: 1958–1973, 1977–1978, 1996–2002
- Bill Thompson: 1966–1973
- Al Michaels: 1974–1976
- Gary Park: 1974–1987
- Lindsey Nelson: 1979–1981
- Edgard Martinez: 1981
- Hank Greenwald: 1982–1986, 1989–1992
- Phil Stone: 1986
- Joe Morgan: 1986–1993
- Ron Fairly: 1987, 1990–1992
- Duane Kuiper: 1985–1992, 1994–present
- Steve Physioc: 1988-1989
- Ted Robinson: 1993–2001
- Mike Krukow: 1993–2026
- Jon Miller: 1997–present
- Joe Angel: 2002–2003
- Tim McCarver: 2002
- Greg Papa: 2004–2006
- Dave Flemming: 2006–present
- Jeremy Affeldt: 2017
- Javier López: 2017–present
- Shawn Estes: 2019–present
- Hunter Pence: 2021–present

==== Radio ====
- Russ Hodges: 1958–1971
- Lon Simmons: 1958–1973, 1976–1978, 1997–2002
- Bill King: 1958–1962
- Bill Thompson: 1965–1973
- Bill Rigney: 1969
- Al Michaels: 1974–1976
- Art Eckman: 1974–1975
- Joe Angel: 1977–1978, 2002–2003
- Lindsey Nelson: 1979–1981
- Hank Greenwald: 1979–1986, 1989–1996
- Dennis Higgins 2000
- David Glass: 1981–1985
- Phil Stone: 1986
- Ron Fairly: 1987–1992
- Wayne Hagin: 1987–1988
- Duane Kuiper: 1992, 1996–present
- Joe Morgan: 1992
- Ted Robinson: 1993–2001
- Barry Tompkins: 1993
- Mike Krukow: 1994–2003, 2006–2026
- Jon Miller: 1997–present
- Dave Flemming: (2003 substitute only) 2004–present
- Greg Papa: 2004–2009
- Joe Ritzo: 2021–present
- F. P. Santangelo 2022–present
- Glen Kuiper 2026-present

==== Spanish radio ====
- Enrique Bolanos: 1982
- Carlos Rivera: 1982, 1992
- Tito Fuentes: 1982-1991, 2005–present
- Ramón Rodriguez: 1983
- Armando Provedor: 1984-1985
- Edgard Martinez:1982–1986, 1988, 1994
- Julio González: 1989–1990, 1993–1997
- Eduardo Ortega: 1991
- Rene De La Rosa: 1993–1999
- Amaury Pi-Gonzalez: 1996–2006
- Erwin Higueros: 1998–present
- Marvin Benard: 2016–present

== List of broadcast outlets ==
=== New York ===
==== Television ====
- WNBT: 1947-1948
- WPIX: 1949-1957

==== Radio ====
- WABC: 1939-1941
- WOR: 1942-1943
- WINS: 1944-1945
- WMCA: 1946-1957

=== San Francisco ===
==== Television ====
- KTVU: 1961–2007
- GiantsVision: 1986–1989
- NBC Sports Bay Area: 1990–present (known as SportsChannel Pacific 1990-1997, Fox Sports Bay Area 1998-2007, Comcast Sports Bay Area 2008-2016)
- KNTV: 2008-present (select games, primarily Friday nights)

==== Radio ====
- KSFO: 1958-1978
- KNBR: 1979–present
- KNBR-FM: 2019–present (HD simulcast of KNBR AM)

==== Spanish radio ====
- KOFY: 1982–1985
- KIQI: 1986–1988, 2009–2011
- KLOK: 1989–1991, 2005–2008
- KZSF: 1999
- KTRB: 2012–2016
- KKSF: 2016
- KXZM: 2017–present

== See also ==
- List of current Major League Baseball announcers
