= 2012 World Series =

108th edition of Major League Baseball's championship series

- Official 2012 MLB World Series logo
Team (Wins)	Managers	Season
San Francisco Giants (4)	Bruce Bochy	94–68 (.580), GA: 8
Detroit Tigers (0)	Jim Leyland	88–74 (.543), GA: 3
- Dates: October 24–28
- Venue(s): AT&T Park (San Francisco); Comerica Park (Detroit)
- MVP: Pablo Sandoval (San Francisco)
- Umpires: Gerry Davis (crew chief), Dan Iassogna, Fieldin Culbreth, Brian O'Nora, Brian Gorman, Joe West
- Hall of Famers: Giants: None; Tigers: Jim Leyland (manager)

Broadcast
- Television: Fox (United States); MLB International (International)
- TV announcers: Joe Buck, Tim McCarver, Ken Rosenthal and Erin Andrews (Fox); Gary Thorne and Rick Sutcliffe (MLB International)
- Radio: ESPN; KNBR (SF); WXYT/WXYT-FM (DET)
- Radio announcers: Dan Shulman and Orel Hershiser (ESPN); Jon Miller, Dave Flemming, Duane Kuiper and Mike Krukow (KNBR); Dan Dickerson and Jim Price (WXYT)
- ALCS: Detroit Tigers over New York Yankees (4–0)
- NLCS: San Francisco Giants over St. Louis Cardinals (4–3)

The 2012 World Series was the championship series of Major League Baseball's (MLB) 2012 season. The 108th edition of the World Series, the series was a best-of-seven playoff between the National League (NL) champion San Francisco Giants and the American League (AL) champion Detroit Tigers; the Giants won in a four-game sweep. This marked the Giants' seventh World Series title in franchise history, their second in San Francisco (they won five in New York), and their second in a three-year period (2010–2012). Their World Series sweep was the first by an NL team since the Cincinnati Reds swept the Oakland Athletics in the 1990 series and the first NL sweep not by the Reds since 1963, when the Los Angeles Dodgers swept the New York Yankees. This was also the first World Series since 1988 to feature both of that year's League MVPs (Miguel Cabrera for the AL and Buster Posey for the NL). The Giants' Pablo Sandoval, who in Game 1 tied a record by hitting three home runs in one World Series game — two off Tigers' ace pitcher Justin Verlander — was named the World Series Most Valuable Player (MVP).

The San Francisco Giants held home field advantage for the World Series due to the NL winning the 2012 MLB All-Star Game: San Francisco hosted Games 1 and 2, and would have hosted Games 6 and 7 if these had been necessary to decide the Series. The 2012 series began on Wednesday, October 24, at AT&T Park in San Francisco, California and ended on Sunday, October 28, at Comerica Park in Detroit, Michigan, with the conclusion of the fourth game.

The Tigers advanced to the World Series after sweeping the Yankees in four games during the American League Championship Series. The Giants advanced to the World Series after winning the National League Championship Series four games to three over the St. Louis Cardinals, the 2011 World Series winners.

As of 2026, this is the most recent World Series to end in a sweep; 14 World Series have been played in this span.

== Background ==
=== 2012 All Star Game ===
In accordance with the standard since 2003, the outcome of the All-Star Game decided whether the American or National League would hold home field advantage in the World Series. The National League All-Star Team won the 2012 All-Star Game, played on July 10 in Kansas City, Missouri, by a score of 8–0. Representatives of both the Giants and the Tigers played key roles in the outcome. Giant players scored and/or drove in seven of the NL All-Star team's eight runs. The NL scored five runs in the first, all yielded by a Tiger, ace Justin Verlander. Pablo Sandoval would hit a triple, and Melky Cabrera—who would wind up the All-Star Game MVP—hit a home run during the game.

=== San Francisco Giants ===
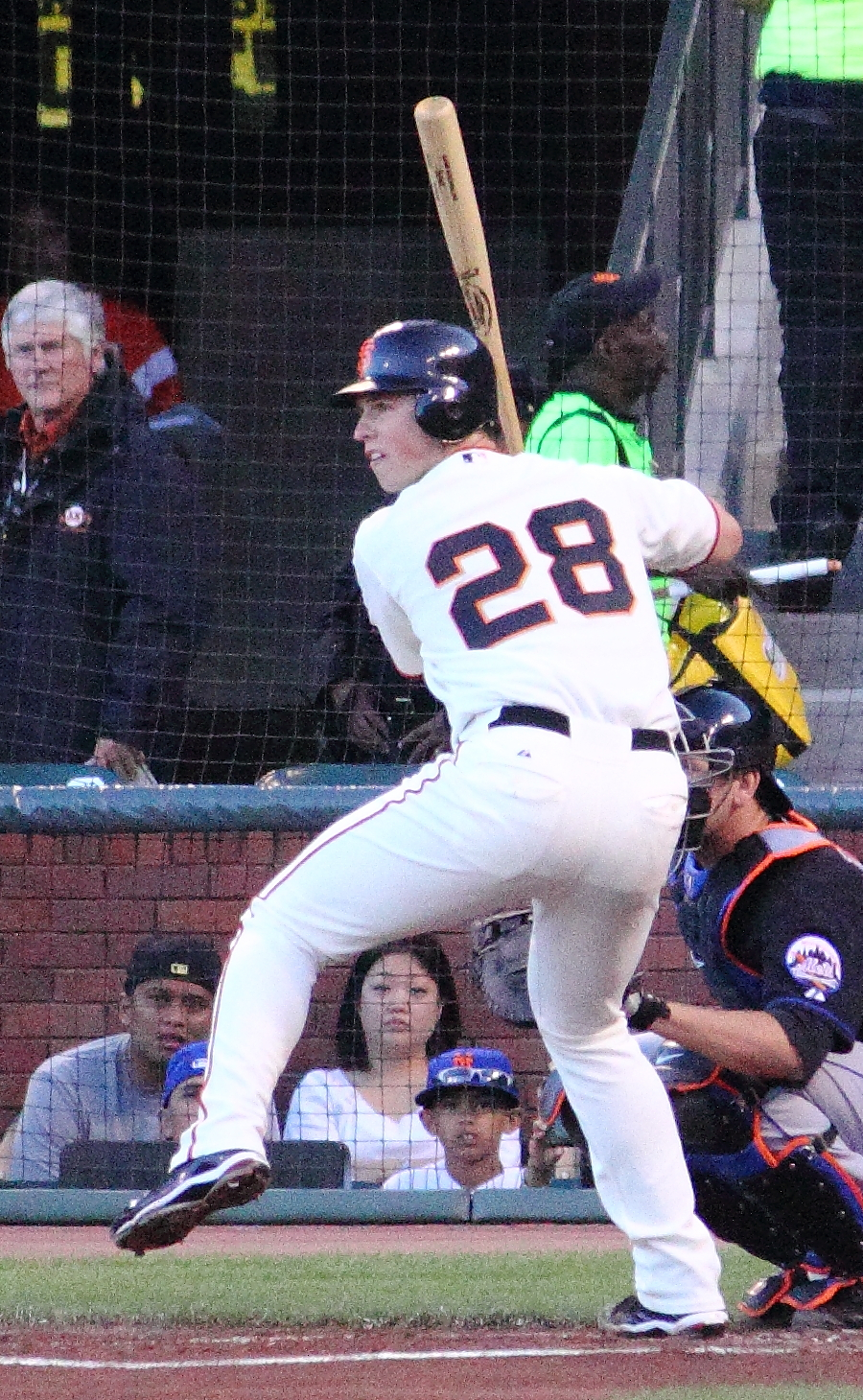
The Giants' Buster Posey was the league batting champion and the 2012 National League Most Valuable Player.

The Giants finished the regular season atop the National League West with a 94–68 record, eight games ahead of the second place Los Angeles Dodgers and good enough to secure the #3 seed in the NL. They defeated the second-seeded Cincinnati Reds in the National League Division Series, a best-of-five series, in five games. They then defeated the defending 2011 World Series champions, the fifth-seeded St. Louis Cardinals, in a seven-game series to capture the National League pennant. The manner in which the Giants defeated the Reds and then the Cardinals created some historical firsts.

Because of the addition of a wildcard game, the National League Division Series between the Giants and Reds began with two games in San Francisco. Cincinnati, who posted a better won-lost record than the Giants, hosted the final three games. The Giants lost the first two games at home in San Francisco, yet won the last three on the road. The Giants became the first major league team to win three straight road games in a best-of-five playoff series after losing the first two games at home. In the second round of the playoffs, the National League Championship Series, they came back from a three-games-to-one deficit to defeat the St. Louis Cardinals. Through this playoff course, the 2012 Giants became the first National League team and the second team in American major league baseball history (after the 1985 Kansas City Royals) to win six consecutive playoff games in which they had faced elimination. This was the Giants' 22nd NL pennant overall, their fifth as the San Francisco Giants. Their World Series berth was their second in three years (since 2010, when they defeated the Texas Rangers in five games). This was the fifth World Series in which the Giants faced a team from the American League Central Division (1917, 1924, 1933, 1954).

San Francisco's notable preseason acquisitions were outfielders Melky Cabrera and Ángel Pagán. Cabrera set the Giants' franchise record for hits in the month of May, with 51, and Pagán set the San Francisco Giants record for triples in a season, with 15. On August 15, Major League Baseball meted a 50-game suspension upon Cabrera for his use of a banned substance. At the time, his 159 hits led both leagues, his .346 batting average measured second in the NL, and he had received the 2012 All-Star Game MVP. The suspension expired after the NLDS, but the Giants opted not to add him to the team's NLCS or World Series rosters.

All-Star Buster Posey finished the regular season with a .336 batting average to win the 2012 NL batting championship. In the World Series, he would go on to catch every inning, including the shutouts in Game 2 and Game 3. He would homer in Game 4. He would, in the World Series, not allow any baserunners to advance by either passed ball, stolen base, or wild pitch. He would begin a double play in Game 1 and execute an important tag play in Game 2.

Earlier in the regular season, starting pitcher Matt Cain threw the first perfect game in Giants history, and the 22nd in American major league history, on June 13. He would start Game 4 of the World Series, which the Giants would win to clinch.

Relief pitcher Sergio Romo contributed to team success by converting 14 out of 15 save opportunities after an injury sidelined closer Brian Wilson a few days after the season began. Romo converted three saves in the World Series, including the Game 4 clincher, which ended with Romo striking out the 2012 American League MVP.

Midseason addition Marco Scutaro ended the regular season with a .306 batting average and a 20-game hitting streak. In October, Scutaro tied a League Championship Series record with 14 hits (and a .500 average) against the Cardinals, and he received the NLCS MVP. In the World Series, his Game 4 tenth-inning single drove home a run that gave the Giants a lead the team would not relinquish.

Bruce Bochy made his third World Series appearance as a manager, his second with the Giants. Bochy led San Francisco to the 2010 title. Before that, he led the 1998 San Diego Padres to the World Series, where the New York Yankees swept. Bochy would win his second World Series title.

Bochy's starting rotation for the 2012 World Series: Barry Zito in Game 1, Madison Bumgarner in Game 2, Ryan Vogelsong in Game 3 and Matt Cain in Game 4.

=== Detroit Tigers ===
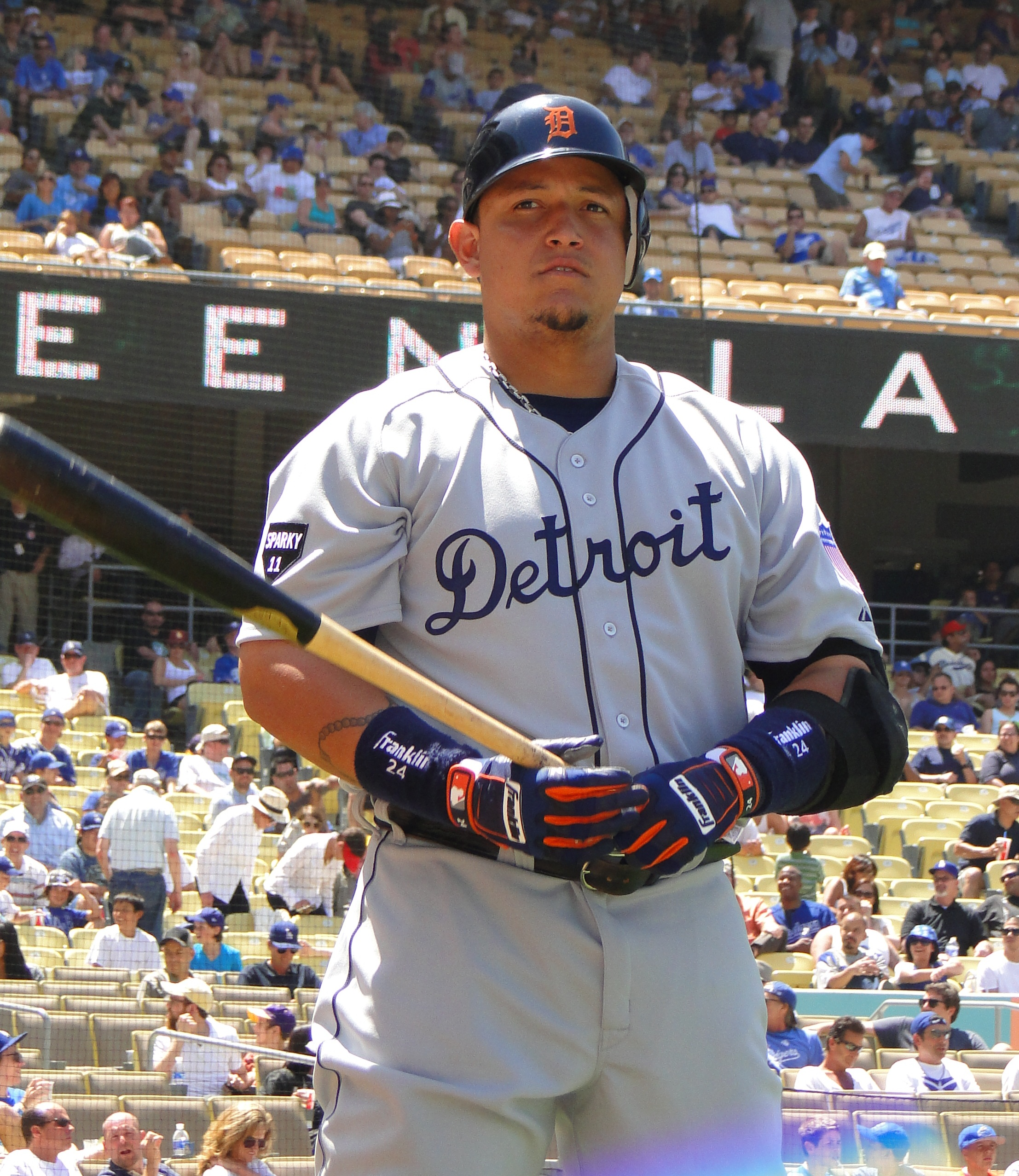
The Tigers' Miguel Cabrera won the Triple Crown.

The Tigers finished the regular season atop the American League Central, with 88 wins and 74 losses. The Tigers repeated as champions of this division, having also won it in 2011. This was their first repeat title in the divisional-play era (i.e., since 1969). The last time, before 2011–2012, that the Tigers franchise had made consecutive playoff appearances was 1934–1935.

The Tigers entered the postseason as the third seed in the AL, and defeated the second-seeded Oakland Athletics in the American League Division Series three games to two. The Tigers then captured their 11th American League pennant, sweeping the top-seeded New York Yankees four games to none in the American League Championship Series. This World Series berth was their first since 2006, when the St. Louis Cardinals defeated them four games to one. The Tigers entered the World Series as heavy favorites to win the title, despite the Giants having home-field advantage and the better regular season record.

The 2012 Tigers became the fourth team to accomplish a four-game sweep in an ALCS. The three other teams to do so (1988 Oakland A's, 1990 Oakland A's, and 2006 Detroit Tigers) did not win the World Series, and the 2012 Tigers would, in the 2012 World Series, continue this trend.

Pitcher Justin Verlander (17–8) led the American League in strikeouts with 239. Max Scherzer (16–7) finished second in the AL with 231 strikeouts. During the 2012 season, pitcher Doug Fister set an AL record by striking out nine consecutive batters.

Miguel Cabrera became the first player in 45 years (since Carl Yastrzemski in 1967) to win the Triple Crown. Miguel Cabrera compiled a .330 average, hit 44 home runs, and had 139 RBIs, all of which led the American League. In the 2012 ALCS, Cabrera extended his hitting streak in LCS games to 17, a major league LCS record. (Cabrera made ten hits in seven games with the Florida Marlins in the 2003 NLCS, eight hits in six games with the Tigers in the 2011 ALCS, and five hits in the Tigers' 2012 ALCS sweep.) Including this season, Miguel Cabrera has played in exactly 17 LCS games. Miguel Cabrera would compile a .231 batting average for, and make the last out of, the 2012 World Series.

In January 2012, prior to the start of the season, the Tigers signed first baseman Prince Fielder to a nine-year, $214 million contract. In the 2012 World Series, Prince Fielder would manage only one hit, a single, in 14 at-bats.

Manager Jim Leyland made his third trip to the World Series, and his second with the Tigers (he also managed them in 2006). He managed the 1997 Florida Marlins to a seven-game victory in the World Series.

Leyland's starting rotation for the 2012 World Series: Verlander in Game 1, Doug Fister in Game 2, Aníbal Sánchez in Game 3, and Scherzer in Game 4. In Game 1 of the World Series, Verlander would not fare much better against Giant bats than he had in the All-Star Game; allowing five earned runs in four innings.

== Summary ==
San Francisco won the series, 4–0.

Game	Date	Score	Location	Time	Attendance
1	October 24	Detroit Tigers – 3, San Francisco Giants – 8	AT&T Park	3:26	42,855
2	October 25	Detroit Tigers – 0, San Francisco Giants – 2	AT&T Park	3:05	42,982
3	October 27	San Francisco Giants – 2, Detroit Tigers – 0	Comerica Park	3:25	42,262
4	October 28	San Francisco Giants – 4, Detroit Tigers – 3 (10)	Comerica Park	3:34	42,152

The Giants' Pablo Sandoval was named the MVP of the series after hitting .500 with three home runs.

== Umpiring crew ==
Gerry Davis, as senior umpire, served as crew chief for the six-man crew. With his work in this Series, Davis set a new record for postseason games umpired in American major league history, with 115.

Fellow regular-season crew chiefs Brian Gorman and Joe West assisted Davis, along with Fieldin Culbreth, Dan Iassogna and Brian O'Nora.

== Matchups ==
=== Game 1 ===
October 24, 2012 5:07 pm (PDT) at AT&T Park in San Francisco, California 62 °F (17 °C), Partly cloudy
Team	1	2	3	4	5	6	7	8	9	R	H	E
Detroit	0	0	0	0	0	1	0	0	2	3	8	0
San Francisco	1	0	3	1	1	0	2	0	X	8	11	0
WP: Barry Zito (1–0) LP: Justin Verlander (0–1); Home runs: DET: Jhonny Peralta (1); SF: Pablo Sandoval 3 (3); Attendance: 42,855; Boxscore

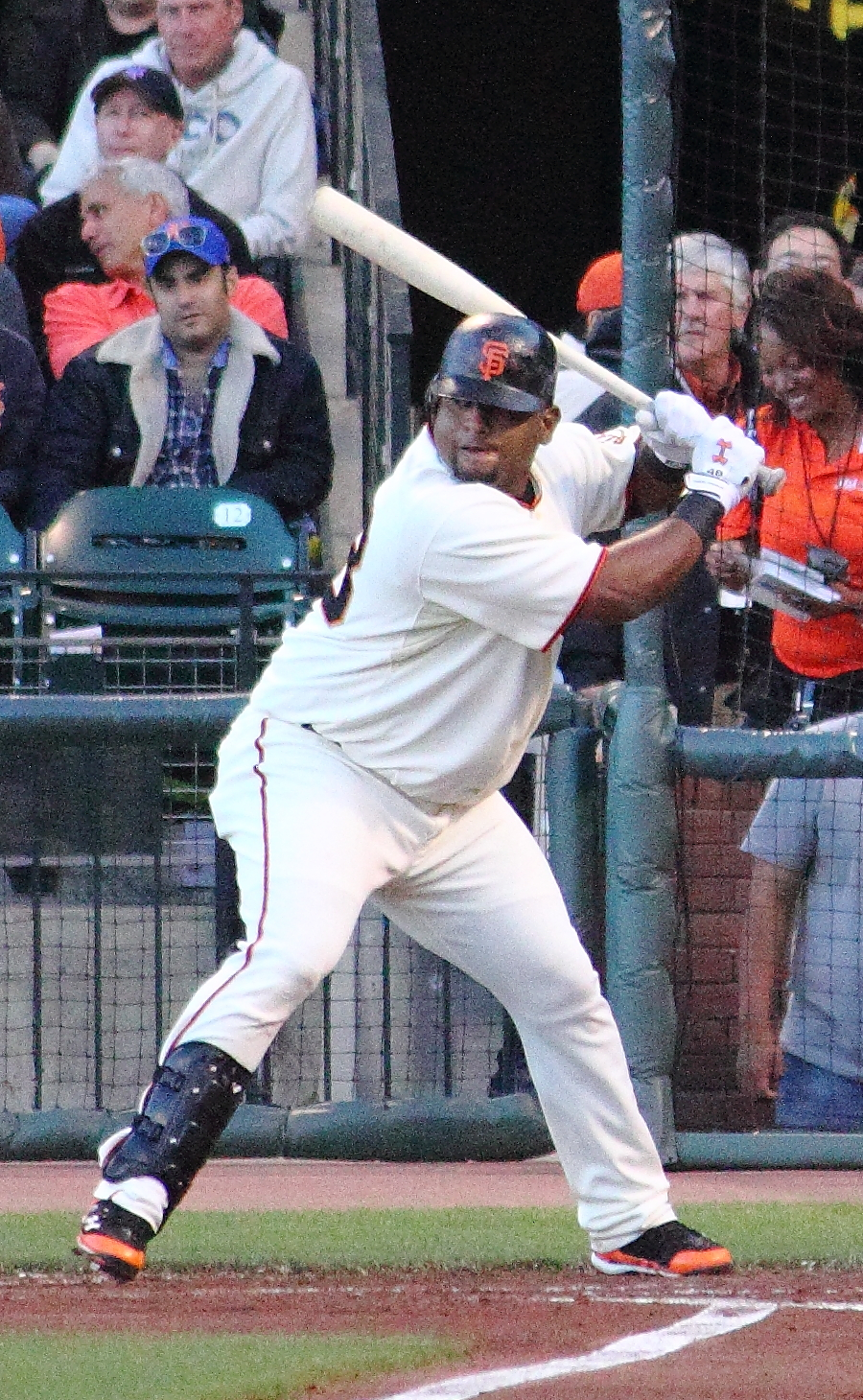
The Giants' Pablo Sandoval hit three home runs in Game 1.

The Giants jumped out to a 6–0 lead, scoring in four of the first five innings of Game 1, en route to an 8–3 victory. Pablo Sandoval went four-for-four, driving in four runs on three home runs. He joined Babe Ruth (in 1926 and 1928), Reggie Jackson (in 1977) and Albert Pujols (in 2011) as the only players to ever hit three home runs in one World Series game. Sandoval became the first to hit three homers in Game 1 of a World Series and homer in his first three plate appearances. Tigers ace pitcher Justin Verlander lasted only four innings, giving up five Giant runs. Sandoval's first two homers came off Verlander, a two-out home run in the first and two-run home run in the third after Angel Pagan doubled with two outs and scored on Marco Scutaro's single. Sandoval's third home run came in the fifth off Al Alburquerque. San Francisco starting pitcher Barry Zito allowed only one run in 5 2/3 innings, and drove in a run with a fourth-inning single. The one run came in the sixth when Austin Jackson doubled to lead off and scored on Miguel Cabrera's single. The Giants scored their final two runs in the seventh inning off Tiger relief pitcher José Valverde, who failed to convert saves in previous stages of the postseason. Pagan doubled with one out, then scored on Scutaro's single. After Sandoval singled, Scutaro scored on Buster Posey's single. In the top of the ninth, Jhonny Peralta hit a two-run home run off George Kontos to cut the lead to 8–3, but Jeremy Affeldt came in relief of Kontos and got Ramon Santiago to ground out for the final out of the game to give the Giants a 1–0 series lead.

After Zito allowed a run on three hits in the sixth inning, Tim Lincecum relieved him. Lincecum pitched 2 1/3 perfect innings, striking out five. Three Cy Young Award winners (Lincecum, Verlander and Zito) pitched in Game 1, the first time this has happened since Game 3 of the 1983 World Series, when Jim Palmer relieved Mike Flanagan, in a contest against Steve Carlton.

=== Game 2 ===
October 25, 2012 5:07 pm (PDT) at AT&T Park in San Francisco, California 64 °F (18 °C), Scattered clouds
Team	1	2	3	4	5	6	7	8	9	R	H	E
Detroit	0	0	0	0	0	0	0	0	0	0	2	0
San Francisco	0	0	0	0	0	0	1	1	X	2	5	0
WP: Madison Bumgarner (1–0) LP: Doug Fister (0–1) Sv: Sergio Romo (1); Attendance: 42,982; Boxscore

A shutout win in Game 2 gave the Giants a two-games-to-none lead in the Series. In the top of the second, with Prince Fielder on first, Delmon Young lined a double into the left field corner. Tiger third base coach Gene Lamont waved Fielder home, but with accurate throws by left fielder Gregor Blanco and second baseman Marco Scutaro, catcher Buster Posey tagged out Fielder in a close play at the plate. In the bottom of the second, Doug Fister was struck in the head by a Blanco line drive but stayed in the game, pitching out of a bases-loaded jam. Game 2 remained scoreless until the bottom of the seventh. Hunter Pence led off with a single, Brandon Belt drew a walk, then Blanco executed a perfect bunt down the third base line. The ball came to rest just fair, halfway between third base and home, allowing Blanco to reach safely while both runners advanced. With the bases loaded and nobody out, Brandon Crawford grounded into a double play, scoring Hunter Pence. This was the only run Fister allowed in six sharp innings, pitching well despite the second inning scare. In the eighth, with the bases loaded and one out, Pence hit a sacrifice fly to right field, scoring Ángel Pagán with the second and final Giant run of the game. Madison Bumgarner pitched seven shutout innings, yielding only two hits and striking out eight, for the win.

=== Game 3 ===
October 27, 2012 8:07 pm (EDT) at Comerica Park in Detroit, Michigan 47 °F (8 °C), Overcast
Team	1	2	3	4	5	6	7	8	9	R	H	E
San Francisco	0	2	0	0	0	0	0	0	0	2	7	1
Detroit	0	0	0	0	0	0	0	0	0	0	5	1
WP: Ryan Vogelsong (1–0) LP: Aníbal Sánchez (0–1) Sv: Sergio Romo (2); Attendance: 42,262; Boxscore

The Giants' 2–0 victory in Game 3 was the team's second straight shutout. Matching the 2010 Giants team that also recorded two shutouts in the World Series, San Francisco became the first team since the 1966 Baltimore Orioles to record back-to-back World Series shutouts. (The 1966 Orioles, who threw three straight shutouts in Games 2–4, also swept the World Series, defeating the Los Angeles Dodgers.) The 2012 Giants became the first NL team to do so since the 1919 Cincinnati Reds, who threw back-to-back shutouts against the Chicago White Sox. These were the first back-to-back postseason shutouts for the franchise since 1917, where the New York Giants ultimately lost to the Chicago White Sox.

The only runs of the game came in the Giant half of the second inning. A one-out triple off the bat of Gregor Blanco scored Hunter Pence from third. A two-out single by Brandon Crawford then scored Blanco. Those were the only runs Tigers starter Aníbal Sánchez allowed in seven otherwise good innings with eight strikeouts, but it was enough to saddle him with the loss.

San Francisco starter Ryan Vogelsong pitched 5 2/3 shutout innings. Detroit loaded the bases with one out in the fifth inning. Vogelsong struck out Quintin Berry. Then, Vogelsong threw a pitch near the hands of the next batter, Miguel Cabrera, which induced a pop fly to end the inning. As in Game 1, Tim Lincecum relieved the Giants' starter, and pitched 2 1/3 scoreless innings. As in Game 2, Sergio Romo converted a save, his second of three in the Series.

=== Game 4 ===
The crowd in San Francisco Civic Center reacting just as the Giants won. City Hall visible in the background

October 28, 2012 8:15 pm (EDT) at Comerica Park in Detroit, Michigan 44 °F (7 °C), Overcast & windy
Team	1	2	3	4	5	6	7	8	9	10	R	H	E
San Francisco	0	1	0	0	0	2	0	0	0	1	4	9	0
Detroit	0	0	2	0	0	1	0	0	0	0	3	5	0
WP: Santiago Casilla (1–0) LP: Phil Coke (0–1) Sv: Sergio Romo (3); Home runs: SF: Buster Posey (1); DET: Miguel Cabrera (1), Delmon Young (1); Attendance: 42,152; Boxscore

Game 4 extended into extra innings. Marco Scutaro's RBI single in the top of the tenth, which allowed Ryan Theriot to score, proved the difference in the Giants' 4–3 victory. With the Game 4 victory, the Giants took the 2012 World Series, four games to none.

San Francisco scored the first run of the game, in the top of the second inning. With one out, Brandon Belt tripled off starter Max Scherzer to right field, scoring Hunter Pence. Belt was stranded at third after a groundout and a flyout.

In the third inning, Detroit took its first and only lead of the series. Austin Jackson walked and advanced to second on a sacrifice bunt by Quintin Berry. Miguel Cabrera then hit a high fly ball off Matt Cain towards right field, Hunter Pence had a chance to catch it but a strong wind drifted the ball out for a two-run home run. The shot snapped what was a 20-inning scoreless streak for the Tigers.

The Giants regained the lead in the sixth inning. Scutaro hit a ground ball down the third-base line that Detroit third baseman Cabrera could not field cleanly, resulting in an infield hit.Buster Posey then hit a two-run home run. Posey's shot stayed just inside the left-field pole as it carried out. In the bottom of the same inning, Delmon Young tied the game with a home run to right, off Giant pitcher Matt Cain, that landed over the fence in right-center. However, this was the last hit for the Tigers in the game.

Strong relief pitching sent the game into extra innings. After relieving Scherzer in the seventh with one out, Tigers relievers Drew Smyly and Octavio Dotel combined to shut out the Giants for two innings. After a leadoff walk in the bottom of the eighth, Giant pitcher Jeremy Affeldt struck out the heart of the Tigers batting order. In the top of the ninth, Tiger pitcher Phil Coke struck out three consecutive Giant batters. Coke set a World Series record by striking out seven consecutive batters, dating back to his appearances in Games 2 and 3. Affeldt and Santiago Casilla combined for a scoreless bottom of the ninth.

In the top of the 10th, Ryan Theriot ended Coke's strikeout streak, leading off with a single to right. A sacrifice bunt by Brandon Crawford moved Theriot to second. Ángel Pagán struck out. Then Scutaro served a single in front of center-fielder Austin Jackson, which scored the decisive run.

Closer Sergio Romo struck out the side in the bottom of the 10th. The Series ended with umpire Brian O'Nora calling a third strike on Miguel Cabrera. After throwing Cabrera several consecutive sliders, Romo threw a fastball that backed into Cabrera's zone, which may have surprised the batter.

Because they won the Series away from their home field, the Giants accepted the World Series Championship Trophy and the World Series MVP award in their locker room. (Incidentally, the franchise clinched its last four World Series victories away from home.) The Giants' unexpected sweep of the Tigers was deemed as a significant upset by the media.

== Composite line score ==
2012 World Series (4–0): San Francisco Giants (N.L.) beat Detroit Tigers (A.L.)

Team	1	2	3	4	5	6	7	8	9	10	R	H	E
Detroit Tigers	0	0	2	0	0	2	0	0	2	0	6	20	1
San Francisco Giants	1	3	3	1	1	2	3	1	0	1	16	32	1
Total attendance: 170,251 Average attendance: 42,563; Winning player's share: $377,022.64 Losing player's share: $284,274.50

== Broadcasting ==
=== Television ===
In the United States, Fox televised the games, with Joe Buck calling play-by-play in his 15th World Series, and Tim McCarver handling color commentary for his 23rd World Series. Ken Rosenthal also appeared on the Fox telecasts as a field reporter, with Erin Andrews and Chris Myers joining him for select games. MLB International syndicated its own telecast of the series, with announcers Gary Thorne and Rick Sutcliffe, to various networks outside the U.S. Additionally, the American Forces Network and Canadian Forces Radio and Television carried the games to U.S. and Canadian service personnel stationed around the globe. Fox Deportes carried the Series in Spanish on American cable and satellite TV.

However, on August 24, Tribune removed Fox-affiliate WTIC-TV from Cablevision systems in Connecticut, causing viewers to miss Games 1 and 2 of the series. An agreement between Cablevision and Tribune was reached on October 26, the day before Game 3.

==== Ratings ====
According to Nielsen Media Research, the four-game series on Fox averaged a record-low 7.6 rating and 12 share. The previous low was an 8.4 rating for both the 2008 and the 2010 World Series, which each went five games. The 6.1 rating in Game 3 matched the lowest rating for any World Series game with Game 3 in 2008; that year, a rain delay moved the start of the game to after 10 p.m. on the East Coast with the game not ending until 1:47 a.m. Hurricane Sandy contributed to the low number of viewers as most residents on the East Coast were preparing for the storm's arrival during the series.

Game	Ratings (households)	Share (households)	American audience (in millions)
1	7.6	12	12.2
2	7.8	12	12.3
3	6.1	11	10.5
4	8.9	14	15.5

=== Radio ===
ESPN Radio broadcast the World Series nationally, with Dan Shulman and Orel Hershiser working their second consecutive World Series together. ESPN Deportes Radio aired the Series for Spanish language listeners, with Ernesto Jerez and Guillermo Celis announcing.

Locally, the two teams' flagship stations broadcast the series with their respective announcing crews. The Giants' English-language broadcasts aired on KNBR (with Dave Flemming, Jon Miller, Mike Krukow, and Duane Kuiper announcing) with their Spanish-language broadcasts on KIQI (with Erwin Higueros and Tito Fuentes), while WXYT-FM and AM carried the Tigers' English-language broadcasts (with Dan Dickerson and Jim Price). Due to contractual obligations, the non-flagship stations on the teams' radio networks carried the ESPN Radio broadcasts of the games, although the local broadcasts were also available on XM Satellite Radio and to Gameday Audio subscribers at MLB.com.

=== International distribution ===
Beyond the United States telecast on Fox, the series aired widely overseas via MLB International, which produced a separate world feed with Gary Thorne and Rick Sutcliffe on commentary. American and Canadian service members also received coverage through the American Forces Network and Canadian Forces Radio and Television, while Fox Deportes provided a Spanish-language telecast in the U.S. A cable-carriage dispute in the New York tri‑state region briefly affected access for some viewers: Tribune’s dispute with Cablevision blacked out Fox affiliate WTIC‑TV for part of the series before an agreement was reached on October 26, the day before Game 3.

== Historical notes ==
The Tigers became only the third team to be swept in the World Series after sweeping the League Championship Series (LCS), joining the 1990 Oakland Athletics and the 2007 Colorado Rockies with this distinction.

For the fourth time since 1985, when the MLB postseason expanded the LCS to a best of 7, the World Series saw a team who swept its LCS face a team who won a LCS Game 7. The previous three times, 1988, 2006, and 2007, the Game 7 pennant-winner prevailed. This trend continued in 2012. The next time it would happen would be in 2025, though in that case it would be the sweeper that prevailed.

The 2012 World Series was the first since 1954 to feature the batting champions from each league, Buster Posey of the Giants and Miguel Cabrera of the Tigers (the 1954 Series showcased Willie Mays of the New York Giants and Bobby Ávila of the Cleveland Indians). Cabrera and Posey had been voted the MVP of their respective leagues (announced and awarded, as usual, after the World Series), making this the first World Series since 1988 to feature both league MVPs (1988 saw the Oakland Athletics' Jose Canseco and the Los Angeles Dodgers' Kirk Gibson meet).

The Giants became the first team since the 1966 Baltimore Orioles and the first NL team since the 1919 Cincinnati Reds to achieve consecutive shutouts in the World Series. Giants pitching held the Tigers to a .159 batting average in the Series, the 3rd lowest for a team all-time in the World Series, behind the Los Angeles Dodgers hitting .142 against the Orioles in the 1966 World Series and the Baltimore Orioles hitting .146 against the New York Mets in the 1969 World Series.

With the Giants winning Game 4 in extra innings to win the series, they became the eighth team to win a World Series-clinching game in extra innings and the first to do so since the 1997 Florida (now Miami) Marlins clinched the series in Game 7 in 11 innings. They were the first Giants team to do so since Game 5 of the 1933 World Series against the Washington Senators (now Minnesota Twins) in Washington when the Giants were in New York. After sweeping this series 4–0, Bruce Bochy became the fourth World Series Manager to be on a winning side and losing side of a sweep, having lost in a four-game sweep against the New York Yankees as the San Diego Padres manager in 1998. Miller Huggins, Walter Alston and Tony La Russa were the other three.

As the Giants represented the National League during the 1912 World Series (though at the time they were based in New York), the Giants became the first team to play in the World Series a century after an appearance. The Red Sox would later accomplish this feat in 2018.

== Aftermath ==
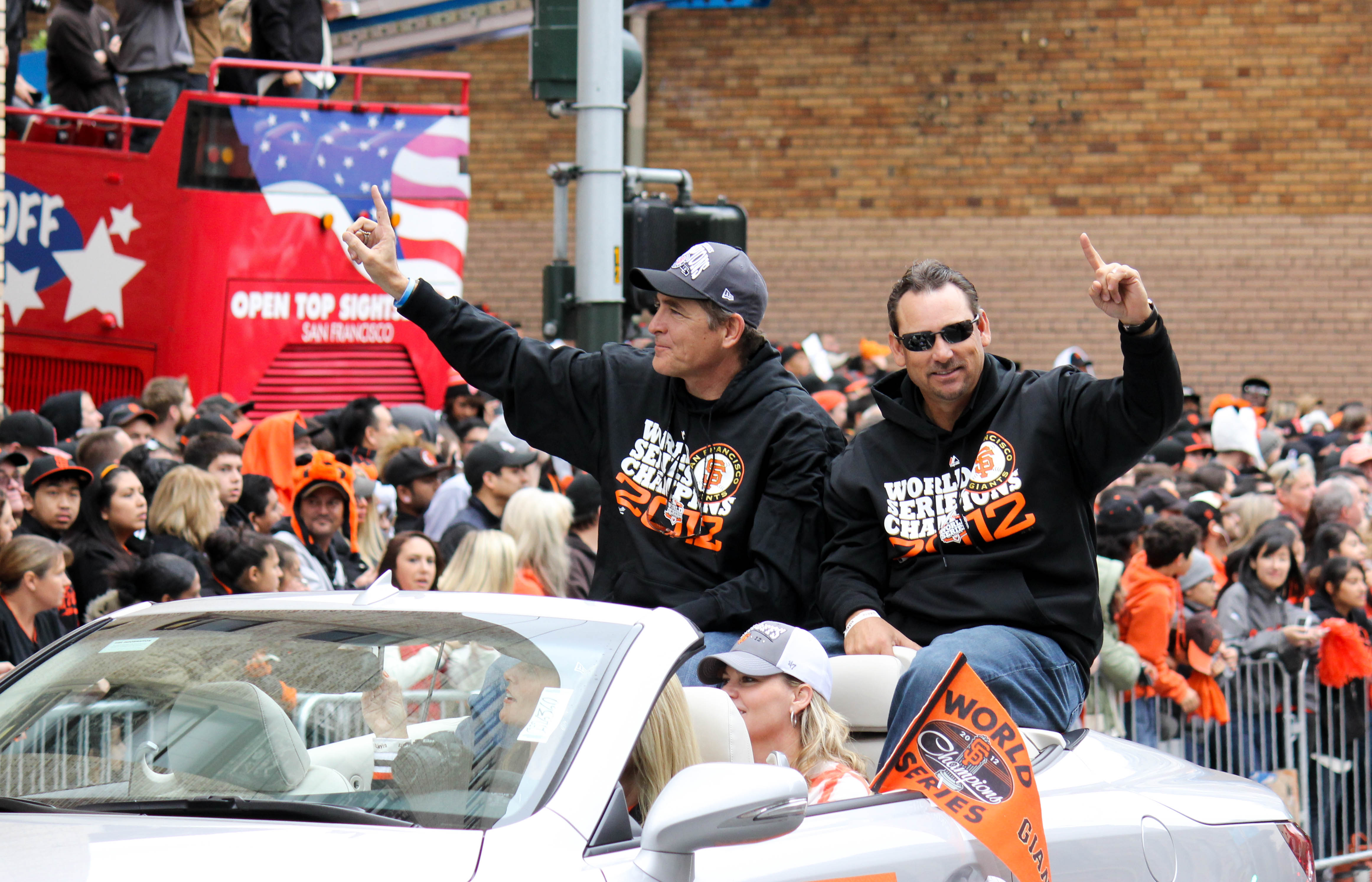
Dave Righetti and Mark Gardner during the 2012 Giants victory parade

An estimated crowd of over 1 million people attended a Halloween Day victory parade along Market Street in San Francisco.

The Giants failed to defend their World Series championship in 2013. San Francisco led the National League West early in the season, but critical injuries (including the loss of Pagan for three months) and subpar play on both ends doomed the Giants. They were eliminated from the playoff race on September 11, 2013, becoming the second defending World Series champion in three years to not make the postseason, after the 2011 Giants. In 2014, the Giants would, again, win the World Series and thereby continue their even-years streak of pennants and World Championships (2010, 2012, and 2014) .

The Tigers would win the American League Central division championship for the third straight season in 2013, marking the first season since 1909 that the Tigers won three consecutive regular season titles. The Tigers lost the 2013 ALCS to the eventual champions Boston Red Sox in six games, which was also Jim Leyland's final season as manager. In 2014, under new manager Brad Ausmus, they won their fourth-straight division title, but lost the ALDS to the Baltimore Orioles. The Tigers soon fell into rebuilding mode for the next several seasons, bottoming out with a 47–114 mark in 2019. Miguel Cabrera, the last Tigers player remaining from the 2012 team, retired after the 2023 season. The Tigers would not make the postseason again until the following season, in 2024.

In 2017, the two teams continued to be linked together, as they finished with the worst two records in Major League Baseball that season.

2012 Detroit Tigers co-aces Justin Verlander and Max Scherzer faced off in the World Series seven years later in 2019. Scherzer, then with the Washington Nationals, bested Verlander's Houston Astros in seven games, although they never pitched against each other. Mid-rotation starter Anibal Sanchez also pitched in the 2019 World Series for the Nationals. Verlander did win a World Series ring with the Astros two years earlier, and added a second in 2022. Rick Porcello, the Tigers fourth starter in 2012, later won a World Series with the 2018 Boston Red Sox. Drew Smyly, who pitched out of the bullpen for two games in the World Series but served as a fifth starter during the regular season prior to Sanchez's acquisition, later won a World Series for the 2021 Atlanta Braves. In terms of position players, Quintin Berry later won a World Series, serving primarily as a pinch-runner for the 2013 Red Sox, who defeated the Cardinals in the Fall Classic in six games.

Verlander and Scherzer were briefly re-united in 2023 when Verlander signed a record free-agent contract with the New York Mets. There had been rumors in Detroit that the two aces did not get along, but the rumors were never confirmed or denied. Verlander entered 2023 at age 40, while Scherzer would turn 38 in July, making them two of the oldest pitchers to ever start together in a rotation. At a combined $86.6 M, they were also the two most expensive pitchers to ever head a rotation, as well. The reunion would not last, however, and the Mets traded both Scherzer and Verlander to in-state rivals Texas Rangers and Houston Astros respectively, after struggling to begin the season. Ironically, both the Astros and Rangers met in the 2023 ALCS, and like in the 2019 World Series, neither pitcher opposed each other in a game. Ultimately, Scherzer's Rangers bested Verlander's Astros in seven games, again with the road team winning every game. At the end of his career, Verlander later pitched for the San Francisco Giants.

This was the last World Series to feature AL and NL Most Valuable Players for the regular season until the 2024 World Series, which featured AL MVP Aaron Judge and NL MVP Shohei Ohtani. In addition, this was the last World Series sweep.

== See also ==
- 2012 Asia Series
- 2012 Japan Series
- 2012 Korean Series
- List of World Series sweeps
