= List of Baseball Tonight personalities =

== Current ==
Position	Name	Tenure	Notes
Hosts	Kevin Connors	2022–present	Lead Host
Analysts	Jessica Mendoza	2014–present	
Analysts	Eduardo Pérez	2007–2011; 2014–present	Head co-Analyst on Sunday Night Baseball
Analysts	Chris Singleton	2008–present	
Analysts	Doug Glanville	2010–2017; 2019–present	
Analysts	Xavier Scruggs	2021–present	
MLB Insiders	Tim Kurkjian	1998–present	
MLB Insiders	Buster Olney	2003–present	
MLB Insiders	Keith Law	2013–present	
MLB Insiders	Jeff Passan	2019–present	

- Indicates part of the lead team that appears on the Sunday version (which serves as the pregame show to Sunday Night Baseball).

== Notable former on-air staff ==
Position	Name	Tenure	Current Status
Hosts	Rich Eisen	1996–2002	Lead host for NFL Network
Hosts	Steve Berthiaume	2004–2005 and 2007–2012	Play-by-play for the Arizona Diamondbacks on Dbackstv
Hosts	Brian Kenny	2003	MLB Network; play by play boxing announcer for DAZN; formerly hosted The Hot List on ESPNEWS from 2003–2006
Hosts	Dave Marash	1990	
Hosts	Gary Miller	1990–1995	Sports anchor for WKRC in Cincinnati
Hosts	Chris Myers	1991–1995	Play-by-play/Reporter for Fox Sports
Hosts	Bill Pidto	1993–2008	Co-host of Mad Dog Radio on Sirius XM Radio, NHL on Versus
Hosts	Karl Ravech	1996–2022	
Hosts	Scott Reiss	2006–2008	Sports Director for KRON-TV in San Francisco, California
Hosts	John Saunders	1990–1993	Died on August 10, 2016
Hosts	Adnan Virk	2013–2018	DAZN and MLB Network host
Analysts	Manny Acta	2013–2015	Third base coach with the Seattle Mariners
Analysts	Dusty Baker	2007	Front office with San Francisco Giants
Analysts	Aaron Boone	2010–2017	Manager of the New York Yankees
Analysts	Larry Bowa	2005	Senior Advisor to the General Manager for the Philadelphia Phillies
Analysts	Jim Bowden	2012–2017	CBS Sports HQ insider and SiriusXM host
Analysts	Dallas Braden	2014–2017	TV Analyst for select games with the Oakland Athletics on NBC Sports California
Analysts	Jeff Brantley	2002–2006	Analyst for the Cincinnati Reds on television and radio
Analysts	Dave Campbell	1990–2004	
Analysts	Alex Cora	2013–2016	Manager of the Boston Red Sox
Analysts	Rob Dibble	1998–2004	former analyst for the Washington Nationals on MASN; also hosts show on XM Radio with Kevin Kennedy
Analysts	Terry Francona	2012	Manager of Cincinnati Reds
Analysts	Nomar Garciaparra	2010–2013	Los Angeles Dodgers TV commentator
Analysts	Orel Hershiser	2006–2013	Los Angeles Dodgers TV broadcaster
Analysts	Ryan Howard	2019	
Analysts	Ray Knight	1998–2003	Former studio analyst for the Washington Nationals on MASN
Analysts	John Kruk	2004–2012; 2015–2016	Philadelphia Phillies TV commentator
Analysts	Barry Larkin	2011–2014	
Analysts	Tino Martinez	2006	
Analysts	Brian McRae	2000–2005	
Analysts	Mark Mulder	2011–2015	
Analysts	Steve Phillips	2005–2009	Retired
Analysts	Harold Reynolds	1996–2006	Commentator on MLB.com, TBS, MLB Network, and SportsNet New York.
Analysts	J. P. Ricciardi	2010	Special Assistant to the General Manager for the New York Mets
Analysts	Curt Schilling	2010–2016	
Analysts	Buck Showalter	2001–2002 (lead analyst), 2008–2010	Retired
Analysts	Rick Sutcliffe	2002–2003; 2012–2020	Head Analyst on Wednesday Night Baseball
Analysts	Mark Teixeira	2017–2020	
Analysts	Bobby Valentine	2003; 2009–2011	Director of Athletics at Sacred Heart University
Analysts	Eric Wedge	2014–2015	Retired
Analysts	Dave Winfield	2009–2012	
Analysts	Eric Young	2007–2009	Third base coach for the Los Angeles Angels
Analysts	Todd Walker	2017–2018	Studio analyst for NESN
Analysts	David Ross	2017–2019	Retired
Analysts	John Farrell	2018	Now at Fox Sports
Reporters	Peter Gammons	1990–2009	Commentator/Reporter on MLB.com, MLB Network, and NESN
Reporters	Jayson Stark	2000–2017	Sportswriter for The Athletic

- Indicates formerly part of Lead Team
