= Ted Griggs =

Ted Griggs (born October 24, 1960) was President, Group Leader and Strategic Production and Programming, NBC Regional Sports Network, overseeing CSN New England, CSN Philadelphia, TCN, and CSN Mid-Atlantic. Prior to that position, Griggs worked as President of Comcast SportsNet Bay Area and Comcast SportsNet California. Comcast SportsNet Bay Area is the regional sports network that broadcasts across Northern California and Nevada and televises live sporting events, including San Francisco Giants, Oakland Athletics, Golden State Warriors, San Jose Sharks, San Jose Earthquakes, and San Jose SaberCats. As president, Griggs oversees the daily operation of the network, including affiliate relations, advertising sales, programming, production, marketing and public relations.

Griggs joined the network in 1998. He served as vice president of production and operations, and, in 2007, became vice president and general manager. Also in 2007, under Griggs’ leadership, the network relocated to new, high-definition television studios in downtown San Francisco.

== Career ==
From 1982 to 1997, Griggs served as a producer, senior producer (1982–1994), vice president, and executive producer (1994–1997) at Golden Gate Productions. During his tenure at Golden Gate Productions, he worked on Sports Illustrated for Kids Olympics Special for NBC, World Cup Soccer Preview for ABC, MCI Downhill Replays for NBC and CBS, Stanford University Football, and World Cup Downhill Skiing. Griggs also worked on a total of eleven years of NFL Super Bowl Specials and twelve years of national and international Pre-Olympic programming.

At Trans World International, Griggs served as a senior producer, from 1997 to 1998, and produced several ski series, for multiple networks. In addition, he also directed several events for WNBC and ESPN. Griggs was a sports producer for San Francisco's KRON-TV’s Sports Final, from 1981 to 1982.

In 2021, Gravity Media appointed Griggs as managing director of its North American operation.

== Awards ==
The San Jose Mercury News ranked Griggs number one in "Bay Area’s 25 Most Powerful Sports People," in 2008. Since then, he has remained in the top five each year. In 2010, Griggs served as the executive producer for the show, "Out. The Glenn Burke Story," which explored the life of the first openly gay Major League Baseball player. The show earned a nomination for Outstanding Documentary at the national GLAAD (Gay & Lesbian Alliance Against Defamation) Media Awards, as well as a nomination from the Northern California Emmy Awards.

While Griggs served as vice president, Comcast SportsNet Bay Area won a total of 60 local Emmy Awards and three Beacon Awards, cable television's award for public affairs excellence.

== Education and personal life ==
Griggs is a native of Hayward, California. His father was a car mechanic. Griggs graduated from Moreau Catholic High School, and attended California State University, East Bay where he majored in Biology and then Theatre Arts. He transferred to San Francisco State University where he became the news director of KSFS, the campus radio station. By his second semester at SF State he had become an intern at KRON-TV (San Francisco channel 4). He received his B.A., cum laude, in Radio & Television in 1984. He was a recipient of the Bob Brown Memorial Scholarship, which is given to the top student in Broadcast Journalism.

Griggs has been closely involved in social justice causes; he has developed and produced documentaries on the subjects of mental health, equity, alcoholism, and inclusion of youth in sports. Documentary titles include HeadStrong: Mental Health and Sports, ~~TOMBOY~~, Split End: The Curious Case of Warren Wells, and Fair Play: Youth Sports in America.

He currently lives in San Rafael, California with his wife, Amy. He has three adult children, Jace, Griffin, Sydney, and a grandson born in 2024. Griggs has served as president of the Novato Lacrosse Club, a non-profit that provides opportunities to youth to play lacrosse, as well as a board member to Coaching Corps, an organization that seeks to use sports and the power of coaches as vehicles for transformative change for youth in underserved communities
