= Joe Angel =

American sportscaster

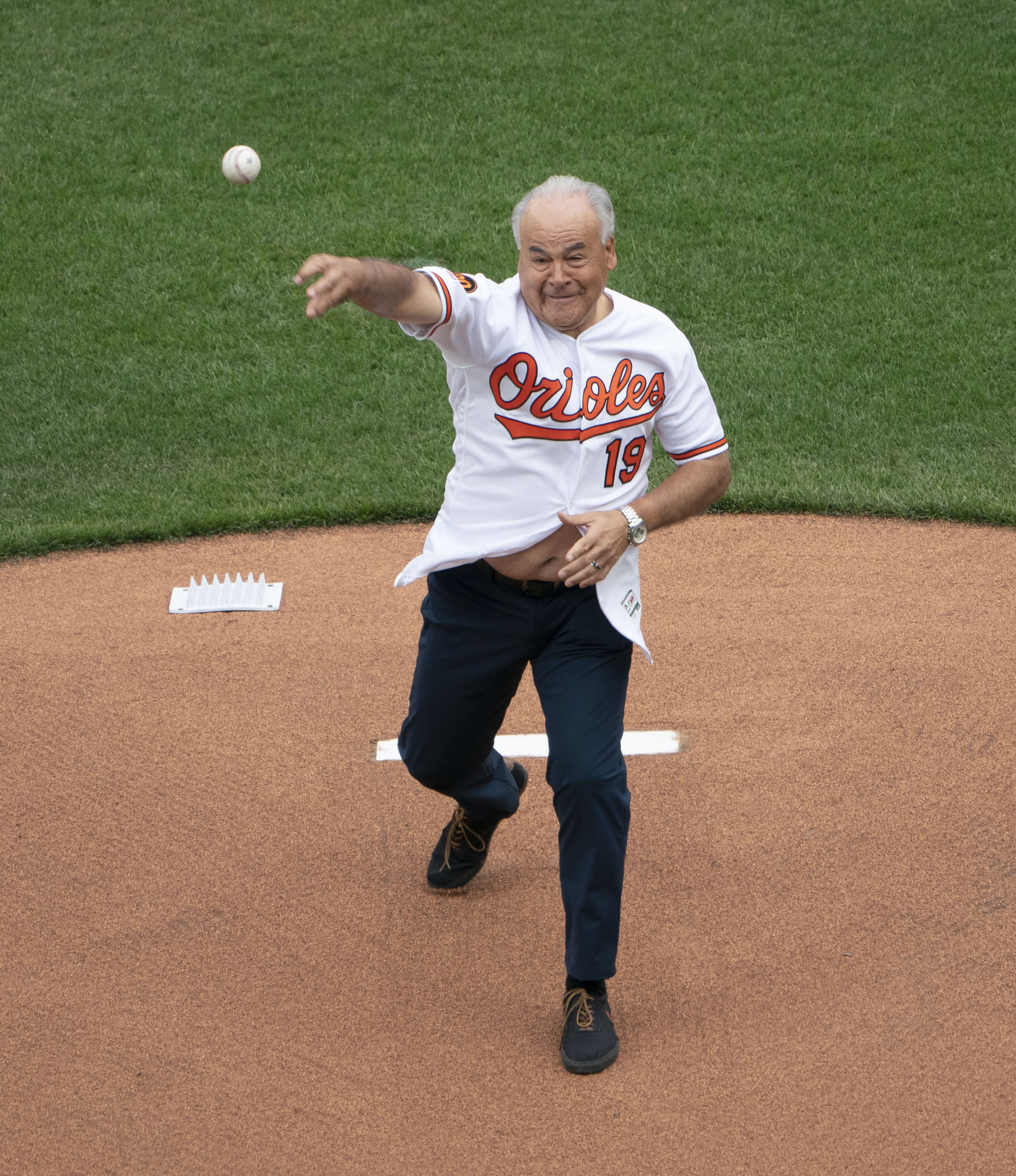
Angel throwing the ceremonial first pitch in 2019

Joseph Angel (born May 5, 1948) is a retired American sportscaster best known for calling play-by-play for several Major League Baseball teams, including 19 seasons with the Baltimore Orioles Radio Network. A native of Bogotá, Colombia, Angel is famous for his proper pronunciation of Latino players' names.

== Early life ==
As a teenager, Angel first emigrated with his family to Chicago, before eventually settling in the San Francisco Bay Area. In high school he played baseball and football (teaming with O. J. Simpson on the latter), and after graduating from City College of San Francisco began a career in broadcasting.

== Career ==
In the 1970s Angel broadcast for the San Francisco Giants (1977–78), as well as Stanford University football and University of San Francisco basketball. He also called game for the Minnesota Twins (1984–86), and Baltimore Orioles (1988–90, 1992).

In 1991, Angel teamed with John Sterling on WABC to call New York Yankees games, replacing Jay Johnstone. While he signed a two-year contract, he left after one season.

In 1993, he left the Orioles to become the Florida Marlins' first radio voice. Angel was behind the microphone for the Marlins' first World Series championship in 1997, which was the same year he took over the television broadcast as well, a position he would hold until 2000. After two years with ESPN (2000–01), Angel returned to the Giants in 2002 (teaming with former Orioles partner Jon Miller); and in 2004 he began a second tenure with the Orioles. In his career, he also broadcast the World Series two times as a broadcaster.

On February 14, 2019, Joe Angel announced his retirement.

== Personal life ==
Angel lives in El Dorado Hills, California with his wife Antoinette. He has three grown children: Tony, Natalie and Jonathan. Angel's son, Jonathan, was one of the stars of the teen sitcom Saved by the Bell: The New Class.

== Signature calls ==
- Angel would end every Marlins win with "And the Marlins are in: the Wiiiiiiin Column!" He would later end Orioles wins with the same call.
- He also refers to statistics following an Orioles win as the "lovely totals," while following an O's loss says the "not so lovely totals."
- He also has 2 notable home run calls, "Hasta la vista pelota!" as well as "Wave that baby bye-bye (player's name)!"
- His most famous call came in Game 7 of the 1997 World Series as Edgar Renteria singled off of Charles Nagy: "A five-year old child has become king!"
