= Scott Reiss =

American broadcast journalist

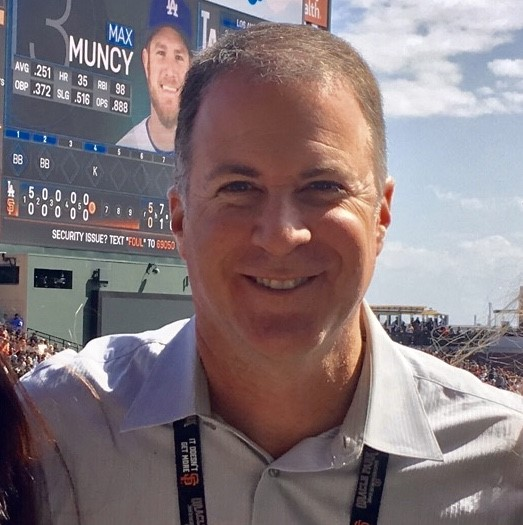
Scott Reiss

Scott Reiss is a three-time Emmy Award-winning American sportscaster who is the Sports Director at KRON-TV in San Francisco, California. He was previously the Sports Director for the CBS affiliate KCTV in Kansas City, Missouri. He was also the voice of Stanford University athletics for 10 years, handling play-by-play duties for Stanford Cardinal football and basketball. He has also worked as a sports anchor/reporter at KTVU, the Fox affiliate in the Bay Area.

Reiss worked for Comcast SportsNet Bay Area and Comcast SportsNet California, where he hosted SportsNet Central, as well as pre- and post-game shows for the San Francisco Giants, Oakland Athletics, Golden State Warriors, and San Jose Sharks. Prior to that, he was an anchor at ESPN, where he hosted shows including College GameNight, SportsCenter, Baseball Tonight, and ESPNEWS. In addition, he was a fill-in host for both College Football Live and NFL Live. He also hosted ESPN Radio College Gameday with analysts Todd McShay and Trevor Matich. Before joining ESPN, Reiss worked as a sports/news anchor and reporter at WUTR-TV in Utica, New York from 1995 to 1997 and sports director at KCOY-TV in Santa Maria, California from 1997 to 2000.

Reiss is the author of the Amazon best-seller, Where They Were Then: Sportscasters, which features first-person stories from nationally renowned sports broadcasters about their experiences breaking into the industry. Contributors to the book include Scott Van Pelt, Kenny Mayne, Trey Wingo, Heidi Watney, Jaymee Sire, Andy Katz, Dari Nowkhah, John Buccigross, Kevin Corke, Bill Pidto, Steve Bunin, Stan Verrett, Neil Everett, and Dave Flemming.

Reiss was born in Chicago and raised in Los Angeles. He is a graduate of Stanford University with a bachelor's degree in communications in 1993 and a master's degree in sociology in 1994.
