= GiantsVision =

Pay-per-view service for San Francisco Giants baseball games

- Country: United States
- Broadcast area: San Francisco Bay Area
- Network: Pay-per-view

Programming
- Language(s): English
- Picture format: 480i (SDTV)

Ownership
- Owner: Bay Area Interconnect

History
- Launched: 1986; 39 years ago
- Closed: 1989; 36 years ago
- Replaced by: SportsChannel Bay Area

GiantsVision was a pay-per-view television service for Major League Baseball games featuring the San Francisco Giants. GiantsVision was in operation for four seasons (1986–1989). Prior to this, the team's only local television outlet was KTVU, which had been broadcasting Giants games since 1961.

== Background ==
GiantsVision was managed by San Jose-based Bay Area Interconnect. It was headed by Robert Hartzell and Mike Shapiro. Subscription costs began at $5.95 per game, with a full 45-game package available for $154. GiantsVision garnered an average viewership of 22,000 per game through the first two months of the 1988 season.

GiantsVision was shut down at the conclusion of the 1989 season when it was purchased by SportsChannel and floated as SportsChannel Bay Area after the merger. By 1990, at least 105 San Francisco Giants games had been televised, far more than the approximately 55 games that GiantsVision offered.

== Commentators ==
Joe Morgan, Duane Kuiper, and Phil Stone were the principal announcers for GiantsVision. Kuiper's brother, Jeff, was the producer of the broadcasts. David Koppett produced features for GiantsVision and later SportsChannel telecasts of Giants games. He also served as associate producer and graphics operator on Giants telecasts.
