= Glen Kuiper =

American baseball broadcaster (born 1963)

- Sportscaster
- Born: May 20, 1963 (age 63); Racine, Wisconsin, U.S.

Teams
- As Broadcaster: Oakland Athletics (2006–2023); San Francisco Giants (2026–present)

Glen Alan Kuiper (born May 20, 1963) is an American sportscaster. He is best known for having served as the primary play-by-play announcer for the Oakland Athletics of Major League Baseball for nearly two decades (2006–2023), and was also an occasional announcer for the Athletics Radio Network. He is currently part of the San Francisco Giants broadcast team.

== Career ==
A native of Racine, Wisconsin, Kuiper was drafted out of community college by the Cincinnati Reds in the 10th round (243rd overall) of the 1982 amateur entry draft. He turned it down and continued his education. Kuiper later attended University of New Orleans before spending two years as an infielder (primarily at second base) playing minor league baseball with the Spokane Indians and Erie Cardinals. He moved to the Bay Area in the late 1980s and graduated from San Francisco State University with a bachelor's degree in broadcasting.

Kuiper first started appearing on A's TV broadcasts in 2004, and for the first two years, served as an on-field correspondent and fill-in announcer. He became the primary announcer in 2006. Kuiper was occasionally the TV play-by-play announcer of A's nationally televised games on Fox. From 1996 until 2000 Kuiper hosted Giants Lite and A's Lite on SportsChannel Pacific and later FSN Bay Area. The programs were 30-minute condensed highlight shows of the games and gave a synopsis of games that had not been televised.

In addition to baseball, he was a sideline reporter for select NFL telecasts for Fox as well as the San Jose Sharks. Kuiper also handled various collegiate assignments for NBC Sports Bay Area and the Golden State Warriors of the NBA.

=== Suspension and termination ===
On May 5, 2023, during a pre-game broadcast on NBC Sports California for a game between the A's and the Kansas City Royals, Kuiper was enthusiastically discussing what he and broadcast partner Dallas Braden had done earlier in the day in Kansas City, which included a visit to the Negro Leagues Baseball Museum. Kuiper – referring to the museum, which is commonly referred to as the Negro League Museum – appeared to misspeak and instead said the words "Nigger League Museum". Upon returning from a commercial break at the top of the sixth inning, Kuiper apologized for the remarks, saying, "A little bit earlier in the show, I said something, didn't come out quite the way I wanted it to, and I just wanted to apologize if it sounded different than I meant it to be said. I just wanted to apologize for that." Following the game, the A's issued a statement on Twitter denouncing Kuiper's remarks, saying, "The language used by Glen Kuiper during today's pregame broadcast is unacceptable. The Oakland Athletics do not condone such language. We are working to address the situation."

On May 22, 2023, NBC Sports California announced that Kuiper would no longer be working for the network, having been terminated for the incident following an internal investigation. Kuiper released his own statement the evening of his firing, saying he "will always have a hard time understanding how one mistake in a 20-year broadcasting career is cause for termination... ."

=== Return to broadcasting ===
On February 25, 2026, it was reported that Kuiper would serve as a fill-in on radio broadcasts for the San Francisco Giants. On April 28, Kuiper returned to the broadcasting booth for the first time since May 5, 2023, as part of the radio broadcast for San Francisco's matchup against the Philadelphia Phillies.

== Personal life ==
Kuiper is the younger brother of Duane Kuiper, a former Major League player and current broadcaster for the San Francisco Giants. Kuiper resides in Danville, California, with his wife, Amanda, and two children.
