= Dave Flemming =

American sportscaster (born 1976)

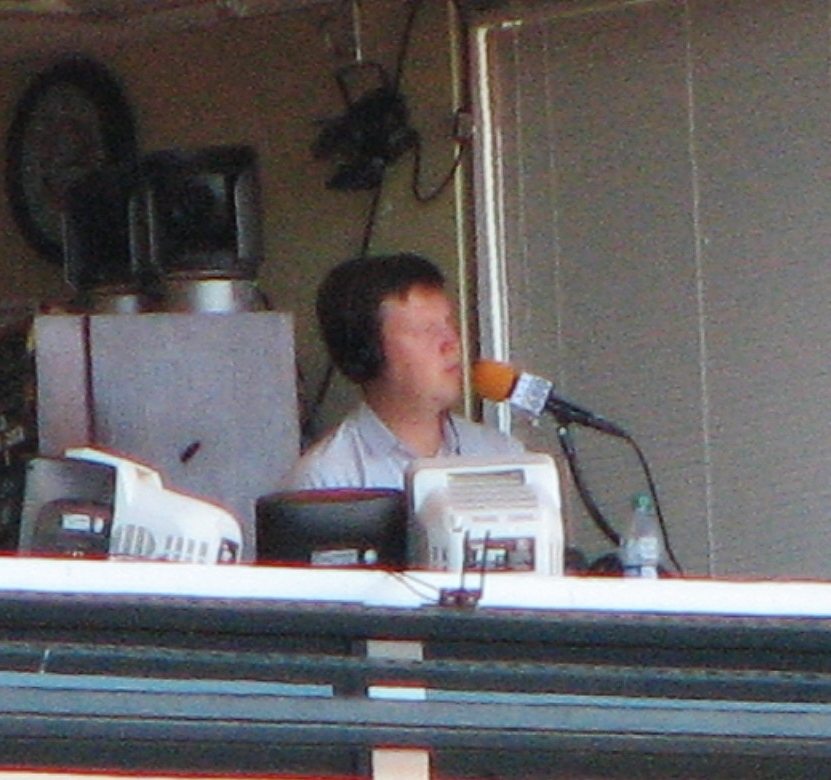
- Flemming in a booth 2013

San Francisco Giants
- Broadcaster
- Born: May 31, 1976 (age 50); Alexandria, Virginia, U.S.

Teams
- As broadcaster: Visalia Oaks (2000); Pawtucket Red Sox (2001–03); San Francisco Giants (2003–present); ESPN (2010–2026); NBC Sports (2026–present)

David Braxton Flemming (born May 31, 1976) is an American sportscaster who has been a play-by-play announcer for the San Francisco Giants of Major League Baseball since the 2003 season. Flemming also called college football, college basketball, major league baseball, and golf on ESPN, as well as the World Series, MLB All-Star Game and World Baseball Classic for MLB International.

Flemming grew up in Alexandria, Virginia, listening to current Giants partner Jon Miller when he was calling Baltimore Orioles games. In 2004, Flemming began his first full year as an announcer for the team, working with Miller, Duane Kuiper and Mike Krukow on San Francisco station KNBR and the Giants Radio Network. Since then, he has split time between television on NBC Sports Bay Area and radio on KNBR.

== Early life and career ==
After graduating from St. Stephen's & St. Agnes School in 1994, Flemming received bachelor's and master's degrees in classics from Stanford University as well a master's degree in broadcast journalism from the S.I. Newhouse School of Communications at Syracuse University. While he was at Stanford, Flemming broadcast Stanford Cardinal baseball, men's and women's basketball, and football and served as sports director at KZSU. In 2000, he broadcast play-by-play for the Visalia Oaks and served as the assistant general manager, before moving on to the Pawtucket Red Sox.

Flemming called games for three seasons on the eight-station PawSox Radio Network. His rise in the baseball broadcasting industry was fast, as he went from the Class-A ball (Visalia) in 2000 all the way up to Triple-A from 2001 to 2003 (Pawtucket) and then finally with the Giants.

== Career with the San Francisco Giants ==
In twenty seasons calling Giants games, Flemming called many significant on-air moments.

On April 27, 2003, in his second ever major league broadcast, working as a fill-in for Jon Miller, Flemming broadcast the Phillies' Kevin Millwood's no-hitter against the Giants. In some ways it was an indication of the moments to come.

Barry Bonds provided several of those. On May 28, 2006, Flemming called Barry Bonds' 715th home run, passing Babe Ruth for second place on the all-time home run list. However, as he was making the call, his microphone went dead. Flemming, unaware of the problem, continued to make the call, but all listeners heard was about ten seconds of dead air. Only Duane Kuiper's call on Fox Sports Net's broadcast was sent to the Hall of Fame. On September 23 of the same year, during Flemming's third-inning call of a game against the Milwaukee Brewers at Miller Park, Bonds hit a home run off left-hander Chris Capuano. This was Bonds' 734th career homer (26th for the season), which broke Hank Aaron's record for National League home runs. (Aaron hit his last 21 homers as an American League player.) Eventually on August 4, 2007, Flemming was able to call Bonds' record-tying 755th home run in San Diego on the radio against the San Diego Padres.

On July 14, 2006, for a Friday night home game, Flemming made his television broadcast debut for the Giants. Since then, he has appeared regularly on both NBC Sports Bay Area and KNTV during the baseball season.

Other milestone broadcasts Flemming contributed to include the calls of Greg Maddux and Randy Johnson's 300th pitching victories. Including the Milwood game on his debut weekend, Flemming has broadcast seven MLB no-hitters.

On November 1, 2010, during the seventh inning in Game 5 of the World Series at Rangers Ballpark, Flemming made the winning home run call that eventually sealed the Giants' win, and thus the World Series.

On June 13, 2012, Flemming made the radio call of the final out of Matt Cain's perfect game, the first in the history of the Giants. In 2013 Flemming (along with Kuiper and Miller) won an Emmy for his coverage of the perfect game.

Later that season, on October 28, 2012, Flemming made the call for the final out of the 2012 World Series. Flemming was again a part of the broadcasts for the 2014 postseason, and the Giants' third World Series win of the decade. In his time in San Francisco, he has won three Northern California Emmys for sports play-by-play.

== Stanford football and basketball ==
Starting in 2007, Flemming began broadcasting Stanford Cardinal football and basketball. He spent three years as the voice of Stanford basketball on the radio, and six years in that capacity with Stanford football before leaving the Stanford broadcasts to concentrate on his ESPN work.

The period Flemming served as the voice of Stanford football coincided with perhaps the most successful stretch in the school's football history. Flemming's first broadcast on the Stanford radio network was the epic upset of #1 ranked USC on October 6, 2007. Over the next six seasons, Flemming was behind the microphone for the record performances of Toby Gerhart and Andrew Luck, and for three BCS bowl appearances, including a Rose Bowl victory over Wisconsin on January 1, 2013.

== National work ==
Flemming became a regular College Basketball on ESPN announcer in 2010, after having called a couple of games for the network the previous season. He has since covered the Big 10, the Big 12, the Pac 12, and the WCC for ESPN college basketball, teaming with Dan Dakich, Sean Farnham, Fran Fraschilla, and many other analysts. In recent years Flemming and Farnham have frequently followed Gonzaga and have documented that program's rise to the top of the college basketball world.

He has also called baseball for ESPN and ESPN Radio, including postseason Division Series games from 2013 to 2019. He worked a season calling college football games for the Pac-12 Network in 2012 before shifting over to College Football on ESPN in 2013. Also in 2013, Flemming began calling NBA games on ESPN Radio and contributing to the Little League World Series coverage on ESPN and ABC. His LLWS work continued for seven years. In 2015, Flemming began calling NFL games for ESPN Radio as well. In 2016, he began calling select Monday Night Baseball games for ESPN, as well as College Football Thursday Primetime games. He has also served a hole announcer for ESPN golf coverage, including the Masters and PGA Championship tournaments.

In 2022, Flemming called the AL Wild Card series between the Seattle Mariners and Toronto Blue Jays with Jessica Mendoza, Tim Kurkjian and Coley Harvey. Since 2022, Flemming has called play-by-play for the World Series for MLB International; he teamed with Dan Plesac in 2022, and has been paired with Ryan Spilborghs from 2023.

In May 2026, he joined NBC Sports to call games for their MLB Sunday Leadoff package and College Football.

== Personal life ==
Flemming and his wife, Jessica, live in San Francisco with their identical twin daughters Katie and Carter and their son David Henry.

Flemming's brother, Will Flemming, is a play-by-play announcer for the Boston Red Sox Radio Network.

Flemming is a descendant of Carter Braxton, a signer of the United States Declaration of Independence.
