= Coaching Corps =

- Founded: 2002
- Type: Non-profit
- Location: 310 8th Street, Suite 300, Oakland, CA 94607
- Services: Recruit and Train volunteer coaches to benefit kids living in underserved communities through sports and service
- Fields: Health, Education, Social Inclusion
- Key people: Walter A. Haas Jr., Founder
- Website: http://www.coachingcorps.org

Coaching Corps recruits and trains volunteers from college campuses, local communities and civic organizations who are as passionate about kids as they are about sports. Kids in low-income communities deserve the same benefit from youth sports as middle-class and affluent kids - confidence, self-reliance and teamwork. Coaching Corps exists in over 43 university campuses across America and has provided 1,600 volunteer coaches to serve over 15,000 kids annually.

Coaching Corps' mission statement is "We improve the health, educational and social outcomes for kids living in struggling communities through the power of service and sports." Volunteers through Coaching Corps build skills through peer coaching and training support and typically provide 1–6 hours per week of service. Coaching Corps sports programs range from traditional sports such as basketball, baseball, soccer, and tennis as well as non-traditional ones.

== General program ==
Coaching Corp recruits volunteers on university campuses that have shown interest in volunteering in low-income communities. Volunteers are required to commit to 1–4 hours a week for at least one season. These volunteers then coach children in a variety of sports and activities in order to promote physical wellness and a positive outlook.

=== Take your team to college day ===
"Take Your Team to College Day" is a university sponsored event that takes 15-20 kids from Coaching Corps programs on a college campus tour, most notably UCLA, Stanford, UC Berkeley, and USC. The primary goal of this event is to inspire the children to think about their futures and higher education.

== Notable supporters ==
- Tony La Russa
- Andrew Luck
- Walter Haas Jr.
- Cal Athletics
- Stanford Athletics
- Matt Kemp

== Facts and figures ==
Information and statistics about Coaching Corps:

=== Facts ===
- Coaching Corps has served nearly 50,000 kids through 2014.
- Kids have had over 700,000 hours of face-to-face time with trained coaches.
- There are Coaching Corps chapters across the country that are actively recruiting.
- To date, nearly 3,000 coaches have been recruited and partnered with after school programs.

=== Figures ===
Age demographics of youth served:

- 75% are in elementary school
- 24% are in middle school
- 1% are in high school
- 65% are male
- 35% are female

Ethnicity of youth served:

- African-American - 55%
- Caucasian - 5%
- Hispanic - 15%
- Other - 25%

Household income of Coaching Corps communities:

- 20,000-39,000 - 29%
- 40,000-59,000 - 31%
- 60,000-79,000 - 26%
- 80,000+ - 14%

== Coaching Corps university chapters ==
Coaching Corps has active chapters at the following universities:

=== Georgia ===
- Emory University

=== California ===
- California State University Northridge
- San Diego State University
- San Francisco State University
- Stanford University
- University of California, Berkeley
- University of California, Los Angeles
- University of California, Santa Cruz
- University of San Diego
- University of Southern California
