= Duane Kuiper =

American baseball player and broadcaster (born 1950)

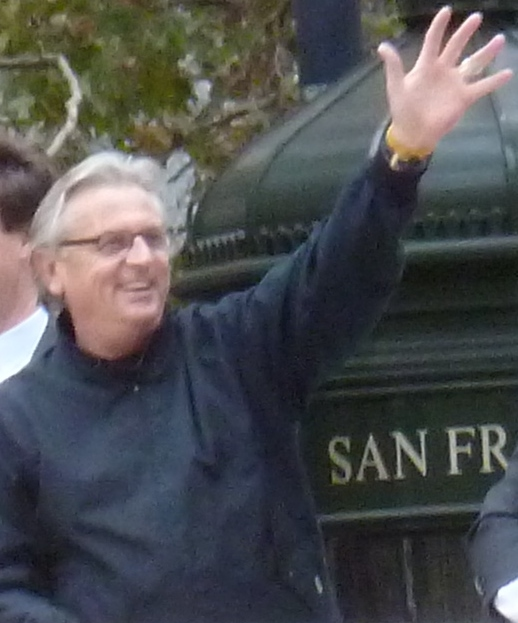
- Kuiper at the 2012 World Series victory parade
- Second baseman
- Born: June 19, 1950 (age 76); Racine, Wisconsin, U.S.
- Batted: Left Threw: Right

MLB debut
- September 9, 1974, for the Cleveland Indians

Last MLB appearance
- June 27, 1985, for the San Francisco Giants

MLB statistics
- Batting average: .271
- Home runs: 1
- Hits: 971
- Runs batted in: 263
- Stats at Baseball Reference

Teams
- Cleveland Indians (1974–1981); San Francisco Giants (1982–1985)

Duane Eugene Kuiper (/ˈkaɪpər/ KYPE-ər; born June 19, 1950), nicknamed "Kuip", is an American sportscaster and former professional baseball player. As a player, he was a second baseman for the Cleveland Indians and San Francisco Giants of Major League Baseball (MLB). Except for one year, Kuiper has been a television and radio broadcaster for the Giants since 1986, and is one half of the popular "Kruk and Kuip" duo alongside his friend and former teammate Mike Krukow. He briefly left the Giants in 1993 to work for the expansion Colorado Rockies, but returned in 1994.

== Early life ==
Duane Eugene Kuiper was born on June 19, 1950, in Racine, Wisconsin. Kuiper, his two brothers, and one sister, grew up on a 300-acre (120 ha) farm in Sturtevant, Wisconsin, near Racine. He played baseball at Jerome I. Case High School in Racine, Wisconsin. He is the older brother of sports broadcaster, Glen Kuiper.

== College career ==
Kuiper is a graduate of Southern Illinois University in Carbondale, Illinois, where he was a member of the Tau Kappa Epsilon fraternity. His roommate was Dan Radison, a long-time minor and major league coach.

== Professional career ==
=== Drafts and minor leagues ===
Kuiper was drafted by the New York Yankees out of Jerome I. Case High School in the twelfth round of the 1968 Major League Baseball draft, but chose instead to attend Indian Hills Community College. He was drafted by the Seattle Pilots, Chicago White Sox and Cincinnati Reds while attending Indian Hills, but did not sign with any of these clubs. After a season at Southern Illinois University, he was drafted by the Boston Red Sox in the fourth round of the 1971 June Secondary Amateur Draft, but again did not sign. It wasn't until graduating from Southern Illinois that Kuiper finally said yes to the Cleveland Indians, who drafted him in the first round of the 1972 January Secondary Amateur Draft.

Kuiper spent three seasons in the Indians' farm system, batting .295 with six home runs and 148 runs batted in (RBIs) before receiving a September call-up in 1974.

=== Cleveland Indians (1974–1981) ===
Kuiper made his major league debut on September 9 as a late inning defensive replacement for Jack Brohamer, and grounded into a double play in his only at-bat. However, he fared far better in his remaining plate appearances that season, collecting nine singles, two doubles, two walks and four RBIs in 24 plate appearances.

Though Kuiper spent time with the triple-A Oklahoma City 89ers in 1975, he spent most of the season in the majors, splitting time with Brohamer at second base, and batting second in manager Frank Robinson's batting order. Following the season, the Indians dealt Brohamer to the White Sox, clearing a spot for Kuiper to play every day.

Primarily a slap hitter, Kuiper maintained a decent batting average (lifetime .271) while proving to be an above average defender, leading American League second basemen in fielding percentage in 1976 and 1979. He hit his only career home run against Chicago White Sox pitcher Steve Stone on August 29, 1977. Kuiper holds the MLB record for most career at-bats with only one home run in the live-ball era. In interviews for a video, Super Duper Baseball Bloopers, Stone claimed that he wasn't properly warmed up for the game, with only seven minutes to warm up, because his manager didn't know the game was starting 12 minutes earlier than expected. Kuiper's counter-argument was, "Steve would like to tell you he wasn't loose. Well, he was loose enough to strike out the first batter of the game." Since the game in question was on national television, Kuiper's singular feat was captured on video. (Giants telecasts, for which Kuiper is currently an announcer, will run the highlight from time to time to poke fun at him. On April 25, 2014, the Giants held "Duane Kuiper Home Run Bobblehead Night" for their game against the Indians.)

On May 30, 1977, Kuiper scored the only run for either team in Dennis Eckersley's no-hitter against the California Angels.

On July 27, 1978, playing against the Yankees at Yankee Stadium, Kuiper hit two bases-loaded triples. He is one of only three Major League players to accomplish this feat, the other two players being Elmer Valo (1949) and Bill Bruton (1959).

On May 15, 1981, Len Barker pitched a perfect game against the Toronto Blue Jays with Kuiper at second base. Kuiper fielded five ground balls to contribute to the effort. Shortly after Kuiper suffered a knee injury that caused him to miss most of the 1980 season, the Indians acquired Alan Bannister from the White Sox. The two platooned at second in 1981. He batted .257 with 14 RBI that season.

=== San Francisco Giants (1982–1985) ===
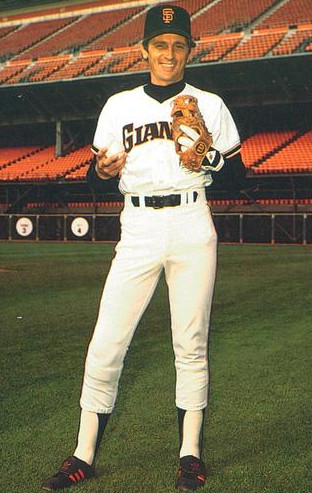
Kuiper with the San Francisco Giants

Kuiper was dealt from the Indians to the San Francisco Giants for pitcher Ed Whitson on November 15, 1981. He backed up Hall of famer Joe Morgan his first season in San Francisco, and batted .255 in three-plus seasons platooning at second for the Giants before being released by the club on June 28, 1985. Kuiper and future broadcast partner Mike Krukow were both on the Giants from 1983 to 1985, where they formed their friendship.

== Broadcasting career ==
Kuiper's broadcasting career began while still a player, hosting his own KNBR radio show from 1982 to 1985. After retiring from playing baseball, Kuiper provided commentary for the Giants from 1986 to 1992. With uncertainty over whether the Giants would move to Florida for the 1993 season, Kuiper left for a one-year stint with the expansion Colorado Rockies. Kuiper returned to broadcast for the Giants in 1994, where he has remained since.

Kuiper's call of Bonds' 715th home run to pass Babe Ruth is considered the historic call for that home run, as radio announcer Dave Flemming's microphone cut out at the exact moment the ball was hit. Kuiper made the TV call for Barry Bonds' historic 756th home run which broke Hank Aaron's record (although the historic call is that of KNBR radio announcer Jon Miller).

On November 1, 2010, Kuiper made the historic call for the final out of Game 5 of the 2010 World Series that resulted in the Giants' first title since 1954. On June 13, 2012, Kuiper called Matt Cain's perfect game.

While principally a television play-by-play announcer on NBC Sports Bay Area, Kuiper also shares radio play-by-play duties with Dave Flemming on KNBR when the Giants television broadcast is carried over-the-air on KNTV and Jon Miller handles the television play-by-play. He also fills in on the radio side when Flemming is unable to announce games due to his second job as an ESPN college football and basketball announcer. During Giants post-season play, Kuiper and broadcast partner Mike Krukow move over to the radio side and call games with Miller and Flemming while the television broadcasts are handled by network sportscasters.

Kruk and Kuip can be heard in the Electronic Arts video games MVP Baseball 2003, MVP Baseball 2004, and MVP Baseball 2005. In December 2010, both Kuiper and Krukow signed six-year extensions to continue as Giants announcers.

Kuiper missed calling much of the 2021 season after a cancer diagnosis that required chemotherapy, but he returned to a limited schedule—all home games and 20 road games, called remotely from San Francisco—in the 2022 season.

On September 20, 2026, Kuiper released a statement through the Giants announcing that he had been diagnosed with throat cancer and had begun receiving treatment at Stanford Medicine. He noted that the diagnosis was unrelated to his 2021 health battle and expressed optimism about his treatment plan. Kuiper briefly stepped away from the booth during the final week of the 2026 regular season to undergo treatment, with plans to return to finish the season alongside long-time broadcast partner Mike Krukow, who was calling his final games prior to retirement. Despite Krukow's retirement, Kuiper stated he intended to continue broadcasting Giants games for the 2027 season.

=== Commentating style ===
According to an Aug. 21, 2019 story in Sports Broadcast Journal, Kuiper uses a deep baritone voice when a player swings and misses, when a dramatic play is made, and when he calls home runs.

Kuiper is noted for his distinctive calls beginning and ending each game: after the result of the first batter of the game, he says, "And that's how this game gets started"; when the ball game is over, Kuiper says, "And that's the ball game!" or "And this game is over!"

When Kuiper states the pitch count on a batter, he often calls "nothing" in lieu of calling "a ball" and the current number of strikes when the count is "no balls". Kuiper often uses the phrase "Got 'em!" when an out is recorded.

His trademark home run call is "He hits it high... hits it deep... it is (or this baby is) OUTTA HERE!" or "HIGH DRIVE... LEFT (or RIGHT/CENTER) FIELD... IT IS (sometimes: THIS BABY IS) OUTTA HERE!" Another popular home run saying, "THAT ONE'S HIGH, AND DEEP, AND... GONE! A HOME RUN!"

In April 2010, Kuiper coined a new slogan from a fan's sign for the SF Giants club: "Giants baseball... torture!" This slogan is used generally if the games are either tense, tight, or very close, in which the Giants have later won by a small margin.

== Personal life ==
Kuiper lives in Danville, California. He was married to Michelle Kuiper for 36 years before she died on February 20, 2022. Together, they had two children: a son, Cole, who is married to Rachel Jensen Kuiper, and a daughter, Dannon, who is married to Zack Rease. Kuiper has two granddaughters: Andy (born 2019) and Kit (born 2021).

Kuiper is just one in a family of baseball broadcasters, all working in the San Francisco Bay Area. His younger brother, Glen Kuiper, was the play-by-play announcer for the Oakland Athletics from 2006 to 2023, a job mirroring his older brother's a few miles across the bay. Their middle brother, Jeff, is a television producer for the Giants who produces Duane's broadcasts.

For many years, Kuiper would visit his family's farm in Sturtevant, Wisconsin whenever the Giants played the Brewers in Milwaukee. The farm continued to be owned by his father, Henry Kuiper, until the elder Kuiper sold it in 2018 so that the land could be redeveloped into a hospital complex. Henry Kuiper died in 2019 at age 95.

Achievements
Preceded by Bill Bruton	Two bases-loaded triples in a game July 27, 1978	Succeeded by current
