= Mike Krukow =

American baseball player and broadcaster (born 1952)

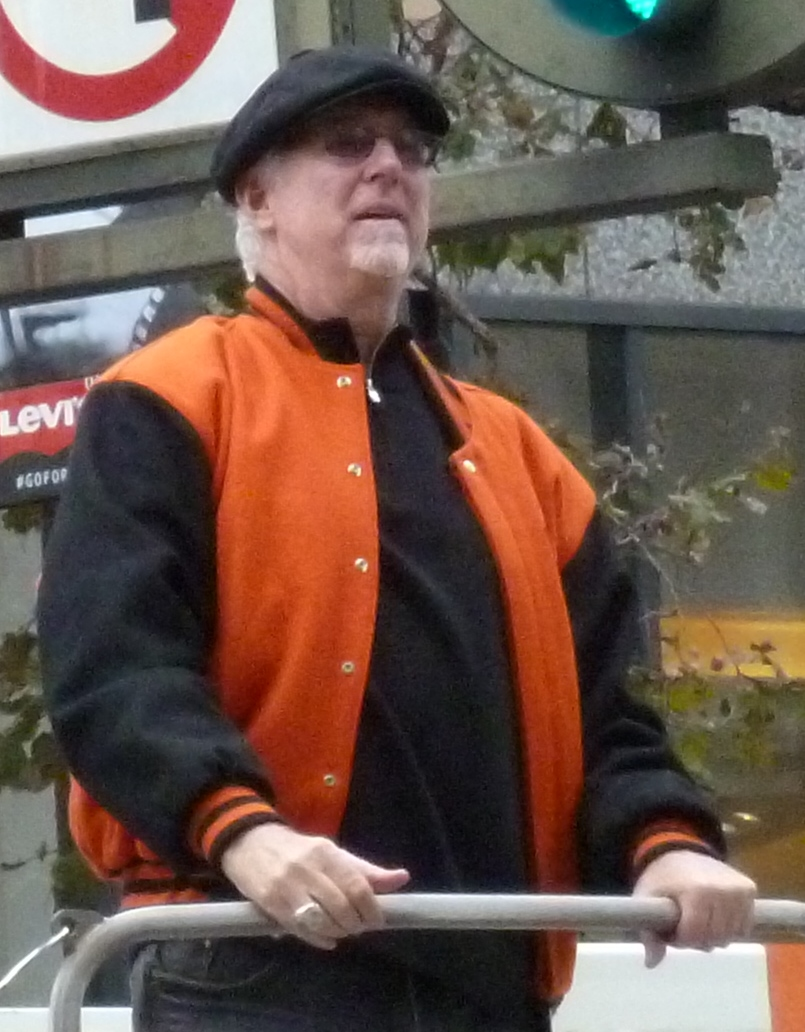
- Krukow at the 2012 World Series victory parade
- Pitcher
- Born: January 21, 1952 (age 74); Long Beach, California, U.S.
- Batted: Right Threw: Right

MLB debut
- September 6, 1976, for the Chicago Cubs

Last MLB appearance
- June 4, 1989, for the San Francisco Giants

MLB statistics
- Win–loss record: 124–117
- Earned run average: 3.90
- Strikeouts: 1,478
- Stats at Baseball Reference

Teams
- Chicago Cubs (1976–1981); Philadelphia Phillies (1982); San Francisco Giants (1983–1989)

Career highlights and awards
- All-Star (1986); San Francisco Giants Wall of Fame

Michael Edward Krukow (/ˈkrukoʊ/ KROO-koh; born January 21, 1952), nicknamed "Kruk", is an American former sportscaster and former professional baseball player. As a starting pitcher, he played in Major League Baseball (MLB) for the Chicago Cubs, Philadelphia Phillies, and San Francisco Giants. He has been a television and radio broadcaster for the Giants since 1990, and is one half of the popular "Kruk and Kuip" duo, alongside his friend and former teammate Duane Kuiper. He was an All-Star in 1986. Krukow retired at the end of the 2026 MLB season, having spent 36 years in the broadcast booth.

== Early life ==
Michael Edward Krukow was born on January 21, 1952, in Long Beach, California. Krukow attended San Gabriel High School in San Gabriel, California, where he excelled in baseball playing as a catcher. Krukow was a fan of the Los Angeles Dodgers, the Giants' archrival, and attended many games at Dodger Stadium with his father. He was drafted as a catcher by the California Angels in the 32nd round of the 1970 Major League Baseball draft, but did not sign.

== College career ==
Krukow became a pitcher and played college baseball for the Cal Poly Mustangs in San Luis Obispo, California. Though his collegiate eligibility was cut short, he still holds the school record for career earned run average at 1.94, and is tied for most shutouts in a season with five.

== Professional career ==
=== Draft, minor leagues, and Chicago Cubs (1976–1981) ===
The Chicago Cubs selected Krukow in the eighth round of the 1973 MLB draft. He first appeared for the Cubs in 1976, and joined the starting rotation in 1977; he would remain with the team for four more seasons. In 1979 he batted .314 (16 for 51), the ninth highest season batting average for a pitcher in the designated hitter era.

=== Philadelphia Phillies (1982) ===
He was traded from the Cubs to the Phillies for Keith Moreland, Dickie Noles and Dan Larson on December 8, 1981.

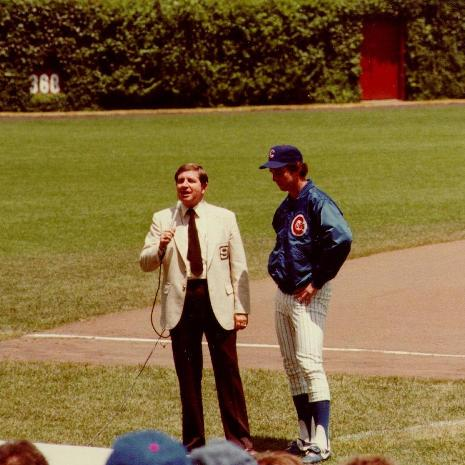
Krukow interviewed at Wrigley Field by Milo Hamilton in 1981

For the Phillies, the right-handed starter was second only to Steve Carlton in wins, posting a 13–11 record and an impressive 3.12 ERA.

=== San Francisco Giants (1983–1989) ===
He was dealt along with Mark Davis and minor-league outfielder C.L. Penigar from the Phillies to the Giants for Joe Morgan and Al Holland on December 14, 1982. The trade helped Philadelphia win the National League pennant in 1983, but it also gave San Francisco two pitching arms that would become a big part of the Giants' success in the late 1980s.

Although known as a starter, Krukow earned his only career save on August 31, 1984, pitching to just one batter (the Phillies' Sixto Lezcano), inducing a game-ending groundout, therefore preserving a 6–5 Giant victory.

Krukow's best campaign was in 1986 when he became the first Giants pitcher since Ron Bryant in 1973 to win at least 20 games in a season with a 20–9 record and a 3.05 ERA. Krukow finished third in that year's NL Cy Young Award behind Mike Scott and Fernando Valenzuela. Krukow was selected to the National League All-Star team that season. He received the Willie Mac Award in 1985 and 1986 for his spirit and leadership. In 1987, Krukow helped lead the Giants to their first division championship in 16 years.

Krukow's 17 no decisions were the most among MLB starting pitchers in 1987, as well as being the most ever by a Giants starter dating back to at least 1908. He made the only postseason appearance of his career in Game-4 of the 1987 National League Championship Series. Krukow was the winning pitcher in a nine-inning complete game, allowing two runs on nine hits, as the Giants beat the St. Louis Cardinals, 4–2. It was the Cardinals, however, that took the series in seven games to reach the World Series.

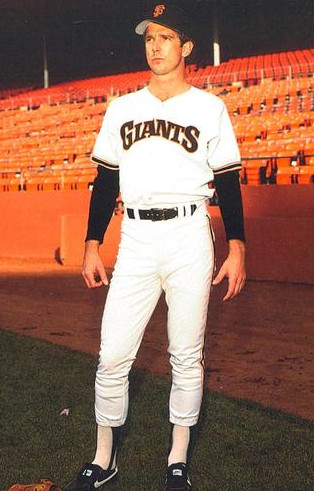
Krukow with the San Francisco Giants

Krukow went 4–3 with a 3.98 ERA during a 1989 campaign which was cut short on June 30 when he underwent arthroscopic surgery to repair a rotator cuff tear in his pitching shoulder after spending parts of three seasons on the injured list for what was believed to be bursitis. He was ninth in Giants franchise history with 66 wins and sixth with 802 strikeouts at the time of his retirement as an active player on March 19, 1990, due to recurring shoulder problems. Krukow posted a 124–117 record with a 3.90 ERA in 369 games during his 14-season MLB career.

== Broadcasting career ==
After his playing career, Krukow became a radio and television sportscaster. Krukow began broadcasting as an occasional color analyst for KNBR radio in 1990 and became a full-time broadcaster in 1994. He is a seven-time Emmy award winner. "Kruk," who was named as the starting right-handed pitcher to the 1980s Giants All-Decade Team in a vote by Bay Area media in 1999, is noted for his deep knowledge of the game and tremendous sense of humor. He is known for his detailed scouting reports on umpires' strike zones.

Part of the San Francisco Giants broadcasting team, Krukow is half of the duo dubbed "Kruk and Kuip," (pronounced "Kruke" and "Kipe") along with partner Duane Kuiper, a former Giants teammate. Krukow and Kuiper tape a game-day commentary ("Kruk and Kuip on baseball") for KNBR radio as part of the Giants' pre-game radio coverage. Notably, although Krukow was a pitcher and Kuiper was a position player, Krukow has five career home runs, four more than Kuiper (who managed only one in his career despite having over 3,000 at-bats).

Krukow has a few "Kruktionary" catchphrases, including: "Grab some pine, meat"; "Just another, ha ha ha ha, laugher!" (after a nail-biter win); and "I wanna get that!", the last of which is associated with a product endorsement.

On August 6, 2026, Krukow announced he would retire at the end of the season after 36 years in the broadcast booth. In a statement, Krukow thanked Giants fans for their loyalty, stating, "I have been so blessed to be able to stay in the game for as long as we have and it’s really made it impossible to feel sorry for myself that my career is coming to an end."

== Personal life ==
Until 2014, Krukow and his wife Jennifer resided in San Luis Obispo, California, but they moved to Reno, Nevada to be closer to their grandchildren though Krukow stays in San Francisco during the season. They have five adult children, Jarek, Baker, Tessa, Chase and Weston. Mike Krukow is a talented musician, and proficient in the guitar, the mandolin, the banjo, and the ukulele.

In July 2014, Krukow revealed he was suffering from inclusion body myositis (IBM). His condition was known to the Giants and many of his fellow broadcasters, but he kept the condition a secret from the general public until then. Krukow first noticed that he was having problems about 10 years earlier, when he had lost about 100 yards off his golf drive. According to sportswriter Steve Fainaru, Krukow "blew it off... for years", but "secretly feared he had amyotrophic lateral sclerosis, Lou Gehrig's disease". Finally, in 2011, he saw the Giants' team neurologist, who referred him to a neuromuscular specialist who in turn diagnosed him with IBM. The disease, which mainly affects the quadriceps and hand muscles, is not life-threatening, but required him to use a cane. Due to the progression of the disease, Krukow is currently using a motorized wheelchair and can no longer travel to away games. Because of increasing hand weakness that limits his ability to play stringed instruments, he has recently taken up the drums, which require a different set of muscular movements. In 2017, he announced that he would reduce his schedule to 120 games a season working road games only west of Denver, except for postseason games.

For the 2020 season, NBC Sports Bay Area announced that it would experiment with having Krukow call NL West road games remotely from their studios in San Francisco, while still having Kuiper travel to the game site. The "SplitKast" arrangement was rendered moot by the COVID-19 pandemic, as no MLB broadcasters were allowed to travel to road games. As a result, all games were called remotely from Oracle Park. NBC Sports retained this model for away games involving the pair during subsequent seasons, with an alternate commentary team handling other games.
