= Jon Miller =

American sportscaster (born 1951)

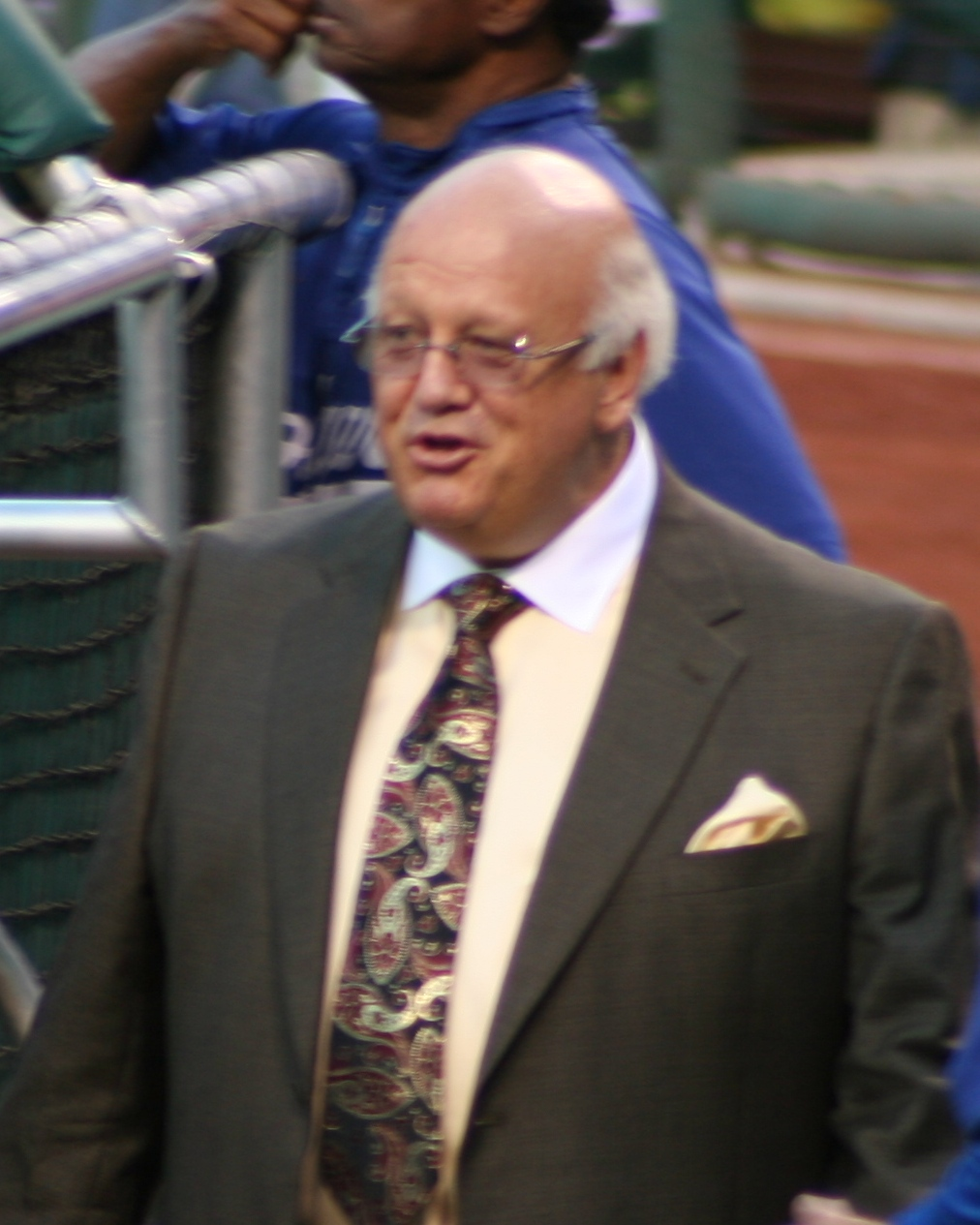
- Miller in 2008

San Francisco Giants
- Broadcaster
- Born: October 11, 1951 (age 75); Novato, California, U.S.

Teams
- As Broadcaster: Oakland Athletics (1974); Texas Rangers (1978–1979); Boston Red Sox (1980–1982); Baltimore Orioles (1983–1996); ESPN (1990–2010); San Francisco Giants (1997–present)

Career highlights and awards
- Ford C. Frick Award (2010); National Radio Hall of Fame (2014)

Jon Miller (born October 11, 1951) is an American sportscaster, known primarily for his broadcasts of Major League Baseball. Since 1997, he has been employed as a play-by-play announcer for the San Francisco Giants. He was also a baseball announcer for ESPN from 1990 to 2010. Miller received the Ford C. Frick Award from the National Baseball Hall of Fame in 2010.

== Early life ==
Jon Miller was born on Hamilton Air Force Base in Novato, California, and grew up in Hayward, listening to Giants announcers Russ Hodges and Lon Simmons on the radio. He attended his first baseball game in 1962, a 19–8 Giants' victory over the Los Angeles Dodgers at Candlestick Park. As a teenager, Miller played Strat-O-Matic and recorded his own play-by-play into a tape recorder, adding his own crowd noise, vendors, and commercials.

== Broadcasting career ==
=== Early work ===
After graduating from Hayward High School in 1969, Miller took broadcasting classes at the College of San Mateo. He began his broadcasting career at the college's FM radio station (KCSM-FM) and UHF/PBS TV station (KCSM-TV), which reached much of the Bay Area. His first baseball broadcasts were from CSM games. At age 20, Miller joined KFTY-TV in Santa Rosa to work as their sports director. During this period, he would sit in the press box at Candlestick Park and record play-by-play of an entire game on his tape recorder. Miller submitted one of these tapes to broadcaster Monte Moore, who helped Miller get his first baseball play-by play job in 1974, calling that year's World Series champion Oakland Athletics. Miller was dismissed by the Athletics following the 1974 season.

For a brief period in the 1970s, Miller broadcast for the California Golden Seals of the National Hockey League. He also spent the early part of his career announcing San Francisco Dons and Pacific Tigers men's college basketball (1976–1980), the Golden State Warriors (part-time, 1979–1982) and Washington Bullets (part-time, 1984–1985) of the NBA, and the original San Jose Earthquakes of the North American Soccer League. Jon Miller's first network exposure came in 1976, when he was selected by CBS-TV to broadcast the NASL Championship Game. From 1974 to 1976, Miller did play-by-play for the Washington Diplomats of the NASL. He also announced the Soccer Game of the Week for nationally syndicated TVS from 1977 to 1978.

Miller was hired by the Texas Rangers shortly before the 1978 season to replace the ill Dick Risenhoover after the Rangers were unable to lure Fred White from Kansas City. After two seasons with Texas (1978–79), he was hired by the Boston Red Sox (1980–82). "The lure of doing baseball in Boston was too much to pass up," Miller recalled.

=== Baltimore Orioles ===
Following the Baltimore Orioles' 1982 season, their longtime announcer Chuck Thompson moved from the WFBR radio booth to do television broadcasts full-time, and WFBR president Harry Shriver brought in Miller to handle the radio play-by-play duties with veteran broadcaster Tom Marr. In his first year in Baltimore, Miller called the Orioles' World Series championship run, including the last out of Game 5:

The cheering you hear is from Oriole fans. Everybody else is in muted silence. The pitch! Line drive! Ripken catches it at shortstop! And the Orioles are champions of the world!

He eventually signed a contract directly with the Orioles and, while the broadcast rights eventually moved to rival station WBAL, Miller remained their primary announcer through 1996. At the end of that season, Orioles owner Peter Angelos, displeased with Miller's often candid commentary on the Orioles play, declined to renew his contract, citing a desire for a broadcaster who would "bleed more orange and black." Miller returned to the Bay Area and joined his hometown Giants.

=== San Francisco Giants ===
Since 1997, Miller has been the primary play-by-play voice of the San Francisco Giants (replacing Hank Greenwald), calling games on KNBR radio as well as KTVU (1997–2007) and KNTV (2008–2021) television. In February 2007, he signed a six-year extension to remain the voice of the Giants through the 2012 season.

==== Barry Bonds' 71st MLB home run in 2001 ====
On October 5, 2001, Miller made the call of Barry Bonds' record-breaking 71st home run:

There’s a high drive deep into right-center field, to the big part of the ballpark … NUMBER 71! And what a shot, over the 421-foot marker! The deepest part of any ballpark in the National League and Barry Bonds is now the home run king! Number 71 and it was impressive!

On May 27, 2003, during a game between the Giants and Arizona Diamondbacks, Miller called a play involving two defensive errors by the Diamondbacks and at least three separate baserunning mistakes by Giants outfielder Rubén Rivera. When Rivera was finally thrown out at home plate trying to score what would have been the winning run, Miller declared,

That was the worst base running in the history of the game!

The phrase was repeated numerous times on sports radio and highlight shows such as SportsCenter, and quickly became one of the most famous calls of Miller's long career. He did a similar call on the radio during Game 3 of the 2004 World Series, when Jeff Suppan made a baserunning mistake.

==== Barry Bonds' 756th career MLB home run ====
On August 7, 2007, Miller made the call of Barry Bonds' record-breaking 756th home run on KNBR:

Three and two to Bonds. Everybody standing here at 24 Willie Mays Plaza. An armada of nautical craft gathered in McCovey Cove beyond the right field wall. Bonds one home run away from history. (crack of the bat) and he swings, and there's a long one into right center field, way back there, it's gone! A home run! Into the center field bleachers to the left of the 421 foot marker. An extraordinary shot to the deepest part of the yard! And Barry Bonds with 756 home runs, he has hit more home runs than anyone who has ever played the game!

On July 16, 2010, the Giants organization, including fellow broadcaster Dave Flemming, honored Miller at AT&T Park in a pregame ceremony about one week before Miller received the Ford C. Frick Award. Before the game started, Miller threw out the ceremonial first pitch. On September 4, 2010, Miller called his first game for CSN Bay Area as a substitute for Dave Flemming, who was broadcasting a Stanford football game on the radio.

==== Pablo Sandoval 2012 World Series Game 1 Third Homer ====
On October 24, 2012, Miller made the call of Pablo Sandoval's third home run in Game 1 of the 2012 World Series:

The one-one pitch. He swings and he belts one, deep center-field, [Austin] Jackson is going back, and, GONE! A HOME RUN! Number three for Pablo Sandoval! His first three at bats in this World Series. And Pablo Sandoval looks like The Babe himself has come back to life.

==== 2014 World Series clincher ====
On October 29, 2014, Miller made the radio call on KNBR of the final out of the 2014 World Series, the Giants' third title in five years. His call also mentions the pitching performance of Madison Bumgarner through the playoffs. Miller's call went like this:

Madison Bumgarner trying to wrap up this World Series for the Giants. He's ready. He throws, swing and a POP-UP! [Pablo] Sandoval down the line in foul ground, he's got plenty of room, and he's got it! And the Giants have won; they have won the World Series for the third time in five years. And Madison Bumgarner has firmly etched his name on the all-time World Series record books as one of the greatest World Series pitchers the game has ever seen!

==== 2016 home opener ====
On April 7, 2016, Miller accidentally called a grand slam by Hunter Pence for Buster Posey, but corrected himself mid-sentence:

Swing and there's a high drive, deep into left-center field, it's on its way... adios pelota! A grand slam for Buster Posey...'s good friend, Hunter Pence.

Both Pence and Posey later referenced the call on their social media accounts, and Miller himself used the phrase intentionally a week later when Pence hit another home run.

==== 2026 Walk-Off Grand Slam Following 8-Run Comeback vs. the Nationals ====
Miller made yet another memorable call on June 10, 2026. The Giants were down 9-1 before rallying for 10 runs in the final two innings, including a walk-off grand slam by 21-year-old Bryce Eldridge.

=== National baseball work ===
From 1986 to 1989, Miller did backup play-by-play for NBC's Saturday Game of the Week telecasts, paired with either Tony Kubek or Joe Garagiola. He also called regional telecasts for The Baseball Network in 1994–1995.

From 1990 to 2010, Miller did national television and radio broadcasts of regular-season and postseason games for ESPN, most prominently alongside Hall of Famer Joe Morgan on ESPN's Sunday Night Baseball telecasts. Among his ESPN assignments, Miller called 13 World Series and 10 League Championship Series for ESPN Radio. During Game 3 of the 2000 World Series, Miller was forced to leave the booth after the top of the first inning due to an upper respiratory infection. Charley Steiner, who was serving as a field reporter for the network, filled in on play-by-play for the rest of the game; Miller resumed his duties in Game 4 of the Series. In November 2010, it was announced that Miller and Morgan would not be returning to the Sunday night telecasts for the 2011 season. Miller was offered, but declined, a continued role with ESPN Radio.

In June 2021, Miller teamed with Mike Krukow, John Kruk, and Jimmy Rollins for the Phillies vs Giants series on Peacock.

In May 2022, Miller teamed with Shawn Estes and Barry Larkin to call the national telecast of a Giants-Reds game for MLB Sunday Leadoff on Peacock, substituting for regular play-by-play announcer Jason Benetti.

=== Other appearances ===
Miller's voice can be heard in the Season 1 Cheers episode "The Tortelli Tort", during a scene where the gang at the bar is watching a Red Sox game on the television. He also is briefly heard in the films 61* and Summer Catch and in the English release of the animated movie My Neighbors the Yamadas, and appears as himself in two episodes of the HBO series Arliss.

In 1998, Miller wrote a book with Mark S. Hyman titled Confessions of a Baseball Purist: What's Right—and Wrong—with Baseball, as Seen from the Best Seat in the House (ISBN 0-8018-6316-3), in which he expounded on the then-current state of the sport.

Miller guest-starred as Jordan in the episode "Little Octi Lost" of the 2016 reboot of the Cartoon Network original series The Powerpuff Girls.

=== Awards and honors ===
Miller received numerous honors for his ESPN work, including six CableACE Award nominations (winning the award in 1991 and 1996) and several Emmy Award nominations. The National Sportscasters and Sportswriters Association inducted him into its Hall of Fame in 1998, the Baseball Hall of Fame selected him for its Ford C. Frick Award in 2010, and the National Radio Hall of Fame inducted him in 2014. Miller was inducted into the Bay Area Radio Hall of Fame in 2010, with Dan Odum, his broadcasting professor from the College of San Mateo, serving as his presenter.

=== Commentating style ===
Miller's delivery is notable for his easygoing, sometimes humorous manner and measured use of hyperbole, particularly in banter with his sportscasting partners. He livens up many broadcasts with a few Hawaiian and Japanese phrases spoken with very accurate pronunciation, and has been known to announce a half inning totally in Spanish. It is notable that Miller generally pronounces foreign language names with the source language pronunciation, in contrast with broadcasters who "Anglicize" foreign-named players. Miller is also known for his meticulous scorekeeping, having scored over 5,500 games since he started broadcasting.

Miller will occasionally quote lines from Shakespeare plays during radio broadcasts. He is well known for his foul ball call, "That ball is fooooul", and his emphatic cries of "Two!" for a successful double play and "Safe!" (which he pronounces like an umpire's "Hafe!" call) on close baserunning plays. Early in his career, Miller would punctuate home runs with the signature call, "Tell it goodbye!" (in emulation of longtime Giants announcer Lon Simmons), and he continues to refer to a home run as a "big fly". His home run call for Hispanic batters is now punctuated, "Adios, pelota!" (a phrase he occasionally uses for home runs hit by non-Hispanics as well).

Miller is noted in baseball circles for his impersonation of Los Angeles Dodgers announcer Vin Scully. Miller also imitates Harry Caray, Chuck Thompson, Jack Buck, Al Michaels, Babe Ruth, Bob Sheppard, and Harry Kalas, among others. Asked how he got into broadcasting play by play of baseball games, he recalled being in stands at Candlestick Park as a child and looking into the broadcast booth. In the middle of the at-bat, he watched as the broadcaster consumed a handful of fries and a drink between pitches, thinking, "That is the life for me."

While calling games on the radio for the Giants, Miller occasionally introduces himself and his fellow broadcaster(s), followed by the phrase, "your Giants broadcasters". The same is repeated when Miller is on TV, except he replaces the word "broadcasters" with "telecasters." (Miller is referred to by fellow Giants broadcaster Mike Krukow as "The Big Kahuna".) He would use similar terminology for his Sunday Night Baseball telecasts on ESPN ("your Sunday night telecasters") and his World Series broadcasts for ESPN Radio ("your World Series broadcasters").

== Personal life ==
Miller was married to Roberta Creeron for seven years in the 1970s; they have two daughters. In 1986, he re-united with childhood friend Janine Allen, who had also married and divorced and had one daughter. The couple married in 1987 and have one son together. They resided in Moss Beach, California, for many years, before moving to an apartment near Oracle Park. Jon's daughter Emilie Miller is an actress who appeared in a 2014 episode of Law & Order: Special Victims Unit.

Sporting positions
Preceded by First	Sunday Night Baseball play-by-play announcer 1990–2010	Succeeded by Dan Shulman
Preceded by Vin Scully	World Series national radio play-by-play announcer 1998–2010	Succeeded by Dan Shulman
