= NBC Sports Bay Area =

- Country: United States
- Broadcast area: San Francisco Bay Area; National (via satellite)
- Network: NBC Sports Regional Networks
- Headquarters: 360 3rd St, San Francisco, CA 94107

Programming
- Languages: English; Spanish (via SAP)
- Picture format: 1080i (HDTV); 480i (SDTV)

Ownership
- Owner: NBC Sports Bay Area Holdings (NBC Sports Group and San Francisco Giants)
- Sister channels: Cable/satellite: NBC Sports California; Broadcast: KNTV & KSTS/San Jose

History
- Launched: September 1989; 37 years ago
- Former names: Pacific Sports Network (1989–1991); SportsChannel Bay Area (1990–1991); SportsChannel Pacific (1991–1998); Fox Sports Bay Area (1998–1999); Fox Sports Net Bay Area (1999–2004); FSN Bay Area (2004–2008); Comcast SportsNet Bay Area (2008–2017)

Links
- Website: www.nbcsports.com/bayarea

Availability (some events may air on overflow feed NBC Sports Bay Area Plus due to event conflicts)

Streaming media
- Peacock: peacocktv.com (U.S. internet subscribers in eligible area only; requires add-on to subscription to access content)
- DirecTV Stream: Internet Protocol television
- YouTubeTV: Internet Protocol television
- Hulu Live: Internet Protocol television
- FuboTV: Internet Protocol television

NBC Sports Bay Area (sometimes abbreviated as NBCS Bay Area) is an American regional sports network owned as a joint venture between NBCUniversal and the San Francisco Giants, and operates as an affiliate of NBC Sports Regional Networks. Headquartered in San Francisco, the channel broadcasts regional coverage of professional sports events throughout the San Francisco Bay Area. NBCS Bay Area's sister channel is NBC Sports California. The president of the network is Ted Griggs.

== History ==
=== Pacific Sports Network ===
The Pacific Sports Network was launched in September 1989 as a joint-venture of TCI and Viacom. It initially held rights to the Golden State Warriors and various college sporting events, including those from Pac 10 conference through its associate with Prime Network. The network was available as a basic cable service.

=== SportsChannel Bay Area ===
SportsChannel Bay Area was an owned-and-operated outlet of SportsChannel that launched on April 2, 1990, under the ownership of Rainbow Media, the broadcasting subsidiary of Cablevision Systems Corporation. The new network was formed when both the Oakland Athletics and San Francisco Giants reached an agreement with SportsChannel to televise their games. The Athletics' contract included 50 games and while the Giants' had 55 games, an increase of 20 games from the team's previous pay-per-view service GiantsVision. Both teams had also been in negotiations with the Pacific Sports Network, but didn't want their games shown on basic cable. At launch, SportsChannel Bay Area was offered as a premium channel in-market and as a basic cable service in the outer market which included southern Oregon, Nevada, Hawaii, and Arizona. Other programming included SportsChannel's national programming which featured its NHL package. Additionally, SportsChannel Bay Area televised local college and high school sports, including the University of San Francisco, San Jose State, and California and Stanford games that were not part of Prime's PAC 10 package.

=== Merger of two networks and new partnership ===
The two networks merged on July 12, 1991, to become SportsChannel Pacific. The combined network operated as a premium service until June 1, 1997 when it moved to basic cable. In 1991, SportsChannel Pacific picked up rights to the new San Jose Sharks NHL team with a 10 game agreement.

On June 30, 1997, News Corporation and Liberty Media – which formed Fox Sports Net the year prior through News Corporation's partial acquisition of the Liberty-owned Prime Network group of regional sports networks – purchased a 40% interest in Cablevision's sports properties including the SportsChannel networks (as well as Madison Square Garden and its NBA and NHL team tenants, the New York Knicks and New York Rangers); the three companies formed the venture National Sports Partners to run the owned-and-operated regional networks. The channel was rebranded as Fox Sports Bay Area on January 28, 1998, at which time most of the SportsChannel networks (with the exception of SportsChannel Florida, which did not join the network until 2000) underwent a near-groupwide rebranding as part of their integration into the Fox Sports Net family. Prior to the Cablevision decision to affiliate with Fox Sports, some FSN programming had been airing on BayTV, a local cable channel operated by KRON-TV and Liberty Media's sister company TCI; the deal which was signed in March 1997 was to last three years. Fox Sports News continued airing on BayTV until March 31, 1998, when it was moved to Fox Sports Bay Area. However, most of FSN's Pac-10 telecasts also remained on BayTV until the affiliation agreement expired in January 2000. Fox Sports Bay Area aired only a limited number of games featuring local and state teams (usually when there was a scheduling conflict). This led to viewers complaints since the better games were often on BayTV which had limited distribution.

The channel was then rebranded as Fox Sports Net Bay Area in 2000, as part of a collective brand modification of the FSN networks under the "Fox Sports Net" banner; subsequently in 2004, the channel shortened its name to FSN Bay Area, through the networks' de-emphasis of the brand.

=== Comcast ownership ===
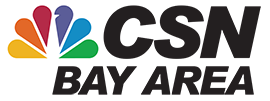
Comcast SportsNet Bay Area logo from March 2013 to April 1, 2017.

On April 30, 2007, Comcast purchased a 60% interest in FSN Bay Area, along with a 50% stake in FSN New England, from Rainbow Media for $570 million. Then on December 10, the San Francisco Giants acquired a 30% stake in FSN Bay Area, with News Corporation becoming a minority partner in the network. As a result of Comcast becoming the majority interest holder, the network (after the sale was finalized in February 2008) was integrated into the company's own regional sports network group Comcast SportsNet, rebranding as Comcast SportsNet Bay Area on March 31, 2008. CSN Bay Area became the first Comcast SportsNet-branded network to use a logo style (utilizing Comcast's then-universal corporate logo), based on the logo for SportsNet New York, that was later adopted by all the other CSN regional networks on October 1, 2008. Shortly after the rebranding in April 2008, Fox agreed to sell its interest in CSN Bay Area to Comcast.

In April 2011, following Comcast's acquisition of NBC Universal, CSN Bay Area announced that it would produce the sportscasts for NBC owned-and-operated station KNTV using the network's anchors and analysts. These reports would come from a dedicated studio at CSN Bay Area's studios, and include sports news and interviews.

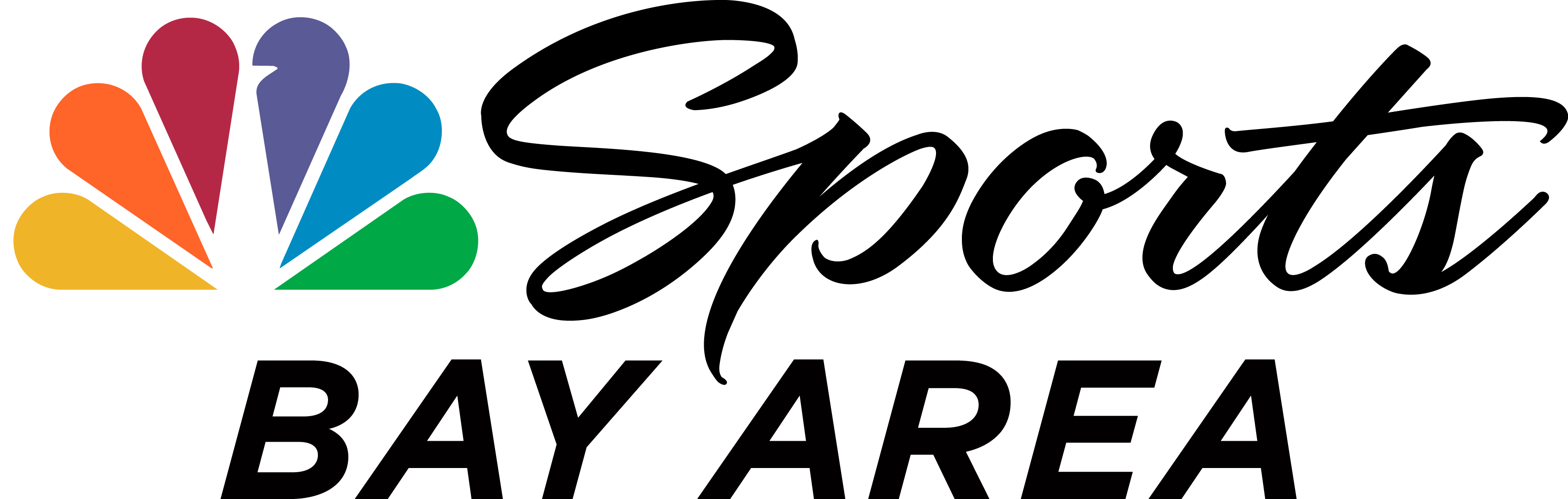
Logo of NBC Sports Bay Area used from April 2, 2017 until 2023

On March 22, 2017, Comcast announced that CSN Bay Area would be rebranded as NBC Sports Bay Area on April 2, 2017, in a move meant to "better associate the prestigious NBC Sports legacy with the strength of our Comcast Sports Networks' local sports coverage in Northern California."

In mid-January 2025, Xfinity announced that NBC Sports Bay Area and California would be moved from the provider's "Popular" tier to "Ultimate", in a move which faced criticism from fans due to the higher price. An Xfinity spokesperson told the San Francisco Chronicle that the majority of the network's viewers were already subscribed to the "Ultimate" tier, and that the change would allow it to reduce prices for "Popular" tier subscribers that are not interested in sports.

In March 2025, it was announced that NBC Sports Bay Area and the remaining NBC Sports Regional affiliates would be available on Peacock as a Sports add-on.

== Programming ==
NBC Sports Bay Area holds the regional cable television rights to the San Francisco Giants of Major League Baseball and the NBA's Golden State Warriors. The network also airs athletic events from San Jose State University and the university's show The Charge.

The channel also broadcasts college sports sanctioned by the West Coast Conference. Select high school sports events are also occasionally broadcast on the network.

Until 2004, the network also broadcast games involving the NBA's Sacramento Kings. Following the expiration of their contracts with the then-FSN Bay Area, the owners of the Kings partnered with Comcast to create CSN Bay Area's sister channel, Comcast SportsNet West (now NBC Sports California). CSN Bay Area was also home to the Oakland Athletics Major League Baseball franchise until the end of the 2008 season, when the team's games also moved to CSN California; similarly, CSN Bay Area was the home of the NHL's San Jose Sharks until the end of the 2008–09 NHL season when their games also moved to Comcast SportsNet California. CSN Bay Area also televised select California Golden Bears and Stanford Cardinal sports not on national television before the third-tier rights to their games moved to Pac-12 Network upon its launch in 2012.

Through its partial ownership by Fox, CSN Bay Area formerly carried programming distributed nationally for Fox Sports Networks affiliates, even after relinquishing controlling ownership of the network to Comcast and the Giants. This included access to a variety of college sports, notably Sunday telecasts of men's and women's basketball games from the Atlantic Coast Conference, Pac-12 basketball games on various nights, as well as Saturday telecasts of football games from the Pac-12 and Big 12 Conferences during their respective seasons. Most of that programming has shifted to Fox Sports' national sports network Fox Sports 1 or Fox College Sports, with Comcast SportsNet having dropped FSN-distributed programming in September 2012 after the two parties were unable to renew their program content agreement. This arrangement was formed to secure national coverage for its lineup of collegiate sports events. The channel also aired simulcasts of radio shows such as The Dan Patrick Show until those programs were inherited by NBC Sports Network.

== Current and former notable staff members ==
- Rich Aurilia – Giants studio analyst
- Kelenna Azubuike – Warriors color analyst
- Jim Barnett - Warriors color analyst
- Vida Blue – Giants studio analyst
- Scott Reiss - SportsNet Central anchor, San Francisco Giants and San Jose Sharks pregame/postgame host
- Brodie Brazil – SportsNet Central anchor and reporter
- Laura Britt – Multi-platform host and reporter
- Dennis Brown – 49ers studio analyst
- Kerith Burke – Warriors sideline reporter
- Shawn Estes – Giants studio analyst
- Ahmed Fareed – SportsNet Central anchor and reporter
- Dave Feldman – SportsNet Central anchor and reporter
- Bob Fitzgerald – Warriors play-by-play announcer
- Amy Gutierrez – Giants sideline reporter
- Kelli Johnson – SportsNet Central anchor and reporter
- Jim Kozimor – SportsTalk Live anchor
- Mike Krukow – Giants color analyst
- Duane Kuiper – Giants play-by-play announcer
- Bill Laskey – Giants studio analyst
- Matt Maiocco – 49ers Insider
- Greg Papa – Warriors pre-game and post-game host, substitute Giants pre-game and post-game host, and substitute play-by-play announcer
- Monte Poole - Warriors insider, founding member and co-host of “Race In America: A Candid Conversation.”
- Ray Ratto – NBC Sports Bay Area Senior Insider
- Garry St. Jean – Warriors studio analyst
- Randy Winn – Giants studio analyst
- Henry Wofford – Warriors reporter, host of Race Week, and SportsNet Central anchor and reporter
- Ron Wotus – Giants studio analyst
