= List of ESPN Major League Baseball broadcasters =

ESPN MLB broadcasters are as follows (including games broadcast only on ESPN currently and formerly):

== Current broadcasts ==
=== ESPN Major League Baseball ===
Play-by-play

- Jon Sciambi
- Joe Buck
- Kevin Brown
- Mike Monaco
- Roxy Bernstein

Analysts

- Eduardo Perez
- David Ross
- Jessica Mendoza
- Tim Kurkjian
- Doug Glanville
- Ben McDonald
- Gregg Olson
- Adam Ottavino
- Todd Frazier

Reporters

- Buster Olney
- Tim Kurkjian
- Alden Gonzalez

Hosts

- Kevin Connors

=== Monday Night Baseball ===
- Erin Andrews: (field reporter, 2004–2007)
- Jason Benetti: (play-by-play, 2021, select games)
- Chris Berman: (play-by-play, 1992)
- Aaron Boone: (analyst, 2010–2015)
- Dallas Braden: (analyst, 2015, second half of season; 2016–2017)
- Bob Carpenter: (play-by-play, 1993)
- David Cone: (color commentator, 2022, 2024, select games)
- Dave Flemming: (play-by-play, 2015–2021, select games)
- Doug Glanville: (analyst, 2021, select games)
- Tony Gwynn: (analyst, 2002–2005)
- Tom Hart: (play-by-play, 2021, select games)
- Orel Hershiser: (analyst, 2008–2010)
- Tommy Hutton: (analyst, 1992–1993)
- Tim Kurkjian: (field reporter, 2011–2014; analyst, lead color commentator 2017–2021)
- Ben McDonald: (analyst, 2024, select games)
- Sean McDonough: (play-by-play, 2011–2012)
- Tom Mees: (play-by-play, 1992)
- Jessica Mendoza: (analyst, 2020–2021, select games)
- Mike Monaco: (play-by-play, 2020–2021, select games)
- Mark Mulder: (analyst, 2014; 2015, first half of season)
- Dave O'Brien: (play-by-play, 2002–2007, 2013–2015)
- Buster Olney: (field reporter, 2022, 2024, select games)
- Jeff Passan: field reporter, 2024, select games)
- Eduardo Pérez: (lead color commentator, 2016–2021) (color commentator, 2022, 2024, select games)
- Kyle Peterson: (analyst, 2020–2021, select games)
- Steve Phillips: (analyst, 2008–2009)
- Karl Ravech: (lead play-by-play, 2016–2021) (play-by-play, 2022, 2024, select games)
- Curt Schilling: (analyst, 2016)
- Dan Shulman: (play-by-play, 2008–2010)
- Chris Singleton: (analyst, 2010)
- Larry Sorenson: (analyst, 1992–1993)
- Rick Sutcliffe: (analyst, 2002–2007, 2011–2013)
- Gary Thorne: (play-by-play, 1993)

=== Wednesday Night Baseball ===
- Manny Acta: (analyst, 2013–2015)
- Erin Andrews: (field reporter, 2008)
- Chris Berman: (play-by-play, 1990–2016, select games)
- Bonnie Bernstein: (field reporter, 2007, select games)
- Steve Berthiaume: (fill-in play-by-play, 2007–2012)
- Aaron Boone: (fill-in analyst, 2010–2017, for September games only)
- Jeff Brantley: (analyst, 2002–2005)
- Joe Buck: (play-by-play, 2026, select games)
- Chris Burke: (analyst, 2025, select games)
- Dave Campbell: (analyst, 1990–2002)
- Bob Carpenter: (play-by-play, 1990–2004)
- Duke Castiglione: (field reporter, 2006)
- David Cone: (analyst, 2022–2025, select games)
- Ron Darling: (analyst, 2026, select games)
- Nomar Garciaparra: (analyst, 2010–2013)
- Doug Glanville: (analyst, 2013–2017)
- Pedro Gomez (field reporter, 2011–2014)
- Alden Gonzalez (field reporter, 2023, select games)
- Orel Hershiser: (analyst, 2001 2006–2007; 2009–2010 for September games and 2026)
- Chipper Jones: (analyst, 2020)
- Tim Kurkjian: (field reporter, 2011–2014, for September games only) (analyst, 2023–2024, select games)
- Barry Larkin: (fill-in analyst, 2013–2014)
- Steve Levy: (fill-in play-by-play, 2013–2021)
- Buck Martinez: (analyst, 1992–2000 and 2002–05)
- Sean McDonough: (play-by-play, 2011–2012, for September games only; 2013-2015, select games)
- Jessica Mendoza: (analyst, 2023, select games)
- Mike Monaco: (play-by-play, 2022, select games)
- Mark Mulder: (fill-in analyst, 2013–2015)
- Joe Morgan: (analyst, 1990–2010, select games)
- Dave O'Brien: (play-by-play, 2008–2012; 2013–2015, for September games only)
- Buster Olney: (field reporter, 2022, 2024–2025, select games)
- Eduardo Pérez: (analyst, 2022–2025, select games)
- Kyle Peterson – Analyst (2025) select games
- Steve Phillips: (analyst, 2007)
- Karl Ravech: (fill-in play-by-play, 2013–2021) (play-by-play, 2022–2025, select games)
- Alex Rodriguez: (color commentator, 2022, select games)
- David Ross: (analyst, 2017–2019)
- Curt Schilling: (analyst, 2013–2016)
- Jon Sciambi: (play-by-play, 2005; fill-in play-by-play, 2013, 2025; play-by-play, 2014–2021)
- Xavier Scruggs: (analyst 2021)
- Dan Shulman: (play-by-play, 1995–2007; 2009–2010 for September games)
- Dave Sims (play-by-play, 1993–1994)
- Dewayne Staats (play-by-play, 1995–1997)
- Rick Sutcliffe: (analyst, 2008–2021)
- Gary Thorne (play-by-play, 1990–2009)
- Steve Zabriskie (play-by-play, 1990–1993)
- Note: Between 1990-2005, the Wednesday night telecast appeared as a doubleheader. That is why there are multiple play-by-play commentators and analysts listed from those years.

== Former broadcasts ==
=== ESPN DayGame ===
- Erin Andrews: (field reporter, 2005)
- David Justice: (analyst, 2003–2005)
- Gary Miller: (field reporter, 2003–2005)
- Steve Phillips: (analyst, 2004–2005)
- Steve Stone: (analyst, 2004–2005)
- Gary Thorne: (play-by-play, 2003–2005)

=== Thursday Night Baseball ===
- Chris Berman: (play-by-play, 2005–2006)
- Duke Castiglione: (field reporter, 2006)
- Eric Karros: (analyst, 2005–2006)
- Joe Morgan: (analyst, 2005–2006)

=== Friday Night Baseball ===
- Dave Campbell (analyst, 1991–1993)
- Norm Hitzges (analyst, 1990)
- Ray Knight (analyst, 1991)
- Tom Mees (play-by-play, 1992)
- Joel Meyers (play-by-play, 1993)
- Jim Palmer (analyst, 1990)
- Steve Physioc (play-by-play, 1991–1993)
- Jerry Reuss (analyst, 1992–1993)
- Gary Thorne (play-by-play, 1990–1992)
- Steve Zabriskie (play-by-play, 1990–1993)
- John Sanders (play-by-play, 1990)

=== Tuesday Night Baseball ===
- Chris Berman (play-by-play, 1990–1991)
- Dave Campbell (analyst, 1993)
- Tommy Hutton (analyst, 1990–1991)
- Ray Knight (analyst, 1990)
- Sean McDonough (play-by-play, 1990–1993)
- Steve Physioc (play-by-play, 1993)
- Jerry Reuss (analyst, 1991)
- Steve Zabriskie (play-by-play, 1991–1993)

=== Sunday Night Baseball ===
- Bonnie Bernstein: (field reporter, 2006)
- Aaron Boone: (color commentator, 2016–2017)
- David Cone: (color commentator, 2022–2025)
- Terry Francona: (analyst, 2012)
- Peter Gammons: (field analyst, 2006–2008)
- Orel Hershiser: (color commentator, 2010–2013)
- John Kruk: (color commentator, 2013–2015)
- Álvaro Martín: (field reporter, 2000–2001)
- Jessica Mendoza: (color commentator, 2015–2019)
- Jon Miller: (play-by-play, 1990–2010)
- Joe Morgan: (color commentator, 1990–2010)
- Wendi Nix: (field reporter, 2011)
- Buster Olney: (field reporter, 2011–2025)
- Eduardo Pérez: (color commentator, 2022–2025)
- Steve Phillips: (color commentator, 2009)
- Karl Ravech: (play-by-play, 2022–2025)
- Alex Rodriguez: (color commentator, 2018–2021)
- Sam Ryan: (field reporter, 2004–2006)
- Curt Schilling: (color commentator, 2014–2015)
- Dan Shulman: (play-by-play, 2011–2017)
- Bobby Valentine: (color commentator, 2011)
- Matt Vasgersian: (play-by-play, 2018–2021)

== Personalities ==
=== Former ===
- Adam Amin: play-by-play (2018–2019) select games
- Erin Andrews: field reporter (2004–2008) Monday Night Baseball and Wednesday Night Baseball
- Jason Benetti: play-by-play (2018–2021) select games
- Bonnie Bernstein: field reporter (2006) Sunday Night Baseball, (2007–2008) Wednesday Night Baseball
- Steve Berthiaume: host (2004–2005, 2007–2012) Baseball Tonight (TV play-by-play for the Arizona D'Backs)
- Dusty Baker: analyst (2007) Baseball Tonight
- Aaron Boone: analyst (2010–2017) Baseball Tonight, Sunday Night Baseball and Monday Night Baseball
- Larry Bowa: analyst (2005) Baseball Tonight
- Jim Bowden: analyst (2012–2017) Baseball Tonight
- Jeff Brantley: analyst (2002–2006) Baseball Tonight
- Dave Campbell: analyst (1990–2004) Baseball Tonight
- Bob Carpenter: play-by-play (1990–2004) Wednesday Night Baseball
- Duke Castiglione: field reporter (2006) Wednesday Night Baseball
- Kevin Connors – play-by-play (2020–2025) select games
- Alex Cora: analyst (2013–2016) Baseball Tonight
- Rece Davis: host (2004) Baseball Tonight
- Orestes Destrade: analyst (2005–) Baseball Tonight
- Rob Dibble: analyst (1998–2004) Baseball Tonight
- Rich Eisen: host (1996–2002) Baseball Tonight
- Dave Flemming – play-by-play (2013–2025) select games
- Terry Francona: analyst (2012) Sunday Night Baseball
- Peter Gammons: field reporter (2006–2008) Sunday Night Baseball, studio reporter (1990–2009) Baseball Tonight
- Nomar Garciaparra: analyst (2010–2013) Baseball Tonight and Wednesday Night Baseball
- Doug Glanville – analyst (2010–2017) Baseball Tonight and (2021–2025) select games
- Pedro Gomez: correspondent (2004–2020)
- Tony Gwynn: analyst (2002–2005) Monday Night Baseball and Wednesday Night Baseball
- Tom Hart – play-by-play (2020–2025) select games
- Orel Hershiser: analyst (2001) Wednesday Night Baseball, analyst (2006–2013) Baseball Tonight, Monday Night Baseball, Wednesday Night Baseball and Sunday Night Baseball
- Jim Hughson: play-by-play (1992–1994) select games
- Chipper Jones: analyst (2020) Wednesday Night Baseball
- David Justice: analyst (2003–2004) ESPN DayGame
- Eric Karros: analyst (2005–2006) select games
- Michael Kay – play-by-play (2022–2025) Kay-Rod/select games
- Brian Kenny: host (2003) Baseball Tonight
- Ray Knight: analyst (1998–2003) Baseball Tonight
- John Kruk: analyst (2004–2016) Baseball Tonight, analyst (2013–2015) Sunday Night Baseball
- Tim Kurkjian – reporter (1998–2025) Baseball Tonight and Monday Night Baseball
- Barry Larkin: analyst (2011–2014) Baseball Tonight
- Mike Macfarlane: analyst (1999) Baseball Tonight
- Dave Marash: host (1990) Baseball Tonight
- Buck Martinez: analyst (1992–2000), (2002–2007) select games
- Tino Martinez: analyst (2006) Baseball Tonight
- Brian McRae: analyst (2000–2005) Baseball Tonight
- Jessica Mendoza – analyst (2014–2025) Baseball Tonight, analyst (2015–2019) Sunday Night Baseball, Monday Night Baseball and Wednesday Night Baseball
- Gary Miller: host (1990–1995) Baseball Tonight, field reporter (2002–2005) ESPN DayGame
- Jon Miller: play-by-play (1990–2010) Sunday Night Baseball
- Mike Monaco – Occasional play-by-play (2021–2025)
- Joe Morgan: analyst (1990–2010) Sunday Night Baseball
- Mark Mulder: analyst (2011–2015) Baseball Tonight
- Chris Myers: host (1991–1995) Baseball Tonight
- Wendi Nix: field reporter (2011–) Sunday Night Baseball
- Dave O'Brien: play-by-play (2002–2017) Monday Night Baseball and Wednesday Night Baseball
- Buster Olney – reporter (2003–2025) Baseball Tonight and Sunday Night Baseball
- Melanie Newman – play-by-play (2021–2025) select games in September
- Eduardo Pérez – analyst (2007–2011), (2014–present) Baseball Tonight, analyst (2016-2017) Sunday Night Baseball, Monday night Baseball and occasionally Wednesday night Baseball 2018–2025
- Kyle Peterson – Analyst (2020–2025) select games
- Steve Phillips: analyst (2006–2009) Baseball Tonight, analyst (2005–2009) Wednesday Night Baseball, analyst (2009) Sunday Night Baseball
- Karl Ravech – host and play-by-play (1995–2026) Baseball Tonight and Monday Night Baseball
- Scott Reiss: host (2005–2010) Baseball Tonight
- Harold Reynolds: analyst (1996–2006) Baseball Tonight
- Marly Rivera: reporter and ESPN Radio Analyst (2021–2023)
- Bill Robinson: analyst (1990–1991) Baseball Tonight
- Alex Rodriguez – Sunday Night Baseball (2018–2021); (2022–2023) Kay-Rod/select games
- David Ross: analyst (2017–2019) Baseball Tonight and Monday or Wednesday Night Baseball mainly as a 2nd Analyst and occasionally as the only Analyst.
- Sam Ryan: field reporter (2004–2006) Sunday Night Baseball
- Curt Schilling: analyst (2010–2016) Baseball Tonight, analyst (2014–2016) Sunday Night Baseball and Monday Night Baseball
- Jon Sciambi – play-by-play (2005; 2013–2025) Wednesday Night Baseball; host (2012–2025) Baseball Tonight
- Xavier Scruggs – Occasional analyst (2021–2025)
- Buck Showalter: analyst (2001–2002, 2008–2010) Baseball Tonight
- Dan Shulman- play-by-play (1995–2022) Sunday Night Baseball,- 2002-2007 - ESPN Radio and 2011-2017- ESPN Monday Night Baseball 1995-2017 and Wednesday Night Baseball 1995-2022, Select MLB Regular Season games - mostly on Holidays
- Chris Singleton – analyst (2008–2025) Baseball Tonight, analyst (2010) Monday Night Baseball
- Jayson Stark: reporter (2003–2017) Baseball Tonight
- Steve Stone: analyst (2005–2006) ESPN DayGame
- Rick Sutcliffe – analyst (2002–2025) Monday Night Baseball and Wednesday Night Baseball – mainly Wednesday Night Baseball
- Mark Teixeira: analyst (2017–2020) Baseball Tonight and select MLB Regular Season Games
- Gary Thorne: play-by-play (1990–1993), (1996–2000), (2003-2009) select games
- Bobby Valentine: analyst (2003; 2009–2011) Baseball Tonight and Sunday Night Baseball
- Matt Vasgersian- Sunday Night Baseball (2018–2021)
- Adnan Virk: host (2017–2018) Baseball Tonight; play-by-play (2017–2018) Wednesday Night Baseball
- Todd Walker: analyst (2017–2018) Baseball Tonight
- Eric Young: analyst (2007–2010) Baseball Tonight
- Dave Winfield: analyst (2009–) Baseball Tonight

== See also ==
- ESPN Major League Baseball
- Major League Baseball on ABC
- Baseball Tonight
- Sunday Night Baseball
- Monday Night Baseball
- Wednesday Night Baseball
- Major League Baseball on ESPN Radio
- List of Major League Baseball on ESPN Radio broadcasters
- List of Major League Baseball on ABC announcers
- List of American League Division Series broadcasters
- List of National League Division Series broadcasters
