= List of Major League Baseball on ESPN Radio broadcasters =

Listed below is a list of Major League Baseball on ESPN Radio broadcasters by both name and year since the program's debut on ESPN Radio in 1998.

== By name ==
=== Sunday Night Baseball ===
==== Current ====
- Doug Glanville: (color commentator, 2022–present)
- Marc Kestecher: (pregame host, 2008–present)
- Jon Sciambi: (play-by-play, 2010–present)

==== Former ====
- Dave Campbell: (color commentator, 1999–2010)
- Joe D'Ambrosio: (pregame host, 1998–2007)
- Kevin Kennedy: (analyst, 1998)
- Dan Shulman: (play-by-play, 2002–2007)
- Chris Singleton: (color commentator, 2011–2021)
- Charley Steiner: (play-by-play, 1998–2001)
- Gary Thorne: (play-by-play, 2008–2009)

== By year ==
=== Regular season ===
Year	Play-by-Play	Color commentator	Pregame host
1998	Charley Steiner	Kevin Kennedy	Joe D'Ambrosio
1999	Charley Steiner	Dave Campbell	Joe D'Ambrosio
2000	Charley Steiner	Dave Campbell	Joe D'Ambrosio
2001	Charley Steiner	Dave Campbell	Joe D'Ambrosio
2002	Dan Shulman	Dave Campbell	Joe D'Ambrosio
2003	Dan Shulman	Dave Campbell	Joe D'Ambrosio
2004	Dan Shulman	Dave Campbell	Joe D'Ambrosio
2005	Dan Shulman	Dave Campbell	Joe D'Ambrosio
2006	Dan Shulman	Dave Campbell	Joe D'Ambrosio
2007	Dan Shulman	Dave Campbell	Joe D'Ambrosio
2008	Gary Thorne	Dave Campbell	Marc Kestecher
2009	Gary Thorne	Dave Campbell	Marc Kestecher
2010	Jon Sciambi	Dave Campbell	Marc Kestecher
2011	Jon Sciambi	Chris Singleton	Marc Kestecher
2012	Jon Sciambi	Chris Singleton	Marc Kestecher
2013	Jon Sciambi	Chris Singleton	Marc Kestecher
2014	Jon Sciambi	Chris Singleton	Marc Kestecher
2015	Jon Sciambi	Chris Singleton	Marc Kestecher
2016	Jon Sciambi	Chris Singleton	Marc Kestecher
2017	Jon Sciambi	Chris Singleton	Marc Kestecher
2018	Jon Sciambi	Chris Singleton	Marc Kestecher
2019	Jon Sciambi	Chris Singleton	Marc Kestecher
2020	Jon Sciambi	Chris Singleton	Marc Kestecher
2021	Jon Sciambi	Chris Singleton	Marc Kestecher
2022	Jon Sciambi	Doug Glanville	Marc Kestecher or Kevin Winter
2023	Jon Sciambi	Doug Glanville	Marc Kestecher or Kevin Winter
2024	Jon Sciambi	Doug Glanville	Marc Kestecher or Kevin Winter
2025	Jon Sciambi	Doug Glanville	Marc Kestecher or Jim Basquil
2026	Jon Sciambi	Doug Glanville	Marc Kestecher or Jim Basquil

=== All-Star Game ===
Year	Play-by-Play	Color commentator	Pregame host
1998	Charley Steiner	Kevin Kennedy	Joe D'Ambrosio
1999	Charley Steiner	Dave Campbell	Joe D'Ambrosio
2000	Charley Steiner	Dave Campbell	Joe D'Ambrosio
2001	Charley Steiner	Dave Campbell	Joe D'Ambrosio
2002	Dan Shulman	Dave Campbell	Joe D'Ambrosio
2003	Dan Shulman	Dave Campbell	Joe D'Ambrosio
2004	Dan Shulman	Dave Campbell	Joe D'Ambrosio
2005	Dan Shulman	Dave Campbell	Joe D'Ambrosio
2006	Dan Shulman	Dave Campbell	Joe D'Ambrosio
2007	Dan Shulman	Dave Campbell	Joe D'Ambrosio
2008	Dan Shulman	Dave Campbell	Marc Kestecher
2009	Dan Shulman	Dave Campbell	Marc Kestecher
2010	Jon Sciambi	Dave Campbell	Marc Kestecher
2011	Jon Sciambi	Chris Singleton	Marc Kestecher
2012	Jon Sciambi	Chris Singleton	Marc Kestecher
2013	Jon Sciambi	Chris Singleton	Marc Kestecher
2014	Jon Sciambi	Chris Singleton	Marc Kestecher
2015	Jon Sciambi	Chris Singleton	Marc Kestecher
2016	Jon Sciambi	Chris Singleton	Marc Kestecher
2017	Jon Sciambi	Chris Singleton	Marc Kestecher
2018	Jon Sciambi	Chris Singleton	Marc Kestecher
2019	Jon Sciambi	Chris Singleton	Marc Kestecher
2020	Not held because of the COVID-19 pandemic		
2021	Jon Sciambi	Chris Singleton	Kevin Winter
2022	Jon Sciambi	Doug Glanville	Marc Kestecher
2023	Jon Sciambi	Doug Glanville	Kevin Winter
2024	Karl Ravech	Doug Glanville	Marc Kestecher
2025	Karl Ravech	Doug Glanville	Jim Basquil
2026	Karl Ravech	Doug Glanville	Jim Basquil

=== Wild Card Game ===
Year	AL	NL	Pregame host
2012	Dan Shulman and Orel Hershiser	Jon Sciambi and Chris Singleton	Marc Kestecher
2013	Jon Sciambi and Chris Singleton	Dan Shulman and Orel Hershiser	Marc Kestecher
2014	Jon Sciambi and Chris Singleton	Dave O'Brien and Aaron Boone	Marc Kestecher
2015	Dave O'Brien and Aaron Boone	Jon Sciambi and Chris Singleton	Marc Kestecher
2016	Jon Sciambi and Chris Singleton	Dave O'Brien and Jim Bowden	Marc Kestecher
2017	Jon Sciambi and Chris Singleton	Adam Amin and Eduardo Pérez	Marc Kestecher
2018	Jon Sciambi and Eduardo Pérez	Dan Shulman and Chris Singleton	Marc Kestecher or Kevin Winter
2019	Dan Shulman and Chris Singleton	Jon Sciambi and Jim Bowden	Marc Kestecher or Kevin Winter
2021	Dave O'Brien and Xavier Scruggs	Jon Sciambi and Kyle Peterson	Marc Kestecher

=== Wild Card Series ===
Year	AL 1	AL 2	AL 3	AL 4	NL 1	NL 2	NL 3	Pregame host(s)
2020	Kevin Brown and Chris Singleton	Jon Sciambi and Jim Bowden	Dan Shulman and Chris Burke	Dave O'Brien and Chris Singleton	Kevin Brown and Jim Bowden	Dan Shulman and Jim Bowden	Dave O'Brien and Chris Singleton	Kevin Winter, John Brickley or Chris Villani

Year	AL 1	AL 2	NL 1	NL 2	Pregame host(s)
2022	Dave O'Brien and Marly Rivera	Dan Shulman and Gregg Olson	Kevin Brown and Chris Burke	Roxy Bernstein and Kyle Peterson	Kevin Winter, John Brickley or Chris Villani
2023	Dave O'Brien and Kyle Peterson	Mike Monaco and Todd Frazier	Roxy Bernstein and Gregg Olson	Mike Couzens and Chris Burke	Kevin Winter, John Brickley or Chris Villani
2024	Dave O'Brien and Will Middlebrooks	Mike Monaco and Rubén Amaro Jr.	Mike Couzens and Chris Burke	Roxy Bernstein and Gregg Olson	Marc Kestecher, Kevin Winter or Pat O'Keefe
2025	Roxy Bernstein and Gregg Olson	Mike Ferrin and Kyle Peterson	Tom Hart and Tim Kurkjian	Mike Couzens and Chris Burke	Marc Kestecher, Jim Basquil, Pat O'Keefe or Chris Villani
2026	Michael Kay, Eduardo Pérez and Tim Kurkjian	Roxy Bernstein and Gregg Olson	Jon Sciambi and Doug Glanville	Dave O'Brien and Jessica Mendoza	Marc Kestecher, Jim Basquil, Nick DeLuca or Christine Lisi

=== Division Series ===
Year	ALDS 1	ALDS 2	NLDS 1	NLDS 2	Pregame host(s)
1998	Dan Shulman and Buck Martinez	Ernie Harwell and Dave Campbell	Gary Cohen and Kevin Kennedy	Charley Steiner and Rick Sutcliffe	Joe D'Ambrosio
1999	Dan Shulman and Buck Martinez	Ernie Harwell and Dave Campbell	Jim Durham and Mark Grace	Charley Steiner and Dusty Baker	Joe D'Ambrosio
2000	Dan Shulman and Rob Dibble	Ernie Harwell and Dave Campbell	Charley Steiner and Buck Martinez	Wayne Hagin and Mark Grace	Joe D'Ambrosio
2001	Dan Shulman and Rob Dibble	Charley Steiner and Dave Campbell	Jim Durham and Buck Showalter	Wayne Hagin and Buck Showalter	Joe D'Ambrosio
2002	Dan Shulman and Dave Campbell	John Rooney and Buck Martinez	Gary Cohen and Rob Dibble	Jim Durham and Buck Showalter	Joe D'Ambrosio
2003	Dan Shulman and Dave Campbell	John Rooney and Buck Martinez	Jim Durham and Joe Girardi	Gary Cohen and Luis Gonzalez	Joe D'Ambrosio
2004	Dan Shulman and Dave Campbell	John Rooney and Buck Martinez	Gary Cohen and Luis Gonzalez	Jim Durham and Rich Aurilia	Joe D'Ambrosio
2005	Jon Sciambi and Buck Martinez	Dan Shulman and Dave Campbell	Gary Cohen and Luis Gonzalez	Jim Durham and John Franco	Joe D'Ambrosio
2006	Jon Sciambi and Buck Martinez	Gary Thorne and Steve Stone	Dan Shulman and Dave Campbell	Wayne Hagin and Luis Gonzalez	Joe D'Ambrosio
2007	Dan Shulman and Dave Campbell	Jon Miller; Dusty Baker	Jon Sciambi; Buck Martinez	Gary Thorne and Steve Phillips	Joe D'Ambrosio
2008	Dan Shulman and Dave Campbell	Gary Thorne; Chris Singleton	Jon Miller and Rick Sutcliffe	Michael Kay and Steve Phillips	Marc Kestecher
2009	Jon Miller and Steve Phillips	Dan Shulman and Dave Campbell	Jon Sciambi and Aaron Boone	Chris Berman and Rick Sutcliffe (in Philadelphia); Gary Thorne and Chris Singleton (in Denver)	Marc Kestecher
2010	Dan Shulman and Bobby Valentine	Jon Miller and Orel Hershiser	Jon Sciambi and Dave Campbell	Chris Berman (in San Francisco); Dave O'Brien (in Atlanta); Rick Sutcliffe	Marc Kestecher
2011	Dan Shulman and Orel Hershiser	Gary Cohen and Aaron Boone	Jon Sciambi and Chris Singleton	Dave O'Brien (Games 1–2); Chris Berman (Games 3–5); Rick Sutcliffe (Games 1–4); Buck Martinez (Game 5)	Marc Kestecher
2012	Dan Shulman and Orel Hershiser	Dave O'Brien and Aaron Boone	Jon Sciambi and Chris Singleton	Gary Cohen (Games 1–2); Chris Berman (Games 3–5); Rick Sutcliffe	Marc Kestecher
2013	Jon Sciambi and Chris Singleton	Michael Kay and Aaron Boone	Dan Shulman and Orel Hershiser	Dave Flemming and Rick Sutcliffe	Marc Kestecher
2014	Jon Sciambi and Chris Singleton	Chris Berman (in Baltimore); Dave Flemming (in Detroit); Rick Sutcliffe	Dan Shulman and Aaron Boone	Dave O'Brien and John Kruk	Marc Kestecher
2015	Dave O'Brien and John Kruk	Chris Berman (Games 1–2); Dave Flemming (Games 3–4); Dan Shulman (Game 5); Rick Sutcliffe	Dan Shulman and Aaron Boone	Jon Sciambi and Chris Singleton	Marc Kestecher
2016	Jon Sciambi and Chris Singleton	Chris Berman (in Arlington); Michael Kay (in Toronto); Rick Sutcliffe	Dan Shulman and Aaron Boone	Dave O'Brien and Jim Bowden	Marc Kestecher
2017	Jon Sciambi and Chris Singleton	Chris Berman and Rick Sutcliffe	Dan Shulman and Aaron Boone	Dave Flemming and Jessica Mendoza	Marc Kestecher, Kevin Winter or John Brickley
2018	Jon Sciambi and Jessica Mendoza	Dave Flemming and Jim Bowden	Dan Shulman and Chris Singleton	Chris Berman and Rick Sutcliffe	Marc Kestecher, Kevin Winter, John Brickley or Jim Basquil
2019	Dan Shulman and Chris Singleton	Dave Flemming and Jim Bowden	Jon Sciambi and Jessica Mendoza	Chris Berman (Games 1–2, 4–5); Adam Amin (Game 3); Rick Sutcliffe	Marc Kestecher, Kevin Winter, John Brickley, Chris Villani or Jim Basquil
2020	Dan Shulman and Chris Singleton	Dave O'Brien; Jim Bowden (Games 1, 3–4); Kyle Peterson (Game 2)	Jon Sciambi and Kyle Peterson	Karl Ravech and Tim Kurkjian	Kevin Winter, John Brickley or Chris Villani
2021	Dan Shulman and Xavier Scruggs	Kevin Brown and Chris Burke	Jon Sciambi and Kyle Peterson	Karl Ravech and Tim Kurkjian	Marc Kestecher, Kevin Winter, John Brickley or Chris Villani
2022	Dan Shulman and Eduardo Pérez	Dave O'Brien and Marly Rivera	Jon Sciambi and Doug Glanville	Karl Ravech and Tim Kurkjian	Marc Kestecher, Kevin Winter, John Brickley or Chris Villani
2023	Karl Ravech and Tim Kurkjian	Dave O'Brien (Games 1–3); Mike Couzens (Game 4); Eduardo Pérez	Jon Sciambi and Doug Glanville	Roxy Bernstein and Jessica Mendoza	Marc Kestecher, Kevin Winter, John Brickley or Chris Villani
2024	Karl Ravech, Eduardo Pérez and Tim Kurkjian	Dave O'Brien and Gregg Olson	Jon Sciambi and Doug Glanville	Roxy Bernstein and Jessica Mendoza	Marc Kestecher, Kevin Winter, Jim Basquil or Pat O'Keefe
2025	Karl Ravech, Eduardo Pérez and Tim Kurkjian	Roxy Bernstein and Gregg Olson	Jon Sciambi and Doug Glanville	Dave O'Brien and Jessica Mendoza	Marc Kestecher, Jim Basquil or Pat O'Keefe
2026	Mike Couzens, Eduardo Pérez and Tim Kurkjian	Roxy Bernstein and Gregg Olson	Jon Sciambi and Doug Glanville	Dave O'Brien and Jessica Mendoza	Marc Kestecher, Jim Basquil, Nick DeLuca or Christine Lisi

=== League Championship Series ===
Year	ALCS	NLCS	Pregame host(s)
1998	Dan Shulman and Buck Martinez	Charley Steiner and Kevin Kennedy	Joe D'Ambrosio
1999	Ernie Harwell and Rick Sutcliffe	Charley Steiner and Dave Campbell	Joe D'Ambrosio
2000	Dan Shulman and Buck Martinez	Charley Steiner and Dave Campbell	Joe D'Ambrosio
2001	Jon Miller and Joe Morgan	Charley Steiner and Dave Campbell	Joe D'Ambrosio
2002	Jon Miller and Joe Morgan	Dan Shulman and Dave Campbell	Joe D'Ambrosio
2003	Jon Miller and Joe Morgan	Dan Shulman and Dave Campbell	Joe D'Ambrosio
2004	Jon Miller and Joe Morgan	Dan Shulman and Dave Campbell	Joe D'Ambrosio
2005	Jon Miller and Joe Morgan	Dan Shulman and Dave Campbell	Joe D'Ambrosio
2006	Jon Miller and Joe Morgan	Dan Shulman and Dave Campbell	Joe D'Ambrosio
2007	Jon Miller and Joe Morgan	Dan Shulman and Dave Campbell	Joe D'Ambrosio
2008	Jon Miller and Joe Morgan	Dan Shulman; Steve Phillips (in Los Angeles); Orel Hershiser (in Philadelphia)	Marc Kestecher
2009	Jon Miller and Joe Morgan	Dan Shulman and Dave Campbell	Marc Kestecher
2010	Jon Miller and Joe Morgan	Dan Shulman and Dave Campbell	Marc Kestecher
2011	Dan Shulman and Orel Hershiser	Jon Sciambi (Games 1–3, 6); Dave O'Brien (Games 4–5); Bobby Valentine (Games 1–4, 6); Buck Martinez (Game 5)	Marc Kestecher
2012	Dan Shulman and Orel Hershiser	Jon Sciambi and Chris Singleton	Marc Kestecher
2013	Jon Sciambi and Chris Singleton	Dan Shulman and Orel Hershiser	Marc Kestecher
2014	Jon Sciambi and Chris Singleton	Dan Shulman and Orel Hershiser	Marc Kestecher
2015	Dan Shulman and Aaron Boone	Jon Sciambi and Chris Singleton	Marc Kestecher
2016	Jon Sciambi and Chris Singleton	Dan Shulman and Aaron Boone	Marc Kestecher
2017	Jon Sciambi and Chris Singleton	Dan Shulman and Aaron Boone	Marc Kestecher, Kevin Winter or John Brickley
2018	Jon Sciambi and Jessica Mendoza	Dan Shulman and Chris Singleton	Marc Kestecher, Kevin Winter, John Brickley or Jim Basquil
2019	Dan Shulman and Chris Singleton	Jon Sciambi and Jessica Mendoza	Marc Kestecher, Kevin Winter, John Brickley, Chris Villani or Jim Basquil
2020	Dan Shulman and Chris Singleton	Jon Sciambi and Jessica Mendoza	Marc Kestecher, Kevin Winter, John Brickley, Chris Villani or Jim Basquil
2021	Dan Shulman and Eduardo Pérez	Jon Sciambi and Jessica Mendoza	Kevin Winter, John Brickley, Chris Villani or Jim Basquil
2022	Dan Shulman and Eduardo Pérez	Jon Sciambi and Doug Glanville	Kevin Winter, John Brickley, Chris Villani or Jim Basquil
2023	Karl Ravech, Eduardo Pérez and Tim Kurkjian	Jon Sciambi and Doug Glanville	Kevin Winter, John Brickley, Chris Villani or Jim Basquil
2024	Karl Ravech, Eduardo Pérez and Tim Kurkjian	Jon Sciambi and Doug Glanville	Kevin Winter, Jim Basquil or Pat O'Keefe
2025	Karl Ravech, Eduardo Pérez and Tim Kurkjian	Jon Sciambi and Doug Glanville	Jim Basquil or Pat O'Keefe
2026	Mike Couzens and Eduardo Pérez	Jon Sciambi and Doug Glanville	Jim Basquil or Pat O'Keefe

=== World Series ===
Year	Play-by-Play	Color commentator(s)	Sideline reporter(s)	Pregame host(s)	Pregame analyst(s)
1998	Jon Miller	Joe Morgan		Charley Steiner	Kevin Kennedy
1999	Jon Miller	Rick Sutcliffe		Charley Steiner	Dave Campbell
2000	Jon Miller; Charley Steiner (Game 3)	Dave Campbell		Charley Steiner	
2001	Jon Miller	Joe Morgan		Charley Steiner	Dave Campbell
2002	Jon Miller	Joe Morgan		Dan Shulman	Dave Campbell
2003	Jon Miller	Joe Morgan		Dan Shulman	Dave Campbell
2004	Jon Miller	Joe Morgan		Dan Shulman	Dave Campbell
2005	Jon Miller	Joe Morgan		Dan Shulman	Dave Campbell
2006	Jon Miller	Joe Morgan		Dan Shulman	Dave Campbell and Peter Pascarelli
2007	Jon Miller	Joe Morgan		Jon Sciambi	Dave Campbell and Peter Pascarelli
2008	Jon Miller	Joe Morgan		Jon Sciambi	Dave Campbell and Peter Pascarelli
2009	Jon Miller	Joe Morgan		Jon Sciambi	Dave Campbell and Peter Pascarelli
2010	Jon Miller	Joe Morgan		Marc Kestecher	Jon Sciambi, Dave Campbell, and Peter Pascarelli
2011	Dan Shulman	Orel Hershiser and Bobby Valentine		Marc Kestecher	Jon Sciambi, Chris Singleton, and Peter Pascarelli
2012	Dan Shulman	Orel Hershiser		Marc Kestecher	Jon Sciambi, Chris Singleton, and Peter Pascarelli
2013	Dan Shulman	Orel Hershiser		Marc Kestecher	Jon Sciambi, Chris Singleton, and Peter Pascarelli
2014	Dan Shulman	Aaron Boone		Marc Kestecher	Jon Sciambi, Chris Singleton, and Peter Pascarelli
2015	Dan Shulman	Aaron Boone		Marc Kestecher	Chris Singleton and Peter Pascarelli
2016	Dan Shulman	Aaron Boone		Marc Kestecher	Chris Singleton, Buster Olney, and Tim Kurkjian
2017	Dan Shulman	Aaron Boone		Marc Kestecher	Chris Singleton, Buster Olney, and Tim Kurkjian
2018	Dan Shulman (Games 1–4); Jon Sciambi (Game 5)	Chris Singleton	Buster Olney	Marc Kestecher	Buster Olney and Tim Kurkjian
2019	Dan Shulman	Chris Singleton	Buster Olney	Marc Kestecher or Kevin Winter	Buster Olney and Tim Kurkjian
2020	Dan Shulman	Chris Singleton and Jessica Mendoza	Buster Olney	Marc Kestecher	
2021	Dan Shulman	Jessica Mendoza and Eduardo Pérez	Buster Olney	Kevin Winter	Chris Singleton, Buster Olney, and Marly Rivera
2022	Dan Shulman	Jessica Mendoza and Eduardo Pérez	Buster Olney	Kevin Winter	Doug Glanville, Buster Olney, and Marly Rivera
2023	Jon Sciambi	Jessica Mendoza and Eduardo Pérez	Buster Olney	Kevin Winter	Doug Glanville and Buster Olney
2024	Jon Sciambi	Jessica Mendoza and Eduardo Pérez	Buster Olney	Kevin Winter	Doug Glanville and Buster Olney
2025	Jon Sciambi	Jessica Mendoza and Eduardo Pérez	Buster Olney	Jim Basquil	Doug Glanville and Buster Olney
2026	Jon Sciambi	Jessica Mendoza and Eduardo Pérez	Buster Olney	Jim Basquil	Doug Glanville and Buster Olney

=== World Baseball Classic Semis and Championship ===
Year	Play-by-Play	Color commentator(s)	Pregame host
2006	Dan Shulman	Dave Campbell	Joe D'Ambrosio
2009	Jon Sciambi	Dave Campbell	Joe D'Ambrosio
2013	Jon Sciambi	Chris Singleton	John Brickley
2017	Dave Flemming	Chris Singleton	John Brickley
2023	Roxy Bernstein	Chris Singleton	Kevin Winter

== See also ==
- ESPN Major League Baseball
- Major League Baseball on ABC
- Baseball Tonight
- Sunday Night Baseball
- Monday Night Baseball
- Wednesday Night Baseball
- Major League Baseball on ESPN Radio
- List of ESPN Major League Baseball broadcasters
- List of Major League Baseball on ABC announcers
