= List of Major League Baseball wild card round broadcasters =

The following is a list of the national television and radio networks and announcers that have broadcast the Major League Baseball wild card games throughout the years. It does not include any announcers who may have appeared on local radio broadcasts produced by the participating teams.

== Television ==
=== 2020s ===
==== Wild card series ====
Year	League	Series	Network	Play-by-play	Color commentator(s)	Field reporter(s)
2026	AL	Houston Astros/Chicago White Sox	Peacock/NBCSN	Tom McCarthy	Steve Stone, Geoff Blum and Adam Ottavino	Britney Eurton
2026	AL	New York Yankees/Boston Red Sox	NBC/Peacock	Jason Benetti	Lou Merloni, Joe Girardi and Anthony Rizzo	Caroline Pineda
2026	NL	Atlanta Braves/Philadelphia Phillies	NBC/Peacock	Matt Vasgersian	John Kruk, C. J. Nitkowski and Joey Votto	Ashley ShahAhmadi
2026	NL	San Diego Padres/Chicago Cubs	Peacock/NBCSN	Dave Flemming	Jim Deshaies, Mark Grant and Clayton Kershaw	John Fanta
2025	AL	Cleveland Guardians/Detroit Tigers	ESPN (Games 1–2)	Sean McDonough	Todd Frazier	Taylor McGregor
2025	AL	Cleveland Guardians/Detroit Tigers	ABC (Game 3)	Sean McDonough	Todd Frazier	Taylor McGregor
2025	AL	New York Yankees/Boston Red Sox	ESPN	Karl Ravech	David Cone and Eduardo Pérez	Buster Olney
2025	NL	Los Angeles Dodgers/Cincinnati Reds	ESPN	Jon Sciambi	Doug Glanville	Alden Gonzalez
2025	NL	Chicago Cubs/San Diego Padres	ABC (Games 1–2)	Kevin Brown	Jessica Mendoza and Ben McDonald	Jesse Rogers
2025	NL	Chicago Cubs/San Diego Padres	ESPN (Game 3)	Kevin Brown	Jessica Mendoza and Ben McDonald	Jesse Rogers
2024	AL	Houston Astros/Detroit Tigers	ABC	Michael Kay	Todd Frazier and Tim Kurkjian	Alden González
2024	AL	Baltimore Orioles/Kansas City Royals	ESPN2 (Game 1); ESPN (Game 2)	Sean McDonough	Jessica Mendoza and Ben McDonald	Jeff Passan
2024	NL	Milwaukee Brewers/New York Mets	ESPN	Jon Sciambi	Doug Glanville	Jesse Rogers
2024	NL	San Diego Padres/Atlanta Braves	ESPN (Game 1); ESPN2 (Game 2)	Karl Ravech	David Cone and Eduardo Pérez	Buster Olney
2023	AL	Minnesota Twins/Toronto Blue Jays	ESPN (U.S.)	Michael Kay	Alex Rodriguez	Alden González
2023	AL	Minnesota Twins/Toronto Blue Jays	Sportsnet (Canada)	Dan Shulman	Buck Martinez	Hazel Mae
2023	AL	Tampa Bay Rays/Texas Rangers	ABC	Sean McDonough	Jessica Mendoza and Tim Kurkjian	Coley Harvey
2023	NL	Milwaukee Brewers/Arizona Diamondbacks	ESPN2	Jon Sciambi	Doug Glanville	Jesse Rogers
2023	NL	Philadelphia Phillies/Miami Marlins	ESPN	Karl Ravech	David Cone and Eduardo Pérez	Buster Olney
2022	AL	Cleveland Guardians/Tampa Bay Rays	ESPN (Game 1); ESPN2 (Game 2)	Jon Sciambi	Doug Glanville	Jesse Rogers
2022	AL	Toronto Blue Jays/Seattle Mariners	ESPN (U.S.)	Dave Flemming	Jessica Mendoza and Tim Kurkjian	Coley Harvey
2022	AL	Toronto Blue Jays/Seattle Mariners	Sportsnet (Canada)	Buck Martinez	Pat Tabler	Hazel Mae
2022	NL	St. Louis Cardinals/Philadelphia Phillies	ABC (Game 1); ESPN2 (Game 2)	Michael Kay	Alex Rodriguez	Alden González
2022	NL	New York Mets/San Diego Padres	ESPN	Karl Ravech	David Cone and Eduardo Pérez	Buster Olney

==== Wild card game ====
Year	Game	Network	Play-by-play	Color commentator(s)	Field reporter(s)
2021	AL	ESPN	Matt Vasgersian	Jessica Mendoza and Alex Rodriguez	Buster Olney
2021	AL	ESPN2 (Statcast alternate broadcast)	Jason Benetti	Eduardo Pérez and Mike Petriello	
2021	NL	TBS	Brian Anderson	Ron Darling	Lauren Shehadi

=== 2020 wild card series ===
League	Series	Network	Play-by-play	Color commentator(s)	Field reporter(s)
AL	Tampa Bay Rays/Toronto Blue Jays	TBS (U.S.)	Rich Waltz	Jimmy Rollins	
AL	Tampa Bay Rays/Toronto Blue Jays	Sportsnet (Canada)	Rich Waltz	Jimmy Rollins	
AL	Minnesota Twins/Houston Astros	ABC (Game 1); ESPN2 (Game 2)	Karl Ravech	Tim Kurkjian and Eduardo Pérez	
AL	New York Yankees/Cleveland Indians	ESPN	Matt Vasgersian	Alex Rodriguez and Buster Olney	Marly Rivera
AL	Oakland Athletics/Chicago White Sox	ESPN	Dave Flemming	Jessica Mendoza	
NL	Los Angeles Dodgers/Milwaukee Brewers	ESPN	Karl Ravech	Tim Kurkjian and Eduardo Pérez	
NL	Atlanta Braves/Cincinnati Reds	ESPN	Matt Vasgersian	Alex Rodriguez and Buster Olney	Kiley McDaniel
NL	Chicago Cubs/Miami Marlins	ABC	Jon Sciambi	Chipper Jones	Jesse Rogers
NL	San Diego Padres/St. Louis Cardinals	ESPN2 (Game 1); ESPN (Games 2 and 3)	Tom Hart	Rick Sutcliffe; Jessica Mendoza (Game 3)	Pedro Gomez

==== Notes ====
- ABC was scheduled to air at least four of the 24 possible daytime games in the 2020 season's one-time only expanded eight-series wild card round, that the networks of ESPN will air. Not only did this mean that ABC would be airing Major League Baseball games of any kind since Game 5 of the 1995 World Series, but it would mark the first time since NBC's final game in 2000, that a Major League Baseball game had aired on any broadcast network other than Fox. The first game to definitely air on ABC on September 29, would be the #6 seed Houston Astros against the #3 Minnesota Twins from Target Field in Minneapolis. The following day, ABC would air the #6 Miami Marlins against the #3 Chicago Cubs from Wrigley Field in Chicago. Karl Ravech provided play-by-play commentary for the Houston-Minnesota game with analysts Eduardo Pérez and Tim Kurkjian. Meanwhile, Jon Sciambi, Chipper Jones, and Jesse Rogers called the Miami-Chicago Cubs game on September 30. ESPN also planned on utilizing ABC afternoon window on Friday (October 2). On October 2, ABC cut away from their broadcast Miami-Chicago Cubs game during the top of the 9th inning to deliver a special report on U.S. president Donald Trump being taken to Walter Reed National Military Medical Center for COVID-19 treatment. The conclusion of the game was shifted to ESPN.
- Beginning with the 2022 postseason, MLB allowed Sportsnet, the home network of the Toronto Blue Jays, to produce their own broadcasts of the team's games in Canada rather than a mere simulcast of the American network feed or an MLB International-produced broadcast.
- Starting in 2026, and for the first time since 2013, ESPN carried no postseason games under a restructured three-year contract they signed with Major League Baseball. The Wild Card Series moved to NBC Sports under a three-year deal. Under NBC, their broadcast format consists of a play-by-play announcer, team-centric game analysts, and a field level analyst (Inside the Pitch) specializing in analysis of key at bats.

=== 2010s ===
Year	Game	Network	Play-by-play	Color commentator(s)	Field reporter(s)
2019	AL	ESPN	Matt Vasgersian	Jessica Mendoza and Alex Rodriguez	Buster Olney
2019	AL	ESPN2 (Statcast alternate broadcast)	Jason Benetti	Eduardo Pérez and Mike Petriello	
2019	NL	TBS	Ernie Johnson	Ron Darling and Jeff Francoeur	Lauren Shehadi
2018	AL	TBS	Brian Anderson	Ron Darling and Dennis Eckersley	Lauren Shehadi
2018	NL	ESPN	Matt Vasgersian	Jessica Mendoza and Alex Rodriguez	Buster Olney
2018	NL	ESPN2 (Statcast alternate broadcast)	Jason Benetti	Eduardo Pérez and Mike Petriello	
2017	AL	ESPN	Dan Shulman	Jessica Mendoza and Aaron Boone	Buster Olney
2017	NL	TBS	Ernie Johnson	Ron Darling	Sam Ryan
2016	AL	TBS (U.S.)	Ernie Johnson	Ron Darling and Cal Ripken	Sam Ryan
2016	AL	Sportsnet (Canada)	Ernie Johnson	Ron Darling and Cal Ripken	Sam Ryan
2016	NL	ESPN	Dan Shulman	Jessica Mendoza and Aaron Boone	Buster Olney
2015	AL	ESPN	Dan Shulman	John Kruk and Jessica Mendoza	Buster Olney and Tim Kurkjian
2015	NL	TBS	Ernie Johnson	Ron Darling and Cal Ripken	Matt Winer
2014	AL	TBS	Ernie Johnson	Ron Darling and Cal Ripken	Matt Winer
2014	NL	ESPN	Dan Shulman	John Kruk	Buster Olney and Tim Kurkjian
2013	AL	TBS	Brian Anderson	Joe Simpson and John Smoltz	Rachel Nichols
2013	NL	TBS	Ernie Johnson	Ron Darling and Cal Ripken	Craig Sager
2012	AL	TBS	Ernie Johnson	John Smoltz and Cal Ripken	Craig Sager
2012	NL	TBS	Brian Anderson	Joe Simpson and Ron Darling	Tom Verducci

== Radio ==
=== 2020s ===
==== Wild card series ====
Year	League	Series	Network	Play-by-play	Color commentator(s)
2026	AL	Houston Astros/Chicago White Sox	ESPN	Roxy Bernstein	Gregg Olson
2026	AL	New York Yankees/Boston Red Sox	ESPN	Michael Kay	Eduardo Pérez and Tim Kurkjian
2026	NL	Atlanta Braves/Philadelphia Phillies	ESPN	Dave O'Brien	Jessica Mendoza
2026	NL	San Diego Padres/Chicago Cubs	ESPN	Jon Sciambi	Doug Glanville
2025	AL	Cleveland Guardians/Detroit Tigers	ESPN	Mike Ferrin	Kyle Peterson
2025	AL	New York Yankees/Boston Red Sox	ESPN	Roxy Bernstein	Gregg Olson
2025	NL	Los Angeles Dodgers/Cincinnati Reds	ESPN	Tom Hart	Tim Kurkjian
2025	NL	Chicago Cubs/San Diego Padres	ESPN	Mike Couzens	Chris Burke
2024	AL	Houston Astros/Detroit Tigers	ESPN	Dave O'Brien	Will Middlebrooks
2024	AL	Baltimore Orioles/Kansas City Royals	ESPN	Mike Monaco	Rubén Amaro Jr.
2024	NL	Milwaukee Brewers/New York Mets	ESPN	Mike Couzens	Chris Burke
2024	NL	San Diego Padres/Atlanta Braves	ESPN	Roxy Bernstein	Gregg Olson
2023	AL	Minnesota Twins/Toronto Blue Jays	ESPN	Dave O'Brien	Kyle Peterson
2023	AL	Tampa Bay Rays/Texas Rangers	ESPN	Mike Monaco	Todd Frazier
2023	NL	Milwaukee Brewers/Arizona Diamondbacks	ESPN	Roxy Bernstein	Gregg Olson
2023	NL	Philadelphia Phillies/Miami Marlins	ESPN	Mike Couzens	Chris Burke
2022	AL	Cleveland Guardians/Tampa Bay Rays	ESPN	Dave O'Brien	Marly Rivera
2022	AL	Toronto Blue Jays/Seattle Mariners	ESPN	Dan Shulman	Gregg Olson
2022	NL	St. Louis Cardinals/Philadelphia Phillies	ESPN	Roxy Bernstein	Kyle Peterson
2022	NL	New York Mets/San Diego Padres	ESPN	Kevin Brown	Chris Burke

==== Wild card game ====
Year	Game	Network	Play-by-play	Color commentator(s)
2021	AL	ESPN	Dave O'Brien	Xavier Scruggs
2021	NL	ESPN	Jon Sciambi	Kyle Peterson

=== 2020 wild card series ===
League	Series	Network	Play-by-play	Color commentator(s)
AL	Tampa Bay Rays/Toronto Blue Jays	ESPN	Dan Shulman	Chris Burke
AL	Minnesota Twins/Houston Astros	ESPN	Kevin Brown	Chris Singleton
AL	New York Yankees/Cleveland Indians	ESPN	Dave O'Brien	Chris Singleton
AL	Oakland Athletics/Chicago White Sox	ESPN	Jon Sciambi	Jim Bowden
NL	Los Angeles Dodgers/Milwaukee Brewers	ESPN	Dan Shulman	Jim Bowden
NL	Chicago Cubs/Miami Marlins	ESPN	Kevin Brown	Jim Bowden
NL	San Diego Padres/St. Louis Cardinals	ESPN	Dave O'Brien	Chris Singleton

=== 2010s ===
Year	Game	Network	Play-by-play	Color commentator(s)
2019	AL	ESPN	Dan Shulman	Chris Singleton
2019	NL	ESPN	Jon Sciambi	Jim Bowden
2018	AL	ESPN	Jon Sciambi	Eduardo Pérez
2018	NL	ESPN	Dan Shulman	Chris Singleton
2017	AL	ESPN	Jon Sciambi	Chris Singleton
2017	NL	ESPN	Adam Amin	Eduardo Pérez
2016	AL	ESPN	Jon Sciambi	Chris Singleton
2016	NL	ESPN	Dave O'Brien	Jim Bowden
2015	AL	ESPN	Dave O'Brien	Aaron Boone
2015	NL	ESPN	Jon Sciambi	Chris Singleton
2014	AL	ESPN	Jon Sciambi	Chris Singleton
2014	NL	ESPN	Dave O'Brien	Aaron Boone
2013	AL	ESPN	Jon Sciambi	Chris Singleton
2013	NL	ESPN	Dan Shulman	Orel Hershiser
2012	AL	ESPN	Dan Shulman	Orel Hershiser
2012	NL	ESPN	Jon Sciambi	Chris Singleton
