= List of Major League Baseball on ABC announcers =

== 1950s ==
=== 1953–1954 Saturday afternoon Game of the Week period ===
- Buddy Blattner
- Dizzy Dean
- Gene Kirby

=== 1959 National League tie-breaker series ===
- George Kell
- Bob DeLaney

== 1960s ==
=== 1960 Saturday afternoon Game of the Week period ===
- Jack Buck
- Carl Erskine

=== 1965 Saturday afternoon Game of the Week period ===
- Ken Coleman
- Leo Durocher
- Carl Erskine
- Merle Harmon
- Tommy Henrich
- Keith Jackson
- Jackie Robinson
- Chris Schenkel
- Warren Spahn
- Bob Wolff

== 1976–1988 Monday Night Baseball ==
- Johnny Bench (1978; 1986)
- Gary Bender (1987–1988)
- Lou Brock (1980)
- Steve Busby (1986)
- Norm Cash (1976)
- Don Chevrier (1983)
- Howard Cosell (1976–1985)
- Don Drysdale (1978–1986)
- Mark Fidrych (1977)
- Bill Flemming (1978)
- Bob Gibson (1976–1978)
- Keith Jackson (1976–1982; 1986)
- Reggie Jackson (1976; 1984; 1988)
- Tommy John (1985)
- Jim Lampley (1977–1978; 1980)
- Tommy Lasorda (1982)
- Sal Marchiano (1978)
- Billy Martin (1980)
- Tim McCarver (1983–1989)
- Al Michaels (1976–1989)
- Joe Morgan (1988–1989)
- Jim Palmer (1978; 1981; 1984–1989)
- Bob Prince (1976)
- Tom Seaver (1977)
- Steve Stone (1982–1983)
- Gary Thorne (1989)
- Bob Uecker (1976–1982)
- Earl Weaver (1982–1984)
- Bill White (1977–1978)
- Warner Wolf (1976–1977)
- Steve Zabriskie (1979–1981)

== 1989 Thursday Night Baseball ==
- Tim McCarver (1983–1989)
- Al Michaels (1976–1989)
- Joe Morgan (1988–1989)
- Jim Palmer (1978; 1981; 1984–1989)
- Gary Thorne (1989)

== 2020–present (ESPN productions) ==
=== 2020 MLB American League Wild Card Series ===
Houston Astros vs. Minnesota Twins (9/29)

- Karl Ravech
- Eduardo Pérez
- Tim Kurkjian

=== 2020 MLB National League Wild Card Series ===
Miami Marlins vs. Chicago Cubs (9/30 and 10/2)

- Jon Sciambi
- Chipper Jones
- Jesse Rogers

=== 2021 Sunday Night Baseball ===
Chicago White Sox vs. Chicago Cubs (8/8)

- Matt Vasgersian
- Alex Rodriguez
- Buster Olney

=== 2022 MLB National League Wild Card Series ===
Philadelphia Phillies vs. St. Louis Cardinals (10/7)

- Michael Kay
- Alex Rodriguez
- Alden Gonzalez

=== 2023 MLB American League Wild Card Series ===
Tampa Bay Rays vs. Texas Rangers (10/3–10/4)

- Sean McDonough
- Tim Kurkjian
- Jessica Mendoza
- Coley Harvey

=== 2024 MLB American League Wild Card Series ===
Houston Astros vs. Detroit Tigers (10/1–10/2)

- Michael Kay
- Tim Kurkjian
- Todd Frazier
- Alden Gonzalez

=== 2025 MLB National League Wild Card Series ===
San Diego Padres vs. Chicago Cubs (9/30–10/1)

- Kevin Brown
- Jessica Mendoza
- Ben McDonald
- Jesse Rodgers

=== 2025 MLB American League Wild Card Series ===
Detroit Tigers vs. Cleveland Guardians (10/2)

- Sean McDonough
- Todd Frazier
- Taylor McGregor

=== 2026 Saturday Afternoon Baseball ===
New York Yankees vs. Boston Red Sox (6/27)

- Karl Ravech
- David Ross
- Eduardo Perez
- Buster Olney

=== 2026 Sunday Afternoon Baseball ===
Chicago Cubs vs. San Francisco Giants (6/14)

- Jon Sciambi
- David Ross
- Buster Olney

St. Louis Cardinals vs. Chicago Cubs (8/16)

- Jon Sciambi
- David Ross
- Eduardo Perez
- Buster Olney

== Other ABC Major League Baseball announcers ==
- Jim Kaat
- Reggie Jackson

Note: During the spare time of his active career, Reggie Jackson worked as a field reporter and color commentator for ABC Sports. During the 1980s (1983, 1985, and 1987 respectively), Jackson was given the task of presiding over the World Series Trophy presentations.

- Tommy Lasorda
- Billy Martin
- Brent Musburger
- Tom Seaver
- Lesley Visser

== See also ==
- List of current Major League Baseball broadcasters
- List of ESPN Major League Baseball broadcasters
- List of Major League Baseball on ESPN Radio broadcasters
- The Baseball Network announcers
