= Baseball Sunday =

Baseball Sunday was a 1980s era nationally syndicated call-in sports talk radio program, created and produced by William Foard and distributed via satellite on the Foard Entertainment Network. The original cast included host Kevin Harlan, with former New York Yankee player and Baltimore Orioles manager, Hank Bauer and statistician John Matthews.

== Format ==
The basic format of Baseball Sunday involved a round table chat about the goings on in Major League Baseball at the time. The hosts would also take calls from the listeners. Radio highlights from that particular Sunday's Major League Baseball action would be mixed in for good measure. Baseball Sunday was a precursor of sorts to ESPN's Baseball Tonight, which debuted in 1990.

== Hosts ==
As previously mentioned, the initial host of Baseball Sunday was Kevin Harlan, who was also joined by regulars Bill James and Hal Bodley (of USA Today). Around 1990, Harlan left the program and was replaced by Joe Garagiola. What then became known as Baseball Sunday with Joe Garagiola was created by Shane Hackett and Miles McMillan. It was owned and produced by United Syndications Associates and aired on over 200 radio stations.

== Sources ==
- Don Orsillo and Joe Simpson
