= Steve Berthiaume =

American television sportscaster

Steven Berthiaume
- Broadcaster

Teams
- As Broadcaster: New York Mets (2006); Arizona Diamondbacks (2012–2026)

Steve Berthiaume (/bɜːrθˈjuːm/) is an American television sportscaster who is the former play-by-play broadcast announcer for the Arizona Diamondbacks and is a former anchor on ESPN and a former sportscaster for SportsNet New York (SNY).

== Broadcasting career ==
=== Early career ===
A graduate of Emerson College, Berthiaume's broadcasting career began at various stations in the southern United States, including WVIR-TV in Charlottesville, Virginia; WIS-TV in Columbia, South Carolina; WJAR-TV in Providence, Rhode Island; and WEAR-TV in Pensacola, Florida. Berthiaume was hired from Pensacola by WTIC-TV in Hartford, Connecticut, in 1993; station management dismissed him in January 1996 due to what Berthiaume described as a disagreement over presentation styles. He then went on to the short-lived CNN/SI cable channel when it launched in December 1996 and to ESPN in 1999, starting at ESPNEWS and later anchoring for SportsCenter.

In 2006, Berthiaume left ESPN to become chief sportscaster at SNY, a new regional sports network started by the New York Mets; however, in late January 2007, SNY let Berthiaume out of his contract to rejoin ESPN on March 28, 2007, in order to work closer to his wife. He also served as a host of Baseball Tonight.

In 2012, Berthiaume was hired by MLB's Arizona Diamondbacks to serve as a play-by-play broadcaster for Fox Sports Arizona beginning in the 2013 season, replacing Daron Sutton, whom the team had suspended. Berthiaume's previous play-by-play experience comes from ESPN, where he had called several professional games as well as the College World Series. On October 5, 2026 it was announced that Berthiaume's contract would not be renewed, ending his 14 year run as the lead play-by-play announcer for the Diamondbacks.
