= Joe D'Ambrosio =

American sportscaster

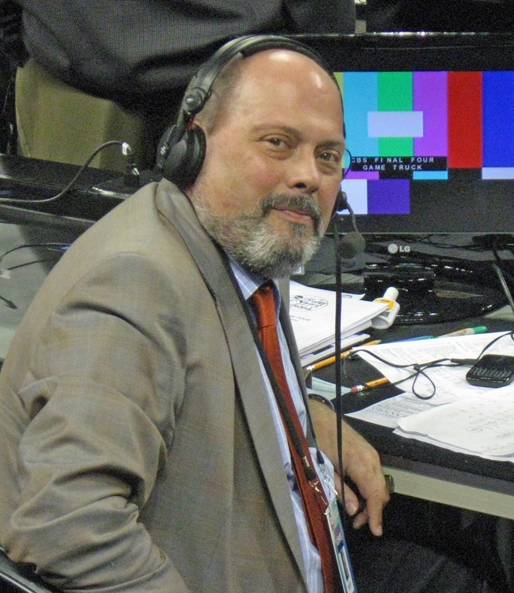
- D'Ambrosio at the 2011 NCAA Men's Final Four in Houston, Texas
- Born: July 19, 1953 (age 72); Hartford, Connecticut, U.S.
- Occupations: Play-by-play announcer, sports anchor, sports talk-show host

Joe D'Ambrosio (born July 19, 1953, in Hartford, Connecticut) is an American sports broadcaster and play-by-play announcer.

== Career ==
Known as “the Voice of the Huskies,” D'Ambrosio was the play-by-play announcer for the University of Connecticut’s football and men's basketball games on WTIC (AM) NewsTalk 1080 (www.wtic.com) since 1992. He also broadcasts select UConn baseball, soccer, and women's basketball games. In April 2014, D'Ambrosio called his fourth NCAA Men's Division I Basketball Championship with the University of Connecticut. He has been the play-by-play voice for a total of eight NCAA basketball national championships, including his years as the voice of the UConn women's basketball team D'Ambrosio was replaced as the UConn play by play voice after the 2017-2018 season's when the broadcast rights were awarded to ESPN Radio in Hartford.

Currently, D'Ambrosio does morning sports on WTIC Radio and co hosts the WTIC Morning Show with Ray Dunaway.

In October 2018, he joined WTIC-TV as a part time sports anchor, hosting the Friday Edition of the "Fox 61 Sports Ticket". He also calls UConn men's ice hockey and baseball on Fox 61.

D’Ambrosio was heard nationally on ESPN Radio as a SportsCenter update anchor. He has been affiliated with ESPN radio since 1996, and during his tenure there has hosted shows including MLB on ESPN Radio and Countdown to Kickoff, and he has covered major sporting events including several Super Bowls, Bowl Championship Series, World Series, and Major League Baseball All-Star Games. For more than ten years, he has held the unusual distinction of being employed by the corporations owning ABC (ESPN), NBC (WVIT-TV), and CBS (WTIC AM) simultaneously. "Joe D" began his career on WLIS radio in Old Saybrook, Connecticut, where he worked as a DJ and hosted the popular oldies show "Twilight Time." He was also their sports announcer and started broadcasting for the Huskies for the Connecticut Radio Network while with WLIS.

For three seasons (2009 - 2011), D'Ambrosio was a member of the broadcast team of the New Britain Rock Cats, doing both color commentary and play-by-play alongside long-time Rock Cats Director of Broadcasting, Jeff Dooley.

=== Honors ===
He has been named Connecticut Sportscaster of the Year nine times by the National Sportscasters and Sportswriters Association, now known as the National Sports Media Association. In 2003, Dick Vitale named D’Ambrosio to his "All-Cawood Ledford Team," Vitale's own "Sweet Sixteen" list of the best college play-by-play announcers.
