= Duke Castiglione =

American news anchor (born 1973)

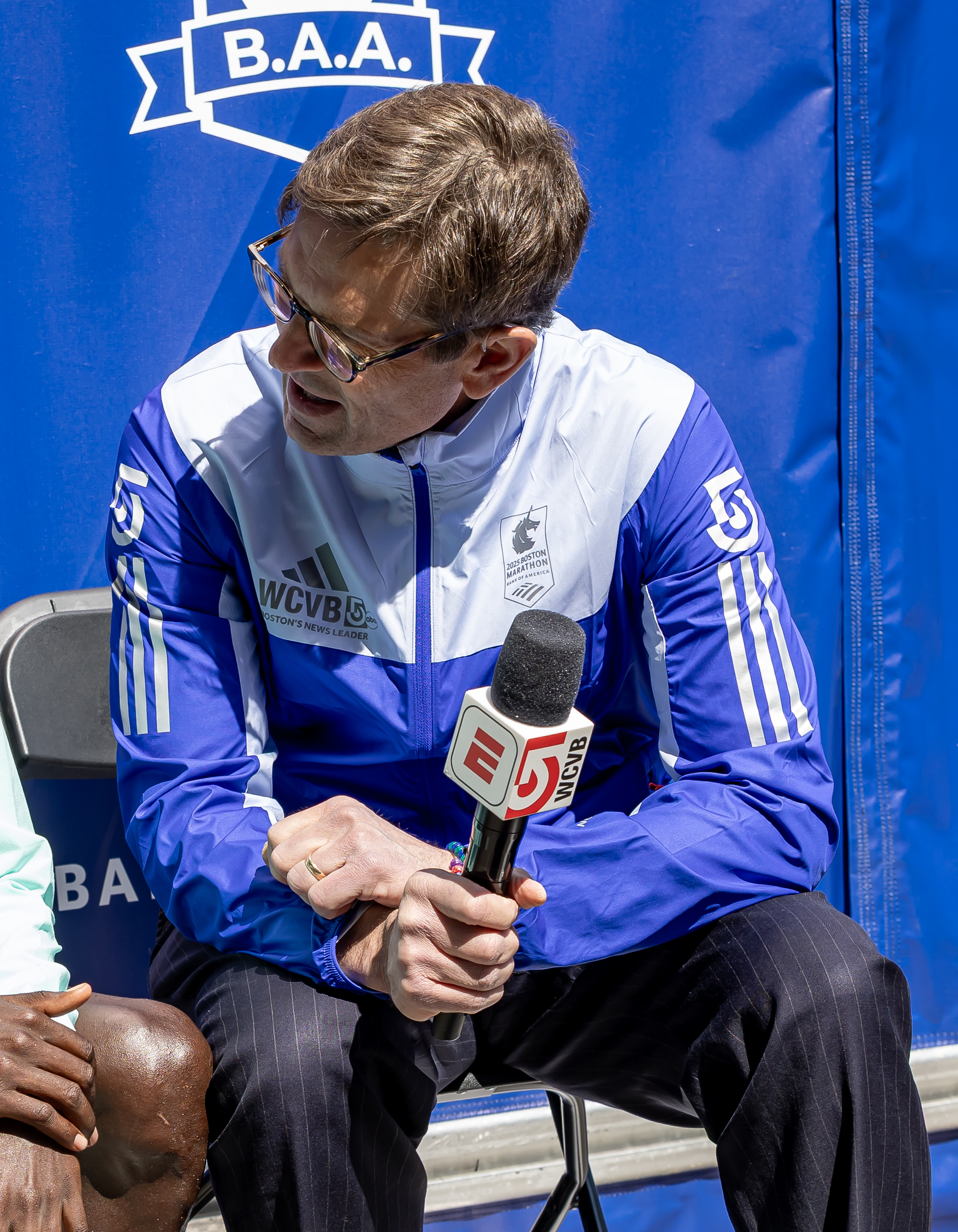
Castiglione covering the 2025 Boston Marathon

Joseph "Duke" Castiglione Jr. (born June 21, 1973) is an American news anchor for WCVB-TV Boston’s NewsCenter 5 weekday newscasts. He was the sports journalist, and sports anchor for WNYW Fox 5 Good Day New York in New York City. He also was the host of Sports Extra on Sunday at 10:30 p.m. Before WNYW, he worked as a fill-in sports anchor and reporter at WHDH-TV, the now-former NBC affiliate in Boston. He also worked at WCBS-TV CBS 2 in New York, where he was the weekday morning sports anchor until 2006. His first New York job was hosting Sports on 1, a nightly call-in show, for the NY1 local network, beginning in 2000. He was a field reporter for ESPN's baseball coverage during the 2005 and 2006 seasons.

He began his broadcasting career at WGGB-TV, the ABC affiliate in Springfield, Massachusetts. Castiglione has landed a number of key breaking news interviews, including one with Joe Torre on the day he was rumored to be fired and the first one-on-one with Johnny Damon when he joined the New York Yankees. He is a recipient of the Associated Press award for Best Sports Show and two Black Journalist Awards for his interviews with Lawrence Taylor and Bernard King. He graduated from Stonehill College in 1996.

Duke Castiglione grew up in Marshfield, Massachusetts, where he spent time as a substitute teacher at the town's high school. He is the son of retired Boston Red Sox radio commentator Joe Castiglione.
