= Doug Glanville =

American baseball player and analyst (born 1970)

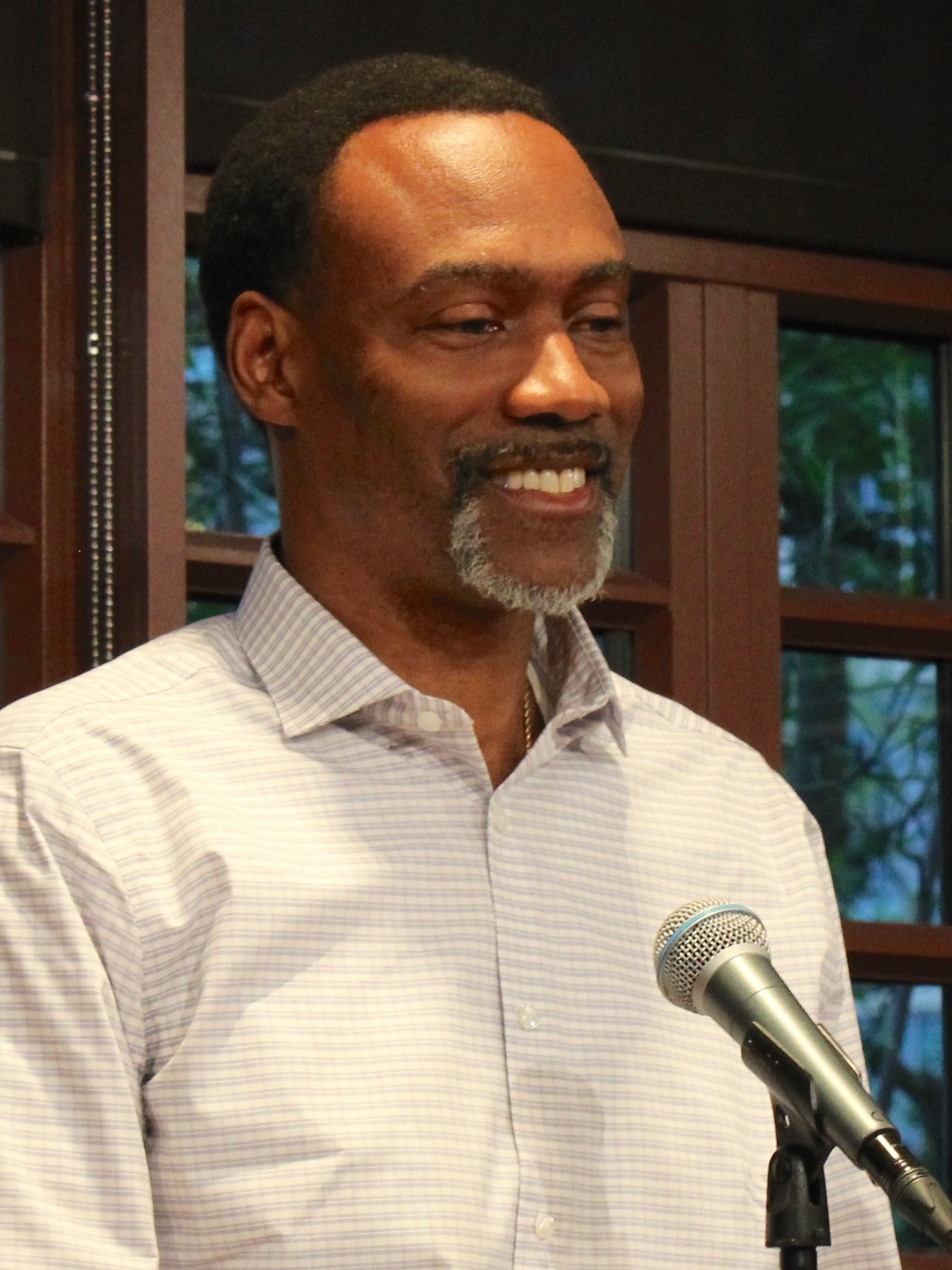
- Glanville in 2022
- Center fielder
- Born: August 25, 1970 (age 56); Hackensack, New Jersey, U.S.
- Batted: Right Threw: Right

MLB debut
- June 9, 1996, for the Chicago Cubs

Last MLB appearance
- October 3, 2004, for the Philadelphia Phillies

MLB statistics
- Batting average: .277
- Home runs: 59
- Runs batted in: 333
- Stats at Baseball Reference

Teams
- Chicago Cubs (1996–1997); Philadelphia Phillies (1998–2002); Texas Rangers (2003); Chicago Cubs (2003); Philadelphia Phillies (2004)

Douglas Metunwa Glanville (born August 25, 1970) is an American former professional baseball outfielder who played in Major League Baseball (MLB) for the Philadelphia Phillies, Chicago Cubs, and Texas Rangers. He is also a broadcast color analyst for baseball, currently working with Marquee Sports Network and ESPN, and a contributor to The Athletic.

== Early life and education ==
Glanville grew up in Teaneck, New Jersey, where he attended Teaneck High School, graduating in 1988. His mother was a math teacher and his father a psychiatrist. He was a childhood friend of future basketball coach Lawrence Frank.

Glanville attended the University of Pennsylvania, where he majored in systems engineering. He is one of only five Penn alumni to play in Major League Baseball since 1951, and the first African-American Ivy League graduate to play in the majors. In 1990, he played collegiate summer baseball with the Wareham Gatemen of the Cape Cod Baseball League, and received the league's Outstanding Pro Prospect award.

== Career ==
=== Professional baseball ===
Glanville played center field for the Indios de Mayagüez for two seasons. In his first season, he was named MVP of the Puerto Rico Winter League over Roberto Alomar. In 1999, with the Philadelphia Phillies, Glanville batted .325 and hit 11 homers while driving in 73 runs, stole 34 bases, and placed second in the National League (NL) behind Luis Gonzalez in hits with 204. He was registered double-digit outfield assists on three occasions during and ended his career going 293 consecutive games without a fielding error. In the 11th inning of Game 3 of the 2003 NL Championship Series, he hit the game-winning triple for the Cubs.

In 2005, with no immediate prospects of joining an MLB roster, Glanville signed a one-day minor league contract with the Phillies, and then retired, saying he wanted to leave baseball wearing the uniform of the team that he grew up as a fan of, and to which he gave most of his playing career. He had 1,100 career hits.

Glanville is a consultant with Baseball Factory, a high-school player development program, and writes guest columns for The New York Times and ESPN.com on baseball and sports. On April 1, 2010, he joined ESPN as a baseball color analyst. While at ESPN, Glanville appeared on Wednesday Night Baseball and contributed to Baseball Tonight, ESPN Radio, ESPN.com, and ESPN The Magazine. On April 27, 2017, it was revealed that he was to be among the many layoffs ESPN had made. He was hired by NBC Sports Chicago the following year. ESPN re-hired Glanville on March 28, 2019.

=== Non-baseball career ===
After leaving baseball, Glanville served as managing partner for Metropolitan Development.

Glanville is President of GK Alliance, LLC, a Glen Ellyn, Illinois-based company providing intellectual capital for start-up and emerging companies. In his role with GK Alliance, he serves as Director, New Business Initiative for both James Romes Consulting and MechTechnologies, and President of Glanville-Koshul Homes.

Since January 2008, Glanville has been writing for The New York Times. On May 9, 2009, Glanville wrote an op-ed article in The New York Times regarding his choice to not use steroids during his baseball days. The article compared the decision to Neo's choosing between blue and red pills in the movie The Matrix. Glanville wrote that thoughts of his mother kept him from abusing PEDs. In an online blog article of January 21, 2010, Glanville responded to Mark McGwire's admission that he used steroids.

Glanville's book The Game From Where I Stand (ISBN 0805091599) was published by Times Books in May 2010. Buzz Bissinger called it "a book of uncommon grace and elegance...filled with insight and a certain kind of poetry." In April 2014, Glanville wrote an article in The Atlantic on a racial-profiling experience.

Glanville is an avid massively multiplayer online game player along with former teammate Curt Schilling. He currently teaches at the University of Connecticut's Neag School of Education.

== See also ==
- List of Major League Baseball career stolen bases leaders
