= Eduardo Pérez =

American baseball player (born 1969)

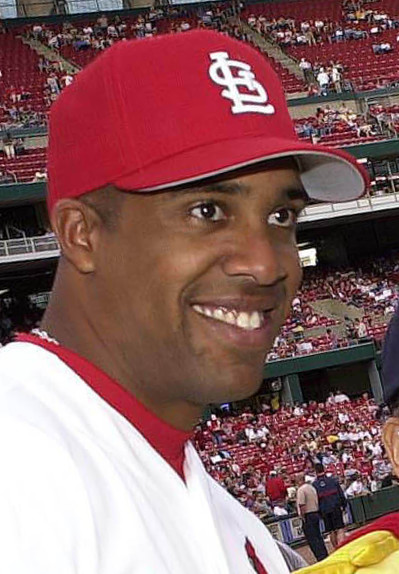
- Pérez in 2002
- First baseman / Outfielder / Third baseman
- Born: September 11, 1969 (age 56); Cincinnati, Ohio, U.S.
- Batted: Right Threw: Right

Professional debut
- MLB: July 27, 1993, for the California Angels
- NPB: March 30, 2001, for the Hanshin Tigers

Last appearance
- NPB: June 15, 2001, for the Hanshin Tigers
- MLB: October 1, 2006, for the Seattle Mariners

MLB statistics
- Batting average: .247
- Home runs: 79
- Runs batted in: 294

NPB statistics
- Batting average: .222
- Home runs: 3
- Runs batted in: 19
- Stats at Baseball Reference

Teams
- California Angels (1993–1995); Cincinnati Reds (1996–1998); St. Louis Cardinals (1999–2000); Hanshin Tigers (2001); St. Louis Cardinals (2002–2003); Tampa Bay Devil Rays (2004–2005); Cleveland Indians (2006); Seattle Mariners (2006)

Eduardo Atanasio Pérez Pérez (born September 11, 1969) is an American former professional baseball player, coach, and current television sports color commentator. He played in Major League Baseball and the Nippon Professional Baseball league as a first baseman, third baseman, and outfielder from 1993 to 2006. After his playing career, Pérez became a baseball analyst with ESPN, ESPN Deportes, and ESPN Latin America as well as a host on SiriusXM's MLB Network Radio.

== Early career ==
Eduardo Pérez was born in Cincinnati, the son of baseball Hall of Famer Tony Pérez and Pituka Pérez. His godfather is Hall of Famer Orlando Cepeda. Pérez's older brother, Victor, graduated from Xavier University and played one year in the Cincinnati Reds minor league system.

Pérez graduated from Robinson School, a private, college-prep high school in San Juan, Puerto Rico. He went to Florida State University and majored in political science. He played college baseball under head coach Mike Martin for the Florida State Seminoles. In 1989, he played collegiate summer baseball with the Brewster Whitecaps of the Cape Cod Baseball League. As a junior in 1991, Pérez was named second Team All-American by the American Baseball Coaches Association and third Team All-American by Baseball America, batting .370 with 11 home runs, 58 RBIs, and 30 stolen bases. That year, the Seminoles were also in the College World Series, and Pérez was a first-round draft pick (17th overall) of the California Angels.

Pérez played professionally in 1991 for the Angels' Class A short-season Boise Hawks of the Northwest League. The following year, he played for the Class A Palm Springs Angels of the California League before being promoted to the Double-A Midland Angels of the Texas League. In 1993 he played most of the year with the Triple-A Vancouver Canadians of the Pacific Coast League, and in July he was called up to the parent club.

== Major league career ==
Pérez played his first major league game on July 27, 1993, as the Angels defeated the Oakland A's 15–8 in Anaheim. Starting at third base and batting sixth, he had three at-bats, two hits, a walk, three runs batted in and three runs scored. His first plate appearance resulted in a first-inning walk against Bobby Witt.

Pérez recalled his first at-bat during a 2019 ESPN baseball broadcast. Pérez had swung at a slider that was over a foot and a half off the plate to honor a childhood pact with his brother that if either of them made it to the major leagues they agreed to swing at the first pitch.

An inning later he got his first career hit, a double off reliever Joe Boever. In the eighth inning, Pérez hit his first home run, a 3-run shot off Kevin Campbell, scoring teammates Tim Salmon and Chili Davis.

He also hit the first of his three career walk-off home runs in 1993. The Angels trailed the Minnesota Twins 3–2 in the bottom of the ninth inning with Salmon on base and one out. Pérez homered to left field off Twins reliever Rick Aguilera for a 4-3 Angels win.

Pérez's most productive year came in 1997 for the Cincinnati Reds. In 330 plate appearances, he hit .253 with 16 home runs, 52 runs batted in, 18 doubles, 29 walks and five stolen bases. In 2003 for the St. Louis Cardinals, in 289 plate appearances, he hit .285 with 11 home runs, 41 runs batted in, 16 doubles, 29 walks and five stolen bases.

One pitcher that Pérez had success against was Hall of Famer Randy Johnson. On April 19, 2005, starting at first base for Tampa Bay against the New York Yankees in Yankee Stadium, Pérez hit two home runs (in consecutive at-bats) and knocked in three runs against Johnson. Through that game. Pérez was 8-for-27 lifetime against Johnson, with four home runs, seven runs batted in and two doubles. In 2006, Pérez's last season, Johnson was ejected and suspended five games for a brushback pitch against Pérez a half-inning after Johnson's teammate, Jorge Posada, had been hit by a pitch.

Pérez's four home runs against Johnson were the most against one pitcher in Pérez's career. He hit three each off Al Leiter and Sterling Hitchcock.

Pérez also was known for some big pinch-hit home runs during his career, including three in one season (2002) for the Cardinals and seven for his career. His game-winning pinch-hit home runs included an 11th-inning shot for the Reds off Los Angeles Dodgers pitcher Mark Guthrie in 1997, an eighth-inning two-run shot for the Cardinals off New York Mets pitcher Al Leiter in 2002, and a ninth-inning walk-off solo shot for the Devil Rays against pitcher Alan Embree.

Pérez's final career hit came September 23, 2006 as the Mariners fell to the host Chicago White Sox, 11–7. He hit a fifth-inning single off Mark Buehrle, driving in Raúl Ibañez. His final career at-bat was September 29. At age 37, playing for the Seattle Mariners in a 6–5 loss to the Texas Rangers, he pinch hit for Ben Broussard and struck out against C. J. Wilson.

== Post-playing career ==
Pérez joined ESPN's Baseball Tonight 2006 postseason coverage along with then-current player Vernon Wells and former players Tino Martinez and Eric Byrnes. Pérez worked as an analyst for Baseball Tonight through 2011 and also served as an analyst for ESPN Deportes' "Béisbol Esta Noche." In 2007, he provided commentary for the NCAA baseball regionals, the Triple-A All-Star Game, and the Little League World Series regionals. He speaks both English and Spanish fluently.

In late 2007, three months after the Puerto Rican winter baseball league was cancelled after 69 seasons, Pérez returned to Puerto Rico and announced his founding of the Winter Training Program (WTP) for both professional and amateur players in an effort to return pro baseball back to the island. The program was sponsored by the government municipality of San Juan, Major League Baseball, and private donors.

In 2008 and 2009, Pérez was manager of Leones de Ponce in Puerto Rico. He was named the 2008 Manager of the Year in the Puerto Rico Baseball League after leading the team to the league title.

While serving as a special assistant to the baseball operations department of the Cleveland Indians, on June 8, 2011, Pérez was named hitting coach of the Miami Marlins, replacing John Mallee as manager Ozzie Guillén and most of his staff were let go shortly after the 2012 season. Pérez managed the team representing Colombia in the World Baseball Classic Qualifying Round in 2013, finishing with a 1–2 record.

Pérez served as the Houston Astros bench coach under manager Bo Porter during the 2013 season. For 2014, he was named the Astros first base coach, but he resigned that position in early January 2014 to spend more time with family.

On February 11, 2014, ESPN announced that Pérez had rejoined the network as a studio and game analyst.

During the winter of 2014–2015, Pérez served as the manager of the Santurce Crabbers in the Puerto Rican Winter League. The Crabbers won the league championship and participated in the Caribbean World Series.

In 2016, Pérez joined SiriusXM's MLB Network Radio hosting The Leadoff Spot with Steve Phillips.

In 2020, while MLB was shut down due to the COVID-19 pandemic, Pérez worked on ESPN's coverage of baseball from the Korea Baseball Organization, working with Karl Ravech.

On September 29, 2020, Pérez alongside Karl Ravech and Tim Kurkjian called Game 1 of the American League Wild Card Series between the Houston Astros and Minnesota Twins. It was the first time that ABC broadcast an MLB game since Game 5 of the 1995 World Series.

On December 9, 2025, it was announced that Perez would be taking over from Buck Martinez as the president of the Baseball Assistance Team.

== Personal life ==
Pérez was married December 2000. They have two daughters, born in 2003 and 2006. The family has resided in San Juan, Puerto Rico and Miami, Florida.

Pérez's father is Hall of Famer Tony Pérez.

== See also ==
- List of second-generation Major League Baseball players
- List of Cuban Americans

Sporting positions
Preceded by John Mallee	Florida Marlins hitting coach 2011–2012	Succeeded by Tino Martinez
Preceded by Joe Pettini	Houston Astros bench coach 2013	Succeeded by Adam Everett
