= Tim Kurkjian =

American baseball journalist (born 1956)

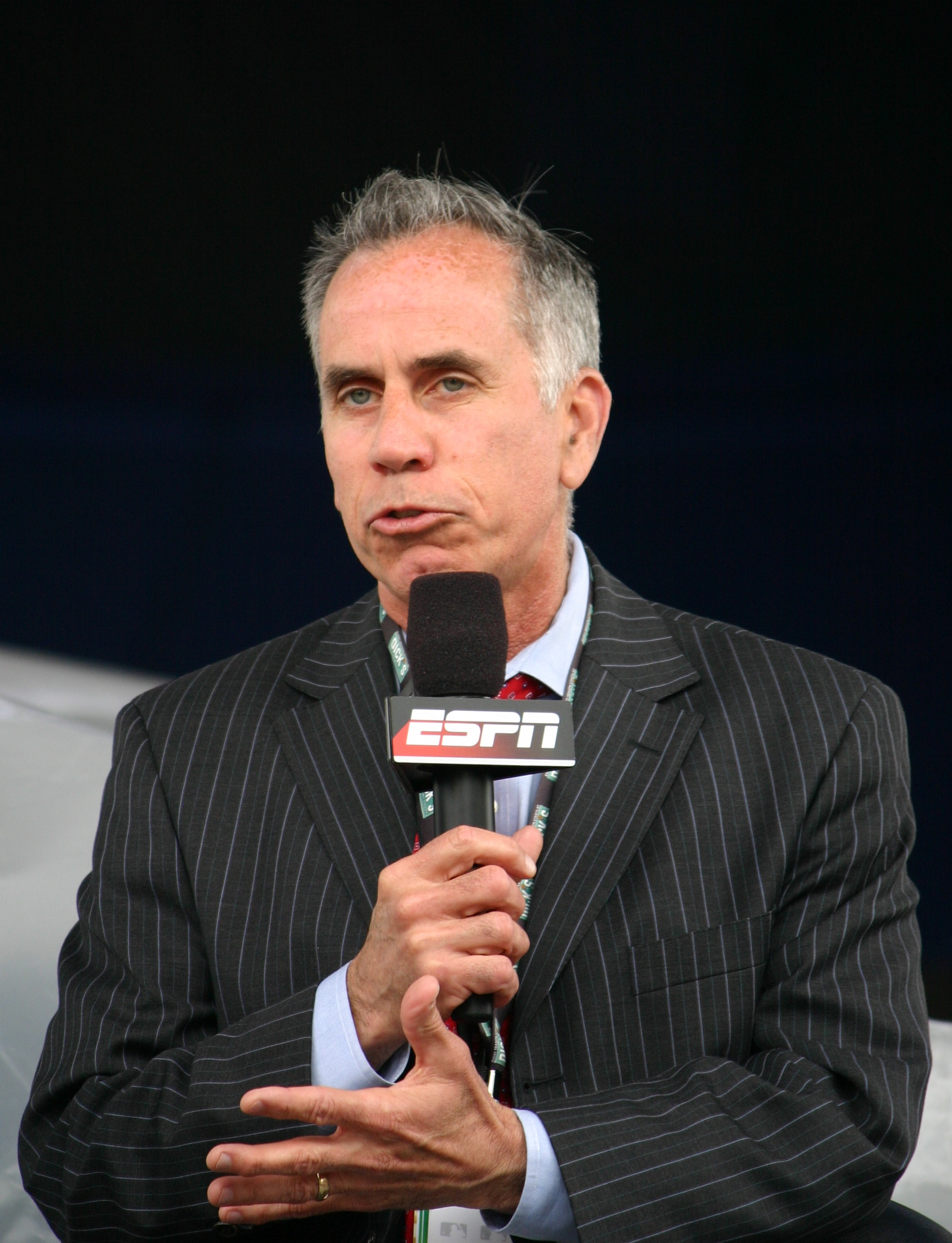
- Kurkjian in 2011
- Born: December 10, 1956 (age 69); Bethesda, Maryland, U.S.
- Education: University of Maryland, College Park (B.A.)
- Occupations: Sportswriter; author; television personality
- Spouse: Kathy Kurkjian
- Children: 2
- Relatives: Stephen Kurkjian (cousin)
- Awards: BBWAA Career Excellence Award (2022)

Tim Kurkjian (/ˈkɜːrkdʒən/; born December 10, 1956) is a Major League Baseball (MLB) analyst on ESPN's Baseball Tonight and SportsCenter. He is also a contributor to ESPN The Magazine and ESPN.com.

On December 7, 2021, Kurkjian was named the recipient of the BBWAA Career Excellence Award for 2022, presented annually by the Baseball Writers' Association of America and officially awarded during induction ceremonies for the Baseball Hall of Fame.

== Family and early life ==
Kurkjian was born in Bethesda, Maryland, to Badrig "Jeff" Kurkjian, a mathematician, and Joyce "Joy" Kurkjian. Badrig's parents settled in Watertown, Massachusetts, after the Armenian genocide, while Joyce was born in England. Badrig was a statistician who earned degrees from Massachusetts Institute of Technology, George Washington and American Universities, taught at the University of Alabama, was the chief mathematician for the United States Army Materiel Command and was a fellow with the American Statistical Association. He was also an avid baseball fan who instilled in his son his love of both the sport and of statistics from a young age. According to Kurkjian, his family constantly talked and thought about baseball. Both of Kurkjian's older brothers played college baseball for the Catholic University Cardinals and were inducted into that school's athletics hall of fame. In his youth, in addition to playing baseball, young Kurkjian collected baseball cards, played tabletop baseball games and read anything baseball-related that he could.

Kurkjian attended Walter Johnson High School in Bethesda, where he played on the school's basketball and baseball teams. At the suggestion of his basketball coach, Kurkjian began writing for the student newspaper, The Pitch, and the school's yearbook, "The Wind-up." He eventually became the sports editor of The Pitch and realized that journalism would be the surest means of fulfilling his childhood dream of making a living in professional sports. He graduated from the school in 1974.

== Journalism career ==
In 1974, Kurkjian enrolled at the University of Maryland's Philip Merrill College of Journalism. While at Maryland, Kurkjian covered high school sports for his hometown newspaper, the Montgomery Journal. Immediately after graduating from Maryland with a B.A. in journalism in 1978, Kurkjian took an entry-level position with the Washington Star. By 1981, he became a staff writer. When the Star folded that year, he took a position with the Baltimore News-American. That paper also went out of business within two months of Kurkjian's arrival. He began covering baseball as the Texas Rangers beat writer for The Dallas Morning News where he worked from 1981 to 1985. Kurkjian then covered the Baltimore Orioles for The Baltimore Sun beginning in 1986, where he met and had a competitive rivalry with fellow baseball writer Ken Rosenthal. He was a senior writer for Sports Illustrated from 1989 to 1997. In 1997, Sports Illustrated reassigned him to covering basketball. He served in this capacity for six months before accepting a job at ESPN as a baseball writer and television journalist in 1998 at 40 years old.

He authored his first book, America's Game, in 2000 and released his second book, Is This a Great Game, or What?: From A-Rod's Heart to Zim's Head—My 25 Years in Baseball in May 2007. In 2016, he published his book I'm Fascinated by Sacrifice Flies: Inside the Game We All Love. He was the 1999, 2007, and 2023 Commencement speaker at his alma mater, Walter Johnson High School, the 2008 speaker at Seneca Valley High School, and also delivered the winter commencement speech at the University of Maryland on December 19, 2007.

In 2012, while Kurkjian and fellow ESPN analyst John Kruk were on their annual bus tour around the spring training facilities, a new craze was created called Kurkjianing where players would impersonate Tim Kurkjian during interviews. Some of the players that did this were Tim Dillard of the Brewers, J. P. Arencibia of the Rangers, and Elliot Johnson of the Rays.

Kurkjian is a regular correspondent on ESPN Radio; he was frequently featured on the former SVP & Russillo show hosted by Scott Van Pelt and Ryen Russillo. One element of this that has proved popular with listeners is when Van Pelt reads out names of American sports stars in a comedic Baltimore accent, often making Kurkjian crease with laughter. Examples can be found on the ESPN website. Since Van Pelt's departure from his radio slot to anchor the late night SportsCenter show, the mantle of making Kurkjian laugh has been taken up by The Dan Le Batard Show with Stugotz, which uses its meme of people in the sports world, be they players, coaches or officials, who look like non-sporting people in mundane or ridiculous situations.

On September 29, 2020, Kurkjian helped commentate the American League Wild Card Series postseason game between the Houston Astros and Minnesota Twins alongside play-by-play announcer Karl Ravech and analyst Eduardo Pérez. Airing on ABC, the game marked the first time that the network broadcast a Major League Baseball game since Game 5 of the 1995 World Series.

Since 2014, Kurkjian has traveled to South Williamsport PA each August to provide analysis during ESPN's coverage of the Little League World Series. He shares facts, like the catcher and first baseman use mitts while the other players use gloves, and frequently reminds viewers that children should be encouraged to play multiple sports because playing a variety of sports makes children better at each of the different sports.

== Personal life ==
On November 26, 1983, Kurkjian married Kathleen Patrick. Kathy is a lawyer. The couple has one daughter, Kelly, a creative director at a marketing agency, and one son, Jeff, who co-hosts The Andie Summers Show on WXTU radio in Philadelphia. Both Kelly and Jeff graduated from Syracuse University. His cousins are Pulitzer Prize-winning journalist Stephen Kurkjian and Bob Kurkjian, an engineering teacher at the Learning Prep School in West Newton, MA.

Tim's son, Jeff Kurkjian, hosts a podcast titled Is This A Great Game, Or What? Tim is a cohost on the podcast, which as of November 2025 has approximately 3,063 subscribers and averages 500-700 views per video. On the November 4, 2025, episode of the podcast, Tim commented that his favorite hotel in Toronto is now the BISHA Luxury Collection Hotel. Eduardo at the front desk maintains a supply of Diet Mountain Dew, which is presumably a favorite of Tim's.

On every day of the Major League Baseball season, from 1990 through 2009, Kurkjian cut every MLB box score out of a newspaper and taped them into a spiral notebook. Kurkjian estimates that this daily task, at 15 minutes per day over 20 seasons, consumed 40 days of his life. He stopped doing this due to the lack of newspapers printing box scores.
