= Baseball Tonight =

U.S. television program

- Genre: Pre-game, halftime and post-game show
- Presented by: Various commentators
- Country of origin: United States
- Original language: English
- No. of seasons: 37 (through 2026 season)

Production
- Production locations: Various MLB stadiums (game telecasts); ESPN Headquarters, Bristol, Connecticut (2020)
- Camera setup: Multi-camera
- Running time: 60 minutes
- Production companies: Major League Baseball; ESPN

Original release
- Network: ESPN
- Release: March 19, 1990 – present
- Network: ABC
- Release: September 29, 2020 – present
- Network: ESPN2
- Release: May 29, 2022 – August 17, 2025

Related
- ESPN Major League Baseball; Major League Baseball on ABC; Monday Night Baseball; Sunday Night Baseball; Wednesday Night Baseball; Major League Baseball on ESPN Radio

Baseball Tonight is an American television program that airs on ESPN and ABC. The show, which covers the day's Major League Baseball action, has been on the air since 1990. Its namesake program also airs on ESPN Radio at various times of the day during the baseball season, with Marc Kestecher as host.

Baseball Tonight is also the title of a daily podcast hosted by Buster Olney with frequent appearances by Tim Kurkjian, Karl Ravech and others from ESPN and more places.

In 2017, daily airing of the show, other than its Sunday airing, was replaced by MLB Network's Intentional Talk, which stopped airing on ESPN2 in December 2018 From 2019 to 2025, Baseball Tonight aired on Sundays before Sunday Night Baseball, and during the week for major events such as the MLB All-Star Game, College World Series, MLB Postseason, MLB Trade Deadline and Winter Meetings, along with SportsCenter segments during the season.

With the loss of Sunday Night Baseball after the 2025 season, Beginning in 2026, Baseball Tonight will now air in various time slots throughout the week prior to any game on ESPN and ABC.

== History ==
On January 3, 2000, the segment "Web Gems" was coined and created by then-producer Judson Burch. The segment originally featured great defensive plays followed by viewer internet voting on the "web." The phrase "web gem" is now common vernacular in baseball broadcasts and circles to describe outstanding glove work.

In 2007, a new segment entitled "That's Nasty!" was introduced. The new segment featured top pitching performances of the day, including the best individual pitches. These clips often include extremely high velocity fastballs, 12–6 curveballs, or changeups that completely fool the opposing batters.

In 2013, Adnan Virk replaced Steve Berthiaume as one of the program's hosts, joining Karl Ravech.

Starting in April 2017 the weekday and Saturday editions of Baseball Tonight were replaced by airings of MLB Network's Intentional Talk. In December 2018, four months before the deal to air Intentional Talk was to end in April 2019, the show stopped airing on ESPN2, with airings on MLB Network being unaffected. For the 2019 season, despite rumors of a return of the show daily, ESPN, just as they did the past two years, continued to only air Baseball Tonight sporadically throughout the season on Monday-Saturday, along with the weekly Sunday version Baseball Tonight: Sunday Night Countdown before Sunday Night Baseball.

Also, a segment on SportsCenter known as the Baseball Tonight Report started, which aired all throughout the Major League Baseball season. During the Playoffs, Baseball Tonight goes back to its traditional daily airings on ESPN2.

On February 3, 2019, Adnan Virk was fired from ESPN for leaking confidential information, including the future of Baseball Tonight, to the media, including Awful Announcing.

During the final three weeks of the 2024 Major League Baseball season, ESPN or ESPN2 will air Baseball Tonight Special: MLB Squeeze Play on Wednesday nights. The studio show features whip-around coverage focused on the pennant chase. The show will mark the first since 2016 that ESPN has aired regular weekday editions of Baseball Tonight outside the MLB playoffs.

=== Air times ===
Baseball Tonight appeared nightly on ESPN throughout the baseball season at 10:00 p.m. ET and 12:00 a.m. ET on ESPN2. The 10 PM show aired on ESPN2 in the event of a conflict. Following the cancellation of The Trifecta in late 2006, the 12:00 a.m. run of Baseball Tonight was expanded to a full 40 minutes. The show has permission from Major League Baseball to show in-progress highlights. The show was also seen at 12:30 p.m. ET and 7:00 p.m. ET on Sundays, the latter show leading up to the Sunday Night Baseball telecast.

The late-night edition on Sundays was usually just a re-air of the 7:00 show, with a SportsCenter anchor providing highlights of the Sunday night game in place of a game preview segment that airs during the live broadcast. The midnight edition usually re-aired at 12:00 p.m. ET the following day (excluding Saturday, when the show is usually 40 minutes to a full hour). That practice ended Monday August 11, 2008, when SportsCenter went to live editions in the mornings.

=== Live, on-location episodes ===
The show also appeared live at events throughout the year, such as spring training, the Major League Baseball All-Star Game and the World Series sites, at ESPN the Weekend, and occasionally had remote stunts, i.e. a show from the rooftop at Fenway Park and a show from one of the Wrigley Rooftops at Wrigley Field in 2005.

It aired live from the field at Fenway Park on April 26, 2009, before the Sunday Night Baseball game between the Yankees–Red Sox game, which featured an interview with Dustin Pedroia. On June 28, 2009, it aired from Citi Field in anticipation of that night's Subway Series game between the Mets and the Yankees.

During the 2019 season, Baseball Tonight went on-location for the defending World Series champions Boston Red Sox Home Opener, along with going to London, England for the New York Yankees vs the Boston Red Sox.

== Featured segments ==
Baseball Tonight is split into a number of segments, each of which focuses on a particular aspect of baseball. These segments include:

- 3 up, 3 down: 3 players/teams each that are either on the uprise or downside of their seasons or careers (in the case of players).
- Analysis: a more in-depth look at baseball topics, players, and upcoming games.
- Best Seat in the House: Airs during live editions of Baseball Tonight before Sunday Night Baseball, John Kruk takes a tour on a ballpark and seeks for what he thinks is the best seat in the ballpark.
- Chatter Up: This segment is new for the 2007 season, in which fans get to submit their thoughts on certain subjects via ESPN.com and then they are shown at the bottom of the screen and discussed on the show.
- Cutting The Wedge: an in-depth analysis of a play or situation by former manager and studio analyst Eric Wedge
- Diamond Cuts: Airs on the Sunday edition, a montage of the week's best plays set to music.
- Extra Bases: a more in-depth look at a particular game after the highlights have aired.
- Going, Going, Gone: the day's longest home runs. (Usually one of the last segments of the day.)
- Highlights: the most important happenings from the days' Major League Baseball, occasionally also featuring other baseball competitions such as the World Baseball Classic, the College World Series, Minor League Baseball, or the Little League World Series. Virtually every MLB game is shown at least once, more if there are in-progress highlights to report on.
- Inside Pitch: This segment usually features Buster Olney, or another reporter, giving his insight on the latest news and rumors from around baseball.
- Leading Off: usually the first segment of the show, giving the day's most significant baseball news, for example, trades, injury updates and hirings and firings of managers.
- The Week with Tim "Quirkjian": Tim Kurkjian gives unusual stats from the world of baseball. The segment is a play on the analyst's name.
- Most Important Thing: Analysts' comments on the most important story from the day's happenings in MLB. This is usually the final segment of the show.
- On The Phone: a live phone interview with an MLB player, coach, or general manager, usually regarding the most recent game played and outlooks on the future of the team.
- Out of the Box: This segment is similar to Leading Off, where they preview what is coming up on the show.
- Ridiculous Plays of the Week: Usually aired on Fridays, it recaps the five most hilarious plays (and moments) from the past week.
- Stat of the Night: an interesting baseball statistic from the day's happenings in MLB.
- That's Nasty: New in 2007, a segment showing the best pitches, usually with the most movement, of the night.
- Touch 'Em All: significant home runs of the day, replaced "Going, Going, Gone!"
- Smash of the Night: The most significant home run of the day. Usually the longest or biggest scorer like a "Grand Slam".
- Sport Science: Hosted by John Brenkus, this five-minute segment examines a key play through scientific analysis.
- Web Gems: the day's five best defensive plays. On Sundays, the best defensive plays of the entire week air. Points are given to each player and at the end of the season the player with the most points wins a trophy.
- Greatest Home Runs: begun as a temporary segment in honor of Barry Bonds' ascension to the all-time MLB home run champion. Featured the greatest five home runs in the history of a different franchise every day for the duration of the segment; on August 26 (the final day of the segment), the Top 10 Home Runs of All-Time were featured.

One featured running gag on the show is the spoof segment "Name That Molina", where one of the personalities has to guess which of the three Molina catcher brothers – Bengie, Jose, or Yadier – is being shown. "Name that LaRoche" is another spoof segment featuring the two brothers who play for the Toronto Blue Jays Andy and the Washington Nationals Adam.

Another running gag is the Umpire Fantasy League in which "owners" of umpires in this fictitious league are rewarded for their umpires ejecting players or coaches. It is unclear whether this is reference to the real-life Umpire Ejection Fantasy League.

Also another gag in session is when an analyst on the show uses the "Stump the host" slogan. This is when the analyst has information on a certain players milestone that has just happened on the telecast. An example is when a player hits a home run, double, steals a base, or strikes someone out and the analyst will say "Stump the Host; Career hr/strikeout/2-B/SB/etc. number __? The host very seldom knows the answer but will take a reasonable, and sometimes ludicrous, guess at what the answer might be. This gag is very seldom used but sometimes is quite comical for the fact that the host has no idea what the answer may be.

== Live look-ins ==
ESPN is generally prohibited by Major League Baseball from showing live look-ins of in-progress games, and limited to showing in-progress highlights after they happen. However, an exception is made when there is an extraordinary event taking place, such as a no-hitter or perfect game, and ESPN is allowed to show live look-ins during Baseball Tonight. Other circumstances include an ESPN-scheduled game which suffers a rain delay, or is completely rained out and postponed.

== Criticism ==
Some have criticized the program because of a perceived bias in favor of certain teams. The most vocal comment was expressed by Heath Bell:

I truly believe ESPN only cares about promoting the Red Sox and Yankees and Mets – and nobody else. That's why I like the MLB Network, because they promote everybody. I'm really turned off by ESPN and 'Baseball Tonight.' When (then-Padre) Jake Peavy threw 8 1/3 innings on Saturday, they showed one pitch in the third inning and that was it. It's all about the Red Sox, Yankees, and Mets.

== Media ==
A video game titled ESPN Baseball Tonight was released for 16-bit systems and DOS PCs in 1994. The game featured MLB license, but not MLBPA license.

In late 2012, mobile game company SkyZone Entertainment and TheAppsGames released ESPN Going Going Gone, an arcade style home run derby game for both Android and iOS. The game features an intro and voice over by ESPN's Dan Shulman and ESPN trademark.

== See also ==
- MLB Tonight
- MLB Whiparound
- ESPN Major League Baseball
- Sunday Night Baseball
- Monday Night Baseball
- Wednesday Night Baseball
- Major League Baseball on ESPN Radio
- ESPN Major League Baseball broadcasters
- Major League Baseball on ESPN Radio broadcasters
