= Roxy Bernstein =

American sportscaster

- Born: Allen Samuel Bernstein; September 25, 1972 (age 53); San Francisco, California, U.S.
- Education: University of California, Berkeley
- Sports commentary career
- Genre: Play-by-play
- Sport(s): Major League Baseball; College football College basketball National Hockey League
- Employer: ESPN

Allen Samuel "Roxy" Bernstein (born September 25, 1972) is an American sportscaster for ESPN

== Early life and career ==
Bernstein was born in San Francisco and grew up on the Peninsula in the Bay Area.

After graduating from Pinewood School in Los Altos, California, Bernstein went on to the University of California, Berkeley and graduated with a degree in American Studies. While at Cal, Bernstein broadcast football, men's and women's basketball, and baseball and served as sports director of the student radio station, KALX (FM). Bernstein was hired by Cal at age 23 as the voice of Cal basketball after serving as the backup broadcaster and pregame and postgame host the previous season.

== Broadcasting stops ==
As of 2012, Bernstein is a play-by-play broadcaster of college basketball, NHL and football for ESPN, the Pac-12 Network, and the Oakland Athletics, and is the former broadcast voice for the California Golden Bears men's basketball team on the IMG Sports/Cal Basketball Radio Network. Bernstein had held the Cal position since 1997 and also did national college football play-by-play on the Touchdown Radio Network with 1992 Heisman Trophy winner and College Football Hall of Fame member Gino Torretta. He has been a part-time broadcaster for the Oakland Athletics since 2014; a talk show host for KGMZ 95.7 FM The Game in San Francisco, formerly hosted noon to 3pm on Xtra Sports 860/Sports Byline (KTRB) in San Francisco with J.J. Stokes and Geoff Sheen; and host of The Randy Bennett Radio Show, a weekly broadcast featuring St. Mary's College of California men's basketball coach Randy Bennett. In the winter of 2008–2009, Bernstein was one of two finalists to become the next San Diego Padres television play-by-play announcer, but did not get the job. In August 2009, Bernstein was emcee of the opening ceremonies for the San Francisco Maccabi Games; Bernstein played in the games as a youth, 21 years earlier.

Bernstein spent three years as a broadcaster with the Florida Marlins (2005–2007), teaming with 2011 Ford C. Frick Award Winner Dave Van Horne, but left the Marlins to return to the Bay Area full-time. Prior to his stint with the Marlins, Bernstein called games for the San Francisco Giants and Montreal Expos in Major League Baseball. He also worked for numerous minor league baseball clubs, including the Sonoma County Crushers, Solano Steelheads, High Desert Mavericks, and Tacoma Rainiers. Bernstein has shown his versatility by providing play-by-play for the San Jose Sharks, California Golden Bears football, San Francisco Demons, Oakland Athletics, ESPN Radio, NHL Radio, Westwood One, and the NFL on Sports USA Radio Network, as well as numerous events on television for Fox Sports Net and Comcast Sports Net.

Bernstein announced for the final game of the Pac-12 Network. Bernstein announced more than 300 games with Bill Walton prior to Walton's death from cancer in 2024.
