= Dan Shulman =

Canadian sportscaster (born 1967)

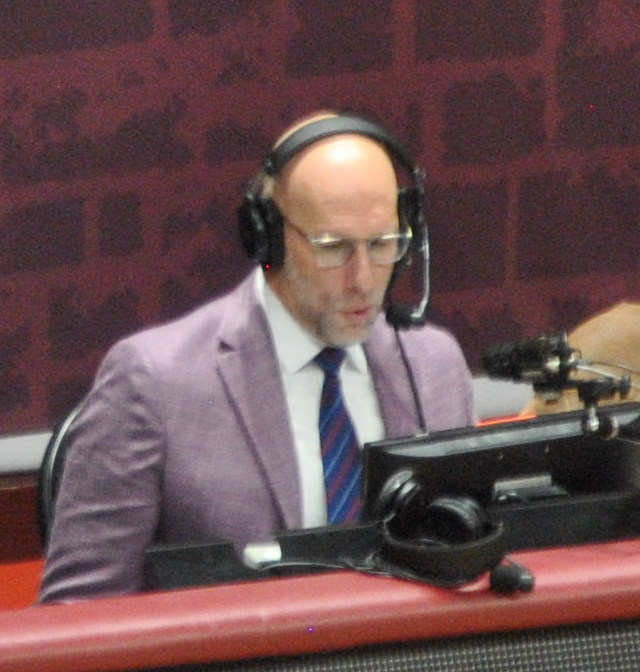
- Shulman in 2022

Toronto Blue Jays
- Broadcaster
- Born: Daniel Shulman; February 9, 1967 (age 59); Toronto, Ontario, Canada

Teams
- As Broadcaster: Toronto Blue Jays (1995–2001, 2016–present); ESPN (2007–present)

Daniel Shulman (born February 9, 1967) is a Canadian sportscaster with Sportsnet as well as the American network ESPN.

Shulman serves as the play-by-play announcer for the Toronto Blue Jays telecasts on Sportsnet. During 2018 and 2020, he hosted the baseball-themed podcast, Swing and a Belt with Dan Shulman. He also serves as the lead announcer for ESPN's men's college basketball coverage (teaming with Jay Bilas), and previously called regular-season and postseason Major League Baseball on ESPN and ESPN Radio.

Previously, Shulman served as the play-by-play announcer for ESPN's Sunday Night Baseball (with Aaron Boone and Jessica Mendoza), a position he resigned from at the conclusion of the 2017 season.

== Education ==
Born in Toronto, Ontario, Shulman graduated from the University of Western Ontario in actuarial science but moved into a career in sports broadcasting. He graduated from York Mills Collegiate, a high school in Toronto.

== Broadcasting career ==
=== Early career ===
Shulman began his broadcasting career at the University of Western Ontario, becoming a main voice of university football and basketball for the Western Mustangs on CHRW radio in London, Ontario, and later at radio station CKBB in Barrie, where he volunteered for the local community television station. During the early 1990s, he was hired by the Fan 1430 (a sports radio station in Toronto now known as Sportsnet 590 The Fan) and would go on to host Prime Time Sports. He worked for CTV in its coverage of the 1994 Winter Olympics from Lillehammer, Norway, covering hockey, and the 1994 World Championships of Basketball.

=== TSN ===
In 1995, he became the play-by-play voice on TSN for their broadcasts of Toronto Blue Jays baseball games alongside former Blue Jays catcher Buck Martinez. Shulman remained with the network for seven years, during which time he also worked as the network's secondary play-by-play voice for NHL hockey and secondary announcer for NBA basketball. He also covered CHL hockey games and backed up host Dave Hodge on TSN Inside Sports. Until 2007, Shulman continued to work with Buck Martinez for TSN during the World Series, filing daily reports. In 2011, he returned to TSN as an analyst and contributor.

=== ESPN ===
Shulman began working part-time for ESPN while still employed by TSN. In 2001, he moved to ESPN full-time to cover sporting events like baseball and college basketball. ESPN signed Shulman to a five-year contract extension in 2007 and assigned him to call NBA games for the network. Shulman remains the network's lead announcer for NCAA basketball.

On July 27, 2007, Shulman called Barry Bonds's 754th home run for ESPN.

From 2002 to 2007, he served as the lead play-by-play announcer for ESPN Radio's MLB coverage, teaming with Dave Campbell to call the network's Sunday Night Baseball broadcasts as well as the All-Star Game, Home Run Derby, and select postseason games. In 2008, Gary Thorne succeeded Shulman as the lead Sunday Night Baseball voice; however, Shulman once again teamed with Campbell to call that year's All-Star and postseason events and continued to fill in on occasional regular season broadcasts. Shulman also teamed with Orel Hershiser to call Monday Night Baseball for ESPN television from 2008 to 2010 and with Hubie Brown to call ESPN NBA coverage from 2007 to 2012.

On December 1, 2010, ESPN announced that Shulman, Hershiser, and Bobby Valentine would be on the network's new Sunday Night Baseball crew for the 2011 MLB season. During the Sunday Night Baseball telecast between the New York Mets and Philadelphia Phillies on May 1, 2011, Shulman announced live to the ESPN audience that Osama bin Laden had died, a moment that has been compared to Howard Cosell's report of John Lennon's assassination on Monday Night Football in 1980. Shulman told USA Today that he had learned of bin Laden's death from Valentine, who himself received the news via text. "I talked to the producer in the truck and asked if they knew what was going on. Or maybe they asked me," said Shulman. "I couldn't just say something on-air because of a text, I needed corroboration. It all happened in about 30 seconds."

Shulman also teamed with Orel Hershiser and Bobby Valentine for the ESPN Radio broadcast of the 2011 World Series won in 7 games by the St. Louis Cardinals over the Texas Rangers.

That same year, he teamed with Dick Vitale for the broadcast of the Indiana–Kentucky rivalry on December 10, 2011. His call for the game-winning three-pointer by Christian Watford was "Jones... Watford for the win… YES! YES!" with Vitale screaming "Unbelievable!" shortly after.

Shulman was named 2011 National Sportscaster of the Year by the National Sportscasters and Sportswriters Association, the first Canadian-born announcer to be so honoured.

One year later, ESPN hired Terry Francona to join Shulman and Hershiser for the 2012 MLB season in exchange for Bobby Valentine, who has hired to be the Boston Red Sox manager. Francona stayed with ESPN for only one season before he was hired by the Cleveland Indians to be their manager for the 2013 season. On December 3, 2012, ESPN announced that John Kruk, who had been part of the Baseball Tonight team since 2004, would replace Francona join Shulman and Hershiser on the network's new Sunday Night Baseball crew for the 2013 MLB season. At the start of the 2014 season, Hershiser left ESPN to become an analyst for the Dodgers on SportsNet LA and was replaced by Curt Schilling; however, Schilling's subsequent diagnosis of and treatment for an undisclosed form of cancer led to his being unavailable to ESPN for most of the season. Shulman and Kruk worked as a two-man booth until Schilling joined them in September.

On July 3, 2017, Shulman announced in a Sports Illustrated interview that he would step down from Sunday Night Baseball at the conclusion of the 2017 season, seeking to adjust his role at ESPN so he could spend more time with his family in Toronto. He continued to participate in ESPN Radio's coverage of the MLB postseason, as well as ESPN's college basketball coverage.

In October 2022, it was announced that Shulman would step down as ESPN's lead radio broadcaster for the MLB postseason beginning in the 2023 season (with Jon Sciambi taking over for him), focusing solely on his college basketball role with the network.

=== Sportsnet ===
In addition to his continued work with ESPN, on November 19, 2015, Shulman announced he would be joining the Sportsnet broadcast team for upwards of 30 Toronto Blue Jays games during the 2016 and 2017 seasons. In March 2018 it was announced that he would be joining the Sportsnet Radio network for select Blue Jays games, in addition to calling up to 50 games on Sportsnet television.

In April 2018, Shulman teamed up with Sportsnet to air the podcast Swing and a Belt with Dan Shulman where every week, he covers a different topic related to baseball and interviews different people such as Mike Trout and Aaron Boone.

In 2020, Shulman begins to expand his role as the Blue Jays play-by-play voice for most games.

He won the Canadian Screen Award for Best Sports Play-by-Play at the in 2022 and 2025.

Shulman also provides play-by-play commentary for Canada Basketball on Sportsnet and continued in this role during the CBC coverage of the 2024 Summer Olympics, on leave from his regular Blue Jays duties.

== Personal life ==
Shulman is Jewish and has participated in the Maccabiah Games. Shulman had three sons with his wife, Sarah; the couple has since divorced. His third son, Ben, is also a sportscaster and the radio play-by-play announcer for the Blue Jays and the Marlies, along with being an announcer for The Price Is Right Tonight. He had a fourth son in 2019 with his current wife, Lauren. Shulman is an ice hockey fan and cheers for the Toronto Maple Leafs.

Sporting positions
Preceded by Jon Miller	World Series national radio play-by-play announcer 2011–2022	Succeeded by Jon Sciambi
Preceded by Jon Miller	Sunday Night Baseball play-by-play announcer 2011–2017	Succeeded by Matt Vasgersian
