= Marly Rivera =

Puerto Rican journalist

- Born: November 14, 1973 (age 53); San Juan, Puerto Rico
- Occupation: Sportswriter

Marly Rivera (born November 14, 1973) is a sportswriter and reporter who formerly worked for ESPN and ESPN Deportes, and was also a contributor to ESPN Radio and ESPN Deportes Radio.

In April 2023, Rivera was fired from the network for getting into an argument with another reporter, Ivón Gaete, calling her a "fucking cunt" at Yankee Stadium following a confrontation. Gaete, a freelance reporter, is the wife of MLB vice president of communications John Blundell.

== Career ==
Rivera was a general assignment sportswriter and reporter at ESPN Deportes Digital before being named a New York Yankees beat writer. She is the second woman of color to have covered the Yankees as a beat, following in the footsteps of her mentor, Claire Smith.

Prior to working at ESPN, Rivera was an editorial producer and writer at Major League Baseball Advanced Media and a reporter and editor at Univision Communications. She was the only Latina national baseball writer and commentator for ESPN and ESPN Deportes and the only woman to have been a color commentator for ESPN Deportes Radio for MLB's All Star Game, postseason, and World Series broadcasts.

Rivera has been a guest contributor on Béisbol Esta Noche and Sunday Night Baseball in Spanish and English, in addition to Outside the Lines. She is also a frequent contributor to ESPN's flagship program, SportsCenter, and was a guest panelist on the July 21–22, 2016 edition of ESPN First Take. Rivera was the host of the Max y Marly podcast alongside SportsCenter anchor Max Bretos. She was also the lead reporter on the ESPN initiative known as “Béisbol Experience”, the most extensive cross-platform project ever done by the network on Latino MLB players living in the United States.

Rivera hosted the debate show Nación ESPN on ESPN2 alongside NBA Analyst and ESPN Los Angeles Radio host Jorge Sedano.

On October 13, 2017, Rivera was named one of “The 30 Most Influential Hispanics in Sports” by Sports Illustrated.

== Departure from ESPN ==
On April 18, 2023, ahead of a game between the New York Yankees and the Los Angeles Angels at Yankee Stadium, Rivera was involved in a highly publicized verbal altercation with reporter Ivon Gaete. While Gaete was attempting to interview Yankees outfielder Aaron Judge during an open-access pre-game autograph session by the batting cages, Rivera ordered her to leave, claiming she had a pre-scheduled exclusive interview window with Judge. When Gaete stood her ground, noting the public nature of the media area, Rivera directed a profane insult at her in Spanish. The exchange was captured on video by Gaete's camera operator.

Subsequent reviews of the incident and stadium media protocols confirmed that Rivera did not possess an exclusive interview window and had fabricated the claim to gatekeep the space. Following an internal review of the footage and the manufactured nature of the dispute, ESPN terminated Rivera's employment on April 26, 2023.

== Personal life ==
Rivera is bilingual. She was born and raised in San Juan, Puerto Rico, but moved to the United States as a teenager. Her parents, Ray and Elba, are from the small town of Coamo.

Rivera has done philanthropic work to support her island of Puerto Rico after the impact of Hurricane Maria on September 20, 2017.
