= John Kruk =

American baseball player (born 1961)

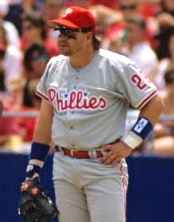
- Kruk playing in 1992
- First baseman / Outfielder
- Born: February 9, 1961 (age 65); Charleston, West Virginia, U.S.
- Batted: Left Threw: Left

MLB debut
- April 7, 1986, for the San Diego Padres

Last MLB appearance
- July 30, 1995, for the Chicago White Sox

MLB statistics
- Batting average: .300
- Home runs: 100
- Runs batted in: 592
- Stats at Baseball Reference

Teams
- San Diego Padres (1986–1989); Philadelphia Phillies (1989–1994); Chicago White Sox (1995)

Career highlights and awards
- 3× All-Star (1991–1993); Philadelphia Phillies Wall of Fame

John Martin Kruk (born February 9, 1961) is an American former professional baseball first baseman and outfielder. Kruk played in Major League Baseball (MLB) for the San Diego Padres, Philadelphia Phillies, and Chicago White Sox from 1986 through 1995. During his career, he was a three-time MLB All-Star. After retiring as a player, Kruk became a baseball analyst for ESPN. He is now a color commentator for Phillies' games on NBC Sports Philadelphia.

== Early life and education ==
Kruk was raised in Keyser, West Virginia. He is of Polish descent and has three siblings. He played baseball at Keyser High School, at Potomac State College, and at Allegany Community College, where Kruk played for Junior College Hall of Fame Coach Steve Bazarnic. Kruk was the first Major Leaguer to come out of Allegany and has been followed by four others (Stan Belinda, Steve Kline, Joe Beimel, and Scott Seabol).

== Career ==
=== San Diego Padres ===
Kruk was signed as the third overall selection in the Special Draft selection on June 13, 1981. He began his professional career with the San Diego Padres after being drafted in 1981. He played in such outposts as Walla Walla, Reno, Beaumont, and Las Vegas, before making his debut with the Padres in 1986. In this same year he played for the Águilas de Mexicali of the Mexican Pacific League for the 1986–87 season. Kruk helped Mexicali win both the League championship and Caribbean Series title.

Kruk's breakout year was 1987 with the Padres. He hit .313 with 20 home runs and 91 RBI, and stole 18 bases, showing surprising speed for someone of his build, although he was caught ten times. He was featured as a backup on the National League All-Star Team in the Nintendo game R.B.I. Baseball. On April 13, 1987, Marvell Wynne, Tony Gwynn, and Kruk became the first players in major league history to open their half of the 1st inning with three consecutive solo home runs in a 13–6 loss to the San Francisco Giants.

In October 1987, Kruk rented a house in San Diego with two other men: Roy Plummer, a high school friend, and Vernon (Jay) Hafer, an acquaintance of Plummer's. They socialized and partied together, with Plummer almost always picking up the check. Unbeknownst to Kruk, who moved out in November to play winter ball in Mexico, Plummer was funding the group's lifestyle by moonlighting as an armed robber, with Hafer serving as his getaway driver. The FBI informed Kruk of his roommates' criminal activities during spring training in February 1988, approaching him before batting practice with a photo of Plummer taken during a bank robbery. According to the FBI, Plummer believed that Kruk had turned him in to the police, and Kruk lived in fear of reprisal until Plummer was apprehended on September 19, 1988. Kruk has stated that the ongoing stress from the episode negatively affected his on-field performance that season.

=== Philadelphia Phillies ===
On June 2, 1989, the Padres dealt Kruk, along with Randy Ready, to the Philadelphia Phillies for Chris James.

After the trade, Kruk blossomed into an All-Star as the team used him primarily at first base. Kruk played in the All-Star Game in 1991, 1992, and 1993. In his 1993 appearance at the Midsummer Classic, he had a memorable at bat when he flailed wildly at 98 mile per hour fastball from Seattle Mariners pitcher Randy Johnson. Johnson's first pitch flew over Kruk's head to the backstop, leading Kruk to feign heart palpitations and remark, "That boy throws too hard, and he's too wild. He could kill someone."

Kruk, who batted .316/.430/.475 in 1993, was also a member of the Phillies' "Macho Row" which led the team to the World Series against the Toronto Blue Jays. In the losing effort, Kruk batted .348/.500/.391 in the Series.

During spring training in 1994, Kruk was diagnosed with testicular cancer (ultimately resulting in the removal of one testicle) after an errant pickoff throw from teammate Mitch Williams hit him in the groin and broke his protective cup. Additionally, weight gain and the astroturf at Veterans Stadium exacerbated his knee problems. After the 1994 season, Kruk was granted free agency.

=== Chicago White Sox ===
Moving to the American League to serve as a designated hitter, Kruk signed with the Chicago White Sox on May 12, 1995, batting .308/.399/.390 in his only season with the ballclub. In the first inning of the White Sox's 8–3 loss to the Baltimore Orioles at Camden Yards on July 30, he singled off Scott Erickson, advanced to and was stranded on third base, removed himself from the game and promptly retired as an active player due to chronic knee soreness. He had made the decision two days earlier and informed his teammates on the eve of his retirement. The parting statement he issued to the media simply read, "The desire to compete at this level is gone. When that happens, it's time to go." Kruk finished his 10-year career with a .300 batting average, 100 home runs and 592 runs batted in.

== Post-baseball activities ==
A quotable character throughout his career who had written a book called I Ain't an Athlete, Lady published in 1994, Kruk turned to broadcasting and commenting on the game. He has since worked for Major League Baseball on Fox, The Best Damn Sports Show Period, and local telecasts in Philadelphia. Kruk has been a resident of Mount Laurel Township, New Jersey.

Kruk coached for a year within the Phillies organization. He coached the Reading Phillies of the Class AA Eastern League during the 2001 season.

Kruk had acting roles in film and television, including the 1996 film The Fan, The Sandlot: Heading Home, and American Pastime. In a 2008 episode of Adult Swim's adult cartoon Aqua Teen Hunger Force, Sirens, Kruk guest starred, voicing the role of himself. Kruk also appeared in the Sawyer Brown music video "Round Here".

In 2004, ESPN hired Kruk as an analyst on Baseball Tonight. He also wrote a column called Chewing the Fat on ESPN.com.

Kruk coached the National League team in the Taco Bell All-Star Legends & Celebrity Softball Game in Anaheim, California, on July 12, 2010.

Kruk appeared in MLB on ESPN commercials, playing himself as part of moments in baseball history; for example, an old briefcase belonging to Kruk buried in the infield dirt containing a rotten sandwich caused the bugs to attack Karl Ravech dressed up as Yankees pitcher Joba Chamberlain, mocking game 2 of the 2007 ALDS between the Yankees and the Indians. He, along with Steve Phillips and Gary Thorne, was a commentator on the video games MLB 2K10, MLB 2K11, MLB 2K12 and MLB 2K13.

In 2012, ESPN hired Kruk to be the color commentator for Sunday Night Baseball alongside Dan Shulman. Also in 2012, fellow West Virginians, the Davisson Brothers Band, were approached by Kruk to write a new theme song for Baseball Tonight. In 2015, once again, Kruk, asked the Davisson Brothers Band to record a special track, titled "Right Here on ESPN", for the ESPN bumpers during the July 4 weekend.

Following the 2016 baseball season in October, Kruk and ESPN mutually agreed to part ways. In February 2017, Comcast SportsNet announced that they hired Kruk to join the Philadelphia Phillies broadcast team, replacing Matt Stairs, who was hired as the Phillies' hitting coach.

After moving to Naples, Florida six years prior, Kruk took over the Seacrest Country Day School softball team as the head coach in 2016. He was named the Florida Athletic Coaches Association Class 2A Coach of the Year for the district in his first year with the Stingrays.

== Honors and awards ==
- In 2003—the final year of Veterans Stadium—Philadelphia Phillies fans voted Kruk as the first baseman on the Phillies All-Vet Team (1971–2003).
- On August 12, 2011, Kruk was inducted into the Philadelphia Baseball Wall of Fame.
