= Jon Sciambi =

American sportscaster (born 1970)

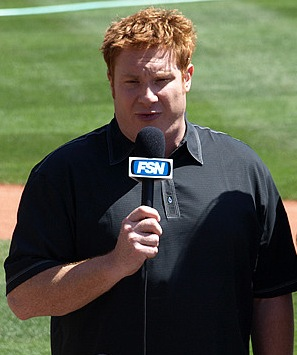
- Sciambi at Champion Stadium in March 2008
- Born: Jonathan David Sciambi; April 11, 1970 (age 56); Philadelphia, Pennsylvania, U.S.
- Education: Boston College
- Occupations: Sports play-by-play announcer and television personality
- Years active: 1993–present
- Employer(s): ABC; ESPN; Marquee Sports Network

Jonathan David Sciambi (/ˈʃɑːmbi/ SHAHM-bee; born April 11, 1970) is an American sportscaster for ABC, ESPN and the Marquee Sports Network and has been the everyday play-by-play announcer for the Chicago Cubs TV broadcasts on Marquee since 2021. He has worked extensively as a baseball play-by-play announcer, calling games for ESPN television and on ESPN Radio. Sciambi's nickname, "Boog," was given to him by Hank Goldberg because of his physical resemblance to former major league player Boog Powell. He also broadcasts college basketball games for ESPN.

== Early life ==
Born in Philadelphia, Sciambi grew up on Roosevelt Island in New York City. He is a graduate of Regis High School in New York City and Boston College.

== Career ==
As Sciambi attended Boston College, he began his sportscasting experience on WZBC, the school's 1000-watt FM radio station broadcasting to the Greater Boston area. Classmates and fellow broadcasters at WZBC included Joe Tessitore and Bob Wischusen, both of whom also went on to become successful sports announcers.

Sciambi was an announcer with the Florida Marlins from 1997 to 2004.

Sciambi was the play-by-play announcer for the Atlanta Braves on SportSouth and FSN South from 2007 to 2009. He was paired with Joe Simpson. Late in the 2009 season, it was announced that Sciambi would be leaving the Braves and joining ESPN's Major League Baseball and college basketball coverage full-time.

Jon announced several games during the 2009 World Baseball Classic.

He formerly worked in South Florida sports radio on 790 The Ticket. Sciambi left the radio show on April 4, 2008, to focus on broadcasting for the Atlanta Braves. Prior to being on 790, Sciambi was a talk show host on WQAM for several years.

On January 4, 2021, Marquee Sports Network named Sciambi as play-by-play announcer for its Chicago Cubs telecasts following the resignation of the former play-by-play announcer, Len Kasper. He also continues to call regular-season and postseason games on ESPN Radio; in October 2022, it was announced that Sciambi will take over as the lead announcer for ESPN Radio's postseason coverage in the 2023 season, replacing Dan Shulman.

Sciambi succeeded Matt Vasgersian and took over the main play-by-play calls for the MLB: The Show video game series starting with MLB The Show 22. He did play-by-play calls for MLB The Show 23 through 26 along with former MLB player Chris Singleton and was joined by Robert Flores in 26.

He will be calling select Minnesota Timberwolves games during the 2026-2027 NBA season. Marking his first year with the team. Sciambi will share play-by-play duties with Kevin Calabro, Michael Grady, and Alan Horton.

== Philanthropy ==
Sciambi has been involved in funding research of and direct care for victims of ALS, also known as Lou Gehrig's Disease. In 2006, Sciambi founded Project Main St. with Tim Sheehy, a friend who later died from the disease.

Sporting positions
Preceded by Len Kasper	Chicago Cubs television play-by-play announcer 2021–present	Succeeded by Incumbent
Preceded by Dan Shulman	World Series national radio play-by-play announcer 2023–present	Succeeded by Incumbent
