= Kevin Brown (sportscaster) =

American journalist and sportscaster

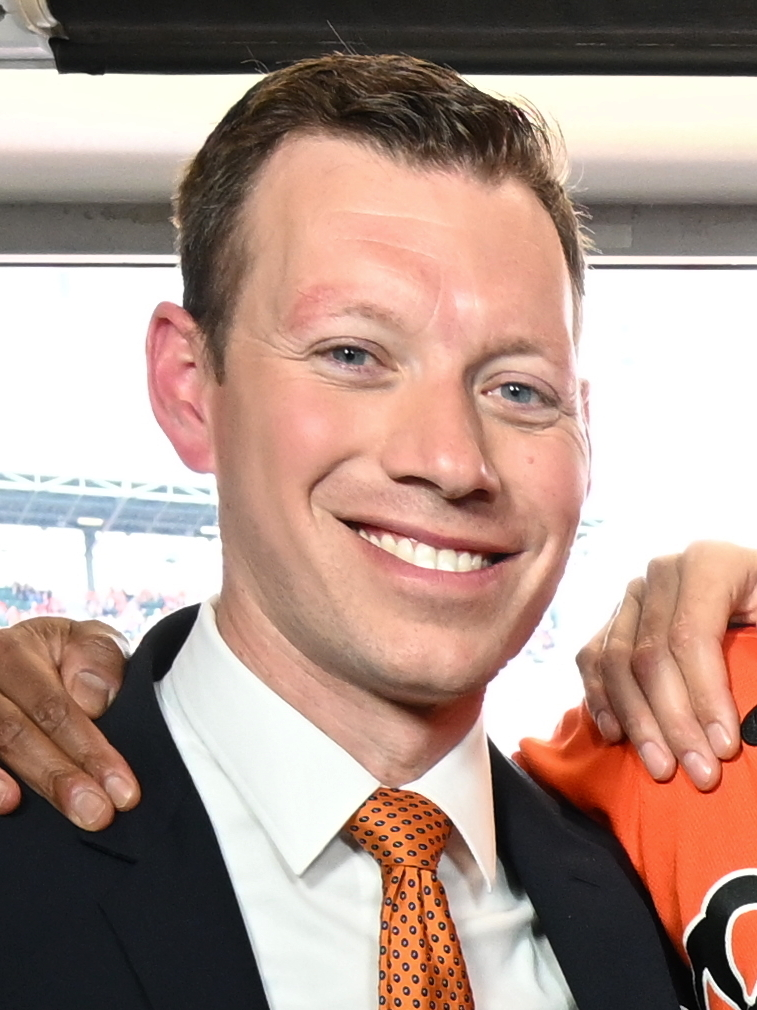
- Brown in 2025
- Occupation: Play-by-play commentator
- Years active: 2010–present
- Known for: Play-by-play commentator for Baltimore Orioles

Kevin Noble Brown is an American journalist and sportscaster for the Baltimore Orioles. He is also a play-by-play commentator for several college sports with ESPN.

== Early life and career ==
Brown graduated from Chaminade High School in 2006. Brown graduated from the Newhouse School at Syracuse University in 2011 with a degree in broadcast journalism. From 2011 to 2017, he was the director of broadcasting and media relations for the Syracuse Chiefs, the Triple-A affiliate of the Washington Nationals. In 2017, he made his debut on the Washington Nationals' Radio Network. He has also announced high school and college football, hockey, and basketball for ESPN since 2016.

== Baltimore Orioles ==
He began his radio role for the Baltimore Orioles in 2019, backing up Jim Hunter for approximately 50 games. He started calling the play-by-play in 2020, and became the primary television play-by-play announcer in 2022.
