= Buster Olney =

American sports columnist

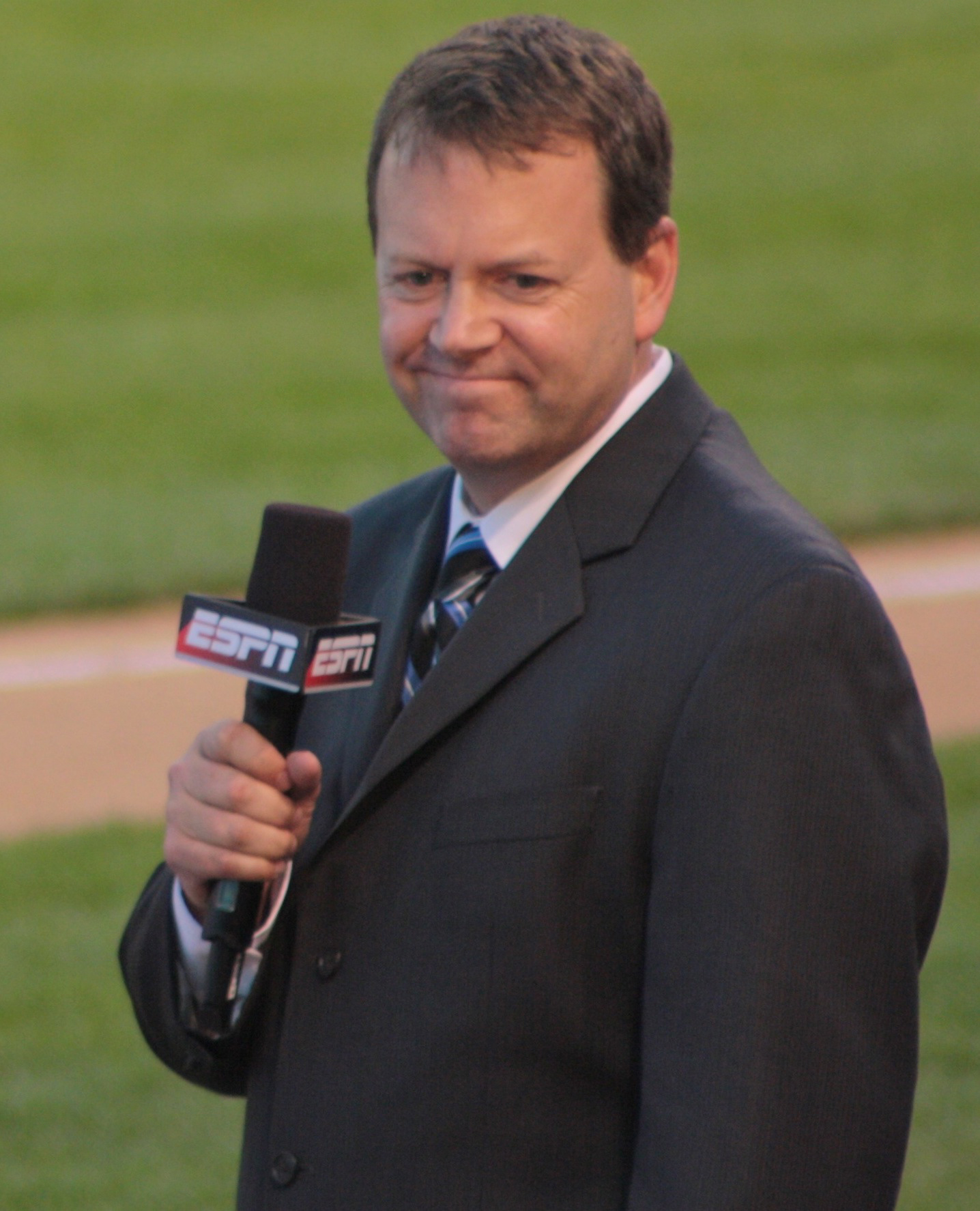
- Olney in 2011
- Born: Robert Stanbury Olney III; 1963 or 1964 (age 62–63); Washington, D.C., U.S.
- Education: Vanderbilt University (BA)
- Occupations: Sportswriter; sportscaster; author
- Years active: 1989–present

Robert Stanbury "Buster" Olney III (born 1963 or 1964) is an American sports journalist for ESPN, ESPN: The Magazine, and ESPN.com. He previously covered the New York Giants and New York Yankees for The New York Times. He is also a regular analyst for the ESPN's television program Baseball Tonight and hosts ESPN's Baseball Tonight daily podcast.

== Early life and education ==
Olney was born in Washington, D.C., and grew up on a dairy farm in Randolph Center, Vermont. He was educated at Northfield Mount Hermon School in Gill, Massachusetts, and Vanderbilt University, where he earned a Bachelor of Arts degree in history. As a child Olney was an avid baseball fan. At age eight, he developed an affinity for the Los Angeles Dodgers after reading a book about Sandy Koufax. Olney would later attribute his fanship as a reason for his journalistic career.

== Journalism career ==
=== Print ===
After graduation, Olney began covering baseball in 1989, as the Nashville Banner's beat reporter assigned to the Triple-A Nashville Sounds. While in Nashville, he formed a close relationship with Don Meyer, head coach of the men's basketball program at Lipscomb University. He later worked at the San Diego Union-Tribune and The Baltimore Sun. He arrived at the New York Times in 1997 and in his first year won an Associated Press award.

During one of his first assignments in Nashville, the Sounds hosted the Columbus Clippers who, at the time, were the AAA affiliate of the New York Yankees. Olney almost had a minor confrontation with a Yankee prospect at the time known more for his football play, Deion Sanders. Olney had attempted to do a piece on Sanders, but was blown off. In return, Olney wrote what he called later in his career an unflattering piece on Sanders. Sanders replied to Olney by writing on a baseball "Keep writing like that your whole life and you'll always be a loser."

=== The Last Night of the Yankees Dynasty ===
In 2004, Olney published The Last Night of the Yankee Dynasty, ISBN 0-06-051506-6, a nonfiction account of the Yankees' run of championships in the 1990s. The book also considered why the team lost to the Arizona Diamondbacks in the 2001 World Series and why it didn't win a championship between 2001 and 2003. Since leaving the Times, Olney has become a constant on the ESPN family of networks.

=== How Lucky You Can Be: The Story of Coach Don Meyer ===
In 2010, Olney wrote How Lucky You Can Be: The Story of Coach Don Meyer, an account of how a car crash and cancer diagnosis affected the life of the highly accomplished college basketball coach. In 2013, Olney delivered the May commencement speech at Northern State University, where Meyer coached until 2010, and was still a member of the faculty until his death on May 18, 2014.

== Personal life ==
Olney resides in Yorktown Heights, New York.
