= Karl Ravech =

American sportscaster (born 1965)

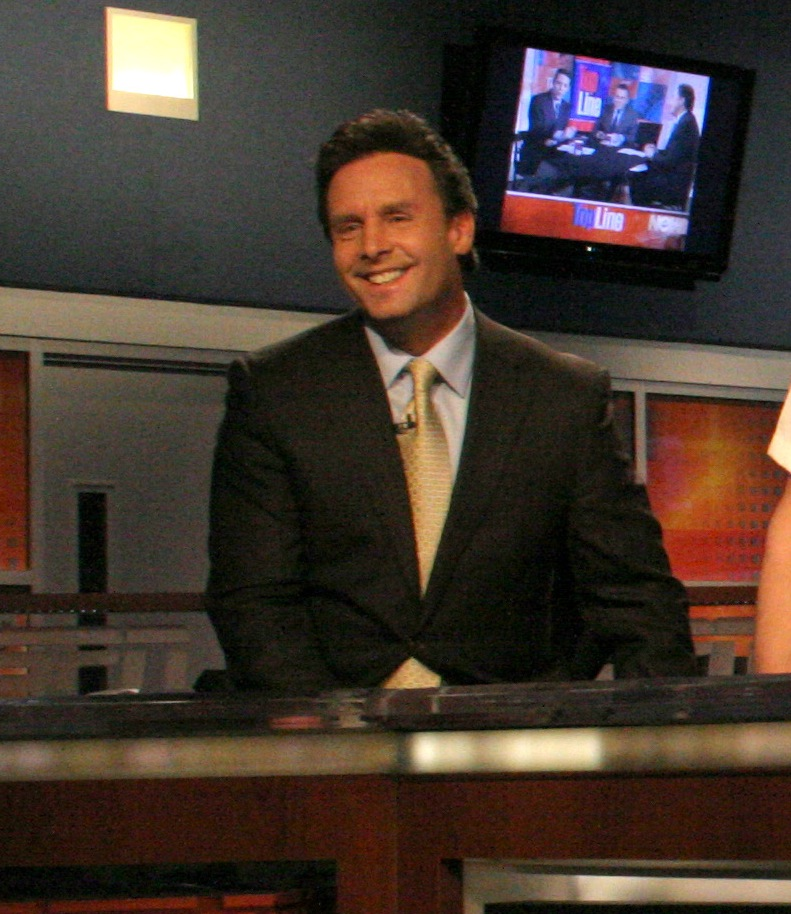
- Ravech in 2011
- Born: Needham, Massachusetts, U.S.
- Education: Ithaca College; Binghamton University
- Occupation: Sportscaster
- Years active: 1987–present
- Employer(s): Capital Cities/ABC (1993–1996) and The Walt Disney Company including ABC and ESPN (1996–2026)

Karl Ravech (/ˈrævɪtʃ/) is an American sportscaster who served as the lead play-by-play announcer for Major League Baseball (MLB) on ESPN and ABC.

Ravech was the lead announcer for Sunday Night Baseball on ESPN from 2022 to 2025.

== Early life and education ==
Ravech was born and raised in Needham, Massachusetts. He is Jewish. Ravech played three sports at Needham High School, from which he graduated in 1983. He received a bachelor's degree in communications from Ithaca College in 1987 and a master's degree in management and leadership from Binghamton University in 1990.

== Career ==
=== Early work ===
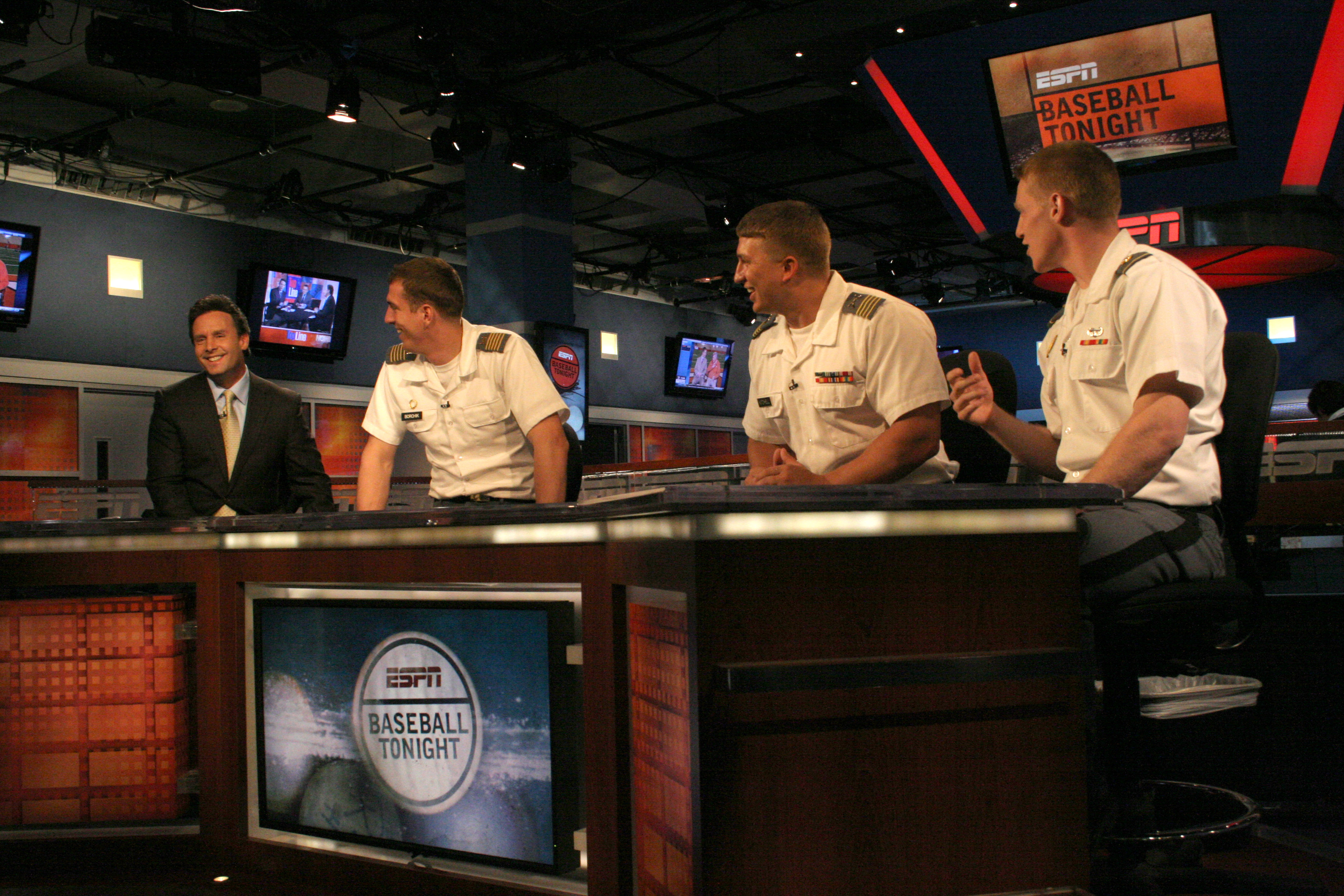
Ravech with West Point cadets on March 31, 2011

Ravech worked at WBNG-TV, in Binghamton, New York, as a sports anchor/reporter from 1987 to 1990, and then WHTM-TV in Harrisburg, Pennsylvania, from 1990–1993 in a similar role.

=== ESPN ===
Ravech worked for ESPN from 1993 to 2026, appearing primarily on SportsCenter and Baseball Tonight. Ravech provided commentary for ESPN and ABC's coverage of the Little League World Series in South Williamsport, Pennsylvania. He has also done commentary for the College World Series, golf, college basketball, and ESPN's KBO League coverage during 2020. He also appears as the Baseball Tonight host in the 2K Sports video game, Major League Baseball 2K5. Ravech was laid off by ESPN on July 21, 2026. However, backlash and controversy led to ESPN's decision to allow Ravech to call for the remaining games. His final play–by–play announcement was on August 30, 2026 which aired on both ESPN and ABC.

== Personal life ==
After he began working for ESPN, Ravech settled with his wife in Avon, Connecticut. Ravech suffered a heart attack in November 1998. Ravech's son Sam, at the age of 22, became the youngest play-by-play broadcaster on ESPN after calling a Tulane men's basketball game on November 22, 2017.

Sporting positions
Preceded by Matt Vasgersian	Sunday Night Baseball play-by-play announcer 2022–2025	Succeeded by Jason Benetti (NBC)
