= History of ESPN on ABC =

History of American sports television channel

Top to bottom: Logos for ESPN and ESPN on ABC

Sports programming on ABC is provided on occasion, primarily on weekend afternoons; since 2006, the ABC Sports division has been merged, with all sports telecasts on ABC being produced in association with sister cable network ESPN under the branding ESPN on ABC. While ABC has, in the past, aired notable sporting events such as the NFL's Monday Night Football, and various college football bowl games (including, most prominently for a period, the Bowl Championship Series), general industry trends and changes in rights have prompted reductions in sports broadcasts on broadcast television (the BCS's successor, the College Football Playoff and national championship, air exclusively on ESPN).

ABC is the broadcast television rightsholder of the National Basketball Association (NBA), with its package (under the NBA on ESPN branding) traditionally beginning with its Christmas Day games, followed by a series of Sunday afternoon games through the remainder of the season, weekend playoff games, and all games of the NBA Finals. ABC is the broadcast television rightsholder of the National Hockey League (NHL), with its package (under the NHL on ESPN branding). In this deal, ABC broadcasts up to ten regular season games (mostly afternoon), the NHL All-Star Game and four Stanley Cup Finals. During college football season, ABC typically carries an afternoon doubleheader on Saturdays, along with the primetime Saturday Night Football. ABC also airs coverage of selected bowl games. The Saturday afternoon lineup outside of football season typically features airings of ESPN Films documentaries or other studio programs under the banner ESPN Sports Saturday, while Sunday afternoons usually feature either brokered programming, or encore and burn-off airings of ABC programs.

== 1950s ==
=== Early beginnings as Sports Programs, Inc. ===
Widely credited as a pioneer in network sports broadcasting, Edgar Scherick created the television program ABC's Wide World of Sports at his company Sports Programs, Inc. which he started in 1956 with $600.00. Scherick had formed this company after leaving CBS when the network would not make him the head of sports programming, choosing instead Bill MacPhail, a former baseball public-relations agent. Before ABC Sports even became a formal division of the network, Scherick and ABC programming chief Tom Moore pulled off multiple programming deals involving the most popular American sporting events.

While Scherick wasn't interested in "For Men Only," he recognized the talent Roone Arledge had. Arledge realized ABC was the organization he was looking to join. The lack of a formal organization would offer him the opportunity to claim real power when the network matured. So, he signed on with Scherick as an assistant producer.

Several months before ABC began broadcasting NCAA college football games, Arledge sent Scherick a remarkable memo, filled with youthful exuberance, and television production concepts which sports broadcasts have adhered to since. Previously, network sporting broadcasts had consisted of simple set-ups and focused on the game itself. The genius of Arledge in this memo was not that he offered another way to broadcast the game to the sports fan. Arledge recognized television had to take the sports fan to the game. In addition, Arledge realized that the broadcasts needed to attract, and hold the attention of women viewers. At age 29 on September 17, 1960, he put his vision into reality with ABC's first NCAA college football broadcast from Birmingham, Alabama, between Alabama Crimson Tide and the Georgia Bulldogs won by Alabama, 21–6. That same year, ABC began broadcasting games of the fledgling American Football League and used the same innovative techniques in their broadcasts. Sports broadcasting has not been the same since.

=== Earliest coverage of the National Football League ===
In 1948 and 1950, ABC televised the NFL Championship Game. Harry Wismer provided commentary for the game in 1948 game and the game in 1955 joined by Red Grange and Joe Hasel. Since the game was played in Los Angeles, there was no network telecast of the 1951 NFL Championship Game because at that time there was no way to send live television programs from the West Coast to the East Coast and vice versa.

ABC first broadcast regular season NFL games in 1953. At the time, they only broadcast Chicago Bears home games and Chicago Cardinals home games. Beginning in 1954, ABC added Washington Redskins home games. In ABC's final year of their initial go around with the National Football League, they added Los Angeles Rams and San Francisco 49ers games (for the Pacific Time Zone affiliates) to go along with their coverage of the Bears and Cardinals. Wire accounts found in newspaperarchive.com indicated that the Washington-Philadelphia game in Week 2 of the 1953 season, was to have been regionally televised by ABC, but the cables needed for the telecast never arrived. The articles said that NFL Commissioner Bert Bell was "fuming" over the incident.

ABC's relationship with the NFL at this point pretty much ended when CBS began carrying regular season games across its network nationwide in 1956. This came off the heels of the NFL's previous principal network television partner, the DuMont Network suspending its operations. Less than five years later however, ABC became the initial network television partner for the American Football League (AFL). The deal called for ABC to broadcast approximately 37 regular season games, the AFL Championship Game and the AFL All-Star Game. These games were typically broadcast regionally on 15 consecutive Sundays and on Thanksgiving Day. This became the first ever cooperative television plan for professional football, in which the proceeds of the contract were divided equally among member clubs; the National Football League would follow suit in 1961, a move that required Congress to pass the Sports Broadcasting Act of 1961 to accommodate such collective broadcasting contracts.

=== Creating the Major League Baseball Game of the Week ===
In 1953, Scherick broached a Saturday Game of the Week, sports television's first network series. At the time, ABC was labeled a "nothing network" that had fewer outlets than CBS or NBC. ABC also needed paid programming or "anything for bills" as Scherick put it. At first, ABC hesitated at the idea of a nationally televised regular season baseball program. ABC wondered how exactly the Game of the Week would reach television in the first place and who would notice if it did? Also, Major League Baseball barred the Game of the Week from airing within 50 miles of any ballpark. Major League Baseball according to Scherick, insisted on protecting local coverage and didn't care about national appeal. ABC, though, did care about the national appeal and claimed that "most of America was still up for grabs."

In April 1953, Edgar Scherick set out to sell teams rights but instead, only got the Philadelphia Athletics, Cleveland Indians, and Chicago White Sox to sign on. These were not "national" broadcast contracts since they were assembled through negotiations with individual teams to telecast games from their home parks. It was until the Sports Broadcasting Act of 1961, that antitrust laws barred "pooled rights" television contracts negotiated with a central league broadcasting authority.

In 1953, ABC earned an 11.4 rating for their Game of the Week telecasts. Blacked-out cities had 32% of households. In the rest of the United States, 3 in 4 television sets in use watched Dizzy Dean and Buddy Blattner (or backup announcers Bill McColgan and Bob Finnegan) call the games for ABC. CBS took over the Saturday Game in 1955 (the rights were actually set up through the Falstaff Brewing Corporation) retaining Dean/Blattner and McColgan/Finnegan as the announcing crews (as well as Gene Kirby, who produced the Dean/Blattner games and alternated with them on play-by-play) and adding Sunday coverage in 1957. As Edgar Scherick said, "In '53, no one wanted us. Now teams begged for "Game"'s cash."

In 1959, ABC broadcast the best-of-three playoff series (to decide the National League pennant) between the Milwaukee Braves and Los Angeles Dodgers. The cigarette company L&M was in charge of all of the telecasts. George Kell and Bob DeLaney were the announcers.

== 1960s ==
=== Becoming ABC Sports and the birth of Wide World of Sports ===
In February 1960, Scherick sold Sports Programs to ABC for $500,000 in ABC stock, where it became ABC Sports, the sports division of the network. With the acquisition, Scherick was appointed head of the ABC Sports division, then Vice President in charge of Network Sales.

Despite the production values he brought to NCAA college football, Scherick wanted low-budget (as in inexpensive broadcasting rights) sports programming that could attract and retain an audience. He hit upon the idea of broadcasting track and field events sponsored by the Amateur Athletic Union. While Americans were not exactly fans of track and field events, Scherick figured Americans understood games.

So in January 1961, Scherick called Arledge into his office, and asked him to attend the annual AAU board of governors meeting. While he was shaking hands, Scherick said, if the mood seemed right, might he cut a deal to broadcast AAU events on ABC? It seemed a tall assignment, but as Scherick said years later, "Roone was a gentile and I was not." Arledge came back with a deal for ABC to broadcast all AAU events for $50,000 a year.

Next, Scherick and Arledge divided up their NCAA college football sponsor list. They then telephoned their sponsors and said, "Advertise on our new sports show coming up in April, or forget about buying commercials on NCAA college football this fall." The two persuaded enough sponsors to advertise, though it took them to the last day of a deadline imposed by ABC programming to do it.

Wide World of Sports suited Scherick's plans exactly. By exploiting the speed of jet transportation and flexibility of videotape, Scherick was able to undercut NBC and CBS's advantages in broadcasting live sporting events. In that era, with communications nowhere near as universal as they are today, ABC was able to safely record events on videotape for later broadcast without worrying about an audience finding out the results.

Arledge, his colleague Chuck Howard, and Jim McKay (who left CBS for this opportunity) made up the show on a week-by-week basis the first year it was broadcast. Arledge had a genius for the dramatic story line that unfolded in the course of a game or event. McKay's honest curiosity and reporter's bluntness gave the show an emotional appeal which attracted viewers who might not otherwise watch a sporting event.

But more importantly from Arledge's perspective, Wide World of Sports allowed him to demonstrate his ability as an administrator as well as producer. Arledge did not gain a formal title as president of ABC Sports until 1968, even though Scherick left his position to assume a position of vice president for programming at ABC in 1964.

During its initial season in the spring and summer of 1961, Wide World of Sports was initially broadcast from 5 p.m. to 7 p.m. Eastern Time on Saturdays. Beginning in 1962, it was pushed to 5 to 6:30 pm, and later to 4:30 to 6 pm. Eastern Time to allow ABC affiliates in the Eastern and Central Time Zones to carry local early-evening newscasts.

=== Broadcasting the American Football League and MLB (again) ===
On June 9, 1960, the league signed a five-year television contract with ABC, which brought in revenues of approximately $2,125,000 per year for the entire league. The deal called for ABC to broadcast approximately 37 regular season games, the AFL Championship Game and the AFL All-Star Game. These games were typically broadcast regionally on 15 consecutive Sundays and on Thanksgiving Day. This became the first ever cooperative television plan for professional football, in which the proceeds of the contract were divided equally among member clubs; the National Football League would follow suit in 1961, a move that required Congress to pass the Sports Broadcasting Act of 1961 to accommodate such collective broadcasting contracts.

ABC would broadcast AFL games from the league's very first season in 1960 until the 1964 season, when NBC took over as the league's primary network television broadcaster.

Also in 1960, ABC returned to baseball broadcasting with a series of late-afternoon Saturday games. Jack Buck and Carl Erskine were the lead announcing crew for this series, which lasted one season. ABC typically did three games a week. Two of the games were always from the Eastern or Central Time Zone. The late games (no doubleheaders) were usually San Francisco Giants or Los Angeles Dodgers' home games. However, the Milwaukee Braves used to start a number of their Saturday home games late in the afternoon. So if the Giants and Dodgers were both the road at the same time, ABC still would be able to show a late game.

In 1965, ABC provided the first-ever nationwide baseball coverage with weekly Saturday broadcasts on a regional basis. ABC paid $5.7 million for the rights to the 28 Saturday/holiday Games of the Week. ABC's deal covered all of the teams except the New York Yankees and Philadelphia Phillies (who had their own television deals) and called for two regionalized games on Saturdays, Independence Day, and Labor Day. Each Saturday, ABC broadcast two 2 p.m. games and one 5 p.m. game for the Pacific Time Zone. ABC blacked out the games in the home cities of the clubs playing those games. Major League Baseball however, had a TV deal with NBC for the All-Star Game and World Series. At the end of the season, ABC declined to exercise its $6.5 million option for 1966, citing poor ratings, especially in New York.

According to ABC announcer Merle Harmon's profile in Curt Smith's book Voices of Summer, in 1965, CBS' Yankee Game of the Week beat ABC in the ratings in at least Dallas and Des Moines. To make matters worse, local television split the big-city audience. Therefore, ABC could show the Cubs vs. the Cardinals in the New York market, yet the Mets would still kill them in terms of viewership. Harmon, Chris Schenkel, Keith Jackson, and (on occasion) Ken Coleman served as ABC's principal play-by-play voices for this series. Also on the network's announcing team were pregame host Howard Cosell and color commentators Leo Durocher, Tommy Henrich, Warren Spahn (who worked with Chris Schenkel on a July 17, Baltimore-Detroit contest), and Hall of Fame Brooklyn Dodger great Jackie Robinson (who, on April 17, 1965, became the first black network broadcaster for Major League Baseball). According to ABC Sports producer Chuck Howard, "(Robinson) had a high, stabbing voice, great presence, and sharp mind. All he lacked was time."

=== Early forays with college basketball ===
ABC first broadcast college basketball games in 1962, when the network aired the NCAA Championship Game on a day-behind delayed basis, as part of its Wide World of Sports anthology series. On December 15, 1973, ABC aired what is considered to be the first telecast of a regular season college basketball game by a major broadcast network (between UCLA and North Carolina State in St. Louis). ABC (which had recently lost the NBA rights to CBS) televised this game using its former NBA announcing crew of Keith Jackson and Bill Russell.

In the 1977–78 season, C.D. Chesley (who controlled the rights to the Atlantic Coast Conference (ACC) at the time) wanted NBC to televise select ACC games as part of its national package as it had done the previous few years. However, NBC wanted to feature intersectional games. This action greatly upset Chesley, who wound up selling the rights to the ACC Tournament final to ABC. ABC would televise the 1978 ACC Tournament final as part of Wide World of Sports. The game, called by Jim Lampley and Bill Russell, marked the first time Duke University's Blue Devils basketball team played on national television.

=== The debut of the Pro Bowlers Tour ===
Prior to the debut of the PBA on ABC television in 1962, most tournaments were organized where, once the cut was established after qualifying rounds, a set number of match-play games were bowled, and bonus pins were given to the winner of each match. The champion was then decided based on the final overall total pinfall.

From 1962 to 1965, ABC started televising the PBA Tour, starting with a limited number of tournaments on ABC's Wide World of Sports, and later having its own timeslot. Therefore, a round-robin tournament format was implemented to determine the champion. The televised finals would be cut to the top four bowlers after match-play, and then three round-robin matches between the fourth, third and second-seeded bowlers would determine the final two bowlers. If any bowler were to win both of his matches in the round-robin, he would go on to face the tournament leader. If the three bowlers each split their matches to go 1 and 1 in the round-robin, total pinfall would decide which man would advance to the final match to face the tournament leader. The winner of the final match would win the tournament.

The first-ever telecast was actually taped and aired at a later date. The original commentators were Chris Schenkel and bowling star Billy Welu. On May 16, 1974, Welu died suddenly of a heart attack.

The search for his replacement included bowling legends Dick Weber and Dave Davis, but it was the young Nelson Burton Jr. who was ultimately selected for the analyst job in 1975. He remained Schenkel's broadcasting partner until the end of the series.

=== ABC's original coverage of the NBA ===
Meanwhile, ABC first signed a deal with the National Basketball Association (NBA) to become the league's primary television partner in 1964; the network's first game telecast aired on January 3, 1965 (a game between the Boston Celtics and Cincinnati Royals). ABC's initial alliance with the NBA first came about due to ABC Sports head Roone Arledge's search for live programming that could diminish the ratings of CBS Sports Spectacular, and ABC's own analogy program, Wide World of Sports a boost with sponsors. ABC initially paid the NBA only $650,000 for the rights annually.

For much of the 1960s, ABC only televised Sunday afternoon games, including during the NBA Playoffs. This meant that ABC did not have to televise a potential NBA Finals deciding game if it were played on a weeknight. In 1969, ABC did televise Game 7 of the Los Angeles Lakers–Boston Celtics series in prime time on a weeknight. The following season, ABC aired the 1970 NBA Finals in its entirety, making it the first Finals series to have all games televised nationally.

By 1969, ABC's NBA contract worth only $3 million. To put things into proper perspective, in 1969, Major League Baseball's television contract with NBC was worth $16.5 million while the National Football League cost CBS about $22 million. What that meant is that ABC had made a bargain in purchasing the television rights to the NBA, considering the league's steady ratings. ABC's ratings for the NBA rose from a 6.0 in 1965 to an 8.2 in 1968.

ABC lost the broadcast rights to the NBA to CBS after the 1972–73 season, with the network's initial tenure with the league ending with its last NBA Finals game on May 10, 1973. ABC filled the void left by losing the NBA by counterprogramming Wide World of Sports on Sundays against CBS' NBA coverage.

=== The premiere of The American Sportsman ===
The show has its roots in a 20-minute segment depicting Curt Gowdy and Joe Brooks fly fishing in the Andes Mountains in Argentina in 1964. The segment appeared on Wide World of Sports and immediately was spun off into its own series airing at 3 PM EST on Sundays January through March on ABC. The show's first episode was on January 31, 1965, and ran through 1986. ABC would present filmed highlights involving the program's hosts and celebrities participating in hunting and/or fishing trips along with outdoor recreational activities such as whitewater kayaking, hang gliding and free climbing.

=== Winning the NCAA football contract ===
ABC won the NCAA contract from the 1966 season onwards. This was essentially the television plan that stayed in place until the University of Oklahoma and the University of Georgia filed a lawsuit against the NCAA in 1981, alleging antitrust violations. The lawsuit, NCAA v. Board of Regents of the University of Oklahoma, made it all the way to the Supreme Court, who in 1984 ruled in favor of Oklahoma and Georgia and declared the NCAA's forced collective contract a violation of antitrust law. ABC then negotiated with the College Football Association for its game package.

ABC announced the entire 1966 television schedule in June with 8 national games and 24 regional games for a total of 15 broadcast windows. In 1966, the NCAA allowed each school to appear on ABC for at most one national telecast and one regional telecast. On November 19, 1966, ABC showed a regional doubleheader. The main early game was Notre Dame-Michigan State (ranked 1 and 2). This was the famous 10–10 tie. ABC was unable to televise this game live nationally due to the above restriction. However, ABC got approval from the NCAA to show this game on tape delay in the late timeslot in the regions of the country which got Kentucky-Tennessee in the early timeslot.

On September 23, 1967, Chris Schenkel and Bud Wilkinson were scheduled to announce the Penn State-Navy game. However, there was an NABET strike of engineers and technicians which AFTRA was supporting and this duo (members of AFTRA) refused to work the game. So ABC Sports producer Chuck Howard did play-by-play on this game. Howard lined up Jim Tarman (Penn State's SID) and Bud Thalman (Navy's SID) to provide color commentary.

=== The beginning of ABC's two decade relationship with the Olympics ===
While CBS aired both the 1960 Winter and Summer Games (marking the first time that the Olympics were broadcast on American television), by 1964, a different network showed the Winter Games: ABC. Roone Arledge won broadcast rights for his network and began a relationship with the "five rings" that would last over two decades. The program used many of the same production staff from ABC's Wide World of Sports, as well as the same host, Jim McKay, who moved to ABC from CBS in 1961. In 1968, ABC showed both the Winter Games and the Summer Games.

The 1964 Winter Games were in Innsbruck, Austria, and coverage was taped and flown by plane back to the United States. All of it was in black-and-white, but with most Winter Olympic events in the morning (local time), most television coverage aired the day the events were held. A portion of the Closing Ceremony was televised live via satellite (Telstar, which had to be tracked and allowed about a 15-minute window between the United States and Europe when it was zooming over the Atlantic). Everything else was videotaped and flown to the United States via a Munich-London-New York route. There was little margin for error. If a flight was canceled, ABC had a tape of a United States-Romania hockey game, played the day before the Opening Ceremony and shipped over, ready to play. All went well and it never made the air.

ABC aired 16.5 hours of coverage of the Innsbruck Games, the majority of the coverage occurring outside of primetime.

By 1968, ABC was broadcasting the Olympics in full color, and satellites made possible live coverage of several events at the Winter Games in Grenoble, France and of nearly all of the network's coverage of the Summer Games in Mexico City. In reality, only the Opening Ceremony and the ladies figure skating final were televised live via satellite; most other coverage was sent via satellite to ABC and run off tape from New York. The 1968 Winter Olympics were the first to be televised in color (except for a couple of events the French fed in black-and-white).

Highlighting the 1968 Winter Games was a dramatic sweep in men's alpine skiing by Frenchman Jean-Claude Killy, while the major highlight of the Summer Games was a world-record long jump by Bob Beamon of the United States, which happened to air live in the United States.

== 1970s ==
=== The birth of Monday Night Football ===
During the early 1960s, NFL Commissioner Pete Rozelle envisioned the possibility of playing at least one game weekly during prime time that could be viewed by a greater television audience (while the NFL had scheduled Saturday night games on the DuMont Television Network in 1953 and 1954, poor ratings and the dissolution of DuMont led to those games being eliminated by the time CBS took over the rights in 1956). An early bid by the league in 1964 to play on Friday nights was soundly defeated, with critics charging that such telecasts would damage the attendance at high school football games. Undaunted, Rozelle decided to experiment with the concept of playing on Monday night, scheduling the Green Bay Packers and Detroit Lions for a game on September 28, 1964. While the game was not televised, it drew a sellout crowd of 59,203 spectators to Tiger Stadium, the largest crowd ever to watch a professional football game in Detroit up to that point.

Two years later, Rozelle would build on this success as the NFL began a four-year experiment of playing on Monday night, scheduling one game in prime time on CBS during the 1966 and 1967 seasons, and two contests during each of the next two years. NBC followed suit in 1968 and 1969 with games involving American Football League teams.

During subsequent negotiations on a new television contract that would begin in 1970 (coinciding with a merger between the NFL and AFL), Rozelle concentrated on signing a weekly Monday night deal with one of the three major networks. After sensing reluctance from both NBC and CBS in disturbing their regular programming schedules, Rozelle spoke with ABC.

Despite the network's status at the time as the lowest-rated of the three major broadcast networks, ABC was also reluctant to enter the risky venture. It was only after Rozelle used the threat of signing a deal with the independent Hughes Sports Network, an entity bankrolled by reclusive businessman Howard Hughes, did ABC sign a contract for the scheduled games. Speculation was that had Rozelle signed with Hughes, many ABC affiliates would have pre-empted the network's Monday lineup in favor of the games, severely damaging potential ratings.

After the final contract for Monday Night Football was signed, ABC Sports producer Roone Arledge immediately saw possibilities for the new program. Setting out to create an entertainment "spectacle" as much as a simple sports broadcast, Arledge hired Chet Forte, who would serve as director of the program for over 22 years. Arledge also ordered twice the usual number of cameras to cover the game, expanded the regular two-man broadcasting booth to three, and used extensive graphic design within the show as well as instant replay.

Looking for a lightning rod to garner attention, Arledge hired controversial New York City sportscaster Howard Cosell as a commentator, along with veteran football play-by-play announcer Keith Jackson. Arledge had tried to draw in Curt Gowdy and then Vin Scully to ABC for the MNF play-by-play role, but settled for Jackson after they proved unable to break their respective existing contracts with NBC Sports and the Los Angeles Dodgers. Jack Buck was also considered, but when Arledge assistant Chuck Howard telephoned Buck with the job offer, Buck refused to respond due to anger at his treatment by ABC during an earlier stint with the network. Arledge's original choice for the third member of the trio, Frank Gifford, was unavailable since he was still under contract to CBS Sports. However, Gifford suggested former Dallas Cowboys quarterback Don Meredith, setting the stage for years of fireworks between the often-pompous Cosell and the laid-back Meredith.

Monday Night Football first aired on ABC on September 21, 1970, with a game between the New York Jets and the Browns in Cleveland. Advertisers were charged US$65,000 per minute by ABC during the clash, a cost that proved to be a bargain when the contest collected 33% of the viewing audience. The Browns defeated the Jets, 31–21 in a game which featured a 94-yard kickoff return for a touchdown by the Browns' Homer Jones to open the second half, and was punctuated when Billy Andrews intercepted Joe Namath late in the fourth quarter and returned it 25 yards for the clinching touchdown. However, Cleveland viewers saw different programming on WEWS-TV, because of the NFL's blackout rules of the time (this would apply for all games through the end of the 1972 season; beginning in 1973, home games could be televised if tickets were sold out 72 hours before kickoff).

In 1971, Frank Gifford became available after his contract with CBS Sports concluded; Arledge brought him to ABC to serve as play-by-play announcer, replacing Jackson (who returned to broadcasting college football for the network, which he continued to do for the next 35 seasons). The former New York Giant had been an NFL analyst for CBS during the 1960s but had never called play-by-play prior to joining Monday Night Football. In that capacity for Monday Night Football from 1971 to 1985, Gifford was often criticized for his see-no-evil approach in regard to discussing the NFL, earning him the dubious nickname "Faultless Frank." Regardless, Gifford would have the longest tenure of any broadcaster on the show, lasting until 1998.

=== Coverage of the 1972 Munich massacre ===
In 1972, NBC showed the Winter Games from Sapporo, Japan, then ABC returned to carry the Summer Games in Munich, Germany. It was during the Summer Games that Palestinian terrorists attacked the Olympic Village and killed 11 Israeli athletes. Although Chris Schenkel was the actual host of the Games that year, Arledge assigned the story to McKay largely because he was a local news anchor in Baltimore, Maryland prior to joining CBS (and later ABC). McKay was joined on set by ABC news correspondent (and former and future evening news anchor) Peter Jennings, and coverage continued for many hours, until the outcome was known. Howard Cosell went with the film crew to get interviews in the village. McKay later won an Emmy Award for his coverage.

We just got the final word ... you know, when I was a kid, my father used to say "Our greatest hopes and our worst fears are seldom realized." Our worst fears have been realized tonight. They've now said that there were eleven hostages. Two were killed in their rooms yesterday morning, nine were killed at the airport tonight. They're all gone.

— Jim McKay

By the time the 1976 edition of the Winter Games came around, McKay was now installed at the host, a role he would play throughout the 1970s and 1980s.

=== ABC's coverage of NASCAR and the Daytona 500 ===
From 1962 to 1978, the Daytona 500 was shown on ABC's Wide World of Sports. During the 1960s and early 1970s, the race was filmed and an edited highlight package aired the following weekend. In 1974, ABC began the first semi-live coverage (joined-in-progress) of the Daytona 500. Coverage was normally timed to begin when the race was halfway over. Brief taped highlights of the start and early segments were shown, then ABC joined the race live already in progress, picking up approximately the last 90 minutes of the race. This format continued through 1978.

The 1976 race was held on the same day of the final day of competition in the Winter Olympics (also broadcast on ABC). ABC carried 30 minutes of live coverage of the start of the race, then switched to the Olympics for 90 minutes to carry taped coverage of the final two competitive events (a cross-country ski race and the final runs in the bobsled), held earlier that day. Then it was back to Daytona for about an hour-and-a-half for the finish.

ESPN began showing NASCAR races in 1981, with the first event being at North Carolina Speedway. The last of its 265 Cup telecasts (that number includes some on ABC Sports) was the 2000 Atlanta fall race (now the Folds of Honor QuikTrip 500).

=== ABC launches Monday Night Baseball ===
In 1976, ABC picked up the television rights for Monday Night Baseball games from NBC. For most of its time on ABC, the Monday night games were held on "dead travel days" when few games were scheduled. The team owners liked that arrangement as the national telecasts didn't compete against their stadium box offices. ABC on the other hand, found the arrangement far more complicated. ABC often had only one or two games to pick from for each telecast from a schedule designed by Major League Baseball. While trying to give all of the teams national exposure, ABC ended up with far too many games between sub .500 clubs from small markets. Reviewing the network's first two weeks of coverage for Sports Illustrated, William Leggett opined: "It may be unfair to say that Monday Night Baseball, as it has been presented by ABC so far this season, is the worst television treatment ever given a major sport, because by all odds somebody at sometime must have done something worse. But it is difficult to remember when or where that might have happened."

Just like with Monday Night Football, ABC brought in the concept of the three-man-booth (originally with Bob Prince, Bob Uecker, and Warner Wolf as the primary crew) to their baseball telecasts. Said ABC Sports head Roone Arledge "It'll take something different for it to work - i.e. curb viewership yawns and lulls with Uecker as the real difference", so Arledge reportedly hoped. Prince disclosed to his broadcasting partner Jim Woods about his early worries about calling a network series for the first time. Prince for one, didn't have as much creative control over the broadcasts on ABC as he did calling Pittsburgh Pirates games on KDKA radio. ABC's coverage for such things as its camera work (they often followed fly balls like they did golf shots, keeping the focus on the ball) and its choice of announcers: Bob Prince was accused of a National League bias, while Bob Uecker was considered to be just a Don Meredith clone.

Bob Prince was gone by the fall of 1976, with Keith Jackson, Howard Cosell, and guest analyst Reggie Jackson calling that year's American League Championship Series. (Warner Wolf, Al Michaels and guest analyst Tom Seaver worked the NLCS.) On the subject of his dismissal from ABC, Bob Prince said "I hated Houston, and ABC never let me be Bob Prince." president of abc sports,

In 1979, the start of ABC's Monday Night Baseball coverage was moved back to June, due to poor ratings during the May sweeps period. In place of April and May prime time games, ABC began airing Sunday Afternoon Baseball games in September. The network also aired one Friday night game (Yankees at Angels) on July 13 of that year.

=== Coverage of the North American Soccer League and the FIFA World Cup ===
In 1979, ABC Sports began covering the NASL in a deal that called for 9 telecasts of league games, including the playoffs and Soccer Bowl. After enduring briefly during the late 1970s, attendances dropped after 1980. The sport's popularity fell and the media lost interest. The deal with ABC to broadcast NASL matches was also lost in 1980, and the 1981 Soccer Bowl was only shown on tape delay. All of the franchises quickly became unprofitable, and a salary cap enforced before the 1984 season only delayed the inevitable.

In 1982, PBS and ESPN provided the first thorough American television coverage of the FIFA World Cup. ABC aired the first live telecast of the final. ABC aired commercials during the live action. Meanwhile, PBS aired same day highlights of the top game of the day.

== 1980s ==
=== The Miracle on Ice ===
The 1980 Winter Olympics was the setting for the "Miracle on Ice", a medal-round men's ice hockey game in Lake Placid, New York, on February 22. The United States team, made up of amateur and collegiate players and led by coach Herb Brooks, defeated the Soviet team, which consisted of veteran professional players with significant experience in international play. The rest of the United States (except those who watched the game live on Canadian television) had to wait to see the game, as ABC decided to broadcast the late-afternoon game on tape delay in prime time. Sportscaster Al Michaels, who was calling the game on ABC along with former Montreal Canadiens goalie Ken Dryden, picked up on the countdown in his broadcast, and delivered his famous call:

Eleven seconds, you've got ten seconds, the countdown going on right now! Morrow, up to Silk. Five seconds left in the game. Do you believe in miracles? YES!

During the broadcast wrap-up after the game, ABC Olympic sports anchor Jim McKay compared the American victory over the Soviet professionals to a group of Canadian college football players defeating the Pittsburgh Steelers (the recent Super Bowl champions and at the height of their dynasty).

=== Breaking the news of John Lennon's murder ===
On the evening of December 8, 1980, English musician John Lennon, formerly of the Beatles, was fatally shot in the archway of the Dakota, his residence in New York City. When Roone Arledge, who was presiding over ABC's telecast of Monday Night Football in his capacity as its executive producer, received word of Lennon's death, a game between the New England Patriots and the Miami Dolphins was tied with less than a minute left in the fourth quarter and the Patriots were driving toward the potential winning score. As the Patriots tried to put themselves in position for a field goal, Arledge informed Frank Gifford and Howard Cosell of the shooting and suggested that they be the ones to report on the murder. Cosell, who had interviewed Lennon during a Monday Night Football broadcast in 1974, was chosen to do so but was apprehensive of it at first, as he felt the game should take precedence and that it was not their place to break such a big story. Gifford convinced Cosell otherwise, saying that he should not "hang on to (the news)" as the significance of the event was much greater than the finish of the game.

The following exchange began with thirty seconds left in the fourth quarter, shortly after Gifford and Cosell had been informed of what had transpired:

Cosell: ... but [the game]'s suddenly been placed in total perspective for us. I'll finish this; they're in the hurry-up offense.

Gifford: Third down, four. [Chuck] Foreman ... it'll be fourth down. [Matt] Cavanaugh will let it run down for one final attempt; he'll let the seconds tick off to give Miami no opportunity whatsoever. (Whistle blows.) Timeout is called with three seconds remaining; John Smith is on the line. And I don't care what's on the line, Howard, you have got to say what we know in the booth.

Cosell: Yes, we have to say it. Remember this is just a football game, no matter who wins or loses. An unspeakable tragedy confirmed to us by ABC News in New York City: John Lennon, outside of his apartment building on the West Side of New York City—the most famous, perhaps, of all of the Beatles—shot twice in the back, rushed to Roosevelt Hospital, dead on arrival. Hard to go back to the game after that newsflash, which, in duty bound, we have to take. Frank?

Gifford: (after a pause) Indeed, it is.

=== Sports journalism and ABC SportsBeat magazine show ===
In the fall of 1981, Cosell debuted a serious investigative 30-minute magazine show, ABC SportsBeat on ABC's weekend schedule. He made news and covered topics that were not part of general sports coverage - including the first story about drugs in professional sports (the story of former Minnesota Viking Carl Eller's cocaine use), an in-depth look at how NFL owners negotiated tax breaks and incentives for building new stadiums, and together with Arthur Ashe, an investigation into apartheid and sports. Though ratings were low, Cosell and his staff earned three Emmy Awards for excellence in reporting, and broke new ground in sports journalism. At the time, ABC SportsBeat was the first and only regularly scheduled network program devoted solely to sports journalism.

To produce this pioneering program, Cosell recruited a number of employees from outside the ranks of those that produced games, who he felt might be too invested in the success of the athletes and leagues to look at the hard news. He brought in Michael Marley, then a sportswriter for The Washington Post, Lawrie Mifflin, a writer for The New York Times, and a 20-year old researcher who quickly rose to an associate producer, Alexis Denny. As a sophomore at Yale University, Ms. Denny had been a student in a seminar that Cosell taught on the "Business of Big-Time Sports in America", and was selected by the Director of Monday Night Football to join their production crew. She took her junior year off to join Cosell's staff at ABC Headquarters in New York City, and produced multiple segments, including in 1983 a half-hour special report previewing the 1984 Olympic Games in Los Angeles. Despite the games being one of ABC's biggest investments, with a record-breaking 225 million dollar rights fee at the time, the 30-minute documentary-style program produced by Denny showed multiple sides of the questions about the viability of the Games themselves - from concerns about traffic, pollution and terrorism, to a look at how the sponsorship deals were structured.

=== ABC's coverage of golf ===
ABC broadcast golf events for the first time in 1962 when it began televising the Open Championship as part of its anthology series Wide World of Sports. ABC later gained the broadcast rights to the PGA Championship in 1965, and the U.S. Open in 1966. Chris Schenkel and Byron Nelson were the initial hosts of the tournament coverage. In 1975, Jim McKay and Dave Marr became the lead broadcast team, while Bob Rosburg joined the network as the first ever on-course reporter, and Peter Alliss joined as a co-anchor.

Beginning in 1982, ABC adopted its most well-known format of the Wide World of Sports era. The broadcast operated using anchor teams, in which an anchor and an analyst would call all of the action from the tower at the 18th hole, and the teams would be rotated on coverage after about a half-hour. Meanwhile, the three on-course reporters, which included Judy Rankin and Ed Sneed in addition to Rosburg, would be utilized when prompted by the anchor team. McKay and Marr would be the lead team, with Jack Whitaker and Alliss as the second team. Occasionally, Rosburg or Whitaker would host if McKay was unavailable, while Roger Twibell would take over the secondary team. After his 1986 Masters win, Jack Nicklaus would appear on ABC after the end of his round and served as an analyst for the rest of the telecast.

=== ABC's stint with the USFL ===
On Sunday, March 6, 1983, ABC televised three games. The Los Angeles Express and New Jersey Generals played in the primary regional televised USFL game, with the Express winning, 20–15. ABC also televised the Chicago Blitz at Washington Federals and the Philadelphia Stars at Denver Gold.

According to an ABC spokesman, the network averaged a 6.0 rating for their first USFL season. This was slightly better than the network's coverage of the first American Football League football season back in 1960. In its second year, AFL games on ABC averaged a 6.1 rating, and in 1962, the third year, a 6.5. The coverage was nonetheless quite low for a Big Three television network, with a June 17 prime-time regular season game between Chicago and Birmingham finishing as the lowest-rated prime time broadcast of the week, with a 4.8 rating.

ABC offered the USFL a 4-year, $175 million television deal to play in the spring in 1986. By this point, the league had driven out most of the owners who would have been willing to accept those terms. The owners in the league walked away from what averaged out to $67 million per year starting in 1986 to pursue their big picture—merger with the NFL.

=== The deregulation of college football on television begins ===
In June 1984, a US Supreme Court ruling ended the control that the NCAA had exercised on televised college football and allowed individual colleges to make their own television deals. CBS obtained rights to Big 10 and Pac 10 home games while ABC obtained rights to the College Football Association (essentially home games for all schools other than the B10 and P10). CBS also separately obtained rights to Boston College-Miami and Army-Navy. CBS and ABC typically carried only 1-2 games per time slot rather than the frequent large slates of regional games in prior years. Meanwhile, ESPN carried live CFA games each Saturday typically at noon and 7:30 p.m. WTBS carried SEC games. USA Network also carried games (primarily the Big 8).

=== The end of Howard Cosell's tenure on Monday Night Football and later ABC ===
Cosell continued to draw criticism during Monday Night Football with one of his offhand comments during the September 5, 1983 game, igniting a controversy and laying the groundwork for his departure at the end of that season. In a game between the Washington Redskins and Dallas Cowboys, Cosell referred to Alvin Garrett, an African American wide receiver for the Redskins, as a "little monkey." Cosell noted that Garrett's small stature, and not his race, was the basis for his comment, citing the fact that he had used the term to describe his grandchildren. Later, a special on Howard Cosell showed him calling Mike Adamle (a white player) a "little monkey." Stung by the unrelenting barrage of remarks, Cosell claimed upon his departure from Monday Night Football that the NFL had become "a stagnant bore." In Cosell's book, I Never Played the Game, he devoted an entire chapter ("Monkey Business") to the Garrett episode. In the book, Cosell also said that ABC should have had the right to choose its own Monday Night schedule. In his mind, Monday Night Football is what elevated the NFL in popularity over Major League Baseball. He felt that this should have been ABC's reward for raising the league's profile.

After Cosell's memoir I Never Played the Game, which, among other things, chronicled his disenchantment with fellow ABC commentators, was published in September 1985, Cosell was taken off scheduled announcing duties for that year's World Series and was dismissed by ABC television shortly thereafter. Cosell's book was seen by some as a bitter "hate rant" against those who had offended him. TV Guide published excerpts of his memoirs and reported that they had never had as many viewers' responses and they were overwhelmingly negative towards Cosell. The magazine reported some of the "printable" ones saying things such as "Will Rogers never met Howard Cosell".

In I Never Played the Game, Cosell popularized the word "jockocracy" (originally coined by author Robert Lipsyte), describing how athletes were given announcing jobs that they had not earned. Coincidentally, he was replaced for the 1985 World Series broadcast by Tim McCarver, himself a former baseball player, to join Al Michaels and Jim Palmer. (The title of the book is a double entendre, meaning that Cosell never actually played the game of football or any other professional sport he broadcast as well as implying that he never played the "game" of corporate politics.) Cosell is notably absent from the Pro Football Hall of Fame.

=== ABC airs its very first Super Bowl ===
As a result of the 1982 television contract signed by the NFL with the three networks, this game was the first Super Bowl to be televised in the United States by ABC, as they earned their first turn at the Super Bowl, with a new alternation process started for the 1983 game. Previously, the Super Bowl telecast alternated between CBS and NBC, while the networks simulcast the first AFL-NFL World Championship Game.

Frank Gifford was the play-by-play announcer, while then-ABC Sports analyst Don Meredith and then-Washington Redskins quarterback Joe Theismann served as color commentators. Al Michaels and Jim Lampley hosted the pregame (2 hours), halftime, and postgame (Lampley presided over the Vince Lombardi Trophy presentation ceremony) coverage for ABC. Michaels and Lampley were joined by analysts O. J. Simpson (who would normally have been the second color commentator; when interviewed as to why Theismann would join Gifford and Meredith in the booth instead of Simpson; director Chet Forte was quoted in the January 14, 1985, edition of Broadcasting Magazine as saying that Theismann could contribute more due to having played both teams in the regular-season as well as having played in the two previous Super Bowls.) and Tom Landry (in a separate booth during the game). Also helping out with ABC's coverage were Jack Whitaker, Dick Schaap, Donna de Varona, Ray Gandolf, and ABC News reporters Stone Phillips, Jeff Greenfield, Judd Rose, and Bill Redeker.

This would be the only ABC Super Bowl for Gifford as play-by-play announcer, the final game for Don Meredith and the second (and last) time a commentator for the Super Bowl (Theismann) was an active player (Jack Kemp in Super Bowl II was the only other active player to provide commentary). Michaels would call ABC's next six Super Bowls, until ABC lost their NFL rights in 2006.

=== ABC airs the Indianapolis 500 live for the first time ===
From 1965 to 1970, ABC televised a combination of filmed and/or taped recorded highlights of the race the following weekend on Wide World of Sports. The 1965 and 1966 presentations were in black-and-white, while all subsequent presentations have been in color.

From 1971 to 1985, the Indianapolis 500 was shown on a same-day tape delay basis. Races were edited down to a between two and three hour broadcast, and shown in prime time. It was also blacked out in the Indianapolis market until a later date. The broadcasts would typically open with the rendition of "Back Home Again in Indiana", and the starting command, but no other pre-race ceremonies. In addition, the broadcast was supplemented with some pre-recorded, in-depth featurettes, aired during down times. Later telecasts included live introductions at the top and bottom of the broadcast, with the closing segment sometimes an interview with the race winner, which by that time, had been revealed to the viewers. During this period, the announcers' commentary at both the start and finish of the race were recorded as those events transpired. However, the commentary of the middle parts of the race was semi-scripted, and recorded in post-production, and edited into the broadcast as it was being aired.

Starting in 1986, the race has been shown live in "flag-to-flag" coverage. In the Indianapolis market, as well as other parts of Indiana, the live telecast is blacked out and shown tape delayed to encourage live attendance.

On March 21, 2018, NBC Sports announced that it had acquired the television rights to the IndyCar Series (after previously serving as cable rightsholder through NBCSN or CNBC for races not aired by ABC), replacing the package of races on ABC with a package of eight races on NBC, including the Indianapolis 500 (ending ABC's 54-year tenure as broadcaster of the event).

ABC's final IndyCar telecast was the second race of the Detroit Grand Prix on June 3, 2018.

=== ABC finally centralizes the Triple Crown of thoroughbred racing ===
In 1977, ABC was awarded the contract to televise the Preakness. Triple Crown Productions was formed in 1985 after CBS terminated its contract with NYRA. ABC Sports won the rights to broadcast all three races, as well as a number of prep races. Ratings went up after the package was centralized. Other than the Kentucky Derby, the Preakness Stakes and Belmont Stakes were considered the two "other" races. ABC Sports, which had broadcast the Derby since 1975, wanted to televise all the races as a three race package. CBS Sports, which showed the other two races, had much lower ratings for them, with the possible exceptions of years in which the Crown was at stake like 1973, 1977, and 1978.

Combined broadcast arrangements with ABC continued until 2001, when NBC Sports took over.

=== Al Michaels joins Monday Night Football ===
Michaels served as the play-by-play announcer, teaming with Frank Gifford for a two-man booth in 1986. During that season, the Miami Dolphins again made records with the biggest blowout in Monday Night Football history in a 45–3 rout of the then 10-1 New York Jets (the record was later tied and subsequently broken in 2005; see below). Also in 1986, when Al Michaels became unavailable because he was calling Major League Baseball's League Championship Series, Frank Gifford moved up into the play-by-play spot while Lynn Swann or O. J. Simpson filled-in as the color commentator. Gifford would once again call the play-by-play when Michaels was busy calling the World Series in 1987 and 1989 and the National League Championship Series in 1988.

In 1987, Gifford and Michaels were joined by Dan Dierdorf, returning the series to its original concept of three announcers in the booth. The trio would last for 11 seasons through the conclusion of the 1997 season. In 1989, television composer Edd Kalehoff created a new arrangement of Johnny Pearson's "Heavy Action", by that time fully synonymous with the series. This more or less replaced an original composition by Charles Fox. Also debuting in 1989 was Hank Williams, Jr. performing "All My Rowdy Friends Are Here on Monday Night", sung to the music of his 1984 hit "All My Rowdy Friends Are Coming Over Tonight."

=== The beginning of ABC's regular college basketball package ===
When ABC's coverage began in 1987, ABC primarily covered the Big Ten, Big 8 and Pac-10 Conferences. By 1991 (around the time NBC was phasing out their own college basketball coverage), ABC ramped up its basketball coverage in an effort to fill the void. As a result, ABC also started to cover games focusing on teams from the Atlantic Coast Conference (ACC) and Southeastern Conference (SEC). Otherwise, it was essentially, a considerable hodge-podge with an ACC game one week, or a Pac-10 or Big 10 game the next. The games that were broadcast were a hodge-podge of conference matchups even after the ESPN on ABC brand change, with SEC and Big East match-ups occasionally being shown alongside frequent ACC, Big 12 and Pac-10 match-ups.

ABC's early regular season broadcasts were, for the most part, technically time buys from organizations such as Raycom (particularly, around 1990–91) or sister network ESPN. This in return, was a way to avoid union contracts which require that 100% of network shows had to use crew staff who were network union members. During the early 1990s, Raycom paid ABC US$1.8 million for six weeks of network airtime of 26 regional games. The format allowed Raycom to control the games and sell the advertising.

In the 1987–88 season, ABC did not air any college basketball games during the last three weekends of February due to the network's coverage of the Winter Olympics. As previously mentioned, coverage by ABC steadily increased during the early 1990s; by the 1991–92 season, ABC was carrying regional games in a number of timeslots on Saturday and Sunday afternoons. By 1997, ABC's presenting sponsor was Paine Webber.

=== ABC broadcasts its final Olympic Games ===
The Calgary Winter Olympics were the first winter games to earn a significant television revenue base; where the 1980 Lake Placid Games generated only US$20.7 million worldwide, OCO'88 generated $324.9 million in broadcast rights. The overwhelming majority of television revenues came from ABC, which agreed in 1984 to pay $309 million for American television rights, over three times the $91.5 million it paid for the 1984 Winter Olympics in Sarajevo. The deal, at the time the highest amount ever paid for a sporting event, allowed organizers to announce the Games would be debt-free. The CTV Television Network paid C$4.5 million for Canadian rights and to act as the host broadcaster. The games were also televised on CBC. While western European nations paid US$5.7 million combined.

OCO'88 made several alterations to the Olympic program as part of efforts to ensure value for its broadcast partners. Premier events, including ice hockey and figure skating, were scheduled for prime time and the Games were lengthened to 16 days from the previous 12 to ensure three weekends of coverage. However, a significant downturn in advertising revenue for sporting events resulted in ABC forecasting significant financial losses on the Games. Calgary organizers appreciated their fortunate timing in signing the deal. King described the timing of the contract with ABC as "the passing of the sun and the moon at the right time for Calgary." ABC lost an estimated $60 million, and broadcast rights to the 1992 Winter Olympics were later sold to the CBS network for $243 million, a 20% reduction compared to Calgary.

The network, at the insistence of new owner Capital Cities Communications (much to the chagrin of Roone Arledge's successor at ABC Sports, Dennis Swanson), opted not to bid for the rights to show any future Games. Subsequently, The Walt Disney Company acquired Capital Cities-ABC in 1995 and began the process of putting more effort into the branding of ABC's sports channel ESPN than of ABC Sports itself.

=== ABC loses the baseball package to CBS and the 1989 World Series earthquake ===
In 1989 (the final year of ABC's contract with Major League Baseball), ABC moved the baseball telecasts to Thursday nights in hopes of getting leg up against NBC's Cosby Show. After braving the traumatic Loma Prieta earthquake and an all-time low 16.4 rating for the 1989 World Series, Al Michaels took ABC's loss of baseball to CBS as "tough to accept." Michaels added that "baseball was such an early stepchild at ABC and had come such a long way." Gary Thorne, who served as ABC's backup play-by-play announcer in 1989 and was an on-field reporter for the World Series that year (and covering the trophy presentation in the process), simply laughed while saying "Great reviews, just as ABC baseball ends."

Game 3 of the 1989 World Series (initially scheduled for October 17) was delayed by ten days due to the Loma Prieta earthquake. The earthquake struck at approximately 5:04 p.m. Pacific Time. At the moment the quake struck, ABC's color commentator Tim McCarver was narrating taped highlights of the previous Series game. Viewers saw the video signal begin to break up, heard McCarver repeat a sentence as the shaking distracted him, and heard McCarver's colleague Al Michaels exclaim, "I'll tell you what, we're having an earth—." At that moment, the feed from Candlestick Park was lost. The network put up a green ABC Sports graphic as the audio was switched to a telephone link. Michaels had to pick up a POTS phone in the press booth (phones work off a separate power supply) and call ABC headquarters in New York, at which point they put him back on the air. Michaels cracked, "Well folks, that's the greatest open in the history of television, bar none!" accompanied by the excited screams of fans who had no idea of the devastation elsewhere.

After about a 15-minute delay (ABC aired a rerun of Roseanne and subsequently, The Wonder Years in the meantime), ABC was able to regain power via a backup generator. ABC's play-by-play man, Al Michaels (who was familiar with the San Francisco Bay Area dating back to his days working for the San Francisco Giants from 1974-1976) then proceeded to relay reports to Ted Koppel at ABC News' headquarters in Washington, D.C. Al Michaels was ultimately nominated for an Emmy for his on-site reporting at the World Series.

== 1990s ==
=== The Pan American Games from Havana, Cuba ===
ABC was the first American television network to broadcast the Pan American Games in 1963, when they devoted one episode of their Wide World of Sports anthology program to the games.

In 1991, ABC sought the rights to the Pan Am Games in Havana. The negotiations became bogged down in the U.S. embargo against Cuba, which forbade direct payments to Cuba. After a protracted negotiation with the U.S. Justice Department, ABC eventually inked a deal to broadcast the games. (The fee was paid indirectly to avoid the embargo. ABC partnered with Ted Turner's TNT cable channel for the Havana games. TNT aired the prime time coverage with Ernie Johnson Jr. as host, while Brent Musburger (who had been fired by CBS in March 1990) anchored ABC's weekend afternoon coverage. This would be the last time the games were broadcast by a major broadcast network in the United States. All coverage since has aired on cable or Spanish-language networks.

=== ABC's alignment with the CFA and the Bowl Championship Series ===
In 1991, ABC acquired the rights to the CFA from CBS in addition to the B10/P10 and went back to televising several regional games in a number of timeslots. Meanwhile, Notre Dame broke apart from the CFA and signed a deal with NBC for its home games. 1992 was the first year that ABC made most of its regional games available via pay-per-view (similar to what became known as ESPN GamePlan). In 1996, CBS obtained rights to the SEC, Big East, and Army/Navy Game and also added a Conference USA game. ABC however, still had rights to the SEC title game.

In 1998, ABC was awarded the first exclusive Bowl Championship Series television contract beginning with the 1999 series. In 2005, ABC lost rights to most of the BCS games, including the BCS National Championship Game, to Fox beginning with the 2006-07 series, in a deal worth close to $20 million per game. Although due to a separate arrangement with the Pasadena Tournament of Roses Association, ABC retained the broadcast rights to events in the series that were held at the Rose Bowl stadium, such as the Rose Bowl Game and the 2010 BCS Championship. ABC sister network ESPN assumed the BCS rights, including the rights to the Rose Bowl, beginning in 2010.

Keith Jackson, who was supposed to retire after the 1998 season, stayed with the network until 2005, in which he announced games televised primarily from the West Coast, where he was based; Jackson's last broadcast with the network was the 2006 Rose Bowl.

In 1999, as Jackson reduced his schedule, ABC began the year with the team of Jackson and Bob Griese intact – albeit not as the lead announcing team, as they almost exclusively handled action from Pac-10 Conference teams; Brent Musburger and Dan Fouts returned, as did the longtime tandem of Brad Nessler and Gary Danielson. These assignments were not permanent and multiple different combinations were used ABC locked its broadcasting teams in mid-season. Jackson was teamed with Fouts, Musburger was paired with Danielson, and Nessler with Bob Griese.

=== Counter programming the Winter Olympics with boxing ===
In 1992, ABC announced plans to counterprogram the Winter Olympics on CBS with boxing, a sport at that point, seldom seen on network television. This particular boxing series was sponsored by Fruit of the Loom. ABC proceeded to forgo the typical $300,000 rights fees of the prior year, and instead, set a $75,000 limit and scheduled three consecutive Saturdays of action.

=== Baseball temporarily returns to ABC ===
After a four-year-long hiatus (when CBS exclusively carried the over-the-air Major League Baseball television rights), ABC (again, alongside NBC) returned to baseball in 1994.

Under a six-year plan, Major League Baseball was intended to receive 85% of the first $140 million in advertising revenue (or 87.5% of advertising revenues and corporate sponsorship from the games until sales top a specified level), 50% of the next $30 million, and 80% of any additional money. Prior to this, Major League Baseball was projected to take a projected 55% cut in rights fees and receive a typical rights fee from the networks.

After NBC was finished with their post-1994 All-Star Game six-week baseball coverage, ABC (with a reunited Al Michaels, Tim McCarver, and Jim Palmer as the primary crew) then picked up where NBC left off by televising six more regular season games. Joining the team of Michaels, McCarver, and Palmer was Lesley Visser, who served as the lead field reporter for the CBS' baseball coverage from 1990 to 1993. Visser was reuniting with McCarver, for whom she had worked with on CBS. The regular season games fell under the Baseball Night in America umbrella which premiered on July 16, 1994.

In even-numbered years, NBC had the rights to the All-Star Game and both League Championship Series while ABC had the World Series and newly created Division Series. In odd-numbered years, the postseason and All-Star Game television rights were supposed to alternate.

The long-term plans for The Baseball Network crumbled when the players went on strike on August 12, 1994 (thus forcing the cancellation of the World Series). In July 1995, ABC and NBC, who wound up having to share the duties of televising the 1995 World Series as a way to recoup (with ABC broadcasting Games 1, 4, and 5 and NBC broadcasting Games 2, 3, and 6), announced that they were opting out of their agreement with Major League Baseball. Both networks figured that as the delayed 1995 baseball season opened without a labor agreement, there was no guarantee against another strike. Both networks soon publicly vowed to cut all ties with Major League Baseball for the remainder of the 20th century.

=== Joining forces with the World League of American Football, Major League Soccer and the Arena Football League ===
ABC Sports broadcast some games in both seasons, mostly on Sunday afternoons. ABC showed the 1991 World Bowl, while USA Network carried the game in 1992.

The reported cost of the contracts varied – the Los Angeles Times said that ABC had paid $28 million for two years, and USA $25 million. For the 1992 season the WLAF charged each network less for broadcasting rights; The New York Times reported that ABC's annual fee went down from $12 million to $3 million, and USA's from $14 million to $10 million. The ABC coverage's average ratings fell from 1991 to 1992, from around 2.1 to 1.7, and USA's from 1.2 to 1.1. Both networks asked the WLAF to expand into two major U.S. markets for 1993.

Major League Soccer with ESPN and ABC Sports announced the league's first television rights deal on March 15, 1994, without any players, coaches, or teams in place. The three-year agreement covered English-language broadcasting for the 1996–1998 seasons, and committed 10 games on ESPN, 25 on ESPN2, and the MLS Cup on ABC. The deal gave MLS no rights fees, but the advertising revenue was divided between the league and networks.

ABC (under the Wide World of Sports umbrella) aired the ArenaBowl five consecutive years from 1998–02.

=== Overhauling ABC's golf coverage ===
In 1990, Roger Twibell took over as lead anchor, with Dave Marr as his analyst. Peter Alliss became sole anchor of the second anchor team. During this period, ABC acquired the rights to several non-major PGA Tour events, mostly important events such as the Memorial Tournament and The Tour Championship. 1990 would also mark the final PGA Championship to be broadcast by ABC.

In 1992, Brent Musburger, who had been heavily criticized for his hosting of golf coverage while with CBS, took over as host. Marr was dismissed from the network, while Twibell was reassigned to ESPN's golf coverage, although he occasionally hosted on ABC for a few lower-level tournaments. The format was also reorganized to more emphasize the on-course reporters. Steve Melnyk moved over from CBS to become lead analyst; however, Alliss would anchor for stretches during the telecast. Beyond the team in the booth, all of ABC's other voices were on the course, including Rankin, Rosburg and newcomer Mark Rolfing.

After facing much criticism for its golf coverage, especially Jack Nicklaus' involvement and Musburger's perceived lack of knowledge of the game, ABC decided to completely overhaul its visual presentation, becoming more in line with cable partner ESPN, while changing the format for its coverage to be more of the standard in line with the other networks, featuring a lead anchor team, announcers assigned to individual holes, and on-course reporters. Mike Tirico became the host, with Curtis Strange serving as lead analyst. Steve Melnyk, Peter Alliss and Ian Baker-Finch became hole announcers, while Bob Rosburg, Judy Rankin and Rolfing were the primary on-course reporters.

ABC continued its renewed commitment to golf when it reached a new television contract in 1999 in which the network gained the broadcast rights to a number of events, including the entire fall PGA Tour season and two of the new World Golf Championships events. ABC partnered with ESPN on much of its coverage, with ESPN carrying the early rounds of tournament events that ABC broadcast, in addition to those that were part of the cable channel's own schedule; the ABC team would work the cable telecasts in these cases.

Beginning in 1999, ABC aired a series of match play golf challenge matches on Monday nights. All the matches have involved World Number 1 Tiger Woods, and the first seven were run by his representatives IMG. Monday Night Golf proved to be an initial success, drawing more viewers than the final round of the U.S. Open, and being second only to the final round of the Masters Tournament in terms of golf broadcasts. Ratings increased significantly for the second match, but they declined rapidly after that, and the event was initially cancelled after the 2005 edition, with Woods also wishing to take a break from the event.

=== The end of the Pro Bowlers Tour on ABC and Wide World of Sports ===
Although the Professional Bowlers Tour maintained high ratings throughout most of its years, ABC (which was transitioning to new management after being purchased by The Walt Disney Company in 1996) opted against renewing its contract with the PBA primarily due to the overall decline of the sport in the late 1980s and 1990s. This was partially attributed to the explosion of sports viewing choices in the 1990s, especially on cable television, the lack of any one bowling star to follow, and an aging audience for televised bowling. (Research in 1997 showed that 67% of the viewing audience for network television bowling was at least 50 years old.)

The final PBT broadcast aired on June 21, 1997, at the St. Clair Classic in Fairview Heights, Ill. that was won by Walter Ray Williams Jr. It was an emotional broadcast in which Williams Jr. and Pete Weber, the game's two giants at the time, battled it out until the very end.

In later years, with the rise of cable television offering more outlets for sports programming, Wide World of Sports lost a number of the events that had been staples of the program for many years (many, although not all, of them ended up on ESPN, a sister network to ABC for most of its existence). Ultimately, on January 3, 1998, Jim McKay announced that Wide World of Sports, in its traditional anthology series, had been canceled after a 37-year run. The Wide World of Sports name remained in use afterward as an umbrella title for ABC's weekend sports programming.

=== Major changes at Monday Night Football ===
In 1997, ABC began using a scoring bug showing the game clock and score throughout the entire broadcast.

For the 1998 season, ABC pushed Monday Night Football back an hour (it has usually aired at 9:00 p.m. Eastern Time). A special pre-game show was created, Monday Night Blast, hosted by Chris Berman from the ESPN Zone restaurant in Baltimore. The game would start around 8:20 p.m. Eastern for this particular season. Despite leaving the booth, Frank Gifford stayed on one more year as a special contributor to the pre-game show, usually presenting a single segment.

Beginning in 1999, Monday Night Football telecasts used a computer-generated yellow line to mark where a team needs to get a first down, a method first used by ABC sister cable channel ESPN. 1999 also saw the Pro Football Hall of Fame Game being moved from Saturday afternoon to Monday night. It would remain on Monday night through 2005.

== 2000s ==
=== ABC lands the NHL ===
In the 1992–93 season, ABC televised five weekly playoff telecasts, with three weeks of regional coverage of various games and two national games on Sunday afternoons starting on April 18 and ending on May 16. This marked the first time that playoff National Hockey League games were broadcast on American network television since 1975 (when NBC was the NHL's American broadcast television partner).

In the 1993–94 season, ABC televised six weekly regional telecasts on the last three Sunday afternoons beginning on March 27, 1994, marking the first time that regular season National Hockey League games were broadcast on American network television since NBC did it in 1974–75. ABC then televised three weeks worth of playoff games on first three Sundays – the final game was Game 1 of the Eastern Conference Semifinals between the Boston Bruins and the New Jersey Devils, a game that was aired nationally. The network did not televise the Stanley Cup Final, which instead, were televised nationally by ESPN and by Prime Ticket in Los Angeles (1993) and MSG Network in New York (1994). Games televised on ABC were not subject to blackout.

These broadcasts (just as was the case with the 1999–2004 package) were essentially, time-buys by ESPN. In other words, ABC would sell three-hour blocks of airtime to ESPN, which in return, would produce, supply broadcasters and sell advertising.

In August 1998, ABC, ESPN and ESPN2 signed a five-year television deal with the NHL, worth a total of approximately US$600 million (or $120 million per year). The $120 million per year that ABC and ESPN paid for rights dwarfed the $5.5 million that the NHL received from American national broadcasts in the 1991–92 season. ABC's terms of this deal included: rights to the NHL All-Star Game, 4 to 5 weeks of regular season action, with three games a week, weekend Stanley Cup Playoff games, and the rest of the Stanley Cup Final.

Following the 2003–04 season, ESPN was only willing to renew its contract for two additional years at $60 million per year. ABC refused to televise the Stanley Cup Final in prime time, suggesting that the Finals games it would telecast be played on weekend afternoons (including a potential Game 7). Disney executives later conceded that they overpaid for the 1999–2004 deal, so the company's offer to renew the television rights was lower in 2004.

=== ABC airs its final boxing card ===
Prior to the advent of Wide World of Sports, multiple major heavyweight boxing title matches were televised via "closed-circuit" (this generally meant that you had go to a movie theater to see it, pay a decent-sized amount of money to get it, and then watch it on a giant screen). Often, Wide World of Sports would show full-length replays of the fights a week or two later; these replays were usually called by Howard Cosell, who became one of the best-known (and possibly most controversial) sportscaster in American television history.

ABC's final boxing card occurred on June 17, 2000 with José Luis Castillo upsetting Stevie Johnston in the lightweight championship bout in Bell Gardens, California.

Seven years after ABC's last boxing card, they were scheduled to broadcast a card from Boardwalk Hall in Atlantic City, New Jersey on April 22, 2007. The card would've featured former light heavyweight champion Antonio Tarver facing off against Elvir Muriqi. Promoter Joe DeGuardia of Star Boxing had been working on the time buy deal. The production would've been handled by ABC's sister company, ESPN with Friday Night Fights commentators Joe Tessitore and Teddy Atlas.

=== Dan Fouts, Dennis Miller and later John Madden join Monday Night Football ===
Unexpectedly, comedian Dennis Miller joined the cast in 2000, along with Dan Fouts. The move was ultimately regarded as a bust by a number of viewers and commentators. ABC briefly considered adding radio personality Rush Limbaugh before Miller was added to the broadcast team, despite having no prior sports broadcast experience (Limbaugh would instead be assigned as a commentator to Sunday NFL Countdown on ABC sister ESPN). Miller demonstrated a knowledge of the game and its personalities, although at times he tended to lapse into sometimes obscure analogy-riddled streams of consciousness similar to the "rants" of his standup comedy act. ABC even set up a webpage dedicated to explaining Miller's sometimes obscure pop culture references. Soon, it would become apparent that Miller's comedy did not mix with football.

In 2002, both Dennis Miller and Dan Fouts were dropped and John Madden joined Al Michaels in a two-man booth. Madden was a coach for the Oakland Raiders, namesake of the seminal Madden NFL video game series, and a successful broadcaster for 21 years – first with CBS until 1993 and then with Fox – before joining Monday Night Football.

=== ABC and ESPN outbids NBC for the NBA contract ===
In late 2001, the NBA was in the midst of putting together a new broadcast and cable television deal. At the time, conventional wisdom was that NBC would renew its existing broadcasting contract with the league. An October 5, 2001, Sports Business Daily article cited The New York Times sports columnist Richard Sandomir regarding the possibility of ESPN joining with ABC in obtaining a portion of the contract:

[it would be] difficult to imagine the NBA being so overwhelmed by an ESPN offer that it would let [ESPN] team up for a broadcast deal with ABC that would yield fewer games, promotion and exposure.

The negotiations were closely watched by those in the business world, as it was the first time that a major sports league crafted a television deal in the new economic environment since the September 11 terrorist attacks a few months before. Declining ratings for NBC's NBA game telecasts had already led some to believe that the NBA's next television rights fee would be lower than previous years, and the economic recession made that a likely scenario. As predicted, NBC's offer to the league was lower than the previous agreement's amount. Had the NBA agreed to the network's offer, it would have been the first sports league to experience a decline in rights fees. However, the NBA rejected NBC's offer and after the network's exclusive negotiating period with the league expired, ABC and ESPN stepped in. On January 22, 2002, the NBA signed a six-year deal with The Walt Disney Company and Turner Sports, which renewed an existing deal with TNT and allowed ABC and ESPN to acquire the rights to air the league's games. ABC and ESPN reportedly paid an average of about US$400 million a season. Technically, ESPN pays the NBA for its broadcast rights and "buys" time on ABC to air select games (this is noted in copyright tags during the end credits at the conclusion of the telecasts, saying "The preceding program has been paid for by ESPN, Inc.") In all, the contract allowed the NBA to increase its rights fees by 25%.

In June 2007, and again in October 2014, the NBA renewed its television agreement with ESPN, as well as TNT, with the current contract extending through the 2024–25 season.

=== The end of Monday Night Football on ABC ===
Despite high ratings, ABC lost millions of dollars on televising the games during the late 1990s and 2000s. The NFL also indicated that it wanted Sunday night to be the new night for its marquee game, because more people tend to watch television on Sundays, and games held on that night would be more conducive to flexible scheduling, a method by which some of the NFL's best games could be moved from the afternoon to the evening on Sunday on short notice. Given these factors, as well as the rise of ABC's ratings on Sunday night, and the network's wish of protecting its Desperate Housewives franchise (which they knew would be costly), on April 18, 2005, ABC and the NFL announced the end of their 36-year partnership, with the Monday Night Football broadcasts being moved to ESPN starting with the 2006 season; the move was criticized by some of the Disney shareholders (as well as NFL fans and purists). However, ESPN's ability to collect subscription fees from cable and satellite providers, in addition to selling commercials, made it more likely that ESPN could turn a profit on NFL telecasts, as opposed to ABC's heavy losses.

The final Monday Night Football broadcast on ABC aired on December 26, 2005, when the New York Jets hosted the New England Patriots from Giants Stadium. Coincidentally, both the first and last ABC Monday Night Football game telecasts ended with a score of 31–21 with the Jets on the losing end. Vinny Testaverde holds the distinction of throwing the last touchdown pass in ABC's MNF telecast history; it was to wide receiver Laveranues Coles. Also, Testaverde's pass set an NFL record: most consecutive seasons with a touchdown pass, 19 seasons (1987–2005). Patriots linebacker Mike Vrabel set a record of note during that last ABC telecast, becoming the first player to catch two touchdown passes and record a quarterback sack in the same game. The final play of the ABC era was a Patriots kneeldown by 44-year-old reserve quarterback Doug Flutie. John Madden said at the show's ending:

They can take football away from ABC on Monday nights, but they can't take away the memories.

=== Being fully integrated into ESPN ===
In 1984, ABC reached an agreement with Getty Oil to acquire a controlling interest in ESPN, retaining 80% ownership and selling the remaining 20% to Nabisco. This 20% stake was later acquired by the Hearst Corporation, which continues to hold it. In 1985, ABC itself was acquired by Capital Cities Communications for $3.5 billion, with the deal finalized in February 1986. Under Getty ownership, the channel was unable to compete for the television rights to major sports events contracts as its majority corporate parent would not provide the funding, leading ESPN to lose out for broadcast deals with the National Hockey League (to USA Network) and NCAA Division I college football (to TBS). For years, the NFL, NBA and Major League Baseball refused to consider cable as a means of broadcasting some of their games. However, with the backing of ABC, ESPN's ability to compete for major sports contracts greatly increased, and gave it credibility within the sports broadcasting industry.

In February 1996, The Walt Disney Company purchased Capital Cities/ABC for $19 billion, and assumed the latter company's 80% stake in ESPN at that time. According to an analysis published by Barron's Magazine in February 2008, ESPN "is probably worth more than 40% of Disney's entire value... based on prevailing cash-flow multiples in the industry." Despite it technically being a joint venture, for all intents and purposes, ESPN operates as a division of Disney as a result of the company's controlling interest (as it was with ABC and Capital Cities before it).

In August 2006, ESPN announced that ABC Sports would be fully integrated into ESPN, using the channel's graphics and music for its sports presentations, in addition to handling production responsibilities for the ABC sports telecasts. The last live sporting event televised under the ABC Sports banner was the U.S. Championship Game of the Little League World Series on August 26, 2006 (ABC was slated to carry the Little League World Series Championship Game on August 27, but the game was postponed to August 28 due to rain, and subsequently aired on ESPN2). The changeover took effect the following weekend to coincide with the start of the college football season, with NBA, IndyCar Series and NASCAR coverage eventually following suit.

Despite the rebranding, George Bodenheimer's official title remained "President, ESPN Inc. and ABC Sports" until his retirement at the end of 2011, upon which the "ABC Sports" portion of the title was retired. In addition, ABC itself maintains the copyright over a number of the ESPN-branded broadcasts, if they are not contractually assigned to the applicable league or organizer. ABC-affiliated stations owned by Hearst Television (such as WTAE-TV in Pittsburgh; WCVB-TV in Boston; WMUR-TV in Manchester, New Hampshire; WISN-TV in Milwaukee and KMBC-TV in Kansas City) have the right of first refusal over the local simulcasts of ESPN-televised Monday Night Football games involving teams within their home market, which are rarely waived to other local stations in their market areas. Equally, other Hearst-owned stations affiliated with other networks (such as NBC affiliate WBAL-TV in Baltimore) have been able to air NFL games from ESPN for the same reason.

ESPN has been criticized for decreasing the number of sports broadcasts on ABC, especially during the summer months. One such example is NASCAR: from 2007 to 2009, ABC aired all of the Chase for the NASCAR Sprint Cup races, along with the penultimate race to the chase. From 2010 to 2014, ABC only broadcast three Sprint Cup races with only one Chase race (held in Charlotte, North Carolina) to the outrage of NASCAR fans and sponsors. Several other events such as the Rose Bowl, the Citrus Bowl and The Open Championship, have also been moved from ABC to ESPN. This, however, is not entirely the fault of ESPN, as ABC in general has attracted a primarily female viewership in recent years, with sports largely attracting a male-dominated audience.

ESPN Sports Saturday, an analogy program in the vein of Wide World of Sports, was cancelled after five seasons in August 2015. This was because ABC gave back the Sunday afternoon schedule to its affiliates four months later. Also, with the rise of the Internet and 24/7 mobile applications and streaming services specializing in sports news have eliminated the need for a traditional anthology sports program airing on broadcast television (including ABC) during weekend afternoons. It also eliminated the need for a separate Sunday afternoon block on ABC which had seen a long decline until January 2016. It is now simply a simulcast of the 30 for 30 documentary series sourced from ESPN.

== 2010s-2020s ==
=== The major sporting events return ===
After mainly being a home for the NBA and college football since the ESPN integration in 2006, the major sporting events returned to ABC nine years later.

To increase viewership after a disastrous cable-only Wild Card game, ESPN announced that their one Wild Card game for the 2015-16 playoffs would be simulcast on ABC, bringing the NFL back to ABC for the first time since Super Bowl XL in 2006. ABC's involvement with ESPN's NFL coverage would expand in the next few years, with the return of the Pro Bowl and the last day of the NFL draft in 2018, with the latter eventually expanding to all three days in 2019, to go along with NFL Scouting Combine coverage, regular season game simulcasts in 2020, NFL Training Camp coverage in 2021, and exclusive games beginning in 2022. ESPN also gained rights to a Divisional game, which is also expected to be simulcast on ABC, and two Super Bowls, both exclusively on ABC.

In 2019, after not airing any games since 2008, Major League Soccer announced that the 2019 MLS Cup would air on ABC, after years of being on ESPN and Fox. ABC later returned to airing regular season and select Cup playoff games in 2020. ABC later expanded its soccer range by including international matchups.

2019 also saw the return of college basketball to ABC, for the first time since 2014, with 5 games airing on ABC. ABC's schedule later expanded to as many as 10 regular season games, either men's or women's.

2020 marked the return of pro baseball to ABC. With Major League Baseball expanding their postseason for the COVID-shortened 2020 season, ESPN was given rights to air 7 of the 8 new Wild Card Series, which saw 3 games air on ABC. These were ABC's first MLB games since the 1995 World Series. In 2021, with ESPN's new agreement with MLB, a possible, and eventual, postseason expansion and return of the Wild Card Series would see ABC get some games. On August 8, ABC aired a Sunday Night Baseball game for the first time ever. This marked ABC's first exclusive regular season broadcast since 1989.

After being away from the game since 2004, in 2021, ESPN and the NHL reached a 7-year agreement to bring the NHL back to not only ESPN, but to ABC as well. With ESPN producing at least 100 games a season, ABC will air at least ten games under a brand new ABC Hockey Saturday package. ABC will also air or simulcast select Stanley Cup Playoff games, primarily on weekends, as well as, for the first time since 1980, all 7 games of the Stanley Cup Final, with the latter happening in 4 of the 7 years of ESPN's deal, alternating with TNT.

After airing select tournament games since 2021, in 2023, the NCAA Women's Basketball Championship Game will move to ABC. This will be the first time since 1995 that the Tournament Final will air on broadcast television. To accommodate ABC's primetime lineup, the game will move to an afternoon start, similar to ESPN's Pro Bowl coverage in 2018.

Other events that have made its way to ABC include: F1, the UFC, middle weekend Wimbledon matches, Australian Open highlights, the NCAA Women's Gymnastics Championships, the NCAA Division I softball tournament, the XFL, which previously aired on ABC in 2020, which returned in 2023, and the Premier Lacrosse League.

== See also ==
- History of the American Broadcasting Company
- History of ESPN
- History of NBC Sports
