= Chester (given name) =

Chester is a masculine given name of English origins with Latin roots. It comes from the word "castrum", which means fort or encampment.

== People ==
- Chester A. Arthur (1829–1886), the 21st president of the United States
- Chester Alan Arthur II (1864–1937), son of Chester A. Arthur
- Chester "Gavin" Alan Arthur III (1901–1972), American astrologer and sexologist and a grandson of Chester A. Arthur
- Chester "Chet" Atkins (1924–2001), American musician
- Chester Baker Slawson (1898–1964), Professor of mineralogy
- Chester W. Barrows (1872–1931), Justice of the Rhode Island Supreme Court
- Chester Bennington (1976–2017), the lead vocalist of the rock band Linkin Park
- Chester Brown (born 1960), Canadian alternative cartoonist and, since 2008, the Libertarian Party of Canada's candidate for the riding of Trinity-Spadina in Toronto, Canada
- Ches Buchanan (1907–1964), American baseball pitcher
- Chester Burnett (1910–1976), known as Howlin' Wolf, American blues singer, guitarist and harmonica player
- Chester Carlson (1906–1968), American physicist, inventor, and patent attorney
- Chester C. Chattin (1909–1979), Justice of the Tennessee Supreme Court
- Chester Coco (1915–2001), American politician and lawyer
- Chester Conklin (1886–1971), American comedian and actor
- Chester Conn (1894–1973), American composer of popular music
- Chester B. Clapp (1883–?), American screenwriter
- Chester Crocker (born 1941), American diplomat
- Chester Cruikshank (1913–1970), American athlete
- Chester Dale (1883–1962), American banker, major donor to the National Gallery of Art, Washington DC
- Chester Gillette (1883–1908), American murderer
- Chester Gould (1900–1985), American cartoonist, best known as the creator of the Dick Tracy comic strip
- Chester Himes (1909–1984), American writer, author of If He Hollers Let Him Go
- Chester E. Holifield (1903–1995), United States Representative from California
- Chester Kallman (1921–1975), American writer
- Chester Ludgin (1925–2003), American operatic baritone
- Chester Manifold (1867–1918), Australian politician and philanthropist
- Chester Morris (1901–1970), American actor, who starred in the Boston Blackie detective series of the 1940s
- Chester W. Nimitz (1885–1966), American five-star admiral
- Chester Poage (1980-2000), American murder victim
- Chester Rapkin, American urban planner
- Chester Novell Turner, African-American filmmaker
- Chester See (born 1983), American musician, actor and YouTube personality
- Chester Stiles (September 14, 1970) Filmed himself molesting a three-year-old girl and was sentenced to 21 terms of life in prison with the possibility of parole after 140 years
- Chester Taylor (born 1979), American football running back of the National Football League who is currently on the Arizona Cardinals
- Chester Thompson (born 1948), American drummer and session musician
- Chester Williams (1970–2019), former South African rugby union rugby player
- Chester Sidney Williams (1907–1992), American educator and author who wrote extensively about education and freedoms

== Fictional characters ==
- Chester Cheetah, mascot for cheese-flavored snack brand Cheetos
- Chester Goode in TV series Gunsmoke
- Chester McBadbat in The Fairly OddParents
- Chester the Molester, cartoon character in Hustler magazine
- Chester the Terrier, cartoon character in the Warner Bros. Looney Tunes/Merrie Melodies series
