= Slawson =

Slawson is a surname. Notable people with the surname include:

- Brian Slawson (born 1956), American percussionist
- Chester Baker Slawson (1898–1964), Professor of mineralogy
- Jalen Slawson (born 1999), American basketball player
- Shelby Slawson (born 1960), American attorney, businesswoman, and politician.
- Spike Slawson (born 1970), American musician
- Steve Slawson (born 1972), English footballer
- Wayne Slawson (born 1932), American composer

== See also ==
- Bennington, Indiana, or Slawson, unincorporated community
- Slawson Mountain, is a mountain in Sullivan County, New York.
