= Chees =

Chees may refer to:

- Chees, a dolphin character in the animated TV series Delfy and His Friends
- Chees, a 1973 poetry collection by Pravin Darji
- the plural of Chee (given name)
- the plural of Chee (surname)

== See also ==
- Cheese
- Chess
- Cheez (disambiguation)
