= Major League Baseball on ABC =

MLB baseball broadcast telecasts (2020–present)

- Major League Baseball on ABC logo circa 1989.
- Also known as: ESPN Major League Baseball; Baseball Tonight; Baseball Night in America; Major League Baseball Game of the Week; Monday Night Baseball; Sunday Afternoon Baseball; Sunday Night Baseball; Thursday Night Baseball
- Genre: American baseball game telecasts
- Directed by: Steve Danz; Chet Forte; Ken Fouts; Craig Janoff; Larry Kamm
- Presented by: Various commentators
- Theme music composer: Charles Fox; Robert Israel; Lillian Scheinert; Kurt Bestor; Scott Schreer
- Country of origin: United States
- Original language: English
- No. of seasons: 29 (through 2026 season)

Production
- Executive producers: Roone Arledge; Geoffrey Mason
- Producers: Bob Goodrich; Curt Gowdy Jr.; Chuck Howard; Peter Lasser; Dennis Lewin
- Production locations: Various MLB stadiums (game telecasts)
- Editors: Dean Hovell; Conrad Kraus; Pamela Peterson
- Camera setup: Multi-camera
- Running time: 210 minutes or until game ends (inc. adverts)
- Production companies: Major League Baseball; ABC Sports (1976–1989 and 1994–1995); ESPN (2020–present)

Original release
- Network: ABC
- Release: May 30, 1953 – September 25, 1954
- Release: September 28, 1959 – September 20, 1961
- Release: April 17 – October 2, 1965
- Release: April 12, 1976 – October 29, 1989
- Network: The Baseball Network (ABC)
- Release: July 16, 1994 – October 26, 1995
- Network: ABC; ESPN; ESPN2; ESPN DTC; ESPN Deportes (Spanish audio/broadcast)
- Release: September 29, 2020 – present

Related
- Major League Baseball on ESPN Radio

National television broadcasts of Major League Baseball (MLB) games have aired on ABC in various formats. The network first aired Saturday Major League Baseball Game of the Week games between 1953 and 1954, in 1960 and in 1965. ABC then televised MLB games from 1976 to 1989, airing Monday Night Baseball, Thursday Night Baseball and Sunday Afternoon Baseball in various years during that period.

MLB games aired on ABC again in 1994 and 1995 as part of The Baseball Network, the short-lived time-brokered package of broadcasts produced by Major League Baseball and split with NBC. After not televising MLB since The Baseball Network folded, and after the ABC Sports division merged with ESPN in 2006, ABC has aired selected games as part of its sister cable network's contract since 2020. The broadcasts since 2020 have been produced by ESPN and have primarily used the ESPN Major League Baseball branding and graphics. This includes a Sunday Night Baseball game in 2021 and selected weekend afternoon games in 2026.

== History ==
From 1953 until 1954, and again from 1959 to 1961, ABC aired Major League Baseball Game of the Week telecasts, usually on Saturdays. In 1959, ABC broadcast the best-of-three playoff series (to decide the National League pennant) between the Milwaukee Braves and Los Angeles Dodgers.

In 1965, ABC returned to Game of the Week broadcasting with 28 regional Saturday and Holiday games.

In 1976, ABC began a new four year rights deal with MLB that included 16 new Monday night games, which increased to 18 in the next three years of the deal, as well as half the postseason (both League Championship Series in even numbered years and World Series in odd numbered years) and the All-Star Game in even numbered years. This contract was modified for the 1980 season, Monday Night Baseball telecasts were reduced to just five, with the rest of the games moved to Sunday afternoons.

In 1984, ABC agreed to a new six year rights deal with MLB. The playoff and All-Star Game television structure remained the same, while ABC increased their regular season games to 20.

In 1989, the final season of ABC's deal before CBS took over, ABC moved their games to Thursday nights.

In 1994, ABC returned to MLB coverage with another six year rights deal. Under the deal, as part of The Baseball Network, ABC would air six weeks of regular season games on Saturday and Monday nights. In even numbered years, ABC had the rights to the World Series and Division Series, while in odd numbered years ABC had the rights to the All-Star Game and League Championship Series. However, these plans changed because of the 1994–95 Major League Baseball strike. Because of the strike, which began on August 12, a significant number of games were cancelled, including the 1994 World Series. ABC and NBC consequently, wound up sharing the rights to the 1995 World Series. Also because of the strike, The Baseball Network, a joint production between NBC and ABC, collapsed, and ABC ended their MLB rights following the 1995 season.

In 2020, ABC returned to MLB coverage once again. This time it was part of ESPN's Wild Card Series coverage, which was expanded due to the COVID-19 pandemic (ESPN and ABC are both primarily owned by The Walt Disney Company, and Disney integrated the ABC Sports division with ESPN in 2006). ABC aired three Wild Card Series games as part of this coverage. All coverage primarily used ESPN or ESPN on ABC branding. In 2021, ABC aired their first regular season game since 1995, an August 8 Sunday Night Baseball game between the Chicago White Sox and Chicago Cubs. That same year, ESPN and Major League Baseball agreed to a contract extension that included the exclusive rights to a new Wild Card Series. ABC will have the rights to air select games from the Series, as well as the rights to air select ESPN regular season games. From 2022 to 2025, ABC has aired one to three games (usually all games from one of the series) annually from the Wild Card Series. On February 20, 2025, MLB and ESPN agreed to opt-out of their deal at the end of the 2025 season.

On November 19, 2025, ESPN announced a restructured three-year deal with MLB. Among its new rights, ESPN would televise a 30-game schedule primarily on summer weeknights, including the MLB Little League Classic, Memorial Day games, and the second-half opener game. However, its flagship broadcast Sunday Night Baseball and the Wild Card Series were moved to NBC, while Netflix took over the rights to the Home Run Derby.

On January 21, 2026, ESPN announced that ABC would exclusively air three regular season during the 2026 season. The games will take place during weekend afternoons in June and August. The games mark the most regular season games to air on ABC since 1995.

=== List of games since 2020 ===
| Year | Date | Teams | Play-by-play | Color commentator(s) | Field reporter(s) | Significance | Viewership (millions) |
|---|---|---|---|---|---|---|---|
| 2020 | September 29 | Astros-Twins | Karl Ravech | Tim Kurkjian and Eduardo Pérez | | Game 1 of the AL Wild Card Series | 2.20 |
| 2020 | September 30 | Marlins-Cubs | Jon Sciambi | Chipper Jones | Jesse Rogers | Game 1 of the NL Wild Card Series | 1.54 |
| 2020 | October 2^{α} | Marlins-Cubs | Jon Sciambi | Chipper Jones | Jesse Rogers | Game 2 of the NL Wild Card series | 2.19 |
| 2021 | August 8 | White Sox-Cubs^{β} | Matt Vasgersian | Alex Rodriguez | Buster Olney | First regular season game since last aired in 1995 | 1.63 |
| 2022 | October 7 | Phillies-Cardinals | Michael Kay | Alex Rodriguez | Alden Gonzalez | Game 1 of the NL Wild Card Series | 3.12 |
| 2023 | October 3 | Rangers-Rays | Sean McDonough | Jessica Mendoza and Tim Kurkjian | Coley Harvey | Game 1 of the AL Wild Card Series | 2.21 |
| 2023 | October 4 | Rangers-Rays | Sean McDonough | Jessica Mendoza and Tim Kurkjian | Coley Harvey | Game 2 of the AL Wild Card Series | 2.24 |
| 2024 | October 1 | Tigers-Astros | Michael Kay | Todd Frazier and Tim Kurkjian | Alden González | Game 1 of the AL Wild Card Series | 3.19 |
| 2024 | October 2 | Tigers-Astros | Michael Kay | Todd Frazier and Tim Kurkjian | Alden González | Game 2 of the AL Wild Card Series | 3.01 |
| 2025 | September 30 | Padres-Cubs | Kevin Brown | Jessica Mendoza and Ben McDonald | Jesse Rogers | Game 1 of the NL Wild Card Series | |
| 2025 | October 1 | Padres-Cubs | Kevin Brown | Jessica Mendoza and Ben McDonald | Jesse Rogers | Game 2 of the NL Wild Card Series | |
| 2025 | October 2 | Tigers-Guardians | Sean McDonough | Todd Frazier | Taylor McGregor | Game 3 of the AL Wild Card Series | |
| 2026 | June 14 | Cubs-Giants | Jon Sciambi | David Ross | Buster Olney | First regular season games on the network since last aired in 2021 | |
| 2026 | June 27 | Yankees-Red Sox | Karl Ravech | David Ross and Eduardo Perez | Buster Olney | First regular season games on the network since last aired in 2021 | |
| 2026 | August 16 | Cardinals-Cubs | Jon Sciambi | David Ross and Eduardo Perez | Buster Olney | First regular season games on the network since last aired in 2021 | |

=== Notes ===
^α ABC cut away from their broadcast Miami-Chicago Cubs game during the top of the 9th inning to deliver a special report on U.S. president Donald Trump being taken to Walter Reed National Military Medical Center for COVID-19 treatment. The conclusion of the game would be seen on ESPN.
^β Al Michaels, who was the lead play-by-play announcer for ABC's Major League Baseball coverage from 1983 to 1989 and their brief return to the sport from 1994 to 1995, would join in on the broadcast via FaceTime during the fourth inning. Vasgersian, Rodriguez, and Olney wore special ABC Sports patches during the Sunday Night Baseball telecast on August 8, 2021. Special graphics were also used in conjunction with the standard ESPN MLB graphics.

== Production overview ==
In 1965, ABC brought forth such innovations like isolated instant replay, field microphones, and a separate camera for each base runner. After ABC's contract for the Game of the Week expired after a single season, NBC felt compelled to dramatically alter their own baseball coverage. So for NBC's coverage of the 1965 World Series, it featured videotaped replays, prerecorded audio analysis from key players, and enhanced animated graphics.

When ABC resumed broadcasting Major League Baseball games in 1976 after an eleven-year hiatus, they were immediately accused of having ill-prepared production crews and announcers on their Monday Night Baseball telecasts. William Leggett of Sports Illustrated would in particular, note that ABC seemed to try to hoodwink viewers with commentary that may sound insightful, but was often dead wrong, and with fancy camera work that was frequently used at inappropriate times during the action. Leggett also criticized ABC for far too often losing batted balls and base runners from view and employing split screens with the wrong men on base. Not only that, but the starting lineups were not being given at the beginning of the games.

According to James Walker, professor in the department of communication at Saint Xavier University and co-author of the book Center Field Shot: A History of Baseball on Television, ABC brought the techniques it had perfected in its football coverage, including far more extensive use of replays, isolated cameras, and different angles. In contrast, when looking at NBC's production of the 1969 World Series, very few replays were utilized and it was a much more static broadcast than what you saw later.

For their coverage of the 1979 World Series in Baltimore, ABC brought two trucks (and rented a third), 14 cameras, a helicopter and nearly 100 technicians. According to producer Chuck Howard, that was just about twice the number of cameras used during the regular season, and at twice the cost. Director Chet Forte's team of cameramen was, in his words, "built around the camera position high behind home plate (C-2)." Their "coverage camera" was designed to follow the flight of the ball. ABC intended on using this camera 75 percent of the time and was according to Forte, the toughest camera in TV sports.

=== 1980s ===
ABC, under the watch of director Joe Aceti, brought some innovations in time for their coverage of the 1980 National League Championship Series between the Houston Astros and Philadelphia Phillies, such as putting the camera in the gondola in the Astrodome looking straight down on the field. For tight shots, Aceti wanted to see the face of the pitcher and the face of the batter. He didn't want them shown in a split screen but separately in a close-up. He also didn't want to shot players head to toe in a long shot, not even in a medium shot.

Chet Forte's directing performance would come under scrutiny when ABC next broadcast the World Series in 1981. For one thing, ABC's replay cameras, which were placed strategically around the park, don't always catch the play. For example, ABC only showed one replay from the main feed camera of New York Yankees third baseman Graig Nettles making a diving, eighth-inning catch of Los Angeles Dodgers first baseman Steve Garvey's liner in Game 1. ABC was also criticized for frequently showing all those players' wives cheering instead of giving viewers a wide- angle view of how the outfielders are playing the hitters.

David Remnick of the Washington Post felt that Howard Cosell while broadcasting the 1983 World Series alongside Al Michaels and Earl Weaver, developed a few "human interest" tags and rammed them home in his inimitable ecclesiastical rhythms instead of actually sharing his knowledge with viewers. To put things into perspective, Remnick noted that Cosell had more to say about the way the Baltimore groundskeepers combated the outfield's "slippage factor" with a miraculous "drying agent" than about Mike Boddicker's pitching. Remnick also said that Cosell had more to say about the refurbished buildings in downtown Baltimore and along the Schuylkill River than about Mike Schmidt's hitting. Or Cosell would talk about John Denny's family problems more often than his ability to strike out Eddie Murray. Remnick in particular, criticized ABC for featuring interviews interspersed with the game action, which would sometimes cause them to miss a double off the wall while a prerecorded player is gabbing up in the corner of the screen. Not only that, but Remnick accused Howard Cosell of did his best to ruin a great camera shot of John Lowenstein's theft of a home run in Game 1 by simultaneously praising the shot and rapping other networks for praising their own shots.

Game 6 of the 1985 World Series would become rooted in controversy when the bottom of the ninth, Jorge Orta, the leadoff batter for the Kansas City Royals, hit a slow roller to St. Louis Cardinals first baseman Jack Clark, who tossed the ball to the pitcher, Todd Worrell, who was covering first base. Umpire Don Denkinger called Orta safe, even though television replays and photographs clearly showed that he was out by half a step. The Royals went on to win Game 6 by the score of 2–1. The first replay that ABC showed was a faraway shot from high along the third base side that froze upon Worrell's catch, with Orta's foot still seemingly in the air.

NBC Sports executive producer Michael Weisman said that while he thought that ABC's coverage of the 1986 League Championship Series was overall fine, he didn't think that they held on with the stories long enough. For instance, Weisman thought that ABC should have kept a camera on California Angels third-base coach Moose Stubing longer in Game 2 of the American League Championship Series. Weisman thought that the camera should've followed Stubing into the dugout to see how his teammates reacted to him after he failed to give Bobby Grich a sign. Weisman also felt that ABC should have stayed with New York Mets first baseman Keith Hernandez longer after he was called out on strikes in Game 1 of the National League Championship Series against the Houston Astros and argued vehemently with umpire Doug Harvey.

Meanwhile, Harry Coyle, NBC's coordinating producer and director of baseball also said that while he thought that ABC's 1986 LCS coverage was for the most part fine, he also said "A shot of a wife can be a great shot, if you use it once or twice a game, like in the ninth inning of a close game and the pitcher is in trouble. But to show a batter, then his wife, then the batter, then his wife, then the batter, then his wife . . . well, that's ridiculous." When asked about ABC's use of a roof camera at the Astrodome, Coyle said "If that shot is so great, why don't they sell seats up there."

In June 1987, ABC director Craig Janoff said that they didn't do quite the same thing as NBC since they would go two months without doing a game that season, and then they would do the World Series in October. Janoff added that baseball was the most challenging sport that he has directed for television because timing is critical. In other words, you have to think about where a fan's eyes move, and constant cutting from camera to camera is necessary.

Come the World Series in 1987, Norman Chad of the Washington Post said that ABC's cameras miss nothing and offered unmatched replays. Meanwhile, ABC's graphics in Chad's eyes, provided better reading than some best sellers, while the announcers knew the game and talked intelligently about it. Furthermore, Chad said that ABC's cameras always showed runs as they were scored. In contrast, NBC sometimes failed to show players crossing the plate during their coverage of the League Championship Series. And whereas ABC's announcers almost always pulled back when the Metrodome crowd went into a frenzy in Minnesota, NBC's announcers according to Chad, sometimes added to the noise (except to go silent at game's end). Chad even believed that ABC captured the quirky nature of the Metrodome better than NBC, from intriguing camera shots to Al Michaels' play-by-play.

When assessing ABC's coverage of the 1988 NLCS between the Los Angeles Dodgers and New York Mets, the Chicago Tribune's Steve Nidetz praised their camera work. Nidetz in particular, gave credit to producer Curt Gowdy Jr., who was responsible for calling all the shots for ABC's NLCS coverage. Instead of subjecting viewers to long-range angles of baseballs floating into the air, ABC had closeups everywhere, from the dugout to the field to the stands. In contrast, ABC's production of the 1988 ALCS between the Oakland Athletics and Boston Red Sox under director Steve Danz, cameramen kept missing plays and according to Jim Sarni of the South Florida Sun-Sentinel, seemed to be preoccupied showing the Harvard rowing crew on the Charles.

Again as previously mentioned, Game 3 of 1989 World Series was scheduled to begin at San Francisco's Candlestick Park on October 17 at 5:35 PDT, ABC began its pre-game show at 5:00 PDT. When the Loma Prieta earthquake struck at approximately 5:04 PDT, Tim McCarver was narrating taped highlights of Game 2, which had been played two days prior across the Bay Bridge in Oakland. Television viewers saw the video signal begin to break up, heard McCarver repeat a sentence as the shaking distracted him, and heard Al Michaels exclaim, "I'll tell you what, we're having an earth – ." At that moment, the signal from Candlestick Park was lost. The network put up a green ABC Sports "World Series" technical difficulties telop graphic while it scrambled to repair the video feed (the broadcast cameras and mics were powered by the local power supply), but audio from the stadium was restored after a few seconds via a telephone link:

Al Michaels: Well, heh, I don't know if we're on the air... We are in commercial, I guess.

Jim Palmer: Yes, yes, we hear you.

Tim McCarver: I guess...

Michaels: I don't hear a thing.

McCarver: I guess Dave Parker...

Michaels: Well, heh, I don't know if we're on the air or not, and I'm not sure I care at this particular moment but we are. Well, folks, that's the greatest open in the history of television! Bar none!

McCarver: Started with a bang!

Michaels: Yes, it certainly did! Heh! We're still here! Heh! We are still, as we can tell, on the air, and I guess you are hearing us, even though we have no picture and no return audio, and we will be back, we hope, from San Francisco, in just a moment.

The combined screams of excitement and panic from fans who had no idea of the devastation elsewhere could be heard in the background. ABC then switched to episodes of Roseanne and The Wonder Years, which was on standby for a rain delay situation, while attempting to restore electricity to its remote equipment. With anchorman Ted Koppel in position in Washington, D.C., ABC News began continuous coverage of the quake at 5:32 p.m. PDT, with Al Michaels, in the process, becoming a de facto on-site reporter for ABC. The Goodyear Blimp had already been overhead to cover the baseball game, and ABC used it to capture images of damage to the Bay Bridge and other locations.

=== 1995 ===
Jerry Trecker of the Hartford Courant praise ABC's production of the 1995 All-Star Game in Arlington. He said that the broadcast crew of Al Michaels, Tim McCarver, and Jim Palmer paced their broadcast as if they had never been away, and the different looks, especially ground level cameras, had always been a trademark of effective work by ABC. ABC also according to him, made effective use of graphics to recap season leaders. ABC Sports' technical coverage as a whole, included 21 cameras from all vantage points, including one in the Goodyear Blimp, and an unmanned camera directly above home plate. Coaches would wear wireless microphones.

Trecker did, however, point out that times, the broadcasters seemed to be ahead of the production people, especially when they wanted to talk about Raul Mondesi's speed getting to a drive into the right field corner. They never showed it. Trecker also believed that ABC's usage of dugout reporters (in this case, Lesley Visser, John Saunders, and Rick Dempsey), even in showcase games like the All-Star Game, was overkill. Visser in particular, was singled out for asked such lengthy questions of Los Angeles Dodgers pitcher Hideo Nomo that it was almost farcical when his answers came back in translation.

For the 1995 World Series, ABC and NBC shared 17 cameras and 13 tape machines, two of the "Super Slo-Mo" variety.

== Major League Baseball coverage on ABC's owned-and-operated television stations ==
| Team | Stations | Years |
|---|---|---|
| Brooklyn Dodgers | WABC-TV 7 | August 17, 1953–October 1, 1953 |
| Chicago Cubs | WLS-TV 7 | 2015–2019 |
| Houston Astros | KTRK-TV 13 | 1962–1972 |
| Philadelphia Athletics | WFIL-TV 6 (later WPVI) | 1949–1954 |
| Philadelphia Phillies | WFIL-TV 6 (later WPVI) | 1959–1970 |

Historically, KTRK was the original television home of the Houston Astros, from the team's inaugural season in 1962 until 1971; however, the station only aired the team's Sunday afternoon road games. It also broadcast any Astros games that were part of ABC's broadcast contract with Major League Baseball from 1976 to 1989.

On December 12, 2014, WLS-TV signed a new five-year broadcast agreement with the Chicago Cubs, in which WLS would televise 25 of the Major League Baseball team's games per year, starting with the 2015 season. The arrangement partially replaced one with WGN-TV (which had broadcast Cubs games since its inception in April 1948), which voluntarily pulled out of its existing broadcast deal with the team for the 2015 season and subsequently agreed to carry a reduced slate of 45 games. The WLS broadcasts were seen on DirecTV's version of MLB Extra Innings, and the feed provided is the WLS signal seen in the Chicago market (unlike with the feeds of WGN broadcasts, where public service announcements were seen in place of local commercials and station promos). As ABC had a limited sports programming schedule during the Major League Baseball season prior to September (when the MLB regular season and college football season overlap), the station mainly carried the team's weekend daytime games in order to limit pre-emptions of the network's prime time programming.

== Announcers ==
Records
| Preceded by NBC | Major League Baseball network broadcast partner 1948–1989 with NBC (1948–1950, 1953–1954, 1959–1961, 1965 and 1976–1989) | Succeeded by CBS |
| Preceded by CBS | Major League Baseball network broadcast partner 1994–1995 with NBC | Succeeded by Fox and NBC |
| Preceded by None | Major League Baseball network broadcast partner 2020–present under ESPN with Fox (2020–present) with NBC (2026–present) | Succeeded by Incumbent |
