= Chee =

Chee may refer to:

== People ==
- Chee (given name), a unisex given name
- Chee (surname), a surname

== Other uses ==
- 22158 Chee, a main-belt asteroid
- Chée, a river in northeastern France
- Chee, a race of androids in the Animorphs novel series

== See also ==
- Chi (disambiguation)
- Qi (disambiguation)
- Chee-Chee (disambiguation)
