= Chet =

Chet is a male given name, often a nickname for Chester, which means fortress or camp. It is an uncommon name of English origin, and originated as a surname to identify people from the city of Chester, England. Chet was ranked 1,027th in popularity for males of all ages in a sample of the 1990 US Census.

People named Chet include:

- Chet (murza) (fl. 14th century), murza of the Golden Horde and legendary progenitor of several Russian families
- Chet Allen (1939–1984), American child opera and choir performer
- Chester "Chet" Atkins (1924–2001), American country guitarist and record producer
- Chesney "Chet" Baker (1929–1988), American jazz musician and vocalist
- Chet Bitterman (1952–1981), American linguist and Christian missionary
- Chet Brooks (1966–2026), American National Football League player
- Chester Chet Bulger (1917–2009), American National Football League player
- Chester Chet Culver (born 1966), former Governor of Iowa
- Thomas Chester Chet Edwards (born 1951), American politician
- Chet Faker (born 1988), Australian singer and songwriter
- Fulvio Chester Chet Forte (1935–1996), American sports television director and basketball player
- Chester Chet Gardner (1898–1939), American race car driver
- Chester Chet Gladchuk (1917–1967), National Football League and Canadian Football League player
- Donald Chester Chet Grant (1892–1985), American basketball and football player, football and All-American Girls Professional Baseball League coach and sports editor
- Chester Marlon Chet Hanks (born 1990), American actor and musician, son of Tom Hanks
- Chet Hanulak (1933–2021), American former National Football League player
- Chester E. Holifield (1903–1995), American politician
- Chet Holmgren (born 2002), American basketball player
- Chester Chet Huntley (1911–1974), American television newscaster
- Chester Chet Jastremski (1941–2014), American swimmer
- Chester Chet Jaworski (1916–2003), American college basketball player
- Chester Chet Lemon (born 1955), American retired Major League Baseball player
- Chet Miksza (1930–1975), Canadian Football League player
- Chet Moeller (born 1953), American college football player
- Chester Chet Mutryn (1921–1995), All-America Football Conference and the National Football League player
- Chester Chet Nichols Sr. (1897–1982), Major League Baseball pitcher
- Chester Chet Nichols Jr. (1931–1995), Major League Baseball pitcher, son of the above
- Chester Chet Ostrowski (1930–2001), American National Football League player
- Chet Raymo (born 1936), American writer, educator and naturalist
- Chester Chet Walker (1940–2024), American National Basketball Association player
- Chester Chet A. Wynne (1898–1967), American football player and college head coach
