= Sunday Afternoon Baseball =

Branding for MLB games held on Sunday afternoons

- The logo for MLB Sunday leadoff on Peacock since 2026
- Also known as: MLB Sunday Leadoff
- Genre: Sport
- Developed by: CBS Sports; NBC Sports; ABC Sports and ESPN; TBS; Major League Baseball
- Directed by: Chet Forte; Craig Janoff
- Presented by: Various commentators
- Starring: Al Michaels; Jim Palmer; Tim McCarver; Keith Jackson; Howard Cosell; Don Drysdale; Jim Lampley; Bob Uecker; Johnny Bench
- Theme music composer: Lillian Scheinert; Robert Israel
- Country of origin: United States
- Original language: English

Production
- Executive producer: Roone Arledge
- Producers: Dennis Lewin; Curt Gowdy Jr.
- Camera setup: Multi-camera
- Running time: 210 minutes or until game ends (inc. adverts)

Original release
- Network: CBS; NBC; ABC; TBS; The Roku Channel
- Release: October 10, 1977 – present

Related
- Major League Baseball on CBS; Major League Baseball on NBC; Major League Baseball Game of the Week; Major League Baseball on TBS

Sunday Afternoon Baseball is the de facto title used for nationally televised live game telecasts of Major League Baseball games on Sunday afternoons during the regular season. Games have aired in various incarnations on various networks since 1977.

== History ==
=== Early versions (1958–1964) ===
The first Sunday afternoon broadcasts of Major League Baseball occurred in 1958 when CBS added a Sunday Game of the Week. Two years later, NBC launched their own Sunday telecasts to go with their Saturday afternoon Game of the Week broadcasts.

In 1962, CBS dropped the Sunday baseball Game of the Week once the NFL season started, dropping the option clause for affiliates to carry baseball or football in place since 1957. NBC's Sunday afternoon telecasts would last through the end of the 1964 season.

=== ABC's Sunday afternoon coverage (1977–1987) ===
Logo for ABC's Sunday afternoon telecasts from 1987.

In 1979, the start of ABC's Monday Night Baseball coverage was moved back to June, due to poor ratings during the May sweeps period. In place of April and May prime time games, ABC began airing Sunday Afternoon Baseball games in September. ABC also had a clause where they could air a game the last day of the regular season if it had playoff implications, such as in 1987 in regards to the Detroit Tigers' American League East pennant chase against the Toronto Blue Jays. The team of Michaels, Palmer, and McCarver called that game in Detroit that day, in which the Tigers clinched the American League East crown. However, in 1986, ABC did do a number of early season Sunday afternoon games before they went into Monday Night Baseball. ABC's contract was further modified prior to the 1980 season, with the network airing just five Monday Night Baseball telecasts in June of that year, followed by Sunday Afternoon Baseball in August and September. ABC did Sunday afternoon games late in the season in order to fulfill the number of games in the contract and to not interfere with Monday Night Football.

In 1981, ABC planned to increase coverage to 10 Monday night games and eight Sunday afternoon games, but the players' strike that year ended up reducing the network's schedule to three Monday night and seven Sunday afternoon telecasts.

On April 7, 1983, Major League Baseball, ABC, and NBC agreed to terms of a six-year television package worth $1.2 billion. The two networks continued to alternate coverage of the League Championship Series (ABC in even numbered years and NBC in odd numbered years), World Series (ABC televised the World Series in odd numbered years and NBC in even numbered years), and All-Star Game (ABC televised the All-Star Game in even numbered years and NBC in odd numbered years) through the 1989 season, with each of the 26 clubs receiving $7 million per year in return. The last package gave each club $1.9 million per year. ABC contributed $575 million for regular season prime time and Sunday afternoons and NBC paid $550 million for thirty Saturday afternoon games. ABC was contracted to televise 20 prime time regular season games a year in addition to other games (the aforementioned Sunday afternoon games).

During the 1986 season, Don Drysdale did play-by-play ABC's Sunday afternoon games, which aired until July, when Monday Night Baseball began. Al Michaels did the main Sunday game usually with Jim Palmer, while Drysdale and Johnny Bench did the backup contests. No Sunday afternoon baseball games were telecast nationally in 1988 and 1989.

=== Sunday afternoon games on CBS (1990–1991) ===
CBS initially did not want to start their 1990 coverage until after the network had aired that year's NBA Finals (which was the last time CBS aired the Finals before the NBA's move to NBC). Therefore, only 12 regular season telecasts were scheduled. The broadcasts would have been each Saturday from June 16 through August 25 and a special Sunday telecast on the weekend of August 11–12 (the New York Yankees against the Oakland Athletics in Oakland on both days). Ultimately, four more telecasts were added – two in April and two on the last two Saturdays of the season.

On Sunday, May 5, 1991, CBS broadcast games involving Cleveland at Oakland (with Jack Buck and Tim McCarver on the call) and Boston at the Chicago White Sox (with Dick Stockton and Jim Kaat on the call). And then on Sunday, July 14 of that year, Dick Stockton and Jim Kaat called a game in Anaheim between the New York Yankees and California Angels.

=== TBS's national package (2008–2021) ===
Beginning with the 2008 season, TBS broadcast a weekly game nationally on Sunday afternoons, under the title Sunday MLB on TBS. These games were not exclusive to TBS and were blacked out in local markets, to protect the stations that hold the local broadcast rights to the games. In the affected areas, simulcasts of programming from sister network HLN aired in place of the games, but recently, a message stating that the game was unavailable due to contractual requirements was aired until the game ended. Pre and postgame coverage remained available. Under the deal, TBS could show an alternate game in those markets, but the network elected not to do so.

Despite initial reports that TBS would carry games on Memorial Day, Independence Day and Labor Day, these holiday games were not part of the contract. For many years, games on these holidays were shown on ESPN, but that network discontinued them, with the occasional exception of when those holidays fell on ESPN's regular broadcast slots.

TBS released a partial schedule of its inaugural slate of Sunday games on February 27, 2008. More games would be added as the season progressed, generally two weeks before each telecast date. TBS had the second pick of game after ESPN.

Consequently, due to its non-exclusivity, highlights of a scheduled game that aired on MLB on TBS were not shown on the ESPN baseball highlight show Baseball Tonight, nor are live simulcasts and highlights of the said game on the MLB.TV subscription service; instead local broadcasts of the scheduled game were shown. However, highlights of an MLB on TBS game did air on the MLB on Fox weekly program This Week in Baseball (until it was canceled in 2011), as well as MLB Tonight on the MLB Network.

On September 24, 2020, it was announced that WarnerMedia had renewed its rights through 2028 (aligned with the conclusion of Fox's most recent extension). A major change in the contract is the replacement of TBS's late-season Sunday games with a new, primetime game on Tuesday nights throughout the regular season.

=== MLB Sunday Leadoff on Peacock/NBC (2022–2023 and 2026–present) ===
In March 2022, it was reported by The Wall Street Journal that NBC Sports was finalizing an agreement to establish a new package of Sunday afternoon games beginning in the 2022 MLB season. The 18-game package will air exclusively on the premium tier of Peacock, with the broadcasts produced by NBC Sports. It was reported that one game of the package each season would be simulcast on the NBC broadcast network, which will mark its first two national MLB broadcasts since 2000. NBC formally announced the deal on April 6, and that the inaugural broadcast would be a game between the Chicago White Sox and Boston Red Sox at Fenway Park on May 8. NBC branded these games as MLB Sunday Leadoff.

=== MLB Sunday Leadoff on Roku (2024–2025) ===
On May 13, 2024, Major League Baseball announced the package would move to The Roku Channel for the 2024 season. Games will also be available blackout free to MLB.tv customers.

=== Expanded over-the-air games on NBC and ABC (2026–present) ===
Following the 2025 season, ESPN opted-out of its media rights agreement with Major League Baseball. As a result, MLB reached a restructured agreement with ESPN and a new agreement with NBC Sports. NBC Sports re-gained the rights to MLB Sunday Leadoff through this agreement, with games primarily airing on NBCSN and Peacock, along with the full rights to Sunday Night Baseball. In order to work around its Sunday Night Football agreement, Sunday games during the 2026 season from August 23 to September 6 will air in the afternoon on NBC. Through ESPN's new agreement, ABC will also air two Sunday afternoon regular season games in 2026, one in June and one in August.

== See also ==
- Major League Baseball on television
- Sunday Night Baseball
