= Slawson Mountain =

Mountain in New York, United States

- Location within New York Adirondack Park Location within the United States

Highest point
- Elevation: 2,493 feet (760 m)
- Coordinates: 41°54′53″N 74°39′31″W

Geography
- Location: E of Willowemoc, New York, U.S.
- Topo map: USGS Willowemoc

Slawson Mountain is a mountain in Sullivan County, New York. It is located east of Willowemoc. Blue Hill is located east and Beech Mountain is located northwest of Slawson Mountain.
