= History of NBC Sports =

Broadcast history of television network

NBC Sports is the sports division of the NBC television network. Formerly "a service of NBC News" (it was spun off as a standalone operating unit by 1977), it broadcasts a diverse array of programs, including the Olympic Games, the NFL, Notre Dame football, the PGA Tour, the Triple Crown, and the French Open, among others. Assets currently include among others Golf Channel and NBC Sports Regional Networks.

== Early years ==
NBC Sports' history can be traced back to May 17, 1939, when experimental television station W2XBS in New York City (which would eventually become WNBC-TV) televised an intercollegiate baseball game between Columbia and Princeton. That year, W2XBS would also televise a boxing match between former heavyweight champion Max Baer and Lou Nova at Madison Square Garden, a doubleheader between the Cincinnati Reds and Brooklyn Dodgers from Ebbets Field, and a professional football game between the Philadelphia Eagles and the Brooklyn Dodgers of the National Football League. All were firsts for the respective sports.

After the end of World War II, sporting events were staples of the nascent NBC television network. NBC televised the Army–Navy Game in 1945, hailed by sports writers at the time as "The Game of the Century." In 1946, the Cavalcade of Sports, a primetime sports anthology program known mainly for its boxing matches, debuted on the network. NBC would televise boxing, usually on Friday nights, until it cancelled the program in 1960. In 1947, NBC televised games one and five of the World Series in the New York metropolitan area (CBS televised games three and four, while the DuMont Television Network televised games two, six and sevem).

== 1950s ==
Beginning in 1950, NBC Sports became the exclusive broadcaster of the World Series, a status that would last for 26 consecutive years. In 1957, NBC began televising the Game of the Week. Except for the 1965 season, NBC would televise Saturday afternoon games for the next three decades. NBC expanded its sports lineup to include the NBA, college and professional football, as well as championship events. In 1952, NBC became the broadcast home of the Rose Bowl; a relationship that lasted for 37 years until 1988. For 1954, NBC signed a one-year agreement to carry the Big Four of Canadian football on Saturday afternoons.

In 1955, NBC paid $100,000 to air the NFL Championship. An employee of NBC played a small part in "The Greatest Game Ever Played." During overtime of the 1958 NFL Championship, NBC lost its feed from Yankee Stadium. A technician ran onto the field and stopped play long enough for the feed to be restored. The game was a watershed moment in the history of the NFL, establishing professional football as a nationally popular television property and beginning the upward surge of the league's popularity.

== 1960s ==
CBS would take over the exclusive broadcast rights to the NFL, including the Championship Game, in 1964. The following year, NBC obtained the broadcast rights to the upstart American Football League. In 1966, the two leagues agreed to merge. As part of the merger, the two leagues' champions would play a World Championship Game, eventually renamed the Super Bowl. Rather than award the broadcast rights of the game to either CBS or NBC, NFL commissioner Pete Rozelle decided to have both networks televise it. NBC commentators Curt Gowdy and Paul Christman called the game, while CBS produced the telecast that aired on both networks. In subsequent years, the Super Bowl would alternate between NBC and CBS (with each network airing the game exclusively to them). After the merger was completed in 1970, NBC would broadcast games from the American Football Conference, composed of the former AFL teams as well as three teams from the old NFL.

== 1970s ==
NBC Sports Logo used from 1976 to 1979

In 1971, at the behest of commissioner Bowie Kuhn, NBC televised Game 4 of the World Series in prime time. It was the first time that a Series game had been played at night, the game attracted an audience of 61 million people. Starting the next season, all Series games held on a weekday would be played at or after 8:00 p.m. Eastern Time; NBC would also begin broadcasting regular-season games on Monday nights during the summer, when reruns of other shows would otherwise be broadcast. On April 8, 1974, NBC televised a game between the Los Angeles Dodgers and the Atlanta Braves in which Hank Aaron of the Braves hit his 715th career home run, breaking the career mark previously held by Babe Ruth.

In 1972, NBC became the broadcast home of the National Hockey League (NBC previously televised the 1966 Stanley Cup Playoffs, which marked the first time that hockey games were televised in color). Among the innovations introduced by NBC was Peter Puck, an animated character in the form of a hockey puck, who explained the rules of hockey to television viewers unfamiliar with the sport. In addition, NBC requested that players wear names on the backs of their jerseys for the NBC Hockey Game of the Week. Nameplates would become universal in the NHL during the mid-1970s.

Beginning in 1969, NBC televised college basketball, including the NCAA Tournament. In 1979, NBC televised the NCAA Championship that pitted future NBA rivals Larry Bird and Magic Johnson. Johnson's Michigan State Spartans defeated Bird's Indiana State Sycamores, 75–64. The game earned a 24.1 rating, the highest ever for a college basketball game.

== 1980s ==
By this time, NBC was mired in third place in the ratings, however sports remained a valuable television commodity for NBC. In addition to the typically massive audience that watched the Super Bowl, NBC's broadcasts of the 1978 and 1980 World Series each earned a 32.8 rating, with the former being watched by an average of 44 million people and the latter by 42 million. This powerful sports lineup, coupled with a resurgent prime time schedule featuring hit shows like The Cosby Show and Cheers, would put NBC back on top of the ratings by the middle of the decade. In December 1988, CBS obtained the exclusive broadcast rights to Major League Baseball, outbidding NBC and ABC and ending NBC's tenure as the home of baseball after 43 years.

In 1985, NBC announced that it had acquired the broadcasting rights of the Summer Olympic Games from ABC beginning with the 1988 event.

In 1989, former ABC Sports and Saturday Night Live producer Dick Ebersol became president of NBC Sports. Ebersol's early tenure at NBC Sports was highlighted by a string of sports-property acquisitions and renewals, including the Olympic Games, NFL, NBA and Notre Dame football.

== 1990s ==
After CBS had wrestled baseball from NBC, NBC obtained the broadcast rights of the National Basketball Association (NBA) in a four-year, $600 million deal. The 1990s would be an era of unprecedented popularity for the NBA, spearheaded by the Chicago Bulls dynasty of Michael Jordan. In 1991, NBC obtained the rights to Notre Dame home games in a $38 million deal, the first time an individual college football team had its own broadcast agreement.

In 1994, after a four-year hiatus, Major League Baseball returned to NBC as part of a new joint venture with ABC called "The Baseball Network", a broadcasting arrangement in which the league produced its own telecasts and split advertising revenue with NBC and ABC. The two networks would televise regional games on Friday and Saturday nights, and would alternate coverage of the All-Star Game, the newly created Division Series, League Championship Series and World Series. The 1994 Major League Baseball strike disrupted the plan, which proved unpopular with fans, and it was abandoned after the 1995 season when Fox announced plans to begin airing MLB programming. NBC would continue broadcasting baseball, albeit on a reduced basis, until the end of the 2000 postseason. It was during this period, with the broadcast rights of the NFL, NBA, Major League Baseball, and the Olympics, that NBC adopted the mantle of "America’s Sports Leader."

During the 1995-96 television season, for the only time in history, the World Series, Super Bowl, NBA Finals and Summer Olympics were telecast by the same network. It was following this run in 1996 that The Sporting News named Ebersol the "Most Powerful Person in Sports". In 1998, CBS would take over the AFC rights from NBC, ending NBC's 38-year tenure with the NFL. CBS had previously lost the National Football Conference (NFC) rights to upstart network Fox, and was by that point struggling in the ratings.

== 2000s ==
In 2000, NBC declined to renew its broadcast agreement with Major League Baseball. In 2002, it was additionally outbid by ESPN and ABC for the NBA's new broadcast contract, ending the league's twelve-year run on NBC.

Former logo for NBC Sports, used from 1989 to 2011.

During this era, NBC experimented with broadcasting emerging sports. In 2001, NBC partnered with the World Wrestling Federation (WWF) to establish the XFL – a new football league which introduced modified rules and debuted to tremendous, but short-lived fanfare, only lasting one season (NBC shared broadcast rights to the league's games, which were mainly held on Saturday nights, with UPN). In 2003, NBC obtained the broadcast rights and a minority interest in the Arena Football League. NBC televised weekly games on a regional basis, as well as the entire playoffs. The deal lasted four years, after which the league and NBC parted ways.

Beginning with the 1999 Pennzoil 400, NBC began its foray into NASCAR. NBC, along with Fox, FX and TNT, obtained the broadcast rights of the top two series – the Winston Cup and Busch Series – in a six-year deal, beginning in 2001. NBC televised the second half of the season and alternated coverage of the Daytona 500 with Fox. In December 2005, NBC announced that it would not renew its agreement with NASCAR. In 2001, NBC obtained the broadcast rights to horse racing's Triple Crown in a five-year deal.

In 2004, NBC reached a broadcast agreement with the National Hockey League (NHL). The revenue-sharing deal called for the two sides to split advertising revenue after NBC recouped the expenses. Games were supposed to begin airing on NBC during the 2004–05 season, however a league lockout that resulted in the cancellation of that season delayed the start of the contract until the second half of the 2005–06 season. NBC televised regular season games at first on Saturday afternoons before moving the telecast to Sundays, Saturday and Sunday afternoon playoff games, and up to five games of the Stanley Cup Final. Additionally in 2008, NBC broadcast the first Winter Classic, an outdoor NHL game played on New Year's Day at Ralph Wilson Stadium, a success in attendance and television ratings. The following year's Winter Classic would become the most-watched regular season game in 34 years. In addition to this regular season success, game seven of the 2009 Stanley Cup Final was watched by an average of 8 million viewers, the highest ratings for an NHL game in 36 years.

The NFL also returned to NBC in 2006 after an eight-year hiatus, broadcasting the league's new flagship Sunday Night Football game, along with select postseason games and Super Bowl XLIII.

== 2010s ==
Former logo of NBC Sports, used from 2011 until 2023

In January 2011, telecommunications company Comcast finalized its acquisition of a majority share in NBC Universal. As a result of the merger, the operations of Comcast's existing sports networks, such as Golf Channel and Versus, were merged into an entity known as the NBC Sports Group. NBC Sports' senior vice president Mike McCarley additionally became Golf Channel's new head. NBC Sports' golf production unit was merged with Golf Channel, along with NBC's on-air staff, with that unit rebranding under the banner "Golf Channel on NBC", while Versus was reformatted toward a more mainstream audience, renamed the NBC Sports Network and eventually rebranded as NBCSN.

The merger also helped influence an extension of NBC Sports' contract with the NHL; the 10-year deal – valued at close to $2 billion, unified the cable and broadcast television rights to the league and introduced a new "Black Friday" Thanksgiving Showdown game on NBC, along with national coverage for every game in the Stanley Cup playoffs. On July 3, 2011, ESPN obtained the exclusive broadcast rights to Wimbledon in a 12-year deal, ending NBC's television relationship with The Championships after 42 years.

NBC continued its previous NFL programming, comprising NBC Sunday Night Football, select postseason games and Super Bowls XLVI, XLIX, and LII.

On August 10, 2011, NBC Sports announced a new three-year broadcasting contract with Major League Soccer to produce games for the 2012 season on NBC and the NBC Sports Network. This included the broadcast of two regular season games, two playoff games, and two national team matches on NBC and 38 regular season games, three playoff games, and two national team matches on NBC Sports Network. On October 28, 2012, NBC Sports also announced a three-year, $250 million deal to televise Premier League soccer in English (primarily on NBCSN) and Spanish (on Telemundo and mun2) beginning with the 2013–14 season, replacing ESPN and Fox Soccer as the league's U.S. broadcasters.

On October 15, 2012, NBC Sports announced that it had acquired broadcast rights to the Formula One World Championship (formerly held by Speed and Fox Sports) in a four-year deal with the series. The majority of its coverage (including much of the season, along with qualifying and practice sessions) would air on NBCSN, while NBC would air the Monaco Grand Prix, Canadian Grand Prix and the final two races of the season, which include the United States Grand Prix. All races will also be streamed online and through the NBC Sports Live Extra mobile app. On October 4, 2017, it was announced that NBC Sports lost the broadcast rights to ESPN beginning with the 2018–2019 season.

On March 18, 2013, nearly all of the operations for NBC Sports and NBCSN began to be based out of a purpose-built facility in Stamford, Connecticut. The move was made mainly to take advantage of tax credits given by the state of Connecticut, which NBC has taken advantage of previously with the daytime talk shows of its sister broadcast syndication division. Only Football Night in America remained in New York City, at Studio 8G in Rockefeller Center, until September 7, 2014, when production of that program also moved to Stamford.

In July 2013, NBC Sports reached a 10-year deal to restore NASCAR coverage to its properties for the first time since 2006. Beginning in the 2015 season, NBC and NBCSN televise coverage of the final 20 races of the Cup Series, and the final 19 races of the second-level circuit now known as the Xfinity Series. While no specific financial details were disclosed, NBC reportedly paid 50% more than ESPN and TNT (who took over the portion of the season previously held by NBC) combined under the previous deal.

In May 2015, NBCUniversal announced the formation of NBC Deportes, which will serve as a Spanish-language branch of NBC Sports for Telemundo and NBC Universo.

On June 7, 2015, NBC Sports and The R&A agreed to a twelve-year deal to televise The Open Championship, Senior Open Championship, and Women's British Open on NBC and Golf Channel, beginning in 2017. The move came a year after NBC lost the rights to USGA tournaments to Fox Sports. The R&A's deal with ESPN had been through 2017, but the broadcaster opted out of the final year of their agreement.

Universal Sports Network ceased operations in November 2015. NBCUniversal acquired the rights to the content that was previously held by Universal Sports Network. Much of the programming moved to Universal HD, with the rest of the programming moving to NBCSN and NBC Sports Live Extra.

On March 7, 2016, NBC Sports and England's Premiership Rugby agreed an initial three-year deal to televise the Aviva Premiership from the following season. Up to 24 regularly scheduled Game of the Week programs for each round of the premiership will air on NBCSN and up to 50 other games will also be streamed live throughout the season on NBC Sports Live Extra. NBC's first live match was on March 12, 2016, when London Irish hosted Saracens at the Red Bull Arena in New Jersey.

In June 2016, the group launched NBC Sports Gold, an over-the-top streaming service. It debuted with a Cycling Pass, featuring several UCI road cycling races. In April 2017, a Track and Field Pass was launched, featuring IAAF and USA Track & Field meets, a Rugby Pass featuring the English Premiership, and a Pro Motocross Pass featuring the AMA Motocross Championship. A Premier League Pass was added in June 2017.

On March 21, 2018, it was announced that NBC Sports would renew its contract with the IndyCar Series (continuing a relationship with NBCSN which began in 2009 as Versus), through 2021, and acquire the broadcast television rights previously held by ABC. NBC will televise seven races per-season beginning in 2019, including the series flagship Indianapolis 500, marking the first time since 1964 that ABC will not broadcast the race. On April 30, 2018, it was announced that NBC Sports would broadcast the WeatherTech SportsCar Championship in 2019, through 2024 in a six-year television agreement.

== 2020s ==
In March 2019, NBC agreed to a Super Bowl exchange with CBS; as a result, both Super Bowl LVI and the Winter Olympics were televised by NBC in 2022. As with Super Bowl LII, which fell prior to the 2018 Winter Olympics, the network is expected to maximize its advertising revenue by encouraging sponsors to buy time for both events.

Following the launch of NBCUniversal's streaming service Peacock, NBC Sports began to migrate some of its overflow content (including the Premier League and other NBC Sports Gold services) to the service. On June 29, 2020, Fox sold the last seven years of its contract to air USGA tournaments to NBC, regaining rights to the U.S. Open for the first time since 2015.

In January 2021, it was reported that NBCUniversal planned to shut down NBCSN by the end of the year; an internal memo cited increased competition from streaming services and the other mainstream sports networks as reasoning. The channel was officially shut down on December 31, 2021; its remaining programming rights were moved to other NBCUniversal platforms, particularly USA Network and Peacock.

NBC's contract with the NHL expired after the 2020–21 season, with the league signing new contracts with ESPN and TNT.

On April 6, 2022, NBC Sports announced a deal to carry a package of Sunday afternoon MLB games on Peacock branded as MLB Sunday Leadoff beginning in the 2022 season. NBC Sports declined to renew its deal after the 2023 season, with the package moving to Roku instead.

On July 1, 2022, NBC Sports announced that Olympic Channel would shut down as a linear channel on September 30, 2022.

On August 18, 2022, NBC Sports announced a seven-year deal to carry Big Ten Conference college athletics across its platforms beginning in the 2023–24 academic season. This contract will most notably include a new package of primetime Big Ten college football games on NBC beginning in the 2023 season, as well as a package of college basketball and Olympic sports coverage on Peacock.

Beginning with the 2023 NFL season, Peacock exclusively streams at least one regular season game per season. Most notably, Peacock exclusively streamed the Miami Dolphins–Kansas City Chiefs wild card playoff game during the 2023 season. The game drove 2.8 million sign-ups to Peacock and averaged 23 million viewers.

On June 11, 2024, TNT Sports officially announced a 10-year deal with the French Open, ending a broadcasting arrangement with NBC Sports dating back to 1983. Two days later, IndyCar and Fox agreed to a deal to broadcast the IndyCar Series, ending its 15-year partnership with NBC Sports.

On June 27, 2024, NBC Sports and the Big East Conference announced a six-year deal to begin in the 2025–26 academic year. NBC Sports will carry more than 60 men’s and women’s basketball regular season and tournament games. Peacock begins its coverage in the 2024–25 academic year with 25 regular season games and five early round and quarterfinal conference tournament games in men's basketball.

On July 23, 2024, Comcast confirmed during a conference call with investors that the NBA would return to NBC Sports in the 2025–26 season under an 11-year agreement; an official announcement was released by the NBA and NBC Sports the following day. NBC and Peacock will carry 100 regular season games throughout the season, including Monday night games on Peacock, regional Tuesday night games, and a package of Sunday night games following the conclusion of the NFL season. NBC will also carry a doubleheader on Martin Luther King Jr. Day, coverage of All-Star Weekend, and a slate of playoff games (including six conference finals over the length of the agreement). Rights to the NBA Finals will remain exclusive to ABC. The agreement also includes broadcasting rights to the Women's National Basketball Association (WNBA). NBC Sports' WNBA package includes more than 50 regular-season and first-round playoff games, seven WNBA semi-finals, and three WNBA Finals. WNBA games will air on NBC, USA Network, and Peacock.

On November 19, 2025, NBC Sports announced a new three-year deal to broadcast MLB games, with a deal consisting of Sunday Night Baseball, Opening Day and Labor Day primetime games, MLB Sunday Leadoff, MLB draft, All-Star Futures Game, and Wild Card Series games. Additionally, the network plans to broadcast all games exclusively on July 5, dubbed Roadblock. For 2027 and 2028, NBC will also showcase one of MLB's most popular special event games, as well as Game 2,430, the most consequential regular season game on the season's final day. Games will be streamed on Peacock and televised across NBC and NBCSN.
