= Chee Wan Hoe =

Malaysian footballer

Personal information
- Full name: Chee Wan Hoe
- Date of birth: 9 December 1971 (age 54)
- Place of birth: Malaysia
- Position: Defender

Youth career
- 1990–1991: Perak FA

Senior career*
Years	Team	Apps	(Gls)
1992–1997	Perak FA		
1998–2007	Penang FA	252	(2)
- * Club domestic league appearances and goals

Chee Wan Hoe (born 9 December 1971) is a Malaysian former footballer. He formerly played with Perak FA and Penang FA. He also represented Malaysia numerous times in the early 1990s, primarily as part of the national Under-23 squad during their Olympic qualification campaign. Malaysia Olympic Team (Malaysia U-23) in 1991.

== Career ==
Wan Hoe is one of the longest serving player for Penang FA. He help the team to win the 1998 and 2001 Malaysia Premier League I. In 2002, he helped Penang to win their first Malaysia FA Cup title by beating his former team Perak. On the next season, he clinch the Charity Shield with Penang. Despite winning the league title in 2001, Chee remains the last Chinese player to have captained a league-winning side — a triumph that still stands as Penang's last league title, more than two decades later.

Wan Hoe retired from professional football after the 2007 season ended. He was the longest-serving team captain for Penang FA and is regarded as one of the finest defenders to have played in the league during the 1990s and 2000s.

== Honours ==
=== Penang FA ===
- Malaysia Premier 1 League: 1998, 2001
- Malaysia FA Cup: 2002
- Malaysia Charity Shield: 2003
