= Chester Sidney Williams =

Chester Sidney Williams (1907–1992) was an American educator and writer who wrote extensively about education and freedoms.

Williams received a bachelor's degree from the University of California, Los Angeles. He worked as a representative of the Convention des Etudiants from 1928-1929. From 1930-1931 he was the Executive Secretary for the National Student Federation of America. He was a lecturer for adult education forums (1932–1934); Assistant to the U.S. Commission of Education (1934–1936); and Assistant Administrator of Federal Forum Program (1936–1941) under John W. Studebaker.

Williams' work with education on the national level did not end there. From 1941-1942, he was Director of Adult Civic Education for the U.S. Office of Education. For a year during World War II he worked in England for the Office of War Information in charge of distributing educational programs abroad. When he returned to the United States he worked as Chief of Educational Programs for the United Nations Relief and Rehabilitation Administration and at the Office of War Information, Overseas branch in Washington, D.C.

After the war he continued his work with the State Department and the United Nations until 1952, when he became President of World Information, Inc. During the 1940s and 1950s he wrote articles and books about various aspects of education and freedom.

After 1952 Williams' work with the U.S. government stopped. He then began working in earnest in the private sector. He started various private businesses and did public relations work for other companies and non-profit agencies. Among these were Hill and Knowlton, Inc., Gaynor and Ducas, Inc., American Cancer Society, International Rescue Committee, Hudson Institute, and Freedom House.

Even after his official retirement in 1968 he continued to be involved in community affairs, he even hosted radio and television talk shows.

== Works ==
- Ways of Dictatorship, by Chester S. Williams (Row, Peterson and Company - 1941)
- Voices of Democracy: A Handbook for Teachers, Speakers, and Writers by Bernard Molohon and Chester S. Williams
- Fair trial, (Our freedoms series, editor...John W. Studebaker) by Chester S Williams (Unknown Binding - 1941)
- Religious liberty, (Our freedoms series) by Chester S Williams (Unknown Binding - 1941)
- My Land of Liberty: Freedoms all Americans Defend, Chester S. Williams, ed. Racine, WI: Whitman Publishing Co. 1941.
- Liberty of the press, (California State series) by Chester S Williams (Unknown Binding - 1947)
- Freedom answers communism, by Chester S Williams (Unknown Binding - 1954)
- How progressive is John Dewey's philosophy of education? (University of Wichita bulletin) by Chester S Williams (Unknown Binding - 1959)
