= Chester Rapkin =

American urban planner, theorist, and economist

- Born: Chester Rapkin; 18 February 1918; New York City, U.S.
- Died: 28 January 2001 (aged 82)

Chester A. Rapkin (1918-2001) was an American urban planner, urban planning theorist, and economist who made important contributions to housing and renewal programs in the 1950s, 1960s and 1970s. He published an important study in the 1950s about land use and vehicular traffic patterns and served on the New York City Planning Commission from 1969 to 1977. He coined the name "SoHo" for Manhattan's SoHo neighborhood and became known as the "Father of SoHo".

== Early life and education ==
Rapkin was born in 1918 in Manhattan. He attended public schools and received his undergraduate degree from City College in 1939 and a doctorate in economics from Columbia University in 1953.

== Career ==
Before his graduate studies, he gained experience in the civil service at the Federal Home Loan Bank Administration, National Bureau of Economic Research, and National Housing Agency.

Beginning in the 1950s, he introduced quantitative methods and an integrated approach to urban planning. From 1954 through 1966, he was on the University of Pennsylvania faculty as professor of city and regional planning, and chairman of the urban studies group. He moved on to Columbia University, where he served as professor of urban planning in the Graduate School of Architecture and director of Columbia's Institute of Urban Environment.

In 1962, as chairman of the University of Pennsylvania's urban study group, he coined the term "SoHo" for the Manhattan neighborhood of that name in a study of the community. The study has been credited with saving the area known today as SoHo from demolition.

In 1965 and 1966, he was staff director of President Lyndon B. Johnson's Presidential Task Force on Urban Problems, which proposed the federally financed Model Cities Program.

Beginning in 1964, he served as a visiting professor numerous times at Israel's Technion-Israel Institute of Technology, where he was instrumental in the country's urban renewal programs.

In 1969, New York City Mayor John V. Lindsay appointed him to the New York City Planning Commission, on which he served for eight years.

He joined the urban planning faculty at Princeton University's School of Architecture and Urban Planning in 1973 and retired from the post in 1988.

From 1979 to 1981 he was Chairman of the Governors' Task Force on the Future of the Tri-State Regional Planning Commission.

== Selected Writings ==
Prof. Rapkin authored 15 books and monographs and more than 100 professional articles, plans and reports. His archives are at the Architectural Archives of the University of Pennsylvania.

His 1954 book Urban Traffic: A Function of Land Use, written with Robert B. Mitchell and published by Columbia University Press, pioneered the idea that urban planning should take vehicular traffic patterns into account.

His 1959 study "Residential Renewal in the Urban Core", commissioned by the Philadelphia Redevelopment Authority and co-written with William G. Grigsby, provided city planners with data for the Society Hill project and, more generally, wisdom on creating a renewal program that could succeed despite opposing market trends. It led to commissions for more than 100 reports for cities including New York, Boston, and Honolulu as well as projects in Korea, China, Australia and Israel.

He co-authored pioneering studies of changing racial demographics from an economic perspective, including 1960s "The Demand for Housing in Racially Mixed Areas, A Study in Neighborhood Change" and 1966's "Price Discrimination Against Negroes in the Rental Housing Market". The latter showed how Blacks paid more in rent than whites.

== Honors and legacy ==
In 1985 the New York metropolitan chapter of the American Planning Association honored him with its Meritorious Achievement Award.

In 1998, upon Rapkin's retirement from Princeton, the Journal of Planning Education and Research began awarding an annual cash grant called the Chester Rapkin Award for the Best Paper.

A plaque honoring Rapkin is installed on a building on Prince Street between Wooster Street and West Broadway in Manhattan. It reads: "Chester Rapkin / 1918–2001 / Father of SoHo / Scholar, City Planner, Visionary Urbanist, Who Transformed A Moribund Industrial Zone Into A Vital Artistic Commercial And Residential Community / New York City Planning Commissioner / 1969–1977".

In 2015 mixologist Jeremy Oertel created a mixed drink called the Chester Rapkin for the Soho Grand Hotel in Manhattan.

In 2022 a newly created public plaza in SoHo was named Rapkin-Gayle Plaza after Rapkin and Margot Gayle.

== Personal life ==
Chester Rapkin married Eva Samuel in 1942. He died of pneumonia on January 28, 2001, in New Brunswick, New Jersey. Eva died in 2013.
