= Chee (given name) =

Chee is a unisex given name. Notable people with the name include:

- Chee Dodge (1860–1947), American politician
- Chee Soo (1919–1994), English writer

== See also ==
- Chee (surname)
- Chet (given name), English masculine given name
- Ji (Korean name), surname and given name also spelled "Chee"
