= Chee (surname) =

Chee is a Chinese and Navajo surname. It may refer to the Min Nan or Hokkien pronunciation of the Chinese surname pronounced Xú (徐) in Mandarin, or the Cantonese pronunciation of the surname 朱 (zyu^{1}, Zhū in Mandarin). As a Navajo surname, it is derived from the root -CHIIʼ, meaning "red". It is also a variant romanization of the Korean surname Ji. Notable people with the surname include:

== 徐 ==
- Chee Kim Thong (1920–2001), Chinese martial artist
- Chee Soon Juan (born 1962), Singaporean politician
- Chee Hong Tat (born 1974), Singaporean politician

== 朱 ==
- Chee Gaik Yap (1981–2006), Malaysian rape-murder victim
- Jason Chee Weng Fai (born 1983), Singaporean para table tennis player

== 齐 ==
- Pamelyn Chee, 21st century Singaporean actress

== Chee ==
- Alexander Chee (born 1967), American writer
- Benjamin Chee Chee (1944–1977), Canadian painter
- Chee Wan Hoe (born 1971), Malaysian footballer
- Dyandre Chee (died 2023), Belizean crime victim
- Karen Chee (born 1995), American comedian and essayist
- Robert Chee (1937–1972), Navajo artist
- Traci Chee, (born 1985), American writer
- Chee Dodge (1860–1947), Navajo leader

== Fictional characters ==
- Jim Chee, Navajo Tribal Police detective in the novels of Tony Hillerman

== See also ==
- Chee (given name)
