= Chuck Howard =

American television executive (1933–1996)

Charles (Chuck) Howard (1933 – November 21, 1996) was an American television executive, and a pioneer in television sports broadcasting.

== Biography ==
=== Early life and career ===
Howard was born in 1933. He graduated from Duke University in 1955, where he was a member of the Beta Theta Pi fraternity.

Following his college graduation, Howard entered the management training program at Chase Manhattan Bank. In 1960, he made an abrupt career turn and became a production assistant at Edgar J. Scherick's company, Sports Programs, Inc., the forerunner to ABC Sports.

=== ABC Sports ===
In 1961, Roone Arledge charged him with scouting sports events throughout the world in an effort to discover sports that had a loyal following but might be unknown to American television viewers. The result was the April 21, 1961 debut of Wide World of Sports, the groundbreaking television sports anthology program.

Arledge, Howard and commentator Jim McKay created the show on a week-by-week basis during its first year of broadcast, establishing a sports television tradition in the process.

Howard went on to become a vice president for programming at ABC Sports and covered nine Olympic Games, the Super Bowl, World Series, British Open, Kentucky Derby, Indianapolis 500 and NCAA football—as well as Acapulco cliff diving, Demolition Derby, rodeos, bobsled racing, arm wrestling and Evel Knievel's daredevil antics.

Howard is credited with being the first to use a split screen and an isolated camera to highlight a part of a play away from the main action.

On April 8, 1967, due to an AFTRA strike, Howard and director Chet Forte filled-in as commentators for game 4 of the NBA Eastern Conference finals between the Boston Celtics and Philadelphia 76ers. He oversaw the broadcast of the 1972 Summer Olympics in Munich, Germany, notable for the massacre of 11 Israeli team members by Palestinian terrorists.

=== Departure from ABC and later career ===
In 1986, Howard left ABC and became the executive producer for the Big Ten Conference's football and basketball broadcasts. In 1991, he was named the executive producer at Trans World International, overseeing such events as the New York City Marathon, the America's Cup, and world coverage of the Masters golf tournament, as well as figure skating and tennis events.

=== Death ===
Howard died of brain cancer on November 21, 1996, in Pound Ridge, New York.

== Honors ==
Wide World of Sports became the longest-running continuing series on ABC, and it won numerous Peabody Awards and Emmy Awards. Howard himself won 11 Emmy Awards as a producer. In 2009, Chuck Howard was one of the eight inducted into the Sports Broadcasting Hall of Fame in New York, New York
