= Chester Baker Slawson =

Mineralogist

Chester Baker Slawson (April 12, 1898 – March 12, 1964) was a professor of mineralogy at the University of Michigan.

After his death, the Slawson Memorial fund was created at the University of Michigan and in 2004 the first Slawson Fellowship was awarded to a student of the Department of Geological Sciences.

The mineral slawsonite, which has the chemical formula (Sr,Ca)Al_{2}Si_{2}O_{8} and was described in 1977, was named in his honor.
