= Chet Forte =

American sports media personality (1935–1996)

Personal information
- Born: August 7, 1935 Hackensack, New Jersey, U.S.
- Died: May 18, 1996 (aged 60) San Diego, California, U.S.
- Listed height: 5 ft 8 in (1.73 m)
- Listed weight: 145 lb (66 kg)

Career information
- High school: Hackensack (Hackensack, New Jersey)
- College: Columbia (1954–1957)
- NBA draft: 1957: 7th round, 49th overall pick
- Drafted by: Cincinnati Royals
- Position: Point guard
- Number: 40

Career history
- 1957: College All-Stars
- 1957–1959: Williamsport Billies

Career highlights
- UPI Player of the Year (1957); Consensus first-team All-American (1957); 2× First-team All-Ivy (1955, 1957); Haggerty Award (1957); No. 40 retired by Columbia Lions
- Stats at Basketball Reference

Fulvio Chester Forte Jr. (August 7, 1935 – May 18, 1996) was an American television director and sports radio talk show host. He was also a standout college basketball player for Columbia and was the UPI Player of the Year in 1956–57. After dabbling in semi-pro leagues, he moved on to work in broadcasting. He was hired by ABC in 1963, where he worked for 25 years. He served as producer and director for a variety of broadcasts, most notably in sports for the Olympic Games (1968, 1984), the Indianapolis 500, and football, which earned him eleven Emmy Awards. He was the first director of Monday Night Football, which he oversaw from its inception in 1970 until he was fired from ABC in 1987. As such, he was featured prominently in his exploits (such as his gambling addiction, which later doomed his career) and innovations in Monday Night Mayhem, a book about the early years of the program that was later turned into a film (in which he was played by Nicholas Turturro).

== Early life ==
Forte's life in the sports world began as an All-State basketball star at Hackensack High School in Hackensack, New Jersey. He was named to the Star-Ledger's Team of the Century in 1999. From there he starred at Columbia University. In the 1956–57 season, he was named first-team All-American as a point guard, and beat out the legendary Wilt Chamberlain for player of the year. He was short for a basketball player, but shot with deadly accuracy from the outside—the approximate location of today's three-point circle.

Forte was drafted in the 7th round of the 1957 NBA draft by the Cincinnati Royals, but did not make the team, and never played in the NBA. He played for the Williamsport Billies of the Eastern Professional Basketball League from 1957 to 1959.

== ABC Sports ==
Forte began working in TV, starting as a production assistant for CBS in 1958. He joined ABC Sports in 1963. On April 8, 1967, due to an AFTRA strike, Forte and producer Chuck Howard filled-in as commentators for Game 4 of the NBA Eastern Conference finals between the Boston Celtics and Philadelphia 76ers.

In 1970, Forte was named the first director of Monday Night Football. His ability to present the game as entertainment spectacle as well as sporting event, under the mandate of executive producer Roone Arledge, made the show a huge success in both sports and pop culture, most notably with the increased use of cameras in intimate spaces to go along with pairing the broadcast with statistical information that have become standard practice today.

Forte was often abusive to subordinates, including production assistants on Monday Night Football, who "began to root for one of the cameramen to screw up so it would take the heat off them." He once forced a production assistant to change hotel rooms to take a less opulent room, despite the fact that the hotel had upgraded the room at no extra cost to ABC. "Who the hell do you think you are with a room like that?," he said to the subordinate, "you're just a p.a."

Further, Forte and producer Don Ohlmeyer used their MNF positions to seduce women who attended games they were covering: "The so-called honey shots – those tight close-ups of a beauty in the stands or on the sidelines – often held special meaning on Monday Night Football." Forte would tell camera operators to proposition comely female spectators: "Tell her who I am. Tell her I'm rich. Ask her if she'd like to be on national television." Arledge was aware of the "X-rated activities taking place on the ABC caravan" and excused it as part of "'what made the show what it was.'"

=== Departure from ABC Sports ===
Despite his professional success, Forte had a huge gambling addiction which he kept behind the scenes. ABC executives feared his gambling activities were affecting his job which led to his departure from ABC in 1987. He was also indicted by a federal grand jury on three-counts of mail fraud and tax evasion. He cooperated with the government and was spared prison time, receiving a five-year probation sentence.

== Post-ABC activities ==
In 1989, he directed the roller derby program RollerGames. The next year, he became a talk show host at San Diego's XTRA, also known as "XTRA Sports 690." He co-hosted the Loose Cannons show with Steve Hartman. On the show, he openly discussed his addiction and offered to help others in a similar situation.

== Death ==
Forte was working on-the-air days prior to his death on May 18, 1996, in San Diego, California. Forte, who was known for his junk food obsession and for chain-smoking his way through telecasts, died suddenly of a heart attack at the age of 60. His family filed a wrongful death lawsuit against his cardiologist, Dr. Steven Gross, alleging that the doctor was negligent in his treatment of Forte. The jury agreed and awarded the family US$1.7 million.
