= Baseball telecasts technology =

Chronological list

Chronological list of the technological advancements of Major League Baseball television broadcasts:

== 1930s and 1940s ==
=== 1939 ===
On August 26, the first ever Major League Baseball telecast (the Brooklyn Dodgers vs. Cincinnati Reds from Ebbets Field) aired by W2XBS, an experimental station in New York City which would ultimately become WNBC-TV.

Red Barber called the game without the benefit of a monitor and with only two cameras capturing the game. One camera was on Barber and the other was behind the plate. Barber had to guess from which light was on and where it pointed.

In 1939, baseball games were usually covered by one camera providing a point-of-view along the third base line.

=== 1949 ===
1. Equipment: Three black-and-white cameras, all located on the Mezzanine level.
2. Camera lenses: Fixed, no zoom capabilities.
3. Replays: None
4. Graphics: None
5. Audio: One microphone on the play-by-play announcer.

== 1950s ==
=== 1951 ===
On August 11, 1951, WCBS-TV in New York City televised the first baseball game (in which the Boston Braves beat the Brooklyn Dodgers by the score of 8–1) in color.

On October 3 of that year, NBC aired the first coast-to-coast baseball telecast as the Brooklyn Dodgers were beaten by the New York Giants in the final game of a playoff series by the score of 5-4 (off Bobby Thomson's now-legendary home run).

=== 1953 ===
1. Equipment: Four black-and-white cameras, all located on the Mezzanine level.
2. Camera lenses: Fixed, no zoom capabilities.
3. Video: Quality of picture has improved since the 1940s.
4. Replay: None
5. Graphics: White-text containing one line of information.
6. Audio: One microphone on the play-by-play announcer and one mic is suspended from the press box for crowd noise.

=== 1955 ===
1955 marked the first time that the World Series was televised in color.

=== 1957 ===
1. Equipment: Four cameras on Mezzanine level while a fifth camera is added in center field.
2. Camera lenses: Three fixed lenses on each camera that's manually rotated by a camera operator.
3. Video: Quality of picture is a very sharp black-and-white.
4. Replays: None
5. Graphics: White-text only; information about the balls and strikes are added.
6. Broadcasters: Analysts added to broadcast alongside the play-by-play announcer.
7. Audio: One mic is suspended from the press box for crowd noise.

== 1960s ==
=== 1961 ===
1. Equipment: Five cameras: Four on the Mezzanine level and one in center field.
2. Camera lenses: Zoom capability existed albeit, limited.
3. Video: Black-and-white picture quality has improved.
4. Replays: Yes; regular speed; no longer than thirty seconds long at a line angle only.
5. Graphics: White-text only including two lines of text.
6. Audio: Improved - Audience can now hear the crack of the bat.

=== 1962 ===
On July 23, 1962, Major League Baseball had its first satellite telecast (via Telstar Communications). The telecast included portion of a contest between the Chicago Cubs vs. the Philadelphia Phillies from Wrigley Field with Jack Brickhouse commentating on WGN-TV.

=== 1969 ===
By 1969, the usage of chroma key (in which the commentators would open a telecast by standing in front of a greenscreen composite of the stadiums' crowds) became a common practice for baseball telecasts.

1. Equipment: Five cameras: Four on the Mezzanine level and one in center field.
2. Camera lenses: Zoom capability existed albeit, limited.
3. Video: Color became an industry standard.
4. Replays: Yes; regular speed; no longer than thirty seconds long at a line angle.
5. Graphics: Electronic graphics introduced.
6. Audio: Improved - Audience can now hear the crack of the bat.

== 1970s ==
=== 1974 ===
1. Equipment: Seven cameras: One at first and third base each, one at home plate, one at center field, one at left field, and each in the dugout.
2. Camera lenses: 18×1; the batter can now be seen from head to toe.
3. Video: Color quality has improved since the 1960s.
4. Replays: Slow-motion from all camera angles.
5. Graphics: Video font with two color capabilities.
6. Audio: Mono. - much improved quality; an effect microphone is placed near the field.

=== 1975 ===
In the bottom of the 12th inning of Game 6 of the 1975 World Series at Boston's Fenway Park, Red Sox catcher Carlton Fisk was facing Cincinnati Reds pitcher Pat Darcy. Fisk then hit a pitch down the left field line that appeared to be heading to foul territory. The enduring image of Fisk jumping and waving the ball fair as he made his way to first base is arguably one of baseball's greatest moments. The ball struck the foul pole, giving the Red Sox a 7–6 win and forcing a seventh and deciding game of the Fall Classic. During this time, cameramen covering baseball games were instructed to follow the flight of the ball; reportedly, Fisk's reaction was only being recorded because NBC cameraman Lou Gerard, positioned inside Fenway's scoreboard at the base of the left-field Green Monster wall, had become distracted by a large rat. This play was perhaps the most important catalyst in getting camera operators to focus most of their attention on the players themselves.

== 1980s ==
=== 1983 ===
On July 6, 1983, NBC televised the All-Star Game out of Chicago's Comiskey Park. During the telecast, special guest analyst, Don Sutton helped introduce NBC's new pitching tracking device dubbed The NBC Tracer. The NBC Tracer was a stroboscopic comet tail showing the path of a pitch to the catcher's glove. For instance, The NBC Tracer helped track a Dave Stieb curveball among others.

=== 1985 ===
In 1985, NBC's telecast of the All-Star Game out of the Metrodome in Minnesota was the first program to be broadcast in stereo by a television network.

1. Equipment: Eight cameras: One at first and third base each, one at home plate (a low home angle is added), one each in right field, center field and left field, and one in each dugout.
2. Camera lenses: 40×1; tight shots of players are routine.
3. Replays: Super slow-motion replays became a new technology.
4. Graphics: Computer generated in multiple colors.
5. Audio: Mono - much improved quality.

=== 1987 ===
For the 1987 World Series between the Minnesota Twins and St. Louis Cardinals, ABC utilized 12 cameras and nine tape machines. This includes cameras positioned down the left field line, on the roof of the Metrodome, and high above third base.

== 1990s ==
=== 1990 ===
In 1990, CBS took over from both ABC and NBC as Major League Baseball's national, over-the-air television provider. They in the process brought along their telestration technology that they dubbed CBS Chalkboard. CBS Chalkboard made its debut eight years earlier during CBS' coverage of Super Bowl XVI.

=== 1992 ===
For CBS' coverage of the 1992 All-Star Game, they introduced Basecam, a lipstick-size camera, inside first base.

=== 1993 ===
During CBS' coverage of the 1993 World Series, umpires were upset with the overhead replays being televised by CBS. Dave Phillips, the crew chief, said just prior to Game 2 that the umpires want "CBS to be fair with their approach."

Rick Gentile, the senior vice president for production of CBS Sports, said that Richie Phillips, the lawyer for the Major League Umpires Association, tried to call the broadcast booth during Saturday's game, but the call was not put through. Richie Phillips apparently was upset when Dave Phillips called the Philadelphia Phillies' Ricky Jordan out on strikes in the fourth inning, and a replay showed the pitch to be about 6 inches outside.

National League President Bill White, while using a CBS headset in the broadcast booth during Game 1, was overheard telling Gentile and the producer Bob Dekas:

You guys keep using that camera the way you want. Don't let Phillips intimidate you.

=== 1995 ===
- April 1995 - ESPN debuted in-game box scores during Major League Baseball telecasts. Hitting, pitching and fielding stats from the game are shown along the bottom of the screen three times per game.

=== 1996 ===
1. Equipment: Ten cameras: Eight human-operated cameras plus two robotic cameras. Six tape machines plus one digital disk recorder.
2. Camera lenses: 55×1
3. Graphics: Computer generated and in high resolution; the FoxBox is introduced.
4. Audio: In Stereo and surround sound; wireless mics are placed in the bases.

=== 1997 ===
- May/June 1997 - ESPN debuted MaskCam on an umpire at the College World Series.

On July 8, 1997, Fox televised its first ever All-Star Game (out of Jacobs Field in Cleveland). For this particular game, Fox introduced "Catcher-Cam" in which a camera was affixed to the catchers' masks in order to provide unique perspectives of the action around home plate. Catcher-Cam soon would become a regular fixture in Fox's baseball broadcasts.

In addition to Catcher-Cam, other innovations (some of which have received more acclaim than others) that Fox has provided for baseball telecasts have been:

- Sennheiser MKE-2 microphones and SK-250 transmitters in the bases.
- Between 12 and 16 microphones throughout the outfield, ranging from Sennheiser MKH-416 shotgun microphones to DPA 4061s with Crystal Partners Big Ear parabolic microphones to Crown Audio PCC160 plate microphones.
- The continuous "FoxBox" graphic, which contained the score, inning and other information in an upper corner of the TV screen. Since 2001, the FoxBox has morphed into a strip across the top of the screen which would later be used by other sports networks.
- Audio accompanying graphics and sandwiched replays between "whooshes."
- "Mega Slo-Mo" technology.
- Scooter, a cartoony 3-D animated talking baseball (voiced by Tom Kenny) that occasionally appears to explain pitch types and mechanics, purportedly for younger viewers—approximately the 10- to 12-year-olds.
- Ball Tracer, a stroboscopic comet tail showing the path of a pitch to the catcher's glove.
- Strike Zone, which shows pitch sequences with strikes in yellow and balls in white. It can put a simulated pane of glass that shatters when a ball goes through the zone (à la the computerized scoring graphics used for bowling).
- The "high home" camera from high behind home plate. Its purpose is that it can trace the arc of a home run and measure the distance the ball traveled. The "high home" camera can also measure a runner's lead off first base while showing in different colors (green, yellow, red) and how far off the base and into pickoff danger a runner is venturing.

== 2000s ==
=== 2000 ===
For a Saturday afternoon telecast of a Los Angeles Dodgers/Chicago Cubs game at Wrigley Field on August 26, 2000, Fox aired a special "Turn Back the Clock" broadcast to commemorate the 61st anniversary of the first televised baseball game. The broadcast started with a re-creation of the television technology of 1939, with play-by-play announcer Joe Buck working alone with a single microphone, a single black-and-white camera, and no graphics; then, each subsequent half-inning would see the broadcast "jump ahead in time" to a later era, showing the evolving technologies and presentation of network baseball coverage through the years.

=== 2001 ===
- April 15, 2001 - ESPN Dead Center debuted on Sunday Night Baseball with the Texas Rangers versus the Oakland Athletics. This new camera angle, directly behind the pitcher, is used provide true depiction of inside/outside pitch location and is used in certain parks in conjunction with K Zone.
- July 1, 2001 - ESPN's K Zone officially debuted on Sunday Night Baseball.
- The FoxBox becomes a banner at the top of the screen.

=== 2002 ===
- April 7, 2002 - ESPN became the first network to place a microphone on a player during a regular-season baseball game. "Player Mic" was worn by Oakland catcher Ramón Hernández (who also wore "MaskCam") and taped segments were heard.
- May 26, 2002 - "UmpireCam" debuted on ESPN, worn by Matt Hollowell behind the plate in the New York Yankees at Boston Red Sox telecast.

In October 2002, Fox televised the first ever World Series to be shown in high definition.

=== 2003 ===
- March 30, 2003 - ESPNHD, a high-definition simulcast service of ESPN, debuted with the first regular-season Major League Baseball game of the season - Texas at Anaheim.

=== 2004 ===
- April 2004 - ESPN's Sunday Night Baseball telecasts added a fantasy baseball bottom line, updating viewers on the stats for their rotisserie league players at 15 and 45 minutes after the hour.

Starting in 2004, some TBS telecasts (mostly Fridays or Saturdays) became more enhanced. The network decided to call it Braves TBS Xtra. Enhancements included catcher cam, Xtra Motion, which featured the type of pitch and movement, also leadOff Line. It would also show features with inside access to players.

In October 2004, Fox started airing all Major League Baseball postseason broadcasts (including the League Championship Series and World Series) in high definition. Fox also started airing the Major League Baseball All-Star Game in HD the following year. At the same time, the FoxBox and graphics are upgraded.

=== 2005 ===
- April 13, 2005 - "SkyCam" premiered during Sunday Night Baseball on ESPN. "SkyCam" is mounted more than 20 feet above the stands in foul territory and travels down a designated base path (first or third base line, from behind home plate to the foul pole), capturing overhead views of the action. The remote-controlled camera can zoom, pan and tilt.

=== 2006 ===
- April 2, 2006 - A handheld camera brings viewers closer to the action for in-game live shots of home run celebrations, managers approaching the mound and more.
- May 1, 2006 - 'K Zone 2.0' debuted on ESPN's Monday Night Baseball.

=== 2007 ===
For their 2007 Division Series coverage, TBS debuted various new looks, such as the first live online views from cameras in dugouts and ones focused on pitchers. TBS also introduced a graphic that creates sort of a rainbow to trace the arc of pitches on game replays. The graphic was superimposed in the studio so analysts like Cal Ripken Jr. for instance, could take virtual cuts at pitches thrown in games.

=== 2009 ===
During their 2009 playoff coverage, TBS displays their PitchTrax graphic full-time during at-bats (with the center field camera only) during the high-definition version of the broadcast in the extreme right-hand corner of the screen.

Meanwhile, for their own 2009 playoff coverage, Fox announced that they would occasionally include this stat on replays: Speed of pitches as they leave pitchers' hands as well as their speed when they cross home plate.

== 2010s ==
=== 2010 ===
- YES Network and NESN integrates the pitch count on to their on screen graphics. ESPN would follow suit, while also re-hashing their score bug akin to Monday Night Football, now featuring dots instead of numbers to represent the balls, strikes and outs.
- The 2010 All-Star Game marked the first time the annual game would be shown in 3D. Kenny Albert and Mark Grace had the call.
- On September 29, Fox announced that their plans to use cable-cams for their coverage of the National League Championship Series and World Series. The cable-cams according to Fox, can roam over the field at altitudes ranging from about 12 to 80 feet above ground. They will be able to provide overhead shots of, among other things, "close plays" at bases and "managers talking to their pitchers on the mound."

=== 2011 ===
With the start of the 2011 postseason, TBS planned to introduce the following

- Bloomberg Stats: TBS would use Bloomberg Stats as means to integrate comprehensive statistical information into each telecast.
- Liberovision: This is an innovative 3D interactive telestrator meant to give fans a new perspective of instant replays.
- New graphics that intend to feature improved functionality with a nostalgic feel.
- Pitch Trax: An in-game technology that illustrates pitch location throughout the games.

The screen on TBS's standard definition 4:3 feed now airs a letterboxed version of the native HD feed to match Fox's default widescreen SD presentation, allowing the right side pitch tracking graphic to be seen by SD viewers.

For the 2011 World Series, Fox debuted infrared technology that's designed to pinpoint heat made by a ball making contact — with, say, bats, face masks, players' bodies — and mark the spot for viewers by making it glow. During Game 1, Fox used "Hot Spot" to show that a batted ball was fouled off Texas Rangers batter Adrián Beltré's foot.

=== 2012 ===
Fox's 2012 World Series coverage would include a camera whose replays could generate as many as 20,000 frames per second, the most ever seen on Fox—and up from about 60 frames per second on regular replays. The camera would allow viewers "to see the ball compress" when batted, similar to how cameras now show golf balls getting compressed when struck. The technology for the camera originated with the U.S. military looking at replays of missile impacts.

=== 2016 ===
At the beginning of the 2016 season, TBS introduced new graphics that were used all season including the postseason.

The score box, which was originally docked to the top and left edges of the screen, was completely redesigned for 2017 after much criticism during the 2016 postseason for its large size. Like the 2016 score bug, the current one still stands in the top left corner, only it is smaller.

== 2020s ==
=== 2020 ===
The 2020 season was delayed until July due to the COVID-19 pandemic. Fox soon announced that they would virtually fill the seats of Chicago's Wrigley Field, Los Angeles' Dodger Stadium, Washington's Nationals Park, San Diego's Petco Park and other ballparks that it broadcasts games over the next several weeks. Announcers later spent time explaining and demonstrating the use of virtual fans during the July 25 game between the Chicago Cubs-Milwaukee Brewers at Wrigley Field.

=== 2025 ===
The 2025 World Series featured the debut of new augmented reality (AR) graphics as a core part of the Fox Sports broadcast. These features were designed to overlay data directly onto live camera feeds rather than using 3D recreations.

- Swing Tracker: This tool used Statcast data to show viewers the full swing path of the bat in real-time. It featured a multi-colored trail that visualized the bat's speed and path through the strike zone, along with the exit velocity of the ball at the moment of contact.
- Umpire PitchTrack: This graphic integrated pitch tracking directly into the "Ump Cam" (the camera worn by the home plate umpire). Using optical tracking technology, it showed a steady outline of the strike zone and the ball's path from the umpire's perspective, even as the camera moved.
- Drone Enhancements: Fox also introduced AR graphics on live drone shots, allowing the broadcast to display player stats and field positions over aerial views of the stadium during breaks in play.

== See also ==
- Digital on-screen graphic
- FoxBox (sports)
- Instant replay
- Major League Baseball television contracts
- Score bug
