= Major League Baseball on television in the 1990s =

On December 14, 1988, CBS (under the guidance of Commissioner Peter Ueberroth) paid approximately $1.8 billion for exclusive television rights for over four years (beginning in 1990). CBS paid about $265 million each year for the World Series, League Championship Series, All-Star Game, and the Saturday Game of the Week. It was one of the largest agreements (to date) between the sport of baseball and the business of broadcasting.

On January 5, 1989, Major League Baseball signed a $400 million deal with ESPN, who would show over 175 games beginning in 1990. For the next four years, ESPN would televise six games a week (Sunday, Wednesday Night Baseball, doubleheaders on Tuesdays and Fridays, plus holidays).

The deal with CBS was also supposed to pay each team $10 million a year. A separate deal with cable television would bring each team an additional $4 million. Each team could also cut its own deal with local television. For example, the New York Yankees signed with a cable network (MSG) that would pay the team $41 million annually for 12 years. Radio broadcast rights can bring in additional money. Reportedly, after the huge television contracts with CBS and ESPN were signed, ballclubs spent their excess millions on free agents.

In the end, CBS wound up losing approximately half a billion dollars from their television contract with Major League Baseball. CBS repeatedly asked Major League Baseball for a rebate, but MLB wasn't willing to do this.

== Year-by-year breakdown ==
=== 1990 ===
As previously mentioned, on January 5, 1989, Major League Baseball signed a $400 million deal with ESPN, who would show over 175 games beginning in 1990. For the next four years, ESPN would televise six games a week (Sunday Night Baseball, Wednesday Night Baseball and doubleheaders on Tuesdays and Fridays), as well as multiple games on Opening Day, Memorial Day, Independence Day, and Labor Day.

On April 15, 1990, ESPN's Sunday Night Baseball debuted with the experienced play-by-play announcer Jon Miller joining retired Hall of Fame player Joe Morgan in the broadcast booth. In its first year, Sunday Night Baseball averaged a 3.0 rating. That was double the number that ESPN as a whole was averaging at the time (1.5). By 1998, ESPN enjoyed its largest baseball audience ever (a 9.5 Nielsen rating) as Mark McGwire hit his 61st home run of the season. When ESPN first broadcast Sunday Night Baseball, they would show at least one game from every ballpark. Also, every team was guaranteed an appearance. It was essentially, the television equivalent to a cross country stadium tour.

Meanwhile, Major League Baseball's four-season tenure with CBS (1990–1993) was marred by turmoil and shortcomings throughout. The original plan was for Brent Musburger to be the primary play-by-play announcer for CBS' baseball telecasts (thus, having the tasks of calling the All-Star Game, National League Championship Series and World Series), with veteran broadcaster and lead CBS Radio baseball voice Jack Buck to serve as the secondary announcer (which would involve calling a second weekly game and the American League Championship Series). Former ABC color commentator Tim McCarver was hired by CBS to be Musburger's partner while NBC's Jim Kaat was hired to be Buck's. However, weeks before CBS was to debut its MLB coverage, on April 1, 1990, Musburger was fired by the network over what CBS perceived to be a power grab by Musburger in taking on the assignment (at the time, Musburger was CBS' lead college basketball announcer, host of The NFL Today, and was the main studio host for the NBA and had felt that he had been given too many broadcasting assignments by the network).

With Musburger's firing, Buck was moved up to the primary announcing team alongside McCarver. His position as backup announcer alongside Kaat was taken by CBS' lead NBA announcer, Dick Stockton. Studio host Greg Gumbel took over for Stockton as the secondary play-by-play announcer in 1993. Gumbel was in return, replaced by Andrea Joyce, who served as a field reporter for the first three seasons of CBS' coverage. On the teaming of Buck and McCarver, Broadcasting magazine wrote "The network has exclusivity, much rides on them." Joining the team of Buck and McCarver was Lesley Visser (who was, incidentally, married to the aforementioned Dick Stockton), became the first woman to cover the World Series in 1990.

CBS initially did not want to start their 1990 coverage until after the network had aired that year's NBA Finals (which was the last time CBS aired the Finals before the NBA's move to NBC). Therefore, only 12 regular season telecasts were scheduled The broadcasts would have been each Saturday from June 16 through August 25 and a special Sunday telecast on the weekend of August 11–12 (the New York Yankees against the Oakland Athletics in Oakland on both days). Ultimately, four more telecasts were added – two in April and two on the last two Saturdays of the season.

Meanwhile, Jim Kaat earned rave reviews for his role as CBS' backup analyst (which flashed a considerable "good-guy air"). Ron Bergman wrote of Kaat's performance during the 1990 ALCS, "This was a night for pitchers to excel. Dave Stewart. Roger Clemens. Jim Kaat [on commentary]." Despite the rave reviews, Jim Kaat admitted that he was frustrated. He felt that at that point and time, the idea of figuring out what to talk about during a three-hour broadcast had become intimidating. As a result, Kaat would bring notes into the booth, but in the process, found himself providing too much detail. He ultimately confided in his broadcasting partner, Dick Stockton, that he wanted to work without notes. So Stockton hooked Kaat up with then-lead NFL on CBS color commentator, John Madden for a telephone seminar. Madden said if he brought notes into the booth he felt compelled to use them and would "force" something into a telecast. On his seminar with John Madden, Jim Kaat said "Then John told me if he did his homework it would be stored in his memory bank. And if it is important it will come out. If it doesn't, it probably wasn't that important."

A mildly notorious moment came during CBS' coverage of the 1990 All-Star Game from Wrigley Field in Chicago. In a game that was marred by rain delays for a combined 85 minutes (including a 68-minute monsoon during the 7th inning), CBS annoyed many diehard fans by airing the William Shatner-hosted reality series Rescue 911 during the delay.

The 1990 postseason started on a Thursday, while World Series started on a Tuesday due to the brief lockout. Major League Baseball and CBS went with some rather unconventional scheduling during the LCS round, with two consecutive scheduled off-days in the NLCS after Game 2.

After NBC lost the Major League Baseball package to CBS, the network aggressively counterprogrammed CBS' postseason baseball coverage with made-for-TV movies and miniseries geared towards female viewers.

CBS' first year of Major League Baseball postseason coverage in general, proved to be problematic for the network. First and foremost, none of the teams involved in the ALCS (Boston and Oakland), NLCS (Cincinnati and Pittsburgh), and World Series (Cincinnati and Oakland) involved teams from baseball's largest media markets. This more than likely, helped reduce playoff ratings by 9.4% for prime time games and 3.4% for weekend daytime games. This was below the levels of the playoffs the year before, when they aired on NBC.

While the ratings for the 1990 World Series improved to 26.2 compared to 1989, the 1989 World Series (which aired on ABC) was interrupted for 10 days by the Loma Prieta earthquake. All in all, the 1989 World Series was at the time, the lowest rated World Series ever. More to the point, the ratings for the 1990 World Series on CBS were significantly lower than any World Series between 1982 and 1988.

Although the 1990 NLCS lasted six games, that year's ALCS and more importantly, the World Series, lasted only four out of seven possible games. To put things into proper perspective, by one estimate, CBS lost $5 million for each playoff game not played and US$15.4 million for each World Series game not played. At the end of the day, CBS lost $12 million to $15 million on each of the League Championship Series and World Series games not played, for a total of $36 million to $45 million.

=== 1991 ===
After sustaining huge losses (CBS claimed to have lost about $55 million in after-taxes revenue in 1990, which would go up to $170 million at the end of its four-year contract) from 1990's abbreviated postseason (which ended with the Cincinnati Reds shockingly sweeping the defending World Champion Oakland Athletics in the World Series), CBS made several notable adjustments for 1991. Regular season telecasts were reduced to a meager handful. In return, pregame shows during the League Championship Series were eliminated, to minimize the ratings damage.

For CBS' coverage of the 1991 All-Star Game from Toronto, CBS started their broadcast at the top of the hour with the customary pregame coverage. And then, because American President George H.W. Bush and Canadian Prime Minister Brian Mulroney were throwing out the first ball, there was a slight delay from the 8:30 p.m. EDT start. The game eventually started about 15–20 minutes late. Presumably this, along with CBS' low ratings for baseball, and the costs of doing pregame coverage, led to them starting the prime time broadcasts at 8:30 for the final two years of the contract, with little or no pregame content.

The 1991 season was perhaps most noteworthy for CBS having the opportunity to cover the World Series between the Minnesota Twins and Atlanta Braves. The seven-game affair between Minnesota and Atlanta earned CBS the highest ratings for a World Series since the 1986 World Series between the New York Mets and Boston Red Sox on NBC.

Earlier in the postseason, CBS' coverage of the ALCS meant that they could not carry the live testimony of Clarence Thomas, whose confirmation to the United States Supreme Court was put into question because of charges of sexual harassment from former staffer Anita Hill. Meanwhile, ABC, NBC, CNN and PBS all carried the testimony.

As previously mentioned, as CBS' baseball coverage progressed, the network dropped its 8:00 p.m. pregame coverage (in favor of airing sitcoms such as Evening Shade), before finally starting their coverage at 8:30 p.m. Eastern Time. The first pitch would generally arrive at approximately 8:45 p.m. Perhaps as a result, Joe Carter's World Series clinching home run off Mitch Williams in 1993, occurred at 12:00 a.m. on the East Coast.

After two years of calling baseball telecasts for CBS, Jack Buck was dismissed in December 1991. According to the radio veteran Buck, he had a hard time adjusting to the demands of a more constricting television production. CBS felt that Buck should have done more to make himself appear to be a set-up man for lead analyst Tim McCarver. Jack Buck's son Joe tried to rationalize his father's on-air problems by saying "My dad was brought up in the golden age of radio, I think he had his hands tied somewhat, being accustomed to the freedom of radio. I'm more used to acquiescing to what the producer wants to do, what the director wants to do."

Buck himself sized up CBS' handling of the announcers by saying "CBS never got that baseball play-by-play draws word-pictures. All they knew was that football stars analysts. So they said, 'Let [analyst Tim] McCarver run the show.' In television, all they want you to do is shut up. I'm not very good at shutting up." Buck though, would add that although he knew Tim McCarver well, they never developed a good relationship with each other on the air despite high hopes to the contrary. Phil Mushnick added insult to injury to Buck by accusing him of "trying to predict plays, as if to prove he was still on top."

My biggest problem was understanding my role. They wanted him to dominate the broadcast and have me be the mechanic and stay out of the way. I didn't want to broadcast that way. I guess I should have accepted it, but relying on my experience on GrandStand (NBC's NFL pregame show that Buck hosted in 1975) when I had not challenged anyone, I couldn't let others make all the decisions that put me in a position where I couldn't perform at all.

— Jack Buck in his autobiography That's a Winner.

Buck also got into deep trouble with CBS executives (namely executive producer Ted Shaker) over questionable comments made towards singer Bobby Vinton in 1990. While on-air prior to Game 4 of that year's NLCS in Pittsburgh, Buck criticized Vinton's off-key rendition of "The Star-Spangled Banner", making a comment towards Vinton that sounded like a prejudicial remark centered on his Polish heritage. Joe Buck believed that the situation was ironic because his father was "trying to help the guy." Buck began receiving death threats from Pirate fans and discovered a footprint on his pillow once he returned to his hotel room.

=== 1992 ===
Jack Buck's replacement was Boston Red Sox announcer Sean McDonough. Ted Shaker called McDonough about his interests for the top announcing job, and after McDonough hung up the telephone, he claimed that he did not want to "act like a 10-year-old" but he "jumped so high that he put a hole in his ceiling." McDonough, who was 30 years old at the time, became the youngest full-time network announcer to call a World Series when he called that year's Fall Classic alongside McCarver.

For CBS' coverage of the 1992 All-Star Game, they introduced Basecam, a lipstick-size camera, inside first base. The 1992 All-Star Game on CBS was also interrupted with coverage of the Democratic National Convention.

Over the course of Game 2 of the 1992 ALCS, Jim Kaat was stricken with a bad case of laryngitis. As a result, Johnny Bench had to come over from the CBS Radio booth and finish the game with Dick Stockton as a "relief analyst." There was talk that if Kaat's laryngitis did not get better, Don Drysdale was going to replace Kaat on television for Game 3, while Bench would continue to work on CBS Radio.

Tim McCarver ran afoul of Atlanta Braves outfielder Deion Sanders during the 1992 postseason, when he made comments on-air criticizing Sanders for his two-sport athletic career; Sanders was playing for both the Braves and the NFL's Atlanta Falcons at the time and participated in both the baseball postseason and the early NFL regular season for the first time in 1992 (Sanders was unable to do this in 1991, as his NFL contract with the Falcons would not allow him to). Sanders retaliated following Game 7 of the NLCS by dumping a bucket of ice water on McCarver (who was wired for sound and feared electrocution).

McCarver was not immune to criticism from outside sources, either, as Norman Chad wrote a critique of him in Sports Illustrated during the postseason. Chad said that McCarver was someone who "when you ask him the time, will tell you how a watch works", a reference to McCarver's perceived tendency to overanalyze things. Chad went further by saying "What's the difference between Tim McCarver and appendicitis? Appendicitis is covered by most health plans."

McCarver was also known to make gaffes from time to time. One of his more amusing miscues came during the 1992 National League Championship Series when he repeatedly referred to Pittsburgh Pirates pitcher Tim Wakefield as "Bill Wakefield." He finally explained that Bill Wakefield was one of his old minor-league teammates, and he laughed at himself because "I forgot my own name!" The year prior, during Game 6 of the World Series, McCarver's broadcast colleague, Jack Buck talked about Atlanta third baseman Terry Pendleton, who hit .367 in the series. Buck said, "TP. That's what his teammates call him." A few seconds later, McCarver rather oddly added, "TP. An appropriate name for someone who plays on the Braves."

During the 1992 postseason, CBS missed covering one of the three debates among U.S. presidential candidates George H.W. Bush, Bill Clinton and H. Ross Perot. The network had planned to join other broadcast and cable networks in the telecast; however, Game 4 of the ALCS between the Toronto Blue Jays and Oakland Athletics did not end until 8:30 p.m. Eastern Time, about the time the debate ended. The Blue Jays won the game 7–6 in 11 innings. The other networks reported very good ratings for the debate, part of one of the more compelling election campaigns in recent times.

=== 1993 ===
Lesley Visser missed the first half of the 1993 season due to injuries earlier suffered in a bizarre jogging accident in New York City's Central Park. Visser broke her hip and skidded face-first across the pavement, requiring reconstructive plastic surgery on her face and more than a decade later required an artificial hip replacement. She missed the Major League Baseball All-Star Game. Jim Kaat would replace her while she recuperated. Jim Gray also served as a reporter for the All-Star Game and World Series.

For 1993, CBS made a broadcast booth change by removing Dick Stockton from his role as secondary play-by-play announcer after three seasons, and replacing him with Greg Gumbel. As previously mentioned, also during the 1993 season, Andrea Joyce replaced Gumbel as studio host. Joyce would be joined at the anchor desk by Pat O'Brien. At the 1993 World Series, she became the first woman to co-host the network television coverage for a World Series. Sean McDonough filled in for O'Brien, who was suffering from laryngitis, as the pregame host for Game 6 of the 1993 National League Championship Series. Game 6 of the NLCS by the way, didn't have its first pitch until nearly 8:50 p.m. EST so that CBS could run 60 Minutes in its entirety.

On August 3, 1993, Gayle Gardner became the first woman to do television play-by-play for a Major League Baseball game. It was the Colorado Rockies vs. Cincinnati Reds on KWGN-TV in Denver.

During CBS' coverage of the World Series, umpires were upset with the overhead replays being televised by CBS. Dave Phillips, the crew chief, said just prior to Game 2 that the umpires want "CBS to be fair with their approach." Rick Gentile, senior vice president for production for CBS Sports, said that Richie Phillips, the lawyer for the Major League Umpires Association, tried to call the broadcast booth during Saturday's game, but the call was not put through. Richie Phillips apparently was upset when Dave Phillips called the Philadelphia Phillies' Ricky Jordan out on strikes in the fourth inning, and a replay showed the pitch to be about 6 inches outside. National League President Bill White, while using a CBS headset in the broadcast booth during Game 1, was overheard telling Gentile and the producer Bob Dekas, "You guys keep using that camera the way you want. Don't let Phillips intimidate you."

The final Major League Baseball game that CBS has televised to date was Game 6 of the 1993 World Series on October 23. Before Major League Baseball decided to seek the services of other networks, CBS offered US$120 million in annual rights fees over a two-year period, as well as advertising revenues in excess of $150 million a season.

You know as Tony Kubek once said about Mickey Mantle "Just as he was learning to say hello, he was saying goodbye!" This is kind of the way we feel here at CBS Sports. It doesn't seem possible that our four years as the caretaker of the "National Pastime" are over, but here we are...saying goodbye. And in that short time, not only did we have probably one of the greatest World Series ever between Atlanta and Minnesota, the seven gamer, we had also had arguably, one of the greatest World Series games the other night. And folks, how about this one tonight!? In all, and you're looking at them now, a lot of memories...a lot of good memories! And we hoped that you cherish these pictures and these sounds as much as we enjoyed bringing them right into your homes. Time to say goodbye, but knowing full well...that the grand ol' game will never say goodbye! It's just keeps rolling up...the memories! For all of us here at CBS Sports, I'm Pat O'Brien, thank you...for watching and...goodnight everybody!

— Host Pat O'Brien at the conclusion of CBS' coverage of the Game 6 of 1993 World Series and its four-year-long coverage of Major League Baseball as a whole.

=== 1994 ===
In 1994, ESPN renewed its baseball contract for six years (through the 1999 season). The new deal was worth $42.5 million per year and $255 million overall. The deal was ultimately voided after the 1995 season and ESPN was pretty much forced to restructure their contract.

After the fall-out from CBS's financial problems from their exclusive, four-year-long, US$1.8 billion television contract with Major League Baseball (a contract that ultimately cost the network approximately $500 million), Major League Baseball decided to go into the business of producing the telecasts themselves and market these to advertisers on its own. In reaction to the failed trial with CBS, Major League Baseball was desperately grasping for every available dollar. To put things into proper perspective, in 1991, the second year of the league's contract with the network, CBS reported a loss of around $169 million in the third quarter of the year. A decline in advertiser interest caused revenue from the sale of commercials during CBS's baseball telecasts to plummet. All the while, CBS was still contractually obligated to pay Major League Baseball around $260 million a year through 1993. Before Major League Baseball decided to seek the services of other networks, CBS offered US$120 million in annual rights fees over a two-year period, as well as advertising revenues in excess of $150 million a season.

As part of MLB's attempt to produce and market the games in-house, it hoped to provide games of regional interests to appropriate markets. Major League Baseball in the process, hoped to offer important games for divisional races to the overall market. Owners also hoped that this particular technique, combined with the additional division races created through league expansion (the Colorado Rockies and Florida Marlins had begun play the year prior) and the quest for wild card spots for the playoffs (1994 was the first year of three divisions for each league) would increase the national broadcast revenue for Major League Baseball in the foreseeable future.

After a four-year hiatus, ABC and NBC (who last aired Thursday Night Baseball games and the Saturday afternoon Game of the Week respectively) returned to Major League Baseball under the umbrella of a revenue-sharing venture called The Baseball Network. Under a six-year plan (with an option for two additional years), Major League Baseball was intended to receive 85% of the first US$140 million in advertising revenue (or 87.5% of advertising revenues and corporate sponsorship from the games until sales topped a specified level), 50% of the next $30 million, and 80% of any additional money. Prior to this, Major League Baseball was projected to take a projected 55% cut in rights fees and receive a typical rights fee from the networks. When compared to the previous television deal with CBS, The Baseball Network was supposed to bring in 50% less of the broadcasting revenue. The advertisers were reportedly excited about the arrangement with The Baseball Network because the new package included several changes intended to boost ratings, especially among younger viewers.

Arranging broadcasts through The Baseball Network seemed, on the surface, to benefit NBC and ABC (who each contributed $10 million in start-up funds) since it gave them a monopoly on broadcasting Major League Baseball games. The deal was similar to a time-buy, instead of a traditional rights fee situation. It also stood to benefit the networks because they reduced the risk associated with purchasing the broadcast rights outright (in stark contrast to CBS's disastrous contract with Major League Baseball from the 1990–1993 seasons). NBC and ABC were to create a loss-free environment for each other and keep an emerging Fox, which had recently made an aggressive and ultimately successful $1.58 billion bid for the television rights for National Football Conference games (thus, becoming a major player in the sports broadcasting game in the process), at bay. As a result of Fox's NFL gain, CBS was weakened further by affiliate changes, as a number of stations jumped to Fox from CBS (for example, in Detroit, WWJ-TV replaced WJBK).

The Baseball Network kicked off its coverage on July 12, 1994, on NBC with the All-Star Game from Three Rivers Stadium in Pittsburgh. The NBC broadcast team consisted of Bob Costas on play-by-play, with Joe Morgan and Bob Uecker as analysts. Costas, a veteran presence at NBC, had been the network's secondary baseball play-by-play announcer behind Vin Scully during the 1980s. Morgan, who was also working for ESPN at the time, had spent two years at NBC in the mid-1980s and two years at ABC from 1988 to 1989. Uecker, the longtime voice of the Milwaukee Brewers, returned to national television for the first time since he worked for ABC in the 1970s and early 1980s.

Greg Gumbel hosted the pre game show; this was one of his first assignments for NBC after having left CBS Sports following the 1994 College World Series. Helping with interviews were Hannah Storm and Johnny Bench. The 1994 All-Star Game reportedly sold out all its advertising slots. This was considered an impressive financial accomplishment, given that one 30-second spot cost US$300,000.

The '94 All-Star game also was broadcast in Spanish on NBC's Secondary Audio Program. Boston Red Sox announcer Hector Martinez and seven time All-Star Tony Pérez were the announcers for the occasion.

ABC, meanwhile, was able to have its primary broadcast team from 1989 return intact. Al Michaels served as the play-by-play announcer once again. Tim McCarver, who had just spent four years at CBS, returned as an analyst along with Jim Palmer. On the subject of Michaels returning to baseball for the first time since the infamous Loma Prieta earthquake interrupted the 1989 World Series, Jim Palmer said, "Here Al is, having done five games since 1989, and steps right in. It's hard to comprehend how one guy could so amaze."

After the All-Star Game was complete, ABC took over coverage with what was to be their weekly slate of games. ABC was scheduled to televise six regular season games on Saturdays or Mondays in prime time. NBC would then pick up where ABC left off by televising six more regular season Friday night games. Every Baseball Night in America game was scheduled to begin at 8:00 p.m. Eastern Time (or 8:00 p.m. Pacific Time if the game occurred on the West Coast). A single starting time gave the networks the opportunity to broadcast one game and then, simultaneously, cut to another game when there was a break in action.

The networks had exclusive rights for the twelve regular season dates, in that no regional or national cable service (such as ESPN or superstations like Chicago's WGN-TV or Atlanta's WTBS) or over-the-air broadcaster was allowed to telecast a Major League Baseball game on those dates. Baseball Night in America (which premiered on July 16, 1994) usually aired up to fourteen games based on the viewers' region (affiliates chose games of local interest to carry) as opposed to a traditional coast-to-coast format. Normally, announcers who represented each of the teams playing in the respective games were paired with each other. More specifically, on regional Saturday night broadcasts and all non-"national" broadcasts, TBN let the two lead announcers from the opposing teams call the games involving their teams together.

Games involving either of the two Canadian-based MLB teams at the time, the Toronto Blue Jays and Montreal Expos, were not always included in the Baseball Night in America package. Canadian rightsholders were allowed to broadcast the games. When TSN (which owned the cable rights to the Blue Jays and Expos) covered the games in Canada, they re-broadcast the BNIA feed across their network. Typically, if the Blue Jays were idle for the day, the Expos would be featured on TSN. Also, CBET (the CBC affiliate in Windsor, Ontario) would air Blue Jays games if the Detroit Tigers were not playing at home that night or if the Blue Jays were scheduled to play in Detroit. Whether or not the game would air in the opposing team's market would depend on which time zone they were from, or if they shared a market with another team.

In even-numbered years, NBC would have the rights to the All-Star Game and both League Championship Series while ABC would have the World Series and newly created Division Series. In odd-numbered years, the postseason and All-Star Game television rights were supposed to alternate. When ABC and NBC last covered baseball together from 1976 to 1989, ABC had the rights to the World Series in odd-numbered years while NBC would cover the All-Star Game and both League Championship Series in said years. Likewise, this process would alternate in even numbered years, with ABC getting the All-Star Game and both LCS in years that NBC had the World Series.

The long-term plans for The Baseball Network began to crumble after players and owners went on strike on August 12, 1994. In addition to the cancellation of that year's World Series, ABC was denied its remaining Baseball Night in America telecasts and NBC was shut out of its game broadcast slate (which in 1994, was scheduled to begin on August 26) altogether. Both networks elected to dissolve the partnership with Major League Baseball on June 22, 1995. Both networks figured that as the delayed 1995 baseball season opened without a labor agreement, there was no guarantee against another strike. It should also be noted that under the terms of the agreement, it could be voided by any party if the venture did not produce a minimum of $330 million in revenue over the first two years.

Shortly after the start of the strike, Stanford University's Roger Noll argued that the Baseball Network deal (and the bargain-basement ESPN cable renewal, which went from $100 million to $42 million because of their losses) reflected "poor business judgment on the part of management about the long-run attractiveness of their product to national broadcasters." He added that the $140 million that owners expected to share for the 1994 season (before the strike) from TBN was underestimated by "one-third to one-half" and fell below the annual average of $165 million needed to renew the TBN deal after two years. Meanwhile, Andy Zimbalist, author of Baseball and Billions, and a players' union consulting economist, insisted that baseball could have done better than the TBN deal with some combination of CBS (which offered $120 million last-ditch bid for renewal), Fox and TBS. Baseball shut out CBS and could have waited longer before closing them out."

=== 1995 ===
In 1995, ESPN broadcast the American League West tie-breaker game between the Seattle Mariners and California Angels with Jon Miller and Joe Morgan making the call.

The networks also promised not to begin any World Series weekend broadcasts after 7:20 p.m. Eastern Time. When CBS held the television rights, postseason games routinely aired on the East Coast at 8:30 p.m. at the earliest. This meant that Joe Carter's dramatic World Series clinching home run in 1993 occurred after midnight in the East. As CBS' baseball coverage progressed, the network dropped the 8:00 p.m. pregame coverage (in favor of airing sitcoms such as Evening Shade) before finally starting its coverage at 8:30 p.m. Eastern Time. The first pitch would generally arrive at approximately 8:45 p.m.

ABC won the rights to the first dibs at the World Series in August 1993 after ABC Sports president Dennis Swanson won a coin toss by calling "heads." Ken Schanzer, who was the CEO of The Baseball Network, handled the coin toss. Schanzer agreed to the coin toss by ABC and NBC at the outset as the means of determining the order in which they would divide up the playoffs.

What separated The Baseball Network from previous television deals with Major League Baseball, and was by far the most controversial part of the deal, was that not all postseason games (aside from the World Series) were guaranteed to be shown nationally. To increase viewership by preventing games from being played in the afternoon (the league was the only professional sports league in the country to play postseason games during the afternoon), the National League and American League's division and championship series games were instead played simultaneously in primetime, and affiliates could only air one game each night, which were again determined regionally. If one playoff series had already concluded, the remaining games would be aired nationally. Despite the frustration of not being able to see both League Championship Series on a national level, the 1995 LCS averaged a 13.1 rating.

A major problem with Baseball Night in America was the idea that viewers could not watch "important" games. Marty Noble put it in perspective by saying "With the Network determining when games will begin and which games are made available to which TV markets, Major League Baseball can conduct parts of its pennant races in relative secrecy." What added to the troubles of The Baseball Network was the fact that Baseball Night in America held exclusivity over every market. This most severely impacted markets with two teams, specifically New York City (Mets and Yankees), the Greater Los Angeles Area (Dodgers and Angels), Chicago (Cubs and White Sox), the San Francisco Bay Area (Giants and A's), and even Texas (Astros and Rangers). For example, if Baseball Night in America showed a Yankees game, this meant that nobody in New York could see that night's Mets game and vice versa.

Things got so bad for The Baseball Network that even local broadcasters objected to its operations. KSMO-TV in Kansas City, the primary over-the-air station for the Kansas City Royals, went as far as to sue the Royals for breach of contract resulting from their broadcasts being "overexposed" and violating its territorial exclusivity. Worse yet, even if a market had only one team, the ABC or NBC affiliate could still not broadcast that team's game if the start time was not appropriate for the time zone. For example, if the Detroit Tigers (the only team in their market) played a road game in Seattle, Oakland or Anaheim beginning at 8:00 p.m. Pacific Time (a late game), Detroit's Baseball Network affiliate (either WXYZ-TV or WDIV, depending on the network which held the rights to the game) could not air the game because the start time was too late for the Detroit area (11:00 p.m. Eastern Time). Detroit viewers only had the option of viewing the early game of the night.

Sports Illustrated columnist Tom Verducci for one, was very harsh on The Baseball Network, dubbing it both "America's regional pastime" and an "abomination." ABC Sports president Dennis Swanson, in announcing the dissolution of The Baseball Network, said "The fact of the matter is, Major League Baseball seems incapable at this point in time, of living with any long term relationships, whether it's with fans, with players, with the political community in Washington, with the advertising community here in Manhattan, or with its TV partners."

Five years after The Baseball Network dissolved, NBC Sports play-by-play announcer Bob Costas wrote in his book Fair Ball: A Fan's Case for Baseball that The Baseball Network was "stupid and an abomination." Costas further wrote that the agreement involving the World Series being the only instance of The Baseball Network broadcasting a nationally televised game was an unprecedented surrender of prestige, as well as a slap to all serious fans. He believed that The Baseball Network fundamentally corrupted the game and acknowledged that the most impassioned fans in baseball were now prevented from watching many of the playoff games that they wanted to see, as all playoff games had been broadcast nationally for decades. Costas added that both the divisional series and the League Championship Series now merited scarcely higher priority than regional coverage provided for a Big Ten football game between Wisconsin and Michigan.

According to Curt Smith's book, The Voice – Mel Allen's Untold Story, the longtime New York Yankees broadcaster and This Week in Baseball host was quoted as saying "You wonder how anything would be worse [than CBS]. What kind of show cancels a twenty-six-week-season's first fourteen weeks?" (in response to TBN's tagline, "Welcome to the Show").

During the 1995 Division Series, the fan frustration with The Baseball Network was so bad that the mere mention of it during the Mariners–Yankees ALDS from public address announcer Tom Hutyler at Seattle's Kingdome brought boos from most of the crowd. To further put things into perspective, 55% of the country was able to get the American League Championship Series (Cleveland-Seattle) while 45% got the National League Championship Series (Atlanta-Cincinnati) for at least the first two games on ABC.

The Baseball Network's contract stipulated that negotiations could only take place with NBC and ABC for 45 days, starting on August 15, 1995. But with NBC and ABC's refusal to continue after the 1995 season, baseball had to look at its future options. In October 1995, when it was a known fact that ABC and NBC were going to end their television deal/joint venture with Major League Baseball, preliminary talks rose about CBS returning. It was rumored that CBS would show Thursday night games (more specifically, a package of West Coast interleague games scheduled for the 11:30 Eastern/8:30 Pacific Time slot) while Fox would show Saturday afternoon games. CBS and Fox were also rumored to share rights to the postseason. In the end however, CBS's involvement did not come to pass and NBC became Fox's over-the-air national television partner. Whereas each team earned about $14 million in 1990 under CBS the later television agreement with NBC and Fox beginning in 1996 earned each team about $6.8 million.

To salvage the remains of the partnership, ABC and NBC elected to share coverage of the 1995 postseason including the World Series. ABC wound up broadcasting Games 1, 4, and 5 of 1995 World Series while NBC would broadcast Games 2, 3, and 6 (which turned out to be the decisive game). Had the 1995 World Series gone to a seventh game, it would have then been broadcast by ABC. As it stands, Game 5 of the 1995 World Series is to date, the final Major League Baseball game to be broadcast on ABC.

During the 1995 World Series, NBC's Hannah Storm was the first woman to serve as solo host of a World Series, and the first to preside over a World Series trophy presentation.

Others would argue that a primary reason for its failure was its abandoning of localized markets in favor of more lucrative and stable advertising contracts afforded by turning to a national model of broadcasting, similar to the National Football League's television package, which focuses on localized games, with one or two "national" games.

In the end, the venture would lose US$95 million in advertising and nearly $500 million in national and local spending. The Baseball Network generated only about $5.5 million per team in revenue for each of the two years that it operated. To put things into proper perspective, in 1993 alone, CBS generated about $14.7 million per team. Much of this could possibly be traced back to the strike causing a huge drop in revenue, which in return caused baseball salaries to decrease by approximately $140,000 on average in 1995.

Both ABC and NBC soon publicly vowed to cut all ties with Major League Baseball for the remainder of the 20th century, and Fox signed on to be the exclusive network carrier of Major League Baseball regular season games in 1996. However, NBC kept a postseason-only (with the exception of even-numbered years when NBC had the rights to the All-Star Game) deal in the end, signing a deal to carry three Division Series games, one half of the League Championship Series (the ALCS in even numbered years and the NLCS in odd numbered years; Fox would televise the other LCS in said years), and the 1997 and 1999 World Series respectively (Fox had exclusive rights to the 1996, 1998 and 2000 World Series). Beginning in 2001, Fox would become the exclusive broadcast network for the World Series.

=== 1996 ===
In 1996, ESPN began a five-year contract with Major League Baseball worth $440 million and about $80 million per year. ESPN paid for the rights to a Wednesday night doubleheader and Sunday Night Baseball, as well as Opening Day and holiday telecasts and all postseason games not aired on Fox or NBC. Major League Baseball staggered the times of first-round games to provide a full-day feast for viewers: ESPN could air games at 1 p.m., 4 p.m., and 11 p.m. EDT, with the broadcast networks telecasting the prime time game.

On November 7, 1995, Major League Baseball reached a television deal with Fox and NBC, allowing the former to obtain MLB game rights (assuming ABC's end of the contract). Fox paid $575 million for the five-year contract, a fraction less of the amount of money that CBS had paid for the Major League Baseball television rights for the 1990–1993 seasons.

Unlike the previous television deal, "The Baseball Network" (a partnership created through the league's joint contract with ABC and NBC that began in the 1994 season), Fox reverted to the format of televising regular season games (approximately 16 weekly telecasts that normally began on Memorial Day weekend) on Saturday afternoons. Fox did, however, continue a format that The Baseball Network started by offering a selection of games based purely on a viewer's region. Fox's approach has usually been to offer three regionalized telecasts. The initial deal also gave Fox the rights to broadcast the 1996, 1998 and 2000 World Series, the 1997 and 1999 All-Star Games, as well as coverage of the League Championship Series (shared with NBC) and five Division Series games each year.

When Fox first began carrying baseball, it used the motto "Same game, new attitude." to promote the telecasts, which had previously been used to promote the network's National Football League coverage when it began in 1994. Fox's primary goal when it first began airing Major League Baseball games was to promote their weak prime time schedule (which at the time included only a handful of hits, such as established series Beverly Hills 90210, The Simpsons and Married... with Children). Fox Sports president Ed Goren said, "We'll use the World Series and League Championship Series to spur our shows". Like its predecessor NBC, Fox determined its Saturday schedule by which MLB franchise was playing a team from one of the three largest television markets – New York City, Los Angeles or Chicago. If there was a game which featured teams from two of these three markets (involving any combination of the Yankees, Mets, Dodgers, Angels, Cubs or White Sox), that game would be aired on the network.

For its first year of coverage in 1996, Fox used the scoring bug on their Major League Baseball telecasts. Within two years, the bug would be expanded to all sports telecasts on Fox and other networks. The first scoring bug was a translucent parallelogram with red borders on the left and right. The Fox logo and inning were on the left side, with the score on the right side. The count and number of outs were underneath. A diamond would be displayed around the bug only when runners were on base. An occupied base was represented by a red dot.

As previously mentioned, despite the failure of The Baseball Network, NBC decided to retain its relationship with Major League Baseball, but on a far more restricted basis. Under the five-year deal signed on November 7, 1995 (running from the 1996 to 2000 seasons) for a total of approximately $400 million, NBC did not televise any regular season games. Instead, NBC only handled the All-Star Game, three Division Series games (on Tuesday, Friday and Saturday nights), and the American League Championship Series in even-numbered years and the World Series, three Division Series games (also on Tuesday, Friday and Saturday nights) and the National League Championship Series in odd-numbered years. Fox, which assumed ABC's portion of the league broadcast television rights, gained the rights to the Saturday Game of the Week during the regular season, in addition to alternating rights to the All-Star Game, League Championship Series (the ALCS in odd-numbered years and the NLCS in even-numbered years), Division Series and the World Series.

From 1996-2000, NBC aired LDS games on Tuesday/Friday/Saturday nights. Fox aired LDS games on Wednesday/Thursday nights, Saturdays in the late afternoon, plus Sunday/Monday nights (if necessary). Meanwhile, ESPN carried many afternoon LDS contests. At this point, all playoff games were nationally televised (mostly in unopposed timeslots).

Also around this particular period, NBC adapted composer Randy Edelman's theme from the short-lived Fox series The Adventures of Brisco County, Jr. as the main theme music for its baseball telecasts. However, NBC used Edelman's "Emotions Run High" from the film The Big Green as the theme for the network's coverage of the 1996 All-Star Game.

From 1996 to 2002, and since 2010–2014, MLB International broadcasts the League Championship Series alternately, with the American League Championship Series in even-numbered years and the National League Championship Series in odd-numbered years.

All World Series games from 1981 to 1996 were televised in Canada on CTV, using the feed from the US network broadcaster.

The Atlanta Braves became the first Major League Baseball team to appear in World Series broadcast on all four major networks (NBC in 1957–58 and 1995, ABC in 1995, CBS in 1991–92 and Fox in 1996. The Philadelphia Phillies have since duplicated this feat (NBC in 1950 and 1980, ABC in 1983, CBS in 1993 and Fox in 2008–09).

For Game 2 of the 1996 World Series (rescheduled to Monday night due to a rainout), Fox used an early start (7 p.m. Eastern Time) to minimize the overlap with Monday Night Football on ABC.

=== 1997 ===
On July 8, 1997, Fox televised its first ever All-Star Game (out of Jacobs Field in Cleveland). For this particular game, Fox introduced "Catcher-Cam" in which a camera was affixed to the catchers' masks in order to provide unique perspectives of the action around home plate. Catcher-Cam soon would become a regular fixture on Fox's baseball broadcasts.

Also in 1997, just before the start of NBC's coverage of the World Series, Don Ohlmeyer, president of the network's West Coast entertainment division and former executive producer for NBC Sports, came under fire after publicly announcing that he hoped that the World Series would end in a four-game sweep. Ohlmeyer believed that baseball now lacked broad audience appeal (especially in the aftermath of the 1994–95 Major League Baseball strike). As opposed to teams from the three largest television markets (New York City, Los Angeles and Chicago) in the United States, the 1997 World Series featured the matchup of the upstart Florida Marlins and the Cleveland Indians, which made their second World Series appearance in three years. In addition, Ohlmeyer feared that the World Series would disrupt NBC's efforts to attract enough viewers for its new fall roster in order to stay on top of the ratings heap. Ohlmeyer said "If the A&E channel called, I'd take the call." Game 5 fell on a Thursday, which had long been the highest rated night on NBC's schedule, if not on all of television.

Game 7 of the 1997 World Series caused a scheduled Chicago Bears–Miami Dolphins game to be postponed to Monday night. It was seen on ABC in the Chicago and Miami markets, and was intended to air on Fox. The rest of the nation received the scheduled Green Bay Packers–New England Patriots game, the only time a rematch of a previous season's Super Bowl aired on ABC.

=== 1998 ===
Fox's scoring bug was slightly modified in 1998. The layout remained the same but it now was a square. The teams and scores also now had a white background, with a red arrow indicating which team was at bat. Occupied bases were now represented by a yellow triangle. Also beginning in 1998, pitch speed began to briefly cover the count and outs area after a pitch was thrown.

In 1998, Bob Uecker abruptly left NBC Sports before a chance to call the All-Star Game from Coors Field in Colorado. Uecker underwent a back operation in which four discs were replaced. For the remainder of the contract (1998–2000), only Bob Costas and Joe Morgan called the games. Also in 1998, NBC's coverage of the ALCS was the highest rated for any League Championship Series since before the 1994 strike. NBC averaged a 9.4 rating for the six games, which was a 6% increase than the network's coverage of the 1997 NLCS in the same time slot. The rating was 13% more than Fox's ALCS coverage in 1997 and 12% more than NBC's coverage in 1996.

Also in 1998, ESPN broadcast the National League Wild Card tie-breaker game between the Chicago Cubs and San Francisco Giants. Jon Miller and Joe Morgan were on the call.

=== 1999 ===
In 1999, Fox unveiled a new scoring bug that was nearly identical to the NFL bug unveiled the previous fall. A permanent baserunner graphic (with a design that would be used through 2008) was on the left side of the bug and occupied bases would light up in yellow. The team scores were on a black background on the right side of the bug. A bar with the Fox logo and the inning (now with a standard up or down arrow to indicate top or bottom of the inning) extended from the top. A bar with the count and the number of outs extended from the bottom.

Also in 1999, Bob Costas teamed with his then-NBC colleague Joe Morgan to call two weekday night telecasts for ESPN. The first was on Wednesday, August 25 with Detroit Tigers playing against the Seattle Mariners. The second was on Tuesday, September 21 with the Atlanta Braves playing against the New York Mets.

ESPN also broadcast the National League Wild Card tie-breaker game (this time between the New York Mets and Cincinnati Reds) once again with Jon Miller and Joe Morgan once again on the call.

The 1999 World Series was NBC's 39th and, to date, final World Series telecast. Fox would air the next World Series as part of the contract in place, and acquired the exclusive broadcast rights of Major League Baseball beginning in 2001. With the Knicks having played in the NBA Finals in June, this was the second championship series in 1999 that NBC broadcast involving teams from New York. Bob Costas, Jim Gray, and Hannah Storm were involved both times. Costas with play-by-play, Gray as a reporter, and Storm as pre-game host. Prior to Cleveland in 2016, this was the most recent year of a same city hosting both NBA Finals and World Series in the same year.

During the World Series, NBC field reporter Jim Gray, who had previously covered Major League Baseball for CBS, came under fire for a confrontational interview with banned all-time hit king Pete Rose. Just prior to the start of Game 2 of the World Series, Gray pushed Rose – on hand (by permission of Commissioner Bud Selig) at Turner Field in Atlanta as a fan-selected member of MasterCard's All-Century Team – to admit to having wagered on baseball games as manager of the Cincinnati Reds ten years earlier. After NBC was flooded with tons of viewer complaints, Gray was forced to clarify his actions to the viewers at home prior to Game 3. Regardless of Gray's sincerity, Game 3 hero Chad Curtis of the New York Yankees boycotted Gray's request for an interview live on camera; Curtis had hit a game-winning home run to send the World Series 3–0 in the Yankees' favor. Curtis said to Gray, "Because of what happened with Pete, we decided not to say anything."

Despite the heavy criticism he received, Gray offered no apology for his line of questioning toward Rose:

I stand by it, and I think it was absolutely a proper line of questioning. I don't have an agenda against Pete Rose. Pete was the one who started asking me questions. I definitely wouldn't have gone (that) direction if he had backed off. My intent was to give Pete an opportunity to address issues that have kept him out of baseball. I thought he might have had a change of heart. He hadn't had an opening in 10 years.

Although Dick Ebersol (then-president of NBC Sports) and Keith Olbermann – among others – have maintained that Gray was simply doing his job, in 2004 Pete Rose would admit to betting on baseball (along with other sports) while he was the manager of the Cincinnati Reds.
