= Major League Baseball on television in the 2000s =

In September 2000, Major League Baseball signed a six-year, $2.5 billion contract with Fox to show Saturday baseball, the All-Star Game, selected Division Series games and exclusive coverage of both League Championship Series and the World Series.

Under the previous five-year deal with NBC (1996–2000), Fox paid $115 million while NBC only paid $80 million per year. Fox paid about $575 million overall while NBC paid about $400 million overall. The difference between the Fox and the NBC contracts implicitly values Fox's Saturday Game of the Week at less than $90 million for five years. Before NBC officially decided to part ways with Major League Baseball (for the second time in about 12 years) on September 26, 2000, Fox's payment would've been $345 million while NBC would've paid $240 million. Before 1990, NBC had carried Major League Baseball since 1947.

When asked about the new deal with Fox, Commissioner Bud Selig said, "We at Major League Baseball could not be happier with the result. They have been a good partner and an innovative producer of our games."

Neal Pilson, who served as the president of CBS Sports when the network had the exclusive television rights for Major League Baseball said of Fox's $2.5 billion deal:

It is a lot of baseball. It will force Fox to delay the start of its entertainment season every fall in order to cover the playoffs and the World Series, but I am sure they have taken that into account. Fox probably believes it has driven a good deal financially. It has kept its cost escalation at a very modest number. I'm sure Fox believes if it is the only national carrier, it can sell its commercial (slots) without having to face underpricing from a competitor.

Some observers believed that gaining the relative ratings boost from the League Championship Series and World Series meant more to Fox than the other broadcast networks. This was because Fox had suffered the biggest prime time ratings decline among the four major networks during the 1999–2000 television season, with an average prime time audience of 8.97 million viewers, down 17% from the year before according to Nielsen Media Research.

== Year-by-year breakdown ==
=== 2000 ===
For a Saturday afternoon telecast of a Los Angeles Dodgers/Chicago Cubs game at Wrigley Field on August 26, 2000, Fox aired a special "Turn Back the Clock" broadcast to commemorate the 61st anniversary of the first televised baseball game. The broadcast started with a recreation of the television technology of 1939, with play-by-play announcer Joe Buck working alone with a single microphone, a single black-and-white camera, and no graphics; each subsequent half-inning would then see the broadcast "jump ahead in time" to a later era, showing the evolving technologies and presentation of network baseball coverage through the years.

In 2000, NBC was caught in the dilemma of having to televise a first-round playoff game between the New York Yankees and Oakland Athletics over the first presidential debate between George W. Bush and Al Gore. NBC decided to give its local stations the option of carrying the debate or the baseball game. If an NBC affiliate decided to carry the debate, then the Pax TV affiliate in their local market could carry the game. NBC also placed a crawl at the bottom of the screen to inform viewers that they could see the debate on its sister channel MSNBC.

On the other end, Fox said that it would carry baseball on the two nights when its schedule conflicted with the presidential or vice presidential debates. NBC spokeswoman Barbara Levin said "We have a contract with Major League Baseball. The commission was informed well in advance of their selecting the debate dates. If we didn't have the baseball conflict we would be televising it." Although there has not been confirmation, anecdotal reports indicated that many NBC affiliates in swing states (such as Michigan, Ohio and Pennsylvania) chose to air the debate over the baseball game. This is an option that CBS affiliates did not have in 1992, when that network refused to break away from Game 4 of the American League Championship Series (which had gone into extra innings) to the first Clinton–Bush–Perot debate. Like NBC and Fox would do in 2000, CBS cited its contract with Major League Baseball.

During NBC's coverage of the 2000 Division Series between the New York Yankees and Oakland Athletics, regular play-by-play announcer Bob Costas decided to take a breather after anchoring NBC's prime time coverage of the Summer Olympic Games from Sydney. In Costas' place was Atlanta Braves announcer Skip Caray, who teamed with Joe Morgan before Costas' return for the ALCS. It wasn't just Costas but all of NBC's production crews who were down in Sydney. The Olympics ended just two or three days before the MLB playoffs started that year, so the TBS crew worked the Division Series games for NBC.

As previously mentioned, in September 2000, Major League Baseball signed a six-year, $2.5 billion contract with Fox to televise Saturday afternoon regular-season baseball games, the All-Star Game and coverage of the Division Series, League Championship Series and World Series. 90% of the contract's value to Fox, which was paying the league $417 million per year, came from the postseason, which not only attracted large audiences, but also provided an irreplaceable opportunity for the network to showcase its fall schedule. Under the previous five-year deal with NBC (running from 1996 to 2000), Fox paid $115 million ($575 million overall), compared to the $80 million ($400 million overall) that NBC paid. The difference between the Fox and the NBC contracts was that Fox's Saturday Game of the Week was implicitly valued at less than $90 million for five years. Before NBC officially decided to part ways with Major League Baseball (for the second time in about 12 years) on September 26, 2000, Fox's payment would have been $345 million, while NBC would have paid $240 million. NBC Sports president Ken Schanzer said regarding the loss of Major League Baseball rights for the second time since 1990:

We have notified Major League Baseball that we have passed on their offer and we wish them well going forward.

NBC Sports chairman Dick Ebersol added that it was not cost-effective for NBC to be paying out the kind of money that Major League Baseball wanted. The network was also reportedly concerned over disruptions to its regular fall prime time lineup that would result from having to broadcast the playoffs and World Series. In addition, NBC had several NASCAR races scheduled during the summer.

Ebersol further added:

We walked away from the N.F.L., because it was the right thing to do, and we stayed No. 1 in prime-time in all the important aspects. We walked away from baseball because it was the right thing to do and we don't have to take off our fall shows to show playoff games. The N.B.A. was asking us to lose hundreds of millions of dollars.

The last Major League Baseball game that NBC televised until 2022 was Game 6 of the 2000 American League Championship Series, occurring on October 17, 2000. In Houston, due to the coverage of the 2000 Presidential Debate, KPRC-TV elected to carry NBC News' coverage of the debate while independent station KNWS-TV carried the ALCS game via NBC.

=== 2001 ===
For the 2001 season, Fox implemented a new graphics package for its MLB telecasts, which debuted on the network's NASCAR broadcasts in February of that year. The graphics package was an updated version of the design in 1999, but its score bug was revised as a top-screen banner. A simple, transparent black rectangle with a shaded area above it spanned the top of the screen from left to right, displaying the diamond graphic representing the baseball diamond, and the abbreviations of both teams in white. The scores would be shown in yellow boxes next to the team abbreviations; the center showed the inning (a triangle was placed to the left of the inning number to show which half-inning it was: pointing up to represent the top of an inning and pointing down to represent the bottom of an inning), to the right was the number of outs, right of that was the pitch count and the pitch speed (the pitch speed was in the same location as the pitch count, and the pitch speed would appear be in a yellow box); and the MLB on Fox logo was placed on the far right. This banner, along with the shaded area above it, retracted from the top of the screen whenever it appeared or was removed.

For the 2000 and 2001 seasons, the Fox network's then-sister cable channel, Fox Family (later ABC Family, now Freeform) carried a weekly Major League Baseball game on Thursday nights (a game that had previously aired nationwide on Fox Sports Net from 1997 to 1999), as well as select postseason games from the Division Series. Among the noteworthy games that aired on Fox Family was the October 4, 2001 game between the San Francisco Giants and the Houston Astros, during which Barry Bonds hit his 70th home run of the season, which tied the all-time single season record that Mark McGwire had set only three years earlier (Bonds broke the record the next night).

Meanwhile, the Fox Broadcasting Company's other sister cable channel FX, aired numerous Saturday night Major League Baseball contests in 2001, including Cal Ripken Jr.'s final game at Camden Yards. FX also aired one game in the Major League Baseball postseason each year from 2001 to 2005, on the first Wednesday night of League Championship Series week when the league scheduled two games at the same time. On that night, Fox distributed one game to local affiliates with the availability of coverage being based on region, and the other game aired on the corresponding cable affiliate of FX, the main DirecTV or Dish Network channel, or an alternate channel on the satellite providers.

ESPN was on hand for the Cleveland Indians' historic comeback against the Seattle Mariners on August 5, 2001. The Indians trailed 14–2 after six innings, but scored twelve runs in the final three innings before winning in the bottom of the eleventh, 15–14. The twelve-run comeback tied the Major League record for largest deficit overcome in a game.

For the first year of its exclusive six-year contract (2001), Fox did a split telecast (which had not been attempted since the ill-fated "Baseball Network" arrangement existed) for the League Championship Series. This meant that two games were played simultaneously on the same night, with one game airing on the Fox network and the other on the regional Fox Sports Net cable channel (depending on market, as some markets did not have a regional sports network with a relationship to FSN). The rationale behind the split-telecast was that because of the September 11 attacks, the entire post-season schedule was delayed by a week. Because of this, two Sunday LCS games came in conflict with a Fox NFL doubleheader. Fans and sports journalists were unimpressed with the situation and MLB commissioner Bud Selig vowed that it was a one-time deal necessitated by circumstance. However, in later years, Fox used split telecasts on a few occasions to keep the playoffs "on schedule" and maximize its prime time advertising revenue, and aired the second game on FX, which has virtually nationwide distribution on cable and satellite. This ensured that Fox did not have to air an LCS game on a weekday afternoon, when many viewers are unable to watch. The 2007–2013 contract eliminated this issue, as TBS had rights to one of the League Championship Series each year. However, Fox continued to air afternoon LCS games on weekdays through the entire length of the contract.

=== 2002 ===
As part of its 2001 purchase of Fox Family, in addition to rights to the Thursday night game, The Walt Disney Company acquired the MLB rights that were also held by FX. Those two game packages were moved to ESPN beginning with the 2002 baseball season; however, the playoff games remained on ABC Family for one additional year due to contractual issues. A deal was reached to move those playoff games to ESPN, which produced the games for ABC Family, starting with the 2003 season. Although the games aired on networks owned by Disney, Fox kept the exclusive negotiation rights to renew the contract after the 2006 season. Fox chose not to renew its rights to the Division Series, which went to TBS as part of its new baseball contract.

On June 16, 2002, Sunday Night Baseball covered a Subway Series game at Shea Stadium in which Mo Vaughn hit a game winning three-run home run in the New York Mets' 3–2 win over the New York Yankees.

=== 2003 ===
In 2003, the Braves telecasts on TBS underwent significant changes for the first time in many years, reflecting an increase in the network's rights fee payments to Major League Baseball. In turn, national sponsors could fulfill their advertising commitments by purchasing ads on TBS, in addition to ESPN or Fox. In the process, Don Sutton and Joe Simpson assumed duties as lead commentators, while longtime play-by-play announcers Skip Caray and Pete Van Wieren had their participation on the broadcasts reduced. This was done in an attempt to combat criticism of Caray's on-air "home team" bias and to market its baseball coverage to fans of MLB teams other than the Braves. Meanwhile, the brand Braves Baseball on TBS was replaced by Major League Baseball on TBS. The move was strongly criticized by Braves fans, Atlanta area media outlets and Braves manager Bobby Cox. Over 90% of Braves fans who voted in an online poll conducted by the Atlanta Journal-Constitution preferred Caray and Van Wieren to the more neutral broadcasts. The move backfired, and ratings for the TBS broadcasts declined sharply. After that year's All-Star break, TBS brought back Caray and Van Wieren to work with the two analysts, while broadcasts reverted to the Braves Baseball on TBS brand the following year.

=== 2004 ===
On April 16, 2004, Fox aired a Friday night game between the New York Yankees and Boston Red Sox to cover those teams' first head-to-head meeting since the memorable 2003 ALCS.

Scooter debuted in the 2004 baseball season on April 16, during a game between the New York Yankees and Boston Red Sox. While Fox Sports television chairman David Hill called Scooter "really cute and really terrific", the character has garnered few positive reactions otherwise, with Sports Illustrated writer John Donovan warning "purists everywhere, grab the barf bag," and Sports Illustrated media writer Richard Deitsch using Scooter as an example of "how technology does not always help society." The Sporting News reported polling their staff with the question "What best summarizes your feelings for Scooter, Fox's talking baseball?": 45% of responders chose the answer "Send him to a slow, painful death." Despite most reactions, Scooter would still be used in televised baseball games until after the 2006 World Series.

Starting with the 2004 postseason, Fox's baseball broadcasts began using the same graphics package that debuted with NFL telecasts in 2003. The score banner was changed to match the layout adopted by the network's football coverage at the start of the 2004 season, but using the abbreviations of the teams playing instead of their logos. Team abbreviations were shown this time in electronic eggcrate lettering in the team's main color, the shaded area above the score banner was removed, and the scores were shown in white text in black parallelograms. Whenever team-specific information was displayed in the banner such as a scored run or an out, the abbreviation would morph into the team logo with the scored run being displayed; the team who would score a run would have its abbreviation morph into its logo and a "strobe light" would flash over the black parallelogram as the score changes. When a home run was displayed in the banner, a split "strobe light" would flash a few times across the banner with the words "HOME RUN (team)" in the team's color then zooming in to the center from both left and right angles, accompanied by two distorted electric buzzes followed by a futuristic computer sounder. This marked the first time that a home run was displayed in the banner. When it appeared, flashing lights spanning the top of the screen with two moving lines on top and bottom would join to morph into the banner; when first formed, the team logos were shown before changing into the abbreviations. When it was removed, the banner became just a quick beam of light spanning the top of the screen, which would disappear very quickly.

In October 2004, Fox started airing all Major League Baseball postseason broadcasts (including the League Championship Series and World Series) in high definition; Fox also started airing the Major League Baseball All-Star Game in HD that year. Prior to the 2008 season, one of the three regional games the network televises each Saturday was presented in HD. Since 2008, all MLB games televised by Fox – including Saturday regional games – are presented in high definition.

Dave O'Brien provided commentary for MLB International's coverage of the World Series from 2004 until 2009. O'Brien teamed with his usual ESPN partner Rick Sutcliffe on broadcasts of the World Series and the American League Championship Series for MLB International.

=== 2005 ===
While covering the 2005 Major League Baseball All-Star Game at Comerica Park in Detroit, host Jeanne Zelasko angered many fans for her treatment of legendary broadcaster Ernie Harwell. Many disliked the way Zelasko abruptly – and in many fans' eyes, awkwardly – cut Harwell off just 17 seconds into a pre-game interview, as Harwell was detailing the accomplishments of famous Tiger Al Kaline. Harwell later said he was not offended by Zelasko, and let the matter drop. In September 2008, Zelasko took heat for referring to the Tampa Bay Rays as the "Tampa Rays". Jeanne Zelasko has, in general, been accused of being too flippant, not particularly knowledgeable about the sport of baseball, and inserting too many corny cliches or plays on words during broadcasts.

OLN was briefly considering picking up the rights to the Sunday and Wednesday games, which expired after the 2005 season. On September 14, 2005, however, ESPN, then the current rights holder, signed an eight-year contract with Major League Baseball. The weekday afternoon "DayGame" telecasts that ESPN and ESPN2 had previously aired were eliminated in the new pact, along with the late (10 p.m. ET) Wednesday night game (although ESPN can elect to show a late game instead of an early one should it so desire), and the coverage of Memorial Day, Independence Day, and Labor Day games (except for games that fall under the regular Monday-night slot).

ESPN's Monday and Wednesday telecasts remain mostly nonexclusive, meaning the games also can be televised by each club's local broadcasters. In fact, Wednesday games are blacked out on ESPN unless a participating team's local broadcaster does not choose to televise the game. The Sunday games remain on ESPN only, and with ESPN losing the rights to Sunday Night Football telecasts, it looks likely that Sunday Night Baseball will run uninterrupted on ESPN throughout the season, except on Opening Night (when it will air on ESPN2, since it usually conflicts with the NCAA Women's Basketball Final Four).

Alternate telecasts for home-team markets which are blacked out have also been phased out, either in an effort to save costs or in an effort to allocate more satellite space for high-definition broadcasts on ESPNHD. Those who get ESPN via cable get ESPNEWS instead, and those who get the channel via satellite see a blank picture and a blackout notice.

MLB will receive, on average, $296 million a year under the new agreement, a television and a baseball official said, speaking on condition of anonymity because of a confidentiality agreement in the deal. ESPN will pay baseball $273.5 million in 2006, $293.5 million in each of the following four years, $308.5 million in 2011 and $306 million in each of the final two seasons.

During the 2005 World Series on Fox, a new white banner was introduced. This would resemble a chrome finish, and the team abbreviations became white letters in the team's main color; the next few years, the new banner was adopted for all games. This banner, unlike the 2001–2004 version, would not be removed for the final out of the World Series but was dropped at other critical points (like whenever Alex Rodriguez came to bat, tied with an April record 14 home runs, and when Barry Bonds had 753).

=== 2006 ===
Fox has used numerous scheduling formulas for its Saturday regular season coverage. These have often changed based on the rights granted by new television contracts, and the pregame programs that the network has chosen to air. From 1996 to 2006, Fox began its weekly game telecasts on the Saturday of Memorial Day weekend or the weekend before. The selection of games varied on a regional basis, and the start times were staggered based on region. A half-hour pregame show aired at 12:30 p.m. Eastern Time, followed by game broadcasts held at 1:00 p.m. in the Eastern and Central Time Zones. West Coast games did not air until 4:00 p.m. Eastern Time (1:00 p.m. in the Pacific Time Zone). All of these games were exclusive to the broadcast network, and as a result, Fox's exclusivity window lasted through the entire afternoon.

On July 11, 2006, Major League Baseball announced that the Fox network had signed a new seven-year contract, which guaranteed that Fox would remain the broadcaster of the World Series through the 2013 season. Fox had widely been expected to renew the deal, but it was unclear what the network would be willing to air beyond the All-Star Game and World Series.

After weeks of speculation and rumors, on July 11, 2006 at the All-Star Game, Major League baseball announced that Time Warner's TBS will gain rights to a Sunday afternoon Game of the Week beginning in the 2008 season. TBS will be allowed to choose the games that it will carry and may select a single team up to 13 times. TBS also will gain exclusive broadcast rights to the Division Series in both leagues starting in 2007, as well as any tiebreakers starting with the 2007 season. On October 18, 2006, Major League Baseball announced that TBS will also carry the other League Championship Series. (Through the 2006 season, ESPN had national broadcast rights to tiebreakers, and ESPN and Fox shared coverage of the Division Series, with ESPN covering the majority of the games, while Fox was guaranteed the 8:00 p.m. Eastern slot most nights.) TBS also gained the rights to the All-Star Game Selection Show, formerly on ESPN.

As part of the agreement, the network also announced that it will no longer cover the Atlanta Braves on an exclusive national basis after the 2007 season. Games will be subject to blackout in the teams' markets, but local broadcasters can still air the games. TBS would carry 70 Braves games in the 2007 season, in addition to the postseason package, but beginning in 2008 will only carry the Sunday game on a national basis.

However, WTBS (now WPCH-TV) could still carry up to 45 games within the Braves' six-state geographical area (Alabama, Georgia, Tennessee, North Carolina, South Carolina, and Mississippi). These games could conceivably air nationally as part of the MLB Extra Innings package.

The package with Fox was officially announced on October 17, 2006. Under the terms of the arrangement, Fox retained its rights to the network's regular-season package, which would now begin in April, and would remain the exclusive home of the All-Star Game and World Series. Fox's postseason coverage beyond the World Series is limited to one League Championship Series per year (the American League Championship Series in odd numbered years and National League Championship Series in even numbered years), which alternates every year with TBS (which took over exclusive rights to the Division Series from ESPN) airing the other LCS.

One of the terms of the deal was that, beginning with the 2007 season, the Saturday "Game of the Week" coverage was extended over the entire season rather than starting after Memorial Day, with most games being aired in the 3:30 to 7:00 p.m. (Eastern Time) time slot, which was reduced to 4:00 to 7:00 after Fox cancelled its in-studio pre-game program for the 2009 season. Exceptions were added in 2010 with a 3:00 to 7:00 afternoon window being used on Saturdays when Fox was scheduled to broadcast a NASCAR Cup Series race in prime time (which would start at 7:30) and a 7:00 to 10:00 window, when Fox is scheduled to broadcast the UEFA Champions League soccer final (which would start at 3:00).

As previously mentioned, after the 2006 Division Series, ESPN lost the rights to broadcast playoff games on TV. All postseason games, from possible one-game playoffs to the World Series, have aired on Fox Sports and TBS since 2007. Games remained on ESPN Radio. ESPN also lost rights to ESPN DayGame presented by Fruit of the Loom and Thursday Night Baseball powered by Castrol.

Because of the reduction of ESPN's weekly schedule from five games to three, ESPN released numerous commentators from the network, including Jeff Brantley, Tino Martinez, Steve Stone and Eric Karros.

With the new deal coming into play this year, several things changed with the Monday and Wednesday night games in particular. For Monday Night Baseball, the telecast will now co-exist with teams' local carriers up to three times per year, up from two times in previous years. Wednesday Night Baseball also changed slightly. Now, in addition to the featured game that night, they will also have some live cut-ins to other games across the nation and discuss some the hot topics in the major leagues.

ESPN telecasts in 2006, posted an average of 1,115,000 household impressions, up 27% when compared to 2005's 875,000. The corresponding 1.2 rating this year marks a 20% increase over the 1.0 average in 2005. ESPN2's baseball telecasts have averaged 704,000 households, an increase of 34% over 2005's 525,000. Ratings on ESPN2 went up 33% (0.8 vs. 0.6).

During their broadcast of Game 3 of the 2006 American League Championship Series, Lou Piniella, who is of Spanish descent, made an analogy involving the luck of finding a wallet, and then briefly used a couple of Spanish phrases. Fox color commentator Steve Lyons responded by saying that Piniella was "hablaing Español" – Spanglish for "speaking Spanish" – and added, "I still can't find my wallet. I don't understand him, and I don't want to sit close to him now." On October 13, 2006, Fox fired Lyons for making these remarks, which the network determined to be racially insensitive. Lyons was replaced for the last game of the series in Detroit by Los Angeles Angels announcer José Mota. Piniella later stated that he thought that Lyons was just "kidding" and that Lyons was, per Piniella's experience, not bigoted. Lyons had previously maligned Los Angeles Dodgers outfielder Shawn Green, who is Jewish, for sitting out a game on Yom Kippur in 2004, saying "He's not even a practicing Jew. He didn't marry a Jewish girl. And from what I understand, he never had a bar mitzvah, which is unfortunate because he doesn't get the money." Lyons was suspended briefly without pay after his remarks, and Fox apologized for Lyons' comments, though Lyons never made an on-air apology.

=== 2007 ===
In 2007, Fox began airing games every Saturday during the season. A new scheduling format was devised, in which all of the regional games started simultaneously. Fox moved the pregame, which became part of the exclusive game window, to 3:30 p.m. Eastern Time. All of the Fox games would then start at 3:55 p.m. Eastern Time, regardless of region. This format gave more leeway for teams not being shown on Fox to schedule daytime games. Fox's exclusivity began at the start of the pregame at 3:30 and ran until 7:00 p.m. Eastern.

On April 1, for the season-opening game between the New York Mets and the St. Louis Cardinals, ESPN changed its on-screen graphics to the version that debuted with Monday Night Football in 2006 and was later adopted by its NBA coverage at the start of the 2006-07 season. The previous graphics dated back to the advent of ESPN HD in 2004.

In 2007, Joe Buck was only scheduled to call eight regular season MLB games out of a 26-game schedule for Fox (along with a handful of regional St. Louis Cardinals telecasts on FSN Midwest). In an interview with Richard Sandomir of the New York Times, Buck defended his reduced baseball commitment:

If you or the casual fan doesn't want to consider me the No. 1 baseball announcer at Fox, it's not my concern ... I don't know why it would matter. I don't know who had a more tiresome, wall-to-wall schedule than my father, and I know what it's like to be a kid in that situation ... He was gone a lot. He needed to be. I understood it. So did my mom. Because my career has gone the way it's gone, I don't have to go wall to wall. ...While I’m deathly afraid of overexposure, I'm more afraid of underexposure at home with my wife and girls.

In 2008, Buck drew criticism for comments he made during an appearance on ESPN Radio's The Herd with Colin Cowherd, in which he admitted to spending "barely any" time following sporting events he does not broadcast, and facetiously claimed that he preferred watching The Bachelorette instead.

In general, Fox's initial lead broadcast team of Joe Buck and Tim McCarver had been heavily scrutinized, much less criticized over time. During the 2012 National League Championship Series between the San Francisco Giants and St. Louis Cardinals, Buck and McCarver were accused by the San Francisco media in particular, of being too biased towards the Cardinals.

During the week of the All-Star Game, Baseball Tonight and SportsCenter did not travel to the game site as it normally does; the 2007 site was AT&T Park in San Francisco. The reason was that MLB stripped ESPN of its on-site credentials for its studio crew as punishment for leaking the rosters of the All-Star teams before TBS did. TBS' announcement, which was billed as exclusive, was scheduled for 4 p.m. Eastern time but was delayed for nearly two hours, by which point ESPN, in apparent violation of its contract with MLB, went ahead and revealed the rosters anyway. ESPN later agreed to promote playoff coverage on TBS and Fox (alongside its own radio coverage) in return for Baseball Tonight going on the air shortly after each night's games concluded.

ESPN pre-empted part of the Kansas State–Auburn college football game on September 1 to show the end of the no-hitter thrown by Boston Red Sox pitcher Clay Buchholz.

From 2007 to 2010, when TBS aired every Division Series game, start times were staggered throughout the day from early afternoon to late primetime. The first game was usually scheduled to start at 1:07 and the last game was usually scheduled for 9:07. If a game ran long, the start of the next game would be shifted to TNT (the game would move back to TBS during the first commercial break after the end of the earlier game, with an announcement from the in-studio crew to switch to TBS). For the LCS round, TBS would show all of the games at a start time pre-set by MLB. All coverage was followed by Inside MLB. This schedule was brought back for 2013 only, with the exception that MLB Network aired the two games scheduled for the early afternoon slot.

During some broadcasts, Fox has experienced various technical difficulties. During its broadcast of Game 3 of the 2007 World Series between the Colorado Rockies and Boston Red Sox, for instance, a blackout occurred during the top half of the seventh inning, resulting in the disruption of a key moment in the game.

=== 2008 ===
Beginning with the 2006 NFL season, Fox's other properties, the NFL, NASCAR, the Bowl Championship Series, and Formula One, again upgraded their graphics packages (Formula One used a different graphics package than the other three properties), but baseball broadcasts continued to use this on-screen design in 2007. It was also used in the July 12, 2008 game between the Colorado Rockies and the New York Mets until the 9th inning, but with the 2008 graphics package instead of the package that was used with this banner.

ESPN2 showed the season-opening games in Tokyo between the Boston Red Sox and the Oakland Athletics. Unfortunately, due to a transponder failure, viewers on DirecTV reliant on the standard-definition feed missed the first of the two games. (ESPNHD was unaffected.)

On March 30, ESPN showed the first-ever game at Nationals Park in Washington, D.C. The Nationals defeated the Atlanta Braves on a walk-off home run by Ryan Zimmerman.

On May 4, ESPN introduced enhanced updates targeting viewers who play fantasy baseball. It shows season batting statistics for the current batter on each potential count and updates batting average and other selected stats after the at-bat concludes.

Sunday Night Baseball broadcast the Washington Nationals' very first game at Nationals Park on March 30, 2008. The Nationals beat the Atlanta Braves, 3–2, on Ryan Zimmerman's walk-off home run in the bottom of the ninth. President George W. Bush, who threw out the ceremonial first pitch prior to the game, joined Jon Miller and Joe Morgan in the ESPN booth during the telecast.

The final game played at Yankee Stadium on September 21, 2008, pitting the New York Yankees against the Baltimore Orioles, was broadcast on Sunday Night Baseball.

The Mariano Rivera 500th career save (and also his 1st lifetime RBI) was broadcast on Sunday Night Baseball from Citi Field (home of the New York Mets).

TBS began airing the game just prior to the last out in the bottom of the first, with announcer Chip Caray apologizing to viewers for "technical difficulties." TBS acknowledged there was a problem with one of the routers used in the broadcast transmission of the relay of the telecast from Atlanta.

=== 2009 ===
Fox discontinued its pregame show in 2009, with the telecasts now beginning at 4:00 p.m. Eastern and the game time being pushed to 4:10. Fox gave up the first half-hour of its exclusivity, with its window now beginning at 4:00 p.m. Eastern Time.

For the 2009 season, telecasts began using the same graphics package implemented by FSN, with the scoreboard now including a rectangular box in the top-left corner of the 4:3 safe area. Along with FSN in observance of the holiday weekend, the baserunner graphic was changed to a blue pattern with stars during the Fourth of July weekend and All-Star Game in 2010. Also in July 2010, broadcasts began to be produced in full 16:9 widescreen and letterboxed for standard definition viewers through the use of the #10 Active Format Description code (which is primarily used for Fox broadcasts transmitted to pay television providers via its stations). The score box was moved to be in the top-left corner of the widescreen feed.

Some sports media critics were critical of the announcers used in the coverage on TBS as being more skewed towards the National League than the American League, along with the choice of Chip Caray (who along the way, was criticized for making factual mistakes during postseason broadcasts) as the lead voice of the network's coverage, as he had only done Braves baseball telecasts during the 2007 season before TBS assumed rights to playoff coverage. In response to such criticisms, Caray said, "It wasn't the job that I had when I came here in the first place. It would be like being a pinch-hitter or being a relief pitcher that works once every ten days. I'm better when I work more." TBS and Caray parted ways following the 2009 playoffs. Ernie Johnson Jr., Dick Stockton and Brian Anderson began handling play-by-play duties in his place.

Following the Philadelphia Phillies' victory in the 2009 NLCS, TBS studio host Ernie Johnson went to the podium to present the championship trophy.
