= Hollowell (surname) =

Hollowell is a surname. Notable people with the surname include:

- Alicia Hollowell (born 1984), American softball player
- Barry Hollowell (1948–2016), Canadian Anglican bishop
- Bud Hollowell (born 1943), American baseball player and writer
- Donald L. Hollowell (1917–2004), American lawyer
- Fred S. Hollowell (1883–1960), New York politician
- Gavin Hollowell (born 1997), American baseball player
- James Hollowell (1823–1876), English soldier and Victoria Cross recipient
- Matt Hollowell (born 1971), American baseball umpire
- Melvin Hollowell, American lawyer and politician
- Terri Hollowell (born 1956), American singer
- T. J. Hollowell (Thomas Anthony Hollowell, born 1981), American football player
