= 1998 National League Wild Card tie-breaker game =

1998 Major League Baseball tie-breaker game

1998 National League Wild Card tie-breaker
	1	2	3	4	5	6	7	8	9	R	H	E
San Francisco Giants	0	0	0	0	0	0	0	0	3	3	6	0
Chicago Cubs	0	0	0	0	2	2	0	1	x	5	10	0
- Date: September 28, 1998
- Venue: Wrigley Field
- City: Chicago, Illinois
- Umpires: HP: Bruce Froemming; 1B: Steve Rippley; 2B: Gary Darling; 3B: Mike Winters; LF: Larry Poncino; RF: Larry Vanover
- Attendance: 39,556
- Television: ESPN
- TV announcers: Jon Miller and Joe Morgan
- Radio: ESPN; KNBR (SF); WGN (CHC)
- Radio announcers: ESPN: Charley Steiner and Kevin Kennedy; KNBR: Mike Krukow, Duane Kuiper, Lon Simmons and Ted Robinson; WGN: Pat Hughes and Ron Santo

The 1998 National League Wild Card tie-breaker game was a one-game extension to Major League Baseball's (MLB) 1998 regular season, played between the Chicago Cubs and San Francisco Giants, to determine the National League (NL) wild card winner. The game occurred at Wrigley Field in Chicago, on September 28, 1998. The Cubs won the game 5–3, holding the Giants scoreless for most of the game until the Giants threatened heavily in the ninth inning and scored all three runs. As a result of the game, the Cubs qualified for the postseason, and the Giants did not.

The game was necessary after both teams finished the season with identical win-loss records of 89–73. The Cubs won a coin flip late in the season, which, by rule at the time, awarded them home field for the game. This victory advanced the Cubs to the 1998 NL Division Series (NLDS), where they were swept by the Atlanta Braves, ending the Cubs' season. Michael Jordan, a popular Chicago sportsman who had just led the Chicago Bulls to a sixth championship in eight years, threw the game's ceremonial first pitch. In baseball statistics, the tiebreaker counted as the 163rd regular season game for both teams, with all events in the game added to regular season statistics.

== Background ==
The Cubs finished the previous season at the bottom of the NL Central Division with a 68–94 record, while the Giants won the NL West at 90–72; however, they were defeated by the eventual World Series champion Florida Marlins in the NLDS. The Giants' Barry Bonds drew criticism for his postseason performance, which had been a recurring criticism dating back to his time with the Pittsburgh Pirates. The Cubs made several offseason acquisitions following the 1997 season, including trading Doug Glanville for second baseman Mickey Morandini and signing Jeff Blauser and Henry Rodríguez as free agents.

One notable event of the 1998 season was the race for the home run title and Roger Maris' single-season record of 61 home runs between the Cubs' Sammy Sosa and the St. Louis Cardinals' Mark McGwire. McGwire ultimately won, setting a new record of 70, while Sosa closed the season with 66. Additionally, three teams finished the 1998 season within one game of one another in the race for the National League wild card: the Cubs, Giants, and New York Mets. This late-season race included a dramatic Cubs loss to the Brewers on September 23. The Cubs led 7–5 with two outs and the bases loaded for the Brewers at the bottom of the ninth inning when Brant Brown dropped a fly ball, allowing three unearned runs to score on his error and losing the Cubs the game. This loss gained notoriety for the announcer and former-Cub Ron Santo's call of the final play, yelling "Oh, no!" as the final runs scored.

The Mets were tied with the Cubs and Giants in the wild-card race as late as September 25 at 88–72. However, the Mets lost their remaining two games and finished their season one game back of the Cubs and Giants, who ended tied at 89–73. This record was also the best non-division-winning record, so a tiebreaker was necessary to determine the wild-card winner. A coin flip on September 14 gave the Cubs home-field advantage, setting Wrigley Field as the location for the game. In the event of a three-way tie, the Cubs were given the choice to either host two home games or receive a bye and play the winner of a Mets-Giants game on the road because they had the best combined record against the Mets and Giants. Cubs' general manager Ed Lynch decided on the second option, though the choice was moot as the Mets fell out of the race. The Cubs' Steve Trachsel and the Giants' Mark Gardner were slated to start the tie-breaker on September 28.

== Game Summary ==
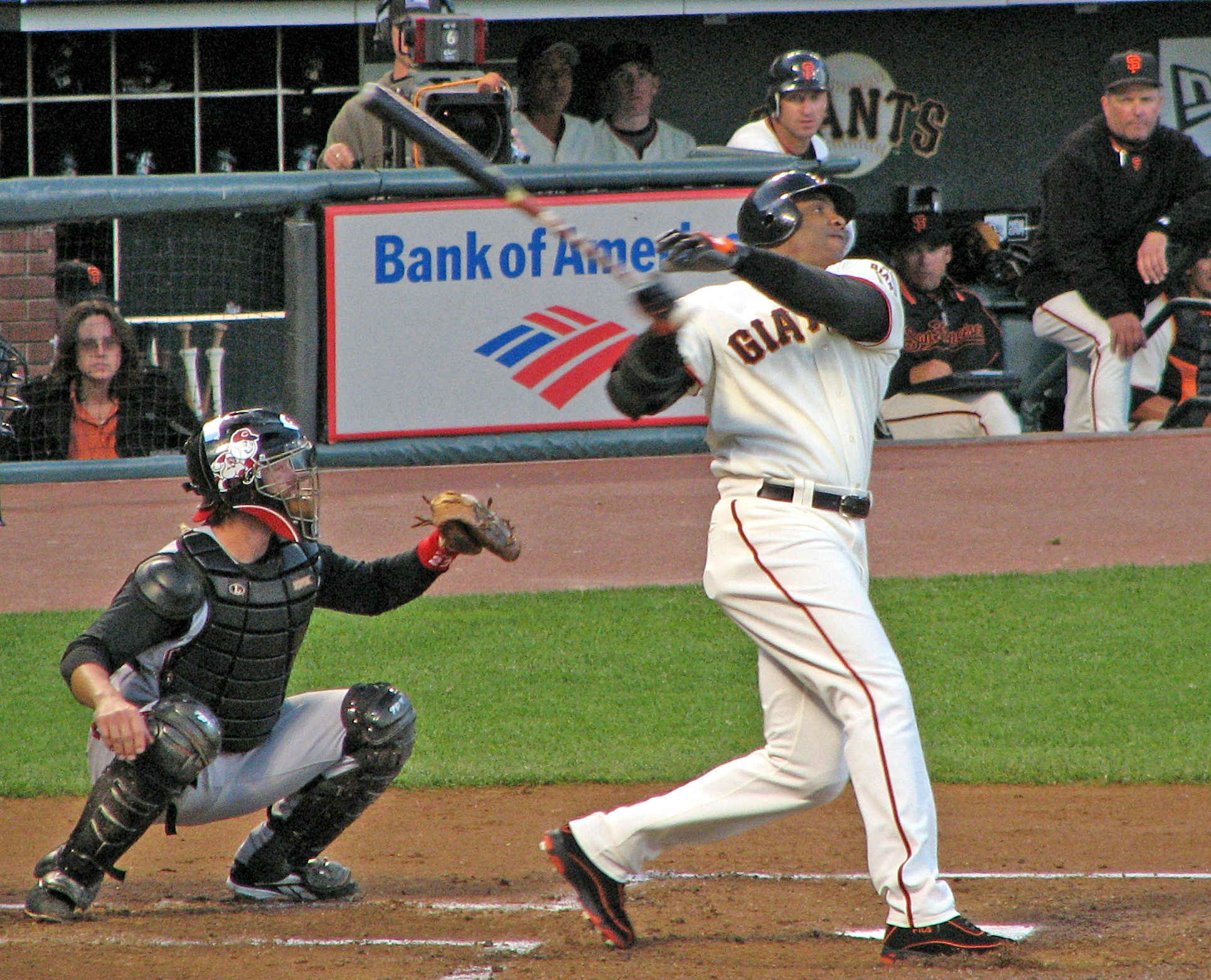
Barry Bonds had a poor offensive performance in the tie-breaker, twice making outs with the bases loaded en route to the worst win probability added for any player in the game. The authors of Game of Shadows allege that Bonds turned to performance-enhancing drugs after the 1998 season.

Monday, September 28, 1998 7:10 pm (CDT) at Wrigley Field in Chicago, Illinois 66 °F (19 °C), Clear
Team	1	2	3	4	5	6	7	8	9	R	H	E
San Francisco	0	0	0	0	0	0	0	0	3	3	6	0
Chicago	0	0	0	0	2	2	0	1	X	5	10	0
WP: Steve Trachsel (15–8) LP: Mark Gardner (13–6) Sv: Rod Beck (51); Home runs: SFG: None; CHC: Gary Gaetti (19); Attendance: 39,556

The game remained scoreless in the early innings, with only two baserunners apiece for each team through the first three. The Giants loaded the bases with two outs in the top of the fourth inning, but Brian Johnson struck out to end the inning. The game's first run came in the bottom of the fifth as Henry Rodriguez singled to lead off the inning and scored on a home run by Gary Gaetti to give the Cubs a 2–0 lead. The Cubs threatened again in the next inning with Lance Johnson and Sammy Sosa singles. Rich Rodriguez relieved Gardner but loaded the bases with a walk to Mark Grace and allowed a single to Matt Mieske scoring two more runs and extending the Cubs' lead to 4–0. John Johnstone relieved Rodriguez and closed the inning without further scoring.

After getting one out in the top of the seventh, Steve Trachsel allowed a single and a walk to pinch hitters Brent Mayne and Armando Ríos, respectively. The Cubs double-switched, bringing Matt Karchner to relieve Trachsel and Orlando Merced to play left field. Karchner induced another out before loading the bases on a single by Shawon Dunston. Félix Heredia relieved Karchner and got Barry Bonds to ground out to first base to end the inning. The Cubs further extended their lead in the bottom of the eighth inning. After Alvin Morman got Morandini to strike out to open the inning the Giants double-switched to bring José Mesa to pitch and Bill Mueller at third base. Mesa allowed a single to Sammy Sosa and a double to Mark Grace, which advanced Sosa to third. Following a ground out, Mesa threw a wild pitch while facing Gaetti, and Sosa scored to make the game 5–0.

The Giants responded at the top of the ninth, scoring their only runs in the game. Kevin Tapani allowed successive singles to Brent Mayne and Mueller to open the inning before Terry Mulholland relieved him. Stan Javier singled to score Mayne, and Ellis Burks, then walked to load the bases. Bonds came to bat with the bases loaded for the second time in the game and lined out to deep right field, scoring Mueller on a sacrifice fly, and Javier advanced to third base. Rod Beck entered and got successive outs by Jeff Kent, which scored Javier and Joe Carter to end the game 5–3 for the Cubs.

== Aftermath ==
Chicago's win clinched the team's 15th postseason berth in franchise history and their first since 1989. The Cubs' presence in the postseason led several sportswriters to reference the Curse of the Billy Goat and the difficulties the Cubs' had faced since 1945. The Billy Goat story suggests that Billy Sianis cursed the Cubs after he and his goat were asked to leave Game Four of the 1945 World Series. The playoff berth matched the Cubs with the Atlanta Braves in the NLDS, where the Cubs were swept 3 games to 0. The Cubs would have to wait another 18 years to win the National League pennant and World Series in 2016, their first NL pennant since 1945 and their first title since 1908.

In baseball statistics tiebreakers count as regular season games, with all events added to regular season statistics. For example, the Chicago Sun-Times noted that Sammy Sosa could have added to his notable home run total in the game. Sosa did add to his league-leading strikeout total with one in the fourth inning. Beck also added to his league-leading total in games played and earned his 51st save of the season which finished second to Trevor Hoffman's 53 but is tied for the ninth-highest single-season save total in MLB history. Several Cubs and Giants won awards for their regular season performances, including Rookie of the Year honors for Kerry Wood, a Silver Slugger Award for Sosa, and a Rawlings Gold Glove Award for J. T. Snow. Sosa also won the National League's Most Valuable Player award, earning 30 out of 32 first-place votes (with McGwire taking the remaining 2).

Barry Bonds drew criticism after the game for his poor performance, including twice making an out with the bases loaded, with some suggesting that Bonds often played poorly in "big games". Bonds' 0–4 performance with an RBI and a strikeout earned him a −.186 win probability added (WPA), the lowest figure for any player in the game. WPA is a statistic which considers the game situation to quantify how a player altered his team's chances of winning. Bonds' figure translates into decreasing the Giants' chances of success by 18.6%. The book Game of Shadows, which details Bonds' suggested use of performance-enhancing drugs (PED), argues that Bonds grew jealous and resentful of the attention Mark McGwire and Sammy Sosa were given during their record chase. As a result, according to Game of Shadows, Bonds turned to weight training under Greg Anderson, who began providing him with steroids and other PEDs following the 1998 season.
