= Scooter (talking baseball) =

Animated character

Scooter was an anthropomorphic animated baseball character used by Fox Sports during Major League Baseball games to explain different types of pitches in a way that was engaging to kids. The character appeared from 2004 until at least 2006 and was voiced by Tom Kenny (best known for his work as the voice of SpongeBob SquarePants).

== Critical reaction ==
Scooter debuted in the 2004 baseball season on April 16, during a game between the New York Yankees and Boston Red Sox. While Fox Sports television chairman David Hill called Scooter "really cute and really terrific," the character garnered few positive reactions otherwise, with Sports Illustrated writer John Donovan warning: "purists everywhere, grab the barf bag," and Sports Illustrated media writer Richard Deitsch using Scooter as an example of "how technology does not always help society." The Sporting News reported polling their staff with the question "What best summarizes your feelings for Scooter, FOX's talking baseball?", and 45% of respondents chose the answer "Send him to a slow, painful death." Despite the negative reactions, Scooter would still be used in televised baseball games until after the 2006 World Series.

== Peter Puck comparisons ==
Some television historians have noticed the similarities between Scooter and Peter Puck, an animated hockey puck that was used by Hockey Night in Canada and NHL on NBC in the 1970s to explain the rules of hockey to viewers. However, Peter Puck was well loved by viewers and is often looked at with nostalgia, whereas Scooter has been met with little but derision.
