= Wednesday Night Baseball =

- Genre: American baseball game telecasts
- Presented by: Various commentators
- Country of origin: United States
- Original language: English
- No. of seasons: 37 (through 2026 season)

Production
- Production locations: Various MLB stadiums (game telecasts)
- Camera setup: Multi-camera
- Running time: 210 minutes or until game ends (inc. adverts)
- Production companies: Major League Baseball; ESPN (1990–present)

Original release
- Network: ESPN
- Release: April 11, 1990 – present

Related
- Baseball Tonight; ESPN Major League Baseball; Monday Night Baseball; Sunday Night Baseball; Major League Baseball on ESPN Radio

Wednesday Night Baseball is a live game telecast of Major League Baseball during Wednesday nights in the regular season on ESPN or ESPN2. From 1990 to 2021, ESPN generally aired weekly games on Wednesday nights. Beginning with the 2022 Major League Baseball season, ESPN significantly reduced their MLB schedule, which included cutting most of their Wednesday Night Baseball games.

On ESPN, the game generally starts at 7:00 pm ET, following SportsCenter, and usually lasted around three hours with an hour-long Baseball Tonight following the game leading up to the 11:00 pm ET SportsCenter (1:00 am ET for September games with Baseball Tonight moving to ESPN2 at 12:00 am ET). Every April some broadcasts aired on ESPN2 due to ESPN's priority with Wednesday NBA coverage.

Until 2022, Wednesday Night Baseball was not exclusive and was usually blacked out in the teams' local markets, where the respective local broadcasters could still air the game, unless local broadcasters chose not to televise the game. Since 2022, ESPN's limited Wednesday Night Baseball is now exclusive to the network.

== History ==
=== 1990–2021 ===
The program debuted in 1990, when ESPN first acquired MLB rights. This gave ESPN to have Sunday Night Baseball and Wednesday Night Baseball. From 2000 to 2005, broadcasts consisted of a doubleheader, usually airing the first game at 7:00 pm ET on ESPN and the second at 10:00 pm ET on ESPN2. The second part of the doubleheader was discontinued after the 2005 season in favor of regular broadcasts of Monday Night Baseball.

ESPN planned to show Blue Jays-Rangers on May 1, 1991. The ESPN president, at the time, Steve Bornstein was friends with the Texas Rangers manager Bobby Valentine. If Valentine told Bornstein that Nolan Ryan was pitching (or if he had left a voice mail), the network would have aired the game. Valentine called Bornstein and claimed that he's expecting Nolan Ryan to pitch on Friday, instead of Wednesday. However, to no one's surprise, Nolan Ryan ended up pitching, on Wednesday and not on Friday, and broke the MLB record of career no-hitters with seven, which hasn't been beaten or tied ever since. The network was forced to simulcast the Rangers local feed, for the bottom of the 8th and the top of the 9th, interrupting their own coverage of Tigers-Royals, except in Texas, and pre-empting the conclusion of Red Sox-Twins.

The issues with the program were forecasted almost immediately: a reviewer in 1990 stated that in order to survive Wednesday Night Baseball has to become a staple like Major League Baseball Game of the Week which will "strain the cable marketers to their limits", as there is only so much sports programming viewers can watch and pay for.

Wednesdays also formerly included an afternoon game, called ESPN DayGame which aired typically at 12:30 pm or 1:00 pm ET on ESPN, making Wednesdays ESPN's primary day of baseball, as games aired both in the afternoon and in primetime. However, ESPN DayGame was also discontinued following the 2006 season.

=== 2022–2025 ===
In 2021, ESPN agreed to a new contract with MLB through the 2028 season. However, the deal included only around 30 exclusive broadcasts, 25 of which took place on Sunday Night Baseball, ending the regular broadcast of Wednesday Night Baseball, however most of the remaining games under that deal aired on Wednesday.

=== 2026–present ===
On February 20, 2025, ESPN informed MLB that it had agreed to mutually opt out of its current contract after the conclusion of the 2025 season.

On November 19, 2025, ESPN announced a restructured three-year deal with MLB. Under this new deal, ESPN would televise a 30-game schedule primarily on summer weeknights, ending Sunday Night Baseball. For the 2026 season, ESPN announced that 10 games would air on Wednesday nights.
