= ESPN Major League Baseball =

MLB baseball cable telecasts (1990–present)

- Also known as: Baseball Tonight; Major League Baseball on ABC; Monday Night Baseball; Sunday Night Baseball; Wednesday Night Baseball
- Genre: American baseball game telecasts
- Presented by: Various commentators
- Country of origin: United States
- Original language: English
- No. of seasons: 37 (through 2026 season)

Production
- Production locations: Various MLB stadiums (game telecasts); ESPN Headquarters; Bristol, Connecticut (2020)
- Camera setup: Multi-camera
- Running time: 210 minutes or until game ends (inc. adverts)
- Production companies: Major League Baseball; ESPN

Original release
- Network: ESPN
- Release: April 9, 1990 – present
- Network: ABC
- Release: September 29, 2020 – present
- Network: ESPN2
- Release: May 29, 2022 – August 17, 2025

Related
- Major League Baseball on ESPN Radio

ESPN Major League Baseball (also referred to as MLB on ESPN) is an American presentation of live Major League Baseball (MLB) games produced by ESPN. ESPN's MLB broadcasts have also aired on sister networks ABC and ESPN2.

ESPN's MLB coverage debuted on April 9, 1990 with three Opening Day telecasts. ESPN has held the exclusive national broadcast rights to Sunday Night Baseball from 1990 to 2025. The network also airs the defending world champions game on Opening Day. In addition to regular-season games, ESPN also airs several spring training games per year, the All-Star Legends and Celebrity Softball Game (until 2021) and Home Run Derby played the week of the All-Star Game. In 2014, ESPN returned to broadcasting the Major League Baseball postseason, and has held the exclusive rights to the entire Wild Card Series since 2022.

ESPN also airs a weekly highlight and commentary show called Baseball Tonight prior to the game as a lead-in to Sunday Night Baseball; previously it was a daily program until 2017, when layoffs cut back the show's airing to Sundays.

ESPN Radio has also been airing Major League Baseball since 1998 (succeeding CBS Radio), broadcasting Sunday Night Baseball as well as select other regular-season games, the All-Star Game and Home Run Derby, and the entire postseason including the Wild Card Game, Division Series, League Championship Series and World Series.

In a contract extension signed in 2021, ESPN Major League Baseball was originally to remain on the air through the 2028 season, but both ESPN and MLB exercised a mutual opt-out to terminate the agreement following the 2025 season. The two companies then signed a new agreement for those seasons.

== History ==
Since ESPN first received MLB telecast rights, it has become traditional for ESPN to make an effort to cover live historic moments in the sport. For example, in 2007, ESPN and ESPN2 added several telecasts when Barry Bonds chased Hank Aaron's record for most home runs in an MLB career. ESPN had the national telecasts on August 4 when Bonds tied Aaron with number 755 and on August 7, 2007 when he hit number 756. ESPN was also the broadcaster of the final game at the original Yankee Stadium as a part of Sunday Night Baseball with Jon Miller and Hall of Famer Joe Morgan. It also showed Chris Burke's 18th-inning walk-off homer to end the 2005 NLDS series in favor of the Houston Astros against the Atlanta Braves. The St. Louis Cardinals swept the San Diego Padres in the other NLDS Series.

Also, ESPN has been given permission to interrupt regular programming, when allowed, to show attempts at new records or significant milestones live. Examples include three cut-ins from its coverage of the first X Games in 1995 until Eddie Murray recorded his 3000th hit, live coverage of Sammy Sosa's 600th home run in 2007, and a number of no-hitters, including the Buchholz feat mentioned earlier. Although it cannot show any historic attempts live during the Fox or TBS exclusive windows, it was allowed to show an in-progress highlight of Alex Rodriguez's 500th career home run in August 2007, as this was on a Saturday afternoon before Fox went on the air with its game coverage.

=== 1990s ===
On January 5, 1989, Major League Baseball signed a $400 million deal with ESPN, who would show over 175 games beginning in 1990. For the next four years, ESPN would televise six games a week (Sunday Night Baseball, Wednesday Night Baseball and doubleheaders on Tuesdays and Fridays), as well as multiple games on Opening Day, Memorial Day, Independence Day, and Labor Day.

On April 15, 1990, ESPN's Sunday Night Baseball debuted with the experienced play-by-play announcer Jon Miller joining retired Hall of Fame player Joe Morgan in the broadcast booth. In its first year, Sunday Night Baseball averaged a 3.0 rating. That was double the number that ESPN as a whole was averaging at the time (1.5). By 1998, ESPN enjoyed its largest baseball audience ever (a 9.5 Nielsen rating) as Mark McGwire hit his 61st home run of the season. When ESPN first broadcast Sunday Night Baseball, they would show at least one game from every ballpark. Also, every team was guaranteed an appearance. It was essentially, the television equivalent to a cross country stadium tour.

In 1994, ESPN renewed its baseball contract for six years (through the 1999 season). The new deal was worth $42.5 million per year and $255 million overall. The deal was ultimately voided after the 1995 season and ESPN was pretty much forced to restructure their contract. In 1995, ESPN broadcast the American League West tie-breaker game between the Seattle Mariners and California Angels with Jon Miller and Joe Morgan making the call.

In 1996, ESPN began a five-year contract with Major League Baseball worth $440 million and about $80 million per year. ESPN paid for the rights to a Wednesday night doubleheader and Sunday Night Baseball, as well as Opening Day and holiday telecasts and all postseason games not aired on Fox or NBC. Major League Baseball staggered the times of first-round games to provide a full-day feast for viewers: ESPN could air games at 1 p.m., 4 p.m., and 11 p.m. EDT, with the broadcast networks telecasting the prime time game.

In 1998, ESPN broadcast the National League Wild Card tie-breaker game between the Chicago Cubs and San Francisco Giants. Like the American League West tie-breaker game in 1995, Jon Miller and Joe Morgan were on the call for ESPN.

In 1999, NBC's Bob Costas teamed with Joe Morgan to call two weekday night telecasts for ESPN. The first was on Wednesday, August 25 with Detroit Tigers playing against the Seattle Mariners. The second was on Tuesday, September 21 with the Atlanta Braves playing against the New York Mets. Later that year, ESPN broadcast the National League Wild Card tie-breaker game (this time between the New York Mets and Cincinnati Reds) with Miller and Morgan once again on the call.

=== 2000s ===
ESPN and ESPN2 had contracts (which were signed in 2000 and ran through 2005) to show selected weeknight and Sunday Night Baseball games, along with Opening Day and holiday games and selected Division Series playoff games. The contracts with ESPN were worth $141.8 million per year and $851 million overall.

In 2002, Disney bought Fox Family, which had aired Thursday night games and some Division Series games in 2000 and 2001 as part of the Fox Sports television contract. ESPN added those games to its package, shifting the Thursday night games to weekday afternoon DayGame broadcasts. The play-by-play commentators for ESPN DayGame were Gary Thorne or Jon Sciambi along with Steve Phillips, and Steve Stone as color analysts. However, because of existing contractual obligations, the 2002 Division Series games were required to be broadcast on the renamed ABC Family. Those broadcasts used ESPN announcers, graphics, and music. The following season they aired on ESPN.

==== 2006 ====
ESPN Major League Baseball logo (2006–2011)

On September 14, 2005, ESPN signed an eight-year contract with Major League Baseball that began with the 2006 season, renewing their rights to Sunday Night Baseball and Wednesday Night Baseball, with the late (10 p.m. ET) Wednesday night game replaced by a regular weekly Monday Night Baseball telecast instead. The network also dropped special coverage of Memorial Day, Independence Day, and Labor Day games, though Memorial Day and Labor Day were still included in the Monday night coverage.

While Sunday Night Baseball remained exclusive, ESPN's Monday and Wednesday telecasts were mostly nonexclusive, meaning the games were also televised by each club's local broadcasters, while ESPN's broadcasts were blacked out in the participating teams' local markets. Previously, ESPN would carry an alternate telecast (usually a simulcast of another game's local broadcast) for home-team markets which were blacked out, but those were phased out, with ESPNEWS replacing the feed.

On July 25, 2006, Harold Reynolds was fired from ESPN. The ESPN spokeswoman confirmed that Reynolds "is no longer with the network" but did not give a reason for the departure. Reynolds confirmed that an accusation of sexual harassment was the reason for his departure but called it "a total misunderstanding" and that "I gave a woman a hug and I felt like it was misinterpreted." In February 2008, ESPN and Reynolds reached an out-of-court settlement.

Weeks later, Peter Gammons was sidelined with a brain aneurysm. Gammons returned to ESPN in early September.

The weekday afternoon DayGame telecasts continued through the 2006 season as they were still covered under the separate contract inherited from Fox Family. With that contract expiring at the end of the season, the last DayGame broadcast was on September 30, 2006. The expiration of that contract also ended ESPN's involvement in broadcasting the postseason for the time being, as Fox had actually retained right-of-first-refusal of the postseason part of the contract in the sale, and chose to exercise that right to add more Division Series games. ESPN's last postseason broadcast under the contract was one of the 2006 American League Division Series.

ESPN telecasts in 2006, posted an average of 1,115,000 household impressions, up 27% when compared to 2005's 875,000. The corresponding 1.2 rating this year marks a 20% increase over the 1.0 average in 2005. ESPN2's baseball telecasts have averaged 704,000 households, an increase of 34% over 2005's 525,000. Ratings on ESPN2 went up 33% (0.8 vs. 0.6).

==== 2007 ====
Because of the reduction of ESPN's weekly schedule to three games, ESPN released numerous commentators from the network, including Jeff Brantley, Tino Martinez, Steve Stone and Eric Karros.

On April 1, for the season-opening game between the New York Mets and the St. Louis Cardinals, ESPN changed its on-screen graphics to the version that debuted with Monday Night Football in 2006 and was later adopted by its NBA coverage at the start of the 2006-07 season. The previous graphics dated back to the advent of ESPN HD in 2004.

During the week of the All-Star Game, Baseball Tonight and SportsCenter did not travel to the game site as it previously had; the 2007 site was AT&T Park in San Francisco. The reason was that MLB stripped ESPN of its on-site credentials for its studio crew as punishment for leaking the rosters of the All-Star teams before TBS did. TBS' announcement, which was billed as exclusive, was scheduled for 4 p.m. Eastern time but was delayed for nearly two hours, by which point ESPN, in apparent violation of its contract with MLB, went ahead and revealed the rosters anyway. ESPN later agreed to promote playoff coverage on TBS and Fox (alongside its own radio coverage) in return for Baseball Tonight going on the air shortly after each night's games concluded.

ESPN pre-empted part of the Kansas State–Auburn college football game on September 1 to show the end of the no-hitter thrown by Boston Red Sox pitcher Clay Buchholz.

==== 2008 ====
ESPN2 showed the season-opening games in Tokyo between the Boston Red Sox and the Oakland Athletics. Unfortunately, due to a transponder failure, viewers on DirecTV reliant on the standard-definition feed missed the first of the two games. (ESPNHD was unaffected.)

On March 30, ESPN showed the first-ever game at Nationals Park in Washington, D.C. The Washington Nationals defeated the Atlanta Braves on a walk-off home run by Ryan Zimmerman.

On May 4, ESPN introduced enhanced updates targeting viewers who play fantasy baseball. It shows season batting statistics for the current batter on each potential count and updates batting average and other selected stats after the at-bat concludes.

=== 2010s ===
==== 2010 ====
Starting with the April 3 season opener between the New York Yankees and Boston Red Sox, ESPN began using the same graphics package which debuted with Monday Night Football in 2009. The score banner was converted to a score box in the bottom right hand corner of the screen. And instead of numbers to represent the balls, strikes and outs, dots were represented for each: three green dots for balls, two yellow dots for strikes, and two red dots for outs. The pitch count was also introduced, adopted from the New York Yankees' broadcasts on the YES Network, as well as NESN for the Boston Red Sox. College baseball and softball broadcasts, however, continued to use the previous (2007) graphics for the 2010 College World Series telecasts. ESPN's coverage of the Little League World Series also retained the 2007 graphics until midway through, and then adopted the current (2010) graphics package.

Baseball Tonight, a daily highlight show aired on ESPN during the baseball season, likewise introduced new graphics adopted from SportsCenter in June 2010.

==== 2011 ====
The ESPN Major League Baseball score box was slightly modified beginning with the opening day game between the Detroit Tigers and the New York Yankees. Numbers indicating the ball, strike and out counts replace the dots used last year; the out dots were adopted by Fox Sports Net on their local broadcasts as well as Major League Baseball on Fox. The pitch speed and count are now fixed below the bases graphic. Also, the area around the bases graphic and ball, strike, and out counter is slightly translucent.

Beginning with the Sunday Night Baseball interleague game between the New York Yankees and the Chicago Cubs on June 19, the graphics were slightly adjusted to fit in with the 16:9 aspect ratio for HD broadcasts, similar to what Fox Saturday Baseball, Root Sports and Fox Sports Net have done for their baseball coverage. TBS would follow suit in adjusting their graphics to the 16:9 aspect ratio.

==== 2012 ====
ESPN Major League Baseball logo (2012–2017)

The score box and other graphics were carried over from 2011, but a new logo for all ESPN MLB presentations was unveiled at the start of the season. The ESPN logo was fixed on a CGI baseball, with the words 'Major League Baseball' (or Baseball Tonight and Sunday, Monday or Wednesday Night Baseball) in a stylized neon light surrounding it. A 2-D version is also used on print ads or on secondary program IDs. The graphics would stay virtually the same for the next three seasons.

On August 28, Major League Baseball and ESPN agreed to an eight-year, $5.6 billion contract extension, the largest broadcasting deal in Major League Baseball history. It gave ESPN up to 90 regular-season games, one of the two Wild Card games that will rotate between American League and National League teams each year, and the rights to all regular-season tiebreaker games.

==== 2015 ====
For the 2015 season, ESPN introduced a new on-air appearance for baseball. Among its changes were a new, persistent K-Zone Live graphic, consisting of a faded white rectangle that is overlaid live atop the strike zone on the home plate camera angle at all times. A new K-Zone 3D graphic, with ball trails and a three-dimensional box representing the strike zone, can also be used during replays. The new live K-Zone graphic was criticized by viewers and the media for being potentially distracting, drawing comparisons to baseball video games and Fox's "glowing puck" from its NHL coverage.

==== 2017 ====
In the 2017 season, ESPN introduced a new camera angle known as "Front Row Cam"; it is designed to provide a "low-home" camera angle, and utilizes a cylindrical camera pointed vertically at a mirror inside an enclosure positioned along the wall behind home plate. During the American League Wild Card Game, ESPN also introduced a new "immersive" K-Zone 3D component, which allows the data to be rendered into a virtual stadium environment to be viewed at different perspectives.

==== 2018 ====
The 2018 season saw a revamp of ESPN's lead commentary team, with Matt Vasgersian succeeding Dan Shulman, and Alex Rodriguez joining as analyst. ESPN also anticipated increased use of the Front Row Cam on Sunday Night Baseball, and the immersive K-Zone 3D feature being employed on all games (a move enabled by ESPN's full adoption of on-site graphics and replay systems operated remotely from its main studios in Bristol). ESPN also unveiled a major on-air rebranding for its MLB coverage.

=== 2020s ===
The 2020 regular season was delayed by four months due to the COVID-19 pandemic. Matt Vasgersian and Alex Rodriguez would broadcast all of ESPN's Sunday night games from a studio at their Bristol, Connecticut headquarters. Also in July 2020, Major League Baseball announced that they would be expanding the playoffs,

The 2020 postseason introduced an additional "Wild Card Series" round, featuring eight best-of-three series preceding the Division Series. ESPN acquired the rights to seven of the series, with one replacing the Wild Card Game it already carried (the last series was allocated to TBS to replace the Wild Card Game it held the rights to). On September 28, 2020, it was announced that ABC would carry at least four Wild Card Series games, marking ABC's first national MLB broadcast since 1995. During the round, ESPN+ streamed MLB Squeeze Play, a whiparound show that carried in-game highlights and look-ins hosted by Jason Benetti, Kyle Peterson, and Mike Petriello.

In 2021, ESPN renewed its rights through the 2028 season, with the ability for either the network or MLB to opt-out of its contract after the 2025 season. ESPN dropped most of its non-exclusive weeknight broadcasts, focusing primarily on Sunday Night Baseball instead. The network continues to hold rights to at least 30 exclusive regular season games per season, including Sunday Night Baseball and Opening Day games, along with some weeknight games in the second half of the season. ESPN also received the rights to produce alternate telecasts on its sister networks, as well as simulcasts and expanded content on ESPN+, and the ability to air selected games on ABC. The contract also gives ESPN full rights to all postseason Wild Card Series, which were made a permanent part of the postseason that year. In 2022, ESPN aired exclusive Thursday games on Opening Day and the Thursday following the all-star break, as well as two exclusive Wednesday games and one exclusive Monday game during the summer.

For the 2024 season, ESPN acquired the rights to air two MLB World Tour games in Seoul and one game of the MLB Mexico Series, in addition to their 30 exclusive games. New features for the season included "volumetric" replays on its alternate Statcast broadcasts (which would generate replays of plays from the perspective of players), and a persistent "win probability" meter on the scorebug (based on input from ESPN statisticians). To end the regular season, ESPN2 aired a doubleheader featuring the Braves and the Mets. The games were originally scheduled to air on September 25 and 26 but were moved due to Hurricane Helene. The broadcast was blacked out in New York. During the final three weeks of the season, ESPN or ESPN2 aired Baseball Tonight Special: MLB Squeeze Play on Wednesday nights. The studio show featured whip-around coverage focused on the pennant chase.

On February 20, 2025, ESPN informed MLB that it had agreed to mutually opt out of its current contract after the conclusion of the 2025 season. In a memo to teams, commissioner Rob Manfred described ESPN as a "shrinking platform" and expressed disappointment towards ESPN's decreasing commitment to MLB coverage, and stated that the league had "at least two potential options" for ESPN's package that would be presented to teams within the next few weeks.

On November 19, 2025, ESPN announced a restructured three-year deal with MLB. Under this new deal, ESPN would televise a 30-game schedule primarily on summer weeknights, including the MLB Little League Classic, Memorial Day games, and the second-half opener game. ESPN would also assume the rights to sell and distribute the league's streaming service MLB.tv, including out-of-market games and the in-market streaming rights to teams under the MLB Local Media umbrella. However, its flagship broadcast Sunday Night Baseball and the Wild Card Series were moved to NBC, while Netflix took over the rights to the Home Run Derby. The Athletic later reported in January 2026 that the ESPN app may not actually carry the MLB Local Media feeds until 2027, and users would still need to use MLB.tv's platforms directly to watch them.

ESPN announced its full 30 day schedule for 2026 on March 19, 2026. 25 of the 30 games would take place in June, July and August. Games would primarily air on weeknights, with 10 games on Monday, 10 games on Wednesday and 6 games on Thursday. Of the four weekend games, three would air on ABC, with the final game being the MLB Little League Classic on ESPN.

== Technology ==
Through the years, ESPN has enhanced its Major League Baseball coverage with the introduction and implementation of innovative technology. Which include:

- April 1995 – ESPN debuted in-game box scores during Major League Baseball telecasts. Hitting, pitching and fielding stats from the game are shown along the bottom of the screen three times per game.
- May/June 1997 – ESPN debuted MaskCam on an umpire at the College World Series, adding it to major league coverage the following year.
- April 1998 – ESPN debuts BatTrack, which measures the bat speed of hitters.
- April 15, 2001 – ESPN Dead Center debuted on Sunday Night Baseball with Texas vs. Oakland. This new camera angle, directly behind the pitcher, is used to provide true depiction of inside/outside pitch location and is used in certain parks in conjunction with K Zone.
- July 1, 2001 – K Zone officially debuted on Sunday Night Baseball.
- April 7, 2002 – ESPN became the first network to place a microphone on a player during a regular-season baseball game. "Player Mic" was worn by Oakland catcher Ramón Hernández (who also wore "MaskCam") and taped segments were heard.
- May 26, 2002 – "UmpireCam" debuted, worn by Matt Hollowell behind the plate in the New York Yankees at Boston Red Sox telecast.
- March 30, 2003 – ESPNHD, a high-definition simulcast service of ESPN, debuted with the first regular-season MLB game of the season — Texas at Anaheim.
- April 2004 – ESPN's Sunday Night Baseball telecasts added a fantasy baseball bottom line, updating viewers on the stats for their rotisserie league players at 15 and 45 minutes after the hour.
- April 10, 2005 – "SkyCam" premiered during Sunday Night Baseball. "SkyCam" is mounted more than 20 feet above the stands in foul territory and travels down a designated base path (first or third base line, from behind home plate to the foul pole), capturing overhead views of the action. The remote-controlled camera can zoom, pan and tilt.
- April 2, 2006 – A handheld camera brings viewers closer to the action for in-game live shots of home run celebrations, managers approaching the mound and more.
- May 1, 2006 – 'K Zone 2.0' debuted on Monday Night Baseball.

== Ratings ==
=== Sunday Night Baseball ===
Season	Average	% change from previous season	Source
2025	1.78M	↑ 16%	
2024	1.51M	↑ 6%	
2023	1.45M	↓ 3%	
2022	1.49M	↑ 1%	
2021	1.47M	↑ 19%	
2020	1.24M	↓ 23%	
2019	1.60M	↑ 2%	
2018	1.57M	↓ 11%	
2017	1.76M	↑ 8%	
2016	1.63M	↓ 8%	
2015	1.78M	↓ 2%	
2014	1.81M	↓ 2%	
2013	1.85M	↑ 4%	
2012	1.78M	↓ 22%	
2011	2.29M	↑ 5%	
2010	2.18M	↓ 11%	
2009	2.46M	↓ 6%	
2008	2.61M	↓ 5%	
2007	2.75M	–	

=== Playoffs ===
Division Series (2003-2006)

- 2003 National League Division Series
  - Cubs vs Braves (game 2): 5.1 (7.4 million viewers)
  - Cubs vs Braves (game 3): 5.4 (8.1 million viewers)
- 2004 American League Division Series
  - Twins vs Yankees (game 2): 4.7 (6.8 million viewers)
- 2005 American League Division Series
  - Red Sox vs White Sox (game 2): 4.4 (6.4 million viewers)
  - Angels vs Yankees (game 3): 4.9 (7.2 million viewers)
- 2006 American League Division Series
  - Yankees vs Tigers (game 3): 4.4 (6.6 million viewers)

Wild Card Game/Series (2014–present)

- 2014 National League Wild Card Game: 3.6 (5.6 million viewers)
- 2015 American League Wild Card Game: 4.9 (7.6 million viewers)
- 2016 National League Wild Card Game: 4.5 (7.4 million viewers)
- 2017 American League Wild Card Game: 4.2 (6.7 million viewers)
- 2018 National League Wild Card Game: 4.2 (7.0 million viewers)
- 2019 American League Wild Card Game: 2.8 (4.5 million viewers)
- 2020 Wild Card Series:
  - Game 3 Cardinals/Padres: 1.5 (2.6 million viewers)
  - Game 1 Yankees/Indians: 1.5 (2.6 million viewers)
  - Game 2 Yankees/Indians: 1.5 (2.5 million viewers)
  - Game 2 Cardinals/Padres: 1.4 (2.3 million viewers)
  - Game 1 Astros/Twins (ABC): 1.4 (2.2 million viewers)
  - Game 2 Marlins/Cubs (ABC): 1.4 (2.2 million viewers)
  - Game 3 White Sox/A's: 1.2 (1.9 million viewers)
  - Game 3 Brewers/Dodgers: 1.1 (1.8 million viewers)
  - Game 1 Marlins/Cubs (ABC): 1.1 (1.5 million viewers)
  - Game 1 Reds/Braves: 0.9 (1.5 million viewers)
  - Game 2 Reds/Braves: 0.9 (1.4 million viewers)
  - Game 1 Cardinals/Padres: 0.8 (1.3 million viewers)
  - Game 2 White Sox/A's: 0.8 (1.2 million viewers)
  - Game 1 Brewers/Dodgers (ESPN2): 0.6 (1.1 million viewers)
  - Game 2 Brewers/Dodgers (ESPN2): 0.5 (1.0 million viewers)
  - Game 1 White Sox/A's: 0.6 (953 thousand viewers)
  - Game 2 Astros/Twins (ESPN2): 0.4 (731 thousand viewers)
- 2021 American League Wild Card Game: 4.5 (7.7 million viewers)
- 2022 Wild Card Series
  - Game 3 Padres/Mets: 2.0 (3.9 million viewers)
  - Game 1 Padres/Mets: 2.0 (3.6 million viewers)
  - Game 2 Padres/Mets: 1.8 (3.5 million viewers)
  - Game 1 Phillies/Cardinals (ABC): 1.8 (3.1 million viewers)
  - Game 2 Mariners/Blue Jays: 1.4 (2.6 million viewers)
  - Game 2 Phillies/Cardinals (ESPN2): 1.3 (2.5 million viewers)
  - Game 2 Rays/Guardians (ESPN2): 1.3 (2.3 million viewers
  - Game 1 Mariners/Blue Jays: 1.0 (1.8 million viewers)
  - Game 1 Rays/Guardians: 0.8 (1.4 million viewers)
- 2023 Wild Card Series
  - Game 2 Marlins/Phillies: 1.8 (3.2 million viewers)
  - Game 1 Marlins/Phillies: 1.7 (3.0 million viewers)
  - Game 2 Rangers/Rays (ABC): 1.3 (2.2 million viewers)
  - Game 1 Rangers/Rays (ABC): 1.3 (2.2 million viewers)
  - Game 2 Blue Jays/Twins: 1.1 (2.0 million viewers)
  - Game 2 Diamondbacks/Brewers (ESPN2): 1.1 (1.9 million viewers)
  - Game 1 Diamondbacks/Brewers (ESPN2): 1.1 (1.9 million viewers)
  - Game 1 Blue Jays/Twins: 1.0 (1.7 million viewers)
- 2024 Wild Card Series
  - Game 3 Mets/Brewers: (4.0 million viewers)
  - Game 2 Mets/Brewers: (3.7 million viewers)
  - Game 1 Tigers/Astros (ABC): (3.2 million viewers)
  - Game 2 Tigers/Astros (ABC): (3.0 million viewers)
  - Game 1 Braves/Padres: (2.9 million viewers)
  - Game 1 Mets/Brewers: (2.6 million viewers)
  - Game 2 Royals/Orioles: (2.3 million viewers)
  - Game 2 Braves/Padres (ESPN2): (2.1 million viewers)
  - Game 1 Royals/Orioles (ESPN2): (1.2 million viewers)
- 2025 Wild Card Series
  - Game 3 Red Sox/Yankees: (7.4 million viewers)
  - Game 2 Red Sox/Yankees: (6.8 million viewers)
  - Game 1 Red Sox/Yankees: (6.5 million viewers)
  - Game 2 Reds/Dodgers: (5.5 million viewers)
  - Game 1 Reds/Dodgers: (4.6 million viewers)
  - Game 3 Padres/Cubs: (4.5 million viewers)
  - Game 3 Tigers/Guardians (ABC): (4.1 million viewers)
  - Game 1 Padres/Cubs (ABC): (3.4 million viewers)
  - Game 2 Padres/Cubs (ABC): (3.1 million viewers)
  - Game 1 Tigers/Guardians: (2.6 million viewers)
  - Game 2 Tigers/Guardians: (2.5 million viewers)

== See also ==
- MLB on Fox
- MLB on NBC
- MLB on TBS
- MLB Network
- Friday Night Baseball

Records
Preceded by USA	Major League Baseball pay television carrier 1990–present with TBS (2007–present) with FS1 (2014–present) with Apple TV+ (2022–present) with Peacock/NBCSN (2022–2023 and 2026–present) with The Roku Channel (2024–2025) with Netflix (2026–present)	Succeeded by Incumbent
