= Rick Gentile =

- Born: September 16, 1949 (age 76)
- Education: Queens College; B.A. Sociology
- Occupations: sports program producer and executive
- Known for: Founder, President and Executive Producer of 24 Productions, Inc.
- Title: Seton Hall Sports Poll Director

Rick Gentile (born September 16, 1949) is an American television, radio, and digital media sports program producer and executive. He had been a broadcaster and CBS Sports’ Executive Producer and Senior Vice President. Gentile won 10 Emmy Awards for his work with CBS.

Since September 2005, Gentile has served as the Director of the Seton Hall Sports Poll and is a faculty member of Seton Hall University's Stillman School of Business. The Sports Poll is a national public opinion survey dealing with issues related to the business of sports and its findings have been published by USA Today, Bloomberg News, ESPN, The Associated Press, and various other news organizations, radio and television outlets.

Since November 2013, Gentile has also served as the Senior Associate Commissioner of Broadcasting for The BIG EAST. In that capacity, Gentile works directly with Fox Sports in overseeing the day-to-day operations of the conference broadcast agreement as well as serving as Executive Producer of The Big East digital network.

Gentile is also President and Executive Producer of 24 Productions, Inc. a company he founded. 24 Productions has produced a number of shows for broadcast as well as award-winning DVDs. Formerly, he served as Senior Vice President of Production and Programming at The Football Network, where he was responsible for the acquisition, development, and on-air production of all programming.

During his long tenure at CBS, Gentile served in a number of executive production and programming positions. He was the Vice President of Programming for the Albertville Olympic Winter Games, Senior Vice President of Production, and Executive Producer for the Lillehammer and Nagano Winter Olympics, the former being the highest-rated Olympic broadcast in US history and, at the time, the most watched event of all time event in television history.

At CBS, Gentile also oversaw the production of other major sporting events including two World Series, Two National Football League seasons, five NCAA basketball tournaments, five U.S. Tennis Opens, five seasons of PGA Tour golf, including the Masters Tournament, and countless other sporting events. In 1998, he served as executive producer of the highly rated television docudrama My Sergei, based on figure skater Ekaterina Gordeeva's best-selling book.

Gentile later served as Senior Vice President and Executive Producer of WeMedia Sports. In that capacity he conceived and was responsible for the broadcast (12 hours) and webcast (over 170 hours live on the internet) of the 2000 Summer Paralympics from Sydney, Australia, at the time, the largest streaming video project ever delivered over the internet.

== Awards ==
Over the course of his distinguished career Gentile has received numerous broadcast awards in addition to ten Emmys. He had been a member of the International Olympic Committee's Radio and Television Committee and sat on the International Ski Federation's Television Committee. He is also a member of the Board of Advisors to REZN8, one of the world's animation and design companies, and ad been a member of the New York Chapter of the Baseball Writers' Association of America.

He began his career in sports working as a statistician for the Elias Sports Bureau, the world’s foremost sports historians and statisticians. Gentile continued at the Elias Bureau for 17 years, finishing up his tenure there as a Senior Vice President before moving on to CBS Sports.

== Education ==
Gentile received a Bachelor of Arts degree in Sociology from Queens College and did graduate work in criminal justice at John Jay College.
