= Monday Night Baseball =

Television series

- ABC's Monday Night Baseball logo as used from 1976 to 1981 (1978–81 variant pictured)
- Genre: American baseball game telecasts
- Presented by: Various commentators
- Country of origin: United States
- Original language: English
- No. of seasons: 54 (through 2026 season)

Production
- Production locations: Various MLB stadiums (game telecasts)
- Camera setup: Multi-camera
- Running time: 210 minutes or until game ends (inc. adverts)
- Production companies: Major League Baseball; NBC Sports (1966–1975); ABC Sports (1976–1988); ESPN (1992–2021 and 2026–present)

Original release
- Network: NBC
- Release: May 30, 1966 – September 1, 1975
- Network: ABC
- Release: April 12, 1976 – August 1, 1988
- Network: ESPN
- Release: April 13, 1992 – August 1, 2022
- Release: August 12, 2024
- Network: ESPN; ESPN DTC; ESPN Deportes (Spanish audio/broadcast)
- Release: June 15, 2026 – present

Related
- Baseball Tonight; ESPN Major League Baseball; Major League Baseball on ABC; Major League Baseball on NBC; Wednesday Night Baseball; Sunday Night Baseball; Major League Baseball on ESPN Radio

Monday Night Baseball is an American live game telecast of Major League Baseball (MLB) that airs on Monday nights during the regular season. Earlier incarnations of Monday Night Baseball aired on NBC and then ABC in the 1970s and 1980s. Since 1992, Monday Night Baseball has primarily aired on ESPN.

From 1992 to 2021, games started at 7 p.m. ET on ESPN, following SportsCenter, and usually lasted around three hours leading up to an hour-long Baseball Tonight. The program sometimes aired on ESPN2 rather than ESPN, often due to NBA playoff coverage in April and May, and preseason Monday Night Football coverage in August.

Beginning with the 2022 Major League Baseball season, ESPN significantly reduced their MLB schedule, which included cutting their Monday Night Baseball games. Monday night games now occasionally air on Fox Sports 1 as part of their irregularly scheduled weeknight games, and on MLB Network as part of their MLB Network Showcase package.

== History ==
=== NBC (1966–1975) ===
Monday Night Baseball began on October 19, 1966, when NBC signed a three-year contract to televise the game. Under the deal, NBC paid roughly $6 million per year for the 25 Games of the Week, $6.1 million for the 1967 World Series and 1967 All-Star Game, and $6.5 million for the 1968 World Series and 1968 All-Star Game. This brought the total value of the contract (which included three Monday night telecasts each season) up to $30.6 million.

From 1972–1975 NBC televised Monday games under a contract worth $72 million. In 1973, NBC extended the Monday night telecasts to 15 straight (with a local blackout). September 1, 1975 saw NBC's last Monday Night Baseball game, in which the Montreal Expos beat the Philadelphia Phillies 6–5.

Curt Gowdy called the Monday night games with Tony Kubek from 1972 to 1974, the pair being joined in 1973 and 1974 by various guest commentators from both in and out of the baseball world. Jim Simpson and Maury Wills called the secondary backup games. Joe Garagiola hosted NBC's pregame show, The Baseball World of Joe Garagiola, and teamed with Gowdy to call the games in 1975.

=== ABC (1976–1988) ===
ABC would pick up the television rights for Monday Night Baseball games in the following year. Just like with Monday Night Football, ABC brought in the concept of the three-man-booth (originally composed of Bob Prince, Bob Uecker, and Warner Wolf as the primary crew) to their baseball telecasts.

Ratings were typically poor for ABC's Monday night games, and by 1986, ABC only televised 13 Monday Night Baseball games. This was a fairly sharp contrast to the 18 games to that were scheduled in 1978. The Sporting News suggested that ABC paid Major League Baseball to not make them televise the regular season, opining that the network only wanted the sport for October anyway. For most of its time on ABC, the Monday night games were held on "dead travel days" when few games were scheduled. The team owners liked that arrangement, as the ABC games didn't compete against their stadium box offices and local telecasts. The network, on the other hand, found the arrangement far more complicated; ABC often had only one or two games to pick from for each telecast from a schedule designed by Major League Baseball. While trying to give all of the teams national exposure, ABC ended up with a surplus of games involving games between either small-market teams and/or teams with losing records.

In 1989, the final year of ABC's contract with Major League Baseball, ABC moved the baseball telecasts to Thursday nights in hopes of getting a leg up against NBC's The Cosby Show. The network also aired some late-season games on Sunday afternoons.

=== ESPN (1992–2022, 2024 and 2026–present) ===
ESPN occasionally carried Monday night games after signing television rights deals with MLB in 1990, though the main regular broadcasts were Sunday Night Baseball and the Wednesday Night Baseball doubleheader. The network began carrying Monday night games regularly as part of the eight-year television contract that ESPN signed in 2005, replacing the second Wednesday night game. Unlike Sunday Night Baseball, the game was non-exclusive, meaning it would also be carried by the teams' local broadcasters, and telecasts were typically blacked out in the participating teams' markets.

Because ESPN broadcasts Monday Night Football beginning with pre-season games in mid-August, late season Monday Night Baseball games would either move to ESPN2 or ESPN would broadcast a doubleheader as part of Wednesday Night Baseball. On some occasions, ESPN scheduled two games to air simultaneously, with one game airing on ESPN and the second on ESPN2. Both telecasts were branded with the Wednesday Night Baseball name, but one featured the Monday night announce team.

In 2021, ESPN agreed to a new contract with Major League Baseball through the 2028 season. However, the deal included only around 30 exclusive broadcasts, 25 of which would take place on Sunday Night Baseball, thus ending regular Monday Night Baseball broadcasts. As part of these five non-Sunday games, ESPN did air one Monday Night Baseball game in 2022 and 2024.

On November 19, 2025, ESPN announced a restructured three-year deal with MLB. Under this new deal, ESPN would televise a 30-game schedule primarily on summer weeknights, ending Sunday Night Baseball. For the 2026 season, ESPN announced that 10 games would air on Monday nights.
