= Matt Hollowell =

American baseball umpire (born 1971)

Matthew Stuart Hollowell (born July 12, 1971 in Somerville, New Jersey) is a former vacation umpire in Major League Baseball from 2000 to 2004, filling in for injured or vacationing members of the full-time umpire staff. When not needed at the major league level, he worked in the Pacific Coast League.

He worked his first major league game on August 14, 2000, and his final game on September 30, 2004. He wore number 83 throughout his career.

He was on the umpiring crew scheduled to work the game between the St. Louis Cardinals and Chicago Cubs on June 22, 2002, that was canceled due to the sudden death of Cardinals pitcher Darryl Kile. Hollowell was also the first base umpire in a September 19, 2002, game between the Chicago White Sox and Kansas City Royals. The game was made notable when Kansas City first base coach Tom Gamboa was attacked by William Ligue Jr. and his 15-year-old son, two fans that ran onto the field from the stands, as Hollowell watched and declined to intervene.

Hollowell started the Northeast Umpire Clinic (NEUC), a clinic to train aspiring professional umpires as well as amateur umpires that work youth and high school baseball.

Hollowell attended Albright College, graduating in 1994.

== See also ==
- List of Major League Baseball umpires (disambiguation)
