= List of Major League Baseball prime time television broadcasters =

The first night game in Major League Baseball history occurred on May 24, 1935, when the Cincinnati Reds beat the Philadelphia Phillies 2–1 at Crosley Field. The original plan was that the Reds would play seven night games each season, one against each visiting club. Night baseball quickly found acceptance in other Major League cities and eventually became the norm; the term "day game" was subsequently coined to designate the increasingly rarer afternoon contests.

Monday Night Baseball was born on October 19, 1966, when NBC signed a three-year contract to televise the game. Under the deal, NBC paid roughly $6 million per year for the 25 Games of the Week, $6.1 million for the 1967 World Series and 1967 All-Star Game, and $6.5 million for the 1968 World Series and 1968 All-Star Game. This brought the total value of the contract (which included three Monday night telecasts each season) up to $30.6 million.

The last non-expansion/non-relocated team to play all their home games in the daytime were the Chicago Cubs; they played their first official night game in Wrigley Field on August 9, 1988, and beat the New York Mets 6–4, one night after their initial attempt at night baseball (against the Philadelphia Phillies) was rained out before it became official. The Cubs still play the fewest home night games of any major league club (35 per season, as of 2014).

The first night All-Star Game was held at Philadelphia's Shibe Park in 1943, while the first World Series night game was Game 4 of the 1971 Series at Three Rivers Stadium in Pittsburgh. All All-Star Games since 1969, and all World Series games since Game 6 of the 1987 Series, have been played at night.

== 2020s ==
Year	Network(s)	Play-by-play	Color commentary
2026	NBC	Jason Benetti	Guest commentators
2026	TBS	Brian Anderson; Alex Faust; Brandon Gaudin; Brendan Burke	Ron Darling; Jeff Francoeur
2026	ESPN	Karl Ravech; Jon Sciambi; Joe Buck; Kevin Brown; Mike Monaco; Roxy Bernstein; Mike Monaco	Eduardo Perez; David Ross; Jessica Mendoza; Tim Kurkjian; Doug Glanville; Ben McDonald; Gregg Olson; Adam Ottavino; Todd Frazier
2026	MLB Network	Matt Vasgersian; Paul Severino	Tom Verducci; Eric Hosmer; Yonder Alonso
2026	Apple TV+	Alex Faust; Rich Waltz	Ryan Spilborghs; Dontrelle Willis
2026	Netflix	Matt Vasgersian	Hunter Pence; CC Sabathia
2025	ESPN	Karl Ravech; Jon Sciambi; Roxy Bernstein	David Cone and Eduardo Pérez; Kyle Peterson; Chris Burke; Jessica Mendoza; Tim Kurkjian
2025	TBS	Brian Anderson; Alex Faust; Don Orsillo; Tom McCarthy; Brandon Gaudin	Ron Darling; Jeff Francoeur; Curtis Granderson; Jimmy Rollins
2025	MLB Network	Matt Vasgersian; Paul Severino	Tom Verducci; Dan Plesac; Mark DeRosa; Yonder Alonso
2025	Apple TV+	Alex Faust; Rich Waltz	Ryan Spilborghs; Dontrelle Willis
2024	ESPN	Karl Ravech	David Cone and Eduardo Pérez
2024	TBS	Brian Anderson; Don Orsillo	Jeff Francoeur; Ron Darling
2024	MLB Network	Bob Costas; Matt Vasgersian	Dan Plesac; Tom Verducci
2024	Apple TV+	Wayne Randazzo; Alex Faust	Dontrelle Willis; Ryan Spilborghs
2023	ESPN	Karl Ravech	David Cone and Eduardo Pérez
2023	TBS	Brian Anderson; Bob Costas; Don Orsillo	Ron Darling; Jeff Francoeur
2023	MLB Network	Bob Costas; Matt Vasgersian	Tom Verducci
2023	Apple TV+	Wayne Randazzo; Alex Faust	Dontrelle Willis; Ryan Spilborghs
2022	ESPN	Karl Ravech	David Cone and Eduardo Pérez
2022	TBS	Brian Anderson; Bob Costas; Don Orsillo	Ron Darling; Jeff Francoeur
2022	MLB Network	Bob Costas; Rich Waltz	Tom Verducci
2022	Apple TV+	Melanie Newman; Stephen Nelson	Chris Young and Hannah Keyser; Hunter Pence and Katie Nolan
2021	ESPN	Matt Vasgersian; Jason Benetti; Dave Flemming; Dan Shulman; Jon Sciambi; Karl Ravech	Alex Rodriguez; Buster Olney; Tim Kurkjian; Doug Glanville; Jessica Mendoza; Rick Sutcliffe; Eduardo Pérez; Jeff Passan
2021	MLB Network	Bob Costas; Scott Braun; Stephen Nelson; Matt Vasgersian	Jim Kaat; John Smoltz; Tom Verducci
2020	ESPN	Matt Vasgersian; Karl Ravech; Jon Sciambi; Tom Hart	Alex Rodriguez; Buster Olney; Eduardo Pérez; Tim Kurkjian; Chipper Jones; Rick Sutcliffe; Jessica Mendoza

=== Notes ===
- Starting with the 2022 season, TBS' weekly games were moved from Sunday afternoons to Tuesday nights. The Tuesday night program was expected to include a 30-minute studio show before and after each game.
- On March 29, 2022, MLB announced that Apple TV+'s first Friday night games would air on April 8, 2022, with a doubleheader of New York Mets–Washington Nationals and Houston Astros–Los Angeles Angels as the inaugural matchups. Apple also announced that Friday Night Baseball will be free-of-charge for its first 12 broadcasts.
- For the 2020 season abbreviated due to COVID-19, Matt Vasgersian and Alex Rodriguez would broadcast all games from a studio at ESPN's Bristol, Connecticut, headquarters.

== 2010s ==
Year	Network(s)	Play-by-play	Color commentary
2018	ESPN	Matt Vasgersian; Jon Sciambi; Dave Flemming; Sean McDonough; Steve Levy; Karl Ravech	Alex Rodriguez; Jessica Mendoza; Rick Sutcliffe; Eduardo Perez; David Ross; Tim Kurkjian
2018	MLB Network	Bob Costas; Matt Vasgersian	Jim Kaat; John Smoltz
2017	ESPN	Dan Shulman; Jon Sciambi; Dave O'Brien; Dave Flemming; Sean McDonough; Steve Levy; Karl Ravech	Aaron Boone; Jessica Mendoza; Rick Sutcliffe; Eduardo Perez; Doug Glanville; David Ross; Tim Kurkjian; Dallas Braden
2017	MLB Network	Bob Costas; Matt Vasgersian; Paul Severino	Jim Kaat; John Smoltz; Tom Verducci
2016	ESPN	Dan Shulman; Chris Berman; Jon Sciambi; Dave Flemming; Sean McDonough; Steve Levy; Karl Ravech	Aaron Boone; Jessica Mendoza; Rick Sutcliffe; Eduardo Perez; John Kruk; Curt Schilling; Doug Glanville; Dallas Braden
2016	MLB Network	Bob Costas; Matt Vasgersian; Mike Emrick	Jim Kaat; John Smoltz; Tom Verducci; Harold Reynolds
2015	ESPN	Dan Shulman; Chris Berman; Jon Sciambi; Dave O'Brien; Dave Flemming; Sean McDonough; Steve Levy; Karl Ravech	John Kruk; Curt Schilling; Rick Sutcliffe; Aaron Boone; Doug Glanville; Manny Acta; Mark Mulder; Dallas Braden; Jessica Mendoza
2015	MLB Network	Bob Costas; Matt Vasgersian; Jim Kaat	Jim Kaat; John Smoltz; Tom Verducci; Tim McCarver
2014	ESPN	Dan Shulman; Chris Berman; Jon Sciambi; Dave O'Brien; Sean McDonough; Steve Levy; Karl Ravech	John Kruk; Curt Schilling; Rick Sutcliffe; Aaron Boone; Doug Glanville; Manny Acta; Mark Mulder; Barry Larkin
2014	MLB Network	Bob Costas; Matt Vasgersian; Jim Kaat	Jim Kaat; John Smoltz; Tom Verducci; Bob Uecker
2013	ESPN	Dan Shulman; Chris Berman; Dave O'Brien; Sean McDonough; Jon Sciambi; Steve Levy; Karl Ravech	Orel Hershiser; John Kruk; Rick Sutcliffe; Aaron Boone; Nomar Garciaparra; Doug Glanville; Manny Acta; Curt Schilling; Mark Mulder; Barry Larkin
2013	MLB Network	Bob Costas; Matt Vasgersian; Paul Severino	Jim Kaat; John Smoltz; Tom Verducci; Joe Magrane; Harold Reynolds; Al Leiter; Billy Ripken
2012	ESPN	Dan Shulman; Chris Berman; Dave O'Brien; Sean McDonough; Steve Berthiaume	Orel Hershiser; Terry Francona; Rick Sutcliffe; Aaron Boone; Nomar Garciaparra
2012	MLB Network	Bob Costas; Matt Vasgersian; Brian Kenny	Jim Kaat; John Smoltz; Billy Ripken; Al Leiter
2011	ESPN	Dan Shulman; Chris Berman; Dave O'Brien; Sean McDonough; Steve Berthiaume	Orel Hershiser; Bobby Valentine; Rick Sutcliffe; Aaron Boone; Nomar Garciaparra
2011	MLB Network	Bob Costas; Matt Vasgersian; Rich Waltz; Jim Kaat; Al Michaels	Jim Kaat; John Smoltz; David Cone; Tom Verducci; Sean Casey; Joe Magrane
2010	ESPN	Jon Miller; Chris Berman; Dan Shulman; Dave O'Brien; Steve Berthiaume	Joe Morgan; Orel Hershiser; Rick Sutcliffe; Aaron Boone; Nomar Garciaparra; Chris Singleton
2010	MLB Network	Bob Costas; Matt Vasgersian; Greg Amsinger	Jim Kaat; John Smoltz; Joe Magrane; Mitch Williams; Sean Casey; Harold Reynolds; Tom Verducci; Barry Larkin

=== Notes ===
- In 2010, Jon Miller and Joe Morgan began their 21st consecutive season working together for ESPN. Among U.S. network television sportscasters, only Pat Summerall and John Madden (who called NFL games for CBS and Fox from 1981 to 2001) have had a similar length partnership in the booth. Following the 2010 season, ESPN announced that the television contracts of Miller and Morgan would not be renewed. Miller was offered, but chose to decline, a continued role with ESPN Radio.
  - Steve Phillips joined them for the 2009 season, and Orel Hershiser did so for the 2010 season following Phillips' dismissal by the network.
- Play-by-play announcer Dan Shulman joined color commentators Orel Hershiser and Bobby Valentine as the new Sunday Night Baseball crew beginning in 2011. In an essential trade deal, following the hiring of Valentine as the Boston Red Sox manager, his predecessor Terry Francona was hired to join Shulman and Hershiser for the 2012 season. Francona stayed with ESPN for only one season before he was hired by the Cleveland Indians to be their manager for the 2013 season. Francona was replaced by John Kruk, who had been part of the Baseball Tonight team since 2004. Like Miller and Morgan before them, Shulman and Hershiser also formed the lead team on ESPN Radio's World Series coverage. Prior to the 2014 season, Hershiser left ESPN to become an analyst for the Dodgers on SportsNet LA, and was replaced by Curt Schilling; however, Schilling's subsequent diagnosis of and treatment for an undisclosed form of cancer led to his being unavailable to ESPN for most of the season. Shulman and Kruk worked as a two-man booth until Schilling joined them in September.
- On July 8, 2011, Al Michaels teamed up with Bob Costas (with the two announcers alternating between play-by-play and color commentary) to call a game between the New York Mets and San Francisco Giants on MLB Network. It was Michaels's first appearance on a baseball telecast since August 6, 2003 (when he served as a guest commentator on an ESPN game at Dodger Stadium between the Los Angeles Dodgers and Cincinnati Reds) and his first as a primary announcer since Game 5 of the 1995 World Series on ABC. (Michaels had called Games 1, 4 and 5 of that series with Jim Palmer and Tim McCarver, while Costas called Games 2, 3 and 6 with Joe Morgan and Bob Uecker for NBC.) Michaels and Costas also made appearances on SportsNet New York and Comcast SportsNet Bay Area during the game's middle innings, since the MLB Network broadcast was blacked out in the Mets' and Giants' respective home markets.
- In 2012, Fox would revive the Baseball Night in America title (previously used for The Baseball Network's games) for a series of Saturday night games. Unlike The Baseball Network, Fox did not carry every game that was scheduled for a given Saturday, only choosing five to six games to distribute to its affiliates.
- On August 30, 2015, former softball player Jessica Mendoza joined the Sunday Night Baseball broadcast team as a color commentator. For the 2016 MLB season, former Yankees player Aaron Boone joined Shulman and Mendoza in the broadcast booth as the second color commentator for SNB. Shulman stepped down at the conclusion of the 2017 season, while Boone left the booth after being named new Yankees manager.
- On July 8, 2016, NHL on NBC broadcaster Mike Emrick called his first MLB regular-season game at PNC Park when the Pirates hosted the Chicago Cubs for MLB Network with Bob Costas. The Pirates won the game, 8–4, with Emrick calling some of the action.
- On January 23, 2018, ESPN announced that Alex Rodriguez and Matt Vasgersian would join the SNB crew for the 2018 season as analyst and play-by-play respectively.

== 2000s ==
Year	Network(s)	Play-by-play	Color commentary
2009	ESPN	Jon Miller; Chris Berman; Dan Shulman; Dave O'Brien; Steve Berthiaume	Joe Morgan; Orel Hershiser; Steve Phillips
2009	MLB Network	Bob Costas; Matt Vasgersian; Victor Rojas	Jim Kaat; Harold Reynolds; Joe Magrane; Mitch Williams; Dan Plesac; Clint Hurdle
2008	ESPN	Jon Miller; Chris Berman; Dan Shulman; Dave O'Brien; Steve Berthiaume	Joe Morgan; Orel Hershiser; Steve Phillips
2007	ESPN	Jon Miller; Chris Berman; Dan Shulman; Dave O'Brien; Steve Berthiaume	Joe Morgan; Rick Sutcliffe; Orel Hershiser; Steve Phillips
2006	ESPN	Jon Miller; Chris Berman; Dan Shulman; Dave O'Brien	Joe Morgan; Rick Sutcliffe; Orel Hershiser
2005	ESPN	Jon Miller; Chris Berman; Dan Shulman; Dave O'Brien; Jon Sciambi	Joe Morgan; Buck Martinez; Rick Sutcliffe; Jeff Brantley; Tony Gwynn
2004	ESPN	Jon Miller; Chris Berman; Bob Carpenter; Dan Shulman; Dave O'Brien	Joe Morgan; Buck Martinez; Rick Sutcliffe; Jeff Brantley; Tony Gwynn
2003	ESPN	Jon Miller; Chris Berman; Bob Carpenter; Dan Shulman; Dave O'Brien	Joe Morgan; Buck Martinez; Rick Sutcliffe; Jeff Brantley; Tony Gwynn
2002	ESPN	Jon Miller; Chris Berman; Bob Carpenter; Dan Shulman	Joe Morgan; Dave Campbell; Buck Martinez; Rick Sutcliffe; Jeff Brantley; Tony Gwynn
2001	ESPN	Jon Miller; Chris Berman; Bob Carpenter; Dan Shulman	Joe Morgan; Dave Campbell; Orel Hershiser
2001	FX/FSN	Kenny Albert; Josh Lewin; Steve Physioc; Matt Vasgersian; Joel Meyers; Tom Paciorek; Duane Kuiper	Kevin Kennedy; Rick Manning; Rod Allen; Keith Hernandez; George Frazier; Steve Lyons; Ray Fosse; Jay Johnstone; Kirk Gibson; Mike Krukow; John Kruk
2000	ESPN	Jon Miller; Chris Berman; Bob Carpenter; Dan Shulman	Joe Morgan; Dave Campbell; Buck Martinez
2000	FX/FSN	Kenny Albert; Josh Lewin; Steve Physioc; Matt Vasgersian; Rich Waltz; Chip Caray; Greg Papa	Jeff Torborg; Kevin Kennedy; Ken Brett; Steve Lyons; Bob Brenly; John Cerutti; Ray Fosse

=== Notes ===
- In 2000, as part of an exclusive contract Fox signed with MLB, that coverage passed to Fox Family Channel and was reduced to one game per week. After the 2000 season, Fox also gained rights to the entire postseason and moved a large portion of its Division Series coverage to Fox Family. This lasted for one season due to The Walt Disney Company making a bid for Fox Family. As part of the negotiations Fox Family was renamed ABC Family and ESPN gained the rights to Fox Family and FX's MLB coverage, although the 2002 Division Series aired on ABC Family due to contractual issues, but with ESPN production, a sign of things to come at ABC Sports. Control of the overall contract remained with Fox, meaning they could renegotiate following the 2006 season and not allow ESPN to retain its postseason coverage. For the 2007 season, Fox did exactly that, and TBS is now the cable home of the postseason as part of its new baseball contract.
  - For the 2000 and 2001 seasons, the Fox network's then-sister cable channel, Fox Family (later ABC Family, now Freeform) carried a weekly Major League Baseball game on Thursday nights (a game that had previously aired nationwide on Fox Sports Net from 1997 to 1999), as well as select postseason games from the Division Series. Among the noteworthy games that aired on Fox Family was the October 4, 2001, game between the San Francisco Giants and the Houston Astros, during which Barry Bonds hit his 70th home run of the season, which tied the all-time single season record that Mark McGwire had set only three years earlier (Bonds broke the record the next night). Meanwhile, the Fox Broadcasting Company's other sister cable channel FX, aired numerous Saturday night Major League Baseball contests in 2001, including Cal Ripken Jr.'s final game at Camden Yards. FX also aired one game in the Major League Baseball postseason each year from 2001 to 2005, on the first Wednesday night of League Championship Series week when the league scheduled two games at the same time. On that night, Fox distributed one game to local affiliates with the availability of coverage being based on region, and the other game aired on the corresponding cable affiliate of FX, the main DirecTV or Dish Network channel, or an alternate channel on the satellite providers.
  - As part of its 2001 purchase of Fox Family, in addition to rights to the Thursday night game, The Walt Disney Company acquired the MLB rights that were also held by FX. Those two game packages were moved to ESPN beginning with the 2002 baseball season; however, the playoff games remained on ABC Family for one additional year due to contractual issues. A deal was reached to move those playoff games to ESPN, which produced the games for ABC Family, starting with the 2003 season. Although the games aired on networks owned by Disney, Fox kept the exclusive negotiation rights to renew the contract after the 2006 season. Fox chose not to renew its rights to the Division Series, which went to TBS as part of its new baseball contract.
  - From 2000 to 2005, ESPN's Wednesday night broadcasts consisted of a doubleheader, usually airing the first game at 7pm ET on ESPN and the second at 10pm ET on ESPN2. The second part of the doubleheader was discontinued after 2005 season.
- ESPN Thursday Night Baseball aired on either ESPN or ESPN2 from 2003 to 2006 and featured one game per week. It aired every Thursday at either 1 p.m. ET, 7 p.m. ET, 7:30 p.m. ET or 8:00 ET. Castrol served as the presenting sponsor for the telecasts. The play-by-play commentator was Chris Berman along with either Joe Morgan or Eric Karros as color commentator. In 2006, Duke Castiglione joined the broadcast as the field reporter. ESPN Thursday Night Baseball was discontinued after the 2006 season because the broadcast rights to the package were lost to TBS. TBS shows the games on Sunday afternoons that ESPN previously aired on Thursday nights. The games were then moved to ESPN and ESPN2. Thursday Night Baseball was replaced with MLS Primetime Thursday.
- On April 9, 2009, MLB Network aired its first ever self-produced live baseball telecast. The network typically produces 26 non-exclusive live games a year during the regular season. And since one or both teams' local television rights holders also carry the games, the MLB Network feed is subject to local blackouts. In that event, the cities in the blacked-out markets will instead see a simulcast of another scheduled game via one team's local television rights holder.
  - Longtime NBC Sports broadcaster Bob Costas is one of the play-by-play voices of the broadcasts. Matt Vasgersian also does play-by-play on some games. Jim Kaat, John Smoltz, and Tom Verducci provide color commentary. The network produces 26 non-exclusive live games a year during baseball season and since 2012 two League Division Series games. Since one or both teams' local television rights holders also carry the games, the MLB Network feed is subject to local blackouts. In that event, the cities in the blacked-out markets will instead see a simulcast of another scheduled game via one team's local television rights holder. MLB Network Showcase typically airs on Tuesday, Thursday or Friday nights.
  - From 2009 to 2010, MLB Network broadcast the Civil Rights Game. The 2009 game was broadcast on MLB Network except in the home markets of the two teams that played in the game, Cincinnati (FSN Ohio) and Chicago (CSN Chicago). For the 2010 Civil Rights Game, again, MLB Network telecast the game except in Cincinnati (Fox Sports Ohio) and St. Louis (Fox Sports Midwest).

== 1990s ==
Year	Network(s)	Play-by-play	Color commentary
1999	ESPN	Jon Miller; Chris Berman; Bob Carpenter; Dan Shulman	Joe Morgan; Dave Campbell; Buck Martinez
1999	FX/FSN	Kenny Albert; Josh Lewin; Steve Physioc; Bob Davis; Matt Vasgersian; John Sanders; Dave Armstrong	Jeff Torborg; Kevin Kennedy; Rex Hudler; Ken Brett; Rick Manning
1998	ESPN	Jon Miller; Chris Berman; Bob Carpenter; Dan Shulman	Joe Morgan; Dave Campbell; Buck Martinez
1998	FX/FSN	Kenny Albert; Thom Brennaman; Chip Caray; Steve Physioc; Josh Lewin; Drew Goodman; Dick Stockton; Greg Papa	Jeff Torborg; Bob Brenly; Steve Lyons; Rick Cerone; Ken Brett
1997	ESPN	Jon Miller; Chris Berman; Bob Carpenter; Dan Shulman	Joe Morgan; Dave Campbell; Buck Martinez
1997	FX/FSN	Kenny Albert; Thom Brennaman; Chip Caray; Steve Physioc; Drew Goodman	Jeff Torborg; Bob Brenly; Steve Lyons
1996	ESPN	Jon Miller; Chris Berman; Bob Carpenter; Dan Shulman	Joe Morgan; Dave Campbell; Buck Martinez
1995	ABC	Al Michaels; Brent Musburger	Jim Palmer and Tim McCarver; Jim Kaat
1995	NBC	Bob Costas; Greg Gumbel	Bob Uecker; Joe Morgan
1995	ESPN	Jon Miller; Chris Berman; Bob Carpenter; Dan Shulman	Joe Morgan; Dave Campbell; Buck Martinez
1994	ABC	Al Michaels	Jim Palmer and Tim McCarver
1994	ESPN	Jon Miller; Chris Berman; Bob Carpenter	Joe Morgan; Dave Campbell; Buck Martinez
1993	ESPN	Jon Miller; Chris Berman; Bob Carpenter; Gary Thorne	Joe Morgan; Dave Campbell; Buck Martinez; Tommy Hutton; Larry Sorenson
1992	ESPN	Jon Miller; Chris Berman; Bob Carpenter; Tom Mees	Joe Morgan; Dave Campbell; Buck Martinez; Tommy Hutton; Larry Sorenson
1991	ESPN	Jon Miller; Chris Berman; Bob Carpenter	Joe Morgan; Dave Campbell
1990	ESPN	Jon Miller; Chris Berman; Bob Carpenter	Joe Morgan; Dave Campbell

=== Notes ===
- On January 5, 1989, Major League Baseball signed a $400 million deal with ESPN, who would show over 175 games beginning in 1990. For the next four years, ESPN would televise six games a week (Sunday Night Baseball, Wednesday Night Baseball and doubleheaders on Tuesdays and Fridays), as well as multiple games on Opening Day, Memorial Day, Independence Day, and Labor Day. Unlike ESPN's Sunday Night Baseball, Monday Night Baseball is not exclusive, but unlike Wednesday Night Baseball, Monday Night Baseball since 2007 co-exists with the local markets' carriers and is not always subject to blackout; ESPN can show teams up to three times a year in local markets alongside the local broadcasts.
- For CBS' coverage of the 1991 All-Star Game from Toronto, CBS started their broadcast at the top of the hour with the customary pregame coverage. And then, because American President George H.W. Bush and Canadian Prime Minister Brian Mulroney were throwing out the first ball, there was a slight delay from the 8:30 p.m. EDT start. The game eventually started about 15–20 minutes late. Presumably this, along with CBS' low ratings for baseball, and the costs of doing pregame coverage, led to them starting the prime time broadcasts at 8:30 for the final two years of the contract, with little or no pregame content.
  - In 1991, CBS didn't come on the air for baseball for weeknight LCS telecasts until 8:30 p.m. ET. Instead, they opted to show programming such as Rescue 911 at 8 p.m. rather than a baseball pregame show.
  - As CBS' baseball coverage progressed, CBS dropped its 8:00 p.m. pregame coverage (in favor of airing sitcoms such as Evening Shade), before finally starting their coverage at 8:30 p.m. Eastern Time. The first pitch would generally arrive at approximately 8:45 p.m. Perhaps as a result, Joe Carter's World Series clinching home run off Mitch Williams in 1993, occurred at 12 a.m. on the East Coast.
- In 1994, ABC and NBC began a package included coverage of games in prime time on selected nights throughout the regular season (under the branding Baseball Night in America), along with coverage of the postseason and the World Series. Unlike previous broadcasting arrangements with the league, there was no national "game of the week" during the regular season; these would be replaced by multiple weekly regional telecasts on certain nights of the week. Additionally, The Baseball Network had exclusive coverage windows; no other broadcaster could televise MLB games during the same night that The Baseball Network was televising games.
  - After the All-Star Game was complete, ABC took over coverage with what was to be their weekly slate of games. ABC was scheduled to televise six regular season games on Saturdays or Mondays in prime time. NBC would then pick up where ABC left off by televising six more regular season Friday night games. Every Baseball Night in America game was scheduled to begin at 8 p.m. Eastern Time (or 8 p.m. Pacific Time if the game occurred on the West Coast). A single starting time gave the networks the opportunity to broadcast one game and then, simultaneously, cut to another game when there was a break in action.
  - The networks had exclusive rights for the twelve regular season dates, in that no regional or national cable service (such as ESPN or superstations like Chicago's WGN-TV or Atlanta's WTBS) or over-the-air broadcaster was allowed to telecast a Major League Baseball game on those dates. Baseball Night in America (which premiered on July 16, 1994) usually aired up to fourteen games based on the viewers' region (affiliates chose games of local interest to carry) as opposed to a traditional coast-to-coast format. Normally, announcers who represented each of the teams playing in the respective games were paired with each other. More specifically, on regional Saturday night broadcasts and all non-"national" broadcasts, TBN let the two lead announcers from the opposing teams call the games involving their teams together.
  - Games involving either of the two Canadian-based MLB teams at the time, the Toronto Blue Jays and Montreal Expos, were not always included in the Baseball Night in America package. Canadian rightsholders were allowed to broadcast the games. When TSN (which owned the cable rights to the Blue Jays and Expos) covered the games in Canada, they re-broadcast the BNIA feed across their network. Typically, if the Blue Jays were idle for the day, the Expos would be featured on TSN. Also, CBET (the CBC affiliate in Windsor, Ontario) would air Blue Jays games if the Detroit Tigers were not playing at home that night or if the Blue Jays were scheduled to play in Detroit. Whether or not the game would air in the opposing team's market would depend on which time zone they were from, or if they shared a market with another team.
  - All of the 1994 games aired on ABC; due to the strike NBC was unable to air its slate of games, which were supposed to begin on August 26.
- From 1996-2000, NBC aired LDS games on Tuesday/Friday/Saturday nights. Fox aired LDS games on Wednesday/Thursday nights, Saturdays in the late afternoon, plus Sunday/Monday nights (if necessary). Meanwhile, ESPN carried many afternoon LDS contests. At this point, all playoff games were nationally televised (mostly in unopposed timeslots).
- For Game 2 of the 1996 World Series (rescheduled to Monday night due to a rainout), Fox used an early start (7 p.m. Eastern Time) to minimize the overlap with Monday Night Football on ABC.
- In 1997, as part of the contract with Major League Baseball it had signed the year before, Fox gained an additional outlet for its coverage. Its recently launched cable sports network, Fox Sports Net, was given rights to two Thursday night games per week, one for the Eastern and Central time zones and one for the Mountain and Pacific time zones.
  - Play-by-play announcers for the FSN/Fox Family coverage included Kenny Albert, Thom Brennaman, Chip Caray, Josh Lewin, and Steve Physioc. Color analysts included Bob Brenly, Kevin Kennedy, Steve Lyons, and Jeff Torborg. Occasionally FSN would simulcast a local-team feed of a game from one of its affiliated regional sports networks in lieu of a dedicated national production.
- As part of its coverage of Mark McGwire's bid to break Roger Maris's single-season home run record in 1998, Fox aired a Sunday afternoon game between the Cincinnati Reds and St. Louis Cardinals on September 6 and a Tuesday night game between the Chicago Cubs and the Cardinals on September 8 of that year (McGwire hit his record-breaking 62nd home run of the season in the latter game, which earned a 14.5 rating share for Fox, and remains Fox's highest-rated regular season Major League Baseball telecast to this day).
- In 1999, Bob Costas teamed with his then-NBC colleague Joe Morgan to call two weekday night telecasts for ESPN. The first was on Wednesday, August 25 with Detroit Tigers playing against the Seattle Mariners. The second was on Tuesday, September 21 with the Atlanta Braves playing against the New York Mets.

== 1980s ==
Year	Network(s)	Play-by-play	Color commentary
1989	ABC	Al Michaels; Gary Thorne	Jim Palmer and Tim McCarver; Joe Morgan
1988	ABC	Al Michaels; Gary Bender	Jim Palmer and Tim McCarver; Joe Morgan
1987	ABC	Al Michaels; Gary Bender	Jim Palmer; Tim McCarver
1986	ABC	Al Michaels; Keith Jackson; Don Drysdale	Jim Palmer; Tim McCarver; Johnny Bench or Steve Busby
1985	ABC	Al Michaels; Don Drysdale; Tim McCarver	Jim Palmer and Howard Cosell; Tim McCarver; Tommy John
1984	ABC	Al Michaels; Don Drysdale	Earl Weaver and Howard Cosell or Jim Palmer; Tim McCarver
1983	ABC	Al Michaels; Don Drysdale; Don Chevrier	Earl Weaver and Howard Cosell; Steve Stone
1983	USA	Eddie Doucette; Monte Moore; Al Albert	Nellie Briles; Wes Parker
1982	ABC	Keith Jackson; Al Michaels; Don Drysdale	Don Drysdale and Howard Cosell; Bob Uecker and Steve Stone
1982	USA	Eddie Doucette; Monte Moore	Nellie Briles; Wes Parker
1981	ABC	Keith Jackson; Al Michaels	Don Drysdale and Howard Cosell; Bob Uecker
1981	USA	Jim Woods; Monte Moore; Ned Martin	Nellie Briles; Wes Parker; Bob Prince
1980	ABC	Al Michaels; Keith Jackson	Don Drysdale and Howard Cosell; Bob Uecker and Lou Brock
1980	USA	Jim Woods; Monte Moore	Nellie Briles; Maury Wills; Rico Petrocelli; Steve Grad

=== Notes ===
- USA's coverage became a casualty of the new $1.2 billion television contract between Major League Baseball, ABC and NBC beginning in 1984 and lasting through 1989. One of the provisions to the new deal was that local telecasts opposite network games had to be eliminated.
- NBC also would normally television two prime time games during the regular season (not including All-Star Games). Generally, NBC would broadcast one game on a Tuesday and the other on a Friday. They however, would have to compete against local teams' over-the-air broadcasts, putting NBC at risk of hampering its ratings.
- The 1984 NLCS schedule (which had an off day after Game 3 rather than Game 2) allowed ABC to have a prime time game each weeknight even though Chicago's Wrigley Field did not have lights at the time (which remained the case until four years later).
  - Had the 1984 ALCS between the Detroit Tigers and Kansas City Royals gone the full five games (the last year that the League Championship Series was a best-of-five series), Game 5 on Sunday October 7, would have been a 1 p.m. ET time start instead of being in prime time. This would have happened because one of the presidential debates between Ronald Reagan and Walter Mondale was scheduled for that night. In return, ABC was going to broadcast the debates instead of a baseball game in prime time. Al Trautwig interviewed the Detroit Tigers from their clubhouse following their pennant clinching victory in Game 3.
- Game 5 of the 1984 World Series at Detroit's Tiger Stadium had a starting time of 4:45 p.m. ET, following a 1:30 p.m. start for Game 4. These were the last outdoor World Series games to start earlier than prime time in the eastern United States (Game 6 in 1987, the last daytime World Series contest, was indoors at the Hubert H. Humphrey Metrodome in Minneapolis).
- On Thursday, October 10, 1985, NBC didn't come on the air for Game 2 of the NLCS until 8:30 p.m. ET to avoid disrupting The Cosby Show at 8 (similarly to how the network aired the soap opera Return to Peyton Place, before Game 5 of the 1972 World Series, rather than a pre-game show). NBC would do the same thing for Thursday night games in subsequent postseasons.
- In 1985, ABC announced that every game of the World Series would be played under the lights for the biggest baseball audience possible.
- By 1986, ABC only televised 13 Monday Night Baseball games. This was a fairly sharp contrast to the 18 games to that were scheduled in 1978. Going into 1987, ABC had reportedly purchased 20 Monday night games but only used eight of those slots.
- NBC's broadcast of Game 7 of the 1986 World Series (which went up against a Monday Night Football game between the Washington Redskins and New York Giants on ABC) garnered a Nielsen rating of 38.9 and a 55 share, making it the highest-rated single World Series game to date. Game 7 had been scheduled for Sunday, but a rain-out forced the game to Monday. NBC's telecast of the Series ended with the song "Limelight" from Stereotomy, penultimate album of The Alan Parsons Project.
- Although Al Michaels, Jim Palmer and Tim McCarver had done the 1985 and 1987 World Series together as well as the 1986 All-Star Game, ABC did not team them on a regular basis on Monday Night Baseball until 1988 (after three 'experiments' in 1987).
- On August 9, 1988, NBC as special prime time edition of the Game of the Week, broadcasts the first official night game at Chicago's Wrigley Field between the Cubs and New York Mets. Vin Scully and Joe Garagiola called the game from Chicago while Bob Costas and Tony Kubek called the secondary game between the Los Angeles Dodgers and Cincinnati Reds from Cincinnati's Riverfront Stadium.
- ABC's coverage of Game 2 of the 1988 NLCS didn't start until 10 p.m. ET due to a presidential debate. This is the latest ever scheduled start for an LCS game.
- Game 6 of the 1988 World Series, was scheduled to start at 5 p.m. ET on Saturday, October 22, but that game wasn't necessary. This is the last time a World Series game was scheduled outside of prime time.
- In 1989 (the final year of ABC's contract with Major League Baseball), ABC moved the baseball telecasts to Thursday nights in hopes of getting leg up against NBC's Cosby Show.
  - Game 3 of the 1989 World Series (initially scheduled for October 17) was delayed by 10 days due to the Loma Prieta earthquake. The earthquake struck at approximately 5:04 p.m. Pacific Time. After about a 15-minute delay (ABC aired a rerun of Roseanne and subsequently, The Wonder Years in the meantime), ABC was able to regain power via a backup generator.

== 1970s ==
Year	Network(s)	Play-by-play	Color commentary
1979	ABC	Keith Jackson; Al Michaels	Don Drysdale and Howard Cosell; Bob Uecker
1979	USA	Jim Woods; Monte Moore; Bob Prince	Bud Harrelson; Maury Wills; Nellie Briles
1978	ABC	Keith Jackson; Al Michaels; Jim Lampley	Don Drysdale and Howard Cosell; Bob Uecker; Bill White
1977	ABC	Keith Jackson; Al Michaels; Warner Wolf	Bob Uecker and Howard Cosell; Bill White; Bob Gibson
1976	ABC	Bob Prince; Al Michaels	Bob Uecker and Warner Wolf; Bob Gibson and Norm Cash
1975	NBC	Curt Gowdy; Jim Simpson; Joe Garagiola	Maury Wills
1974	NBC	Curt Gowdy; Jim Simpson; Bill O'Donnell	Tony Kubek; Maury Wills
1973	NBC	Curt Gowdy; Jim Simpson	Tony Kubek; Maury Wills
1972	NBC	Curt Gowdy; Jim Simpson	Tony Kubek; Sandy Koufax
1971	NBC	Curt Gowdy; Jim Simpson	Tony Kubek; Sandy Koufax
1970	NBC	Curt Gowdy; Jim Simpson	Tony Kubek; Sandy Koufax

=== Notes ===
- On October 13, 1971, the World Series held a night game for the very first time. Commissioner Bowie Kuhn, who felt that baseball could attract a larger audience by featuring a prime time telecast (as opposed to a mid-afternoon broadcast, occurring when most fans either worked or attended school), pitched the idea to NBC. An estimated 61 million people watched Game 4 on NBC; television ratings for a World Series game during the daytime hours would not have approached such a record number.
  - For World Series night games, NBC normally began baseball coverage at 8:00 p.m. Eastern Time with a pre-game show (with first pitch occurring around 8:20 to 8:25 p.m.). However, in 1986 and 1988, for Game 5 of the World Series (on Thursday night), NBC's coverage did not begin until 8:30. This allowed the network to air its highly rated sitcom The Cosby Show in its normal Thursday 8:00 p.m. timeslot. NBC went with carrying a very short pre-game show and got to first pitch at around 8:40 p.m. Eastern Time.
- In 1972, NBC began televising prime time regular-season games on Mondays, under a four-year contract worth $72 million. In 1973, NBC extended the Monday night telecasts (with a local blackout) to 15 consecutive games. NBC's last Monday Night Baseball game aired on September 1, 1975, in which the Montreal Expos beat the Philadelphia Phillies, 6–5. Curt Gowdy called the games with Tony Kubek from 1972 to 1974, being joined in the 1973 and 1974 seasons by various guest commentators from both within and outside of the baseball world (among them Dizzy Dean, Joe DiMaggio, Satchel Paige, Bobby Riggs, Dave DeBusschere, Howard Cosell, Mel Allen, Danny Kaye and Willie Mays). Jim Simpson and Maury Wills called the secondary backup games. Joe Garagiola hosted the pre-game show, The Baseball World of Joe Garagiola, and teamed with Gowdy to call the games in 1975.
- During NBC's telecast of the Monday night Dodgers–Braves game on April 8, 1974, in which Hank Aaron hit his record-breaking 715th career home run, Kubek criticized Commissioner Bowie Kuhn on-air for failing to be in attendance at Fulton County Stadium in Atlanta on that historic night; Kuhn argued that he had a prior engagement that he could not break.
- Starting in 1975, Joe Garagiola and Curt Gowdy alternated as the Saturday Game of Week play-by-play announcers with Tony Kubek doing color analysis. Then on weeks in which NBC had Monday Night Baseball, Gowdy and Garagiola worked together. One would call play-by-play for 4½ innings, the other would handle color analysis. Then in the bottom of the 5th inning, their roles switched.
- In 1976, ABC picked up the television rights for Monday Night Baseball games from NBC. For most of its time on ABC, the Monday night games were held on "dead travel days" when few games were scheduled. The team owners liked that arrangement as the national telecasts didn't compete against their stadium box offices. ABC on the other hand, found the arrangement far more complicated. ABC often had only one or two games to pick from for each telecast from a schedule designed by Major League Baseball. While trying to give all of the teams national exposure, ABC ended up with far too many games between sub .500 clubs from small markets.
- For Game 2 of the 1976 World Series, NBC and Major League Baseball experimented with a Sunday night telecast.
- In 1979, the start of ABC's Monday Night Baseball coverage was moved back to June, due to poor ratings during the May sweeps period. In place of April and May prime time games, ABC began airing Sunday Afternoon Baseball games in September. The network also aired one Friday night game (Yankees at Angels) on July 13 of that year.
  - In 1979, 22 teams (all but the Atlanta Braves, Houston Astros, New York Mets, and St. Louis Cardinals) participated in a one-year cable deal with United Artists Television and Columbia Pictures Television, then-owners of the USA Network. The deal involved the airing of a Thursday night Game of the Week in markets at least 50 miles (80 km) from a major league park. The deal earned Major League Baseball less than $500,000, but led to a new two-year contract for 40–45 games per season. The program ran through the 1983 season. With USA's Thursday night coverage, it ended ABC's Monday night broadcast's position as the exclusive national, prime time television franchise for Major League Baseball.
  - The second game of the night was typically broadcast from the West Coast. The games were usually blacked-out in the competing teams' cities. Once in a while, when USA aired a repeat of the telecast late at night, local cities were allowed to show the rerun.

== 1960s ==
Year	Network(s)	Play-by-play	Color commentary
1969	NBC	Curt Gowdy; Jim Simpson	Tony Kubek; Sandy Koufax
1968	NBC	Curt Gowdy; Jim Simpson	Pee Wee Reese and Sandy Koufax; Tony Kubek
1967	NBC	Curt Gowdy	Pee Wee Reese and Sandy Koufax

=== Notes ===
- Despite temporarily losing the Game of the Week package in 1961, ABC still televised several games in prime time (with Jack Buck returning to call the action). This occurred as Roger Maris was poised to tie and subsequently break Babe Ruth's regular season home run record of 60. As with all Major League Baseball games in those days, the action was totally blacked out of major league markets. As a matter of fact, as documented in the HBO film 61*, the Maris family was welcomed into ABC's Kansas City, Missouri, affiliate KMBC-TV so they could watch the in-house feed of the game, which was blacked out of Kansas City.
  - On September 20, 1961, Bob Neal and Hank Greenberg called a baseball game for ABC in prime time between the New York Yankees and Baltimore Orioles.
- The 1967 All-Star Game in Anaheim can be considered the first "prime time" telecast of a Major League Baseball All-Star Game. The game started at approximately 7:00 p.m. on the East Coast.
  - Sports Illustrated, noting that the game “began at 4 p.m. in California and ended at 11 p.m. Eastern Daylight Time,” reported “an estimated 55 million people watched the game, compared with 12 million viewers for the 1966 All-Star Game, played in the afternoon.”
  - The 1969 game was originally scheduled for the evening of Tuesday, July 22, but heavy rains forced its postponement to the following afternoon. As of 2022, the 1969 contest remains the last All-Star Game to date to be played earlier than prime time in the Eastern United States.

== See also ==
- List of Major League Baseball on NBC broadcasters
- List of Major League Baseball on ABC announcers
- List of ESPN Major League Baseball broadcasters
- The Baseball Network announcers
- List of Major League Baseball on Fox broadcasters
- List of MLB Network personalities
- List of Major League Baseball Game of the Week broadcasters
- List of current Major League Baseball announcers
