= History of Major League Baseball on ABC =

The following article details the history of Major League Baseball on ABC, the broadcast of Major League Baseball games on the ABC television network.

== 1950s ==
In 1953, ABC executive Edgar J. Scherick (who later created Wide World of Sports) broached a Saturday Game of the Week, sports television's first network series. At the time, ABC was labeled a "nothing network" that had fewer outlets than CBS or NBC. ABC also needed paid programming or "anything for bills" as Scherick put it. At first, ABC hesitated at the idea of a nationally televised regular season baseball program. ABC wondered how exactly the Game of the Week would reach television in the first place and who would notice if it did? Also, Major League Baseball barred the Game of the Week from airing within 50 miles of any ballpark. Major League Baseball according to Scherick, insisted on protecting local coverage and didn't care about national appeal. ABC, though, did care about the national appeal and claimed that "most of America was still up for grabs."

In April 1953, Edgar Scherick set out to acquire teams rights but instead, only got the Philadelphia Athletics, Cleveland Indians, and Chicago White Sox to sign on. These were not "national" broadcast contracts since they were assembled through negotiations with individual teams to telecast games from their home parks. It was until the Sports Broadcasting Act of 1961, that antitrust laws barred "pooled rights" television contracts negotiated with a central league broadcasting authority.

In 1953, ABC earned an 11.4 rating for its Game of the Week telecasts. Blacked-out cities had 32% of households. In the rest of the United States, 3 in 4 television sets in use watched Dizzy Dean and Buddy Blattner (or backup announcers Bill McColgan and Bob Finnegan) call the games for ABC. CBS took over the Saturday Game in 1955 (the rights were actually set up through the Falstaff Brewing Corporation) retaining Dean/Blattner and McColgan/Finnegan as the announcing crews (as well as Gene Kirby, who produced the Dean/Blattner games and alternated with them on play-by-play) and adding Sunday coverage in 1957. As Edgar Scherick said, "In '53, no one wanted us. Now teams begged for "Game"'s cash."

In 1959, ABC broadcast the best-of-three playoff series (to decide the National League pennant) between the Milwaukee Braves and Los Angeles Dodgers. The cigarette company L&M sponsored the telecasts. George Kell and Bob DeLaney were the announcers. ABC Radio also broadcast the playoff series with Bob Finnegan and Tony Flynn announcing.

== 1960s ==
=== 1960–1961 ===
In 1960, ABC returned to baseball broadcasting with a series of late-afternoon Saturday games. Jack Buck and Carl Erskine were the lead announcing crew for this series (branded on air, as Big League Baseball), which lasted one season. ABC typically did three games a week. Two of the games were always from the Eastern or Central Time Zone. The late games (no doubleheaders) were usually San Francisco Giants or Los Angeles Dodgers' home games. However, the Milwaukee Braves used to start many of their Saturday home games late in the afternoon. So if the Giants and Dodgers were both on the road at the same time, ABC still would be able to show a late game.

One other note about ABC baseball coverage during this period. Despite temporarily losing the Game of the Week package in 1961, ABC still televised several games in prime time (with Jack Buck returning to call the action). This occurred as Roger Maris was poised to tie and subsequently break Babe Ruth's regular season home run record of 60. As with all Major League Baseball games in those days, the action was totally blacked out of major league markets. As a matter of fact, as documented in the HBO film 61*, the Maris family was welcomed into ABC's Kansas City, Missouri affiliate KMBC-TV so they could watch the in-house feed of the game, which was blacked out of Kansas City.

On September 20, 1961, Bob Neal and Hank Greenberg called a baseball game for ABC in prime time between Maris' New York Yankees and the Baltimore Orioles.

=== 1965 ===
In 1965, ABC provided the first-ever nationwide baseball coverage with weekly Saturday broadcasts on a regional basis. ABC paid $5.7 million for the rights to the 28 Saturday/holiday Games of the Week. ABC's deal covered all of the teams except the New York Yankees and Philadelphia Phillies (who had their own television deals) and called for two regionalized games on Saturdays, Independence Day, and Labor Day. Each Saturday, ABC broadcast two 2 p.m. games and one 5 p.m. game for the Pacific Time Zone. ABC blacked out the games in the home cities of the clubs playing those games. Major League Baseball however, had a television deal with NBC for the All-Star Game and World Series. At the end of the season, ABC declined to exercise its $6.5 million option for 1966, citing poor ratings, especially in New York.

According to ABC announcer Merle Harmon's profile in Curt Smith's book Voices of Summer, in 1965, CBS' Yankee Game of the Week beat ABC in the ratings in at least Dallas and Des Moines. To make matters worse, local television split the big-city audience. Therefore, ABC could show the Cubs vs. the Cardinals in the New York market, yet the Mets would still kill them in terms of viewership. Harmon, Chris Schenkel, Keith Jackson, and (on occasion) Ken Coleman served as ABC's principal play-by-play voices for this series. Also on the network's announcing team were pregame host Howard Cosell and color commentators Leo Durocher, Tommy Henrich, Warren Spahn (who worked with Chris Schenkel on a July 17, Baltimore-Detroit contest), and Hall of Fame Brooklyn Dodger great Jackie Robinson (who, on April 17, 1965, became the first black network broadcaster for Major League Baseball). According to ABC Sports producer Chuck Howard, "(Robinson) had a high, stabbing voice, great presence, and sharp mind. All he lacked was time."

The announcing duos were generally, Chris Schenkel-Leo Durocher and Merle Harmon-Jackie Robinson. For instance, the team of Schenkel and Durocher called the San Francisco-New York Mets contest on April 17, Milwaukee-Pittsburgh contest on August 21, and the San Francisco-Los Angeles (alongside Jackie Robinson) on September 6. The San Francisco-Los Angeles game on Labor Day was the first meeting between those two clubs since a melee from about two weeks prior involving Giants pitcher Juan Marichal cracking Dodgers catcher John Roseboro on the head during a brawl. Jackie Robinson worked with Merle Harmon on at least, the St. Louis-Cincinnati contest on April 24.

It was around this time that ABC suggested that Major League Baseball reduce their regular season schedule to just 60 games. ABC wanted the games to only be played on weekends. They also wanted to promote baseball in the same manner as football, as a major television event.

== 1970s ==
In March 1975, Commissioner Bowie Kuhn announced that ABC would join NBC in a new deal with Major League Baseball. The rights fees paid by the two networks were 29.3% higher than what MLB got in the 1971 deal, but adjusted for inflation, the money in the new deal was about the same as in the old one. Under the initial agreement (1976–1979), both networks paid $92.8 million.

ABC paid $12.5 million per year to show 16 Monday night games in 1976, 18 in the next three years, plus half the postseason (both League Championship Series in even numbered years and World Series in odd numbered years) and the All-Star Game in even numbered years. NBC paid $10.7 million per year to show 25 Saturday Games of the Week and the other half of the postseason (both League Championship Series in odd numbered years and World Series in even numbered years) and the All-Star Game in odd numbered years.

=== 1976–1977 ===
ABC also picked up the television rights for Monday Night Baseball beginning in 1976. For most of its time on ABC, the Monday night games were held on "dead travel days" when few games were scheduled. The team owners liked that arrangement as the national telecasts didn't compete against their stadium box offices. ABC on the other hand, found the arrangement far more complicated. ABC often had only one or two games to pick from for each telecast from a schedule designed by Major League Baseball. While trying to give all of the teams national exposure, ABC ended up with far too many games between sub .500 clubs from small markets. Reviewing the network's first two weeks of coverage for Sports Illustrated, William Leggett opined: "It may be unfair to say that Monday Night Baseball, as it has been presented by ABC so far this season, is the worst television treatment ever given a major sport, because by all odds somebody at sometime must have done something worse. But it is difficult to remember when or where that might have happened."

On the flip side however, ABC Sports head Roone Arledge brought in then innovative concept of a center field camera. This camera is behind the pitcher that looks at the batter's face. ABC Sports had to gain special permission from both Major League Baseball and the home team to put the camera in center field.

Just like with Monday Night Football, ABC brought in the concept of the three-man-booth (originally with Bob Prince, Bob Uecker, and Warner Wolf as the primary crew) to their baseball telecasts. Al Michaels, then the radio announcer for the San Francisco Giants, was brought in by ABC as the back-up announcer for Monday Night Baseball. That year, Michaels called two no-hitters: by the Pirates' John Candelaria vs. Los Angeles on August 9 (for ABC) and the Giants' John Montefusco at Atlanta on September 29, 1976 (for Giants radio). Michaels initially worked in the booth alongside Bob Gibson and Norm Cash. The following year, Cash would be replaced by Bill White, who himself, would remain with ABC through the 1979 season. All in all, the back-up telecasts were made available to an estimated 15% of the United States.

Roone Arledge stated that "It'll take something different for it to work – i.e. curb viewership yawns and lulls with Uecker as the real difference", so Arledge reportedly hoped. Prince disclosed to his broadcasting partner Jim Woods about his early worries about calling a network series for the first time. Prince for one, didn't have as much creative control over the broadcasts on ABC as he did calling Pittsburgh Pirates games on KDKA radio. On the June 7, 1976, edition of Monday Night Baseball, Prince returned to Three Rivers Stadium, from which he had been exiled for over a year. Although Prince received a warm reception, he was confused when the next day the Pittsburgh Post-Gazette read: "Ratings are low, negative reviews rampant." Critics ripped ABC's coverage for such things as its camera work (they often followed fly balls like they did golf shots, keeping the focus on the ball) and its choice of announcers: Bob Prince was accused of a National League bias, while Bob Uecker was considered to be just a Don Meredith clone.

On June 28, 1976, the Detroit Tigers faced the New York Yankees on Monday Night Baseball, with 47,855 attending at Tiger Stadium and a national television audience, Tigers pitcher Mark "The Bird" Fidrych talked to the ball and groomed the mound, as the Tigers won, 5–1 in a game that lasted only 1 hour and 51 minutes. After the game, the crowd would not leave the park until Fidrych came out of the dugout to tip his cap.

For ABC's coverage of the 1976 All-Star Game from Philadelphia, the team of Bob Prince, Bob Uecker and Warner Wolf alternated roles for the broadcast. For the first three innings, Prince did play-by-play with Wolf on color commentary and Uecker doing field interviews. For the middle innings, Uecker worked play-by-play with Prince on color and Wolf doing the interviews. For the rest of the game, Wolf worked play-by-play with Uecker on color and Prince doing interviews.

Bob Prince was gone by the fall of 1976, with Keith Jackson, Howard Cosell, and guest analyst Reggie Jackson calling that year's American League Championship Series. (Warner Wolf, Al Michaels and guest analyst Tom Seaver worked the NLCS.) On the subject of his dismissal from ABC, Bob Prince said "I hated Houston, and ABC never let me be Bob Prince." MLB commissioner Bowie Kuhn strongly objected to ABC's recruitment of Howard Cosell because of comments by Cosell in recent years about how dull baseball had become. But Roone Arledge held the trump card as the contract he had signed with Major League Baseball gave ABC the final say over announcers. So Cosell worked the 1976 ALCS and became a regular member of Monday Night Baseball the next season.

Keith Jackson was unavailable to call Game 1 of the 1976 ALCS because he had just gotten finished calling an Oklahoma-Texas college football game for ABC. Thus, Bob Uecker filled-in for Jackson for Game 1. Uecker also took part in the postgame interviews for Game 5 of the 1976 ALCS, while Warner Wolf did an interview of George Brett in the Kansas City locker room.

Still on the disabled list toward the end of the 1977 season, Mark Fidrych worked as a guest color analyst on a Monday Night Baseball telecast for ABC; he was subsequently criticized for his lack of preparation, as when play-by-play partner Al Michaels tried talking with him about Philadelphia Phillies player Richie Hebner and Fidrych responded, "Who's Richie Hebner?" As an American League player, Fidrych had never had to face Hebner, who played in the National League.

The 1977 World Series marked the first time that the participating teams' local announcers were not used as the booth announcers on the network telecast of a World Series. 1977 was also the first year in which one announcer (in this case, ABC's Keith Jackson) provided all of the play-by-play for a World Series telecast. In previous years, the play-by-play announcers and color commentators had alternated roles during each game. Meanwhile, New York Yankees announcer Bill White and Los Angeles Dodgers announcer Ross Porter alternated between pregame/postgame duties on ABC and calling the games for CBS Radio. White worked the ABC telecasts for the games in New York (including the clubhouse trophy presentation ceremony after Game 6) while Porter did likewise for the games in Los Angeles.

==== "The Bronx is Burning" ====
Howard Cosell was widely attributed with saying the famous phrase "The Bronx is burning". Cosell is credited with saying the quote during Game 2 of the 1977 World Series, which took place in Yankee Stadium on October 12, 1977. For a couple of years, fires had routinely erupted in the South Bronx, mostly due to low-value property owners setting their own properties ablaze for insurance money. During the bottom of the first inning, an ABC aerial camera panned a few blocks from Yankee Stadium to a building on fire, giving the world a real-life view of the infamous Bronx fires. The scene became a defining image of New York City in the 1970s. Cosell supposedly stated, "There it is, ladies and gentlemen, The Bronx is burning." This was later picked up by candidate Ronald Reagan, who then made a special trip to the Bronx, to illustrate the failures of then-contemporary politicians to address the issues in that part of New York City.

In 2005, author Jonathan Mahler published Ladies and Gentlemen, The Bronx is Burning, a book on New York in 1977, and credited Cosell with saying the title quote during the aerial coverage of the fire. ESPN produced a 2007 mini-series based on the book called The Bronx is Burning. Cosell's comment seemed to have captured the widespread view held at the time that New York City was on the skids and in a state of decline.

The truth was discovered after Major League Baseball published a complete DVD set of all of the games of the 1977 World Series. Coverage of the fire begins with Keith Jackson commenting on the enormity of the blaze, while Cosell added that President Carter had visited that area just days before. As the top of the second inning began, the fire was once again shown from a helicopter-mounted camera, and Cosell commented that the New York Fire Department had a hard job to do in the Bronx as there were always numerous fires. In the bottom of the second, Cosell informed the audience that it was an abandoned building that was burning and no lives were in danger. There was no further comment on the fire, and Cosell appears to have never said "The Bronx is Burning" (at least not on camera) during Game 2.

=== 1978–1979 ===
In 1978, Baseball Hall of Famer Don Drysdale joined ABC Sports with assignments such as Monday Night Baseball, Superstars, and Wide World of Sports. In 1979, Drysdale covered the World Series Trophy presentation. According to Drysdale "My thing is to talk about inside things. Keith [Jackson] does play-by-play. Howard's [Cosell] role is anything since anything can happen in broadcasting." When ABC released and then rehired him in 1981, Drysdale explained it by saying "If there is nothing to say, be quiet." Ultimately, Drysdale seemed to be slowly phased out of the ABC picture as fellow pitcher Jim Palmer was considered ABC's new poster child "[of] superior looks and...popularity from underwear commercials." By 1989, Palmer would earn $350,000 from ABC for appearing on around ten regular season broadcasts and making a few postseason appearances.

For a national television audience, the 1978 American League East tie-breaker game (New York Yankees/Boston Red Sox) aired on ABC with Keith Jackson and Don Drysdale on the call. Meanwhile, the game aired locally in New York City on WPIX and WSBK-TV in Boston with local announcers. Also in 1978, Keith Jackson called an Oklahoma-Texas college football game for ABC and then, flew to New York, arriving just in time to call Game 4 of the ALCS that same night (October 7).

In 1979, the start of ABC's Monday Night Baseball coverage was moved back to June, due to poor ratings during the May sweeps period. In place of April and May prime time games, ABC began airing Sunday Afternoon Baseball games in September. The network also aired one Friday night game (the Yankees at the Angels) on July 13 of that year. On August 6, 1979, the entire Yankee team attended team captain/catcher Thurman Munson's funeral in Canton, Ohio. Teammates Lou Piniella and Bobby Murcer, who were Munson's best friends, gave eulogies. That night (before a national viewing audience on ABC's Monday Night Baseball) the Yankees beat the Baltimore Orioles 5–4 in New York, with Murcer driving in all five runs with a three-run home run in the seventh inning and a two-run single in the bottom of the ninth.

For the 1979 World Series, ABC used play-by-play announcers Keith Jackson (in Baltimore) and Al Michaels (in Pittsburgh), and color commentators Howard Cosell and Don Drysdale. ABC's broadcast was also simulcast over the Orioles' and Pirates' respective local television outlets, CBS affiliates WMAR-TV in Baltimore and KDKA-TV in Pittsburgh, in addition to ABC's own affiliates WJZ-TV and WTAE-TV. After the sixth game, Howard Cosell in his limo was surrounded and attacked by angry Oriole fans with shaving cream, which prompted Baltimore police to complement his private security for Game 7.

== 1980s ==
ABC hardly showed many baseball games during the regular season in the 1980s. And when they did, it was only on either Monday or Thursday nights from the end of Sweeps Week in late May until when the NFL Preseason started in the first week of August. After that, they typically would not broadcast baseball again until the playoffs. ABC also had a clause where they could air a game the last day of the regular season if it had playoff implications, such as in 1987 in regards to the Detroit Tigers' American League East pennant chase against the Toronto Blue Jays. The team of Al Michaels, Jim Palmer, and Tim McCarver called that game nationally. However, in 1986, ABC did do a number of early season Sunday afternoon games before they went into Monday Night Baseball.

=== 1980–1982 ===
ABC's contract was further modified prior to the 1980 season, with the network airing just five Monday Night Baseball telecasts in June of that year, followed by Sunday Afternoon Baseball in August and September. ABC did Sunday afternoon games late in the season to fulfill the number of games in the contract and to not interfere with Monday Night Football. Also in 1980, ABC (with Al Michaels and Bob Uecker on the call) broadcast the National League West tie-breaker game between the Houston Astros and Los Angeles Dodgers. On October 11, 1980, Keith Jackson called an Oklahoma-Texas college football game for ABC in the afternoon, then flew to Houston to call Game 4 of the NLCS). In the meantime, Don Drysdale did the play-by-play for the early innings (up until the middle of the fourth inning). Meanwhile, ABC used Steve Zabriskie as a field reporter during the 1980 NLCS.

In 1981, ABC planned to increase coverage to 10 Monday night games and eight Sunday afternoon games, but the players' strike that year ended up reducing the network's schedule to three Monday night and seven Sunday afternoon telecasts. Also in 1981, as means to recoup revenue lost during a players' strike, Major League Baseball set up a special additional playoff round (as a prelude to the League Championship Series). ABC televised the American League Division Series while NBC televised the National League Division Series. The Division Series round wasn't officially instituted until 14 years later. Games 3 of the Brewers/Yankees series and Royals/Athletics series were aired regionally. On October 10, Keith Jackson called an Oklahoma-Texas college football game for ABC and missed Game 4 of the Milwaukee-New York series. In Jackson's absence, Don Drysdale filled-in for him on play-by-play alongside Howard Cosell. On a trivial note the ABC's affiliates, WTEN in Albany, New York and its satellite WCDC-TV in Adams, Massachusetts, as well as WIXT (now WSYR-TV) in Syracuse, New York, did not carry any of ABC's games at that time because of the New York Yankees games that were simulcast from New York City's WPIX, movies, and syndicated series and specials among others to provide advertising for those extra money.

In 1982, ABC aired 11 Monday night games and one Sunday afternoon game. Following his retirement, Steve Stone was hired by ABC to serve as a color commentator for their Monday Night Baseball telecasts. Stone was normally paired with Al Michaels and Bob Uecker in the booth.

Also in 1982, Baltimore Orioles manager Earl Weaver announced he would retire at the end of the season, one which saw the Orioles wallow at the back of the pack for the first half of the year before climbing in the standings to just three games behind going into a season-ending four-game series against the division-leading Milwaukee Brewers at Baltimore's Memorial Stadium. The Orioles beat them handily in the first three games to pull into a first-place tie. The final game of the series, and the season, on October 3, would decide the AL East title. Televised nationally on a Sunday afternoon on ABC (with Keith Jackson and Howard Cosell on the call), the Orioles suffered a crushing 10–2 loss. After the game, the crowd called for Weaver to come out. This tribute to the retiring Weaver provided intense emotion against the backdrop of the season-ending defeat, as Weaver, in tears, stood on the field and applauded back to the fans, and shared words and an embrace with Brewers manager Harvey Kuenn.

Game 1 of the 1982 NLCS had to be played twice. In the first attempt (on October 6), the Atlanta Braves led against the St. Louis Cardinals 1–0 behind Phil Niekro. The game was three outs away becoming official when the umpire stopped it. When the rain did not subside, the game was canceled. Game 1 began from the start the following night in a pitching match-up of Pascual Pérez for the Braves and longtime Cardinal starter Bob Forsch. Howard Cosell did not broadcast Game 2 of the 1982 NLCS (alongside Al Michaels and Tommy Lasorda) because of his commitment of hosting the Pittsburgh Steelers' 50th Anniversary dinner in Pittsburgh on October 9, 1982, which was broadcast live on Pittsburgh's ABC affiliate, WTAE-TV and Pittsburgh's NBC affiliate, WPXI-TV. ABC's Jim Lampley interviewed the winners in the Cardinals' clubhouse after clinching the National League pennant in Game 3.

The ABC's coverage of 1982 American League Championship Series between the Milwaukee Brewers and California Angels, featured the broadcast team of Keith Jackson, Jim Palmer, and Earl Weaver. In his final assignment as a member of ABC's baseball broadcasting team, Bob Uecker interviewed the victorious members of the Brewers from their clubhouse following Game 5. Meanwhile, Ted Dawson interviewed 1982 ALCS Most Valuable Player Fred Lynn (the first player from the losing side to be awarded the MVP Award for a League Championship Series), Bobby Grich, and manager Gene Mauch from the Angels' clubhouse after Game 5. Following the 1982 ALCS, Keith Jackson wouldn't be assigned to broadcast further Major League Baseball games for ABC until the 1986 season.

=== 1983–1989 television package ===
On April 7, 1983, Major League Baseball, ABC, and NBC agreed to terms of a six-year television package worth $1.2 billion. The two networks continued to alternate coverage of the playoffs (ABC in even numbered years and NBC in odd numbered years), World Series (ABC televised the World Series in odd numbered years and NBC in even numbered years), and All-Star Game (ABC televised the All-Star Game in even numbered years and NBC in odd numbered years) through the 1989 season, with each of the 26 clubs receiving $7 million per year in return. The last package gave each club $1.9 million per year. ABC contributed $575 million for regular season prime time and Sunday afternoons and NBC paid $550 million for thirty Saturday afternoon games. ABC was contracted to televise 20 prime time regular season games a year in addition to other games (the aforementioned Sunday afternoon games). But ABC didn't come close to using that many, which meant they actually paid for games they weren't showing. To give you some perspective, ABC televised six prime time games in 1984 and eight 1985. They planned to again televise eight prime time games in 1986.

USA Network's coverage became a casualty of the new $1.2 billion TV contract between Major League Baseball, ABC and NBC. One of the provisions to the new deal was that local telecasts opposite network games had to be eliminated.

1983 marked the last time that local telecasts of League Championship Series games were allowed. In 1982, Major League Baseball recognized a problem with this due to the emergence of cable superstations such as WTBS in Atlanta and WGN-TV in Chicago. When TBS tried to petition for the right to do a "local" Braves broadcast of the 1982 NLCS, Major League Baseball got a Philadelphia federal court to ban them on the grounds that as a cable superstation, TBS couldn't have a nationwide telecast competing with ABC's.

On June 6, 1983, Al Michaels officially succeeded Keith Jackson as the lead play-by-play announcer for Monday Night Baseball. Michaels, who spent seven seasons working backup games, was apparently very miffed over ABC Sports' delay in announcing him as their top baseball announcer. Unlike Jackson, whose forte was college football, Michaels had gigs with the Cincinnati Reds and San Francisco Giants before joining ABC in 1976. TV Guide huffed about Jackson by saying "A football guy, on baseball!" Jackson was unavailable for several World Series games in 1979 and 1981 because of conflicts with his otherwise normal college football broadcasting schedule. Thus, Michaels did play-by-play for games on weekends.

Earl Weaver was the lead ABC color commentator in 1983, but was also employed by the Baltimore Orioles as a consultant. At the time, ABC had a policy preventing an announcer who was employed by a team from working games involving that team. So whenever the Orioles were on the primary ABC game, Weaver worked the backup game. This policy forced Weaver to resign from the Orioles' consulting position in October so that he could work the World Series for ABC.

The 1984 NLCS schedule (which had an off day after Game 3 rather than Game 2) allowed ABC to have a prime time game each weeknight even though Chicago's Wrigley Field did not have lights at the time (which remained the case until four years later). ABC used Tim McCarver as a field reporter during the 1984 NLCS. During the regular season, McCarver teamed with Don Drysdale (who teamed with Earl Weaver and Reggie Jackson for the 1984 NLCS) on backup games while Al Michaels, Jim Palmer, and Earl Weaver/Howard Cosell formed ABC's lead broadcast team. For ABC's coverage of the 1984 All-Star Game, Jim Palmer only served as a between innings analyst.

Had the 1984 ALCS between the Detroit Tigers and Kansas City Royals gone the full five games (the last year that the League Championship Series was a best-of-five series), Game 5 on Sunday October 7, would have been a 1 p.m. ET time start instead of being in prime time. This would have happened because one of the presidential debates between Ronald Reagan and Walter Mondale was scheduled for that night. In return, ABC was going to broadcast the debates instead of a baseball game in prime time. Al Trautwig interviewed the Detroit Tigers from their clubhouse following their pennant clinching victory in Game 3.

Between his stints with the California Angels and Oakland Athletics in 1985, Tommy John served as color commentator alongside Tim McCarver for a game between the Chicago White Sox and the Athletics in Oakland on Monday Night Baseball on June 24. McCarver's normal broadcast partner in 1985, Don Drysdale, in addition to his ABC duties, was an announcer for the White Sox at the time, cannot partake in the June 24 broadcast out of fear of it appearing as a "conflict of interest". This situation was similar to the one with Earl Weaver being prohibited from taking part in ABC's broadcasts of Baltimore Orioles games in 1983.

In 1985, ABC announced that every game of the World Series would be played under the lights for the biggest baseball audience possible. Just prior to the start of the 1985 World Series, ABC removed Howard Cosell from scheduled announcing duties as punishment for his controversial book I Never Played the Game that criticized his colleagues at ABC. In Cosell's place came Tim McCarver (joining play-by-play man Michaels and fellow color commentator Jim Palmer), who was beginning his trek of being a part of numerous World Series telecasts. Reportedly, by 1985, Cosell was considered to be difficult to work with on baseball telecasts. Apparently, Cosell and Michaels got into a fairly heated argument following the conclusion of their coverage of the 1984 American League Championship Series due to Cosell's supposed drunkenness among other problems. Rumor has it that Michaels went as far as to urged ABC executives to remove Cosell from the booth. Ultimately, Michaels went public with his problems with Cosell. Michaels claimed that "Howard had become a cruel, evil, vicious person."

In the end, the very last baseball game that Howard Cosell would help broadcast for ABC and his very last assignment for ABC Sports in general, was a game between the Kansas City Royals and Minnesota Twins in Minneapolis on Sunday, September 29, 1985.

Perhaps Al Michaels's first historic call with ABC Sports while covering Major League Baseball occurred in what is now known by many as the Don Denkinger game on October 26, 1985. The Kansas City Royals trailed the St. Louis Cardinals 3–1 in a World Series that was panned for being low-scoring and dull. After a Royals win in St. Louis forced the action back to Kansas City, the sixth game was also low scoring. However, this contest grew into a tense pitcher's duel.

In the bottom of the 9th, pinch-hitter Jorge Orta led off for the Royals against Cardinals pitcher Todd Worrell with Kansas City trailing 1–0 and hit a ground ball to first baseman Jack Clark. Clark threw over to pitcher Worrell, who was running over to cover first base in time to beat the speedy Orta and did. Yet first base umpire Don Denkinger still called Orta safe at first. Steve Balboni then hit a pop-up to first which Jack Clark missed for an error, keeping Balboni's at-bat alive, and he promptly singled to put men on first and second.

The infamous and controversial leadoff single by Orta and the Jack Clark error eventually led to the Royals loading the bases and putting the tying run on third base and the winning run on second with one out for Dane Iorg. Iorg hit a 2-run single and the Royals came back to win 2–1. The Royals went on to win Game 7 11–0 and complete the comeback after being down 2–0 and 3–1. However, it was Denkinger's dubious 'safe' call, and not Iorg's hit, Clark's error, Jim Sundberg's heroics (for his difficult slide past catcher Darrell Porter for the winning run) or the Game 7 blowout that were most remembered in years to come.

Little squibber to the right side, Worrell racing to cover and the throw doesn't get him!

— Al Michaels describing Don Denkinger's infamous call in Game 6 of the 1985 World Series.

==== 1986–1988 ====
By 1986, ABC only televised 13 Monday Night Baseball games. This was a fairly sharp contrast to the 18 games to that were scheduled in 1978. The Sporting News believed that ABC paid Major League Baseball to not make them televise the regular season. No late season games in September were scheduled in 1986. TSN added that the network only wanted the sport for October anyway. Going into 1987, ABC had reportedly purchased 20 Monday night games but only used eight of those slots. More to the point, CBS Sports president Neal Pilson said "Three years ago, we believed ABC's package was overpriced by $175 million. We still believe it's overpriced by $175 million."

During the 1986 season, Don Drysdale did play-by-play ABC's Sunday afternoon games, which aired until July, when Monday Night Baseball began. ABC's Monday night schedule in 1986, then started on July 7 and ran through August 25. Al Michaels did both the main Sunday and Monday game usually with Jim Palmer, while Drysdale and Johnny Bench did the backup contests. Keith Jackson, did the secondary Monday night games with Tim McCarver. Bench took a week off in June (with Steve Busby filling in) and also worked one game with Michaels as the networks switched the announcer pairings. While Drysdale worked the All-Star Game in Houston as an interviewer, he did not resurface until the playoffs. Bench simply disappeared, ultimately going to CBS Radio.

On October 12, 1986, at Anaheim Stadium, Al Michaels along with Jim Palmer called Game 5 of the American League Championship Series. The California Angels held a 3–1 lead of a best-of-seven against the Boston Red Sox. In the game, the Angels held a 5–2 lead going into the ninth inning. Boston scored two runs on a home run by Don Baylor, closing the gap to 5–4.

When Donnie Moore came in to shut down the rally, there were two outs, and a runner on first base, Rich Gedman, who had been hit by a pitch. The Angels were one out from their first-ever trip to the World Series. But Dave Henderson hit a 2–2 pitch off Moore for a home run, giving the Red Sox a 6–5 lead. The Angels were able to score a run in the bottom of the ninth, pushing the game into extra innings. Moore continued to pitch for the Angels. He was able to stifle a 10th inning Red Sox rally by getting Jim Rice to ground into a double play. Nevertheless, the Red Sox were able to score off Moore in the 11th-inning via a sacrifice fly by Henderson. The Angels did not score in the bottom of the 11th and lost the game 7–6.

The defeat still left the Angels in a 3–2 advantage, with two more games to play at Fenway Park. The Angels were not able to recover, losing both games by wide margins, 10–4 and 8–1. Game 7 of the 1986 ALCS ended with Calvin Schiraldi striking out Jerry Narron.

The Red Sox can go from last rites to the World Series…and they do!

— Al Michaels' call of Calvin Schiraldi's final strikeout in Game 7 of the 1986 ALCS.

On October 15, 1986, Game 6 of the NLCS ran so long (lasting for 16 innings, 5 hours and 29 minutes), it bumped up against the start time of Game 7 of the ALCS (also on ABC). That same game, color commentator Tim McCarver left the booth during the bottom of the 16th, to cover the expected celebration in the New York Mets' clubhouse. As a result, play-by-play man Keith Jackson was on the air alone for a short time. Eventually, McCarver rejoined the broadcast just before the end of the game, watching the action on a monitor in the Mets' clubhouse, then doing the postgame interviews with the Mets. Meanwhile, Corey McPherrin, a sports anchor with WABC (ABC's flagship station out of New York City) interviewed Mike Scott when he was presented with the 1986 NLCS MVP award after Game 6. During the late 1980s, McPherrin delivered in-game updates during ABC's Monday Night Baseball and Thursday Night Baseball broadcasts.

Game 6 of the 1986 NLCS turned out to be the final Major League Baseball game that Keith Jackson would broadcast. Meanwhile, in his last ever ABC assignment, Don Drysdale interviewed the winners in the Boston clubhouse following Game 7 of the 1986 ALCS.

For the 1987 World Series between the Minnesota Twins and St. Louis Cardinals, ABC used 12 cameras and nine tape machines. This includes cameras positioned down the left field line, on the roof of the Metrodome, and high above third base. There have been a few occasions when two Monday Night Football games were played simultaneously. In 1987, a scheduling conflict arose when Major League Baseball's Minnesota Twins went to Game 7 of the World Series, making the Hubert H. Humphrey Metrodome unavailable for the Minnesota Vikings' scheduled game (against the Denver Broncos) that Sunday. Game 6 of the 1987 World Series (played on Saturday, October 24) was the last World Series game to not be played in prime time. The game started at 4 p.m. Eastern Time. Another weekend afternoon sixth game was planned for 1988, however, since the World Series ended in five games, it was unnecessary.

The 1987 World Series was the final one that ABC aired that went the full seven games. The next time that ABC broadcast a World Series in 1989, the Oakland Athletics swept the San Francisco Giants in four games. For the final World Series that ABC broadcast to date, 1995, they split the coverage with NBC. ABC only covered Games 1, 4–5 and a seventh game had it been necessary. ABC overall, drew a 24.0 rating for their coverage of the 1987 World Series.

In a February 2015 interview, Al Michaels alleged the Twins pumped artificial crowd noise into the Metrodome during the 1987 World Series. Responding to Michaels' theory, Twins President Dave St. Peter said that he did not think the Twins needed "conspiracy theories" in order to win the World Series. Instead, he argued that "appreciation and respect" should be paid to players like Frank Viola, Gary Gaetti, Kent Hrbek, and Kirby Puckett, who, he said, "came out of nowhere to win a championship."

To Gaetti…for the first time ever, the Minnesota Twins are the World Champions!

— Al Michaels calling the final out of Game 7 of the 1987 World Series on ABC.

During the 1988 Writers Guild of America strike, networks benefited from sports programming, including NBC, which relied on the Summer Olympics in September and the World Series in October, and ABC, which in addition to its postseason baseball coverage, moved up the start time for the early weeks of Monday Night Football (when Al Michaels was unavailable to do play-by-play on Monday Night Football, which he had done for ABC beginning in 1986 due to his postseason baseball duties, Frank Gifford covered for him) from 9 p.m. ET to 8 p.m. ET (MacGyver, which normally aired at 8 pm, was not yet ready with new episodes).

Come the 1988 League Championship Series, ABC under the guidance of new executive producer Geoffrey Mason, debuted fatter and wider graphics that gave off a cleaner, sharper look complete with a black border. ABC also debuted a new energetic, symphonic-pop styled musical theme, composed by Kurt Bestor, which would become an all-compassing theme of sorts for ABC Sports during this time period. ABC also begun employing the services of Pinnacle Productions Inc., a video-production company based out of Spokane, Washington, to create the opening title sequences for their sports telecasts.

ABC's coverage of Game 2 of the 1988 NLCS didn't start until 10 p.m. ET due to a presidential debate. This is the latest ever scheduled start for an LCS game.

Gary Bender did play-by-play for the 1988 American League Championship Series between the Oakland Athletics and Boston Red Sox. Bender spent two years (1987–1988) as the No. 2 baseball play-by-play man for ABC behind Al Michaels. Bender worked the backup Monday Night Baseball broadcasts (with Tim McCarver in 1987 and Joe Morgan in 1988) as well as serving as a field reporter for ABC's 1987 World Series coverage. After Bender spent an entire summer developing a team with Joe Morgan, ABC brought in Reggie Jackson to work with the duo for the 1988 ALCS. According to Bender's autobiography Call of the Game (pages 118–120), ABC's decision to bring in Jackson to work with Bender and Morgan caused problems:

Reggie is one of the strongest personalities I've ever met. He epitomizes the big-name athlete who has become a great player, in part because of his ego, but who does not have the sensitivity to let go of that ego when working with others. Consequently, Reggie demanded things he hadn't earned the right to demand. He wanted more attention. He insisted we adjust our way of doing things for him.

During the spare time of his active career, Reggie Jackson worked as a field reporter and color commentator for ABC Sports. During the 1980s (1983, 1985, and 1987 respectively), Jackson was given the task of presiding over the World Series Trophy presentations.

After wrapping up his play-by-play duties for ABC's coverage of the 1988 ALCS, in which Oakland swept Boston in four games, Gary Bender covered the postgame interviews in the victorious Los Angeles Dodgers' clubhouse following Game 7 of the 1988 NLCS against the New York Mets. Three days earlier, Mike Barry interviewed Boston manager Joe Morgan following their defeat to Oakland in Game 4 of the ALCS.

==== 1989 ====
On December 14, 1988, CBS (under the guidance of Commissioner Peter Ueberroth, Major League Baseball's broadcast director Bryan Burns, CBS Inc. CEO Laurence Tisch as well as CBS Sports executives Neal Pilson and Eddie Einhorn) paid approximately US$1.8 billion (equivalent to 2.71 billion in 2025) for exclusive over-the-air television rights for over four years (beginning in 1990). CBS paid about $265 million each year for the World Series, League Championship Series, All-Star Game, and the Saturday Game of the Week. It was one of the largest agreements (to date) between the sport of baseball and the business of broadcasting. The cost of the deal between CBS and Major League Baseball was about 25% more than in the previous television contract with ABC and NBC.

According to industry insiders, neither NBC nor ABC wanted the entire baseball package—that is, regular-season games, both League Championship Series and the World Series—because such a commitment would have required them to preempt too many highly rated prime time shows. Thus, ABC and NBC bid thinking that two of the networks might share postseason play again or that one of the championship series might wind up on cable. Peter Ueberroth had encouraged the cable idea, but after the bids were opened, NBC and ABC found to their chagrin that he preferred network exposure for all postseason games. Only CBS, with its weak prime time programming, dared go for that.

In 1989 (the final year of ABC's contract with Major League Baseball), ABC moved the baseball telecasts to Thursday nights in hopes of getting leg up against NBC's Cosby Show. Scott Muni, a disc jockey, who worked at the heyday of the AM Top 40 format and then was a pioneer of FM progressive rock radio, voiced promos for ABC's Thursday Night Baseball broadcasts. ABC was also still in-line to air a special Sunday afternoon telecast on October 1 in the event that the American League East race between the Toronto Blue Jays and Baltimore Orioles still hadn't been decided. But since the Blue Jays managed to clinch the divisional title the day prior, it wasn't necessary.

After braving the traumatic Loma Prieta earthquake and an all-time low 16.4 rating for the 1989 World Series, Al Michaels took ABC's loss of baseball to CBS as "tough to accept." Michaels added that "baseball was such an early stepchild at ABC and had come such a long way." Gary Thorne, who served as ABC's backup play-by-play announcer in 1989 and was an on-field reporter for the World Series that year (and covered the trophy presentation in the process), simply laughed while saying "Great reviews, just as ABC baseball ends." Meanwhile, Dennis Swanson, president of ABC Sports, noted in a statement that baseball had been a blue-chip franchise since 1976 for the network, which was disappointed to lose it. After ABC lost the Major League Baseball package to CBS, they aggressively counterprogrammed CBS' postseason baseball coverage (like NBC) with made-for-TV movies and miniseries geared towards female viewers.

I'll miss it. I've been involved with this (ABC) package since Day One (in 1976). Especially now, because beginning with our postseason coverage in 1985 [That's when analysts Jim Palmer and Tim McCarver permanently joined ABC's baseball crew, teaming with producer Curt Gowdy Jr. and director Craig Janoff], I really felt we'd put it together the way I'd always dreamed about it. In the early years, we attempted to cover it in a different fashion. ABC had been gigantically successful with 'Wide World of Sports' and with covering the Olympic Games. A number of people in our company wanted to cover baseball (like) gymnastics and swimming and other 'Wide World' events. Attempting to do that was basically, in the early years, an abysmal failure. Baseball needs to be looked at in a certain manner. You need people in it who understand the game and truly love the game. It took us a while to get the right people and the right group together. I know some of the NBC people recently have talked about their cameramen, their audio men, the guys involved with their telecasts are baseball fans. They love baseball. It took us a while to get up to speed in that area. But once we did, we began to cover it as well as it's been covered. I'm tremendously proud of what we have done, especially from the 1985 postseason coverage on. We got to a point, especially in the last couple of years, (where) nothing can stop us now. And the only thing that stopped us was the fact we lost the rights.

— Al Michaels to the Chicago Tribune on October 17, 1989.

According to ABC broadcast engineer Dan Rapak in the book Brought to You by . . ., ABC's coverage of the 1989 World Series was about to become a case study in financial stupidity. By this point in time, ABC Sports was well into cost-cutting mode and trying to avoid unnecessarily expenditure. ABC decided that to save money, there would be no satellite uplink trunk present at San Francisco's Candlestick Park. Instead, the feed from San Francisco back to ABC's headquarters in New York City would take a complex, circuitous route. For starters, the signal would go from the truck to a telephone company room (dubbed a "clamper room") at the third level of the stadium. From there, the signal would be transmitted over a fiber optic cable onto the local phone company switching office. From there, the signal would be sent to KGO, ABC's owned-and-operated station in the San Francisco Bay Area. The signal would then pass through KGO's Master Control Room and soon uplinked to a satellite which relayed the signal to a downlink in Connecticut. Finally, the signal would be sent to the ABC Television Complex in New York.

Rapak added that to save further costs, ABC decided that an on-site telephone company technician wasn't really necessary. As such, ABC wouldn't pay to have him on site just in case any problems might have arise with the phone company's equipment. Not only that, but ABC merely rented a small standby generator to protect them in the event of a power failure. ABC's management decided that it would be too costly to have a large "transfer switch" shipped in from ABC Sports' field shop in Lodi, New Jersey. This particular switch would be able to shift the entire load of all the mobile units from local utility power to the generator with a single pull of a large lever. But since ABC's engineers who were working at Candlestick Park during the 1989 World Series had no means of quickly putting the generator into service should the need arise, they would have to instead, kill the utility power sources for safety. They would then have to disconnect more than a dozen huge power cables from the power boxes inside of the stadium. Next, they would have to physically drag the power cables outside of the stadium and reconnect all of them to turn the generator on. This in effect, meant that the changeover would've taken approximately 10 minutes, when it could've simply taken less than a minute.

If you'll indulge us just another moment, this is the end of our association with baseball. I think as many of you may know, the primary package goes to CBS. And to our friends at what's known in the industry as "Black Rock", good luck in 1990 and beyond. To those of you at NBC, for 41 years you made this an art form! And to people especially like Curt Gowdy Sr., the fabulous announcer...to the Hall of Fame director Harry Coyle...and down through the years...to Tony Kubek and the people of the present like Bob Costas and all the men and women at NBC, at the peacock...take a bow, you were terrific! And we're done...for a while anyway after 14 years at ABC. We want to thank you for watching and we want to thank all the people that have come together to work on our telecasts. We have our own Curt Gowdy, Curt Gowdy Jr., who has been our terrific producer. And Craig Janoff and to the incomparable Steve Hirdt, it's been a great ride for 14 years. We're going to show you all the names right now, gentlemen...roll the credits as we say goodnight...from San Francisco!

— Al Michaels at the end of ABC's coverage of the 1989 World Series.

Prior to the start of the 1990 season, speculation arose that Al Michaels would move over to CBS in the event that he won an arbitration case against ABC. Tim McCarver had already been hired by CBS to serve as their lead color commentator and they were in need of a play-by-play man following the abrupt dismissal of Brent Musburger on April Fools' Day 1990. Michaels had been feuding with ABC over an alleged violation of company policy. Michaels' contract with ABC was originally set to expire in late 1992. Ultimately however, ABC announced a contract extension that sources said would keep Michaels at ABC through at least the end of 1995 and would pay him at least $2.2 million annually with the potential to earn more. That would make Michaels the highest-paid sports announcer in television. Meanwhile, CBS eventually settled on using the services of Jack Buck for their top play-by-play man.

===== Loma Prieta earthquake =====
Game 3 of the 1989 World Series (initially scheduled for October 17) was delayed by ten days due to the Loma Prieta earthquake. The earthquake struck at approximately 5:04 p.m. Pacific Time. At the moment the quake struck, ABC's color commentator Tim McCarver was narrating taped highlights of the previous Series game. Viewers saw the video signal begin to break up, heard McCarver repeat a sentence as the shaking distracted him, and heard McCarver's colleague Al Michaels exclaim, "I'll tell you what, we're having an earth—." At that moment, the feed from Candlestick Park was lost. The network put up a green ABC Sports telop graphic as the audio was switched to a telephone link. Michaels had to pick up a POTS phone in the press booth (phones work off a separate power supply) and call ABC headquarters in New York, at which point they put him back on the air. Michaels cracked, "Well folks, that's the greatest open in the history of television, bar none!" accompanied by the excited screams of fans who had no idea of the devastation elsewhere.

After about a 15-minute delay (ABC aired a rerun of Roseanne and subsequently, The Wonder Years in the meantime), ABC was able to regain power via a backup generator. ABC's play-by-play man, Al Michaels (who was familiar with the San Francisco Bay Area dating back to his days working for the San Francisco Giants from 1974–1976) then proceeded to relay reports to Ted Koppel at ABC News' headquarters in Washington, D.C. Al Michaels was ultimately nominated for an Emmy for his on-site reporting at the World Series.

The Goodyear Blimp was aloft above the ballpark to provide aerial coverage of the World Series. Blimp pilot John Crayton reported that he felt four bumps during the quake. ABC was able to use the blimp to capture some of the first images of the damage to the Bay Bridge.

At this very moment ten days ago, we began our telecast with an aerial view of San Francisco; always a spectacular sight, and particularly so on that day because the cloudless sky of October 17 was ice blue, and the late-day sun sparkled like a thousand jewels.

That picture was very much a mirror of the feel and the mood that had enveloped the Bay Area...and most of Northern California. Their baseball teams, the Giants and A's, had won pennants, and the people of this region were still basking in the afterglow of each team's success. And this great American sporting classic, the World Series, was, for the time being, exclusively theirs.

Then of course the feeling of pure radiance was transformed into horror and grief and despair- in just fifteen seconds. And now on October 27, like a fighter who's taken a vicious blow to the stomach and has groggily arisen, this region moves on and moves ahead.

And one part of that scenario is the resumption of the World Series. No one in this ballpark tonight- no player, no vendor, no fan, no writer, no announcer, in fact, no one in this area period- can forget the images. The column of smoke in the Marina. The severed bridge. The grotesque tangle of concrete in Oakland. The pictures are embedded in our minds.

And while the mourning and the suffering and the aftereffects will continue, in about thirty minutes the plate umpire, Vic Voltaggio will say 'Play Ball', and the players will play, the vendors will sell, the announcers will announce, the crowd will exhort. And for many of the six million people in this region, it will be like revisiting Fantasyland.

But Fantasyland is where baseball comes from anyway and maybe right about now that's the perfect place for a three-hour rest.

— Al Michaels at the beginning of ABC's telecast of the resumption of Game 3 of the 1989 World Series.

== 1990s ==
After a four-year-long hiatus (when CBS exclusively carried the over-the-air Major League Baseball television rights, as previously mentioned), ABC returned to baseball in (again, alongside NBC) 1994.

Under a six-year plan, Major League Baseball was intended to receive 85% of the first $140 million in advertising in advertising revenue (or 87.5% of advertising revenues and corporate sponsorship from the games until sales top a specified level), 50% of the next $30 million, and 80% of any additional money. Prior to this, Major League Baseball was projected to take a projected 55% cut in rights fees and receive a typical rights fee from the networks.

After NBC's coverage of 1994 All-Star Game was completed, ABC would air regular season games on Saturdays or Mondays for the next six-weeks. Joining the lead broadcast team of Al Michaels, Jim Palmer, and Tim McCarver was Lesley Visser, who served as the lead field reporter for the CBS' baseball coverage from 1990 to 1993. Visser was reuniting with McCarver, for whom she had worked with on CBS. The regular season games fell under the Baseball Night in America umbrella which premiered on July 16, 1994. On the subject of play-by-play man Al Michaels returning to baseball for the first time since the 1989 World Series, Jim Palmer said "Here Al is, having done five games since 1989 and steps right in. It's hard to comprehend how one guy could so amaze." Meanwhile, Brent Musburger, CBS alumnus Jim Kaat, and reporter Jack Arute became the secondary team for ABC. Musburger and Kaat called the rest of the 1995 American League Division Series between the Seattle Mariners and New York Yankees and the first two games of that year's American League Championship Series between Seattle and the Cleveland Indians.

No balls and a strike to Martínez. Line drive, we are tied! Griffey is coming around! In the corner is Bernie. He's going to try to score! Here's the division championship! Mariners win it! Mariners win it!

— Brent Musburger calling Edgar Martínez's game winning double in Game 5 of the 1995 ALDS between the Seattle Mariners and the New York Yankees.

In even-numbered years, NBC had the rights to the All-Star Game and both League Championship Series while ABC had the World Series and newly created Division Series. In odd-numbered years, both League Championship Series and All-Star Game television rights were supposed to alternate. As such, ABC would ultimately broadcast the 1995 All-Star Game from The Ballpark in Arlington in Arlington, Texas. It was ABC's first broadcast of the All-Star Game since the 1988 contest in Cincinnati. On Sunday, July 2, ABC aired a one-hour special hosted by Al Michaels that announced the names of the players who were selected to play in the 1995 All-Star Game.

ABC won the rights to the first dibs at the World Series in August 1993 after ABC Sports president Dennis Swanson won a coin toss by calling "heads." Ken Schanzer, who was the CEO of The Baseball Network, handled the coin toss. Schanzer agreed to the coin toss by ABC and NBC at the outset as the means of determining the order in which they'd divvy up the playoffs.

While ABC and NBC would provide some production personnel and their own announcers for the games, all of would be coordinated from the office of Ken Schanzer, the chief executive officer of The Baseball Network and former executive vice president for NBC Sports. The graphics, camera placements, and audio quality were intended on looking and sounding about the same on both networks.

Hi everyone, and welcome to Baseball Night in America, I'm Al Michaels. And those of us at ABC are delighted to be back in the business of broadcasting baseball for the first time since the 1989 World Series. And it's a brand new concept, we'll have six regular season games on ABC, including tonight and again on Monday night. Then, we'll bring you the Division playoffs in October, part of baseball's new expanded playoff format, and the World Series in late October. Baseball Night in America, a regionalized concept, you'll see a game in your region that's important to those of you in those particular areas. It also gives us the capability of updating games as never before. So sit back, relax and enjoy the premiere of Baseball Night in America as we take you out to the ballgames.

— Al Michaels on site at Seattle's Kingdome on the premiere broadcast of Baseball Night in America on July 16, 1994.

The long-term plans for The Baseball Network crumbled when the players went on strike on August 12, 1994 (thus forcing the cancellation of the World Series). In July 1995, ABC and NBC, who wound up having to share the duties of televising the 1995 World Series as a way to recoup (with ABC broadcasting Games 1, 4, and 5 and NBC broadcasting Games 2, 3, and 6), announced that they were opting out of their agreement with Major League Baseball. Both networks figured that as the delayed 1995 baseball season opened without a labor agreement, there was no guarantee against another strike. Both networks soon publicly vowed to cut all ties with Major League Baseball for the rest of the 20th century.

Al Michaels would later write in his 2014 autobiography You Can't Make This Up: Miracles, Memories, and the Perfect Marriage of Sports and Television that the competition between the two networks could be so juvenile that neither ABC nor NBC wanted to promote each other's telecasts during the 1995 World Series. In the middle of Game 1, Michaels was handed a promo that read "Join us here on ABC for Game 4 in Cleveland on Wednesday night and for Game 5 if necessary, Thursday." Michaels however would soon add "By the way, if you're wondering about Games 2 and 3, I can't tell you exactly where you can see them, but here's a hint: Last night, Bob Costas, Joe Morgan, and Bob Uecker ([NBC's broadcast crew] were spotted in Underground Atlanta." Naturally, Bob Costas soon made a similar reference to ABC's crew (Michaels, Jim Palmer, and Tim McCarver) on NBC.

ABC Sports president Dennis Swanson, in announcing the dissolution of The Baseball Network, said:

The fact of the matter is, Major League Baseball seems incapable at this point in time, of living with any longterm relationships, whether it's with fans, with players, with the political community in Washington, with the advertising community here in Manhattan, or with its TV partners.

Calling the final out of Game 5 of the 1995 World Series, Al Michaels said, "Back to Georgia!" as the Cleveland Indians took it; NBC carried the series-clinching sixth game two days later. As previously mentioned, had that particular World Series gone to a seventh game, then it would've been broadcast by ABC.

Okay Lesley! So the sixth game on NBC on Saturday. We would have a seventh game here on ABC if it goes to seven in Atlanta. To the strains of "Glory Days"...Springsteen's "Glory Days", it's a glory night in Cleveland. Their Indians win it by a score of 5 to 4. Braves lead the series 3 games to 2. Tonight's game brought to you by Lexus Luxury Automobiles, the result of a relentless pursuit of perfection, Texaco CleanSystem 3 Gasolines, and Budweiser, the gold medal winning American premium lager of the 1995 Great American Beer Festival, this Bud's for you. Al Michaels, Jim Palmer, Tim McCarver, Lesley Visser, John Saunders...saying goodnight...from Jacobs Field...in Cleveland!

— Al Michaels at the end of ABC's coverage of Game 5 of the 1995 World Series, the final Major League Baseball game that would be broadcast on ABC for 25 years.

It was rumored that ABC would only offer Major League Baseball about $10 to $15 million less per year than what CBS was reportedly willing to offer for the 1996 season. At the time, it was reported that Major League Baseball was expecting a combined total of over $900 million in rights fees from two networks.

Ultimately, despite the failure of The Baseball Network, NBC decided to retain its relationship with Major League Baseball, but on a far more restricted basis. Under the five-year deal signed on November 7, 1995 (running from the 1996 to 2000 seasons) for a total of approximately $400 million ($80 million per year), NBC did not televise any regular season games. Instead, NBC only handled the All-Star Game, three Division Series games (on Tuesday, Friday, and Saturday nights), and the American League Championship Series in even-numbered years and the World Series, three Division Series games (also on Tuesday, Friday, and Saturday nights) and the National League Championship Series in odd-numbered years. Fox, which assumed ABC's portion of the league broadcast television rights, gained the rights to the Saturday Game of the Week during the regular season, in addition to alternating rights to the All-Star Game, League Championship Series (the ALCS in odd-numbered years and the NLCS in even-numbered years), Division Series, and the World Series.

=== Aftermath ===
After losing its Major League Baseball broadcast rights again, this time to Fox, ABC counterprogrammed against Fox's postseason coverage by airing a mix of miniseries and television films aimed at female viewers. One of the movies aired on ABC, Unforgiven, aired opposite Andy Pettitte's shutout in Game 5 of the 1996 World Series (Fox's first World Series, and the final game in Atlanta–Fulton County Stadium history).

With ABC being sold to The Walt Disney Company in 1996, ESPN picked up daytime and late-evening Division Series games with a provision similar to its National Football League games, in which the games would only air on network affiliates in the local markets of the two participating teams. ESPN's Major League Baseball contract was not affected then, but would take a hit in 1998 with the new NFL contract.

In September 2000, a baseball official, speaking on the condition he not be identified, confirmed ESPN passed on keeping its playoffs rights (thus, giving Fox Sports exclusivity), saying the decision was partly based on price and partly because ABC wasn't interested in the network package.

ABC Family's (now Freeform) coverage of the 2002 Division Series was produced by ESPN. The reason that games were on ABC Family instead of ESPN was because The Walt Disney Company bought Fox Family from News Corporation. The ABC Family/ESPN inherited Division Series package was included in Fox's then exclusive television contract with Major League Baseball (initiated in 2001). ABC Family had no other choice but to fulfill the contract handed to them. The only usage of the ABC Family "bug" was for a ten-second period when returning from a commercial break (in the lower right corner of the screen).

== 2020s ==
ABC would return to airing postseason baseball in 2020. They were scheduled to air at least four of the 24 possible daytime games in the season's first ever expanded eight-series wild card round, that the networks of ESPN will air. Not only did this mean that ABC aired Major League Baseball games of any kind since Game 5 of the 1995 World Series, but it also marked the first time since NBC's final game in 2000, that a Major League Baseball game had aired on any broadcast network other than Fox. It had also been at least 9,105 days since ABC last broadcast a Major League Baseball game.

On May 13, 2021, Major League Baseball and The Walt Disney Company announced an extension to ESPN's contract, which included exclusive rights to the Wild Card series, if the league were to expand it. This includes games being broadcast on ABC under a similar structure to the 2020 Wild Card series.

On July 7, 2021, ESPN announced that a Sunday Night Baseball game between the Chicago Cubs and Chicago White Sox, scheduled for August 8 from Wrigley Field would air exclusively on ABC. This was the first regular season Major League Baseball game to be aired on ABC since August 19, 1995, when ABC was part of the short-lived Baseball Network and also the first ESPN-produced regular season telecast that ABC would air.

On Saturday, September 24, 2022, and again on Saturday, October 1, 2022, during regularly scheduled college football telecasts, ABC aired live look-ins of the YES Network's telecast of the New York Yankees. This was due to Aaron Judge potentially hitting his 61st and 62nd home run of the season. This was a controversial move, many fans complained about the interruptions. Aaron Judge did not hit his record setting home run during the look-ins.

On October 5, 2022, ABC was scheduled to air at least one game from the 2022 Wild Card Series. ABC was also in-line to broadcast a potential third game of the American League Wild Card Series between the Seattle Mariners and Toronto Blue Jays. Ultimately however, Seattle wound up winning the series in two games, thus it wasn't necessary.

On October 1–2, 2024, ABC aired Games 1 and 2 of the American League Wild Card Series between the Detroit Tigers and Houston Astros. The games on ABC were again produced by ESPN, and during the 4th inning of Game 1 from Houston, the graphics department displayed incorrect stats during the players' at-bats. During the top of the 8th inning of Game 2, ABC's broadcast was hit with further technical issues that this time, resulted in poor and out of sync audio quality.

On February 20, 2025, MLB and ESPN agreed to opt-out of their deal at the end of the 2025 season. However, on January 21, 2026, ESPN announced that three Major League Baseball games would air on ABC for the 2026 regular season. The scheduled games are the Chicago Cubs vs. San Francisco Giants on Sunday, June 14, the New York Yankees vs. Boston Red Sox on Saturday, June 27, and the St. Louis Cardinals vs. Chicago Cubs on Sunday, August 16. This comes as part of ESPN's new, restructured three-year package, that calls for 30-game regular season games.
