= Uecker Monument =

Public artwork in Milwaukee, Wisconsin, US

Coordinates: 43.0289°N 87.9726°W

- Artist: Brian Maughan
- Year: August 31, 2012; 13 years ago
- Type: bronze
- Dimensions: 210 cm (84 in)
- Location: Miller Park; Milwaukee, Wisconsin

The Uecker Monument is a public art work by artist Brian Maughan. It is located in front of the American Family Field stadium west of downtown Milwaukee, Wisconsin. The sculpture depicts Bob Uecker, the popular play-by-play announcer for broadcasts of Milwaukee Brewers baseball games. It was dedicated on August 31, 2012.
