= List of MLB Network personalities =

== Hosts and reporters ==
- Greg Amsinger: (2009–present) MLB Tonight, MLB Productions' Player Poll and Carded
- AJ Andrews: (2022–present) Play Ball
- Bob Costas: (2009–present) MLB Tonight, Studio 42 with Bob Costas, and MLB Network Showcase
- Russell Dorsey: (2024–present) Off Base
- Robert Flores: (2016–present) MLB Central and MLB Tonight
- Brian Kenny: (2012–present) MLB Tonight, MLB Now and MLB Network Showcase
- Hannah Keyser: (2022–present) Off Base and MLB Now
- Abby Labar: (2024–present) Quick Pitch
- Taylor McGregor: (2023–present) Quick Pitch and MLB Tonight
- Keith McPherson: (2022–present) Off Base
- Kelly Nash: (2015–present) Quick Pitch
- Melanie Newman: (2022–present) MLB Tonight
- Jackie Redmond: (2018, 2022–present) Quick Pitch
- Siera Santos: (2022–present) Intentional Talk, Quick Pitch, and Hot Stove
- Xavier Scruggs: (2022–present) Off Base
- Paul Severino: (2011–2018, 2025–present) MLB Tonight, Quick Pitch, and MLB Network Strike Zone
- Lauren Shehadi: (2012–present) MLB Central, Hot Stove, Quick Pitch, and MLB Network Countdown
- Matt Vasgersian: (2009–present) Hot Stove, MLB Central, MLB Tonight, MLB Network Showcase, Baseball IQ, and Pregame Spread
- Adnan Virk: (2019–present) MLB Tonight and High Heat
- Erika Wachter: (2021–present) Quick Pitch
- Matt Yallof: (2009–present) MLB Tonight and MLB Network Strike Zone

== Analysts ==
- Yonder Alonso: (2021–present) MLB Tonight
- Ruben Amaro Jr.: (2022–present) MLB Tonight
- Alex Avila: (2022–present) MLB Tonight
- Sean Casey: (2009–present) MLB Tonight
- Ron Darling: (2013–present) MLB Tonight and Hot Stove
- Ryan Dempster: (2014–present) MLB Tonight and Intentional Talk
- Mark DeRosa: (2014–present) MLB Tonight and MLB Central
- Cliff Floyd: (2013–present) MLB Tonight
- Rick Hahn: (2025–present) MLB Tonight
- John Hart: (2009–2014, 2018–present) 30 Clubs in 30 Days; 30 Teams, 30 Report Cards; MLB Tonight
- Eric Hosmer: (2026–present) MLB Tonight and MLB Central
- Al Leiter: (2009–present) MLB Tonight
- Mike Lowell: (2011–present) MLB Tonight
- Pedro Martínez: (2015–present) MLB Tonight
- Kevin Millar: (2010–present) MLB Tonight and Intentional Talk
- Dan O'Dowd: (2015–present) MLB Tonight
- Jake Peavy: (2022–present) MLB Tonight
- Carlos Peña: (2014–present) MLB Tonight
- Dan Plesac: (2009–present) MLB Tonight
- Albert Pujols: (2023–present) MLB Tonight
- Anthony Recker: (2022–present) MLB Tonight
- Harold Reynolds: (2009–present) Hot Stove and MLB Tonight
- Ryan Rowland-Smith: (2024–present) MLB Tonight
- Jim Thome: (2017–present) MLB Tonight
- Adam Wainwright: (2024–present) MLB Tonight
- Chris Young: (2021–present) MLB Tonight

== Insiders ==
- Peter Gammons: (2010–present) MLB.com writer, appears on Hot Stove and MLB Tonight
- Jon Heyman: (2009–present) FanRag Sports and New York Post writer, appears on MLB Tonight
- Jon Morosi: (2016–present) MLB.com writer, appears on Hot Stove, MLB Tonight, and MLB Network Showcase
- Joel Sherman: (2013–present) New York Post senior writer, appears on MLB Tonight
- Jayson Stark: (2018–present) MLB Tonight
- Tom Verducci: (2009–present) Sports Illustrated senior writer, appears on MLB Tonight and MLB Network Showcase

== Former ==
- Larry Bowa: (2011–2013) Hot Stove and MLB Tonight (now Philadelphia Phillies senior adviser to the general manager)
- Scott Braun: (2012–2022) MLB Tonight, Quick Pitch, MLB Network Strike Zone, and MLB Network Showcase (now co-host of Foul Territory podcast)
- Eric Byrnes: (2010–2021) MLB Tonight
- Tony Clark: (2009) MLB Tonight (now executive director of the Major League Baseball Players Association)
- Joey Cora: (2013) MLB Tonight (now Detroit Tigers third base coach)
- Fran Charles: (2013–2022) MLB Tonight, Hot Stove, and MLB Central
- Alexa Datt: (2018–2021) Quick Pitch, The Rundown (now reporter/anchor for Bally Sports Midwest)
- Ariel Epstein: (2022–2025) Off Base and Pregame Spread
- Jamie Erdahl: (2017) Quick Pitch (now co-host of Good Morning Football on NFL Network)
- Ahmed Fareed: (2011–2012) Hot Stove, MLB Tonight and Quick Pitch (now with NBC Sports)
- Kristina Fitzpatrick: (2013–2014) MLB Now and High Heat with Christopher "Mad Dog" Russo (now reporter/anchor for CNN and HLN)
- Tim Flannery: (2015–2017) MLB Tonight
- Ron Gant: (2011–2012) MLB Tonight and Hot Stove (now co-host of Good Day Atlanta on WAGA-TV)
- Lauren Gardner: (2019–2026) Quick Pitch, Hot Stove, and Off Base
- Joe Girardi: (2018–2019) MLB Tonight (now analyst for Marquee Sports Network and YES Network)
- Darryl Hamilton: (2013–2015) MLB Tonight (deceased)
- Jamie Hersch: (2016–2019, 2022–2024) Quick Pitch
- Jim Kaat: (2009–2022) MLB Network Showcase
- Lisa Kerney: (2010–2011) (now with FanDuel TV)
- Trenni Kusnierek: (2009–2010) (now at NBC Sports Boston)
- Barry Larkin: (2009–2011) Hot Stove and MLB Tonight (now analyst for Bally Sports Ohio)
- Hazel Mae: (2009–2011) All Time Games, Hot Stove, MLB Tonight, Quick Pitch and The Rundown (now with Sportsnet)
- Joe Magrane: (2009–2018) MLB Tonight
- Jerry Manuel: (2011–2013) MLB Tonight (now Director of Baseball Operations at William Jessup University in Rocklin, California)
- Keiana Martin: (2022–2023) Quick Pitch (now with CBS Sports)
- Cameron Maybin: (2022) MLB Tonight
- Stephen Nelson: (2018–2023) MLB Tonight, Intentional Talk, and MLB Network Showcase (now with ESPN and secondary play-by-play announcer for Los Angeles Dodgers)
- Hunter Pence: (2022) MLB Tonight
- Bo Porter: (2022–2024) MLB Tonight (now Los Angeles Angels first base coach)
- Leila Rahimi (2014) MLB Network Strike Zone
- Billy Ripken: (2009–2025) MLB Tonight
- Alanna Rizzo: (2012–2013, 2021–2024) MLB Network Countdown, Quick Pitch, and High Heat
- Victor Rojas: (2009–2010) Hot Stove, MLB Tonight, and Thursday Night Baseball (left to join Los Angeles Angels of Anaheim TV play-by-play; now the GM of the Double-A Frisco RoughRiders)
- Chris Rose: (2010–2020) MLB Tonight and Intentional Talk (now employed by Jomboy Media)
- Ken Rosenthal: (2009–2021), Hot Stove, MLB Tonight, and MLB Network Showcase (contract not renewed, reportedly due to criticism of MLB Commissioner Rob Manfred)
- Chris Russo: (2014–2024) High Heat
- Sam Ryan: (2011–2016) MLB Network Showcase, Hot Stove, The Rundown, and Quick Pitch (now weekend sports anchor for WABC-TV)
- John Smoltz: (2010–2022) MLB Network Showcase and MLB Tonight (fired for refusing to get COVID-19 vaccine)
- Mike Sweeney: (2012) MLB Tonight (now a special assistant for Kansas City Royals)
- Dave Valle: (2009–2022) MLB Tonight (now TV analyst for Seattle Mariners)
- Heidi Watney: (2013–2021) Quick Pitch, Hot Stove, and Intentional Talk (now reporter for Apple TV+)
- Mitch Williams: (2009–2014) Hot Stove, MLB Tonight and 30 Clubs in 30 Days (contract terminated)
- Preston Wilson: (2016–2018) MLB Tonight
