= List of Major League Baseball on NBC broadcasters =

== Current ==
=== Play-by-play ===
- Jason Benetti: Sunday Night Baseball play-by-play (2022, 2026–present)
- Matt Vasgersian: MLB Sunday Leadoff play-by-play / #2 Sunday Night Baseball play–by–play (2023, 2026–present)
- Dave Flemming: MLB Sunday Leadoff #2 play–by–play (2026–present)
- Tom McCarthy: MLB Sunday Leadoff #3 play-by-play (2026–present)

=== Guest color commentators ===
- Roger Clemens: Yankees color commentator
- Mark Grant: Padres color commentator
- Ben McDonald: Orioles Color commentator
- Rubén Amaro Jr.: Phillies Color commentator
- Brian Roberts: Orioles color commentator
- Jeff Brantley: Reds color commentator
- Steve Stone: White Sox color commentator
- Sam LeCure: Reds color commentator
- Vinny Rottino: Brewers color commentator
- Dan Plesac: White Sox color commentator
- Hunter Pence: Giants color commentator
- Caleb Joseph: Blue Jays color commentator
- Joe Girardi: Yankees color commentator
- Andy Dirks: Tigers color commentator
- Tim Dillard: Brewers color commentator
- Will Middlebrooks: Red Sox color commentator
- Geoff Blum: Astros color commentator
- Dallas Braden: Athletics color commentator
- Jim Deshaies: Cubs color commentator
- Orel Hershiser: Dodgers color commentator
- Eric Hosmer: Royals color commentator
- Trevor Plouffe: Twins color commentator
- Dexter Fowler: Blue Jays color commentator
- John Franco: Mets color commentator
- Kevin Frandsen: Nationals color commentator
- Lou Merloni: Red Sox color commentator
- Bob Walk: Pirates color commentator
- Gaby Sánchez: Marlins color commentator
- Brian Anderson: Rays color commentator
- Jim Palmer: Orioles color commentator
- Jeff Nelson: Marlins color commentator
- Jake Peavy: Padres color commentator
- Luis Gonzalez: Diamondbacks color commentator
- Andruw Jones: Braves color commentator
- Corey Kluber: Guardians color commentator
- Al Leiter: Mets color commentator
- Rick Manning: Guardians color commentator
- Albert Pujols: Cardinals color commentator
- Ryan Rowland-Smith: Mariners color commentator
- Brad Thompson: Cardinals color commentator
- Neil Walker: Pirates color commentator
- Mark Gubicza: Angels color commentator
- David Murphy: Rangers color commentator
- Matt Capps: Pirates color commentator
- Justin Morneau: Twins color commentator
- Mike Bacsik: Rangers color commentator
- Dan Petry: Tigers color commentator
- John Kruk: Phillies color commentator
- C. J. Nitkowski: Braves color commentator

=== Sunday Leadoff reporters ===
- John Fanta: Lead Sunday Leadoff reporter (2026–present)
- Caroline Pineda: #2 Sunday Leadoff reporter (2026–present)
- Ashley ShahAhmadi: #3 Sunday Leadoff reporter (2026–present)
- Erica Weston: Alternate Sunday Leadoff reporter (2026-present)
- Jordan Cornette: Alternate Sunday Leadoff reporter (2026–present)
- Britney Eurton- reporter 2026 MLB Playoffs(2026-present)

=== Pregame hosts ===
- Bob Costas: lead pregame host (2026–present)
- Ahmed Fareed: pregame host (2022–2023, 2026–present)
- John Fanta: alternate pregame host (2026–present)
- Ashley ShahAhmadi: alternate pregame host (2026–present)

=== Studio analysts ===
- Dexter Fowler: pregame studio analyst and Blue Jays game analyst (2026–present)
- Clayton Kershaw: pregame studio analyst and Inside The Pitch analyst (2026–present)
- Adam Ottavino: pregame studio analyst and #2 Inside the Pitch analyst (2026–present)
- Anthony Rizzo: pregame studio analyst and #1 Inside the Pitch analyst (2026–present)
- CC Sabathia: alternate pregame studio and Inside the Pitch analyst (2026–present)
- Joey Votto: pregame studio analyst and Inside the Pitch analyst (2026–present)
- Eric Hosmer: alternative Inside the Pitch Analyst and playoff studio analyst (2026–present)

== Former ==
=== A ===
- Marv Albert In 1979, Albert, who had called backup play-by-play for NBC baseball earlier in the decade, became the network's pregame host for the series Major League Baseball: An Inside Look. When former Yale University president Bart Giamatti was named president of the National League in 1986, Albert japed to St. Louis Cardinals manager Whitey Herzog that there now would be "an opening for you at Yale." Herzog retorted by saying "I don't think that's funny, Marv!"
- Mel Allen (1951–1953; 1955–1958; 1960–1963)
- Sparky Anderson (1979 American League Championship Series)

=== B ===
- Sal Bando (1982)
- Red Barber (1948 World Series and 1952 World Series)
- Johnny Bench (1994)
- Len Berman
- Buddy Blattner (1964; 1969)
- Marty Brennaman (1975 World Series and 1976 World Series)
- Jack Brickhouse (1954 World Series, 1959 World Series, and 1951–1953 All-Star Games)
- Jim Britt
- Jack Buck (1965 All-Star Game and Game of the Week announcer in 1976)
- Brendan Burke (2023)

=== C ===
- Harry Caray (1964 World Series, 1967 World Series, and 1968 World Series)
- Skip Caray (called all Division Series games in 2000 while Bob Costas was concluding his Olympic hosting duties from Sydney, Australia)
- Ken Coleman (1967 World Series)

=== D ===
- Byron Day
- Bucky Dent
- Don Drysdale (1977)
- Leo Durocher (1957–1959)

=== E ===
- Gene Elston (1968 All-Star Game)
- Dick Enberg (1977–1982)
- Bill Enis (1972–1973)

=== G ===
- Joe Garagiola (1961–1964; 1974–1988)
- Gayle Gardner (1989) In 1989, Gardner became the first female to regularly host Major League Baseball coverage for a television network.
- Bob Gibson
- Curt Gowdy (1958 World Series, 1st 1959 All-Star Game, 1st 1960 All-Star Game, 2nd 1961 All-Star Game, 2nd 1962 All-Star Game, and 1964 World Series; 1966–1975)
- Jim Gray (1995–2000)
- Bryant Gumbel (1976–1981)
- Greg Gumbel (1994–1995)

=== H ===
- Fred Haney (1960)
- Merle Harmon (1980–1981)
- Ernie Harwell
- Ken Harrelson (1984–1987)
- Al Helfer (1955–1958 All-Star Games and 1957 World Series)
- Russ Hodges (1951 World Series, 1954 World Series, and 1962 World Series, 2nd 1959 All-Star Game, and 1st 1961 All-Star Game)
- Tom Hussey

=== J ===
- Charlie Jones (1977–1979)

=== K ===
- Jim Kaat (1984–1986)
- George Kell (1962 National League playoff, 2nd 1962 All-Star Game, and 1968 World Series)
- Gene Kelly
- Sandy Koufax (1967–1972) In 1971, Koufax signed a ten-year contract with NBC for $1 million to be a broadcaster on the Saturday Game of the Week. Koufax never felt comfortable being in front of the camera; he quit before the 1973 season.
- Tony Kubek (1965–1989)

=== L ===
- Barry Larkin (1999 World Series)
- Guy LeBow
- John Lowenstein
- Ron Luciano (1980–1981)

=== M ===
- Bill Macatee (1982–1989) Macatee joined NBC in 1982, where he hosted and reported on a variety of major events including late-night coverage of Wimbledon and the World Series, as well as the pre-game shows for the League Championship Series, Super Bowl XVII, and college football bowl games.
- Mickey Mantle (1969–1970)
- Ned Martin (1975 World Series)
- Tim McCarver (1980)
- Jim McIntyre (1970 World Series)
- Al Michaels (1972 World Series)
- Jon Miller (1986–1989) Miller would call games for NBC on their occasional doubleheader weeks. If not that, then Miller would appear on Saturday afternoon regionals the day after NBC's occasional prime time telecasts.
- Joe Morgan (1986–1987, 1994–2000)
- Monte Moore (1972 World Series, 1973 World Series, 1974 World Series, and Game of the Week announcer from 1978–1980; 1983)

=== N ===
- Lindsey Nelson (1957–1961; 1964, 1971 All-Star Game, 1969 World Series, and 1973 World Series) When NBC got baseball with Lindsey Nelson and Leo Durocher, for a while, the backup team was Chuck Thompson and Bill Veeck.

=== O ===
- Bill O'Donnell (1969–1976)
- Keith Olbermann (1997–1998)

=== P ===
- Wes Parker (1979 American League Championship Series and Game of the Week announcer from 1978 to 1979)
- Freddie Patek (1982–1983)
- Van Patrick (1948 World Series)
- Bob Prince (1960 World Series and 1971 World Series)
- Mel Proctor (1989)

=== R ===
- Jay Randolph (1982–1989)
- Pee Wee Reese (1966–1968)
- Phil Rizzuto (1964 World Series and 1976 World Series)
- Jimmy Roberts (2000)
- Ted Robinson (1986–1989)
- Al Rosen (1959–1960)

=== S ===
- Craig Sager (1999 National League Championship Series and 1999 World Series)
- Ray Scott (1960; 1965 World Series)
- Vin Scully (2nd 1959 All-Star Game, 2nd 1962 All-Star Game, 1963 All-Star Game, 1953 World Series, 1955–1956 World Series, 1963 World Series, 1965–1966 World Series, and 1974 World Series; Primary play by play 1983–1989)
- Tom Seaver (postseason telecasts only from 1978–1984 and Game of the Week announcer in 1989)
- Mike Shannon
- Jim Simpson (1966–1977; 1979)
- Bill Slater
- Duke Snider (1983 National League Championship Series)
- Bob Stanton
- Dick Stockton (1975 World Series)
- Phil Stone (1982–1985)
- Hannah Storm (1994–2000)
- Don Sutton (1979 National League Championship Series, 1983 All-Star Game, and pre and post-game analyst for NBC's coverage of the 1987 League Championship Series)

=== T ===
- Chuck Thompson (1958–1960; 1966 World Series, 1970 World Series, and 1971 World Series)
- Joe Torre (1988–1989)

=== U ===
- Bob Uecker (1994–1997)

=== V ===
- Bill Veeck (1958)

=== W ===
- Dick Williams (1974)
- Maury Wills (1973–1977)
- Bob Wischusen (2000 American League Division Series)
- Bob Wolff (1962–1965)
- Jim Woods (1957)

== See also ==
- List of current Major League Baseball broadcasters
- The Baseball Network announcers
