= Bob Uecker =

American baseball player and broadcaster (1934–2025)

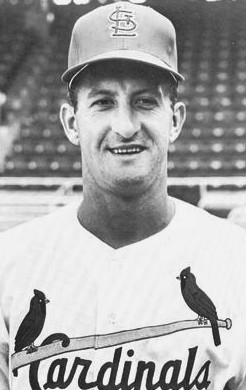
- Uecker with the St. Louis Cardinals in 1965
- Catcher
- Born: January 26, 1934; Milwaukee, Wisconsin, U.S.
- Died: January 16, 2025 (aged 90); Menomonee Falls, Wisconsin, U.S.
- Batted: Right Threw: Right

MLB debut
- April 13, 1962, for the Milwaukee Braves

Last MLB appearance
- September 29, 1967, for the Atlanta Braves

MLB statistics
- Batting average: .200
- Home runs: 14
- Runs batted in: 74
- Stats at Baseball Reference

Teams
- As player: Milwaukee Braves (1962–1963); St. Louis Cardinals (1964–1965); Philadelphia Phillies (1966–1967); Atlanta Braves (1967); As broadcaster: Milwaukee Brewers (1971–2024)

Career highlights and awards
- World Series champion (1964); Ford C. Frick Award (2003); Milwaukee Brewers Wall of Honor; American Family Field Walk of Fame; Milwaukee Brewers "microphone" honored

Robert George Uecker (/ˈjuːkər/ YOO-kər; January 26, 1934 – January 16, 2025), affectionately called "Ueck", was an American professional baseball catcher and sportscaster who served as the play-by-play announcer for the Milwaukee Brewers of Major League Baseball (MLB) for 54 seasons. He was also an occasional television and film actor.

Uecker signed with his hometown Milwaukee Braves in 1956, spending several years in the minor leagues with various affiliate clubs before making his major league debut in 1962. As a backup catcher, he played for the Milwaukee Braves, St. Louis Cardinals, Philadelphia Phillies, and Atlanta Braves from 1962 to 1967. He won a World Series with the Cardinals in 1964.

After retiring, Uecker started a broadcasting career and served as the primary broadcaster for Milwaukee Brewers radio broadcasts from 1971. Uecker became known for his self-deprecating wit and became a regular fixture on late night talk shows in the 1970s and 1980s, facetiously dubbed "Mr. Baseball" by talk show host Johnny Carson. He hosted several sports blooper shows and had an acting career that included his role as George Owens on the television program Mr. Belvedere and as play-by-play announcer Harry Doyle in the film Major League and its two sequels.

In 2003, Uecker received the Ford C. Frick Award, the National Baseball Hall of Fame's annual award for broadcasters.

== Early life ==
Though he sometimes joked that he had been born on an oleo run to nearby Illinois (margarine was prohibited in the dairy state of Wisconsin for many years) on January 26, 1934, Uecker was born and raised in Milwaukee. He was the son of Michigan native Mary (née Schultz) and August "Gus" Uecker. August Uecker had emigrated from Switzerland in 1923. Bob also had two younger sisters, Carol Ann and Rosemary. He grew up watching the minor-league Milwaukee Brewers of the American Association at Borchert Field.

Uecker enlisted in the US Army in 1954, ultimately achieving the rank of corporal. He played baseball while at Fort Leonard Wood in Missouri and Fort Belvoir in Virginia, where he was teammates with future fellow major leaguer Dick Groat.

== Playing career ==
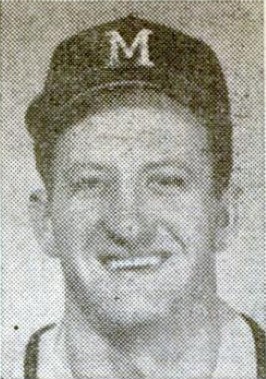
Uecker with the Braves in 1962

After his Army service, Uecker signed a professional contract with his hometown Milwaukee Braves in 1956. With the Braves organization, Uecker played in the minor leagues. In his first season, he played in with the Eau Claire Bears in the Northern League and Boise Braves in the Pioneer League. Between both of the clubs, he hit 19 home runs.

Uecker made his major league debut with the club on April 13, 1962. He served as their third-string catcher behind Joe Torre and Del Crandall; Uecker batted .250 in 33 games. He appeared in nine games for the Braves in 1963 before he was demoted to the minor leagues. Before the 1964 season, the Braves traded Uecker to the St. Louis Cardinals for minor leaguers Jimmie Coker and Gary Kolb. Uecker would later quip that, "I was the first hometown player to be called up to the Braves and the first to be sent out by the Braves; I always thought that was nice." He seldom played for the Cardinals, but was a member of the 1964 World Series champions with the Cardinals. After the 1965 season, the Cardinals traded Uecker, Dick Groat, and Bill White to the Philadelphia Phillies for Pat Corrales, Alex Johnson, and Art Mahaffey. On June 6, 1967, the Phillies traded Uecker back to the Braves, now based in Atlanta, for Gene Oliver. His six-year major league career concluded in 1967.

A below-average hitter, he finished with a career batting average of .200, retroactively at the Mendoza Line, though with four of his seasons ending above .200. He was generally considered to be a sound defensive player and committed very few errors as a catcher, completing his career with a fielding percentage of .981. However, in 1967, despite playing only 59 games, he led the league in passed balls. At least a partial explanation is that he spent a good deal of the season catching Phil Niekro, who threw a knuckleball. Uecker often joked that the best way to catch a knuckleball was to wait until it stopped rolling and pick it up.

== Broadcasting career ==
Bob Uecker was honored alongside the retired numbers of the Milwaukee Brewers in 2025.

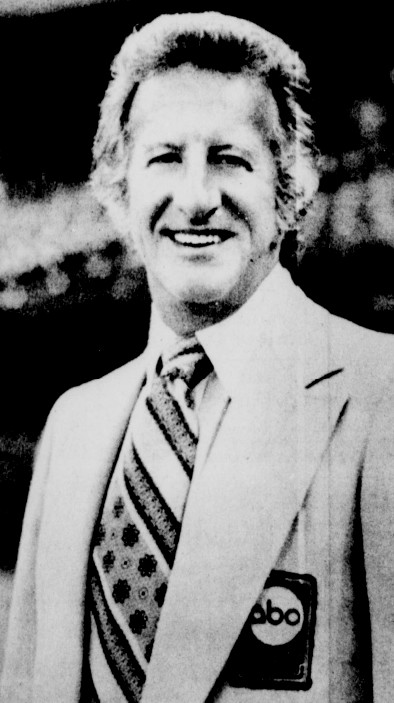
Uecker in 1977

After retiring as a player, Uecker became a broadcaster, starting with WSB-TV in Atlanta. In 1971, he began calling play-by-play for the Milwaukee Brewers' radio broadcasts. Uecker's 54 seasons as a Brewers broadcaster was the second-longest continuous tenure with one team among active Major League Baseball announcers, after Kansas City Royals broadcaster Denny Matthews (1969–present).

In the baseball off-season, Uecker was the radio color commentator for University of Wisconsin–Milwaukee Panthers men's basketball and football games carried by WTMJ (620) and WTMJ-FM (94.5) in the early 1970s.

During his Brewers tenure, Uecker mentored Pat Hughes, Jim Powell, Cory Provus and Joe Block, all of whom became primary radio announcers for other MLB teams. He called the 1982 World Series locally for the Brewers on WTMJ (620) in Milwaukee.

For several years, he also served as a color commentator for network television broadcasts of Major League Baseball, helping call games for ABC in the 1970s and early 1980s and NBC (teaming with Bob Costas and Joe Morgan) in the 1990s. During that time, he was a commentator for several All-Star Games, League Championship Series, and World Series.

At NBC, Uecker was a color commentator for the 1994 and 1996 All-Star Games, 1995 and 1996 American League Championship Series, 1997 National League Championship Series, and the 1995 and 1997 World Series. Uecker left NBC ahead of the 1998 All-Star Game from Coors Field in Denver, Colorado. For the remainder of NBC's MLB contract (1998–2000), only Bob Costas and Joe Morgan called the games. Uecker underwent a back operation in which four discs were replaced.

His most famous catchphrase was "Get up! Get up! Get outta here! Gone!" when a Brewers player hit a home run.

In 2014, health problems led Uecker to reduce his workload, travel less, and call fewer road games.

Until the 2021 season, Uecker had never signed a contract with the Brewers to do the team's play-by-play; instead, he worked under an undisclosed number of handshake agreements with team owners Bud Selig or Mark Attanasio. In 2021, he signed a contract in order to be covered under the Brewers' health insurance plan after cuts to his SAG-AFTRA benefits for acting work.

From 2022 to 2024, Uecker teamed with Jeff Levering and Lane Grindle to call Brewers home games and road games in Chicago on WTMJ in Milwaukee and the Brewers Radio Network throughout Wisconsin.

Uecker's final broadcast was Game 3 of the National League Wild Card Series between the Milwaukee Brewers and New York Mets on October 3, 2024.

== Sports expertise outside baseball ==
Uecker's sports expertise extended beyond baseball. He hosted two syndicated television shows, Bob Uecker's Wacky World of Sports and Bob Uecker's War of the Stars. The former has since become known as The Lighter Side of Sports (albeit with a different host, Mike Golic) and remains one of the longest-running syndicated sports programs in American television history.

Uecker appeared in commercials for the Milwaukee Admirals of the American Hockey League in the mid-1990s, including one in which he re-designed the team's uniforms to feature a garish plaid reminiscent of the loud sports coats he wore in the 1970s and 1980s. In February 2006, the Admirals commemorated those commercials by wearing the plaid jerseys during a game. The jerseys were then auctioned off to benefit charity.

== Wrestling announcer ==
In March 1987, Uecker appeared at World Wrestling Federation's (WWF, now WWE) WrestleMania III in Pontiac, Michigan, as the ring announcer for the pay-per-view's main event of Hulk Hogan versus André the Giant. He returned in 1988 at WrestleMania IV as a ringside announcer, commentator during the opening Battle Royal and backstage interviewer.

== Humor ==
Known for his humor, particularly about his undistinguished playing career, Uecker actually became much better known after he retired from playing. Most of his wisecracks poked fun at himself. He once joked that after he hit a grand slam off pitcher Ron Herbel (on June 21, 1967), "When his manager came out to get him, he was bringing Herbel's suitcase." On another occasion, he quipped, "Sporting goods companies would pay me not to endorse their products." When talking about the home run he hit off Dodger great Sandy Koufax, Uecker, having only hit 14 career home runs, said he hoped that homer wouldn't keep Koufax out of the Hall of Fame.

He made some 100 guest appearances on Johnny Carson's Tonight Show. Uecker hosted Saturday Night Live during its 10th season on October 13, 1984.

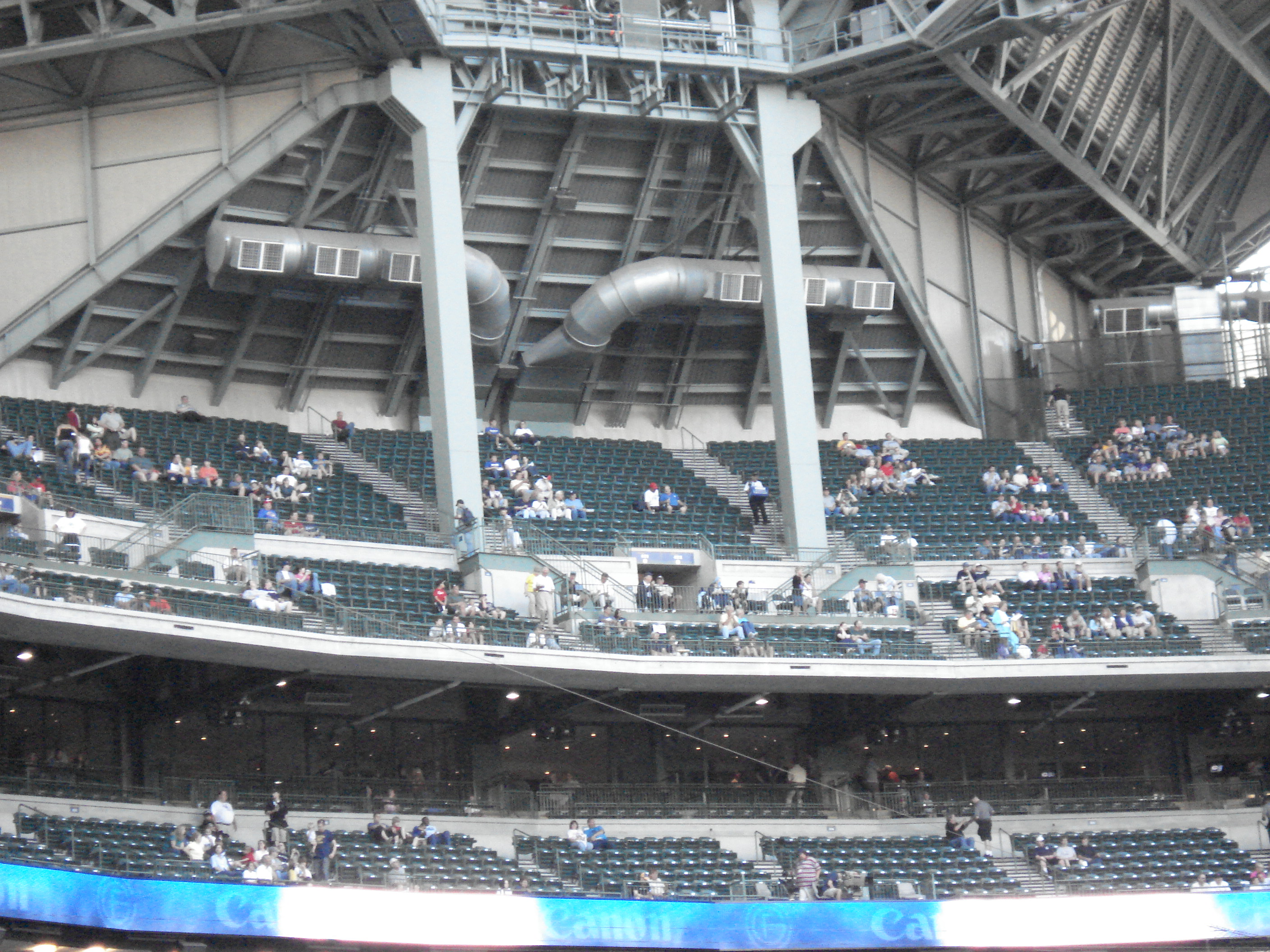
The "Uecker seats"

Uecker appeared in Miller Lite commercials starting in the 1980s. In his best-known commercial, he prepares to watch a baseball game when an usher informs him he is in the wrong seat. Uecker pompously remarks, "I must be in the front row", but is instead escorted to the nosebleed section, where he cries, "He missed the tag!" Both quotes became catchphrases. Since then, the farthest seats from the action in some arenas and stadiums have been jokingly called "Uecker seats". At American Family Field, the Milwaukee Brewers' current home venue, the name is applied to obstructed-view seats in the upper grandstand above home plate where the stadium's roof pivot comes together.

Uecker endorsed several companies and products in Milwaukee, including the Milwaukee Admirals, Rank & Son Buick, Usinger's Sausage. He also contributed to the Wisconsin Department of Tourism for its "You're Among Friends" campaign and several road and bicycle safety campaigns for the Wisconsin Department of Transportation. In his ads, Uecker's persona was usually an overly jovial, happy-go-lucky person who was oblivious to the fact that those around him were less than impressed with his presence. He was inducted into the Wisconsin Advertising Hall of Fame in 2017 by the United Adworkers Milwaukee, Local 99.

Uecker wrote two books: an autobiography, Catcher in the Wry with Mickey Herskowitz, and Catch 222. (The titles are wordplay on the novels Catcher in the Rye and Catch-22.)

== Acting roles ==
Uecker played the character of father and sportswriter George Owens on the 1985–1990 sitcom Mr. Belvedere, appearing regularly. He made cameo appearances as himself in the films O.C. and Stiggs, and Fatal Instinct, and in episodes of the sitcoms Who's the Boss?, D.C. Follies, and LateLine. He was the voice of the "head of Bob Uecker" in the Futurama episode "A Leela of Her Own".

Uecker played Harry Doyle, the broadcaster for the Cleveland Indians (now Cleveland Guardians), in the Major League film trilogy. In the movies, Uecker's character is known for his witticisms and his tendency to become intoxicated from drinking during losing games, as well as downplaying poor play by the team for the radio audience: for example, in the first film he also coins another popular sports catchphrase "Juuust a bit outside", to downplay an extremely wild pitch from Ricky "Wild Thing" Vaughn (played by Charlie Sheen). Uecker received the role not because of his broadcasting history with the Brewers but because of his popular Miller Lite commercials.

In 2021, Uecker made a guest appearance in the Disney+ series Monsters at Work where he voiced a parody of himself named "Bob Yucker".

== Honors ==
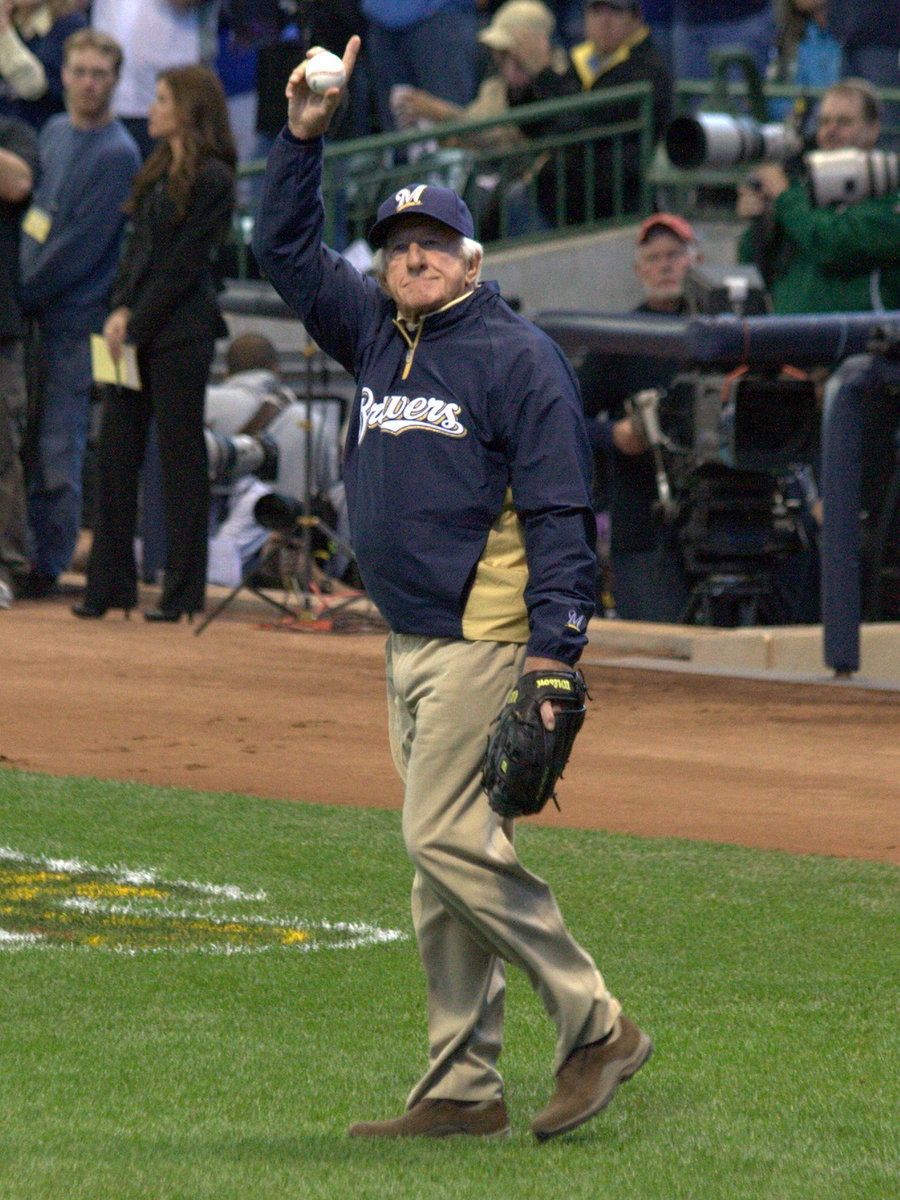
Throwing out a pitch in 2011

The National Sportscasters and Sportswriters Association named Uecker as Wisconsin Sportscaster of the Year five times (1977, 1979, 1981, 1982, 1987), and inducted him into its Hall of Fame in 2011.

Uecker was inducted into the National Radio Hall of Fame in 2001. In 2003, he received the Ford C. Frick Award, bestowed annually by the Baseball Hall of Fame to a broadcaster for "major contributions to baseball". His humorous and self-deprecating speech was a highlight of the ceremony.

In 2005, Uecker's 50th year in professional baseball, the Milwaukee Brewers placed a number 50 in his honor in their "Ring of Honor", near the retired numbers of Robin Yount and Paul Molitor. Four years later, on May 12, 2009, Uecker's name was also added to the Brewers Wall of Honor inside American Family Field.

Uecker was inducted into the Celebrity Wing of the WWE Hall of Fame in 2010, honored for his appearances at WrestleMania III and WrestleMania IV.

On August 31, 2012, the Brewers erected the Uecker Monument outside American Family Field alongside statues of Hank Aaron, Robin Yount and Bud Selig.

Wisconsin Governor Tony Evers declared September 25, 2021, as Bob Uecker Day in honor of his 50th year broadcasting Brewers games. Uecker threw out the first pitch in the game against the New York Mets. But instead of throwing the ball to the catcher, he unveiled a pitching machine and used that. Before the game, left fielder Christian Yelich presented a gift on behalf of the players, a pair of custom Nike sneakers with "Air Uecker" and "Get Up, Get Up" on one foot and "One Of Us" and "Just a Bit Outside" (see reference in the section above) on the other.

A 100-foot (30 m)-tall mural honoring Uecker was unveiled in downtown Milwaukee in summer 2026. The Brewers dedicated their 2026 World Series championship to Uecker.

== Personal life ==
Uecker and his first wife, Joyce (died 2015), had four children: Leeann (1957–2022), who died of ALS in March 2022; Steve (1959–2012), a cowboy, who died of complications of San Joaquin Valley fever; Sue Ann; and Bob Jr.

Uecker and his second wife, Judy, were married in Louisiana in 1976. They settled in the Milwaukee suburb of Menomonee Falls.

Raised in the Catholic Church, Uecker remained devout throughout his life. In 2015, Archbishop Jerome Listecki of Milwaukee highlighted Uecker's faith as a source of strength and guidance. He attributed his career and personal life to his religious faith, reflecting on his background and work as a broadcaster. On the subject of his beliefs, he stated, "Faith isn't about being perfect. It's about trusting God through it all. Uecker's faith also informed his perspective on humor. He believed that laughter was a gift from God, meant to bring joy and healing to others.

=== Illness and death ===
Uecker's grave at Wood National Cemetery

On April 27, 2010, Uecker announced that he was going to miss 10–12 weeks of the 2010 baseball season because of heart surgery. His aortic valve and a portion of his aortic root were successfully replaced four days later, and he returned to broadcasting for the Brewers on July 23. On October 14, 2010, the Brewers announced Uecker would again undergo heart surgery, this time to repair a tear at the site of his valve replacement.

Uecker was diagnosed with small-cell lung cancer in 2023. He died at his Menomonee Falls home on January 16, 2025, at the age of 90, and was buried at Wood National Cemetery in Milwaukee.

== Books ==
- Uecker, Bob (with Mickey Herskowitz) (1982). Catcher in the Wry. Penguin Publishing Group. ISBN 978-0-399-12586-7.
- Uecker, Bob (1992). Catch 222. Putnam Pub Group. ISBN 978-0-399-13744-0.

Sporting positions
Preceded by Tom Seaver (in 1989)	Lead color commentator, Major League Baseball on NBC; 1994–1997 (with Joe Morgan)	Succeeded by Joe Morgan (solo)
