= Paul Severino =

American sportscaster and studio host (born 1983)

- Born: October 5, 1983 (age 42); Bristol, Connecticut, U.S.
- Sports commentary career
- Team(s): Miami Marlins (2018–2024); Washington Nationals (2026–present)
- Genre: Play-by-play
- Sport: Major League Baseball

Paul Severino (born October 5, 1983) is an American sportscaster and studio host appearing across MLB Network's programming, including MLB Tonight, MLB Network's Emmy Award-winning daily studio show and is also the fill in play–by–play announcer for the Washington Nationals. Severino joined MLB Network in January 2011. He was hired to be the new TV play by play voice of the Miami Marlins for Bally Sports Florida in 2018 which he held until the end of the 2024 season. Severino appears in Play by Play camps for kids.

== Career ==
In addition to his studio work, Severino has done play-by-play for many MLB Network game telecasts, including the Arizona Fall League, the Triple-A All-Star Game, the Under Armour All-American Game and the Urban Invitational.

Prior to MLB Network, Severino served as a host and anchor across ESPN's programming, including ESPNews and "SportsCenter" on ESPN America.

Severino also anchored ESPN3.com halftime shows for NBA and NCAA football games, hosted "Fantasy Focus" on ESPN.com, and served as a play-by-play announcer for Pop Warner Championships at Disney's Wide World of Sports in 2008 and 2009.

Severino is a native of Bristol, Connecticut, and graduated from Endicott College in Beverly, Massachusetts.
