= List of MLB on TBS broadcasters =

== 2000s ==
=== 2007 personalities ===
TBS disclosed its initial roster of postseason announcers on September 21, 2007.

==== Play-by-play ====
- Chip Caray: #1 Play-by-play
- Dick Stockton
- Ted Robinson
- Don Orsillo

==== Color commentators ====
- Tony Gwynn: #1 color commentator – 2 Braves games during September 2007
- Bob Brenly
- Ron Darling
- Steve Stone
- Joe Simpson
- Buck Martinez

==== Field reporters ====
- David Aldridge
- Marc Fein
- José Mota
- Craig Sager – 2 Braves games in September 2007.

==== Studio host ====
- Ernie Johnson

==== Studio analysts ====
- Curtis Granderson – guest analyst
- Cal Ripken
- John Smoltz – guest analyst
- Frank Thomas

==== 2007 playoffs ====
On January 28, 2007, TBS' executive producer Jeff Behnke said that Chip Caray "is definitely going to be TBS' lead play-by-play announcer for division series and LCS games." Indeed, TBS announced in April 2007 that Baseball Hall of Famer Tony Gwynn, who has experience in broadcasting with ESPN and the San Diego Padres, would join Caray in the booth.

Veteran Braves play-by-play man Skip Caray, Chip's father was vocal about not being part of the coverage in comments he made to The Atlanta Journal-Constitution.

TBS' studio team was Inside the NBA host Ernie Johnson along with the other member of the 2007 Baseball Hall of Fame class, Cal Ripken. On September 24, it was announced that the studio show would also include Frank Thomas, who played for the Toronto Blue Jays during the season. Thomas and other active players such as Curtis Granderson and John Smoltz made guest appearances during the playoffs. The studio coverage is titled Inside MLB.

=== 2008 personalities ===
In the 2008 season, Chip Caray, Ron Darling, and Buck Martinez formed the lead broadcast crew for Sunday games on TBS. Darling and Martinez have taken turns as analysts.

Marc Fein, the last TBS Braves Baseball studio host, had the same duties here, providing updates throughout the day from other MLB games. Johnson also hosts from time-to-time.

TBS disclosed its initial roster of postseason announcers on September 18, 2008.

==== Play-by-play ====
- Chip Caray
- Dick Stockton – some regular season games and MLB playoffs
- Don Orsillo – some regular season games and MLB playoffs
- Brian Anderson (first time an announcer broadcast games for the team he was affiliated – the Milwaukee Brewers)

==== Color commentators ====
- Ron Darling
- Buck Martinez
- Tony Gwynn – MLB playoffs only
- Harold Reynolds – select regular season and MLB playoffs
- Joe Simpson – MLB playoffs only
- John Smoltz – MLB playoffs only

==== Field reporters ====
- Tom Verducci
- Craig Sager
- Marc Fein
- David Aldridge

==== Studio host ====
- Ernie Johnson

==== Studio analysts ====
- Cal Ripken
- Dennis Eckersley
- Curtis Granderson – guest analyst

=== 2009 personalities ===
==== Play-by-play ====
- Chip Caray
- Don Orsillo – some regular season games and MLB playoffs
- Dick Stockton – some regular season games and MLB playoffs
- Brian Anderson

==== Color commentators ====
- Ron Darling
- Buck Martinez
- David Wells – select regular season games
- Dennis Eckersley – one or two regular season games
- Bob Brenly – MLB playoffs only
- Joe Simpson – MLB playoffs only

==== Field reporters ====
- Craig Sager
- Marc Fein
- Tom Verducci
- David Aldridge

==== Studio host ====
- Ernie Johnson

==== Studio analysts ====
- Dennis Eckersley
- Cal Ripken
- David Wells

== 2010s ==
=== 2010 personalities ===
==== Play-by-play ====
- Ernie Johnson
- Brian Anderson
- Dick Stockton – select regular season games and MLB playoffs
- Don Orsillo

==== Color commentators ====
- Ron Darling
- John Smoltz
- Joe Simpson – MLB playoffs only
- Bob Brenly – MLB playoffs only
- Buck Martinez – MLB playoffs only
- Dennis Eckersley – one or two regular season games
- David Wells – select regular season games

==== Field reporters ====
- Craig Sager
- David Aldridge
- Tom Verducci
- Marc Fein

==== Studio host ====
- Matt Winer

==== Studio analysts ====
- Dennis Eckersley
- Cal Ripken
- David Wells

=== 2011 personalities ===
==== Play-by-play ====
- Brian Anderson
- Dick Stockton – select regular season games and MLB Playoffs
- Don Orsillo (Playoffs)
- Victor Rojas (Playoffs)
- Ernie Johnson – Because of Johnson stepping aside for the 2011 playoffs to care for his son Michael, who has Muscular dystrophy and was placed in intensive care around the same time as the playoffs, Brian Anderson instead called the 2011 National League Championship Series for TBS, which only by coincidence has the Brewers against the Cardinals. Anderson's role was announced before the playoff seedings for the NLDS were fully set.
- Matt Vasgersian – select regular season games
- Steve Physioc – select regular season games

==== Color commentators ====
- Ron Darling
- John Smoltz
- Bob Brenly – MLB playoffs only
- Buck Martinez – MLB playoffs only
- Joe Simpson – MLB playoffs only
- Dennis Eckersley – 1 or 2 regular season games
- David Wells – select regular season games

==== Field reporters ====
- Craig Sager
- Tom Verducci
- Jaime Maggio
- Sam Ryan

==== Studio host ====
- Matt Winer

==== Studio analysts ====
- Dennis Eckersley
- Cal Ripken
- David Wells

=== 2012 personalities ===
==== Play-by-play ====
- Ernie Johnson
- Brian Anderson
- Dick Stockton – select regular season games and MLB Playoffs
- Don Orsillo
- Steve Physioc – select regular season games

==== Color commentators ====
- Ron Darling
- John Smoltz
- Cal Ripken – MLB playoffs only
- Joe Simpson – MLB playoffs only
- Bob Brenly – MLB playoffs only
- Buck Martinez – MLB playoffs only
- Dennis Eckersley – one or two regular season games
- David Wells – select regular season games

==== Field reporters ====
- Craig Sager
- Tom Verducci
- David Aldridge
- Jaime Maggio

==== Studio host ====
- Matt Winer

==== Studio analysts ====
- Dennis Eckersley
- Cal Ripken
- David Wells
- Shane Victorino – guest analyst

=== 2013 personalities ===
==== Play-by-play ====
- Ernie Johnson
- Brian Anderson
- Dick Stockton – select regular season games and MLB playoffs
- Don Orsillo
- Matt Devlin – select regular season games
- Steve Physioc – select regular season games

==== Color commentators ====
- Ron Darling
- Cal Ripken – MLB playoffs only
- John Smoltz
- Joe Simpson – MLB playoffs only
- Bob Brenly – MLB playoffs only
- Dennis Eckersley – select regular season games and MLB playoffs
- Buck Martinez – MLB playoffs only
- Tom Verducci

==== Field reporters ====
- Craig Sager
- Rachel Nichols
- Matt Winer
- David Aldridge

==== Studio host ====
- Keith Olbermann

==== Studio analysts ====
- Pedro Martínez
- Dirk Hayhurst
- Tom Verducci
- Mark DeRosa – guest analyst
- Gary Sheffield
- Adam Jones – guest analyst

=== 2014 personalities ===
==== Play-by-play ====
- Ernie Johnson
- Brian Anderson
- Dick Stockton – select regular season games

==== Color commentators ====
- Ron Darling
- Dennis Eckersley – select regular season games and MLB playoffs
- Cal Ripken – MLB playoffs only
- Joe Simpson – MLB playoffs only

==== Field reporters ====
- Matt Winer
- Jaime Maggio

==== Studio host ====
- Casey Stern

==== Studio analysts ====
- Gary Sheffield
- Pedro Martínez
- Todd Frazier – guest analyst

=== 2015 personalities ===
==== Play-by-play ====
- Ernie Johnson
- Brian Anderson
- Dick Stockton – select regular season games

==== Color commentators ====
- Ron Darling
- Dennis Eckersley – select regular season games and MLB playoffs
- Cal Ripken – MLB playoffs only
- Joe Simpson – MLB playoffs only

==== Field reporters ====
- Sam Ryan
- Matt Winer

==== Studio host ====
- Casey Stern

==== Studio analysts ====
- Gary Sheffield
- Pedro Martínez
- Dusty Baker

=== 2016 personalities ===
==== Play-by-play ====
- Ernie Johnson
- Brian Anderson
- Don Orsillo – select regular season games

==== Color commentators ====
- Ron Darling
- Dennis Eckersley – select regular season games and MLB playoffs
- Cal Ripken – MLB playoffs only
- Joe Simpson – MLB playoffs only

==== Field reporters ====
- Sam Ryan
- Matt Winer

==== Studio host ====
- Casey Stern

==== Studio analysts ====
- Gary Sheffield
- Pedro Martínez
- Jimmy Rollins

=== 2017 personalities ===
==== Play-by-play ====
- Ernie Johnson
- Brian Anderson
- Don Orsillo – select regular season games

==== Color commentators ====
- Ron Darling
- Dennis Eckersley – select regular season games and MLB playoffs
- Joe Simpson – MLB playoffs only

==== Field reporters ====
- Sam Ryan
- Lauren Shehadi

==== Studio host ====
- Casey Stern

==== Studio analysts ====
- Gary Sheffield
- Pedro Martínez
- Jimmy Rollins

=== 2018 personalities ===
==== Play-by-play ====
- Brian Anderson
- Don Orsillo – Don Orsillo replaced Johnson on TBS' 2018 ALDS coverage after Johnson announced that he would not cover the Major League Baseball playoffs as a result of his treatment for the blood clots in both of his legs.
- Ernie Johnson

==== Color commentators ====
- Ron Darling
- Dennis Eckersley – select regular season games and MLB playoffs

==== Field reporters ====
- Lauren Shehadi
- Hazel Mae

==== Studio host ====
- Casey Stern

==== Studio analysts ====
- Gary Sheffield
- Pedro Martínez
- Jimmy Rollins

=== 2019 personalities ===
==== Play-by-play ====
- Brian Anderson
- Don Orsillo – select regular season games
- Ernie Johnson

==== Color commentators ====
- Ron Darling
- Pedro Martínez – select regular season games
- Jeff Francoeur – MLB playoffs only

==== Field reporters ====
- Lauren Shehadi
- Alex Chappell
- Emily Jones – pre- and post-game show – (2019 NLDS)
- Hazel Mae – pre- and post-game show – (2019 NLDS)

==== Studio host ====
- Casey Stern

==== Studio analysts ====
- Gary Sheffield
- Pedro Martínez
- Jimmy Rollins – color commentator for select regular season games
- Curtis Granderson – NLCS only

== 2020s ==
=== 2020 personalities ===
==== Play-by-play ====
- Brian Anderson – Division Series and Championship Series playoffs
- Don Orsillo – Division Series playoffs
- Rich Waltz – select regular season games and Wild Card series
- Ernie Johnson – select regular season games
- Joe Simpson – most regular season games

==== Color commentators ====
- Ron Darling – most regular season games, Division Series, and Championship Series playoffs
- Jeff Francoeur – Division Series and Championship Series playoffs
- Jimmy Rollins – select regular season games and Wild Card series
- Joe Simpson – select regular season games

==== Field reporters ====
- Lauren Shehadi
- Matt Winer

==== Studio host ====
- Ernie Johnson

==== Studio analysts ====
- Jimmy Rollins
- Pedro Martínez
- Curtis Granderson

=== 2021 personalities ===
==== Play-by-play ====
- Brian Anderson – most regular season games, Wild Card series, Division Series and Championship Series playoffs
- Don Orsillo – select regular season games and Division Series playoffs
- Matt Winer – select regular season games

==== Color commentators ====
- Ron Darling – most regular season games, Wild Card series, Division Series, and Championship Series playoffs
- Jeff Francoeur – Division Series and Championship Series playoffs and select regular season games.
- Jimmy Rollins – select regular season games

==== Field reporters ====
- Lauren Shehadi
- Matt Winer
- Alanna Rizzo – pre- and post-game show, 2021 ALDS and 2021 ALCS
- Hazel Mae – pre- and post-game show, 2021 ALDS

==== Studio hosts ====
- Ernie Johnson – Wild Card Game and NLDS
- Bob Costas – NLCS

==== Studio analysts ====
- Jimmy Rollins
- Pedro Martínez
- Curtis Granderson – analyst for select regular season games

=== 2022 personalities ===
==== Play-by-play ====
- Brian Anderson
- Bob Costas
- Don Orsillo – Select regular season games

==== Color commentators ====
- Ron Darling
- Jeff Francoeur

==== Field reporters ====
- Lauren Shehadi – occasional regular season games and MLB Playoffs
- Matt Winer – most regular season games and 2022 ALDS
- Heidi Watney
- Kelly Crull – occasional regular season games
- Allie LaForce – most regular season games
- Hazel Mae – occasional regular season games
- Jahmai Webster
- Meredith Marakovits

==== Studio hosts ====
- Ernie Johnson
- Lauren Shehadi
- Bob Costas – ALCS

==== Studio analysts ====
- Jimmy Rollins
- Pedro Martínez
- Curtis Granderson
- Matt Holliday – select weeks during regular season
- Chase Utley – select weeks during regular season
- Dexter Fowler – select weeks during regular season

=== 2023 personalities ===
==== Play-by-play ====
- Brian Anderson
- Bob Costas
- Don Orsillo – Select regular season games

==== Color commentators ====
- Ron Darling
- Jeff Francoeur
- Curtis Granderson – select regular season games

==== Field reporters ====
- Lauren Shehadi
- Matt Winer

==== Studio hosts ====
- Ernie Johnson
- Lauren Shehadi

==== Studio analysts ====
- Jimmy Rollins
- Pedro Martínez
- Curtis Granderson

=== 2024 personalities ===
==== Play-by-play ====
- Brian Anderson
- Bob Costas
- Alex Faust - select regular season games
- Don Orsillo – select regular season games

==== Color commentators ====
- Ron Darling
- Jeff Francoeur
- Curtis Granderson – select regular season games

==== Field reporters ====
- Lauren Jbara
- Jon Morosi

==== Studio hosts ====
- Lauren Shehadi
- Greg Amsinger – second half of the regular season

==== Studio analysts ====
- Jimmy Rollins
- Pedro Martínez
- Curtis Granderson
- Dusty Baker – MLB postseason

=== 2025 personalities ===
==== Play-by-play ====
- Brian Anderson
- Alex Faust
- Tom McCarthy – select regular season games
- Don Orsillo – select regular season games
- Brandon Gaudin – select regular season games

==== Color commentators ====
- Ron Darling
- Jeff Francoeur
- Curtis Granderson - select regular season games
- Jimmy Rollins - select regular season games

==== Field reporters ====
- Lauren Shehadi
- Lauren Jbara

==== Studio hosts ====
- Lauren Shehadi
- Alanna Rizzo
- Adam Lefkoe
- Meredith Marakovits

==== Studio analysts ====
- Jimmy Rollins
- Pedro Martínez
- Curtis Granderson

=== 2026 personalities ===
==== Play-by-play ====
- Brian Anderson
- Alex Faust
- Brandon Gaudin – select regular season games
- Brendan Burke – select regular season games

==== Color commentators ====
- Ron Darling
- Jeff Francoeur

==== Studio hosts ====
- Lauren Shehadi
- Adam Lefkoe
- Meredith Marakovits - select weeks during regular season

==== Studio analysts ====
- Jimmy Rollins
- Pedro Martínez
- Curtis Granderson
- Jake Peavy – select weeks during regular season

== Postseason announcing teams ==
Major League Baseball on TBS announcing teams
Season	Event	Play-by-play	Color commentator(s)	Field reporter(s)	LDS	LCS
2007	2007 MLB Postseason	Chip Caray	Tony Gwynn and Bob Brenly	Craig Sager	Cleveland vs. New York	NLCS: Arizona vs. Colorado
2007	2007 MLB Postseason	Dick Stockton	Ron Darling	Marc Fein	Arizona vs. Chicago	
2007	2007 MLB Postseason	Ted Robinson	Steve Stone	José Mota	Boston vs. Los Angeles	
2007	2007 MLB Postseason	Don Orsillo	Joe Simpson	David Aldridge	Philadelphia vs. Colorado	
2008	2008 MLB Postseason	Chip Caray	Buck Martinez (Entire series and ALCS)	Craig Sager	Los Angeles vs. Boston	ALCS: Tampa Bay vs. Boston
2008	2008 MLB Postseason	Chip Caray	Ron Darling (Game 4 and entire ALCS)	Craig Sager	Los Angeles vs. Boston	ALCS: Tampa Bay vs. Boston
2008	2008 MLB Postseason	Dick Stockton	Ron Darling and Tony Gwynn	Tom Verducci	Chicago vs. Los Angeles	
2008	2008 MLB Postseason	Don Orsillo	Harold Reynolds	Marc Fein	Tampa Bay vs. Chicago	
2008	2008 MLB Postseason	Brian Anderson	Joe Simpson and John Smoltz	David Aldridge	Philadelphia vs. Milwaukee	
2009	2009 MLB Postseason	Chip Caray	Ron Darling (Entire series and NLCS)	Craig Sager	New York vs. Minnesota	NLCS: Los Angeles vs. Philadelphia
2009	2009 MLB Postseason	Chip Caray	Buck Martinez (Entire NLCS)	Craig Sager	New York vs. Minnesota	NLCS: Los Angeles vs. Philadelphia
2009	2009 MLB Postseason	Don Orsillo	Buck Martinez	Marc Fein	Los Angeles vs. Boston	
2009	2009 MLB Postseason	Dick Stockton	Bob Brenly	Tom Verducci	Los Angeles vs. St. Louis	
2009	2009 MLB Postseason	Brian Anderson	Joe Simpson	David Aldridge	Philadelphia vs. Colorado	
2010	2010 MLB Postseason	Ernie Johnson	Ron Darling and John Smoltz	Craig Sager	Minnesota vs. New York	ALCS: Texas vs. New York
2010	2010 MLB Postseason	Brian Anderson	Joe Simpson	David Aldridge	Philadelphia vs. Cincinnati	
2010	2010 MLB Postseason	Dick Stockton	Bob Brenly	Tom Verducci	San Francisco vs. Atlanta	
2010	2010 MLB Postseason	Don Orsillo	Buck Martinez (Entire Series)	Marc Fein	Tampa Bay vs. Texas	
2010	2010 MLB Postseason	Don Orsillo	Ron Darling (Game 5)	Marc Fein	Tampa Bay vs. Texas	
2011	2011 MLB Postseason	Brian Anderson	Ron Darling and John Smoltz	Tom Verducci (ALDS)	New York vs. Detroit	NLCS: Milwaukee vs. St. Louis
2011	2011 MLB Postseason	Brian Anderson	Ron Darling and John Smoltz	Craig Sager (NLCS)	New York vs. Detroit	NLCS: Milwaukee vs. St. Louis
2011	2011 MLB Postseason	Dick Stockton	Bob Brenly (Games 1–4)	Craig Sager	Philadelphia vs. St. Louis	
2011	2011 MLB Postseason	Dick Stockton	Ron Darling and John Smoltz (Game 5)	Craig Sager	Philadelphia vs. St. Louis	
2011	2011 MLB Postseason	Don Orsillo	Buck Martinez	Jaime Maggio	Texas vs. Tampa Bay	
2011	2011 MLB Postseason	Victor Rojas	Joe Simpson	Sam Ryan	Milwaukee vs. Arizona	
2012	2012 MLB Postseason	Ernie Johnson	John Smoltz and Cal Ripken (Wild Card Game and ALDS)	Craig Sager	New York vs. Baltimore	ALCS: New York vs. Detroit
2012	2012 MLB Postseason	Ernie Johnson	Ron Darling and John Smoltz (ALCS)	Craig Sager	New York vs. Baltimore	ALCS: New York vs. Detroit
2012	2012 MLB Postseason	Brian Anderson	Ron Darling and Joe Simpson	Tom Verducci	Cincinnati vs. San Francisco	
2012	2012 MLB Postseason	Dick Stockton	Bob Brenly	David Aldridge	Washington vs. St. Louis	
2012	2012 MLB Postseason	Don Orsillo	Buck Martinez	Jaime Maggio	Oakland vs. Detroit	
2013	2013 MLB Postseason	Ernie Johnson	Ron Darling and Cal Ripken	Craig Sager	Atlanta vs. Los Angeles	NLCS: St. Louis vs. Los Angeles
2013	2013 MLB Postseason	Brian Anderson	John Smoltz and Joe Simpson	Rachel Nichols	Boston vs. Tampa Bay	
2013	2013 MLB Postseason	Dick Stockton	Bob Brenly	Matt Winer	St. Louis vs. Pittsburgh	
2013	2013 MLB Postseason	Don Orsillo	Dennis Eckersley and Buck Martinez	David Aldridge	Oakland vs. Detroit	
2014	2014 AL Postseason	Ernie Johnson	Ron Darling and Cal Ripken	Matt Winer	Los Angeles vs. Kansas City	ALCS: Baltimore vs. Kansas City
2014	2014 AL Postseason	Brian Anderson	Dennis Eckersley and Joe Simpson	Jaime Maggio	Baltimore vs. Detroit	
2015	2015 NL Postseason	Ernie Johnson	Ron Darling and Cal Ripken	Matt Winer (Wild Card Game and NLCS)	Los Angeles vs. New York	NLCS: New York vs. Chicago
2015	2015 NL Postseason	Ernie Johnson	Ron Darling and Cal Ripken	Sam Ryan (NLDS and NLCS)	Los Angeles vs. New York	NLCS: New York vs. Chicago
2015	2015 NL Postseason	Brian Anderson	Dennis Eckersley and Joe Simpson	Matt Winer	St. Louis vs. Chicago	
2016	2016 AL Postseason	Ernie Johnson	Ron Darling and Cal Ripken	Sam Ryan	Cleveland vs. Boston	ALCS: Cleveland vs. Toronto
2016	2016 AL Postseason	Brian Anderson	Dennis Eckersley and Joe Simpson	Matt Winer	Texas vs. Toronto	
2017	2017 NL Postseason	Ernie Johnson (Wild Card Game and NLDS)	Ron Darling	Sam Ryan	Washington vs. Chicago	NLCS: Los Angeles vs. Chicago
2017	2017 NL Postseason	Brian Anderson (NLCS)	Ron Darling	Sam Ryan	Washington vs. Chicago	NLCS: Los Angeles vs. Chicago
2017	2017 NL Postseason	Brian Anderson	Dennis Eckersley and Joe Simpson	Lauren Shehadi	Los Angeles vs. Arizona	
2018	2018 AL Postseason	Brian Anderson	Ron Darling and Dennis Eckersley (Wild Card Game)	Lauren Shehadi	Boston vs. New York	ALCS: Boston vs. Houston
2018	2018 AL Postseason	Brian Anderson	Ron Darling (ALDS and ALCS)	Lauren Shehadi	Boston vs. New York	ALCS: Boston vs. Houston
2018	2018 AL Postseason	Don Orsillo	Dennis Eckersley	Hazel Mae	Houston vs. Cleveland	
2019	2019 NL Postseason	Ernie Johnson (Wild Card Game)	Ron Darling and Jeff Francoeur (Wild Card Game and NLCS)	Lauren Shehadi	Atlanta vs. St. Louis	NLCS: St. Louis vs. Washington
2019	2019 NL Postseason	Brian Anderson (NLDS and NLCS)	Ron Darling (NLDS)	Lauren Shehadi	Atlanta vs. St. Louis	NLCS: St. Louis vs. Washington
2019	2019 NL Postseason	Ernie Johnson	Jeff Francoeur	Alex Chappell	Los Angeles vs. Washington	
2020	2020 AL Postseason	Brian Anderson	Ron Darling (ALDS)	Lauren Shehadi	Tampa Bay vs. New York	ALCS: Tampa Bay vs. Houston
2020	2020 AL Postseason	Brian Anderson	Ron Darling and Jeff Francoeur (ALCS)	Lauren Shehadi	Tampa Bay vs. New York	ALCS: Tampa Bay vs. Houston
2020	2020 AL Postseason	Don Orsillo	Jeff Francoeur	Matt Winer	Oakland vs. Houston	
2020	2020 AL Postseason	Rich Waltz	Jimmy Rollins	N/A	Tampa Bay vs. Toronto (Wild Card)	
2021	2021 NL Postseason	Brian Anderson	Ron Darling (Wild Card and NLDS)	Lauren Shehadi	San Francisco vs. Los Angeles	NLCS: Atlanta vs. Los Angeles
2021	2021 NL Postseason	Brian Anderson	Ron Darling and Jeff Francoeur (NLCS)	Lauren Shehadi	San Francisco vs. Los Angeles	NLCS: Atlanta vs. Los Angeles
2021	2021 NL Postseason	Don Orsillo	Jeff Francoeur	Matt Winer	Milwaukee vs. Atlanta	
2022	2022 AL Postseason	Brian Anderson	Jeff Francoeur (ALDS)	Matt Winer (ALDS)	Houston vs. Seattle	ALCS: Houston vs. New York
2022	2022 AL Postseason	Brian Anderson	Ron Darling and Jeff Francoeur (ALCS)	Lauren Shehadi (ALCS)	Houston vs. Seattle	ALCS: Houston vs. New York
2022	2022 AL Postseason	Bob Costas	Ron Darling	Lauren Shehadi	New York vs. Cleveland	
2023	2023 NL Postseason	Brian Anderson	Jeff Francoeur (NLDS)	Matt Winer	Atlanta vs. Philadelphia	NLCS: Philadelphia vs. Arizona
2023	2023 NL Postseason	Brian Anderson	Ron Darling and Jeff Francoeur (NLCS)	Matt Winer	Atlanta vs. Philadelphia	NLCS: Philadelphia vs. Arizona
2023	2023 NL Postseason	Bob Costas	Ron Darling	Lauren Shehadi	Los Angeles vs. Arizona	
2024	2024 AL Postseason	Brian Anderson	Jeff Francoeur (ALDS)	Lauren Jbara	Cleveland vs. Detroit	ALCS: New York vs. Cleveland
2024	2024 AL Postseason	Brian Anderson	Ron Darling and Jeff Francoeur (ALCS)	Lauren Jbara	Cleveland vs. Detroit	ALCS: New York vs. Cleveland
2024	2024 AL Postseason	Bob Costas	Ron Darling	Jon Morosi	New York vs. Kansas City	
2025	2025 NL Postseason	Brian Anderson	Jeff Francoeur (NLDS)	Lauren Shehadi	Philadelphia vs. Los Angeles	NLCS: Milwaukee vs. Los Angeles
2025	2025 NL Postseason	Brian Anderson	Ron Darling and Jeff Francoeur (NLCS)	Lauren Shehadi	Philadelphia vs. Los Angeles	NLCS: Milwaukee vs. Los Angeles
2025	2025 NL Postseason	Alex Faust	Ron Darling	Lauren Jbara	Milwaukee vs. Chicago	
2026	2026 AL Postseason	Brian Anderson	Jeff Francoeur (ALDS)	Lauren Shehadi	Tampa Bay vs. New York	ALCS: Tampa Bay vs. Cleveland
2026	2026 AL Postseason	Brian Anderson	Ron Darling and Jeff Francoeur (ALCS)	Lauren Shehadi	Tampa Bay vs. New York	ALCS: Tampa Bay vs. Cleveland
2026	2026 AL Postseason	Alex Faust	Ron Darling	Lauren Jbara	Cleveland vs. Chicago	

In 2007, Don Orsillo and Joe Simpson called the one game playoff between the Colorado Rockies and the San Diego Padres to decide the National League wild card. In 2008, Dick Stockton called the American Central tiebreaker game between the Chicago White Sox and Minnesota Twins with Ron Darling, Harold Reynolds and field reporter Marc Fein. In 2009, Chip Caray, Ron Darling, and field reporter Craig Sager called the one game playoff between the Minnesota Twins and Detroit Tigers for the American League Central title. In 2022, Matt Winer filled in for Lauren Shehadi in Game 5 of the American League Division Series between the Cleveland Guardians and the New York Yankees so Shehadi could host coverage for it instead of Ernie Johnson after its postponement conflicted with the latter's NBA on TNT opening night duties.
