= NBA Gametime Live =

- Country of origin: United States
- No. of episodes: N/A

Production
- Production location: Atlanta, Georgia
- Running time: varied

Original release
- Network: NBA TV
- Release: October 30, 2008 – October 1, 2025

Related
- The Association

NBA Gametime was the flagship program of NBA TV. The show began airing on October 30, 2008. The show concluded on October 1, 2025, during TNT Sports ceasing its content production for the channel. TNT Sports and the NBA could not agree on a new path forward for the management of NBA TV. The show "NBA Gametime Live" was replaced by a new flagship program called "The Association".

== Background ==
The show has a studio host and various studio analysts. It airs live and provides the viewer live look-ins at NBA games, during which it shows a team's actual broadcast while providing analysis, interviews, and breaking news. The show airs live six days a week at different times and lengths, not airing on Thursdays due to the NBA's commitment to The NBA on TNT. The postgame edition, exclusive to NBA Playoffs coverage, airs daily and covers all playoff games. During TNT's playoff coverage, Gametime Live: Postgame airs around the same time as Inside the NBA. During the offseason, Gametime airs on a semi-daily basis, mostly to give results of WNBA and NBA Summer League games, report offseason transactions, and provide latest news on USA Basketball, Olympic basketball and FIBA competitions.

== Format ==
The show airs "live look-ins" throughout the night, in which they air some footage of a game currently airing on local broadcasts. The only games NBA TV is not allowed to look in are games broadcast by ESPN and ABC. The studio team also provides analysis on any sort of news, or questions provided by the fans. After some of the games, the crew interviews players on winning teams. The crew also sometimes has phone interviews with former players of the game.

An edited one hour/thirty minute version of the broadcast is repeated throughout the late night/early morning hours.

== Tuesday Fan Night / Players Only ==
On Tuesday broadcasts, the channel will air either a single or double-header, as listed on the NBA's official website. Ernie Johnson, Kevin McHale, Greg Anthony and Chris Webber, along with a rotating host/analysts should one or none of the regulars appear due to other obligations, provide the analysis, pre-game, halftime and postgame, which ever games are shown on the air. After every game, the crew will interview a player via satellite (video call). In addition, fans can interact with the host and analysts via Twitter and also can caption a picture that's shown on the air. The best captions by Twitter or Facebook users will be displayed in between breaks for the game(s) that's shown. Fans also have the opportunity to win two tickets to an upcoming game of their choice, in which a question is posted on the official NBA TV Twitter account, shown during the pre-game show. The winner, chosen at random if they have the correct answer, is announced at the end of the halftime show (although sometimes the winner is announced on NBA TV's Twitter page, before halftime) with the correct answer displayed.

On October 24, 2017, the channel replaced Fan Night with Players Only. Making its debut on TNT in February 2017, it shows live games on NBA TV every Tuesday. Webber hosts, while Thomas & McHale give analysis of the games that are shown on the air that night. Play-by-Play is done by Greg Anthony, with Steve Smith doing color commentary. Dennis Scott does sideline reporting at the game's site. The hosts and analysts encourage fans to tweet and ask questions to the crew during the games that are shown on the air. They even answer some fan questions while the games are in progress and the analysts will give their takes on the questions that are being asked. In addition, some fans get to interact with the crew at the end of the night, via Skype or FaceTime, where they can comment or ask any question they want to the hosts and analysts. At the end of each game, a random viewer is chosen to win a customized game ball for the player of the game.

On July 24, 2019, it was announced that TNT would no longer air games or content under the Players Only branding starting in the 2019-2020 NBA Season.

== Personalities ==
The studio host and analysts of NBA Gametime vary every night.

=== Final Studio hosts ===
- Jared Greenberg (2011–2025)
- Rick Kamla (2008–2025)
- Allie LaForce (2018–2025)
- Kristen Ledlow (2016–2025)
- Chris Miles (2017–2025)
- Casey Stern (2015–2025)
- Chris Webber (2017–2019); Only on Monday nights for Players Only
- Matt Winer (2009–2025)

=== Final Studio analysts ===
- Greg Anthony (2010–2025); play-by-play (Players Only) (2017–2019)
- Candace Parker (2018–2025); Studio Analyst (Players Only) (2018–2019)
- Vinny Del Negro (2013–2025)
- Mike Fratello (2008–2025)
- David Griffin (2017–2025)
- Brendan Haywood (2016–2025)
- Grant Hill (2016–2025)
- Stu Jackson (2016–2025)
- Kevin McHale (2009–2011; 2016–2025)
- Shaquille O'Neal (2011–2025)
- Tom Penn (2018–2025)
- Dennis Scott (2009–2025; Sideline reporter (Players Only) 2017–2019)
- Kenny Smith (2008–2025)
- Steve Smith (2008–2025); Color Commentator (Players Only) 2017–2019)
- Isiah Thomas (2012–2025); Studio Analyst (Players Only) (2017–2019)

=== Guest Analysts ===
- Tony Delk
- Mike Dunleavy
- Danny Granger
- Jarvis Hayes
- Lionel Hollins
- Milt Newton
- Jason Terry

=== Former hosts and analysts ===
- Andre Aldridge (2008–2009)
- David Aldridge (2008–2018)
- Brent Barry (2009–2018, now with Prime Video analysts)
- Caron Butler (2016–2017)
- Vince Cellini (2010–2017)
- Derrick Coleman (2009)
- Antonio Davis (2008–2012)
- LaPhonso Ellis (2009)
- Marc Fein (2008–2011)
- Rick Fox (2010–2017)
- Lawrence Frank (2010)
- Matt Harpring (2010)
- Lionel Hollins (2013)
- Ernie Johnson (2008–2017)
- Eddie Jordan (2008–2009)
- Tracy McGrady (2013)
- Sam Mitchell (2008–2010; 2013–2015, 2016–2018)
- Kyle Montgomery (2009–2013)
- Gary Payton (2008–2009, 2020)
- Scot Pollard (2009–2014)
- Byron Scott (2013)
- Eric Snow (2008–2010)
- Jerry Stackhouse (2010–2016)
- Reggie Theus (2008–2009)
- Syleys Roberts (2012–2015)
