= Casey Stern =

American television personality

- Born: October 17, 1978 (age 48); Massapequa, New York, U.S.
- Occupations: Television and radio sports broadcaster
- Years active: 2000–present
- Employer: Turner Sports
- Known for: Sports anchor on CNN's Sports Tonight, and anchor for NBA TV and Sirius XM Radio
- Children: 3

Casey Stern (born October 17, 1978, in Massapequa, New York) is an American television personality and radio host who currently works for Turner Sports and Sirius XM Radio.

== Career ==
Stern departed MLB.com's BaseballChannel.tv, formerly MLB Radio where he was most recently host of the Fantasy 411. On April 28, 2006, he began hosting a half-hour television show on the Baseball Channel on MLB.com called MLB.com Midday. Stern hosted "State of the RedSox.com Nation" on the Redsox.com until November 7. Peter McCarthy now hosts "State of the RedSox.com Nation". McCarthy took over from Stern on Under the Lights. He also used to host Under the Lights on MLB Radio but left in November 2005 to pursue video at MLB.com.

Stern is also a die-hard New York Mets fan and hosted "Next Stop Shea" on Mets.com. Stern hosted The Bottom Line on the Baseball Channel which took over from Stayin' Hot with Seth and Bone when Darryl Hamilton left to work for MLB. He previously co-hosted the Fantasy 411 on the Baseball Channel with longtime hosts, Mike Siano and Cory Schwartz.

== Turner Sports ==
During the October 17, 2015 TBS postgame coverage of Game 1 of the NLCS, Stern issued an on-air apology for the apparent use of profanity when sending the broadcast to commercial. He took full responsibility for the "hot mic" incident and apologized to anybody he offended.

On March 31 and December 15, 2016, he hosted TNT's pregame and postshow NBA coverage, including Inside the NBA, substituting for Ernie Johnson. He hosted the show of December 15, filling in for Johnson because of a family illness, on a day that was devoted to the death of sideline reporter Craig Sager.

On August 26, 2016, Turner Sports reached a multi-year agreement with Stern to join Turner as a studio host for the MLB on TBS and the NBA on TNT, as well as NCAA March Madness, replacing colleague Matt Winer. Stern was later removed from March Madness for the 2020 NCAA tournament, which was canceled due to the COVID-19 outbreak, as he was to be replaced by CBS's Adam Zucker.

== Personal life ==
Stern grew up in Massapequa and spent 13 years, as an adult, living in Seaford.
