= NCAA March Madness (TV program) =

Broadcasts of the NCAA men's basketball tournament by CBS Sports and TNT Sports

- Logo used since the 2018 tournament
- Genre: College basketball telecasts
- Opening theme: "CBS College Basketball Theme" (main theme, 2011–present)
- Country of origin: United States
- Original language: English
- No. of seasons: 13

Production
- Production locations: Various NCAA tournament sites (game telecasts); Studio 43, CBS Broadcast Center, New York City; Studio D, Techwood Studios, Atlanta, Georgia (pregame and postgame shows)
- Camera setup: Multi-camera
- Running time: 120 minutes and until game ends
- Production companies: CBS Sports; TNT Sports; National Collegiate Athletic Association

Original release
- Network: CBS; TBS; TNT; truTV; Paramount+; HBO Max
- Release: March 15, 2011 – present

Related
- College Basketball on CBS Sports; College Basketball on TNT Sports

NCAA March Madness is the branding used for coverage of the NCAA Division I men's basketball tournament that is jointly produced by CBS Sports and TNT Sports. Through the agreement, which began with the 2011 tournament, games are televised across the broadcast network CBS and the cable channels TNT, TBS and truTV. All games are also streamed on Paramount+ or HBO Max, as well as the March Madness Live app and website with TV Everywhere authentication.

Initially, CBS continued to provide coverage during most rounds, while TNT, TBS, and truTV covered much of the early rounds up to the Second Round (with truTV covering the First Four and CBS/TBS airing the Sweet Sixteen and Elite Eight). Starting in 2016, the Final Four and national championship game began to alternate between CBS and TBS. TBS holds the rights to the final two rounds in even-numbered years, with CBS getting the games in odd-numbered years.

This joint tournament coverage is distinct from CBS and TNT Sports' regular-season coverage, which are produced independently through their sports divisions. March Madness games broadcast on all four networks use a variation of the longtime CBS College Basketball theme (which has been used since 1993) music composed by Bob Christianson.

== Background and coverage breakdown ==
Logo used until 2018.

On April 22, 2010, the National Collegiate Athletic Association (NCAA) reached a 14-year agreement, worth US$10.8 billion, with CBS and the Turner Broadcasting System to receive joint broadcast rights to the Division I men's college basketball tournament. This came after speculation that ESPN would try to obtain the rights to future tournament games. The NCAA took advantage of an opt-out clause in its 1999 deal with CBS (which ran through 2013, even though the NCAA had the option of ending the agreement after the 2010 championship) to announce its intention to sign a new contract with CBS and Turner Sports, a division of WarnerMedia, which later was absorbed into Warner Bros. Discovery. The new contract came amid serious consideration by the NCAA of expanding the tournament to 68 teams.

The agreement, which runs through 2032 (extended from 2024 in 2016), stipulates that all games are available nationally. All First Four games air on truTV. During the first and second rounds, a featured game in each time "window" is broadcast terrestrially on CBS (15 games), while all other games are shown on TBS (12 games), TNT (12 games) or truTV (nine games). Sweet 16 (regional semifinal) and Elite 8 (regional finals) games are split between CBS and TBS. In 2014 and 2015, Turner channels had exclusive rights to the Final Four (with standard coverage airing on TBS), and CBS broadcast the championship game. Since 2016, rights to the Final Four and championship game alternate between Turner and CBS; the 2016 tournament marked the first time that the national championship game was not broadcast on over-the-air television.

The same number of "windows" are provided to CBS as before, although unlike with the previous schedule where all games in a window started within 10 minutes of each other, resulting in the possibility of multiple close games ending at once, the start times of games are staggered, with action lasting later in the night and fewer simultaneous games than in the previous format. As a result of the new deal, Mega March Madness, a pay-per-view out-of-market sports package covering games in the tournament exclusive to DirecTV, including a first and second round 'quad-box' channel showing all four games on one screen, was discontinued.

March Madness On Demand (now called March Madness Live) remained unchanged, with Turner Interactive taking over management of both that service and NCAA.com at the start of 2011. The contract was expected to be signed after a review by the NCAA Board of Directors. In 2012, the service was changed; only games televised by CBS are available for free. All other games are available to authenticated subscribers to the channels on participating television providers. The 2018 tournament, with TBS televising the national semifinals and final, is the first in which those particular games are subject to authentication restrictions. In 2018, March Madness Live added a new "whiparound" stream during the early rounds known as Fast Break (similar in concept to NFL RedZone and ESPN Buzzer Beater), which features live look-ins, analysis, and highlights of simultaneous games.

The CBS-WarnerMedia coverage formally begins with The Selection Show—in which the teams participating in the tournament are announced, which follows CBS's coverage of the final game on Selection Sunday. During the tournament itself, truTV broadcasts pre-game coverage, Infiniti NCAA Tip-Off, while TBS and TruTV also air the post-game show Inside March Madness. CBS also produces coverage of the Reese's College All-Star Game (held on the afternoon of the Final Four at its venue), and the Division II championship game, which are both aired as part of the March Madness package.

In 2016, CBS extended the selection show to a two-hour format; however, the new special was criticized by viewers for being too padded, while the full bracket was leaked online shortly into the broadcast. In 2017, the selection show was shortened to a 90-minute format, promising to reveal the bracket in a more timely manner. In 2018, the selection show aired for the first time on TBS, with a studio audience and in a two-hour format, in which the entire field of the tournament would be revealed within the first 10 minutes. However, this involved initially revealing the teams in alphabetical order, and not the bracket proper—a decision which proved unpopular among critics and viewers. The show returned to an hour-long format on CBS the following year, and the 2020 edition was also expected to air on CBS.

On April 16, 2016, the contract was extended to 2032 in an $8.8 billion deal. The current broadcasting arrangements, including alternating broadcasts of the semi-finals and final, will remain in force.

WarnerMedia began the process of dissolving the Turner Broadcasting System in March 2019. The corporate reorganization will not outwardly affect coverage of NCAA March Madness, which remains on the same networks.

The 2020 tournament was cancelled due to the COVID-19 pandemic in the United States. All technicians and utility staff who were expected to work the tournament were still paid, while CBS aired classic Final Four games on the afternoons of March 21, 22 and 29 as replacement programming. The NCAA has yet to announce if the contract will be extended an additional year to 2033 to compensate for the loss of the 2020 tournament.

The addition of NHL coverage affected coverage during the 2022 First Four on March 16. When the game between the Boston Bruins and the Minnesota Wild ran long, neither TBS (due to AEW Dynamite) nor truTV (due to continuing coverage of the Rutgers-Notre Dame First Four game) were available for the start of the Tampa Bay Lightning-Seattle Kraken NHL game. The start of the hockey game was moved to a fourth channel, HLN.

In 2024, Max made all non-CBS tournament games available to stream under its B/R Sports label. Additionally, in addition to the Final Four and National Championship Game, truTV began simulcasting games aired on TBS from the second round on.

=== Team Streams ===
Additionally, for 2014, truTV and TNT aired special "Teamcast" coverage of the Final Four alongside TBS's conventional coverage, which featured commentators and other guests representing the schools in each game. While the consortium planned to tap local radio announcers from each team for the teamcasts, the majority refused due to commitments in calling the games for their local radio networks. However, Turner Sports' senior vice president of production, Craig Barry, did expect such difficulties, and planned accordingly with the possibility of using talent from outlets associated with the team, general region, or their conference (such as regional networks). The Teamcast feeds returned for the 2015 tournament, now branded as Team Stream powered by Bleacher Report. For 2016, they were also used on the National Championship game.

Among the contributors to the team streams in 2018 were physician and medical analyst Sanjay Gupta (Michigan) and actor/comedian (and former contributor to Fox NFL Sunday) Rob Riggle (Kansas).

As CBS prefers having a singular broadcast feed, the Team Stream feature is not used during any year that CBS holds the rights to the Final Four.

The Team Stream broadcasts were quietly discontinued following the cancellation of the 2020 tournament; beginning with the 2022 tournament, truTV and TNT instead do a straight simulcast of the Final Four using the TBS network feed.

=== International coverage ===
The same year that the CBS-Turner consortium took over, ESPN International acquired rights to the tournament for broadcast outside of the United States as part of a $500 million agreement with ESPN to hold the rights to most other NCAA Division I championships.

While most of the coverage is simulcast from the main U.S. feeds, coverage of the Final Four and national championship game uses a separate world feed produced by the ESPN College Basketball staff; in 2013, the Final Four broadcasts on ESPN International were called by ESPN's lead commentators Dan Shulman and Dick Vitale (alternatively joined by Brad Nessler for the second semi-final game). After Nessler left ESPN, Sean McDonough became the primary play-by-play host, joined by ESPN college basketball analysts Jay Bilas and Vitale.

TUDN broadcasts the tournament in Mexico; CBS and Turner Sports also feature Spanish play-by-play in the United States via each network's second audio program.

== Commentary ==
CBS and TNT pool their resources for the tournament. On the play-by-play front, CBS provides Ian Eagle, Kevin Harlan, Andrew Catalon, Brad Nessler, Spero Dedes (who is also employed by TNT), Tom McCarthy, and Jordan Kent, while TNT provides Brian Anderson and Brandon Gaudin (who also works for Fox Sports and NBC Sports).

Analysts include CBS's Bill Raftery (who like Gaudin, also works for Fox), Robbie Hummel (also employed by TNT, Fox and NBC), Steve Lappas, Wally Szczerbiak, Jim Spanarkel, and Dan Bonner, TNT's Grant Hill (also a CBS and NBC employee, Jim Jackson (also a Fox employee), Stan Van Gundy, Chris Webber, and Candace Parker.

CBS and TNT's reporter pool includes Tracy Wolfson, Evan Washburn, Jon Rothstein, AJ Ross, and Jenny Dell from the former, and Allie LaForce, Lauren Shehadi, Jared Greenberg, and Andy Katz from the latter.

Former announcers pooled by CBS and TNT include Jim Nantz, who was the lead voice for the tournament until 2023, Verne Lundquist, former lead NBA on TNT voice Marv Albert, current Golden State Warriors head coach Steve Kerr, and former Indiana Pacers player Reggie Miller.

Studio coverage originates from the CBS Broadcast Center in New York City, and the TNT Sports studio in Atlanta, where many of the studio shows for the latter division's college basketball, as well as coverage of MLB, and the NHL emanate from.

CBS's lead college basketball host Adam Zucker splits hosting duties in New York with The NFL Today analyst and CBS Mornings host Nate Burleson. They are joined by colleagues Clark Kellogg and Renee Montgomery and Inside the NBA analysts Kenny Smith and Charles Barkley. TNT's Adam Lefkoe meanwhile, hosts from Atlanta alongside CBS's Seth Davis (who also appears on TNT broadcasts), and TNT's Jalen Rose, Jamal Mashburn, and former Auburn head coach Bruce Pearl. CBS's Gene Steratore provides rules analysis throughout the tournament, while NFL Network's Jamie Erdahl provides game updates from the first round through the Sweet 16.

Prior to 2021, and again in 2023, Inside the NBA host Ernie Johnson had split hosting duties with Greg Gumbel in New York until 2024, when Gumbel missed that year's tournament due to family health issues. Gumbel later died on December 27, 2024. Johnson then split hosting duties with Zucker, who had provided in-game studio updates in previous years, for the 2024 and 2025 tournaments. Additionally, former Villanova head coach Jay Wright was also part of coverage until 2025, primarily working with the Atlanta studio crew. He would then join the New York studio beginning with the Elite 8. Other notable former studio hosts include Matt Winer, Casey Stern, and Nabil Karim.

After Nantz's retirement calling the NCAA Tournament in 2023, Eagle replaced Nantz as the lead voice of the tournament beginning in 2024, while Johnson became host of the trophy presentation.

Following the 2024–25 NBA season, Inside the NBA began airing on ESPN, although TNT Sports still produces the program from its Atlanta base. Despite the change, Johnson, Barkley, and Smith would still contribute to March Madness coverage, with Johnson instead only hosting the Final Four and National Championship Game.

== Graphics ==
=== 2011–2015 ===
During the first five years of the television deal, all games used Turner Sports graphics, which reflect from Turner Sports' NBA coverage. Games on CBS simply used the CBS logo on Turner's graphics package, including the Final Four and National Championship Game.

=== 2016–2019 ===
With CBS Sports unveiling a new branding look at Super Bowl 50 in February 2016, a new graphics package was unveiled. This time, the networks all used CBS's graphics. Despite this being the first year that the Final Four and National Championship aired on TBS (as part of an every-other-year arrangement), the 2016 CBS graphics are now used for all games, including those on TBS, TNT and truTV. However, the games use a slightly different version of the scoreboard that has the network logo in the middle, and in black, as opposed to the usual white logo on the left. For TBS/TNT/truTV games, the network logo simply replaces the CBS eye logo.

This tournament version of the scoreboard is anchored to the edges of the screen with shadows, which light up in team colors after a made basket, an effect not seen on CBS's graphics anywhere else. NBA on TNT and Major League Baseball on TBS also used this graphic package.

In 2018, CBS and Turner modified their logo for March Madness, by changing it to the logo introduced by the NCAA in 2016. However, despite the logo change, the in-game graphics remained unchanged.

=== 2021–present ===
Following CBS Sports' rebranding during the week of Super Bowl LV, as part of CBS' unified branding, CBS and WarnerMedia unveiled a new in-game graphics package for the tournament during the Selection Show. However, despite the graphics change, the logo, which was introduced in 2018, remains unchanged.

The tournament version of this scoreboard uses a similar layout of CBS's regular season graphics, with the CBS, TBS, TNT and truTV logos on the left side of the score bar, and an extra bar being added to the end displaying what round and which region each game is in (e.g. NCAA West 1st Round).

Beginning with the 2025 NCAA tournament, the windows scoreboard time and slots have changed, with the usual NCAA logo replaced with the NCAA March Madness logo that was presented in 2016 overlaying on the right side with no backing at all (except for the logo sponsors that’ll still have backings), with the lines for each window slot are now blue instead of white. Despite the change, the scoreboard in-game graphics layout with the logos on the left side which took effect in 2021, remains unchanged.

== Theme music ==
As previously mentioned, all four networks use a variation of the CBS College Basketball Theme during the tournament, arranged by Trevor Rabin, who scores the iconic Inside the NBA theme. CBS had continued to use the arrangement that had been in use since 2004 during its regular season coverage, but switched to the March Madness version during the 2021–22 season. Since 1987, CBS/TNT Sports's coverage of March Madness always concludes with "One Shining Moment", the current version performed by Luther Vandross.

During select intros and into commercial breaks in the 2016 coverage, all broadcasters used "Turn Up" by The Heavy as the bumper music.

For the 2017 tournament, all broadcasts used "Something Just Like This" by American EDM group The Chainsmokers and British group Coldplay, as its bumper music.

For 2018, CBS and Turner used Irish-Rock band U2's song "American Soul", from their new album Songs of Experience. They also used "Say Amen (Saturday Night)" by American rock band Panic! at The Disco during the Final Four on TBS.

2019 featured the return of The Black Keys to March Madness, with their comeback single Lo/Hi, off their comeback album Let's Rock, being used as the main song for CBS and Turner's coverage. CBS also used "Hey Look Ma, I Made It" by Panic! at the Disco for the Bracket Preview Show.

After three years of using alternative/rock artists, in 2020, CBS and Turner were scheduled to use "Dance Again", by American pop singer Selena Gomez.

2021 continued the planned trend of using electronic dance music, with CBS and Turner using "Big Love" by American DJ duo Louis the Child and American hip hop duo EarthGang. CBS also used This Is Heaven by American pop singer Nick Jonas for the Final Four.

In 2022, CBS and Turner used "Freedom" by Jon Batiste, a jazz and R&B singer from New Orleans (coincidentally, the host city of that year's Final Four) who was the bandleader for CBS's The Late Show with Stephen Colbert at the time.

In 2023, CBS and WBD used "Take My Breath" by The Weeknd.

In 2024, CBS and TNT used "Dance with Everybody" by Drew Holcomb & The Neighbors featuring The National Parks.

In 2025, CBS and TNT used "Abracadabra" by Lady Gaga.

In 2026, CBS and TNT used "Give It Away" by Zac Brown Band.
