= Jared Greenberg =

American sportscaster

- Born: December 12, 1984 (age 41)
- Education: Hofstra University
- Occupations: Sports commentator Sideline reporter
- Years active: 2011–present

Jared Greenberg (born December 12, 1984) is an American sports television personality. He is a basketball sideline reporter and fill-in play-by-play commentator for the NBA on TNT. Jared Greenberg worked as a play-by play man with Brendan Haywood and Nabil Karim for the 1st round of the 2025 NBA Playoffs for NBATV.

== Early life and education ==
Greenberg grew up in Mahwah, New Jersey. As a freshman at Mahwah High School, he took an elective in television production. In class he heard that Ramapo College, a local school, was looking for high school volunteers to manage the audio control board and schedule music for its WRPR 90.3 FM radio station. On his first day he realized that broadcast media was where he wanted to be. With a passionate interest in sports, he took advantage of this opportunity to host a sports talk show, and eventually did play-by-play for Ramapo's baseball and basketball teams. After high school, he attended Hofstra University, graduating in 2005. While there he did radio play-by-play for football, basketball, softball, baseball and lacrosse; as well as hosting sports talk radio programs with Ira Thor.

== Professional career ==
As a junior in college, he had his first experience in television, doing basketball sideline reporting for MSG and Comcast. Late in college he was a public relations intern for the New York Giants. This led to becoming the statistician for the radio play-by-play announcer Bob Papa. He described this as an important learning experience and did it for several years. After graduating college, he worked for the Newark Bears, an independent professional baseball team in media relations, and did his first professional play-by-play broadcasting. After a period of freelancing for News 12, NBA TV and ESPN 360, he signed with MSG. He covered high school sports in the New York metropolitan area beginning in 2009, helping to launch the now defunct MSG Varsity. His experience with an array of high school sports enabled him to become knowledgeable in non-major professional sports, including field hockey, lacrosse, wrestling, volleyball and softball. In 2012 he was hired by TNT and moved to Atlanta. In 2020 he debuted as a sideline reporter on the NBA on TNT. On the NBA App, Greenberg began hosting NBA CrunchTime, the NBA equivalent of NFL RedZone in 2022. For NBA TV he has also been a sideline reporter, host, reporter and anchor.

In 2025 he began hosting NCAA March Madness Fast Break, the whiparound stream of first and second round NCAA Division I Men's Basketball Tournament games.

On the SiriusXM NBA station, he hosted Out of Bounds, FanDuel Fantasy Basketball, and Off the Dribble. He has also hosted 10 Before Tip, The Jump Ball, NBA Gametime, Making The Call and Shaqtin' a Fool for TNT Sports.

Greenberg has been touted among the most likely targets for new NBA broadcasting jobs as the league expands its number of networks.

=== Controversies ===
In 2025 he reported that center Mark Williams had back issues that "stunted his growth" and kept him out of the weight room. He later apologized and retracted those comments as inaccurate.

In 2023 he called out coach Gregg Popovich for his condescending interviews with the media. He said the San Antonio Spurs organization needs to embrace the media rather than view it as an enemy. In 2015 he had a notably "excruciating" interview with Popovich in which the coach trolled Greenberg, "[shutting] him down in a gloriously awkward exchange."
