= Lauren Shehadi =

American sportscaster

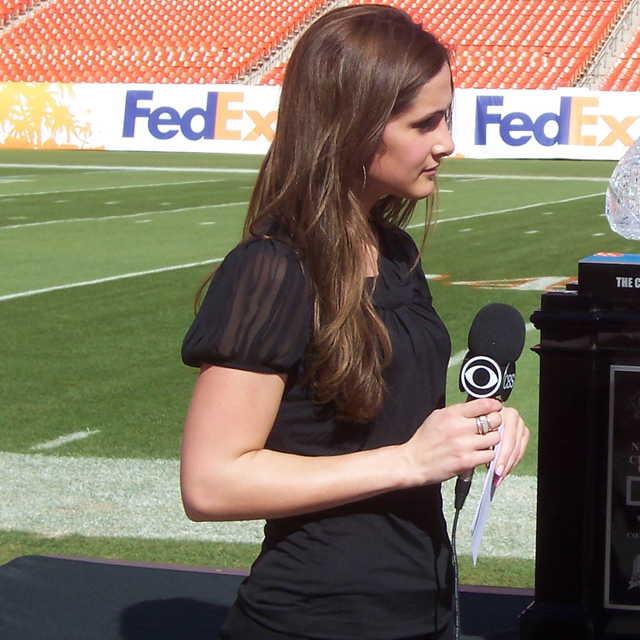
- Shehadi covering the 2009 BCS National Championship Game
- Born: Julia Lauren Shehadi; May 23, 1983 (age 43); McLean, Virginia, U.S.
- Education: University of Florida
- Occupation: Sportscaster
- Years active: 2007–present
- Employer(s): MLB Network; TNT Sports

Julia Lauren Shehadi (born May 23, 1983) is an American sportscaster for the MLB Network and TNT Sports.

== Career ==
Shehadi attended Langley High School in McLean, Virginia, graduating in 2001. In college at the University of Florida she served as the host of the online Gatorzone. She also worked as an intern for The Best Damn Sports Show Period and as a sports anchor for KXMC-TV in Minot, North Dakota.

Shehadi worked for CBSSports.com and CBS College Sports Network. In addition to serving as the host for many of the videos on CBSSports.com, Shehadi was the co-host of the SEC Tailgate show and the ALT Games with Jonny Moseley on the CBS College Sports Network. In 2010 she was a candidate for Playboy’s "Sexiest Sportscaster" contest.

Shehadi joined the MLB Network in 2012. She previously hosted The Rundown on MLB Network alongside Matt Yallof and currently hosts MLB Central alongside Robert Flores and Mark DeRosa.

In January 2018, Shehadi started hosting a podcast called The Podium, a podcast between NBC Sports Group and Vox Media, which focuses on athletes and events at the 2018 Winter Olympic Games in PyeongChang, South Korea. In October 2018, she worked as the on-field commentator during TBS's coverage of the 2018 American League Championship Series.

On March 10, 2020, Shehadi was announced to be a sideline reporter for CBS and Turner's March Madness coverage for the first time. She was scheduled to work with Andrew Catalon and former Villanova head coach Steve Lappas, replacing Lisa Byington, who was promoted to the number 6 team, with Spero Dedes, Steve Smith, and Wally Szczerbiak, replacing Ros Gold-Onwude, who departed Turner Sports for ESPN. However, she along with Dwyane Wade and Adam Lefkoe had their NCAA Tournament debuts pushed back to 2021since the 2020 tournament was canceled two days later over concerns of COVID-19.

== Personal life ==
Shehadi is of Lebanese descent. She grew up a fan of the Baltimore Orioles.
