= TNT Sports (United States) =

Secondary sports division of Skydance Corporation

- Formerly: TBS Sports (1973–1995); Turner Sports (1995–2024)
- Type: Division
- Industry: Broadcasting
- Genre: Sports
- Predecessor: Discovery Sports
- Founded: April 6, 1973; 53 years ago
- Headquarters: Atlanta, Georgia
- Key people: Luis Silberwasser (Chairman and CEO, TNT Sports: 2022–2026); Andrew Georgiou (President, TNT Sports International: 2022–present); David Berson (President and CEO: 2026–present)
- Brands: Golf Digest; Bleacher Report
- Services: NHL; MLB; NCAA basketball (including NCAA men’s tournament); NCAA football (including College Football Playoff); USA Soccer; NASCAR; Unrivaled; French Open; All Elite Wrestling
- Owner: AT&T (2018–2022); Warner Bros. Discovery (2022–2026); Skydance (2026–present)
- Parent: Turner Broadcasting System (1979–2019); WarnerMedia News & Sports (2019–2022); Warner Bros. Discovery Sports (2022–2026); Skydance Sports (2026–present)
- Website: tntsports.com

TNT Sports is a sports broadcasting division of Skydance that is responsible for sports broadcasts on its parent company's streaming service HBO Max and primarily the TruTV, TBS and TNT cable channels. The division also operates the online digital media outlets for the NCAA, PGA Tour and PGA of America; the sports news website Bleacher Report; and owns a minority share in MLB Network. Its name originates from the TV network TNT.

TNT Sports' formation dates back to the 1970s as the sports division of Turner Broadcasting System's basic cable networks, with separate TNT Sports and TBS Sports brands for TNT and TBS, respectively. A unified Turner Sports brand was then introduced in 1995, followed by Turner Broadcasting merging into Time Warner in 1996. Following AT&T's acquisition of Time Warner in 2018 (which would become WarnerMedia), Turner Sports was combined with CNN and AT&T SportsNet into a new division known as WarnerMedia News & Sports.

In 2022, Warner Bros. Discovery was formed after AT&T spun off WarnerMedia, who merged with Discovery, Inc. WarnerMedia News & Sports was split into two: CNN Worldwide and Turner Sports, with the latter being combined with Discovery Sports to create Warner Bros. Discovery Sports, although this was just a rename of Turner Sports, which was the surviving company. The division slowly began to adopt its current branding in fall 2023, named after TNT. However, it was not until January 18, 2024, that the unit would officially rebrand as TNT Sports.

The company's European sports operations such as TNT Sports and Eurosport folded into "Warner Bros. Discovery Sports Europe".

== History ==
=== As TBS/Turner Sports ===
Former Turner Sports logo, used from 2007 to 2022

The division began on April 6, 1973, after Ted Turner (founder of Turner Broadcasting System) added the Atlanta Braves baseball games to his UHF station WJRJ in Atlanta, Georgia. The games aired on Turner Broadcasting System's basic cable networks until Turner bought rights on January 6, 1976. By 1979, Superstation WTBS was available in most homes in North America. During the 1980s, the division began using separate brands such as TBS Sports and TNT Sports for TBS and TNT, respectively. In 1995, a unified Turner Sports rebranding began to be used, accompanied by an intro and outro sequence featuring the voice of CNN Headline News anchor Don Harrison and music from Edd Kalehoff. In 1996, Turner Sports became a division of Time Warner after it merged with Turner Broadcasting System.

Turner Broadcasting also owned WPCH-TV, the former WTBS, which was the longtime television home for Major League Baseball's Atlanta Braves. The relationship with WPCH ended after the 2013 season and the station itself was sold in 2017.

In August 2012, Turner Sports acquired the sports news website Bleacher Report for $175 million.

In 2018, Turner Sports launched a subscription streaming service as a branch of Bleacher Report, known as B/R Live; it would be anchored by Turner's recently acquired rights to the UEFA Champions League, while also featuring content from the NCAA, NBA League Pass, and others.

Following AT&T's acquisition of Time Warner in 2018, it was announced in March 2019 that the Turner Broadcasting System would be dissolved, and its assets dispersed into Warner Bros. and two new units. Turner Sports was combined with CNN and the AT&T SportsNet regional sports networks into a new division known as WarnerMedia News & Sports, led by CNN president Jeff Zucker.

In October 2020, Turner Sports announced a partnership with DraftKings to be the exclusive provider of daily fantasy and sports betting information for most Turner Sports and Bleacher Report properties, excluding the NBA due to its league-wide deal with competitor FanDuel.

=== As TNT Sports ===
Warner Bros. Discovery Sports logo

In 2022, Warner Bros. Discovery was formed with the spin-off of WarnerMedia by AT&T, and its merger with Discovery, Inc. Turner Sports was then renamed as Warner Bros. Discovery Sports after its merger with the sports divisions for WarnerMedia and Discovery, with the brand also being used for the division that manages Discovery's existing European and international sports assets such as Eurosport, Golf Digest, and Global Cycling Network.

In January 2024, WBD officially rebranded the entirety of the division as TNT Sports. The brand had already been used for Turner Sports' networks in Latin America, and had also recently been introduced to the United Kingdom as a rebranding of BT Sport (after WBD acquired a controlling stake in the broadcaster).

On February 6, 2024, WBD announced a joint venture with ESPN Inc. and Fox Sports to offer a sports streaming bundle, named Venu Sports, including the three organizations' main linear sports channels and associated media rights, beginning in fall 2024. The service was ultimately cancelled.

On March 7, 2024, WBD announced a new evening and primetime block for TruTV focused on TNT Sports content beginning on March 11. This will include alternate broadcasts of sporting events carried by its sister networks, as well as new studio shows, and sports-related documentaries and films. The division's vice president Luis Silberwasser stated that the block would give TNT Sports a more "consistent" and "comprehensive" presence on its networks. The division sold its majority stake of the Motor Trend Group to Hearst Communications in 2024.

=== Planned merger with CBS Sports ===
In February 2026, WBD agreed to be acquired by Paramount Skydance. TNT Sports will initially co-exist with Paramount's CBS Sports unit after the completion of the sale, but it is expected that the two divisions will eventually merge. In April 2026, it was reported that "if all goes according to plan", Paramount planned to begin merging TNT Sports into CBS Sports by the third quarter of 2026, and it was suggested that current CBS Sports president David Berson would lead the merged operation.

On October 5, 2026, the day before the deal was set to close, it was reported that TNT Sports CEO Luis Silberwasser would step down, and that Berson would—as previously suggested—lead the combined division. John Ourand reported that the consolidation of TNT Sports into CBS Sports was anticipated to be a "bloodbath", with analysts suggesting that the division planned to shed redundancies, as well as some of the newer sports properties it had acquired in order to compensate for its loss of the NBA in 2025, and reconsider renewals of its MLB and NHL rights as part of a strategy to focus on sports properties that would bolster Skydance's direct-to-consumer businesses, and to ensure that CBS Sports will be able to afford its next NFL contract when the league triggers its option to renegotiate.

As for the on-air effects of the acquisition, it was reported that Skydance executives were exploring the possibility of giving certain TNT Sports properties—either exclusively or via simulcasting—a broadcast television presence on CBS (such as NASCAR and the Stanley Cup Final) if contractually possible (including factors such as carriage agreements with television providers for the Turner channels which may contain commitments that certain events will be televised exclusively by that channel). After having met with Skydance CEO David Ellison prior to the purchase, NASCAR CEO Steve O'Donnell stated during a Front Office Sports conference that he planned to meet with Berson.

== Programs throughout the years ==
=== Current properties ===
- NASCAR on TNT Sports (1983–2014, 2025–present) (co-produced with NBC from 2001 to 2006)
- NBA on TNT (1989–2025)
  - Inside the NBA (From the 2025–26 season this series is fully produced and staffed by TNT Sports but airs exclusively on ESPN platforms such as ESPN and ABC.)
  - International rights to NBA games outside U.S. and maintaining the league's digital properties
- MLB on TBS (2007–present)
  - Tuesday night games (2022–present) (1 game every week during the regular season, co-exists with regional broadcasts)
  - MLB Leadoff
  - MLB Closer
  - MLB postseason (select playoff games/overflow on TNT)
    - American League Division Series and Championship Series (even-numbered years)
    - National League Division Series and Championship Series (odd-numbered years)
- NHL on TNT (2021–present)
  - Up to 72 exclusive national games per-season (Wednesdays and some Sundays in the second half of the season)
  - NHL Face Off
  - NHL Post Game
  - Winter Classic (annually)
  - Thanksgiving Showdown (annually since 2022)
  - Heritage Classic (selected years, the Heritage Classic is not held every season)
  - TBS and truTV may also air simulcasts, alternative broadcasts, or overflow coverage
  - Stanley Cup playoffs
    - Selected first and second round games (first round co-exists with regional broadcasts).
    - One exclusive conference finals series per season (ESPN/ABC has first choice as to which conference to air, TNT then broadcasts the other series).
    - Exclusive coverage of the Stanley Cup Final in odd-numbered years (alternates with ABC).
  - NHL Awards (odd-numbered years on TNT; alternates with ESPN).
- All Elite Wrestling (2019–present)
  - AEW Dynamite (First Live Television on Wednesday Night and exclusively broadcast on TBS since 2022) (2019–present)
  - AEW Collision (Second Live Television on Saturday Night and exclusively broadcast on TNT except other sports conflicts which then airs on TBS) (2023–present)
- College Basketball on TNT Sports
  - NCAA Men's Division I Basketball Championship (2011–present; in partnership with CBS Sports)
    - First Four on truTV (except for 2021 which aired on both truTV and TBS)
    - First and second rounds on TNT, TBS, and truTV alongside CBS
    - Sweet Sixteen and Elite Eight split between CBS and TBS, with simulcasts of TBS games on truTV
    - Final Four in 2014 and 2015 on TBS
    - Final Four and National Championship in even-numbered years from 2016 until 2026 (except 2020 due to COVID-19 pandemic in the United States) (airs on TBS; TNT and truTV may also air simulcasts or alternative broadcasts) (was scheduled to 2032 but after consolidation of TNT and CBS expected to be exclusive to CBS)
  - Invesco QQQ Legacy Classic (2021–present)
  - Hall of Fame Series (2023–present)
  - Players Era Festival (2024–2025)
  - Big East men's and women's basketball (2025–present)
  - Big 12 Men’s and Women’s Basketball (2025–present)
- College Football on TNT Sports
  - Big 12 Conference football on TNT (2025–present)
  - College Football Playoff (2024–present, two first round games in sublicensing agreement with ESPN)
- ELeague (Turner Sports/WME-IMG Partnership, since 2016)
- Golf
  - The Match (2018–present) (airs in simulcast across TNT, TBS, TruTV, and HLN)
  - Capital One MLB Open (2025–present)
- Soccer (2023–present)
  - United States men's and women's national team home matches (such as friendlies and FIFA World Cup qualification home matches).
  - SheBelieves Cup
  - FIFA Club World Cup (2025, sublicense from DAZN, linear only)
- Cycling (2024–present) (airs exclusively on HBO Max)
  - Giro d’Italia
  - Union Cycliste Internationale
- FIA World Endurance Championship (2018–present)
  - All session coverage on HBO Max (2024–present)
  - 24 Hours of Le Mans, 6 Hours of São Paulo and Lone Star Le Mans on TruTV (2026–present)
- Tennis on TNT (2000–2002, 2025–present)
  - French Open coverage on TNT, TBS, TruTV and HBO Max.
- Unrivaled (2025–present)
- FIBA basketball championships (2026–present)
  - FIBA World Cup (remaining qualifiers and finals tournament)
  - FIBA Women's World Cup (qualifiers and finals tournament)
  - Eurobasket
- Savannah Bananas baseball (2024–present)
  - 15 games on TruTV
- Boxing (2026–present)
  - Monthly events branded The Fight
  - Sublicense from DAZN
  - Featuring matches from Top Rank, Matchroom Boxing, Golden Boy Promotions, and Queensberry Promotions

=== Other properties ===
- MLB Network (cable channel; 16.67% with Major League Baseball, Comcast, Charter Communications and Cox Communications)
- Golf Digest (magazine)

=== TNT Sports Interactive properties ===
- NCAA.com
  - Starting with the 2010–11 academic year and continuing through 2031–32, Turner has digital rights to all NCAA championships across all divisions in all sports except football. Under the deal, Turner also manages NCAA.com.
- Bleacher Report (website)
  - In February 2019, Turner announced a deal with casino operator Caesars Entertainment Corporation to open a Bleacher Report studio in the sportsbook at Caesars Palace to produce sports betting programming and gaming-related editorial content. The new studio is expected to begin distributing this content by early summer 2019.
  - B/R Gridiron (social media network; NFL coverage only)
  - B/R Hoops (social media network; March Madness coverage and NBA digital coverage)
  - B/R Walk-Off (social media network; MLB coverage only)
  - B/R Open Ice (social media network; NHL coverage only)
  - B/R Wrestling (social media network; especially All Elite Wrestling and Ring of Honor only)
  - B/R Racing (social media network; especially NASCAR)

=== Former properties ===
==== AT&T SportsNet ====
- AT&T SportsNet Pittsburgh (sold to Fenway Sports Group)
- AT&T SportsNet Southwest (sold to a joint venture between the Houston Rockets and Houston Astros)
- AT&T SportsNet Rocky Mountain (defunct regional sports network)
- Root Sports Northwest (regional sports network; 29% stake with Baseball Club of Seattle, LP; had sold its stake to the Mariners as of January 2024)

==== Global Cycling Network ====
- GCN+ and GCN App (closed on December 19, 2023)

==== Motor Trend Group ====
- MotorTrend+ (subscription streaming service) (closing at the end of March 2024, with most of its subscribers and programming migrating to Discovery+ and Max)
- Motor Trend (cable channel)
- Hot Rod (magazine)
- Four Wheeler (magazine)
- Motor Trend (magazine)
- Motor Trend FAST TV (FAST streaming channel)
- Motor Trend VELOZ TV (Spanish-language FAST streaming channel)

==== Turner South ====
- Atlanta Braves baseball
- Atlanta Hawks basketball
- Atlanta Thrashers hockey

==== CNN/SI ====
- National Lacrosse League
- Women's United Soccer Association

==== TBS ====
- Atlanta Hawks basketball
- Atlanta Thrashers NHL hockey
- Atlanta Chiefs NASL soccer
- Clash of the Champions (1988–1997)
- College Basketball on TBS (1982–1986)
- College Football on TBS (1982–2006)
- Goodwill Games (1986, 1990, 1994, 1998, 2001)
- Braves TBS Baseball (1973–2007)
- Gator Bowl (1993–1994)
- NBA on TBS (1984–2002, Used through 2025 as an overflow feed for the NBA on TNT)
- NCAA Beach Volleyball Championship (2016 & 2017)
- NFLPA exhibition games (1982, during that year's NFL strike)
- Southeastern Conference sports
- U.S. Olympic Gold (1989–1992)
- NFL on TNT (1990–1997, Atlanta area Falcons simulcasts only)

==== TNT ====
- NBA on TNT (1989–2025)
  - NBA Cup:
    - Exclusive Tuesday night conference group play games
    - Exclusive Eastern and Western Conference quarterfinal round in-season tournament games except for one Eastern conference quarterfinal game for ESPN in 2024.
    - Exclusive Western Conference NBA Cup tournament's semifinal game (2023)
    - Exclusive Eastern Conference NBA Cup tournament's semifinal game (2024)
  - Martin Luther King Day games (annually)
  - Exclusive national regular season Thursday night game.
  - Exclusive national regular season Tuesday night games outside of NBA Cup tournament.
  - Spanish language simulcasts on CNN en Español in the United States.
  - NBA All-Star Weekend (2003–2025)
    - Rising Stars Challenge
    - Slam Dunk Contest
    - Three-Point Contest
    - Skills Challenge
    - All-Star Game (simulcast and/or alternate presentation on TBS and TruTV)
  - NBA play-in tournament:
    - Exclusive 7–8 seeded games, both conferences (2022–2025).
    - Exclusive Eastern Conference No. 8 seed game (odd-numbered years)
    - Exclusive Western Conference No. 8 seed game (even-numbered years)
  - NBA playoffs (1990–2025)
    - First round (generally Sundays through Thursdays, and selected Saturday games, co-exists with regional broadcasts)
    - Second round (generally Sundays through Wednesdays, and selected Saturday games)
    - Exclusive Western Conference Finals (even-numbered years)
    - Exclusive Eastern Conference Finals (odd-numbered years)
  - NBA HBCU CLASSIC (2021–2025)
- NFL on TNT (1990–1997)
- NHL on TNT
  - NHL Stadium Series (2022)
- Olympics on TNT (1992, 1994, 1998) (co-produced with CBS)
- FIFA World Cup (1990)
- Women's United Soccer Association
- Alliance of American Football (2019) (co-produced with CBS/CBS Sports Network/NFL Network)
- Golf on TNT
  - PGA Championship (through 2019)
    - First and second rounds, early coverage of third and fourth.
  - The Open Championship (2002–2009)
    - First and second rounds, early coverage of third and fourth.
- Title Night (1998–2000) (co-produced with CBS)
- UEFA Europa League
  - Final
- UEFA Champions League
  - 46 matches
- Goodwill Games (2000)

==== Turner Sports Interactive ====
- NASCAR.com (2001–2013)
  - NASCAR.COM, and the organization's other digital and social media platforms, were managed by Turner Sports from 2001 to 2013.
- PGATOUR.COM (2006–2012)
  - Turner Sports New Media partnered with the PGA Tour to operate PGATOUR.com, the official site of the tour.
- PGA.com
- GolfTV
- SI.com

==== truTV ====
- MetroPCS Friday Night Knockout (2015) (co-produced with HBO)
- MotoGP (2024)
  - Saturday sprint races and Sunday grand prix aired on TruTV
  - Moto2 and Moto3 aired on Max
- Bellator MMA (2024)
  - Events streaming on Max
  - Supplemental content on TruTV
- College Football on TNT Sports
  - Mountain West Conference football (2024)

==== B/R Live ====
- Belgian First Division A
- Polish Cup
- Scottish Professional Football League
- Scottish League Cup
- Scottish Challenge Cup
- Swedish Cup
- Swiss Cup
- UEFA Europa League
  - All matches on B/R Live for subscribers or pay-per-match.
  - Select qualification stage matches on B/R Live
- UEFA Champions League
  - All matches on B/R Live for subscribers or pay-per-match.
  - Select qualification stage matches on B/R Live
  - UEFA Super Cup (2018 and 2019 only)
- UEFA Youth League

==== First-run syndication ====
- NFLPA exhibition games (1982, during that year's NFL strike)
- Goodwill Games (1986)
- WCW WorldWide (1975–2001)

==== Prime Sports ====
- WCW Prime (1995–1996)

== Notable TNT Sports Personalities (past and present) ==
^D denotes deceased.

- Kate Abdo
- Kenny Albert
- Marv Albert
- David Aldridge
- Adam Alexander
- Brian Anderson
- Debbie Antonelli
- Colby Armstrong
- Stephane Auger
- Shane Bacon
- Champ Bailey
- Ian Baker-Finch
- Amanda Balionis
- Rick Ball
- Charles Barkley
- Rick Barry
- Brent Barry
- DaMarcus Beasley
- Allen Bestwick
- Eric Bischoff
- Paul Bissonnette
- Carter Blackburn
- Josh Bogorad
- Dan Bonner
- Jennifer Botterill
- Brian Boucher
- Shannon Boxx
- Thom Brennaman
- Bob Brenly
- Hubie Brown
- Kris Budden
- Brendan Burke
- Stormy Buonantony
- Jeff Burton
- Lisa Byington
- Kevin Calabro
- Chip Caray
- Skip Caray^{D}
- Anson Carter
- Andrew Catalon
- Vince Cellini
- Chris Chelios
- Darren Clarke
- Doug Collins
- Bob Costas
- Jordan Cornette
- Jamal Crawford
- Victor Cruz
- Wally Dallenbach Jr.
- Chuck Daly^{D}
- Ron Darling
- Seth Davis
- Spero Dedes
- Dusty Dvoracek
- Tim Doyle
- Brian Dunseth
- Ian Eagle
- Dale Earnhardt Jr.
- Dennis Eckersley
- Tarik El-Bashir
- Darren Eliot
- Excalibur
- Marc Fein
- Larry Fitzgerald
- John Forslund
- Julie Foudy
- Jeff Francoeur
- Mike Fratello
- Kevin Frazier
- Rick Fox
- Kevin Garnett
- Katie George
- Mike Golic, Jr.
- Butch Goring
- Dave Goucher
- Jean-Luc Grand-Pierre
- Curtis Granderson
- Danny Green
- Draymond Green
- Jared Greenberg
- Wayne Gretzky
- Natalie Gulbis
- Greg Gumbel^{D}
- Pat Haden
- Randy Hahn
- Kevin Harlan
- Chris Haynes
- Brendan Haywood
- Taryn Hatcher
- Bret Hedican
- Bobby Heenan^{D}
- John Henson
- Grant Hill
- Kevin Kelly
- Shane Hnidy
- Shannon Hogan
- Bridget Howard
- Scott Hudson
- Trevor Immelman
- Andre Iguodala
- Jim Jackson (NBA)
- Jim Jackson (NHL)
- Peter Jacobsen
- Dana Jacobson
- Lauren Jbara
- Chris Jericho
- Avery Johnson
- Ernie Johnson, Jr.
- Ernie Johnson, Sr.^{D}
- Gus Johnson
- Magic Johnson
- Lewis Johnson
- Keith Jones
- Mark Jones
- Roddy Jones
- Mike Joy
- Rick Kamla
- Nabil Karim
- Clark Kellogg
- Steve Kerr
- Quint Kessenich
- Don Koharski
- Kyle Korver
- Allie LaForce
- Steve Letarte
- Steve Lavin
- Adam Lefkoe
- Sean Little
- J. B. Long
- Verne Lundquist
- Henrik Lundqvist
- Kristen Ledlow
- Richard Lewis
- Alyson Lozoff
- Tom Luginbill
- Eli Manning
- Buck Martinez
- Pedro Martínez
- Jamal Mayers
- Tom McCarthy
- Gary McCord
- Booger McFarland
- Taylor McGregor
- Liam McHugh
- Mike McKenna
- Steve McMichael
- Nigel McGuinness
- Larry McReynolds
- Steve Mears
- Brad Meier
- Phil Mickelson
- Meaghan Mikkelson
- Cheryl Miller
- Reggie Miller
- Von Miller
- Matt Murley
- Chris Myers
- Jim Nantz
- Steve Nash
- Bob Neal
- Kevin Negandhi
- Brad Nessler
- Gene Okerlund^{D}
- Eddie Olczyk
- Shaquille O'Neal
- Rosalyn Gold-Onwude
- Melissa Ortiz
- Renee Paquette
- Jesse Palmer
- Darren Pang
- Candace Parker
- Dave Pasch
- Benny Parsons^{D}
- Phil Parsons
- Pat Perez
- Kyle Petty
- Bill Raftery
- Dave Randorf
- Stephanie Ready
- Jackie Redmond
- Drew Remenda
- Ian Riccaboni
- Louis Riddick
- Cal Ripken Jr.
- Taylor Rooks
- A. J. Ross
- Jim Ross
- Vince Russo
- Laura Rutledge
- Craig Sager^{D}
- Bryce Salvador
- Dennis Scott
- Steve Smith
- Tony Schiavone
- Patrick Sharp
- Lauren Shehadi
- Ralph Sheheen
- Jody Shelley
- Joe Simpson
- Kenny Smith
- John Smoltz
- Gary Sheffield
- Gordon Solie^{D}
- Shannon Spake
- Jim Spanarkel
- Takeo Spikes
- Dick Stockton
- Don Sutton^{D}
- Gene Steratore
- John Sterling^{D}
- Casey Stern
- Julie Stewart-Binks
- Wally Szczerbiak
- Kathryn Tappen
- Taz
- Mike Tenay
- Joe Tessitore
- Reggie Theus
- Isiah Thomas
- Justin Thomas
- John Thompson^{D}
- Rick Tocchet
- Jeff Van Gundy
- Stan Van Gundy
- Pete van Wieren^{D}
- Tom Verducci
- Ashali Vise
- Erika Wachter
- Dwyane Wade
- Darius Walker
- Sara Walsh
- Evan Washburn
- J. J. Watt
- Bill Weber^{D}
- Chris Webber
- David Wells
- Ryan Whitney
- Luke Wileman
- Matt Winer
- Bob Wischusen
- Ari Wolfe
- Tracy Wolfson
- Cheyenne Woods
- Keith Yandle
- Matt Yocum
- Larry Zbyszko
- Adam Zucker

== See also ==
- CBS Sports
- Fox Sports
- ESPN/ABC
- NBC Sports
- NCAA Media
- TUDN
