= Brian Anderson (sportscaster) =

American sportscaster (born 1971)

- Born: June 7, 1971 (age 55); Austin, Texas, U.S.
- Education: St. Mary's University (B.A.)
- Occupation: Sportscaster
- Years active: 1998–present
- Employers: MLB Local Media, LLC; Milwaukee Brewers; TNT Sports
- Spouse: Michele Anderson (m. 1994)
- Children: Madeline

Brian Anderson (born June 7, 1971) is an American sportscaster for the Milwaukee Brewers and TNT Sports. Since 2007, he has called play-by-play for the Milwaukee Brewers' telecasts on their various regional sports networks. As a part of his work on the 2007 Brewers Preview Show, Anderson and the then-Fox Sports team were awarded a regional Emmy Award.

Anderson also calls March Madness games for TNT Sports and CBS Sports, along with regular season college basketball games, MLB games, NBA games, The Match golf franchise, and French Open Tennis for TNT Sports.

== Broadcasting career ==
=== Early career ===
Anderson started his career in 1991 as an intern with the San Antonio Spurs while still in college, as a broadcast technician and cameraman. From 1998 to 2000, Anderson handled Minor League and Little League Baseball telecasts for ESPN. He received his start in baseball with the San Antonio Missions, the Double-A affiliate of the Los Angeles Dodgers, serving as a radio/television play-by-play announcer from 1994 to 1998 and from 2000 to 2003. For the Missions, he also was a batting practice pitcher and porter for players.

Anderson worked as a play-by-play announcer at The Golf Channel from 2003 to 2006. In his role there, he served as a host for a variety of the network's events, including the PGA and Nationwide Tours. While with the Spurs, Anderson moved to the front of the camera with FSN Southwest as a sideline reporter for the Spurs from 1999 to 2007, where he saw them win three NBA Championships.

Starting in 2007, Anderson moved on to be the play-by-play announcer for the Milwaukee Brewers on Fox Sports Wisconsin. He is joined by color commentator Bill Schroeder. The duo occasionally also did games for WMLW, a local over-the-air channel in the Milwaukee metro area, but Fox Sports Wisconsin has since become the exclusive local broadcast partner for the Brewers. Anderson remains a member of the Brewers' broadcast booth today.

=== National work ===
Since 2008, Anderson has been part of the Major League Baseball on TBS crew as a play-by-play announcer for postseason coverage, calling the Brewers-Phillies National League Division Series in 2008, the Rockies-Phillies series in 2009, the Reds-Phillies series in 2010 and the Yankees-Tigers American League Division Series in 2011. In 2012, Anderson worked the NL Wild Card Game and NLDS. In 2013, he worked the American League Wild Card tiebreaker between the Rays and Rangers, the AL Wild Card Game and ALDS. From 2014 to 2017, Anderson served as the secondary play-by-play announcer for TBS during the Division Series.

In 2011, Anderson covered for Ernie Johnson during the National League Championship Series, which only by coincidence had the Brewers against the Cardinals; his role was announced before the playoff seedings for the NLDS were fully set. Anderson again returned to calling LCS in 2017, when he called the 2017 National League Championship Series for TBS, as Ernie Johnson was focused on NBA on TNT duties. He has continued to call the LCS every year since.

In 2018, Anderson once again served as lead play-by-play announcer during the MLB postseason in place of Johnson, who stepped aside due to blood clots and being advised not to fly. In this role, Anderson was on the call of the first-ever Division Series featuring the New York Yankees and Boston Red Sox.

In 2010, TBS named him as play-by play announcer on Sunday MLB on TBS regular season broadcasts.

In addition, Anderson started calling NCAA basketball games for ESPN during the 2009–2010 season.

In 2012, he began calling basketball games for the Big Ten Network, concluding in covering the early rounds of the Big Ten Basketball tournament.

Since 2012, Anderson has called play-by-play for Turner Sports and CBS's coverage of the NCAA Division I men's basketball tournament and NBA.

In 2013, he was named lead host for TNT's exclusive coverage of the PGA Grand Slam of Golf.

Anderson is currently a play-by-play announcer for Fox College Hoops.

Anderson replaced an ailing Marv Albert to call undefeated Kentucky's thrilling 68–66 win over Notre Dame at the 2015 NCAA Midwest Regional final in Cleveland, Ohio. He also served as commentator for the Michigan State Spartans team cast during their Final Four game against Duke.

Beginning in 2014, Anderson added NBA on TNT duties to his resume, usually in a fill-in position or as a 3rd announcer when TNT features a rare tripleheader that night, such as on MLK day. He also extensively covers the first two rounds of the NBA playoffs in this position. Until 2021, Wisconsin Badgers play-by-play man Matt Lepay substituted for him on Fox Sports Wisconsin for Brewers games when Anderson was away calling the NBA.

Anderson also began calling some NFL on CBS games during the busier weeks of the 2014 NFL season, when the network's six or seven announcing teams weren't enough to cover the network's games.

Anderson called the 2019 PGA Championship for Golf on TNT, which was the last year for TNT's golf coverage.

Prior to the 2019-20 NBA season, it was announced that as a replacement to the recently eliminated "Players Only" broadcasts which occurred on Tuesday nights beginning during the 2nd half of the season, TNT would instate a more traditional broadcast format to their Tuesday Night slate of games. Anderson was announced to be one of the play-by-play announcers to the weekly scheduled doubleheader, along with longtime Nets announcer Ian Eagle. Anderson is partnered with either Stan Van Gundy or Jim Jackson.

Anderson was on the call for TNT's "The Match" golf series for the May 2020 event featuring Tiger Woods and Peyton Manning defeating Phil Mickelson and Tom Brady from Hobe Sound, Florida, in November 2020 when Mickelson and Charles Barkley defeated Manning and Stephen Curry in Oro Valley, Arizona, in July 2021 in Moonlight Basin, Montana when Bryson DeChambeau and Aaron Rodgers defeated Mickelson and Brady, in November 2021 when Brooks Koepka defeated DeChambeau in Las Vegas, Nevada, and in June 2022 when Rodgers and Brady defeated Josh Allen and Patrick Mahomes, also in Las Vegas.

Anderson signed a multi-year deal with TNT Sports to be a part of their continuation of baseball, college basketball and tennis (part of French Open) coverage.

== Personal life ==
Anderson was born in Austin and grew up in Georgetown, Texas. Anderson played catcher on the nationally ranked baseball team at St. Mary's University, Texas and graduated cum laude from the school in 1993 with a degree in English communications. He has a wife and one child. Anderson is the younger brother of former Reds pitcher Mike Anderson.

Anderson is a Christian. Anderson has spoken about his faith, saying "Not everything depends on what is happening in my particular space. I don’t live or die with my call of a game or a win or loss, or something good or bad at home. I know there is a greater picture, a greater hope; and that is eternity [in Heaven]. ... I will trust in God, who gave His only Son as the ultimate sacrifice, and He did it for me."

Preceded by Ernie Johnson Jr.	Lead play-by-play announcer, Major League Baseball on TBS; 2011; 2017-present	Succeeded by Ernie Johnson Jr. Incumbent
