= Craig Sager =

American sports reporter (1951–2016)

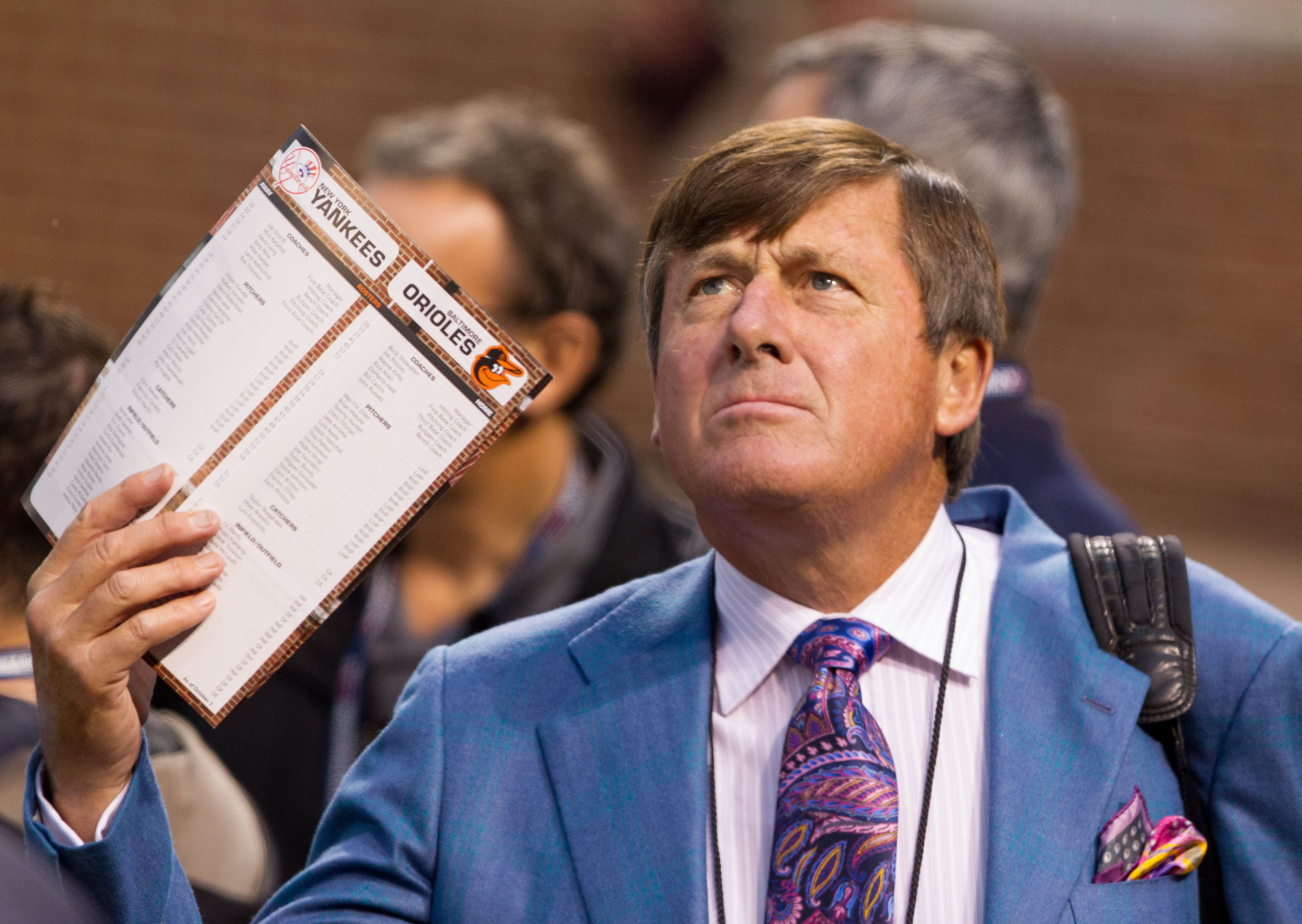
- Sager in 2012
- Born: Craig Graham Sager; June 29, 1951; Batavia, Illinois, U.S.
- Died: December 15, 2016 (aged 65); Atlanta, Georgia, U.S.
- Education: Northwestern University
- Occupations: TV sports broadcaster, commentator and announcer
- Years active: 1972–2016
- Employer(s): Turner Sports (TNT, TBS)
- Spouses: Lisa Gabel (m. 1980–2002) Stacy Strebel (m. 2001)
- Children: 5

Craig Graham Sager (/ˈseɪɡər/ SAY-ghər; June 29, 1951 – December 15, 2016) was an American sports reporter who covered an array of sports for CNN and its sister stations TBS and TNT, from 1981 until his death in late 2016.

Sager worked as a sideline reporter pacing the floors of the National Basketball Association, as he invariably sported one of his vast collection of garishly eccentric jackets and suits. He was a 2016 inductee of the Sports Broadcasting Hall of Fame. During the 2017 NBA All-Star Game, Sager was named the 2017 recipient of the Naismith Memorial Basketball Hall of Fame Curt Gowdy Media Award.

== Early life and education ==
Sager was born June 29, 1951, in Batavia, Illinois. He attended Batavia High School, gaining recognition in 1966 by writing an essay entitled "How and Why I Should Show Respect to the American Flag" for a patriotism contest sponsored by the American Legion. Sager's essay was published in the Congressional Record. It drew editorial accolades from conservative newspapers around the country for his declaration that he was an "untypical teen" of the silent majority that was not part of any protest movement and "happy we were born in America and not in Havana, Moscow, or Peking".

Growing up in Batavia, Sager was friends with his basketball teammates Ken Anderson and Dan Issel. Greg Issel, Dan's brother, was very close with Sager. Anderson became a quarterback in the NFL with the Cincinnati Bengals and was named the NFL Most Valuable Player in 1981. Issel became a Naismith Memorial Basketball Hall of Fame basketball player with the Kentucky Colonels and Denver Nuggets. Later, Issel said of his Batavia teammates: "What Batavia instilled in all three of us—myself, Kenny and Craig—was a solid work ethic. I hope the people of Batavia appreciate how much Batavia meant to Craig and all of us, because we appreciate what Batavia did for us."

Sager was a 1973 graduate of Northwestern University in Evanston, Illinois, where he earned a bachelor's degree in speech. He was a member of the Delta Tau Delta fraternity. After little success on the school's football and basketball teams, Sager found his calling by donning the garb of Willie the Wildcat, the school's mascot, for three years—a foreshadowing of his professional sports entertainment career.

== Career ==
=== Local cable and MLB ===
Sager began his career as a reporter for WXLT (WWSB-Channel 40) in Sarasota, Florida. He worked as a radio news director in 1974, making $95 a week for his efforts, a paltry sum which was supplemented by his access to sports events. Sager was in Atlanta and dodged security to be on the field on April 8, 1974, when slugger Hank Aaron hit his record-breaking 715th home run, brashly seeking to interview the superstar at home plate amidst mass fan pandemonium.

In the mid-1970s, Sager had a short stint as a weatherman at WLCY-TV (WTSP-TV) in St. Petersburg where he was mentored by then Sports Director, Dick Crippen. He then went to WINK-TV in Ft. Myers as a sports reporter where he covered the Kansas City Royals in spring training at Terry Park.

In 1978, Sager joined KMBC-Channel 9 in Kansas City, Missouri, where he broadcast Kansas City Royals spring training games and Kansas City Chiefs preseason games during the 1970s. Sager would remain at the station until 1981. The young reporter was later remembered by Major League Baseball hall of famer George Brett from an encounter at spring training as a "tireless worker" who would set up and focus the camera before conducting his own interview, essentially becoming a "one-man crew".

=== CNN and Turner Sports ===
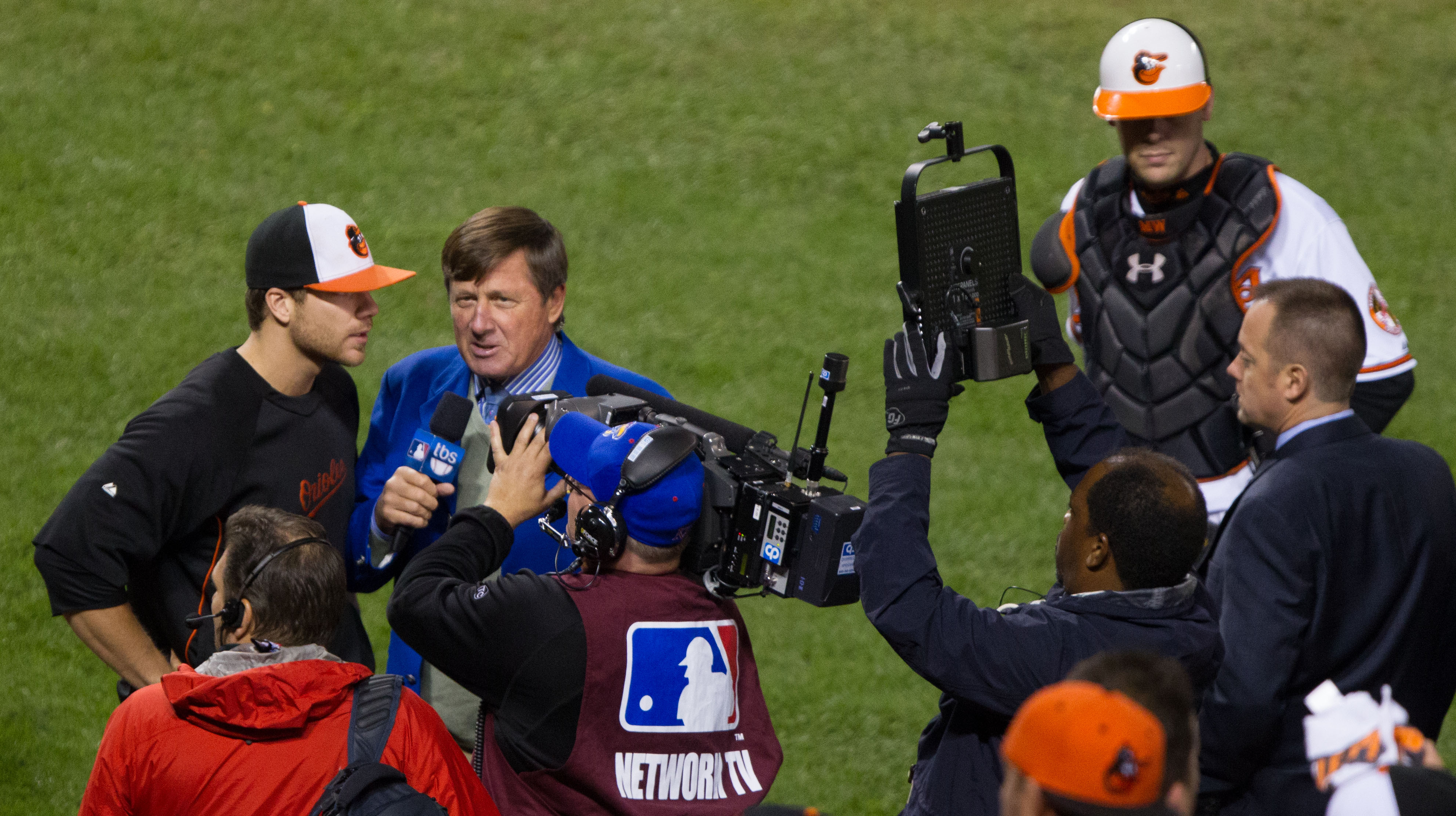
Sager during an MLB game in October 2012

Sager handled the first live remote report by CNN from the 1980 baseball playoffs and joined the network full-time in 1981. While at CNN, he co-anchored CNN Sports Tonight shows, winning a CableAce award for his efforts in 1985. Sager also served as the anchor of College Football Scoreboard on CNN's sports-oriented sister network, TBS, from 1982 to 1985.

In 1987, Sager moved to work full-time at TBS, hosting a 30-minute Sunday night program called The Coors Sports Page as well as handling halftime reports of Atlanta Hawks games.

Sager was posted wherever the network needed him, working before the cameras at Ted Turner's Goodwill Games from 1986 through 2001. He also covered the Pan American Games and the 1990 FIFA World Cup. He called Nordic skiing and curling for sister network TNT's coverage of the 1992 Winter Olympics. He worked on telecasts of golf and tennis, and covered the National Football League on TNT's telecasts from 1990 to 1997.

==== Basketball sideline reporter ====
Sager's best known televised role was sideline reporter for NBA on TNT, for which he received his first Sports Emmy Award nomination in 2012.

A natural entertainer, Sager was famous for his garish choices of clothing—an immense array of sport coats and suits described as "loud," "colorful," and "lively". He rarely wore the same outfit twice. One reporter investigating Sager's accumulated wardrobe stored within the jocular interviewer's home tallied 137 jackets before giving up, without even counting the garments contained in other closets scattered throughout the house. Sager's colorful personality and suits stood in stark contrast to some of the coaches he interviewed, particularly Gregg Popovich of the San Antonio Spurs, who would frequently give short, terse answers to Sager's sideline questions, despite bring friends with Sager offcourt.

In addition to his work on NBA telecasts, Sager reported for TNT at the 1999 Tournament of the Americas Olympic Qualifying Basketball Tournament in San Juan, Puerto Rico, the 2000 USA Basketball Games, and the 2002 World Championships of Basketball. Sager also served as a sideline reporter for the NCAA Men's Division I Basketball Championship, both for Turner Sports and CBS with Marv Albert, Chris Webber, and Len Elmore.

=== NBC Sports ===
In 1999, Sager was loaned to NBC Sports to work as a field reporter for both NBC's coverage of the National League Championship Series and World Series. He was the men's and women's basketball reporter for NBC's Olympic coverage since the 2000 Olympics in Sydney. He served as a reporter for NBC Sports' coverage of basketball at the 2008 Summer Olympics in Beijing.

=== Awards and honors ===
With his life nearing its end, in June 2016, Sager was loaned by Time Warner's Turner Sports to rival Disney's ESPN to cover his first NBA Finals. Sager partnered with NBA on ESPN regular Doris Burke to work the sidelines of Game 6 of the 2016 NBA Finals. Fittingly, his first Finals game was the last game he worked before his death.

On July 13, 2016, Sager was awarded the Jimmy V Perseverance Award at the 2016 ESPY Awards show for battling cancer, which was his final public appearance. In a moving acceptance speech to those gathered and to a national television audience, the terminally ill Sager said:

Time is something that cannot be bought; it cannot be wagered with God, and it is not in endless supply. Time is simply how you live your life.

On December 13, 2016, Sager was inducted into the Sports Broadcasting Hall of Fame just two days before his death. The National Academy of Television Arts and Sciences posthumously awarded Sager his first Sports Emmy Award for Outstanding Sports Personality, Sports Reporter at the 2017 ceremony.

At the 2017 NBA All-Star Game, Sager was named the winner of the Naismith Memorial Basketball Hall of Fame's 2017 Curt Gowdy Media Award. The award was given in September 2017.

Since 2017, a replica of the Sager sports coat that he wore while accepting the Jimmy V Perseverance Award is given as a prize to recipients of Sager Strong Award. It is presented to "an individual who has been a trailblazer while exemplifying courage, faith, compassion and grace." Monty Williams, Dikembe Mutombo, and Robin Roberts were the three winners from 2017 to 2019.

== Illness and death ==
In April 2014, Sager was diagnosed with acute myeloid leukemia and he subsequently missed the entire 2014 NBA playoffs. His son, Craig II, was deemed a match for bone marrow transplant, and Sager underwent the treatment, pushing his cancer into remission.

On April 20, 2014, Craig II did a sideline interview with San Antonio Spurs coach Gregg Popovich between the third and fourth quarters of the 2014 NBA playoffs' first round against the Dallas Mavericks to air a special get-well message to Craig Sager. The NBA on TNT crew did a special tribute to Sager as well, wearing suits similar to those Sager had worn in the past. That same day, during the between-quarters interview segments, all coaches gave get-well messages to Sager.

In late March 2015, Sager announced that his leukemia had returned. It was also announced that doctors had told him that he had three to six months to live without treatment. Sager ultimately endured the process for a third time through the gift of marrow from an anonymous donor.

Sager died on December 15, 2016, at the age of 65. He was memorialized during that evening's broadcast of a game between the Milwaukee Bucks and the Chicago Bulls on the Inside the NBA pregame show, with players of each team wearing tribute T-shirts during warmups designed to look like one of Sager's signature gaudy suits. Sager was lauded for his expertise and courage by his friendly nemesis, head coach Gregg Popovich of the San Antonio Spurs, in a statement before the Spurs' December 15 game. Popovich told the assembled media:

To talk about [Sager] being a professional or good at what he did is a tremendous understatement. ... But he was a way better person than he was a worker, even though he was amazing in that regard. He loved people, he enjoyed pregame, during games, postgame—he loved all the people around it, and everybody felt that. ... What he's endured, and the fight that he's put up, the courage that he's displayed during this situation is beyond my comprehension. And if any of us can display half the courage he has to stay on this planet, to live every [day] as if it's his last, we'd be well off. I miss him very much.

On December 27, 2016, Northwestern University, Sager's alma mater, announced its football team would wear stickers on their helmets in honor of Sager in the Pinstripe Bowl game against Pittsburgh.

On July 13, 2017, NBA Hall of Famer Dan Issel served as speaker at an event at Batavia High School's gymnasium to honor Sager. Sager and Issel were friends and basketball teammates at Batavia High School, when Sager was a freshman and Issel a senior. "To see him have the success he had on the national level was so gratifying to all of us," said Issel.

== Personal life ==
Sager had five children: Kacy, Craig II, and Krista from his first marriage to Lisa Gabel, and Ryan and Riley from his second marriage to Stacy Strebel.

His son, Craig II, was a walk-on wide receiver at the University of Georgia. Craig II also filled in as a sideline reporter during his father's absence in 2014, and is the managing editor for ScoreATL, which covers Georgia high school sports.
