= Meredith Marakovits =

American sports reporter (born 1983)

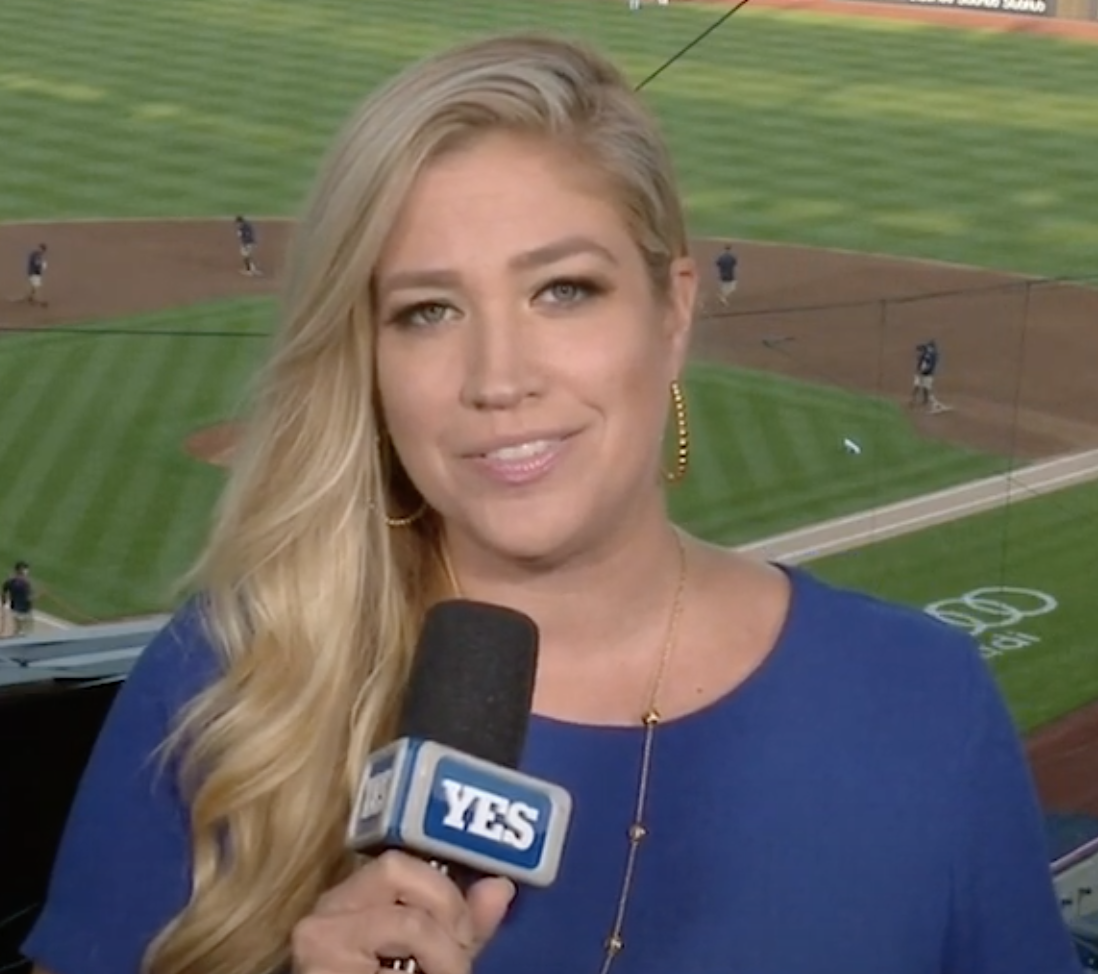
- Marakovits on YES Network from Yankee Stadium in 2020
- Born: Meredith Marakovits; July 22, 1983 (age 43); Walnutport, Pennsylvania, U.S.
- Occupation: Sportscaster
- Years active: 2008–present
- Height: 6 ft (183 cm)

Meredith Marakovits (born July 22, 1983) is an Emmy Award-winning American sports reporter. As of April 2025, she is the YES Network's clubhouse reporter for the New York Yankees of Major League Baseball, where she covers the network's Yankees game broadcasts, pre-game and post-game shows, and contributes to the Yankees Batting Practice Today and Yankees Hot Stove programs.

Marakovits is featured frequently on YES’ special Yankees programming, the YESNetwork.com website, and YES’ various social media platforms. Marakovits previously did radio and television work with ESPN, WFAN, Comcast SportsNet Philadelphia, and SportsNet New York (SNY), covering both local and national sports.

Marakovits worked as a Studio host for TBS select weeks in the 2026 MLB regular season.

== Early life and education ==
Marakovits was born in Walnutport, Pennsylvania in the Lehigh Valley. She attended Allentown Central Catholic High School in Allentown, Pennsylvania, where she played volleyball and was named the Eastern Pennsylvania Conference Most Valuable Player, earned first-team all-District 11 honors, and received all-state honorable mention recognition.

Marakovits graduated from Allentown Central Catholic High School in 2001. She received a scholarship to play volleyball at the NCAA Division I level at La Salle University in Philadelphia, but she suffered from many lower-leg injuries throughout her collegiate career.

Meredith attributes her passion for sports to growing up in an athletic family with two older brothers. She described her younger self as a tomboy who played a wide range of sports, including basketball, softball, swimming, gymnastics, and volleyball. Injuries in college forced her to abandon athletics, and she began exploring a career in sports broadcasting. While in college, Marakovits interned at Fox Sports in Los Angeles for three months, working as a production assistant on the MLB on Fox pregame show with Jeanne Zelasko and Kevin Kennedy, which ignited her enthusiasm for a career in broadcasting. She graduated from La Salle in 2005 with a degree in communications.

== Career ==
=== 2005 to 2009 ===
In 2005, Marakovits began her career as a reporter and photographer with Service Electric, an Allentown, Pennsylvania local TV station that covered Lehigh Valley's high school and college sports. Marakovits worked for the network's sports division as a sideline reporter for their college football, indoor football, and college basketball broadcasts. Beginning in 2006, Marakovits also joined the morning radio show SportsTalk Philadelphia on 950 ESPN/97.5 The Fanatic. She served as the third voice alongside hosts Gregg Henson and former NFL quarterback Glenn Foley, who was later replaced by Jon Marks.

When Service Electric gained rights to the Philadelphia Phillies’ Double-A and Triple-A teams in 2008, she also began covering baseball. Marakovits covered the Reading Fightin Phils, the Phillies’ Double-A affiliate, and served as the pre-game, post-game host, and sideline reporter covering the Lehigh Valley IronPigs, the Phillies’ Triple-A affiliate.

During this time, Comcast SportsNet Philadelphia offered her a segment on their “farm report” covering minor league prospects, which she accepted. Marakovits juggled three jobs through 2009, calling that time in her career “insanity.” That year, she also covered the Yankees-Phillies World Series for SportsNet New York (SNY). She hosted a half-hour on-site pregame show, her first experience reporting from the field at Yankee Stadium.

=== 2010 to 2012 ===
Marakovits left her gig at Service Electric to join ESPN 1050 in 2010, where she covered the New York Mets and New York Yankees. In April 2011, she switched from ESPN 1050 to WFAN-AM 660, serving as a radio voice on one of the nation's "pre-eminent sports-talk radio stations." Marakovits did overnight updates and various reporting and fill-in stints, including on the "Boomer and Carton" morning show.

Over this span, Marakovits continued working as an anchor for SNY, contributing to SNY programs The Wheelhouse, Daily News Live, and GEICO Sportsnite. During this time, Marakovits additionally served as the Philadelphia 76ers sideline reporter and as a contributor to Toyota Sportsnite for Comcast SportsNet Philadelphia. She was also a fill-in anchor at Comcast SportsNet New England.

=== YES Network (2012-present) ===
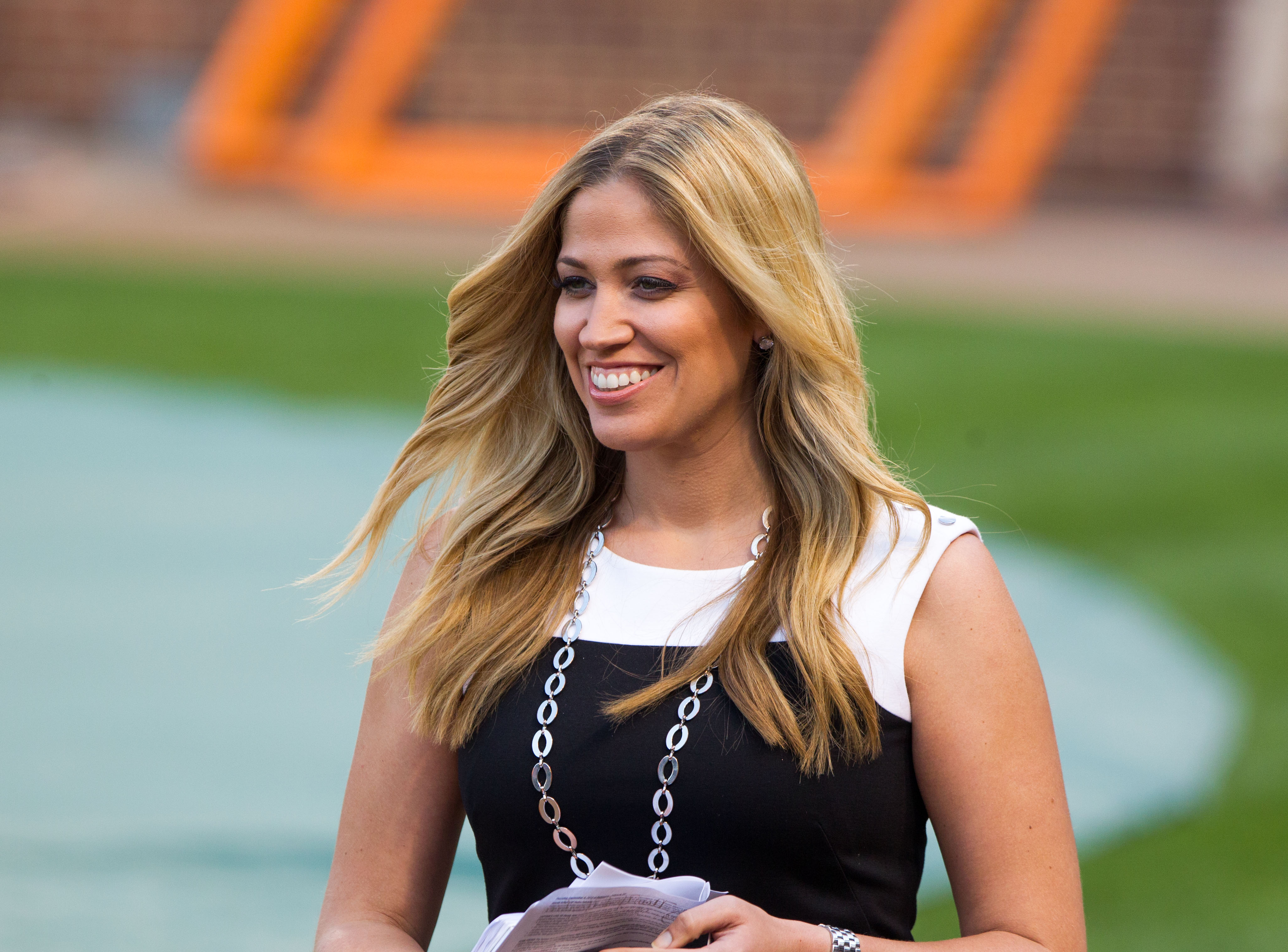
Marakovits at Camden Yards in September 2012

Marakovits interviewing Anthony Rizzo in 2022

In 2012, Marakovits succeeded Kim Jones as the New York Yankees clubhouse reporter for the YES Network. Because she was offered the job late in the baseball offseason, Marakovits began covering the Yankees while simultaneously wrapping up her contract with the 76ers.

In her current role, she covers the network's Yankees game broadcasts, pre-game and post-game shows, and she contributes to the Yankees Batting Practice Today and Yankees Hot Stove programs. Marakovits is featured frequently on YES’ special Yankees programming, the YESNetwork.com website, and YES’ various social media platforms, and she occasionally hosts the network's Brooklyn Nets pre-game and post-game shows. She also often makes guest appearances on MLB Network shows such as The Rundown and MLB Now. In 2022, Marakovits was also featured on a few TBS MLB Tuesday broadcasts, working as a reporter during games. Since 2023, Marakovits has hosted the network's special Batting Practice All-Access shows, which include game previews, player interviews, pre-taped features, and fan questions.

==== The Joe Girardi Show ====
From 2012-17, while Joe Girardi was the Yankees manager, Marakovits hosted the weekly Joe Girardi Show for YES. Marakovits played a key role in revamping The Joe Girardi Show, which began in 2008, helping to move it beyond its original, static interview format. Teaming up with producer Eric Roldan, she introduced more personal, behind-the-scenes segments that showcased Girardi's personality off the field, starting with small “access” pieces. These pieces eventually evolved into on-location episodes, featuring visits to restaurants and tourist spots during road trips, giving fans a fresh, more engaging look at the Yankees’ manager.

==== Social media ====
When the baseball season was shut down in March 2020 because of the COVID-19 pandemic, Marakovits stayed connected with fans and baseball while the YES Network was still developing a content strategy without live sports. She launched a makeshift interview series called “Live with Mere” on Instagram Live, later uploaded to YouTube, where she spoke with friends and colleagues from the sports broadcasting world, including ESPN's Jon Sciambi, MLB Network analyst Al Leiter, and Yankees radio broadcaster Suzyn Waldman. Marakovits also contributed to YES’ “Yes We’re Here” series, interviewing past and current players.

Marakovits has formed a social media duo with Yankees radio broadcaster Suzyn Waldman, with the two regularly documenting their adventures on Instagram. Since 2025, she also films Michael Kay's "chicken tender reviews".

== Awards ==
Marakovits is a nine-time New York Emmy Award winner for her work covering the Yankees on YES Network. She earned two Emmys in 2023, recognized for her reporting and pre-game coverage. In 2024, she received another Emmy for her significant involvement in YES’ full-season Yankees game broadcasts.

In 2019, the trade organization Cynopsis named Marakovits among its “Top Women in Sports,” honoring her in the On-Air Talent category.
