= Marc Fein =

American sports journalist and anchor

- Born: Marc Alan Fein; October 21, 1967 (age 58); Miami, Florida, U.S.
- Occupations: TV sports anchor; journalist; TV show host
- Years active: 1992-present

Marc Fein (born Marc Alan Fein; October 21, 1967 in Miami, Florida) is a sports journalist, sports news anchor, and television sports studio host, formerly one of the main studio hosts for the NBA TV show, NBA Gametime Live. He is also the host of its show, The Beat, and has been the substitute host for Ernie Johnson on the NBA on TNT.

== Broadcasting career ==
Prior to his present work at NBA TV, Fein was at one time the exclusive studio host for and NASCAR on TNT Live!. He formerly hosted TBS College Football and TBS Baseball. He has also hosted Atlanta Thrashers broadcasts on Turner South before the station was sold to NewsCorp.

Prior to joining Turner Sports, Fein worked as a sports anchor, host, and reporter for KDFW-TV in Dallas, Texas. He also hosted a pregame show for the Texas Rangers and Dallas Stars. Before joining KDFW, Fein worked at CNN and CNNSI; and contributed a weekly column for CNNSI.com. In 2009, he filled in for Chip Caray on selected Braves games on Peachtree TV. In 2011, he moved back to Dallas and is one of the current news anchors at KXAS. Fein called for the minor league St. Petersburg Cardinals and the Tampa Spartans men's basketball. He was the radio studio host for the Dallas Cowboys. While a student at University of Miami, he provided play-by-play and color commentary for Miami Hurricanes football, basketball, and baseball.

== Education ==
Fein, who was raised in South Florida, was in the class of 1986 at Ransom Everglades School and is a 1991 graduate of the University of Miami, where he holds a bachelor's degree in communications.
