= David Aldridge =

American sports journalist

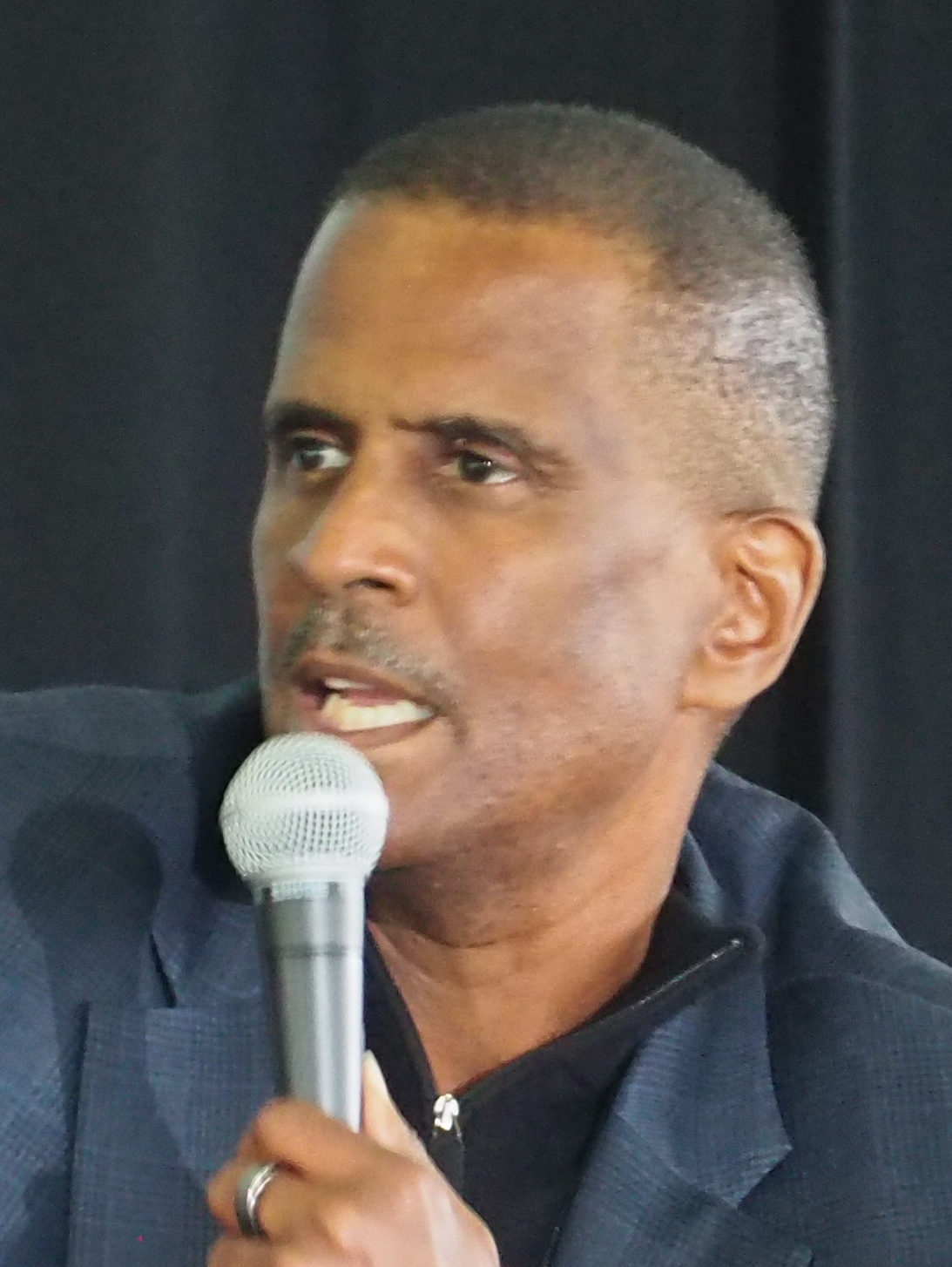
- Aldridge at the 2024 Gaithersburg Book Festival
- Born: 1964 or 1965 (age 61–62); Washington, D.C., U.S.
- Education: American University
- Occupations: Sports journalist Sideline reporter
- Years active: 1987–present

David Aldridge (born 1964 or 1965) is an American sports journalist who works as a writer for The Athletic. He was previously a reporter for Turner Sports, contributing to their NBA and MLB coverage. Other outlets that Aldridge has written and contributed for include ESPN, NBA TV, NBA.com, The Washington Post, The Philadelphia Inquirer, and TBD. In 2016, he was awarded the Curt Gowdy Media Award by the Basketball Hall of Fame.

== Biography ==
=== Education and early career ===
Aldridge was born in Washington, D.C. He is a graduate of DeMatha Catholic High School and American University and worked as a writer for The Washington Post, where he spent nine years. During that time Aldridge was a beat writer covering Georgetown University basketball, the Washington Bullets, and the Washington Redskins. He also covered the 1992 Summer Olympics in Barcelona, national college basketball and football, the Super Bowl, the Stanley Cup playoffs, the World Series, the Indianapolis 500, and the U.S. Open tennis championships. He is a fan of American University men's basketball.

=== ESPN ===
Before joining TNT in 2004, Aldridge reported for ESPN for eight years, primarily covering the NBA while occasionally doing NFL pieces. He wrote for ESPN.com and contributed to ESPN Radio. Aldridge frequently appeared on SportsCenter as well as NBA 2 Night (now NBA Fastbreak) and NBA Today. Aldridge conducted interviews for the SportsCenter "Sunday Conversations" with LeBron James, Allen Iverson, Shaquille O'Neal, Karl Malone and many others. He worked as an NBA sideline reporter both for ABC and ESPN in 2003 and 2004.

=== The Philadelphia Inquirer ===
Aldridge worked at The Philadelphia Inquirer from 2004 to 2008, covering the National Football League and National Basketball Association as a reporter and columnist. He was part of the Inquirer team that received a second-place award for the series "The Future of Pro Sports" in 2005 from the Society of Professional Journalists, Greater Philadelphia Chapter. He was initially scheduled to be one of dozens laid off at the paper in January 2007, but was retained.

=== Turner Sports ===
He worked as the "Insider" for TNT's Inside the NBA and did sideline reporting work during the regular season, All-Star Weekend and the NBA playoffs. He was also co-host of the weekly show The Beat on NBA TV, and was a commentator for other NBA on TNT features. He also worked as a sideline reporter for television broadcasts of college football games and the Major League Baseball divisional series.

=== The Tony Kornheiser Show ===
From February 2007 through June 2008, Aldridge appeared on The Tony Kornheiser Show on Washington Post Radio and later WWWT in Washington, D.C. as co-host. He returned as sometime co-host of the latest incarnation on WTEM in September 2009. As of 2016, he is a regular co-host on the show.

=== The Athletic ===
In late 2018, Aldridge left Turner Sports to join the staff of The Athletic as a writer.
