= Adam Lefkoe =

American sports television personality

- Education: Syracuse University
- Occupation: Sports television host
- Notable credit: Inside the NBA

Adam Lefkoe is an American sports television personality, sportscaster, studio show host, and podcaster for TNT Sports.

== Career ==
Raised in Philadelphia, Adam Lefkoe attended Syracuse University and later served as a sportscaster for WHAS-11 in Louisville, Kentucky. Lefkoe gained acclaim for littering his sportscasts with pop culture references. In 2013, he went viral online for making 41 references to the sitcom Seinfeld over the course of a five-minute sportscast.

In 2014, he began working for the Turner-owned Bleacher Report. While with Bleacher Report, Lefkoe reported on National Football League news. For Bleacher Report, Lefkoe co-hosted Simms and Lefkoe with former NFL quarterback Chris Simms. Of a Jewish background, Lefkoe invited Chicago Bears running back Tarik Cohen to the Jewish Sarge's Deli in New York City, for an episode of Simms and Lefkoe.

He serves as a host on NBA on TNT's Inside the NBA studio show. He hosts the Tuesday editions of the show, filling the role which Ernie Johnson is known for. Also for TNT, Lefkoe hosted studio coverage of the 2024 NCAA Division I men's basketball tournament, as well as The French Open in tennis.

In December 2023, Lefkoe began co-hosting The Big Podcast, hosted by former NBA player and his fellow Inside the NBA host, Shaquille O'Neal. Lefkoe has appeared as a guest on various other sports podcasts, including The Dan Patrick Show and The Ryen Russillo Podcast.

In 2025, Lefkoe renewed with TNT; though the network lost the rights to Inside the NBA, Lefkoe began hosting Big 12 and Big East college basketball coverage for the network, and also anchored NCAA Men's Basketball Tournament, college football, Roland-Garros, and MLB studio coverage.
