= Matt Winer =

American television personality (born 1969)

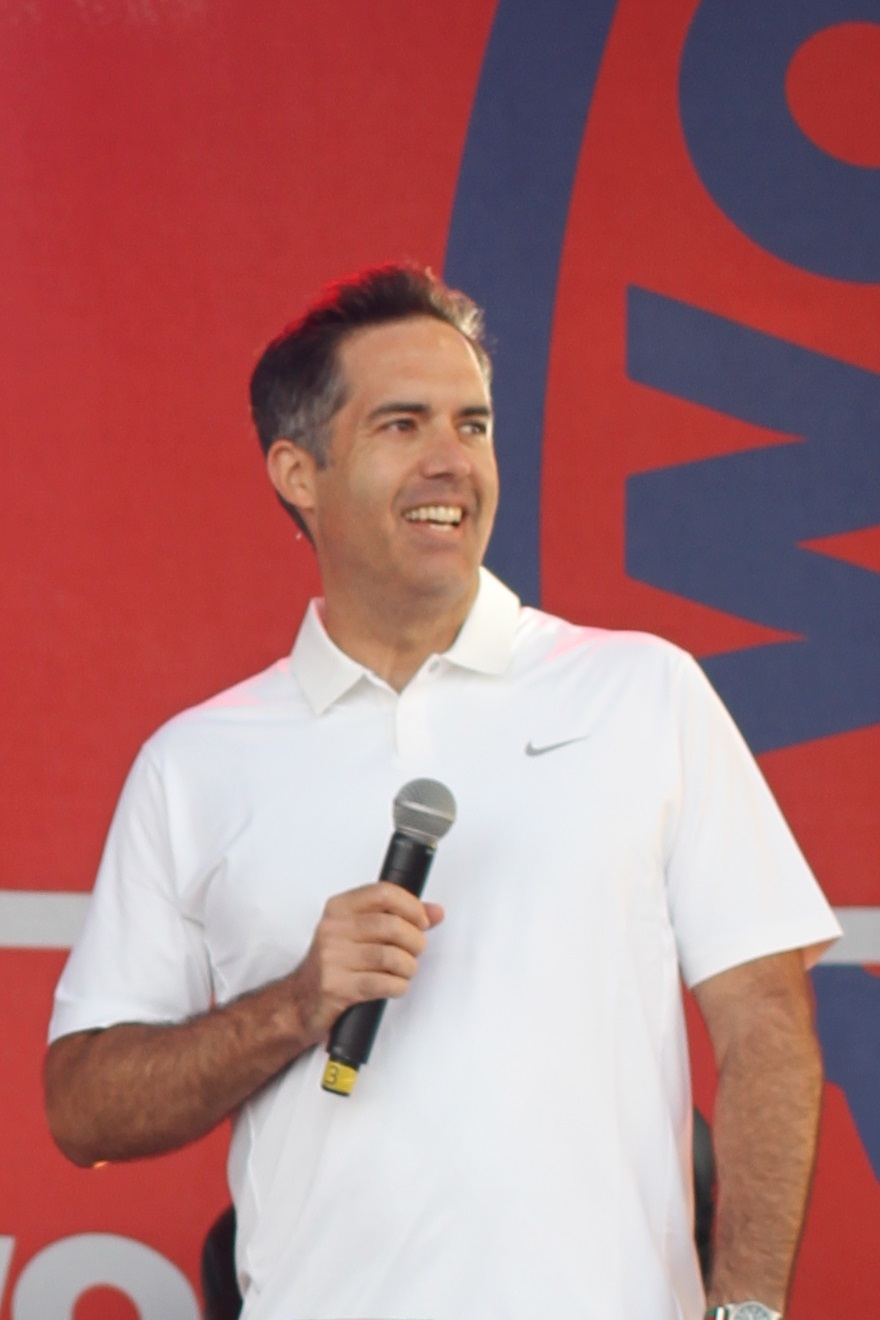
- Winer at the 2014 World Basketball Festival
- Born: St. Louis, Missouri, U.S.
- Education: University of Missouri, 1991, BA in Journalism
- Occupation: Sports broadcaster
- Years active: 1991–present

Matt Winer is an American television personality who last worked for FanDuel Sports Network.

== Career ==
Starting with the 25-26 NBA season, Winer joined FanDuel Sports Network Southeast as Hawks LIVE host and sideline reporter (for select home games and all away games).

Turner Sports signed Winer in 2010 to contribute to coverage of sports across its networks. He became the primary studio host for Major League Baseball on TBS, replacing Ernie Johnson Jr., who moved into a play-by-play role. He is also a studio host on NBA TV, and contributes to TNT's coverage of NASCAR, NBA, and the PGA Tour. He is one of the studio hosts for College Basketball on CBS.

Winer worked for ESPN from 2001 through 2009 He was often seen as an anchor on ESPNEWS and the 6:00 pm ET edition of SportsCenter, or as a host of NBA Fastbreak and College Football Scoreboard. He also hosted the SportsCenter 30 at 30 Update during Saturday Night Football and game updates during ABC's coverage of college football.

Prior to ESPN, Winer worked at four different television stations: KSDK in St. Louis, Missouri (1997–2001); WOOD-TV in Grand Rapids, Michigan (1995–1997); WJTV in Jackson, Mississippi (1993–1995); and KTVQ in Billings, Montana (1991–1993).

== Education ==
Winer is a graduate of the University of Missouri and was a member of the Pi Kappa Alpha fraternity. He has been nominated for four regional sports Emmys.
