= Ernie Johnson Jr. =

American sportscaster (born 1956)

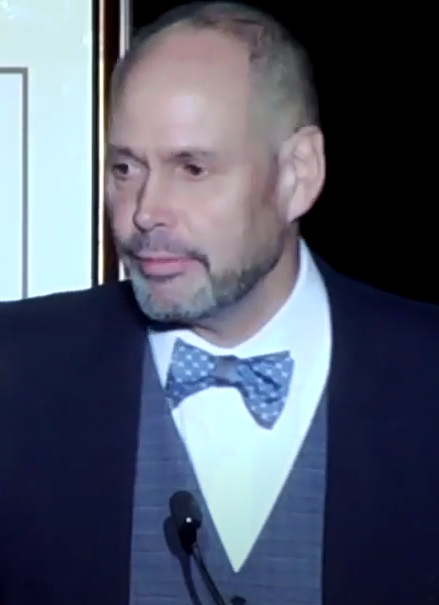
- Johnson in 2019
- Born: Ernest Thorwald Johnson Jr. August 7, 1956 (age 70); Milwaukee, Wisconsin, U.S.
- Education: University of Georgia (BA)
- Occupation: On-air personality / sportscaster for TNT Sports
- Years active: 1977–present
- Spouse: Cheryl Johnson (m. 1982)
- Children: 6
- Father: Ernie Johnson Sr.

Ernest Thorwald Johnson Jr. (born August 7, 1956) is an American sportscaster for TNT Sports. He is the television voice and a studio host for Major League Baseball on TBS, hosts Inside the NBA for ESPN, ABC, and NBA TV (formerly TNT) and contributes to the joint coverage of the NCAA Division I men's basketball tournament for TNT Sports and CBS Sports. His father, Ernie Johnson Sr., was a Major League Baseball pitcher and Atlanta Braves play-by-play announcer. Johnson has been described as one of the greatest sports studio hosts in television history, particularly for his role on Inside the NBA.

== Early life ==
Johnson was born in 1956 in Milwaukee, Wisconsin. His father, Ernie Johnson Sr., was a Major League Baseball pitcher who later became a television sports commentator. Johnson's family moved to Atlanta, Georgia, after his father retired from professional baseball in 1964, when Ernie was eight years old.

Johnson attended high school at the Marist School, a private Catholic school in Brookhaven, Georgia, and graduated in 1974. He then went to the University of Georgia and majored in journalism. Johnson played first base on the Bulldogs baseball team his freshman year. He graduated in 1978 with a Bachelor of Arts, summa cum laude.

== Career ==
During college, Johnson got his first sportscasting job as the news and sports director for the radio station WAGQ-FM in Athens, Georgia.

In 1979, Johnson was hired as a news anchor at WMAZ-TV in Macon, Georgia. He worked there until 1981, when he was hired as a news reporter at WSPA-TV in Spartanburg, South Carolina. Johnson worked in Atlanta at WSB-TV as a general assignment news reporter in 1982. He became the station's weekend sports anchor and reporter in 1983. He held those jobs until 1989, when he left to join Turner Sports.

From 1993 to 1996, Johnson called Atlanta Braves baseball games for SportSouth (now FanDuel Sports Network South) with his father.

=== Inside the NBA ===
==== TNT ====
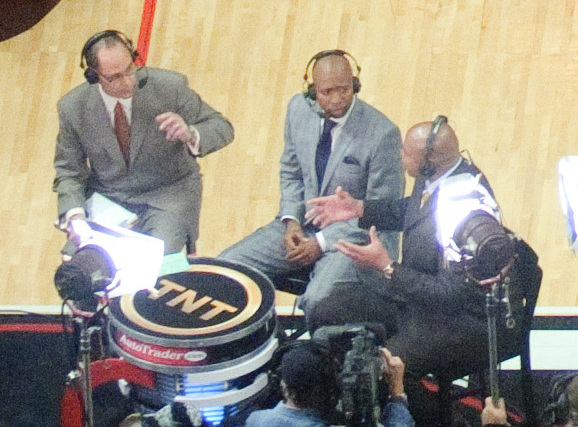
Johnson (left) with longtime broadcasting partners Kenny Smith (center) and Charles Barkley, 2011

Known as "E.J.", Johnson works as the studio host for ESPN's coverage of the NBA, including pregame and halftime shows, and the network's famous postgame studio show that airs after each NBA doubleheader, Inside the NBA. He has hosted the show since 1990.

At the end of each broadcast, Ernie presents "E.J.'s Neat-O Stat of the Night", which has become a popular part of the show but is sponsored by no one, hence the sign that says "Your logo here". This changed in 2007 when vitaminwater sponsored the segment, replaced by Panasonic's Viera line of televisions in 2008. For the 2005–06 season, his segments were sponsored by Intel Centrino and Suzuki. In the 2008 NBA Playoffs, his segments were presented by Geico and vitaminwater.

For all NBA-related shows, Johnson is joined by former NBA stars Kenny Smith, Charles Barkley, Shaquille O'Neal, and occasionally Chris Webber, Grant Hill, or Reggie Miller. In the 2012–13 season he was joined by Anfernee "Penny" Hardaway and Dennis Scott while Smith and Barkley covered March Madness on CBS.

Johnson also hosts Tuesday Fan Night on sister station NBA TV, alongside Webber and Greg Anthony. He also hosts and moderates NBA TV's Open Court, a basketball-panel show featuring Johnson and a rotation of six panelists (all of whom are TNT NBA analysts) discussing various topics, ranging from the history of the NBA to the current state of the league.

In October 2022, Johnson signed a long-term contract extension with Warner Bros. Discovery Sports to continue as a host on Inside the NBA.

==== ESPN ====
After TNT lost NBA rights, Johnson joined ESPN as a studio host for the NBA tip-off and post-game coverage. He reunited with Kenny Smith, Charles Barkley, and Shaquille O'Neal. He worked the service's conference finals, including the NBA Finals coverage, for the first time.

On October 28, 2026, Johnson announced that he would be retiring from Inside the NBA following the end of the 2026–27 NBA season after 37 years of hosting the show. He later specified that he would not be retiring as a broadcaster.

=== Non-NBA assignments ===
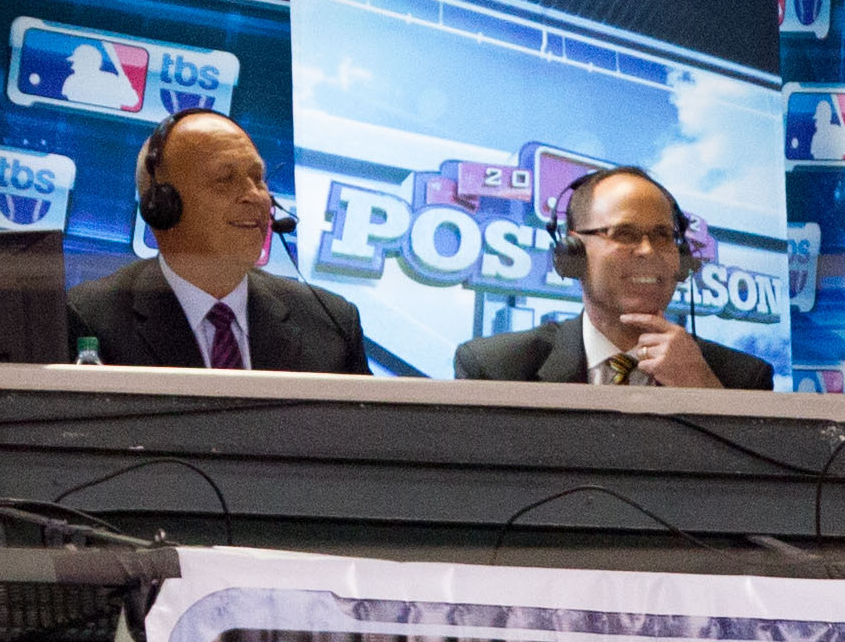
Johnson (right) in the broadcast booth with Cal Ripken Jr. during the 2012 American League Division Series

In addition to working basketball, Johnson is also the play-by-play announcer for TNT's PGA Tour coverage. At TBS, he worked as the studio host for its coverage of college football. In 2002, Johnson was co-winner of the Sports Emmy for Outstanding Sports Personality, Studio Host, tying with Bob Costas of NBC and HBO. It was the first time he had been nominated for a Sports Emmy. In 2006, Johnson won the award again, this time on his own, snapping Costas's six-year streak, including the year the two shared the honor. From 2007 to 2009, Johnson worked as the studio host alongside Cal Ripken Jr. for TBS's coverage of Major League Baseball. In 2010, he moved into a play-by-play role for TBS, serving as the lead broadcaster for TBS's playoff coverage, including the 2010 ALCS. He also broadcast 40 Atlanta Braves games on sister channel Peachtree TV. In 2020, Johnson again became a studio host for TBS's pregame and postgame show while continuing his play-by-play role for TBS's coverage of Major League Baseball.

Johnson's past work at TNT included roles as studio host for The Championships, Wimbledon, from 2000 to 2002, studio host for its National Football League coverage from 1990 to 1997, and various duties at the 1994, 1998, and 2001 Goodwill Games, as well as the 1992 Winter Olympics in Albertville, France, and the 1994 Winter Olympics in Lillehammer. He was the studio host for TNT's coverage of the 1990 FIFA World Cup. He co-hosted Barkley's now-defunct talk show, Listen Up!. Past work at TBS includes working as studio host for its NBA coverage. Johnson also called weightlifting for NBC's coverage of the 2000 Summer Olympics in Sydney. He serves as a studio host for the NCAA tournament for CBS and Turner Sports, alternating with Greg Gumbel until Gumbel's family health issues and death in 2024. After his role increased in 2024 and 2025 because of Gumbel's death, he reduced it in 2026 to focus on his increasing Inside the NBA duties for ESPN, hosting only the Final Four and National Championship Game, with Nate Burleson replacing him in the earlier rounds.

In 2015, Johnson won his third Sports Emmy for Best Studio Host, and gave his award to the daughters of Stuart Scott, who died in January 2015.

Johnson is also a sportscaster on NBA Live 98, and the NBA 2K franchise since 2014.

=== Career timeline ===
Year	Title	Role	Network
1989–2025	Inside the NBA	Lead studio host	TNT
2025–present	Inside the NBA	Lead studio host	ESPN (ESPN2)/ABC
1993–1996	Atlanta Braves on SportsSouth	Play-by-play	
2002–2020	Golf on TNT	Lead play-by-play	TNT
2002–2006	College Football on TBS	Lead studio host	TBS
2006–2010, 2020–2024	MLB on TBS	Studio host	TBS
2010–2021	MLB on TBS	Play-by-play (lead play-by-play 2010, 2012–2018), (regular season 2020–2021)	TBS
2011–present	NCAA March Madness	Lead studio host	CBS/TNT/TBS/TruTV

- 1977–1989: various local news outlets (WAGQ-FM, WMAZ-TV, WSPA-TV, WSB-TV) – sports/news anchor and reporter
- 1990: 1990 FIFA World Cup on TNT – lead studio host
- 1992: 1992 Winter Olympics on CBS/TNT – speed skating play-by-play
- 1994: 1994 Winter Olympics on CBS/TNT – speed skating play-by-play

== Personal life ==
Johnson and his wife, Cheryl, a licensed professional counselor, live in Braselton, Georgia. They have two biological children and four adopted children. Their adopted son Michael died in 2021, aged 33, from Duchenne muscular dystrophy.

Raised Catholic, Johnson now identifies as Protestant and works on a regular basis with the Fellowship of Christian Athletes (FCA), Athletes in Action (AIA), and Samaritan's Feet.

Johnson is a devoted Atlanta Braves fan. Though he was born in Milwaukee, his family moved to the Atlanta area when he was eight, and he considers it his hometown. He attended high school at the Marist School in Brookhaven, Georgia.

In April 2017, he released his memoir, Unscripted: The Unpredictable Moments That Make Life Extraordinary.

=== Health ===
In 2003, Johnson was diagnosed with non-Hodgkin's lymphoma, but continued his work through June 2006, when he began treatment. Due to his cancer, he missed TNT's coverage of the British Open and PGA Championship, the last two major golf tournaments of 2006. Johnson returned to Inside the NBA on October 31, 2006, while continuing chemotherapy.

On October 1, 2018, Johnson announced that he would miss the 2018 MLB postseason on TBS after being diagnosed with blood clots in both of his legs, which affects his ability to travel by air.

== Awards and honors ==
- Six-time Sports Emmy Award winner – Outstanding Sports Personality, Studio Host
- 2021 National Sports Media Association National Sportscaster of the Year (with Scott Van Pelt)
- Indiana Wesleyan University Society of World Changers 2019 Inductee, where he was presented with an honorary Doctorate of Humane Letters
- 2023 Sports Broadcasting Hall of Fame inductee

== Publications ==
- Johnson, Ernie Jr. (2017). Unscripted: The Unpredictable Moments That Make Life Extraordinary. Baker Publishing Group. ISBN 9781493406999.

Preceded by Chip Caray	Lead play-by-play announcer, Major League Baseball on TBS; 2010; 2012–2016	Succeeded by Brian Anderson
