= Shaqtin' a Fool =

US basketball television program

- Starring: Shaquille O'Neal; Ernie Johnson; Charles Barkley; Kenny Smith
- No. of seasons: 8 (TNT seasons); 5 (NBA TV seasons); 2 (ESPN/ABC seasons)

Production
- Production locations: Turner Studio J Atlanta, Georgia
- Running time: 30 minutes

Original release
- Network: TNT (2011–2025); NBA TV (2013–2025); TruTV (2024–2025); ESPN (2025–present); ESPN2 (2025–present); ABC (2025–present)

Shaqtin' a Fool is a weekly segment from the television show Inside the NBA, the postgame show of NBA on ESPN (previously aired for NBA on TNT) following the conclusion of National Basketball Association (NBA) games airing on cable TV channel ESPN and broadcast network ABC. The title is a play on "actin' a fool." It first aired during the 2011–12 NBA season, when retired NBA All-Star Shaquille O'Neal voiced it upon joining the show and was created by Turner Sports producer Mike Goldfarb.

== Format ==
Shaqtin' highlights humorous and uncommon basketball plays that have occurred during NBA games in the past week. O'Neal is the host and presenter, while the other analysts in studio react and provide commentary. Most often, those have been fellow Inside regulars Ernie Johnson, Kenny Smith, and Charles Barkley, but other Inside hosts have also participated, including Chris Webber, Grant Hill, Steve Smith, Kevin Garnett and Matt Winer. Since 2018, the Shaqtin franchise has been led by Turner Sports producer Michael Kaplan.

The segment regularly features NBA players and also includes, but is not limited to, coaches, referees, fans, mascots, other arena employees, and sometimes the hosts themselves. Sometimes they also air clips from other international basketball leagues. On special occasions, the segment features plays which had occurred during the past, including several entire "retro" editions. Each episode tends to have four entries (five until 2018) from the past week, with each entry typically involving a single play (although there are some times where a collection of similar bad plays, such as travels and air ball free throws, are highlighted). Multiple plays may include the same player, and a single play may highlight more than one player. Clips are usually followed by a montage of exaggerated visual gags and added sound effects, usually with the players in focus being rotoscoped and composited into additional comic environments, and often reaction shots of the coaches. NBA finals plays are not included, due to series ended to conference finals.

There is a special award given to certain players, called the "Shaqtin Golden Ticket," which is lifetime immunity from being included in the segment. Since its debut in 2015, four players have been awarded with the award. Those include: current Cleveland Cavaliers power forward Larry Nance Jr. (2015 winner), current free agent small and power forward P. J. Tucker (2016 winner, although he was featured on an episode during the 2018–19 season), 2-time Shaqtin' MVP, 3-time NBA Champion, and current NBL center JaVale McGee (after his long feud with O'Neal escalated in early 2017, see more in "Shaq's feud with JaVale McGee" section), and current Philadelphia 76ers center Joel Embiid (2018 winner, although he did appear in an episode in the 2022–23 season).

At the conclusion of the NBA postseason, a Shaqtin' a Fool special airs on NBA TV. During the special, O'Neal is joined by Ro Parrish and Dennis Scott, and the top Shaqtin' a Fool plays of the season are shown. On the 2013 special, 34 plays were shown to honor O'Neal's jersey retirement of No. 34 during his tenure with the Los Angeles Lakers. On the 2014 special, only 20 plays were shown. For the 2015 special, the number of plays increased to 30. Since the beginning of the 2013–14 NBA season, fans are able to tweet suggestions for Shaqtin' a Fool.

== Shaqtin' a Fool Most Valuable Player ==
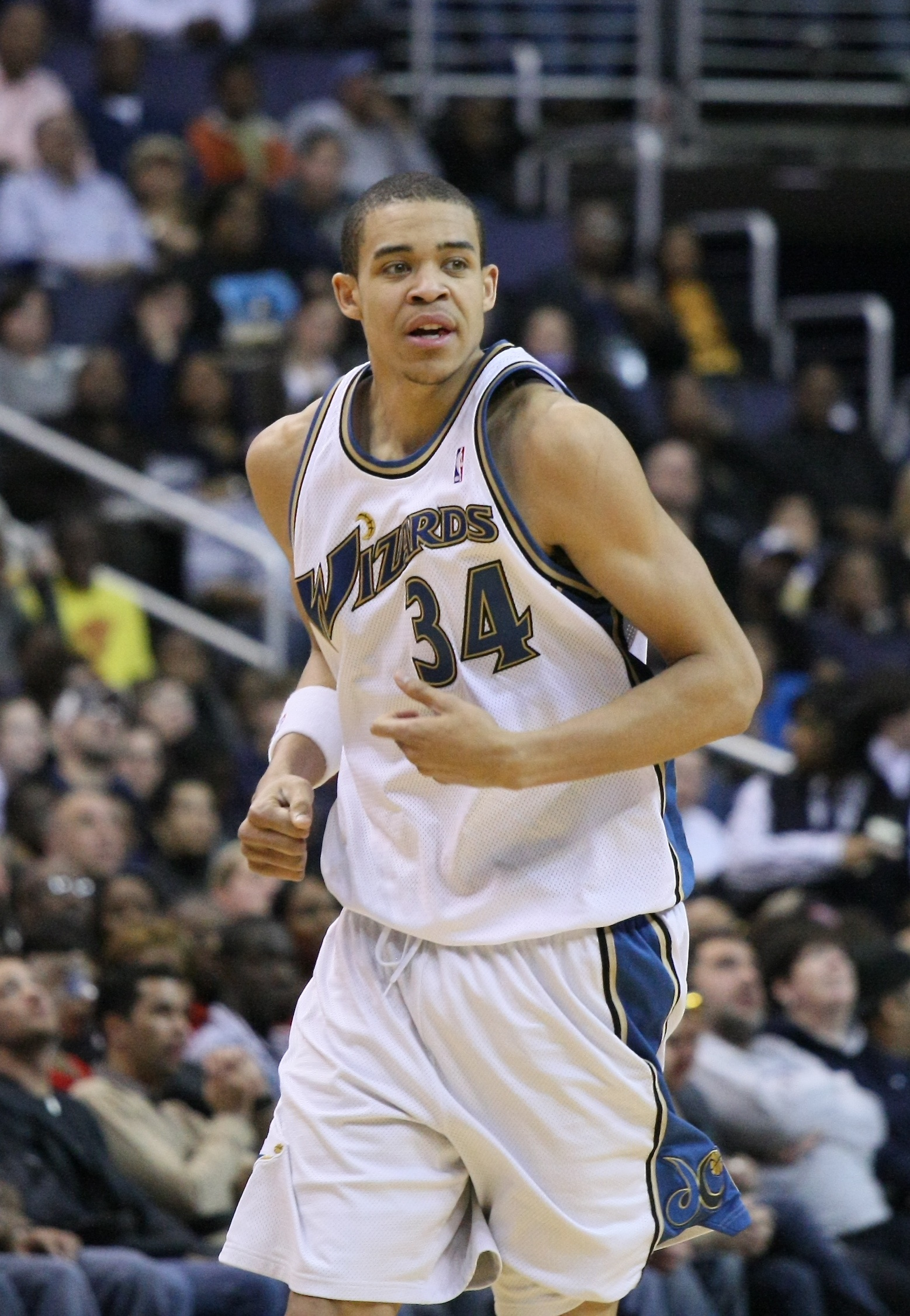
JaVale McGee is a two-time winner of the Shaqtin' a Fool MVP award.

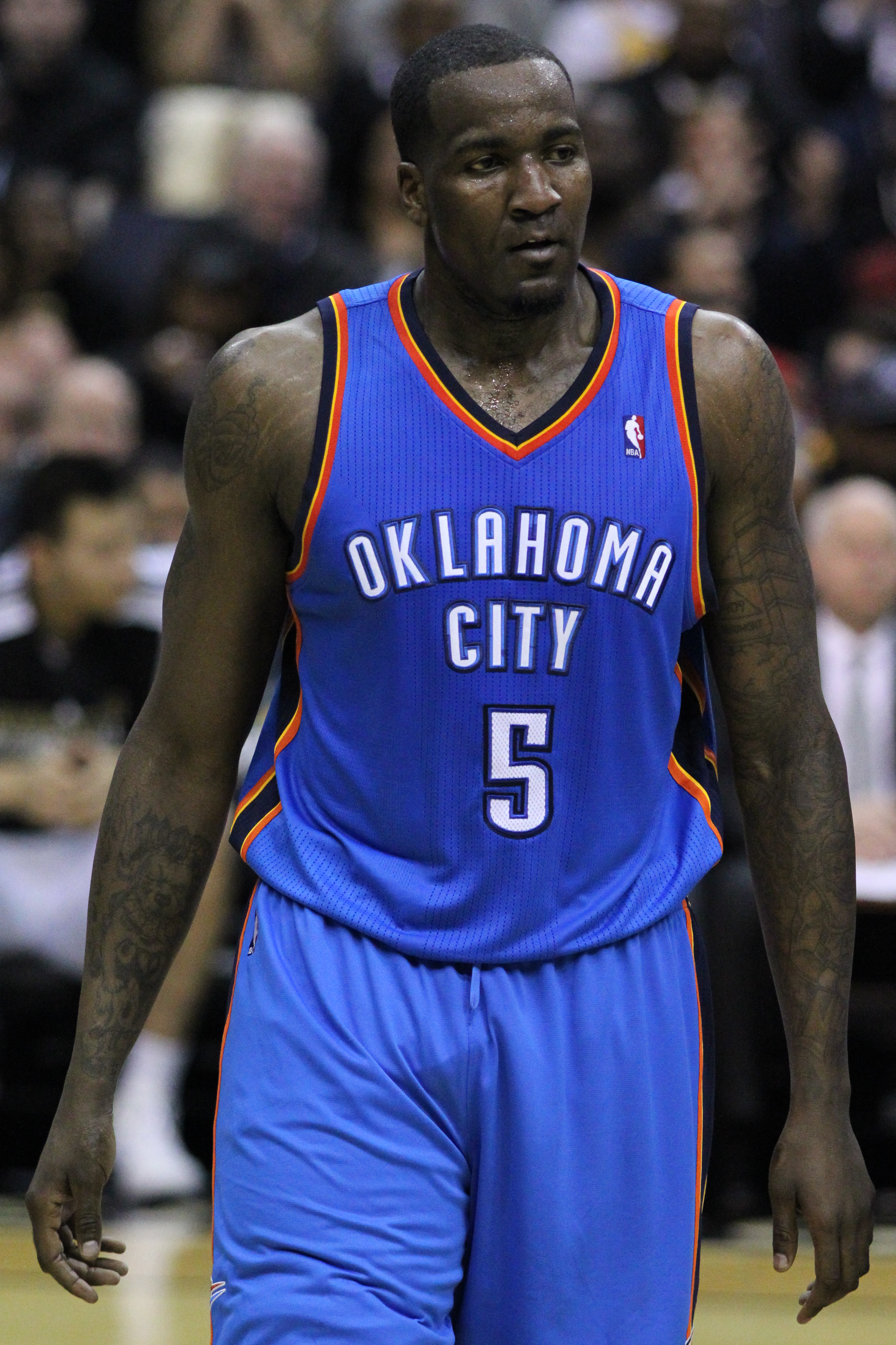
Kendrick Perkins, the 2014 Shaqtin' a Fool MVP

The Shaqtin' a Fool Most Valuable Player (MVP) is an annual award presented at the Shaqtin' a Fool special during the conclusion of the NBA Playoffs. In the 2011–12 and the 2012–13 season, fans voted online for their favorite play of the year, and whichever player whose play accumulated the most votes for that season was awarded with the Shaqtin' a Fool MVP. In the 2013–14 season, the MVP was decided through the most appearances made by one player in a single season. In the event of a tie, fans vote for a player, and the leading candidate receives the award. For the 2014–15 season, three nominees were named and fans voted online for the winner.

Season	Player	Position	Team	Notes
2011–12	JaVale McGee	Center	Washington Wizards	Traded to the Denver Nuggets before the season ended
2012–13	JaVale McGee (2)	Center	Denver Nuggets	McGee became the first of two players to win the award twice
2013–14	Kendrick Perkins	Center	Oklahoma City Thunder	Initially tied with Nick Young, fans later voted for Perkins to break the tie
2014–15	Otto Porter Jr.	Forward	Washington Wizards	Won the fan vote against Brandon Knight and Dion Waiters
2015–16	James Harden	Guard	Houston Rockets	Harden was the first All-Star to win the award.
2016–17	Russell Westbrook	Guard	Oklahoma City Thunder	Westbrook is the first player to win NBA MVP and Shaqtin' MVP in the same season.
2017–18	Joel Embiid	Center	Philadelphia 76ers	Embiid gained 58% of the fan vote against LeBron James, and it was claimed that this was the closest race to date.
2018–19	Lance Stephenson	Guard	Los Angeles Lakers	First Shaqtin' MVP under the new format, where fans voted on Twitter hours before the NBA doubleheader on TNT, then the nightly winner would be announced on Inside the NBA later that night.
2019–20	No MVP named	N/A	N/A	Season abruptly suspended from March to July 2020 due to the COVID-19 pandemic.
2020–21	Russell Westbrook (2)	Guard	Washington Wizards	
2021–22	Russell Westbrook (3)	Guard	Los Angeles Lakers	
2022–23	Andre Drummond	Center	Chicago Bulls	
2023–24	Jordan Poole	Guard	Washington Wizards	
2024–25	LeBron James	Forward	Los Angeles Lakers	

== Special editions ==
Other from the season-ending special, occasionally there are other special editions of Shaqtin' a Fool.

=== All-star edition ===
Starting with the conclusion of the 2012 All-Star Game, an "All-Star Weekend" edition of Shaqtin' a Fool airs after NBA All-Star Weekend. It highlights bloopers that had occurred in the All Star Weekend events, such as the Slam Dunk Contest, the NBA All-Star Celebrity Game, and the NBA Rising Stars Challenge.

=== Inside the NBA edition ===
The April 17th, 2013 edition of Shaqtin' was devoted to Inside, showing four moments featuring Inside cast members (including two from Charles Barkley), and one from a crew member dressed as Chris Bosh. For example, it included Johnson in a comic dunk contest as "'Elevator' Ernie Johnson".

=== Midseason awards ===
==== 2014 ====
On February 27, 2014, a midseason special named the "Shaqtin's" (parodying the Academy Awards) aired on NBA TV featuring O'Neal, Scott and Greenberg.

Award	Player	Position	Team	Reason
Worst Layup	Kendrick Perkins	Center	Oklahoma City Thunder	An up and under layup/dunk attempt fails to hit the rim.
Worst Pass	Enes Kanter	Center	Utah Jazz	A random pass out of bounds against the Thunder.
Worst Shot	Enes Kanter	Center	Utah Jazz	Two botched double-clutch jumpers.
Worst Dunk	Derrick Williams	Forward	Sacramento Kings	A missed self-alley-oop after getting a steal against the Chicago Bulls. Notable for occurring after Williams had tweeted in response to Corey Brewer's own missed dunk, which occurred earlier in the week.
Worst Moment By An All-Star	Tony Parker	Guard	San Antonio Spurs	A technical free throw shot well short of the basket. This shot attempt was aborted by the officials, possibly while Parker was in mid-shot.
Worst Turnover	Marcin Gortat	Center	Washington Wizards	A botched Dream Shake against Tim Duncan.
Worst Moment	JaVale McGee	Center	Denver Nuggets	Piggy-backing Steven Adams while running back on defense during a fast break. This would be McGee's only Shaqtin' a Fool appearance all season as he was sidelined with a broken left leg.
Lifetime Achievement Award	JaVale McGee	Center	Denver Nuggets	Two-time Shaqtin' MVP and a running gag on the show.

==== 2015 ====
For 2015, O'Neal, Scott and Greenberg were joined by Funkmaster Flex, who also presented Flexin' A Fool, reserved for players under 6 feet. Ashanti also made an appearance to put her spin on the intro.

Award	Player	Position	Team	Reason
Lifetime Achievement Award	Brandon Knight	Guard	Milwaukee Bucks	Missing an easy game-winning layup in overtime against the Brooklyn Nets. This play also nominated Knight for MVP honors.
Worst Fast Break	Brandon Knight	Guard	Milwaukee Bucks	Missing an easy game-winning layup in overtime against the Brooklyn Nets. This play also nominated Knight for MVP honors.
Worst Pass	Brandon Knight	Guard	Milwaukee Bucks	A badly botched jump pass against the Indiana Pacers.
Worst Shot	Brandon Jennings	Guard	Detroit Pistons	Passing up a wide open layup and then missing a fadeaway jumper.
Worst Dunk	Corey Brewer	Forward	Minnesota Timberwolves	A breakaway dunk that followed an uncalled six-step travel.
Worst Play By An All-Star	James Harden	Guard	Houston Rockets	Matador defense in transition against the New York Knicks.
Worst Moment	Lance Stephenson	Guard	Charlotte Hornets	Slapping himself and flopping after running into a screen.

==== 2016 ====
On February 17, 2016, Greenberg hosted the 2016 edition with O'Neal and Scott.

Award	Player	Position	Team	Reason
Worst Shot	Marcelo Huertas	Guard	Los Angeles Lakers	A behind-the-head three-pointer as the shot clock expired after getting his first shot blocked.
Worst Play By An All-Star	James Harden	Guard	Houston Rockets	Two plays in the winning nomination: matador defense in transition against the Knicks and failure to defensively rebound a missed layup by the Detroit Pistons, which surrendered a tip-in. A wildly errant pass by Harden against the Utah Jazz was featured in another nomination.
Worst Fast Break	Nerlens Noel	Center	Philadelphia 76ers	Mishandling his own dribble on a fast break after stealing the ball from the Cleveland Cavaliers.
Worst Pass	Anderson Varejão	Center	Cleveland Cavaliers	A pass that hit LeBron James in the face while receiving another pass during a pre-game warm-up.
Worst Uncalled Travel	Dirk Nowitzki	Forward	Dallas Mavericks	Uncalled backward hopping while possessing the ball and posting up against the Houston Rockets.
Worst Moment	Bismack Biyombo	Center	Toronto Raptors	Dribbled the ball after stopping his dribble, then lets the ball go loose upon realizing his mistake.
Lifetime Achievement Award	Kendrick Perkins	Center	New Orleans Pelicans	2013–14 Shaqtin' MVP.

==== 2017 ====
On February 22, 2017, Ro Parrish hosted the 2017 edition with O'Neal and Scott. In this edition, all winners except Westbrook made an on-camera "acceptance speech" (in Smith's case, Jason Terry, who was also involved in the play, spoke for him). That led to additional plays featured; another windmill dunk by Ross, this time successful (after his asking for it) and two flops O'Neal made during his career (after "Best Actor" winner Marcus Smart accepted the award but implied that O'Neal flopped some times himself as a player).

Award	Player	Position	Team	Reason
Worst Shot	Kemba Walker	Guard	Charlotte Hornets	Prematurely celebrating a 3-pointer against the Miami Heat before the shot missed.
Worst Play By An All-Star	Russell Westbrook	Guard	Oklahoma City Thunder	A blatant travel following an inbound against the Golden State Warriors.
Worst Fast Break	Terrence Ross	Guard/Forward	Toronto Raptors	A missed breakaway windmill dunk following a steal against the Milwaukee Bucks.
Worst Pass	Wesley Johnson	Guard/Forward	Los Angeles Clippers	Two consecutive botched inbounds passes against the San Antonio Spurs, resulting in easy dunks.
Best Actor (Worst Flop)	Marcus Smart	Guard	Boston Celtics	A trio of flops against the Pistons, Rockets and Pelicans.
Worst Uncalled Travel	Bojan Bogdanović	Guard/Forward	Brooklyn Nets	A 10-step travel combined with a double dribble against the Clippers.
Worst Moment	J. R. Smith	Guard	Cleveland Cavaliers	Hugging Jason Terry during play against the Bucks, leading to an easy dunk for Tony Snell.
Lifetime Achievement Award	Dwight Howard	Center/Forward	Atlanta Hawks	Various moments on the show, aggravated by his long-standing feud with O'Neal.

In addition, O'Neal's mispronouncing of players' names was featured before the Worst Fast Break was presented.

==== 2018 ====
On February 21, 2018, Casey Stern hosted the 2018 edition with O'Neal, Scott and Tony Rock. In this edition, all winners except Stephen Curry and Marcus Smart made an on-camera "acceptance speech" (in Curry's case, Lauri Markkanen, who was also involved in the play, spoke for him). O'Neal spoke on Smart's behalf and also presented a clip of him taking a seven-step travel in a 2010 playoff game.

Award	Player	Position	Team	Reason
Worst Shot	Rotnei Clarke	Guard	(Australia) Illawarra Hawks	A botched free throw attempt against the Sydney Kings.
Worst Play By An All-Star	Stephen Curry	Guard	Golden State Warriors	Lost balance, fell down and hit his head after being blocked by Lauri Markkanen on a layup attempt.
Worst Fast Break	Avery Bradley	Guard	Detroit Pistons	A missed dunk and blocked shot following a steal against the Clippers.
Worst Pass	Lance Stephenson	Guard	Indiana Pacers	A pass to Domantas Sabonis while falling down the floor against the Bucks.
Best Actor	Dirk Nowitzki	Forward	Dallas Mavericks	Falling down the other end of the court in transition against the Orlando Magic.
Worst Uncalled Travel	Marcus Smart	Guard	Boston Celtics	A 12-step travel while in possession and going for a pass against the Rockets.
Worst Moment	Joel Embiid	Center	Philadelphia 76ers	Three missed dunks against the Pacers.
Lifetime Achievement Award	Nick Young	Guard	Golden State Warriors	2013–14 Shaqtin' MVP runner-up to Kendrick Perkins, known for a premature celebration-to-missed shot against the Knicks in March 2014.

==== 2023 ====
After around 5 years on hiatus, the Shaqtin' a Fool midseason awards returned on February 21, 2023. This edition was hosted by Dennis Scott along with Shaquille O'Neal and Josiah Johnson. This award also presented some of Shaq's viral moments during the 2022–23 season in the final segment.

Award	Player	Position	Team	Reason
Worst Pass	Jalen Green	Guard	Houston Rockets	Failed to set an alley-oop to Kenyon Martin Jr. against the Philadelphia 76ers.
Worst Miss	Killian Hayes	Guard	Detroit Pistons	A shot that went over the backboard against the Memphis Grizzlies.
Worst Decision	Russell Westbrook	Guard	Los Angeles Lakers^{a}	Passed the ball to each other during a preseason game.
Worst Decision	Jaden McDaniels	Forward	Minnesota Timberwolves	Passed the ball to each other during a preseason game.
Worst Flop	Patrick Beverley	Guard	Los Angeles Lakers^{a}	Flopped after his possession was stolen by the Clippers' Terance Mann.
Worst Got 'Em	Daniel Gafford	Center	Washington Wizards	Got an ankle breaker by Kevin Durant and splitting against the Nets.
Worst Timing	D'Angelo Russell	Guard	Minnesota Timberwolves^{b}	Forgot to check into the game when the Phoenix Suns got possession.
Worst Result	Aaron Nesmith	Forward	Indiana Pacers	Got slipped when his teammates watered down on him during the post-match interview.
Worst Turnover	Josh Giddey	Guard	Oklahoma City Thunder	An inbound pass that hit the backboard and reached Shai Gilgeous-Alexander out of bounds against the Boston Celtics.
Worst What Are You Doing?	Meek Mill	Spectator		Tripped the referee when watching the 76ers against the Suns.

Notes

- ^{a}: These moments happened when Russell Westbrook and Patrick Beverley played for the Los Angeles Lakers.
- ^{b}: This moment happened when D'Angelo Russell played for the Minnesota Timberwolves.

=== "Old School" Edition (2014) ===
On December 11, 2014, a special edition of Shaqtin' a Fool, titled "Old School", featured plays which occurred during the 1980s, 90s, 2000s, and a special section showing O'Neal's top bloopers during his career as a player. This edition ran on NBA TV, and showed 5 plays for each category, totaling to 20 plays.

Category	Players Featured
1980s	Larry Bird, Darryl Dawkins, Kareem Abdul-Jabbar, Danny Ainge, and Karl Malone
1990s	Tim Kempton, Dominique Wilkins, Michael Jordan, Chris Mills, Samaki Walker, and Shawn Marion
2000s	Lamar Odom, Nick Buchert, JaVale McGee, Shaquille O'Neal, and Michael Ruffin
Shaquille O'Neal	Shaquille O'Neal

[1] Walker was included in the same play as Mills

[2] Buchert is an NBA referee

=== NBA Countdown Edition (2023) ===
On December 7, 2023, Inside joined forces with ESPN's NBA Countdown studio team of Stephen A. Smith, Michael Wilbon, Malika Andrews, Adrian Wojnarowski and Bob Myers as part of a TNT-ESPN collaboration to broadcast and cover the 2023 (inaugural) NBA In-Season Tournament semifinals at T-Mobile Arena in Las Vegas. This involved both studio teams appearing on the other show and network for pre- and post-game coverage, including Smith and Wilbon appearing on Inside. The Shaqtin' edition for the episode was themed around Smith and Wilbon, including Smith bouncing a first pitch at Yankee Stadium as #1.

== Shaq's feud with JaVale McGee ==
The player who was featured most frequently on the show was JaVale McGee, who "won" MVP honors in the first two seasons and was firstly featured on the second episode of the 2011–12 season. McGee's growing displeasure over his frequent appearances culminated into a heated argument between him and Shaquille O'Neal on February 24, 2017, with tweets exchanged between the two. During the following show, O'Neal declared that the feud was over and McGee's name would "never come out of his mouth again". During the last show of the 2016–17 regular season, when the best plays of the season were selected, a co-host tried to ask O'Neal if there was a chance that any of McGee's plays already shown at the show before the feud would be featured, but O'Neal immediately dismissed the possibility. Since the feud, McGee's former team, the Golden State Warriors, had requested TNT, the network airing the segment, to cease mentions of McGee.

McGee explained further to Shannon Sharpe on his podcast Club Shay Shay in 2021:

At the time when it was happening, I wasn't in a position to really speak on it to where it would get any push if I would've spoke on it early on. I didn't realize what it was doing to my career until I started to move onto other teams. It was slowly chipping away at my reputation. Perception changes everything. All I have been doing is trying to build my reputation back up.

In an interview with his former teammate Draymond Green on his podcast in 2023, he also explained his frustrations about being frequently shown on the segment:

I could watch an episode. A lot of people tag you for everything. This is it bro. I'm not going for this shit no more. The fact that you keep putting this narrative out there about me? At that point I just didn't understand why I need to be the butt of his jokes.
