= Inside the NBA =

Postgame show for NBA on ESPN broadcasts

- Presented by: Ernie Johnson Jr.
- Starring: Shaquille O'Neal; Kenny Smith; Charles Barkley
- Country of origin: United States

Production
- Production locations: Ted Turner Campus, TNT Sports Studio J, Atlanta, Georgia
- Running time: 30–60 minutes
- Production company: TNT Sports

Original release
- Network: TNT (1989–2025); TBS (1989–2002 and 2015–2025; regular season and simulcasts); TruTV (2024–2025; simulcasts); NBA TV (2003–2025)
- Release: November 4, 1989 – May 31, 2025
- Network: ABC; ESPN; ESPN2; ESPN DTC; ESPN Deportes (Spanish audio/broadcast)
- Release: October 22, 2025 – present

Related
- NBA Countdown; NBA on ABC; NBA on ESPN; NBA on TNT; NBA on TBS

Inside the NBA is a halftime and postgame studio show for selected NBA on ESPN broadcasts, having previously aired for NBA on TNT broadcasts from 1989 to 2025. The show has been hosted since 1990 by Ernie Johnson, joined on set by three analysts: Kenny Smith (since 1998), Charles Barkley (since 2000), and Shaquille O'Neal (since 2011). Notable former analysts have included Magic Johnson (2003–2007), Reggie Miller (2008–2011), and Chris Webber (2008–2011).

Since the early 2000s, the show has consistently been rated as among the best sports analysis shows on American television, and over its history has won nineteen Sports Emmy Awards. From the 2025–26 season onwards, the show (along with the pregame edition NBA Tip-Off) airs on selected ABC and ESPN broadcasts, as part of a sub-licensing agreement between parent companies the Walt Disney Company and Skydance Corporation, with the program being produced by Warner Bros. Television Studios under the TNT Sports brand.

== History ==
=== TNT (1989–2025) ===
Former title card in 2016

Inside the NBA debuted after TNT acquired the rights to broadcast NBA games during the 1989–90 season. In its first season, there were no permanent hosts or analysts. Craig Sager, Hannah Storm, Vince Cellini, Tim Brando and Fred Hickman shared hosting duties at various points of the season. In the following season, Ernie Johnson Jr., formerly a sideline reporter, took over as the show's full-time host, a role he retains to this day.

Initially, Inside the NBA focused on recaps of the day's games. Occasionally, Johnson invited a former or current NBA player or coach to sit in as a guest analyst. Kenny Smith joined Johnson full-time in 1998.

Newly-retired former NBA All-Star Charles Barkley joined TNT in 2000 and became notorious for his bold, and at times controversial, statements on the air.

In late 2002, Barkley told Kenny Smith that he would "kiss [his] ass" if Houston Rockets then-rookie Yao Ming scored 19 points in a game, which was followed by Yao doing exactly that later that week. As a result, on Listen Up! With Charles Barkley and Ernie Johnson that Thursday, Barkley kissed the rear end of a donkey that Smith brought into the studio. In 2002, a controversial Sports Illustrated cover, in which Barkley was portrayed in chains (as a slave), led to a debate between Smith and Barkley about the merits of the cover.

During the 2000s, TNT added a third analyst alongside Smith and Barkley. Hall of Famer Magic Johnson served as the third analyst between 2003 and 2007, and Reggie Miller and Chris Webber split the role between 2008 and 2011.

Before the 2011–12 season, TNT hired Shaquille O'Neal as a studio analyst. O'Neal's addition led Inside the NBA to add the Shaqtin' a Fool segment, featuring bloopers from around the league.

During the 2020, 2021, and 2024 playoffs, Golden State Warriors forward Draymond Green made occasional appearances on Inside the NBA. In 2022, Green was added to TNT's analyst roster, and would contribute occasionally on the show while still an active player.

The popularity of the program has led the NBA to air reruns of the show (as well as reruns of other TNT NBA studio programs, NBA Tip-Off, the American Express Halftime Report and Game Break) on the TNT Overtime on NBA.com. Analysts from the show, with the notable exception of Barkley, have been featured in the popular NBA 2K video game series beginning with NBA 2K15. Beginning in 2011, the team has also covered the NCAA Division I men's basketball tournament as CBS began partnering with Turner for NCAA March Madness.

During the 2021–22 season, Inside the NBA aired after TNT Tuesday games during the NFL regular season and on Thursday nights once football season ends. TNT moved its marquee games to Tuesday in the fall and early winter in order to avoid competition with Thursday Night Football. The postgame shows after TNT Tuesday games, beginning in January, were rebranded as the NBA on TNT Postgame Show, with Adam Lefkoe as host and analysts O'Neal, Candace Parker and Dwyane Wade.

Wade decided not to return to NBA on TNT coverage for the 2022–23 season, choosing to focus on other business interests. Jamal Crawford replaced Wade as an analyst on NBA on TNT Tuesdays.

Prior to the 2022–23 season, Warner Bros. Discovery Sports announced contract renewals for all four of the main Inside the NBA panelists, including a 10-year extension for Barkley that he called "a life-altering deal".

=== ESPN/ABC (2025–present) ===
Promotional image for the ESPN era of Inside the NBA

On July 24, 2024, the NBA announced new 11-year broadcasting agreements with ABC/ESPN, NBC, and Amazon Prime Video. TNT parent company Warner Bros. Discovery (WBD) attempted to use its backend rights to match the offer made by Amazon, but it was rejected on the basis that WBD did not match the terms offered by Amazon. On July 26, WBD filed its lawsuit against the league in New York state court, seeking to delay the NBA's new 2025 media deals from taking effect and to rule that TNT's offer matched Amazon's deal.

Both parties reached a settlement on November 18, which included an agreement for ESPN to pick up Inside the NBA in conjunction with its own NBA coverage; the program would continue to be produced by TNT Sports from its studios in Atlanta, with no changes in personnel.

The final edition of Inside the NBA on TNT was broadcast on May 31, 2025, following Game 6 of the Eastern Conference finals. During the final sign-off, Johnson said:

If I had written the script, the NBA and TNT would be together forever. It's not going to happen, but while I was disappointed, I was sad, I was not bitter. We know how business works. Gratitude is the operative word for me. [ ... ] So thank you, we have been honored to do this. [ ... ] But I'm proud to say for the last time, thanks for watching us. It's the NBA on TNT.

O'Neal and Smith dropped f-bombs during their TNT sign-off, with O'Neal saying:

We're a family. I'm glad we're sticking together. And like I said, even though the name changes, the engine is still the same. And to that new network we're coming to, we not coming to eff around. Since this is the last show, I'm going to say it—we not coming to fuck around.

ESPN announced prior to the 2025–26 season that NBA Tip-Off, halftime coverage, and Inside the NBA would air as part of 20 NBA broadcasts on ESPN and ABC throughout the regular season (with ESPN's own studio show NBA Countdown airing for all other games), beginning with its season-opening doubleheaders on October 22 and 23, and two Wednesday broadcasts on October 29 and November 12, followed by ABC and ESPN's Christmas games. It would then return for selected NBA Saturday Primetime, NBA Sunday Showcase, and ESPN weeknight doubleheaders beginning January 24. Inside the NBA during Saturday Primetime would begin on ABC before moving to the ESPN app for late local news, while only NBA Tip-Off would air for Sunday Showcase. Inside the NBA would air throughout ESPN's coverage of the NBA playoffs, and broadcast from the NBA Finals for the first time in the program's history. The limited number of broadcasts was prompted by TNT Sports, which had been pursuing the development of a new mainstream sports show featuring the Inside the NBA panel; while ESPN "wasn't thrilled" by the decision, it did agree to put most of their broadcasts during the second half of the season to compensate.

ESPN assured that the show would remain relatively unchanged with the move from TNT, with no changes to personnel or format, and also maintaining the exact same on-air presentation and studio with few changes (aside from a rebranding to replace the TNT logo with the ESPN logo where applicable). Its panel has also made self-deprecating jokes regarding the move on-air; during the ESPN premiere, a comedy gag featured Barkley showing a mock schedule of planned appearances on other ESPN shows that included the American Cornhole League and World Axe Throwing League, and a later episode featured a segment mocking ESPN's perceived overemphasis on the Dallas Cowboys in its NFL programming.

On October 28, 2026, Johnson announced that he would step down from Inside the NBA following the end of the 2026–27 season, but not as a broadcaster.

== Recurring segments ==
"Shaqtin' a Fool" is a blooper segment started by O'Neal when he joined the show in 2011 that has become popular since. The segment uses CGI to highlight on-court blunders and mistakes from games around the league. Frequent nominees include JaVale McGee, Kendrick Perkins, Nick Young, Otto Porter, Brandon Knight and Jordan Poole, although even All-Stars like LeBron James, Blake Griffin, James Harden, Andre Drummond and Russell Westbrook have been featured.

"Watch Ya Head" is a dunk segment hosted by O'Neal that was introduced when the show moved to ESPN. Every week, O'Neal selects his favorite poster dunks during the week, to which he shouts "1, 2, 3" and the crew replies back with "Watch Ya Head!".

"EJ's Neat-O Stat of the Night" is the traditional ending segment, sometimes noted for its lack of continued sponsorship ("Presented by NO ONE – Unsullied by sponsorship since 1989"), although Dave & Buster's, Taco Bell, Jim Beam, CarMax, JBL, HP, and EA Sports have sponsored it in the past. It can sometimes feature interesting or humorous stats, but the segment is sometimes used for a comedy sketch. Malika Andrews borrowed the name while appearing on Tip-Off part of the Inside collaboration with NBA Countdown during the 2023 NBA In-Season Tournament semifinals and received Johnson's blessing to use the name.

"Who He Play For?" is a start-of-season customary game where Barkley is challenged to name the new teams of a number of NBA journeymen who, perhaps (un)notably, switched teams in the offseason. Stephen A. Smith also played it while appearing on the show as part of the Inside collaboration with NBA Countdown during the 2023 NBA In-Season Tournament semifinals. Additionally, there have been several variations of the game including "How You Say That?", "Who Did He Play For?", "Who He Broadcast For?" (which dealt with NBA commentators amid the change in national broadcast partners), and "Who He Skate For?" (an NHL-themed version Barkley attempted to conduct with the panel).

"This Week in the NBA" is a recap show of key parts during the season that happen when the show doesn't air. Introduced when the show moved to ESPN, producers Matt "Scoop" Dagostino and Alex Houvouras take viewers across the NBA in a black-and-white film-type highlight and lowlight reel.

"Gone Fishin" is a segment aired whenever a team is knocked out of the playoffs (or a team failed to make the playoffs), and is usually accompanied by doctored photos of players on the team, and notable figures from the team's home city, on fishing boats with analyst Kenny Smith. It has its roots in the 1990s; when the Suns had a chance to eliminate a team, their gorilla mascot would hold a fishing pole to indicate the opponents would be "gone fishin'". The catchphrase has its own page on NBA.com and has also become a metaphor for being eliminated from the playoffs. MLB on TBS uses a similar phrase for when a team gets knocked out of the postseason, called "Gone Huntin", as most North American hunting seasons occur in mid-to-late fall. The NHL on TNT uses a similar phrase for when a team gets knocked out of the postseason, called "Gone Golfin", as most golfing in North America occurs in early-to-late summer.

=== Former segments ===
"Area 21" was a segment hosted by Kevin Garnett, who joined the show following his retirement before the 2016–17 season. Noted for being more informal and by the presence of a "cuss button" for when Garnett or a guest wants to swear, which has sometimes been left unused.

"Audio Toons" are old conversations and past events, animated by Cartoon Network.

"Players Only" was the name given to the Monday edition between 2017 and 2019, reserved for players-turned-analysts such as Webber, O'Neal, Garnett, Isiah Thomas, Chris Bosh and Baron Davis. WNBA players such as Lisa Leslie and Candace Parker would sit in as analysts for these broadcasts.

== Notable moments ==
Some segments of Inside have become famous and are sometimes referenced in callbacks on other episodes, or in other media.

=== Barkley's race with Dick Bavetta ===
While filling in for an injured Steve Kerr on a Los Angeles Lakers-Sacramento Kings broadcast, Charles Barkley made disparaging comments about the age of referee Dick Bavetta. The conversation between Barkley and play-by-play man Marv Albert eventually led him to comment that he could outrun Bavetta, and any other man of his age (Bavetta was 67 at the time).

This led Johnson and Smith to note that Bavetta, a physically fit referee whose job required him to run up and down the court on a nightly basis, would likely beat Barkley (who had become woefully out of shape compared to his playing career) in a race. Bavetta challenged Barkley to a footrace, which was then scheduled for the upcoming 2007 All-Star Weekend.

The race was heavily hyped on the Internet, receiving some mainstream attention as well. Several NBA players weighed in with predictions, and the overwhelming majority picked Bavetta to win the race.

Despite being the underdog, Barkley won the race by a comfortable margin. Both men ended up falling after the race; Bavetta dove for the finish line, and Barkley stumbled backwards and fell upon victory. With the race decided, the two exchanged a friendly hug and kiss. The race raised $50,000 for charity, and All-Star Saturday Night on TNT drew its highest number of television households in its twenty-two-year history.

=== Barkley's beef with Oakland ===
During the 2007 NBA Playoffs, following the Golden State Warriors' upset of the Dallas Mavericks, Barkley made some degrading comments about Oakland, California, saying things such as "it makes me mad, mad that they're in Golden State and not LA" and "it's not a city". In response, the scoreboard at the Oracle Arena began showing a graphic of the Warriors' mascot throwing a pie at Barkley.

Oakland native and NBA legend Gary Payton, in his trademark competitive, trash-talking style, went around Oakland with a video camera to rebuke some of Barkley's comments and get some of the locals' opinions on Barkley and his comments, with Payton providing some of his own comments about "Sir Charles" and providing quips such as "It ain't no thrift store, it's Oakland". The humorous segment, which also included embarrassing vintage coverage of Barkley being dunked on in a game against Golden State, aired during Inside the NBA's playoff coverage of the series between the Warriors and the Utah Jazz. The clip culminated with a shot of Payton standing in front of the San Francisco Bay saying "How do you feel about my city now, Chuck? ... Now, come see me, in person, here. I've got a surprise for you, too, a lot of Krispy Kreme donuts." The humorous controversy was subsequently put to rest.

=== Barkley's beef with San Antonio ===
A frequent joke that Barkley has used throughout his run on the show involves a myriad of comments about the city of San Antonio since the 2004–05 NBA season.

The most notable comment Barkley's made is about the women in San Antonio and how they are overweight. His typical comment is about the "big-ass/big-ol' women down there," how he looks skinny compared to them, and how the women are probably eating too many churros. Smith will sometimes set up the joke by asking Barkley what he thinks about the women in San Antonio. In a notable response to his comments during the 2014 Western Conference Finals, several women, including Tim Duncan's partner Vanessa Macias, wore shirts mocking Barkley. Barkley responded by saying that they must have flown them in from Dallas or Houston. In 2022, Barkley gave a fake apology on the show to the city of San Antonio after finally having churros and seeing what the excitement was about.

Barkley has also joked about the San Antonio River Walk, a key pedestrian walkway and park that runs through the downtown area. Barkley mocks it as a "dirty little creek," saying it can't be a river since there are no fish in it.

Barkley also comments on the heat in San Antonio. During coverage of the 2014 NBA Finals on Gametime on NBA TV, when asked why he wasn't there for Game 1 of the series, he replied that it was simply too hot. He then brought out a bucket that had a piece of paper taped to it saying "San Antonio Air Conditioning Fund".

=== Smith's solidarity with the players' boycott in 2020 ===
In response to the shooting of Jacob Blake in Kenosha, Wisconsin, the Milwaukee Bucks boycotted Game 5 of their series against the Orlando Magic on August 26. Later that day, the NBA announced that in light of the Bucks' decision, all games for the day were postponed. In support for the players boycott, Kenny Smith walked out of the set while the show was aired live. "I think the biggest thing now — as a Black man and a former player — I think it's best for me to not be here tonight," Smith said.

=== ESPN In-Season Tournament collaboration ===
Ahead of the knockout stage of the 2023 (inaugural) NBA In-Season Tournament, it was announced that TNT and ESPN would collaborate on coverage involving both their commentary and their pregame and postgame coverage. As part of this, the Inside cast collaborated with their professional counterparts from NBA Countdown – Malika Andrews, Stephen A. Smith, Michael Wilbon, Bob Myers and Adrian Wojnarowski – involving Johnson, Kenny Smith, Barkley and O'Neal appearing on Countdown while Andrews, Stephen A. Smith, Wilbon and Myers also appeared on Tip-Off and Stephen A. Smith and Wilbon appeared on Inside. This would end up becoming the prequel to the handling of Inside the NBA when TNT's contract ends after the 2024-25 season.

Countdown cast members featured in a number of traditional Inside recurring segments as a result:

- Andrews borrowing Johnson's Neat-O Stat of the Night on Tip-Off and receiving Johnson's blessing to use the name.
- A special edition of Shaqtin' a Fool themed around Stephen A. Smith and Wilbon.
- Stephen A. Smith playing Who He Play For?

Inside and Countdown collaborated again the next season. This time, Stephen A. Smith joined the Inside crew during their pregame for a friendly three point and free throw contest against O'Neal and Kenny Smith. Then later that night, the Inside crew appeared on Countdown for a segment and game of "Who Said That?".

== Reception ==
Inside, since Barkley joined the show during the 2000–01 season, has become a particularly popular show due to its combination of league highlights with unscripted banter among the panelists. Bill Simmons of ESPN.com wrote in May 2002, when Johnson, Smith, and Barkley made up the core panel, that Inside was "the greatest TV studio show I've seen." Simmons observed, "A postgame show that occasionally improves on the ratings from the actual game? How rare is that?" In 2014, the New York Times described Inside as "one of the most freewheeling, unpredictable and funny talk shows on television." The "On Comedy" columnist described O'Neal as the "weak link" but generally praised the interplay between the panelists in ways that often veer far from discussions of basketball games.

Commentators have praised Inside the NBA for its panelists' willingness to have serious conversations when circumstances demand them. The panel's comments about the 2016 presidential election, particularly Johnson's, were praised in national media. Kenny Smith's solidarity with social justice protests in 2020 was described as "impactful" by a columnist for Sportscasting. "The outpouring of well wishes for Johnson and his family has shown that there may not be a more beloved person in sports media," wrote Jimmy Traina in Sports Illustrated in an article about the panel's public support for Johnson on Inside after his son Michael died. Johnson used his Twitter account and his appearance on Inside the following week to gratefully acknowledge the support he received from his coworkers and from the public.

=== Awards ===
As of 2024, the show has won nineteen Sports Emmy Awards. Six times for the best daily show (2002, 2006, 2007, 2008, 2009, 2014), six times for the best weekly show (2012, 2014, 2019, 2020, 2021, 2022), five times for the best weekly show – limited run : playoffs (2019, 2021, 2022, 2023, 2024), one for the best decoration and art visuals (2016) and one for the best social TV experience (2019). Johnson has also won eight awards as a studio host (2001, 2006, 2014, 2018, 2019, 2020, 2024, 2025) and Barkley has won six as a studio analyst (2011, 2012, 2016, 2020, 2024, 2025).

Inside was inducted into the Broadcasting & Cable Hall of Fame in October 2016, becoming the 12th program to receive the honor and the third sports show after SportsCenter and Monday Night Football. They were also honored by the Naismith Memorial Basketball Hall of Fame in 2020, becoming the first NBA telecast to win the Curt Gowdy Media Award.

== Related shows ==
Outside the NBA is a show on Facebook Watch that debuted on October 20, 2017. The same panel as on Inside talks about subjects outside of the NBA.

TNT aired The Inside Story, a four-part miniseries documenting Inside the NBA, during the NBA All-Star Break in March 2021. Each episode focused on one core panelist. The miniseries was nominated for a Sports Emmy Award for Outstanding Documentary Series at the 43rd Sports Emmy Awards.

The Steam Room is a video podcast hosted on YouTube starring Johnson and Barkley, named after a running joke from Inside. The podcast primarily consists of interviews and interactions with celebrities that are friends of Barkley and Johnson, sports media personalities, former NBA legends, comedians, and staff members.

== Personalities ==
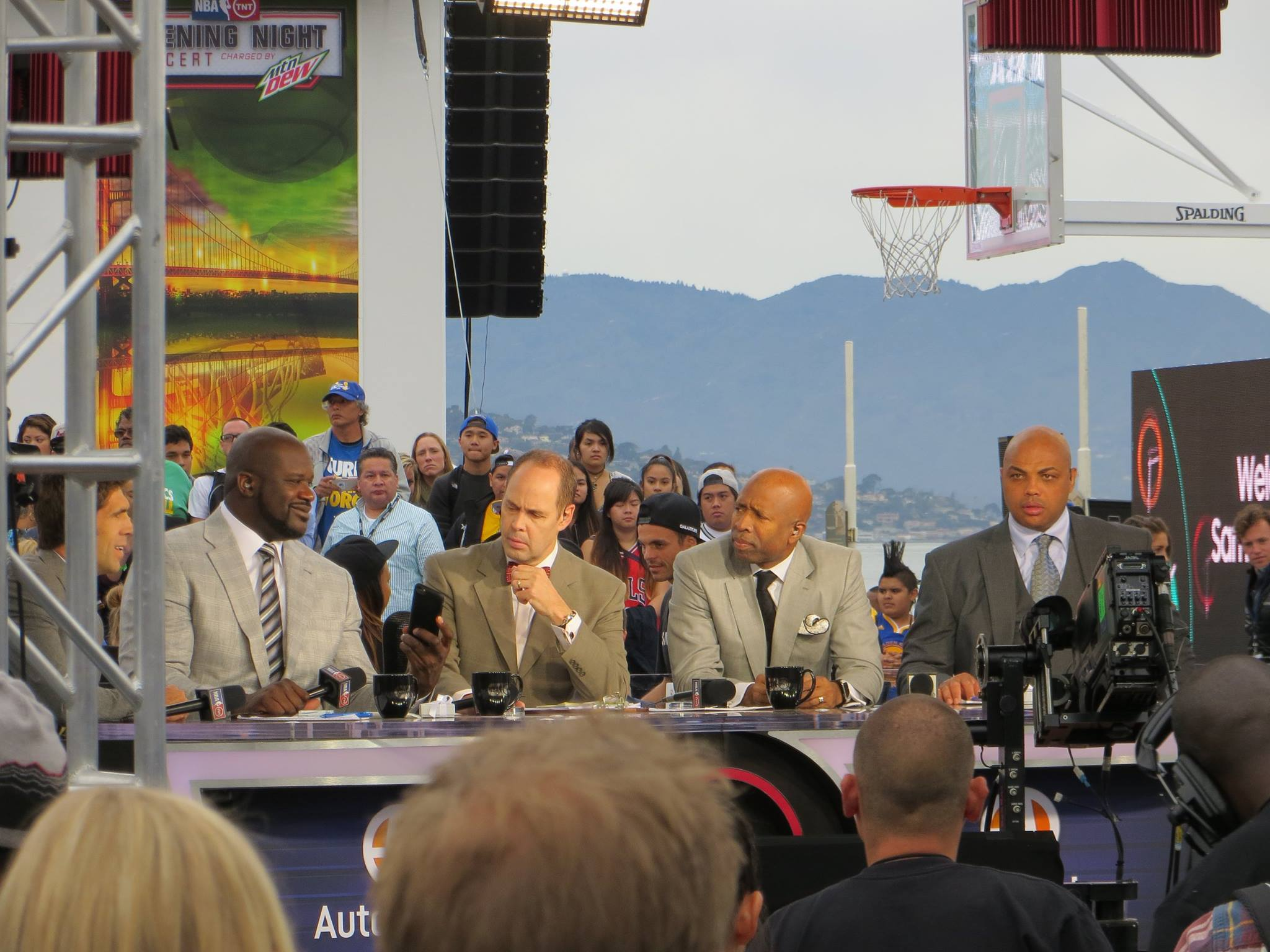
The Inside the NBA crew on location at San Francisco's Pier 43 for the NBA season opening day in late October 2015. From left to right: O'Neal, Johnson, Smith, and Barkley.

=== Current ===
==== Inside the NBA ====
- Ernie Johnson – lead studio host
- Shaquille O'Neal – analyst and Shaqtin' a Fool Presenter
- Kenny Smith – analyst
- Charles Barkley – analyst
- Chris Webber – fill-in guest analyst
- Jalen Rose – fill-in guest analyst
- Draymond Green – fill-in guest analyst

=== Former ===
- Marc Fein – fill-in studio host
- Kevin Frazier – fill-in studio host
- Magic Johnson – analyst
- Jim Huber – contributor
- Bob Lorenz – fill in host
- Kevin McHale – analyst
- Gary Payton – analyst
- Steve Kerr – analyst
- Reggie Theus – analyst
- Peter Vecsey – analyst
- Cheryl Miller – interviewer
- David Aldridge – contributor
- Casey Stern – fill-in host
- Dwyane Wade – analyst
- Jamal Crawford – analyst
- Adam Lefkoe – fill-in host
- Candace Parker – fill-in analyst
- Grant Hill – fill-in analyst
- Vince Carter – fill-in analyst

==== NBA on TNT Tuesday ====
- Adam Lefkoe – Host
- Shaquille O'Neal – analyst
- Candace Parker – analyst
- Vince Carter – analyst

== Theme music ==
The current theme song, composed by former guitarist of the progressive rock band Yes, Trevor Rabin, has been used since the 2002–2003 season.
