= Fort Mason =

- San Francisco Port of Embarkation, US Army
- U.S. National Register of Historic Places
- U.S. National Historic Landmark District
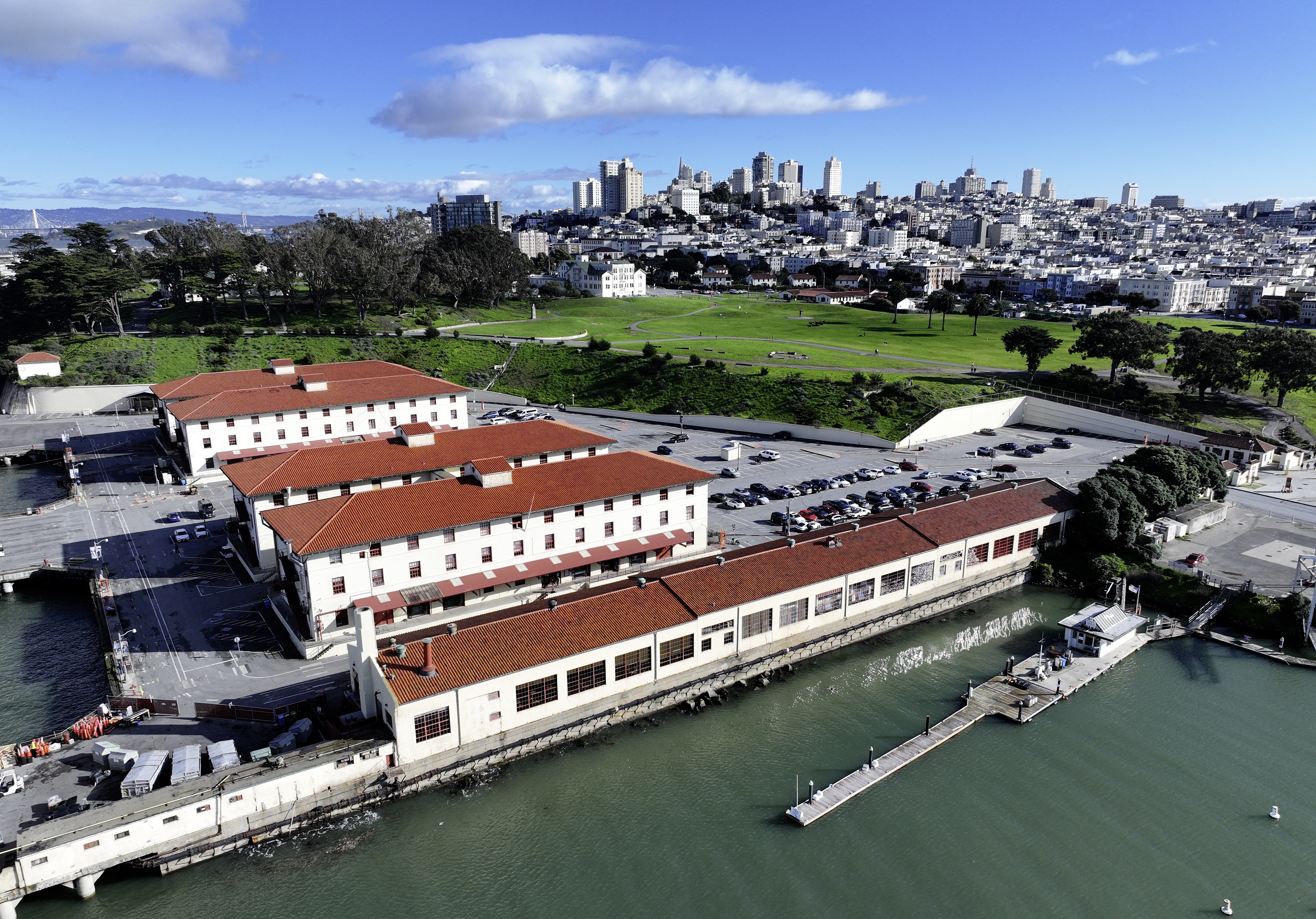
- Fort Mason in 2025

- Location within San Francisco Location within California Location within the United States
- Location: San Francisco, California
- Coordinates: 37°48′28″N 122°25′47″W
- Area: 21 acres (8.5 ha) (landmarked area)
- Built: 1912
- NRHP reference No.: 85002433

Significant dates
- Added to NRHP: February 4, 1985
- Designated NHLD: February 4, 1985

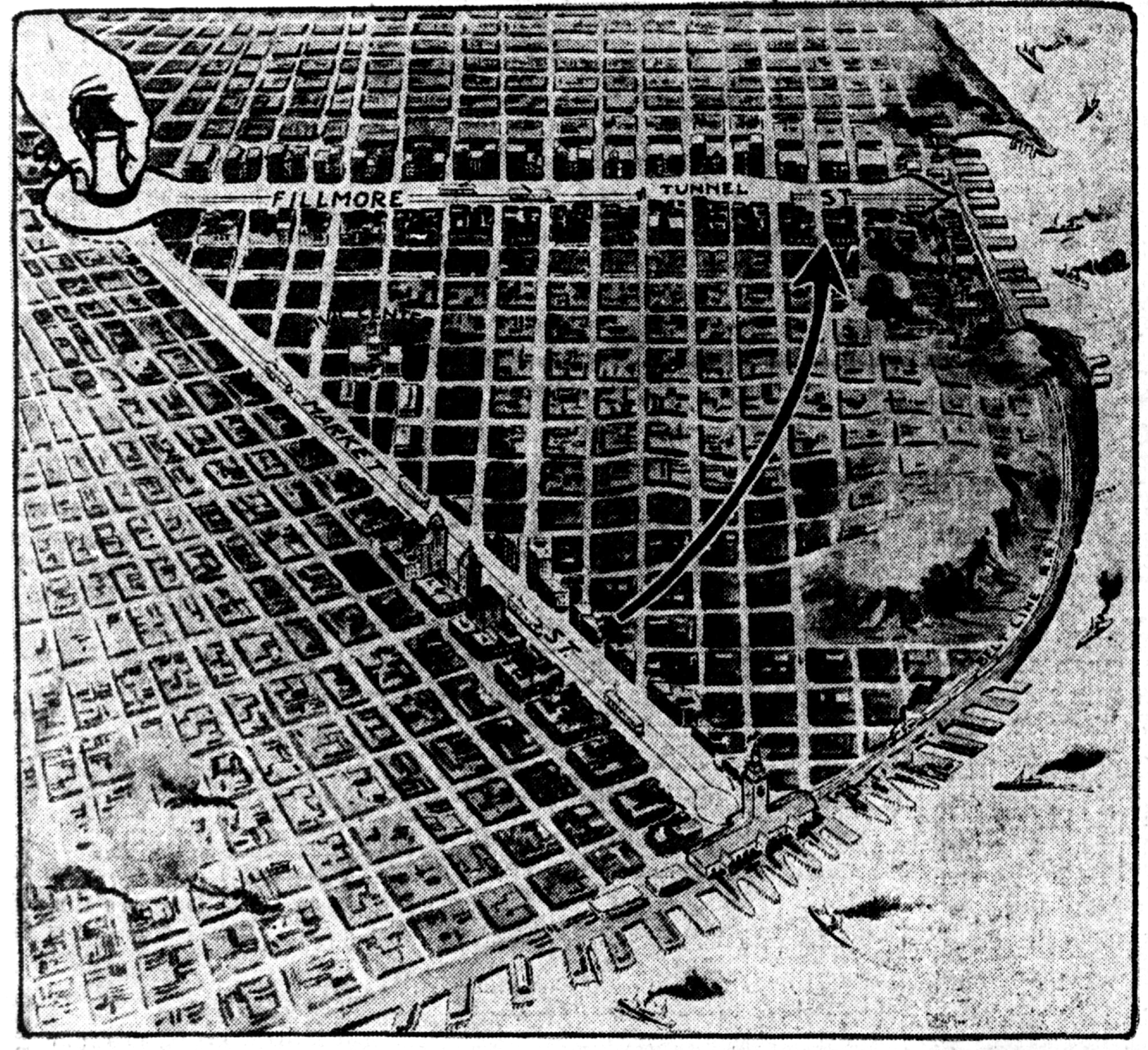
Diagram showing Fort Mason, Marina District and Western Addition, 1913

Fort Mason, in San Francisco, California is a former United States Army post located in the northern Marina District, alongside San Francisco Bay. Fort Mason served as an Army post for more than 100 years, initially as a coastal defense site and subsequently as a military port facility. During World War II, it was the principal port for the Pacific campaign.

Fort Mason originated as a coastal defense site during the American Civil War. The nucleus of the property was owned by John C. Frémont and disputes over compensation by the United States continued into 1968. In 1882 the defenses were named for Richard Barnes Mason, a military governor before statehood. Fort Mason became the headquarters for an Army command that included California and the Hawaiian Islands from 1904 to 1907. In 1912 the Army began building a port facility with piers and warehouses to be a home base for ships of the Army Transport Service serving Alaska, Hawaii, the Philippines and other Pacific Army posts and focus of Army supply for the Pacific.

On 6 May 1932, that port facility was designated the San Francisco Port of Embarkation, to serve the Pacific, It was modeled on the New York Port of Embarkation, which supplied U.S. Army forces in World War I. Fort Mason then became both the headquarters of the command that was the San Francisco Port of Embarkation and an element of that command. The San Francisco Port of Embarkation assumed responsibility for the Army Transport Service, the San Francisco General Quartermaster Depot at Fort Mason, and the Overseas Replacement and Discharge Service at Fort McDowell, California. When war came to Europe in 1939, the New York Port of Embarkation was again operating as a port of embarkation on a World War I scale, with associated camps and facilities and sub-ports soon to be established. On the Pacific, only the port at San Francisco was operating. The Army recognized that the relatively small port facility at Fort Mason was inadequate for supporting major wartime operations in the Pacific. In early 1941, the Army began acquiring land and facilities for major expansion in Oakland, Seattle and elsewhere in the San Francisco area. By the end of the war, Fort Mason and thirteen other facilities composed the San Francisco Port of Embarkation.

The San Francisco Port of Embarkation was the second largest of eight Ports of Embarkation through World War II. It was disestablished 1 October 1955, and then became headquarters for the Pacific Transportation Terminal Command.

Today, it is part of the Golden Gate National Recreation Area and the site of several cultural facilities. The entire fort area is listed as a historic district on the National Register of Historic Places, with 49 buildings of historic significance, spread over 1,200 acres (490 ha), while the lower port area is a National Historic Landmark District, designated for its role in World War II.

== Geography ==
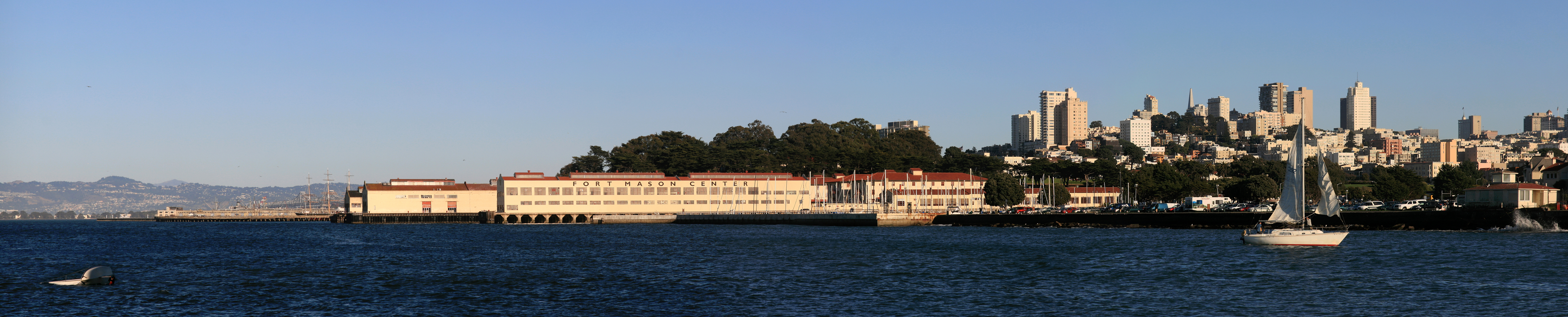
Fort Mason Center (foreground), with the Oakland hills visible to the left, and San Francisco's Russian Hill neighborhood visible to the right.

Fort Mason can be split into two distinct areas. The upper area, sometimes called Fort Mason, is situated on a headland and was the site of the original coastal fortifications. The lower area, Fort Mason Center, is situated close to water level to the west of Upper Fort Mason, and is the site of the former military port, with its piers and warehouses. The Marina Green lies to the west of Fort Mason, while Aquatic Park is to the east.

=== Black Point ===
Black Point, a promontory point of the San Francisco coastline, is situated on the far point of the headland of Fort Mason. Originally named Punta Medanos and Punta de San José by the Spanish settlers, it was renamed Black Point after 1849. Black Point was named for the abundance of dark-colored California bay laurel trees that grew on the bluff. The shoreline of Black Point is the last remaining section of original coastline in San Francisco east of the Golden Gate Bridge.

== History ==
=== Spanish and Mexican eras ===
In 1797, the Spanish Presidio of San Francisco constructed the Bateria de Yerba Buena at Punta Medanos (now called Black Point) as an artillery battery to provide additional protection to the Yerba Buena anchorage. The site was only briefly occupied and was abandoned by 1806.

=== Private ownership by John C. Frémont ===
The nucleus of Fort Mason was a private property owned by John C. Frémont, the explorer of the western U.S., who also spearheaded the conquest of California from Mexico, and ran as the first presidential nominee of the extant Republican Party in 1856. As alleged in a 1968 federal lawsuit filed by his descendants over the 70-acre parcel then at issue, Frémont bought a 13.5-acre property in the mid-1850s for $42,000, and then improved it by about $40,000.

Appointed a major general in the Union army at the start of the Civil War, Frémont's repeated serious conflicts with President Lincoln led him to resign by late 1862. In 1863, the government seized the property without payment, by executive order of Lincoln, on the grounds it was needed for the war effort. Frémont would again contest the US presidency in 1864, running as the candidate of Radical Democratic Party, only resigning the effort when Lincoln fired a political enemy in his cabinet as a concession.

The 1968 lawsuit was perhaps the last shot of a century-long legal struggle to obtain compensation for the seized realty. In 1870, the government returned property to 49 parties in the vicinity, but not to Frémont and a few others. At that time, Frémont was still very preoccupied with enough of the vast fortune he had made through gold-mining before the Civil War that the matter was unlikely of concern to him; but by 1872 he was in grave financial trouble he would never escape before his death in 1890. Over the years, at least 24 Congressional committees would vote to compensate Frémont, and finally in February 1898 President William McKinley signed a bill directing that the court of claims fix the compensation due. But in 1968 the Frémont heirs complained it had failed to carry out this direction, with John Frémont then recently dead and his widow Jessie over 70 years old.

=== The fort as government property ===
The Civil War prompted the construction of several coastal defense batteries located inside the Golden Gate. Initially these defenses were built as temporary wartime structures rather than permanent fortifications and one of these was constructed in 1864 at Point San Jose, as the location of Upper Fort Mason was then known. A breast-high wall of brick and mounts for six 10-inch (250 mm) Rodman cannons and six 42-pounder guns were built on the site. Excavation in the early 1980s uncovered the well-preserved remains of the western-half of the temporary battery, and it has now been restored to its condition during the Civil War.

The fort was named Fort Mason in 1882, after Richard Barnes Mason, a former military governor of California.

President Grover Cleveland established the Endicott Board in 1885 for the purpose of modernizing the nation's coastal fortifications. Chaired by Secretary of War William Endicott, the board recommended new defenses at 22 U.S. seaports, deeming San Francisco Harbor second only to that of New York in strategic importance. As a result, an extensive series of forts, batteries, and guns were built on the harbor, including Fort Mason.

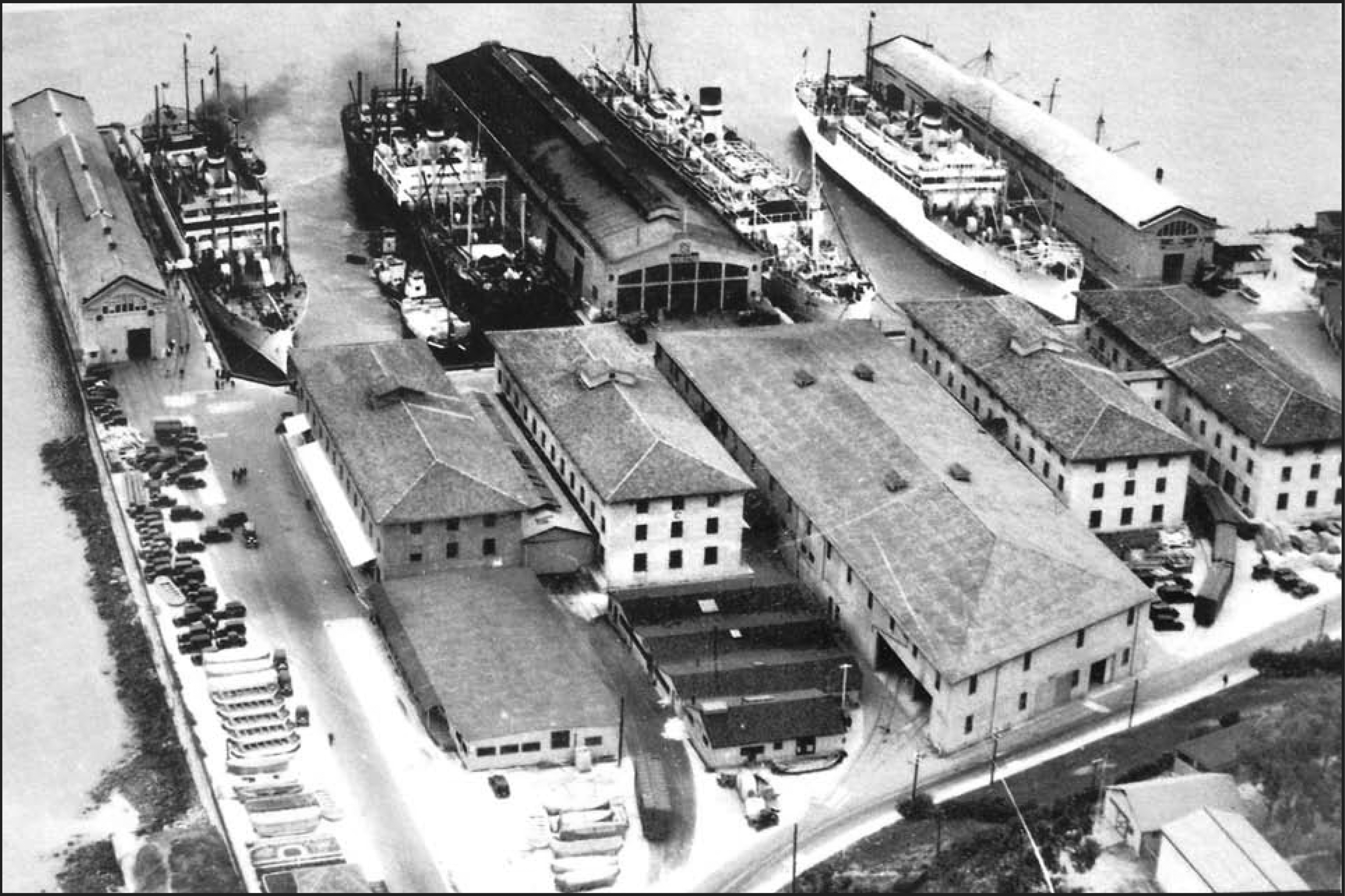
U.S. Army transports berthed at the U.S. Army Transport Service docks at Fort Mason, CA, about 1929.

In 1904, the previous Division of the Pacific (1869–91) was re-established and formally stood up as the Pacific Division with subordinate or related commands, including the Department of California (to include the Hawaiian Islands) and the Department of the Columbia. The Pacific Division was headquartered at Fort Mason, San Francisco. By the end of 1907, the War Department, under Secretary of War William Howard Taft, had eliminated the echelon of administrative units called Divisions and subsequently the Pacific Division that same year. Notably, the first and only commander of the Pacific Division was Major General Arthur MacArthur Jr from 1903 to 1907.

The piers and sheds of Lower Fort Mason were originally built from 1912 to warehouse army supplies and provide docking space and a base for ships of the Army Transport Service. By this time, the US Army began to build new posts in Hawaii, the Philippines, and various other Pacific islands. Most of the materiel for those posts was shipped through San Francisco. By 1915, the three piers together with their associated warehouse had been completed, and Fort Mason Tunnel driven under Upper Fort Mason to connect with the State Belt Railroad along the Embarcadero.

With these new facilities, Fort Mason was transformed from a harbor defense post into a logistical and transport hub for American military operations in the Pacific. The Army ferry USAT General Frank M. Coxe provided scheduled transportation from Fort Mason to the processing center at Fort McDowell on Angel Island up to eight times per day during the war. USAT Meigs was used to transport cavalry horses from Fort Mason's pier to Fort Mills.

==== San Francisco Port of Embarkation (1932—1955) ====
The SS Jeremiah O'Brien, a World War II era Liberty ship, at Fort Mason.

The San Francisco Port of Embarkation, a new command, was created on 6 May 1932 under Brigadier General Charles S. Lincoln with headquarters at Fort Mason assuming command over the Army Transport Service, the San Francisco General Quartermaster Depot at Fort Mason and the Overseas Replacement and Discharge Service at Fort McDowell, California. (Note: The much larger and more established World War I New York Port of Embarkation, which had been discontinued on 24 April 1920, was reestablished on the same date.)

With the rest of the world at war since 1939, the U.S. Army began updating and improving facilities across the country, without however an improved budget. On 1 October 1940 Army Engineer Col John C. H. Lee was promoted to brigadier general, and named Commanding General, Pacific Ports of Embarkation. He set up shop at Fort Mason, and spent exactly a year improving Army port facilities from Seattle to San Diego.

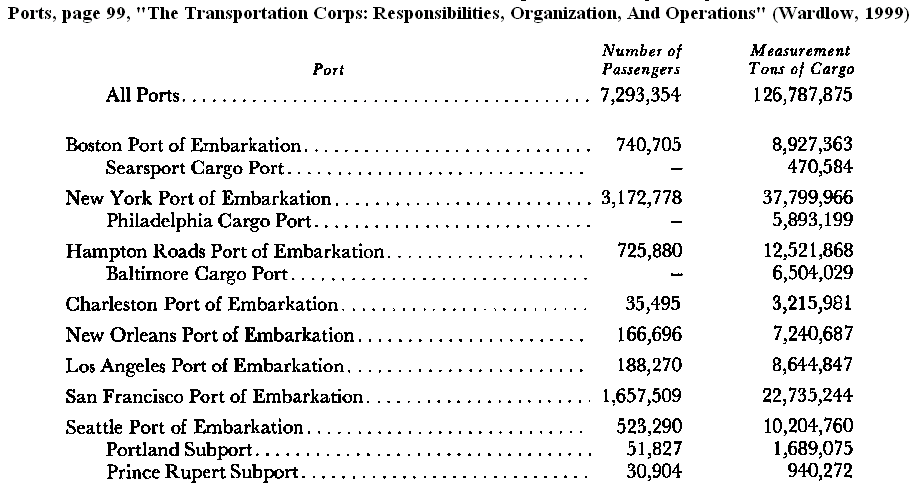
Army Ports: Passengers and tons of cargo embarked during the period December 1941 – August 1945.

During World War II, Fort Mason became the headquarters of the San Francisco Port of Embarkation, controlling a network of shipping facilities that spread across the Bay Area. Thirteen installations in the San Francisco area beyond Fort Mason were part of the San Francisco POE. Oceangoing ships used 20 piers with 43 berths with the port having storage space of 2,867,000 sq ft (266,353.0 m^{2}) in warehouses, 1,984,000 sq ft (184,319.6 m^{2}) in transit sheds and 7,640,000 sq ft (709,779.2 m^{2}) of open space storage. Other facilities included the piers at Alameda, the Richmond Parr Terminals, an Air Force depot, the Emeryville Ordnance Shops, Hamilton Field for air shipments and the Presidio which included an animal depot. The Stockton Piers and the Humboldt Bay Piers were more distant elements of the port. The largest facility in the bay was what was to become the 624.5 acres (2.527 km^{2}) Oakland Army Base at the terminus for the transcontinental railroads. Camp Stoneman was the principal troop staging area for and under the command of the San Francisco Port of Embarkation.

During the early months of the War, Lieutenant Ronald Reagan, US Cavalry Reserve, was assigned to a planning unit ("The Backroom Boys") commanded by Colonel Phillip T. Booker.

Over the years of the war, 1,647,174 passengers and 23,589,472 measured tons moved from the port into the Pacific. (Note: Sources vary on the numbers. Wardlow, 1999, on page 99 has 1,657,509 passengers and 22,735,244 measured tons of cargo.) This total represents two-thirds of all troops sent into the Pacific and more than one-half of all Army cargo moved through West Coast ports. The highest passenger count was logged in August 1945 when 93,986 outbound passengers were loaded.

The Korean War in the 1950s also kept the post busy, and in 1955 the San Francisco Port of Embarkation was renamed the U.S. Army Transportation Terminal Command Pacific.

==== Later Army transportation function ====
The embarkation operations continued through the early sixties. In 1965 the headquarters of the US Army Transportation Terminal Command were transferred to the Oakland Army Terminal, and most of Fort Mason's embarkation facilities fell into disuse. The Army continues to use and maintain the old officer housing. The National Park Service took over the administration of the site in the 1970s as a part of the Golden Gate National Recreation Area. In 1976 lower Fort Mason became the Fort Mason Center, a non profit organization that provides a destination for programs, events and organizations that support and reflect the evolving cultural fabric of San Francisco and the Bay Area. (GGNRA).

== Current uses ==
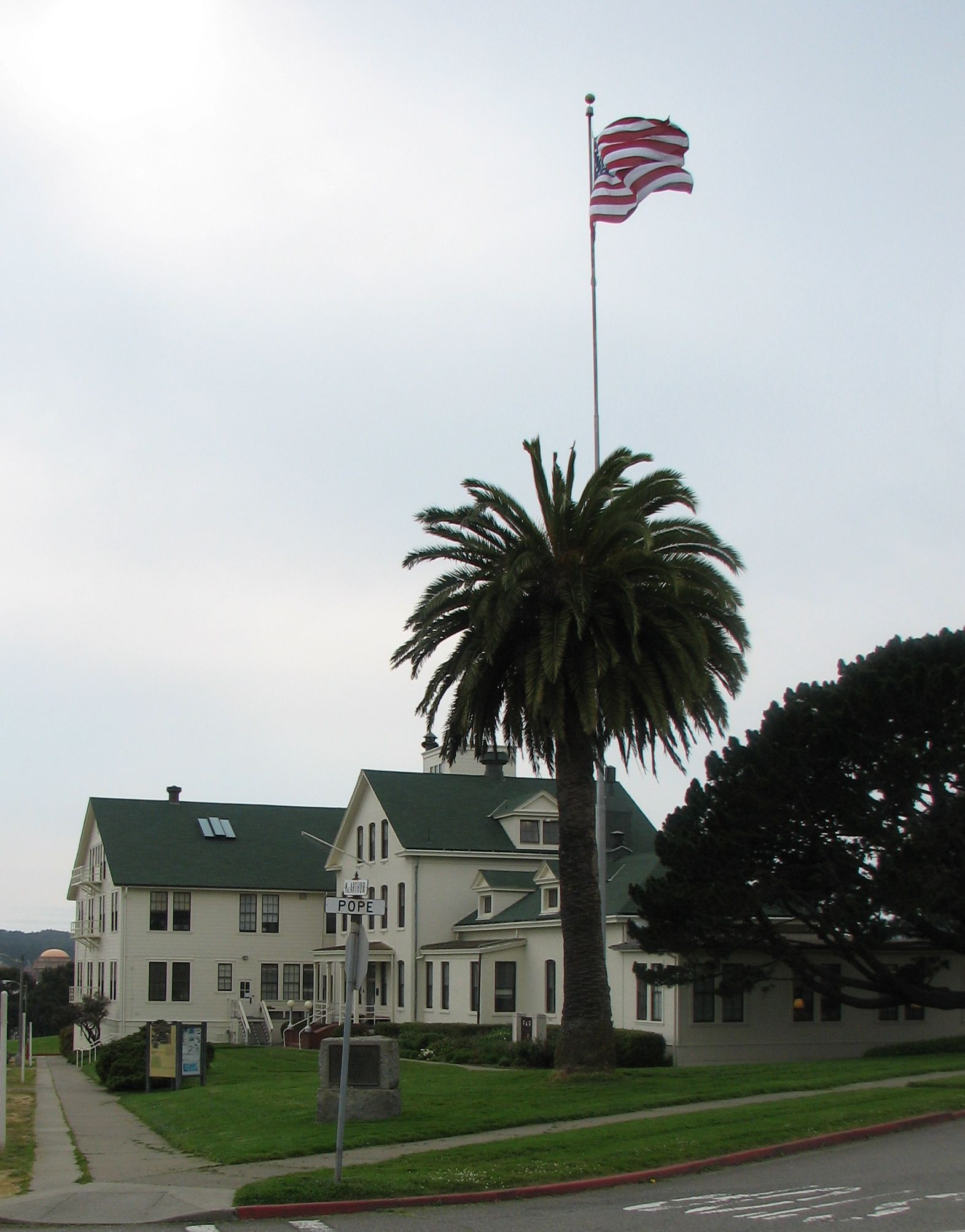
GGNRA headquarters building in Upper Fort Mason

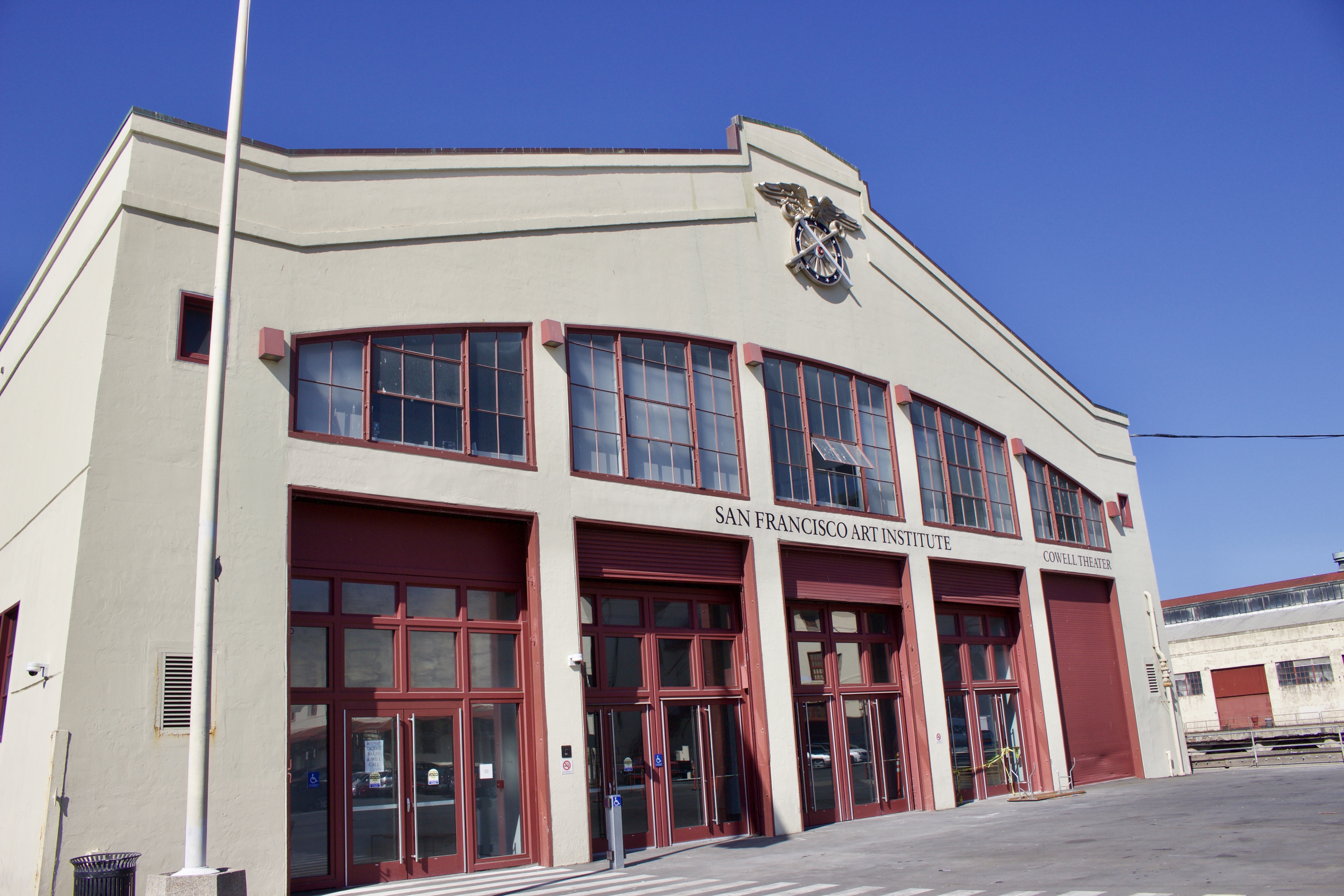
The Herbst Pavillion

Some of the old officer housing remains in use by the Army, while some is rented to the public. One of the larger buildings has been converted into a youth hostel, operated by Hostelling International USA.

As a whole, the former post is now a mix of parks and gardens and late nineteenth and early twentieth century buildings that are still in use. A path follows the harbor edge, rising along the headland and offering views north past Alcatraz and west to the Golden Gate Bridge.

The lower portion of the site is known as the Fort Mason Center for Arts & Culture (FMCAC). FMCAC is a non-profit and their campus houses the San Francisco Museum of Modern Art Artists Gallery, Blue Bear School of Music, City College of San Francisco Art Campus, The Interval, Greens Restaurant, Readers Bookstore, Magic Theatre, the Mexican Museum, Embark Gallery, Off the Grid, BATS Improv, San Francisco Children's Art Center, Museo ItaloAmericano, Flax art & design, California Lawyers for the Arts and other organizations connected to arts and culture. The newest space is Gallery 308, whose inaugural exhibition was Janet Cardiff'sThe Forty Part Motet (November 14, 2015 – January 18, 2016), followed by Sophie Calle's Missing (June 22, 2017 – August 20, 2017). From 2017 until its closure in 2022, the San Francisco Art Institute opened a graduate program campus, housed in FMCAC's historic Herbst Pavilion.

The National Park Service headquarters for both the Golden Gate National Recreation Area and the San Francisco Maritime National Historical Park are located in Fort Mason.

Operations for the United States Park Police are located in the fort, providing police services for the Golden Gate National Recreation Area in San Francisco and Marin County.

== Future developments ==
A proposal exists to extend the F Market & Wharves or E Embarcadero historic streetcar line to a terminal at Lower Fort Mason. This extension would run from the vicinity of the existing terminal near Fisherman's Wharf, westward alongside the San Francisco Maritime Museum and Aquatic Park, and then through the existing, now unused, San Francisco Belt Railroad tunnel under Upper Fort Mason.

A technical feasibility study, under the aegis of the National Park Service and San Francisco Municipal Railway, was completed in December 2004. An Environmental Impact Statement for the extension, involving the San Francisco Municipal Railway, National Park Service and Federal Transit Administration, commenced in May 2006. The Draft Environmental Impact Statement (DEIS) was completed in March 2011, and was scheduled to be reviewed by December 2011.

== See also ==
- New York Port of Embarkation
