= Fort Mason Tunnel =

Former rail tunnel in San Francisco

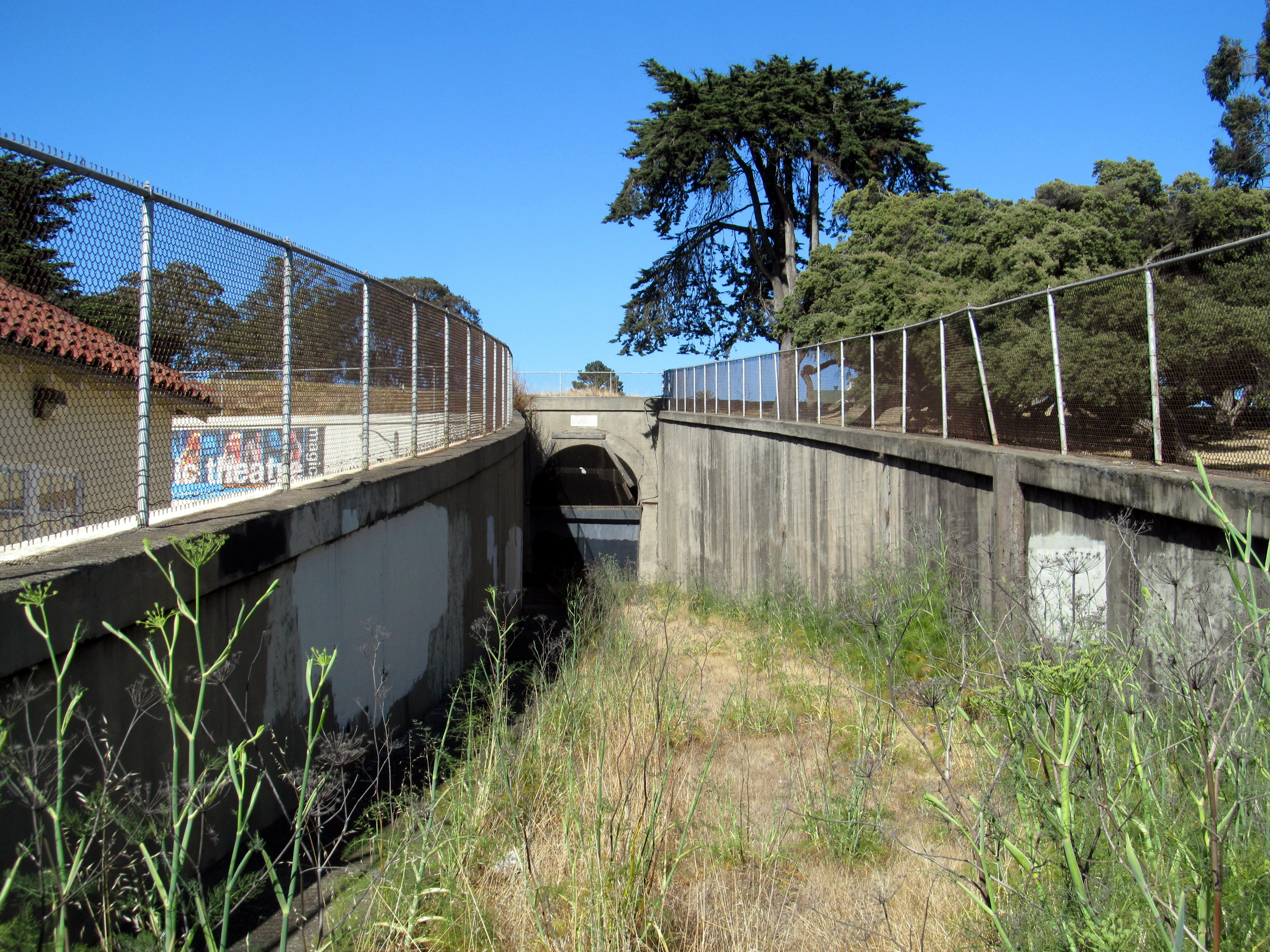
- The west portal of the Fort Mason Tunnel in disuse as seen in June 2017
- Interactive map of Fort Mason Tunnel

Overview
- Line: State Belt Railroad
- Location: San Francisco, California
- Coordinates: 37°48′19″N 122°25′52″W
- Start: Van Ness
- End: Marina Bl. at Laguna St.

Operation
- Opened: 1914
- Closed: 1993
- Owner: National Park Service
- Character: Tunnel

Technical
- No. of tracks: 1
- Track gauge: 4 ft 8 1/2 in (1,435 mm) standard gauge

Fort Mason Tunnel is an abandoned single-track railway tunnel in San Francisco which runs under a small hill upon which sits a portion of the old Fort Mason. The tunnel was constructed in 1913 and opened to rail traffic in 1914. The east portal is near the north end of Van Ness Avenue; the west portal feeds onto Marina Boulevard at Laguna Street.

== History ==
The tunnel's construction served several purposes. The rail link supplied goods and mass transit to the Panama Pacific International Exposition the following year; the U.S. Army utilized the line for construction of the port of embarkation at Fort Mason. The tunnel operated as part of the State Belt Railroad until the route's suspension in 1993. A portion of the movie Dirty Harry was filmed on either side of the tunnel in 1971.

== Future ==
In 2012, the National Park Service released a final environmental impact report on providing extended service through the tunnel to the San Francisco Municipal Railway F Market & Wharves line. The cost of refurbishment and extension of the rail line was estimated at $60 million in 2017.
