= Belt Railroad Engine House and Sandhouse =

- U.S. National Register of Historic Places
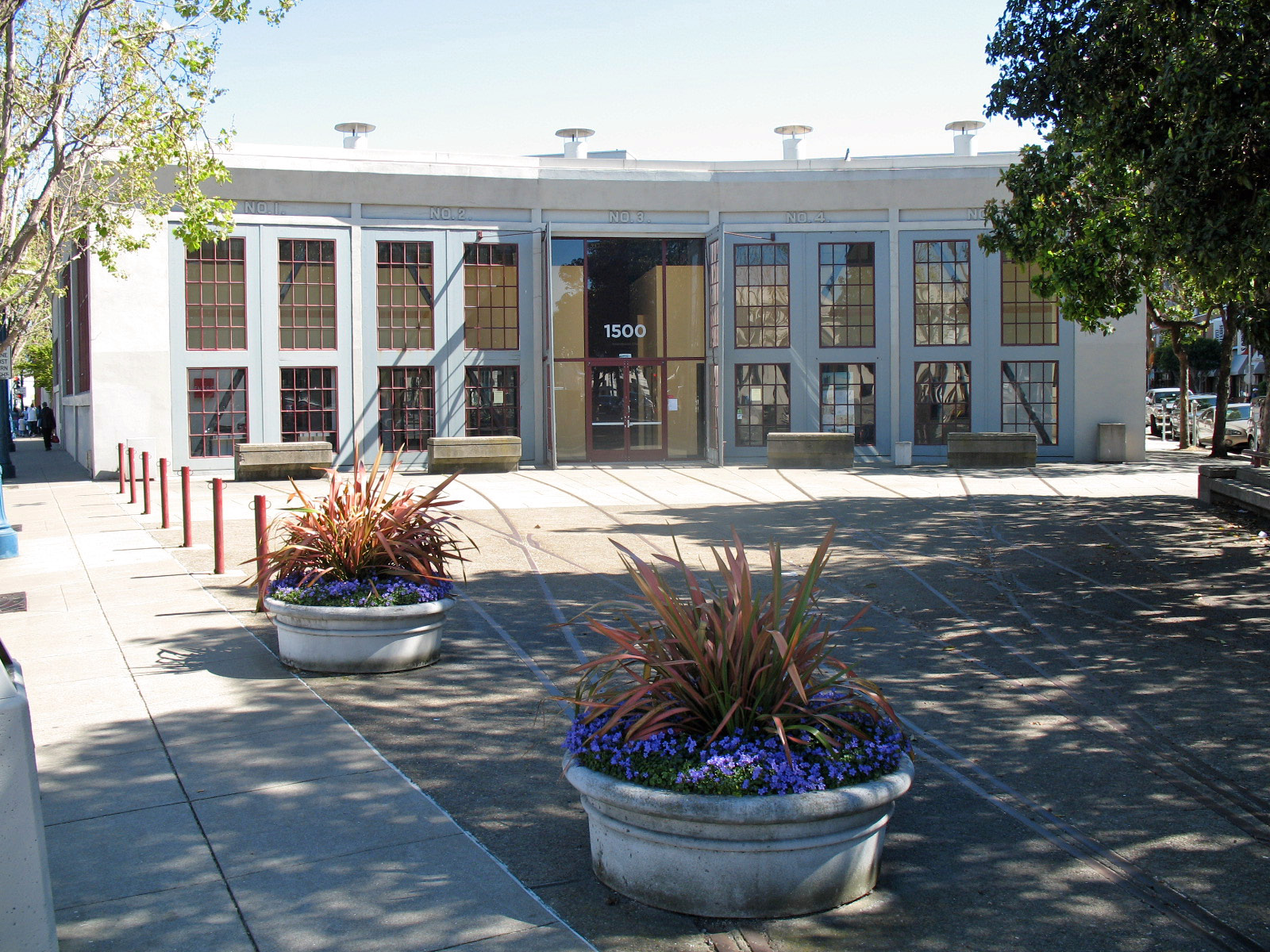

- Location within San Francisco County Location within California Location within the United States
- Location: Block bounded by Lombard, Sansome, and the Embarcadero, San Francisco, California
- Coordinates: 37°48′17″N 122°24′12″W
- Area: 0.7 acres (0.28 ha)
- Built: 1913, 1914
- Architects: Newman, Freeman & Alden
- NRHP reference No.: 86000207
- Added to NRHP: February 13, 1986

The Belt Railroad Engine House and Sandhouse, also known as Beltline Railroad Roundhouse and Sandhouse, in San Francisco, California, was listed on the National Register of Historic Places in 1986.

It served the San Francisco Belt Railroad. The property includes an engine house/roundhouse known as the Engine House and later as the roundhouse, which was built in 1913, and an auxiliary building known as the sandhouse, which was built in 1914. Both buildings are made of reinforced concrete, finished with cement plaster.

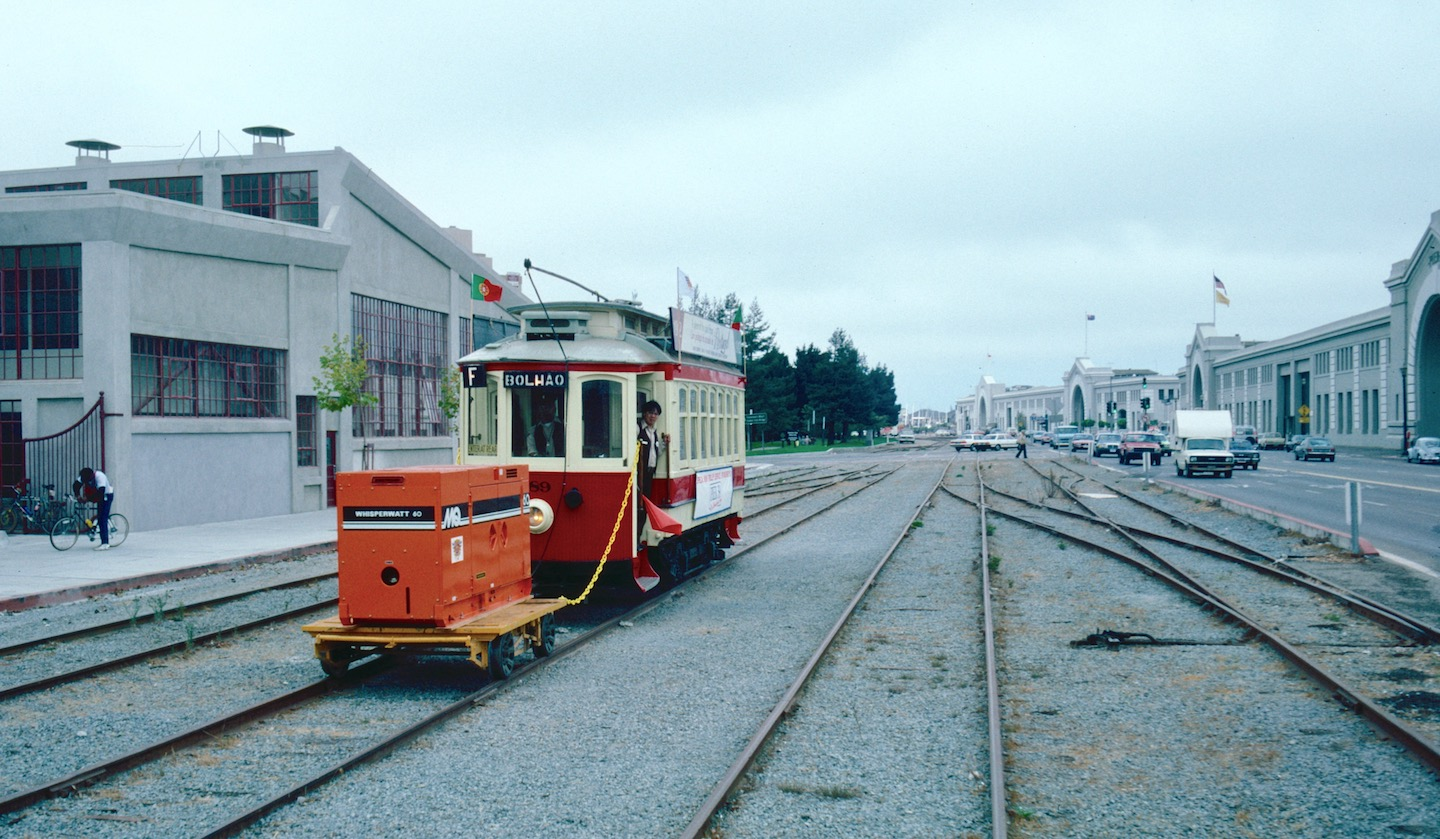
Belt Railroad tracks passing the Engine House in 1987, during a streetcar demonstration service that used the freight tracks for a short time

The property comprises the block bounded by Lombard St., Sansome St., and the Embarcadero. It was designed and/or built by Newman, Freeman & Alden.

It was designated City and County of San Francisco Landmark #114.
