= Fred E. Stewart =

American tax administrator

Fred E. Stewart

Fred E. Stewart (c. 1881–1942) was a member of the California State Board of Equalization from 1926 to 1942, representing 18 northern counties from Sacramento to Bakersfield. He was a co-author of the California retail sales tax and was twice president of the National Association of Tax Administrators.

Stewart was appointed in 1917 as superintendent of the California State Belt Railroad, which operated on the San Francisco waterfront. He was elected four times as a Republican to the Board of Equalization — in 1926 (unopposed), 1930 (72.8 percent win against Fred E. Butler, Democrat), 1934 (95.3 percent win against Pete Garcia, Communist), and 1938 (98.5 percent win against Leon M. Donihue, write-in). In 1933 he was director of the State Tax Research Bureau.

In 1936, law-enforcement agencies began to investigate reported corruption in the Board of Equalization. The Los Angeles Times reported:

Startling charges of graft and corruption in the investigation of California's liquor control administration, which involved prominent political figures of the north and south, held the attention of the state last week. Starting from a single complaint of a $500 pay-off to settle a law violation, the scandale became a snowball rolling downhill with charges of "shakedowns" and "favoritism" being hurled on all sides. . . . Among the first to be subpoenaed were former City Attorney Erwin P. Werner and his wife, Mrs. Helen M. Werner . . . . Discovery of two dictograph microphones in the Werner offices and the pilfering of their office were sensational developments in the case. In Oakland the Alameda county grand jury subpoenaed Fred Stewart . . . for questioning.

He told investigators he had never been to the Werner ranch near Glendora, as reported, "and any statement to that effect is an unmitigated lie."

The investigation of the relationship between the wine industry and the government continued over the years, and in November 1939 Stewart, fellow board member William G. Bonelli and seven other people were indicted in by a Los Angeles grand jury for conspiring to obtain $15,000 from California wine makers. The charges against Stewart were later dismissed.

Stewart died at his home in Oakland on April 17, 1942, at the age of 61. He was survived by his wife and five children.
