= San Francisco Belt Railroad =

Former railroad in San Francisco, US

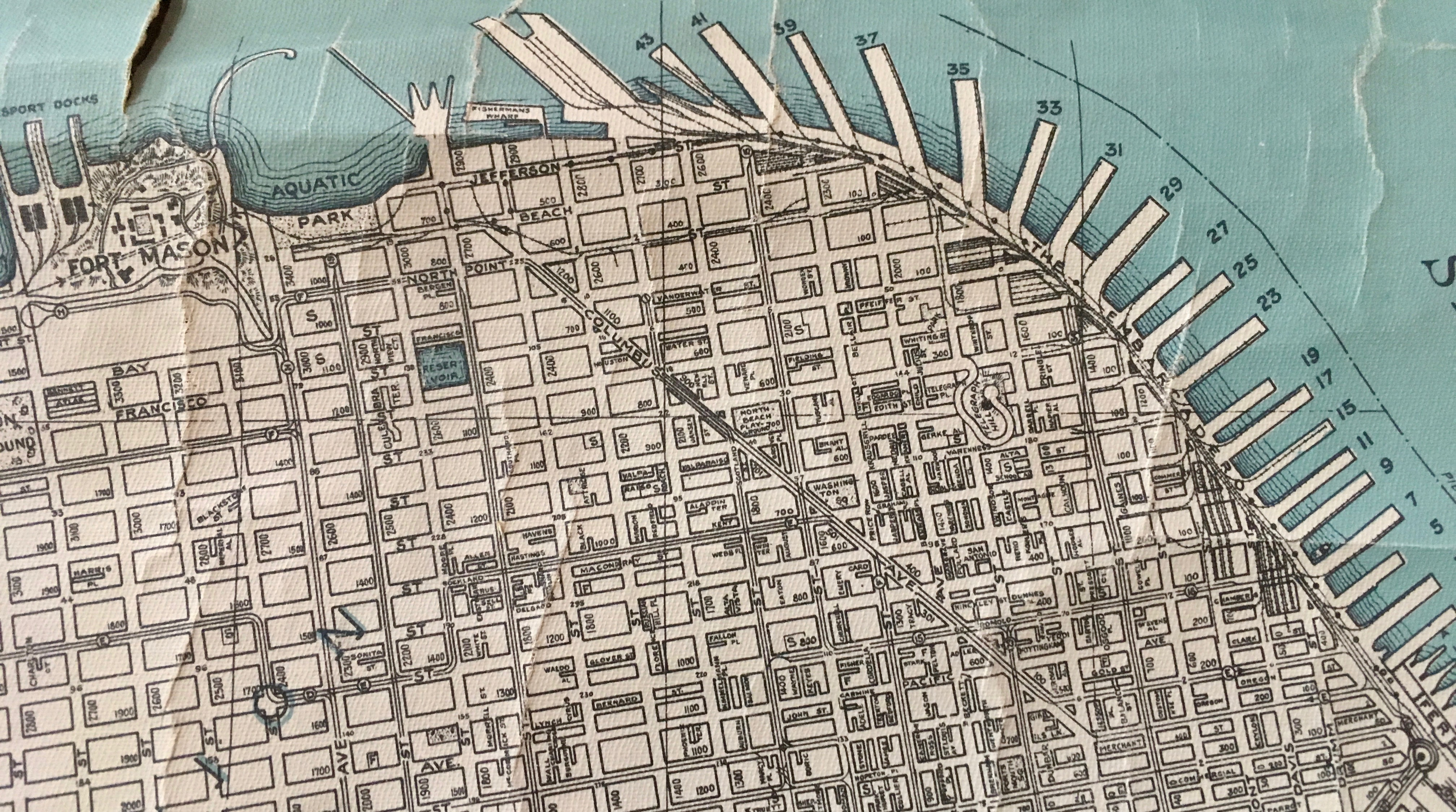
The northern section, in the Presidio, with the line passing through Fort Mason Tunnel, c. 1937

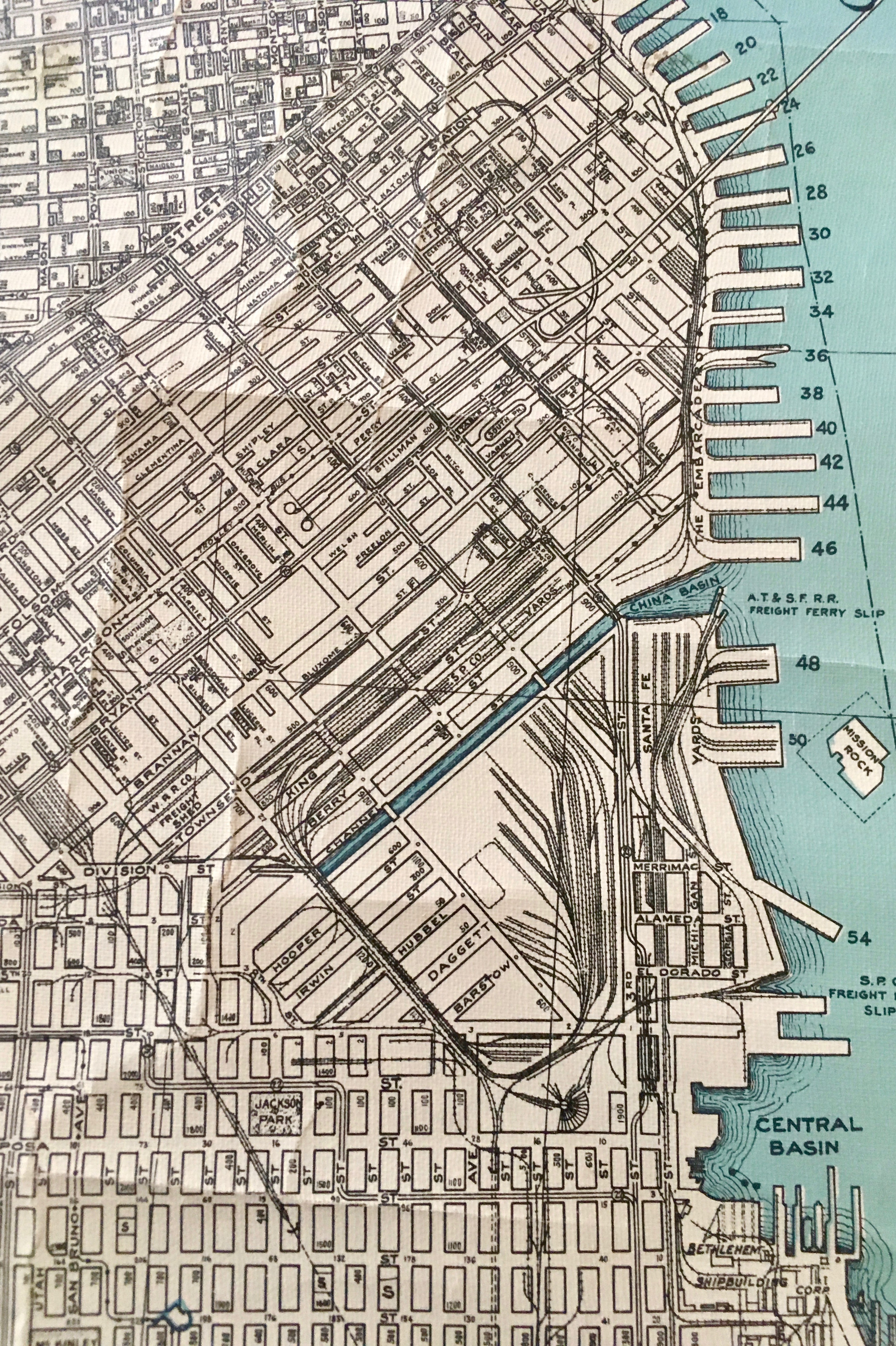
The southern portion of the line, with a track along King Street connected with the Southern Pacific Railroad

The San Francisco Belt Railroad was a short-line railroad along the Embarcadero in San Francisco, California. It began as the State Belt Railroad in 1889 and was renamed when the city bought the Port of San Francisco in 1969. As a state-owned enterprise, the railroad asserted several unsuccessful claims to immunity from federal regulation. The railroad ceased operation in 1993.

The railroad connected the Port of San Francisco to many waterfront docks and to industries and warehouses which were adjacent to the waterfront. In its early years, it operated dual-gauged track to accommodate the North Pacific Coast Railroad and South Pacific Coast Railroad. It would eventually have 67 miles (108 km) of trackage and general offices in the Ferry Building. Its function was to switch railroad cars from four major railroads to points along its system and vice versa. At the southern portion of the line, a track along King Street (passing the location now occupied by Oracle Park) connected with the Southern Pacific. A train ferry slip at Pier 43 allowed interchange with the Northwestern Pacific, the Western Pacific, and the Atchison, Topeka & Santa Fe railroads. To reach its northern terminus, tracks passed through Fisherman's Wharf and Aquatic Park. The line was extended through a tunnel to serve Fort Mason during World War I, and it was further lengthened to the Presidio Army Base in 1917.

The Belt tracks were utilized for the San Francisco Historic Trolley Festival in 1987, with electric streetcars being operated along the line via hauled diesel generators. While this demonstration lasted only a month, it prompted interest in utilizing the disused right of way for local transit purposes. The San Francisco Municipal Railway would go on to surface their portion of the Market Street subway south of Market Street along The Embarcadero, with service beginning in 1998. Simultaneously, the newly permanent F Market historic streetcar line was extended north along the former Belt Railroad right of way to Fisherman's Wharf in 2000.

The line was largely paved over to form the current Embarcadero, with rails set in the median for streetcar and light rail services. San Francisco Municipal Railway's E Embarcadero line now traverses the route between the Caltrain (former Southern Pacific) station and Fisherman's Wharf, with other lines covering portions of the route. The former roundhouse has been converted to commercial business but exists in a recognizable form on the Sansome Street, Lombard Street, The Embarcadero, and Chestnut Street block.

The San Francisco Bay Railroad is the successor to the Belt Railroad and received approval to operate the remaining five miles (8.0 km) of track in 2000.

== Locomotives ==
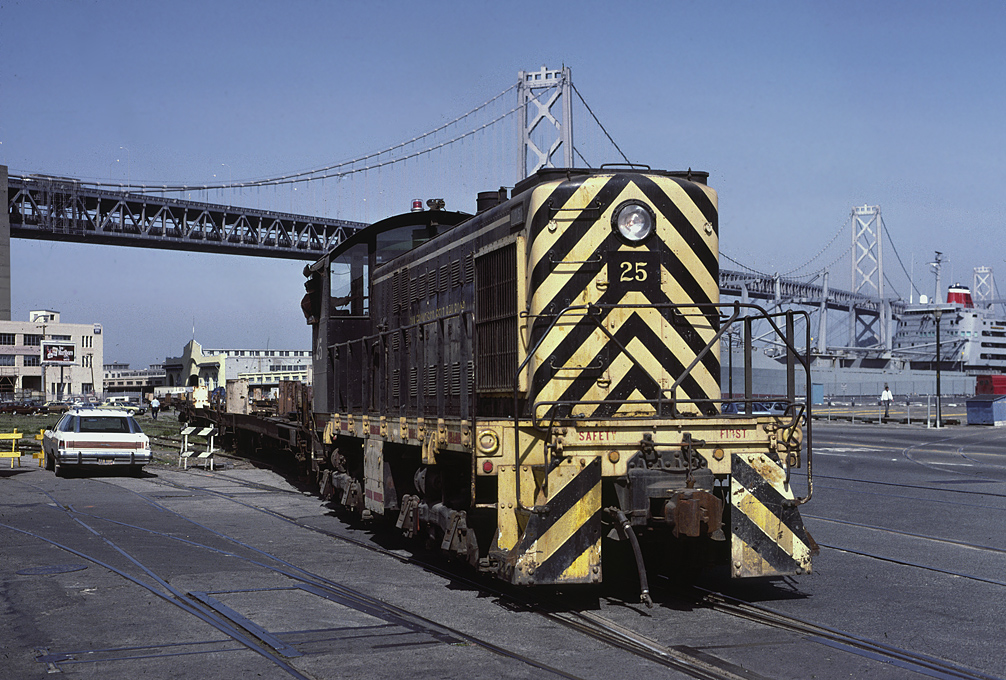
SFBR No. 25 switching as TOFC flats are loaded onto a ship in September 1985

During its years of operation, the railroad had 12 steam locomotives and six ALCO diesel engines:

Motive Power
Number	Arrangement	Year	Builder
Governor Markham	2-4-2T	1891	Baldwin
Number 2	0-4-2T	1901	Baldwin
Number 3	0-4-2T	1904	Baldwin
Number 4	0-6-0	1906	Vulcan
Number 5			
Number 6	0-6-0	1913	Baldwin
Number 7	0-6-0	1914	Alco-Brooks
Number 8	0-6-0	1916	
Number 9	0-6-0	1920	Alco-Brooks
Number 10	0-6-0	1923	Baldwin
Number 11	0-6-0	1927	
Number 12			
Number 20	S2		Alco
Number 21	S2		Alco
Number 22	S2	1944	Alco
Number 23	S2	1944	Alco
Number 24	S2	1945	Alco
Number 25	S2		Alco

=== Special trains ===
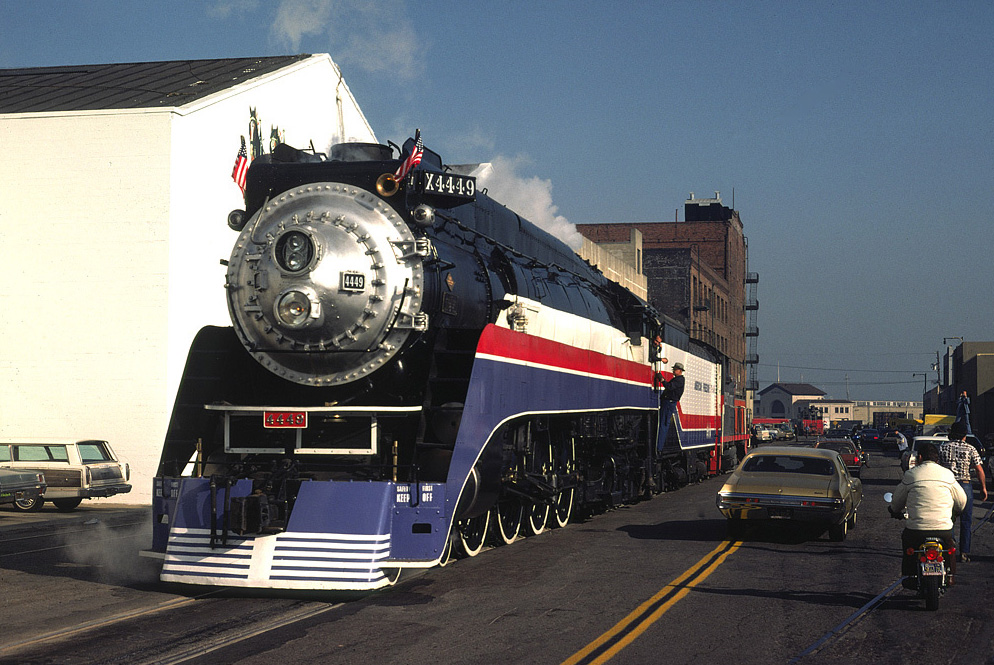
No. 4449, at 3rd and King Streets, assisted by a Southern Pacific Railroad switcher on November 19, 1975

Over the years, the belt railroad's tracks hosted several noteworthy locomotives and trains.

In 1948, the first Freedom Train made an appearance on the State Belt Railroad.

The California Zephyr was positioned near the Ferry Building for its inaugural ceremony in 1949.

In 1951, the Maritime Museum brought an early 4-4-0 steam locomotive and its consist to the SFBR, as part of the museum’s grand opening.

The first civilian passenger excursion train operated over the road on July 21, 1956.

In 1972, the Flying Scotsman concluded its American tour by shuttling back and forth on a stretch of track adjacent to the Embarcadero and near Fisherman's Wharf. Its owner, Alan Pegler, ran out of funds and the Flying Scotsman spent most of 1972 stored at an army base in Stockton, California.

In November 1975, the American Freedom Train, pulled by former Southern Pacific locomotive No. 4449, visited San Francisco. For public viewing, the train's cars were switched to the Presidio by the Belt line. No. 4449 itself remained on display at Aquatic Park near the foot of Hyde Street.

In March 1977, Canadian Pacific Royal Hudson No. 2860 visited the State Belt while heading to Los Angeles.

In 1987, the tracks along the Embarcadero just south of Sansome Street hosted Railfair ’87. Diesel and steam locomotives, including V&T's J.W. Bowker (a 2-4-0 locomotive), were on display.

== Steam Locomotive #4 ==
Currently, locomotive #4 is being restored by the San Francisco Trains group, with larger plans to change the old Bayshore Roundhouse, originally owned by Southern Pacific, to a historic community destination. Due to work on the Roundhouse, it has been listed on the National Register of Historic Places.

== See also ==
- Fred E. Stewart, former superintendent
