= Kenny Smith =

American basketball player and sports commentator (born 1965)

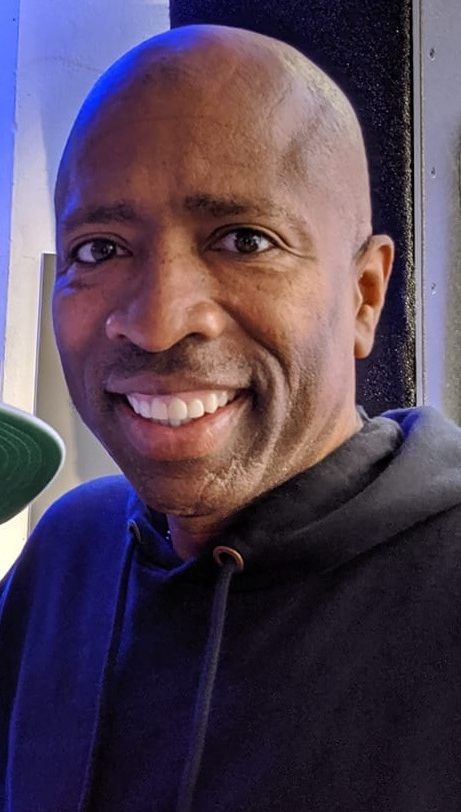
- Smith in 2017

Personal information
- Born: March 8, 1965 (age 61) New York City, New York, U.S.
- Listed height: 6 ft 3 in (1.91 m)
- Listed weight: 170 lb (77 kg)

Career information
- High school: Archbishop Molloy (Queens, New York)
- College: North Carolina (1983–1987)
- NBA draft: 1987: 1st round, 6th overall pick
- Drafted by: Sacramento Kings
- Playing career: 1987–1997
- Position: Point guard
- Number: 30, 31

Career history
- 1987–1990: Sacramento Kings
- 1990: Atlanta Hawks
- 1990–1996: Houston Rockets
- 1996: Detroit Pistons
- 1996–1997: Orlando Magic
- 1997: Denver Nuggets

Career highlights
- 2× NBA champion (1994, 1995); NBA All-Rookie First Team (1988); Consensus first-team All-American (1987); First-team All-ACC (1987); 2× Second-team All-ACC (1985, 1986); No. 30 honored by North Carolina Tar Heels; Second-team Parade All-American (1983); McDonald's All-American (1983)

Career NBA statistics
- Points: 9,397 (12.8 ppg)
- Rebounds: 1,454 (2.0 rpg)
- Assists: 4,073 (5.5 apg)
- Stats at NBA.com
- Stats at Basketball Reference
Medals
Men's basketball
Representing United States
FIBA World Championship
| Gold medal – first place | 1986 Spain | National team |

Kenneth Smith (born March 8, 1965), nicknamed "the Jet", is an American sports commentator and former professional basketball player who played for six teams during his 10-year career in the National Basketball Association (NBA). He won back-to-back NBA championships with the Houston Rockets in 1994 and 1995.

Smith played college basketball for the North Carolina Tar Heels, earning consensus first-team All-American honors as a senior in 1987. He was selected by Sacramento in the first round of the 1987 NBA draft with the sixth overall pick and was named to the NBA All-Rookie First Team with the Kings. After retiring from playing, Smith became a basketball commentator for the Emmy Award-winning Inside the NBA on TNT and ESPN as well as NBA Countdown. He also works as an analyst for CBS/Turner during the NCAA Division I men's basketball tournament.

== Early life ==
Smith was born in Brooklyn, New York, (Note: In November 2012 via Twitter, Smith claimed to have been born in Brooklyn, New York City, while most sources claim his birthplace as Queens.) and grew up in Queens, spending time in the LeFrak City neighborhood. He played some of his earliest basketball at New York's Riverside Church and at Stephen A. Halsey Junior High School in Rego Park, Queens. Smith attended Archbishop Molloy High School, where he was coached by Jack Curran, the high school coach with the most wins in New York City and New York State history. Smith was named a McDonald's All-American in 1983, then played basketball at the University of North Carolina for Dean Smith.

Kenny Smith credits former South Carolina State star Bobby Lewis with his development as a shooter and ballhandler. Lewis averaged 30.9 points per game and was a First Team Division II All-American as a senior at South Carolina State. He later developed the Bobby Lewis Basketball Skills Development Program, a training regimen that he presented at basketball camps around the country. Smith attended several of his lectures while in high school, and continued to use Lewis's drills throughout his basketball career, to this day teaching them at his own basketball camps. Of Lewis, Smith said, "He's the best lecturer ever. He had the best influence in terms of my workout regimen without question."

== College career ==
Smith joined junior Michael Jordan and senior Sam Perkins on a North Carolina team that was a pre-season #1 and finished the season ranked #1 with a 28–3 record. Smith averaged 9.1 points and 5.0 assists per game, and the Tar Heels lost to Indiana in the regional semifinals of the 1984 NCAA tournament. He led North Carolina to the Elite Eight in 1985, losing to eventual national champion Villanova. Smith was named a Consensus All-American (1st Team) as senior in 1987, averaging 16.9 points, 6.1 assists per game while helping North Carolina to return to the Elite Eight. Playing in a game that featured eleven future NBA players, Smith led the Tar Heels with 25 points and seven assists in a loss to Syracuse, 79–75.

During his career at North Carolina, Smith averaged 12.9 points and 6.0 assists per game, while shooting .512 from the field, and .823 from the free throw line. In 1986–87, the first season the NCAA added three-point field goals, Smith shot .408. As of 2016, he ranks second in school history in total assists (768), fourth in total steals (195), and fifth in assists per game. Smith helped North Carolina to a record of 115–22 from the 1983–84 to 1986–87 seasons, including two Elite Eight appearances (1985 and 1987) and a Sweet Sixteen appearance in 1986. They won the Atlantic Coast Conference (ACC) regular season conference championships in 1984 and 1987, and tied for first in 1985. North Carolina never finished lower than eighth in the national polls during Smith's four years at the school.

=== International career ===
Smith represented the United States in the 1986 FIBA World Championship, on a team that included David Robinson, Muggsy Bogues and Steve Kerr: the last to exclusively feature amateur American players. He was second on the team in scoring behind Charles Smith with 14.7 points per game. Smith scored 23 points to lead the US to an 87–85 win and the Gold Medal over a Soviet Union team that featured Arvydas Sabonis.

== Professional career ==
=== Sacramento Kings (1987–1990) ===
The Sacramento Kings selected Smith with the sixth overall pick of the 1987 NBA draft. He made his NBA debut in their season opener against the Golden State Warriors on November 6, 1987, scoring 11 points with five assists in Sacramento's win. Under Hall of Fame head coach Bill Russell (who would step down as coach to become General Manager 58 games into the season), Smith was immediately a starter in Sacramento. He went on to average 13.8 points and 7.1 assists per game and be named to the NBA All-Rookie Team 1st Team.

In 81 starts his second season, Smith averaged 17.3 points, 7.7 assists and 1.3 steals in 38.8 minutes per game. In his third season, he competed in the dunk contest, and made it to the finals of the competition, scoring high points for originality with his signature dunk—he started by turning his back to the basket, bouncing the ball backward between his legs and off the backboard, then turning and grabbing it in the air and reverse dunking it. He narrowly lost to Dominique Wilkins—who would become his teammate just days later with the Atlanta Hawks.

=== Atlanta Hawks (1990) ===
Midway through the 1989–90 season, Smith was traded to the Atlanta Hawks in exchange for Antoine Carr. He was a reserve player for the first time in his career, averaging 7.7 points per game while only starting five of thirty-games he played for the Hawks as a backup to team captain Doc Rivers.

=== Houston Rockets (1990–1996) ===
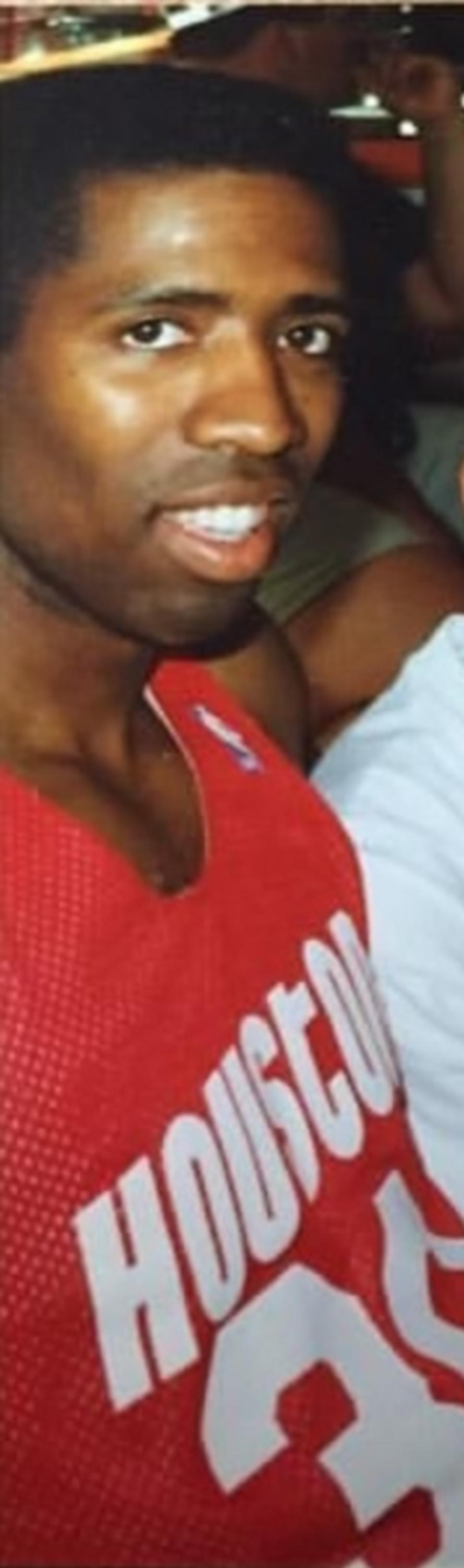
Smith with the Rockets

After the 1989–90 season, Smith and Roy Marble were traded to the Houston Rockets in exchange for John Lucas and Tim McCormick. In 1990–91 Smith averaged 17.7 points per game while leading the Rockets in assists per game (7.1) and free throw percentage (.844). Despite Hakeem Olajuwon missing 25 games due to injury, Smith helped the Rockets to a 52–30 record, the best regular season in franchise history at the time. He received votes for the NBA Most Valuable Player Award (more than any Rockets teammate including Olajuwon), and finished in third place in Most Improved Player voting.

With Olajuwon, Smith's former Sacramento teammate Otis Thorpe and fellow backcourt mate Vernon Maxwell, the Rockets had the foundation for a championship contender. Despite this, Houston started the 1991–92 season only 26–26, and Don Chaney was fired as coach and replaced by former Rocket player Rudy Tomjanovich. The Rockets then went 55–27 in 1992–93, losing to the Seattle SuperSonics in the second round of the playoffs in seven games. Smith helped to force a game seven against Seattle by scoring 30 points, shooting 4–6 from three-point range, in a Game 6 victory for Houston.

The Rockets won back-to-back championships in 1993–94 and 1994–95 with Smith as the starting point guard. From the 1992–93 to 1994–95 seasons, Smith averaged 11.7 points and 4.5 assists per game, with a three-point percentage of .425. In 57 playoff games during the same period, Smith had nearly identical averages of 11.6 points and 4.3 assists, shooting .456 from three-point range.

The first of the two championships concluded a year that Houston started hot with a 22–1 record en route to a franchise-best 58–24 record. Their second championship came on the heels of a much different season; Maxwell left the team, Thorpe was traded for Clyde Drexler, and Houston finished the year going 18–18 in their final 36 games to finish third in the Midwest Division with a 47–35 record. They would still go on to win the championship that season, becoming the lowest seeded playoff team to win the championship (with the statistically most difficult path to the championship).

In the first game of the 1995 Finals against the Orlando Magic, Smith had 23 points, 9 assists and made seven three-pointers, including the game-tying shot which sent the game into overtime. Smith's 7 three pointers in the first game of the 1995 NBA Finals was an NBA record at the time. The Rockets won the game 120–118, and went on to sweep the Magic in four games.

Smith had been gradually losing playing time to Sam Cassell, but he continued to be the Rockets' starting point guard through the 1995–96 season. Although Smith's points, assists, steals and minutes per game declined for the fifth straight season, he was still productive in 1995–96. He averaged 8.5 points and 3.6 assists per game, and shot .382 from three-point range and .821 from the free throw line. The Rockets finished fifth in the NBA Western Conference with a 48–34 record, upsetting the fourth-seeded Los Angeles Lakers in the first round before being swept in the second round by eventual Finals runner-up Seattle SuperSonics. In game four of the series against the Lakers, Smith had 17 points, 6 assists and was 4–4 from three-point range to help the Rockets win the series clincher 102–94.

=== Detroit Pistons (1996) ===
On September 17, 1996, Smith signed with the Detroit Pistons. However, he saw minimal playing time behind Lindsey Hunter and Joe Dumars, and was waived after only nine games to open a roster spot for Jerome Williams.

=== Orlando Magic (1996–1997) ===
Smith signed with the Orlando Magic on December 18, 1996, though he was released after just six games.

=== Denver Nuggets (1997) ===
In 1997, Smith then signed with his third team in that season, the Denver Nuggets. Smith averaged 7.9 points and 3.1 assists while playing just under twenty minutes per game, also serving as a mentor for the young Denver team. Overall for the season, Smith averaged 6.3 points and 2.4 assists per game, the lowest averages of his career, while his three-point percentage of .437 (59/135) was the second highest of his career (and the fourth season in which he shot better than 40 percent on three-pointers). He attended training camp in 1997 with the New Jersey Nets, but did not make John Calipari's final roster and retired shortly after.

In his professional career, Smith scored 9,397 points (12.8 avg.), recorded 4,073 assists (5.5 avg) while shooting .480 from the field, .399 from three-point range, and .829 from the free throw line. He finished in the NBA top ten in three-point percentage three times (1992–93, 1993–94, 1994–95), and top ten in free throw percentage twice (1992–93 and 1993–94). In the 1988–89 season Smith was fifth in the league in minutes played, seventh in minutes per game, and tenth in total assists. Smith's career three-point percentage of .399 42nd in NBA history through 2010. Through 2016, Smith held the Denver Nuggets franchise record for career three-point percentage (.425), and ranked among the all-time leaders in several categories for the Sacramento Kings and the Houston Rockets.

== NBA career statistics ==
Legend
| GP | Games played | GS | Games started | MPG | Minutes per game |
| FG% | Field goal percentage | 3P% | 3-point field goal percentage | FT% | Free throw percentage |
| RPG | Rebounds per game | APG | Assists per game | SPG | Steals per game |
| BPG | Blocks per game | PPG | Points per game | **Bold** | Career high |
| † | Won an NBA championship |

=== Regular season ===
| Year | Team | GP | GS | MPG | FG% | 3P% | FT% | RPG | APG | SPG | BPG | PPG |
|---|---|---|---|---|---|---|---|---|---|---|---|---|
| 1987–88 | Sacramento | 61 | 60 | 35.6 | .477 | .308 | .819 | 2.3 | 7.1 | **1.5** | .1 | 13.8 |
| 1988–89 | Sacramento | 81 | 81 | **38.8** | .462 | .359 | .737 | **2.8** | **7.7** | 1.3 | .1 | 17.3 |
| 1989–90 | Sacramento | 46 | 46 | 38.0 | .461 | .373 | .809 | 2.6 | 6.6 | 1.2 | **.2** | 15.0 |
| 1989–90 | Atlanta | 33 | 5 | 29.4 | .480 | .167 | .846 | 1.1 | 4.3 | .7 | .0 | 7.7 |
| 1990–91 | Houston | 78 | 78 | 34.6 | **.520** | .363 | .844 | 2.1 | 7.1 | 1.4 | .1 | **17.7** |
| 1991–92 | Houston | 81 | 80 | 33.8 | .475 | .394 | .866 | 2.2 | 6.9 | 1.3 | .1 | 14.0 |
| 1992–93 | Houston | **82** | **82** | 29.5 | **.520** | **.438** | **.878** | 2.0 | 5.4 | 1.0 | .1 | 13.0 |
| 1993–94† | Houston | 78 | 78 | 28.3 | .480 | .405 | .871 | 1.8 | 4.2 | .8 | .1 | 11.6 |
| 1994–95† | Houston | 81 | 81 | 25.1 | .484 | .429 | .851 | 1.9 | 4.0 | .9 | .1 | 10.4 |
| 1995–96 | Houston | 68 | 56 | 23.8 | .433 | .382 | .821 | 1.4 | 3.6 | .7 | .0 | 8.5 |
| 1996–97 | Detroit | 9 | 0 | 7.1 | .400 | .500 | 1.000 | .6 | 1.1 | .1 | .0 | 2.6 |
| 1996–97 | Orlando | 6 | 0 | 7.8 | .462 | .600 | 1.000 | .3 | .7 | .0 | .0 | 2.8 |
| 1996–97 | Denver | 33 | 3 | 19.8 | .422 | .425 | .854 | 1.1 | 3.1 | .5 | .0 | 7.9 |
| Career | | 737 | 650 | 30.1 | .480 | .399 | .829 | 2.0 | 5.5 | 1.0 | .1 | 12.8 |

=== Playoffs ===
| Year | Team | GP | GS | MPG | FG% | 3P% | FT% | RPG | APG | SPG | BPG | PPG |
|---|---|---|---|---|---|---|---|---|---|---|---|---|
| 1991 | Houston | 3 | 3 | **37.7** | .474 | **.500** | .889 | **2.7** | **8.0** | **1.3** | **0.3** | **15.3** |
| 1993 | Houston | 12 | 12 | 32.6 | **.492** | **.500** | .778 | 2.0 | 4.2 | 0.8 | 0.1 | 14.8 |
| 1994† | Houston | 23 | 23 | 30.3 | .455 | .447 | .808 | 2.3 | 4.1 | 1.0 | 0.2 | 10.8 |
| 1995† | Houston | 22 | 22 | 29.6 | .438 | .442 | .900 | 2.2 | 4.5 | 0.6 | 0.1 | 10.8 |
| 1996 | Houston | 8 | 8 | 23.9 | .434 | .387 | **1.000** | 1.5 | 4.8 | 0.6 | 0.0 | 8.9 |
| Career | | 68 | 68 | 30.0 | .457 | .448 | .847 | 2.2 | 4.5 | 0.8 | 0.1 | 11.5 |

== Broadcasting career ==
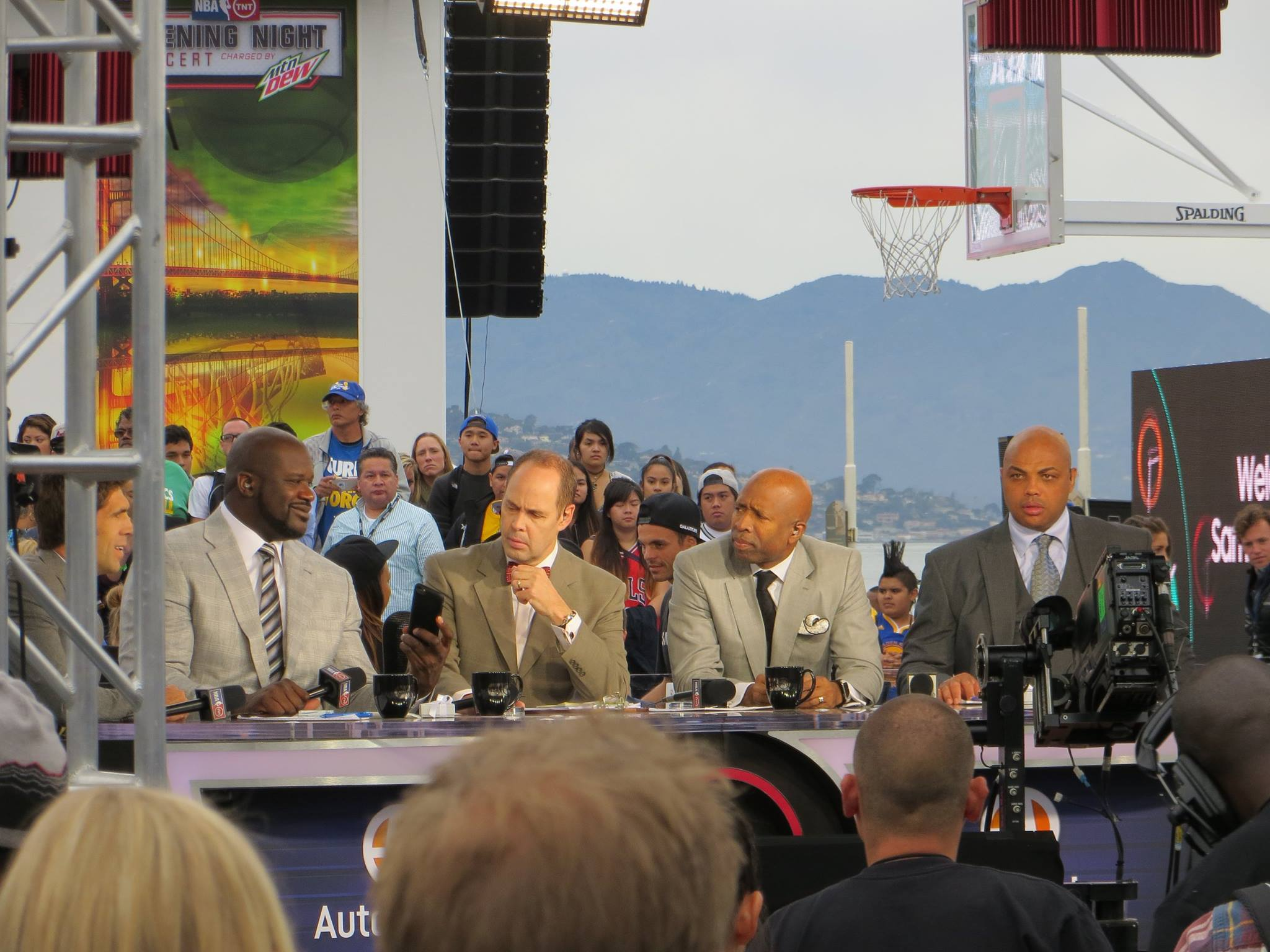
Smith (second from right) with the Inside the NBA crew in 2015

Smith joined Turner Sports in early 1998, working as a studio analyst for end of the NBA regular season and the playoffs. Smith works with Ernie Johnson Jr., Charles Barkley, and Shaquille O'Neal on Inside the NBA, a winner of the Sports Emmy Award for Outstanding Studio Show. Smith covered basketball for the 2001 Goodwill Games, and he occasionally appears on NBA TV as an analyst. Smith provided commentary for the MSG Network's broadcasts of New York Knicks games from 2005 to 2008 and works as an analyst for CBS/Turner during the NCAA Division I men's basketball tournament. The New York Times has written that Smith's work in broadcasting has made him a household name, significantly boosting his public celebrity beyond what he had during his playing career.

During the 2010 NBA All-Star Weekend, Smith was a member of the Texas team that won the Shooting Stars Competition.

While on the Scoop B Radio Podcast in 2017, Smith told Brandon Scoop B Robinson that the 1994 Houston Rockets would have beaten Michael Jordan and the Chicago Bulls had they faced each other in the NBA Finals.

On the August 26, 2020 edition of Inside the NBA, Smith left the set as a show of solidarity with the six teams that elected to boycott the day's games in response to the shooting of Jacob Blake. The live broadcast, originally scheduled to lead into a double-header, was turned into a panel discussion of racial injustice in America after the announcement of the games' postponements.

In October 2022, Smith signed a long-term contract extension with Warner Bros. Discovery Sports to continue as a host on Inside the NBA.

On November 5, 2025, Smith signed a separate multi-year agreement with ESPN (who had licensed "Inside the NBA" once TNT lost broadcasting rights starting with the 2025-26 NBA season) to appear on certain ESPN programming such as First Take, NBA Countdown, and call certain games as an analyst in addition to his existing work with TNT.

== Acting career ==
Smith played sports agent Leon Rich in the movie Hustle (2022), starring Adam Sandler and Juancho Hernangómez.

== Personal life ==
Smith has been married three times. He has two children from his first marriage: Kayla, an R&B singer, and a son who played for basketball for the University of North Carolina, his father's alma mater, from 2018 to 2021.

After divorcing his first wife, Smith met English model Gwendolyn Osborne in 2004 at a charity event. They married on September 8, 2006. They have two children together. Smith is also stepfather to Osborne's daughter from a previous marriage. Osborne is a former model on The Price Is Right. Gwendolyn Osborne filed for divorce in 2018.

Smith later married his third wife, Croatian influencer Tia Jurcic, in August 2026.

Smith earned a degree in Industrial Relations from UNC in 1987.
