= Pier 43 Ferry Arch =

Ferry arch at Pier 43, San Francisco, California, U.S.

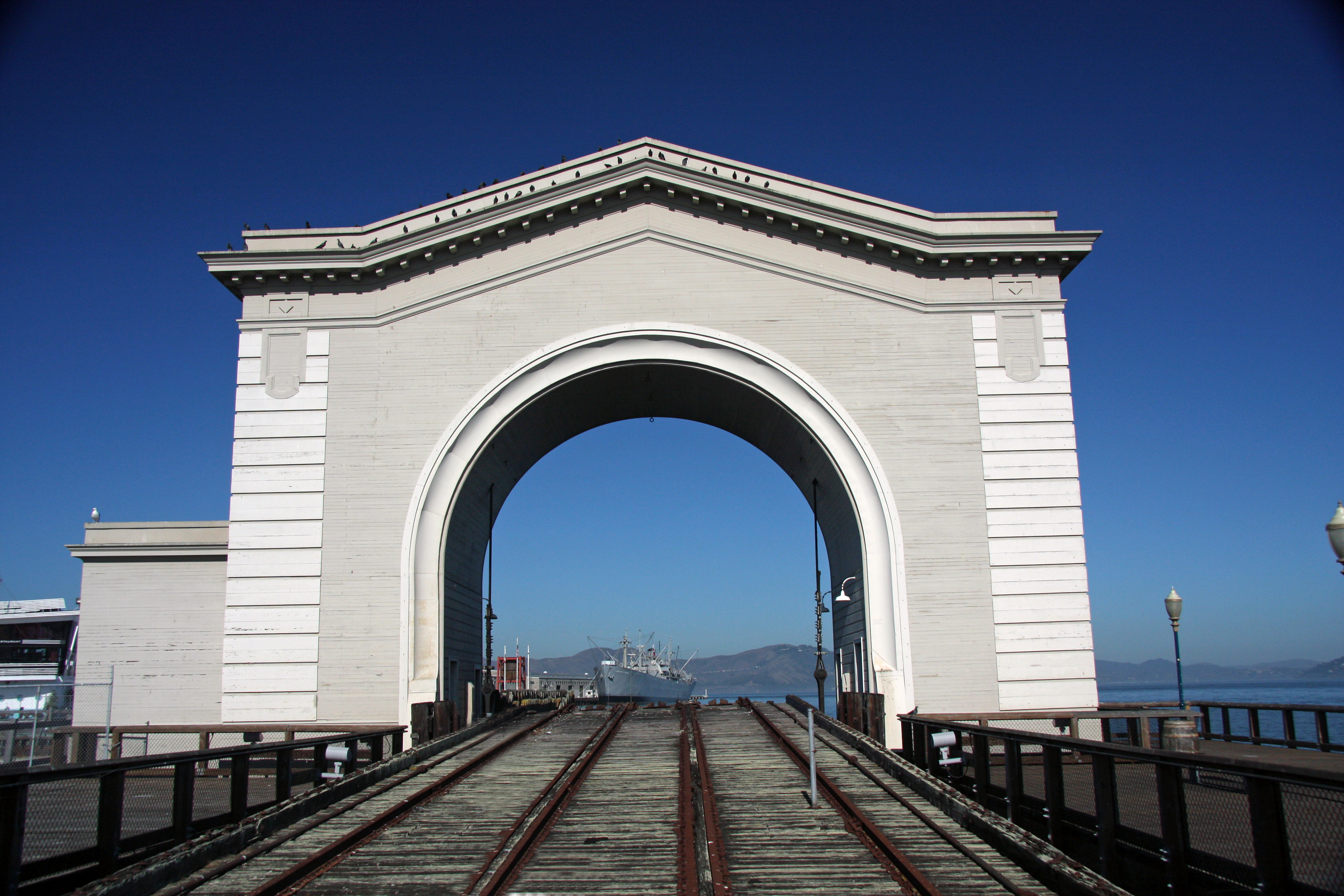
- The arch in 2009
- Interactive map of the Pier 43 Ferry Arch area

General information
- Location: San Francisco, United States
- Coordinates: 37.809291°N 122.413345°W
- Opened: 1914
- Renovated: 1996, 2003

The Pier 43 Ferry Arch is a historic ferry arch at Pier 43 in San Francisco's Fisherman's Wharf, in the U.S. state of California. Its headhouse, a decorated hoisting tower for loading and unloading rail cars on and off ferries, was built in 1914 to serve the Belt Railroad. The wood pier was replaced in 1996. The headhouse was rehabilitated in 2002–2003 to the Secretary of the Interior's Standards after a fire in 1998.
