= Major League Baseball on television in the 2010s =

Sports broadcasts

On August 28, 2012, it was announced that ESPN and Major League Baseball had agreed on a new eight-year deal that increased ESPN's average yearly payment from about $360 million to approximately $700 million.

== Year-by-year breakdown ==
=== 2010 ===
The 2010 season marked the first full season in the United States for baseball games to be telecast in the digital format. The national telecast breakdown is as follows, along with the maximum number of appearances per team:

- FOX: Saturday afternoon Game of the Week on a regional basis; nine appearances per team. In addition, the network will broadcast the All-Star Game (which was also broadcast in 3-D), NLCS, and World Series. The network starts their telecasts on Saturdays at 4 PM US ET/1 PM US PT, except for three dates (April 10, May 1 and 8) due to NASCAR coverage, when those games started at 3 PM ET/12 noon PT. Two prime time dates were on the schedule on both May 22 and June 26, both starting at 7 PM ET/4 PM PT. Fox Sports en Español holds Spanish broadcast rights to the World Series. In July 2010, Fox's on-screen graphics were repositioned for the 16:9 aspect ratio, as all HDTV programming from the Fox network began to be presented in a letterboxed format using an Active Format Description code for standard definition viewers. The supposed high-definition picture, however, has been derided as coming across as highly imperfect, lacking the detail and clarity normally expected from a high-definition broadcast. Beginning with the 2010 MLB playoffs, Fox has used its NFL theme music for its MLB coverage (and all other Fox Sports properties, including NASCAR and UFC events). There has been backlash from fans who believe that the NFL theme does not belong on MLB coverage, and that the previous MLB theme should return. A poll by Sports Media Watch noted that as of October 23, 2010, while nearly 60% of fans thought that Fox made a bad move, only 11% thought it was a good move and 30% had no opinion (all percentages rounded).
- ESPN/ESPN2: Sunday Night Baseball on a weekly basis; five appearances per team. In addition, there are games on Monday and Wednesday nights (with the Monday games moving to either Wednesday nights to form a doubleheader or Friday nights when the 2010 NFL season begins), Opening Day games on April 5, and the Home Run Derby on July 12, which was also broadcast on ESPN 3D. ESPN Deportes holds Spanish rights to the Sunday night package. Starting with the April 3 season opener between the New York Yankees and Boston Red Sox, ESPN began using the same graphics package which debuted with Monday Night Football in 2009. The score banner was converted to a score box in the bottom right hand corner of the screen. And instead of numbers to represent the balls, strikes and outs, dots were represented for each: three green dots for balls, two yellow dots for strikes, and two red dots for outs. The pitch count was also introduced, adopted from the New York Yankees' broadcasts on the YES Network, as well as NESN for the Boston Red Sox. College baseball and softball broadcasts, however, continued to use the previous (2007) graphics for the 2010 College World Series telecasts. ESPN's coverage of the Little League World Series also retained the 2007 graphics until midway through, and then adopted the current (2010) graphics package. Baseball Tonight, a daily highlight show aired on ESPN during the baseball season, likewise introduced new graphics adopted from SportsCenter in June 2010. Also in 2010, Jon Miller and Joe Morgan began their 21st consecutive season working together for ESPN. Among U.S. network television sportscasters, only Pat Summerall and John Madden (who called NFL games for CBS and Fox from 1981 to 2001) have had a similar length partnership in the booth. Following the 2010 season, ESPN announced that the television contracts of Miller and Morgan would not be renewed. Miller was offered, but chose to decline, a continued role with ESPN Radio.
- TBS: Sunday afternoon games starting on April 11; 13 appearances per team. In addition, the network will carry the announcement of the All-Star Teams in the National and American Leagues on July 4 as well as the Division Series and the ALCS as per the alternating contract with FOX. Blackout rules will again apply here as Headline News will be broadcast in the teams' markets during the regular season. From 2007 to 2010, when TBS aired every Division Series game, start times were staggered throughout the day from early afternoon to late primetime. The first game was usually scheduled to start at 1:07 and the last game was usually scheduled for 9:07. If a game ran long, the start of the next game would be shifted to TNT (the game would move back to TBS during the first commercial break after the end of the earlier game, with an announcement from the in-studio crew to switch to TBS). For the LCS round, TBS would show all of the games at a start time pre-set by MLB. All coverage was followed by Inside MLB. This schedule was brought back for 2013 only, with the exception that MLB Network aired the two games scheduled for the early afternoon slot.
- MLB Network: The network will again air a weekly Thursday Night Game of the Week and Saturday Night Game of the Week, and for the first time, selected afternoon games. Thursday Night games are produced in-house, while Saturday Night games and midweek day games (except for the Civil Rights Game, May 22 and June 26) will usually come off the home team's video production. Blackouts will again apply here, as viewers in the competing team's markets will telecast an alternate game off the home team feed of selected teams. In addition, holiday games on Memorial Day (May 31) and day games on July 5 and in addition, commencing on September 5 (Labor Day), expanded coverage of the pennant races will be taking place with additional games broadcast.

In Canada, Toronto Blue Jays games will be televised on Rogers Sportsnet and Rogers Sportsnet One. RSN also holds the Canadian rights to air the Fox and ESPN/ESPN2 games if they do not conflict with Blue Jays games, as well as the All-Star Game and the entire postseason. Starting May 16, TSN2 holds rights to the ESPN Sunday Night Baseball telecasts.

In Australia free to air channel One HD shows up to 5 regular season games live per week (no postseason coverage), and European channel ESPN America broadcasts games as well.

=== 2011 ===
The national telecast breakdown is as follows, along with the maximum number of appearances per team:

- Fox: Saturday afternoon Game of the Week on a regional basis; up to nine appearances per team. In addition, the network broadcast the All-Star Game, ALCS, and World Series. Fox Deportes held Spanish broadcast rights to the World Series. Most Saturday games started at 4 PM US EDT/1 pm PDT, except for games on April 9, April 30 and May 7, when those telecasts began at 1 PM US EDT/10 AM US PDT due to NASCAR coverage and on May 14, 21 and 28, the latter because of the UEFA Champions League final as those games were scheduled to start at 7 PM ET/4 PM PT. Starting with Opening Day of the 2011 MLB season, both the Fox broadcast network and Fox Sports Networks began using the same graphics package adopted for NFL on Fox telecasts in 2010, featuring a new horizontal layout with team abbreviations (as opposed to the use of team logos on the NFL version) and scores flanking a display of the inning, diamond, count, outs (represented by 3 lights), and pitch speed in the center. The new scoreboard was also able to slide open to reveal statistical information or home run notifications.
- ESPN/ESPN2: Sunday Night Baseball on a weekly basis; five appearances per team. A new broadcast team with Dan Shulman and Orel Hersheiser joined Bobby Valentine, replacing Jon Miller and Joe Morgan. In addition, there were games on Monday and Wednesday nights (with the Monday games moving to either Wednesday nights to form a doubleheader or Friday nights when the 2011 NFL season began), Opening Day games on both March 31 and April 1, and the Home Run Derby on July 11. ESPN Deportes held Spanish rights to the Sunday night package. The ESPN Major League Baseball score box was slightly modified beginning with the opening day game between the Detroit Tigers and the New York Yankees. Numbers indicating the ball, strike and out counts replace the dots used last year; the out dots were adopted by Fox Sports Net on their local broadcasts as well as Major League Baseball on Fox. The pitch speed and count are now fixed below the bases graphic. Also, the area around the bases graphic and ball, strike, and out counter is slightly translucent. Beginning with the Sunday Night Baseball interleague game between the New York Yankees and the Chicago Cubs on June 19, the graphics were slightly adjusted to fit in with the 16:9 aspect ratio for HD broadcasts, similar to what Fox Saturday Baseball, Root Sports and Fox Sports Net have done for their baseball coverage. TBS would follow suit in adjusting their graphics to the 16:9 aspect ratio.
- TBS: Sunday afternoon games starting on April 3; 13 appearances per team. TBS also carried the announcement of the All-Star teams in the National and American Leagues on July 3 as well as the Division Series and the NLCS as per an alternating contract with Fox. Blackout rules applied as HLN broadcast in the teams' markets during the regular season. In 2011 and 2012, TNT aired its own slate of postseason Division Series games, due to MLB's desire to air fewer games in the early afternoon. This was the first time TNT had ever aired regularly scheduled MLB games, however it used TBS's announcers and production crews with the only difference being the TNT logo in the scorebox replacing the usual TBS logo. In 2011, TNT aired Rays–Rangers Game 1, Tigers–Yankees Games 1 and 2, and Brewers–Diamondbacks Game 3. In 2012, TNT aired Reds–Giants Game 1, and A's–Tigers Games 4 and 5. During the network's coverage of Game 1 of the 2011 American League Division Series between the Texas Rangers and Tampa Bay Rays, TBS was alleged to have featured doctored headlines with incorrect attributions. On October 1, during the middle of an at-bat during Game 1 of the 2011 ALDS between the New York Yankees and Detroit Tigers, TBS suddenly cut to an ALDS game between the Tampa Bay Rays and the Texas Rangers, which was airing on TNT, for about 14 seconds. Moments later (as TBS was coming out of a replay and showing the Tigers' dugout), cameras missed Yankees right fielder Nick Swisher making a diving catch (instead showing Yankees pitcher Iván Nova walking off the mound and pumping his fist). TBS (in particular, throughout their coverage of the 2011 postseason) has also been criticized for placing the center-field camera precisely in the center. Therefore, every time a pitcher began his windup, his head would block the view of home plate.
- MLB Network: The network again aired a Thursday Night Game of the Week, games on Tuesday, Friday and Saturday nights, and selected afternoon games. Thursday night games were mostly produced in-house, while all other games came from home teams' video productions. Blackouts applied, as viewers in competing teams' markets saw an alternative game from the feed of selected home teams. In addition, holiday games on Memorial Day (May 30), day games on July 4, Labor Day (September 5) and in addition, commencing in August, expanded coverage of the pennant races took place.

Two more teams joined the growing cable-exclusive telecast teams in 2011. Fox Sports Midwest produced and televised all St. Louis Cardinals games on the cable station, along with selected areas of the Cardinals' DMA outside St. Louis including Fox Sports Tennessee in Tennessee, Fox Sports Indiana in parts of Indiana, and SportsSouth in Arkansas and parts of Oklahoma. The 2010 season was their last season of splitting games with KSDK.

The Minnesota Twins also joined the group, with Fox Sports North becoming their exclusive local home. The 2010 season was their last season of splitting games with WFTC.

Atlanta Braves games that aired on WPCH-TV were produced by and simulcast on Fox Sports South or SportSouth, marking the first season since 1972 which local Braves telecasts weren't produced by Turner Sports.

In Canada, Toronto Blue Jays games were televised on Rogers Sportsnet, which also held the Canadian rights to air the Fox and ESPN/ESPN2 games if they did not conflict with Blue Jays' games, and additional regular season games on a regional basis on Rogers Sportsnet One as well as the All-Star Game and the entire postseason. TSN2 held rights to the ESPN Sunday Night Baseball telecasts.

In Australia, it was free to air channel One HD and showed up to five games live per week, and European channel ESPN America broadcast games as well.

For international viewers, MLB International broadcast the All-Star Game, the NLCS and the World Series.

=== 2012 ===
Major League Baseball enters the 6th year of seven-year contracts it signed with its broadcast partners prior to the 2007 season. This year, Fox will televise the Saturday Game of the Week (which will be shown in prime time each week from May 19 to July 7), the All-Star Game, the National League Championship Series, and the World Series. TBS will show a Sunday Game of the Week, the All-Star Selection Show, all but two Division Series games, the American League Championship Series, and the new wild card elimination games. ESPN will show games on Sunday, Monday, and Wednesday nights (with Monday and Wednesday Night Baseball airing on ESPN2 during April, May and early June due to ESPN's priority to the NBA regular season and playoff coverage, and then Monday Night Baseball moving to form either a Wednesday night doubleheader or a simultaneous airing of a Monday Night game on ESPN and a Wednesday Night game on ESPN2 when the NFL season starts, to accommodate Monday Night Football), and the All-Star Home Run Derby. They will also air 10 spring training games, as well as five nationally televised games on Opening Week from April 4–6. The MLB Network will air a national Game of the Week broadcast every Thursday and the two Division Series games not shown on TBS. Major League Baseball International will air in syndication the All-Star Game, the ALCS, and the World Series to global markets.

The score box and other graphics on ESPN were carried over from 2011, but a new logo for all ESPN MLB presentations was unveiled at the start of the season. The ESPN logo is fixed on a CGI baseball, with the words 'Major League Baseball' (or Baseball Tonight and Sunday, Monday or Wednesday Night Baseball) in a stylized neon light surrounding it. A 2-D version is also used on print ads or on secondary program IDs. The graphics would stay virtually the same for the next three seasons.

For 2012, Fox revised its schedule; while the 3:30 p.m. Eastern Time start time remained intact, weekly games on certain Saturdays when the network was to air NASCAR races held at Texas Motor Speedway, Richmond International Raceway and Darlington Raceway start at 12:30 p.m. Eastern Time. Starting with the date of the UEFA Champions League Final until the Saturday before the All-Star Break, all "Game of the Week" telecasts would start at 7:00 p.m. Eastern Time. The Baseball Night in America moniker was used for all MLB on Fox games in that span.

For the 2012 MLB season, the score box on Fox was modified to use cap insignias instead of team abbreviations, and outs were now represented by only two lamps. Beginning with the 2012 NLCS, the score box was modified again to match the new layout adopted by Fox's NFL coverage at the start of the 2012 season; teams and scores reverted to being vertically stacked on the left, the base graphic moved to the right-hand side, pitch speed is displayed below the base graphic (which now displays the pitch count below the diamond after 40 pitches as well), while the count, outs, and inning number moved to a tab below the box. This graphic was also not removed for the final out of the World Series. In late-March 2013, the Fox Sports Networks began using this version in time for the start of the 2013 MLB season (the previous scoring bug was used for 2013 Spring training games).

On July 24, 2012, Matt Yoder of Awful Announcing questioned Fox's need to hire local broadcasters on their national telecasts and therefore, bringing about a perceived sense of favoritism towards one of the participating teams. For example, Billy Ripken, who played for the Baltimore Orioles alongside his Hall of Fame brother Cal, was roundly criticized for his perceived favoritism towards the Orioles while broadcasting an Orioles–Detroit Tigers game (even by actor Jeff Daniels via Twitter) for Fox the previous week. The following week came a Philadelphia Phillies–San Francisco Giants telecast on Fox, which was called by Phillies play-by-play announcer Tom McCarthy and former Phillies pitcher Mitch Williams. McCarthy and Williams were in particular, singled out for their rather downbeat manner of calling a Matt Cain home run off Cole Hamels in the top of the 3rd inning. This was contrasted by their more enthusiastic call of Hamels returning the favor with a home run in the bottom half of the inning. In 2019, Len Kasper, who is currently the voice of the Cubs, broadcast Cubs-Nationals on Fox with a rather monotonous tone of voice while calling Nationals home runs.

During the 2012 American League playoffs, TBS was criticized for its graphics and game preview packages. At the start of its coverage of the American League Wild Card Game between the Baltimore Orioles and Texas Rangers, a graphical snafu resulted in Cal Ripken Jr., who was calling the game, being credited as "Carl Ripken Jr." During Game 1 of the American League Championship Series between the New York Yankees and Detroit Tigers, TBS showed a graphic depicting players who played in the postseason before the age of 24 and after the age of 40. In the graphic, Willie Mays's name was misspelled as "Willie Mayes".

During the 2012 National League Championship Series, Fox's camera angles were criticized for being directly in-line with home plate, thus often ensuring that a pitcher's head blocked the view. Fox's camera angles were again criticized (this time in an elevated and more dead center camera angle) during FS1's coverage of Game 1 of the 2016 National League Division Series between the Chicago Cubs and San Francisco Giants.

==== Local changes ====
The Padres switched from Cox Cable-owned 4SD to a new channel called Fox Sports San Diego, which the Padres also have a minority stake in.

The Mid-Atlantic Sports Network (MASN), which broadcasts Orioles and Nationals games, became the latest network to adjust its score box to the 16:9 aspect ratio for high-definition television broadcasts. The adjustment, which began with Fox Sports' MLB coverage in 2010, was later adopted to other networks, notably ESPN, TBS, Fox Sports Net (except Fox Sports South and some terrestrial television broadcasts produced by Fox Sports), and Root Sports during the 2011 season. As of this season, only the YES Network, New England Sports Network, Comcast SportsNet, SportsNet New York and SportsTime Ohio have yet to move to the newly adjusted high definition broadcast.

=== 2013 ===
This was the seventh and final year of the current TV contracts with ESPN, Fox Sports and TBS, before the new eight-year TV contracts begin in 2014. ESPN aired games on Sundays, most Mondays, and Wednesdays, in addition to a four-game Opening Day schedule. ESPN also aired the Home Run Derby during All-Star week. TBS carried Sunday afternoon games, along with two League Wild Card Games, League Division Series, and National League Championship Series. Fox aired games on Saturday afternoons and select Saturday nights, and also aired the All-Star Game, American League Championship Series, and World Series. MLB Network had a Thursday game of the week and several simulcasted games from local channels during the season.

Fans of the Pittsburgh Pirates, which in 2013, had its first winning season as well as its postseason appearance since 1992, took TBS to task for not broadcasting the traditional pre-game player introductions, "The Star-Spangled Banner", or ceremonial first pitch during their coverage of the National League Wild Card playoff game against the Cincinnati Reds.

Dick Stockton's performance on TBS has in particular, been subject to criticism. Stockton, for instance, during the 2013 NLDS (St. Louis vs. Pittsburgh) was cited as often misidentifying players, generally appearing confused at times, and never having hosting chemistry with his analyst Bob Brenly. Meanwhile, Joe Simpson, who was the only holdover from the Braves TBS Baseball days, has been accused of not really adding anything to the booth and often deferring to John Smoltz during their time together on the 2013 Boston–Tampa Bay series.

Field reporter Erin Andrews' performance has been criticized since she joined Fox Sports' MLB coverage in 2012. For example, Andrews during trophy presentations, has been accused of showing an extreme lack of knowledge by reading off notes. More to the point, during the trophy presentation at the end of the 2013 American League Championship Series, Andrews misidentified former Anaheim Angels owner and honorary American League president Jackie Autry as her late husband Gene. Andrews was further criticized during the trophy presentations for the 2014 World Series due to her very generic questions that for the most part, lacked insight.

During the bottom of the 9th in Game 4 of the 2013 World Series between the Boston Red Sox and St. Louis Cardinals, Fox's cameras missed Boston closer Koji Uehara picking off pinch runner Kolten Wong to end the game (it was the first postseason game in baseball history to end on a pickoff).

==== Local coverage ====
The Houston Astros switched from Fox Sports Houston to Comcast SportsNet Houston starting this season.

On March 1, 2013, Fox Sports South and SportSouth announced they have picked up 45 more Atlanta Braves games, ending the team's contract with WPCH-TV. This will be the first season in 40 years without locally produced Braves games on over-the-air TV.

This is the final season of Los Angeles Dodgers games on Prime Ticket and KCAL-TV. They will move to a new channel called SportsNet LA in 2014.

Cleveland Indians owner Larry Dolan sold SportsTime Ohio to Fox Sports Networks on December 28, 2012, and it was rebranded as Fox SportsTime Ohio on April 1, 2013.

=== 2014 ===
On September 19, 2012, Sports Business Daily reported that Major League Baseball would agree to separate eight-year television deals with Fox Sports and Turner Sports through the 2021 season. Fox would reportedly pay around $4 billion over eight years (close to $500 million per year) while Turner would pay around $2.8 billion over eight years (more than $300 million per year). Under the new deals, Fox and TBS's coverage would essentially be the same as in the 2007-2013 contract with the exception of Fox and TBS splitting coverage of the Division Series, which TBS has broadcast exclusively dating back to 2007. More importantly, Fox would carry some of the games (such as the Saturday afternoon Game of the Week) on its all-sports channel, Fox Sports 1. Sources also said that was possible that Fox would sell some Division Series games to MLB Network, which did end up occurring.

The new deal between Major League Baseball and TBS was officially confirmed on October 2, 2012. Under the deal:

- TBS' postseason coverage would continue, but would be modified. TBS would now be the exclusive home for the entire postseason for the American League in even numbered years and the National League in odd numbered years. The other league's playoffs would be covered by Fox, with the exception of its Wild Card Game which would be carried by ESPN and select early afternoon games broadcast by MLB Network.
- TBS would also air afternoon games with new co-existing rights on the final 13 Sundays of the regular season as part of the network's Sunday MLB on TBS Game of the Week package.
- TBS would lose the broadcasting rights to the MLB All-Star Selection Show to the MLB Network.

ESPN also agreed to a new contract. Contract provisions in ESPN's contract virtually eliminated local blackouts among the network's Monday and Wednesday night games, allowing ESPN coverage to co-exist with that of the local broadcasters in home markets. Sunday Night Baseball blackout rules still applied.

For the 2014 season, Fox's sister cable channel Fox Sports 1 began providing Major League Baseball game coverage, carrying a Fox Saturday Baseball doubleheader on most weeks. FS1's coverage begins with the pregame show a half-hour before the game, which usually starts at 1:00 or 4:00 p.m. Eastern Time. A second game usually follows at either 7:00 or 8:00 Eastern Time. If there is a gap between the first and second game, a studio show is not aired in between. All of the telecasts are aired nationally instead of on a regional basis; however, the telecast is not exclusive, unless the game is between two teams that whose games are broadcast on the Fox Sports regional networks. Prime time games continue to air on the Fox network, and once again used the 2010 scheduling formula for these telecasts, including full national exclusivity.

Beginning in 2014, Fox Sports 1 added several non-exclusive Tuesday night telecasts outside of its regular Saturday schedule. These games generally feature marquee teams which may attract a large audience, along the lines of the 2004 Red Sox-Yankees telecast or the Mark McGwire telecasts. In 2015, one Thursday game was scheduled, though this was during a rare week in which Fox Saturday Baseball was not scheduled to air.

As part of Fox Sports' new Major League Baseball broadcast deal, in April 2014, Fox Sports 1 premiered MLB Whiparound, an hour-long nightly baseball highlight program (similar in vein to ESPN's Baseball Tonight and MLB Network's MLB Tonight) featuring quick-turnaround highlights, and news and analysis from around the league (live look-ins of games being played in progress generally can not be shown on Whiparound, as MLB Tonight is reserved that right exclusively). It is hosted by Chris Myers, who is joined by one or two analysts rotating between Frank Thomas, Eric Karros, Dontrelle Willis and C. J. Nitkowski. Although Whiparound airs most weeknights at 10:00 p.m., the Wednesday editions are usually delayed to 12:00 a.m. Eastern Time on weeks when Fox Sports 1 airs a sporting event in prime time during the MLB season (on weeks without predetermined programming conflicts, the program airs in its regular 10:00 p.m. slot).

For the 2014 season, Fox's MLB coverage debuted a new graphics package first seen on its NASCAR broadcasts that year. Notably, the score box was moved to the bottom-left corner of the screen. The box places the team abbreviations and scores on the left side over the team's background color. On the top of the right side is the inning (which is the only component in yellow text) and the base graphic; the lower right contains the count and outs (represented by two dots). Above the main box is a new "dynamic" strip, which by default shows the last name of the current pitcher along with the number of pitches he has thrown. However, this strip can be expanded and change color to display team-specific information, such as on-deck hitters and pitchers warming up in the bullpen. In June 2015, this was also expanded to include a white area featuring the last name of the current batter and their performance throughout the game (or their average for their first time at-bat). When a home run is hit, the main box turns to the team's color and displays the text "Home Run", while the dynamic strip grows and displays the name of the team over the team's logo. Other times (usually on FSN), the dynamic strip displays the name of the player who hit that home run and the main box displays the type of home run and how many home runs that player has hit during the season. The graphics package itself is similar to the previous design, though these graphics are more in the shape of a square, with a typeface that is less athletic in style than the previous Fox graphic packages. Starting with the 2016 season, the score box was moved to the bottom right.

With Fox Sports 1 taking over some of the Major League Baseball coverage in 2014, postseason coverage on Fox Sports' end of the package began to be split between the Fox broadcast network and Fox Sports 1. Four games from both National League Division Series matchups aired on Fox Sports 1, with the remaining game airing on MLB Network; however, all of the telecasts were produced by Fox and used Fox Sports announcers (although Bob Costas served as a play-by-play announcer for one of the games). Fox Sports then carried exclusive coverage of the National League Championship Series – in which the Fox network aired a traditional telecast of Game 1, while Fox Sports 1 aired an experimental telecast supplemented by advanced metrics and statistics and standard telecasts for Games 2 through 5. Fox would air Game 6 if necessary, while a possible Game 7 (which did not occur) would end up airing on Fox Sports 1; the Fox network would air the World Series in its entirety. As part of their contract renewal before the 2019 season, Fox has agreed to air any LCS Game 7 on the broadcast network.

With TBS only holding the rights to half of the postseason beginning in 2014, the network aired games at start times that did not conflict with Fox, ESPN, or MLB Network's coverage of the postseason, and airs Inside MLB following the conclusion of its own coverage instead of at the conclusion of all games on a given day.

Ernie Johnson Jr. has been accused of not playing to his strengths as a broadcaster in his role as TBS's lead play-by-play man. More to the point, Johnson was accused of (in part because of his very conversational announcing style in the booth) never really seeming to be able to capture the transformational moments during his broadcast of the 2014 American League Wild Card Game between the Kansas City Royals and Oakland Athletics. For example, there was Johnson's rather subdued call of Brandon Moss’s second home run that gave Oakland a 5-3 lead in the top of the 6th.

Also during their coverage of 2014 AL Wild Card Game, TBS put a graphic that incorrectly said that Oakland manager Bob Melvin was in his fourth straight playoff appearance, but this was only his third straight (2012, 2013 and 2014). Throughout the evening, TBS's broadcast was cited in not having enough adequate camera angles for replays that provided value to viewers. As opposed to productions that bring extra resources and cameras to playoff games, TBS's broadcast of this particular game was cited as feeling more like a weekly or regional telecast. That was arguably manifested in Kansas City Royals legend George Brett being forced into a "Very Funny" promo.

This was the first year of eight-year contracts for national broadcasts in Canada. Sportsnet, owned by Rogers Communications (and sister company of the Toronto Blue Jays), continues to be the primary rightsholder, retaining rights to the All-Star Game, the Home Run Derby, and most postseason games. In total (including Canada-wide rights to all Blue Jays games which are acquired directly from the team), Sportsnet's various channels will carry almost 300 MLB games per season until 2021. As part of the deal, Rogers Cable became the Canadian launch partner for MLB Network, which was not previously available in Canada, and did not secure carriage on any Canadian providers other than Rogers that year. Despite this, MLB Network's Division Series telecasts were kept exclusive to that channel in Canada as well.

Separately, TSN announced its own eight-year deal to expand its MLB coverage. Having carried ESPN's Sunday Night Baseball since 2010 under sublicense from Sportsnet, TSN and TSN2 will now carry all of ESPN's regular-season coverage (ESPN being a minority partner in TSN), adding Monday Night Baseball and Wednesday Night Baseball, totalling over 75 games per year.

French-language rights, previously held exclusively by TSN's French-language sister channels RDS and RDS2, will now be split with TVA Sports, with each group airing approximately 70 games per season (TVA Sports also carries additional Blue Jays games acquired directly from the team). RDS will continue to carry the All-Star Game and the World Series, but the remaining postseason rights will be split equally between RDS and TVA Sports.

==== Local coverage ====
- Los Angeles Dodgers games moved to the new Time Warner Cable SportsNet LA, which is equally owned between the Dodgers' ownership group and Time Warner Cable.
- As part of their new 25-year deal with existing rights partner Comcast SportsNet Philadelphia, over-the-air Philadelphia Phillies telecasts moved from MyNetworkTV affiliate WPHL-TV to CSN Philadelphia's sister broadcast station WCAU-TV (Philadelphia's NBC owned-and-operated station), which are both owned by Comcast.

=== 2015 ===
For the 2015 season, ESPN introduced a new on-air appearance for baseball. Among its changes were a new, persistent K-Zone Live graphic, consisting of a faded white rectangle that is overlaid live atop the strike zone on the home plate camera angle at all times. A new K-Zone 3D graphic, with ball trails and a three-dimensional box representing the strike zone, can also be used during replays. The new live K-Zone graphic was criticized by viewers and the media for being potentially distracting, drawing comparisons to baseball video games and Fox's "glowing puck" from its NHL coverage.

On August 30, 2015, former softball player Jessica Mendoza joined the Sunday Night Baseball broadcast team as a color commentator. For the 2016 MLB season, former Yankees player Aaron Boone joined Shulman and Mendoza in the broadcast booth as the second color commentator for SNB. Shulman stepped down at the conclusion of the 2017 season, while Boone left the booth after being named new Yankees manager.

During the bottom of the third inning of Game 5 of the 2015 National League Division Series between the New York Mets and Los Angeles Dodgers, TBS's cameras caught a tense exchange between Dodgers manager Don Mattingly and outfielder Andre Ethier. So when TBS went to an interview conducted between innings by Sam Ryan in the Dodgers' dugout with Mattingly, the assumption was that Ryan would ask Mattingly what happened. Ryan then proceeded to ask Mattingly instead, how he thought Zack Greinke was pitching, what he thought of the game so far. Later in the broadcast, Cal Ripken Jr. brought up what we had all seen when Ethier came up to bat again in the fifth, saying, "We’re still guessing what that argument was all about."

In Game 2 of the aforementioned Mets-Dodgers NLDS, Ripken was quick to categorize Chase Utley's slide into Mets shortstop, Rubén Tejada (which broke Tejada's leg) as a clean play, "a little late," and nothing more than "competitive baseball".

Since along with Tom Verducci, succeeding Tim McCarver as Fox's lead color commentator in 2014, Harold Reynolds has been accused contributing to little more superficial, surface-level stuff on telecasts. For example, during Game 5 the 2015 American League Championship Series, when Toronto's Chris Colabello cranked a solo homer in the second, Reynolds' simple contribution was, "Well, I guess he made an adjustment." More to the point, immediately after, Verducci jumped in and explained how that was the first home run that Kansas City starter Edinson Vólquez had allowed in his past 1,228 changeups. Reynolds’ response was "How do you know that? Unbelievable, Tom. You were sitting on that one, weren’t you?"

Fox suffered an outage during their broadcast of Game 1 of the 2015 World Series resulting in a brief delay in the game. After a brief cutaway to the Los Angeles studios (missing one at-bat), Fox picked up the MLB Network-produced feed, which is broadcast to viewers outside the United States. This feed used Fox's #2 announce team of Matt Vasgersian and John Smoltz. After two innings, Fox's #1 crew of Joe Buck, Harold Reynolds and Tom Verducci entered and called the action worldwide. An inning later, Fox had their own broadcast back up and running, with Buck, Reynolds and Verducci refunding to the Fox booth, while Vasgersian and Smoltz re-entered the MLBN booth.

Since 2015, production of the MLB International broadcasts has been assumed by MLB Network. Matt Vasgersian (formerly of Fox and today part of ESPN Sunday Night Baseball in addition to the MLB Network, also former play-by-play television announcer for the San Diego Padres) has served as the play-by-play commentator; for the 2016 World Series onward, he was joined by Buck Martinez (play-by-play analyst of the Toronto Blue Jays for Sportsnet—which has carried the world feeds due to his involvement, and former color commentator for TBS) on color. Since 2018, with Matt now with ESPN part-time in addition to his MLB Network duties, Buck was joined for the All-Star Game duties by former Sunday Night Baseball voice Dan Shulman (who has also been paired with Martinez on selected Blue Jays games).

With the Blue Jays reaching the postseason in 2015 for the first time since 1993, Sportsnet president Scott Moore announced the channel was unable to produce separate Canadian telecasts of the Blue Jays' postseason games, and picked up the U.S. network telecasts of these games as it typically did for its postseason coverage. As in 2014, when the two Division Series games carried by MLB Network in the U.S. was also exclusive to that channel in Canada despite very limited carriage, Game 3 of the Royals-Astros ALDS was exclusive to MLBN in both countries. However Sportsnet aired all games of the Blue Jays-Rangers ALDS in Canada (MLBN carried Game 2 in the United States).

==== Local coverage ====
The Chicago Cubs opted to re-negotiate their terrestrial television contracts for the 2015 season through 2019, when all the Cubs' television rights contracts will expire, including their cable deal with Comcast SportsNet Chicago. WGN-TV will still hold rights to 45 Cubs games per season, and its overflow broadcasts will move to WPWR-TV in place of WCIU-TV. WGN will be joined by ABC-owned station WLS-TV, which will now broadcast 25 games per season. Broadcast Cubs games among the three stations in the market, along with White Sox games (which will also have games move from WCIU to WPWR) will be carried in the Indianapolis market among Media General's duopoly of WISH-TV and WNDY-TV, in addition to a regional network in Iowa and downstate Illinois.

The cable network WGN America will no longer carry Chicago White Sox or Chicago Cubs games, as the network has phased out Chicago sports programming as part of its transition towards becoming a nationally focused entertainment network. This brings an end to the "superstation" era of cable broadcast, started in 1976 when WTCG (later to become WTBS) broadcast Atlanta Braves games, followed by WGN and other stations such as WOR-TV (New York Mets), WSBK-TV (Boston Red Sox) and KTLA (California Angels) airing simulcasts via satellite or cable.

After an absence of over a decade, New York Yankees telecasts will return to WPIX, sharing time with the Mets after WWOR-TV gave up its contract due to the rejection of a contract extension. Both teams' games on WPIX will still be produced by the YES Network and SportsNet New York respectively.

=== 2016 ===
During the 2016 season, TBS debuted a new scoreboard design that was criticized by viewers for its large size. The following season, TBS was criticized again for having initially made its scoreboard too small.

Beginning in 2016, the usually all-news network CNN en Español carries TBS's postseason coverage with the Spanish language audio, though no language adjustments are made to the on-screen graphics. The Spanish audio is also available through TBS's second audio program, and the coverage on CNN en Español is subject to pre-emption for appropriate breaking news coverage.

During the top of the third inning of Game 3 of the 2016 American League Division Series between the Toronto Blue Jays and Texas Rangers, TBS's Matt Winer was doing a live interview with Texas third base coach Tony Beasley, when Rangers shortstop Elvis Andrus hit a home run. Winer had to cut off Beasley during the interview to tell the audience that Andrus got "a double", before then realizing it was a home run. When Andrus finally rounded third base, Winer said, "Excuse me, that's not a double; that's a home run." As a direct result of all of this, there wasn't full screen of the Andrus homer, nor was there a proper play-by-play of the home run.

Following Game 1 of the 2016 World Series, Fox affiliate WJW in Cleveland, which would carry the Cleveland Indians' World Series appearance via Fox, aired a brief commercial criticizing TBS, in light of the mistakes and errors that had run rampant throughout their playoff coverage.

On October 5, 2015, Toronto Blue Jays owner Rogers Communications announced that all Blue Jays home games on Sportsnet during the 2016 season would be broadcast in 4K. On April 14, 2016, it was announced that 25 MLB Network Showcase games would be broadcast in 4K ultra-high definition exclusively on DirecTV in the 2016 season (subject to local blackout restrictions), beginning April 15.

In November 2015, after negotiations surrounding revenue sharing and infrastructural mandates (including a proposed requirement that the games only be available through the league's existing apps), Fox Sports Networks reached a three-year deal with Major League Baseball to allow in-market, authenticated online streaming for eligible pay TV subscribers via Fox Sports Go, of regional telecasts for the sixteen teams it holds rights to, beginning in the 2016 season.

=== 2017 ===
In the 2017 season, ESPN introduced a new camera angle known as "Front Row Cam"; it is designed to provide a "low-home" camera angle, and utilizes a cylindrical camera pointed vertically at a mirror inside an enclosure positioned along the wall behind home plate. During the American League Wild Card Game, ESPN also introduced a new "immersive" K-Zone 3D component, which allows the data to be rendered into a virtual stadium environment to be viewed at different perspectives.

For the 2017 postseason, Fox's MLB coverage unveiled a new graphics package first seen on its NFL telecasts, though the same layout from the 2014 version for the scoring bug continued to be used, with the addition of two statistical panes atop the scoring bug for batter/pitcher matchups, game at-bat results, and individual statistics. Also, the inning indicator, the ball-strike counter and the out counter (which is now back to being numerically represented) were all moved to the bottom of the scoring bug.

=== 2018 ===
The 2018 season saw a revamp of ESPN's lead commentary team, with Matt Vasgersian succeeding Dan Shulman, and Alex Rodriguez joining as analyst. ESPN also anticipated increased use of the Front Row Cam on Sunday Night Baseball, and the immersive K-Zone 3D feature being employed on all games (a move enabled by ESPN's full adoption of on-site graphics and replay systems operated remotely from its main studios in Bristol). ESPN also unveiled a major on-air rebranding for its MLB coverage.

During the 2018 ALDS, analyst Ron Darling apologized after making an insensitive comment about New York Yankees starter Masahiro Tanaka during Game 2 of the Yankees' series against Boston. Early in the broadcast while attempting to point out a weakness of Tanaka’s, Darling said “A little chink in the armor for Tanaka here. It’s the first inning where he’s lost a little of his control.”

During the 2018 World Series John Smoltz was heavily criticized for appearing to hate the direction baseball is going in.

On November 15, 2018, Fox renewed its rights, set to expire in 2022, through 2028. The contract maintains Fox's current coverage structure, but with expanded digital rights, and the commitment to air more games on the Fox broadcast network when the new deal takes effect. Fox also committed to airing at least two of its League Championship Series games, as well as any Game 7, on the broadcast network beginning in 2019; it had been criticized for airing only Game 2 of the 2018 National League Championship Series, while placing the rest on Fox Sports 1.

On September 6, Fox Sports Detroit suspended Detroit Tigers play-by-play announcer Mario Impemba and color commentator Rod Allen for the remainder of the season after an alleged physical altercation that occurred on September 4, in which Allen reportedly placed Impemba in a choke hold at Chicago's Guaranteed Rate Field after a game they called between the Tigers and the Chicago White Sox, a claim Allen's agent has denied. Backup announcers Matt Shepard and Kirk Gibson replaced them for the rest of the season. It was later announced that Impemba and Allen's contracts were not renewed for future seasons, ending their 17 years together as broadcast partners.

=== 2019 ===
In February 2019, Fox announced plans to air two weeks of regional games on Thursday nights in September of that season, in lieu of Saturday games (which creates conflicts with its college football coverage. They will additionally serve as a prelude to Fox's Thursday Night Football broadcasts.

Under an agreement with the U.S. Department of Justice regarding Disney's acquisition of 21st Century Fox, the Fox Sports Regional Networks were required to be sold off to third parties by June 18, 2019. Fox also invoked a clause to give Yankee Global Enterprises the rights to buy their stake back in the YES Network. Including YES, the Fox Sports Regional Networks broadcast games for 15 of the 30 MLB teams. On March 8, YES was sold to a consortium including Yankee Global Enterprises, Amazon, and Sinclair Broadcast Group for $3.5 billion. Then on May 3, Sinclair and Entertainment Studios agreed to purchase the rest of the Fox Sports Regional Networks. The networks continued to use the Fox Sports branding for the rest of the regular season under a transitional license agreement.

WGN-TV broadcasts of Chicago Cubs and White Sox games concluded at the end of the season. WGN held the local broadcast television rights of both teams since 1948. The network's final telecasts took place on September 28 (Cubs) and September 29 (White Sox). Effective with the 2020 season, Cubs games will move exclusively to the new Marquee Sports Network, while White Sox games will air full-time on NBC Sports Chicago.
