= Hot Stove =

American sports television series

- Hot Stove logo since 2012
- Starring: Matt Vasgersian; Harold Reynolds; Lauren Shehadi more below
- Opening theme: "Fire It Up" by Outasight
- Country of origin: United States
- No. of seasons: 5

Production
- Production locations: Studio K, MLB Network Studios, Secaucus, New Jersey, U.S.
- Running time: 1 hour (2009–2011); 2 hours (2012-present)

Original release
- Network: MLB Network (2009–present) simulcast on MLB Network Radio (2010–present)
- Release: January 1, 2009 – present

Related
- MLB Tonight, Quick Pitch

Hot Stove is an offseason baseball talk show that airs on MLB Network and is simulcast on MLB Network Radio. The show offers the coverage of offseason activities including trades, free agent signings, and rumors. It is taped live in "Studio K" of the MLB Network studios in Secaucus, New Jersey. Prior to its restructure to a talk show in 2012, it replaced MLB Tonight as the signature show of the network during the off season. As such it was taped live in Studio 3, but also featured segments taped in Studio 42. The program airs from after the World Series and before spring training.

== Personalities ==
=== Hosts ===
==== Main ====
- Greg Amsinger: (2009–2011)
- Victor Rojas: (2009–2010)
- Matt Vasgersian: (2009–present)
- Matt Yallof: (2009–2011)
- Harold Reynolds: (2012–present)

==== Guest Hosts ====
- Brian Kenny: (November 20–21, 2012)
- Keith Olbermann: (November 20–21, 2012)

=== Analysts ===
- Sean Casey: (2009–2011)
- John Hart: (2009–2011)
- Barry Larkin: (2009–2011)
- Al Leiter: (2009–2011)
- Joe Magrane: (2009–2011)
- Dan Plesac: (2009–2011)
- Harold Reynolds: (2009–2011)
- Billy Ripken: (2009–2011)
- Dave Valle: (2009–2011)
- Mitch Williams: (2009–2014)

=== Reporters ===
- Trenni Kusnierek: (2009–2010)
- Hazel Mae: (2009–2011)
- Lauren Shehadi: (2012–present)
- Heidi Watney: (2012–2021)
- Siera Santos: (2022–present)

=== Insiders ===
- Jon Heyman: (2009–present)
- Tracy Ringolsby: (2009–2011)
- Ken Rosenthal: (2009–2021)
- Tom Verducci: (2009–present)
- Peter Gammons: (2010–present)

=== Commentators ===
- Bob Costas: (2009–2011)

== Hot Stove Awards ==
On February 25, 2011, during the final segment of the final edition of Hot Stove of the season, the first-ever Hot Stove Awards was given according to the best animated features, best original screenplays, and best pictures.
