= MLB on TBS =

MLB baseball cable telecasts (2007–present)

- Also known as: MLB Tuesday on TBS
- Genre: American baseball game telecasts
- Presented by: Brian Anderson; Alex Faust; Ron Darling; Jeff Francoeur; Lauren Shehadi; Adam Lefkoe; Curtis Granderson; Jimmy Rollins; Pedro Martinez (for other commentators and announcers, see below)
- Theme music composer: Mark Willott
- Country of origin: United States
- Original language: English
- No. of seasons: 20 (through 2026 season)

Production
- Executive producers: Jeff Behnke, Glenn Diamond
- Production locations: Various MLB stadiums (game telecasts); Techwood Studios, Atlanta, Georgia (studio segments, pregame and postgame shows)
- Camera setup: Multi-camera
- Running time: 210 minutes or until game ends (inc. adverts)
- Production company: TNT Sports

Original release
- Network: TBS; TruTV (alternate broadcasts and simulcasts); TNT (overflow); HBO Max
- Release: October 1, 2007 – present

Related
- MLB on CBS; Braves TBS Baseball; MLB Tuesday

MLB on TBS is an American presentation of regular season and postseason Major League Baseball (MLB) game telecasts that air on the American pay television network TBS and the streaming service HBO Max. The games are produced by TNT Sports (formerly known as Turner Sports).

== History ==
=== Pre-2007: relationship with the Braves ===
Atlanta Braves baseball games had been a local staple on Atlanta independent station WTBS (channel 17, now WPCH-TV; which, like TBS, was owned by Ted Turner's Turner Broadcasting System) since Turner acquired the team's broadcast rights in 1973, and subsequently gained national prominence when the station was uplinked to satellite in December 1976, becoming one of America's first superstations. Along with Chicago-based WGN-TV and New York-based WWOR-TV, WTBS was one of the few television stations that broadcast local sporting events to a national audience, with some even giving the Braves the title "America's Team".

1983 marked the last time that local telecasts of League Championship Series games were allowed. In 1982, Major League Baseball recognized a problem with this due to the emergence of cable superstations such as WTBS in Atlanta and WGN-TV in Chicago. When TBS tried to petition for the right to do a "local" Braves broadcast of the 1982 NLCS, Major League Baseball got a Philadelphia federal court to ban them on the grounds that as a cable superstation, TBS's telecast would compete with the national broadcast on ABC.

On July 11, 1988, the day before the Major League Baseball All-Star Game from Cincinnati, TBS televised the annual All-Star Gala from the Cincinnati Zoo. Larry King hosted the broadcast with Craig Sager and Pete Van Wieren handling interviews. The broadcast's big draw would have been the Home Run Derby, which TBS intended on taping during the afternoon, and later airing it in prime time during the Gala coverage. The Gala coverage also had some pre-taped features such as highlights from previous All-Star Games, a segment on Cincinnati's baseball history, a video recap of the 1988 season's first half and, a slow-motion highlight montage set to "This Is the Time" by Styx frontman Dennis DeYoung. However, the derby and a skills competition were canceled due to rain. As a result, TBS scrambled to try to fill nearly an hour of now-open airtime. For example, the Gatlin Brothers, the event's musical guests, who had already played a full concert, were asked to come back out and play some more.

Sister network TNT was actually in the running to gain the cable portion of the baseball television rights beginning in 1990. However, ESPN won the final bid with the league.

When Major League Baseball was realigned into three divisions each within the American and National Leagues in 1994, TBS offered Major League Baseball US$40-$45 million a year for rights to another round of postseason games (presumably, matches from the newly created Division Series). Instead, Major League Baseball along with ABC and NBC formed a revenue sharing joint venture called The Baseball Network (which was dissolved after the 1995 season). Meanwhile, CBS was offering $130 million a year to renew its previous contract (a four-year agreement that began in 1990 and ran until 1993) before being shut out, as well.

During NBC's coverage of the 2000 Division Series between the New York Yankees and Oakland Athletics, regular play-by-play announcer Bob Costas decided to take a breather after anchoring NBC's prime time coverage of the Summer Olympic Games from Sydney. In Costas' place was Atlanta Braves announcer Skip Caray, who teamed with Joe Morgan before Costas' return for the ALCS. It was not just Costas but all of NBC's production crews who were down in Sydney. The Olympics ended just two days before the MLB playoffs started that year, so the TBS crew worked the Division Series games for NBC.

In 2003, the Braves telecasts on TBS underwent significant changes for the first time in many years, reflecting an increase in TBS's rights fee payments to Major League Baseball. In turn, national sponsors could fulfill their advertising commitments by purchasing ads on TBS, in addition to ESPN or Fox. In the process, Don Sutton and Joe Simpson assumed duties as lead commentators, while longtime play-by-play announcers Skip Caray and Pete Van Wieren had their participation on the broadcasts reduced. This was done in an attempt to combat criticism of Caray's on-air "home team" bias and to market its baseball coverage to fans of MLB teams other than the Braves. Meanwhile, the brand Braves Baseball on TBS was replaced by MLB on TBS. The move was strongly criticized by Braves fans, Atlanta area media outlets and Braves manager Bobby Cox. Over 90% of Braves fans who voted in an online poll conducted by the Atlanta Journal-Constitution preferred Caray and Van Wieren to the more neutral broadcasts. The move backfired, and ratings for the TBS broadcasts declined sharply. After that year's All-Star break, TBS brought back Caray and Van Wieren to work with the two analysts, while broadcasts reverted to the Braves Baseball on TBS brand the following year.

=== 2007–2021: National postseason and Sunday afternoon games ===
On October 17, 2006, TBS signed an agreement with Major League Baseball which earned TBS exclusive rights to all Division Series playoff games, one of the League Championship Series, as well as rights to the All-Star Selection Show held in late June or early July, from 2007 to 2013. A national Sunday afternoon baseball package was also planned starting with the 2008 season. As a part of the deal, the Turner Broadcasting System management decided to limit Braves games to local telecasts within the Atlanta market. On October 1, 2007, the Turner Broadcasting System severed the ties between WTBS and the TBS cable channel, converting the Atlanta station into an in-market independent station that assumed the call letters WPCH-TV, branding on-air as "Peachtree TV".

Along with this, Comcast and other cable providers within the Atlanta market began carrying the national TBS feed for the first time. WPCH-TV continued to air Braves games, but they were only broadcast within the team's designated market area and throughout Canada; in the latter case, the Canadian Radio-television and Telecommunications Commission never allowed the TBS cable feed to be eligible for carriage on Canadian cable and satellite providers as a superstation, only giving permission for the Atlanta area signal (whose programming largely overlapped with the national version of the channel outside of public affairs and E/I-compliant programming seen only on WTBS). WPCH would lose television rights to the Braves after 40 years in 2013, when Fox Sports South – which took over production responsibilities for the games from Turner Sports after the Meredith Corporation, owner of Atlanta's CBS affiliate WGCL-TV (channel 46), assumed WPCH's operations through a local marketing agreement formed in 2011 – acquired the regional television rights to the station's 45-game package beginning with the 2014 season. All games included a Spanish language play-by-play feed that was transmitted via the SAP audio channel.

For the 2012 and 2013 seasons, TBS was awarded the rights to televise both Wild Card Playoff games that occur the day before the Division Series games. In exchange, MLB Network was awarded the rights to televise two Division Series games, rights that previously belonged to TBS. TBS retained the right to air any tie-breaker games to determine the team that moves onto a Wild Card Playoff game which are considered part of the regular season; this occurred in 2013 with a match-up between the Tampa Bay Rays and Texas Rangers.

==== 2015 contract renewal ====
In 2011, CBS—a former MLB broadcaster from 1990 to 1993—aired two Turner-produced MLB studio specials: the MLB Midseason Report on July 2, 2011, and the postseason preview special MLB 2011: Down the Stretch on September 24. Both specials were aired under the CBS Sports Spectacular branding, and featured the TBS studio panel. In August 2012, The New York Times reported that Turner and CBS Sports were exploring a partnership to bid on the next round of MLB media rights beginning in 2015, similarly to their joint coverage of the NCAA men's basketball tournament that began the previous year. However, it was suggested that CBS would "most likely" be interested in the All-Star Game and World Series only, echoing the league's previous agreement with NBC from 1996 to 2000.

On October 2, 2012, Turner Sports renewed its contract with Major League Baseball through the 2021 season. TBS would retain a non-exclusive late-season package of 13 regular season games on Sunday afternoons, down from 26 under the previous contract, and now co-existing with local broadcasts. Postseason coverage would now be split between TBS, Fox, and MLB Network, with TBS carrying most of the Division Series and Championship Series games for one of the leagues per-season (the American League in even numbered years and the National League in odd numbered years). The opposite league's games, as well as the World Series, would be carried by Fox networks. MLB Network would carry selected games in both the ALDS and NLDS, while rights to the wild card games began to be split between TBS and ESPN, the extra tiebreaker games that previously aired on TBS also moved to ESPN. The contract was valued at $2.8 billion over eight seasons.

=== 2022–present: National postseason and Tuesday night games ===
On September 24, 2020, it was announced that Turner Sports had renewed its rights through 2028 (aligned with the conclusion of Fox's most recent extension). A major change in the contract is the replacement of TBS's late-season Sunday games with a new primetime game on most Tuesday nights beginning in the 2022 season (each season there were 26 games, up from the previous contract of 13). Most of the existing postseason broadcasting arrangements remain in place, however it lost its wild card game to ESPN (due to its renewal and expansion of the wild card series round), with TBS holding rights to two Division Series and the Championship Series for one league annually, and games no longer siphoned to MLB Network (the channel will instead hold the Spanish-language rights to all games aired in English by Turner). Turner Sports is also receiving additional digital rights for Bleacher Report and "additional WarnerMedia platforms". The value of the contract was reported to have increased to $535 million per-season.

During the final month of the 2024 Major League Baseball season, TBS' sister network TruTV will air MLB Race to the Pennant on Tuesday nights. The show will feature a whip-around format hosted by Alanna Rizzo and Yonder Alonso. MLB Tuesday will also air doubleheaders the final three weeks of the season. One of the doubleheaders will feature one game instead on TruTV, marking the first time the network has aired a regular season MLB game in full.

== Viewers and ratings ==
Regular-season viewers
Season	Avg. Viewers	Change	Ref
2008	624,000	—	
2009	614,000	–2%	
2010	557,000	–9%	
2011	556,000	–0%	
2012	448,000	–19%	
2013	375,000	–16%	
2014	309,000	–18%	
2015	413,000	+34%	

== Scheduling ==
TBS typically begins game coverage with the pregame show MLB on TBS Leadoff (formerly MLB on Deck), followed 37 or 38 minutes later by the first pitch of the first game. Each day's coverage ends with MLB on TBS Closer (formerly Inside MLB, which is formatted similarly to sister network TNT's Inside the NBA). TBS does not show commercial breaks after the third and sixth innings (and also after the ninth inning, if the game goes into extra innings). Instead, it airs a "Game Break", which gives the studio host and analysts more airtime (similar to what is done for British television coverage of an American sporting event). The studio shows originate from Studio D at TNT Sports's headquarters in Atlanta, which is also the home for TNT's NBA and NHL coverage.

=== Regular season ===
During the regular season from 2008 to 2021, TBS broadcast a weekly game nationally on Sunday afternoons, under the title Sunday MLB on TBS. These games were not exclusive to TBS and were blacked out in local markets, to protect the stations that held the local broadcast rights to the games. In the affected areas, simulcasts of programming from sister network HLN air in place of the games. Under the deal, TBS could show an alternate game in those markets, but the network did not elect to do so through the 2021 season.

Despite initial reports that TBS would carry games on Memorial Day, Independence Day, and Labor Day, these holiday games are not part of the contract. For many years (until 2021), games on these holidays were shown on ESPN (from 2022 on it airs on MLB on FS1/MLB Network Showcase), but that network has discontinued them, with the occasional exception of when they fell into the regular Sunday/Monday/Wednesday night slots however TBS will air one on Independence Day in 2023 due to it airing on Tuesday.

TBS released a partial schedule of its inaugural slate of Sunday games on February 27, 2008. More games would be added as the season progressed, generally two weeks before each telecast date. TBS has the second pick of game after ESPN.

Consequently, due to its non-exclusivity, highlights of a scheduled Sunday afternoon game that aired on MLB on TBS were not shown on the ESPN baseball highlight show Baseball Tonight, nor were live feeds and highlights of the said game on the MLB.TV subscription service; instead local broadcasts of the scheduled game were shown. However, highlights of an MLB on TBS game did air on the MLB on Fox weekly program This Week in Baseball (until it was canceled in 2011), as well as MLB Tonight on the MLB Network.

Starting with the 2022 season, TBS' weekly games were moved to Tuesday nights, with blackout rules still in effect in the affected teams' local markets, the network has the option to air an early or late game each week (or both if it elects to not air a game on another given week, with the time slot not selected airing on MLB Network). The Tuesday night program was expected to include a 30-minute studio show before and after each game.

=== Postseason ===
Before the postseason, TBS aired any tie-breaker games (until 2014, when all tiebreaker games were moved to ESPN), one of the two wild card games (until 2021 which those games were moved to ESPN due to the expanded postseason) and half of the Divisional games . Should multiple tie-breaking games be played, or if multiple Division Series games are going on at the same time, those additional games air on TBS' sister network, TNT.

From 2007 to 2010, when TBS aired every Division Series game, start times were staggered throughout the day from early afternoon to late primetime. The first game was usually scheduled to start at 1:07 and the last game was usually scheduled for 9:07. If a game ran long (that is the game goes to extra innings), the start of the next game would be shifted to TNT (the game would move back to TBS during the first commercial break after the end of the earlier game, with an announcement from the in-studio crew to switch to TBS). For the LCS round, TBS would show all of the games at a start time pre-set by MLB. All coverage was followed by Inside MLB. This schedule was brought back for 2013 only, except that MLB Network aired the two games scheduled for the early afternoon slot.

In 2007, TBS switched the starts of four games to TNT in the Division Series round because the previous games exceeded the time limit. TNT was also scheduled to air Game 4 of the Diamondbacks-Cubs series, which overlapped with Game 3 of the Red Sox-Angels series, but the former game was not played; the night before, the D-Backs completed a three-game sweep of the Cubs.

With TBS only holding the rights to half of the postseason beginning in 2014, the network aired games at start times that did not conflict with Fox (from 2022 onward), FS1, or MLB Network (until 2021) coverage of the postseason, and airs Inside MLB following the conclusion of its own coverage instead of at the conclusion of all games on a given day.

From 2016 to 2021, the usually all-news network CNN en Español carried TBS's postseason coverage with the Spanish audio, though no language adjustments were made to the on-screen graphics. The Spanish audio was also available through TBS's second audio program, and the coverage on CNN en Español is subject to pre-emption for appropriate breaking news coverage. In 2022, the Spanish-language broadcasts of those games were moved to MLB Network.

For the 2016 American League Championship Series between the Cleveland Indians and Toronto Blue Jays, Sportsnet, a property of Blue Jays owner Rogers Communications, aired all games in Canada using the TBS feeds.

The 2020 regular season was delayed by four months due to the coronavirus pandemic. That July, Major League Baseball announced that they would be expanding the playoffs, with ESPN and TBS gaining the extra games. The 2020 postseason would now have 16 teams and begin with eight best-of-three Wild Card Series preceding the Division Series. All of the new playoff games would be exclusively televised by ESPN and TBS, with ESPN holding exclusive rights to seven of the eight series.

== TNT's involvement ==
TNT was TBS's outlet to air the beginning of LDS games. When the TBS game finishes, the TNT game is switched back to TBS. Beginning in 2025 if a game ran long TruTV would switch to the beginning of a game and TBS would join in later.

However, in 2011 and 2012, and again in 2024, TNT aired its own slate of postseason Division Series games, due to MLB's desire to air fewer LDS games in the early afternoon. 2011 was the first time TNT had ever aired regularly scheduled MLB games. TNT's coverage uses TBS's announcers and production crews with the only difference being the TNT logo in the scorebox replacing the usual TBS logo.

In 2011, TNT aired Tampa Bay Rays–Texas Rangers Game 1, Detroit Tigers–New York Yankees Games 1 and 2, and Milwaukee Brewers–Arizona Diamondbacks Game 3. To clarify, on October 1, 2011, TNT aired Game 2 of the Rays versus the Rangers at 7 p.m. ET, which overlapped with the end of Game 1 of the St. Louis Cardinals versus the Philadelphia Phillies and the continuation of Game 1 of the Tigers versus the Yankees on TBS. (The latter was also to have been Game 2, but Game 1 was suspended after 1 1/2 innings due to rain.) On October 2, it aired the rescheduled Game 2 between the Tigers and the Yankees at 3 p.m. ET, two hours before Game 2 of the Diamondbacks versus the Brewers on TBS. On October 4, it aired Game 3 of the Diamondbacks versus the Brewers at 9:30 p.m. ET, one hour after Game 3 of the Tigers versus the Yankees started on TBS.

In 2012, TNT aired Cincinnati Reds–San Francisco Giants Game 1, and Oakland Athletics–Detroit Tigers Games 4 and 5.

In 2022, TNT was scheduled to air Game 5, if needed, between the Houston Astros and Seattle Mariners in the 2022 American League Division Series. That game was not needed. But, because Game 3 between the Astros and Mariners went into multiple extra innings, the entirety of Game 3 of the ALDS series between the New York Yankees and Cleveland Guardians aired on TNT, with TBS joining in progress.

In 2024, TNT aired Game 4 of the 2024 American League Division Series between the Detroit Tigers and Cleveland Guardians as part of a split doubleheader with TBS and TruTV.

== Announcers ==
=== Current ===
==== Play-by-play ====
- Brian Anderson, primary (2008–present)
- Alex Faust, fill–in/primary (2024–present)
- Brendan Burke, fill-in (2026–present)
- Brandon Gaudin, fill-in (2025–present)

==== Color ====
- Ron Darling, primary (2007–present)
- Jeff Francoeur, primary (2019–present)
- Curtis Granderson, fill-in (2023–present)
- Jimmy Rollins, primary/fill-in (2020–2021, 2025–present),

==== Field reporters ====
- Lauren Shehadi, primary (2017–2022, 2025-present)
- Lauren Jbara, primary (2024–present)

=== Former ===
==== Play-by-play ====
- Dick Stockton, primary/fill-in (2007–2015)
- Ted Robinson, primary (2007)
- Chip Caray, primary (2007–2009)
- Ernie Johnson Jr., primary (2010–2018), fill-in (2020)
- Victor Rojas, primary (2011)
- Matt Vasgersian, fill-in (2011)
- Steve Physioc, fill-in (2012–2013)
- Matt Devlin, fill-in (2013)
- Joe Simpson, primary (2020)
- Rich Waltz, primary (2020)
- Matt Winer, fill-in (2021)
- Bob Costas, primary (2022–2024)
- Don Orsillo, primary/fill-in (2007–2013, 2016–2025)
- Tom McCarthy, fill-in (2025)

==== Color ====
- Joe Simpson, primary/fill-in (2007–2017, 2020)
- Buck Martinez, primary (2007–2013)
- Tony Gwynn, primary (2007–2008)
- Steve Stone, primary (2007)
- Harold Reynolds, primary (2008)
- John Smoltz, primary (2008, 2010–2013)
- David Wells, fill-in (2009–2012)
- Bob Brenly, primary (2009–2013)
- Dennis Eckersley, fill-in/primary (2009–2018)
- Cal Ripken Jr., primary (2012–2016)
- Tom Verducci, primary (2013)
- Pedro Martínez, fill-in (2019)

==== Field reporters ====
- José Mota, primary (2007)
- Marc Fein, primary (2007–2010)
- David Aldridge, primary (2007–2010, 2012–2013)
- Tom Verducci, primary (2008–2012)
- Craig Sager, primary (2008–2013)
- Jaime Maggio, primary (2011, 2014)
- Sam Ryan, primary (2011, 2015–2017)
- Rachel Nichols, primary (2013)
- Matt Winer, primary (2013–2016, 2020–2023)
- Meredith Marakovits- fill-in (2022)
- Hazel Mae, primary/fill-in (2018–2022)
- Emily Jones, primary (2019)
- Alex Chappell, primary (2019)
- Alanna Rizzo, primary (2021)
- Heidi Watney, fill-in (2022)
- Kelly Crull, fill-in (2022)
- Jahmai Webster, fill-in (2022)
- Allie LaForce, primary (2022)
- Jon Morosi, primary (2024)

== Criticism of TBS's coverage ==
TBS's coverage has been met with criticism by some observers. As with TNT's NBA playoff coverage, MLB playoff games on TBS are not made available to local broadcast television stations in the participating teams' designated market areas. Under the previous contract, ESPN was required to make those games available over-the-air in these local markets.

Following the Philadelphia Phillies' victory in the 2009 NLCS, studio host Ernie Johnson went to the podium to present the championship trophy. Upon announcing what a pleasure it was for TBS to cover the series, the Philadelphia fans responded with a heavy barrage of boos, to which Johnson quipped, "Why, thank you."

Fans of the Pittsburgh Pirates, which in 2013, had its first winning season as well as its postseason appearance since 1992, took TBS to task for not broadcasting the traditional pre-game player introductions, "The Star-Spangled Banner", or ceremonial first pitch during their coverage of the National League Wild Card playoff game against the Cincinnati Reds.

Following Game 1 of the 2016 World Series, Fox affiliate WJW in Cleveland, which would carry the Cleveland Indians' World Series appearance via Fox, aired a brief commercial criticizing TBS, in light of the mistakes and errors that had run rampant throughout their playoff coverage.

TBS received criticism for a lengthy in-game interview between reporter Jon Morosi and Baseball Hall of Famer George Brett during the bottom of the 3rd inning of Game 3 of the 2024 American League Division Series between the New York Yankees and Kansas City Royals.

=== Commentators ===
Some sports media critics were critical of the announcers used in the coverage as being more skewed towards the National League than the American League, along with the choice of Chip Caray (who, along the way, was criticized for making factual mistakes during postseason broadcasts) as the lead voice of the network's coverage, as he had only done Braves baseball telecasts during the 2007 season before TBS assumed rights to playoff coverage. In response to such criticisms, Caray said, "It wasn't the job that I had when I came here in the first place. It would be like being a pinch-hitter or being a relief pitcher that works once every ten days. I'm better when I work more." TBS and Caray parted ways following the 2009 playoffs. Ernie Johnson Jr. and Brian Anderson have both since contributed as the lead announcer since 2010.

Besides that of Caray, Dick Stockton's performance has in particular, been subject to criticism. Stockton, for instance, during the 2013 NLDS (St. Louis vs. Pittsburgh) was cited as often misidentifying players, generally appearing confused at times, and never having hosting chemistry with his analyst Bob Brenly. Meanwhile, Joe Simpson, who was the only holdover from the Braves TBS Baseball days, has been accused of not really adding anything to the booth and often deferring to John Smoltz during their time together on the 2013 Boston–Tampa Bay series.

Ernie Johnson Jr., meanwhile, has been accused of not playing to his strengths as a broadcaster in his role as TBS's lead play-by-play man. More to the point, Johnson was accused of (in part because of his very conversational announcing style in the booth) never really seeming to be able to capture the big, exciting, transformational moments during his broadcast of the 2014 American League Wild Card Game between the Kansas City Royals and Oakland Athletics. For example, there was Johnson's rather subdued call of Brandon Moss’s second home run that gave Oakland a 5-3 lead in the top of the 6th.

During the bottom of the third inning of Game 5 of the 2015 National League Division Series between the New York Mets and Los Angeles Dodgers, TBS's cameras caught a tense exchange between Dodgers manager Don Mattingly and outfielder Andre Ethier. So when TBS went to an interview conducted between innings by Sam Ryan in the Dodgers' dugout with Mattingly, the assumption was that Ryan would ask Mattingly what happened. Ryan then proceeded to ask Mattingly instead, how he thought Zack Greinke was pitching, and what he thought of the game so far. Later in the broadcast, Cal Ripken Jr. brought up what we had all seen when Ethier came up to bat again in the fifth, saying, "We’re still guessing what that argument was all about."

In Game 2 of the aforementioned Mets-Dodgers NLDS, Ripken was quick to categorize Chase Utley's slide into Mets shortstop, Rubén Tejada (which broke Tejada's leg) as a clean play, "a little late," and nothing more than "competitive baseball".

During the 2018 ALDS, analyst Ron Darling apologized after making an insensitive comment about New York Yankees starter Masahiro Tanaka during Game 2 of the Yankees' series against Boston. Early in the broadcast while attempting to point out a weakness of Tanaka's, Darling said “A little chink in the armor for Tanaka here. It’s the first inning where he’s lost a little of his control.”

Bob Costas provided the play-by-play commentary on TBS for the 2024 American League Division Series between the New York Yankees and Kansas City Royals, receiving criticism for his monotonic delivery and perceived lack of interest in the events on the field.

=== Technical difficulties and other miscues ===
TBS was unable to air most of the first inning of Game 6 of the 2008 American League Championship Series, airing a rerun of The Steve Harvey Show (which TBS held rights to at the time) in its place. TBS began airing the game just prior to the last out in the bottom of the first, with announcer Chip Caray apologizing to viewers for "technical difficulties." TBS acknowledged there was a problem with one of the routers used in the broadcast transmission of the relay of the telecast from Atlanta.

During the network's coverage of Game 1 of the 2011 American League Division Series between the Texas Rangers and Tampa Bay Rays, TBS was alleged to have featured doctored headlines with incorrect attributions. On October 1, during the middle of an at-bat during Game 1 of the 2011 ALDS between the New York Yankees and Detroit Tigers, TBS suddenly cut to an ALDS game between the Tampa Bay Rays and the Texas Rangers, which was airing on TNT, for about 14 seconds. Moments later (as TBS was coming out of a replay and showing the Tigers' dugout), cameras missed Yankees right fielder Nick Swisher making a diving catch (instead showing Yankees pitcher Iván Nova walking off the mound and pumping his fist). TBS (in particular, throughout their coverage of the 2011 postseason) has also been criticized for placing the center-field camera precisely in the center. Therefore, every time a pitcher began his windup, his head would block the view of home plate.

During the 2012 American League playoffs, TBS was criticized for its graphics and game preview packages. At the start of its coverage of the American League Wild Card Game between the Baltimore Orioles and Texas Rangers, a graphical snafu resulted in Cal Ripken Jr., who was calling the game, being credited as "Carl Ripken Jr." During Game 1 of the American League Championship Series between the New York Yankees and Detroit Tigers, TBS showed a graphic depicting players who played in the postseason before the age of 24 and after the age of 40. In the graphic, Willie Mays's name was misspelled as "Willie Mayes".

During their coverage of 2014 AL Wild Card Game, TBS put a graphic that incorrectly said that Oakland manager Bob Melvin was in his fourth straight playoff appearance, but this was only his third straight (2012, 2013 and 2014). Throughout the evening, TBS's broadcast was cited in not having enough adequate camera angles for replays that provided value to viewers. As opposed to productions that bring extra resources and cameras to playoff games, TBS's broadcast of this particular game was cited as feeling more like a weekly or regional telecast. That was arguably manifested in Kansas City Royals legend George Brett being forced into a "Very Funny" promo.

During the top of the third inning of Game 3 of the 2016 American League Division Series between the Toronto Blue Jays and Texas Rangers, TBS's Matt Winer was doing a live interview with Texas third base coach Tony Beasley, when Rangers shortstop Elvis Andrus hit a home run. Winer had to cut off Beasley during the interview to tell the audience that Andrus got "a double", before then realizing it was a home run. When Andrus finally rounded third base, Winer said, "Excuse me, that's not a double; that's a home run." As a direct result of all of this, there was no full screen of the Andrus homer, nor was there a proper play-by-play of the home run.

During the 2016 season, TBS debuted a new scoreboard design that was criticized by viewers for its large size. The following season, TBS was criticized again for having initially made its scoreboard too small.

Early into TBS's broadcast of Game 2 of the 2024 American League Division Series between the Cleveland Guardians and Detroit Tigers, TBS experienced outages, where the picture went dark. According to TBS, the issue was caused by Solar Satellite Interference or a 'sun outage' or 'sunspot'. This occurs when the sun's solar activity disrupts satellite signals.

== Presentation ==
=== Music ===
The theme is composed by Mark Willott.

=== Digital on-screen graphics ===
Before TBS gained rights to broadcast MLB postseason games in 2007, TBS used a score bug on the top left-hand corner of the screen for its Braves telecasts. It was upgraded midway through the 2004 season and used through 2007.

==== 2007–2010 ====
The on-screen score graphic during this period covered the entire top of the screen, unlike the Braves TBS Baseball graphic, which only took up the left half of the top. The look is almost identical to that used during Fox's baseball coverage, except that the illustration of the basepaths is near the left side of the screen instead of flushed on the right. The batting order starting lineup used beginning in 2008 resembles that of a cellphone. There is also a pitch tracker that can only be seen on the network's high-definition feed.

==== 2011–2015 ====
With the start of the 2011 postseason, TBS planned to introduce the following

- Bloomberg Stats: TBS would use Bloomberg Stats as means to integrate comprehensive statistical information into each telecast.
- Liberovision: An innovative 3D interactive telestrator meant to give fans a new perspective of instant replays.
- New graphics that intend to feature improved functionality with a nostalgic feel.
- Pitch Trax: An in-game technology that illustrates pitch location throughout the games.

TBS's standard definition feed now airs a letterboxed version of the native HD feed during game broadcasts to match Fox's default widescreen SD presentation, allowing the right side pitch tracking graphic to be seen by those viewing the SD feed.

==== 2016–2026 ====
At the beginning of the 2016 season, TBS introduced new graphics that were used all season, including the postseason.

The score box, which was originally docked to the top and left edges of the screen, was completely redesigned for 2017 after much criticism during the 2016 postseason for its large size. Like the 2016 score bug, the current one still stands in the top left corner, only it is smaller.

In 2020, the score bug was moved to the bottom left corner. For the 2021 postseason, the score bug was moved back to the top left corner. In 2024, the score bug began using the TNT Sports logo instead of TBS as part of the broadcast's integration with TNT Sports. The TBS logo returned to the score bug in the postseason (even with TNT televised games the TBS logo is still presented), but in the 2025 postseason, they used the TNT Sports logo instead.

==== 2026–present ====
TNT Sports debuted a new MLB scorebug during the 2026 postseason, featuring a more compact and streamlined design.

Records
Preceded by None	Major League Baseball pay television carrier 2007–present with ESPN (2007–present) with FS1 (2014–present) with Apple TV+ (2022–present) with Peacock/NBCSN (2022–2023 and 2026–present) with The Roku Channel (2024–2025) with Netflix (2026–present)	Succeeded by Incumbent
