= Quick Pitch (TV series) =

- Starring: Abby Labar (weekdays); Siera Santos (fill-in); Erika Wachter (fill-in)
- Opening theme: 2017 "HandClap" by Fitz and the Tantrums; 2009–2016 "Crowd Chant" by Joe Satriani
- Country of origin: United States
- No. of seasons: 18
- No. of episodes: approx. 3,240 (180 per season)

Production
- Running time: 60 minutes (including commercials)

Original release
- Network: MLB Network
- Release: April 6, 2009 – present

Quick Pitch is an American television show centered on showing highlights of baseball games from the previous night. Quick Pitch airs on MLB Network during the MLB regular season at 1 A.M. ET every weeknight (or earlier if there are fewer than three west coast games) and after Saturday Night Baseball or MLB Tonight every Saturday of Quick Pitch are shown overnights and mornings during the regular season.

== Format ==
Quick Pitch is set in MLB Network's Studio 21 with the host(s) standing on set. The show typically consists of highlights, but major stories such as contract signings, trades or player retirements are also covered. Usually after each highlight, the starting pitchers for the teams' next game are shown.

A unique trait of Quick Pitch is that in the highlights, they use the television or radio announcers' call of the game instead of the host commentating every play.

Quick Pitch is similar in format to the ESPN show SportsCenter but covers baseball exclusively.

== Hosts ==
From 2009 to 2010, Quick Pitch was primarily hosted by Hazel Mae, with Matt Yallof also hosting. For the 2011 season, Mae and Yallof moved to a new afternoon program, The Rundown. Newly hired anchor Paul Severino anchored the Monday and Wednesday editions of the show in 2011, and fellow newly hired anchor Ahmed Fareed anchored Thursday-Sunday that same year. Lisa Kerney served as a frequent Sunday night and fill-in anchor in 2011. With the addition of several new reporters, the hosting work of Quick Pitch was split between five different anchors in 2012, including Fareed, Severino, Greg Amsinger, Scott Braun, and Alanna Rizzo, with Sam Ryan acting as a fill-in anchor.

Due to the typical lack of MLB Tonight on Tuesday nights in 2011 because of doubleheader live game coverage, MLB Network used an anchor-analyst format for Quick Pitch on the Tuesday edition, which was nicknamed "Two-fer Tuesday" for this reason. Greg Amsinger hosts and Dan Plesac provided analysis for the first edition, then different combinations subsequently.

On June 23, 2011, Quick Pitch experimented with a "Three-fer Thursday" version of Quick Pitch in which host Ahmed Fareed was joined by analysts Dan Plesac and Harold Reynolds. The most likely reason for this experiment was the short 5-game MLB schedule on that particular day, resulting in a lack of highlights to air. Since the show runs for a full hour regardless of the number of games, the analysts filled up time in the show with in-depth discussion and analysis. In previous years, this extra time had to be filled by long-form recorded segments due to the single-host format of the show. Having analyst(s) on the program has been common since mid-2011; analyst(s) host the show alongside an anchor one or twice each week, usually on Wednesdays and/or Thursdays. The other days of the week still feature solo-anchored editions of the show.

On August 3, 2012, Intentional Talk hosts Kevin Millar and Chris Rose hosted a "One Night Special" edition of Quick Pitch during one of the hosts' monthly visits to the MLB Network studios. After presenting highlights from the nine games of the day, they hosted a "Kevin's Highlights" segment, a segment normally featured on Intentional Talk.

In 2013, Heidi Watney became the full-time host of Quick Pitch and the show was moved from Studio 42 to Studio 3. Watney hosted Quick Pitch during weeknights, while on weekends, Rizzo and Ryan hosted. Also from 2013 on, it did not feature analyst(s) as it had been the previous two years (2011 and 2012).

In 2015, the show moved from Studio 3 to the newly christened Studio 21. While Watney and Ryan maintained their duties, Rizzo left to join the Los Angeles Dodgers broadcast team (though she later returned to MLB Network as the co-host of High Heat with Chris Russo).

Following Sam Ryan's departure from MLB Network in June 2018, Jamie Hersch (from the NHL Network, MLBN's sister channel) replaced the former as weekend host. Kelly Nash currently (2022) hosts Quick Pitch on weekends and occasional weekdays, with occasional fill-ins from Hersch as well as fellow NHL Network personalities Jackie Redmond, Erika Wachter, and Lauren Gardner (who joined the MLB Network in 2019 and is the current host of Off Base). Alexa Datt (who also worked at NHL Network) also filled in occasionally until her departure in 2021 (when she joined Bally Sports Midwest).

Following Watney's departure after the 2021 season, Siera Santos and Keiana Martin became the show's new main hosts in 2022. In 2023 Martin became the primary host after Santos became the lead host of Intentional Talk, though Santos still hosts Quick Pitch on occasion. In late July 2023, Marquee Sports reporter Taylor McGregor made her first appearance as a fill-in.

After Martin left MLB Network following the 2023 season to join CBS Sports Network, Abby Labar became the primary host for the 2024 season. During the 2024 season, Sunday editions were discontinued in favor of MLB Tonight Sunday Scorecard.
