= Braves TBS Baseball =

- Also known as: Braves Baseball on TBS
- Presented by: Skip Caray; Pete Van Wieren; Joe Simpson; Don Sutton; Ernie Johnson; Chip Caray (for other commentators and announcers, see below)
- Theme music composer: Edd Kalehoff
- Opening theme: "Checkmate"
- Country of origin: United States
- Original language: English
- No. of seasons: 35 (through 2007 season)

Production
- Production locations: Atlanta–Fulton County Stadium and Turner Field (Atlanta Braves home games); Various MLB venues (when the Braves played on the road)
- Camera setup: Multi-camera
- Running time: 210 minutes or until game ended (inc. adverts)
- Production companies: Major League Baseball; Turner Sports

Original release
- Network: TBS
- Release: April 6, 1973 – September 30, 2007 (occasional broadcasts as part of leaguewide package since)

Related
- MLB on TBS

Braves TBS Baseball (or Braves Baseball on TBS) is an American presentation of regular season Major League Baseball (MLB) game telecasts featuring the Atlanta Braves National League franchise that aired on the American cable and satellite network TBS. The games were produced by Turner Sports, the sports division of the Turner Broadcasting System subsidiary of Time Warner, TBS's corporate parent. The program, which debuted in 1973, ended national broadcasts in 2007.

TBS phased out its national coverage of Braves baseball after it was awarded an MLB-wide national broadcast contract effective in 2008. WPCH-TV, the rebranded former originating signal of the TBS superstation feed, retained Atlanta-market rights to a partial schedule of Braves games through 2013, but primary rights moved to cable regional sports networks, eventually settling with Fox Sports South (ultimately FanDuel Sports Network South). The broadcasts on channel 17 in Atlanta eventually returned in the 2025 season, as a simulcast of selected games from FanDuel Sports Network South; these broadcasts continued into 2026 as the team's rights transitioned to BravesVision. The telecasts on channel 17 had exclusive pregame and postgame shows, and the games were syndicated to other television markets in the Braves' designated territory.

As part of the current contract with MLB, TBS selects Braves games for national broadcast on equal grounds with other MLB clubs, but their national broadcast are blacked out in the Braves' MLB-designated territory if BravesVision carries the game as well.

== History ==
=== 1970s ===
Coverage of the Atlanta Braves was perhaps TBS's signature program during its early years. Ted Turner – who had purchased WJRJ-TV (channel 17) in January 1970 (changing its call letters to WTCG shortly after the sale was finalized), when the station was simply a UHF independent station available primarily within the Atlanta market – shocked Atlanta media observers by acquiring the rights to Braves games after the 1972 season, taking them from NBC affiliate WSB-TV (channel 2, now an ABC affiliate), which had carried the team's games since the Braves moved to Atlanta from Milwaukee in 1966 (WSB-TV's sister AM radio station held the radio broadcast rights to the games for years afterward). The acquisition of television rights to the Braves was particularly striking given that WTCG had experienced major profit losses ever since Turner took over the station; channel 17's revenue was only then starting to break even and the station became more competitive among the Atlanta market's television outlets ratings-wise. Braves games began airing on WTCG during the 1973 season.

Even more astonishing, a few years later, Turner would buy the team outright before the 1976 season, mainly to keep a programming staple of his in Atlanta. Before the purchase, rumors had spread alleging that the Braves' owners were looking to move the franchise to another city, following dismal stadium attendance during the 1974 and 1975 seasons, after the excitement of Hank Aaron hitting his then-record-breaking 715th home run (on April 8, 1974) wore off.

During the 1970s, Turner syndicated live games to stations (mostly major network affiliates, as the region had few independent stations) throughout Georgia and adjoining states, including Turner-owned WRET (now WCNC-TV) in Charlotte, North Carolina, as WSB-TV had previously done. Usually, the Sunday afternoon game and one game that aired during prime time were provided to these stations, with mid-week game telecasts airing mainly during the summer, when the major networks were airing reruns, a normal practice among the other MLB teams during that era. Also by the mid-1970s, WTCG had already become available on many cable systems in Georgia, Alabama and South Carolina via microwave relay transmission by the mid-1970s, giving the team even further television exposure to its loyal fanbase in the South.

A landmark event for WTCG occurred on December 17, 1976, when Turner uplinked the station's signal to the Satcom 1 satellite for distribution to cable providers throughout the United States; as a result, Braves telecasts began airing nationally with the 1977 season. When WTCG reached a significant penetration of Southern U.S. households with cable television service around 1978–1979, Turner discontinued syndicating the team's game broadcasts, making the Braves the first team not to provide live coverage of its games to broadcast television stations outside of those within the team's home market.

Turner once famously tried to get Andy Messersmith to use his #17 jersey to promote Superstation WTBS during its early years; the back of the jersey read, "CHANNEL 17." Major League Baseball immediately stopped this plan as, according to MLB rules in place at the time, team jerseys were not allowed to incorporate advertisements other than that of the jersey's manufacturer.

=== 1980s and early 1990s ===
During the 1980s and 1990s, the Braves game telecasts on TBS received high ratings, usually garnering around a 2.0 or sometimes an even higher ratings share. During this time, TBS' expanding presence on cable and satellite led to Braves broadcasts reaching a growing audience across the U.S. and even in Canada. Over time, the club developed a sizable out-of-market fanbase (particularly in locales outside existing MLB markets) leading to the station referring to the franchise as "America's team" in a promotional campaign.

WTBS petitioned for the rights to produce a locally originated broadcast of the 1982 National League Championship Series, in which the Braves played against the St. Louis Cardinals. Following a decision from the Third Circuit U.S. Court of Appeals in Philadelphia, Major League Baseball blocked it from carrying the series on the grounds that as a cable superstation, TBS could not have the rights to a national telecast that competed with network coverage of the NLCS, which was carried that year by ABC. After the 1983 season, Major League Baseball no longer permitted local television stations to produce their own League Championship Series broadcasts (a point made moot by the fact that the games were already available over-the-air).

In 1997, TBS began to collect subscriber fees directly from cable providers, effectively resulting in the national feed operating under the conventions of a conventional basic cable network, though it still technically was designated as a superstation. In exchange, TBS began to lease advertising slots to providers to carry local commercial inserts; as a result, the TBS superstation feed began to televise fewer regular season Atlanta Braves games to a national audience.

=== 2000s ===
==== 2003 ====
In 2003, the Braves telecasts on TBS underwent significant changes for the first time in many years. Don Sutton and Joe Simpson assumed duties as lead commentators, while longtime play-by-play announcers Skip Caray and Pete Van Wieren had their roles on the broadcasts reduced. The telecasts were also rebranded from Braves Baseball on TBS to Major League Baseball on TBS (before reverting to the previous title the following year).

These changes reflected an increase in TBS's rights fee payments to Major League Baseball. In turn, national sponsors could fulfill their advertising commitments by purchasing ads on TBS, in addition to ESPN or Fox. The move was strongly criticized by Braves fans, Atlanta area media outlets and team manager Bobby Cox. Over 90% of Braves fans who voted in an online poll conducted by the Atlanta Journal-Constitution newspaper preferred the team of Caray and Van Wieren to the more neutral broadcasts. The move backfired, and ratings for the TBS broadcasts declined sharply. After that year's All-Star break, TBS brought back Caray and Van Wieren to work with the two analysts.

==== Braves TBS Xtra ====
Beginning in 2004, some TBS telecasts (mostly those airing on Fridays or Saturdays) became more enhanced. TBS branded its interactive telecasts as Braves TBS Xtra, which Braves broadcaster Skip Caray would refer to simply as "one of those super duper telecasts". Enhancements featured in the broadcasts included a catcher cam, Xtra Motion showing the type of pitch and its movement, and the leadOff Line. Often, a guest analyst would join the main announcers in the broadcast booth; telecasts also featured inside access to players including discussions between players and coaching staff while the game was ongoing.

==== 2006 ====
While just carrying 70 Braves games on TBS, the Turner Broadcasting System sold Turner South to Fox Sports, and allowed them keep the games (Turner South had been carrying Braves games in order to ensure that the channel would receive wide distribution in the Southeastern United States). Afterward, Braves game presentations on Turner South (which was rebranded as SportSouth later that year to distinguish it from its new sister network) and FSN South adopted a uniform on-air appearance and began using the same announcers. FSN South's 25-game package (with telecasts usually airing on Wednesdays) is a vestige of its days as the former SportSouth (which was launched by Turner in the early 1990s), as well as a means to ensure that ESPN's game broadcasts would generally be the only one televised nationwide on Wednesdays without requiring a subscription to the MLB Extra Innings out-of-market sports package.

As a result of Turner's decision to allow FSN to broadcast over 85 games per season, TBS no longer served as the Braves' primary broadcaster. Coupled with the impending sale of the team, Pete Van Wieren stated, "It's like an end of an era." At the end of the 2006 season, Turner Sports decided not to renew analyst Don Sutton's contract with the network, while Ron Gant joined FSN South/SportSouth on a full-time basis; as a result, Joe Simpson would be the main analyst for all Braves telecasts.

==== High definition ====
During the 2006 season, all Braves home games airing on TBS began to be broadcast in high definition over the digital signal of WTBS within the Atlanta and on cable providers throughout the Southeastern United States (such as Comcast and Charter Communications). The cable deals were not renewed as none of the TBS home games were broadcast in HD during the 2007 season (all home games airing on FSN South/SportSouth were presented in HD on both cable and satellite).

==== End of broadcasts, subsequent local coverage ====
The 2007 season marked the last year that Braves baseball games aired on TBS over a fully national feed, covering 70 Braves games as in recent years. In June 2007, it was announced that WTBS would break away from TBS and relaunch as an autonomous independent station known as WPCH-TV "Peachtree TV", which would exclusively serve the Atlanta area. This came as Turner Sports acquired rights to a new national MLB package beginning in the 2007 postseason, which would see TBS become the exclusive broadcaster of all Division Series games and one League Championship Series (alternating with Fox) annually, and a package of weekly Sunday afternoon games beginning in the 2008 season.

After 32 years, the final Braves baseball telecast on TBS aired on September 30, 2007, in which the Braves lost in an away game against the Houston Astros, 3–0. During the final broadcast, play-by-play announcer Skip Caray thanked fans saying, "To all you people who have watched the Braves for these 30 years ... thank you. We appreciate you more than you will ever know. ... Thank you folks and God bless you. And we're going to miss you every bit as much as you miss us."

WPCH would continue to air a package of 45 regional Braves games beginning in the 2008 season; outside of Atlanta, the games were broadcast by Comcast/Charter Sports Southeast. In 2011, production of the games was transferred from Turner Sports to Fox Sports after Turner relinquished operations of WPCH to Meredith Corporation under a local marketing agreement; outside of Atlanta, the broadcasts moved to SportSouth (now FanDuel Sports Network Southeast). In 2013, Fox Sports South (now FanDuel Sports Network South) acquired exclusive rights to the 45 games that were previously aired on broadcast television, ending WPCH's relationship with the Braves after 40 years.

In 2025, the Braves returned to channel 17 as part of a package backed by WPCH's current owner Gray Media; the package, branded as Braves on Gray, consisted of spring training games produced by Gray's Raycom Sports unit, and a package of regular season games simulcast from FanDuel Sports Network South. The games aired on WPCH and a network of Gray stations across the team's market region. With the impending closure of FanDuel Sports Network in 2026, the Braves took their broadcast rights in-house for the first time since the Turner era, and established a new part-time channel known as BravesVision. The team partnered with Gray and Raycom to provide production support to the network, with WPCH/WANF and the Gray network carrying 25 games on broadcast television.

The Braves paid homage to TBS as part of the throwback City Connect jerseys it introduced for the 2026 season, which feature a baby blue color scheme similar to its jerseys from the 1970s and 80s, as well as an "ATL" insignia resembling one of TBS's past logos.

== On-air staff ==
=== Former on-air staff ===
- Hank Aaron - analyst (1980)
- Erin Andrews - host (2001–2003)
- Chip Caray - play-by-play announcer (2005–2007)
- Skip Caray - play-by-play announcer (1976–2007)
- Darrell Chaney (1982) - analyst
- Marc Fein - host (2004–2007)
- Ron Gant - analyst (2004–2006)
- Milo Hamilton - play-by-play announcer (1973–1975)
- Ernie Johnson Sr. - play-by-play announcer/analyst (1973–1999)
- Ernie Johnson Jr. - host (1993–1996)
- Dave O'Brien - play-by-play announcer (1990–1991)
- Billy Sample - analyst (1988–1989)
- Joe Simpson - analyst (1992–2007)
- John Sterling - play-by-play announcer (1982–1987)
- Don Sutton - analyst (1989–2006)
- Pete Van Wieren - play-by-play announcer (1976–2006)

== Blackouts ==
Due to broadcasting restrictions imposed by Major League Baseball, most Braves games airing on TBS were blacked out within about 35 to 50 miles (56 to 80 km) air miles of the opposing team's stadium, meaning games that were available on local television (except for within the Atlanta area, where WTBS was the exclusive station for Atlanta Braves games that did not air on FSN South or SportSouth) were not seen on local cable providers within the blackout region. This blackout rule was somewhat less restrictive than that for ESPN, which covers the entirety of a team's designated market area.

== See also ==
- 2021 National League Championship Series
