= Jamie Hersch =

American sports journalist

- Born: May 25, 1987 (age 39); Champlin, Minnesota, U.S.
- Education: University of Southern California
- Occupation: Sports journalist
- Employer: NHL Network · MLB Network

Jamie Hersch (born May 25, 1987) is an American journalist formerly for the NHL Network and the MLB Network, where she hosted the NHL Network show On the Fly and on an occasion the MLB Network version Quick Pitch. She currently works for the Las Vegas Golden Knights.

== Early life and education ==
Hersch was born and raised in Champlin, Minnesota, where she spent time figure skating. Her mom was a speech/language pathologist with the Anoka-Hennepin school district's early intervention program. Hersch was first interested in broadcasting by watching Michele Tafoya on Monday Night Football. Hersch started covering sports events in high school. She graduated from Champlin Park High School in 2005. She graduated from the University of Southern California magna cum laude in 2009 with a degree in broadcast journalism. While at USC, Hersch covered the USC athletic teams, had a number of positions at the campus TV Station, and was third place in 2009 Hearst Broadcast Competition winning one thousand dollars.

== Career ==
Hersch started her career in WKOW-TV in Madison, Wisconsin. Then in 2013, came back home when she hired by Fox Sports North (now Bally Sports North) to cover the Minnesota Twins and Minnesota Wild. During her time with Fox Sports North, Hersch traveled to Kuwait to cover several former NHL players who brought hockey to the American troops serving overseas. They spent several days living at Camp Buehring with the soldiers while running hockey skills clinics and playing floor hockey games on the base. In 2015, when the MLB Network and the NHL Network paired up, she joined the networks. Hersch announced her departure from the MLB Network during the 21 September 2024 edition of MLB Network's Quick Pitch. She also spent some time covering sports for the Big Ten Network. In 2025, she was hired by the Las Vegas Golden Knights to join their broadcast team.

== Personal Life ==
Hersch is married with two kids: a son named Brooks Russell (born April 22, 2019) and a girl named Cadence Marciana (born July 22, 2021). She is a fan of the Minnesota Twins and the Minnesota Wild.
