= MLB Tonight =

- Starring: Greg Amsinger; Matt Vasgersian; Harold Reynolds; Dan Plesac; Al Leiter; Billy Ripken; Tom Verducci more below
- Opening theme: "MLB Tonight" by E.S. Posthumus
- Country of origin: United States
- No. of seasons: 5
- No. of episodes: 900 (180 episodes per season)

Production
- Running time: 1 hour (offseason), 2 hours (regular season weekdays), 7 hours (regular season Sundays)

Original release
- Network: MLB Network (2009–present) simulcast on MLB Network Radio (2010–present)
- Release: February 20, 2009 – present

Related
- Hot Stove, Quick Pitch

MLB Tonight is the signature program that airs on MLB Network and is simulcast on MLB Network Radio. The show offers complete coverage of all Major League Baseball games from 6 pm ET – 1 am ET during the regular season, and gives news from all 30 MLB teams during the offseason. It is taped live in Studio 3 of the MLB Network facility in Secaucus, New Jersey, but also features segments taped in Studio 42. The program aired from the beginning of Spring Training to the end of the World Series and was replaced in the offseason by Hot Stove, until it started to air in the offseason, and Hot Stove became MLB Network's weekday morning show. The show won the Sports Emmy Award for best Daily Outstanding Studio Show for 2010, 2011, 2012, 2014 and 2015.

== Air times ==
MLB Tonight airs seven days per week, starting at 6 pm ET on weekdays until the last MLB game of the night has ended. MLB Tonight is followed by Quick Pitch, MLB Network's highlights show of record.

On Saturdays, the show airs before and/or after the Saturday Night Baseball game. In 2012, the Sunday edition of MLB Tonight was expanded to air from 1 pm to 8 pm ET.

== Personalities ==
=== Hosts ===
- Greg Amsinger: (2009–present)
- Scott Braun: (2011–2023)
- Brian Kenny: (2011–present)
- Matt Vasgersian: (2009–present)
- Matt Yallof: (2009–present)
- Fran Charles: (2013–2023)
- Adnan Virk: (2019–present)

=== Analysts ===
- Sean Casey: (2009–present)
- Ron Darling: (2013–present)
- John Hart: (2009–present)
- Al Leiter: (2009–present)
- Mike Lowell: (2011–present)
- Dan Plesac: (2009–present)
- Harold Reynolds: (2009–present)
- Billy Ripken: (2009–present)
- Dave Valle: (2009–present)
- Pedro Martinez: (2015–present)
- Yonder Alonso: (2021–present)
- Ryan Dempster: (2014–present)
- Dan O'Dowd: (2015–present)
- Carlos Peña: (2014–present)
- Buck Showalter: (2019–present)
- Jim Thome: (2014–present)
- Chris Young: (2021–present)
- Hunter Pence: (2022–present)

=== Reporters ===
- Sam Ryan (2011–2018)

=== Insiders ===
- Jon Heyman: (2009–present)
- Ken Rosenthal: (2009–2021)
- Tom Verducci: (2009–present)
- Peter Gammons: (2010–present)
- Jon Morosi: (2016–present)
- Joel Sherman: (2009–present)
- Jayson Stark: (2019–present)

=== Commentators ===
- Bob Costas: (2009–present)
- Matt Vasgersian: (2009–present)

== Segments ==
- Capital One Premier Play: This segment shows viewers the key plays of certain games, similar to the "Web Gems" segment on ESPN's Baseball Tonight. (Although it occasionally features offensive plays and completion of no-hitters.) This segment is also featured on Quick Pitch.
- Clubhouse Confidential: With sabermetrics continually at the forefront of baseball conversations, Clubhouse Confidential with Brian Kenny serves as an open forum to discuss and debate topics using modern statistical research and value projection.
- Inside Info: This is an interview segment with one of the Baseball Insiders.
- Inside the Park: This segment features live coverage of an ongoing game.
- Update: A brief update of an ongoing game, which includes a certain key play (such as a double play, a strikeout, a home run, etc.).
- 7 Minute Stretch: A period of seven minutes (or longer) in which the host and analysts play highlights of games that ended or are in progress, and announce news. The 7-minute clock is stopped when they go Inside the Park or interview a player following the game.

== On Deck Circle ==
On Deck Circle logo used in 2017

On Deck Circle is a special 1-hour pre-game version of MLB Tonight airs leading up to the night's MLB Network Showcase. It is filmed from the same studios as MLB Tonight, however, will also include interviews from the stadium with the night's sideline host, and analytics from the night's play-by-play and analyst in the booth. It also includes the same highlights and analysis as MLB Tonight to fill time.

== See also ==
- Baseball Tonight
- MLB Whiparound
- NBA Gametime Live
- NHL Tonight
