= MLB Whiparound =

- Starring: Chris Myers (main host); Kevin Burkhardt (main host); Joel Klatt (secondary host); Lindsay Czarniak (secondary host); Frank Thomas; Eric Karros; Pete Rose; Dontrelle Willis; Nick Swisher; Alex Rodriguez; A. J. Pierzynski; Jon Paul Morosi; Ken Rosenthal; David Ortiz; Terry Collins
- Country of origin: United States
- Original language: English

Production
- Running time: Live Nightly; 11PM - 12AM ET, 12AM- 1AM ET in case of preemption.
- Production company: Fox Sports

Original release
- Network: Fox Sports 1
- Release: March 31, 2014 – 2020

MLB Whiparound is an American baseball nightly television show on Fox Sports 1 hosted by Chris Myers and Kevin Burkhardt with Joel Klatt alternating as a secondary presenter. The presenter is joined by either 1 or 2 analysts from the group of Mark Sweeney, Eric Karros, Dontrelle Willis, Pete Rose, Nick Swisher, Alex Rodriguez, A. J. Pierzynski, Frank Thomas, and Terry Collins, as well as Fox Sports' Jon Paul Morosi and Ken Rosenthal. Although the daily program ended in 2020, FOX continues to offer a whiparound of other MLB games if available during rain delays.

== Description and format ==
The show features Quick-Turnaround Highlights of In-Progress Games, News, and Analysis. The show is located in Studio A (Adjacent to Fox Sports Live) in Los Angeles. The show airs on Mondays through Fridays at 11 pm ET unless there is live programming in which case it airs at Midnight ET.

== See also ==
- Major League Baseball on Fox
- Baseball Tonight
- MLB Tonight
