= Joel Sherman (sportswriter) =

American sportswriter (born 1964)

- Born: March 17, 1964 (age 62); Brooklyn, New York, U.S.
- Occupations: Sportswriter, author
- Known for: Columnist, author
- Writing career
- Years active: 1989-present

Joel Sherman (born March 17/18, 1964) is a sportswriter for the New York Post. He is also a baseball insider with MLB Network and co-hosts with Jon Heyman the baseball podcast The Show.

== Early life ==
Sherman was born and raised in Canarsie in Brooklyn, New York. He graduated from NYU in 1985.

Sherman worked for both the in-house Washington Square News and the UPI while at NYU.

== Career ==
Sherman joined the New York Post in 1989 as an intern and later served as a beat writer writing about the New York Yankees from 1989 to 1995. Since 1996 he has served as the paper's national baseball columnist. He also writes a column called "Joel Sherman's 3 Things" for the paper.

In 2013, Sherman joined MLB Network as an insider. In this role he frequently appears on shows like MLB Now and MLB Central.

Sherman has been a voter for the National Baseball Hall of Fame since 1998. He appears on MLB Network's annual Hall of Fame election day coverage.

In 2006, he wrote Birth of a Dynasty: Behind the Pinstripes with the 1996 Yankees.

== Personal life ==
Sherman is Jewish. He married Jillian Schwelder in 1992 and they have two children.
