= Alanna Rizzo =

American sports reporter (born 1975)

- Born: August 8, 1975 (age 51)
- Education: University of Colorado at Boulder
- Occupation: Sports reporter

Alanna Janel Rizzo (born August 8, 1975) is an American sports reporter, who was part of the Los Angeles Dodgers broadcast team on Spectrum SportsNet LA from 2013 through 2020. She rejoined MLB Network in 2021. On April 30, 2025, NESN announced the hiring of Rizzo for Red Sox coverage.

== Biography ==
Rizzo is a native of Colorado who is also Cuban-American and fluent in Spanish. She participated in track and cross country at Sierra High School (class of 1993) in Colorado Springs, where she was later inducted into the athletic hall of fame. Though she earned an undergraduate degree in international business, Rizzo's interests shifted away from the business world. She returned to the University of Colorado at Boulder, where she received an M.A. in broadcast journalism in 2003.

After stints as a sports anchor for CBS stations in Wichita Falls, Texas, and Madison, Wisconsin, Rizzo became a reporter for Root Sports Rocky Mountain. She won three Regional Emmy awards. She worked at MLB Network from early 2012 until late 2013. She reported for the shows Intentional Talk and Quick Pitch on MLB Network. Rizzo resigned from her position with the Dodgers in 2021. She has rejoined the MLB Network as a contributor to Chris Russo's High Heat show.

== Personal life ==
Rizzo is the founder of Guidry's Guardian Foundation.

In 2022, Rizzo married former MLB catcher Chris Iannetta.
