= Hazel Mae =

Filipino-Canadian sportscaster

- Mae in November 2026
- Born: Hazel Mae Cagulada; April 7, 1970 (age 56); Tagbilaran, Bohol, Philippines
- Education: York University
- Occupation: Sportscaster
- Years active: 2001–present
- Spouse: Kevin Barker
- Children: 1

Hazel Mae Barker (born April 7, 1970), known professionally as Hazel Mae, is a Filipino-Canadian sportscaster.

She was the former lead anchor for the New England Sports Network's SportsDesk news program and most recently the anchor on MLB Network. Mae worked for Sportsnet until 2004, when she left to work for NESN SportsDesk. Mae returned on November 14, 2011.

Mae grew up in Toronto, graduating from St. John Paul II Catholic Secondary School and began her sports broadcasting career hosting a sports update show on campus at York University.

Mae worked as a Field Level Reporter for TBS MLB Tuesday starting in 2022.

== Broadcast career ==
=== Rogers Sportsnet ===
Hazel Mae anchored the morning edition of Sportsnetnews on Rogers Sportsnet, one of Canada's all-sports networks. In addition to her duties on Sportsnetnews, Mae was the host of JZone, a weekly magazine show dedicated to all things Toronto Blue Jays, also owned by Rogers Sportsnet. Mae began her tenure at the network providing sports updates to its radio affiliates throughout Ontario.

=== NESN ===
Mae subsequently moved to Boston, where she became the lead anchor for NESN's SportsDesk from December 2004 to June 2008. She also hosted The Ultimate Red Sox Show, NESN's Red Sox week-in-review program and The Buzz, the Boston Bruins top-ten in-season show. On June 2, 2008, NESN announced Mae would be leaving the network at the end of the month, and she made her final Sportsdesk broadcast on June 28. During her tenure at NESN, her popularity was reflected by her nomination to be considered for the first president of Red Sox Nation. The position eventually went to the late Jerry Remy.

=== MLB Network ===
In August 2008, it was announced that Mae would become a host/reporter on MLB Network. Since 2009, she has appeared on Hot Stove, MLB Tonight, 30 Clubs in 30 Days, and Quick Pitch for the channel, as well as hosting the re-airing of Mark Buehrle's perfect game. In 2011, she became host of a new program, The Rundown, along with Matt Yaloff.

=== Return to Sportsnet ===
On September 19, 2011, it was announced that Hazel would leave MLB Network and return to Sportsnet. It was announced on-air during the Toronto Maple Leafs game on November 3 that she would be debuting on November 14 as anchor of the 6pm edition of Sportsnet Connected. Mae went on to anchor the show until July 1, 2015, when it was replaced by Tim & Sid. She currently works on Sportsnet broadcasts of Toronto Blue Jays games as their field-level reporter.

In 2026, she was named the recipient of the Gordon Sinclair Award, the Academy of Canadian Cinema and Television's lifetime achievement award for broadcast journalists, at the 14th Canadian Screen Awards.

== Personal life ==
Mae was born to a Filipino father who was a lawyer before he immigrated to Canada in 1973. She is married to former Major League Baseball first baseman Kevin Barker. She currently has one son with him, Chase.
