= Harold Reynolds =

American baseball player and commentator (born 1960)

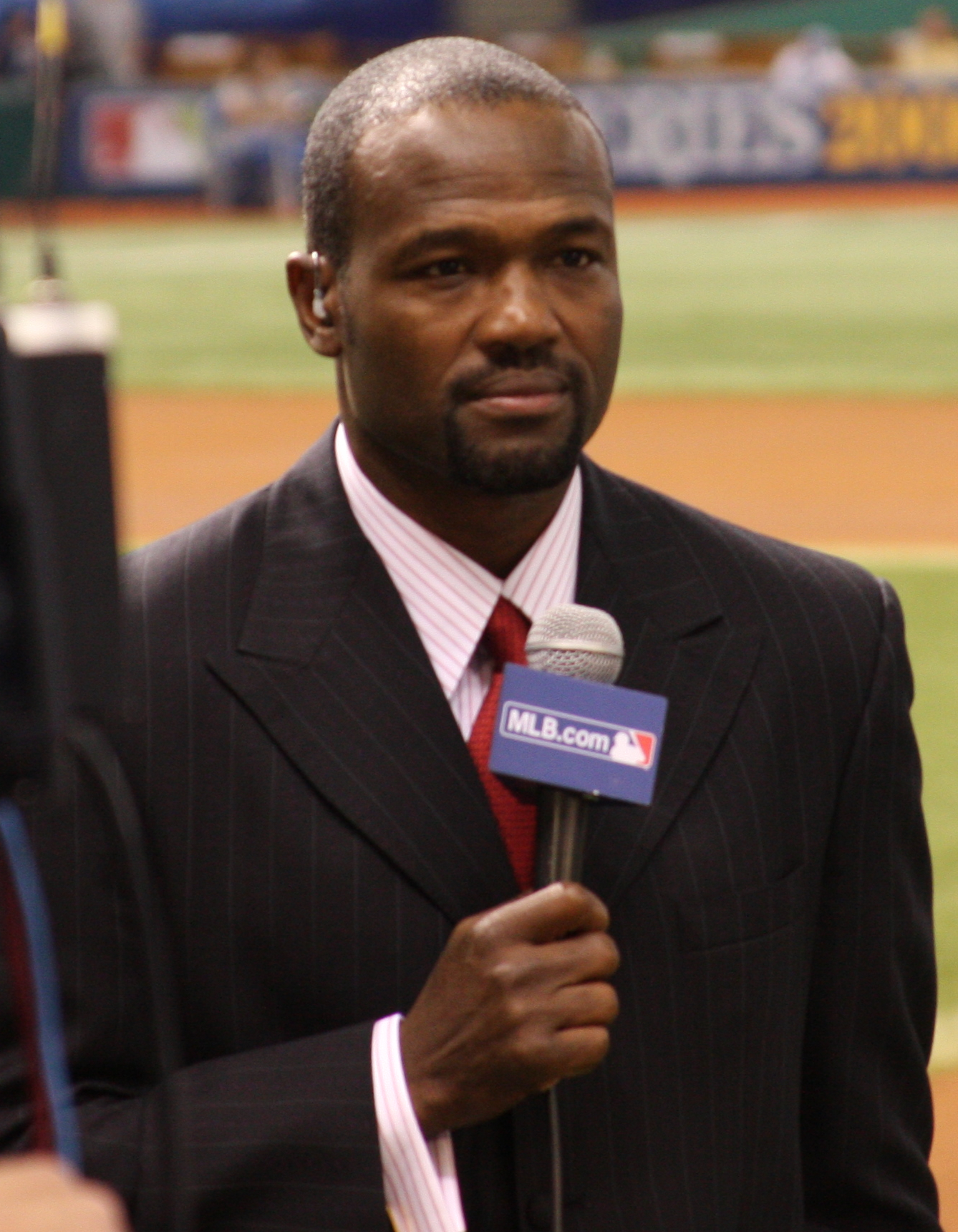
- Reynolds with MLB.com at the 2008 World Series
- Second baseman
- Born: November 26, 1960 (age 65); Eugene, Oregon, U.S.
- Batted: Switch Threw: Right

MLB debut
- September 2, 1983, for the Seattle Mariners

Last MLB appearance
- August 7, 1994, for the California Angels

MLB statistics
- Batting average: .258
- Home runs: 21
- Runs batted in: 353
- Stolen bases: 250
- Stats at Baseball Reference

Teams
- Seattle Mariners (1983–1992); Baltimore Orioles (1993); California Angels (1994)

Career highlights and awards
- 2× All-Star (1987, 1988); 3× Gold Glove Award (1988–1990); Roberto Clemente Award (1991); AL stolen base leader (1987)

Harold Craig Reynolds (born November 26, 1960) is an American former professional baseball player and current television sports commentator. He played in Major League Baseball as a second baseman from 1983 to 1994, most prominently as a member of the Seattle Mariners, where he was a two-time All-Star player and a three-time Gold Glove Award winner. He also played for the Baltimore Orioles and the California Angels. In 1991, Reynolds was named the recipient of the prestigious Roberto Clemente Award. After his playing career, he became a four-time Emmy Award winning television baseball analyst, working for the MLB Network and Fox Sports.

== Early career ==
=== High school ===
Born in Eugene, Oregon, Reynolds was raised in Corvallis and starred in football, basketball, and baseball at Corvallis High School. He was a member of the state championship (AAA) football team in 1978, graduated in 1979, and was inducted into the Oregon Sports Hall of Fame in 1998. He was a member of Corvallis' American Legion baseball team that won state and regional titles in August 1978.

=== College ===
Reynolds was selected in the sixth round (144th overall) of the 1979 MLB draft by the San Diego Padres on June 5. He opted not to sign and attended college initially at San Diego State University before transferring to Cañada College in Redwood City, California. In the 1980 MLB draft on June 3, Reynolds was selected with the second pick of the amateur draft's secondary phase by the Seattle Mariners.

On June 1, 2013, Reynolds was inducted into the Cañada College Hall of Fame and was presented with the "Colts Lifetime Achievement Award".

== Professional career ==
Reynolds spent several seasons in the minor leagues, playing for the Wausau Timbers (A) in Wisconsin in 1981, Lynn Sailors (AA) in Massachusetts in 1982, and Salt Lake Gulls (AAA) in Utah in 1983, prior to his major league debut on September 2, 1983. In his major league debut, Reynolds appeared as a pinch runner for Ken Phelps in the ninth inning of a 5–4 loss to the New York Yankees. During his time in the minors, Reynolds learned how to switch hit by working with minor league manager and former Cincinnati Reds catcher Bill Plummer. The following season, he played AAA ball in Salt Lake before being called up again in September 1984. Reynolds exceeded his rookie limits during the 1985 season and batted .144 with 3 RBI in 67 games. The next season, Reynolds appeared in over 100 games for the first time. He finished the season batting .222 with a home run, 24 RBI and 30 stolen bases in 126 games.

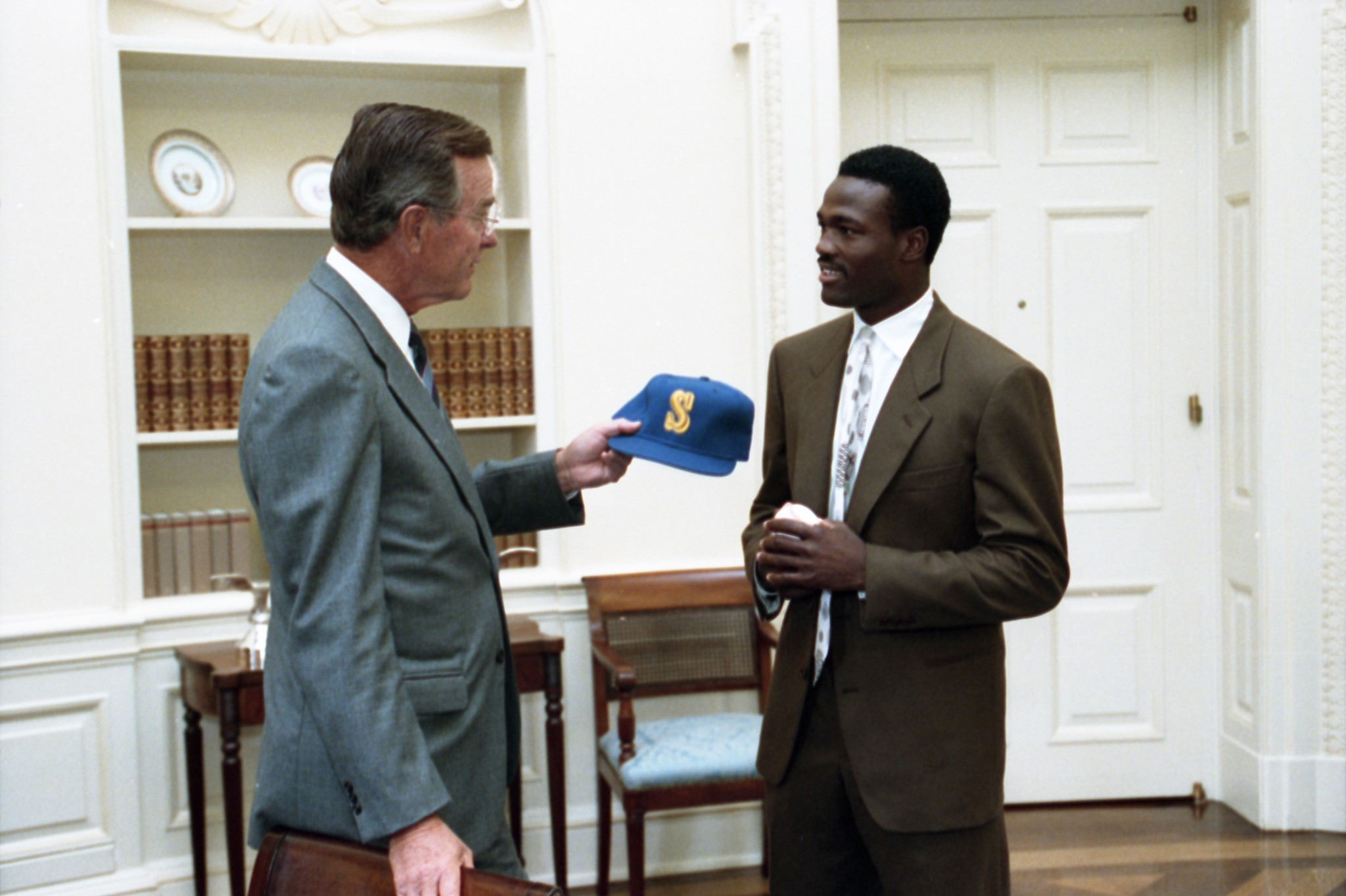
Reynolds (right) presents President George H. W. Bush with a Seattle Mariners baseball cap in the Oval Office in 1990.

Reynolds was an All-Star in 1987 and 1988, led the American League in stolen bases with 60 in 1987, in triples with 11 in 1988, and in at-bats with 642 in 1990. He was the only player other than Rickey Henderson to lead the American League in stolen bases during any season in the 1980s. However, Reynolds was also caught stealing 20 times in 1987, which led the AL, and he was caught 29 times in 1988, which led the majors. On defense, Reynolds won three Gold Glove Awards and led the American League in assists and double plays five times each. In 1986, he played in Puerto Rico with the Indios de Mayagüez.

On September 30, 1990, Reynolds was the last man to bat at Comiskey Park. He grounded out against Chicago White Sox pitcher Bobby Thigpen to close out a 2–1 White Sox win.

In 1991, Reynolds won the Roberto Clemente Award, given annually to an MLB player selected for his character and charitable contributions to his community.

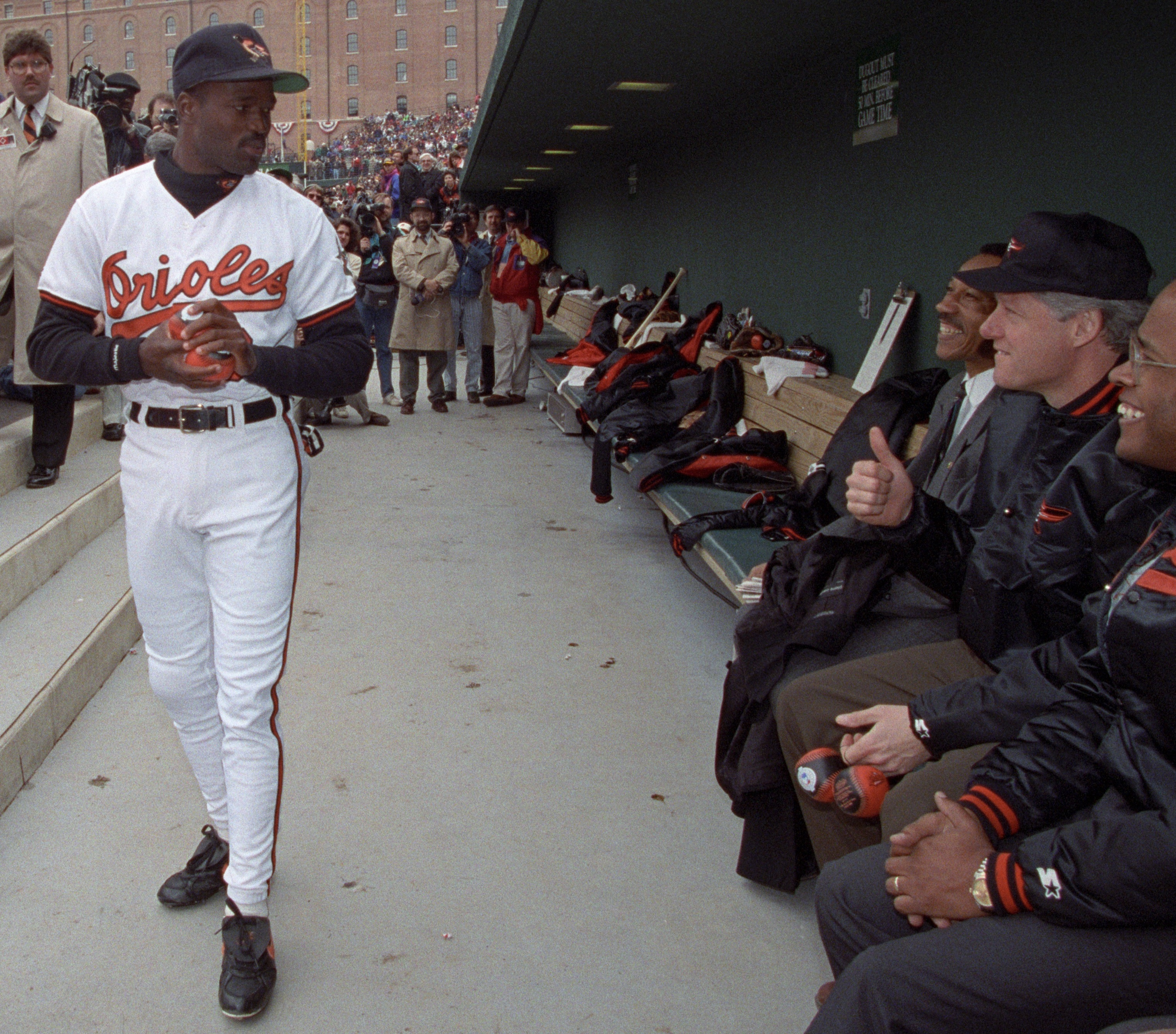
Reynolds (left) receives a thumbs up from President Bill Clinton before Opening Day at Camden Yards in 1993.

On October 26, 1992, Reynolds was granted free agency. He signed a one-year, $1.65 million contract with the Baltimore Orioles on December 11, 1992. He played in 145 games with the Orioles, batting .252 with four home runs and 47 RBI. After one season with the Orioles, he again entered free agency on October 29, 1993. Reynolds signed a minor league contract with the San Diego Padres on January 28, 1994, before being traded to the California Angels on March 29 for Hilly Hathaway. The 1994 season was Reynolds' final season in the major leagues.

Reynolds led the league in double plays turned by a second baseman five times and in errors committed by a second baseman four times, and won three Gold Glove awards for his play at second base.

== Broadcasting ==
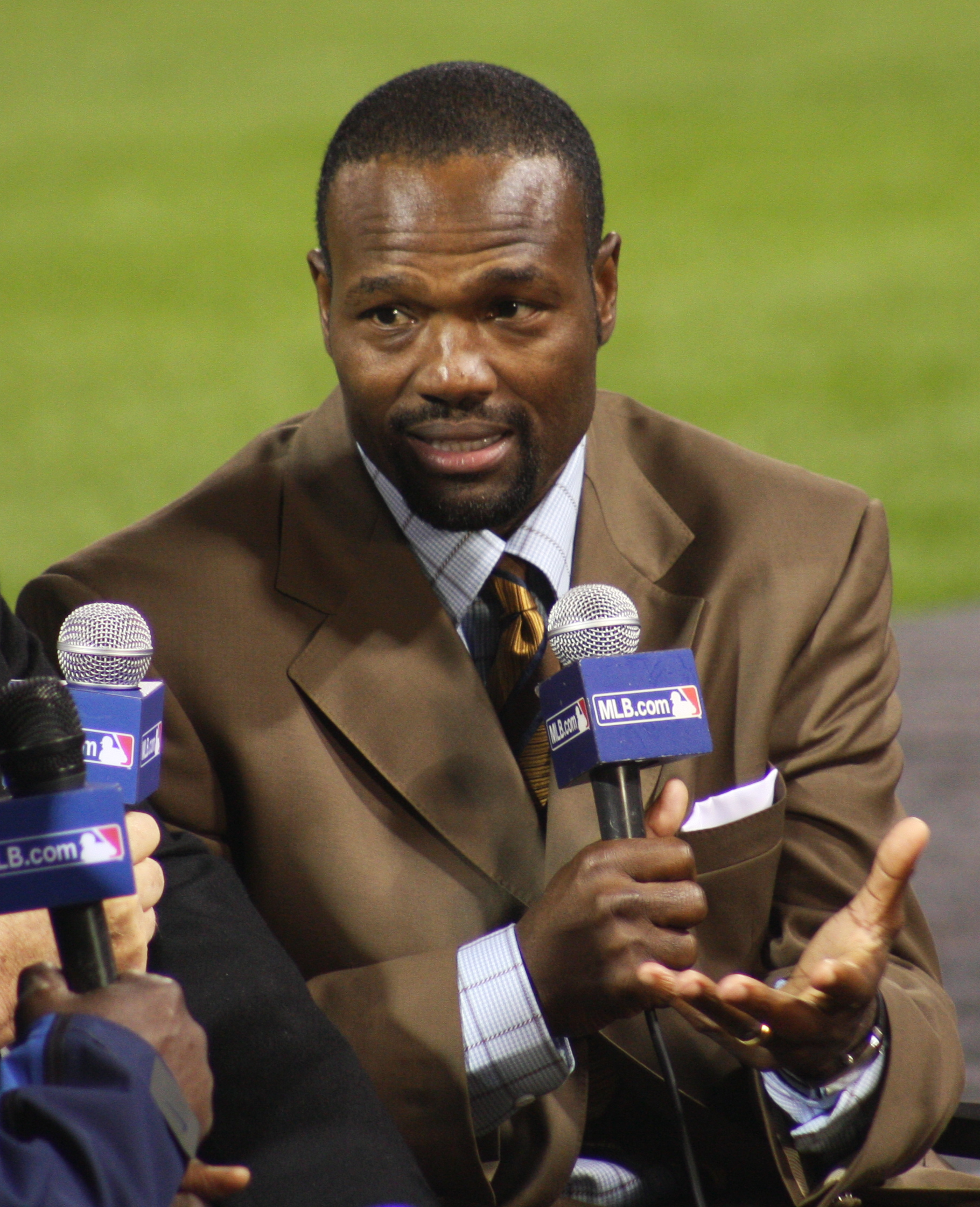
Reynolds at the 2008 World Series

Reynolds joined ESPN in 1996 as a lead studio analyst on Baseball Tonight. He appeared at major baseball events for ESPN, including the All-Star Game and the World Series. He also was a commentator for ESPN's coverage of the College World Series and Little League World Series. However, he was fired from the network in July 2006 following accusations of sexual harassment. Reynolds called the incident "a total misunderstanding," claiming that a hug he had given a woman had been misinterpreted. Reynolds filed a $5 million lawsuit against ESPN for payment of the remainder of his contract. ESPN settled the case with Reynolds in April 2008 and paid him a seven-figure sum.

Reynolds joined MLB.com as a commentator in June 2007. In April 2008, he joined Mets pre-game and post-game coverage on SNY as a baseball commentator. Reynolds also worked with TBS on their Sunday baseball telecasts, as well as the 2008 MLB playoffs.

Reynolds has been an analyst on MLB Network since its launch in January 2009. Reynolds regularly appears on MLB Tonight, Quick Pitch, Diamond Demo and MLB Network's breaking news and special event coverage, including the All-Star Game, Postseason and World Series. He was nominated for a Sports Emmy Award for his work as a studio analyst on MLB Network in 2011, 2012 and 2013.

Reynolds became a member of the MLB on Fox pregame show in 2012, which at the time was being produced out of MLB Network's studios. Reynolds worked on Fox's pregame show for two years alongside Matt Vasgersian and Kevin Millar. After the 2013 season, Reynolds, along with Tom Verducci, was promoted to join Joe Buck on the network's top broadcast team following the retirement of lead analyst Tim McCarver, which lasted for two seasons until the duo was replaced by John Smoltz in 2016.

== Personal life ==
Reynolds is a Christian and is the youngest of eight children. His brother Don Reynolds is a former outfielder who played parts of two seasons with the San Diego Padres.

== See also ==
- List of Major League Baseball annual stolen base leaders
- List of Major League Baseball annual triples leaders
