= Matt Yallof =

American sports commentator (born 1968)

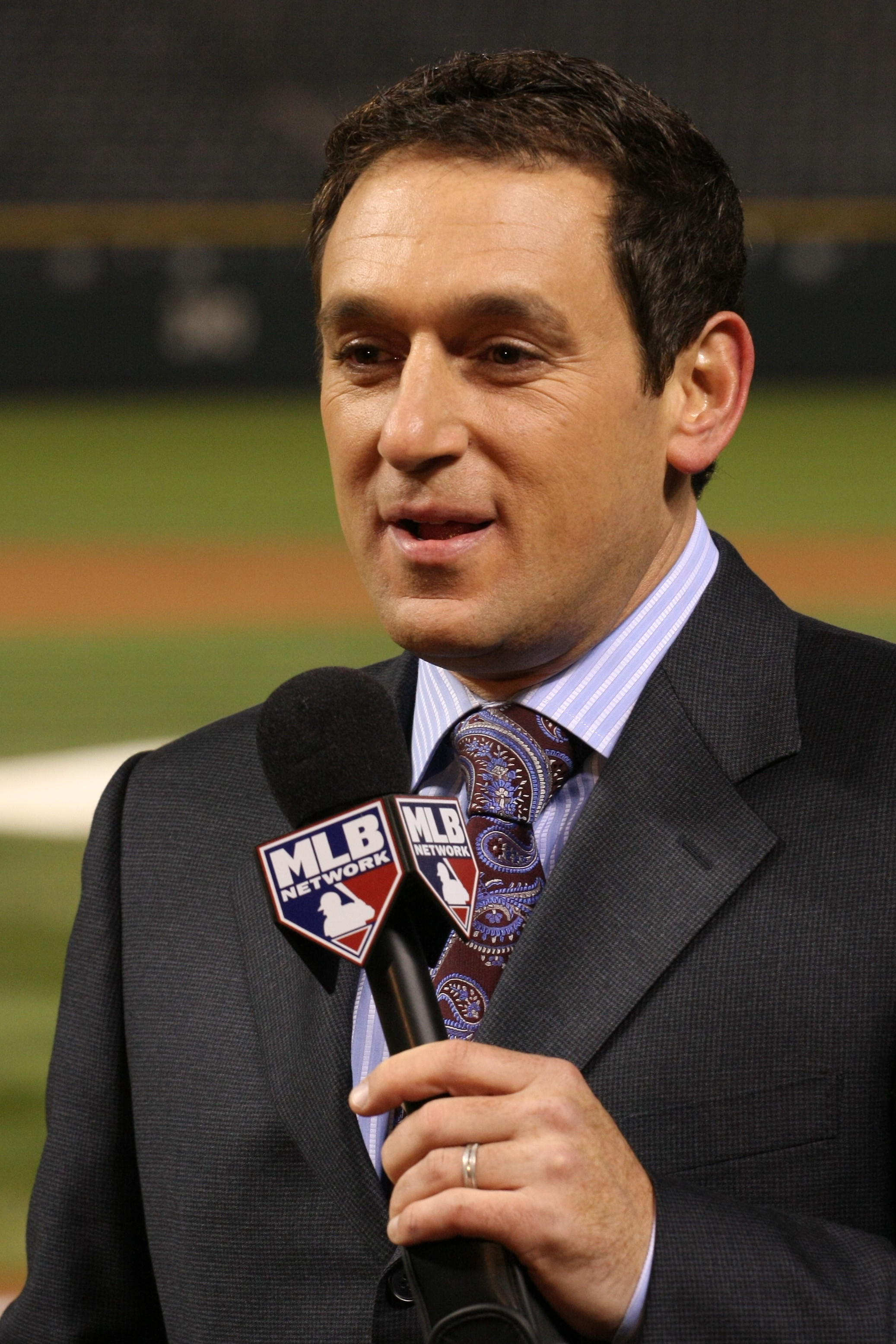
- Yallof reporting from Coors Field in 2009
- Born: Matthew Yallof; September 24, 1968 (age 57); Smithtown, New York, U.S.
- Occupation: Sports commentator
- Sports commentary career
- Team: New York Mets
- Sport: Baseball

Matt Yallof (born September 24, 1968) is an American sports commentator for MLB Network and NHL Network, where he debuted on June 3, 2009. He hosts the regular season studio show The Rundown and MLB Network Strike Zone. He also appears on MLB Tonight and Quick Pitch.

Previously, he was the lead host of the New York Mets pre- and post-game show, as well as a fill-in host for The WheelHouse and Geico SportsNite on SportsNet New York. Before that, he worked at Comcast SportsNet Philadelphia, where he won four regional Emmy awards. He also worked at WKBW-TV in Buffalo, New York, CNN and CNN/SI.

Yallof is a graduate of Muhlenberg College in Allentown, Pennsylvania.

On July 29, 2016, the 47-year-old Yallof suffered an ischemic stroke at his home in Armonk, New York. He spent a week in the ICU followed by a month in a rehab clinic, where he had to undergo physical, occupational and speech therapy. Friends set up a YouCaring page to help him with medical expenses, which was quickly passed around social media, and the page raised $69,192 to help with the medical expenses.

Yallof made his first appearance back on MLB Network in April 2017, hosting MLB Network Strike Zone every Tuesday and Friday, which he plans to do until further notice.
