= Greg Amsinger =

American sportscaster (born 1979)

- Born: May 24, 1979 (age 47); St. Louis, Missouri, U.S.
- Education: Lindenwood University (B.A.)
- Occupation: Sportscaster
- Years active: 2001–present
- Employer: MLB Network

Greg Amsinger (born May 24, 1979) is an American sportscaster and currently a studio host for MLB Network.

== Personal life ==
Amsinger was born on May 24, 1979, in St. Louis, Missouri. He has five brothers and one sister. Amsinger and his wife have two children and they currently reside in Montclair, New Jersey, just outside New York City.

== Career ==
Before arriving at MLB Network in 2009, Amsinger had worked at CBS College Sports/CSTV and at WTHI-TV in Terre Haute, Indiana. A 2001 graduate of Lindenwood University, Amsinger worked at numerous part-time radio jobs while in school including two years as producer of the St. Louis Cardinals Baseball Radio Network at KMOX. Other side jobs included play-by-play broadcaster at KSLQ radio and the inaugural voice of the now defunct River City Renegades indoor professional football organization.

=== CBS College Sports (CSTV) ===
Before signing with MLB, Amsinger was the first and primary studio host for CBS College Sports Network (formerly CSTV). He hosted numerous shows including Crystal Ball, Inside College Football, The #1 College Sports Show, Generation Next and NCAA March Madness Highlights (the official highlight show of the NCAA men's basketball tournament). He has done play-by-play for women's college basketball and paintball.

In 2006, he hosted the SEC Preview Show with Gary Danielson and Brian Jones. In 2007, Amsinger co-hosted the World Series of Video Games with the former MTV host Susie Castillo. In 2008, Amsinger also hosted the Tour de France for CBS.

=== MLB Network ===
Amsinger is a studio host appearing across MLB Network's programming, including MLB Tonight, MLB Network's Emmy Award-winning flagship studio show. Amsinger also hosts MLB Network's exclusive telecast of the MLB Draft as well as its special event coverage of the All-Star Game and World Series. Amsinger enthusiastically and brashly predicted a 10-2 blowout by the Brewers during the MLB pre-game coverage of WS game 3 on Monday, October 26th 2026. The Brewers went on to win that game 10-1 over the Rays.

=== Big Ten Network ===
During the MLB offseason, Amsinger does play-by-play for select men's college basketball games on the Big Ten Network.

=== MLB on TBS ===
Starting on July 23, 2024, Amsinger filled in for Ernie Johnson Jr. on Tuesdays for MLB on TBS in studio. The reasoning is for Johnson taking care of a family member during the rest of the 2024 MLB season.
