= Jon Heyman =

American sports journalist (born 1961)

- Born: February 7, 1961 (age 65); Santa Fe, New Mexico, U.S.
- Education: Northwestern University (B.A.)
- Occupation: Sportswriter

Jon Heyman (born February 7, 1961) is an American baseball columnist for the New York Post, a baseball insider for MLB Network and WFAN Radio and co-host with Joel Sherman of the baseball podcast The Show.

Heyman has also appeared as a guest on numerous radio and TV programs, including Mike and the Mad Dog, The Michael Kay Show, Quite Frankly with Stephen A. Smith, Mike'd Up and Jim Rome is Burning.

== Early years ==
Heyman was born in Santa Fe, New Mexico and grew up in Cedarhurst, New York. He is Jewish and had his bar mitzvah at Temple Sinai in Lawrence, New York in 1974. Heyman graduated from Lawrence High School in 1979 and Northwestern University's Medill School of Journalism in 1983.

== Professional career ==
Heyman began his professional career as a sports writer with The Daily Dispatch in Moline, Illinois.

Heyman spent 16 years at Newsday, where he served as the New York Yankees beat writer, baseball columnist and general sports columnist. From 1999 to 2000, Heyman was a baseball columnist for The Sporting News.

Heyman joined Sports Illustrated in July 2006. At SI, Heyman generally reported on baseball news year-round and wrote a baseball notes column called The Daily Scoop for SI.com. The Daily Scoop ran most weekdays during the baseball season and twice a week during the offseason.

In 2009, Heyman joined the newly launched MLB Network as a baseball insider. In the Sports Illustrated magazine, Heyman frequently wrote an "Inside Baseball" column. In December 2011, Heyman left Sports Illustrated to cover baseball for CBS Sports following the 2011 MLB Winter Meetings. In 2016, Heyman left CBS Sports and joined the FanRag Sports Network as an MLB insider and senior writer for Today's Knuckleball.

In April 2022, Heyman joined the New York Post as a baseball columnist. He and fellow New York Post baseball columnist Joel Sherman soon after launched a podcast entitled The Show.

In December 2022, Heyman tweeted "Arson (sic) Judge appears headed to the Giants." Minutes later, Heyman deleted the tweet and issued a follow-up tweet reading: "Giants say they have not heard on Aaron Judge, [my] apologies for jumping the gun."

In a New York Post article published December 2023 addressing the conclusion of Shohei Ohtani free agency, Heyman made numerous controversial statements regarding the possibility of Ohtani signing in Toronto, including "...this is much better for Major League Baseball." "Toronto is a beautiful city, too, but for non-hockey sports, there’s a small-time feel to the place." "The Jays may have been a better opportunity for marketing dollars because they represent an entire country — certainly for the team and maybe for him — but he has to live, too." "LA is where Ohtani belongs. Just glad he knew that, too."

In December 2024, Heyman was involved in a verbal altercation with WFAN host Keith McPherson. After McPherson brought up Heyman's now-infamous “Arson Judge” tweet and his relationship with agent Scott Boras, Heyman accused McPherson of “questioning [his] integrity” and pledged that he was “done with WFAN” before abruptly ending the interview.
