= Joe Simpson (baseball) =

American baseball player and broadcaster (born 1951)

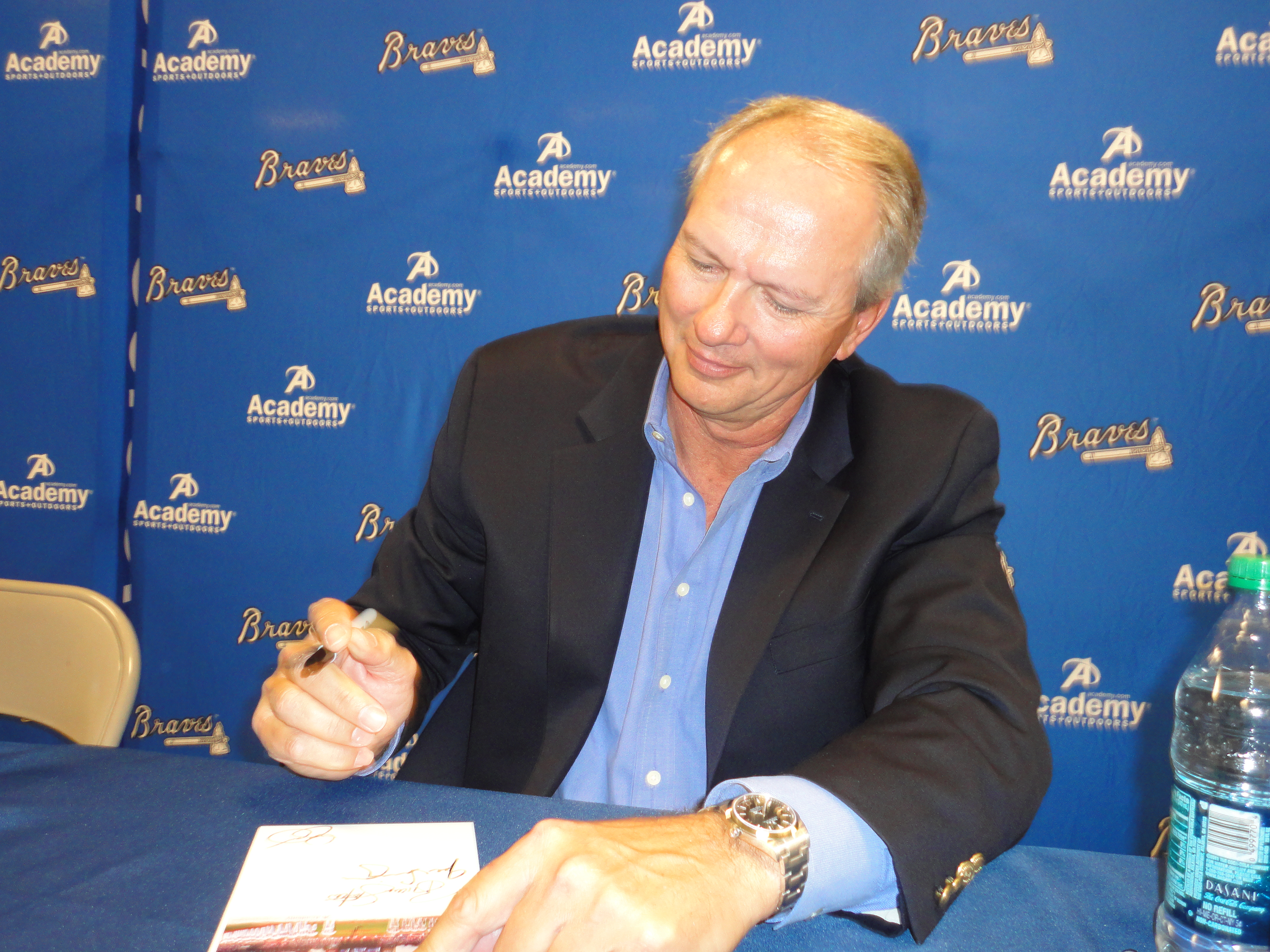
- Simpson signing autographs in 2012
- Outfielder
- Born: December 31, 1951 (age 74); Purcell, Oklahoma, U.S.
- Batted: Left Threw: Left

MLB debut
- September 2, 1975, for the Los Angeles Dodgers

Last MLB appearance
- October 1, 1983, for the Kansas City Royals

MLB statistics
- Batting average: .242
- Home runs: 9
- Runs batted in: 124
- Stats at Baseball Reference

Teams
- Los Angeles Dodgers (1975–1978); Seattle Mariners (1979–1982); Kansas City Royals (1983)

Career highlights and awards
- Braves Hall of Fame

Joe Allen Simpson (born December 31, 1951) is an American former professional baseball player, and has been a radio and television broadcaster for the Atlanta Braves of Major League Baseball (MLB) since 1992.

== Playing career ==
Simpson was a college baseball All-American outfielder/first baseman for the Oklahoma Sooners.

Simpson then played professionally for 12 seasons, beginning in 1973, when he was drafted by the Los Angeles Dodgers in the third round. While with the Dodgers in October 1978, he became the 3,000th strikeout victim of Gaylord Perry. He joined the Seattle Mariners in 1979 before being selected in the Rule 5 draft by the Kansas City Royals, ending his MLB tenure in 1983. He retired after playing in Triple-A in the California Angels organization in 1984.

== Broadcasting career ==
Simpson worked as an analyst on Seattle Mariners telecasts for five years before joining Turner Sports and the Atlanta Braves Radio Network in 1992. He called Braves games on TBS and Turner South until broadcasts ended on those networks.

Simpson was named "Georgia Sports Broadcaster of the Year" in 1995.

Simpson was paired with Brian Jordan, Ron Gant and Tom Glavine during broadcasts on Peachtree TV. He was paired with Skip Caray until Caray's death in the summer of 2008.

Simpson served as an analyst for Major League Baseball on TBS coverage of the 2007 National League Division Series with play-by-play commentator Don Orsillo during the series between the Colorado Rockies and the Philadelphia Phillies. The team called the one-game playoff between the Colorado Rockies and the San Diego Padres. He has served as the color analyst for the coverage of the 2009 National League Division Series between the Philadelphia Phillies and the Colorado Rockies with play-by-play commentator Brian Anderson.

In January 2018, Simpson was inducted into the Braves Hall of Fame.

Simpson called Braves games on Fox Sports South and Fox Sports Southeast with play-by-play announcer Chip Caray through the 2018 season. Beginning in 2019, Simpson became the regular color commentator for the Atlanta Braves Radio Network alongside play-by-play announcer Jim Powell. As of 2021, Simpson is usually paired with Ben Ingram.

== Personal life ==
Simpson and his wife live in Marietta, Georgia. They have two children and one grandchild.
