= NBA (video game series) =

- Genre: Sports
- Developer: San Diego Studio
- Publisher: Sony Computer Entertainment
- Platforms: PlayStation Portable, PlayStation 2, PlayStation 3
- First release: NBA; March 2005
- Latest release: NBA 10: The Inside; October 2009

NBA is a series of basketball video games developed by San Diego Studio and published by Sony Computer Entertainment for PlayStation 2, PlayStation 3 or PlayStation Portable between 2005 and 2009. It is the successor to the NBA ShootOut series. The games are licensed by the National Basketball Association.

The games released in the series are NBA, NBA 06, NBA 07, NBA 08, NBA 09: The Inside, and NBA 10: The Inside.

== Games ==
Game	Cover star	
Game	Player	Team
NBA	Ray Allen	Seattle SuperSonics
NBA 06	Amar'e Stoudemire	Phoenix Suns
NBA 07	Kobe Bryant	Los Angeles Lakers
NBA 08	Amar'e Stoudemire	Phoenix Suns
NBA 09: The Inside	Carlos Boozer	Utah Jazz
NBA 09: The Inside	Carmelo Anthony	Denver Nuggets
NBA 09: The Inside	LeBron James	Cleveland Cavaliers
NBA 09: The Inside	Kobe Bryant	Los Angeles Lakers
NBA 09: The Inside	Dwyane Wade	Miami Heat
NBA 09: The Inside	Paul Pierce	Boston Celtics
NBA 10: The Inside	Brandon Roy	Portland Trail Blazers

=== NBA (2005) ===
NBA is a basketball video game that was released in March 2005 for the PlayStation Portable.

=== NBA 06 ===
NBA 06: Featuring the Life Vol. 1 was released on October 4, 2005 for the PlayStation Portable and November 1, 2005 for PlayStation 2. It features Phoenix Suns power forward/center Amar'e Stoudemire on the cover. Players may also compete in a new feature, the PlayStation's Skills challenge.

Amar'e Stoudemire and P.J. Carlesimo appeared in commercials featuring three fictitious NBA players.

=== NBA 07 ===
NBA 07: Featuring the Life Vol. 2 was released in 2006. It features Los Angeles Lakers shooting guard Kobe Bryant on the cover, with his newly chosen jersey number of 24. It is the second installment of the NBA: Featuring the Life series and is a launch game for the PlayStation 3.

=== NBA 08 ===
NBA 08 was developed by San Diego Studio and published by Sony Computer Entertainment in 2007. For the second time in the series, Phoenix Suns player Amar'e Stoudemire is featured on the cover, having previously appeared on the cover of NBA 06. Unlike most NBA games, this one had a story.

=== NBA 09: The Inside ===
NBA 09: The Inside was developed by San Diego Studio and published by Sony Computer Entertainment on October 7, 2008. It does not feature a single cover athlete, but instead features a group of six NBA players that include Carmelo Anthony, Carlos Boozer, Kobe Bryant, LeBron James, Paul Pierce, and Dwyane Wade.

=== NBA 10: The Inside ===
NBA 10: The Inside
- Developer: San Diego Studio
- Publisher: Sony Computer Entertainment
- Platform: PlayStation Portable
- Release: NA: October 6, 2009
- Genres: Sports, simulation, arcade
- Modes: Single-player, multiplayer

NBA 10: The Inside is a basketball simulation video game developed by San Diego Studio and published by Sony Computer Entertainment for PlayStation Portable on October 6, 2009. It reuses the NBA on TNT graphics, albeit with the TNT logo with the NBA Jumpman logo.

The game received "average" reviews according to Metacritic.

NBA 10: The Inside

Aggregate score
Aggregator	Score
Metacritic	69/100

Review scores
Publication	Score
1Up.com	B−
GameRevolution	C+
GameZone	7/10
IGN	7/10
