= NBA on TNT =

NBA basketball cable telecasts (1989–2025)

- Final logo, used from the 2017–18 NBA season onward (Note: This logo combines the 2017 NBA wordmark and the 2016 TNT logo, the latter of which was unveiled in the middle of the 2015–16 NBA season.)
- Also known as: TNT NBA Thursday (for Thursday night telecasts)
- Genre: American basketball game telecasts
- Presented by: Ernie Johnson; Shaquille O'Neal; Kenny Smith; Charles Barkley; Draymond Green; Kevin Harlan; Reggie Miller; Allie LaForce; Brian Anderson; Stan Van Gundy; Jared Greenberg; Ian Eagle; Grant Hill; Spero Dedes; Greg Anthony; Stephanie Ready; Adam Lefkoe; Candace Parker; Vince Carter
- Country of origin: United States

Production
- Production locations: Various NBA arenas (game telecasts)
- Camera setup: Multi-camera
- Running time: 210 minutes or until game ends (inc. adverts)
- Production company: TNT Sports

Original release
- Network: TNT (1989–2025); TBS (2015–2025; simulcasts, alternate broadcasts and overflow); TruTV (2024–2025; simulcasts and alternate broadcasts); NBA TV (2008–2025; overflow); Max (2023–2025)
- Release: November 4, 1989 – May 31, 2025

Related
- Inside the NBA; NBA on TBS; NBA on CBS

The NBA on TNT is an American presentation of National Basketball Association (NBA) games, produced by TNT Sports (formerly known as Turner Sports). In the United States, the TNT cable network held the rights to broadcast NBA games from 1989 to 2025, making it TNT's longest-running regular program and sporting event, dating back to only a year after TNT's launch on October 3, 1988. Its telecasts were also streamed on its Max platform from 2023 to 2025. TNT's NBA coverage included the Inside the NBA studio show, weekly doubleheaders throughout the regular season on Tuesdays and Thursdays, a majority of games during the first two rounds of the playoffs, and one conference finals series. It also simulcasted select games with TruTV.

In July 2024, the NBA signed new 11-year media deals with ESPN/ABC, NBC/Peacock, and Amazon Prime Video. In response, TNT filed a lawsuit against the league, arguing that their yearly billion-dollar offer matched the deal made by Amazon. The case was settled in November 2024, allowing TNT's parent company to remain involved in the NBA by licensing Inside the NBA to ESPN. TNT also announced that it would continue to operate NBA TV and NBA.com but it later withdrew in June 2025. TNT's contract with the NBA ended with the conclusion of the 2024–25 season and 2025 playoffs. The final game was Game 6 of the 2025 Eastern Conference finals between the Indiana Pacers and New York Knicks on May 31, 2025.

== Coverage ==
=== Overview ===
TNT aired many of the NBA's marquee games, including the NBA All-Star Game, Opening Night games, and games on Martin Luther King Day. During the playoffs, TNT split its games with ESPN and aired a full conference finals series. During the regular season, TNT aired games on Tuesday nights and Thursday nights. To avoid competition with the NFL's Thursday Night Football, regular season games during the first half of the season aired exclusively on Tuesday nights.

The NBA on TNT logo used from 1994 to 2001

In the summer of 1987, the Turner Broadcasting System signed a new joint broadcast contract between TBS and TNT effective with the 1989-90 NBA season. Beginning that season, TBS and TNT split broadcast rights to televise NBA games. TNT held rights to broadcast the NBA Draft and most NBA regular season and playoff games, while TBS only aired single games or double-headers once a week.

NBA on TNT logo 2005–2008

The 2001–2002 season would ultimately mark TBS's final year of NBA coverage. Turner Sports signed a new NBA television contract in which TNT would assume rights to Turner's NBA package, while TBS would discontinue game coverage altogether. TNT also broadcast games on Wednesday and Thursday nights; ESPN assumed TBS's half of the league's cable television rights. As part of the deal, TNT acquired the rights to the NBA All-Star game, which was moved to a cable television network for the first time.

Variation of previous NBA on TNT logo with glossy finish, 2008 until 2015

In 2008, TNT broadcast the NBA Christmas Games for the first time as Marv Albert and Mike Fratello called the game between the Washington Wizards and the Cleveland Cavaliers in Quicken Loans Arena, while Kevin Harlan and Reggie Miller called the game between the Dallas Mavericks and the Portland Trail Blazers in Rose Garden. TNT aired on Christmas Day again in 2011, when it televised the game between the Boston Celtics and the New York Knicks at Madison Square Garden, the very first game of the 2011–12 season, as a result of a lockout. Albert (himself a former Knicks broadcaster) and Steve Kerr called the game. TNT normally aired NBA Christmas Day games only if it fell on a Thursday (except during the 2011–12 season). However, TNT announced that they would air a Christmas Day game on December 25, 2017 (a Monday) featuring the Minnesota Timberwolves and the Los Angeles Lakers. It also marked the first time that the Inside the NBA crew of Ernie Johnson, Kenny Smith, Charles Barkley, and Shaquille O'Neal called an NBA regular-season game together.

On May 11, 2011, Turner Sports (this includes TBS) broadcast its 1,000th playoff telecast.

For the 2015–16 season, the NBA and Turner Sports partnered with NextVR to stream the Warriors vs. Pelicans, the first-ever game to be broadcast live in virtual reality.

The previous NBA on TNT logo, before TNT's network logo change, used until 2016

For the 2016–17 season, TNT announced that it would air a new series of Monday-night doubleheaders during the latter half of the season, beginning on January 16, 2017. Monday night games from February 27 to March 27 were branded as Players Only broadcasts, featuring only former NBA players and without a traditional play-by-play announcer. Additionally, TNT announced that it would hold a "Road Show" tour in various cities throughout the season, which would feature fan experiences and festivities, and a live broadcast of Inside the NBA on-location. The tour began in Cleveland outside the Quicken Loans Arena, host of TNT's opening night game featuring the Cleveland Cavaliers.

Longtime lead play-by-play voice Marv Albert announced his retirement at the end of the 2021 NBA playoffs. Albert's final assignment with TNT took place in the 2021 Eastern Conference finals. During the course of the 2021–22 NBA season, TNT anointed Kevin Harlan as its new lead play-by-play voice, assigning him to call the 2022 NBA All-Star Game and the Western Conference finals. Starting with the 2023 NBA All-Star Game, however, Brian Anderson took over play-by-play duties, but Harlan remained the play-by-play voice for TNT's conference finals coverage.

In the 2023–24 season, the NBA introduced its in-season tournament, later known as the NBA Cup, with round-robin playdates on Tuesdays and Fridays during November. TNT broadcast Tuesday games during the tournament, followed by the quarterfinal games on December 4 and 5, and one semifinal game on December 7. In the semifinal games, both ESPN and TNT collaborated on each other's coverage, with Reggie Miller joining ESPN's broadcast, and Doc Rivers (a former commentator with TNT from 1995 to 1999) joining TNT's broadcast. ESPN's Stephen A. Smith and Michael Wilbon also appeared on Inside the NBA. TNT also began simulcasting select NBA games on truTV.

=== Studio coverage ===
Ernie Johnson was TNT's NBA studio host from 1990 to the end of TNT's coverage in 2025. He was joined by Shaquille O'Neal, Kenny Smith, and Charles Barkley. The NBA postgame show which features the four, Inside the NBA, gained widespread popularity for the chemistry and banter they have. Occasionally, Johnson, O'Neal, Smith and Barkley were also joined by Draymond Green.

Normally the studio crew would stay in the TNT Atlanta studios for all of the regular season and the first two rounds of the playoffs. However, in the 2010–11 season the studio crew started taking their pre-game, halftime and Inside the NBA shows on the road in the regular season, specifically select games involving the Miami Heat on TNT, due to the heightened media coverage surrounding the Heat's acquisitions of LeBron James and Chris Bosh. The substitute studio hosts would also be on hand for Inside the NBA and the other game's pre-game and halftime presentations; the "backup" crew at the time consisted of Matt Winer, Chris Webber and Kevin McHale.

For the 2019–20 season, TNT announced plans to reformat its Tuesday games. The pre-game and halftime shows would have a larger focus on social media interaction, "culture", and "style", while Dwyane Wade, Candace Parker, Shaquille O'Neal, and Bleacher Report's Adam Lefkoe would serve as panelists. The new studio panel was originally intended to premiere with a doubleheader on January 28, 2020. However, due to the death of Kobe Bryant the previous Sunday (which led to the postponement of a Clippers/Lakers game scheduled to be televised as part of the doubleheader), the premiere was delayed to February 4, and the remaining game was instead preceded by a special edition of Inside the NBA from Staples Center, covering the aftermath of Bryant's death. While the Tuesday postgame shows still carried the Inside the NBA brand during the first half of the season (the program airs on Thursday nights during the second half of the season), the Tuesday postgame shows were simply branded as the NBA on TNT Postgame Show for the second half of the season. Jamal Crawford replaced Wade in 2023.

=== Playoff coverage ===
TNT's playoff coverage was nicknamed 40 Games in 40 Nights. During the first round, TNT aired games from Sunday to Thursday nights, with occasional broadcasts on Saturdays. In the second round, TNT aired playoff games from Sunday to Wednesday nights.

In previous years, TNT and TBS aired doubleheaders opposite each other on each night of the first round of the playoffs, with one network airing a doubleheader at 7:00 p.m. and 9:30 p.m. and the other network airing a doubleheader at 8:00 p.m. and 10:30 p.m. (all times Eastern). Starting in 2000, the NBA spread out playoff series so that only two series would play per day (so as to avoid TNT and TBS competing for ratings). TNT would air doubleheaders on most weekdays, while TBS would air one doubleheader per week (in 2002, TBS aired doubleheaders every Tuesday night of the playoffs until the conference finals).

With the advent of a new NBA television deal in 2003 (which ended TBS's coverage), TNT aired playoff games alone, including (in 2003 only) some weekday tripleheaders. The tripleheaders, which were criticized by both fans and many in the media, consisted of one game at 6:00 p.m., another at 8:30 p.m., and a final game at 11:00 p.m. After 2003, the NBA and TNT discontinued the tripleheaders, instead settling for a doubleheader on TNT and a single game on NBA TV simultaneously. However, when Turner Sports acquired NBA TV in 2008, the network abandoned airing the lone non-national Thursday game, instead leaving it up to the local sports networks. However, TBS still aired the start of the second game on occasion in case the ongoing first game on TNT extended beyond the tip-off time of the second game.

TNT also carried exclusive coverage of one NBA conference finals series. From 2003 to 2025, TNT aired a conference final, with the network airing the Eastern Conference finals in odd-number years beginning 2005 and the Western Conference finals in 2003 and in all even-number years. ESPN airs the other conference finals, with weekend coverage of the ESPN-covered series and the Finals being broadcast on ABC.

For the first round, TNT's coverage of the playoffs was not exclusive; regional sports networks could still carry a local call and presentation of their team's games. After the first round, only national coverage from TNT or ESPN/ABC was produced.

=== Loss of rights and lawsuit ===
In 2024, it was reported that TNT was facing the possible loss of its NBA rights as part of its next round of broadcast rights, with the NBA having reportedly reached a renewal agreement with ABC/ESPN and entering new contracts with NBC and Amazon Prime Video.

On July 22, 2024, TNT announced plans to invoke a clause in its contract with the NBA giving it rights to match offers for future media rights, specifically targeting the package that was bid for by Amazon (which includes rights to a slate of Thursday-night regular season games that would begin after the NFL season, the NBA Cup, play-in tournament and playoff games, and six conference finals). Two days later, the NBA rejected TNT's offer of $1.8 billion per year, opting to sign agreements with ABC/ESPN, Amazon, and NBC. The NBA claimed that they had rejected TNT's attempt because TNT was unable to fully match the terms of Amazon's contract. TNT released a response shortly after arguing the NBA had "grossly misinterpreted our contractual rights" forcing TNT to take "appropriate action".

On July 26, TNT filed its lawsuit against the league in New York state court, seeking to delay the NBA's new 2025 media deals from taking effect and to rule that TNT's offer matched Amazon's contract. On August 23, the NBA filed a motion to dismiss the lawsuit, on account of Warner Bros. Discovery (WBD) attempting to "save billions of dollars by combining Amazon's lower price with the linear television rights granted to NBC." WBD alleged that the contract contained "poison pill" provisions intended to make it impossible for it to match, including that NBA coverage be carried on a platform with rights to the National Football League (alluding to Thursday Night Football). The NBA asked the court to permanently seal Amazon and NBC's contracts, claiming the public release of each bid's details would cause substantial competitive harm in future media negotiations with other parties and rivals, but the court released redacted versions of the contracts in October.

On November 16, WBD reached a settlement with the NBA: as part of the settlement, ESPN agreed to pick up Inside the NBA to air in conjunction with its own NBA coverage (with TNT continuing to produce the program with its existing personalities), and sub-license a package of Big 12 Conference college basketball and football games to TNT Sports beginning in 2025. In addition, the NBA agreed to a five-season renewal of its contract with TNT Sports to manage NBA Digital (which includes NBA.com and NBA TV), a long-term license to distribute NBA-related content via digital properties such as Bleacher Report and House of Highlights (reciprocally, the NBA will also gain rights to distribute footage from other TNT Sports basketball broadcasts via its properties), and broadcast rights to the league for WBD properties in Nordic Europe and Latin America (outside of Brazil and Mexico). In June 2025, TNT Sports withdrew from the plan to continue operating NBA TV and the league's digital properties, being unable to come to terms with the league on its future involvement with NBA TV.

==== Aftermath ====
Ahead of and during the 2025 NBA playoffs, many of TNT's commentators and analysts were hired by other companies to work on their upcoming NBA coverage. Reggie Miller moved over to NBC Sports to serve as a top game analyst. Vince Carter also joined NBC as a studio analyst. Taylor Rooks, who worked as a sideline reporter during TNT's final season, was hired by Amazon Prime Video as a studio host. Candace Parker and former TNT analyst Dwyane Wade also joined at Amazon as game analysts. Secondary game analyst announcer Grant Hill joined NBC in a fill-in role while he is still working for college hoops on TNT. Ian Eagle and Kevin Harlan moved over to Sports on Amazon Prime Video to serve as their play-by-play announcers. Also moving over from TNT to Sports on Amazon Prime Video is game analyst Stan Van Gundy.

TNT's final NBA game broadcast was Game 6 of the 2025 Eastern Conference Finals, on May 31, 2025, at Gainbridge Fieldhouse in Indianapolis, with the Indiana Pacers defeated the New York Knicks 125–108 to advance to the franchise's first NBA Finals since 2000. After the Pacers trophy ceremony, TNT's top commentary team Kevin Harlan, Reggie Miller, Stan Van Gundy, and Allie LaForce gathered together at press row to thank everyone who contributed to the NBA on TNT throughout its 36-year history, including production personnel, television executives, game announcers, and sideline reporters. Harlan, who was given the final word of the four, mostly narrated through a slideshow showcasing all of TNT's past and present commentary teams, game analysts, and sideline reporters. The final image was a group picture of TNT's entire production crew that worked on the Eastern Conference Finals, at which point, Harlan concluded his message with:

And our crew, our incredible crew that has been with us. Most of these people have been with Turner well over two decades. Our hearts are full of gratitude, not sadness, but gratitude and happiness for what has been. It has been an honor, it has been a privilege, and I hope you've all enjoyed it as much as we have. Now, we hand the baton to the legendary Mike Breen and our friends at ABC. We thank you for 36 incredible years of watching the NBA. Our producer tonight Tom Heitz, our director Jonathan Bywaters, statistician Brian Taylor, associate director Aaron Banks, production assistants Tyler Makins and Calvin Barnes. Inside the NBA continues here from Indiana with Ernie, Charles, Kenny, and Shaq. Congratulations, again, to the Indiana Pacers, and now for a final time. For Allie LaForce, Stan Van Gundy, and Reggie Miller, Kevin Harlan and our TNT crew saying goodnight courtside from Indianapolis.

As Inside the NBA began to finish its last edition on TNT, Shaquille O'Neal, Kenny Smith, Charles Barkley, and Ernie Johnson each took turns recounting their memories and thanking everyone who contributed to the show, while also alluding to the studio show's impending move to ESPN and ABC. At the end, an emotional Johnson was given the final word, signing the broadcast off with the following message:

I'll try to keep this brief. Several years ago, I wrote a book called Unscripted and I asked people to embrace the unscripted, not fear the unscripted. If I had written the script, the NBA and TNT would be together forever. It's not gonna happen. But, while I was disappointed and I was sad, I was not bitter. We know how business works. Gratitude is the operative word for me. Grateful that, you know, since 1989, I've been with this company. No matter what you call the company, it will always be Turner. And, I'm grateful that I worked with you guys. I'm grateful for all the relationships we've built professionally and personally through the years, you just don't realize that. Until you see people here on the road say, "Hey, this is probably gonna be it", and you think back to all the good times you had. So, I'm grateful for that and also grateful that we have members of our crew who are gonna go work at NBC or work at Amazon. And you know why they got those jobs? Because their résumé says NBA on TNT. So, thank you. We have been honored to do this. Look, the four of us, as you've already heard, the four of us are gonna be together. Our production crew is gonna be together. It's gonna be that same bunch. We're still gonna be shooting that show in Atlanta. It's just gonna air somewhere else. And so, the craziness you see, the nonsense and the foolishness, and the top-notch basketball analysis. All that stuff is gonna be on ESPN or ABC next year, not on TNT. For that, we're sad. But I'm proud to say for the last time, thanks for watching us. It's the NBA on TNT.

In 2026, TNT Sports announced an agreement with FIBA for the rights to senior level men's and women's tournaments including the 2026 FIBA Women's Basketball World Cup, 2027 FIBA Basketball World Cup and EuroBasket 2029, along with associated qualifying tournaments.

== Contract history ==
Seasons	Network	Contract total amount/duration
1988–89 to 1989–90	TBS/TNT	$50 million/2 years
1990–91 to 1993–94	TNT	$275 million/4 years
1994–95 to 1997–98	TNT/TBS	$397 million/4 years
1998–99 to 2001–02	TNT/TBS	$840 million/4 years
2002–03 to 2007–08	TNT	$2.2 billion/6 years
2008–09 to 2015–16	TNT	$7.44 billion/8 years
2016–17 to 2024–25	TNT	$10.8 billion/9 years

== Commentators ==
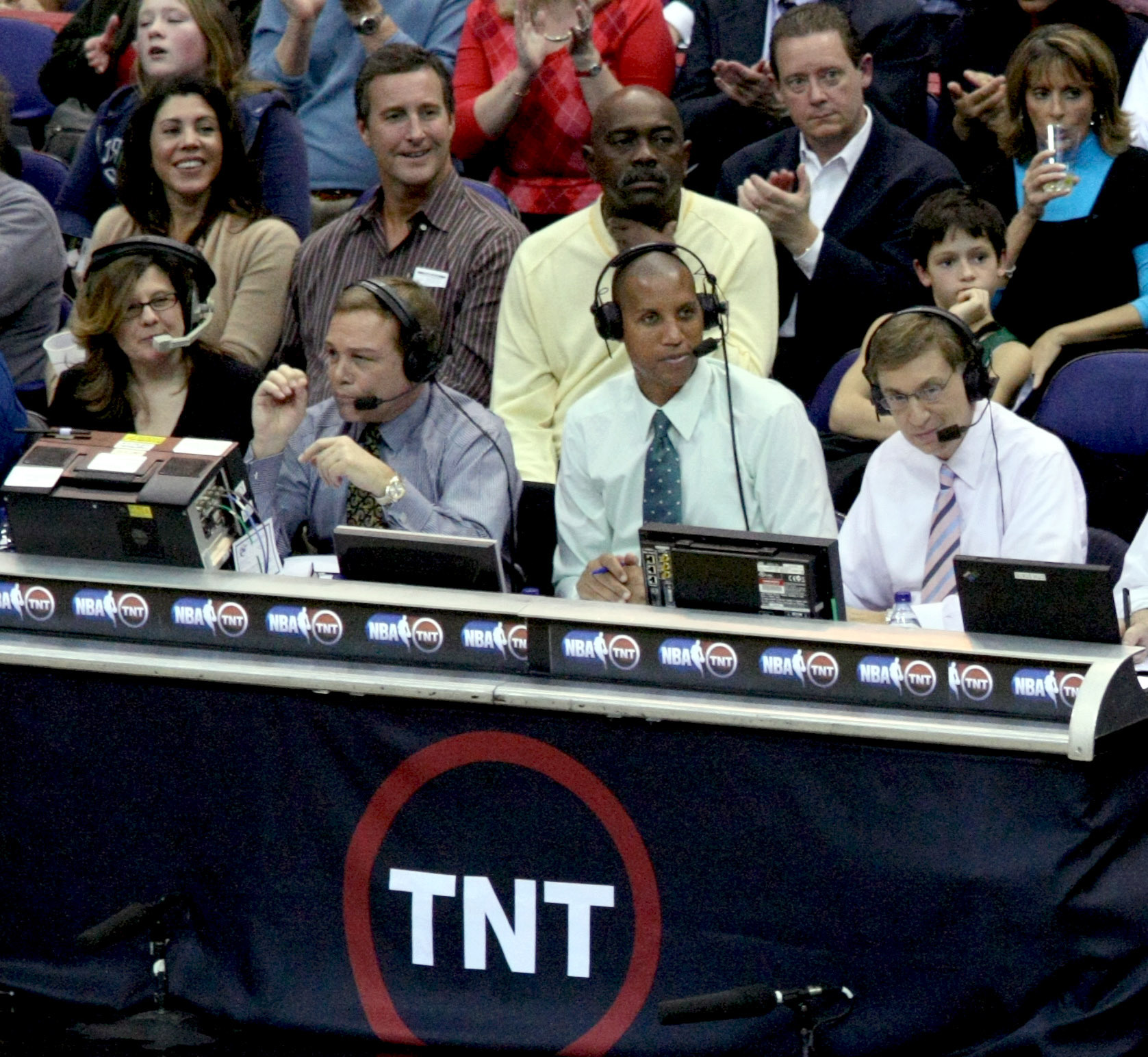
Mike Fratello, Reggie Miller and Marv Albert, along with TNT production staff, during an NBA on TNT broadcast

The final NBA on TNT commentating roster included Kevin Harlan, Brian Anderson, Ian Eagle, and Spero Dedes for play-by-play. Harlan and Anderson normally called Thursday games, while the latter also usually worked Tuesday games with Eagle. Dedes filled in occasionally for both Tuesday and Thursday games, but mainly called games for TNT during the NBA playoffs. Fox Sports' Gus Johnson joined the rotation for the NBA playoffs.

Reggie Miller and Stan Van Gundy were the top color commentators for most games. Other analysts like Jim Jackson, Grant Hill, Candace Parker, and Greg Anthony contributed for select games.

The sideline reporter role was rotated between Allie LaForce, Jared Greenberg, Lauren Jbara, Stephanie Ready and Taylor Rooks. Dennis Scott joined the rotation for the NBA playoffs.

Ernie Johnson controlled the main studio hosting duties on Thursdays, with Bleacher Report's Adam Lefkoe serving that role on Tuesdays. Occasionally, whenever Johnson was away for other assignments, most notably March Madness, or personal reasons, Lefkoe filled in for Johnson. Studio coverage was usually contributed by Shaquille O'Neal, Kenny Smith, and Charles Barkley on Thursdays, with O'Neal, Candace Parker, and Vince Carter contributing on Tuesdays. Parker and Carter, along with Hill among other analysts contributed to the studio show at times.

Prior to his death on December 15, 2016, Craig Sager served a variety of roles on TNT, most prominently as a sideline reporter. Sager was usually paired with Cheryl Miller on most doubleheaders from 1997 to 2013.

Before he was hired as head coach of the Golden State Warriors in 2014, Steve Kerr was the primary game analyst on TNT. Kerr served that role from 2003 to 2006, and again from 2010 to 2014; in between he served as general manager of the Phoenix Suns.

Prior to leaving TNT before the 2021 NBA playoffs, Hall of Fame forward Chris Webber had been tapped as a co-lead analyst, and fill-in studio analyst from 2008 to 2021. Webber and TNT had parted ways without any contract renewal negotiations.

Miami Heat legend Dwyane Wade was part of the Tuesday studio team for three seasons beginning in 2019 but left to pursue other business ventures. Crawford replaced Wade during the 2022–23 season.

Doug Collins was the secondary analyst on TNT; he was also the lead analyst in his first stint with the network from 1989 to 1995, pairing with the likes of Bob Neal, Ron Thulin and Pete Van Wieren. In his second stint from 2003 to 2010, he was usually paired with Harlan during the regular season but was also paired with Albert during the NBA All-Star Game and the conference finals.

The original voice of the NBA on TNT was Bob Neal, who worked with the network from 1989 to 1995; he was also the original voice of the NBA on TBS. Other announcers who worked for TNT include Rick Barry, Hubie Brown, Dick Stockton, Verne Lundquist, Chuck Daly, Danny Ainge, Reggie Theus, Rex Chapman, John Thompson, Jeff Van Gundy, P. J. Carlesimo, Gary Bender, Matt Devlin, Joel Meyers and Kevin Calabro.

Several prominent NBA analysts chose TNT over ABC or ESPN, such as Doug Collins and Charles Barkley (Barkley was not only approached by ABC about an NBA studio job in 2002 but as also rumored to have been approached for a job on Monday Night Football). Reggie Miller was also sought out by ABC and ESPN, only to go to TNT.

The biggest acquisition TNT made, once sought out by ABC and ESPN, was Marv Albert. After the 2002 NBA Finals, Albert, along with Bob Costas, essentially a free agent, was a candidate for the lead spot on The NBA on ABC (which ultimately went to Brad Nessler). As Costas elected to remain with NBC, Albert, hired by TNT in 1999, decided to stay with the network. Some attributed this to TNT having given Albert his first chance to be on national television after the sex scandal that led to his firing at NBC. Albert and Mike Fratello—both of whom worked as a team in the NBA on NBC's early years—would ultimately reunite on TNT. Pam Oliver, the then-lead sideline reporter for the NFL on Fox, joined Turner Sports in 2004 as she would only be on during the NBA playoffs, a role she fulfilled until 2009.

== Music ==
TNT's NBA game theme was written by composer Trevor Rabin, which was used from the 2002–03 NBA season, but was later carried over to ESPN's NBA coverage for Inside the NBA. Previous themes for TNT were composed by Michael Abbott and Greg Smith, Edd Kalehoff, Big Bad Voodoo Daddy, Jimmy Jam and Terry Lewis.

During the 2025 playoffs, producer Erron Banks was credited for TNT's utilization of regional hip-hop music during the scoring bumpers or 10-to-15-second clips that preceded the commercial breaks.

== In media ==
In the video games NBA 07, NBA 08 and NBA 09: The Inside, made by Sony Computer Entertainment for the PlayStation 2, PlayStation Portable and PlayStation 3 consoles, graphics for TNT's NBA games are seen when playing an exhibition, playoff, preseason, or seasonal game. NBA 10: The Inside on the PSP reuses the same graphics, but replaces the TNT logo with the NBA Jumpman logo.

A direct copy of TNT's graphics can also be seen on Cartoon Network's weekly basketball program, Run It Back, a program similar to Inside Stuff.

== See also ==
- NBA on television

== Notes ==
Records
Preceded by None	NBA pay television carrier 1989–2025 with TBS (1989–2002) with ESPN (2002–2025)	Succeeded by NBCSN/Peacock; Prime Video
