= NBA 07 =

2006 basketball video game

- Developers: San Diego Studio; A.C.R.O.N.Y.M. Games
- Publisher: Sony Computer Entertainment
- Platforms: PlayStation 2, PlayStation 3, PlayStation Portable
- Release: NA: September 25, 2006 (PS2, PSP); NA: November 14, 2006 (PS3)
- Genre: Sports
- Modes: Single player Multiplayer

NBA 07 is a basketball video game which was released on September 26, 2006. It was developed by San Diego Studio for the PlayStation 3 and PlayStation Portable versions and by A.C.R.O.N.Y.M. Games for the PlayStation 2 version. It is the second installment of the NBA series by Sony Computer Entertainment, and the first one for the PlayStation 3. It was one of three PlayStation 3 titles released at launch (Marvel: Ultimate Alliance and Ridge Racer 7) that supported the 1080p high definition video output. Kobe Bryant of the Los Angeles Lakers served as the cover athlete.

== Gameplay ==
On all consoles, the game uses graphics from TNT's NBA coverage.

== Reception ==
NBA 07

Aggregate score
Aggregator	Score		
Aggregator	PS2	PS3	PSP
Metacritic	63/100	63/100	68/100

Review scores
Publication	Score		
Publication	PS2	PS3	PSP
Electronic Gaming Monthly	N/A	5.5/10	N/A
Famitsu	N/A	26/40	N/A
Game Informer	N/A	7/10	N/A
GamePro	3.5/5	3.25/5	N/A
GameRevolution	N/A	C−	N/A
GameSpot	6.8/10	4.9/10	5.9/10
GameSpy	3/5	N/A	3/5
GameTrailers	N/A	4.8/10	N/A
GameZone	7/10	6.9/10	8.9/10
IGN	7/10	7.8/10	8/10
Official U.S. PlayStation Magazine	4/10	5/10	N/A
PlayStation: The Official Magazine	5/10	6.5/10	7.5/10
411Mania	N/A	4/10	N/A

NBA 07 received "mixed or average reviews" according to Metacritic. In Japan, where the PlayStation 3 version was ported for release on January 11, 2007, Famitsu gave it a score of 26 out of 40.

=== Awards ===
- AIAS Nomination (10th Annual Interactive Achievement Awards): 2006's Sports Game of the Year

Preceded by NBA 06	NBA 07	Succeeded by NBA 08
