= 2021 NBA playoffs =

North American basketball tournament

Tournament details
- Dates: May 22 – July 20, 2021
- Season: 2020–21
- Teams: 16

Final positions
- Champions: Milwaukee Bucks (2nd title)
- Runners-up: Phoenix Suns
- Semifinalists: Atlanta Hawks; Los Angeles Clippers

Tournament statistics
- Scoring leader(s): Giannis Antetokounmpo (Bucks) (30.2 PPG)

Awards
- MVP: Giannis Antetokounmpo (Bucks)

The 2021 NBA playoffs was the postseason tournament of the National Basketball Association's 2020–21 season. Due to COVID-19 pandemic impacting the NBA for the second consecutive year, the regular season was reduced to 72 games for each team and the start date was moved to May from its usual mid-April. It began on May 22 and concluded on July 20 with the Milwaukee Bucks defeating the Phoenix Suns in the 2021 NBA Finals. It was Milwaukee's second NBA championship, after 1971. The Bucks were also the fifth team in NBA Finals history to overcome a 2–0 deficit.

The Los Angeles Lakers were the defending champions, but lost to the Suns in the first round. With the Miami Heat losing to the Bucks in the first round, this marked the first time since 2007 that the previous year's finalists were eliminated in the first round.

The Los Angeles Clippers appeared in the conference finals for the first time in franchise history.

It was the first year the NBA used a 20-team playoff, with a two-stage system in both conferences, with 16 of the 20 teams advancing to the second stage. The first stage, the NBA play-in games, was a four-team playoff in each conference for the No. 7 to No. 10 seeds in each conference. In this format, the No. 7 and No. 8 teams need to win one game to advance to the second stage, with a double chance, while the No. 9 and No. 10 teams need to win two games to advance, eliminated by just one loss.

== Overview ==
=== Notable updates to postseason appearances ===
- The Portland Trail Blazers entered their eighth consecutive postseason, which was the longest active streak in the NBA until their failure to qualify the following year.
- The Boston Celtics entered their seventh consecutive postseason.
- Both the Utah Jazz and Milwaukee Bucks entered their fifth consecutive postseason.
  - Milwaukee also advanced to their first NBA Finals since 1974 and this was the Bucks' first Eastern Conference championship in franchise history as the team was in the Western Conference until 1980.
- The Philadelphia 76ers entered their fourth consecutive postseason.
- The Brooklyn Nets, Los Angeles Clippers, and Denver Nuggets all entered their third consecutive postseason.
- The Miami Heat, Los Angeles Lakers, and Dallas Mavericks all entered their second consecutive postseason.
- The Washington Wizards made their first postseason appearance since 2018.
- The Atlanta Hawks (which entered their first Conference finals appearance since 2015) and Memphis Grizzlies made their first postseason appearance since 2017.
- The New York Knicks made their first postseason appearance since 2013.
- The Phoenix Suns made their first postseason appearance since 2010.
  - Phoenix also won the Western Conference and advanced to their first NBA Finals since 1993.
- The Houston Rockets missed the playoffs for the first time in nine years.
- The Toronto Raptors missed the playoffs for the first time in eight years.
- Both the Oklahoma City Thunder and Indiana Pacers missed the playoffs for the first time in six years.
- The Orlando Magic missed the playoffs for the first time in three years.
- The San Antonio Spurs returned to the postseason after missing the playoffs the previous year but were eliminated after losing to Memphis in the first stage of the Page–McIntyre system tournament.
- The Golden State Warriors returned to the postseason after missing the playoffs the previous year, being the first team to be eliminated from the Page–McIntyre system tournament with the double chance. They were the No. 8 seed, losing to the No. 7 Los Angeles Lakers in the first game of the first stage, then losing to No. 9 Memphis in the second game of the first stage.

=== Notable occurrences ===
- The Memphis Grizzlies became the first No. 9 seed to advance to the playoffs, defeating the Golden State Warriors in the second game of the first stage play–in.
- The Milwaukee Bucks swept the Miami Heat in the first round, marking the 45th straight year a sweep occurred in the NBA playoffs. The last year a sweep did not occur in the playoffs was 1976.
- With Miami not winning a road game, their streak of winning a road game in a playoff series ends at 23, a streak that started in 2011. This record would be surpassed by the Warriors in the following year.
- The Mavericks–Clippers series was the first of the 2021 playoffs to have a Game 7, making it the 22nd consecutive NBA postseason to feature a Game 7. The last time a Game 7 did not take place in the playoffs was 1999.
- Not counting the 2020 NBA playoffs which was held at a neutral site, the Mavericks–Clippers series was the first in NBA history where the road team won the first six games of a best–of–7 and the first since 1995 to have the road team win the first five games of a best–of–7.
- Both 2020 NBA finalists (Los Angeles Lakers and Miami Heat) were eliminated in the first round. This was the third time overall and the first since 2007 that this had happened, in which the Miami Heat were also one of the finalists who were eliminated.
- The Los Angeles Lakers first round loss to the Phoenix Suns marked the first time that the defending NBA champions was eliminated in the first round of the playoffs since the San Antonio Spurs in the 2015 playoffs.
- With the Boston Celtics, Dallas Mavericks, Los Angeles Lakers, and Miami Heat eliminated in the first round (along with the Cleveland Cavaliers, Detroit Pistons, Golden State Warriors, San Antonio Spurs, and Toronto Raptors failing to qualify for the playoffs), by the second round the 2021 playoffs ensured one team of its first championship in the 21st century.
- This Finals was the first since 1999 to not feature the Golden State Warriors, Los Angeles Lakers, Miami Heat, or San Antonio Spurs.
- This Finals was the first since 2014 to not include Andre Iguodala, who had played in the past six finals with the Golden State Warriors and Miami Heat.
- For the first time in his 18-year career, LeBron James lost a first-round playoffs series when the Los Angeles Lakers were eliminated by the Phoenix Suns in Game 6. This would happen again 3 years later.
- Damian Lillard set an NBA record of 12 three-point field goals made in a single playoff game, which was previously held by Klay Thompson in 2016.
- LeBron James became the only player in NBA history to be in the playoff top 10 for all five major statistical categories (points, rebounds, assists, blocks, and steals).
- Chris Paul became the first player to reach 15 assists with 0 turnovers three separate times in the NBA playoffs.
- Nikola Jokić joined Wilt Chamberlain and Kareem Abdul-Jabbar as the only players with 30 points, 20 rebounds, 10 assists in an NBA playoff game.
- Kevin Durant became the first player in NBA history with 45 points, 15 rebounds, and 10 assists in a single playoff game. He also set an NBA record for most points in a Game 7 with 48 against the Milwaukee Bucks.
- The Los Angeles Clippers became the first team in NBA history to overcome an 0–2 deficit twice in the same postseason. They also made it to the Western Conference finals for the first time in franchise history.
- With the Clippers advancing to the Western Conference finals to face the Suns, this ensured that a Pacific Division team played in the NBA Finals for the seventh consecutive postseason.
- The Milwaukee Bucks won a Game 7 on the road for the first time in franchise history.
- Neither the first–seeded team nor the second-seeded team made the Eastern Conference finals for the second straight year.
- The Atlanta Hawks became the fourth team in the last 40 years to reach the conference finals with a midseason coaching replacement.
- Neither first–seeded team made the conference finals for the first time since 1994.
- For the first time since the 2013 season, all four teams competing in the conference finals were different seed numbers (2, 3, 4, 5).
- Devin Booker joined Charles Barkley and LeBron James as the only players with 40–point triple–double in a conference finals game. He also joined Oscar Robertson and Luka Dončić as the only players with a 40–point triple–double before turning 25.
- Deandre Ayton became the first player in the shot–clock era with a 70+ FG% in any 12–game postseason span (min. 100 att), and the first since 1954–55 NBA season.
- Deandre Ayton became the first player in NBA history to average 15 points and 10 rebounds while shooting at least 65% from the field in a single postseason.
- Jae Crowder now owns the longest active finals streak when the Phoenix Suns made the NBA Finals, having also made it last year with Miami.
- Chris Paul became the oldest player in NBA history with 40+ points in a closeout game. He is also the second oldest player to drop 40 points in any playoff game.
- With Rajon Rondo losing in the Western Conference finals to the Suns, Shaquille O'Neal's 37–year streak of having a former teammate in the NBA Finals came to an end.
- The Phoenix Suns became the first team in NBA history to move on to the NBA Finals after missing the postseason in the prior ten seasons. They also held the worst record (.302 winning pct) in five seasons prior to an appearance in the final postseason round in the history of the NBA, NFL, NHL, or MLB.
- Both NBA finalists in the 2020–2021 season have not been in the finals for over two decades (the Suns in 1993, the Bucks in 1974).
- Trae Young became the second player in NBA history to average 28+ PPG and 9+ APG in a single playoff run (minimum 15 games, LeBron James in 2018).
- Trae Young tied LeBron James and Dirk Nowitzki by scoring the 4th most points in a Conference finals game with 48 against the Milwaukee Bucks.
- Giannis Antetokounmpo became the 5th player in NBA history with 9+ 30/10 games in a single postseason since 1963.
- By winning the 2021 Eastern Conference finals, the Milwaukee Bucks are the only NBA franchise to win both the Eastern & Western Conference Titles. However, the Warriors franchise achieved the same deeds when the East and the West were called "Divisions", before they were realigned as "Conferences" in the 1970-71 expansion. Before 1970–71, the teams emerged from the East and West playoff brackets were called Eastern Division Champions and Western Division Champions, respectively. The Philadelphia Warriors won the Eastern Division in 1956, while the San Francisco Warriors won the Western Division in 1964 and 1967. The Golden State Warriors also won 7 conference titles after 1970–71.
- Chris Paul joins Michael Jordan as the only players with 30+ points and 9+ assists in an NBA Finals debut. Jordan accomplished this feat in 1991. He also joined Kareem Abdul-Jabbar and Tim Duncan as players with 30+ points in an NBA Finals game age 36 or older.
- Deandre Ayton became the fourth player in the shot-clock era (since 1955) with at least 20 points, 15 rebounds, and shooting 80+ FG% in an NBA Finals game (Bill Russell, Kareem-Abdul Jabbar, Wilt Chamberlain). Ayton joins Abdul-Jabbar as the only players to do so in their Finals debuts.
- Chris Paul scored or assisted on 54 points in Game 1, the 3rd most in an NBA Finals debut all time (Allen Iverson with 61 in 2001, Michael Jordan with 60 in 1991).
- The Phoenix Suns became the third team to make 20+ three-point shots in a Finals game, joining the Cleveland Cavaliers, and the Golden State Warriors.
- Giannis Antetokounmpo joined Shaquille O'Neal as the only players with 40+ points and 10+ rebounds in back–to–back Finals games. He also scored 103 points through the first three Finals game of his career, ranking fourth behind Rick Barry (122), Allen Iverson (106), and Willis Reed (104).
- Devin Booker set a new record for most points for a player in his first NBA playoffs appearance, accumulating 601 points, overtaking Ricky Barry (521) and Julius Erving (518).
- The Suns became the first team in NBA history to lose a Finals game despite shooting better than 50% and keeping their opponent below at least 42%.
- Khris Middleton and Devin Booker became the 4th pair of opponents to put up at least 40 points in the same game.
- Devin Booker became the seventh player in NBA history to put up back–to–back 40 point games in the Finals. Booker is also the first Suns player to achieve this and is also the first overall to lose both of these games.
- Devin Booker's 82 points in Games 4 and 5 of the NBA Finals reflects the highest total of any player who lost consecutive Finals Games (John Havlicek and LeBron James each had 80 in consecutive games).
- Devin Booker joined Rick Barry as the only players to record at least ten 30 point games in their first postseason all time.
- The Suns became the first team in NBA history to lose a playoff game shooting at least 55% from the field and at least 60% from three.
- Giannis Antetokounmpo and Khris Middleton became the 2nd pair of teammates to record at least 500 points and 100 assists in a single postseason.
- Giannis Antetokounmpo, Jrue Holiday, and Khris Middleton became the 5th trio of teammates in NBA Finals history to record at least 25 points while shooting at least 50% from the field in the same game.
- Giannis Antetokounmpo became the 5th player in NBA Finals history to record at least 30 points, 5 assists, 5 rebounds, and 0 turnovers.
- Giannis Antetokounmpo became the 2nd player in NBA Finals history to record at least 3 games recording 40 points and 10 rebounds.
- With Giannis and Thanasis Antetokounmpo winning a championship this year, they join Kostas Antetokounmpo (2020 with Los Angeles Lakers) as the only sibling trio in NBA history to win a championship.
- Giannis Antetokounmpo became the 7th player in NBA Finals history to record a 50-point game. He also tied Bob Pettit for the most points scored in a Finals closeout game.
- Giannis Antetokounmpo became the 5th player in NBA Finals history to record at least 30 points, 5 assists, 5 rebounds, and 0 turnovers.
- Giannis Antetokounmpo became the 1st player in NBA Finals history to record 40 points, 10 rebounds, and 5 blocks in a game, then became the first to record 50 points, 10 rebounds, and 5 blocks in a game.
- Giannis Antetokounmpo recorded the second-most games in a single postseason scoring at least 30 points and 10 rebounds.
- Chris Paul became the 1st player in NBA history to blow four separate 2–0 series leads in a best–of–7 series.
- Giannis Antetokounmpo became the 3rd player in NBA history to win multiple regular–season MVPs, Defensive Player of the Year Award, and Finals MVP (Hakeem Olajuwon and Michael Jordan)
- Giannis Antetokounmpo became the 2nd player in NBA history to win multiple regular–season MVPs and Finals MVP while playing at the power forward position (Tim Duncan).
- Giannis Antetokounmpo became the 1st player in NBA Finals history to average 30 points, 10 rebounds, and 5 assists while shooting at least 60% FG. In addition, he is the 1st player in NBA Finals history to average 30 points, 10 rebounds, 5 assists, 1 block, and 1 steal while shooting at least 50% on field goals.
- Giannis Antetokounmpo became the 9th player in NBA history to win multiple MVPs and a Finals MVP. He joins Kareem Abdul-Jabbar and Tim Duncan as the only ones to do so at 26 years old or younger.
- Giannis Antetokounmpo became the first player in NBA history with 5 All-Star selections, 5 All-NBA selections, multiple MVPs, 1 Finals MVP, and 1 DPOY before turning 27 years old.
- Giannis Antetokounmpo tied Kevin Durant by averaging the 5th most PPG in an NBA Finals win with 35.2 (Durant averaged 35.2 PPG in 2017).
- Giannis Antetokounmpo became the 1st player in NBA history to win Most Improved Player, MVP, Defensive Player of the Year, and Finals MVP.
- Giannis Antetokounmpo became the fourth international player and third European player to win the Finals MVP, joining Hakeem Olajuwon (Nigeria) in 1994 and 1995, Tony Parker (France) in 2007, and Dirk Nowitzki (Germany) in 2011.
- The Milwaukee Bucks became the fifth team in NBA Finals history to overcome an 0–2 deficit and win the title. They also became the third team to win 4 consecutive games after being down 0–2. The last team to accomplish this feat is the 2006 Miami Heat.
- The Milwaukee Bucks became the second team in NBA playoff history to overcome an 0–2 deficit twice in the same postseason (2021 Los Angeles Clippers).
- The Milwaukee Bucks became the first team below the 2nd seed to win a championship since the Dallas Mavericks in 2011.

== Format ==
The NBA Board of Governors approved a format for the 2020–21 season to have a play-in tournament involving the teams that ranked 7th through 10th in each conference. The 7th-place team and 8th-place team participate in the double-chance game, with the winner advancing to the playoffs as the 7-seed. The loser then plays the winner of the elimination game between the 9th-place and 10th-place teams to determine the playoff's 8-seed. The NBA's regular playoff format would then proceed as normal. Furthermore, the winner of the match between the loser of the 7/8 game and the winner of the 9/10 game always plays on day 2 of the NBA playoffs to allow that team at least a day of rest.

Under the NBA's regular playoff format, the eight teams with the most wins in each conference qualified for the playoffs. The seedings were based on each team's record. Each conference's bracket was fixed; there was no reseeding. All rounds were best-of-seven series; the series ended when one team won four games, and that team advanced to the next round. All rounds, including the NBA Finals, were in a 2–2–1–1–1 format. In the conference playoffs, home court advantage went to the higher-seeded team (number one being the highest). Seeding was based on each team's regular season record within a conference; if two teams had the same record, standard tiebreaker rules were used. Conference seedings were ignored for the NBA Finals: Home court advantage went to the team with the better regular season record, and, if needed, ties were broken based on head-to-head record, followed by intra-conference record.

== Playoff qualifying ==
On April 25, 2021, the Utah Jazz became the first team to clinch a playoff spot. While noted in the below tables, division titles have no bearing on seeding.

=== Eastern Conference ===
Seed	Team	Record	Clinched				
Seed	Team	Record	Play-in berth	Playoff berth	Division title	Best record in conference	Best record in NBA
1	Philadelphia 76ers	49–23	—	April 28	May 14	May 14	—
2	Brooklyn Nets	48–24	—	April 27	—	—	—
3	Milwaukee Bucks	46–26	—	May 4	April 30	—	—
4	New York Knicks	41–31	—	May 12	—	—	—
5	Atlanta Hawks	41–31	—	May 12	May 15	—	—
6	Miami Heat	40–32	—	May 11	—	—	—
7	Boston Celtics	36–36	May 12	May 18	—	—	—
8	Washington Wizards	34–38	May 14	May 20	—	—	—

Indiana (34–38) and Charlotte (33–39) also secured play-in berths but did not advance to the playoffs.

=== Western Conference ===
Seed	Team	Record	Clinched				
Seed	Team	Record	Play-in berth	Playoff berth	Division title	Best record in conference	Best record in NBA
1	Utah Jazz	52–20	—	April 25	May 7	May 16	May 16
2	Phoenix Suns	51–21	—	April 28	May 14	—	—
3	Denver Nuggets	47–25	—	May 3	—	—	—
4	Los Angeles Clippers	47–25	—	May 3	—	—	—
5	Dallas Mavericks	42–30	—	May 14	May 7	—	—
6	Portland Trail Blazers	42–30	—	May 16	—	—	—
7	Los Angeles Lakers	42–30	May 16	May 19	—	—	—
8	Memphis Grizzlies	38–34	May 10	May 21	—	—	—

Golden State (39–33) and San Antonio (33–39) also secured play-in berths but did not advance to the playoffs.

=== Play-in tournament brackets ===
==== Eastern Conference ====
Play-in games
7	Boston	118
8	Washington	100
9	Indiana	144
10	Charlotte	117

No. 8 seed game
8	Washington	142
9	Indiana	115

Final seeds
7	Boston	No. 7 seed
8	Washington	No. 8 seed

Bold Game winner
Italic Team with home-court advantage

==== Western Conference ====
Play-in games
7	LA Lakers	103
8	Golden State	100
9	Memphis	100
10	San Antonio	96

No. 8 seed game
8	Golden State	112
9	Memphis	117 (OT)

Final seeds
7	LA Lakers	No. 7 seed
9	Memphis	No. 8 seed

Bold Game winner
Italic Team with home-court advantage

== Bracket ==
Teams in bold advanced to the next round. The numbers to the left of each team indicate the team's seeding in its conference, and the numbers to the right indicate the number of games the team won in that round. The division champions are marked by an asterisk. Teams with home court advantage, the higher seeded team, are shown in italics.

First round	Conference semifinals
**E1**	**Philadelphia***	**4**
E8	Washington	1
E1	Philadelphia*	3
**E5**	**Atlanta***	**4**
E4	New York	1
**E5**	**Atlanta***	**4**
**Eastern Conference**
**E3**	**Milwaukee***	**4**
E6	Miami	0
**E3**	**Milwaukee***	**4**
E2	Brooklyn	3
**E2**	**Brooklyn**	**4**
E7	Boston	1
**W1**	**Utah***	**4**
W8	Memphis	1
W1	Utah*	2
**W4**	**LA Clippers**	**4**
**W4**	**LA Clippers**	**4**
W5	Dallas*	3
**Western Conference**
**W3**	**Denver**	**4**
W6	Portland	2
W3	Denver	0
**W2**	**Phoenix***	**4**
**W2**	**Phoenix***	**4**
W7	LA Lakers	2

Conference finals
E5	Atlanta*	2
**E3**	**Milwaukee***	**4**
W4	LA Clippers	2
**W2**	**Phoenix***	**4**

NBA Finals
**E3**	**Milwaukee***	**4**
W2	Phoenix*	2

- * Division winner
- **Bold** Series winner
- Italic Team with home-court advantage

== First round ==
Note: Times are EDT (UTC−4) as listed by the NBA. If the venue is located in a different time zone, the local time is also given.

=== Eastern Conference first round ===
==== (1) Philadelphia 76ers vs. (8) Washington Wizards ====
TNT

May 23
1:00pm

Recap

Washington Wizards 118, Philadelphia 76ers 125
Scoring by quarter: 28–27, 34–34, 31–38, 25–26
Pts: Bradley Beal 33; Rebs: Bradley Beal 10; Asts: Russell Westbrook 14	Pts: Tobias Harris 37; Rebs: Ben Simmons 15; Asts: Ben Simmons 15
Philadelphia leads series, 1–0

Wells Fargo Center, Philadelphia, PA
Attendance: 11,160
Referees: Eric Lewis, Pat Fraher, Kevin Cutler

NBA TV

May 26
7:00pm

Recap

Washington Wizards 95, Philadelphia 76ers 120
Scoring by quarter: 24–35, 33–36, 23–23, 15–26
Pts: Bradley Beal 33; Rebs: Rui Hachimura 7 Asts: Russell Westbrook 11	Pts: Simmons, Embiid 22 each Rebs: Dwight Howard 11; Asts: Ben Simmons 8
Philadelphia leads series, 2–0

Wells Fargo Center, Philadelphia, PA
Attendance: 11,160
Referees: Marc Davis, Kevin Scott, Jacyn Goble

ESPN

May 29
7:00pm

Recap

Philadelphia 76ers 132, Washington Wizards 103
Scoring by quarter: 36–28, 36–30, 37–28, 23–17
Pts: Joel Embiid 36; Rebs: Tobias Harris 13; Asts: Ben Simmons 9	Pts: Russell Westbrook 26; Rebs: Russell Westbrook 12; Asts: Russell Westbrook 10
Philadelphia leads series, 3–0

Capital One Arena, Washington, D.C.
Attendance: 10,665
Referees: James Capers, Ben Taylor, Michael Smith

TNT

May 31
7:00pm

Recap

Philadelphia 76ers 114, Washington Wizards 122
Scoring by quarter: 31–28, 30–32, 19–32, 34–30
Pts: Tobias Harris 21; Rebs: Tobias Harris 13; Asts: Tobias Harris 5	Pts: Bradley Beal 27; Rebs: Russell Westbrook 21; Asts: Russell Westbrook 14
Philadelphia leads series, 3–1

Capital One Arena, Washington, D.C.
Attendance: 10,665
Referees: Kane Fitzgerald, Courtney Kirkland, Sean Corbin

NBA TV

June 2
7:00pm

Recap

Washington Wizards 112, Philadelphia 76ers 129
Scoring by quarter: 29–29, 34–36, 31–38, 18–26
Pts: Bradley Beal 32; Rebs: Russell Westbrook 8 Asts: Russell Westbrook 10	Pts: Seth Curry 30; Rebs: Ben Simmons 10; Asts: Ben Simmons 11
Philadelphia wins series, 4–1

Wells Fargo Center, Philadelphia, PA
Attendance: 15,523
Referees: Josh Tiven, Ed Malloy, Tre Maddox

Regular-season series
Philadelphia won 3–0 in the regular-season series

December 23, 2020

Recap

Washington Wizards 107, Philadelphia 76ers 113

Wells Fargo Center, Philadelphia, PA

January 6, 2021

Recap

Washington Wizards 136, Philadelphia 76ers 141

Wells Fargo Center, Philadelphia, PA

March 12, 2021

Recap

Philadelphia 76ers 127, Washington Wizards 101

Capital One Arena, Washington, D.C.

This was the sixth playoff meeting between these two teams, with the 76ers winning three of the first five meetings. During Game 2, Russell Westbrook suffered an ankle injury and was taken to the locker room. As he was being escorted, an unknown 76ers fan intentionally dropped popcorn on him, angering him.

Previous playoffs series
Philadelphia leads 3–2 in all-time playoff series

1971

Philadelphia 76ers 3, Baltimore Bullets 4

1971 Eastern Conference semifinals

1978

Philadelphia 76ers 2, Washington Bullets 4

1978 Eastern Conference finals

1980

Philadelphia 76ers 2, Washington Bullets 0

1980 Eastern Conference First Round

1985

Philadelphia 76ers 3, Washington Bullets 1

1985 Eastern Conference First Round

1986

Philadelphia 76ers 3, Washington Bullets 2

1986 Eastern Conference First Round

==== (2) Brooklyn Nets vs. (7) Boston Celtics ====
ABC

May 22
8:00pm

Recap

Boston Celtics 93, Brooklyn Nets 104
Scoring by quarter: 21–16, 32–31, 20–31, 20–26
Pts: Jayson Tatum 22; Rebs: Tristan Thompson 10; Asts: Smart, Tatum 5 each	Pts: Kevin Durant 32; Rebs: Kevin Durant 12; Asts: James Harden 8
Brooklyn leads series, 1–0

Barclays Center, Brooklyn, New York City
Attendance: 14,391
Referees: Josh Tiven, Courtney Kirkland, Scott Wall

TNT

May 25
7:30pm

Recap

Boston Celtics 108, Brooklyn Nets 130
Scoring by quarter: 26–40, 21–31, 35–38, 26–21
Pts: Marcus Smart 19; Rebs: Tristan Thompson 11; Asts: Kemba Walker 7	Pts: Kevin Durant 26; Rebs: Brown, Durant 8 each Asts: James Harden 7
Brooklyn leads series, 2–0

Barclays Center, Brooklyn, New York City
Attendance: 14,774
Referees: James Capers, Ken Mauer, Sean Corbin

ABC

May 28
8:30pm

Recap

Brooklyn Nets 119, Boston Celtics 125
Scoring by quarter: 32–33, 25–28, 27–35, 35–29
Pts: James Harden 41; Rebs: Kevin Durant 9 Asts: James Harden 10	Pts: Jayson Tatum 50; Rebs: Tristan Thompson 13; Asts: Jayson Tatum 7
Brooklyn leads series, 2–1

TD Garden, Boston, MA
Attendance: 4,789
Referees: Eric Lewis, Curtis Blair, Brent Barnaky

TNT

May 30
7:00pm

Recap

Brooklyn Nets 141, Boston Celtics 126
Scoring by quarter: 33–34, 40–26, 39–31, 29–35
Pts: Kevin Durant 42; Rebs: Kyrie Irving 11; Asts: James Harden 18	Pts: Jayson Tatum 40; Rebs: Jayson Tatum 7 Asts: Marcus Smart 9
Brooklyn leads series, 3–1

TD Garden, Boston, MA
Attendance: 17,226
Referees: John Goble, Rodney Mott, Kevin Cutler

TNT

June 1
7:30pm

Recap

Boston Celtics 109, Brooklyn Nets 123
Scoring by quarter: 24–31, 27–28, 28–27, 30–37
Pts: Jayson Tatum 32; Rebs: Tatum, Thompson 9 each Asts: Jayson Tatum 5	Pts: James Harden 34; Rebs: James Harden 10; Asts: James Harden 10
Brooklyn wins series, 4–1

Barclays Center, Brooklyn, New York City
Attendance: 14,993
Referees: Zach Zarba, Ben Taylor, Michael Smith

Regular-season series
Brooklyn won 3–0 in the regular-season series

December 25, 2020

Recap

Brooklyn Nets 123, Boston Celtics 95

TD Garden, Boston, MA

March 11, 2021

Recap

Boston Celtics 109, Brooklyn Nets 121

Barclays Center, Brooklyn, New York City

April 23, 2021

Recap

Boston Celtics 104, Brooklyn Nets 109

Barclays Center, Brooklyn, New York City

This was the third playoff meeting between these two teams, but the first since the New Jersey Nets relocated to Brooklyn and became the Brooklyn Nets in 2012, with the Nets winning the first two meetings. After Game 4, a Celtics fan was arrested for throwing a water bottle at Kyrie Irving which nearly struck him.

Previous playoffs series
Brooklyn leads 2–0 in all-time playoff series

2002

Boston Celtics 2, New Jersey Nets 4

2002 Eastern Conference finals

2003

Boston Celtics 0, New Jersey Nets 4

2003 Eastern Conference semifinals

==== (3) Milwaukee Bucks vs. (6) Miami Heat ====
ESPN

May 22
2:00pm (1:00 pm CDT)

Recap

Miami Heat 107, Milwaukee Bucks 109 (OT)
Scoring by quarter: 24–22, 26–31, 28–27, 21–19, Overtime: 8–10
Pts: Goran Dragić 25; Rebs: Adebayo, Ariza 12 each Asts: Jimmy Butler 8	Pts: Khris Middleton 27; Rebs: Giannis Antetokounmpo 18; Asts: Khris Middleton 6
Milwaukee leads series, 1–0

Fiserv Forum, Milwaukee, WI
Attendance: 9,107
Referees: David Guthrie, Sean Wright, Tyler Ford

The Bucks struggled offensively against Miami, shooting only 16% (5–31) on three-point shots. The game went into overtime thanks to a game-tying, buzzer-beating layup by Jimmy Butler, but Milwaukee was able to pull away and win on a Khris Middleton jump shot, made with only 0.5 seconds left.

TNT

May 24
7:30pm (6:30 pm CDT)

Recap

Miami Heat 98, Milwaukee Bucks 132
Scoring by quarter: 20–46, 31–32, 27–29, 20–25
Pts: Dewayne Dedmon 19; Rebs: Dewayne Dedmon 9 Asts: Adebayo, Butler, Dragić 4 each	Pts: Giannis Antetokounmpo 31; Rebs: Giannis Antetokounmpo 13; Asts: Jrue Holiday 15
Milwaukee leads series, 2–0

Fiserv Forum, Milwaukee, WI
Attendance: 9,107
Referees: Marc Davis, Josh Tiven, Mark Lindsay

The Bucks erupted for 46 points in the first quarter, setting a new franchise playoff record, en route to a dominating 132–98 victory. The Bucks would make 22 three-pointers, after making only 5 in game 1.

TNT

May 27
6:30pm

Recap

Milwaukee Bucks 113, Miami Heat 84
Scoring by quarter: 26–14, 23–22, 37–24, 27–24
Pts: Khris Middleton 22; Rebs: Giannis Antetokounmpo 17; Asts: Jrue Holiday 12	Pts: Jimmy Butler 19; Rebs: Adebayo, Butler 8 each Asts: Jimmy Butler 6
Milwaukee leads series, 3–0

American Airlines Arena, Miami, FL
Attendance: 17,000
Referees: James Capers, Ken Mauer, Ed Malloy

The Bucks would cruise to another convincing victory in game 3, to take a commanding 3–0 series lead on Miami. In games 2 & 3, the Heat led for only 17 seconds, out of 96 minutes of game time.

TNT

May 29
12:30pm

Recap

Milwaukee Bucks 120, Miami Heat 103
Scoring by quarter: 22–26, 35–38, 34–21, 29–18
Pts: Brook Lopez 25; Rebs: Giannis Antetokounmpo 12; Asts: Giannis Antetokounmpo 15	Pts: Bam Adebayo 20; Rebs: Bam Adebayo 14; Asts: Jimmy Butler 10
Milwaukee wins series, 4–0

American Airlines Arena, Miami, FL
Attendance: 17,000
Referees: Zach Zarba, James Williams, Karl Lane

Though Miami built a 7-point lead at halftime, the Bucks went on a 24–6 run in the third quarter to take a lead they would not relinquish, leading to a four-game sweep of the Heat.

Regular-season series
Milwaukee won 2–1 in the regular-season series

December 29, 2020

Recap

Milwaukee Bucks 144, Miami Heat 97

American Airlines Arena, Miami, FL

December 30, 2020

Recap

Milwaukee Bucks 108, Miami Heat 119

American Airlines Arena, Miami, FL

May 15, 2021

Recap

Miami Heat 108, Milwaukee Bucks 122

Fiserv Forum, Milwaukee, WI

This was the third playoff meeting between these two teams, with the Heat winning the first two meetings.

Previous playoffs series
Miami leads 2–0 in all-time playoff series

2013

Milwaukee Bucks 0, Miami Heat 4

2013 Eastern Conference First Round

2020

Milwaukee Bucks 1, Miami Heat 4

2020 Eastern Conference semifinals

==== (4) New York Knicks vs. (5) Atlanta Hawks ====
TNT

May 23
7:00pm

Recap

Atlanta Hawks 107, New York Knicks 105
Scoring by quarter: 24–16, 28–34, 19–23, 36–32
Pts: Trae Young 32; Rebs: Clint Capela 13; Asts: Trae Young 10	Pts: Alec Burks 27; Rebs: Julius Randle 12; Asts: Derrick Rose 5
Atlanta leads series, 1–0

Madison Square Garden, New York City, NY
Attendance: 15,047
Referees: Tony Brothers, Ed Malloy, Derrick Collins

TNT

May 26
7:30pm

Recap

Atlanta Hawks 92, New York Knicks 101
Scoring by quarter: 27–20, 30–24, 18–32, 17–25
Pts: Trae Young 30; Rebs: Clint Capela 12; Asts: Trae Young 7	Pts: Derrick Rose 26; Rebs: Julius Randle 12; Asts: Rose, Randle 4 each
Series tied, 1–1

Madison Square Garden, New York City, NY
Attendance: 16,254
Referees: David Guthrie, Rodney Mott, Tom Washington

ESPN

May 28
7:00pm

Recap

New York Knicks 94, Atlanta Hawks 105
Scoring by quarter: 31–29, 13–29, 28–28, 22–19
Pts: Derrick Rose 30; Rebs: Julius Randle 11; Asts: Derrick Rose 5	Pts: Trae Young 21; Rebs: Clint Capela 12; Asts: Trae Young 14
Atlanta leads series, 2–1

State Farm Arena, Atlanta, GA
Attendance: 15,743
Referees: John Goble, Pat Fraher, Tyler Ford

ABC

May 30
1:00pm

Recap

New York Knicks 96, Atlanta Hawks 113
Scoring by quarter: 26–25, 23–28, 22–35, 25–25
Pts: Julius Randle 23; Rebs: Julius Randle 10; Asts: Julius Randle 7	Pts: Trae Young 27; Rebs: Clint Capela 15; Asts: Trae Young 9
Atlanta leads series, 3–1

State Farm Arena, Atlanta, GA
Attendance: 16,458
Referees: Scott Foster, Bill Kennedy, Mark Lindsay

TNT

June 2
7:30pm

Recap

Atlanta Hawks 103, New York Knicks 89
Scoring by quarter: 21–21, 31–26, 22–15, 29–27
Pts: Trae Young 36; Rebs: Clint Capela 15; Asts: Trae Young 9	Pts: Julius Randle 23; Rebs: Julius Randle 13; Asts: Rose, Barrett 5 each
Atlanta wins series, 4–1

Madison Square Garden, New York City, NY
Attendance: 16,512
Referees: Kane Fitzgerald, Courtney Kirkland, Brian Forte

In Game 1, Trae Young hits the game-winning floater with 0.9 seconds left.

Regular-season series
New York won 3–0 in the regular-season series

January 4, 2021

Recap

New York Knicks 113, Atlanta Hawks 108

State Farm Arena, Atlanta, GA

February 15, 2021

Recap

Atlanta Hawks 112, New York Knicks 123

Madison Square Garden, New York City, NY

April 21, 2021

Recap

Atlanta Hawks 127, New York Knicks 137 (OT)

Madison Square Garden, New York City, NY

This was the third playoff meeting between these two teams, with the Knicks winning the first two meetings.

Previous playoffs series
New York leads 2–0 in all-time playoff series

1971

Atlanta Hawks 1, New York Knicks 4

1971 Eastern Conference semifinals

1999

Atlanta Hawks 0, New York Knicks 4

1999 Eastern Conference semifinals

=== Western Conference first round ===
==== (1) Utah Jazz vs. (8) Memphis Grizzlies ====
TNT

May 23
9:30pm (7:30 pm MDT)

Recap

Memphis Grizzlies 112, Utah Jazz 109
Scoring by quarter: 17–24, 32–19, 34–31, 29–35
Pts: Dillon Brooks 31; Rebs: Jonas Valančiūnas 13; Asts: Ja Morant 4	Pts: Bojan Bogdanović 29; Rebs: Rudy Gobert 15; Asts: Mike Conley Jr. 11
Memphis leads series, 1–0

Vivint Arena, Salt Lake City, UT
Attendance: 13,750
Referees: James Capers, Ken Mauer, Dedric Taylor

TNT

May 26
10:00pm (8:00 pm MDT)

Recap

Memphis Grizzlies 129, Utah Jazz 141
Scoring by quarter: 27–36, 27–38, 43–29, 32–38
Pts: Ja Morant 47; Rebs: Valančiūnas, Anderson 6 each Asts: Ja Morant 7	Pts: Donovan Mitchell 25; Rebs: Rudy Gobert 13; Asts: Mike Conley Jr. 15
Series tied, 1–1

Vivint Arena, Salt Lake City, UT
Attendance: 14,200
Referees: Kane Fitzgerald, James Williams, JB DeRosa

ESPN

May 29
9:30pm (8:30 pm CDT)

Recap

Utah Jazz 121, Memphis Grizzlies 111
Scoring by quarter: 34–22, 28–29, 34–34, 25–26
Pts: Donovan Mitchell 29; Rebs: Rudy Gobert 14; Asts: Mike Conley Jr. 8	Pts: Ja Morant 28; Rebs: Valančiūnas, Anderson 13 each Asts: Ja Morant 7
Utah leads series, 2–1

FedExForum, Memphis, TN
Attendance: 12,185
Referees: Josh Tiven, Sean Wright, Derrick Collins

TNT

May 31
9:30pm (8:30 pm CDT)

Recap

Utah Jazz 120, Memphis Grizzlies 113
Scoring by quarter: 34–31, 25–23, 41–33, 20–26
Pts: Donovan Mitchell 30; Rebs: Royce O'Neale 9 Asts: Donovan Mitchell 8	Pts: Ja Morant 23; Rebs: Jonas Valančiūnas 12; Asts: Ja Morant 12
Utah leads series, 3–1

FedExForum, Memphis, TN
Attendance: 12,185
Referees: David Guthrie, Kevin Scott, Tre Maddox

NBA TV

June 2
9:30pm (7:30 pm MDT)

Recap

Memphis Grizzlies 110, Utah Jazz 126
Scoring by quarter: 27–47, 24–28, 25–31, 34–20
Pts: Brooks, Morant 27 each Rebs: Jackson Jr., Morant 7 each Asts: Ja Morant 11	Pts: Donovan Mitchell 30; Rebs: Rudy Gobert 15; Asts: Donovan Mitchell 10
Utah wins series, 4–1

Vivint Arena, Salt Lake City, UT
Attendance: 14,250
Referees: Marc Davis, Tony Brothers, Tyler Ford

Regular-season series
Utah won 3–0 in the regular-season series

March 26, 2021

Recap

Memphis Grizzlies 114, Utah Jazz 117

Vivint Arena, Salt Lake City, UT

March 27, 2021

Recap

Memphis Grizzlies 110, Utah Jazz 126

Vivint Arena, Salt Lake City, UT

March 31, 2021

Recap

Utah Jazz 111, Memphis Grizzlies 107

FedExForum, Memphis, TN

This was the first playoff meeting between the Jazz and the Grizzlies.

==== (2) Phoenix Suns vs. (7) Los Angeles Lakers ====
ABC

May 23
3:30pm (12:30pm MST)

Recap

Los Angeles Lakers 90, Phoenix Suns 99
Scoring by quarter: 25–32, 20–21, 23–28, 22–18
Pts: LeBron James 18; Rebs: Andre Drummond 9 Asts: LeBron James 10	Pts: Devin Booker 34; Rebs: Deandre Ayton 16; Asts: Booker, Paul 8 each
Phoenix leads series, 1–0

Phoenix Suns Arena, Phoenix, AZ
Attendance: 11,824
Referees: Kane Fitzgerald, Bill Kennedy, Rodney Mott

TNT

May 25
10:00pm (7:00pm MST)

Recap

Los Angeles Lakers 109, Phoenix Suns 102
Scoring by quarter: 30–24, 23–23, 26–25, 30–30
Pts: Anthony Davis 34; Rebs: Andre Drummond 12; Asts: LeBron James 9	Pts: Devin Booker 31; Rebs: Deandre Ayton 10; Asts: Cameron Payne 7
Series tied, 1–1

Phoenix Suns Arena, Phoenix, AZ
Attendance: 11,919
Referees: Zach Zarba, Tre Maddox, Brian Forte

TNT

May 27
10:00pm (7:00pm PDT)

Recap

Phoenix Suns 95, Los Angeles Lakers 109
Scoring by quarter: 28–27, 12–16, 23–33, 32–33
Pts: Deandre Ayton 22; Rebs: Deandre Ayton 11; Asts: Booker, Paul, Payne 6 each	Pts: Anthony Davis 34; Rebs: Davis, Drummond 11 each Asts: LeBron James 9
LA Lakers lead series, 2–1

Staples Center, Los Angeles, CA
Attendance: 7,825
Referees: Scott Foster, Sean Wright, Sean Corbin

ABC

May 30
3:30pm (12:30pm PDT)

Recap

Phoenix Suns 100, Los Angeles Lakers 92
Scoring by quarter: 23–24, 31–26, 27–15, 19–27
Pts: Chris Paul 18; Rebs: Deandre Ayton 17; Asts: Chris Paul 9	Pts: LeBron James 25; Rebs: LeBron James 12; Asts: LeBron James 6
Series tied, 2–2

Staples Center, Los Angeles, CA
Attendance: 8,025
Referees: Marc Davis, Tony Brothers, Brent Barnaky

TNT

June 1
10:00pm (7:00pm MST)

Recap

Los Angeles Lakers 85, Phoenix Suns 115
Scoring by quarter: 26–34, 10–32, 27–26, 22–23
Pts: LeBron James 24; Rebs: Andre Drummond 13; Asts: LeBron James 7	Pts: Devin Booker 30; Rebs: Ayton, Booker, Craig 7 each Asts: Chris Paul 6
Phoenix leads series, 3–2

Phoenix Suns Arena, Phoenix, AZ
Attendance: 16,163
Referees: James Capers, Ken Mauer, Curtis Blair

TNT

June 3
10:30pm (7:30pm PDT)

Recap

Phoenix Suns 113, Los Angeles Lakers 100
Scoring by quarter: 36–14, 26–27, 27–35, 24–24
Pts: Devin Booker 47; Rebs: Devin Booker 11; Asts: Chris Paul 12	Pts: LeBron James 29; Rebs: LeBron James 9 Asts: Gasol, James 7 each
Phoenix wins series, 4–2

Staples Center, Los Angeles, CA
Attendance: 8,550
Referees: David Guthrie, Ben Taylor, Tom Washington

Regular-season series
Phoenix won 2–1 in the regular-season series

March 2, 2021

Recap

Phoenix Suns 114, Los Angeles Lakers 104

Staples Center, Los Angeles, CA

March 21, 2021

Recap

Los Angeles Lakers 94, Phoenix Suns 111

Phoenix Suns Arena, Phoenix, AZ

May 9, 2021

Recap

Phoenix Suns 110, Los Angeles Lakers 123

Staples Center, Los Angeles, CA

This was the 13th playoff meeting between these two teams, with the Lakers winning eight of the first 12 meetings.

Previous playoffs series
LA Lakers leads 8–4 in all-time playoff series

1970

Los Angeles Lakers 4, Phoenix Suns 3

1970 Western Division semifinals

1980

Los Angeles Lakers 4, Phoenix Suns 1

1980 Western Conference semifinals

1982

Los Angeles Lakers 4, Phoenix Suns 0

1982 Western Conference semifinals

1984

Los Angeles Lakers 4, Phoenix Suns 2

1984 Western Conference finals

1985

Los Angeles Lakers 3, Phoenix Suns 0

1985 Western Conference First Round

1989

Los Angeles Lakers 4, Phoenix Suns 0

1989 Western Conference finals

1990

Los Angeles Lakers 1, Phoenix Suns 4

1990 Western Conference semifinals

1993

Los Angeles Lakers 2, Phoenix Suns 3

1993 Western Conference First Round

2000

Los Angeles Lakers 4, Phoenix Suns 1

2000 Western Conference semifinals

2006

Los Angeles Lakers 3, Phoenix Suns 4

2006 Western Conference First Round

2007

Los Angeles Lakers 1, Phoenix Suns 4

2007 Western Conference First Round

2010

Los Angeles Lakers 4, Phoenix Suns 2

2010 Western Conference finals

==== (3) Denver Nuggets vs. (6) Portland Trail Blazers ====
ESPN

May 22
10:30pm (8:30 pm MDT)

Recap

Portland Trail Blazers 123, Denver Nuggets 109
Scoring by quarter: 35–30, 23–31, 38–25, 27–23
Pts: Damian Lillard 34; Rebs: Jusuf Nurkić 12; Asts: Damian Lillard 13	Pts: Nikola Jokić 34; Rebs: Nikola Jokić 16; Asts: Campazzo, Morris 5 each
Portland leads series, 1–0

Ball Arena, Denver, CO
Attendance: 7,732
Referees: Marc Davis, Kevin Scott, Curtis Blair

TNT

May 24
10:00pm (8:00pm MDT)

Recap

Portland Trail Blazers 109, Denver Nuggets 128
Scoring by quarter: 25–31, 36–42, 26–28, 22–27
Pts: Damian Lillard 42; Rebs: Jusuf Nurkić 13; Asts: Damian Lillard 10	Pts: Nikola Jokić 38; Rebs: Nikola Jokić 8 Asts: Monté Morris 7
Series tied, 1–1

Ball Arena, Denver, CO
Attendance: 7,727
Referees: John Goble, Ben Taylor, Michael Smith

NBA TV

May 27
10:30pm (7:30pm PDT)

Recap

Denver Nuggets 120, Portland Trail Blazers 115
Scoring by quarter: 39–30, 25–29, 20–20, 36–36
Pts: Nikola Jokić 36; Rebs: Nikola Jokić 11; Asts: Facundo Campazzo 8	Pts: Damian Lillard 37; Rebs: Jusuf Nurkić 13; Asts: Jusuf Nurkić 6
Denver leads series, 2–1

Moda Center, Portland, OR
Attendance: 8,050
Referees: Zach Zarba, Tony Brothers, Karl Lane

TNT

May 29
4:00pm (1:00pm PDT)

Recap

Denver Nuggets 95, Portland Trail Blazers 115
Scoring by quarter: 24–32, 23–25, 19–36, 29–22
Pts: Nikola Jokić 16; Rebs: Nikola Jokić 9 Asts: Facundo Campazzo 7	Pts: Norman Powell 29; Rebs: Robert Covington 9 Asts: Damian Lillard 10
Series tied, 2–2

Moda Center, Portland, OR
Attendance: 8,050
Referees: David Guthrie, Ed Malloy, Tom Washington

NBA TV

June 1
9:00pm (7:00pm MDT)

Recap

Portland Trail Blazers 140, Denver Nuggets 147 (2OT)
Scoring by quarter: 25–38, 37–27, 32–27, 27–29, Overtime: 14–14, 5–12
Pts: Damian Lillard 55; Rebs: Covington, Nurkić 11 each Asts: Damian Lillard 10	Pts: Nikola Jokić 38; Rebs: Michael Porter Jr. 12; Asts: Nikola Jokić 9
Denver leads series, 3–2

Ball Arena, Denver, CO
Attendance: 10,463
Referees: Eric Lewis, Sean Wright, Mark Lindsay

TNT

June 3
8:00pm (5:00pm PDT)

Recap

Denver Nuggets 126, Portland Trail Blazers 115
Scoring by quarter: 29–33, 32–35, 37–33, 28–14
Pts: Nikola Jokić 36; Rebs: JaMychal Green 9 Asts: Monté Morris 9	Pts: Damian Lillard 28; Rebs: Robert Covington 10; Asts: Damian Lillard 13
Denver wins series, 4–2

Moda Center, Portland, OR
Attendance: 10,022
Referees: James Capers, Bill Kennedy, Rodney Mott

Regular-season series
Denver won 2–1 in the regular-season series

February 23, 2021

Recap

Portland Trail Blazers 106, Denver Nuggets 111

Ball Arena, Denver, CO

April 21, 2021

Recap

Denver Nuggets 106, Portland Trail Blazers 105

Moda Center, Portland, OR

May 16, 2021

Recap

Denver Nuggets 116, Portland Trail Blazers 132

Moda Center, Portland, OR

This was the fourth playoff meeting between these two teams, with Portland winning two of the first three meetings.

Previous playoffs series
Portland leads 2–1 in all-time playoff series

1977

Denver Nuggets 2, Portland Trail Blazers 4

1977 Western Conference semifinals

1986

Denver Nuggets 3, Portland Trail Blazers 1

1986 Western Conference First Round

2019

Denver Nuggets 3, Portland Trail Blazers 4

2019 Western Conference semifinals

==== (4) Los Angeles Clippers vs. (5) Dallas Mavericks ====
ESPN

May 22
4:30pm (1:30 pm PDT)

Recap

Dallas Mavericks 113, Los Angeles Clippers 103
Scoring by quarter: 33–30, 27–25, 26–25, 27–23
Pts: Luka Dončić 31; Rebs: Luka Dončić 10; Asts: Luka Dončić 11	Pts: Kawhi Leonard 26; Rebs: Kawhi Leonard 10; Asts: George, Leonard 5 each
Dallas leads series, 1–0

Staples Center, Los Angeles, CA
Attendance: 6,117
Referees: Zach Zarba, Tre Maddox, Brian Forte

NBA TV

May 25
10:30pm (7:30pm PDT)

Recap

Dallas Mavericks 127, Los Angeles Clippers 121
Scoring by quarter: 35–33, 36–40, 30–19, 26–29
Pts: Luka Dončić 39; Rebs: Luka Dončić 7 Asts: Luka Dončić 7	Pts: Kawhi Leonard 41; Rebs: Paul George 12; Asts: Rajon Rondo 7
Dallas leads series, 2–0

Staples Center, Los Angeles, CA
Attendance: 6,885
Referees: Scott Foster, Bill Kennedy, Curtis Blair

ESPN

May 28
9:30pm (8:30pm CDT)

Recap

Los Angeles Clippers 118, Dallas Mavericks 108
Scoring by quarter: 31–34, 32–27, 26–25, 29–22
Pts: Kawhi Leonard 36; Rebs: Kawhi Leonard 8 Asts: Rajon Rondo 8	Pts: Luka Dončić 44; Rebs: Luka Dončić 9 Asts: Luka Dončić 9
Dallas leads series, 2–1

American Airlines Center, Dallas, TX
Attendance: 17,705
Referees: Kane Fitzgerald, Courtney Kirkland, Mark Lindsay

TNT

May 30
9:30pm (8:30pm CDT)

Recap

Los Angeles Clippers 106, Dallas Mavericks 81
Scoring by quarter: 31–22, 30–23, 21–15, 24–21
Pts: Kawhi Leonard 29; Rebs: Kawhi Leonard 10; Asts: Rajon Rondo 4	Pts: Luka Dončić 19; Rebs: Dorian Finney-Smith 8 Asts: Luka Dončić 6
Series tied, 2–2

American Airlines Center, Dallas, TX
Attendance: 17,761
Referees: Eric Lewis, Pat Fraher, Tyler Ford

TNT

June 2
10:00pm (7:00pm PDT)

Recap

Dallas Mavericks 105, Los Angeles Clippers 100
Scoring by quarter: 35–28, 21–26, 33–21, 16–25
Pts: Luka Dončić 42; Rebs: Luka Dončić 8 Asts: Luka Dončić 14	Pts: Paul George 23; Rebs: Ivica Zubac 11; Asts: George, Rondo 6 each
Dallas leads series, 3–2

Staples Center, Los Angeles, CA
Attendance: 7,428
Referees: John Goble, James Williams, Sean Corbin

ESPN

June 4
9:00pm (8:00pm CDT)

Recap

Los Angeles Clippers 104, Dallas Mavericks 97
Scoring by quarter: 26–28, 22–17, 25–32, 31–20
Pts: Kawhi Leonard 45; Rebs: Paul George 13; Asts: Paul George 6	Pts: Luka Dončić 29; Rebs: Boban Marjanović 9 Asts: Luka Dončić 11
Series tied, 3–3

American Airlines Center, Dallas, TX
Attendance: 18,324
Referees: Marc Davis, Ken Mauer, Curtis Blair

ABC

June 6
3:30pm (12:30pm PDT)

Recap

Dallas Mavericks 111, Los Angeles Clippers 126
Scoring by quarter: 38–35, 24–35, 23–30, 26–26
Pts: Luka Dončić 46; Rebs: Kristaps Porziņģis 11; Asts: Luka Dončić 14	Pts: Kawhi Leonard 28; Rebs: Kawhi Leonard 10; Asts: Paul George 10
LA Clippers win series, 4–3

Staples Center, Los Angeles, CA
Attendance: 7,342
Referees: Scott Foster, Josh Tiven, Sean Wright

The Clippers become the fifth team to win a best-of-seven playoff series after losing the first 2 games at home.

Regular-season series
Dallas won 2–1 in the regular-season series

December 27, 2020

Recap

Dallas Mavericks 124, Los Angeles Clippers 73

Staples Center, Los Angeles, CA

March 15, 2021

Recap

Los Angeles Clippers 109, Dallas Mavericks 99

American Airlines Center, Dallas, TX

March 17, 2021

Recap

Los Angeles Clippers 89, Dallas Mavericks 105

American Airlines Center, Dallas, TX

This was the second playoff meeting between these two teams, with the Clippers winning the first meeting.

Previous playoffs series
LA Clippers leads 1–0 in all-time playoff series

2020

Dallas Mavericks 2, Los Angeles Clippers 4

2020 Western Conference First Round

== Conference semifinals ==
Note: Times are EDT (UTC−4) as listed by the NBA. If the venue is located in a different time zone, the local time is also given.

=== Eastern Conference semifinals ===
This was the first time both Conference semifinals went seven games since 2001.

==== (1) Philadelphia 76ers vs. (5) Atlanta Hawks ====
ABC

June 6
1:00pm

Recap

Atlanta Hawks 128, Philadelphia 76ers 124
Scoring by quarter: 42–27, 32–27, 25–29, 29–41
Pts: Trae Young 35; Rebs: Clint Capela 10; Asts: Trae Young 10	Pts: Joel Embiid 39; Rebs: Tobias Harris 10; Asts: Ben Simmons 10
Atlanta leads series, 1–0

Wells Fargo Center, Philadelphia, PA
Attendance: 18,624
Referees: James Capers, Ben Taylor, Tom Washington

The Atlanta Hawks dominated during the early part of the game, leading by as much as 26 points. However, the 76ers performed a major rally, eventually cutting the deficit to just 3 points with a minute left in regulation. 20 seconds later, Bogdan Bogdanovic hit a clutch 3, but the 76ers would make it a 3-point game again with 28.7 seconds left. Joel Embiid then committed a clear path foul, giving Atlanta 2 free throws and possession of the ball. The Hawks sealed the game with Trae Young's alley-oop assist to John Collins. Trae Young secured a double-double with 35 points and 10 assists for The Hawks. Joel Embiid scored 39 points for the 76ers.

TNT

June 8
7:30pm

Recap

Atlanta Hawks 102, Philadelphia 76ers 118
Scoring by quarter: 20–33, 35–24, 29–34, 18–27
Pts: Gallinari, Young 21 each Rebs: John Collins 10; Asts: Trae Young 11	Pts: Joel Embiid 40; Rebs: Joel Embiid 13; Asts: Danny Green 8
Series tied, 1–1

Wells Fargo Center, Philadelphia, PA
Attendance: 18,624
Referees: Scott Foster, Tony Brothers, Ken Mauer

After the 76ers started the game up 20–4 with 6 minutes left in the 1st quarter, the Hawks rallied and the game remained close until the start of the 4th quarter, in which the 76ers blew the game open with a 14–0 run, resulting in the series being tied at a game apiece. Joel Embiid secured a double-double with 40 points and 13 rebounds, while Danny Green had 8 assists. Trae Young also scored a double-double with 21 points and 11 assists while John Collins grabbed 10 rebounds.

ESPN

June 11
7:30pm

Recap

Philadelphia 76ers 127, Atlanta Hawks 111
Scoring by quarter: 28–20, 33–36, 34–19, 32–36
Pts: Joel Embiid 27; Rebs: Joel Embiid 9 Asts: Joel Embiid 8	Pts: Trae Young 28; Rebs: Clint Capela 16; Asts: Trae Young 8
Philadelphia leads series, 2–1

State Farm Arena, Atlanta, GA
Attendance: 16,432
Referees: Zach Zarba, Kevin Scott, Courtney Kirkland

The 76ers cruised their way to victory throughout the entire game thanks in part to Joel Embiid's 27 points, 9 rebounds, and 8 assists. Trae Young scored 28 points and 8 assists in the losing effort for the Hawks.

TNT

June 14
7:30pm

Recap

Philadelphia 76ers 100, Atlanta Hawks 103
Scoring by quarter: 28–20, 34–29, 20–31, 18–23
Pts: Tobias Harris 20; Rebs: Joel Embiid 21; Asts: Ben Simmons 9	Pts: Trae Young 25; Rebs: Clint Capela 13; Asts: Trae Young 18
Series tied, 2–2

State Farm Arena, Atlanta, GA
Attendance: 16,502
Referees: John Goble, Josh Tiven, Curtis Blair

Despite being down by 18, the Atlanta Hawks staged a comeback, eventually taking their first lead since the 1st quarter at the start of the 4th quarter. The 76ers were up by 4 with 2:20 left in the 4th quarter, but the Hawks responded with a 7–0 run, leading by 3 with 49.6 seconds left. After Embiid got fouled and made both free throws to make it 101–100, and a turnover by John Collins, the 76ers had a chance at leading the series 3 games to 1. Embiid's go-ahead shot fell short and the ball went out of bounds, last touched by Ben Simmons, giving Atlanta the ball with 8.2 seconds left. After Trae Young made both of his free throws to make it a 3-point game, the 76ers had 6.6 seconds left to tie it, but Seth Curry's game-tying 3-pointer was no good, giving Atlanta the comeback victory.

TNT

June 16
7:30pm

Recap

Atlanta Hawks 109, Philadelphia 76ers 106
Scoring by quarter: 24–38, 16–24, 29–25, 40–19
Pts: Trae Young 39; Rebs: John Collins 11; Asts: Trae Young 7	Pts: Joel Embiid 37; Rebs: Joel Embiid 13; Asts: Ben Simmons 9
Atlanta leads series, 3–2

Wells Fargo Center, Philadelphia, PA
Attendance: 18,624
Referees: David Guthrie, Eric Lewis, Bill Kennedy

In the pivotal Game 5, the 76ers appeared to be on their way to victory, leading by as much as 26 points and with a 99.7% win probability according to ESPN. However, the Hawks, who came back from down 18 in the previous game, performed one of the most memorable comebacks in NBA Playoffs history. The Sixers were still up 104–94 with 4 minutes left in the game, only for the Hawks to respond with a 13–0 run to take a 3-point lead with 50 seconds left, their first lead of the entire game.

With 12 seconds left, a blocking foul by Danilo Gallinari sent Joel Embiid to the line with the Hawks leading by 3. He missed both free throws and Atlanta then had possession of the ball. Trae Young sealed it with 2 clutch free throws, and Seth Curry then made a meaningless basket to make the final score 109–106 in favor the Hawks, who were now one game away from their first conference finals berth since 2015. Once the final buzzer sounded, the 76ers' faithful booed their entire team off the floor due to the collapse.

Trae Young led the Hawks' comeback victory with 39 points and 7 assists.

The Hawks became the 6th team in NBA Playoffs history to win a playoff game after trailing by 18+ points entering the 4th quarter in the shot clock era.

ESPN

June 18
7:30pm

Recap

Philadelphia 76ers 104, Atlanta Hawks 99
Scoring by quarter: 22–29, 25–22, 33–25, 24–23
Pts: Curry, Harris 24 each Rebs: Joel Embiid 13; Asts: Ben Simmons 5	Pts: Trae Young 34; Rebs: Capela, Huerter 11 each Asts: Trae Young 12
Series tied, 3–3

State Farm Arena, Atlanta, GA
Attendance: 16,610
Referees: Scott Foster, Pat Fraher, James Williams

With the Hawks looking to advance to the Eastern Conference finals on their home floor, they led by as much as 12 points during the 2nd quarter. But the 76ers, who were trying to stave off elimination after back-to-back collapses, managed to take control of the game. However, the game once again would go down to the wire, as the Sixers were up 94–87 with 3 minutes left. The Hawks responded with 2 three-pointers from Gallinari and Young, who cut the deficit to one with 1:59 left in the 4th quarter. The lights at State Farm Arena went out, causing a one-minute delay. Once the lights came back on, Philadelphia immediately responded by preserving the lead as Tobias Harris would make 2 game-sealing free throws to send the series back to Philadelphia for Game 7 on Sunday night.

TNT

June 20
8:00pm

Recap

Atlanta Hawks 103, Philadelphia 76ers 96
Scoring by quarter: 25–28, 23–18, 28–25, 27–25
Pts: Kevin Huerter 27; Rebs: John Collins 16; Asts: Trae Young 10	Pts: Joel Embiid 31; Rebs: Tobias Harris 14; Asts: Ben Simmons 13
Atlanta wins series, 4–3

Wells Fargo Center, Philadelphia, PA
Attendance: 18,624
Referees: James Capers, Kane Fitzgerald, Sean Wright

In front of a loud Wells Fargo Center, Game 7 was a deadlocked affair, with neither team able to gain a double-digit lead. The game and the serie once again came down to the wire. With 1:12 left in the 4th quarter, the Hawks were leading, 93–92, and had the ball. Kevin Huerter attempted a 3-point shot that missed, but was fouled by Matisse Thybulle, sending him to the line where he made 3 free throws. On the next possession, Danilo Gallinari stripped Joel Embiid of the ball and then dunked to make it 98–92 in favor of the Hawks, who from that point on had complete control of the game. The Atlanta Hawks upset the top-seeded 76ers to advance to the Eastern Conference finals for the first time in 6 years.

Kevin Huerter was the Hawks' top scorer with 27 points, John Collins grabbed 16 rebounds and Trae Young had 10 assists.

For the Sixers, Joel Embiid scored 31 points, while Tobias Harris grabbed 14 rebounds.

Ben Simmons' Game 7 performance was criticized as he scored only 5 points with 13 assists. With 3:30 left in the 4th quarter and the Sixers down 2, Simmons passed up a wide open dunk and instead passed to Matisse Thybulle, who got fouled and split the free throws. Sixers' coach Doc Rivers was asked in his post-game conference if Simmons could be the point guard of a championship team, with Rivers responding "I don't know the answer to that right now". Joel Embiid cited the decision as the turning point of the game.

Eventually it would be Ben Simmons, Andre Drummond & Seth Curry's last playoff game as a 76er, as all of them were traded to the Brooklyn Nets on February 10, 2022.

It was Atlanta's first win over Philadelphia in any sport playoff series since 1978.

Regular-season series
Philadelphia won 2–1 in the regular-season series

January 11, 2021

Recap

Philadelphia 76ers 94, Atlanta Hawks 112

State Farm Arena, Atlanta, GA

April 28, 2021

Recap

Atlanta Hawks 83, Philadelphia 76ers 127

Wells Fargo Center, Philadelphia, PA

April 30, 2021

Recap

Atlanta Hawks 104, Philadelphia 76ers 126

Wells Fargo Center, Philadelphia, PA

This was the third playoff meeting between these two teams, with the 76ers winning both previous meetings.

Previous playoffs series
Philadelphia leads 2–0 in all-time playoff series

1980

Atlanta Hawks 1, Philadelphia 76ers 4

1980 Eastern Conference semifinals

1982

Atlanta Hawks 0, Philadelphia 76ers 2

1982 Eastern Conference First Round

==== (2) Brooklyn Nets vs. (3) Milwaukee Bucks ====
TNT

June 5
7:30pm

Recap

Milwaukee Bucks 107, Brooklyn Nets 115
Scoring by quarter: 32–30, 29–33, 23–35, 23–17
Pts: Giannis Antetokounmpo 34; Rebs: Khris Middleton 13; Asts: Jrue Holiday 6	Pts: Kevin Durant 29; Rebs: Blake Griffin 14; Asts: Kyrie Irving 8
Brooklyn leads series, 1–0

Barclays Center, Brooklyn, New York City
Attendance: 15,750
Referees: David Guthrie, Bill Kennedy, Mark Lindsay

TNT

June 7
7:30pm

Recap

Milwaukee Bucks 86, Brooklyn Nets 125
Scoring by quarter: 19–36, 22–29, 24–30, 21–30
Pts: Giannis Antetokounmpo 18; Rebs: Giannis Antetokounmpo 11; Asts: Giannis Antetokounmpo 4	Pts: Kevin Durant 32; Rebs: Blake Griffin 8 Asts: Durant, Irving 6 each
Brooklyn leads series, 2–0

Barclays Center, Brooklyn, New York City
Attendance: 15,776
Referees: Kane Fitzgerald, Pat Fraher, James Williams

ESPN

June 10
7:30pm (6:30pm CDT)

Recap

Brooklyn Nets 83, Milwaukee Bucks 86
Scoring by quarter: 11–30, 31–15, 23–22, 18–19
Pts: Kevin Durant 30; Rebs: Brown, Durant 11 each Asts: Kevin Durant 5	Pts: Khris Middleton 35; Rebs: Khris Middleton 15; Asts: Jrue Holiday 5
Brooklyn leads series, 2–1

Fiserv Forum, Milwaukee, WI
Attendance: 16,310
Referees: Marc Davis, Eric Lewis, Tyler Ford

ABC

June 13
3:00pm (2:00pm CDT)

Recap

Brooklyn Nets 96, Milwaukee Bucks 107
Scoring by quarter: 26–23, 22–30, 21–28, 27–26
Pts: Kevin Durant 28; Rebs: Kevin Durant 13; Asts: Kevin Durant 5	Pts: Giannis Antetokounmpo 34; Rebs: Giannis Antetokounmpo 12; Asts: Jrue Holiday 9
Series tied, 2–2

Fiserv Forum, Milwaukee, WI
Attendance: 16,310
Referees: Scott Foster, Tony Brothers, Ed Malloy

TNT

June 15
8:30pm

Recap

Milwaukee Bucks 108, Brooklyn Nets 114
Scoring by quarter: 29–15, 30–28, 28–38, 21–33
Pts: Giannis Antetokounmpo 34; Rebs: Giannis Antetokounmpo 12; Asts: Jrue Holiday 8	Pts: Kevin Durant 49; Rebs: Kevin Durant 17; Asts: Kevin Durant 10
Brooklyn leads series, 3–2

Barclays Center, Brooklyn, New York City
Attendance: 16,067
Referees: James Capers, Ken Mauer, Ben Taylor

ESPN

June 17
8:30pm (7:30pm CDT)

Recap

Brooklyn Nets 89, Milwaukee Bucks 104
Scoring by quarter: 19–26, 29–33, 19–19, 22–26
Pts: Kevin Durant 32; Rebs: Kevin Durant 11; Asts: James Harden 7	Pts: Khris Middleton 38; Rebs: Giannis Antetokounmpo 17; Asts: Holiday, Middleton 5 each
Series tied, 3–3

Fiserv Forum, Milwaukee, WI
Attendance: 16,310
Referees: Zach Zarba, Kane Fitzgerald, Courtney Kirkland

TNT

June 19
8:30pm

Recap

Milwaukee Bucks 115, Brooklyn Nets 111 (OT)
Scoring by quarter: 25–28, 22–25, 35–28, 27–28, Overtime: 6–2
Pts: Giannis Antetokounmpo 40; Rebs: Giannis Antetokounmpo 13; Asts: Jrue Holiday 8	Pts: Kevin Durant 48; Rebs: Blake Griffin 11; Asts: James Harden 9
Milwaukee wins series, 4–3

Barclays Center, Brooklyn, New York City
Attendance: 16,287
Referees: Marc Davis, John Goble, Josh Tiven

Game 7 would go on to be an instant classic with both teams locked in for the entire game. In the final seconds of regulation, Kevin Durant appeared to have given the Nets a 1-point lead on a fadeaway three-point shot with 1 second left. Replay showed, however, that his foot was on the line. With the score tied at 109, Milwaukee had a chance to win the series, but Giannis Antetokounmpo's turnaround jump shot missed, sending the game into overtime. The Nets held a two-point lead until the final 90 seconds of overtime where the Bucks would score on back-to-back possessions to get on the board and take a 113–111 lead with 40 seconds remaining. The Nets had possession in the last 15 seconds of the game, with Durant shooting a similar turnaround game-tying, almost-three-point jump shot; however, it was an airball. The Bucks subsequently sealed the game on two free throws by Brook Lopez (a former Net), sending them to the Eastern Conference finals for the second time in three years. This marked the first game seven to go into overtime since 2006 involving the Dallas Mavericks and the San Antonio Spurs, which the Mavericks won and prevented the team from blowing a 3–1 lead to the Spurs. It was also the Bucks' first victory on the road in a postseason game seven, having gone 0–7 in previous playoff road game 7s. It was also the third team in NBA playoff history to win game seven on the road in overtime joined the 2001–02 Los Angeles Lakers, and the 2005–06 Mavericks' team.

Regular-season series
Milwaukee won 2–1 in the regular-season series

January 18, 2021

Recap

Milwaukee Bucks 123, Brooklyn Nets 125

Barclays Center, Brooklyn, New York City

May 2, 2021

Recap

Brooklyn Nets 114, Milwaukee Bucks 117

Fiserv Forum, Milwaukee, WI

May 4, 2021

Recap

Brooklyn Nets 118, Milwaukee Bucks 124

Fiserv Forum, Milwaukee, WI

This was the fourth playoff meeting between these two teams, but the first since the New Jersey Nets relocated to Brooklyn and became the Brooklyn Nets in 2012, with the Bucks winning two of the first three meetings.

Previous playoffs series
Milwaukee leads 2–1 in all-time playoff series

1984

Milwaukee Bucks 4, New Jersey Nets 2

1984 Eastern Conference semifinals

1986

Milwaukee Bucks 3, New Jersey Nets 0

1986 Eastern Conference First Round

2003

Milwaukee Bucks 2, New Jersey Nets 4

2003 Eastern Conference First Round

=== Western Conference semifinals ===
==== (1) Utah Jazz vs. (4) Los Angeles Clippers ====
TNT

June 8
10:00pm (8:00 pm MDT)

Recap

Los Angeles Clippers 109, Utah Jazz 112
Scoring by quarter: 25–18, 35–29, 19–32, 30–33
Pts: Kawhi Leonard 23; Rebs: Paul George 10; Asts: Rajon Rondo 6	Pts: Donovan Mitchell 45; Rebs: Rudy Gobert 12; Asts: Joe Ingles 7
Utah leads series, 1–0

Vivint Arena, Salt Lake City, UT
Attendance: 18,007
Referees: John Goble, Eric Lewis, Brian Forte

ESPN

June 10
10:00pm (8:00 pm MDT)

Recap

Los Angeles Clippers 111, Utah Jazz 117
Scoring by quarter: 29–30, 24–36, 33–27, 25–24
Pts: Reggie Jackson 29; Rebs: Morris, George 10 each Asts: Paul George 6	Pts: Donovan Mitchell 37; Rebs: Rudy Gobert 20; Asts: Ingles, Mitchell 4 each
Utah leads series, 2–0

Vivint Arena, Salt Lake City, UT
Attendance: 18,007
Referees: Scott Foster, Tre Maddox, Kevin Cutler

ABC

June 12
8:30pm (5:30 pm PDT)

Recap

Utah Jazz 106, Los Angeles Clippers 132
Scoring by quarter: 23–27, 26–37, 34–30, 23–38
Pts: Donovan Mitchell 30; Rebs: Rudy Gobert 10; Asts: Donovan Mitchell 4	Pts: Kawhi Leonard 34; Rebs: Kawhi Leonard 12; Asts: George, Leonard 5 each
Utah leads series, 2–1

Staples Center, Los Angeles, CA
Attendance: 8,185
Referees: Kane Fitzgerald, James Williams, Michael Smith

TNT

June 14
10:00pm (7:00 pm PDT)

Recap

Utah Jazz 104, Los Angeles Clippers 118
Scoring by quarter: 13–30, 31–38, 29–26, 31–24
Pts: Donovan Mitchell 37; Rebs: O'Neale, Gobert 8 each Asts: Bogdanović, Mitchell 5 each	Pts: Leonard, George 31 each Rebs: Paul George 9 Asts: Batum, George 4 each
Series tied, 2–2

Staples Center, Los Angeles, CA
Attendance: 8,474
Referees: Zach Zarba, Sean Wright, Sean Corbin

TNT

June 16
10:00pm (8:00 pm MDT)

Recap

Los Angeles Clippers 119, Utah Jazz 111
Scoring by quarter: 36–37, 24–28, 32–18, 27–28
Pts: Paul George 37; Rebs: Paul George 16; Asts: Paul George 5	Pts: Bojan Bogdanović 32; Rebs: Rudy Gobert 10; Asts: Joe Ingles 6
LA Clippers leads series, 3–2

Vivint Arena, Salt Lake City, UT
Attendance: 18,007
Referees: John Goble, Josh Tiven, Curtis Blair

ESPN

June 18
10:00pm (7:00 pm PDT)

Recap

Utah Jazz 119, Los Angeles Clippers 131
Scoring by quarter: 33–31, 39–19, 22–41, 25–40
Pts: Donovan Mitchell 39; Rebs: Gobert, O'Neale 10 each Asts: Donovan Mitchell 9	Pts: Terance Mann 39; Rebs: Paul George 9 Asts: Reggie Jackson 10
LA Clippers wins series, 4–2

Staples Center, Los Angeles, CA
Attendance: 17,105
Referees: James Capers, Eric Lewis, Kevin Scott

The Clippers were trailing by 22 at the end of the first half in Game 6. They went down 25 at the start of the third quarter, before a retaliation led by Terance Mann allowed the Clippers to fight back to within 3 points at the end of the third quarter. In the fourth, the momentum from the third quarter and Utah's struggles allowed the Clippers to complete the comeback, becoming the first team to recover from being down 0–2 twice in the same playoffs, and reaching their first Conference finals in franchise history.

Regular-season series
Utah won 2–1 in the regular-season series

January 1, 2021

Recap

Los Angeles Clippers 100, Utah Jazz 106

Vivint Arena, Salt Lake City, UT

February 17, 2021

Recap

Utah Jazz 114, Los Angeles Clippers 96

Staples Center, Los Angeles, CA

February 19, 2021

Recap

Utah Jazz 112, Los Angeles Clippers 116

Staples Center, Los Angeles, CA

This was the fourth playoff meeting between these two teams, with the Jazz winning the previous three meetings.

Previous playoffs series
Utah leads 3–0 in all-time playoff series

1992

Los Angeles Clippers 2, Utah Jazz 3

1992 Western Conference First Round

1997

Los Angeles Clippers 0, Utah Jazz 3

1997 Western Conference First Round

2017

Los Angeles Clippers 3, Utah Jazz 4

2017 Western Conference First Round

==== (2) Phoenix Suns vs. (3) Denver Nuggets ====
TNT

June 7
10:00pm (7:00 pm MST)

Recap

Denver Nuggets 105, Phoenix Suns 122
Scoring by quarter: 28–28, 30–29, 21–31, 26–34
Pts: Nikola Jokić 22; Rebs: JaMychal Green 11; Asts: Campazzo, Morris 6 each	Pts: Mikal Bridges 23; Rebs: Deandre Ayton 10; Asts: Chris Paul 11
Phoenix leads series, 1–0

Phoenix Suns Arena, Phoenix, AZ
Attendance: 16,219
Referees: Marc Davis, Courtney Kirkland, Kevin Scott

TNT

June 9
9:30pm (6:30pm MST)

Recap

Denver Nuggets 98, Phoenix Suns 123
Scoring by quarter: 21–25, 21–27, 25–34, 31–37
Pts: Nikola Jokić 24; Rebs: Nikola Jokić 13; Asts: Nikola Jokić 6	Pts: Devin Booker 18; Rebs: Ayton, Booker 10 each Asts: Chris Paul 15
Phoenix leads series, 2–0

Phoenix Suns Arena, Phoenix, AZ
Attendance: 16,529
Referees: Zach Zarba, Josh Tiven, Bill Kennedy

ESPN

June 11
10:00pm (8:00pm MDT)

Recap

Phoenix Suns 116, Denver Nuggets 102
Scoring by quarter: 37–27, 22–28, 31–21, 26–26
Pts: Devin Booker 28; Rebs: Deandre Ayton 15; Asts: Chris Paul 8	Pts: Nikola Jokić 32; Rebs: Nikola Jokić 20; Asts: Nikola Jokić 10
Phoenix leads series, 3–0

Ball Arena, Denver, CO
Attendance: 18,277
Referees: James Capers, Sean Wright, Ben Taylor

TNT

June 13
8:00pm (6:00pm MDT)

Recap

Phoenix Suns 125, Denver Nuggets 118
Scoring by quarter: 28–22, 35–33, 33–28, 29–35
Pts: Chris Paul 37; Rebs: Devin Booker 11; Asts: Chris Paul 7	Pts: Will Barton 25; Rebs: Nikola Jokić 11; Asts: Monté Morris 6
Phoenix wins series, 4–0

Ball Arena, Denver, CO
Attendance: 18,290
Referees: David Guthrie, Pat Fraher, Rodney Mott

Regular-season series
Denver won 2–1 in the regular-season series

January 1, 2021

Recap

Phoenix Suns 106, Denver Nuggets 103

Ball Arena, Denver, CO

January 22, 2021

Recap

Denver Nuggets 130, Phoenix Suns 126 (OT)

Phoenix Suns Arena, Phoenix, AZ

January 23, 2021

Recap

Denver Nuggets 120, Phoenix Suns 112 (2OT)

Phoenix Suns Arena, Phoenix, AZ

This was the fourth playoff meeting between these two teams, with Phoenix winning two of the first three meetings.

Previous playoff series
Phoenix leads 2–1 in all-time playoff series

1982

Denver Nuggets 1, Phoenix Suns 2

1982 Western Conference First Round

1983

Denver Nuggets 2, Phoenix Suns 1

1983 Western Conference First Round

1989

Denver Nuggets 0, Phoenix Suns 3

1989 Western Conference First Round

== Conference finals ==
Note: Times are EDT (UTC−4) as listed by the NBA. If the venue is located in a different time zone, the local time is also given.

=== Eastern Conference finals ===
==== (3) Milwaukee Bucks vs. (5) Atlanta Hawks ====
TNT

June 23
8:30pm (7:30pm CDT)

Recap

Atlanta Hawks 116, Milwaukee Bucks 113
Scoring by quarter: 25–28, 29–31, 34–26, 28–28
Pts: Trae Young 48; Rebs: Clint Capela 19; Asts: Trae Young 11	Pts: Giannis Antetokounmpo 34; Rebs: Giannis Antetokounmpo 12; Asts: Jrue Holiday 10
Atlanta leads series, 1–0

Fiserv Forum, Milwaukee, WI
Attendance: 16,310
Referees: Zach Zarba, Eric Lewis, Tyler Ford

Atlanta's top offensive star, Trae Young, scored 48 points in his conference finals debut, while the Hawks rallied in the 2nd half to beat the Bucks in game 1 in Milwaukee, aided by 5 offensive rebounds in the final 2 minutes.

TNT

June 25
8:30pm (7:30pm CDT)

Recap

Atlanta Hawks 91, Milwaukee Bucks 125
Scoring by quarter: 28–34, 17–43, 18–26, 28–22
Pts: Trae Young 15; Rebs: Capela, Collins 8 each Asts: Bogdan Bogdanović 4	Pts: Giannis Antetokounmpo 25; Rebs: Giannis Antetokounmpo 9 Asts: Khris Middleton 8
Series tied, 1–1

Fiserv Forum, Milwaukee, WI
Attendance: 16,422
Referees: Scott Foster, Pat Fraher, Courtney Kirkland

The Bucks rode a 20–0 scoring run in the 2nd quarter to run away with a game 2 victory.

TNT

June 27
8:30pm

Recap

Milwaukee Bucks 113, Atlanta Hawks 102
Scoring by quarter: 27–32, 29–24, 27–29, 30–17
Pts: Khris Middleton 38; Rebs: Antetokounmpo, Middleton 11 each Asts: Jrue Holiday 12	Pts: Trae Young 35; Rebs: Clint Capela 11; Asts: Kevin Huerter 7
Milwaukee leads series, 2–1

State Farm Arena, Atlanta, GA
Attendance: 16,650
Referees: Marc Davis, Sean Wright, Kevin Scott

Trailing by 2 points going into the 4th quarter, the Bucks' Khris Middleton would carry Milwaukee to victory in game 3, outscoring Atlanta in the final quarter by himself, 20–17, en route to a game-high 38 points, putting the Bucks back in the lead in the series and getting back homecourt advantage. Atlanta's loss was also compounded when Trae Young suffered a bruised foot when he rolled his ankle over a referee's foot, leaving his status for the rest of the series in doubt.

TNT

June 29
8:30pm

Recap

Milwaukee Bucks 88, Atlanta Hawks 110
Scoring by quarter: 22–25, 16–26, 24–36, 26–23
Pts: Jrue Holiday 19; Rebs: Antetokounmpo, Middleton 8 each Asts: Jrue Holiday 9	Pts: Lou Williams 21; Rebs: Capela, Collins 7 each Asts: Lou Williams 8
Series tied, 2–2

State Farm Arena, Atlanta, GA
Attendance: 16,478
Referees: James Capers, Josh Tiven, Tom Washington

The Bucks' 3-point woes returned in game 4, as the team only shot 21% (8–39) in a loss to Atlanta that evened the series once more. Even worse, the Bucks' superstar, Giannis Antetokounmpo, hyperextended his knee while trying to defend an alley-oop dunk, though an MRI the following day revealed no structural damage, and Antetokounmpo potentially available for either game 7 or the NBA Finals.

TNT

July 1
8:30pm (7:30pm CDT)

Recap

Atlanta Hawks 112, Milwaukee Bucks 123
Scoring by quarter: 22–36, 34–29, 22–26, 34–32
Pts: Bogdan Bogdanović 28; Rebs: Capela, Collins 8 each Asts: Kevin Huerter 7	Pts: Brook Lopez 33; Rebs: Khris Middleton 13; Asts: Jrue Holiday 13
Milwaukee leads series, 3–2

Fiserv Forum, Milwaukee, WI
Attendance: 16,389
Referees: David Guthrie, Tony Brothers, James Williams

With both teams' stars out with injuries, both the Hawks and Bucks needed contributions from their other players in game 5. The Bucks would deliver, led by Brook Lopez's 33 points. In addition to Lopez, 3 other Bucks starters (Khris Middleton, Jrue Holiday, and Bobby Portis) scored at least 20 points. While Atlanta kept the game close, aided by Bogdan Bogdanovic's 28 points, the Bucks took a 3–2 series lead, leaving them one win away from the Eastern Conference championship.

TNT

July 3
8:30pm

Recap

Milwaukee Bucks 118, Atlanta Hawks 107
Scoring by quarter: 28–24, 19–19, 44–29, 27–35
Pts: Khris Middleton 32; Rebs: Holiday, Portis 9 each Asts: Jrue Holiday 9	Pts: Cam Reddish 21; Rebs: John Collins 11; Asts: Trae Young 9
Milwaukee wins series, 4–2

State Farm Arena, Atlanta, GA
Attendance: 16,620
Referees: Zach Zarba, Eric Lewis, Sean Wright

Facing elimination, the Hawks got Trae Young back to start game 6, but he still struggled with his injured foot, scoring only 14 points. After leading Atlanta by only 4 points at halftime, Khris Middleton would score the Bucks' first 16 points of the 3rd quarter to build a 19-point lead going into the 4th quarter. The Bucks would weather a wave of hot shooting from Bogdan Bogdanovic and Cam Reddish, helped by a crucial 3-point shot by PJ Tucker, and an alley-oop dunk by Brook Lopez that essentially clinched the game and the series for the Bucks. The victory gave the Bucks the Eastern Conference championship, their 3rd overall conference title (though the previous two were for the Western Conference), and their first trip to the NBA Finals since 1974.

Game 6 was also the final game announced by famed basketball broadcaster Marv Albert.

Regular-season series
Milwaukee won 2–1 in the regular-season series

January 24, 2021

Recap

Atlanta Hawks 115, Milwaukee Bucks 129

Fiserv Forum, Milwaukee, WI

April 15, 2021

Recap

Milwaukee Bucks 120, Atlanta Hawks 109

State Farm Arena, Atlanta, GA

April 25, 2021

Recap

Milwaukee Bucks 104, Atlanta Hawks 111

State Farm Arena, Atlanta, GA

This was the fifth playoff meeting between these two teams, with each team winning two series apiece.

Previous playoffs series
Tied 2–2 in all-time playoff series

1984

Milwaukee Bucks 3, Atlanta Hawks 2

1984 Eastern Conference First Round

1988

Milwaukee Bucks 2, Atlanta Hawks 3

1988 Eastern Conference First Round

1989

Milwaukee Bucks 3, Atlanta Hawks 2

1989 Eastern Conference First Round

2010

Milwaukee Bucks 3, Atlanta Hawks 4

2010 Eastern Conference First Round

=== Western Conference finals ===
==== (2) Phoenix Suns vs. (4) Los Angeles Clippers ====
ABC

June 20
3:30pm (12:30pm MST)

Recap

Los Angeles Clippers 114, Phoenix Suns 120
Scoring by quarter: 21–21, 33–36, 39–36, 21–27
Pts: Paul George 34; Rebs: Nicolas Batum 10; Asts: Rajon Rondo 7	Pts: Devin Booker 40; Rebs: Devin Booker 13; Asts: Devin Booker 11
Phoenix leads series, 1–0

Phoenix Suns Arena, Phoenix, AZ
Attendance: 16,583
Referees: David Guthrie, Tony Brothers, Ben Taylor

ESPN

June 22
9:00pm (6:00pm MST)

Recap

Los Angeles Clippers 103, Phoenix Suns 104
Scoring by quarter: 22–25, 25–23, 24–27, 32–29
Pts: Paul George 26; Rebs: Ivica Zubac 11; Asts: Paul George 6	Pts: Cameron Payne 29; Rebs: Deandre Ayton 14; Asts: Cameron Payne 9
Phoenix leads series, 2–0

Phoenix Suns Arena, Phoenix, AZ
Attendance: 16,645
Referees: Scott Foster, Kane Fitzgerald, Curtis Blair

- Deandre Ayton dunked in the game-winning alley-oop off the inbound pass from Jae Crowder with 0.7 seconds remaining.

ESPN

June 24
9:00pm (6:00 pm PDT)

Recap

Phoenix Suns 92, Los Angeles Clippers 106
Scoring by quarter: 21–29, 27–17, 21–34, 23–26
Pts: Deandre Ayton 18; Rebs: Deandre Ayton 9 Asts: Chris Paul 12	Pts: Paul George 27; Rebs: Ivica Zubac 16; Asts: Paul George 8
Phoenix leads series, 2–1

Staples Center, Los Angeles, CA
Attendance: 17,222
Referees: Marc Davis, John Goble, James Williams

ESPN

June 26
9:00pm (6:00 pm PDT)

Recap

Phoenix Suns 84, Los Angeles Clippers 80
Scoring by quarter: 29–20, 21–16, 19–30, 15–14
Pts: Devin Booker 25; Rebs: Deandre Ayton 22; Asts: Chris Paul 7	Pts: Paul George 23; Rebs: Paul George 16; Asts: Paul George 6
Phoenix leads series, 3–1

Staples Center, Los Angeles, CA
Attendance: 18,222
Referees: Zach Zarba, Eric Lewis, Ken Mauer

The Clippers shot 0 of 12 in the fourth quarter on shots that could have tied the game or taken the lead. That is the most such attempts without a make in the fourth quarter of a game over the last 25 postseasons. During the last 8 seconds of the game when the Clippers trailed by 1 point, there was a controversial call where Nicolas Batum of the Clippers deflected the ball off the finger tips of Cameron Payne of the Suns, but the ball was given to the Suns. There was no review of the play despite a heavy plea from the Clippers.

ESPN

June 28
9:00pm (6:00pm MST)

Recap

Los Angeles Clippers 116, Phoenix Suns 102
Scoring by quarter: 36–26, 23–26, 32–26, 25–24
Pts: Paul George 41; Rebs: Paul George 13; Asts: Paul George 6	Pts: Devin Booker 31; Rebs: Deandre Ayton 11; Asts: Chris Paul 8
Phoenix leads series, 3–2

Phoenix Suns Arena, Phoenix, AZ
Attendance: 16,664
Referees: David Guthrie, Pat Fraher, Courtney Kirkland

ESPN

June 30
9:00pm (6:00 pm PDT)

Recap

Phoenix Suns 130, Los Angeles Clippers 103
Scoring by quarter: 33–29, 33–28, 31–26, 33–20
Pts: Chris Paul 41; Rebs: Deandre Ayton 17; Asts: Chris Paul 8	Pts: Marcus Morris 26; Rebs: George, Morris 9 each Asts: Reggie Jackson 8
Phoenix wins series, 4–2

Staples Center, Los Angeles, CA
Attendance: 18,495
Referees: Marc Davis, John Goble, Sean Wright

Chris Paul's 41 points matched his career high with that of his performance as a member of the Houston Rockets in Game 5 against the Utah Jazz in 2018, both of which were series clinchers. Paul previously played for the Clippers from 2011 to 2017. Patrick Beverley shoved Paul during a timeout, which led to an ejection, a flagrant foul, a technical foul and being suspended by the league president, former All-Star player and former head coach Kiki VanDeWeghe and current league commissioner Adam Silver for the first game of the 2021–22 season. This turned out to be the last game of Beverley's career with the Clippers before being traded away twice to the Memphis Grizzlies and the Minnesota Timberwolves. Beverley became the first player to be suspended for first game of the following season since Andrew Bynum in the 2011 NBA playoffs, for shoving and elbowing J. J. Barea during the Los Angeles Lakers' eventual four–game sweep by the eventual NBA champions, the Dallas Mavericks.

Regular-season series
LA Clippers won 2–1 in the regular-season series

January 3, 2021

Recap

Los Angeles Clippers 112, Phoenix Suns 107

Phoenix Suns Arena, Phoenix, AZ

April 8, 2021

Recap

Phoenix Suns 103, Los Angeles Clippers 113

Staples Center, Los Angeles, CA

April 28, 2021

Recap

Los Angeles Clippers 101, Phoenix Suns 109

Phoenix Suns Arena, Phoenix, AZ

This was the second playoff meeting between these two teams, with the Suns winning the previous meeting.

Previous playoffs series
Phoenix leads 1–0 in all-time playoff series

2006

Los Angeles Clippers 3, Phoenix Suns 4

2006 Western Conference semifinals

== NBA Finals: (W2) Phoenix Suns vs. (E3) Milwaukee Bucks ==
Note: Times are EDT (UTC−4) as listed by the NBA. If the venue is located in a different time zone, the local time is also given.

ABC

July 6
9:00pm (6:00pm MST)

Recap

Milwaukee Bucks 105, Phoenix Suns 118
Scoring by quarter: 26–30, 23–27, 27–35, 29–26
Pts: Khris Middleton 29; Rebs: Giannis Antetokounmpo 17; Asts: Jrue Holiday 9	Pts: Chris Paul 32; Rebs: Deandre Ayton 19; Asts: Chris Paul 9
Phoenix leads series, 1–0

Phoenix Suns Arena, Phoenix, AZ
Attendance: 16,557
Referees: Marc Davis, Josh Tiven, Pat Fraher

ABC

July 8
9:00pm (6:00pm MST)

Recap

Milwaukee Bucks 108, Phoenix Suns 118
Scoring by quarter: 29–26, 16–30, 33–32, 30–30
Pts: Giannis Antetokounmpo 42; Rebs: Giannis Antetokounmpo 12; Asts: Khris Middleton 8	Pts: Devin Booker 31; Rebs: Deandre Ayton 11; Asts: Chris Paul 8
Phoenix leads series, 2–0

Phoenix Suns Arena, Phoenix, AZ
Attendance: 16,583
Referees: Zach Zarba, Tony Brothers, Sean Wright

ABC

July 11
8:00pm (7:00pm CDT)

Recap

Phoenix Suns 100, Milwaukee Bucks 120
Scoring by quarter: 28–25, 17–35, 31–38, 24–22
Pts: Chris Paul 19; Rebs: Deandre Ayton 9 Asts: Chris Paul 9	Pts: Giannis Antetokounmpo 41; Rebs: Giannis Antetokounmpo 13; Asts: Jrue Holiday 9
Phoenix leads series, 2–1

Fiserv Forum, Milwaukee, WI
Attendance: 16,637
Referees: Scott Foster, Eric Lewis, James Williams

ABC

July 14
9:00pm (8:00pm CDT)

Recap

Phoenix Suns 103, Milwaukee Bucks 109
Scoring by quarter: 23–20, 29–32, 30–24, 21–33
Pts: Devin Booker 42; Rebs: Deandre Ayton 17; Asts: Chris Paul 7	Pts: Khris Middleton 40; Rebs: Giannis Antetokounmpo 14; Asts: Giannis Antetokounmpo 8
Series tied, 2–2

Fiserv Forum, Milwaukee, WI
Attendance: 16,911
Referees: James Capers, David Guthrie, Courtney Kirkland

ABC

July 17
9:00pm (6:00pm MST)

Recap

Milwaukee Bucks 123, Phoenix Suns 119
Scoring by quarter: 21–37, 43–24, 36–29, 23–29
Pts: Giannis Antetokounmpo 32; Rebs: Giannis Antetokounmpo 9 Asts: Jrue Holiday 13	Pts: Devin Booker 40; Rebs: Deandre Ayton 10; Asts: Chris Paul 11
Milwaukee leads series, 3–2

Footprint Center, Phoenix, AZ
Attendance: 16,562
Referees: Marc Davis, Josh Tiven, James Williams

ABC

July 20
9:00pm (8:00pm CDT)

Recap

Phoenix Suns 98, Milwaukee Bucks 105
Scoring by quarter: 16–29, 31–13, 30–35, 21–28
Pts: Chris Paul 26; Rebs: Jae Crowder 13; Asts: Booker, Paul 5 each	Pts: Giannis Antetokounmpo 50; Rebs: Giannis Antetokounmpo 14; Asts: Jrue Holiday 11
Milwaukee wins series, 4–2

Fiserv Forum, Milwaukee, WI
Attendance: 17,397
Referees: Scott Foster, Eric Lewis, Tony Brothers

Regular-season series
Phoenix won 2–0 in the regular-season series

February 10, 2021

Recap

Milwaukee Bucks 124, Phoenix Suns 125

Phoenix Suns Arena, Phoenix, AZ

April 19, 2021

Recap

Phoenix Suns 128, Milwaukee Bucks 127 (OT)

Fiserv Forum, Milwaukee, WI

This was the second playoff meeting between these two teams, with the Bucks winning the first meeting.

Previous playoffs series
Milwaukee leads 1–0 in all-time playoff series

1978

Milwaukee Bucks 2, Phoenix Suns 0

1978 Western Conference First Round

== Statistical leaders ==
Category	Game high			Average			
Category	Player	Team	High	Player	Team	Avg.	GP
Points	Damian Lillard	Portland Trail Blazers	55	Luka Dončić	Dallas Mavericks	35.7	7
Rebounds	Deandre Ayton	Phoenix Suns	22	Giannis Antetokounmpo	Milwaukee Bucks	12.8	21
Assists	James Harden; Trae Young	Brooklyn Nets; Atlanta Hawks	18	Russell Westbrook	Washington Wizards	11.8	5
Steals	Kyle Anderson	Memphis Grizzlies	6	Kyle Anderson	Memphis Grizzlies	2.8	5
Blocks	Robert Williams	Boston Celtics	9	Rudy Gobert	Utah Jazz	2.1	11

== Notable fan incidents ==
Throughout the playoffs, there were a number of incidents at multiple games involving fans:

- May 26: A fan spat at Trae Young during Game 2 of the Hawks–Knicks series at Madison Square Garden in New York City.
- May 26: A fan dumped popcorn on Russell Westbrook during Game 2 of the Wizards–76ers series at Wells Fargo Center in Philadelphia.
- May 26: Three fans were verbally disruptive towards the family of Ja Morant during Game 2 of the Grizzlies–Jazz series at Vivint Arena in Salt Lake City. There were also insensitive remarks made towards the family of Dillon Brooks.
- May 30: A fan threw a water bottle at Kyrie Irving following Game 4 of the Nets–Celtics series at TD Garden in Boston after the game.
- May 31: A fan ran onto the court during Game 4 of the 76ers–Wizards series at Capital One Arena in Washington, D.C.
- June 20: A fan threw a can onto the court in the closing seconds of Game 7 of the Hawks–76ers series in Philadelphia.

== Media coverage ==
=== Television ===
ESPN, ABC, TNT, and NBA TV broadcast the playoffs nationally in the United States. During the first two rounds, games were split by ESPN, ABC, and TNT. TNT primarily aired games on Saturday through Wednesday while ESPN does so on Friday and Saturday. For Thursday games, TNT had them in the first round and ESPN in the second round. ABC then aired selected games in the first two rounds on Friday through Sunday. NBA TV also televised selected games in the first round on Tuesday through Thursday. Regional sports networks affiliated with teams also broadcast the games, except for weekend games televised on ABC. (Note: Game 3 of the Celtics–Nets first round series aired nationally on ABC and co-existed with the teams' respective regional sports networks.) ESPN/ABC had exclusive coverage of the Western Conference finals while TNT had exclusive coverage of the Eastern Conference finals. ABC had exclusive coverage of the NBA Finals for the 19th straight year.

This was the final postseason for Marv Albert, who announced his retirement on May 17, 2021. Albert, who turned 80 in June, had spent most of the previous 31 years as the lead broadcaster for NBA coverage on TNT and NBC.
