= NBA 08 =

2007 basketball video game

- PlayStation 3 cover art
- Developers: San Diego Studio; A.C.R.O.N.Y.M. Games
- Publisher: Sony Computer Entertainment
- Platforms: PlayStation 2, PlayStation 3, PlayStation Portable
- Release: NA: September 25, 2007; AU: February 14, 2008 (PS2, PS3); EU: February 15, 2008 (PS3)
- Genres: Sports, simulation, arcade
- Modes: Single-player, multiplayer

NBA 08 is an NBA basketball video game developed by San Diego Studio and published by Sony Computer Entertainment. It was released on September 26, 2007 for PlayStation 3 and on October 12, 2007 for PlayStation Portable and PlayStation 2. The PlayStation 3 and PlayStation Portable versions were developed by San Diego Studio and the PlayStation 2 version was developed by A.C.R.O.N.Y.M. Games.

== Gameplay ==
In the main mode, a coach has had a rise in fame, but after last year's championship win, he announces he is retiring. It is up to the player to make his last year worthwhile.

== Reception ==
NBA 08

Aggregate score
Aggregator	Score		
Aggregator	PS2	PS3	PSP
Metacritic	59/100	63/100	75/100

Review scores
Publication	Score		
Publication	PS2	PS3	PSP
Eurogamer	N/A	7/10	N/A
Game Informer	N/A	7/10	N/A
GameSpot	6/10	5/10	6.5/10
GameSpy	3/5	3.5/5	4/5
GameZone	6/10	7.5/10	8.5/10
IGN	6/10	7.5/10	8.4/10
PlayStation Official Magazine – UK	N/A	5/10	N/A
PALGN	N/A	6/10	N/A
PlayStation: The Official Magazine	N/A	8/10	8.5/10
X-Play	N/A	2/5	N/A

The PSP version received "generally favorable reviews", while the PS2 and PS3 versions received "mixed" reviews, according to Metacritic.

Preceded by NBA 07	NBA 08	Succeeded by NBA 09: The Inside
