= NBA 06 =

2005 video game

- PlayStation 2 cover art featuring Amar'e Stoudemire
- Developer: San Diego Studio
- Publisher: Sony Computer Entertainment
- Platforms: PlayStation Portable; PlayStation 2
- Release: PlayStation Portable: NA: October 4, 2005; PlayStation 2: NA: November 1, 2005
- Genre: Sports
- Modes: Single-player, multiplayer

NBA 06 is a 2005 basketball video game developed by San Diego Studio and published by Sony Computer Entertainment for the PlayStation Portable and PlayStation 2. It is the first NBA video game published by Sony to have no involvement from 989 Sports.

== Gameplay ==
In The Life, the players take role of an NBA rookie. First, you must create your player and then go to pre-draft training camp of the team. After that the draft starts, and the character get picked. During the games, the player has to complete goals like scoring a certain number of points or holding their star to no steals. If there is a failure of at least one of the goals, the event will start all over again.

== Reception ==
NBA 06

Aggregate score
| Aggregator | Score | |
| Aggregator | PS2 | PSP |
|---|---|---|
| Metacritic | 63/100 | 72/100 |

Review scores
| Publication | Score | |
| Publication | PS2 | PSP |
|---|---|---|
| Game Informer | 7.75/10 | 6.5/10 |
| GamePro | 4/5 | 4/5 |
| GameSpot | 6.2/10 | 5.9/10 |
| GameSpy | 2/5 | 4/5 |
| GameZone | 6/10 | 7.9/10 |
| IGN | 6.9/10 | 7.5/10 |
| Official U.S. PlayStation Magazine | 3/5 | 3.5/5 |
| PlayStation: The Official Magazine | 7.5/10 | 6/10 |
| X-Play | 3/5 | N/A |

NBA 06 received "mixed or average reviews" on both platforms according to the review aggregation website Metacritic.
