= NBA 09: The Inside =

2008 basketball video game

- PlayStation 3 version's cover art
- Developers: San Diego Studio; A.C.R.O.N.Y.M. Games
- Publisher: Sony Computer Entertainment
- Platforms: PlayStation Portable, PlayStation 2, PlayStation 3
- Release: October 7, 2008
- Genres: Sports, Simulation, Arcade
- Modes: Single-player, Online

NBA 09: The Inside is a basketball simulation game developed by San Diego Studio and published by Sony Computer Entertainment. The game was released on October 7, 2008, for the PlayStation 3, PlayStation 2 and PlayStation Portable. The PlayStation 3 and PlayStation Portable versions of the game were developed by San Diego Studio, and the PlayStation 2 version of the game was developed by A.C.R.O.N.Y.M. Games. The game includes all 30 NBA teams along with 14 of the 16 NBDL teams.

== Gameplay ==
There are four game modes: Quick Play- this mode allows to choose an NBA or D-League team to play in a regular game, Franchise- choosing one NBA team and controlling its player transactions and as a General Manager, The Life- 3 different player stories of a rise from the D-League to the NBA, and NBA Replay- replaying a game played in real life.

== Reception ==
Reception

Aggregate score
Aggregator	Score		
Aggregator	PS2	PS3	PSP
Metacritic	45/100	63/100	79/100

Review scores
Publication	Score		
Publication	PS2	PS3	PSP
Game Informer	N/A	6.5/10	N/A
GameSpot	N/A	5/10	N/A
GameTrailers	N/A	7.2/10	N/A
GameZone	N/A	6.6/10	6/10
Hardcore Gamer	N/A	N/A	3.75/5
IGN	4.9/10	6.5/10	8.2/10
PlayStation: The Official Magazine	N/A	3.5/5	3.5/5

The PSP version received "generally favorable reviews", and the PS3 version received "mixed" reviews, while the PS2 version received "generally unfavorable reviews", according to Metacritic.
