= Massachusetts House of Representatives' 9th Norfolk district =

American legislative district

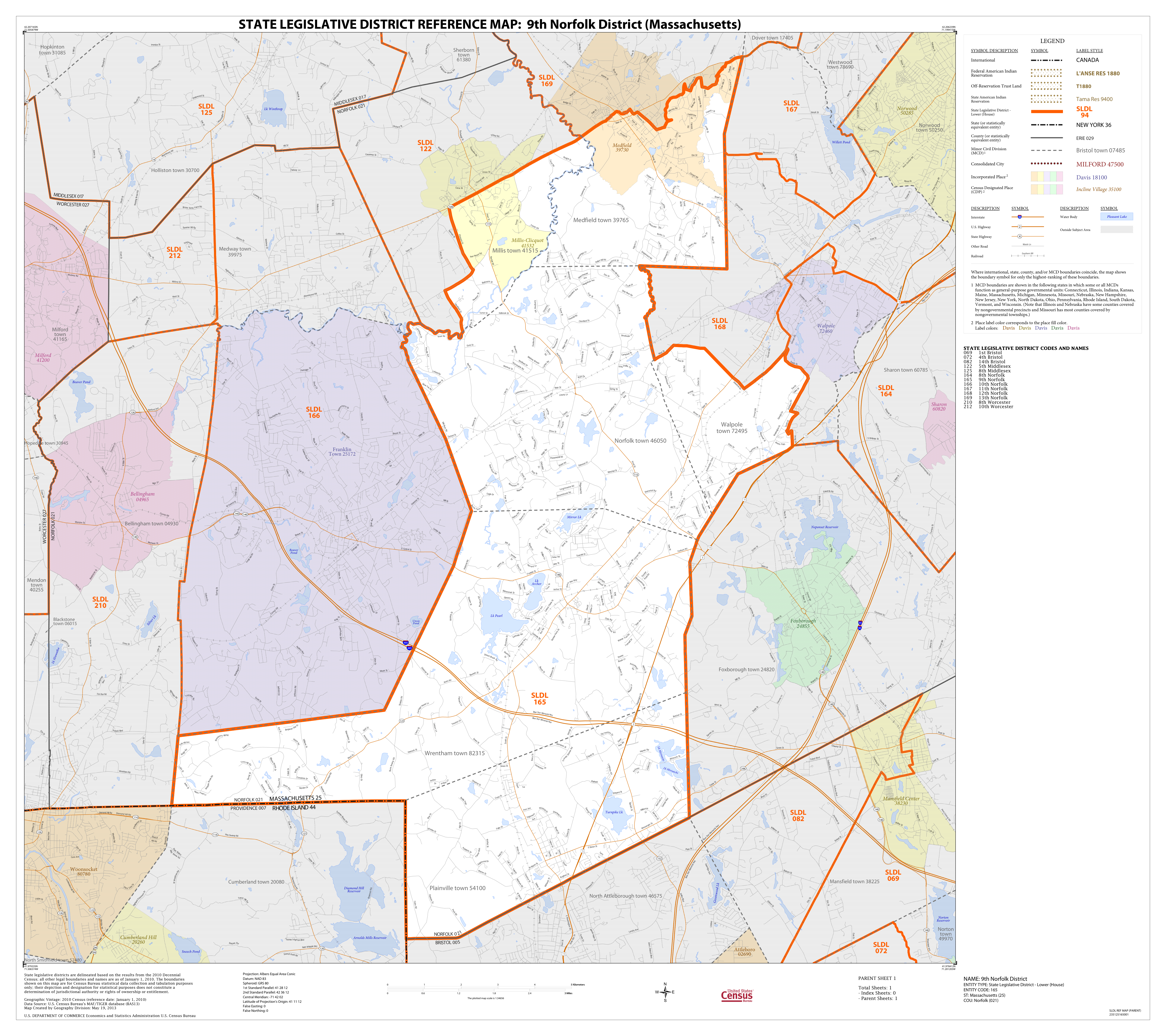
Map of Massachusetts House of Representatives' 9th Norfolk district, based on the 2010 United States census.

Massachusetts House of Representatives' 9th Norfolk district in the United States is one of 160 legislative districts included in the lower house of the Massachusetts General Court. It covers part of Norfolk County. Republican Shawn Dooley of Norfolk represented the district from 2014-2023. Now Marcus S. Vaughn, a Wrentham Republican, holds the seat.

== Towns represented ==
The district includes the following localities:

- part of Medfield
- part of Millis
- Norfolk
- Plainville
- part of Walpole
- Wrentham

The district geographic boundary overlapped with those of the Massachusetts Senate's Bristol and Norfolk district and Norfolk, Bristol and Middlesex district. After the 2022 redistricting much of the district is represented by the newly created Norfolk, Worcester, and Middlesex district.

=== Former locales ===
The district previously covered:

- Avon, circa 1927
- Holbrook, circa 1927
- Randolph, circa 1872, 1927

== Representatives ==
- Jonathan Wales, circa 1858
- Daniel Howard, circa 1859
- Albert E. Miller, circa 1888
- Elijah Baron Stowe, circa 1888
- Clarence F. Telford, circa 1951
- Edna Telford, 1955-1960
- M. Joseph Manning, 1975-1979
- Francis H. Woodward, 1979-1991
- Jo Ann Sprague, 1991-1999
- Scott P. Brown, 1999-2004
- Richard J. Ross, 2005-2011
- Daniel Winslow, 2011-2013
- Shawn C. Dooley, 2014-2023
- Marcus S. Vaughn, 2023–present

== Electoral history ==
The 9th Norfolk has been represented by the Republican Party since the 1992 General Election. A special general election was held on January 7, 2014 due to Daniel Winslow's (R) resignation on September 29, 2013, from the state house to join Rimini Street as senior vice president and general counsel.

=== 2022 ===
Candidate	Party	Votes	%
Marcus Vaughn	Republican Party	10,534	50.8
Kevin Kalkut	Democratic Party	10,174	49.1
Write-ins		12	0.1
Blank votes		582	–
Total		21,302	100

=== 2020 ===
Candidate	Party	Votes	%
Shawn Dooley	Republican Party	15,862	58.5
Brian Hamlin	Democratic Party	11,243	41.5
Write-ins		12	0
Blank votes		1,303	–
Total		28,420	100

=== 2018 ===
Candidate	Party	Votes	%
Shawn Dooley	Republican Party	12,029	58.7
Brian Hamlin	Democratic Party	8,437	41.2
Write-ins		14	0.1
Blank votes		671	–
Total		21,151	100

=== 2016 ===
Candidate	Party	Votes	%
Shawn Dooley	Republican Party	14,427	60.9
Brian Hamlin	Democratic Party	9,267	39.1
Write-ins		13	0.1
Blank votes		1,398	–
Total		25,105	100

=== 2014 general ===
Candidate	Party	Votes	%
Shawn Dooley	Republican Party	12,734	99.0
Write-ins		123	1
Blank votes		4,557	–
Total		17,414	100

=== 2014 special ===
Candidate	Party	Votes	%
Shawn Dooley	Republican Party	1,922	61.1
Christopher G. Timson	Unenrolled	659	20.9
Edward J. McCormick, III	Democratic Party	566	18.0
Write-ins		1	0
Blank votes		3	–
Total		3,151	100

=== 2012 ===
Candidate	Party	Votes	%
Daniel Winslow	Republican Party	18,091	99.1
Write-ins		158	0.9
Blank votes		5,283	–
Total		23,532	100

=== 2010 ===
Candidate	Party	Votes	%
Daniel Winslow	Republican Party	11,081	67.5
Stanley J. Nacewicz	Democratic Party	5,323	32.4
Write-ins		17	0.1
Blank votes		1,098	–
Total		17,519	100

=== 2008 ===
Candidate	Party	Votes	%
Richard J. Ross	Republican Party	12,688	61.3
Thomas Joseph Roache	Unenrolled	7,974	38.5
Write-ins		31	0.1
Blank votes		1,444	–
Total		22,137	100

=== 2006 ===
Candidate	Party	Votes	%
Richard J. Ross	Republican Party	12,564	99.1
Write-ins		118	0.9
Blank votes		3,728	–
Total		16,410	100

=== 2004 ===
Candidate	Party	Votes	%
Richard J. Ross	Republican Party	10,940	56.2
John J. McFeeley	Democratic Party	8,502	43.7
Write-ins		18	0.1
Blank votes		1,269	–
Total		20,729	100

=== 2002 ===
Candidate	Party	Votes	%
Scott Brown (politician)	Republican Party	11,956	99.4
Write-ins		78	0.6
Blank votes		3,645	–
Total		15,679	100

== See also ==
- List of Massachusetts House of Representatives elections
- Other Norfolk County districts of the Massachusetts House of Representatives: 1st, 2nd, 3rd, 4th, 5th, 6th, 7th, 8th, 10th, 11th, 12th, 13th, 14th, 15th
- List of Massachusetts General Courts
- List of former districts of the Massachusetts House of Representatives

== Images ==
Portraits of legislators

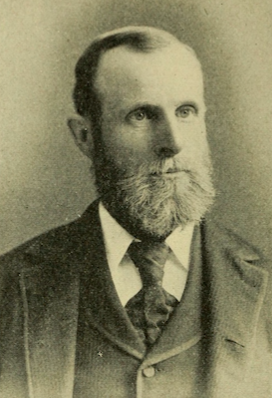
Edward Fuller

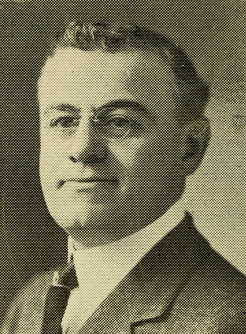
William Ollendorff

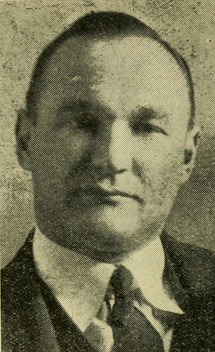
George Peirce

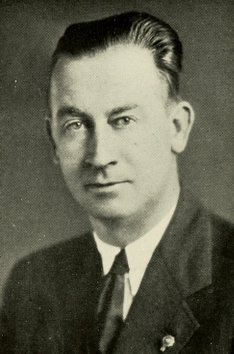
Martin Young

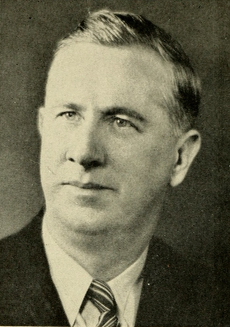
Clarence Telford

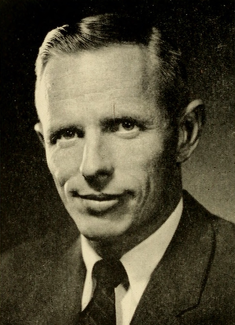
David Locke

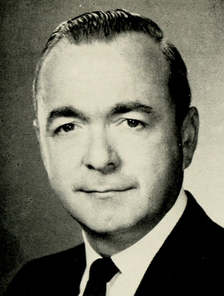
M. Joseph Manning

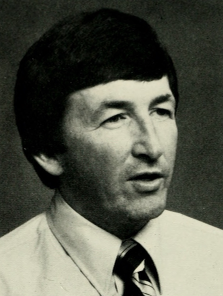
Francis Woodward

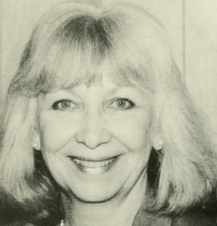
Jo Ann Sprague

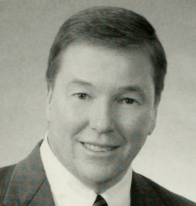
Richard Ross
