= Daniel Winslow =

American politician (born 1958)

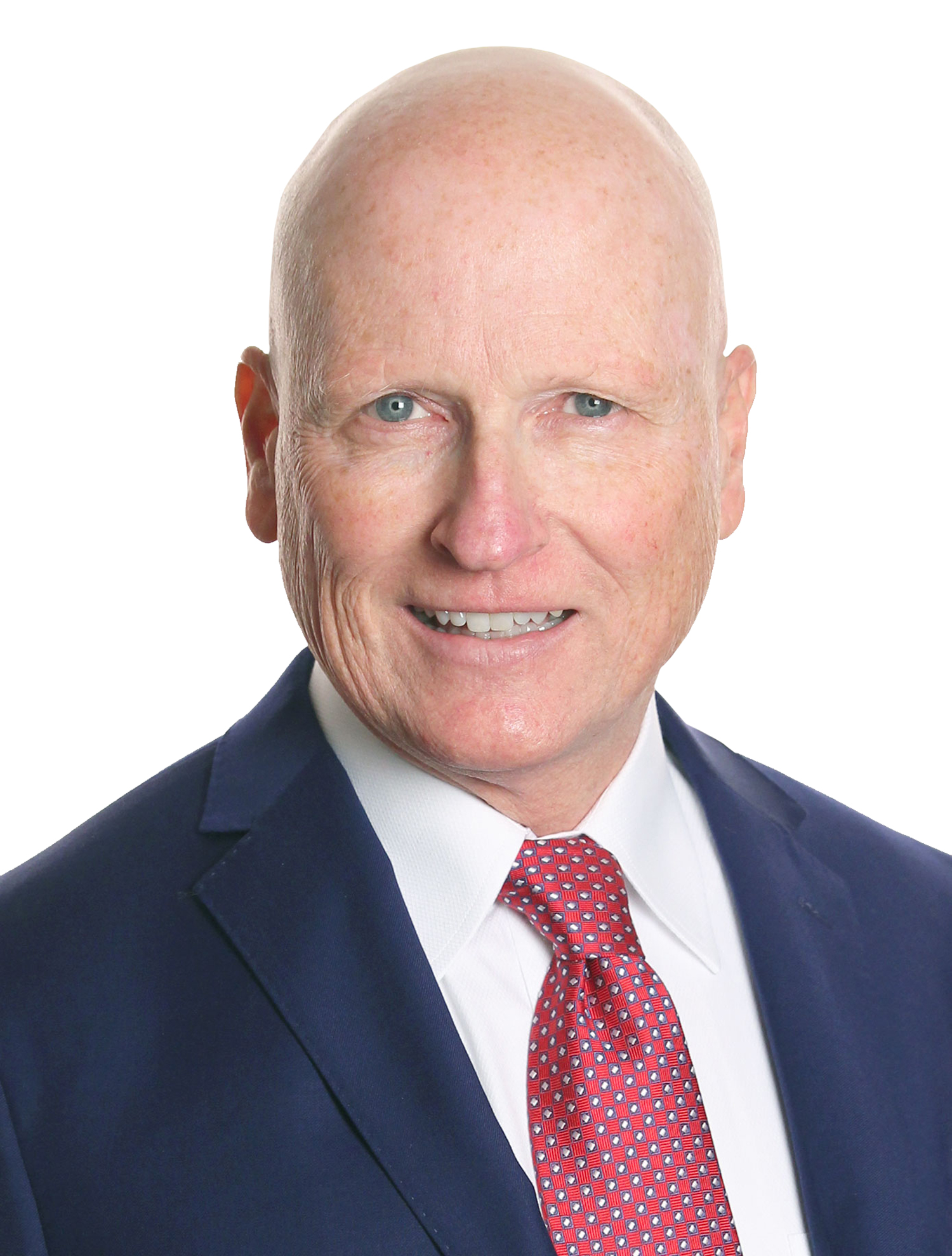

Member of the Massachusetts House of Representatives from the 9th Norfolk district
- In office January 5, 2011 – September 29, 2013
- Preceded by: Richard Ross
- Succeeded by: Shawn Dooley

Personal details
- Born: May 13, 1958 (age 68) Northampton, Massachusetts, U.S.
- Party: Republican
- Spouse: Susan Winslow
- Children: 3
- Education: Tufts University; Boston College Law School
- Website: Official website

Daniel B. Winslow (born May 13, 1958) is an American lawyer, Republican Party politician, and former Presiding Justice of the Wrentham District Court. He was the state Representative for the Ninth Norfolk district from January 2011 to September 2013.

Winslow served as Chief Legal Counsel to then-Massachusetts Governor Mitt Romney between 2002 and 2005 overseeing a team of more than 800 in-house and outside counsel. As an elected member to the Massachusetts House of Representatives, he served on the Joint Committee on the Judiciary, the House Ethics Committee, and the House Rules Committee, among other assignments.

Previously, he served eight years as a presiding justice and appellate division justice in the Massachusetts Trial Court. Winslow ran to be the Republican nominee in the special election to succeed Secretary of State John Kerry in the United States Senate, but lost the primary election.

Winslow stepped away from public life to serve as Senior Vice President and General Counsel of Rimini Street, Inc. (Nasdaq: RMNI) where he built and managed a global legal team of nearly 70 lawyers and legal professionals during the company’s transition from private to public company.

Dan Winslow was appointed to President of the New England Legal Foundation in October 2021 after serving as a law partner or counsel in small and large law firms, as Chief Legal Officer of a publicly traded software support company, and at a senior level in all three branches of state government.

Dan has been cited by Massachusetts Lawyers Weekly newspaper as one of the 35 most influential lawyers in Massachusetts in the past 35 years. He has an AV rating from Mardindale-Hubbell. Mr. Winslow is a member of the Association of Corporate Counsel, among several other organizations. He received his B.A. from Tufts University magna cum laude with special honors, and graduated from Boston College Law School cum laude.

== Education ==
Winslow received his bachelor's degree in political science from Tufts University and his J.D. from Boston College Law School. Winslow was a Senior Fellow at the Tufts University Tisch College of Citizenship and Public Service and a lecturer of government reform at Tufts University and Trial Advocacy at Boston College.

== Massachusetts House of Representatives ==
Winslow's campaign for State Representative focused on cutting taxes by cutting state spending, enhancing local core services, such as education, police, fire, public safety, and infrastructure, and using the Internet to improve government accountability and transparency. This seat was vacated by state Representative Richard J. Ross, who won the seat in the Massachusetts Senate that was vacated by Scott Brown upon his election to the United States Senate in January 2010. In reaction to the anti-bullying legislation being considered in Congress, Winslow has called on the House and Senate conference committee to adopt criminal penalties and to use Restorative Justice in the criminal system. He took office January 5, 2011. He resigned effective September 29, 2013 to join a software services provider as senior vice president and general counsel.

== Public service, associations, and honors ==
Winslow participated in local government for 15 years, including serving on the Norfolk Planning Board, Affordable Housing Committee, DPW Commission, Zoning Bylaw Study Committee, and Correctional Facilities Advisory Committee. As a member of the Planning Board, Winslow drafted "Smart Growth" zoning strategy including tradition New England Development, architectural design review, and creation of pedestrian and kid-friendly neighborhood streets that enhanced property value. Winslow is a member of the Massachusetts and Federal Bar Association, the American Judicature Society, and the International Institute for Conflict & Resolution (CPR). He was cited by Massachusetts Lawyers Weekly newspaper in 2007 as one of the 35 most influential lawyers in Massachusetts in the past 35 years and was recognized as a Super Lawyer in Massachusetts by Law and Politics magazine. He served as general counsel for Americans Elect, a group which unsuccessfully attempted to nominate a third party or independent candidate for president in 2012 and provide him or her with ballot access nationwide.
