= Richard J. Ross =

American politician in Massachusetts

Richard Ross
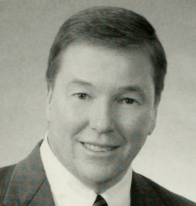

Member of the Massachusetts Senate from the Norfolk, Bristol, and Middlesex district
- In office 2010–2019
- Preceded by: Scott Brown
- Succeeded by: Becca Rausch

Member of the Massachusetts House of Representatives from the 9th Norfolk district
- In office 2005–2010
- Preceded by: Scott Brown
- Succeeded by: Daniel Winslow

Personal details
- Born: July 6, 1954 (age 72) Wrentham, Massachusetts
- Party: Republican
- Education: New England Institute of Anatomy
- Occupation: Minority Whip
- Website: Elect Richard J. Ross for State Senate

Richard J. Ross (born July 6, 1954) is a former Massachusetts State Senator for the former Norfolk, Bristol, and Middlesex district, which included parts of Attleboro, Franklin, Natick, and Wellesley, and all of North Attleboro, Ross's home town of Wrentham, Plainville, Norfolk, Millis, Sherborn, Wayland, and Needham. He is a Republican, and served as the Senate Minority Whip.

== Background ==
Ross grew up in Wrentham, Massachusetts. He attended American University. After the sudden death of his father, Ross returned to Massachusetts and assumed the family business, R. R. Ross Funeral Home, in Wrentham. Ross attended the New England Institute of Anatomy, Science & Embalming, and graduated with highest honor in 1975. Prior to serving in the Massachusetts legislature, he served on the Wrentham Board of Health and the Wrentham Board of Selectmen. He still resides in Wrentham, where he is the owner of R. J. Ross Funeral Home.

== Political offices ==
Ross has served in the state senate since May 2010, when he won a special election to succeed Scott Brown. This was the third time Ross was elected to a political office to succeed Brown. From 2005 to 2010, Ross was a member of the Massachusetts House of Representatives for the 9th Norfolk district.

In the general election of November 2018, Ross was defeated by Democratic challenger Becca Rausch by approximately a two percent margin.

=== S787 Controversy ===
In 2013, state senator Ross filed S787, which would restrict the dating and sex lives of people going through a divorce if they have children:

In divorce, separation, or 209A proceedings involving children and a marital home, the party remaining in the home shall not conduct a dating or sexual relationship within the home until a divorce is final and all financial and custody issues are resolved, unless the express permission is granted by the courts.

In Massachusetts, divorces are not finalized until 120 days after the final paperwork is signed. On March 24, 2014, Ross defended his submission of the bill in a Facebook post, "This was a free petition that I filed at the request of a constituent. I am not the sponsor of this legislation, nor have I ever endorsed or spoken in favor of it." The Massachusetts Executive Office of Administration and Finance defines a 'free petition' as: "In Massachusetts all citizens have the right to petition the state legislature. This procedure is called the right of free petition. A citizen drafts and files a Petition and accompanying Bill. A legislator sponsors the Bill in the General Court. If a legislator disagrees with the contents of the Bill, he/she may indicate this by placing the phrase 'By request' after his/her name." The text of S787 specifies that it was filed by "Richard J. Ross, (BY REQUEST)".

== Committees ==
•Joint Committee on Rules

•Joint Committee on Economic Development and Emerging Technologies

•Joint Committee on Education

•Joint Committee on Higher Education

•Joint Committee on the Judiciary

•Joint Committee on Mental Health and Substance Abuse

•Joint Committee on Municipalities and Regional Government

•Joint Committee on Public Safety and Homeland Security

•Joint Committee on Ways and Means

•Senate Committee on Ethics and Rules

•Senate Committee on Ways and Means

Massachusetts Senate
Preceded by Scott Brown	Member of the Massachusetts Senate for the Norfolk, Bristol & Middlesex district 2010–2019	Succeeded by Rebecca L. Rausch
Massachusetts House of Representatives
