= Massachusetts Senate's Norfolk, Worcester and Middlesex district =

American legislative district

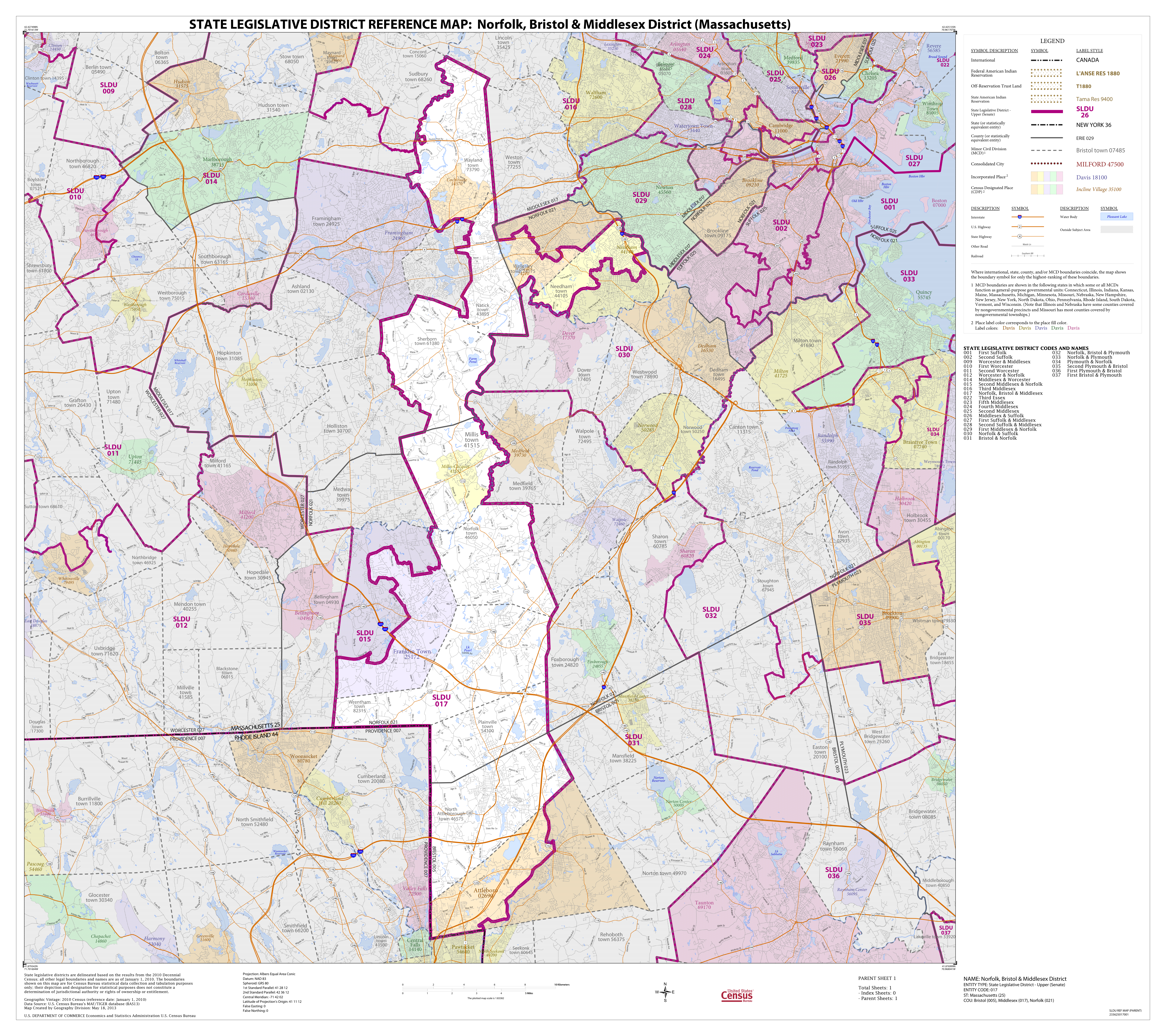
Map of Massachusetts Senate's Norfolk, Bristol and Middlesex district, based on the 2010 United States census.

Massachusetts Senate's Norfolk, Worcester and Middlesex district, formerly Massachusetts Senate's Norfolk, Bristol and Middlesex district, in the United States is one of 40 legislative districts of the Massachusetts Senate. Prior to redistricting that took effect with the 2022 elections, the district covered 8.6% of Bristol County, 2.0% of Middlesex County, and 12.4% of Norfolk County population. Democrat Becca Rausch of Needham has represented the district since 2019.

== Towns represented ==
The current Norfolk, Worcester, and Middlesex district represents the following:

- Bellingham
- Dover
- Franklin
- Medfield
- Milford
- Millis
- Needham
- Norfolk
- Sherborn
- Plainville
- Wrentham

The pre-2023 district included the following localities:

- Attleboro
- Franklin
- Millis
- Natick
- Needham
- Norfolk
- North Attleborough
- Plainville
- Sherborn
- Wayland
- Wellesley
- Wrentham

== Senators ==
- David Henry Locke, 1969-1993
- Cheryl Jacques, 1993-2004
- Scott Brown, Mar. 25, 2004-Feb. 4, 2010
- Richard J. Ross, 2010-2019
- Becca Rausch, 2019-current

== Electoral history ==
The state senate district has been held by a Democrat since 2019. Prior to the election of Senator Rausch, it was held by Republicans since 2004.

=== Norfolk, Worcester and Middlesex elections ===
==== 2022 ====
Candidate	Party	Votes	%
Becca Rausch	Democratic Party	41,893	54.8
Shawn Dooley	Republican Party	34,452	45.1
Write-ins		53	0.1
Blank votes		1,950	–
Total		78,348	100

=== Norfolk, Bristol and Middlesex elections ===
==== 2020 ====
Candidate	Party	Votes	%
Becca Rausch	Democratic Party	58,320	59.7
Matthew T. Kelly	Republican Party	39,290	40.2
Write-ins		80	0.1
Blank votes		5,696	–
Total		103,386	100

==== 2018 ====
Candidate	Party	Votes	%
Becca Rausch	Democratic Party	37,830	51.2
Richard J. Ross	Republican Party	35,856	48.6
Write-ins		141	0.2
Blank votes		3,378	–
Total		77,205	100

==== 2016 ====
Candidate	Party	Votes	%
Richard J. Ross	Republican Party	49,776	60.0
Kristopher K. Aleksov	Democratic Party	35,856	39.9
Write-ins		95	0.1
Blank votes		9,626	–
Total		92,580	100

==== 2014 ====
Candidate	Party	Votes	%
Richard J. Ross	Republican Party	34,952	61.0
Dylan Hayre	Democratic Party	22,267	38.9
Write-ins		52	0.1
Blank votes		4,723	–
Total		61,994	100

==== 2012 ====
Candidate	Party	Votes	%
Richard J. Ross	Republican Party	60,885	98.9
Write-ins		669	1.1
Blank votes		26,133	–
Total		87,687	100

==== 2010 general ====
Candidate	Party	Votes	%
Richard J. Ross	Republican Party	48,824	98.7
Write-ins		664	1.3
Blank votes		20,995	–
Total		70,483	100

==== 2010 special ====
Candidate	Party	Votes	%
Richard J. Ross	Republican Party	15,902	61.6
Peter B. Smulowitz	Democratic Party	9,283	38.0
Write-ins		100	0.1
Blank votes		110	–
Total		25,935	100

==== 2008 ====
Candidate	Party	Votes	%
Scott P. Brown	Republican Party	49,795	58.5
Sara Orozco	Democratic Party	35,289	41.4
Write-ins		81	0.1
Blank votes		5,821	–
Total		90,986	100

==== 2006 ====
Candidate	Party	Votes	%
Scott P. Brown	Republican Party	46,972	98.1
Write-ins		916	1.9
Blank votes		19,476	–
Total		67,364	100

== Images ==
Portraits of legislators

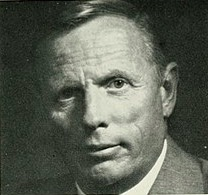
David Henry Locke

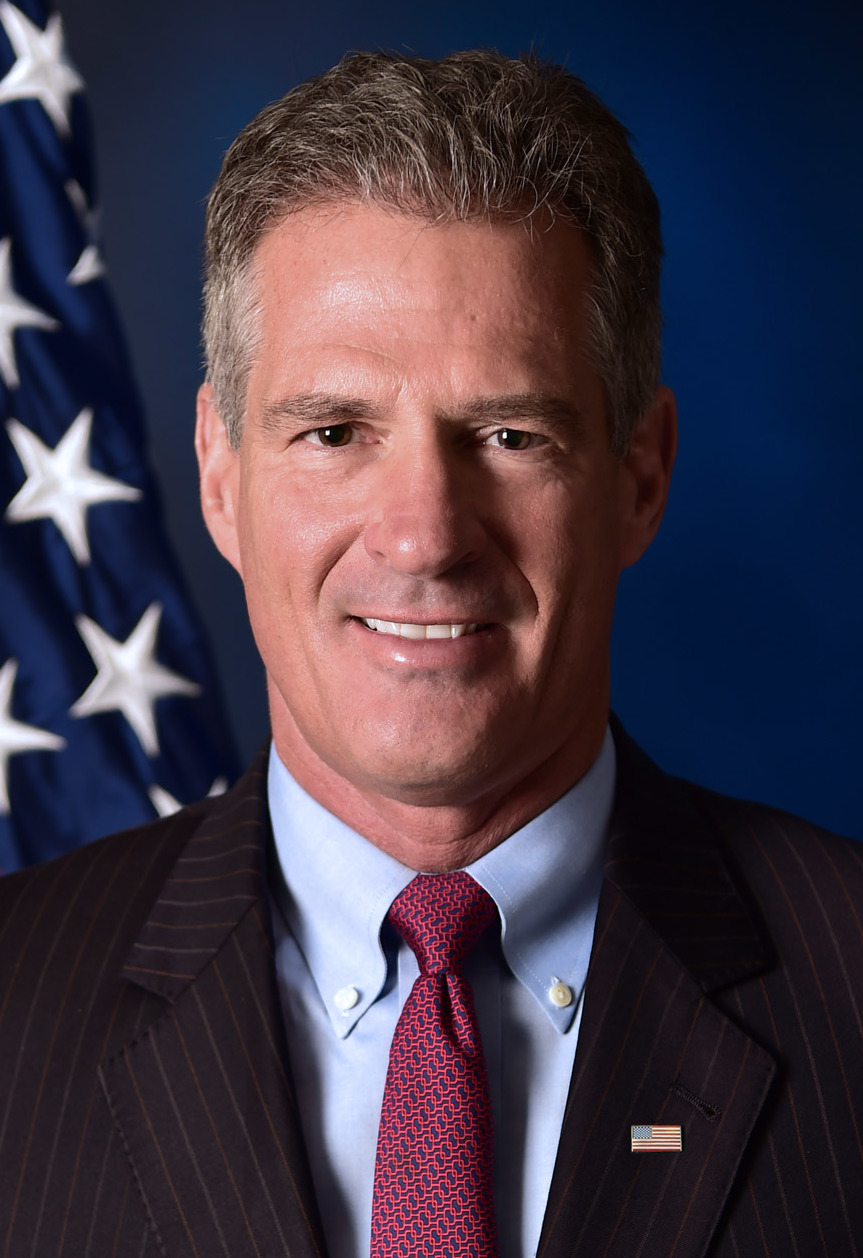
Scott Brown

== See also ==
- List of Massachusetts Senate elections
- List of Massachusetts General Courts
- List of former districts of the Massachusetts Senate
- Bristol County districts of the Massachusetts House of Representatives: 1st, 2nd, 3rd, 4th, 5th, 6th, 7th, 8th, 9th, 10th, 11th, 12th, 13th, 14th
- Middlesex County districts of the Massachusetts House of Representatives: 1st, 2nd, 3rd, 4th, 5th, 6th, 7th, 8th, 9th, 10th, 11th, 12th, 13th, 14th, 15th, 16th, 17th, 18th, 19th, 20th, 21st, 22nd, 23rd, 24th, 25th, 26th, 27th, 28th, 29th, 30th, 31st, 32nd, 33rd, 34th, 35th, 36th, 37th
- Norfolk County districts of the Massachusetts House of Representatives: 1st, 2nd, 3rd, 4th, 5th, 6th, 7th, 8th, 9th, 10th, 11th, 12th, 13th, 14th, 15th
