= Shawn Dooley =

American politician

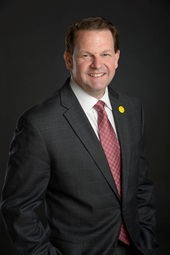

Member of the Massachusetts House of Representatives from the 9th Norfolk district
- In office January 29, 2014 – December 27, 2022
- Preceded by: Daniel Winslow
- Succeeded by: Marcus Vaughn

Personal details
- Born: Shawn Clifford Dooley
- Party: Republican
- Spouse: Carolyn "Cici" Van Tine
- Children: 4
- Education: Auburn University; Anna Maria College

Shawn C. Dooley is an American politician from the Commonwealth of Massachusetts. He was a member of the Massachusetts House of Representatives in the 9th Norfolk district, succeeding Dan Winslow. The 9th Norfolk District constitutes all or parts of the Towns of Medfield, Millis, Norfolk, Plainville, Walpole, and Wrentham. A member of the Republican Party, he was sworn in January 29, 2014. In 2022, he vacated the seat to run for the Massachusetts State Senate, he was defeated by incumbent Becca Rausch.

== Personal life ==
Dooley received his bachelor's degree from Auburn University, and a master's degree from Anna Maria College. He is married to Family Law Attorney Carolyn (CiCi) Van Tine and they have four children.

== Political career ==
Prior to his election to the state house, he served as the elected Norfolk Town Clerk as well as the Chairman of the Norfolk School Committee.

Dooley was elected to the Norfolk School Committee at the May 11th, 2010 town election. That year he was also appointed to the town's zoning board of appeals by the select board. In 2011 he elected as Norfolk's town clerk and was appointed to Norfolk's Board of Health and the School Building Committee. According to Norfolk's 2011 Annual Report, Shawn Dooley was also appointed a Justice of the Peace by Governor Deval Patrick and performed numerous marriage ceremonies in 2012, many of which were held at the gazebo on Town Hill. On Tuesday, April 30, 2013 he was reelected to the Norfolk School Committee. Upon his election to the state house, Dooley resigned his school committee seat.

Dooley made national headlines for his bill on preventing Chinese owned and other non-market economy nations from participating in the state bid process for critical infrastructure such as rail. The impetus of this bill was when China's government owned CRRC gained the Massachusetts Bay Transit Authority contract for manufacturing orange lines cars. His original opinion piece sparked national coverage including Bloomberg, NPR, Washington Post and NBC radio. Similar bills were filed in both the U.S. House and Senate and passed in a bipartisan fashion.

In August 2020, the conservative website New Boston Post published an excerpt from Representative Dooley’s nightly Facebook post on the pandemic criticizing Massachusetts Governor Charlie Baker and calling him "King Charles" for implementing COVID-19 restrictions without consulting the legislature and issuing numerous executive orders under the guise of a state of emergency, after a spike of cases rose in Massachusetts.

On January 3, 2021, Dooley challenged Trump supporter Jim Lyons for the Chairmanship of the Massachusetts Republican Party in an effort to "capture that middle ground as opposed to going far hard-right". Dooley lost to Lyons with a vote of the Republican State Committee 39-36.

In 2022, Dooley ran for the Massachusetts State Senate. He was defeated by incumbent Democrat Becca Rausch, 55-45.

== Post State House Career ==
Rep. Dooley resigned from his seat on December 27, 2022 at 5:00pm, a week before his term was set to expire. Following the resignation, outgoing Governor Charlie Baker appointed Dooley to the position of Commissioner of the Massachusetts Civil Service Commission.

== Electoral history ==
Massachusetts Norfolk, Worcester, and Middlesex General Election, 2022
Party	Candidate	Votes	%
Democratic	Becca Rausch	41,893	54.8
Republican	Shawn C. Dooley	34,452	45.1
Write-in		53	0.1
Total votes		76,398	100.0

Massachusetts 9th Norfolk General Election, 2020
Party	Candidate	Votes	%
Republican	Shawn C. Dooley	15,862	58.5
Democratic	Brian P. Hamlin	11,243	41.5
Write-in		12	0
Total votes		27,117	100.0

Massachusetts Norfolk, Bristol and Middlesex Republican Party State Committee Man, 2020
Party	Candidate	Votes	%
Republican	Shawn C. Dooley	5,389	64.3
Republican	Earl H. Sholley	2,976	35.5
Write-in		19	0.2
Total votes		8,384	100.0

Massachusetts 9th Norfolk General Election, 2018
Party	Candidate	Votes	%
Republican	Shawn C. Dooley	12,029	58.7
Democratic	Brian P. Hamlin	8,437	41.2
Write-in		14	0.1
Total votes		20,480	100.0

Massachusetts 9th Norfolk General Election, 2016
Party	Candidate	Votes	%
Republican	Shawn C. Dooley	14,427	60.9
Democratic	Brian P. Hamlin	9,267	39.1
Write-in		13	0.1
Total votes		23,707	100.0

Dooley faced no opposition in the 2014 General Election.

Massachusetts 9th Norfolk Special General Election, 2014
Party	Candidate	Votes	%
Republican	Shawn C. Dooley	1,922	61.1
Independent	Christopher G. Timson	659	20.9
Democratic	Edward J. McCormick, III	566	18.0
Write-in		13	0.1
Total votes		23,707	100.0

Massachusetts 9th Norfolk Special Republican Primary, 2013
Party	Candidate	Votes	%
Republican	Shawn C. Dooley	111	100
Total votes		111	100.0

=== 2013 Annual Town Election, Norfolk School Committee For Three Years ===
Candidate	Votes	%
Shawn Dooley	1,101	98.3
Write-ins	19	1.7
Blank votes	452	–
Total	1,527	100

=== 2011 Annual Town Election, Norfolk Town Clerk For Three Years ===
Candidate	Votes	%
Shawn Dooley	656	53.4
Gail Bernardo	571	46.5
Write-ins	1	0.1
Blank votes	7	–
Total	1,235	100

=== 2010 Annual Town Election, Norfolk School Committee For Three Years ===
Candidate	Votes	%
Shawn Dooley	1,132	99.0
Write-ins	11	0.96
Blank votes	726	–
Total	1,869	100

== See also ==
- 2019–2020 Massachusetts legislature
- 2021–2022 Massachusetts legislature
