= King Philip Regional School District =

School district in Massachusetts, United States

Address
- 18 King Street Norfolk, Massachusetts, 02056; United States

District information
- Type: Public
- Grades: 7–12
- Superintendent: Dr. Rich Drolet
- NCES District ID: 2506510

Students and staff
- Enrollment: 1,849 (2023-2024)
- Faculty: 141.14 (on an FTE basis)
- Student–teacher ratio: 13.10
- District mascot: Warrior
- Colors: Green and Gold

Other information
- Website: www.kingphilip.org

King Philip Regional School District is a school district headquartered in Norfolk, Massachusetts. Its territory includes Norfolk, Plainville, and Wrentham.

== School Committee ==
The King Philip Regional School District is in part governed by the King Philip Regional School District Committee.

=== Members ===
Name	Town	Term	Positions
Bruce Cates	Plainville	2021-2024	Vice Chair
Christopher Brenneis	Plainville	2023-2024	Plainville School Committee Representative
Jennifer Wynn	Norfolk	2022-2024	Norfolk School Committee Representative
Erin Greaney	Wrentham	2022-2023	Wrentham School Committee Representative
Jim Lehan	Norfolk	2020-2023	
Eric Harmon	Norfolk	2021-2024	
Marc Waxman	Wrentham	2021-2024	
Greg Wehmeyer	Plainville	2023-2026	
Joseph Cronin IV	Wrentham	2023-2026	

== Schools ==
- King Philip Regional High School - Wrentham
- King Philip Regional Middle School - Norfolk
