= King Philip Regional High School =

Location
- 201 Franklin Street; Wrentham, Massachusetts 02093; United States; 42°04′22.61″N 71°19′56.45″W

Information
- Type: Public
- Established: 1957 (69 years ago)
- School district: King Philip Regional School District
- Principal: Nicole Bottomley
- Faculty: 82.45 (FTE)
- Enrollment: 1,114 (2024–2025)
- Student to teacher ratio: 13.51
- Campus: Suburban
- Colors: Green & Gold
- Athletics conference: Hockomock League
- Mascot: Warrior
- Rival: Franklin High School
- Communities served: Wrentham, Norfolk, Plainville
- SAT (2017–2018): 580 verbal; 574 math
- Website: www.kingphilip.org/high-school/

King Philip Regional High School (KPRHS) is a regional high school in Wrentham, Massachusetts, United States. It is a part of the King Philip Regional School District, drawing students from three towns: Wrentham, Norfolk, and Plainville.

== Marching band ==
The King Philip Regional High School Marching Band, known as "The Pride and The Passion", has traveled throughout New England and the United States for state, regional, and national competitions including Massachusetts Instrumental and Choral Conductors Association (MICCA) marching band festivals, New England Scholastic Band Association competitions, USBands national competitions, and Bands of America Grand National competitions.

Awards and titles won by the King Philip Marching Band include:

- 21 consecutive (32 total) MICCA Finals Gold Medal awards (1986—2006 2008—2019)
- USBands Group 2 Open Class National Champions (1995)
- USBands Group 3 Open Class National Champions (1998, 1999, 2013, 2015, 2016, 2024)
- USBands Group 4 Open Class National Champions (2009, 2012)

== Notable alumni and faculty ==
- Emory Rounds. Attorney and government ethics official. In 2018, he was appointed director of the United States Office of Government Ethics.
- David G. Binney, 1940 - 2008. Former deputy director of the FBI.
- Joe Johnson, b. 1961. Former pitcher in Major League Baseball.
- Jeff Plympton, b. 1965. Former pitcher in Major League Baseball.
- Liam Kyle Sullivan, b. 1973. Comedian, cross dresser, singer, and YouTuber.
- Jeremy Udden, b. 1978. Jazz musician. As of 2009, he was in a band called Plainville.
- Lofa Tatupu, b. 1982. Former linebacker in the National Football League.
- Evan McGill, b. 1983. Three-Time Tony Award–Winning Producer
- Jake Layman, b. 1994. Former player in the National Basketball Association.
- Michelle Carter, b. 1996. Convicted of involuntary manslaughter for encouraging her then boyfriend, Conrad Roy, to kill himself. See Death of Conrad Roy.
