= Charlotte W. Hawes =

American composer, music educator, lecturer, critic

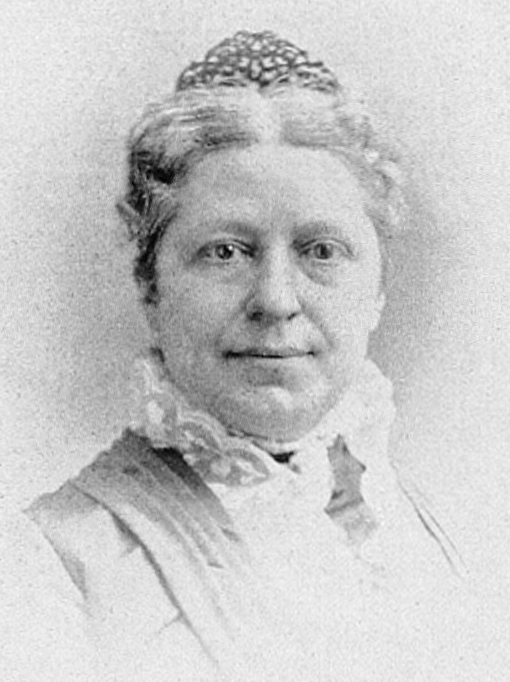
Charlotte White Hawes

Charlotte White Hawes (7 February 1840 – 5 September 1926) was an American composer, lecturer, music educator, poet and critic from Massachusetts. "God Bless the Soldier", written in 1890, was dedicated to the Grand Army of the Republic.

== Early years and education ==
Born in Wrentham, Massachusetts, she was of Puritan ancestry, her ancestors on the father's side having settled in Massachusetts in 1635. A large part of her early education was received in at home. She was the oldest daughter of a large family and became a close companion of her father, from whom she inherited her musical talent. She had her preliminary musical training in Boston and New York City, continuing her studies in Germany, in Berlin and Dresden, under the' direction of Friedrich Wieck. During her stay in Dresden she formed the acquaintance of many eminent musicians, among them the most notable being Franz Liszt. In 1877, she returned to Boston, where she made her home.

== Career ==
She was notables as a composer of music, a musical lecturer and critic, and a teacher of music. She was well versed in the literature of music. One of her popular achievements in the double role of composer and poet was, "God Bless the Soldier", written for the National Encampment in Boston in August, 1890, and dedicated to the Grand Army of the Republic. During the week of the encampment, it was often played by the bands in the processions. Other popular songs by Hawes were "Cradle Song," "Greeting", and "Nannie's Sailor Lad", as well as "God shall be magnified" and "The song of the world". She filled engagements as a musical lecturer throughout the US. In 1878, she was publicly invited by a number of Bostonians to repeat a lecture series consisting of "Nature's Music", "National Music, Hymns and Ballads", "The Influence of Music", and "Liszt." She also lectured on Hungarian music, Hebrew music, Scandinavian music, Easter music, carols, bells, and cradle songs. Hawes taught piano-forte and harmony, was a prolific and successful composer, a poet, and a critic. Never married, Hawes died in 1926 in Boston.

Hawes was a frequent contributor of critical and biographical sketches to musical publications. She was the editor of "Famous Themes of Great Composers", which was published in four editions. It featured reproductions in facsimile of "I know that my Redeemer liveth" (Handel); "Sonata, Op. 26," (Beethoven); "Prelude, Ave Maria," (J. S. Bach); "Song," (Mozart); "Erl King," (Franz Schubert); and a "Song without Words," (Mendelssohn). The third edition added "Prelude" (Chopin), "Invitation to the Waltz," (Von Weber); "Scherzino," (Robert Schumann); theme from "Overture to Tannhauser," (Richard Wagner) and Franz Liszt, with each composer's autograph attached.

== Bibliography ==
- Clapp, D. (1908). The Descendants of George Holmes of Roxbury: 1594–1908 (Public domain ed.). Press of D. Clapp & son.
- Hames, E. H. (1889). The Literary World. Vol. XX (Public domain ed.). Boston: S. R. Crocker.
- Hawes, R. G. (1996). The Edward Hawes heirs: Edward Hawes, ca. 1616–1687, of Dedham, Massachusetts, and his wife, Eliony Lumber, and some of their descendants through eleven generations. Gateway Press.
- Sutro, Florence Edith Clinton (1895). Women in Music and Law (Public domain ed.). New York: Author's Publishing Company.
- Willard, Frances Elizabeth; Livermore, Mary Ashton Rice (1897). American Women: Fifteen Hundred Biographies with Over 1,400 Portraits : a Comprehensive Encyclopedia of the Lives and Achievements of American Women During the Nineteenth Century (Public domain ed.). Mast, Crowell & Kirkpatrick. p. 363.
- Wilson, G. H. (1889). The Musical Year-book of the United States. Vol. 6. G.H. Wilson.
