= Marcus Vaughn =

American politician

Marcus S. Vaughn
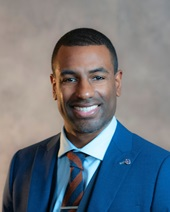

Member of the Massachusetts House of Representatives from the 9th Norfolk district
- Incumbent
- Assumed office 2023
- Preceded by: Shawn Dooley

Personal details
- Born: 4 December 1985 (age 40) Boston, MA
- Party: Republican
- Spouse: Married
- Children: 3
- Education: Syracuse University (BA); California State University, Monterey Bay (MBA)
- Alma mater: North Attleborough High School
- Occupation: VP of Sales

Marcus S. Vaughn (born in North Attleboro, Massachusetts) is an American politician serving as a member of the Massachusetts House of Representatives for the 9th Norfolk district since 2023.

== Early life and education ==
Vaughn attended North Attleborough High School. He participated actively in the school's football, basketball, and track and field programs. As a student he was a member of SADD and served as a volunteer middle school track coach. Marcus, a first generation college student, later attended Syracuse University on a full athletic scholarship. He then went to California State University, Monterey Bay from 2012 to 2014, and earned a Master of Business Administration in international business with a GPA of 3.62.

In his professional career, Vaughn has worked for Dycem Ltd., Brady Corporation, and most recently REP Marketing Solutions.

== Massachusetts House of Representatives ==
Vaughn was elected to the State House in 2022, defeating Democratic Norfolk Select Board member Kevin Kalkut in the 2022 General Election.

Rep. Vaughn serves as the ranking minority on the House Committee on Operations, Facilities and Security and a member on the Joint Committee on Public Safety and Homeland Security.

== Electoral history ==
2022 9th Norfolk General Election
Party	Candidate	Votes	%
Republican	Marcus S. Vaughn	10,534	50.8
Democratic	Kevin Kalkut	10,174	49.1
Total votes		21,302	100.0

== See also ==
- 2023–2024 Massachusetts legislature
