= Scott Brown (politician) =

American diplomat and politician (born 1959)

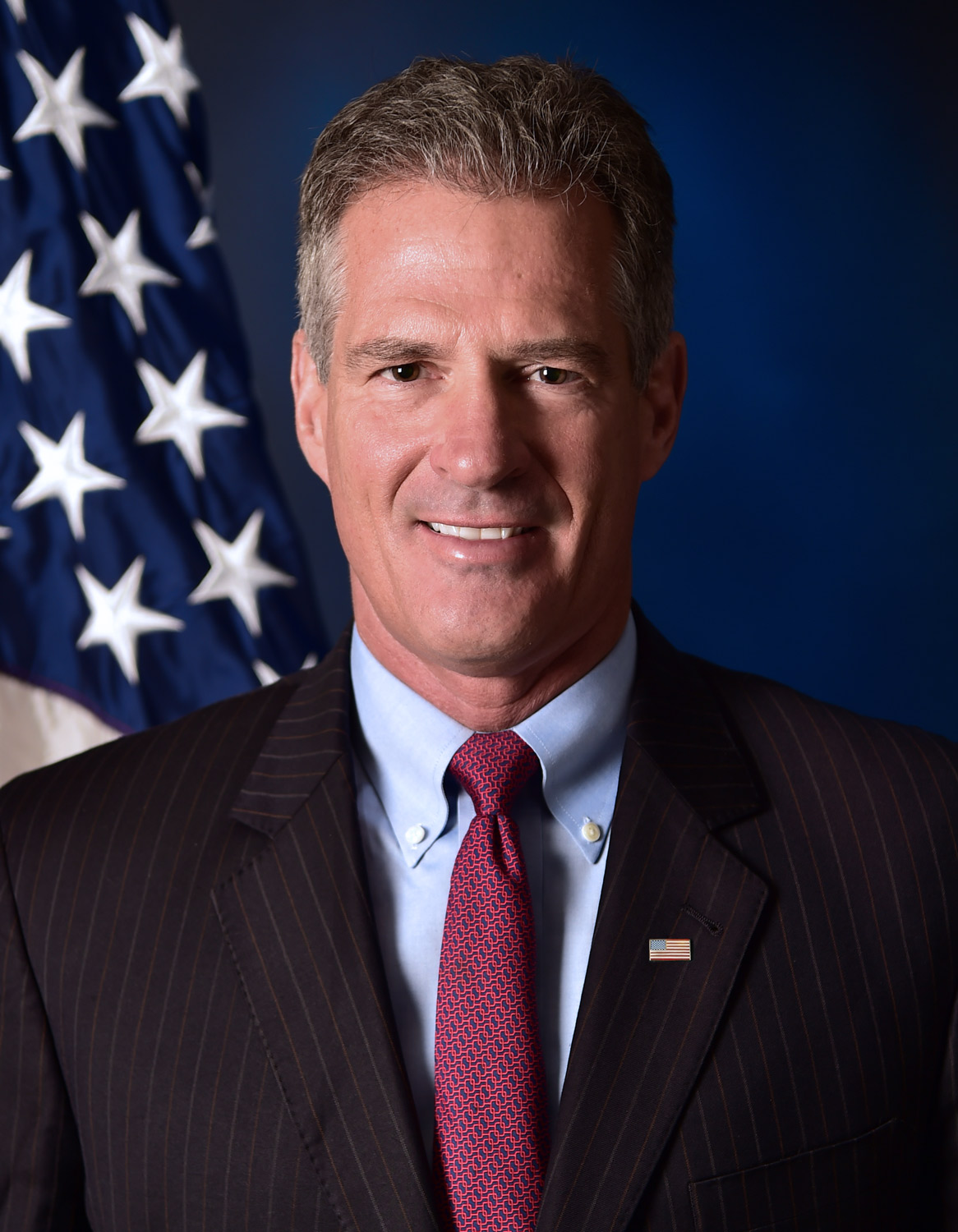
- Official portrait, 2017

Dean of New England Law Boston
- In office January 1, 2021 – August 11, 2021
- Preceded by: John O'Brien
- Succeeded by: Lisa Freudenheim

United States Ambassador to New Zealand
- In office June 28, 2017 – December 20, 2020
- President: Donald Trump
- Preceded by: Mark Gilbert
- Succeeded by: Tom Udall

United States Ambassador to Samoa
- In office July 27, 2017 – December 20, 2020
- President: Donald Trump
- Preceded by: Mark Gilbert
- Succeeded by: Tom Udall

United States Senator from Massachusetts
- In office February 4, 2010 – January 3, 2013
- Preceded by: Paul G. Kirk
- Succeeded by: Elizabeth Warren

Member of the Massachusetts Senate from the Norfolk, Bristol, and Middlesex district
- In office March 25, 2004 – February 4, 2010
- Preceded by: Cheryl Jacques
- Succeeded by: Richard Ross

Member of the Massachusetts House of Representatives from the 9th Norfolk district
- In office January 7, 1999 – March 25, 2004
- Preceded by: Jo Ann Sprague
- Succeeded by: Richard Ross

Personal details
- Born: Scott Philip Brown; September 12, 1959 (age 67) Kittery, Maine, U.S.
- Party: Republican
- Spouse: Gail Huff (m. 1986)
- Children: 2, including Ayla
- Education: Tufts University (BA); Boston College (JD)
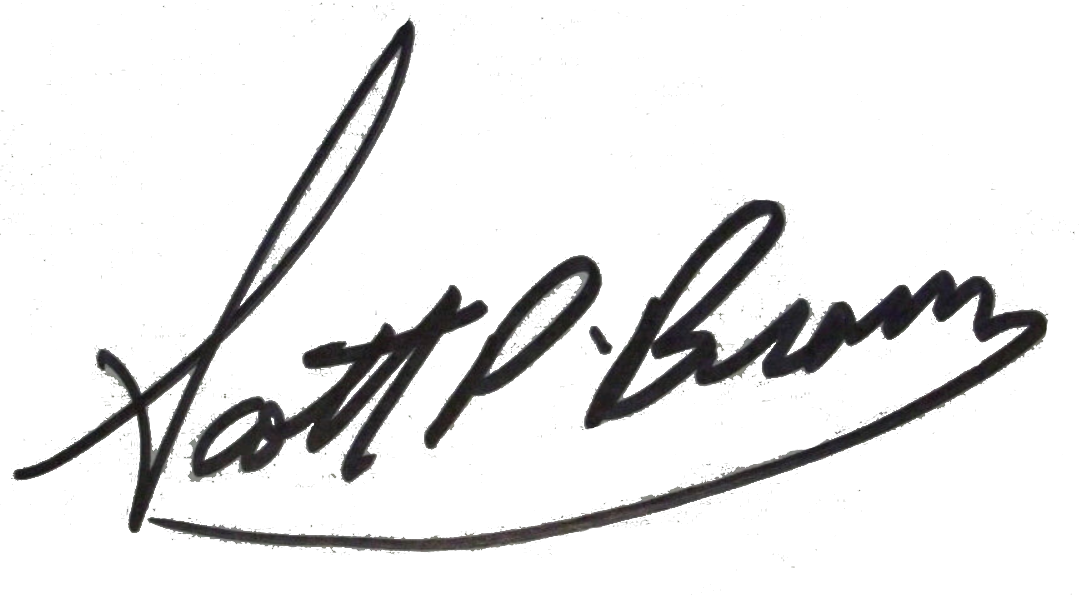
- Signature

Military service
- Allegiance: United States
- Branch/service: United States Army; Massachusetts Army National Guard
- Years of service: 1979–2014
- Rank: Colonel
- Unit: Judge Advocate General's Corps; Army National Guard
- Awards: Army Commendation Medal with 4 oak leaf clusters Meritorious Service Medal; Legion of Merit; Army Reserve Components Achievement Medal (with silver and bronze oak leaf clusters); Armed Forces Reserve Medal (with silver hourglass device); National Defense Service Medal (with bronze service star); Army Achievement Medal (with 2 oak leaf clusters); Global War on Terrorism Service Medal
- Brown's voice Brown on the Boston Bruins winning the 2011 Stanley Cup Finals. Recorded June 16, 2011

Scott Philip Brown (born September 12, 1959) is an American diplomat and politician. A member of the Republican Party, he was the United States ambassador to New Zealand and Samoa from 2017 to 2020 under President Donald Trump.

Brown was a member of the Massachusetts General Court, first in the State House of Representatives from 1998 to 2004 and then in the State Senate from 2004 to 2010. Brown served in the Army National Guard for 35 years, retiring with the rank of colonel in 2014 and receiving the Legion of Merit medal and the Maryland Distinguished Service Cross.

After the death of Ted Kennedy in 2009, Brown was elected to the U.S. Senate in a 2010 special election to complete his term, defeating state attorney general Martha Coakley in a major upset. He ran for a full Senate term in 2012, losing to Democratic nominee Elizabeth Warren, but outperforming former Massachusetts governor Mitt Romney in the concurrent presidential election.

After departing the U.S. Senate, Brown worked in the private sector before moving to New Hampshire and running for Senate there in 2014, losing to incumbent Democrat Jeanne Shaheen in a close race. He ran for the same seat again in 2026, losing to former U.S. senator John E. Sununu in the Republican primary.

== Early life and education (1959–1978) ==
Brown is of English ancestry, from a family that has been in New Hampshire since the colonial era. His earliest American ancestor was 17th century immigrant Francis Matthews, who sailed from Devonshire, England. Brown is part of a 9th generation New Hampshire family and was born on September 12, 1959 at the Portsmouth Naval Shipyard located on Seavey's Island in Kittery, Maine. Brown's father, Claude Bruce Brown, and mother, Judith Ann "Judi" (née Rugg), divorced when he was about a year old. When he was a child, his mother moved with him to Wakefield, Massachusetts. He often spent his summers in Newburyport, Massachusetts, where his father served as a city councilor for 18 years. He also spent summers in Portsmouth, New Hampshire, during his youth. His father and his grandfather were Republicans. His father has said that young Scott became interested in running for political office in the mid-1960s while accompanying him on a campaign for state office.

After her divorce, his working mother received welfare benefits. Brown experienced sexual abuse from a camp counselor who threatened to kill the 10-year-old boy if he told anyone – which he did not disclose, even to his family, until his autobiography Against All Odds (2011) – and physical abuse from his stepfathers. During various periods of his childhood, Brown lived with his grandparents and his aunt. He shoplifted many times, and was arrested for stealing record albums and brought before Judge Samuel Zoll in Salem, Massachusetts, at the age of 13 or 14. Zoll asked Brown if his siblings would like seeing him play basketball in jail and required Brown to write a 1,500-word essay on that question as his punishment. Brown later said, "that was the last time I ever stole."

He graduated from Wakefield High School in 1977 then entered Tufts University where he received a Bachelor of Arts in history in 1981. He received a Juris Doctor from Boston College Law School in 1985. During his undergraduate career at Tufts, Brown was a member of the Kappa chapter of Zeta Psi International Fraternity.

== Early career (1978–1992) ==
=== Army National Guard service (1978-2014) ===
Brown has said the rescue efforts of Army National Guard during the Northeastern United States blizzard of 1978 impressed him. When he was 19, he joined the Massachusetts Army National Guard, received his basic training at Fort Dix, New Jersey, and attended Reserve Officers' Training Corps (ROTC) classes at the campus of Northeastern University. He was trained in infantry, quartermaster, and airborne duties, and in 1994 he joined the Judge Advocate General's Corps (JAG). He was active in the Guard for 35 years rising to the rank of colonel. As the Army National Guard's head defense attorney in New England, Brown defended Guard members who had disciplinary difficulties such as positive drug tests, and provided estate planning and real estate advice to those who were about to deploy to war zones. He spent ten days to two weeks with the Guard in Kazakhstan and a week in Paraguay.

He was awarded the Army Commendation Medal for meritorious service in preparing for troop mobilization for Operation Noble Eagle (the mobilization of National Guard and U.S. Army Reserve personnel to provide security on military installations, airports, and other potential homeland targets) shortly after the September 11, 2001 attacks, and later for mobilization support for Operation Enduring Freedom and Operation Iraqi Freedom. He credits his military experience with causing him to focus on veteran's issues as well as issues of war and peace. He has served on the Senate Committee on Veterans' Affairs, the Hidden Wounds of War Commission, and the Governor's Task Force on Returning Veterans during his career as a legislator.

On May 2, 2011, Brown announced that he would soon go to Afghanistan for training as part of his Army National Guard service. When deployed in August 2011 for training, Brown stationed in and around Kabul.

On August 1, 2012, Brown was promoted to colonel in a private ceremony presided over by fellow senator John McCain. He officially retired from the Army on May 13, 2014, after 35 years of service, and was awarded the Legion of Merit and the Maryland Distinguished Service Cross.

=== Modeling ===
In June 1982, Brown, then a 22-year-old law student at Boston College, won Cosmopolitan magazine's "America's Sexiest Man" contest. After two weeks on a crash diet of "three cans of tuna a day" and intensive workouts he was featured in the magazine's centerfold, posing nude but strategically positioned so that according to Brown, "You don't see anything". In the accompanying interview, he referred to himself as "a bit of a patriot" and stated that he had political ambitions. The Cosmopolitan appearance and its $1,000 fee helped pay for law school, and began for Brown a "long, lucrative" part-time catalog and print modeling career in New York and Boston during the 1980s. Brown took a leave of absence from Boston College and further pursued his modeling career in New York where he was represented by Wilhelmina Models while taking classes at the Benjamin N. Cardozo School of Law. He returned to Boston after nearly two years to continue his studies at Boston College and continued to work as a model.

== State political career (1992–2010) ==
Brown "caught the political bug" in 1992 when he was elected property assessor of Wrentham, Massachusetts. In 1995, he was elected to the Wrentham Board of Selectmen.

He successfully ran for the Massachusetts House of Representatives in 1998, representing the 9th Norfolk District for three terms. Brown again moved up the ladder of state politics to the state Senate in March 2004 when he won a special election to replace Democrat Cheryl Jacques. Brown was re-elected for a full term in November 2004, and again in November 2006, running without opposition the second time. He won re-election in November 2008, defeating Democratic candidate Sara Orozco by a 59–41 percent margin. Following his re-election, Brown was one of five Republicans in the 40-seat Massachusetts Senate. In the Massachusetts Senate, Brown served on committees dealing with consumer protection, professional licensing, education, election laws, public safety, and veterans' affairs.

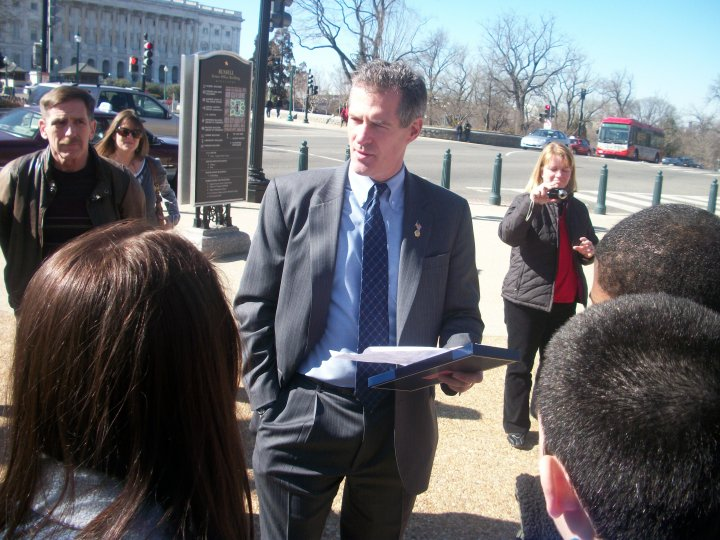
Brown speaking to constituents

In January 2010, The Boston Globe reported that Brown had carved out a niche regarding veterans issues. Republican Richard Tisei called Brown "the acknowledged expert on veterans' issues". Democrat Jack Hart said: "He does his homework, he's comprehensive in his approach, and on veterans' issues, he's one of them and has done a very good job on their behalf."

Brown lists among his achievements as a legislator his authorship of a 2007 law that created a check-off box on state income tax forms for veterans to indicate whether they served in Iraq or Afghanistan. The state uses the information to notify veterans of available services and benefits, including the Welcome Home Bonus that provides $1,000 for those returning from active duty in Afghanistan or Iraq.

== U.S. Senate (2010–2013) ==
=== 2010 election ===
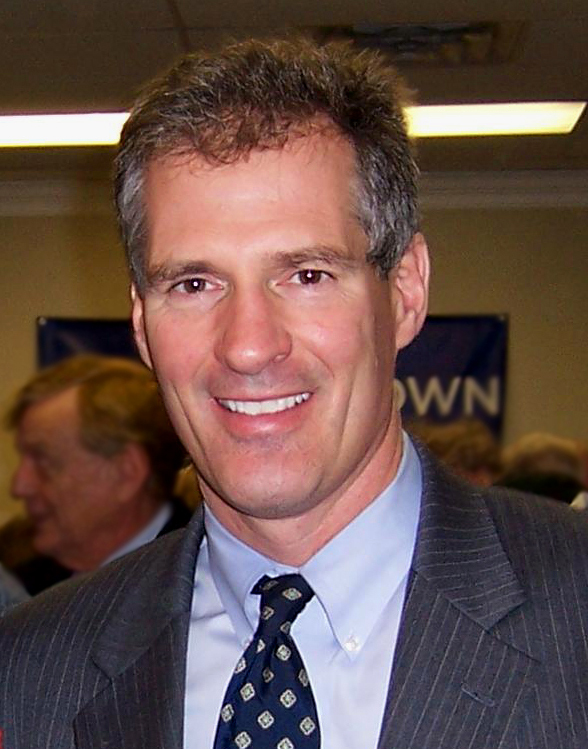
Brown on the campaign trail

On September 12, 2009, Brown announced his run for the U.S. Senate seat that became vacant with the death of Ted Kennedy, saying the state "needs an independent thinker". Washington Post columnist Kathleen Parker said that Brown's political positions did not fall neatly into party lines, and called Brown "mainstream in a nation that defines itself as mostly conservative". Boris Shor, political scientist at the Harris School of Public Policy, described Brown as a liberal Republican by national standards, but well-suited for his Massachusetts constituency. Shor explained the support Brown was receiving from the conservative national Republican Party as due to its "decentralized decision" to support the candidate most likely to win.

Brown won a landslide victory in the Republican primary on December 8, 2009, defeating late entrant and perennial candidate Jack E. Robinson by a margin of 89 percent to 11 percent.

Brown's opponents in the general election were Democratic nominee, Attorney General Martha Coakley, and independent Joseph L. Kennedy (no relation to the Kennedy family). At the outset, he faced overwhelming odds because he was relatively unknown compared to Coakley, he was running as a Republican in a very Democratic state, and much of his campaigning had to be done during the Christmas and New Year's season when citizens do not generally pay much attention to politics. No Republican had been elected to the U.S. Senate from Massachusetts since Edward Brooke in 1972. He polled far behind Coakley for several months, but closed the gap in the early weeks of January.

One week before the January special election, a controversy arose over a Coakley approved television ad. The ad referenced the conscientious objector amendment Brown had sponsored for inclusion in a 2005 proposed state measure on patients' rights. This amendment would have allowed individual healthcare workers and hospitals to refuse to provide emergency contraceptive care (the morning-after pill) to rape victims if they objected due to a religious belief. After the amendment failed, Brown did vote for the main bill which, along with other patient rights, requires healthcare workers and hospitals to provide such care. Coakley's ad featured a male voice that said, "Brown even favors letting hospitals deny emergency contraception to rape victims," over the ad's graphic which had the words, "Deny rape victims care". Brown's daughter Ayla called the Coakley ad "completely inaccurate and misleading", and stated that her father would never deny care to a rape victim. Brown criticized Coakley for running what he described as attack ads.

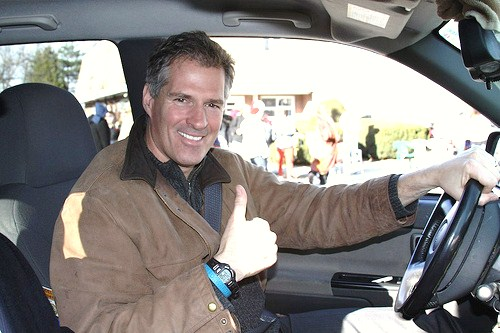
Brown campaigning in his truck.

When told that at various times he has been labeled a conservative, moderate and a liberal Republican, he responded "I'm a Scott Brown Republican." According to Politifact, while Brown was a Massachusetts legislator, he voted about 90 percent with the state Republican leadership; however, Republican leadership in the Massachusetts legislature is generally considered far more moderate than the national Republican Party.

A week before the general election, Brown raised $1.3 million from over 16,000 donors in a 24-hour moneybomb. His campaign office stated it raised $5 million over the period from January 11–15. Charlie Cook of the Cook Political Report stated on January 17 that he would put his "finger on the scale" for Brown as the favorite. The Rothenberg Political Report released a statement that "the combination of public and private survey research and anecdotal information now strongly suggests that Republican Scott Brown will defeat Democrat Martha Coakley in tomorrow's race." Suffolk University's polling of three bellwether counties on January 18 had Brown leading Coakley by double-digit margins. Brown won the January 19 election, performing well in traditional Republican strongholds and holding rival Coakley's margins down in many Democratic precincts.

On election night, after Coakley conceded, Brown gave a victory speech that stated, "It all started with me, my truck, and a few dedicated volunteers. It ended with Air Force One making an emergency run to Logan. I didn't mind when President Obama came here and criticized me – that happens in campaigns. But when he criticized my truck, that's where I draw the line." Brown's upset win stunned the national Democratic party, and foreshadowed nationwide success for Republicans in 2010.

=== 2012 election ===
October 2011 polling showed Brown's approvals had fallen and he faced a competitive re-election if matched against Democrat Elizabeth Warren. However, his numbers in early March 2012 showed he led Warren by 8 points in the polls. In March 2012, Brown's lead had narrowed to 2.3%, within the margin of error. By September 2012, several polls showed Warren with a lead over Brown (though one source still gave Brown an edge).

On November 6, 2012, Brown was defeated by Elizabeth Warren in the general election by a vote of (54%) 1,696,346 to (46%) 1,458,048. Brown managed to significantly outperform Republican presidential candidate Mitt Romney in Massachusetts who was defeated by Democratic President Barack Obama by 60.7% to 37.5%.

=== Tenure ===
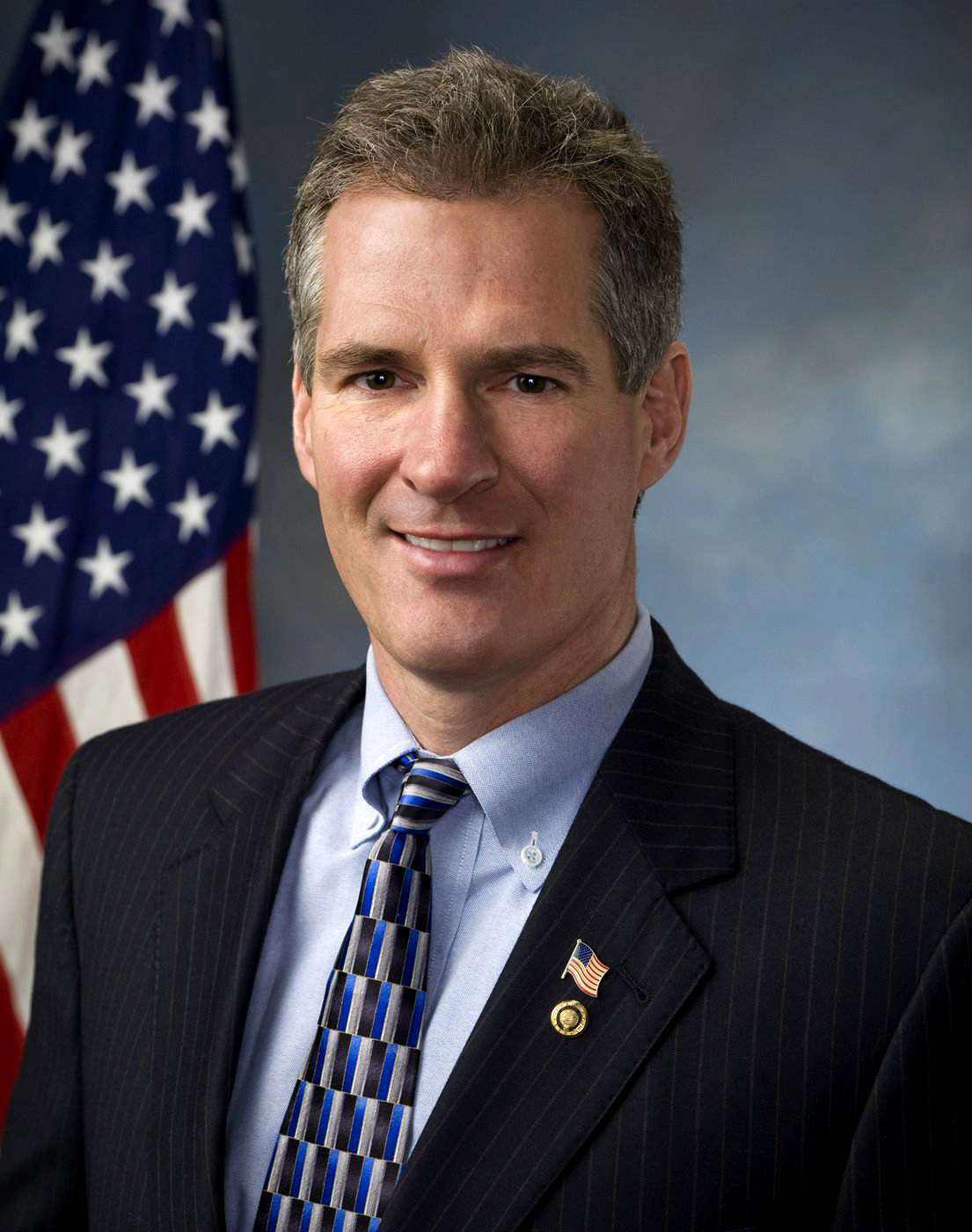
Scott Brown's official senate photo

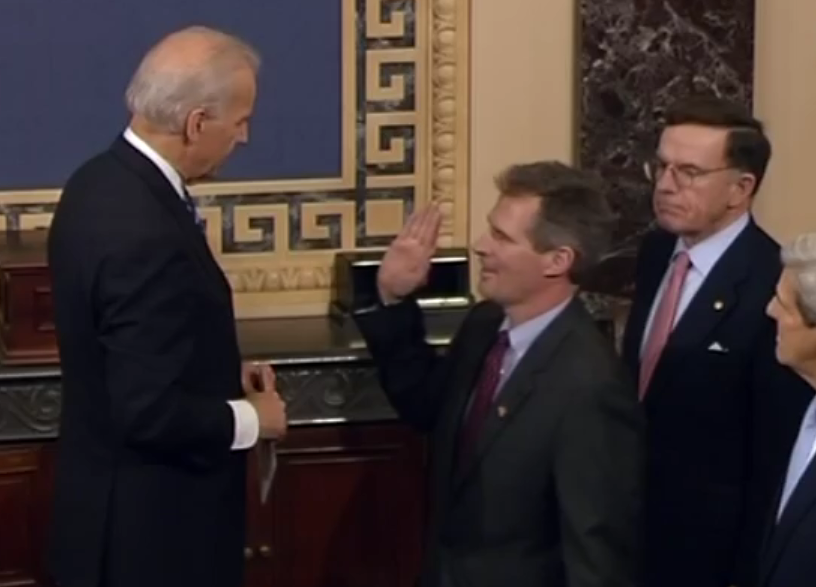
Vice President Joe Biden swears in Brown, as Senators Paul G. Kirk and John Kerry look on.

Brown was sworn into office on February 4, 2010, by Vice President Joe Biden, in his capacity as President of the Senate, on the floor of the Senate. As a Class I Senator, his term lasted until January 3, 2013.

Brown was among the speakers at the Conservative Political Action Conference (CPAC) in Washington, D.C., introducing former Massachusetts governor Mitt Romney. Brown refused to rule out a vote for a Democratic jobs bill proposal, while praising both Senate Majority Leader Harry Reid of Nevada and then-senior Senator John Kerry of Massachusetts for indicating their willingness to work with him across party lines. Brown was one of five Republican senators to vote for cloture on the jobs bill. The motion passed in the Senate 62–30 on February 22, 2010. In an up or down vote on the bill itself on February 24, 2010, Brown voted for final passage, helping to pass the bill 70–28.

Brown met with President Obama in the Oval Office on June 16, 2010.

According to The Washington Post, Brown voted with the majority of Republicans 80% of the time. In the same poll, "56% of Massachusetts voters believed he had kept his promise to be an independent voice in the U.S. Senate."

Brown's views on the 2011 budget cuts and his departures from Republican consensus placed him at odds with some of his fellow Republicans and prominent Tea Party conservatives, including Glenn Beck. He said he opposed these measures because he believed that they would have a negative impact on low income families and children.

In late June 2010, Brown was ranked as "the most popular officeholder in Massachusetts" according to a poll conducted by The Boston Globe. 55% of those polled had favorable opinions of Brown nearly five months after his January 19, 2010, special election victory to finish the term of the late Senator Edward Kennedy. 50% of respondents generally approved of how Brown had handled his new position.

On March 30, 2011, the Democratic Senate Campaign Committee released a poll showing that Brown remained the "most popular politician in the Commonwealth of Massachusetts, with an approval rating of 73 percent." Brown's "'re-elect' score was comfortably above 50 percent, which is unusual for a Republican in an overwhelmingly Democratic state."

=== Committee assignments ===
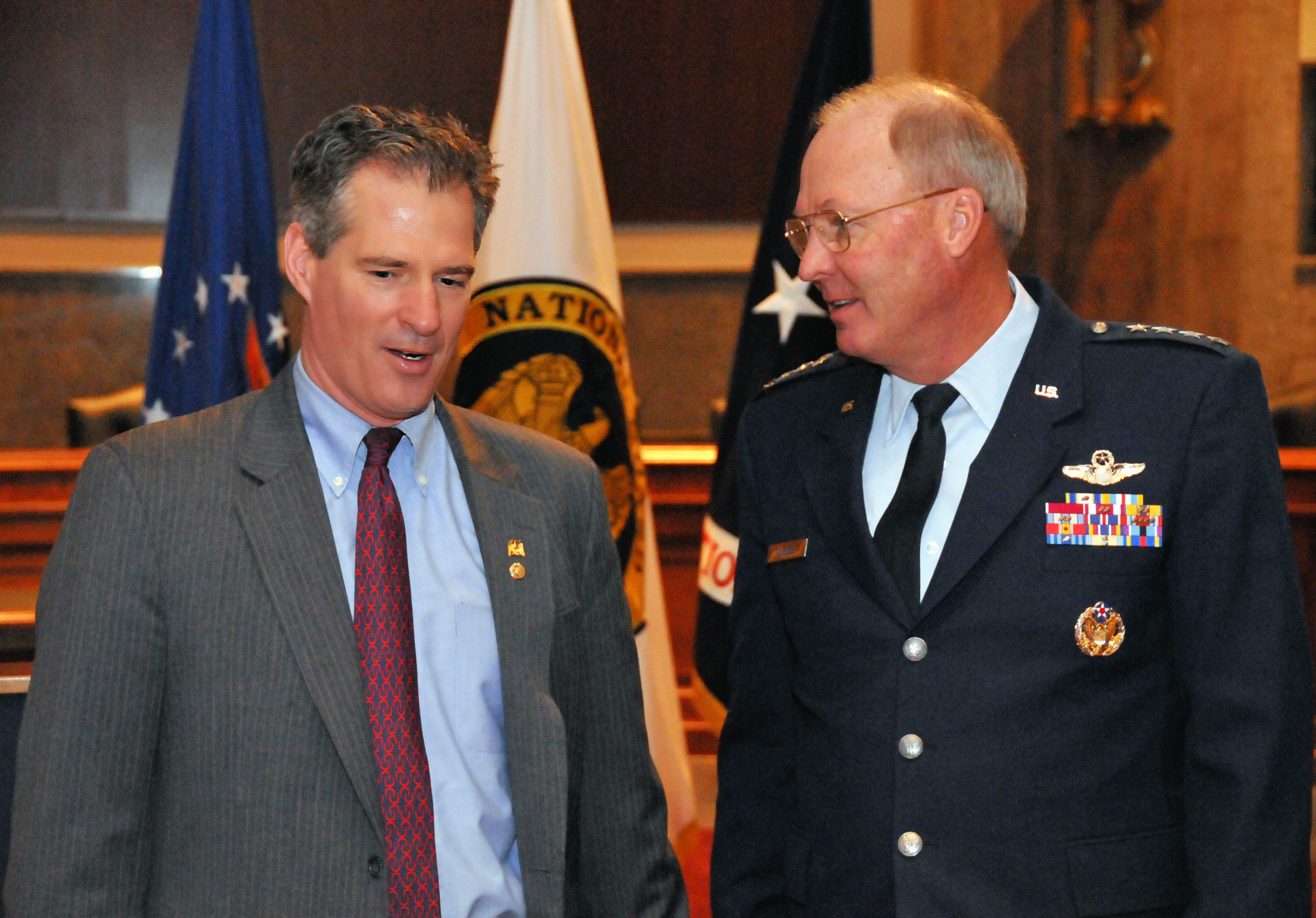
Senator Brown speaking with Chief of the National Guard Bureau General Craig R. McKinley at the Senate National Guard Caucus in 2011.

Brown's committee assignments were as follows.

- Committee on Armed Services
  - Subcommittee on Airland (Ranking Member)
  - Subcommittee on Emerging Threats and Capabilities
  - Subcommittee on Strategic Forces
- Committee on Homeland Security and Governmental Affairs
  - Subcommittee on Disaster Recovery
  - Subcommittee on Federal Financial Management, Government Information and International Security (Ranking Member)
  - Subcommittee on Oversight of Government Management, the Federal Workforce, and the District of Columbia
- Committee on Small Business and Entrepreneurship
- Committee on Veterans' Affairs

Caucus memberships

- Senate Oceans Caucus

== Private sector (2013–2017) ==
On February 13, 2013, Fox News hired Brown as an on-air contributor. In September 2014, Brown's contract was renewed by Fox News.

Following Brown's defeat in the 2012 U.S Senate race there was speculation that he could run again in 2013 due to John Kerry resigning from the other Massachusetts Senate seat to become Secretary of State. However, on February 1, 2013, he ruled out undertaking a third U.S. Senate campaign in less than four years.

Brown joined Nixon Peabody in March 2013, a law firm which provides legal representation and lobbying services. Nixon Peabody reported that Brown would be working with the financial services and commercial real estate industries. In April 2014 Brown left the company. This work later received media attention when Lawrence Lessig with the Mayday PAC called Brown a lobbyist during the 2014 Senate election campaign. Brown's campaign denied the claim and said that Lessig had breached the honor code of Harvard University in making it.

While visiting the Iowa State Fair in August 2013, Brown stated he was open to a 2016 presidential run. On August 21, 2013, Brown, during an interview on WBZ's NightSide With Dan Rea radio program, said he would not be a candidate for Massachusetts governor in 2014.

=== 2014 U.S. Senate campaign ===
On March 13, 2014, Brown began seeking campaign staff while aggressively courting New Hampshire's political elite, marking what local Republicans considered serious steps toward launching a Senate campaign against Democratic Senator Jeanne Shaheen. On April 2, 2014, a local New Hampshire station reported that Brown "confirmed and announced on NH Today that he is running for the US Senate in NH" against Democratic Incumbent Jeanne Shaheen, and would announce the next week.

After much anticipation by the media, Brown announced that he would run for U.S. Senate seat in New Hampshire. Born at Portsmouth Naval Shipyard in Kittery, Maine, to parents who lived near downtown Portsmouth, Brown then spent his early childhood in Portsmouth, New Hampshire and later in Wakefield, Massachusetts following his parents' divorce. He has also been a taxpayer and owned a home in Rye, New Hampshire for more than two decades. In December 2013, he sold his primary home in Massachusetts and expressed to the Rye town clerk "his intention to establish residency and register to vote".

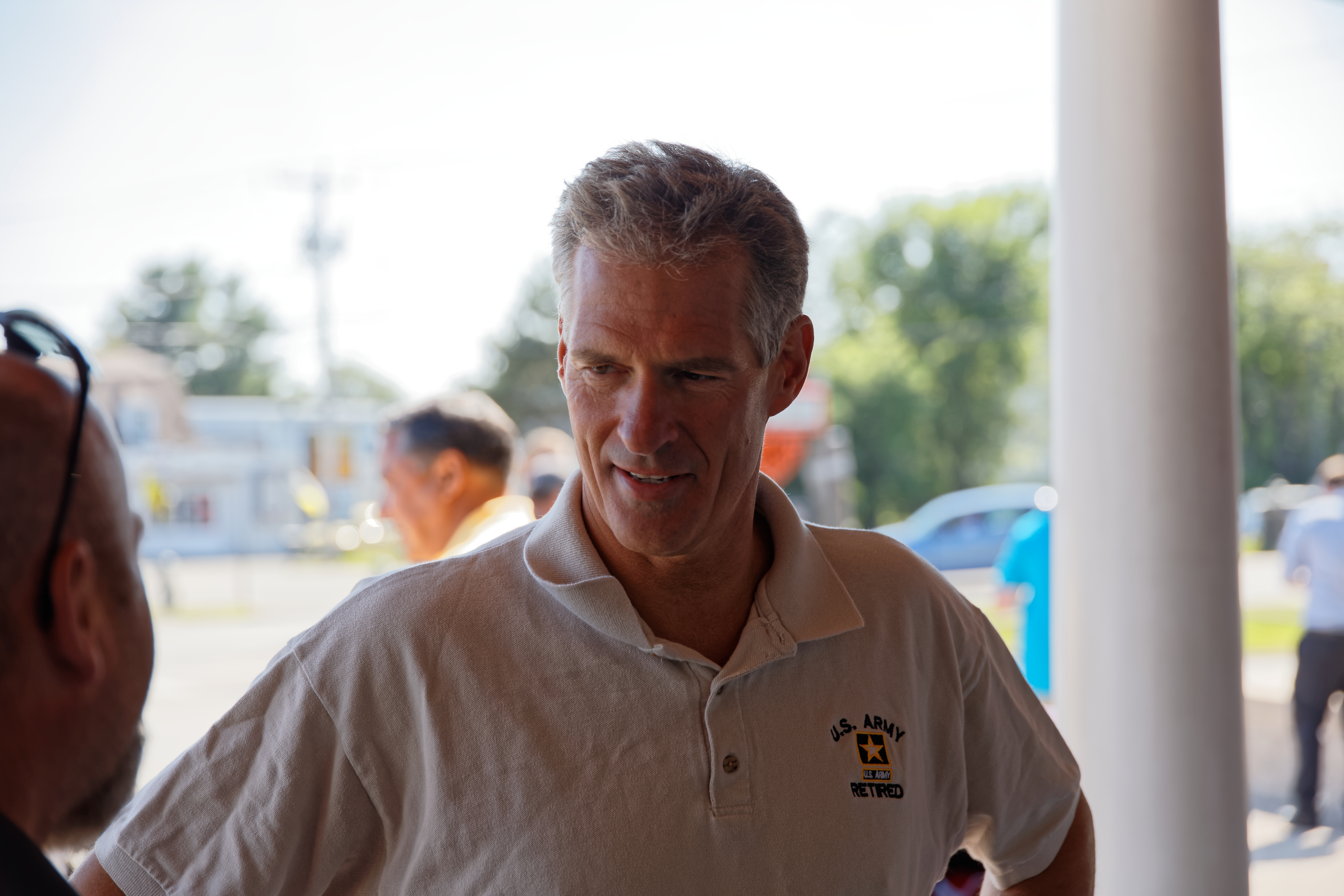
Brown speaking with voters in North Hampton, New Hampshire.

Polling done by various agencies in April and May 2014 showed incumbent Senator Jeanne Shaheen leading Brown by 3 to 5 points. A poll conducted in May by the Republican Governors Association showed Brown leading Jeanne Shaheen by 5 points. In late August, a WMUR/UNH poll showed Shaheen leading Brown by two points, 46 to 44. Polls were mixed in the final three weeks of the election, with most showing Shaheen ahead by 1–8 percentage points, and weekly polls by NH1 News, New England College, and Vox Populi showing Brown leading by 1–4 points.

There were five total debates during the election, three of which were televised. The televised U.S. Senate Debates were hosted by WMUR-TV, NECN, and NH1 News. The WMUR Debate was moderated by George Stephanopoulos of ABC and Josh McElveen of WMUR-TV and was held at Saint Anselm College in Goffstown. The NH1 News Debate was moderated by Wolf Blitzer of CNN and Paul Steinhauser of NH1 and was held at the NH1 Media Center in Concord. The NECN Debate was moderated by Chuck Todd of NBC and was held at the Capitol Center for the Arts in Concord.

Brown narrowly lost to the incumbent Shaheen by a vote of 251,184 (51%) to 235,347 (48%).

=== Post-2014 U.S. Senate campaign ===
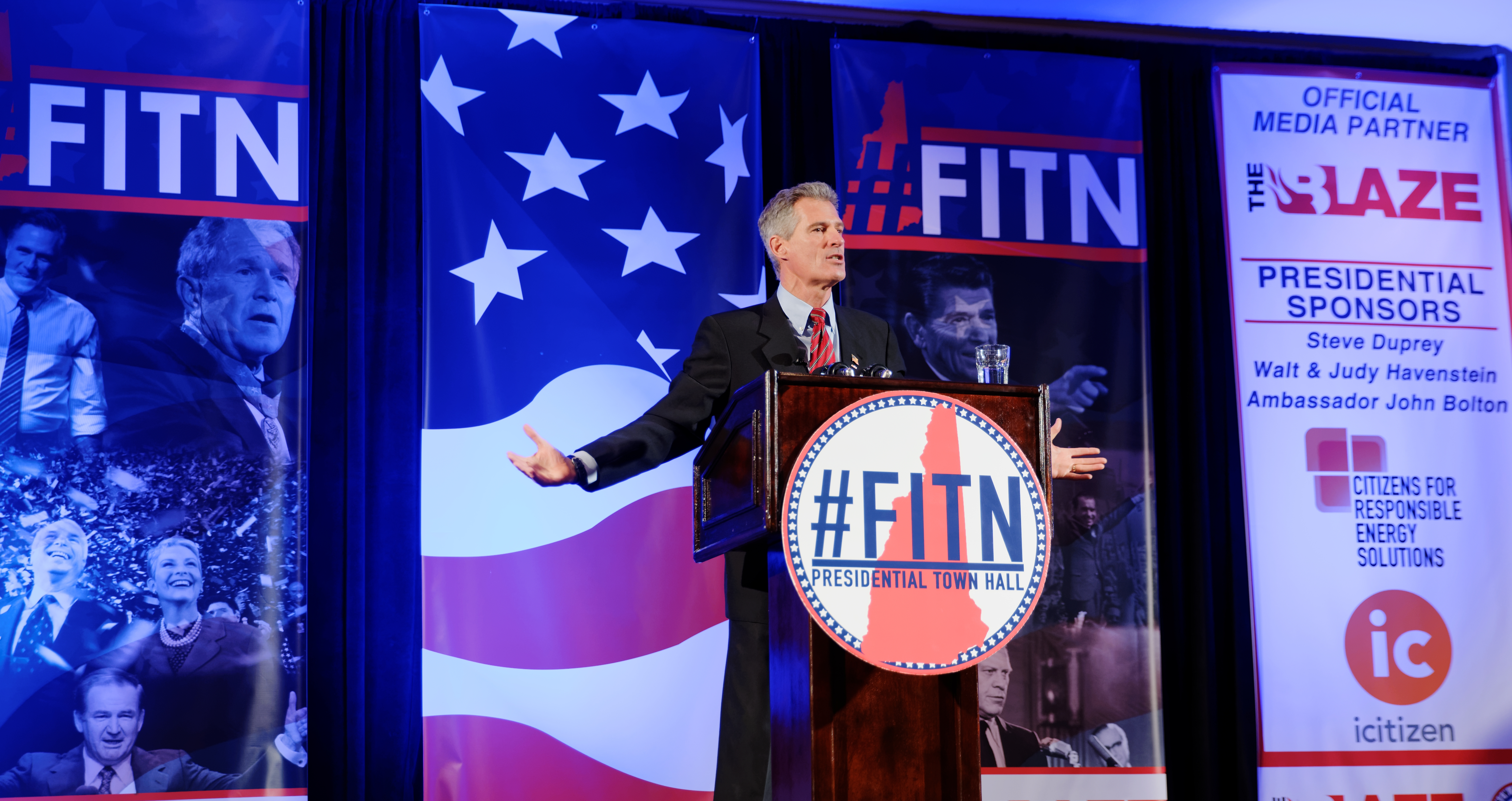
Scott Brown speaking at the 2016 First in the Nation (FITN) Town Hall hosted by the New Hampshire Republican Party

Brown had stated that win or lose in his 2014 New Hampshire senatorial bid, he planned to remain a New Hampshire resident for the rest of his life. In January 2015, it was revealed that shortly after losing to Shaheen, Brown, age 55, filed an application to the Massachusetts State Retirement Board to claim a state pension. Brown did not rule out running for office again in the future. Brown is also working as a contributor for Fox News and as an on-call host for Fox & Friends. Brown was a featured speaker at the 2015 Republican Leadership Summit in Nashua, New Hampshire. Brown continues to play an active role in politics, campaigning and fundraising with senatorial and congressional candidates and meeting with Republican candidates for president in New Hampshire.

In 2015, Brown became an independent representative of AdvoCare, a company that uses multi-level marketing to sell nutrition, weight-loss, energy, and sports performance products.

In February 2016, Brown became the first current or former U.S. senator to endorse Donald Trump's presidential election bid. He introduced Trump to Anthony Scaramucci, who later briefly served as Trump's communications director.

== U.S. Ambassador to New Zealand and Samoa (2017–2020) ==
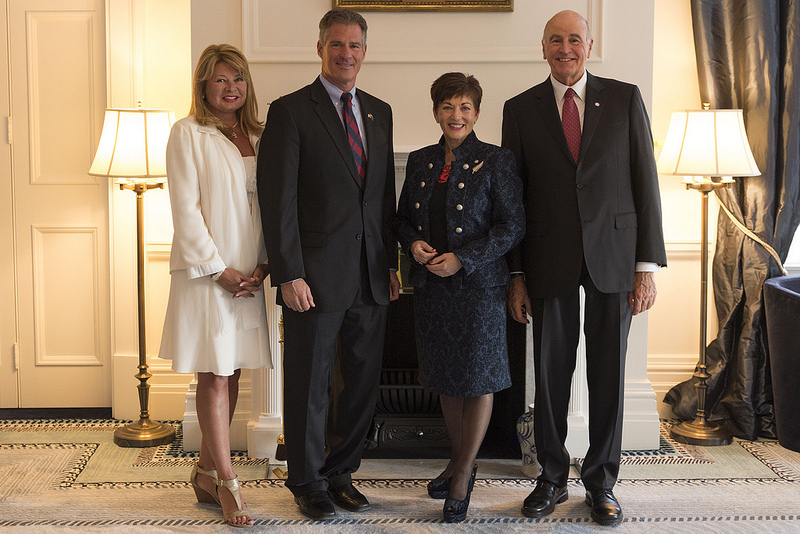
Brown and his wife with Governor-General Patsy Reddy and her husband

On April 20, 2017, President Donald Trump announced his nomination of Scott Brown to serve as the next United States Ambassador to New Zealand and Samoa. Brown was confirmed by the U.S. Senate as Ambassador to New Zealand and Samoa on June 8, 2017 with a 94-4 vote. Brown began his U.S. ambassadorship in New Zealand on June 25, 2017.

Brown met with the New Zealand Prime Minister Bill English on July 4, 2017. They discussed trade, security, and the relationship between New Zealand and the United States. As a goodwill gesture, Brown presented English with a New England Patriots jersey.

Brown departed his ambassadorship on December 20, 2020, upon the close of his term.

== Post-U.S. ambassadorship ==
In December 2020, Brown became the dean of New England Law Boston. He had been selected for this position in November 2019, with an initial agreement being made that he would assume the position in December 2020, at the end of his commitment with the State Department to serve as ambassador. He started his tenure as dean in January 2021. He resigned from this job in August 2021, with his resignation letter citing a difference of vision from that of the board of directors, and declaring that he would "re-engage in the political arena," by supporting "candidates and causes who share my vision of re-building the Republican Party and moving our country beyond partisan gridlock."

In April 2022, it was reported that Brown would lead "The Competitiveness Coalition", a coalition formed in opposition to the proposed American Innovation and Choice Online Act (AICO). Organizations included in the coalition include the National Taxpayers Union, Americans for Prosperity, and the R Street Institute.

=== 2026 U.S. Senate campaign ===
Brown ran as a Republican in the 2026 United States Senate election in New Hampshire, losing the Republican primary to former U.S. senator John E. Sununu on September 8, 2026.

== Political positions ==
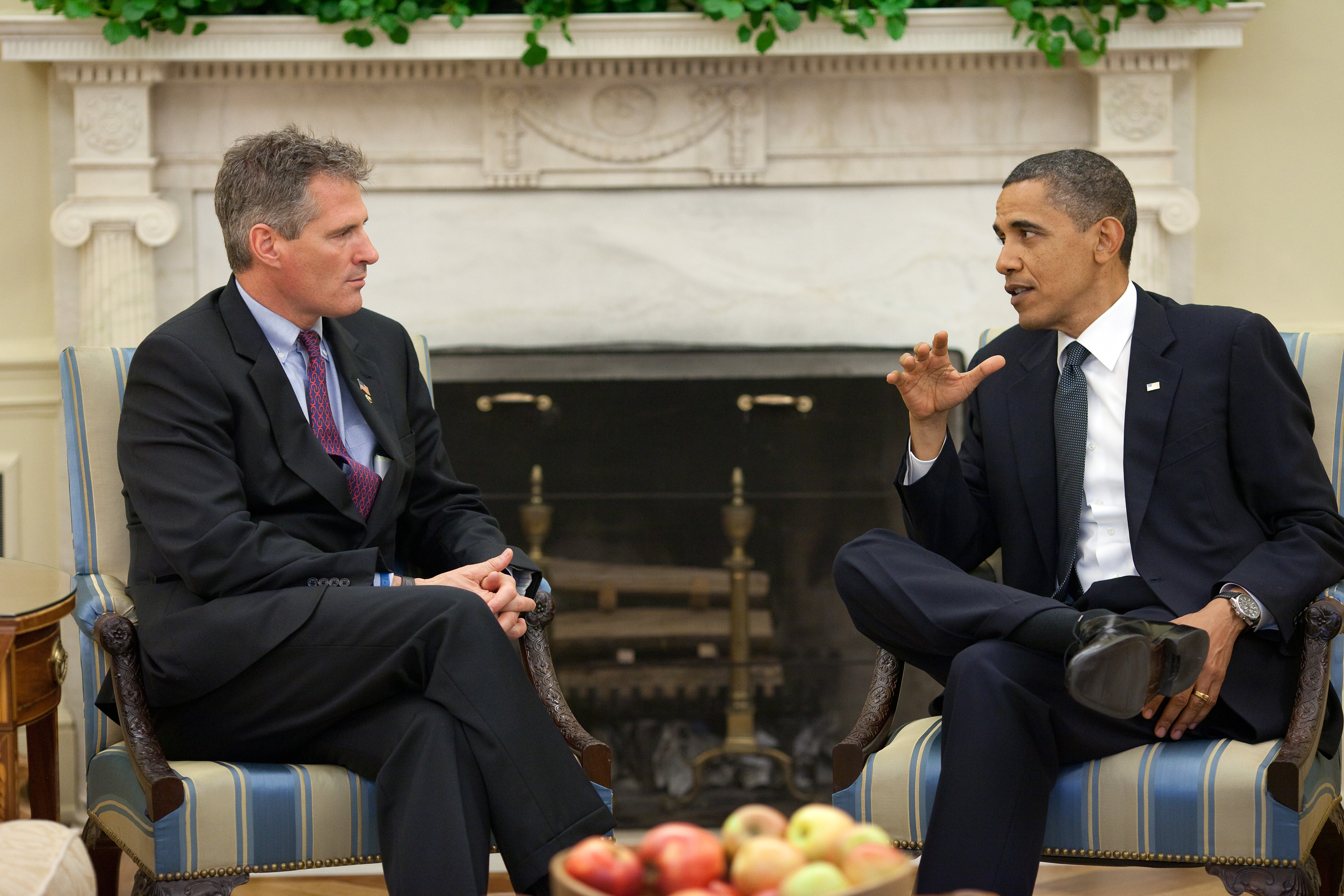
Brown meets President Barack Obama in the Oval Office, June 2010.

Brown described himself as a moderate Republican during his tenure as a U.S. senator. He identifies as a social moderate and fiscal conservative, specifically a "pro-choice moderate Republican." In 2014, Brown said that he voted 50–50 with Democrats and Republicans and described himself as bipartisan. When a senator-elect, he identified himself as a "Reagan Republican" and said, "I'm going to be the only person down there who is going to be the independent voter and thinker ... I've always been the underdog in one shape or form."

Analysis by University of Chicago's Boris Shor found that Brown's voting record as a state legislator was more liberal than two-thirds of Massachusetts Republican state legislators. Political observers noted that Brown supported abortion rights and opposed a constitutional amendment banning gay marriage, taking the position that such issues should be decided by individual states. As a state legislator, he also supported Massachusetts' universal healthcare legislation.

Brown publicly distanced himself from the Tea Party movement, stating that "[he's] not a Tea Party member."

Brown's voting record as a U.S. Senator reflected his stated moderate positions. Congressional Quarterly found that Brown voted with President Obama's 2011 positions on legislation 69.6% of the time. According to GovTrack, Brown was the third most moderate Republican Senator during his tenure. Interest group ratings reflected this positioning: he received a lifetime 53% conservative rating from the American Conservative Union and a 50% liberal rating from the Americans for Democratic Action. The non-partisan National Journal gave him a 2012 rating of 54% conservative and 46% liberal.

Brown's centrist approach, while praised by some for bipartisanship, drew criticism from movement conservatives who viewed him as a RINO or insufficiently conservative.

=== Fiscal policy ===
Brown signed Americans for Tax Reform's Taxpayer Protection Pledge, committing to oppose tax increases. In a January 2012 letter to The Boston Globe, Brown argued against tax increases, writing, "With out-of-control government spending and rising debt and deficits, politicians in Washington have proven time and time again that they cannot manage hard-earned taxpayer money responsibly. So why should we give them even more?"

Brown opposed several financial sector proposals, including a multibillion-dollar tax on banks to recoup bailout money. Through a spokesperson, Brown stated he was "opposed to higher taxes, especially in the midst of a severe recession" and argued that such taxes would likely be passed to consumers through higher fees. Brown also opposed a $30 billion small business lending fund, criticizing it as similar to the Troubled Asset Relief Program.

Brown's relationship with the financial industry drew scrutiny when The Boston Globe reported that campaign contributions from financial firms increased significantly during his negotiations on Wall Street regulatory reform. The newspaper noted that Brown "used the leverage of his swing vote to win key concessions sought by firms" and received over ten times the contributions from the financial services industry compared to the bill's author, Barney Frank.

=== Foreign policy ===
Brown supported President Barack Obama's decision to send 30,000 additional troops to Afghanistan, citing Stanley McChrystal's military recommendations. On counterterrorism policy, Brown advocated for trying suspected terrorists in military tribunals rather than civilian courts and supported the limited use of "enhanced interrogation techniques", including waterboarding against non-citizen terrorist suspects.

=== Veterans services ===
Brown authored legislation in 2007 creating a checkbox on Massachusetts income tax forms allowing veterans to identify themselves for outreach about available benefits. The measure, known as the "Welcome Home" bonus, passed with bipartisan support. As a U.S. Senator, Brown worked with Senator Jack Reed to amend the Dodd–Frank Wall Street Reform and Consumer Protection Act, creating a military liaison office within the Consumer Financial Protection Bureau to protect service members from fraudulent financial practices. The amendment passed the Senate 99–1.

=== Health care ===
Brown's healthcare positions reflected his stated moderate approach. He supported Massachusetts' 2006 healthcare reform requiring universal coverage with state subsidies for those unable to afford insurance. However, Brown opposed President Obama's federal healthcare reform, arguing it was fiscally unsound and pledging during his 2010 campaign to provide the decisive vote to filibuster the legislation in the Senate.

On reproductive healthcare, Brown supported state legislation requiring emergency rooms to provide emergency contraception to rape victims. Brown proposed a "Conscientious Objector" amendment that would have allowed healthcare workers and religious hospitals to refuse to provide the medication based on religious beliefs, while still requiring they arrange alternative access. The amendment failed, but Brown voted for the underlying bill.

=== Energy policy ===
Brown advocated for an "all-of-the-above" energy approach, supporting expansion of solar, wind, and nuclear power, as well as offshore drilling to reduce dependence on foreign oil. However, he opposed the controversial Cape Wind offshore wind farm project off the Massachusetts coast, arguing it would negatively impact tourism and boating in the area.

=== Congressional ethics ===
Brown emphasized bipartisan cooperation as a key aspect of his Senate service, stating his goal was "to work in a bipartisan and bicameral manner." A 2011 Congressional Weekly study ranked Brown as the second-most bipartisan U.S. Senator, noting he voted with his own party only 54% of the time, compared to 96% for his Massachusetts colleague John Kerry.

Brown co-authored the 2011 STOCK Act with Senator Kirsten Gillibrand, legislation to ban insider trading by members of Congress and their staff. The bill received President Obama's public support and passed a major Senate procedural vote 93–2 in January 2012.

=== Abortion ===
Brown described himself as "pro-choice" and stated that Roe v. Wade was settled law. When Republicans adopted a stricter anti-abortion platform in 2012, Brown wrote a letter protesting the decision, calling it a "mistake."

== Organizational associations and honors ==
Brown was a 35-year member of the Army National Guard, retiring as a colonel in the Judge Advocate General's Corps. Brown was awarded the Army Commendation Medal for meritorious service in organizing the National Guard to quickly support homeland security following the terrorist attacks of September 11, 2001. He has also completed Airborne School and been awarded the Meritorious Service Medal.

Brown became a member of the Sons of the American Revolution (SAR) in 2002. His qualifying Patriot ancestor was Phineas Coleman of New Hampshire, who served during the American Revolution. Brown’s membership is recorded in the SAR Patriot & Member Index under member number 158033.

Brown has received the Public Servant of the Year Award from the United Chamber of Commerce for his leadership in reforming the state's sex offender laws and protecting victims' rights. Brown's family has helped raise funds for such non-profit organizations as Horace Mann Educational Associates (HMEA, Inc.), Wrentham Developmental Center, Charles River Arc, and the Arc of Northern Bristol County, all for the care and support of those with developmental disabilities. He has also been recognized by the National Federation of Independent Business (NFIB) for his work in creating an environment that encourages job growth and expansion in Massachusetts. The Boston Globe selected Brown as the 2010 Bostonian of the Year, citing his "profound impact on national politics in the last year".

== Personal life ==
Brown is married to former NH1 News reporter Gail Huff, whom he met through modeling. Huff announced in September 2021 her candidacy in a run for New Hampshire's 1st congressional district in the 2022 election. They have two daughters, including Ayla, an American Idol semi-finalist and 2010 graduate of Boston College.

Brown and his family are members of the Christian Reformed Church in North America. They also have a relationship with a Trappist community of Trappist nuns at Mount St. Mary's Abbey in Wrentham, Massachusetts. The Brown family has "assisted efforts to raise $5.5 million" to replace the abbey's candy factory with a new greener facility with solar panels and a wind turbine.

Brown plays guitar in his spare time, and as of February 2014 had appeared on stage multiple times with American power pop band Cheap Trick as a guest musician. Brown plays guitar with a band called "Scott Brown and the Diplomats."

Brown coached his local Rye, New Hampshire, junior high school boys basketball team in the 2015–16 and 2016–17 seasons before returning to the coaching in 2021. In November 2022 he became the varsity coach of the girls basketball team at Amesbury High School in Massachusetts.

Party political offices
Preceded by Kenneth Chase	Republican nominee for U.S. Senator from Massachusetts (Class 1); 2010, 2012	Succeeded by Geoff Diehl
Preceded by John Sununu	Republican nominee for U.S. Senator from New Hampshire (Class 2); 2014	Succeeded by Corky Messner
U.S. Senate
Preceded by Paul G. Kirk	U.S. Senator (Class 1) from Massachusetts; 2010–2013; Served alongside: John Kerry	Succeeded by Elizabeth Warren
Diplomatic posts
Preceded by Mark Gilbert	United States Ambassador to New Zealand; 2017–2020	Succeeded by Tom Udall
Preceded by Mark Gilbert	United States Ambassador to Samoa; 2017–2020	Succeeded by Tom Udall
U.S. order of precedence (ceremonial)
Preceded by Paul G. Kirk as Former U.S. Senator	Order of precedence of the United States	Succeeded by Mo Cowan as Former U.S. Senator
