= Plainville, Massachusetts =

- Town
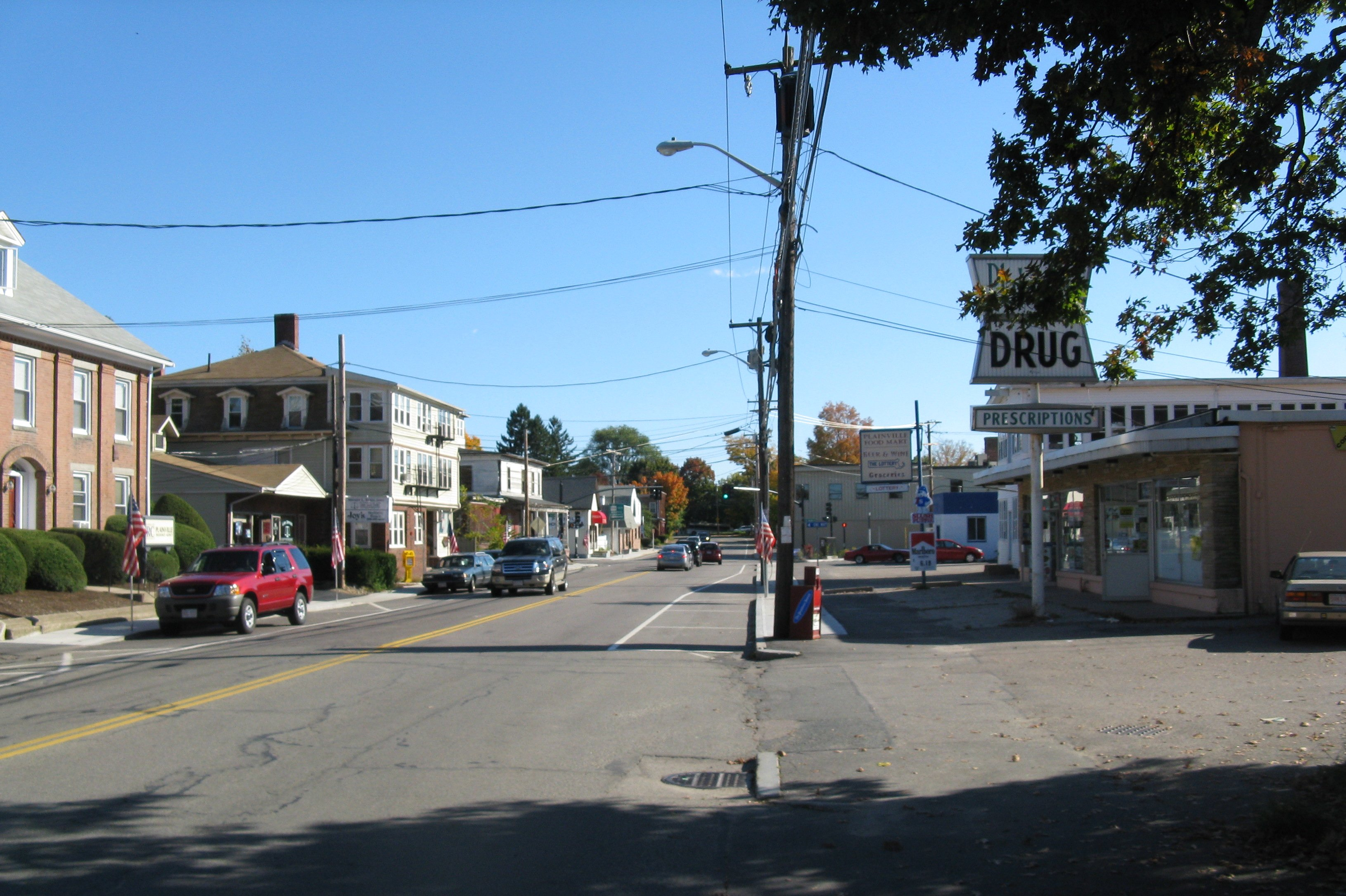
- South Street

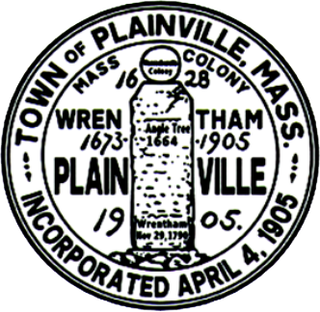
- Seal

- Location in Norfolk County in Massachusetts
- Coordinates: 42°00′15″N 71°20′00″W
- Country: United States
- State: Massachusetts
- County: Norfolk
- Settled: 1661
- Incorporated: 1905

Government
  - Type: Open Town Meeting
  - Town Administrator: Brian Noble

Area
  - Total: 11.5 sq mi (29.9 km^{2})
  - Land: 11.0 sq mi (28.6 km^{2})
  - Water: 0.50 sq mi (1.3 km^{2})
- Elevation: 249 ft (76 m)

Population (2020)
  - Total: 9,945
  - Density: 901/sq mi (347.7/km^{2})
- Time zone: UTC−5 (Eastern)
  - Summer (DST): UTC−4 (Eastern)
- ZIP Code: 02762
- Area code: 508 / 774
- FIPS code: 25-54100
- GNIS feature ID: 0618327
- Website: plainville.ma.us

Plainville is a town in Norfolk County, Massachusetts, United States. The population was 9,945 at the time of the 2020 census. Plainville is part of the Boston and Providence metropolitan areas.

== History ==
Originally included in a 1635 grant of land for Dedham, Massachusetts, the area was later deemed the Plantation of Wollomonuppoag and then later becoming Wrentham, Massachusetts before Plainville branched out as a separate community. Plainville became an officially recognized town on April 4, 1905, making it the third youngest town in the state, behind Millville (1916) and East Brookfield (1920).

One of the earliest documentations of Plainville being settled is from 1674, when a Wampanoag man by the name of Matchinamook petitioned and received a few acres of land at the head of the Ten Mile River, at present day Fuller's Dam. As Matchinamook was a native warrior under Wampanoag chieftain Metacomet, or more commonly known in the area as King Philip, he most likely fought during King Philip's War. In its early days, Plainville was nicknamed Slackville after Benjamin Slack, an affluent landowner at the time. After the establishment of a post office in 1856, Plainville became the town name after the abundance of geographical plains in the area. In 1905, Plainville officially separated from Wrentham and became its own town.

Along with bordering North Attleboro, Massachusetts, Plainville shares the Angle Tree Stone, a historic marker dividing the boundaries between the old Massachusetts Bay Colony and Plymouth Bay Colony. This is why the Angle Tree Stone is in the official town seal. Along with many notable veterans, Plainville was the home to George Robert Twelves Hewes, a Revolutionary War veteran who also partook in the Boston Tea Party as well as the Battle of Rhode Island.

== Geography ==
According to the United States Census Bureau, the town has a total area of 11.6 square miles (30 km^{2}), of which 11.1 square miles (29 km^{2}) is land and 0.5 square miles (1.3 km^{2}) (4.24%) is water.

Plainville borders the towns of Wrentham, Foxborough, Mansfield, North Attleboro, and Cumberland, Rhode Island.

== Demographics ==
Historical population
Year	Pop.	±%
1910	1,385	—
1920	1,365	−1.4%
1930	1,583	+16.0%
1940	1,302	−17.8%
1950	2,088	+60.4%
1960	3,810	+82.5%
1970	4,953	+30.0%
1980	5,857	+18.3%
1990	6,871	+17.3%
2000	7,683	+11.8%
2010	8,264	+7.6%
2020	9,945	+20.3%
2022*	9,865	−0.8%
* = population estimate. Source: United States Census records and Population Estimates Program data.

As of the census of 2000, there were 7,683 people, 3,009 households, and 2,040 families residing in the town. The population density was 694.6 inhabitants per square mile (268.2/km^{2}). There were 3,111 housing units at an average density of 281.3 per square mile (108.6/km^{2}). The racial makeup of the town was 96.77% White, 0.70% African American, 1.63% Asian, 0.25% from other races, and 0.65% from two or more races. Hispanic or Latino of any race were 0.95% of the population.

There were 3,009 households, out of which 33.4% had children under the age of 18 living with them, 56.8% were married couples living together, 7.9% had a female householder with no husband present, and 32.2% were non-families. Of all households 26.2% were made up of individuals, and 9.1% had someone living alone who was 65 years of age or older. The average household size was 2.53 and the average family size was 3.11.

In the town, the population was spread out, with 25.5% under the age of 18, 6.2% from 18 to 24, 33.1% from 25 to 44, 23.1% from 45 to 64, and 12.1% who were 65 years of age or older. The median age was 37 years. For every 100 females, there are 97.6 males. For every 100 females age 18 and over, there were 95.4 males.

The median income for a household in the town was $57,155, and the median income for a family was $68,640. Males had a median income of $50,708 versus $32,377 for females. The per capita income for the town was $25,816. About 2.4% of families and 4.0% of the population were below the poverty line, including 3.6% of those under age 18 and 8.5% of those age 65 or over.

== Government ==
=== Local ===
Plainville Town Hall

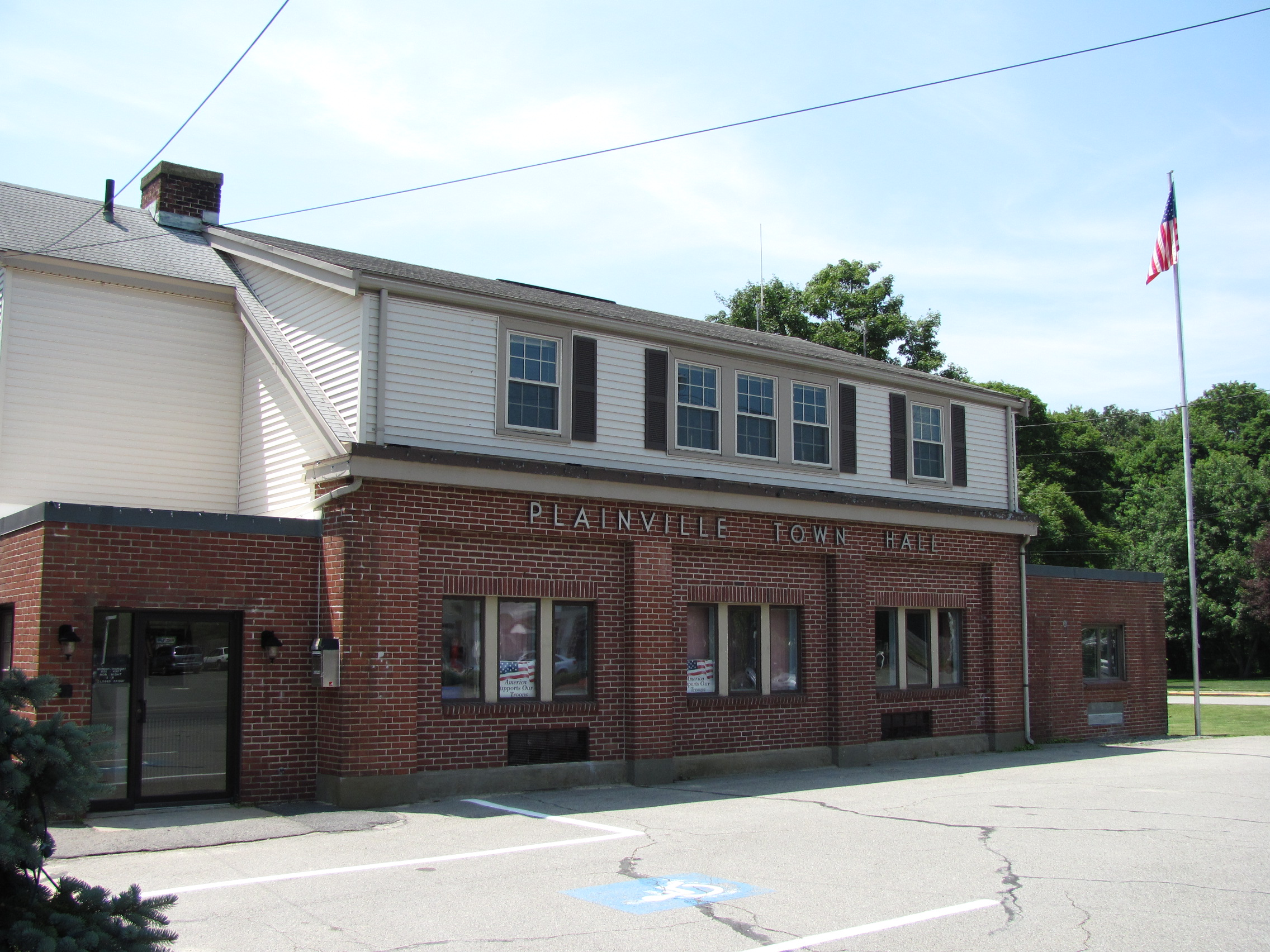
Prior to 2019

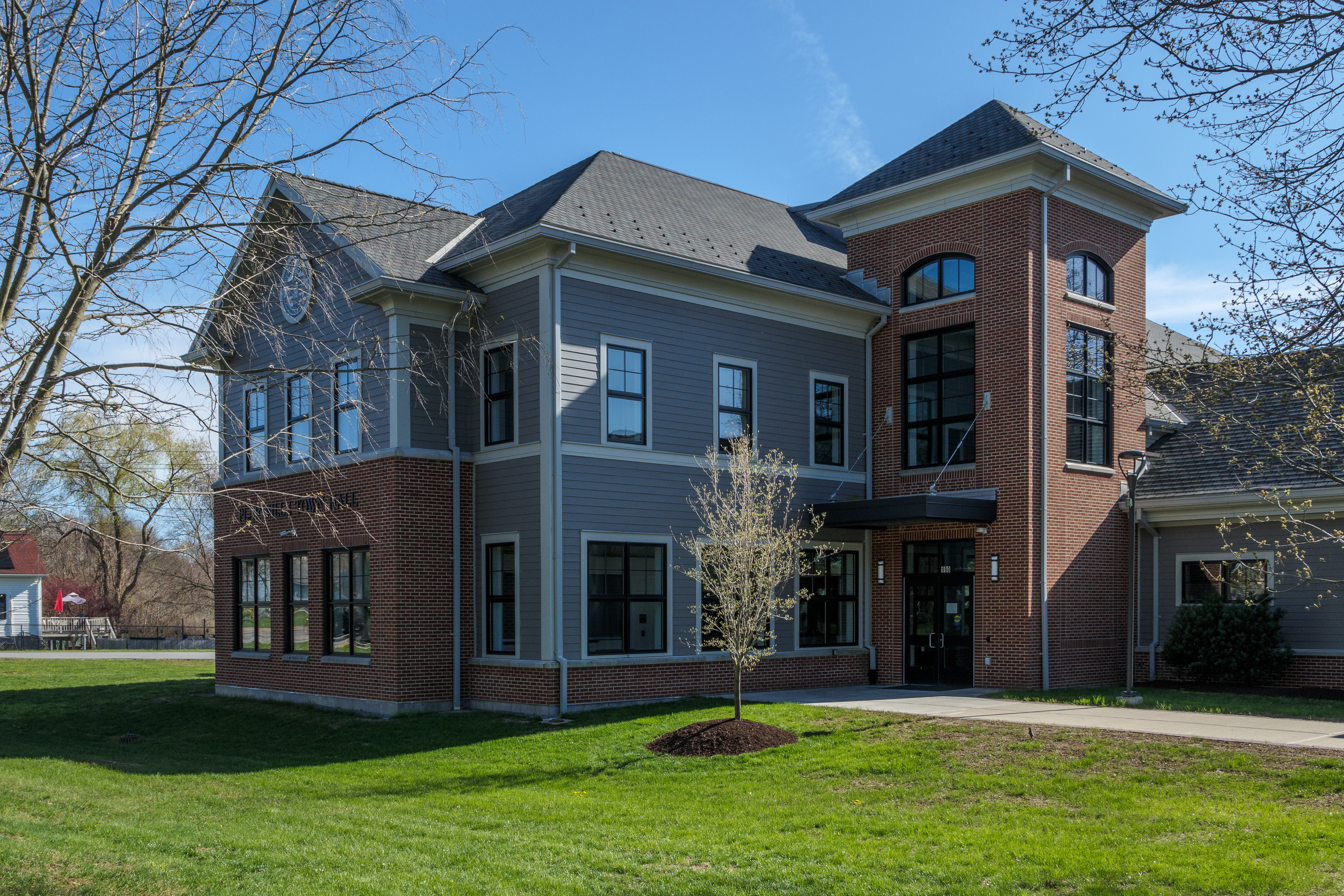
2019-

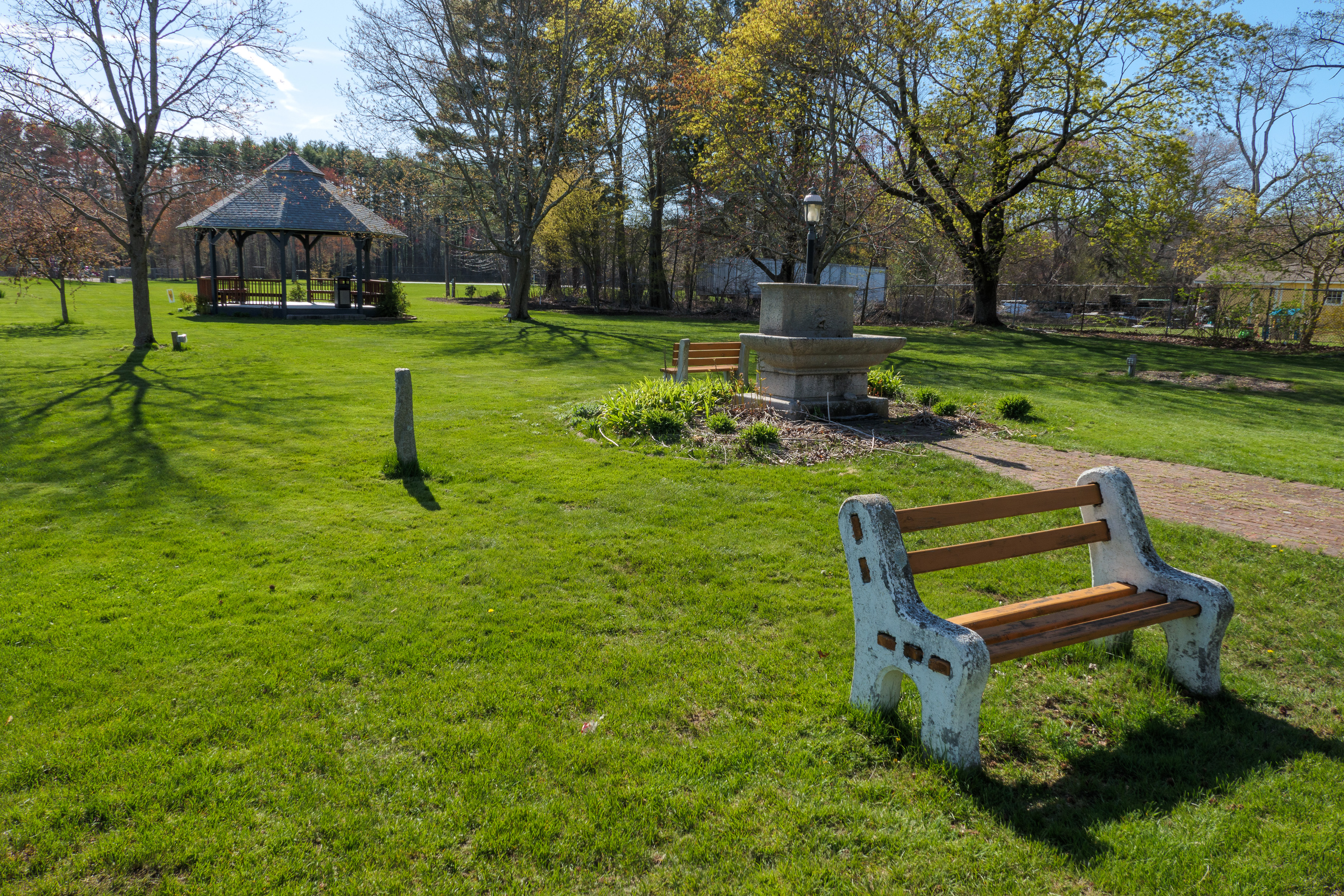
Telford Park

Plainville has a board of selectmen and open town meeting style government. The town has a three-member Board of Selectmen elected to three year terms. The town also elects park commissioners, library trustees, members of the boards of health, assessors, planning, redevelopment, school committee members, and a housing authority. In total there exist 24 boards and committees in town.

The town clerk is Cynthia Bush.

=== State ===
The town is represented in the Massachusetts State Senate by Democrat Rebecca Rausch (Massachusetts Senate's Norfolk, Bristol and Middlesex district). She has served since 2019. Marcus Vaughn, a Republican, represents the town in the Massachusetts House of Representatives (9th Norfolk district).

=== Federal ===
Jake Auchincloss represents the town in the United States House of Representatives, and Elizabeth Warren and Edward Markey represent Plainville in the United States Senate.

== Education ==
Children and teens living in Plainville attend the A. W. Jackson Elementary School for kindergarten through second grade, then the B. H. Wood School for grades 3–6. Children then attend King Philip Middle School and King Philip Regional High School. Other high school options include the Foxborough Regional Charter School, Norfolk Aggie, and Tri-County Regional Vocational Technical High School all in neighboring towns.

Elementary Schools:

- Anna Ware Jackson School (K–3)
- Beatrice H. Wood School (4–6)

For secondary education Plainville is in the King Philip Regional School District. which operates the public middle school and the comprehensive high school for Plainville.

- King Philip Regional Middle School|King Philip Middle School (7–8) - Norfolk
- King Philip Regional High School (9–12) - Wrentham

Plainville is also a member of the Tri-County Regional Vocational Technical High School.

== Infrastructure ==
In 2019, Plainville opened a new $34 million Municipal Complex, which included new space for the Town Hall, Fire Department, and Police. These were sited adjacent to a pre-existing public library on South Street. The new Town Hall replaced one that had been originally built in 1938 as a fire station. The Municipal Complex was funded by tax revenue from a local casino.

== Notable people ==
- Jim Renner, PGA golfer
- Jeff Kinney, Author
