= Becca Rausch =

American politician (born 1979)

Rebecca Rausch
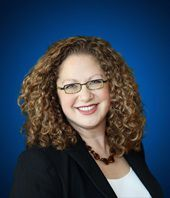

Member of the Massachusetts Senate from the Norfolk, Worcester and Middlesex district
- Incumbent
- Assumed office January 2019
- Preceded by: Richard J. Ross

Member of the Needham Town Meeting
- In office 2017–2018

Personal details
- Born: August 31, 1979 (age 47) Albany, New York
- Party: Democratic Party
- Education: Northeastern University (JD), University of California, Berkeley (LLM in Health Law, Reproduction, Feminist Theory), Brandeis University (BA in American Studies with a minor in Women's Studies)
- Website: beccarausch.com

Rebecca Lynne Rausch (born August 31, 1979) is an American attorney and politician is an American politician serving in the Massachusetts Senate since 2018. A member of the Democratic Party, she represents the Norfolk, Worcester and Middlesex district.

== Political career ==
Becca Rausch served as an elected Needham Town Meeting member from 2017 to 2018. She was first elected to the state senate in November 2018. Rausch won her primary with 53% of the vote. She then defeated Republican incumbent Richard Ross with 51% of the vote.

Rausch's Committee assignments as a State Senator

- Joint Committee on Children, Families, and Persons with Disabilities
- Joint Committee on Elder Affairs
- Joint Committee on Municipalities and Regional Government
- Joint Committee on Public Health
- Joint Committee on Public Service
- Joint Committee on State Administration and Regulatory Oversight
- Joint Committee on Veterans and Federal Affairs

The Massachusetts Women's Political Caucus endorsed her as an incumbent candidate in the 2020 Massachusetts general election.

In 2022, Rausch won reelection over state Representative Shawn Dooley.

In 2025, Rausch visited Israel for the 50 States One Israel conference.

== Personal life ==
Rausch was raised in Albany, New York. She currently lives in Needham, Massachusetts with her husband and two children.

== Career ==
Rausch began her legal career by clerking for Judge Kenneth Laurence of the Massachusetts Appeals Court.

== Education ==
Rausch graduated from Brandeis University in 2001 with a bachelor's in American Studies and a minor in Women's Studies, then went on to earn her Juris Doctor from the Northeastern University School of Law in 2004. She later completed her Master of Laws from University of California, Berkeley in 2011 with a focus in women's health and reproduction and the law. She graduated Shaker High School in Latham, New York in 1997.

2018 Massachusetts' Norfolk, Bristol & Middlesex State Senate District Election
- November 6, 2018
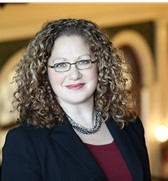

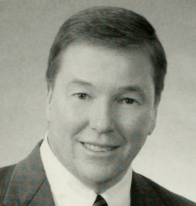
Nominee	Becca Rausch	Richard J. Ross
Party	Democratic	Republican
Popular vote	37,830	35,856
Percentage	51.2%	48.6%
- Municipality results Rausch: 60–70% Ross: 50–60% 60–70%
State Senator before election
Richard J. Ross
Republican
Elected State Senator
Becca Rausch
Democratic

== See also ==
- 2019–2020 Massachusetts legislature
- 2021–2022 Massachusetts legislature
