= Wrentham, Massachusetts =

- Town
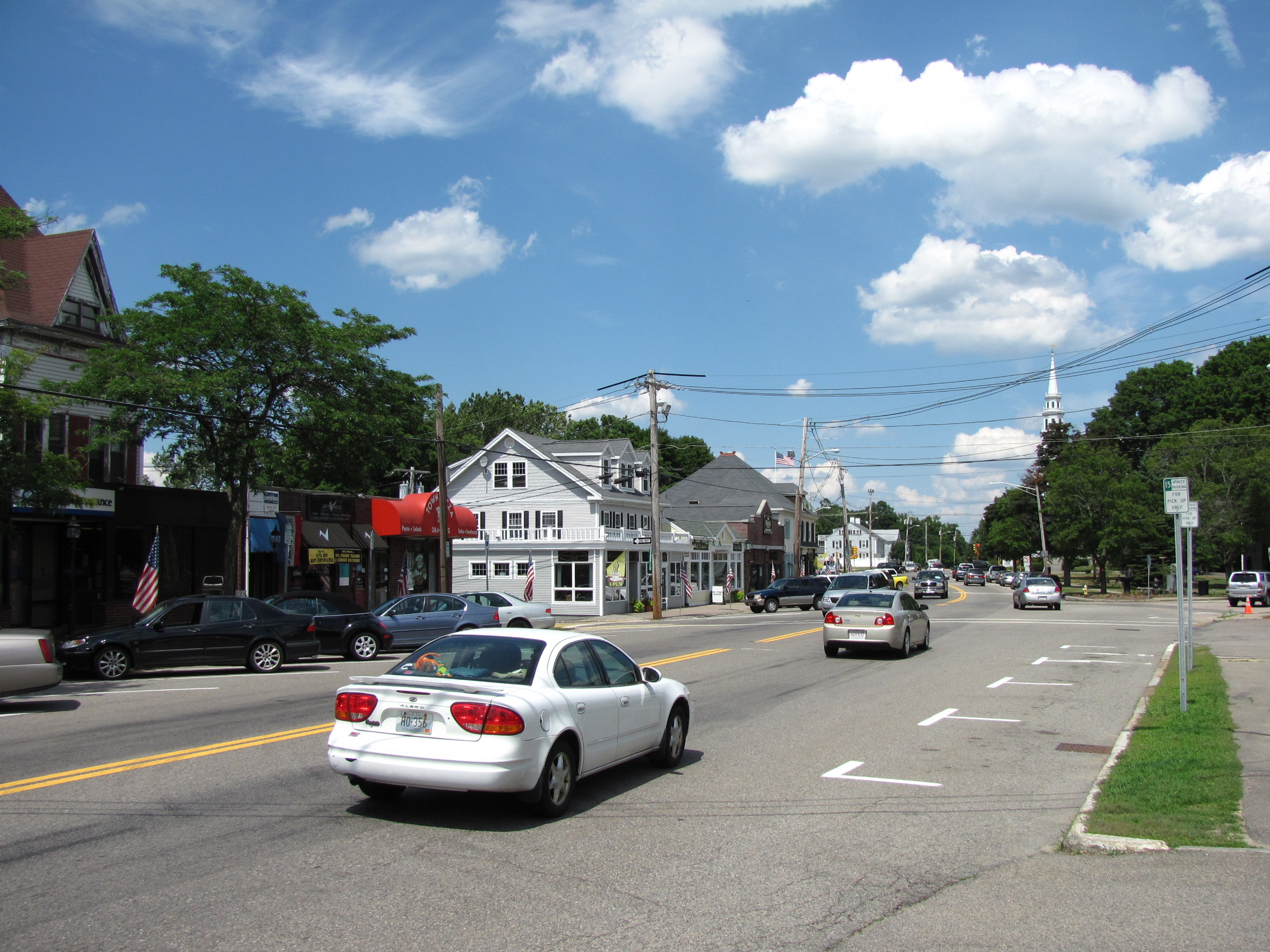
- Downtown Wrentham's South Street in June 2010

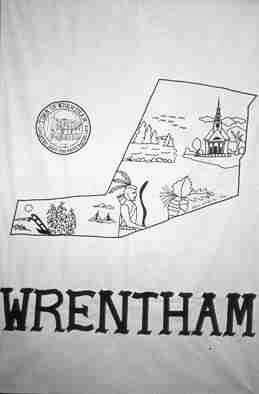
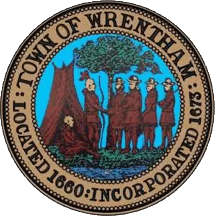
- Flag Seal

- Location in Norfolk County in Massachusetts
- Coordinates: 42°04′00″N 71°19′43″W
- Country: United States
- State: Massachusetts
- County: Norfolk
- Settled: 1660
- Incorporated: October 17, 1673

Government
  - Type: Open town meeting
  - Town Administrator: Michael King

Area
  - Total: 22.9 sq mi (59.4 km^{2})
  - Land: 22.2 sq mi (57.5 km^{2})
  - Water: 0.73 sq mi (1.9 km^{2})
- Elevation: 253 ft (77 m)

Population (2020)
  - Total: 12,178
  - Density: 549/sq mi (211.8/km^{2})
- Time zone: UTC−5 (Eastern)
  - Summer (DST): UTC−4 (Eastern)
- ZIP Codes: 02093 (Wrentham); 02070 (Sheldonville)
- Area code: 508/774
- FIPS code: 25-82315
- GNIS feature ID: 0618334
- Website: www.wrentham.gov

Wrentham (/ˈrɛnθəm/ REN-thəm) is a town in Norfolk County, Massachusetts, United States. The population was 12,178 at the 2020 census.

== History ==
In 1660, five men from Dedham were sent to explore the lakes near George Indian's wigwam and to report back to the selectmen what they found. The report of those men, Daniel Fisher, Anthony Fisher, Sgt. Fuller, Richard Ellis, and Richard Wheeler, was received with such enthusiasm that in March 1661 it was voted to start a new settlement there. The Town then voted to send Ellis and Timothy Dwight to go negotiate with King Philip to purchase the title to the area known as Wollomonopoag.

They purchased 600 acres (Note: Dwight has the figure as 6 square miles (16 km^{2}).) of land for £24, 6s. The money was paid out of pocket by Captain Willett, who accompanied Ellis and Dwight. The Town voted to assess a tax upon the cow commons to repay him, but some thought the money should be paid by those who would be moving to the new village. The dispute resulted in Willet not being paid back for several years.

After the boundaries of the new community were set, the Town voted to give up all rights to the land in return for the proprietors paying Dedham £160 over four years, beginning in 1661. By January 1663, however, little progress had been made towards establishing a new village. A meeting was called, and the 10 men (Note: It is not known who all 10 were, but they included Anthony Fisher, Richard Ellis, Robert Weare, and Isaac Bullard.) who volunteered to go raised several concerns about their ability to move forward.

After much discussion, it was decided not to give the 600 acres to the group of pre-selected men, but rather to lay out lots and then award them by lottery. Those who already began to improve their lots were allowed to keep them, (Note: Those granted a dispensation included Richard Ellis, Anthony Fisher, Jr., Robert Weare, Isaac Bullard, James Thorpe, Samuel Fisher, Samuel Parker, Joshua Kent and John Farrington . Ralph Freeman, Daniel Makiak, and Sgt. Stearnes did not have pre-selected lots of land, but were among the first settlers.) and land for a church, burial ground, training ground, roads, and officer lots were not included. All were free to buy and sell their lots.

Not much happened at Wollomonopoag until 1668, at which time a report arrived of native peoples planting corn and cutting down trees on the land that Dedham had purchased. Eleazer Lusher was charged with sending the native group—who did not read English—a letter that warned them to "depart from that place and trespass no further." Samuel Fisher then took it to them and read it aloud, at which point they replied that they had every intention of remaining on the land. Though they had still not paid him back for the land in question, the Town then asked Willett to speak with King Philip and ask that he intervene.

There is no record of Philip's response to that entreaty but, in August 1669, (Note: Hanson has the letter dated May 25, 1669. Dwight has the date of offer to be in November.) the Town Fathers received an odd letter from him offering to negotiate for more land if they would quickly send him a "holland shirt." Dwight and four others were appointed to negotiate with him again, provided Philip could prove he, and not another sachem, had the rights to the land. In November, an agreement was reached to clear the title for £17 0s 8d. There is no record of whether a shirt was traded.

Samuel Sheares lived alone at Wollomonopoag for some time before a new attempt at a settlement was undertaken in 1671. Five men, John Thurston, Thomas Thurston, Robert Weare, John Weare, and Joseph Cheeney moved there with him, followed the next year by Rev. Samuel Man, (Note: Man would minister there for 49 years.) a one-time teacher in the Dedham Public Schools. Robert Crossman was employed at the same time to construct a corn mill.

Those who moved there were drawn from the middle class of Dedham. They were primarily people from outside of Dedham who had purchased land there, and second generation Dedhamites who moved without their parents. Without the outsides, it is questionable whether the new community would have survived.

Soon, however, the Wollomonopoag settlers complained that those in the village center were keeping them in a state of colonial dependency. They were upset about absentee landlords whose land values were going up thanks to the labor of the inhabitants and who refused to pay taxes to support the community. They also complained that with the seat of the town government being so far away that they were disenfranchised and best by a lack of capital. Constables refused to travel to Wollomonopoag to make collections, assessments, and social judgement.

With the blessing of Dedham's Board of Selectmen, the General Court separated the new town of Wrentham on October 16, 1673.

It was burned down during King Philip's War 1675–1676. In the nineteenth century, Wrentham was the site of Day's Academy. For a short time, Wrentham was the residence of the educational reformer Horace Mann. It is also known as one of the residences of Helen Keller.

North Wrentham separated as an independent town in 1870 with Plainville splitting off as an independent town in 1905.

== Geography ==
According to the United States Census Bureau, the town has a total area of 22.9 square miles (59 km^{2}), of which 22.2 square miles (57 km^{2}) is land and 0.7 square miles (1.8 km^{2}) (3.14%) is water. Wrentham is bordered by Norfolk on the north, Foxboro on the east, Plainville and Cumberland, Rhode Island on the south, Bellingham on the southwest, and Franklin on the west. It has two large lakes towards the center of town, Lake Pearl and Lake Archer, as well as Mirror Lake on the Wrentham/Norfolk border and numerous smaller lakes. Sheldonville, or West Wrentham, is a rural section of Wrentham located on the western leg of town. Sheldonville still maintains a unique identity as the old farming section of Wrentham, has active commercial orchards, and has its own ZIP Code (02070). Wrentham drains into four watersheds. They are the Charles River to the north, the Taunton River to the east, the Blackstone River to the west, and the Ten Mile River to the south.

Wrentham is the only town of that name in the United States. It is named after the village of Wrentham, Suffolk, England. The only other Wrentham is Wrentham, Alberta. Wrentham, Massachusetts, is by far the most populous of the three.

== Demographics ==
Historical population
Year	Pop.	±%
1790	1,767	—
1850	3,037	+71.9%
1860	3,406	+12.2%
1870	2,292	−32.7%
1880	2,481	+8.2%
1890	2,566	+3.4%
1900	2,720	+6.0%
1910	1,743	−35.9%
1920	2,808	+61.1%
1930	3,584	+27.6%
1940	4,674	+30.4%
1950	5,341	+14.3%
1960	6,685	+25.2%
1970	7,315	+9.4%
1980	7,580	+3.6%
1990	9,006	+18.8%
2000	10,554	+17.2%
2010	10,955	+3.8%
2020	12,178	+11.2%
2023*	12,543	+3.0%
* = population estimate. Source: United States census records and Population Estimates Program data.

As of the census of 2000, there were 10,554 people, 3,402 households, and 2,653 families residing in the town. The population density was 475.5 inhabitants per square mile (183.6/km^{2}). There were 3,507 housing units at an average density of 158.0 per square mile (61.0/km^{2}). The racial makeup of the town was 97.64% White, 0.61% African American, 0.12% Native American, 0.80% Asian, 0.01% Pacific Islander, 0.32% from other races, and 0.50% from two or more races. Hispanic or Latino of any race were 0.79% of the population.

There were 3,402 households, out of which 43.0% had children under the age of 18 living with them, 68.3% were married couples living together, 6.6% had a female householder with no husband present, and 22.0% were non-families. 17.0% of all households were made up of individuals, and 7.0% had someone living alone who was 65 years of age or older. The average household size was 2.89 and the average family size was 3.31.

In the town, the population was spread out, with 27.8% under the age of 18, 4.8% from 18 to 24, 31.4% from 25 to 44, 24.4% from 45 to 64, and 11.6% who were 65 years of age or older. The median age was 39 years. For every 100 females, there were 95.7 males. For every 100 females age 18 and over, there were 92.4 males.

The median income for a household in the town was $78,043.50, and the median income for a family was $89,058.99. Males had a median income of $58,776 versus $37,219 for females. The per capita income for the town was $30,792.56. About 1.6% of families and 3.9% of the population were below the poverty line, including 4.2% of those under age 18 and 10.5% of those age 65 or over.

== Government ==
Local

Wrentham has a board of selectmen style government. The town is governed by five selectmen, each elected for three year staggered terms. The current members are Joseph F. Botaish II, Christopher Gallo, Michelle Rouse, James Anderson, and William Harrington.

In addition to the select board, there exist 12 other boards and committees in town. This includes the Board of Assessors, Board of Health, Community Preservation Committee, Conservation Commission, Cultural Council, Economic Development Commission, Finance Committee, Historical Commission, Open Space Committee, Planning Board, Recreation Commission, and Zoning Board of Appeals.

State

The town is part of the Massachusetts Senate's Norfolk, Bristol and Middlesex district where it has been represented by Rebecca Rausch since 2019. Since 2023 Marcus Vaughn, a Republican, has represented the town in the Massachusetts House of Representatives (9th Norfolk district).

Federal

Federally, Wrentham is part of Massachusetts's 4th congressional district, represented by Democrat Jake Auchincloss, elected in 2020. Elizabeth Warren and Edward Markey represent the town in the United States Senate. Republican Scott Brown, a former United States senator, was a resident of Wrentham when he won the special election on January 19, 2010.

== Education ==
The Wrentham Elementary School consists of three buildings which separate the different grade levels. There is the Delaney Elementary School for the lowest grades, the Vogel Elementary School for a mix of lower grades and unified arts, and the Roderick Elementary School for the highest grades (up to grade 6). All 3 of these buildings are located on one Wrentham Elementary School campus located off of Taunton St & Randall Rd in the center of Wrentham.

For secondary education Wrentham is in the King Philip Regional School District, which operates the public middle school and the comprehensive high school for Wrentham. King Philip Regional High School, located on Franklin St, is the town's public high school and serves students from Wrentham, Norfolk, and Plainville. Students in middle school attend King Philip Regional Middle School in Norfolk. Surrounding high schools, such as Tri-County Regional Vocational Technical High School in Franklin, and Norfolk County Agricultural High School in Walpole, as well as the Catholic Bishop Feehan High School in Attleboro, are also available to Wrentham students.

== Transportation ==
Wrentham is a member of the Greater Attleboro Taunton Regional Transit Authority.

== Notable people ==
- Dale Arnold, radio host
- Ayla Brown, singer and basketball player
- Scott Brown, former U.S. Ambassador to New Zealand and Samoa and U.S. Senator from Massachusetts
- John Cena, professional wrestler and actor
- Cesar Chelor, the earliest documented African-American plane maker in North America
- Chris Doughty, businessman and politician who ran in the 2022 Massachusetts Gubernatorial elections as a Republican
- Charlotte W. Hawes, composer
- Gail Huff, former News Reporter for WCVB-TV
- Helen Keller, suffragist and author
- Jake Layman, NBA basketball player
- Evan McGill, Three-Time Tony Award–Winning Producer
- Garth Snow, former NHL goaltender and former GM of the New York Islanders
- Scott Zolak, former NFL quarterback and current host/color commentator

== Works cited ==
- Dwight, Benjamin Woodbridge (1874). The History of the Descendants of John Dwight, of Dedham, Mass. J. F. Trow & son, printers and bookbinders.
- Hanson, Robert Brand (1976). Dedham, Massachusetts, 1635–1890. Dedham Historical Society.
- Lockridge, Kenneth (1985). A New England Town. New York: W. W. Norton & Company. ISBN 978-0-393-95459-3.
