= Sexual abuse scandal in the Archdiocese of Boston =

Sexual abuse cases in the United States

The Archdiocese of Boston sex abuse scandal was part of a series of Catholic Church sex abuse cases in the United States that revealed widespread crimes in the American Catholic Church. The Archdiocese of Boston includes the City of Boston and several counties in eastern Massachusetts.

In early 2002, The Boston Globe published results of an investigation titled "Spotlight Investigation: Abuse in the Catholic Church" that led to the criminal prosecutions of five Catholic priests and brought the sexual abuse of minors by Catholic clergy to national attention. Another accused priest who was involved in the scandal also pleaded guilty. The Globe's coverage encouraged other victims to come forward with allegations of abuse, resulting in numerous lawsuits and 249 criminal cases.

Subsequent investigations and allegations revealed a pattern of sexual abuse and cover-ups in a number of large dioceses across the United States. What had first appeared to be a few isolated cases of abuse became a nationwide scandal, then a global crisis for the Catholic Church.

Ultimately, it became clear that priests and lay members of religious orders in the Catholic Church had sexually abused minors on a scale such that the accusations reached into the thousands over several decades. Although the majority of cases were reported to have occurred in the United States, victims have come forward in other nations such as Ireland, Canada, Australia, New Zealand and India. A major aggravating factor was the actions of Catholic bishops to keep these crimes secret and to reassign the accused to other parishes in positions where they had continued unsupervised contact with youth, thus allowing the abusers to continue their crimes.

The Globe's in-depth reporting was the central subject of Tom McCarthy's film Spotlight in 2015, which won two Academy Awards including Best Picture.

== History ==
=== Boston Globe coverage ===
In 2002, criminal charges were brought against five Catholic priests in the Boston, Massachusetts area (John Geoghan, John Hanlon, Paul Shanley, Robert V. Gale and Jesuit priest James Talbot) who were all convicted and sentenced to prison. The ongoing coverage of these cases by The Boston Globe brought the issue of "sexual abuse of minors by Catholic priests" into the national spotlight. (Note: In 2003, The Boston Globe received a Pulitzer Prize for Public Service. The newspaper was honored, according to the Pulitzer website, "for its courageous, comprehensive coverage....an effort that pierced secrecy, stirred local, national and international reaction and produced changes in the Roman Catholic Church.")

=== Cover-ups ===
Grassroots public advocacy groups like Voice of the Faithful focused on Cardinal Bernard Francis Law after documents revealed his extensive role in covering up incidents of sexual misconduct of his priests. For example, Law moved Shanley and Geoghan from parish to parish within the diocese despite repeated allegations of molestation of children under the priests' care. Later, it was discovered that Shanley had addressed a 1978 conference that led to formation of the North American Man/Boy Love Association (NAMBLA).

In 1984, Bishop John McCormack became secretary for ministerial personnel in the Archdiocese of Boston. In this role, McCormack was Law's point of interface for reviewing complaints against priests accused of sexual misconduct and removing some of them from active duty. He was later accused of taking too little action in handling Geoghan, a Boston priest who allegedly molested over 130 children during his ministry.

In 1990, after receiving complaints from an alleged victim, he removed one priest from duty and sent him to treatment, only for the same priest to later serve as a hospital chaplain. He also wrote conciliatory letters to another priest accused of pedophilia and who once defended NAMBLA, then failed to notify the diocese to which that priest was later transferred of the accusations made against him.

=== Cardinal Law's response ===
Law's term as archbishop of Boston began in popularity but quickly declined into turbulence towards the end of his tenure. Allegations and reports of sexual misconduct by priests of the archdiocese became widespread, causing Catholics in other dioceses of the United States to investigate similar situations there. Law's actions and inactions prompted public scrutiny of all members of the United States Conference of Catholic Bishops and the steps they had taken in response to past and current allegations of sexual abuse at the hands of priests. The events in the archdiocese exploded into a national Roman Catholic Church sex abuse scandal.

Law's public statements and depositions during the abuse crisis claimed that he and the archdiocese did not initially have the expertise to understand pedophilia and ephebophilia and relied upon doctors' recommendations. In January 2002, Law stated, "I promulgated a policy to deal with sexual abuse of minors by clergy. This went into effect on January 15, 1993", and asserted that the "policy has been effective." In one 2002 deposition, Law said that his practice under the policy was to seek the advice of mental health professionals before deciding whether a priest accused of sexually abusing a child should be returned to the pulpit.

=== Impact on the diocese ===
In 2002, the archdiocese agreed to pay $10 million to Geoghan's victims and in 2003, it paid an additional $85 million to 552 victims and parents who had filed civil lawsuits over the ignored abuse. In some cases, insurance companies balked at meeting the cost of large settlements, claiming the actions were deliberate and not covered by insurance. This caused additional financial damage to the archdiocese, which already faced the need to consolidate and close parishes due to changing attendance and giving patterns.

=== Resignation of Cardinal Law ===
On December 9, 2002, over 50 archdiocesan priests published a letter declaring no confidence in Law and asking him to resign. Law submitted his resignation to Pope John Paul II, who accepted it later that month.

In a statement, Law said, "To all those who have suffered from my shortcomings and mistakes I both apologize and from them beg forgiveness."

=== Handling by Bishop Lennon ===
Bishop Richard Lennon's appointment as apostolic administrator of the archdiocese, following the resignation of Law, brought criticism from some sex-abuse victims' groups. This criticism increased after Lennon's appearance in the Frontline documentary Hand of God. The movie documents the history of a Salem, Massachusetts sex scandal and its effects on the film maker's own family. Lennon closes the Salem parish despite the fact it is not losing money for the Church. Then, when the movie's filmmaker attempts to film the administrative building where his brother reported his own sexual abuse, Lennon exits the building, shoves the camera, and declares he will not "feel bad about this" after being told why the filmmaker wants to film the building's exterior. He does not respond to the invitation to dialogue that the filmmaker's presence on the property represents, and attempts to avoid discussion of the sex scandal by refusing to talk about anything other than the Church's private property rights (i.e. trespassing). He responds to the filmmaker's claim that he doesn't care by calling the filmmaker a "sad little man."

=== Archbishop O'Malley ===
Bishop Seán Patrick O'Malley was appointed archbishop of Boston in 2003, having already dealt with sexual abuse scandals in the Diocese of Palm Beach and Diocese of Fall River.

In June 2004, the Archdiocese of Boston sold a large parcel of land near its headquarters to Boston College, in part to raise money for legal costs associated with the scandal.

In August, 2011, O'Malley released a list of 159 priests with credible accusations of child sexual abuse. Sixty-nine names were omitted from the list because the priests were deceased, were not active ministers, had not been publicly accused, or were dismissed or left the priesthood prior to canonical proceedings. The archdiocese omitted 22 names because it could not substantiate the accusations against those priests.

== Prominent cases ==
=== Reverend Joseph Birmingham ===
The first complaints against Birmingham were recorded in 1964, four years after his ordination as a priest. Birmingham was assigned as an associate priest at Our Lady of Fatima Parish in Sudbury, Massachusetts. Two families complained to the archdiocese that Birmingham was abusing their boys. After Birmingham underwent a psychiatric evaluation, the archdiocese transferred him to St. James Parish in Salem, Massachusetts, where he was placed in charge of the altar boys.

In 1970, a group of mothers from St. James met with Reverend John McCormack, pastor of St. James. They were concerned with Birmingham's relationships with their sons. McCormack told the women that the archdiocese had transferred Birmingham to St. Michael Parish in Lowell, Massachusetts, and that they should contact them with their questions.

The archdiocese in 1985 appointed Birmingham as pastor of St. Ann Parish in Gloucester, Massachusetts. Two years later, in February 1987, a boy working in the St. Ann rectory told the archdiocese that Birmingham had sexually abused him. Birmingham offered to resign, but the archdiocese sent for treatment at the Institute of the Living, a mental health facility in Hartford, Connecticut. The institute sent the archdiocese a report on March 25 on Birmingham's progress.

In April 1987, the mother of an altar boy at St. Ann wrote to Law, complaining about Birmingham's actions around her son. She asked if he was the same priest who had molested boys at St. James in the 1960s. Law wrote back "I contacted Father Birmingham. ... He assured me there is absolutely no factual basis to your concern regarding your son and him. From my knowledge of Father Birmingham and my relationship with him, I feel he would tell me the truth and I believe he is speaking the truth in this matter." Birmingham died in 1989. By 2002, 40 men alleged that they were sexually abused by Birmingham.

=== Reverend Robert V. Gale ===
The archdiocese first received complaints about Gale in 1968. During the early 1970s, while serving on the pastoral staff of Our Lady of Lourdes Parish in Boston, a complaint was received about him sexually abusing a boy. The archdiocese then transferred Gale to St. Joseph Parish in Quincy.

The archdiocese in 1979 received a letter claiming that Gale had sexually assaulted two boys at St. Joseph. Two parents also complained about him directly to Auxiliary Bishop Daniel A. Hart. They threatened to complain to the police if the archdiocese did not remove Gale from St. Joseph. He was immediately relocated to St. Jude Parish in Waltham.

Cardinal Humberto Medeiros in 1981 received a letter alleging that Gale had sexually assaulted a boy in the boiler room of St. Jude. Bowing to more parent complaints about Gale, the archdiocese removed him from St. Jude and sent him away for treatment. After he finished treatment, the archdiocese again assigned Gale to a parish, this time the Infant Jesus Parish in Brookline. The pastor there reported that Gale was staying out at night and drinking heavily.

Gale was removed from Infant Jesus in 1991 and suspended from public ministry. Law allowed Gale to live at the rectory of St. Monica Parish in South Boston. While he was there, a 17-year-old boy reported that Gale had tried to seduce him.

The archdiocese in 1996 paid a $80,000 financial settlement to a man who was raped at age 12 in 1979 by Gale, then assigned to St. Joseph in Quincy. The victim said that Gale transported him to Barnstead, New Hampshire, where Gale broke into a cabin at a closed summer camp. Gale sodomized the victim that night; the boy woke up with rectal bleeding.

The archdiocese was sued in April 2002 by another man who said that Gale tried to seduce him in 1979 when he was a boy. In August 2002, Gale was indicted on four counts of raping a minor. The assaults occurred between 1980 and 1984 at St. Jude in Waltham. The victim, who was a 10-year-old altar boy when the abuse started, said that Gale performed oral sex on him and forced him to perform the same on Gale.

Gale pleaded guilty in November 2004 to four counts of child rape of the St. Jude victim. In December 2004, Gale was sentenced to four and a half to five years in state prison. The Vatican laicized Gale in 2006.

=== Reverend John Geoghan ===
Geoghan was accused of sexual abuse involving more than 130 children. Charges were brought in Cambridge, Massachusetts alleging molestation that took place in 1991. Geoghan was laicized in 1998. In January 2002, Geoghan was found guilty of indecent assault and battery for grabbing the buttocks of a ten-year-old boy in a swimming pool at the Waltham Boys and Girls Club in 1991, and was sentenced to nine to ten years in prison.

The trial included testimony by the victim. Dr. Edward Messner, a psychiatrist who treated Geoghan for his sexual fantasies about children from 1994 to 1996 also testified, as did Archbishop Alfred C. Hughes, who testified that he banned Geoghan from the swimming club after a complaint that he had been proselytizing and had engaged in prurient conversations.

After initially agreeing to and then withdrawing a $30 million settlement with 86 of Geoghan's victims, the Boston archdiocese settled with them for $10 million, and is still negotiating with lawyers for other victims. The most recent settlement proposed is $65 million for 542 victims. The settlements are being offered in response to evidence that the archdiocese had transferred Geoghan from parish to parish despite warnings of his behavior. Evidence also arose that the archdiocese displayed a pattern of transferring other priests to new parishes when allegations of sexual abuse were made.

Geoghan was charged in two other cases in Suffolk County. One case was dropped without prejudice when the victim decided not to testify. In the second case, two rape charges were dismissed by a judge after hotly contested arguments because the statute of limitations had expired. The Commonwealth's appeal of that ruling was active at the time of Geoghan's death, and remaining charges of indecent assault in that case were pending.

In August 2003, while in protective custody at the Souza-Baranowski Correctional Center in Shirley, Geoghan was killed by his cellmate, Joseph Druce.

=== Reverend John Hanlon ===
William Wood in 1992 accused Hanlon, pastor of St. Paul Parish in Hingham, Massachusetts, of raping him multiple times during 1980 and 1981. The attacks on Wood, then an altar boy, occurred at St. Mary Church in Plymouth, at a cottage Hanlon owned in Scituate and at his ski chalet in Dover, Vermont. As soon as the allegations were announced, the archdiocese put Hanlon on administrative leave. He was indicted in June 1992.

In August 1992, the archdiocese learned of a second man who was accusing Hanlon of sexual abuse. However, the archdiocese, which was funding Hanlon's legal defense, did not notify authorities. The second man finally reported the crime to the police. In September 1993, prosecutors claimed that Hanlon raped Wood's two brothers when they were altar boys. However it was too late for them to testify in Hanlon's trial. Hanlon's first trial ended with a hung jury in October 1993.

In Hanlon's second trial, the two other Wood brothers were allowed to testify. He was convicted in March 1994 and given three life sentences in April 1994. Hanlon was ultimately accused of sexually abusing ten boys.

=== Reverend Richard J. McCormick ===
In 2002, McCormick, a Salesian Order priest, was teaching theology and literature at St. Petersburg Catholic High School in St. Petersburg, Florida. In March of that year, a female student complained to the school administration that McCormick had hugged and kissed her when they met in a hallway. McCormick and the school agreed that he should no longer serve there.

The Salesians reached financial settlements in August 2009 with three men who has accused McCormick of sexual abuse during the 1970s. The attacks occurred when the victims were teenagers attending the Salesian Junior Seminary in Goshen, New York, where McCormick was the director. Two of the victims were fondled and kissed by McCormick and a third was sexually assaulted by a relative of McCormick's. The Salesians removed McCormick from public ministry and placed him in a Salesian residence.

McCormick was indicted in August 2012 of raping a boy at a Salesian-run summer camp in Ipswich, Massachusetts, in 1981 and 1982. The victim, then age 11, said that McCormick would take him from the dormitory to his office at night, where the assault occurred. The victim was so terrified of McCormick that he would hide under a bed or under the fire escape. In March 2013, he was indicted on charges of raping an eight-year-old boy at the camp. In November 2014, McCormick was convicted of raping the first victim. He later pled guilty to raping the second boy. For both attacks, McCormick was sentenced to eight to ten years in prison. He died in prison of COVID-19 in 2020.

=== Reverend Ronald Paquin ===
In 1978, when Reverend Ronald Paquin was an associate pastor at St. Monica Parish in Methuen, Massachusetts, the church received its first report that he was molesting teenage boys. One of the victims, Robert Bartlett, complained to his pastor, who said he would take care of it. However, Paquin was not removed from St. Monica until December 1980.

The archdiocese then assigned Paquin in April 1981 to St. John the Baptist Parish in Haverhill, Massachusetts. In November 1981, Paquin drove Jimmy Francis and three younger boys to a ski chalet in Bethlehem, New Hampshire. According to witnesses, Paquin and the boys drank liquor into the early morning and one boy slept with Paquin. Driving home the next day, Paquin fell asleep at the wheel and caused the vehicle to crash, killing Francis.

When Reverend Frederick E. Sweeney was appointed as the new pastor of St. John in 1989, he immediately heard complaints from parishioners about Paquin. Sweeney went to Auxiliary Bishop Alfred C. Hughes, who told him he needed to find a complainant before the archdiocese would take action. After finding a victim, Sweeny and the man met with Reverend John B. McCormack. After the man detailed Paquin's abuses, McCormack just asked the man how much money he wanted. The victim said he only wanted Paquin removed from the parish and threatened to talk to the newspapers if the archdiocese did nothing. Within a few weeks, the archdiocese sent Paquin to the Saint Luke Institute, a center for treating priests in Silver Spring, Maryland.

Four months later, Paquin returned to Massachusetts and was assigned as a chaplain at Bon Secours Hospital in Methuen. In 1992, a male employee at the hospital complained to the archdiocese about inappropriate sexual behavior by Paquin. In March 1997, an archdiocesan review board suggested that the Vatican laicize Paquin. However, it changed its recommendation in May 1997 to allow him to continue as a priest and serve as a chaplain. By 1998, the archdiocese had paid over $500,000 in settlements to victims of sexual abuse by Paquin. Law appointed Paquin as chaplain at Youville Hospital in Cambridge. The archdiocese suspended Paquin from public ministry permanently in 2000.

In January 2003, Paquin pleaded guilty in Salem Superior Court in Massachusetts to raping an altar boy from Haverhill and was sentenced to 12 to 15 years in prison. While he was still in prison, the Vatican laicized Paquin. He was released from prison in Massachusetts in 2015.

Keith Townsend, another former altar boy from Haverhill, accused Paquin of raping him and other boys in Kennebunk, Maine, during the mid-1980s. Townsend said that Paquin would drive the boys to a motel and a trailer he owned, plying the boys with alcohol and assaulting them. Paquin was convicted at York County Court in Maine in November 2018 on 11 counts of sexual abuse. He was sentenced in May 2019 to 16 years in state prison. The judge remarked that he did not detect any expression of remorse by Paquin in his statement before sentencing.

=== Paul Shanley ===
According to Leon Podles in his book Sacrilege: Sexual Abuse in the Catholic Church, "In late 1993, Shanley was sent to the Institute of Living in Hartford, Connecticut, for evaluation. The Boston archdiocese has refused to release this evaluation, but other released files show that Shanley admitted to nine sexual encounters, of which four involved boys, and that he was diagnosed as "narcissistic" and "histrionic." Shanley admitted that he was "attracted to adolescents" and on the basis of this confession, the Boston archdiocese secretly settled several lawsuits against Shanley. The archdiocese in 1993 had to admit to the Diocese of San Bernardino part of the truth about Shanley, and the bishop of San Bernardino immediately dismissed him."

In February 2005, Shanley was found guilty of indecent assaults and the rape of a male minor and received a sentence of 12 to 15 years in prison. Shanley's case remains controversial to some because the allegations of abuse came only after the victim (now an adult) alleged that he recovered memories of the abuse from approximately 20 years earlier. The manner in which the accusations against Shanley arose and enormous attention in the media also have given rise to questions about the validity of the convictions.

Shanley was released from Old Colony Correctional Center in Bridgewater on July 28, 2017, after completing the required 12 years of his sentence. On October 28, 2020, Shanley died at the age of 89.

=== James Talbot ===
Reverend James Talbot, who taught and coached at Boston College High School, was among those charged. He had been removed from ministry in 1998 after allegations surfaced that he had molested a student at Cheverus High School in Portland, Maine. In 2005, Talbot pleaded guilty to rape, assault with intent to rape, and three counts of assault and battery, related to two students he sexually abused during his time at Boston College High School and was handed a five- to seven-year prison sentence. He was released in 2011. On September 24, 2018, Talbot pled guilty to the sex abuse charges in Maine and immediately began serving a three-year prison sentence.

=== Reverend Robert A. Ward ===
In 1999, after completing a drug treatment program, the archdiocese assigned Reverend Robert A. Ward as pastor of Holy Ghost Parish in Whitman, Massachusetts. Two weeks later, while fixing Ward's computer, a technician discovered child pornography files. Ward admitted to the church hierarchy of previously downloading such images; Law removed him from Holy Ghost and banned him from any contact with children. The archdiocese did not report Ward to law enforcement. The sexual abuse review board for the archdiocese ruled that possessing child pornography was a "victimless crime" and in 2001 Law assigned Ward to the archdiocesan development office.

In February 2002, a man accused Ward of sexually molesting him in 1970 when he was an altar boy at Presentation Parish in Boston. Investigation showed that the archdiocese knew that Ward was using cocaine least as early as 1995. Ward was suspended from public ministry by the archdiocese that same month and was laicized by the Vatican in 2005.
