= Nathan Carlow =

American Republican politician from Maine

Member of the Maine House of Representatives
- Incumbent
- Assumed office December 7, 2022
- Preceded by: Meldon Carmichael
- Constituency: 137th district
- In office December 2, 2020 – December 7, 2022
- Preceded by: Donald Marean
- Succeeded by: Nina Milliken
- Constituency: 16th district

Personal details
- Born: May 18, 1999 (age 27)
- Party: Republican
- Education: University of Southern Maine
- Profession: Accountant, politician
- Website: Campaign website

Nathan Michael Carlow is an American Republican politician and state legislator from Maine. Carlow represents Maine House District 137, including the towns of Hollis and Buxton. During his first term from 2020-2022, Carlow was the youngest member of the Maine House.

== Early life and education ==
Carlow was born on 18 May 1999. When he was an infant, Carlow's father died by suicide. Carlow is a graduate of Bonny Eagle High School, and was first elected to the Maine School Administrative District 6 Board of Directors while he was still a student there.

Carlow studied political science at the University of Southern Maine and was elected to the Maine House while attending.

== Maine House ==
Carlow first ran for the Maine House in 2020, filling a seat vacated by Donald Marean, who had termed out. He defeated veteran Republican Stavros Mendros in the primary 58%-42% and Democrat David Durrell in the November general election 52%-48%. Carlow was the youngest legislator ever elected in Maine.

Carlow was the author of a bipartisan letter signed by more than 50 other legislators which asked Maine officials to ease restrictions in schools implemented to slow the spread of COVID-19.

On June 9, 2021, the Maine House unanimously approved legislation Carlow introduced titled An Act Authorizing an Increase to the Maximum Annual Fund Balance for Public School Districts. The bill was unanimously approved by the Maine Senate on June 10, 2021, and was signed into law by Governor Janet Mills on June 15, 2021. In a statement to the Legislature's Joint Committee on Education and Cultural Affairs, Carlow said that the bill would help public school districts in Maine save money to use for voter approved expenses, Carlow further said the legislation would provide those districts with an additional tool to lower property taxes.

== Personal life and community service ==
Carlow lives in Buxton and continues to serve on the Maine School Administrative District 6 Board of Directors as its Chairperson and former Vice Chairperson and Chairperson of the 2022 Superintendent Search Committee. He works as an accountant, and is the Secretary/Director of Public Relations of the Portland Kiwanis Club, Chairperson of the Buxton Republican Committee, and a former USM student representative to the University of Maine System Board of Trustees, and the Board of the Maine Association for Middle Level Education.

== Electoral history ==
2020 Maine House District 16 Republican Primary
Party	Candidate	Votes	%
Republican	Nathan Carlow	457	57.8%
Republican	Stavros Mendros	334	42.2%
Total votes		791	100.0%

2020 Maine House District 16 General Election
Party	Candidate	Votes	%
Republican	Nathan Carlow	3,173	51.8%
Democratic	David Durrell	2,954	48.2%
Total votes		6,127	100.0%

2022 Maine House District 137 General Election
Party	Candidate	Votes	%
Republican	Nathan Carlow	2,757	57.3%
Democratic	Robert Faucher	2,053	42.7%
Total votes		4,810	100.0%
