= John Geoghan =

American child rapist and priest (1935–2003)

- Born: June 4, 1935; Boston, Massachusetts, U.S.
- Died: August 23, 2003 (aged 68); Souza-Baranowski Correctional Center, Shirley, Massachusetts, U.S.
- Cause of death: Homicide by blunt force trauma and strangulation
- Occupation: Former priest
- Known for: Boston clergy sex abuse scandal
- Convictions: Indecent assault and battery
- Penalty: 9 to 10 years imprisonment

Ecclesiastical career
- Church: Catholic Church
- Ordained: 1962
- Laicized: 1998
- Congregations: Various, Archdiocese of Boston

John Joseph Geoghan (/ˈɡeɪɡən/ GAY-gən; June 4, 1935 – August 23, 2003) was an American serial child rapist and Catholic priest assigned to parishes in the Archdiocese of Boston in Massachusetts. He was reassigned to several parish posts involving interaction with children, even after receiving treatment for pedophilia.

The investigation and prosecution of Geoghan comprised one of the numerous cases of priests accused of child sexual abuse in a scandal that rocked the archdiocese in the 1990s and 2000s and led to the resignation of Boston's archbishop Cardinal Bernard Francis Law, on December 13, 2002. Law lost the support of fellow clergy and the laity after it was shown that his response to allegations against dozens of priests consisted of assigning them to different parishes, thus allowing the sexual abuse of additional children to take place.

Geoghan was convicted of sexual abuse, laicized and sentenced in 2002 to nine to ten years in Souza-Baranowski Correctional Center, a maximum security prison. Less than a year later, he was murdered there by Joseph Druce, an inmate serving a life sentence. The Boston Globe's coverage of Geoghan's abuse opened the door for public knowledge of the sexual abuse scandal in the Catholic archdiocese of Boston and Catholic churches nationwide in general. This coverage is a key plot element of Tom McCarthy's film Spotlight (2015).

== Early life ==
John Joseph Geoghan was born in Boston on June 4, 1935, to an Irish Catholic family. He lost his father when he was five years old and was subsequently raised by his maternal uncle, Mark Keohane, who was a Catholic priest within the archdiocese of Boston. Geoghan attended local parochial schools. Intending to become a priest after his father's death, he attended Cardinal O'Connell Seminary. An assessment in 1954 noted he had a "very pronounced immaturity". He graduated in 1962 and was ordained.

== Career ==
On February 13, 1962, Geoghan was assigned as an assistant pastor at Blessed Sacrament Parish in Saugus, Massachusetts. That December, he talked a man out of committing suicide by jumping off the Mystic River Bridge. While Geoghan was assigned to Blessed Sacrament, Rev. Anthony Benzevich allegedly told church officials that the junior priest was observed bringing boys into his bedroom. Benzevich would later deny the allegation. In 1998, Benzevich told reporters he was branded as a troublemaker for reporting Geoghan and that church officials hinted he might be sent to Peru if he persisted. In 1995, Geoghan admitted to having molested four boys during his tenure at Blessed Sacrament.

Geoghan was assigned to St. Bernard's Parish in Concord starting on September 22, 1966. He was transferred after seven months there; church records offered no explanation for his reassignment. On April 20, 1967, Geoghan was assigned to St. Paul's Parish in Hingham. Around 1968, a man complained to church authorities that he had caught Geoghan molesting his son. As a result, Geoghan was sent to the Seton Institute in Baltimore, Maryland, for treatment for his pedophilia. In the early 1970s, parishioner Joanne Mueller accused Geoghan of molesting her four young sons. Mueller has said that she informed Paul E. Miceli and he asked her to keep quiet. Miceli disputes her account. The church later reached a settlement with Mueller.

Geoghan's next assignment was at St. Andrew's Parish in Boston's Jamaica Plain neighborhood, starting on June 4, 1974. On February 9, 1980, John E. Thomas told Bishop Thomas Vose Daily that Geoghan admitted to molesting seven boys. Daily called Geoghan and told him to go home. Geoghan admitted to the abuse but said that he did "not feel it serious or a pastoral problem." He was placed on sick leave three days later and ordered by Cardinal Humberto Medeiros to undergo counseling. Under the care of Drs. Robert Mullins and John H. Brennan, Geoghan underwent psychoanalysis and psychotherapy.

On February 25, 1981, Geoghan returned to pastoral work at St. Brendan's Parish in Dorchester. While there, he allegedly raped and fondled a boy. In 1982, the family of seven of Geoghan's victims complained to Bishop Daily that Geoghan had arranged to meet one of his victims at an ice cream shop in Jamaica Plain and was at the time in the company of another boy. On September 18, 1984, Cardinal Bernard Francis Law, the new Archbishop of Boston, removed Geoghan from the parish after complaints that he was molesting children.

Law assigned Geoghan to St. Julia's Parish in Weston on November 13, 1984. Geoghan was put in charge of three youth groups, including altar boys. On December 7, Auxiliary Bishop John Michael D'Arcy wrote to Law complaining about Geoghan's assignment to St. Julia's because of Geoghan's "history of homosexual involvement with young boys". That same month, Mullins wrote that Geoghan had "fully recovered", and Brennan stated that there was no need for restrictions on his work as a priest.

In 1986, new allegations of sexual abuse were made against Geoghan. From April 3 to 12, 1989, he was treated at Saint Luke Institute in Silver Spring, Maryland, where he was diagnosed with homosexual pedophilia. On April 28, 1989, auxiliary bishop Robert Joseph Banks ordered Geoghan to leave the ministry. Instead, Geoghan was placed on sick leave on May 24 and from August 10 to November 4 was treated at the Institute of Living in Hartford, Connecticut. Upon his release, Geoghan was described as "moderately improved". Institute officials recommended that he return to assignment. Banks was concerned about the conclusions of the institute's discharge summary. On December 13, the institute sent Banks a letter explaining the discharge summary, stating that "The probability he [Geoghan] would act out again is quite low. However, we could not guarantee that it would not re-occur." Psychiatrists concluded that Geoghan had "atypical pedophilia in remission" and a "mixed personality disorder with obsessive-compulsive, histrionic and narcissistic features" but decided he could be safely reassigned.

On November 28, 1990, Banks recommended that Geoghan return to the parish but left the decision up to Cardinal Law and another bishop. On October 23, 1991, the church received a complaint about Geoghan's "proselytizing" with a boy at a pool.

== Retirement ==
In 1993, Geoghan retired from active ministry at the age of 58. He moved into the Regina Cleri residence for retired priests. Three years later, after more allegations surfaced against him, he spent several months in therapy in the Southdown Institute in Ontario, Canada.

== Sexual abuse charges ==
During a 30-year career in six parishes, Geoghan was accused of sexual abuse involving more than 130 boys. He was prosecuted in Cambridge on charges of molestation that took place in 1991. Geoghan was defrocked in 1998 by Pope John Paul II. He was found guilty on February 21, 2002, of indecent assault and battery for grabbing the buttocks of a 10-year-old boy in a swimming pool at the Waltham Boys and Girls Club in 1991, and was sentenced to nine to ten years in prison.

After initially agreeing to a $30-million settlement with 86 of Geoghan's victims, the Boston archdiocese pulled out of it, finally settling with them for $10 million.

Boston's Suffolk County prosecuted Geoghan in two other sexual abuse cases. One case was dropped without prejudice when the alleged victim decided not to testify. In the second case, a judge dismissed the conviction of Geoghan in two rapes after hotly contested arguments, because the statute of limitations had run out. The commonwealth's appeal of that ruling was active at the time of Geoghan's death. The remaining charges of indecent assault in that case were still pending prosecution.

== Murder ==
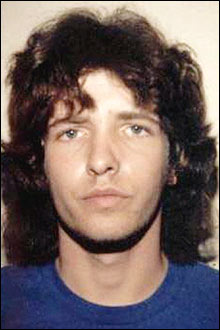
Druce in a 1986 mug shot

On August 23, 2003, while in protective custody at the maximum security Souza-Baranowski Correctional Center in Lancaster, Geoghan was strangled and stomped to death in his cell by inmate Joseph Lee Druce (born Darrin Ernest Smiledge; April 15, 1965). Druce was serving a sentence of life without the possibility of parole since 1989 for killing a man who allegedly made sexual advances toward him.

Geoghan was trapped in his cell by Druce, who jammed the door closed so correction officers could not reach him. Druce then strangled and stomped Geoghan to death. An autopsy revealed Geoghan's cause of death to be "ligature strangulation and blunt chest trauma".

Druce was said to have planned the murder of Geoghan for more than a month, considering him a "prize". Druce had been sexually abused in a boarding school as a child. Also, because Geoghan had taught another inmate how to sexually abuse children, Druce's crimes were partly due to the fact that he felt he had to take revenge on all child sexual abusers. The press raised questions about prison officials' judgment in placing the two men in the same unit for protective custody. In addition, prison officials had been warned by an inmate that Druce intended to attack Geoghan. It was noted that while two officers are normally stationed in the unit where Geoghan and Druce were being held, there was only one officer in the unit at the time because one had left temporarily to escort another inmate to a medical station. Union officials had noted previous staffing cuts at the prison, which they felt led to the prison being a more dangerous and volatile place. It has also been suggested Druce had been offered money to kill Geoghan or that Druce thought he would gain prestige from fellow prisoners for doing so.

A Worcester jury found Druce guilty of first-degree murder on January 25, 2006, after the jury rejected his insanity defense. During the trial, Druce was seen with a black eye he received from an individual who surprised him in his cell. The man who had surprised Druce was reported to have been wearing correction officers' pants, suggesting a reprisal by prison staff for the embarrassment surrounding Geoghan's murder. Druce was sentenced a second time to life in prison without the possibility of parole.

In June 2007, The Boston Herald received a handwritten letter signed "Joseph Lee Druce", stating "The truth about Officer involvement in John Geogan's (sic) death", along with an address for a YouTube video. The address contained a video taken by security cameras inside Souza-Baranowski Correctional Center, made during the murder. The 10-minute video shows the attempts made by correction officers to open the cell door (as many as five pulling at one time), along with videos showing resuscitation emergency personnel's efforts on Geoghan. Inmates at Souza-Baranowski do not have internet access. Department of Correction officials investigated who posted the video, as it was from an internal security camera.

Geoghan was buried at Holyhood Cemetery in Brookline, Massachusetts, on August 28, 2003.

== Effects of the Geoghan case on other church leaders ==
=== Robert Joseph Banks ===
Robert Joseph Banks, then an auxiliary bishop in Boston, had recommended in 1989 that Geoghan remain as a parish priest despite receiving an assessment that he would likely continue to act on his pedophilia. Banks was appointed bishop of the Diocese of Green Bay in 1990. He retired in 2003, having reached the church's mandatory retirement age of 75 years. Banks remained Bishop Emeritus of Green Bay until his death in 2026.

=== John Michael D'Arcy ===
John Michael D'Arcy, who had written an unheeded letter of warning to Cardinal Law about Geoghan's behavior, was transferred from Boston to Indiana on February 26, 1985, and ended his career as bishop of the Diocese of Fort Wayne–South Bend. D'Arcy retired in 2009 and died in 2013.

=== Bernard Francis Law ===
After Cardinal Law resigned as Boston's archbishop in December 2002, he relocated to Rome in 2004 where he served as archpriest of the Basilica of St. Mary Major, the largest Catholic Marian church in Rome. It was "commonly believed that he would live out his retirement in Rome" after he retired at age 80 in 2011. Law died in Rome on December 20, 2017.

== In popular culture ==
Canadian punk-rock band Billy Talent's song "Devil in a Midnight Mass" from the album Billy Talent II (2006) addresses Geoghan's story from a victim's perspective. Bob Rivers recorded a parody of "Keep Your Hands to Yourself", originally by the Georgia Satellites, about Geoghan.

The 2015 film Spotlight depicts the Boston Globe investigation into the Boston Archdiocese, spurred by Geoghan's trial that would lead to his eventual imprisonment. Geoghan is briefly depicted in the film in a scene taking place in 1976 at a Boston police station, played by an uncredited actor.

== See also ==
- Catholic Church sexual abuse cases
- Crimen sollicitationis
- Pontifical secret
- Deliver Us from Evil (2006 film)
- Sex Crimes and the Vatican (Panorama documentary episode)
- Barbara Blaine, founder of the Survivors Network of those Abused by Priests
- John Jay Report
- Gregory Sutton
- List of anti-sex offender attacks in the United States
