= Catholic catechism =

Catholic catechism may refer to:

- Roman Catechism, 1566
- The Catholic Catechism (Hardon), 1975
- Catechism of the Catholic Church and its derived works

== See also ==
- Catechism
