= Bonny Eagle High School =

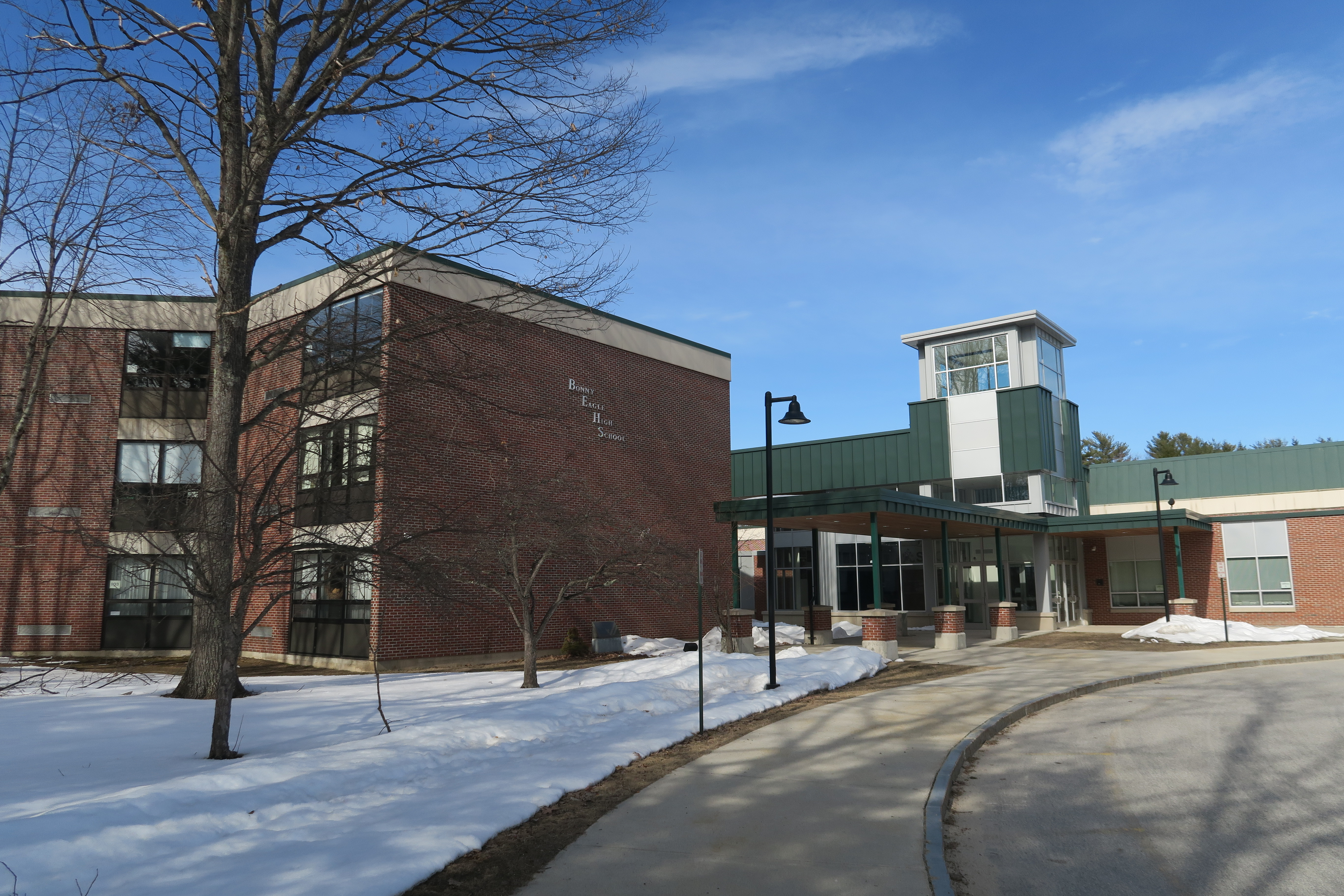
- Bonny Eagle High School

Location
- 700 Saco Road; Standish, Maine 04084; United States
- Coordinates: 43°41′49″N 70°35′56″W

Information
- Type: Public secondary
- Established: 1961
- School district: M.S.A.D. 6
- Principal: Theodore Finn
- Teaching staff: 82.60 (FTE)
- Grades: 9–12
- Enrollment: 1,047 (2023-2024)
- Student to teacher ratio: 12.68
- Color
- Mascot: Scot
- Accreditation: New England Association of Schools and Colleges
- Website: bonnyeagle.org

Bonny Eagle High School is a public high school located in Standish, Maine, United States. The school is a part of Maine School Administrative District 6, which serves the towns of Buxton (including Bar Mills), Hollis, Limington, Frye Island, and Standish (including Steep Falls).

== Sports and interscholastic activities ==
Bonny Eagle High School offers a variety of sports teams including Cross Country, Football, Soccer, Cheerleading, Field Hockey, Golf, Indoor and Outdoor Track, Basketball, Wrestling, Ice Hockey, Swimming, Softball, Baseball, Tennis, and Volleyball. The football program has won 7 state championships since 2000, capturing the Class A Maine State Championships in 2004, 2005, 2007, 2008, 2013, 2016, and 2019. The team was undefeated in the 2004, 2007, and 2016 seasons.

== Notable alumni ==
- Mike Brown — mixed martial arts fighter
- Nathan Carlow — politician
- Jeff Neal — drummer and vocalist
- Alan Taylor — historian
- Emily Durgin — professional distance runner for Adidas
