= Zanco Tiny T1 =

Mobile phone model

- Manufacturer: Zini Mobiles
- Type: Mobile phone
- Successor: Zanco Tiny T2
- Dimensions: 46.7 mm × 21 mm × 12 mm (1.84 in × 0.83 in × 0.47 in)
- Weight: 13 g (0.46 oz)
- Memory: Built-in 32 MB
- Battery: 200 mAh
- Display: 64x32 px
- Data inputs: Alphanumeric keypad
- Made in: China

Zanco Tiny T1 is a cellphone, which is considered to be the smallest in the world. It was launched in 2018 by Zini Mobiles. It was succeeded by the Zanco Tiny T2 in 2020.

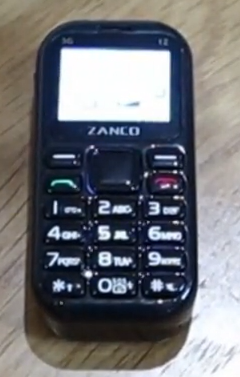
Zanco Tiny T2, successor of the Zanco Tiny T1.

== Overview ==
Zanco Tiny T1 was created as a joke, and it took two years to be developed. Zini Mobiles launched a Kickstarter campaign for mass production in 2017, with the official release happening in May 2018.

Zanco Tiny T1 measures 46.7mm x 21mm x 12mm and weights 13 grams. It can only make phone calls and send SMS messages. Its OLED screen of 0.49 inches has a resolution of 64x32 pixels and it has 2G and Bluetooth connection. The cellphone is compatible with a nano SIM card, with a RAM memory of 32 MB and storage of 32 MB. It is capable of storing up until 300 contacts and the last 50 calls and messages. The battery of 200 mAh can last up to three days in standby or 3 hours talking.

The Zanco Tiny T1 is among the most frequently smuggled devices in UK prisons.
