= John Hardon =

American Catholic priest and theologian

Servant of God John Anthony Hardon SJ
- Born: June 18, 1914; Midland, Pennsylvania, U.S.
- Died: December 30, 2000 (aged 86); Clarkston, Michigan, U.S.

John Anthony Hardon (June 18, 1914 – December 30, 2000) was an American Jesuit priest, writer, teacher and theologian. As a beatification process was opened for him in 2005, he is recognized by the Catholic Church as a Servant of God.

== Early life ==
John Hardon was born on June 18, 1914, to John and Anna Hardon in Midland, Pennsylvania. When he was a year old, John Hardon Sr. died in an industrial accident. After the accident, Hardon was raised by his 26-year-old mother Anna (née Jevin) Hardon. The two moved to Cleveland, Ohio.

A devout Catholic, Anna Hardon never remarried "out of concern for the influence a possible stepfather might have on her son's vocation." John Janaro, a Hardon biographer, described Anna as "a woman of deep faith, a Franciscan tertiary who embraced her poverty and her difficult circumstances with courage and grace". Anna "attended daily Mass and received Holy Communion" and her home "had sacred pictures, a family holy water font, and a good deal of spiritual conversation". Hardon later recalled that they only spoke Slav at home. He contrasted it to English which he believed was "the worst language in the world to try to talk Catholicism in."

Hardon was Anna's only child, and she supported him by cleaning offices in Cleveland, often working nights. Janaro reports that as a child Hardon was "willful and self-possessed; he was determined that no one was going to tell him what to do"; but he was soon affected by his mother's example. Hardon would often recall that his mother told him that the very purpose of knees "are for kneeling to pray before God".

For added income Anna took in two young Lutheran girls as boarders, who lived with the family for at least eight years. At one point, the three-year-old Hardon protested at having to abstain from meat on Friday, unlike "sisters". To solve the problem, Anna asked the girls "My boy is growing up: he's asking embarrassing questions. Would you mind either abstaining from eating meat on Friday or find yourselves somewhere else to board?" The girls choose to join the Friday fast with permission from their minister. Hardon's positive relationships with the two girls helped form his later religious thinking: "Years before the Ecumenical Movement I had come to respect and cherish Protestants."

At age six, John Hardon received religious instruction from a Sister Benedicta. She told her students "Whatever you ask Our Lord on your First Communion day, you will receive." Hardon later said that his first communion request was, "Make me a priest." Hardon then started attending daily mass with his mother. At age eight, he received his confirmation. Hardon later said that he called on the Holy Spirit to give him "the grace of martyrdom."

=== Early schooling ===
Hardon received his primary education at St. Wendelin School in Cleveland. During a Church History class in eighth grade, Hardon became impressed with the Jesuit order. He learned about Saint Peter Canisius, a 16th-century Dutch Jesuit priest who preached against the Protestant Reformation in Germany. Hardon then attended Cathedral Latin High School in Cleveland, operated by the Brothers of Mary.

Unwilling to leave Anna on her own, Hardon decided not to pursue the priesthood immediately after high school. Instead, "with the help of savings his mother had put aside specifically for his future", he attended John Carroll University in Cleveland. He decided then to become a medical doctor; however, he later said that the Jesuit charism had a "profound impact" on him:

There was a certain strength about the Jesuits, a "manliness" that John had never experienced at home because he never knew his father. Also their mental discipline impressed him; it motivated him to major in philosophy and it began to shape his approach to spirituality through the direction of LeMay, a brilliant and discerning man who saw in John great potential.

In his third year at John Carroll, under LeMay's guidance, Hardon decided to enter the priesthood. He changed his course of studies to include Latin, philosophy, and college theology, earning his Bachelor of Arts degree in 1936.

=== Entering the Jesuits ===
Although he wished to join the Jesuits, Hardon felt a duty to look after his increasingly ill mother. He again considered abandoning the priesthood and marrying a childhood friend. Hardon applied and was accepted to the medical school at Ohio State University in Columbus, Ohio. LeMay insisted to Hardon that he "did indeed have a priestly vocation". Anna also told him "the very same God who was calling him would guard every hair on his mother's head," and "if the reason he was going to marry was so that she would not be alone without anyone to care for her, he was not to be concerned." Finally convinced that the priesthood was the right choice, Hardon entered the Society of Jesus as a novice on September 1, 1936.

Hardon later confessed to LeMay that he felt he had abandoned his mother. LeMay told him "John, you belong in the Society of Jesus. What you are experiencing is a temptation. Put it out of your mind." Hardon continued regularly to correspond with his mother but to avoid temptation, he avoided visiting her for seven years until ordered to do so by his superior.

== Priesthood ==
=== Studies ===
As a Jesuit novice, Hardon studied at West Baden College in West Baden Springs, Indiana. He published his first article in 1941 on the study of Latin. He obtained a Master of Philosophy degree at Loyola University Chicago in 1941. On June 18, 1947, Hardon was ordained to the priesthood. His mother attended the ordination, along with the now grown up girls from his childhood. Anna Hardon died in 1948.

In 1949, the Jesuits sent Hardon to Rome to attend the Pontifical Gregorian University. While at the Gregorian, he was appointed director of the graduate library. His superiors tasked him with retrieving from borrowers a number of library books that the Vatican had recently declared as heretical. He recalled:

Before I had retrieved one-half of the heretical books, I had become the agent of orthodoxy and therefore the sworn enemy of the modernists, who were updating the Catholic faith to its modernist theology. I had doors slammed in my face. I lost friends whom I had considered believers [...] [this experience] taught me that the faith I had so casually learned could be preserved only by the price of a living martyrdom. This faith, I was to find out, is a precious treasure that cannot be preserved except at a heavy price. The price is nothing less than to confess what so many others either openly or covertly denied.

Hardon earned his Doctor of Sacred Theology degree from the Gregorian in 1951 with a dissertation on St. Robert Bellarmine: A Comparative Study of Bellarmine's Doctrine on the Relation of Sincere Non-Catholics to the Catholic Church. That same year, Hardon received a papal medal.

=== Teaching ===
After receiving his doctorate in 1951, Hardon petitioned the Jesuits to send him to Japan as a missionary. However, due to his chronic asthma, the Jesuits instead assigned him to the faculty of West Baden College, teaching theology to Jesuit students. He pronounced his final vows to the Jesuits on February 2, 1953, including the Fourth vow to the pope.

Interested in other faiths, Hardon began to study comparative religion. In eastern religions, he found "not only areas that were compatible with Christianity but also sections of thought that were clearly influenced in a direct manner by contact with the Christian message." He began using his extensive knowledge of Asian customs and religions to train missionaries for Asia.

While still teaching full-time at West Baden, several Protestant schools invited him to their campuses as a visiting professor. They included Bethany Theological Seminary in Richmond, Indiana, the Lutheran School of Theology at Chicago, and Seabury-Western Theological Seminary in Evanston, Illinois. According to author Paul Likoudis,

In this work he saw an opportunity to share the fullness of the faith with those baptized in Christ who, because of the circumstances of history, time and place, or culture, had yet to receive a complete understanding and appreciation of the Christian faith and of the Church that extends the power and presence of Jesus Christ.

When Hardon became a visiting professor at Seabury-Western, the Anglican Archbishop of Canterbury in England sent a personal representative to the seminary to mark "the first time in history an Anglican/Episcopalian seminary had appointed a teacher who was a member of the once hated and feared Society of Jesus."

In 1962, Hardon joined Western Michigan University in Kalamazoo, Michigan, to teach Roman Catholicism and Comparative Religion. Five years later, in 1967, he returned to Illinois to teach Jesuit scholastics at two Jesuit theological schools. He also served as a visiting professor at St. Paul University in Ottawa, Ontario where he taught furloughed missionaries classes in missiology.

Hardon provided advice on liturgy to the participants in the mid-1960s to the Second Vatican Council in Rome. Hardon sympathized with Catholics who objected to some Council reforms, "but he never for a moment accepted the premise that a schismatic act was ever justified." He later worked for the Congregations for the Clergy in Rome to implement these reforms.

In 1974, Hardon was appointed as a professor at St. John's University in New York City at the Institute for Advanced Studies in Catholic Doctrine. He worked with the Sisters of Notre Dame of Chardon, Ohio to write Christ Our Life, a series of religious textbooks for elementary students.

=== Publishing ===
Hardon wrote over forty books on religion and theology. His book Protestant Churches in America (1956) received critical acclaim in both Catholic and Protestant circles. It was followed by Religions of the World (1963).

Hardon's most notable publication was Catholic Catechism: A Contemporary Catechism of the Catholic Church (1975). Paul VI was displeased with doctrinal errors in the controversial Dutch Catechism, published in 1966. In line with his letter Solemni Hac Liturgia (Credo of the people of God), the pope requested that Hardon produce a new English catechism. By the time of Hardon's death in 2000, The Catholic Catechism had sold over one million copies.

Hardon published the Modern Catholic Dictionary (1980), a Catholic reference work. He also contributed articles to six encyclopedias. Hardon also wrote articles for Catholic newspapers and magazines and served as executive editor of The Catholic Faith magazine.

=== Establishments ===
In 1969, Hardon helped found the Consortium Perfectae Caritatis, a group of conservative American nuns who broke away from the Leadership Conference of Women Religious (LCWR). In 1971, Pope Paul VI asked Abbot Ugo Modotti to increase Catholic evangelism through print, film, radio and television. Hardon told an interviewer in 2003 that, [date inconsistent - Hardon died in 2000]

"...the Holy Father's mission was very clear: American Catholics must get some control of the media of social communication; otherwise, the pope feared for the survival of the Church in our country."

Modotti enlisted Hardon and several other American clerics in this social communication initiative. Two weeks before Modotti died, he asked the pope to put Hardon in charge of it.

In 1972, Hardon founded Mark Communication in Canada and later the Pontifical Catechetical Institutes in the United States, to train religious educators. He also assisted those establishing similar organizations. Hardon in 1974 co-founded the Institute on Religious Life, an apostolate dedicated to increasing the number of men and women in religious orders.

Hardon founded several Catholic organizations, including Inter Mirifica (a name taken from Vatican II's decree on social communication) and Holy Trinity Apostolate in Sterling Heights, Michigan He also served as an adviser to many Catholic organizations, including Catholics United for Faith, an international lay organization to promote evangelism.

In the early 1980s, Pope John Paul II instructed Mother Teresa of Calcutta to have the Missionaries of Charity, her order religious order, evangelize the poor. Cardinal Josef Ratzinger asked Hardon to instruct the sisters on evangelism. Hardon wrote a catechetical course for the Missionaries. Hardon later adapted the Missionaries course into a series of home study courses for lay Catholics. In 1985, Hardon founded the Marian Catechist Apostolate, which uses these home study courses to prepare lay people for catechetical ministry.

Beginning in 1988, Hardon started recording lectures with Eternal Life of Bardstown, Kentucky. Due to his halting voice, Eternal Life digitally remastered Hardon's recordings. Lecture topics included the Ignatian Exercises, the Apostles' Creed, the Eucharist, Catholic Sexual Morality, and Angels and Devils. Hardon's first lecture series was about artificial contraception. Hardon viewed it as having "greased the skids for the culture of death". By that, Hardon believed that it was the source for public acceptance of abortion rights for women and assisted suicide.

In 1996, Hardon helped establish the first Call to Holiness conference near Detroit.

== Personal customs ==
Hardon spent his last years working from an office on the grounds of the Assumption Grotto in Detroit, serving as a spiritual director. Hardon kept to a demanding work schedule, especially while assisting the 1992 Catechism. During the day, he performed his duties as spiritual director. He would spend at least three hours a day in Eucharistic adoration. By early evening, Hardon would be writing and organizing material well into the night. He frequently received night time calls from Ratzinger about the Catechism.

Hardon's health problems continued throughout his life. In 1981 he had coronary artery bypass surgery.

== Death ==
After suffering from several illnesses, Hardon died from bone cancer at the Jesuits' Colombiere Center in Clarkston, Michigan on December 30, 2000. William J. Smith reported that in his final weeks, Hardon "suffered tremendous physical pain, but he made himself "a true victim soul.'" He bequeathed his extensive library and correspondence to Archbishop Raymond Burke. Each year, Catholics in the Detroit area celebrate a memorial mass for Hardon on December 30.

== Controversy ==
=== McGuire investigation ===
During the 1990s, Hardon became involved in the case of Fr Donald McGuire, a Jesuit priest who was later sent to prison on sexual assault charges. A prominent priest in San Francisco, McGuire was known for running retreats for wealthy Catholics. He had also faced accusations of sexual abuse over several decades. In 1993, the Jesuits removed McGuire from public ministry after they received accusations of him sexually abusing a boy. According to Peter Jamison of the San Francisco Weekly, the Jesuits sent Hardon to San Francisco to ask McGuire about the allegations.

Speaking with Hardon, McGuire admitted sharing a room with the boy during a trip. McGuire said he showered with him, asked him for a massage and had pornography in the room. However, McGuire denied touching the boy's genitals and watching him masturbate. After his interview with McGuire, Hardon sent a report to Fr Bradley Schaeffer, the local Jesuit provincial. In one excerpt, Hardon said:

Regarding showering, Fr. Don said that it was true, but the picture is not one of a lingering sensual experience. It was rather the picture of two firemen, responding to an emergency, one of whom was seriously handicapped and in need of support and care from the other...

Regarding the massages, Fr. Don said they were done with attention to modesty and were necessary to relieve spasm at the 4th-5th lumbar disc [above the buttocks] and the right leg, involving the sciatic nerve... Regarding pornography Fr. Don said that there were Playboy and Penthouse magazines, which he neither got nor threw away... I do not believe there was any conscious and deliberate sexual perversity...

I do believe Fr. McGuire was acting on principles which, though objectively defensible, were highly imprudent… He should be prudently allowed to engage in priestly ministry.

On February 2, 1994, Mother Teresa, a longtime colleague of McGuire, wrote to Schaeffer, saying that she believed McGuire was innocent of sex abuse allegations. In her letter, she said that Hardon "had established Father's innocence of the allegations against him. Hardon said that McGuire admitted imprudence in his behavior." The Jesuits allowed McGuire to resume his ministry. After more reports of child abuse, the Jesuits dismissed McGuire from their order in 2007. He was convicted of child rape in 2009 and sentenced to 35 years in prison.

Writing for Catholic Culture, author Philip F. Lawler stated that "the toxic influence of the [sex abuse] scandal has seeped into yet another aspect of Catholic life, tarnishing the memory of potential saints." Lawler stated that "the same chain of evidence raises more serious questions about another beloved Catholic figure who is now a candidate for beatification: the late Father John Hardon, SJ." Lawler was perplexed, asking: "Once McGuire had admitted to some degree of misconduct, after earlier blanket denials, why was Father Hardon ready to accept his later denials of the more serious charges?" Lawler concluded:

"The available evidence also sheds a very unflattering light on Father Hardon’s involvement. In the absence of some better explanation, it appears that his gross misjudgment had devastating consequences for the lives of several young boys - and perhaps for his cause for beatification as well."

=== Enneagram ===
Prompted by a woman's question at St. John's, Hardon wrote an article objecting to the enneagram of personality, viewing it as a New Age process dangerous to the Catholic faith.

In 1984, he was summoned to a consultation with his Jesuit superiors and informed he would be forbidden to teach at any Jesuit institution, a prohibition lasting sixteen years until his death. He viewed this as persecution for teaching the faith, a "white martyrdom", and he would advise his listeners that they should be willing to suffer for the true doctrines of Catholicism.

== Campaign for beatification ==
In 2005, Cardinal Raymond Burke, former director of Hardon's Marian Catechist Apostolate, initiated Hardon's cause for canonization. Hardon's personal papers and library are currently being held at the Eternal Life Apostolate, which is working for his beatification.

== Bibliography ==
- All My Liberty
- The Treasury of Catholic Wisdom
- A Prophet for the Priesthood
- With Us Today: On the Real Presence of Jesus Christ in the Eucharist
- The History of Eucharistic Adoration
- Modern Catholic Dictionary
- Theology of Prayer
- Spiritual Life in the Modern World
- Salvation and Sanctification
- Holiness in the Church
- The Faith
- History and Theology of Grace: The Catholic Teaching on Divine Grace
- The Question and Answer Catholic Catechism, Doubleday, 1981. ISBN 978-0-385-13664-8
- The Catholic Catechism: A Contemporary Catechism of the Teachings of the Catholic Church, Doubleday, 1975. ISBN 978-0-385-50819-3
- Retreat with the Lord: A Popular Guide to the Spiritual Exercises of Ignatius of Loyola
- The Pocket Catechism, Doubleday, 1989. ISBN 978-0-385-24293-6
- The Pocket Catholic Dictionary: Abridged Edition of a Modern Catholic Dictionary, Doubleday, 1985. ISBN 978-0-385-23238-8
- The Catholic Lifetime Reading Plan
- Catholic Prayer book
- Marian Catechist Manual
- Christianity in the Twentieth Century, St. Paul Editions, 1977.
- Religions of the World
