= Internet in prisons =

Internet use in prisons allows inmates to communicate with the outside world. Much like the use of telephones in prisons, the use of the internet under supervision, for various purposes, is approved in 49 U.S. correctional systems and five Canadian provinces. Each of the reporting U.S. systems, except Hawaii, Iowa, Nebraska and Nevada, use computers to employ inmate educational programs, as do all five reporting provinces in Canada. There are 36 reporting U.S. systems to handle inmate health issues via telemedicine. However much like the use of mobile phones in prison, internet access without supervision, via a smartphone, or personal laptop/iPad is banned for all inmates.

== Internet access in prisons globally ==
=== Australia ===
Prisoner access to computer facilities and Internet resources varies across jurisdictions in Australia. In some states personal computer capable devices are permitted for use in cells, managed Internet access is provided in some, while in other states all existing devices are withdrawn. The use of computers is generally for study, legal purposes, and managed reintegration. The rationale for this policy is to ensure that all prisoners in need of access to computer for educational or legal purposes are not to be disadvantaged. The policy reduces and effectively manages the risks associated with prisoner access to computers in cells.

=== Canada ===
In Canada, inmates are legally barred from internet access.

=== Germany ===
In Germany, access to the internet is allowed in a few states.

=== Iceland ===
In Iceland, inmates in open environment prisons are allowed limited access to internet (social media and porn being barred) and browsing activity logged. Inmates in other classes of Icelandic prisons are banned from using the internet but use various methods to gain access, this is kindly overlooked by prison officers as long as inmates are not caught browsing or the prison does not receive complaints about threatening or offensive behaviour online.

=== Malaysia ===
Since 2008, the Malaysian Prison Department had allowed selected prisoners to undergo higher education at Open University Malaysia (OUM) beginning with prisoners at Kajang Prison. The role played by OUM in offering the education programs marked significant efforts in changing the path for inmates to lead productive lives in society.

The prison allocated the usage of computer and internet by the inmates from 8 am to 5pm daily. The prison management authority will also monitor and access the usage of the internet whereby it is strictly only for the learning purposes in getting references from the OUM digital library which has 700,000 references online. Their study time is limited and they must fully utilize it for learning.

=== Netherlands ===
In the Netherlands is no right to internet in prisons, though internet can be used by prisoners in some cases. Internet is mostly used for education and preparing prisoners for reintegration, when they access the internet, they can only visit websites that are on the "white list" . Prisoners can now also call their families using video calls. It is also possible to email with the outside world.

=== Norway ===
Closed prisons (high security prisons) do not allow the use of mobile smartphones while mid to low security do. All of these prisons have a limited access to Internet and prisoners do not have access to social media. Besides, all activities can be tracked. This is a similar policy as in Iceland's open prisons, but does allow all prisoners access to internet while well behaved and this strategy has proven to be rewarding and does relieve stress from staff.

=== Philippines ===
In the Philippines, prisoners are allowed to access the Internet while closely supervised.

=== Romania ===
In Romania, a survey was conducted in 2008 to assess the situation on availability of IT services to inmates in prisons. A response was received from 14 out of the 36 prisons in the country. Of the 14, 7 prisons had no computer access to inmates, 5 prisons had computers from different donations, 1 prison stated they had 5 computers with internet access but are for staff use only. The 6 prisons that had computer access sometimes used it for recreational purposes, however some do have organized training courses to teach inmates computer operating. Connection to the internet is forbidden to inmates in all prisons however.

=== Ukraine ===
Recently in Ukraine inmates have been formally allowed to use the internet and cellphones without any restrictions. This new law allows prisoners to use cellular networks, but a recent revision by State Penitentiary Service Head S. Starenkiy forces inmates to use prison phones exclusively if available. This law doesn't specify the right to possess electronic devices, a loophole that has become a cornerstone of prison administrations' arguments against the use of technology.

As it stands, internet access is only allowed where prisons have total control over their inmates internet activity. The administrations banned social networks, e-mail, and porn sites among other services. This regulation chipped away at the spirit of unfettered internet access written into the original law. Human rights activists attribute these extra restrictions to being a consequence of staff illegally providing inmates with unregulated cellphones.

=== United Kingdom ===
Prisoners in the United Kingdom generally do not have access to the internet. The use of mobile phones by prisoners in the United Kingdom is strictly prohibited.

=== United States ===
==== Federal prison system ====
In the United States, the Federal Bureau of Prisons, an agency of the US Department of Justice, put into place a fee-based system called Trust Fund Limited Inmate Computer System (TRULINCS) on February 19, 2009. This allows inmates access to electronic messaging through e-mails. The message must be text only, and must be conducted in a secure manner between inmate and the public. Messages are subject to monitoring. Currently all institutions operated by the Bureau of Prisons have TRULINCS. However outside of the TRULINCS program, nearly all states prohibit Internet use by inmates, severely limiting technology-based access to educational opportunities. Inmates are allowed to use emails to contact lawyers if they have no family to do it for them, and some states allow very limited contact to family if no funds are available for phone services.

==== State prisons systems ====
State prisons systems offer JPay as a computer system offering video conferencing, messaging, and e-mail services on a monitored basis. While technological ingenuity and advancements improved the prison system, drawbacks emerged, such as insufficient funds for additional content. The California prison system contracted with ViaPath Technologies to obtain digital tablets for inmates. Global Tel Link based in Virginia has also provided Tablets pre-loaded with LexisNexis to inmates in Washington State until their merger with ViaPath. Juvenile tablets feature Khan Academy to assist with obtaining a GED or adult education. American Prison Data Systems (ADPS) also competes in the prison tablet space with educational features such as TED talks.

== Rehabilitating purposes ==
A European conference on Prison Education and Training was held in February 2010. Over 200 delegates from across Europe were in attendance. It was suggested to be widely accepted that prisons are damaging to the inmates, and therefore a method to decrease the potential damage is to provide the inmates an education during their incarceration. This would eventually contribute to the inmate’s successful reentry into society. The internet is a convenient study tool, and if used correctly would contribute to the inmate’s studies.

In Norway, the educational and sentence act allows inmates in Norway to have a legal right to education. The internet is described as digital tool, and has been integrated into the curriculum. This allows the prison to enact a structured and meaningful path for rehabilitation.

Due to the reliance on the internet in society, newly sentenced inmates have already developed a dependency on the internet. The restriction of the internet in the inmate’s daily lives would constitute a major setback in their daily functionings. The sudden removal of a major part in their lives would debilitate their motivation for rehabilitation. Inmates sentences to a longer duration would become technologically impaired when released into a society that is increasingly becoming dependent on the internet. The institution needs to prepare the inmate for reintroduction into the outside society, and doing so necessitates the familiarity with the internet.

== Controversy surrounding inmate access to Internet ==
Allowing access to the internet for inmates is a topic with much debate. The argument for the permittance of use is largely for rehabilitation or providing an environment that encourages rehabilitation. However, in the United States, security measures and state statutes in both public and private correctional institutions are significant barriers in expanding the use of the Internet to support the delivery of postsecondary education. Many inmates experience a lack of access to computer equipment and security routines in prisons interfere with their education.

Inmates can also use the internet for other, illegal purposes. It has been recorded that through smuggling smart phones, inmates have called up phone directories, maps, and photographs for criminal activities. As society becomes increasingly internet-dependent, gang violence and drug trafficking is being conducted through the internet, thus inmates are able to keep up with criminal activities even while being incarcerated. In the United States, cell phone smuggling into prisons has been an increasing problem.

In 2010, the Federal Bureau of Prisons workers confiscated 1,188 mobile devices. Most of the smuggled cell phones have access to the internet, and inmates are able to connect without monitoring from guards.

== See also ==
- Mobile phones in prison
