= Sexual abuse scandal in the Society of Jesus =

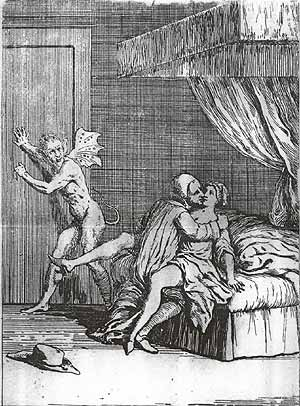
The seduction of Catherine Cadière by the Jesuit Jean-Baptiste Girard. Contemporary engraving shows the devil guiding the Jesuit.

The Jesuits have had different episodes of Catholic sex abuse cases in various jurisdictions.

== Abuse in the United States ==
=== Diocese of Chicago ===
Internal church records released in 2013 indicate that the Jesuits of the Archdiocese of Chicago willfully concealed sex crimes committed by a Jesuit priest Donald McGuire for more than four decades. A letter written in 1970 by John Reinke, a president of Loyola Academy where McGuire worked, admitted that McGuire's presence at Loyola was "positively destructive and corrosive", but suggested transferring him to Loyola University instead of sending him to treatment or turning him over to the legal system. McGuire was finally tried for his crimes and found guilty of molesting two teenage students in Wisconsin in 2006. McGuire was sentenced to seven years in prison for this, and was later tried and found guilty for another act of abuse in 2009. This time, he was sentenced to 25 years, making it likely that he would die in prison. McGuire died in a federal prison in 2017.

==== Lawsuit ====
Robert Goldberg, one of McGuire's victims who was instrumental in his conviction, filed a lawsuit against both the Midwest Jesuit Province and the main Society of Jesus office in Rome in 2019.

=== Diocese of Fairbanks ===
In February 2008, the diocese of Fairbanks announced plans to file for Chapter 11 bankruptcy, claiming inability to pay the 140 plaintiffs who filed claims against the diocese for alleged sexual abuse by priests or church workers dating from the 1950s to the early 1980s. The Society of Jesus, Oregon Province, was named as a co-defendant in the case, and settled for $50 million. The Diocese, which reports an operating budget of approximately $6 million, claims one of the diocese's insurance carriers failed to "participate meaningfully".

=== Diocese of Portland ===
The lawsuits in the Fairbanks diocese have also affected the Jesuit community in the diocese of Portland, given that the Western Province of the American Jesuits is located in the State of Oregon. In February 2009, the Province of Oregon became the first Jesuit province to file for bankruptcy. In March 2011, the Oregon Jesuit Province agreed to pay nearly 500 victims of sex abuse $166.1 million. As party of the bankruptcy agreement, the Oregon Jesuit Province also disclosed the list of Jesuit clergy who were accused of committing sex abuse.

=== Diocese of Boston ===
In 2002, criminal charges were brought against five Roman Catholic priests in the Boston area of the United States, including Jesuit priest James Talbot, which ultimately resulted in his conviction and prison sentence.

=== Diocese of St Petersburg ===
In 1985, Jesuit priest Norman J. Rogge pleaded guilty to sexually abusing a boy in 1984 and received a one-year prison sentence. He previously pleaded guilty to another charge of sex abuse against a minor in 1967 and received a sentence of three years probation and forced psychiatric therapy.

=== Diocese of New Orleans ===
By 2019, sex abuse lawsuits which were filed against at least two former Jesuits who were accused of committing sex abuse at Jesuit high schools were settled.

=== Cheverus High School ===
In 1998, nine male alumni claimed that they had been molested while attending the Jesuit school Cheverus. Two former faculty members, Jesuit priest and teacher James Talbot and teacher and coach Charles Malia, were accused. The school, located in Portland, Maine, confirmed the abuse and apologized to the victims. The victims also accused both Cheverus High School and the Portland Diocese of hiding information, and that they had previously known about the abuse. Settlements to victims have reached a cumulative seven figures, with ongoing counseling additional. Talbot, who was the former chair of the English Department, and Malia, the former head of the Track Team, have admitted they are guilty. Both teachers lost their jobs at Cheverus in 1998. Before public accusations surfaced that he committed sex abuse at Boston College High School, James Talbot had been accused of molesting a student at Cheverus. On September 24, 2018, Talbot pled guilty to the sex abuse charges in Maine and immediately began serving two concurrent three-year prison sentences.

=== List of Accused Clergy ===
==== Northeast United States ====
On January 15, 2018, the USA Northeast Province of the Society of Jesus released a list Tuesday of 50 priests under its jurisdiction who had been "credibly accused" of sexual misconduct with minors The list includes priests who served in Jesuit high schools and colleges throughout New England, New York and northern New Jersey. However, the list only includes ordained Jesuits and does not include some accused people who were affiliated with the Jesuits. Seven on the list taught at Cheverus High School in Portland, Maine. All but 15 of the Roman Catholic priests on the list are dead, and all of the alleged abuse took place before 1997.

==== Central and Southern United States ====
On December 7, 2018, the USA Central and Southern Province of the Society of Jesus released a list of 42 priests under its jurisdiction who had allegations of sex abuse. The list also includes those from predecessor organizations such as the New Orleans Province, the Missouri Province, and the Independent Region of Puerto Rico of the Society of Jesus. Those with credible allegations are either deceased or no longer in active ministry, while 4 who had less credible allegations are still active in the province.

==== Western United States ====
On December 7, 2018, the USA West Province released a list of Jesuit clergy who had been accused of committing sex abuse while working for areas in the province. Reports of abuse are dated as early as 1950, While the Province of the present-day was formed in 2017. the list includes reported abuse in the former California and the former Oregon Provinces, against whom a credible claim of sexual abuse of a minor (under the age of 18) or a vulnerable adult has been made. The former Oregon Province was also required to release the list of accused clergy as party of its bankruptcy settlement.

==== Midwest ====
On December 17, 2018, the USA Midwest Province of the Society of Jesus released a list of Jesuits who had been accused of molesting children while working for areas in the province. Listed reports of abuse go as early as 1955. The present-day Province was formed in 2017 as a merger between the Chicago, Chicago-Detroit, Detroit, and Wisconsin provinces.

==== Maryland Province ====
On December 17, 2018, The USA Maryland Province of the Society of Jesus released the names of Jesuits who had been accused of molesting children while working for the Province. The list goes as far back as 1950 at earliest. The now-defunct Province stretched from the state of Georgia to the areas just below the state of New York.

== Abuse in Europe ==
=== Germany ===
==== Canisius-Kolleg Berlin ====
In 2004 and 2005 two former students of the school told the headmaster of this Jesuit school that they had been sexually abused by two of their former teachers. In December 2009 and January 2010 two other boys contacted the headmaster and claimed the same about the same teachers. The headmaster decided to write a letter to all former students in which he stated that he was deeply sorry for what happened. After receiving the letter several others of the former students contacted the headmaster and said that they too had been abused. In January 2010, the headmaster wrote a personal letter of apology to all pupils at the school.

The names of the former students claiming to be sexually abused have been withheld from the public, but the public was told that many of them were notable scientists or held political or economic positions of power. It was also revealed that some of the alumni who had been abused decided to send their children to the Canisius-Kolleg. One of the teachers has spoken out and said the allegations made against him were true, because he really had abused boys. The teachers might not be sued for what they did, because it seems that in most cases the statute of limitations has passed, but the abused boys wanted them to apologize. Apologies and financial compensations were issued to the victims.

An investigative report detailing allegations of substantial abuse was released in 2010.

==== Jesuit College of Sankt Blasien ====
In 2010, Padre Wolfgang S. admitted to several acts of sexual abuse of minors during his years as a teacher in Sankt Blasius from 1982 to 1984. Prior to that he had taught in another Jesuit college in Berlin (Canisius-Kolleg) where he had also molested children. The order in 2010 concedes that upon discovery, his superiors did provide help for him to emigrate to South America. Other cases of sexual abuse of minors in the Jesuit order have also been reported lately and are being investigated. As of February 2010, it seems that all cases have become time-barred.

=== Ireland ===
The Jesuit order asked victims of Father Joseph Marmion to engage with the order as part of a restorative justice process. Marmion had been named as an abuser in 2021. A report was published as a narrative record of his abuse, which covered allegations against Marmion from the first allegation of sexual abuse in 1977. 45 of the 93 complaints concerning Marmion concerned sexual abuse of children. Of the 93 complaints, 65 refer to his time at Belvedere College, 14 to Clongowes Wood College and 14 to his time in Crescent College, Limerick.

There were 34 complaints of sexual abuse concerning 19 Jesuits other than Marmion at the same three schools.

The same report named another Jesuit who a complaint was made - Father Paul Andrews, now deceased, who had been rector of Belvedere College for a while. The complaint was made in 1991 and concerned abuse in a non-school setting. The complaint was made twice again in 1994 and was reported to Gardaí in 1995, the first notification of a complaint to them about a Jesuit.

Gardaí prepared a file for the Director of Public Prosecutions who directed in February 1997 that no prosecution be taken. Andrews was allowed to resume his duties without restriction until 2002, when a newly-formed Child Protection Committee was asked to review the case. Said committee said that the DPPs' decision was neither a declaration of guilt of innocence and he should be no longer allowed to practice any kind of ministry with minors. He was formally requested to cease ministry with minors from June 2002. The report acknowledged that the case of Andrews was badly handled on multiple fronts, including Andrews being allowed to return to work with minors, the lack of care being given to complainant and family and the case not being reported to the Health Board until 2010.

The report also mentions that Andrews was the first Jesuit to receive a complaint of child sexual abuse against Marmion, when Andrews was rector of Belvedere College in 1977. Andrews and two other priests - who were aware of the complaint against Marmion, agreed that the need to safeguard the reputation of the Jesuit order and avoid public scandal was central. The report concludes that this clearly "some part of the explanation" why Marmion was not reported to Gardaí. The report says that it cannot be known if the complaint against Andrews influenced him in keeping Marmions' history of child sexual abuse secret.

Andrews was also director of St Declan's School, Dublin from 1977 until late 1994. The late Father Dermot Casey, who preceded Andrews as director of the school from 1958 to 1977. He was the subject of 17 complaints about child sexual abuse. The reports were made from 1975 to 2023 and concern events from the 1950s to 1977.

=== Slovenia ===
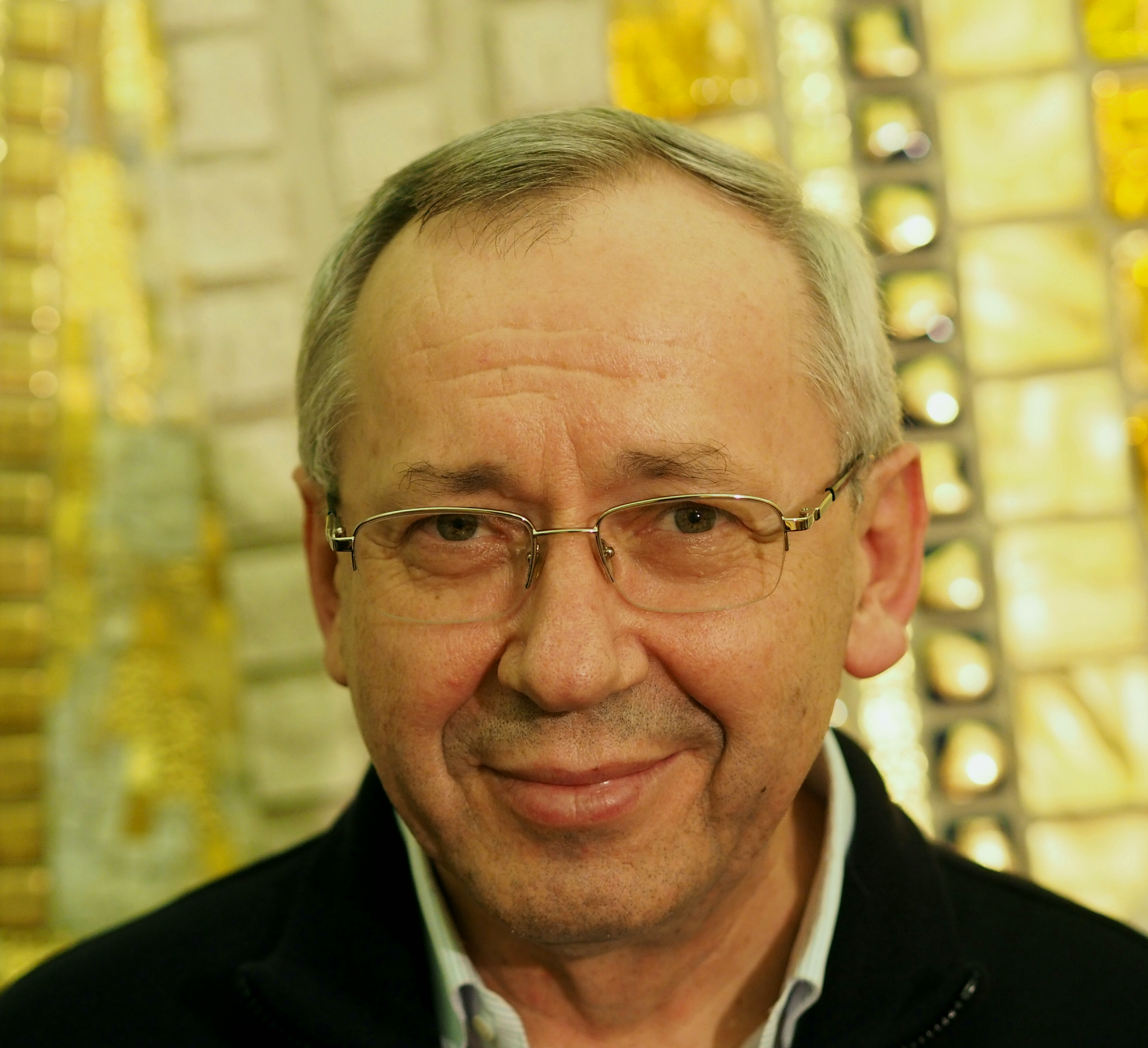
Marko Rupnik

The Jesuit superior general Arturo Sosa then revealed on 14 December 2022 that, after a 2019 complaint, Marko Rupnik had been convicted and sanctioned by the Holy See for the ecclesiastical crime of absolution of an accomplice. Rupnik had absolved a woman in confession of having engaged in sexual activity with him. Rupnik's excommunication was lifted after he repented for his crime. Despite the earlier statement on 2 December 2022, the restrictions on Rupnik's ministry "actually dated from that confession-related conviction, and not the 2021 allegations that the Vatican’s sex crimes office decided to shelve because they were deemed too old to prosecute."

According to journalist Nicole Winfield, the "Rupnik's scandal has underscored the weaknesses in the Vatican’s abuse policies concerning spiritual and sexual abuse of adult women, and how powerful priests can often count on high-ranking support even after credible allegations against them are lodged."

=== Spain ===
In January 2021, the Society of Jesus in Spain released an internal report admitting that 96 Jesuits had sexually abused 81 children and 37 adults since 1927. The order apologized for a "culture of silence" that allowed these abuses to persist.

The scandal in Spain widened significantly in 2023 with the "Pedrajas Diary" revelations. Alfonso Pedrajas was a Spanish Jesuit sent to Bolivia, and his diary implicated the Spanish provincial leadership in knowing about and facilitating his transfers to conceal abuse. The Spanish state prosecutor opened proceedings to investigate the complicity of Spanish clerical authorities in these transnational crimes.

== Abuse in Latin America ==
=== Chile ===
Rev. Stefan Dartmann disclosed that the same abusive teacher in Germany had been guilty of similar crimes in Jesuit schools in Chile and Spain.

In August 2019, revelations surfaced that Jesuit Father Renato Poblete, who died in 2010, had sexually abused 18 adult women and four underage female minors. He also impregnated at least one of these women and forced her to have an abortion. One of the minors he abused was only three years old and a daughter of one of his adult victims as well.

=== Bolivia ===
In May 2023, the Spanish newspaper El País published an investigation based on the personal diary of Alfonso "Pica" Pedrajas, a Spanish Jesuit who died in 2009. In the diary, Pedrajas admitted to sexually abusing approximately 85 children, mostly during his time as a teacher at the Juan XXIII College in Cochabamba in the 1970s and 1980s. The diary detailed how he confessed his crimes to superior Jesuits, who subsequently covered up the abuse by transferring him to different countries rather than reporting him to civil authorities.

The revelation prompted the Bolivian government to launch a major investigation. In 2025, a Bolivian court sentenced two former Jesuit provincials, Marcos Recolons and Ramón Alaix, to prison for the crime of concealment related to the Pedrajas case.

The investigation into Pedrajas also led to the discovery of abuses by other Jesuits in the region, including Luis María Roma. In 2024, it was revealed that Roma, who worked in the indigenous community of Charagua, had taken hundreds of photographs and videos of indigenous girls he had abused. The Society of Jesus in Bolivia publicly apologized, admitting that their handling of the complaints had been "negligent" and "disastrous."

== Lawsuit against Rome headquarters ==
On December 31, 2019, it was reported that Robert Goldberg, who was sexually abused by the late Chicago-area Jesuit priest Donald McGuire, was suing both the Midwest Jesuit Province and the main Society of Jesus office in the Vatican.

== See also ==
- Child abuse
- Child sexual abuse
- Religious abuse
- Sexual abuse
- Sexual misconduct
- Spiritual abuse
