= Alfred Gaynor =

American serial killer and rapist

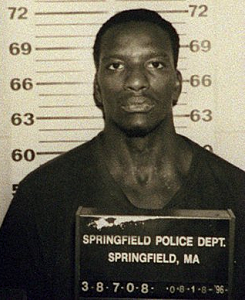
- Born: Alfred J. Gaynor; December 10, 1966 (age 59); Springfield, Massachusetts, U.S.
- Conviction: First degree murder (8 counts)
- Penalty: Life imprisonment without parole

Details
- Victims: 9
- Span of crimes: 1995–1998
- Country: United States
- State: Massachusetts
- Date apprehended: April 10, 1998
- Imprisoned at: Souza-Baranowski Correctional Center, Lancaster, Massachusetts

Alfred J. Gaynor (born December 10, 1966) is an American serial killer and rapist. From 1995 to 1998, he murdered nine women between the ages of 20 and 45 in Springfield, Massachusetts. Gaynor was subsequently given four sentences of life imprisonment without parole.

== Biography ==
Little is known about Gaynor's early years. He was born on December 10, 1966, in Springfield, as one of several children. After school, having no education, he engaged in low-skill labor. Later, in the late 1980s, he began working at an automobile repair shop, while periodically also engaging in day labor. At this time, he developed an addiction to drugs and alcohol.

== Murders ==
In early April 1995, Gaynor began his murder spree, first starting with 45-year-old Vera E. Hallums, whom he asked to spend a night in her apartment. In the middle of the night, Gaynor attacked the sleeping woman, tying her up and beating her; Hallums subsequently died of a brain injury. After her death, he raped her corpse, robbed the apartment, and disappeared into the night. Hallums' body was found on April 20.

On June 15, 1997, Gaynor met 34-year-old drug addict Jill Ann Ermellini near her home. Having lured the woman to a parking lot under the pretense of selling her drugs, he attacked her, strangling and robbing her before hiding her body in a truck. On October 24, Gaynor met another drug addict, 29-year-old Robin M. Atkins. After using cocaine together, while in a drugged state, Gaynor attacked Atkins, beating and raping her. Soon after, he strangled her to death, stealing money and other valuables from her wallet.

On October 31, Gaynor met 38-year-old JoAnn C. Thomas. Once in her apartment, Gaynor sodomized and subsequently strangled her, leaving his fingerprints and semen on the crime scene. Two weeks later, on November 14, Gaynor went to the house of his longtime girlfriend: 33-year-old Yvette Torres. While they were abusing alcohol and drugs together, Gaynor attacked Torres late in the evening, during which he strangled her. After the murder, Gaynor stole a videocassette recorder from her house, as well as a number of other items, all of which he later sold.

On February 1, 1998, Gaynor went to a crack house to purchase narcotics. That evening, he met 38-year-old Loretta Daniels, who agreed to have sex with him in exchange for drugs. Several blocks away, Gaynor strangled Daniels in an alley, after which he sodomized her corpse, leaving semen traces on her. Her body was discovered the following day. Gaynor repeated the process on February 10, going to the same crack house with the aim of exchanging CDs for crack cocaine. In the evening, he met 42-year-old Rosemary Downs, a woman with a drug addiction who worked as a prostitute. The two went to Downs' apartment, where they used crack until the early morning. Gaynor then raped her, tied her up, and put a gag in her mouth before leaving. Downs later died from suffocation.

On February 18, Gaynor strangled 37-year-old Joyce Dickerson-Peay. The day after the murder, her daughter went to the police to report her disappearance. During the investigation, witnesses said that before she vanished, Dickerson-Peay spent time with Gaynor and two other girls who were using crack cocaine, and later unsuccessfully tried to sell a number of items in exchange for crack. Gaynor was later detained and interrogated on February 27. During said interrogation, a blood sample was taken from him, and while he failed to provide an adequate alibi, he was nevertheless released, since Dickerson-Peay's body hadn't been located at the time. Her corpse was finally located on March 11, and as in previous cases, the killer's biological traces were found on the body. Based on the results from DNA profiling, Gaynor's involvement in the deaths of Rosemary Downs and Joyce Dickerson-Peay was established, and he was arrested again on April 10.

== Trial and imprisonment ==
On April 30, 1998, during one of the court hearings, Gaynor was attacked by the son of one of his victims, Eric Downs. During the assault with a chair, Gaynor received physical injuries ranging from a mild to moderate severity. Downs was subsequently charged with assault and contempt of court.

As a result of the DNA examination and fingerprint evidence, the prosecutors were able to prove that the accused had killed Rosemary Downs, Joyce Dickerson-Peay, Loretta Daniels, and JoAnn Thomas. In May 2000, Gaynor was found guilty and received four sentences of life imprisonment without chance of parole, never having admitted his guilt.

In 2008, Gaynor suddenly turned to the Hampden County Attorney's Office with a proposal for a plea agreement. Based on the terms of the agreement, Gaynor confessed to the murders of Vera Hellums, Jill Ann Ermellini, Robin Atkins, and Yvette Torres, but he also surprisingly confessed to murdering 20-year-old Amy Smith, who was killed in Springfield in June 1996. Gaynor's nephew, Paul Fickling, had already been charged with and sentenced to life imprisonment for her murder in 1997. In exchange for his testimony, Gaynor demanded the annulment of his nephew's sentence and a new trial. Although his confession cast doubt on the reliability of the conviction, an agreement on the acceptance of his guilt was ultimately reached. Gaynor later explained his motivation to confess was the 2006 death of his mother. He stated that he could not plead guilty to any killings prior to her death because he did not want to inflict psychological trauma on her.

In 2010, Paul Fickling's sentence was overturned. In a new trial, which took into account a deal struck with the judge, Fickling was convicted of complicity in the murder of Amy Smith and received 20 years imprisonment, taking into account the 14 years which he had already served.

In October of that year, Gaynor admitted he murdered three additional people. A month later, he pleaded guilty to an eighth murder.

Gaynor is currently serving his sentences at the Souza-Baranowski Correctional Center. While in prison, Gaynor became known for making paintings and profiting from them, causing outrage from relatives of his victims.

== Victims ==
- April 1995: Vera E. Hallums, 45
- June 1996: Amy Smith, 20 (Gaynor's nephew was convicted of her murder; her daughter also died)
- June 15, 1997: Jill Ann Ermellini, 34
- October 24, 1997: Robin M. Atkins, 29
- October 31, 1997: JoAnn C. Thomas, 38
- November 14, 1997: Yvette Torres, 33 (Gaynor's girlfriend)
- February 1, 1998: Loretta Daniels, 38
- February 10, 1998: Rosemary Downs, 42 (her son later attacked Gaynor in court)
- February 18, 1998: Joyce Dickerson-Peay, 37

== See also ==
- Ali Ghaffar
- Stewart Weldon
- List of serial killers in the United States
