= Stewart Weldon =

American serial killer, serial rapist, and kidnapper (born 1977)

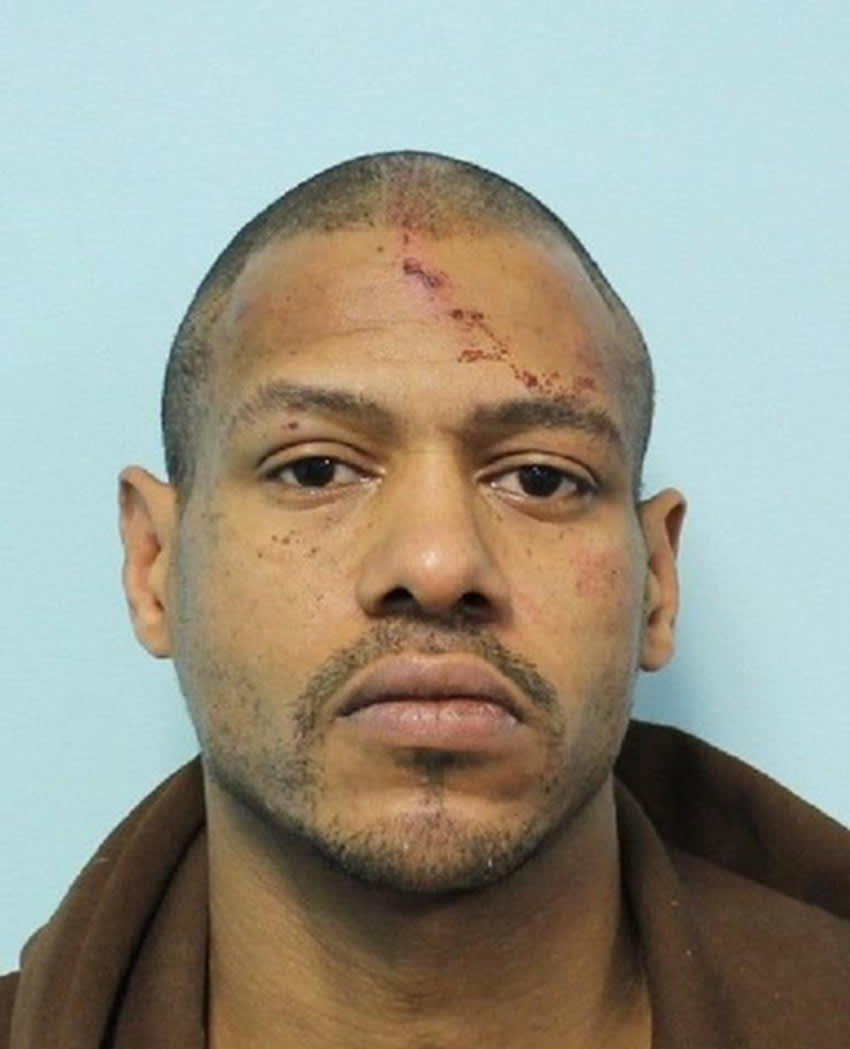
- Mug shot of Weldon, 2018
- Born: Stewart Rudolph Weldon; June 24, 1977 (age 49); Queens, New York City, U.S.
- Convictions: First degree murder (x3); Kidnapping; Rape; Indecent assault Battery
- Penalty: Life imprisonment without the possibility of parole

Details
- Victims: 3
- Span of crimes: 2017–2018
- Country: United States
- State: Massachusetts
- Date apprehended: May 27, 2018
- Imprisoned at: Old Colony Correctional Center, Bridgewater, Massachusetts

Stewart Rudolph Weldon (born June 24, 1977) is an American serial killer, serial rapist, and kidnapper who murdered three women and hid their bodies on his property in Springfield, Massachusetts, from 2017 to 2018. After an arrest for kidnapping a would-be fourth victim, police searched his home and discovered his victims' remains. He pleaded guilty to the murders in 2021 and was sentenced to three consecutive life sentences without parole.

== Early life ==
Stewart Weldon was born in the Jamaica neighborhood of Queens, New York City, In his early childhood, he and his family moved from New York to Montclair, New Jersey, a wealthier area. In 1996, his father died suddenly, and afterwards friends claimed that Weldon's mother spoiled him.

== Crimes ==
In 1996, at age 19, Weldon and a friend, Dwight Pottinger, visited a nearby mall, where they encountered three young women. After some time, the two drove the three girls home. Two of the girls got out of the car when they arrived, but Weldon and Pottinger forced the third to stay at gunpoint. According to the then-18-year-old woman, Pottinger sexually assaulted her before driving her to her parents' house and fleeing the area. The two were later arrested for sexual assault and convicted. Sometime after getting released, Weldon was arrested in East Orange on weapons charges and kidnapping, later pleading guilty and sentenced to three years' probation. In 2006, he and another man were arrested in connection with the 2001 burglary and arson of an auto dealership in Maywood. He was sentenced to one year and one day in prison.

Upon his release, Weldon moved from New Jersey and voyaged to Springfield, Massachusetts, where in July 2010 he was arrested for attempting to break into a liquor store but was spotted and led police on a chase. He was convicted of these crimes and sentenced to serve 18 months in prison. In 2015 he was arrested after threatening to shoot up a downtown bar. Once apprehended, he punched a security guard. In October 2017, shortly after the birth of his child, Weldon was wanted on accusations of attacking a woman. Instead of complying with the police, he led them on a high-speed chase, which ended when he attempted to ram his car into a police vehicle. He was eventually apprehended and charged with assault with a dangerous weapon and assault on a police officer. His bail was set at $2,500. It was downgraded to $1,000, and his mother paid it off, and Weldon was released from police custody. At the time, he was living at his mother's house.

=== 2018 arrest ===
On May 27, 2018, while waiting at a red light, Weldon was pulled over by Springfield police after being spotted with a broken taillight. Officers attempted to pull him over, but a car chase ensued, where he was apprehended. There was a terrified woman in the front seat. She told the officers that she had been kidnapped, raped, and beaten repeatedly. She showed her broken jaw and multiple stab wounds on her abdomen. The woman exclaimed loudly that he had kidnapped her. Weldon was then quickly arrested and taken into custody. The woman was later interviewed by police, and she told them that Weldon had held her captive for over a month, continually hitting her with a hammer and raping her. She was treated for multiple injuries, including a fractured jaw, stab wounds, marks from being hit with a blunt instrument and a leg infection.

=== Murder victims ===
After Weldon's arrest, his mother called police and told them she was worried after noticing a foul odor inside the house. On June 1, law enforcement issued a warrant to seize Weldon's property at 1333 Page Boulevard. During the search, police located the origins of the smell—the decomposing bodies of three women. The victims were identified as follows:

- America Lyden, 34, was a Springfield native. She was reported missing on December 1, 2017.
- Ernestine Ryans, 47, was a Springfield native. She was reported missing on March 18, 2018.
- Kayla Escalante, 26, was a native of Ludlow, Massachusetts. She had yet to be reported missing. Her family said that they last heard from her in December.

It was also found that Weldon's arrest coincided with the end of a series of rapes that began in June 2017. By the time of his arrest, eight women had been raped in Springfield. Weldon is believed to have been the perpetrator.

== Legal proceedings ==
Weldon was charged with 52 crimes, including three counts of first-degree murder, eight counts of strangulation, nine counts of aggravated rape, two counts of rape, five counts of aggravated kidnapping and four counts of kidnapping. He pleaded not guilty. His bail was set at $2,000,000. Weldon was scheduled to stand trial in April 2020; however, due to the COVID-19 pandemic, the trial was postponed.

In October 2020, a judge ordered Weldon to undergo mental health evaluations to see if he was in fact competent to stand trial. The following September, he was ruled competent to stand trial. Jury selection was due to begin on October 6, with the trial scheduled to start on October 12. On September 28, 2021, Weldon changed his plea from not guilty to guilty.

On September 30, 2021, Weldon was sentenced to three life terms, which were to run consecutively.

== See also ==
- Alfred Gaynor
- Ali Ghaffar
- List of serial rapists
- List of serial killers in the United States
