= Ali Ghaffar =

American serial rapist (born 2001)

- Born: May 2001 (age 25)
- Convictions: Aggravated rape (12 counts); Armed kidnapping with serious bodily injury (6 counts); Assault and battery with a dangerous weapon; Threat to commit a crime (4 counts); Indecent assault and battery on a person 14 or older (3 counts); Assault to rape (3 counts); Larceny
- Penalty: 22 years imprisonment

Details
- Victims: 6–8+
- Span of crimes: 2021–2022
- Country: United States
- State: Massachusetts
- Date apprehended: March 31, 2022

Ali Ghaffar (born May 2001) is an American convicted serial rapist who sexually assaulted at least six women in West Springfield, Massachusetts, between June 2021 and March 2022.

In December 2024, Ghaffar pleaded guilty to 30 counts and was sentenced to 22 years in prison.

== Rapes ==
Ghaffar's modus operandi was to approach women in his car in Springfield's South End and offer to give them a ride or drugs. He would then drive them to Clark Field near West Springfield High School or under an I-90 overpass near Bear Hole Reservoir. Once there, he would threaten them at knifepoint or gunpoint before raping them and then abandoning them in the woods.

He was charged with assaulting six victims. Two additional attacks occurred, which he was not charged with, as the victims could not be located or declined to speak with police.

Date	Location	Notes
June 11, 2021	Clark Field	Convicted
July 29, 2021	Clark Field	Convicted
January 16, 2022	Clark Field	Convicted
February 19, 2022	Bear Hole Reservoir	Convicted
February 26, 2022	Bear Hole Reservoir	Convicted
March 4, 2022	Bear Hole Reservoir	Convicted
March 24, 2022	Bear Hole Reservoir	Not charged
March 31, 2022	Bear Hole Reservoir	Prevented
—		Not charged

== Arrest and trial ==
The vehicle Ghaffar used in the rapes was identified through CCTV footage. On March 31, 2022, it was spotted as he was driving a woman to Bear Hole Reservoir. When he came to a stop, officers approached the car and arrested him. He was held without bail and charged with several counts of rape and assault. He was proven to be the perpetrator through DNA evidence and testimony provided by victims.

In December 2024, Ghaffar pleaded guilty to 30 counts. In January, he was sentenced to 22 years imprisonment followed by five years of probation.

== See also ==
- Stewart Weldon
- Alfred Gaynor
- List of serial rapists
