= Cheverus High School =

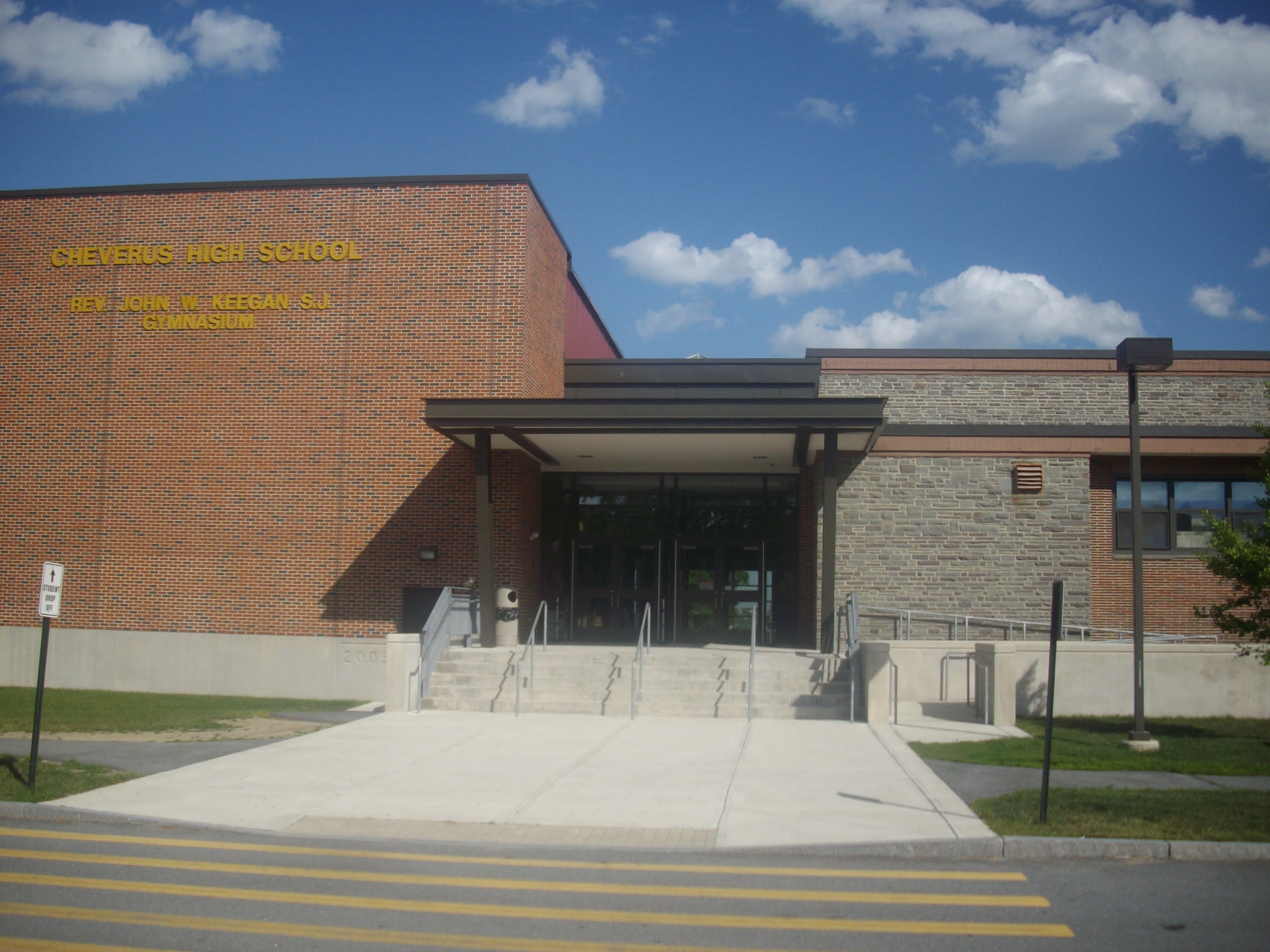

Location
- 267 Ocean Avenue; Portland, Maine 04103; United States; 43°40′46″N 70°16′40″W

Information
- Former name: The Catholic Institute High School
- Type: Private, college-preparatory school
- Motto: Latin: Crescamus in Illo per omnia (May we grow in Him through all things)
- Religious affiliation: Jesuit (Roman Catholic)
- Established: 1917
- Oversight: Roman Catholic Diocese of Portland
- NCES School ID: 00563278
- Principal: John Moran
- Teaching staff: 31.0 (on an FTE basis)
- Grades: 9–12
- Gender: Co-educational
- Enrollment: 344 (2023–2024)
- Student to teacher ratio: 11.1
- Colors: Purple and gold
- Mascot: Stag
- Accreditation: New England Association of Schools and Colleges
- Website: www.cheverus.org

Cheverus High School (simply referred to as Cheverus, formerly The Catholic Institute High School) is a private, Jesuit, co-educational, college-preparatory school in Portland, Maine, United States. It was established in 1917 and is located in the Roman Catholic Diocese of Portland. It is named after Jean-Louis Lefebvre de Cheverus, the first Bishop of Boston.

== History ==
Cheverus High School was established in 1917 as The Catholic Institute High School and renamed Cheverus Classical High School in 1926, after Jean-Louis Lefebvre de Cheverus, the first Bishop of Boston.

The original administration building of Cheverus on State Street was the former home of the first Chief Justice of Maine, Judge Prentice Mellen. The school was initially located on Free Street, moved to Cumberland Avenue in 1946, and then to its present location on Ocean Avenue in 1952. The school was originally run by the diocesan clergy, and the Society of Jesus (Jesuits) took over responsibility in 1942.

In September 2000, the former all-boys school became co-educational, admitting 28 girls, in addition to the 402 enrolled males.

=== Sex abuse ===
In 1998, nine male alumni claimed that they had been molested while attending the school. Two former faculty members were accused. The school confirmed the abuse and apologized to the victims. The victims also accused both the school and the Portland Diocese of hiding information, and that they had previously known about the abuse. Settlements to victims have reached a cumulative seven figures, with ongoing counseling additional.

== Academics ==
Cheverus offers 12 Advanced Placement classes, and has an honors option for most of its courses. Students must take 25.5 courses in 4 years, including at least 4 mathematics courses, 4 English courses, 4 theology courses, 3 science courses, 3 foreign language courses (continuing within the same language), and 3 social studies courses.

== Notable alumni ==
- Joseph E. Brennan, lawyer and politician
- Ian Crocker, swimmer
- John Joubert, serial killer
- Dick Joyce, MLB player
- Charles J. Loring Jr., fighter pilot
- Emily Durgin, distance runner

== Notable faculty ==
- Rodney S. Quinn, politician
- John McLaughlin, television personality and political commentator
- James Talbot, Jesuit priest and convicted rapist
