= Zini Mobiles =

English multinational company

Zini Mobiles Ltd
- Trade name: Zini Mobiles
- Type: Private
- Industry: Telecommunications industry, information technology and consumer electronics
- Founded: 2007; 19 years ago
- Founder: Shazad Talib
- Headquarters: Bradford, United Kingdom (2007-2010); Wenzhou, China (2011-current)
- Area served: Worldwide
- Products: cellphones, smartphones, earphones, smart products

Zini Mobiles Ltd is an English multinational company from the telecommunications, information technology, and consumer electronics sector. It is known for the fabrication of minimalistic cellphones.

== History ==
Zini Mobiles was created on Bradford, West Yorkshire, in 2007 by Shazad Talib. In 2011, Talib moved the company to Shenzen, Guangdong.

The company is present in several continents, including Asia, Africa, Europe, South America and North America.

== Products ==
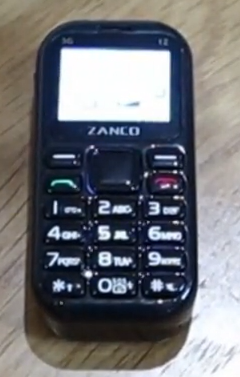
A photo of the Zanco Tiny T2 phone

Zini Mobiles is known for their line of small, minimalistic phones, such as Zanco Tiny T1 and T2, but according to the company, those cellphones only consists of 5% of their production. Other products are earphones, affordable 5G smartphones, phones targeted towards the elderly and smart pens.
