= Zanco Tiny T2 =

Mobile phone model

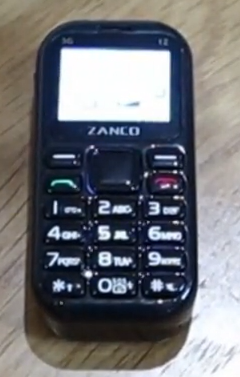
- Front view
- Manufacturer: Zini Mobiles
- Type: Mobile phone
- Predecessor: Zanco Tiny T1
- Dimensions: 2.4 in × 1.18 in × 0.65 in (61 mm × 30 mm × 17 mm)
- Weight: 31 g (1.1 oz)
- CPU: MediaTek MT6276A
- Memory: Built-in 64 MB
- Battery: 500 mAh
- Display: 0.3 Mpx
- Data inputs: Alphanumeric keypad
- Made in: China

Zanco Tiny T2 is a cellphone launched in 2020 by Zini Mobiles. It's the successor of the Zanco Tiny T1. It is considered to be the smallest 3G phone in the world.

== Overview ==
Zanco Tiny T2 was released in 2020 after a campaign on Kickstarter for mass production.

Zanco Tiny T2 comes with a physical keyboard. Its camera has flash and a resolution of 0.3 megapixels. Its TFT screen has the resolution of 128 x 96 pixels. The cellphone has a MediaTek MT6276A processor, 128 MB of RAM memory and 64 MB of storage, expandable to up 32 GB with a microSD card. The battery has 500 mAh and can last to up seven days. The cellphone weights 31 grams and measures 2.4 x 1.18 x 0.65 inches, a bit bigger than a pendrive.

Tiny T2 has internet connection through 2G and 3G, and it doesn't have Wi-Fi connection. It also has Bluetooth 3.0 connection, can reproduce MP3 and MP4 media, has FM radio, calendar and it can send SMS messages. The cellphone comes with six games installed, including Doodle Jump, Tetris, Crossy Road, Snake and a clone of Super Mario. It doesn't have access to marketplaces.
