= Nina Milliken =

American politician

Member of the Maine House of Representatives from the 16th district
- Incumbent
- Assumed office December 7, 2022
- Preceded by: Nathan Carlow

Personal details
- Party: Democratic
- Spouse: Jesse Wessel
- Children: 3
- Education: University of California, Santa Cruz (BA)
- Profession: teacher

Nina Azella Milliken is an American politician who has served as a member of the Maine House of Representatives since December 7, 2022. She represents Maine's 16th House district.

== Electoral history ==
She was elected on November 8, 2022, in the 2022 Maine House of Representatives election against Republican opponent Stephen Hanrahan. She assumed office on December 7, 2022.

== Biography ==
Milliken earned a bachelor of arts in Latin American and Latino Studies from the University of California, Santa Cruz in 2010.

Maine House of Representatives
Preceded by Nathan Carlow	Member of the Maine House of Representatives; 2022–present	Succeeded by incumbent
