= Emily Durgin =

American distance runner (born 1994)

Personal information
- Born: 15 May 1994 (age 32) Standish, Maine, United States

Sport
- Country: United States
- Event(s): Marathon, half marathon, 10km, 5km
- College team: University of Connecticut
- Team: Adidas

Achievements and titles
- Personal best(s): Marathon: 2:26:46; Half Marathon: 1:07:54; 10,000 meters: 31:33; 5,000 meters: 15:24

Emily Durgin (born 15 May 1994) is an American distance runner who competes professionally for Adidas. A native of Standish, Maine, she had a decorated high school running career at Bonny Eagle High School and then Cheverus High School before competing collegiately for the University of Connecticut. Durgin placed 9th at the 2024 United States Olympic Trials (marathon), and she also competed at the 2020 U.S. Olympic Trials.

== Early life ==
Durgin grew up in Standish, Maine and attended Bonny Eagle High School, before transferring to and graduating from Cheverus High School in Portland, Maine. She was a New England Champion and three-time State Champion in cross country, as well as a Footlocker Nationals Finalist. Collegiately, Durgin competed for the UConn Huskies from 2012 to 2017. She won American Athletic Conference Championships in the indoor 3,000 meters, outdoor 5,000 meters, and outdoor 10,000 meters in her senior year.

== Career ==
=== 2017-2021 ===
The summer after graduating from UConn, Durgin won the Maine Women's division at the Beach to Beacon 10K in a time of 34:43. She relocated to Boston shortly thereafter to train with an elite team sponsored by New Balance.

Durgin competed primarily on the track in her early professional career, achieving national-class times in the 5,000 and 10,000 meters. In December 2020, she qualified for the United States Olympic Trials in the 10,000 meters with her time of 32:22.56 at The Track Meet in Capistrano, California.

At the 2020 United States Olympic Trials (track and field) in June 2021, Durgin placed 9th in the 10,000 meters with a time of 32:25.45. Shortly thereafter she signed a professional contract with Adidas.

After the Olympic Trials, she transitioned her focus to road racing and achieved immediate success over the summer of 2021. She placed 2nd in the USATF 10K Championship in Atlanta, GA, 2nd at the USATF 6K Championship in Canton, OH, and 3rd at the USATF 20K Championship in New Haven, CT.

=== 2022-Present ===
Her 2022 season started with a 1:07:54 half marathon performance at the Aramco Houston Half. At the time, her mark was the sixth fastest in history for an American woman.

In May, she returned to the track to run a personal-best 10,000 meter time of 31:33.83 at The Track Meet in Capistrano, California. Over the summer in her home state of Maine, she finished 2nd in a world-class field at the Beach to Beacon 10K, narrowly missing becoming the first American woman to ever win the race.

In the fall, she achieved another top-3 finish at a USATF Road Racing Championship, finishing 3rd over 10 miles in Minneapolis, Minnesota. She made her marathon debut at the 2022 New York City Marathon, but failed to finish the race.

She began 2023 by returning to cross country running, placing 3rd at the USA Cross Country Championships in Richmond, Virginia. In September, she got her second top-3 finish at the USATF 20K Championship in New Haven, CT, recording a time of 1:06:59.

Later that season, Durgin made her second attempt at the marathon distance, racing the Toronto Waterfront Marathon. She was the top American and fifth overall in a time of 2:26:46.

In February 2024, she continued her success in the marathon with a ninth finish of 137 women at the 2024 United States Olympic Trials (marathon) in Orlando, Florida. She ran in the lead pack for much of the race, which took place in hot, sunny conditions.

That spring, Durgin became a US Champion for the first time when she won the USATF 10-mile Championship in Washington, DC in a time of 51:26. She outran several notable competitors including Annie Frisbie, Rachel Smith, and Molly Huddle.

== Personal ==
Through 2024, Durgin lived and trained in Flagstaff, Arizona. In 2025, she relocated to Boulder, Colorado and began coaching for the Hammer and Axe team, while continuing her marathon training.
