= Donald McGuire (Jesuit) =

Jesuit priest

- Church: Roman Catholic Church
- Quashed: 2007
- Other posts: Loyola Academy; Loyola University Chicago; University of San Francisco

Orders
- Ordination: 1961
- Laicized: February 2008

Personal details
- Born: July 9, 1930 Oak Park, Illinois, United States
- Died: January 13, 2017 (aged 86)
- Occupation: Priest
- Education: B.A. classical languages Loyola University Chicago (1952); Lic. philosophy West Baden College (1954); M.A. philosophy Loyola University Chicago (1955); Lic. theology West Baden College (1961); M.A. classical studies Loyola University Chicago (1974); PhD classical studies Loyola University Chicago (1977)
- Criminal information
- Status: Died in prison
- Convictions: Sexual assault against a minor (2006); Child molestation (2009)
- Penalty: 7-year prison term; 20 years probation; 25-year prison term

Details
- Victims: 11
- Span of crimes: 1960s–2001
- Country: United States, Austria, Switzerland

Donald McGuire (July 9, 1930 – January 13, 2017) was an American Jesuit priest and convicted child molester. Prior to his conviction, McGuire was a prominent member of the Jesuit Order and had served as confessor to Mother Teresa. He died in 2017, while serving a 25-year prison sentence.

== Early life and career ==
McGuire was born on July 9, 1930, in Oak Park, Illinois. He joined the Society of Jesus in 1947 and was ordained a priest in 1961. After living in Germany and Austria in the early 1960s, McGuire took up a teaching post in 1965 at Loyola Academy, a high school in Chicago, but moved to Loyola University Chicago in 1970. From 1976 to 1981, he taught at the St. Ignatius Institute of the University of San Francisco. In 1983, he was appointed spiritual director of the Missionaries of Charity, an order founded by Mother Teresa, and also acted as Mother Teresa's confessor.

While at the University of San Francisco, McGuire developed a "roving ministry" leading spiritual retreats for wealthy Catholics. They proved popular, and directing retreats for both lay people and members of Mother Teresa's order became a significant part of his career. The retreats, based on "Ignatian spirituality", were held at locations around the world. As a result, McGuire became one of the most prominent Jesuits of his time, with a world-wide reputation. According to The Boston Globe investigative journalist, Michael Rezendes, McGuire's reputation was as a "globe-trotting spiritual retreat leader who counted Mother Teresa among his fans".

As a result of his later convictions for child sexual abuse, McGuire was dismissed from the Jesuits in 2007 and laicized in 2008. In 2017, McGuire died in prison.

== Abuse and convictions ==
Twenty-eight men alleged that they were subjected to child sexual abuse by McGuire, perpetrated between the 1960s and 2004. McGuire allegedly developed a pattern of persuading a family to let their teenage son intern with him and then sexually abused the boy. He has been described by The Cambridge Encyclopedia of the Jesuits as "perhaps the most egregious offender among American Jesuits".

Stories about McGuire abusing boys began to surface as early as the 1960s, when McGuire was living in Europe. Church officials in Germany and Austria reported concerns over McGuire's behavior to his superiors in the United States. As a result, the Jesuits recalled McGuire from Europe. He was nevertheless assigned a teaching position at Loyola Academy, where he would molest students who later filed lawsuits and received significant monetary settlements due to these crimes.

Although four of McGuire's provincial superiors became aware of sexual abuse allegations against him, no action was taken by the order until 1991 when he was required to undergo six months' medical treatment at an institution in Pennsylvania specializing in sexual disorders. McGuire withdrew from the treatment early, but his provincial superior allowed him to return to work with the only limitation being that he could no longer travel overnight with anyone under the age of 21. In 1993, McGuire was again removed from his ministry as a result of allegations of sexually abusing a boy in the San Francisco Bay Area. Responding to these events, Mother Teresa wrote to the Jesuits in 1994 urging his reinstatement and asserting that the allegations were untrue. McGuire was allowed to return to work.

In the early 2000s, several lawsuits were filed against McGuire and his superiors by his alleged victims or their families. The lawsuits prompted a criminal investigation, leading to criminal charges filed by District Attorney Phil Koss in Walworth County, Wisconsin. McGuire was convicted after a jury trial in 2006 of five felonies related to the sexual assault of two Loyola Academy students that occurred in the 1960s. He was sentenced to seven years in prison followed by twenty years of probation. In 2009, while appealing that conviction, he was convicted on federal charges that he molested another boy on trips to Austria and Switzerland, leading to a 25-year prison term. His Wisconsin conviction was upheld on appeal by the state's Supreme Court in 2010.

In 2012, the Chicago Jesuit official who had received Mother Teresa's letter in 1994, Fr Bradley M. Schaeffer, issued a statement apologizing for his failings, stating, "I deeply regret that my actions were not enough to prevent him from engaging in these horrific crimes". Documents supporting claims that the Chicago Province of the Jesuits concealed McGuire's crimes over forty years contributed in the order paying $19.6 million in 2013 to settle lawsuits brought by six sexual abuse victims. A further lawsuit was filed in 2019 against the Jesuits alleging that it failed to remove him from his post when it should have.

== See also ==
- Sexual abuse scandal in the Society of Jesus
- Jesuits in the United States
