= James Talbot (rapist) =

American Jesuit priest and criminal

James Talbot (1937/1938 – February 28, 2025) SJ was an American Jesuit priest, teacher, and coach who was convicted of raping multiple students over a period of several decades. His crimes are one of several that are collectively known as the Catholic Archdiocese of Boston sex abuse scandal, and part of the larger Catholic Church sex abuse cases in the United States.

== Abuse ==
In the 1970s, while serving as a hockey, soccer, and wrestling coach as well as a history teacher at Boston College High School (BC High), Talbot was accused of rape and other charges of sexual misconduct. In response, the Jesuits chose to move him to another high school, Cheverus High School, in Portland, Maine. Talbot transferred from BCHS to Cheverus in 1980, where he remained until 1998, again in the role of history teacher and soccer coach in an all-male school. In 1998 a student brought information to the bishop that her brother had been molested by Talbot, who by that time was molesting yet another student.

== Legal cases and prison ==
In 2005, at the age of 67, he was convicted of several counts of abuse during his tenure at Boston College High School, and served six years in prison for the crimes. In a civil suit, 13 victims who sued the Society of Jesus and the high school received a $5.2 million settlement. At the time of his release, proceedings to laicize Talbot were still incomplete. Talbot was released from prison for the BCHS charges in 2011, only to be charged for crimes committed at Cheverus. He was removed from the clerical state in 2013. In 2017, Talbot was extradited to Maine, and in 2018 at age 80, was sentenced to two concurrent three-year sentences after pleading guilty to both gross sexual assault and unlawful sexual contact. These charges both centered around the raping a nine-year-old boy at a church in Freeport, Maine. Between prison stays, Talbot resided at Vianney Renewal Center, a Catholic-faith based treatment center in Missouri run by the Congregation of the Servants of the Paraclete to aid priests and brothers with personal difficulties. He immediately began serving his 2018 sentence following his guilty plea. Talbot admitted to abusing "88 or 89" students altogether.

== Media depiction ==
One case is depicted in the movie Spotlight, which starred Michael Keaton in the role of Boston Globe editor Walter V. Robinson, who attended BCHS and who broke the story of the Catholic Archdiocese of Boston sex abuse scandal in 2002.

== Death ==
Talbot died at a hospice center in St. Louis, Missouri, on February 28, 2025, at the age of 87. His death was not reported until three months after it happened.
