= The Catholic Catechism (Hardon) =

1975 book by John Hardon

First edition (publ. Doubleday)

The Catholic Catechism is a major volume on the teachings of the Catholic Church written by John Hardon and published in 1975. It was written at the request of Pope Paul VI to counter the emergence of perceived rampant liberalism after the Second Vatican Council (1962-1965). By 1977, 100,000 copies had been sold.

The Catholic Catechism was a significant work in the sense that it essentially brought modern Vatican II Catholic teaching and faith into one book, unlike any other before, and was a precursor to the Catechism of the Catholic Church, which is the official codified teaching of the Catholic Church, written by Joseph Cardinal Ratzinger (later Pope Benedict XVI) and promulgated by Pope John Paul II in 1992.

Hardon's Catholic Catechism remains a standard work on Catholic orthodoxy even to this day.

The book is published with the nihil obstat and imprimatur.

== Reviews ==
- L.H.C. (January 1979). "Short Notices". The Heythrop Journal. 20 (1): 113–114. doi:10.1111/j.1468-2265.1979.tb00201.x. ISSN 0018-1196.
- Dooley, Eugene A. (July 1975). "Non-Fiction". Best Sellers. Vol. 35, no. 4. pp. 107–108. ISSN 0005-9625.
- Dubay, Thomas (December 1975). "Book Reviews". Theological Studies. 36 (4): 798–800. doi:10.1177/004056397503600425. ISSN 0040-5639. S2CID 170387380.
- Kniefel, Theo (March 1980). "Book Reviews". Journal of Theology for Southern Africa. 30: 73–75. ISSN 0047-2867.
- Lawler, Michael G. (December 1976). "Book Reviews". Cross and Crown. Vol. 29, no. 4. pp. 413–415. ISSN 0011-1910.
- Nichols, Kevin (March 1982). "Reviews". Religious Studies. 18 (1): 128–131. doi:10.1017/S0034412500013706. ISSN 0034-4125.
