= Frye Island, Maine =

- Town
- Logo
- Motto: "A Community Managed By Its Owners"
- Location in Cumberland County and the state of Maine.
- Coordinates: 43°50′14″N 70°31′27″W
- Country: United States
- State: Maine
- County: Cumberland
- Incorporated: July 1, 1998
- Named for: Joseph Frye

Area
  - Total: 1.60 sq mi (4.14 km^{2})
  - Land: 1.34 sq mi (3.47 km^{2})
  - Water: 0.26 sq mi (0.67 km^{2})
- Elevation: 364 ft (111 m)

Population (2020)
  - Total: 32
  - Density: 24/sq mi (9.2/km^{2})
- Time zone: UTC−5 (Eastern (EST))
  - Summer (DST): UTC−4 (EDT)
- ZIP Code: 04071
- Area code: 207
- FIPS code: 23-27025
- GNIS feature ID: 2378261
- Website: www.fryeislandtown.org

Frye Island is an island town in Cumberland County, Maine, United States. Located in Sebago Lake, the island is accessed via a public car ferry from Raymond Neck, or by private boat. Frye Island is vacant from November through April, and the ferry does not operate during that time due to thick ice blocking its route during the winter. It is part of the Portland-South Portland-Biddeford metropolitan area. The town had a population of 32 at the 2020 census.

== History ==
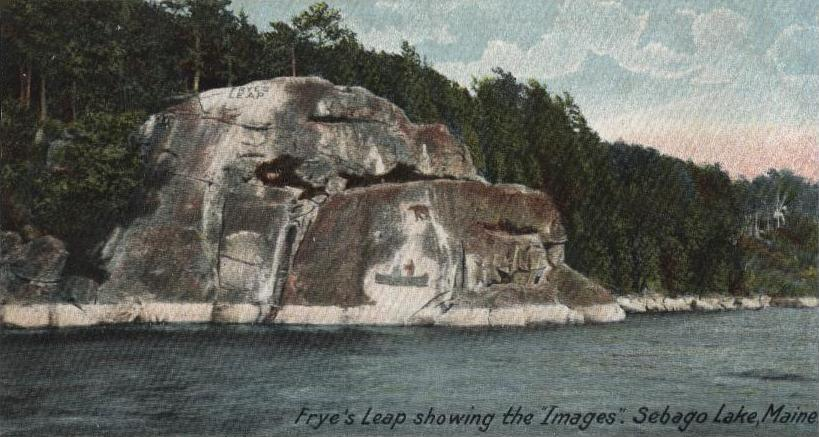
Frye's Leap c. 1905

It was included in the 1750 grant made by the Massachusetts General Court to Captain Moses Pearson, Captain Humphrey Hobbs and their respective companies of soldiers for services during the French and Indian Wars. Pearsontown Plantation was first settled in the 1750s, then incorporated as the town of Standish on November 30, 1785. Frye Island, named for Captain Joseph Frye, seceded to become a separate town on July 1, 1998.

A popular legend on Frye Island tells of Captain Frye and his escape from a tribe of Native Americans in Portland. While being chased, Captain Frye came upon a large rock, now known as Frye's Leap, and had no way of going around it. Captain Frye made the decision to jump and swim across the channel to Frye Island. Long afterwards, Frye's Leap became a popular spot for people to recreate the famous jump. At one point, the sharp and dangerous cliffs became so popular for jumping that numerous, often serious injuries were being reported each summer. And in 2012, a man even died while attempting to dive off the rockface. This in turn caused local law enforcement and the leap's landowners to take action, and multiple No Trespassing signs were placed along the cliff edge. On hot summer days, the area is often patrolled by the Maine Warden Service, in order to ward off potential jumpers.

Frye Island is composed of approximately 1,000 mostly wooded acres interlaced with 22 miles (35 km) of dirt roads. The speed limit is 20 mph (32 km/h) and the most popular way of transportation on the island is by golf cart rather than car. Many of the homes are built on waterfront property overlooking Sebago Lake. Real estate prices on Frye Island have skyrocketed over the past decade or so, and many of the waterfront homes assess at extremely high values. On the island, there are two marinas, various athletic and recreational facilities, several public beaches, a convenience store, an ice cream stand, a restaurant with a bar, and a golf club with a lounge that is open to the public.

The island is accessed by twin 65-foot (20 m) single-deck car ferries that are owned and operated by the town. They run every half-hour from early in the morning until late in the evening during July and August, reduced somewhat in off-season. The trip takes about 7 minutes. Walk-on passengers are permitted, but there is no passenger parking at the ferry landings. From 2018 to 2020, Frye Island attempted to secede from Maine School Administrative District 6, but the Maine Supreme Judicial Court overruled that effort.

== Traditions ==
Independence Day is the most celebrated holiday on the island, signified by its well known golf cart parade and fireworks display. People from all around Sebago gather to view the fireworks, either by boat or from the beach. Each year a walk and run is held among many other festivities as well.

== Geography ==
Frye Island is approximately 1.5 miles (2.4 km) wide (at the widest point) and 2.5 miles (4.0 km) long. According to the United States Census Bureau, the town has a total area of 1.60 square miles (4.14 km^{2}), of which 1.34 square miles (3.47 km^{2}) is land and 0.26 square miles (0.67 km^{2}) is water. Frye Island is situated in Sebago Lake.

== Demographics ==
Historical population
Census	Pop.	Note	%±
2010	5		—
2020	32		540.0%
U.S. Decennial Census

=== 2010 census ===
As of the census of 2010, there were five people, two households, and two families residing in the town. The population density was 3.7 inhabitants per square mile (1.4/km^{2}). There were 481 housing units at an average density of 359.0 per square mile (138.6/km^{2}). The racial makeup of the town was 100.0% White.

There were two households, of which 50.0% had children under the age of 18 living with them and 100.0% were married couples living together. Of all households 0.0% were made up of individuals. The average household size was 2.50 and the average family size was 2.50.

The median age in the town was 30.8 years. Of residents, 20% were under the age of 18; 0.0% were between the ages of 18 and 24; 40% were from 25 to 44; 0.0% were from 45 to 64; and 40% were 65 years of age or older. The gender makeup of the town was 60.0% male and 40.0% female.
