= Hollis, Maine =

Town in Maine, United States

- Town
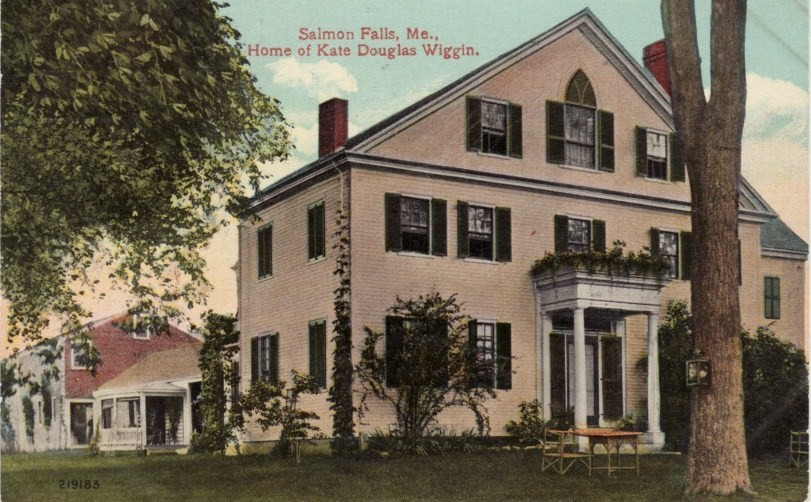
- Quillcote, c. 1916

- Seal

- Location within Maine Location within the United States
- Coordinates: 43°37′50″N 70°37′35″W
- Country: United States
- State: Maine
- County: York
- Incorporated: 1798

Government
  - Type: Town meeting

Area
  - Total: 32.99 sq mi (85.44 km^{2})
  - Land: 32.01 sq mi (82.91 km^{2})
  - Water: 0.98 sq mi (2.54 km^{2})
- Elevation: 220 ft (67 m)

Population (2020)
  - Total: 4,745
  - Density: 148/sq mi (57.2/km^{2})
- Time zone: UTC-5 (Eastern (EST))
  - Summer (DST): UTC-4 (EDT)
- ZIP Code: 04042
- Area code: 207
- FIPS code: 23-33665
- GNIS feature ID: 582523
- Website: www.hollismaine.org

Hollis is a town in York County, Maine, United States. The population was 4,745 at the 2020 census. Hollis is a rural bedroom community of Portland and is part of the Portland-South Portland-Biddeford metropolitan area.

== History ==
The town of Hollis was originally called Little Falls Plantation, which also encompassed all of the town of Dayton and a small part of Limington, namely the area south of the Little Ossipee River. It was bought in 1664 by Major William Phillips from Hobinowell and Mogg Hegon, sagamores of the local Abenaki people. In 1728, the Massachusetts General Court ordered that a combination trading post and stockaded blockhouse be constructed on the Saco River to conduct trade with the Native Americans. It was made crudely of logs and equipped with a cannon. Ten men and a sergeant garrisoned it.

John and Andrew Gordon tried to settle the land in 1754, but were driven away by the Native Americans. On March 27, 1781, the first recorded plantation meeting took place and Joseph Chadbourne was elected moderator. By 1790 the population had grown to 607. The first vote for state office came in 1791, when Little Falls gave John Hancock 27 votes. In 1798, Little Falls was incorporated into Phillipsburg, named in honor of Major Phillips. The first town meeting took place on September 27, 1798, at the home of Stephen Hopkinson. The moderator was Joseph Chadbourne. In 1810 a committee was put together to rename the town, headed by Colonel Isaac Lane and Captain Eben Cleaves. It was finally decided upon the name Hollis. The reasoning behind the name is not known; it is thought to have been inspired by Hollis, New Hampshire, or possibly by the Duke of Newcastle, whose family name was Holles.

Farmers grew corn, potatoes and hay in the sandy loam. Water powered mills were built along the Saco River at Hollis village, Bar Mills, Moderation Falls (opposite West Buxton), North Hollis and Bonny Eagle Falls. These included lumber mills, a spool factory, a woodturning mill, a wooden box factory and the Saco River Woolen Company. The Portland and Rochester Railroad crossed the southern part of the town.

Hollis was the closest community to the epicenter of a 4.0 magnitude earthquake felt by many across New England on October 16, 2012.

== Geography ==
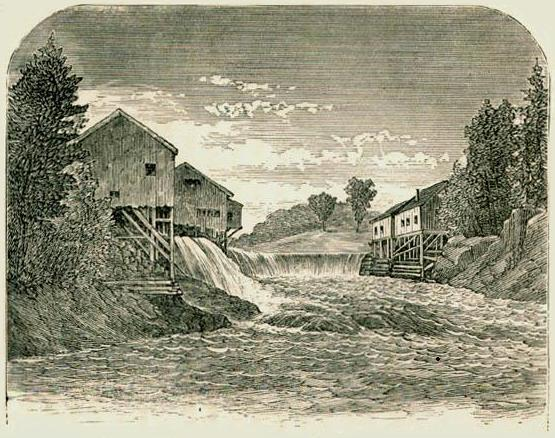
Bonny Eagle Falls in 1869

According to the United States Census Bureau, the town has a total area of 32.99 square miles (85.44 km^{2}), of which 32.01 square miles (82.91 km^{2}) is land and 0.98 square miles (2.54 km^{2}) is water. Hollis is drained by Cook's Brook and the Saco River.

Hollis borders the towns of Limington and Standish to the north, Buxton to the east, Dayton to the south, Lyman to the southwest and Waterboro to its west.

=== Climate ===
Hollis has a humid continental climate (Köppen Dfb). Winters are cold and snowy, whereas summers are mild to warm with frequent rainfall.

Climate data for Hollis, Maine, 1991–2020 normals, extremes 1994–present
Month	Jan	Feb	Mar	Apr	May	Jun	Jul	Aug	Sep	Oct	Nov	Dec	Year
Record high °F (°C)	65 (18)	67 (19)	85 (29)	93 (34)	94 (34)	99 (37)	98 (37)	98 (37)	94 (34)	85 (29)	76 (24)	70 (21)	99 (37)
Mean maximum °F (°C)	50.9 (10.5)	51.9 (11.1)	60.9 (16.1)	78.1 (25.6)	88.7 (31.5)	90.2 (32.3)	91.8 (33.2)	89.6 (32.0)	86.3 (30.2)	74.5 (23.6)	65.1 (18.4)	53.9 (12.2)	94.1 (34.5)
Mean daily maximum °F (°C)	29.4 (−1.4)	32.6 (0.3)	40.8 (4.9)	53.8 (12.1)	66.0 (18.9)	75.0 (23.9)	80.3 (26.8)	78.8 (26.0)	70.6 (21.4)	57.8 (14.3)	45.7 (7.6)	34.9 (1.6)	55.5 (13.0)
Daily mean °F (°C)	18.6 (−7.4)	20.8 (−6.2)	29.8 (−1.2)	41.7 (5.4)	53.3 (11.8)	62.8 (17.1)	68.4 (20.2)	66.5 (19.2)	58.2 (14.6)	46.4 (8.0)	35.7 (2.1)	25.4 (−3.7)	44.0 (6.7)
Mean daily minimum °F (°C)	7.8 (−13.4)	8.9 (−12.8)	18.8 (−7.3)	29.6 (−1.3)	40.5 (4.7)	50.6 (10.3)	56.5 (13.6)	54.1 (12.3)	45.9 (7.7)	35.0 (1.7)	25.8 (−3.4)	15.9 (−8.9)	32.4 (0.3)
Mean minimum °F (°C)	−14.1 (−25.6)	−10.5 (−23.6)	−4.0 (−20.0)	19.1 (−7.2)	27.5 (−2.5)	39.2 (4.0)	47.0 (8.3)	43.4 (6.3)	31.4 (−0.3)	23.4 (−4.8)	11.0 (−11.7)	−3.6 (−19.8)	−17.5 (−27.5)
Record low °F (°C)	−28 (−33)	−26 (−32)	−16 (−27)	10 (−12)	24 (−4)	30 (−1)	42 (6)	37 (3)	24 (−4)	16 (−9)	−3 (−19)	−23 (−31)	−28 (−33)
Average precipitation inches (mm)	3.58 (91)	3.63 (92)	4.57 (116)	4.86 (123)	3.94 (100)	4.45 (113)	4.12 (105)	3.83 (97)	4.02 (102)	5.75 (146)	4.47 (114)	4.89 (124)	52.11 (1,323)
Average snowfall inches (cm)	19.8 (50)	20.4 (52)	15.4 (39)	3.7 (9.4)	0.1 (0.25)	0.0 (0.0)	0.0 (0.0)	0.0 (0.0)	0.0 (0.0)	0.4 (1.0)	3.4 (8.6)	17.7 (45)	80.9 (205.25)
Average extreme snow depth inches (cm)	18.1 (46)	22.6 (57)	20.2 (51)	9.9 (25)	0.1 (0.25)	0.0 (0.0)	0.0 (0.0)	0.0 (0.0)	0.0 (0.0)	0.5 (1.3)	2.5 (6.4)	12.6 (32)	25.5 (65)
Average precipitation days (≥ 0.01 in)	11.6	9.8	10.8	11.8	13.5	13.8	11.7	10.3	9.2	11.8	11.6	12.1	138.0
Average snowy days (≥ 0.1 in)	8.6	7.4	5.7	2.1	0.1	0.0	0.0	0.0	0.0	0.1	2.1	6.8	32.9
Source 1: NOAA
Source 2: National Weather Service (mean maxima/minima, snow depth 2006–2020)

== Demographics ==
Historical population
Census	Pop.	Note	%±
1800	1,097		—
1810	1,427		30.1%
1820	1,762		23.5%
1830	2,272		28.9%
1840	2,363		4.0%
1850	2,683		13.5%
1860	1,683		−37.3%
1870	1,541		−8.4%
1880	1,542		0.1%
1890	1,278		−17.1%
1900	1,274		−0.3%
1910	1,284		0.8%
1920	1,092		−15.0%
1930	1,034		−5.3%
1940	1,111		7.4%
1950	1,214		9.3%
1960	1,195		−1.6%
1970	1,560		30.5%
1980	2,892		85.4%
1990	3,573		23.5%
2000	4,114		15.1%
2010	4,281		4.1%
2020	4,745		10.8%
U.S. Decennial Census

=== 2010 census ===
As of the census of 2010, there were 4,281 people, 1,668 households, and 1,216 families living in the town. The population density was 133.7 inhabitants per square mile (51.6/km^{2}). There were 1,801 housing units at an average density of 56.3 per square mile (21.7/km^{2}). The racial makeup of the town was 97.9% White, 0.2% African American, 0.4% Native American, 0.4% Asian, 0.1% from other races, and 1.0% from two or more races. Hispanic or Latino of any race were 0.4% of the population.

There were 1,668 households, of which 33.5% had children under the age of 18 living with them, 58.2% were married couples living together, 8.9% had a female householder with no husband present, 5.8% had a male householder with no wife present, and 27.1% were non-families. 18.5% of all households were made up of individuals, and 5.6% had someone living alone who was 65 years of age or older. The average household size was 2.56 and the average family size was 2.89.

The median age in the town was 40.9 years. 22% of residents were under the age of 18; 7.1% were between the ages of 18 and 24; 26.9% were from 25 to 44; 33.5% were from 45 to 64; and 10.5% were 65 years of age or older. The gender makeup of the town was 50.4% male and 49.6% female.

=== 2000 census ===
As of the census of 2000, there were 4,114 people, 1,507 households, and 1,139 families living in the town. The population density was 128.5 inhabitants per square mile (49.6/km^{2}). There were 1,592 housing units at an average density of 49.7 per square mile (19.2/km^{2}). The racial makeup of the town was 98.81% White, 0.15% African American, 0.12% Native American, 0.15% Asian, 0.10% Pacific Islander, 0.07% from other races, and 0.61% from two or more races. Hispanic or Latino of any race were 0.53% of the population.

There were 1,507 households, out of which 38.1% had children under the age of 18 living with them, 62.7% were married couples living together, 8.3% had a female householder with no husband present, and 24.4% were non-families. 16.3% of all households were made up of individuals, and 5.2% had someone living alone who was 65 years of age or older. The average household size was 2.73 and the average family size was 3.06.

In the town, the age distribution of the population shows 26.8% under the age of 18, 7.8% from 18 to 24, 32.7% from 25 to 44, 25.1% from 45 to 64, and 7.7% who were 65 years of age or older. The median age was 37 years. For every 100 females, there were 98.5 males. For every 100 females age 18 and over, there were 96.1 males.

The median income for a household in the town was $48,846, and the median income for a family was $53,621. Males had a median income of $35,064 versus $25,510 for females. The per capita income for the town was $19,065. About 4.6% of families and 6.6% of the population were below the poverty line, including 9.3% of those under age 18 and 10.6% of those age 65 or over.

== Economy ==
With a population slightly above 4,000 and its proximity to Portland, Hollis is growing fast. Many residents commute to jobs in Portland, South Portland, Saco, Biddeford, and Sanford. The few large businesses in Hollis include Eagle Industries, a precision sheet metal shop that employs about 35 and used to also be the main sponsor of FIRST Robotics Competition Team BERT 133 from Bonny Eagle High School. There is also a bottling plant for Poland Spring Water. Many of the local businesses are family-run and well-established in the community.

== Education ==
Elementary students in Hollis attend Hollis Elementary School, while middle and high school students attend Bonny Eagle Middle School and Bonny Eagle High School respectively. Hollis is located within Maine School Administrative District 6.

Paul Penna is the Superintendent of Schools. Trevor Hustus is the chairman of the board.

== Earthquake ==
At 7:12 pm local time, on October 16, 2012, an earthquake originally estimated as a 4.6 magnitude, then downgraded to a 4.0 struck Hollis, with its epicenter approximately 3 miles (5 km) west of the center of town. According to the U.S. Geological Survey, the quake occurred at a depth of 6.6 km (4.1 miles). Some residents reported cracked floors and walls, but there were no reports of major damage. There were reports of tremors felt in all six New England states and New York.

== Notable people ==
- Alias, hip-hop artist/producer
- Kate Douglas Wiggin, author
