= Souza-Baranowski Correctional Center =

Prison in Lancaster, Massachusetts

- Location in Massachusetts
- Location: Lancaster, Massachusetts, United States; 42°31′24″N 71°38′53″W
- Status: Operational
- Security class: Supermax
- Capacity: Operational Capacity: 1,410 Operational Occupancy: 48%
- Opened: September 30, 1998
- Managed by: Massachusetts Department of Correction
- Director: Superintendent Dean Gray

Souza-Baranowski Correctional Center (SBCC) is a supermax security prison in Lancaster, Massachusetts (though it receives mail through a post-office box in the town of Shirley). It is operated by the Massachusetts Department of Correction. It is close to the medium-security prison Massachusetts Correctional Institution – Shirley, which is directly to the north over the town border. Souza-Baranowski opened on September 30, 1998. As of January 6, 2020 SBCC housed 672 inmates in general population beds.

The prison is named in honor of a corrections officer, James Souza, 29, and an instructor Alfred Baranowski, 54, who were shot in July 1972 by an inmate whose wife had smuggled in handguns into what was then the Norfolk Prison Colony.

Since the closure of Massachusetts Correctional Institution – Cedar Junction in 2023, Souza-Baranowski is the only post-conviction maximum-security state prison in Massachusetts. The Federal Medical Center, Devens operates at all security levels, including maximum.

== Incidents ==
A riot involving 46 inmates on January 9, 2017, was triggered after they were denied showers before returning to their cells from exercise.

On January 10, 2020, an officer was surrounded in the N1 unit (north side) and severely injured. Three other officers were taken to the hospital, six inmates were immediately moved to other facilities, and criminal charges were filed against 16 inmates. In complaints and a lawsuit which triggered an investigation by state legislators, inmates alleged that corrections officers retaliated in the following weeks, including against uninvolved inmates. The complaints included unprovoked beatings and use of stun guns, positional torture, ripping out of hair, underfeeding, confiscation of all clothing, deprivation of personal property, denial of access to lawyers and legal paperwork, failure to follow procedure by videotaping raids and documenting injuries, and use of personnel from other facilities who hid their identities. Abuse allegations continued into October.

On February 11, 2020, an officer was doused with liquid and grabbed through a food slot, and then the attacking inmate set items in his room on fire.

During the COVID-19 pandemic in Massachusetts, inmates were only allowed out of cells in small groups to shower and make phone calls. Under these conditions, two inmates were stabbed in a fight on April 6, 2020.

On December 12, 2025, state prosecutors in the office of the Massachusetts attorney general filed charges against two correctional officers, Stephen Cobb and Craig Lussier, for allegedly beating an inmate restrained to medical equipment, in retaliation to an alleged May 2023 beating within the correctional center. Prosecutors alleged that the two correctional officers entered the medical examination room and began to assault the inmate, causing vibrations strong enough to knock a picture off the wall.

== Notable inmates ==
=== Current ===
- Alfred Gaynor – Convicted serial killer and rapist
- Philip Chism – Convicted of murdering his high-school math teacher Colleen Ritzer
- Brian Walshe – Convicted of murdering his wife, Ana Walshe

=== Former ===
- Joseph Druce – Convicted of killing one man and for later killing John Geoghan
- John Geoghan – Priest convicted of assault and battery; was murdered in 2003
- Aaron Josef Hernandez – Convicted of killing Odin Lloyd; hanged himself in 2017
