= Maine School Administrative District 6 =

School district in Maine, United States

Coordinates: 43°43′N 70°35′W

Maine School Administrative District 6 (MSAD 6) is a school district in Maine, United States. It covers the towns of Buxton, Hollis, Standish, Limington, and Frye Island.

== Schools ==
=== High schools ===
- Bonny Eagle High School (Standish)

=== Middle schools ===
- Bonny Eagle Middle School (Buxton)

=== Elementary schools ===
- Buxton Center Elementary School (Buxton)
- Edna Libby Elementary School (Standish)
- George E Jack School (Standish)
- H B Emery Junior Memorial School (Limington)
- Hollis Elementary School (Hollis)
- Steep Falls Elementary School (Standish)
