= Mobile phones in prison =

In most jurisdictions, prison inmates are forbidden from possessing mobile phones due to their ability to communicate with the outside world and other security issues. Mobile phones are one of the most smuggled items into prisons. They provide inmates the ability to make and receive unauthorized phone calls, send email and text messages, use social media, and follow news pertaining to their case, among other forbidden uses.

== Reasons cell phones are prohibited ==
Security concerns are often cited for why cellphones are prohibited in prisons.

Cellphones in prisons have been used to organize work stoppages for prison labor between prisons. Forced penal labor in the United States is a common practice.

In the United States, prison phone calls represent one of the few ways that prisoners can connect with family and loved ones in the outside world. However, these calls can be prohibitively expensive, a situation which has sparked controversy in light of the fact that they represent a source of profit for private prisons. Some have argued that this profit motive plays a key role in cell phone bans in prisons.

== Methods of smuggling ==
Most mobile phones are smuggled in by prison staff, who often do not have to go through security as rigorously as visitors. Security of staff is often less intense because this would be time-consuming on the part of the staff, and unionized prison employees are paid for this time, which increases the overall cost of operations. Additionally, prison staff are often reluctant to search their co-workers thoroughly to avoid workplace tension and morale issues.

More rarely, mobile phones are smuggled in by visitors, who must undergo tougher security checks, by inmates who are granted temporary leaves of absence, or by outsiders who establish contact with inmates alongside the prison fence and/or deliver them using drones.

Once inside prison walls, the devices end up in the hands of inmates who purchase them with cash, which is also contraband in most prisons. Black market prices vary by prison and can be up to US$1000.

== Uses by prisoners ==
While some prisoners use their mobile devices simply for harmless communication or web browsing, others use them for criminal activity. These may include gang control, taunting witnesses, planning escapes from custody, or arranging other serious crimes.

Prisoners may also use smartphones to gather intelligence on prison staff and coordinate clandestine activity within the facility.

Not all inmates use mobile phones for harmful purposes. Many inmates use them to hold conversations with family and friends.

== United Kingdom ==
In the United Kingdom, prisoners are prohibited from possessing mobile phones, and all authorised telephone communications must be made through approved prison systems. The cost of such calls has been a recurring concern among prisoners and their families, particularly where contact with children or vulnerable relatives is important for rehabilitation and wellbeing.

Research from the Prison Reform Trust notes that "some prisons allow a short daily call free of charge, while others require payment after the first few minutes", highlighting inconsistency across establishments. The Children and Young People’s Centre for Justice has reported that “to call a landline from prison costs around 7 pence per minute at peak times, and calls to a mobile phone may cost around 13 pence per minute,” which can place a financial strain on families. According to Inside Time, prison payphone charges were halved in 2018, yet campaigners have continued to describe call costs as disproportionately high compared to public rates.

To mitigate these costs, a number of independent UK services have emerged that provide local-rate or freephone numbers for families of prisoners, enabling calls to be received at standard landline rates while remaining compliant with prison telephony rules. Charitable and informational websites such as Unseen Victims list several of these services, such as Cheap Prison Calls and Phone Savvy, which provide local-rate number options for families wishing to maintain contact within the existing regulatory framework.

== Combating mobile phones in prisons ==
Laws have been passed in various jurisdictions, placing penalties on inmates who possess mobile devices as well as staff who smuggle them in. Inmate penalties range from loss of privileges and behavior credits to additional sentencing. Staff penalties range from disciplinary action to job loss to criminal charges.

Consideration has been given to using cell phone jammers inside of prison walls to render them ineffective. The practice of jamming cell phone signals is illegal in the United States. Exceptions to this law have been considered for prisons, though there is concern that a cell phone could be a guard's lifeline in a crisis, and other rescuers may need to use them for communication.

Some places are using an experimental technology called managed communications that blocks the communications of inmates while continuing to allow that of others. This Managed Access System (MAS) technology was first deployed at Mississippi State Penitentiary in 2010 by Tecore Networks.

Special dogs have been used to sniff for cell phones coming into prison walls. Mobile phones have a unique scent, and these dogs have been trained to detect it.

In 2017, American company Securus Technologies announced an investment of more than $40 million in "Wireless Containment Solutions," a system that creates a local cellular network inside a prison requiring all phones on the network to be screened and approved.

Another solution is the use of ferromagnetic cell phone detectors. This technology detects the presence of the ferrous metal components (antenna, vibrator, speaker) that are in cell phones. The reliance is then not on the location of signals, but in the recognition of the physical phone itself which cannot be masked by internalizing or hiding on the person.

== Specific incidents ==
- In 2010, Robert Johnson, a prison guard at Lee Correctional Institution in Bishopville, South Carolina, was shot six times by a gunman hired by an inmate using a contraband cell phone. In 2013, the FCC suggested prisons be allowed to manage cell phone network access which would allow only authorized phones to access the network. However, the movement did not pass.
- In 2015, prison guards Romero Nobrega in Brazil found a cat that was used to smuggle cell phones into the prison. Four phones, four chargers and seven cards were found on it, and the prison administration carried out an unsuccessful search.
- In Ireland, 648 phones were smuggled into jails in 2016, despite heightened security measures.
- In the UK, 20,000 mobile phones and sim cards were recovered as prison contraband in 2016. In 2017, a prison in Bristol added telephones and computers which were not connected to the internet into the prison cells in an attempt to combat illegal mobile phone usage. The UK Parliament passed a law which would allow mobile phone operators to jam cell phone signals in prisons later that year. The legislation also enabled prison officers to use devices which detect mobile phone usage.
- In 2017, jails in Scotland implemented plans to block active phones within prisons through network monitoring. Between 2013 and 2017, 1,500 mobile phones or component parts were found in Scottish prisons.
