= Boston Strangler (disambiguation) =

The Boston Strangler is the name given to the presumed murderer of 13 women in Greater Boston during the early 1960s.

It (or closely related terms) may also refer to:

== People ==
- Albert DeSalvo to whom at least some of the crimes are attributed.
- George Nassar to whom DeSalvo allegedly confessed, but who some believe to have been responsible.
- Andrew Toney, Philadelphia 76ers player, so called because of his performances against Boston Celtics.

== Films ==
- The Strangler, made in 1964, starring Victor Buono.
- The Boston Strangler (film), made in 1968, highly fictionalised, starring Tony Curtis.
- Boston Strangler: The Untold Story, made in 2008. David Faustino played DeSalvo.
- Boston Strangler (film), made in 2023.

== Books ==
- The Boston Strangler by Gerold Frank on which the 1968 film is based.

== Music ==
- "The Boston Strangler" a track on Macbre's album Sinister Slaughter (1993).
- The Boston Stanglers, a Boston Hardcore band.
