= Matt Ruskin =

American film writer, director, producer and editor

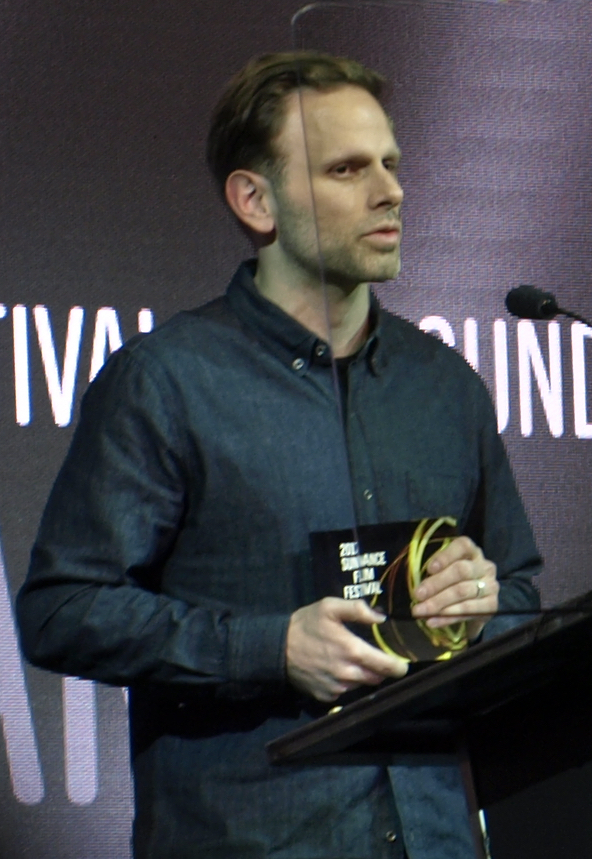
- Ruskin in 2017
- Born: Matthew Ruskin
- Education: New York University Tisch School of the Arts
- Occupations: Film director, screenwriter, producer, editor

Matt Ruskin is an American film director, writer, producer and editor best known for the critically acclaimed films Boston Strangler (2023) and Crown Heights (2017), which he wrote and directed, and The Infiltrator (2016), which he co-produced.

In 2023, Ruskin wrote and directed the film Boston Strangler, based on the true story of 1960s reporters Loretta McLaughlin and Jean Cole, played by Keira Knightly and Carrie Coon. McLaughlin was the first reporter to connect the murders and broke the story of the Boston Strangler. The film was produced by Ridley Scott for 20th Century Studios.

Ruskin wrote and directed Crown Heights, which won the Audience Award at the 2017 Sundance Film Festival and received a national theatrical release from Amazon and IFC. The film was adapted from This American Life and is based on the true story of Colin Warner, a Brooklyn teenager who was wrongfully convicted of murder, and his childhood friend Carl King, who devoted his life to proving Warner's innocence.

In 2016, Ruskin co-produced the film, The Infiltrator, starring Bryan Cranston, based on U.S. Customs agent Robert Mazur's memoir.

Ruskin's earlier work includes Booster (2012) which premiered at the SXSW Film Festival and received a Special Jury Prize. Ruskin directed The Hip Hop Project (2007) documentary, which was executive produced by Bruce Willis and Queen Latifah and received a national theatrical release from THINKFilm before airing on the Sundance Channel. Ruskin was a consulting producer on William Kunstler: Disturbing the Universe which premiered at the Sundance Film Festival in 2009.

Ruskin studied film production at New York University, Tisch School of the Arts and graduated as a University Honors Scholar. While at NYU, Ruskin worked for Darren Aronofsky on Requiem for a Dream and produced and directed The Glen of the Downs, a film about the first international environmental protest in Ireland, while studying under documentary filmmaker George Stoney.

== Filmography ==
Year	Title	Director	Writer	Producer	Editor	DoP
2001	Glen of the Downs	Yes	No	Yes	Yes	Yes
2006	The Hip Hop Project	Yes	No	Yes	Yes	No
2012	Booster	Yes	Yes	Yes	Yes	No
2017	Crown Heights	Yes	Yes	Yes	Uncredited	No
2023	Boston Strangler	Yes	Yes	No	Uncredited	No

Co-Producer

- A Call to Return: The Oxycontin Story (2006)
- The Boy (2015)
- 11:55 (2016)
- The Infiltrator (2016)

Production Assistant

- Requiem for a Dream (2000)

Consulting Producer

- William Kunstler: Disturbing the Universe (2009)

Editor

- Bob Dylan: Odds and Ends (2021)

== Awards and nominations ==
- Highlighted accolades received for Boston Strangler
  - 2023 Hollywood Critics Association TV Awards
    - Nominated for: Best Streaming Movie
- Highlighted accolades received for Crown Heights
  - 2018 Black Reel Awards
    - Won: Outstanding Independent Feature
  - 2018 Humanitas Prize
    - Won: Humanitas Prize
  - 2017 Sundance Film Festival
    - Won: Audience Award
    - Nominated: Grand Jury Prize
- Highlighted accolades received for Booster
  - 2012 Oldenburg Film Festival
    - Nominated: German Independence Award - Audience Award
  - 2012 SXSW Film Festival
    - Won: Special Grand Jury Prize
    - Nominated: Best Narrative Feature
    - Nominated: SXSW Competition Award
- Highlighted accolades received for The Hip Hop Project
  - 2007 Warsaw International Film Festival
    - Nominated: Competition 1-2 Award
  - 2006 Washington DC Independent Film Festival
    - Won: Special recognition
  - 2006 Heartland International Film Festival
    - Won: Crystal Heart Award
    - Won: Best Documentary Feature
  - 2006 Zurich Film Festival
    - Won: Audience Award
    - Nominated: Golden Eye Award
