= American Cinema Editors Awards 1969 =

19th ACE Eddie Awards
- Presented by: American Cinema Editors
- Date: March 15, 1969
- Site: Century Plaza Hotel, Los Angeles, California
- Hosted by: Jan Murray

Highlights
- Best Film: Bullitt

The 19th American Cinema Editors Awards, which were presented on Saturday, March 15, 1969, at The Century Plaza Hotel, honored the best editors in films and television. The award was hosted by comedian Jan Murray. For the first time in the ceremony's history, clips of each of the nominated films and television series were shown. No special awards were given out during the award ceremony.

== Nominees ==
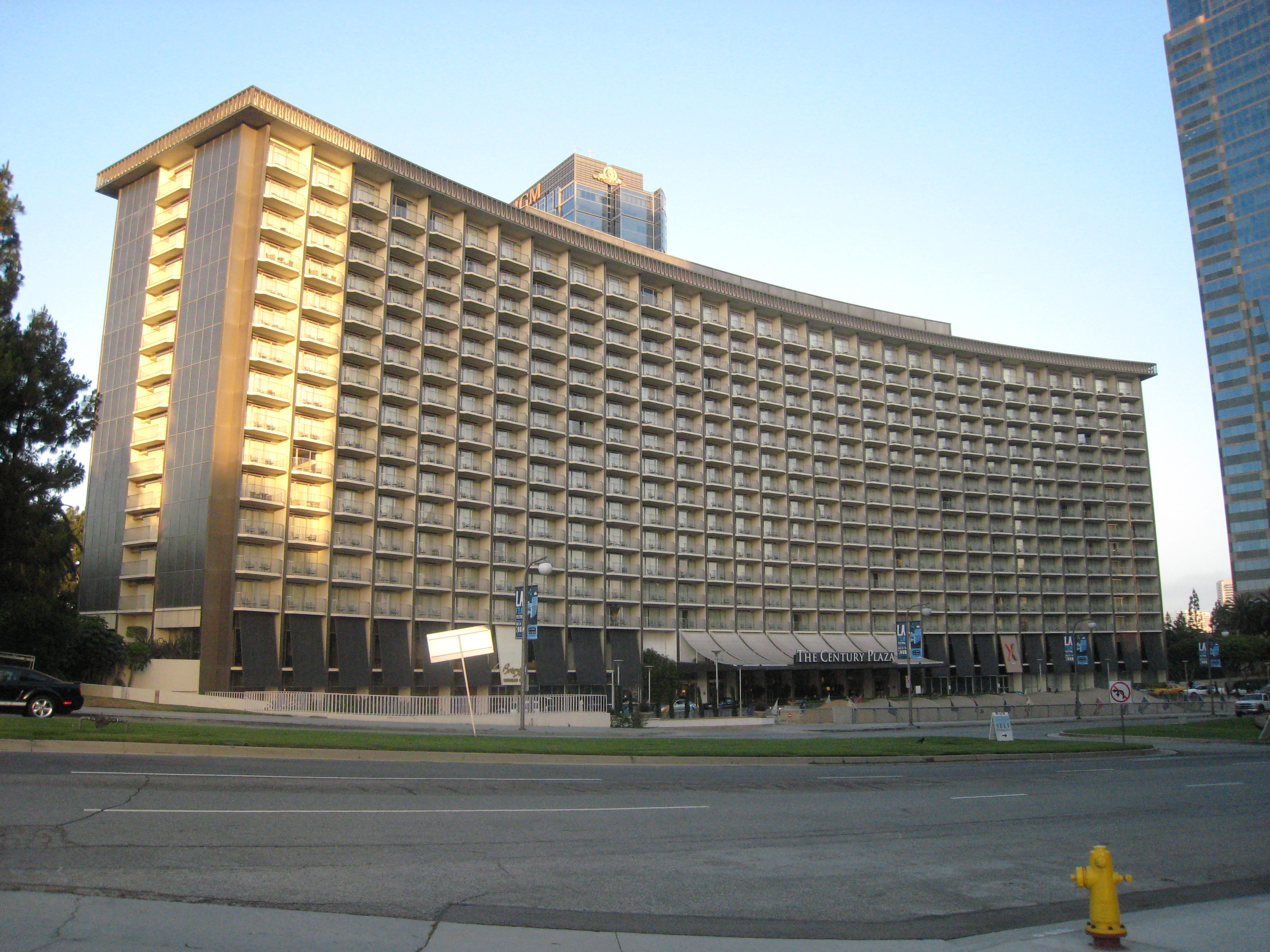
The Century Plaza Hotel, the site of the 1969 Eddies.

Best Edited Feature Film	Best Edited Television Program
Bullitt – Frank P. Keller; 'The Boston Strangler – Marion Rothman; Funny Girl – William Sands, Robert Swink, and Maury Winetrobe; The Odd Couple – Frank Bracht; Oliver! – Ralph Kemplen	The Outcasts: "Take Your Lover In The Ring" – Norman Colbert; The Bob Hope Christmas Special – Richard K. Brockway, Donn Cambern, John Fuller, Igo Kantor; The High Chaparral: "Follow Your Heart" – George A. Gittens; Ironside: "Split Second to an Epitaph" – Edward W. Williams; Julia: "Mama's Man" – John Ehrin
