= Julian Soshnick =

American lawyer

- Born: August 17, 1932; Brooklyn, New York
- Died: August 8, 2004 (aged 71); Rockport, Massachusetts
- Occupation: Attorney at law
- Spouse: Martha

Julian Soshnick (August 17, 1932 – August 8, 2004) was assistant attorney general of Massachusetts, a trial lawyer and businessman. Born in Brooklyn, Soshnick graduated from high school in Manhattan at age 16. He then attended and graduated from Brandeis University and the Boston University School of Law. Drafted in 1957 and shipped to Germany, he served four years as an officer in the U.S. Army's Judge Advocate General's Corps.

Married to Martha in 1957, Soshnick has two children, Jo Anne and Jeffrey Adam, and one granddaughter Ella.

In the early 1960s, he was assistant attorney general of Massachusetts under Edward J. McCormack, and then under Edward Brooke. He was co-prosecuting attorney with John Bottomly during the 1964 Boston Strangler case. Soshnick later appeared in a cameo role in the 1968 movie The Boston Strangler. Subsequently, he continued in private practice as a trial lawyer. In 1971, he defended 400 Vietnam veterans that were arrested for protesting on the Lexington Green in Massachusetts.

He was instrumental in founding Analogic Corporation in 1967, and variously served as its vice president, legal counsel, director and long-term officer.

Julian Soshnick died of lung cancer on August 8, 2004, at the age of 71 at his home in Rockport, Massachusetts.
