= Boston Strangler (film) =

2023 film by Matt Ruskin

- Release poster
- Directed by: Matt Ruskin
- Written by: Matt Ruskin
- Produced by: Ridley Scott; Kevin J. Walsh; Michael Pruss; Josey McNamara; Tom Ackerley
- Starring: Keira Knightley; Carrie Coon; Alessandro Nivola; Chris Cooper
- Cinematography: Ben Kutchins
- Edited by: Anne McCabe
- Music by: Paul Leonard-Morgan
- Production companies: 20th Century Studios; Scott Free Productions; LuckyChap Entertainment
- Distributed by: Hulu
- Release date: March 17, 2023
- Running time: 112 minutes
- Country: United States
- Language: English

Boston Strangler is a 2023 American historical crime drama film written and directed by Matt Ruskin. It is based on the true story of the Boston Strangler, who, in the 1960s Boston, killed 14 women. The film stars Keira Knightley as Loretta McLaughlin, the reporter who broke the news for the Boston Record American, with Carrie Coon, Alessandro Nivola, Chris Cooper, Bill Camp, Morgan Spector, and David Dastmalchian as Albert DeSalvo.

Boston Strangler was released in the United States on March 17, 2023, by Hulu. It received mixed reviews from critics.

== Plot ==
In 1962, Boston Record American reporter Loretta McLaughlin investigates three cases of older women who were raped and murdered by strangulation in the Boston area. She confirms the victims all had stockings tied around their necks in a bow, probably connecting the crimes to a serial killer. The story angers Boston law enforcement as well as Loretta's boss, who plans to kill the report to protect the company.

When a fourth victim is found, Loretta and fellow reporter Jean Cole decide to continue the investigation. The two women endure rampant sexism in their workplace and society. Loretta's marriage is strained by her long hours and her family is harassed. While writing the articles, Loretta coins the name "the Boston Strangler".

A year later, a seventh woman named Sophie Clark is murdered. A neighbor encountered a man who could be the killer and she provides a vague description. Sophie was much younger than previous victims, which breaks the Strangler's pattern. Loretta and Jean later discover that the Boston Police Department is botching the investigation and not sharing information with other cities. Similar murders, like one committed in New York City by a man named Paul Dempsey, have been overlooked.

Albert DeSalvo, a suspect in the investigation, is taken into custody. Sophie's neighbor is asked to identify him in a line-up but she picks a different man, George Nassar. Despite this, in 1964, DeSalvo confesses to all 13 murders. Police do not have enough evidence to tie him to the murders, so he is instead convicted for earlier crimes of robbery and sexual offenses and sentenced to life imprisonment.

By 1965, Loretta learns from a police detective in Ann Arbor, Michigan, that there have been six murders there that are identical to the Boston Strangler's work. She travels to Ann Arbor and learns the most likely suspect is Daniel Marsh, an ex-boyfriend of a Strangler victim. Marsh is later arrested but refuses to cooperate with police. In 1973, DeSalvo calls Loretta and tells her to come to visiting hours the next day to hear his side of the story. Before Loretta can meet with him, he is stabbed to death by another prisoner.

Following an anonymous tip, Loretta meets with Harrison, a former patient at Bridgewater State Hospital. He reveals that DeSalvo, Marsh, and Nassar were all held in the same ward at the same time. Harrison also claims DeSalvo's confession was coached by Marsh and Nassar. Loretta visits Nassar in prison. He denies that he and Marsh coached DeSalvo but admits he hoped to claim the reward. He accuses Loretta and the media of creating a sensation around the Strangler and insinuates that there is more than one murderer but that the public does not want to come to terms with it.

Loretta and Jean create a theory that Paul Dempsey killed the first six older women in Boston before he moved to New York. Once Dempsey left Boston, copycat murders arose, resulting in the later victims being much younger. DeSalvo confessed to all 13 murders so Nassar could collect a $10,000 reward per victim. In return, Nassar arranged for DeSalvo to be represented by a high-profile lawyer F. Lee Bailey. DeSalvo was also deceived into believing he would get a million-dollar book deal that could support his family. The Record American publishes Loretta and Jean's theory.

An epilogue tells of Loretta becoming an award-winning medical reporter at The Boston Globe. Jean continued working as an investigative reporter for 30 years. She and Loretta remained close friends. Marsh was never charged with murder. Nassar never received a reward and is incorrectly said to still be in prison as of 2023. (Note: Shortly after the film's release, The New York Times reported that Nassar died in 2018, at the age of 86. His death was not publicly announced at the time.) In 2013, DNA evidence linked DeSalvo to the 13th murder but not the other 12.

== Cast ==
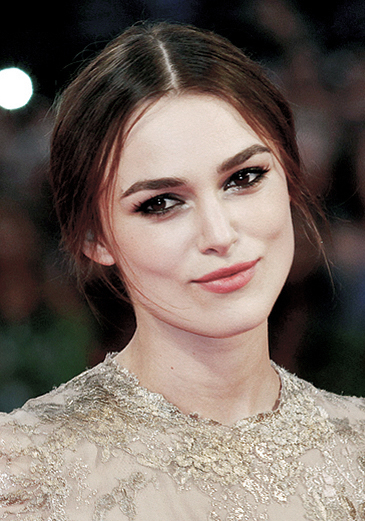
Keira Knightley portrays Loretta McLaughlin

- Keira Knightley as Loretta McLaughlin
- Carrie Coon as Jean Cole (Note: The real Cole was married as Jean Harris at the time.)
- Alessandro Nivola as Detective Conley
- David Dastmalchian as Albert DeSalvo
- Morgan Spector as James McLaughlin
- Bill Camp as Commissioner Edmund McNamara
- Chris Cooper as Jack MacLaine
- Robert John Burke as Eddie Holland
- Rory Cochrane as Detective DeLine
- Peter Gerety as Eddie Corsetti
- Luke Kirby as F. Lee Bailey
- Tamara Hickey as Ellie
- Charlie Thurston as Fritz
- Ryan Winkles as Daniel Marsh
- Greg Vrotsos as George Nassar
- Pamela Jayne Morgan as Anne Samans
- Pat Fitz as The Killer
- Johnny Serret as Television Crewman

== Production ==
Boston Strangler is a co-production between Scott Free Productions, LuckyChap Entertainment, and 20th Century Studios. It was written and directed by Matt Ruskin, and produced by Ridley Scott, Kevin J. Walsh, Michael Pruss, Tom Ackerley, and Josey McNamara. On October 4, 2021, Keira Knightley joined the cast. In November 2021, Carrie Coon, Alessandro Nivola, Chris Cooper, and David Dastmalchian were added to the cast. Robert John Burke and Morgan Spector were confirmed to star in early 2022.

Ben Kutchins served as the film's cinematographer. Filming began on December 6, 2021. A house in Belmont, Massachusetts, stood in for the home of reporter Loretta McLaughlin. That same day, the Winn Brook Elementary School was transformed into the Cambridge Police Department for second unit filming. The school was paid $5,000 to be in the film. Several private driveways on Statler and Waterhouse Roads were rented to park 1960s vehicles. For the next two days, filming took place in the South End; scenes were shot on Dwight Street between Tremont Street and Shawmut Avenue.

On December 9, the Benjamin Franklin Institute of Technology was temporarily turned into a police headquarters for the film. Between January 26 and 27, 2022, the former Josephine M. Foster Elementary School in Braintree was used as a set. Filming also took place in Jamaica Plain, Lowell, Lynn, Malden, Roxbury, and Wellesley, Massachusetts. Several health procedures had to be followed due to the COVID-19 pandemic. The entire crew was vaccinated and tested for the virus three times a week until production concluded. Filming wrapped in March 2022. During post-production, Paul Leonard-Morgan composed the musical score.

== Release ==
The film was released on March 17, 2023 by Hulu.

== Reception ==
=== Viewership ===
Nielsen Media Research, which records streaming viewership on US television screens, estimated that Boston Strangler was watched for 206 million minutes from March 13 to March 19, 2023. Whip Media, which tracks viewership data for the more than 21 million worldwide users of its TV Time app, calculated that Boston Strangler was the third most-streamed in the US during the week of March 19, 2023. The streaming aggregator Reelgood, which monitors real-time data from 5 million users in the US for original and acquired streaming programs and movies across subscription video-on-demand (SVOD) and ad-supported video-on-demand (AVOD) services, reported that Boston Strangler was the eighth most-streamed program during the week of March 23, 2023.

=== Critical response ===
On the review aggregator website Rotten Tomatoes, 66% of 139 critics' reviews are positive, with an average rating of 6.3/10. The website's consensus reads: "Boston Strangler is nowhere near as gripping as it should be, but the worthy story and strong cast are often adequate compensation." Metacritic, which uses a weighted average, assigned the film a score of 58 out of 100, based on 30 critics, indicating "mixed or average" reviews.

Kevin Slane writing for Boston.com praised Keira Knightley's performance, asserting: "Knightley is perfect in the role of McLaughlin, able to convey her dogged determination with a single steely glance." Nick Allen of RogerEbert.com gave Boston Strangler a grade of two and a half out of four stars, saying, "Boston Strangler reaches a point in which it is totally controlled by the wild course of events it is recreating, and it does make for decent, unsettling twists in a third act based on truth. But the emotional resonance is scant, even for how Boston Strangler casts another spotlight on game-changing Boston journalism. By the end, even Knightley only has so much space to construct a distinct arc from a dedication that lasted years and altered Loretta's personal life. Ruskin succeeds in paying tribute to Loretta McLaughlin and Jean Cole's hard work, but it's less successful in filling in the larger story."

Several reviewers made unfavorable comparisons to the earlier The Boston Strangler (1968) or David Fincher's Seven (1995) and Zodiac (2007). Peter Bradshaw of The Guardian gave the film a grade of two out of five stars, writing, "A director like Jonathan Demme or David Fincher would have gone for the jugular on this kind of material, but writer-director Matt Ruskin seems a little squeamish and keeps everything on the right side of contemporary taste. The chill of fear is missing." Jeannette Catsoulis of The New York Times stated: "Despite the film's flaccid gestures toward the sexism of the period—to boost sales, the women's pictures are added to their bylines—'Boston Strangler' is a dreary, painfully stylized slog."

=== Accolades ===
Boston Strangler was nominated for Outstanding Cinematography for a Limited or Anthology Series or Movie at the 75th Primetime Creative Arts Emmy Awards. It won Outstanding Achievement in Cinematography in Limited or Anthology Series, or Motion Picture Made for Television at the 2023 American Society of Cinematographers Awards.

== Historical accuracy ==
The story Boston Strangler presents is largely historically accurate, including the details of the crimes and investigation, the names of the victims, the sexism Loretta and Jean faced, and the fact that Loretta and Jean coined the name Boston Strangler. That said, authorities, authors and others still disagree about whether DeSalvo was the sole killer or whether the murders could have been the work of multiple individuals, as posited by the film.

Director Matt Ruskin interviewed the children of Loretta and Jean as well as their former colleagues to learn more about them and their work. In addition, Ruskin read all of Loretta and Jean's articles and "some of the headlines were pulled right from the paper. Keira has some voiceover in the film, where you hear what she's actually writing, and some of that was pulled directly from their stories, too".

Several historical inaccuracies stem from condensing the timeline. For example, in the film Loretta begins investigating after three murders, while in real life she did so after four. Sophie Clark is murdered on New Year's Eve in the film but in reality, she was discovered on December 5. In the film, the copycat murders in Michigan occur in 1965 but they actually occurred between 1967 and 1969. The film shows DeSalvo's death as occurring shortly after his conviction. In reality, the Boston Strangler's final murder was in 1964, DeSalvo was convicted in 1967, and he was killed in 1973.

Other major details changed for the film include:

- The character Detective Conley is a composite of multiple real detectives who worked on the case.
- The film shows Loretta and Jean meeting for the first time shortly before working together on the stories in 1962, in real life, they worked together as early as April 1952.
- In the film, DeSalvo calls Loretta and tells her to come to visiting hours the next day to hear his side of the story; he is killed by other prisoners that night. In real life, DeSalvo called psychiatrist Dr. Amos Robey just before his death.
- Daniel Marsh is actually a pseudonym given to a suspect in the case whose identity has never been made public; a suspect also referred to as David Parker by some media. In the film and in real life, he was a former Harvard student with a history of domestic abuse who moved to Michigan before copycat murders took place. In the film, the suspect's real name is given as Daniel Marsh, and it does not mention that another suspect was later convicted of one of the murders in the Michigan case.
- While the character of Paul Dempsey is fictional, some of the details about his life are based on suspected serial killer Charles E. Terry.
