= Charles Terry =

Charles Terry may refer to:

- Charles Edward Michael Terry (1897–1980), Hong Kong businessman
- Charles E. Terry (1930–1981), American convicted murderer and suspect in the "Boston Strangler" murders
- Charles C. Terry (1830–1867), Seattle businessman and pioneer
- Charles L. Terry Jr. (1900–1970), American lawyer and politician from Delaware
- Charles Sanford Terry (historian) (1864–1936), English historian and authority on Johann Sebastian Bach
- Charles Sanford Terry (translator) (1926–1982), American translator of Japanese literature

== See also ==
- Chuck Terry (born 1950), American basketball player
