= The Wild Ride =

1960 film starring Jack Nicholson

- Directed by: Harvey Berman
- Screenplay by: Ann Porter; Marion Rothman
- Story by: Burt Topper
- Produced by: Harvey Berman
- Starring: Jack Nicholson; Georgianna Carter; Robert Bean
- Cinematography: Taylor Sloan
- Edited by: Monte Hellman; William Mayer
- Distributed by: Filmgroup
- Release date: June 17, 1960
- Running time: 59 minutes 88 minutes (producer's cut)
- Country: United States
- Language: English

The Wild Ride is a 1960 American drama film directed by Harvey Berman and starring Jack Nicholson as a rebellious punk named Johnny, of the Beat Generation, who spends his days as an amateur dirt track driver in between partying and troublemaking. It was written by Ann Porter and Marion Rothman from a story by Burt Topper.

It was released by Filmgroup as a double feature with The Girl in Lovers Lane (1960).

The film has attracted attention retrospectively as an early starring vehicle for Jack Nicholson and, because it entered the public domain, has become widely available on home video and online.

== Plot ==
Johnny is the rebellious, troublemaking leader of a group of teenagers. In a high-speed pursuit by a motorcycle cop, he forces the cop to crash off the road. Rather than helping, he calls him "chicken" and rejoins his gang. The police take him in for questioning. He has a record for repeated speeding and reckless driving, but denies being involved.

The next day is the day of the big race, where Johnny will be driving. He goes to see his best friend Dave to get him to come to the pre-race party. Dave is unwilling because he is disturbed by the incident with the cop, and he is also seeing his new girlfriend, Nancy. Johnny thinks Nancy is stuck-up, and tells Dave she must fit in or she has got to go.

Johnny buys beer and whiskey for the party illegally, without ID. Nancy tells Dave she does not want to go to the party and she wants to be alone with him, but she gives in. On the way they encounter one of the gang, Barney, and they have a high-speed road race. Nancy is terrified, and Dave "chickens" as he approaches a truck head-on, and pulls off the road. At the party, when Johnny hears about Dave's behavior, he is unhappy, blames Nancy, and tells Dave "she's out". The others taunt Dave and there is a fight, which Johnny breaks up.

Nancy has had enough, and tells Dave it is over between them, which pleases Johnny. However, Dave still wants Nancy; he is also having doubts about the gang "tearing things up".

At the amateur dirt track race, Johnny gets money from his former girlfriend to bet on himself. Dave is at home and Nancy is at the track, worried where he is. During the race, Johnny drives very aggressively, forcing his remaining opponent off the track in order to win. His sponsor is unhappy with his driving and wants nothing more to do with him. Johnny is told the motorcycle cop is dead, but he is unmoved.

At a roadhouse, Barney is resentful of Johnny’s smug attitude and secretly phones Dave to tell him that Johnny is flirting with Nancy, and he had better hurry over. Johnny tells Nancy that she and Dave are over, but she disagrees. Johnny's former girlfriend turns up, a married woman with something important to tell him. He will not listen, there is an altercation and they are all told to leave.

Johnny decides to give Nancy a bad scare and drives off with her. Dave catches up and sees Johnny manhandling Nancy. Dave and Johnny have a big argument because Dave thinks Johnny is trying to take his girl. Johnny says "I did it for you!"

Dave drives off alone at high speed to get away from Johnny, who follows, with Nancy and the rest of the gang coming separately. Dave loses control of his car, crashes and is killed. Johnny says "I killed him, just like I killed that cop." The police arrive, and Johnny gives himself up without protest. Barney replaces Johnny as leader of the gang.

=== Re-cut version ===
In 1999, The Wild Ride was re-edited with new footage that makes the original film a long flashback sequence. Running 88 minutes and titled Velocity, the new scenes feature Jack Nicholson impersonator Joe Richards playing an older version of the character originally played by Nicholson, as well as performances by Jorge Garcia, Jason Sudeikis, and Dick Miller.

== Cast ==
- Jack Nicholson as Johnny Varron
- Georgianna Carter as Nancy
- Robert Bean as Dave
- Carol Bigby as Joyce
- John Bologni as Barny
- Gary Espinosa as Cliff
- Judith Trezise as Ann
- Wesley Tackitt
- Sydene Wallace
- Donna Dabney
- Garry Korpi
- Leonard Williams
- John Holden
- Raymond O'Day

== Production ==
The executive producer on the film was Roger Corman. Harvey Berman was a high-school drama teacher in northern California who had gone to the UCLA drama school with some friends of Corman. He decided to make a film during the summer in and around Concord, California using some of his high school drama class students in the cast and crew and sending a few Hollywood professionals to work with them. One of these was Jack Nicholson. Corman later wrote "this is one of the little pictures I remember with pleasure; it turned out very well."
