= Jean Cole =

American journalist (1926–2015)

Jean Harris
- Born: Jean Cole; May 13, 1926; Scituate, Massachusetts, U.S.
- Died: August 8, 2015 (aged 89); Housatonic, Massachusetts, U.S.
- Education: Boston University
- Occupation: Journalist
- Years active: 1945–1981
- Spouse: Frank P.Harris (died 2001)
- Children: 2

Jean Cole Harris (May 13, 1926 – August 8, 2015) was an American reporter and columnist. As a journalist at the Boston Record American, Harris, along with Loretta McLaughlin, covered the Boston Strangler murders in 1962. With McLaughlin, she was the first journalist to connect the murders and break the story about the serial killer.

== Early life and education ==
Born Jean Marie Cole in 1926 in Scituate, Massachusetts to Margaret Cole, a telephone switchboard operator, and Howard Cole, the first full-time firefighter and later firefighting chief of Scituate, Harris was the second of six children. In 1944, she graduated from Scituate High School and was accepted to the United States Army Nurse Corps at Quincy City Hospital.

== Career ==
Cole began her career working as a copy boy for the Boston American, in 1944. She was hired as an apprentice reporter by the Daily Record a few months later, earning her first byline in 1945.

In the early 1950s she carried out undercover work investigating nursing homes in the Boston area, publishing a series of stories about the conditions in these. For that work, the New England Woman's Press Association named Cole Woman of the Year in 1953 and Boston Newspapermen's Benevolent Association awarded her its Press Association Award in 1963.

Between 1962 and 1964, she was assigned, with Loretta McLaughlin, to investigate the case of a number of women who had been strangled around the Boston area. The two reporters were the first to make the link between these murders, based on their research. This received some derision from local police. It is believed that they were the ones to come up with the epithet of Boston Strangler, in a four-part series about the murders. After McLaughlin stopped working on the case, Cole continued her investigation and went on to publish the piece "Girls: Keep Doors Shut 'til DeSalvo Again in Custody", when Albert DeSalvo briefly evaded prison. Cole would also coin the term Combat Zone for a district of Boston with adult entertainment and a reputation for crime.

From 1972 until her retirement in 1981, Cole wrote for the Boston Herald American on the crime beat.

== Personal life ==
Harris met her husband Frank Harris, a reporter from the Boston Globe, in 1944, when he interviewed her father about a fire in her hometown. They were married in 1948 and had two daughters, Julie, born in 1950 and Jane, born in 1956.

=== Later life and death ===
In 1999, Cole moved to Anna Maria, Florida. She died in 2015 in Housatonic, Massachusetts, and is buried in Greenlawn Cemetery.

== In popular culture ==
In March 2023, Hulu released Boston Strangler, a film starring Keira Knightley as McLaughlin, and Carrie Coon as Cole, following the story of their work connecting the series of murders and breaking the story of the Boston Strangler.
