= Booster (film) =

- Directed by: Matt Ruskin
- Written by: Matt Ruskin
- Produced by: Andrea Roa; Matt Ruskin
- Starring: Nico Stone; Brian McGrail; Adam DuPaul; Kristin Dougherty; Seymour Cassel
- Cinematography: Tim Gillis
- Edited by: Matt Ruskin
- Music by: Alex Lasarenko
- Production company: Black Maple Films
- Distributed by: Emerald Peak Entertainment
- Release date: 12 March 2012 (South by Southwest)
- Running time: 73 minutes
- Country: United States
- Language: English

Booster is a 2012 American crime drama film directed by Matt Ruskin, starring Nico Stone, Brian McGrail, Adam DuPaul, Kristin Dougherty and Seymour Cassel.

== Cast ==
- Nico Stone as Simon
- Brian McGrail as Sean
- Adam DuPaul as Paul
- Kristin Dougherty as Megan
- Seymour Cassel as Harold
- Megan Hart as Kara

== Release ==
The film premiered South by Southwest on 12 March 2012.

== Reception ==
Joe Leydon of Variety called the film an "austere and stripped-to-essentials indie".

Ashley Moreno of The Austin Chronicle wrote that while the film "lacks concrete resolution", it "offers an honest glimpse into the lives of good people navigating bad situations", and the "Well-placed banter between the male characters and quiet familial moments nicely temper the film's overall serious tone."

Tom Keogh of The Video Librarian rated the film 2 stars out of 4 and wrote that the "promising story is unfortunately lost in a monotonous succession of dreary moments involving the lighting of cigarettes or watching Sean fence stolen goods, when he isn't busy looking at the floor in a state of emotional repression."
