= Loretta McLaughlin =

American journalist (1928–2018)

Loretta June McLaughlin
- Born: Loretta June McDermott; 1928; Woburn, Massachusetts, U.S.
- Died: November 23, 2018 (aged 90); Milton, Massachusetts, U.S.
- Education: Boston University (BA)
- Occupations: Journalist, author
- Spouses: James J. McLaughlin (divorced); James P. Becker (died 2002)
- Children: 3

Loretta McLaughlin (1928 – November 23, 2018) was an American journalist, author and newspaper editor. As a journalist at the Boston Record American, McLaughlin, along with Jean Cole, covered the Boston Strangler murders in 1962. She was the first journalist to connect the murders and break the story about the serial killer. In 1992, she was appointed as Editorial Page Editor for the Boston Globe, only the second woman to serve in this role.

== Early life and education ==
Born Loretta McDermott in 1928 in Woburn, Massachusetts, to Anna (née Ring) McDermott, a homemaker, and John McDermott, who worked for a Quincy, Massachusetts shipyard. Her siblings included: John, Sylvester ("DeeDee"), and Margaret. McLaughlin's family moved to South Boston when she was a child, and she graduated from South Boston High School. McLaughlin attended Boston University on an academic scholarship, where she studied journalism. She graduated with a B.A. in 1949.

== Career ==
McLaughlin worked as a journalist for the Boston Record American during the 1950s. During that time, she and Jean (née Cole) Harris (1926–2015) investigated and publicized the 1962 Boston Strangler assaults and murders. McLaughlin later went on to work as a science writer for Harvard University, and as executive director of public relations at Massachusetts Eye and Ear Infirmary, Boston, where she led a capital campaign to build its primary facility.

In the 1970s, McLaughlin returned to journalism and joined the Herald American (a subsequent publication of the Boston Record American she previously reported for) as a medical reporter. In 1976, the Boston Globe recruited McLaughlin as a medical news specialist. As a strong advocate for public health, McLaughlin devoted much of her work to covering the AIDS crisis. After she joined the Editorial Page staff in 1992, McLaughlin was critical of elected officials, such as US Senator Jesse Helms, for politicizing the disease, writing in the Globe in 1995:

Helms is invincibly ignorant about AIDS, a complicated matter that is not suited to moralistic pandering... he can't even tell the difference between his blind prejudice and a slow but world-encompassing plague.

She also wrote the Boston Globe's endorsements of William Weld for Governor of Massachusetts, Bill Clinton for President of the United States, and Thomas Menino for Mayor of Boston.

In 1982 McLaughlin published her book The Pill, John Rock, and the Church: The Biography of a Revolution, about the development of the birth control pill. The work was praised in JAMA as "an expression of the synthesis of science and humanism at its best", but panned by reviewer Barbara Ehrenreich in The New York Times as being almost wholly uncritical of the dubious ethics of many of the research studies that led to the development of the drug. The Loretta McLaughlin research and publication records collection is held at the Francis A. Countway Library of Medicine at Harvard University.

In 1988, The New England Journal of Public Policy published McLaughlin's article "AIDS: An Overview", which was strongly critical of the federal government's response to the epidemic.

In July 1992, McLaughlin became the second woman in the Globe's history to become editor of the Editorial Page. In this role, she spoke at the 1993 New England Health Care Summit. She held this position until December 1993, when she reached the Globe's then-mandatory retirement age of 65.

After retiring from the Boston Globe, McLaughlin was a fellow at the Radcliffe College Institute for Public Policy and was a Senior Fellow at the Harvard AIDS Institute.

== In popular culture ==
- McLaughlin portrayed herself in the 2000 documentary Lawbreakers: Who Was the Real Boston Strangler? and the 2010 episode, "Albert DeSalvo: The Boston Strangler", of the series Born to Kill?.
- In March 2023, Hulu released Boston Strangler, a film starring Keira Knightley as McLaughlin, and Carrie Coon as Jean Cole, following the story of their work connecting the series of murders and breaking the story of the Boston Strangler.
