= Stranglers (podcast) =

True crime podcast

- Genre: True crime
- Language: American English

Cast and voices
- Hosted by: Portland Helmich

Production
- Length: 30-60 Minutes

Publication
- No. of seasons: 1
- No. of episodes: 12
- Original release: November 16, 2016
- Provider: Stitcher and Northern Light Productions

Related
- Related shows: Lore; My Favorite Murder; Criminal; Serial

Stranglers is a true crime podcast hosted by Portland Helmich and provided by Northern Light Productions. It covers the crimes of the murderer known as the Boston Strangler.

== Reception ==
The podcast was included on The Atlantic's list of "The 50 Best Podcasts of 2016".
