= George Nassar =

American murderer (1932–2018)

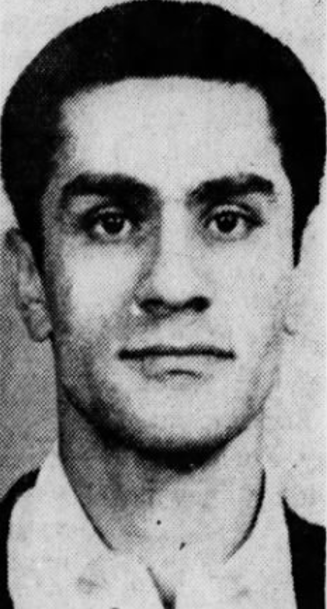
- Mugshot of Nassar taken by Andover police in 1964
- Born: June 7, 1932; Providence, Rhode Island, U.S.
- Died: December 3, 2018 (aged 86); Lemuel Shattuck Hospital Correctional Unit, Boston, Massachusetts, U.S.
- Status: Deceased
- Convictions: First degree murder Second degree murder
- Penalty: Life imprisonment (1948; paroled 1961); Death (1965; sentence struck down to life imprisonment)

Details
- Victims: 2
- Country: United States
- State: Massachusetts

George Henry Nassar (June 7, 1932 – December 3, 2018) was an American murderer, known for his claim that Albert DeSalvo allegedly confessed to being the Boston Strangler to him in late 1965, while both were cellmates at a prison psychiatric ward. Nassar contacted his lawyer F. Lee Bailey and informed him of this confession, which led to DeSalvo becoming the prime suspect in the unsolved Strangler murders.

== Early life ==
Nassar was born in Providence, Rhode Island, in 1932, the oldest of two children of Helen (née George; also known as Essie Farrah) and Henry Nassar, both of Assyrian descent. Henry had come to America with his parents as a child from Syria and worked as a tailor at various mills in Lawrence, Massachusetts. He abandoned the family during his son's childhood, dying in 1955. Helen was born in Dover, New Hampshire, and worked as a bobbin setter in mills. George and his sister Eileen grew up in Lawrence and were Catholics. George was involved in sports, and was a Boy Scout. At school, his teachers found him "reserved, quiet, and a poor mixer".

== Murder of Dominic Kirmil ==
On the evening of April 15, 1948, then aged 15, Nassar and two friends, 16-year-olds Gennaro Pullino and William Kenney, committed a series of robberies in their hometown of Lawrence. They stole $80 (equivalent to $1,072 in 2025) from three local businesses, but failed to rob fourth, a convenience store, when owner Victoria Borisek drove the robbers out with a broom after being threatened at gunpoint. The fifth and final business the trio robbed was a variety store on 99 Park Street, run by 59-year-old Lithuanian-born shop owner Dominic Kirmil. After the robbers distracted the owner by ordering soda, Nassar pulled out a revolver from his trench coat and told Kirmil. "Throw the cokes out; this is a stick-up". In response, Kirmil threw the bottle of Coca-Cola he held in his hand at the face of one of the assailants, with Nassar retaliating by shooting Kirmil four times in the chest, arm, and hand. Nassar and his accomplices fled the store, after which Kirmil was found by two children passing by the scene. Kirmil was taken to Lawrence General Hospital, where he gave detailed descriptions of his assailants to police, although mistakenly describing the robbers as aged 18–20, before he died three hours later from the loss of blood. The previous victim Victoria Borisek as well as several witnesses to Kirmil's murder described Nassar's distinct dark-colored trench coat to the police.

On May 20, Nassar was picked up by Lawrence patrolmen Charles Keenan and Walter Sliva after crashing a stolen car on Route 110 in Ayer, Massachusetts. Initially charged with auto theft, Nassar soon became a prominent suspect in the Kirmil murder. The police found two .38 caliber bullets in his pocket, and the nickel-plated revolver used in the murder in the wrecked car. Nassar confessed to the shooting and gave his motive as "for excitement". Nassar and his friends Pullino and Kenney were indicted and initially charged with first degree murder, which carried a mandatory death sentence under Massachusetts law at the time. However, on account of the youth of the defendants, the charge was downgraded to a second degree murder, to which they pled guilty. On January 17, 1949, all three were formally sentenced to life in prison.

=== Imprisonment and release ===
Nassar was sent to the prison Massachusetts Correctional Institution – Norfolk in Dedham, Massachusetts. During his incarceration, Nassar gained an interest in studying the Russian language and formed a friendship with Unitarian minister William Moors and joined the Prison's Debating Society. Through the efforts of Moors, Nassar was paroled early in 1961, with Nassar claiming that he sought to attend Northeastern University to major in Russian. His parole was criticized by several Massachusetts political figures. Middlesex and Suffolk district state senator Francis X. McCann made a statement demanding the parole board disclose the reasons for Nassar's release while Massachusetts state representative Perlie Dyar Chase opined that the Massachusetts State Crime Commission should re-examine all paroles and pardons handed out by the state in the last decade. Author Susan Kelly compared the political interest around Nassar to the use of Willie Horton by the campaign of George H. W. Bush during the 1988 presidential election. Accomplices Gennaro Pullino and William Kenney were granted parole the same year.

According to Ames Robey, medical director of Bridgewater State Hospital, Nassar became involved in the Irish Gang War in Charlestown, Boston, and was connected to at least 17 murders and possibly a total of 30. Robey would later also voice strong suspicions that Nassar could have committed the Boston Strangler killings, as he was released a year before the murders began.

== Murder of Irvin Hilton ==
On September 29, 1964, Nassar murdered 44-year-old Texaco station owner Irvin Hilton in Andover, in full view of Rita Buote and her 14-year-old daughter Diane. As Buote pulled into the station, Nassar fired one shot into the kneeling Hilton, and three more after he crumpled to the floor. He then approached Buote's car and aimed his gun at her, firing twice before realizing it was out of bullets. After unsuccessfully trying to pull open the locked car door, he left the scene and entered another car, driving off toward North Andover. A truck driver, William King, and his passenger Reginald Mortimer wrote down the plate number, noting its Virginia registration, and called the police. King and Mortimer described the suspect as "a slim, dark-haired man of medium height, wearing a light tan trench coat or top coat".

The getaway car was found later that evening on a street near Phillips Academy. The police soon learned that the car had been stolen earlier that day from near the Massachusetts Institute of Technology in Cambridge. The car belonged to a navy lieutenant who was attending MIT. A .32 caliber nickel-plated Harrington & Richardson revolver and a .22 caliber Astra semi-automatic pistol were found underneath the front seat of the car. Shells from the revolver were found at the crime scene and matched the bullets found in Hilton.

An autopsy on Hilton revealed that he had been shot six times at close range with .22 caliber ammunition and also stabbed in the back. The police theorized that the murderer had made Hilton beg for his life while shooting him.

A description given by Rita and Diane Buote enabled Andover police officer William Tammany to draw a composite of the killer. On spotting the drawing, Nassar's former arresting officer Charles Keenan was struck by its familiarity. He went through his files and came up with a photograph of Nassar, which the Buotes positively identified as the man they saw shooting Hilton.

Nassar was found living in the Mattapan section of Boston. The Andover, Lawrence, and state police contacted the Boston police department, and got a warrant at Dorchester District Court to search the suspect's car and his apartment on 51 Deering Road. When the police arrived on October 1, they found Nassar with a Medfield State Hospital social worker. A hunting knife was also located and confiscated. Keenan was one of the arresting officers and was eventually recognized by Nassar. Diane Buote identified Nassar as the man who killed Irvin Hilton.

Nassar was subsequently arrested and sent to Bridgewater to await his trial. Psychological examiners assessed him as of above-average intelligence and diagnosed him as a "paranoid schizophrenic with an extremely severe sociopathic personality disorder", and he was put under observation, during which time he met DeSalvo. Nassar's first attorney, Paul Smith, was switched out for F. Lee Bailey. Five supporters of Nassar, who believed in his innocence in the Hilton murder, raised $7,000 to cover some of his legal fees. They included two prominent locals: progressive WBZ radio host Paul Benzaquin and the minister of the Greater Lawrence Men’s Brotherhood of Temple Emmanuel, who was a colleague of Nassar's prison chaplain William Moors.

On June 26, 1965, a jury found Nassar guilty of Hilton's murder, with no recommendation for mercy, meaning he would receive the death penalty. Nassar delivered a statement following the verdict, in which he continued to plead his innocence and specifically addressed witness Diane Buote, saying "I know what it's like to be young and surrounded in a courtroom, where the innocent are guilty". He was placed on death row at Walpole State Prison pending appeal. On June 7, 1966, his sentence was struck down by the Massachusetts Supreme Judicial Court upon appeal, and later changed to life imprisonment.

== Later life ==
Nassar was convicted in 1967 of murder in the first degree and that conviction was upheld following plenary or de novo review. In 1969, he lost an appeal against the conviction. In 1982, Nassar filed an unsuccessful pro se motion for a new trial. When that motion was denied Nassar filed a one-sentence "motion for leave to appeal", which was effectively abandoned.

Nassar and other Massachusetts prisoners were transferred to federal custody in the summer of 1980. Nassar and seven other prisoners successfully challenged the transfers in a 1981 civil suit. Because the prisoners did not receive reclassification hearings and other procedures mandated by Massachusetts law, they were returned to Massachusetts custody.

Nassar was being held in federal prison in Leavenworth, Kansas, as late as 1983. He was later transferred to Massachusetts Correctional Institution – Shirley.

After twenty years, Nassar filed a motion for a new trial, which was denied. The Supreme Judicial Court of Massachusetts, in affirming the denial of the motion, wrote: “Nassar claimed in his motion that he was unable, in 1983, to show good cause not to dismiss the matter because at that time, he was incarcerated in the Federal prison in Leavenworth, Kansas, without access to Massachusetts legal materials. However, he was returned to Massachusetts in December 1983, but did not seek to reopen the matter or inquire as to its status at that time, or at any time thereafter for over twenty years. We perceive no error or abuse of discretion in declining to reopen the proceedings after such a long period of inaction.”

Nassar's appeal was denied by the Massachusetts Supreme Judicial Court on February 15, 2008. He maintained his innocence for Hilton's murder for the rest of his life.

In a television interview broadcast on October 26, 2018, Nassar said he was terminally ill with cancer. No additional announcements were made about his condition in the years that immediately followed. The film Boston Strangler, released in 2023, describes him as "still in prison" in its epilogue. After viewing the film, journalist Sarah Weinman contacted the Massachusetts Department of Correction for updates, finding it unlikely he would live so long after a terminal diagnosis. Prison officials told her that Nassar was dead but did not initially provide further information. The New York Times subsequently reported that he died from prostate cancer at the Lemuel Shattuck Hospital Correctional Unit in Boston on December 3, 2018, at the age of 86, just over a month after the interview aired.
