= Charles E. Terry =

American murderer (1930–1981)

Charles Terry
- Born: Charles Edward Terry; May 26, 1930; Waterville, Maine, U.S.
- Died: April 15, 1981 (aged 50); Attica Correctional Facility, Attica, New York, U.S.
- Convictions: First degree murder Rape; Assault and battery Theft
- Penalty: Death; commuted to life imprisonment

Details
- Victims: 1–4+
- Span of crimes: 1951–1963
- Country: United States
- States: New York, Maine, Massachusetts and Louisiana
- Date apprehended: June 6, 1963

Charles Edward Terry (May 26, 1930 – April 15, 1981) was an American murderer and suspected serial killer convicted of the 1963 strangling of Zenovia Clegg, and a suspect in two murders in his native Maine. It is also suggested that Terry could have perpetrated even more killings in Massachusetts (including several attributed to the Boston Strangler) and Louisiana. He died in prison in 1981, from pulmonary embolism, after suffering from lung cancer.

== Early life ==
Charles was born on May 26, 1930, to parents Frank Terry and Oakland-born Susie Terry (née Pelkie). He also had an older sister, Frances. The Terry family managed a store selling hand-braided rugs on Pleasant Street, while Frank worked at the Kennebec Canoe Company, owned by his brother George. Little Charlie was regarded as a normal boy with a loving attitude towards his parents, but at the age of 4, he hit his head on a rock and nearly drowned in the Messalonskee Lake. He was found unconscious and floating face-down in the water, and was speedily resuscitated. According to his parents, this incident would later permanently change him.

In 1935, Terry enrolled into the North Grammar School, moving for a short time to Brookside Elementary before returning to North Grammar. On December 19, 1941, the family moved to Winslow, where Charles attended Winslow High School until the 10th grade, when he quit. At school, the youngster was often described as a misfit and a loner by his classmates, never getting along with teachers and infamous for stealing, especially from the boys' locker room.

In one instance, he was caught stealing from the workshop of the McQuillan family by the two boys, John and Robert. Being much bigger than them, he picked up a rock and threw it at the brothers, hitting John on the back of the head, leaving a permanent scar. In an act of revenge, the McQuillans strung wires between two trees and awaited for Terry's return. When they saw him snooping around again, they lured Charles into chasing them, resulting in his neck hitting the wire and Terry falling on his back. After this, he stopped visiting the workshop.

On another occasion, the 15-year-old Terry stole a brand-new bike from a boy named Billy. However, Billy teamed up with Lee Hapworth, who lived near Terry in Winslow, and they managed to steal a canvas boat owned by the latter. When Charles' father came to them, they demanded that his son return the bike, and a short while later, the bike turned up at the Hapworths' farm.

== Early crimes ==
Standing tall at 6 feet, 5 inches (1, 95 meters) and very slim, the 17-year-old soon joined the Marine Corps, serving from 1947 to 1949. He was dishonorably discharged after he was arrested and convicted of stealing a vehicle while absent on leave. While incarcerated, Terry alleged that he was raped by other inmates.

Three months after his release, in April 1951, the now-21-year-old assaulted two women on the same evening in Kennebec County, raping one of them. He pleaded guilty to rape and was sentenced to eight years in prison. The attempted rape charge was dropped. Terry was unpopular with fellow inmates, as he constantly destroyed property, drew obscene pictures and was a public disturbance. Terry was released in 1958, and on November 1 of that year, he married Theresa Lessard LaRochelle, from North Vassalboro, a divorcée with two children. The following year, Charles was arrested for assaulting a Maine woman in her 50s, breaking her jaw in two places and cutting her scalp. He pleaded guilty to assault and battery and sentenced to 1.5 to 3 years in prison. While serving his sentence at the Maine State Prison, he was diagnosed as an intelligent psychopath with a sexual sadism disorder.

Although Theresa divorced Terry in 1961, after his release, the two became acquainted again, resulting in a son named Mark Shawn LaRochelle being born on July 26, 1962. Charles denied the claim of being the child's father. Over the following years, he had several jobs, including working as a truck driver, painter and laborer, but struggled to keep them. In 1962, he was fired from two jobs he held in his native Waterville: from the-then Crescent Hotel for not following orders, and from the Wyandotte Worsted Co. for having a criminal record. During this period, Terry was noted for having lived in several locations: New Orleans, New York, Waterville and Boston.

== Murders ==
=== Shirley Coolen ===
On May 26, 1951, 24-year-old Shirley Coolen was found strangled with her own scarf in a flower garden in Brunswick. Charles Terry was suspected in her killing, but was never charged.

=== Patricia Wing ===
On June 3, 1958, 29-year-old Oakland native Patricia Wing was killed in a remote wooded area in Fairfield, allegedly after being picked up by a man with whom she was having an affair. Wing's lover, Augusta business executive Everett Savage Jr., was charged with her murder, but was only convicted of assault and served his time in prison for it. However, it is believed that Terry had actually killed Wing.

=== Donna Kimmey ===
On December 17, 1962, stewardess Donna Kimmey was strangled in Kenner, Louisiana. Terry would later tell New York investigators that he had been in New Orleans in December 1962.

=== Zenovia Clegg ===
According to his confession, on May 30, 1963, Terry and the 62-year-old Zenovia Clegg, a victim of cancer who wore scarves to cover the surgical scars on her neck, had arranged to have sex at a hotel in Times Square. However, Clegg humiliated Terry because of his impotence. The enraged man then began beating Clegg, strangling her with her scarf while on the bed, tying it into a bow afterwards. After that, he sexually assaulted her naked body with a liquor bottle, posing it in a sexual manner, before leaving the premises. A few days later, a maid discovered the body, as well as a pear placed next to the victim's right leg.

== Arrest, sentence and death ==
Seven days after the discovery of Clegg's body, a team of detectives led by Thomas J. Cavanagh Jr. managed to track down Terry in a Greenwich Village bar. He was quickly arrested, and under interrogation by Cavanagh, Terry quickly confessed to the killing, describing it in graphic detail. For this, he was quickly charged with murder, convicted and sentenced to die in the electric chair. However, taking into account his mental state, a judge later commuted his sentence to life imprisonment. On April 15, 1981, Terry, who was suffering from lung cancer, died in prison from pulmonary embolism.

== Connection to the Boston Strangler ==
While examining the Clegg crime scene, Det. Cavanagh noted that it shockingly resembled the recent murders in Boston. Not only that, but during an interrogation, Terry himself confessed to visiting Boston on the weekends, coinciding with the times that five of the Strangler's victims had been killed. However, the Boston police, fearing scrutiny from the media, weren't interested in Cavanagh's findings. Also, he wasn't allowed to continue his interrogation until Terry's confession for the New York killing was taped. Boston police were informed, and within hours, the then-Chief of Homicide Unit John Donovan arrived in New York City, with the intention of questioning Terry. However, the latter refused to talk to the former.

With the help of other retired detectives, nicknamed the "Over the Hill Gang", Cavanagh continued to investigate the Boston killings, with the hope of somehow connecting Terry to at least some of them. During the process, he employed the help of his son Brian, now a prosecutor in Broward County, Florida. Two of the detectives, James Macken and James Le Curlo, travelled to Boston, and managed to discover that Terry had stayed at two rooming houses only blocks away from some of the stranglings. However, the Boston police chased them out of town before they could continue.

John Spencer, a Fort Lauderdale psychiatrist and expert in sex-related crimes and killings, agreed with the theory, noting that there was no way that Clegg was Terry's first murder:

"If it's your first killing, you're so pumped up on adrenaline and scared that you're not going to stick around and do anything, much less decorate the body."

In 2014 Confessions of the Boston Strangler, a documentary from Northern Light Productions, investigated Charles E. Terry's life.

The 2023 film Boston Strangler featured a character named Paul Dempsey that was inspired by Terry.

== See also ==
- List of serial killers in the United States

== Bibliography ==
- Emeric Spooner (January 17, 2011). The Boston Strangler From Maine. CreateSpace Independent Publishing Platform. ISBN 978-1456345518.
