= A Rose for Mary =

2003 book by Casey Sherman

- Author: Casey Sherman
- Publisher: Northeastern University Press
- Publication date: 2003
- ISBN: 9781555535780

A Rose for Mary: The Hunt for the Real Boston Strangler is a 2003 book about Mary Sullivan, the last victim of confessed Boston Strangler Albert DeSalvo. Written by Sullivan's nephew, Casey Sherman, the book presents DNA evidence that suggests DeSalvo was not the Boston Strangler.

On July 11, 2013, Boston Police Department released information stating that they had discovered DNA evidence linking DeSalvo to the murder of Mary Sullivan. DNA found at the scene was a "near certain match" to DNA taken from a nephew of DeSalvo. To determine conclusively that it was DeSalvo's, a court ordered the exhumation of his body in order to test his DNA directly. On July 19, 2013 Suffolk County DA Daniel F. Conley, Mass. Attorney General Martha Coakley and Boston Police Commissioner Edward F. Davis announced the DNA test results proving Albert Henry DeSalvo was the source of seminal fluid recovered at the scene of Sullivan's 1964 murder.
