= Marion Rothman =

American film editor (1928–2023)

- Born: 3 July 1928; Detroit, Michigan
- Died: 17 May 2023 (aged 94)
- Occupation: Film editor

Marion Rothman was an American film editor active from the 1960s through the 1990s. She is best known for her work on two 1970s Planet of the Apes movies, as well as Mystic Pizza and Christine. She also had a screenwriting credit on the 1960 film The Wild Ride. Her first known assignment was assisting with the cutting of 1959's The Diary of Anne Frank. She served as a mentor for editor Virginia Katz in Los Angeles.

Rothman died on 17 May 2023, at the age of 94.

== Selected filmography ==
Editor
| Year | Film | Director | Notes | Ref. |
|---|---|---|---|---|
| 1968 | The Boston Strangler | Richard Fleischer | First collaboration with Richard Fleischer | |
| 1969 | Che! | Richard Fleischer | Second collaboration with Richard Fleischer | |
| 1970 | Beneath the Planet of the Apes | Ted Post | | |
| 1971 | Billy Jack | Tom Laughlin | | |
| 1971 | Escape from the Planet of the Apes | Don Taylor | First collaboration with Don Taylor | |
| 1972 | Play It Again, Sam | Herbert Ross | First collaboration with Herbert Ross | |
| 1973 | Tom Sawyer | Don Taylor | Second collaboration with Don Taylor | |
| 1973 | Ash Wednesday | Larry Peerce | | |
| 1975 | Funny Lady | Herbert Ross | Second collaboration with Herbert Ross | |
| 1976 | Lipstick | Lamont Johnson | | |
| 1976 | Baby Blue Marine | John D. Hancock | | |
| 1977 | The Island of Dr. Moreau | Don Taylor | Third collaboration with Don Taylor | |
| 1977 | Orca | Michael Anderson | | |
| 1978 | Comes a Horseman | Alan J. Pakula | First collaboration with Alan J. Pakula | |
| 1979 | Starting Over | Alan J. Pakula | Second collaboration with Alan J. Pakula | |
| 1981 | All Night Long | Jean-Claude Tramont | | |
| 1983 | Christine | John Carpenter | First collaboration with John Carpenter | |
| 1984 | Starman | John Carpenter | Second collaboration with John Carpenter | |
| 1986 | Club Paradise | Harold Ramis | | |
| 1988 | Mystic Pizza | Donald Petrie | First collaboration with Donald Petrie | |
| 1990 | Opportunity Knocks | Donald Petrie | Second collaboration with Donald Petrie | |
| 1992 | Memoirs of an Invisible Man | John Carpenter | Third collaboration with John Carpenter | |

Editorial department
| Year | Film | Director | Role | Notes |
|---|---|---|---|---|
| 1959 | The Diary of Anne Frank | George Stevens | Assistant film editor | Uncredited |

Writer
| Year | Film | Director |
|---|---|---|
| 1960 | The Wild Ride | Harvey Berman |

TV movies

Editor
| Year | Film | Director |
|---|---|---|
| 1975 | My Father's House | Alex Segal |

Writer
| Year | Film | Director |
|---|---|---|
| 1999 | Velocity | David Wolfe; David Blass |
