= Brontë (play) =

Brontë was a 2005 play by British playwright Polly Teale, about the lives of the Brontë sisters, their brother Branwell, and their father Patrick. It also featured characters from the sisters' novels such as Cathy and Heathcliff from Wuthering Heights (1847).

The play was first staged in 2005 at the West Yorkshire Playhouse, and again in 2011. In 2010, there was a production of Brontë at the Watermill Theatre in Newbury, which was directed by Nancy Meckler. In 2015-2016 there was a production of Brontë by the Promethean Theatre Ensemble in Chicago, directed by Jaclynn Jutting.
