= Albert DeSalvo =

American rapist and suspected serial killer (1931–1973)

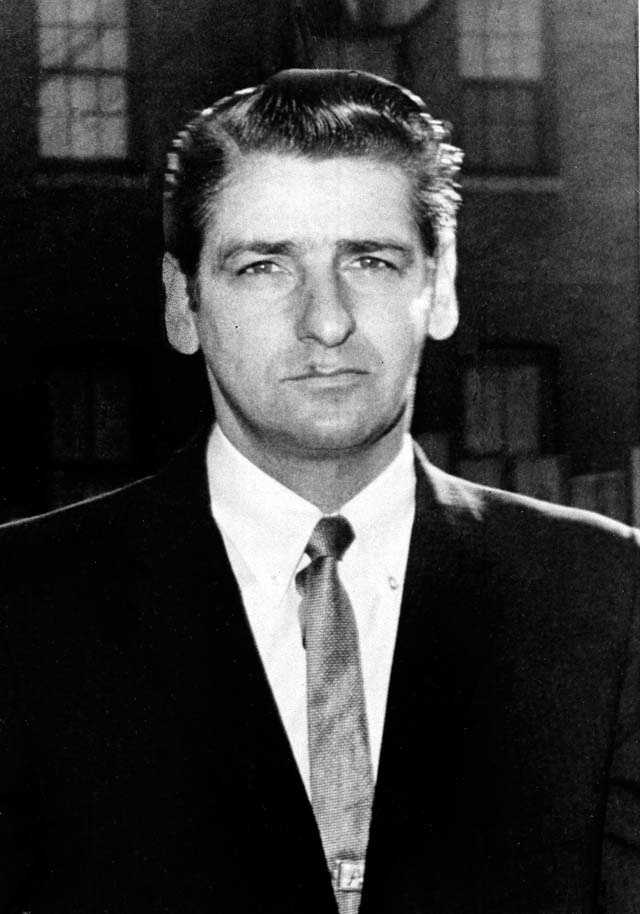
- DeSalvo after escaping Bridgewater State Hospital and subsequent capture in Lynn, Massachusetts, in 1967
- Born: September 3, 1931; Chelsea, Massachusetts, U.S.
- Died: November 25, 1973 (aged 42); Walpole, Massachusetts, U.S.
- Other names: The Boston Strangler; Mad Strangler of Boston; The Measuring Man; The Green Man
- Convictions: Battery; Robbery; Auto theft Rape
- Penalty: Life imprisonment

Details
- Victims: 1–13+
- Span of crimes: June 14, 1962 – January 4, 1964
- Country: United States
- State: Massachusetts
- Date apprehended: October 27, 1964

Albert Henry DeSalvo (September 3, 1931 – November 25, 1973), also known as the Green Man or the Measuring Man, was an American murderer and rapist who was active in Boston, Massachusetts, in the early 1960s. He is known for having confessed to being the "Boston Strangler," a serial killer who murdered thirteen women in the Boston area between 1962 and 1964. DeSalvo's murder confessions were deemed credible, yet due to limited evidence in those cases he was not charged. He was prosecuted in 1967 for a series of unrelated rapes. He was found guilty, convicted and imprisoned for life. He died in prison after being stabbed in 1973. DeSalvo's claims to have murdered multiple women were disputed, and debates continued regarding which crimes he truly committed.

By the early 21st century, techniques for DNA capture and analysis could allow for the re-investigation of some DeSalvo-Strangler cases. In July 2013, an analysis of semen found around the body of Mary Sullivan, the last of the Strangler's victims, was compared to DNA obtained from DeSalvo's nephew. Results showed a familial match and investigators believed this finding linked DeSalvo to the killing of Sullivan. The DNA match excluded 99.9% of the remaining population. Later that month, authorities exhumed DeSalvo's body and found that his DNA was a match.

== Early life ==
Albert DeSalvo was born on September 3, 1931, in Chelsea, Massachusetts, as the third of six children to Charlotte (née Roberts) and Frank DeSalvo. DeSalvo's father was a violent alcoholic who abused his wife and children; in one of the many times he attacked his wife in front of the children, he knocked out all her teeth and bent her fingers back until they broke. DeSalvo's father would also bring home prostitutes and engage in sexual acts with them in front of family members, including the children.

The young DeSalvo began torturing animals as a child. In early adolescence, he engaged in acts of petty theft and shoplifting, frequently crossing paths with the law. In 1943, DeSalvo, then aged 12, was arrested for battery and robbery and was subsequently sent to the Lyman School for Boys. In October 1944, DeSalvo was paroled and started working as a delivery boy. In August 1946, nearly fifteen years old, he was returned to the Lyman School after being convicted of auto theft.

After completing his second sentence, DeSalvo joined the United States Army. He served as a Military Police sergeant with the 2nd Squadron, 14th Armored Cavalry Regiment and became the middleweight boxing champion among his fellow troops in Europe. During his first tour of duty in West Germany, he married a German national named Irmgard Beck and returned to the United States with her following his honorable discharge. The couple had two children, a girl and a boy, the former of whom had a physical disability. DeSalvo eventually re-enlisted in the army and, despite being court martialed for the sexual assault of a nine-year-old girl, was again honorably discharged.

At the time of the Boston Strangler murders, DeSalvo lived with his family at 11 Florence Street Park in Malden, Massachusetts, across the street from the junction of Florence and Clement streets.

== Murders ==
Between 1962 and 1964, thirteen single women between the ages of 19 and 85 were murdered in the Boston area; their deaths were eventually tied to a serial killer dubbed the Boston Strangler. Most of the victims were sexually assaulted in their apartments before being strangled with articles of clothing. The oldest victim died of a heart attack. Two others were stabbed to death, one of whom was also badly beaten. Without signs of forced entry into their dwellings, the victims were assumed to have either known their killer or voluntarily allowed him into their homes.

The final victim of the murders was 19-year-old Mary Sullivan, who was raped and strangled in her Boston apartment on January 4, 1964. Three ligatures were wrapped around her neck, and a broom handle was lodged in her vagina. A card reading "Happy New Year" was left by the killer, leaning against her left foot.

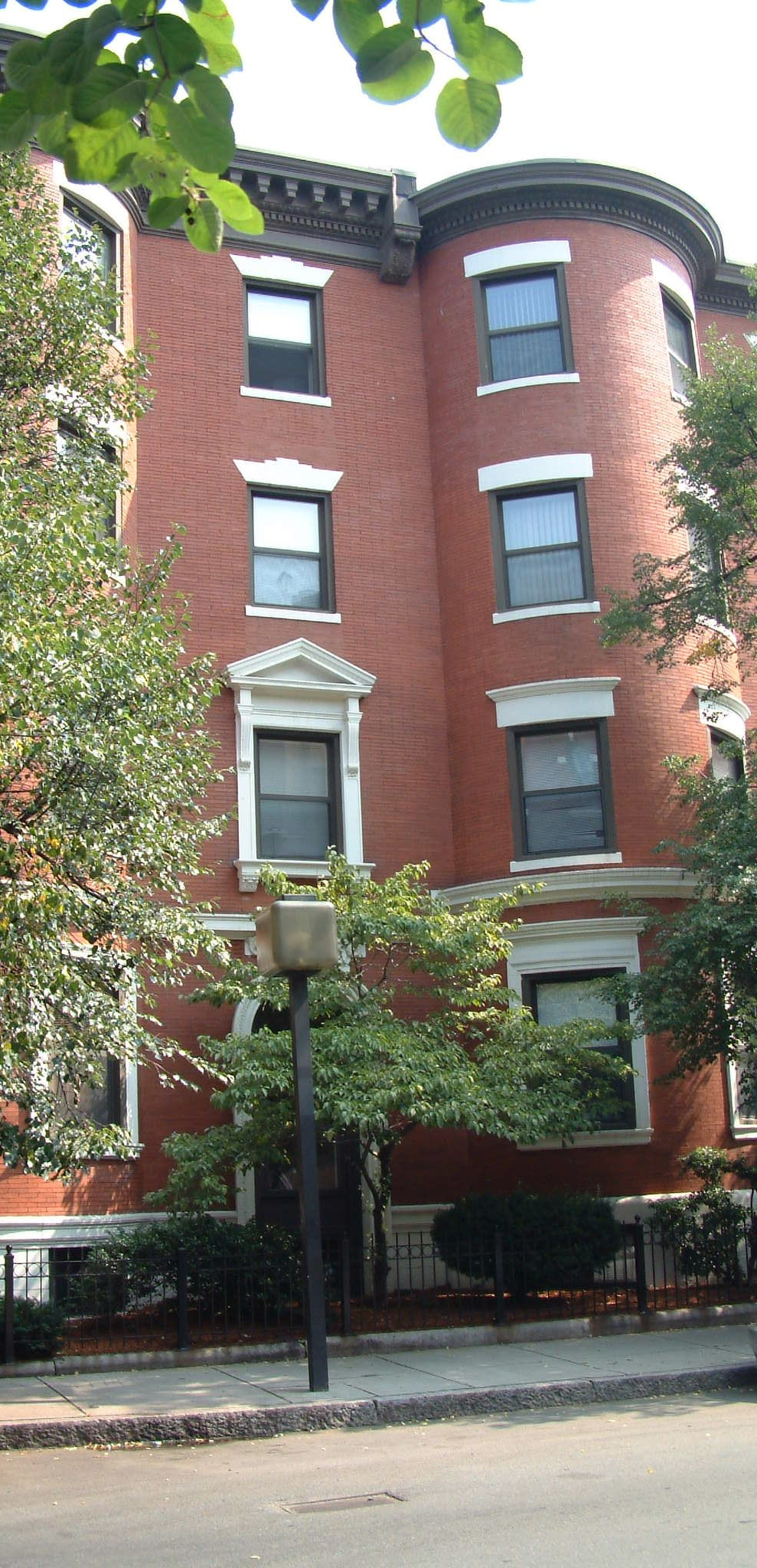
Gainsborough Street, site of the first of the Boston Strangler's murders

In late 1964, in addition to the Strangler murders, the Boston Police Department (BPD) were trying to solve a series of rapes committed by a man who had been dubbed the "Green Man" or the "Measuring Man". On October 27, a stranger entered a young woman's home in East Cambridge posing as a detective. He tied his victim to her bed, sexually assaulted her and left after undoing her restraints, apologizing as he departed. The woman's description led police to identify the assailant as DeSalvo.

When his photo was published, many women identified DeSalvo as the man who had assaulted them in the "Green Man" attacks. Earlier on October 27, DeSalvo had posed as a motorist with car trouble and attempted to enter a home in Bridgewater. The owner of the home, Richard Sproules (a future police chief of Brockton), became suspicious. He ultimately fired a shotgun at DeSalvo, who fled the scene.

Under arrest for his role in the "Green Man" rapes, DeSalvo was initially not suspected of being involved with the Strangler murders. He had confessed to fellow inmate George Nassar, who notified his attorney, F. Lee Bailey. Bailey subsequently took over DeSalvo's defense. Though there were some inconsistencies in his account, DeSalvo cited details of the Strangler case that had not been made public. However, police did not find physical evidence to substantiate his confession. Only after DeSalvo was charged with rape did he give a detailed confession of his activities as the Strangler. This took place on two occasions: under hypnosis induced by William Joseph Bryan, and without hypnosis during interviews with Assistant Attorney General John Bottomly.

For his 1967 trial, DeSalvo was evaluated by Harry Kozol, a neurologist who had established the first sex offender treatment center in Massachusetts. Bailey arranged a plea bargain to lock in DeSalvo's guilt in exchange for excluding the death penalty as punishment. He also wanted to preserve the possibility of an eventual insanity plea.

Bailey was angered by the jury's decision to sentence DeSalvo to life imprisonment without parole. He said:

My goal was to see the Strangler wind up in a hospital, where doctors could try to find out what made him kill. Society is deprived of a study that might help deter other mass killers who lived among us, waiting for the trigger to go off inside them.

=== Victims ===
| Name | Age | Discovery date | Finding place |
|---|---|---|---|
| Anna Elza Slesers | 55 | June 14, 1962 | 77 Gainsborough Street, Boston |
| Mary Mullen | 85 | June 28, 1962 | 1435 Commonwealth Avenue, Boston |
| Nina Nioma Nichols | 68 | June 30, 1962 | 1940 Commonwealth Avenue, Boston |
| Helen Elizabeth Blake | 65 | June 30, 1962 | 73 Newhall Street, Lynn |
| Edes "Ida" Irga | 75 | August 19, 1962 | 7 Grove Street, Boston |
| Jane Sullivan | 67 | August 21, 1962 | 435 Columbia Road, Boston |
| Sophie L. Clark | 20 | December 5, 1962 | 315 Huntington Avenue, Boston |
| Patricia Jane Bissette | 23 | December 31, 1962 | 515 Park Drive, Boston |
| Mary Ann Brown | 69 | March 6, 1963 | 319 Park Street, Lawrence |
| Beverly Florence Samans | 26 | May 6, 1963 | 4 University Road, Cambridge |
| Marie Evelina "Evelyn" Corbin | 57 | September 8, 1963 | 224 Lafayette Street, Salem |
| Joann Marie Graff | 23 | November 25, 1963 | 54 Essex Street, Lawrence |
| Mary Anne Sullivan | 19 | January 4, 1964 | 44-A Charles Street, Boston |

== Imprisonment and death ==
DeSalvo was sentenced to life in prison in 1967. In February of that year, he escaped with two fellow inmates from Bridgewater State Hospital, triggering a full-scale manhunt. A note was found on his bunk addressed to the superintendent. In it, DeSalvo stated he had escaped to focus attention on the conditions in the hospital and his own situation. Three days later, DeSalvo contacted his lawyer to turn himself in. His lawyer then sent police to re-arrest him in Lynn, Massachusetts. Following the escape, DeSalvo was transferred to the maximum security prison known at the time as Walpole, where he later recanted his Strangler confessions.

On November 25, 1973, DeSalvo was found stabbed to death in the prison infirmary. Robert Wilson, who was associated with the Winter Hill Gang, was tried for DeSalvo's murder, but the trial ended in a hung jury. Bailey later stated that DeSalvo was killed for selling amphetamines in the prison for less than the inmate-enforced syndicate price.

DeSalvo's papers are housed in the Lloyd Sealy Library Special Collections at John Jay College of Criminal Justice in New York City. These papers include his correspondence, mainly with the members of the Bailey family, and gifts sent to the Baileys of jewelry and leatherwork crafted by DeSalvo while in prison.

== DNA evidence ==
On July 11, 2013, Boston law enforcement officials announced that DNA evidence had linked DeSalvo to the rape and murder of 19-year-old Mary Sullivan. DeSalvo's remains were exhumed, and DNA test results proved DeSalvo was the source of seminal fluid recovered at the scene of Sullivan's 1964 murder.

== Controversies ==
=== Doubts ===
Though DeSalvo was conclusively linked to Sullivan's murder, doubts remain as to whether he committed all of the Strangler homicides—and whether another killer could still be at large. When he confessed, people who knew DeSalvo personally did not believe him capable of the crimes. It was also noted that the women allegedly killed by the Strangler were of widely varying ages, social status and ethnicities, and that their deaths involved inconsistent modi operandi.

Susan Kelly, an author who has had access to the files of the Commonwealth of Massachusetts' "Strangler Bureau", argues that the murders were the work of several killers, rather than that of a single individual. Another author, former FBI profiler Robert Ressler, has said, "You're putting together so many different patterns [regarding the Strangler murders] that it's inconceivable behaviorally that all these could fit one individual."

In 2000, Elaine Whitfield Sharp, an attorney specializing in forensic cases from Marblehead, Massachusetts, began representing the families of DeSalvo and Sullivan. A former print journalist, Sharp obtained court approval to exhume both Sullivan and DeSalvo for DNA testing, filed several court actions to obtain information and physical evidence from the government and worked with various film producers to create documentaries so as to better educate the public. Through these efforts, Sharp was able to identify several inconsistencies between DeSalvo's confessions and the crime scene evidence.

For example, DeSalvo did not, as he claimed, strangle Sullivan with his bare hands; instead, she was strangled by ligature. Forensic pathologist Michael Baden noted that DeSalvo incorrectly stated the time of the victim's death—a detail that DeSalvo got wrong in several of the murders, said Kelly. Finally, James Starrs, professor of forensic science at George Washington University, told a news conference that a semen-like substance on Sullivan's body did not match DeSalvo's DNA and could not associate him with her murder.

Sullivan's nephew, Casey Sherman, wrote a book, A Rose for Mary (2003), in which he expanded upon the evidence—and leads from Kelly's book—to conclude that DeSalvo could not be responsible for her death, and to try to determine her killer's identity. Sharp continues to work on the case for the DeSalvo family.

On July 11, 2013, Suffolk County District Attorney Daniel F. Conley stated that DNA testing had revealed a "familial match" between DeSalvo and forensic evidence in the Sullivan killing, leading authorities to request the exhumation of DeSalvo's body in order to provide a definitive forensic link of DeSalvo to the murder. Nine days later, investigators announced that the comparison of crime scene evidence and DeSalvo's DNA "leaves no doubt that Albert DeSalvo was responsible for the brutal murder of Mary Sullivan."

=== George Nassar ===
George Nassar, the inmate DeSalvo reportedly confessed to, is among the suspects in the Strangler case. In 1967 he was given a life sentence for the shooting death of an Andover gas station attendant. In 2008 and again in 2009, the Massachusetts Supreme Judicial Court denied Nassar's appeals of his 1967 conviction. In 2006, Nassar argued in court filings that he had been unable to make his case in a previous appeal, because he was in federal prison in Leavenworth, Kansas, in the 1980s and therefore did not have access to legal resources in Massachusetts. The court noted that Nassar had returned to Massachusetts in 1983 yet he did not plead his case for more than two decades. He also filed a motion for a new trial in Essex County, which was denied, as was his 2011 petition to the United States Supreme Court for a writ of certiorari.

Ames Robey, a former prison psychiatrist who analyzed both DeSalvo and Nassar, has called Nassar a misogynistic, psychopathic killer and a far more likely suspect in the Strangler murders than DeSalvo. Several followers of the case have also declared Nassar to be the real Strangler, claiming that he fed details of the murders to DeSalvo. DeSalvo, they speculated, knew that he would spend the rest of his life in jail for the "Green Man" attacks and "confessed" so that Nassar could collect reward money that they would split—thus providing support to DeSalvo's wife and two children. Another motive was DeSalvo's tremendous need for notoriety. DeSalvo hoped that the case would make him famous; Robey testified that "Albert so badly wanted to be the Strangler."

In a 1999 interview with The Boston Globe, Nassar denied involvement in the murders, saying that the speculation had destroyed his chances for parole. "I had nothing to do with it," he said; "I'm convicted under the table, behind the scenes."

=== Other ===
In 1971, the Texas legislature unanimously passed a resolution honoring DeSalvo for his work in "population control". After the vote, Waco Representative Tom Moore Jr. admitted that he had submitted the legislation as an April Fool's Day joke against his colleagues—his declared intent was to prove that they pass legislation with no due diligence given to researching the issues beforehand. Having made his point, Moore withdrew the resolution.

== In popular culture ==
- The 1964 film The Strangler, starring Victor Buono, was based on the Boston Strangler Murders.
- DeSalvo was the subject of the 1968 Hollywood film The Boston Strangler, starring Tony Curtis as DeSalvo, and Henry Fonda and George Kennedy as the homicide detectives who apprehend him. The movie was highly fictionalized. It assumed that DeSalvo was guilty and portrayed him as someone suffering from multiple personality disorder (MPD) who committed the murders while in a psychotic state. DeSalvo was never diagnosed with, nor even suspected of, having MPD.
- The 2008 movie Boston Strangler: The Untold Story, focused on DeSalvo and told the story of the Boston murders. David Faustino played DeSalvo in the film.
- In the series finale of 1995 CBS show American Gothic, the show's primary antagonist, Lucas Buck, conjures DeSalvo's spirit to act as an instrument of assassination. DeSalvo was played by Gareth Williams.
- A waxwork of DeSalvo was featured in an episode of British comedy series Psychoville. The waxwork comes to life in a fantasy sequence (along with those of John George Haigh, John Christie, and Jack the Ripper), trying to persuade protagonist David Sowerbutts to kill a man by strangling. The others accuse DeSalvo of having several personalities, referencing the 1968 movie. He was played by Eric Loren.
- He was portrayed by David Dastmalchian in the 2023 Hulu film Boston Strangler.

In 1968 the Rolling Stones released a song titled Midnight Rambler, which is loosely based on the Boston Strangler murders.

== See also ==
- List of unsolved deaths
- List of serial killers in the United States
