= Carrie Coon =

American actress (born 1981)

- Coon in 2026
- Born: Carrie Alexandra Coon; January 24, 1981 (age 45); Copley, Ohio, U.S.
- Education: University of Mount Union (BA); University of Wisconsin–Madison (MFA)
- Occupation: Actress
- Years active: 2006–present
- Spouse: Tracy Letts (m. 2013)
- Children: 2

Carrie Alexandra Coon (born January 24, 1981) is an American stage, film, and television actress.

On television, her breakthrough role was as Nora Durst in the drama series The Leftovers (2014–2017), for which she won the Critics' Choice Award. She would gain further recognition playing a police chief in the third season of the black comedy crime anthology series Fargo (2017), a matriarch of a wealthy family in the period drama series The Gilded Age (2022–present), and a divorced lawyer in the third season of the satirical dramedy anthology series The White Lotus (2025), all of which earned her Primetime Emmy Award nominations, with The Gilded Age earning her two.

She made her film debut in Gone Girl (2014), with subsequent roles in films such as The Post (2017), Widows (2018), The Nest (2020), Boston Strangler (2023), and His Three Daughters (2024). She has acted in blockbuster films, such as Avengers: Infinity War (2018) and its sequel Avengers: Endgame (2019), and Ghostbusters: Afterlife (2021) and its sequel Ghostbusters: Frozen Empire (2024).

On stage, Coon made her Broadway debut as a naive newlywed in the revival of Who's Afraid of Virginia Woolf? (2012), for which she was nominated for the Tony Award for Best Featured Actress in a Play. She returned to Broadway playing a divorced waitress in the revival of the Tracy Letts play Bug (2026) for which she earned a nomination for the Tony Award for Best Actress in a Play.

== Early life ==
Carrie Alexandra Coon was born on January 24, 1981, in Copley, Ohio, to Paula (née Ploenes) and John Coon. She has an older sister, an older brother, and two younger brothers. She graduated from Copley High School in 1999, next attending the University of Mount Union, graduating in 2003 with a BA in English and Spanish. In 2006, she earned her MFA in acting from the University of Wisconsin–Madison.

== Career ==
=== 2006–2013: Early roles and stage work ===
Coon began her career in regional theater. After graduating from the University of Wisconsin-Madison, Coon was immediately recruited by the Madison Repertory Theatre and made her professional stage debut in a production of Our Town. After her debut with the Madison Repertory Theatre, Coon joined the American Players Theatre and stayed with them for four seasons. Coon moved to Chicago in 2008 and made her Chicago debut with a production of Brontë at Remy Bumppo Theatre Company. Coon commuted between Chicago and Wisconsin for several years, alternating between Chicago productions, productions in Milwaukee, and seasons with the American Players Theatre. During these years, Coon provided for herself by performing motion capture work for a video game company based in Wisconsin.

Coon's breakthrough came in 2010 when she was cast as Honey in the Steppenwolf Theatre Company production of Who's Afraid of Virginia Woolf? The role immediately resulted in further parts in Chicago productions, and she followed the production to performances in Washington, D.C. and New York City, making her Broadway debut. For her performance, she won a Theatre World Award and received a nomination for a Tony Award for Best Featured Actress in a Play. She starred opposite her future husband Tracy Letts. Steven Oxman of Variety described the Broadway revival as an "relentlessly intense" production adding that "Carrie Coon makes an especially sensitive, sympathetic Honey". Mark Kennedy of The Associated Press labeled the revival "astonishing" citing Coon as giving a performance of "great fragility".

Coon made her screen debut in an episode of the short-lived NBC series The Playboy Club in 2011. She later guest-starred on TV series Law & Order: Special Victims Unit, Ironside, and Intelligence.

=== 2014–2019: Acclaim in prestige television ===
Following her Tony Award nomination in 2014, Coon was cast as one of the main characters in the HBO drama series The Leftovers, alongside Justin Theroux, Amy Brenneman, and Ann Dowd. That same year, she made her film debut in Gone Girl, based on the 2012 novel of same name and directed by David Fincher.

In early 2015, Coon starred in the lead role of the Off-Broadway production of Placebo at Playwrights Horizons. She also participated in readings for her husband Tracy Letts' 2015–2016 season play Mary Page Marlowe and was in talks to perform in the production in Chicago if her filming schedule with The Leftovers permitted; in December 2015, it was announced that Coon would be one of six actresses portraying the title character in Mary Page Marlowe for the Steppenwolf Theatre Company in Chicago from March to May 2016. In April 2015, Coon left The Gersh Agency for United Talent Agency. In October and November 2015, Coon filmed the movie Strange Weather alongside actress Holly Hunter for director Katherine Dieckmann in Mississippi. In December 2015, she filmed the horror romance The Keeping Hours for director Karen Moncrieff and Blumhouse Productions.

Coon starred in the lead role of Gloria Burgle in the third season of the FX anthology series Fargo. She received a nomination for the Outstanding Lead Actress in a Limited Series or Movie for her role and won the TCA Award for Individual Achievement in Drama for both Fargo and The Leftovers. In 2017, she filmed Great Choice, a horror short mimicking a 1990s Red Lobster commercial. The same year she played real life journalist Meg Greenfield in the Steven Spielberg–directed historical drama film The Post. In 2018, Coon co-starred in the Steve McQueen heist thriller film Widows. Coon provided the voice and motion capture for Proxima Midnight, a member of the Black Order and a child of Thanos, in the superhero film Avengers: Infinity War (2018) directed by the Russo brothers.

=== 2020–present: Career expansion ===
Coon received a Canadian Screen Award nomination for Best Actress at the 9th Canadian Screen Awards in 2021 for her work in the film The Nest. On April 30, 2020, Coon joined the cast of the HBO drama series The Gilded Age as Bertha Russell, which began airing in 2022. She starred in the Azazel Jacobs family drama His Three Daughters (2023). The film follows three estranged daughters as they care for their dying father. Jon Frosch of The Hollywood Reporter wrote "Coon is masterful at conveying the space between those inner and outer selves." The film was picked up for distribution by Netflix and released in September 2024. In January 2024, Coon joined the cast of the third season of the HBO anthology series The White Lotus, which premiered in February 2025. In August 2025, it was announced that Coon would return to Broadway in Tracy Letts' play Bug at the Samuel J. Friedman Theater with performances starting in December 2025, reprising the role she played at the Steppenwolf Theatre Company in 2020 and 2021.

== Personal life ==
Coon married actor and playwright Tracy Letts in 2013. They have a son born in 2018 and a daughter born in 2021. Coon was pregnant while shooting the first season of The Gilded Age.

== Acting credits ==
=== Film ===
Key
†	Denotes films that have not yet been released

Year	Title	Role	Notes
2014	Gone Girl	Margo "Go" Dunne	
2016	Strange Weather	Byrd	
2017	The Keeping Hours	Elizabeth	
2017	Izzy Gets the F*ck Across Town	Virginia	
2017	The Post	Meg Greenfield	
2018	The Legacy of a Whitetail Deer Hunter	Linda Ferguson	
2018	Avengers: Infinity War	Proxima Midnight	
2018	Kin	Morgan Hunter	
2018	Widows	Amanda Nunn	
2020	The Nest	Allison O'Hara	
2021	Ghostbusters: Afterlife	Callie Spengler	
2023	Boston Strangler	Jean Cole	
2023	His Three Daughters	Katie	
2023	Another Happy Day	Irene	Also executive producer
2024	Ghostbusters: Frozen Empire	Callie Spengler	
2024	Lake George	Phyllis	
2026	The Liberation	Rita Cooper	
TBA	Honeymoon / Funeral	Sarah	Filming

=== Television ===
Year	Title	Role	Notes
2011	The Playboy Club	Doris Hall	Episode: "An Act of Simple Duplicity"
2013	Law & Order: Special Victims Unit	Talia Blaine	Episode: "Girl Dishonored"
2013	Ironside	Rachel Ryan	Episode: "Pilot"
2014	Intelligence	Luanne Vick	Episode: "Patient Zero"
2014–2017	The Leftovers	Nora Durst	Main role
2017	Fargo	Gloria Burgle	Main role (season 3)
2018	The Sinner	Vera Walker	Main role (season 2)
2021	What If...?	Proxima Midnight (voice)	Episode: "What If... T'Challa Became a Star-Lord?"
2022–present	The Gilded Age	Bertha Russell	Main role
2023	Teenage Euthanasia	Michelle's Mother (voice)	Episode: "Viva La Flappanista"
2025	The White Lotus	Laurie Duffy	Main role (season 3)
2025	The Simpsons	Beatrice Bouvier (voice)	Episode: "Sashes to Sashes"

=== Theatre ===
Year	Title	Role	Notes	Ref.
2006	Our Town	Emily	Overture Center for the Arts (Madison Repertory Theatre)	
2006	Romeo and Juliet	Ensemble	American Players Theatre (Spring Green, Wisconsin)	
2006	The Matchmaker	Ermengarde	American Players Theatre (Spring Green, Wisconsin)	
2006	Measure for Measure	Juliet	American Players Theatre (Spring Green, Wisconsin)	
2007	Anna Christie	Anna	Overture Center for the Arts	
2007	Misalliance	Hypatia	American Players Theatre	
2007	The Merchant of Venice	Ensemble	American Players Theatre	
2007	The Night of the Iguana	Charlotte	American Players Theatre	
2008	The Diary of Anne Frank	Miep Gies	Overture Center for the Arts	
2008	Brontë	Emily	Remy Bumppo Theatre Company (Chicago debut)	
2008	A Midsummer Night's Dream	Helena	American Players Theatre	
2008	Henry IV	Lady Percy	American Players Theatre	
2008	The Belle's Stratagem	Miss Ogle	American Players Theatre	
2009	Magnolia	Ariel	Goodman Theatre (Chicago)	
2009	Henry V	Kate	American Players Theatre	
2010	Blackbird	Una	Renaissance Theatreworks (Milwaukee)	
2010	Reasons to Be Pretty	Stephanie	Renaissance Theatreworks (Milwaukee)	
2010	Who's Afraid of Virginia Woolf?	Honey	Steppenwolf Theatre Company (Chicago)	
2011	Who's Afraid of Virginia Woolf?	Honey	Arena Stage (Washington, D.C.)	
2011	The Real Thing	Annie	Writers Theatre (Glencoe)	
2012	The Girl in the Yellow Dress	Celia	Next Theatre (Evanston)	
2012	Pretty Penny	Crystal	Writers Theatre	
2012	The March	Emily Thompson	Steppenwolf Theatre Company	
2012	Three Sisters	Masha	Steppenwolf Theatre Company	
2012	Who's Afraid of Virginia Woolf?	Honey	Booth Theatre (Broadway debut)	
2015	Placebo	Louise	Playwrights Horizons (Off-Broadway)	
2016	Mary Page Marlowe	Mary Page Marlowe (ages 27–36)	Steppenwolf Theatre Company (Chicago)	
2017	Mary Jane	Mary Jane	New York Theatre Workshop (Off-Broadway)	
2020	Bug	Agnes White	Steppenwolf Theatre Company (Chicago)	
2025	Bug	Agnes White	Samuel J. Friedman Theater, Broadway	

=== Podcasts ===
Year	Title	Role	Notes
2019	Motherhacker	Bridget Landry	Lead role

== Awards and nominations ==
Organizations	Year (Note: Refers to the year in which the ceremony was held. Where available, the year is linked to the specific ceremony's article.)	Category	Work	Result	Ref.
Actor Awards	2023	Outstanding Ensemble in a Drama Series (Note: Shared with cast)	The Gilded Age	Nominated	
Actor Awards	2026	Outstanding Ensemble in a Drama Series	The White Lotus	Nominated	
Canadian Screen Awards	2021	Best Actress	The Nest	Nominated	
Chicago Film Critics Association	2020	Best Actress	The Nest	Nominated	
Chicago International Film Festival	2026	Artistic Achievement Award	The Liberation'	Won	
Chlotrudis Awards	2018	Best Supporting Actress	Strange Weather	Nominated	
Critics' Choice Television Awards	2015	Best Supporting Actress in a Drama Series	The Leftovers	Nominated	
Critics' Choice Television Awards	2016	Best Actress in a Drama Series	The Leftovers	Won	
Critics' Choice Television Awards	2017	Best Actress in a Movie/Miniseries	Fargo	Nominated	
Critics' Choice Television Awards	2018	Best Actress in a Movie/Miniseries	The Sinner	Nominated	
Critics' Choice Television Awards	2026	Best Actress in a Drama Series	The Gilded Age	Nominated	
Dorian Award	2026	Outstanding Lead Performance in a Broadway Play	Bug	Nominated	
Drama Desk Award	2018	Outstanding Actress in a Play	Mary Jane	Nominated	
Empire Awards	2015	Best Female Newcomer	Gone Girl	Nominated	
Golden Globe Awards	2026	Best Supporting Actress – Series, Miniseries or Television Film	The White Lotus	Nominated	
Gotham Awards	2020	Best Actress	The Nest	Nominated	
Jeff Award	2019	Performer in a Principal Role – Play	Bug	Won	
Lucille Lortel Awards	2018	Outstanding Lead Actress in a Play	Mary Jane	Won	
MTV Movie & TV Awards	2018	Best Fight (Note: Shared with Scarlett Johansson, Danai Gurira, and Elizabeth Olsen)	Avengers: Infinity War	Nominated	
Obie Award	2018	Distinguished Performance by an Actress	Mary Jane	Won	
Primetime Emmy Awards	2017	Outstanding Lead Actress in a Limited Series or Movie	Fargo	Nominated	
Primetime Emmy Awards	2024	Outstanding Lead Actress in a Drama Series	The Gilded Age (episode: "Head to Head")	Nominated	
Primetime Emmy Awards	2025	Outstanding Supporting Actress in a Drama Series	The White Lotus (episode: "Amor Fati")	Nominated	
Primetime Emmy Awards	2026	Outstanding Lead Actress in a Drama Series	The Gilded Age (season three)	Nominated	
Satellite Awards	2018	Best Actress in a Drama Series	The Leftovers	Nominated	
Saturn Awards	2022	Best Supporting Actress	Ghostbusters: Afterlife	Nominated	
TCA Awards	2017	Individual Achievement in Drama	The Leftovers / Fargo	Won	
Theatre World Award	2013	Distinguished Performance Award	Who's Afraid of Virginia Woolf?	Won	
Tony Award	2013	Best Featured Actress in a Play	Who's Afraid of Virginia Woolf?	Nominated	
Tony Award	2026	Best Leading Actress in a Play	Bug	Nominated	
