= Bridgewater State Hospital =

Correctional facility in Massachusetts, USA

- Location in Massachusetts Bridgewater State Hospital (the United States)
- Location: Bridgewater, Massachusetts; 41°56′48″N 70°57′08″W
- Status: Operational
- Security class: Level 4 (Medium)
- Capacity: Operational Capacity: 294 Operational Occupancy: 74%
- Opened: 1855
- Managed by: Massachusetts Department of Correction
- Director: Superintendent Steve Kennedy

Bridgewater State Hospital, located in southeastern Massachusetts, is a state facility housing the criminally insane and those whose sanity is being evaluated for the criminal justice system. It was established in 1855 as an almshouse. It was then used as a workhouse for inmates with short sentences who worked the surrounding farmland. It was later rebuilt in the 1880s and again in 1974. As of January 6, 2020 there were 217 inmates in general population beds. The facility was the subject of the 1967 documentary Titicut Follies. Bridgewater State Hospital falls under the jurisdiction of the Massachusetts Department of Correction but its day-to-day operations are managed by Wellpath, a contracted vendor. Bridgewater State Hospital has recently been embroiled in controversy from human rights advocates and legal experts who argue that while the facility is regarded as a hospital, it denies its "patients" rights accorded to those who are in other psychiatric hospitals, and therefore calling on State legislators to expeditiously facilitate the transfer of the hospital from the Department of Corrections to Department of Mental Health [Bill S.1386 ].

== History ==
By the 1970s, the campus of the Massachusetts Correctional Institution at Bridgewater (MCIB) housed four separate facilities - the State Hospital for the Criminally Insane, the Treatment Center for Sexually Dangerous Persons, a center for alcoholics, and a minimum-security prison.

In 1968, hearings were conducted after a study showed that 30 inmates were committed to the state hospital illegally. Most of the prisoners stayed at Bridgewater because they did not have the legal skills or money available to help their claims. A number of the prisoners' terms had long expired. An example of this was a patient named Charles who was sentenced to Bridgewater in 1910 for breaking and entering. The maximum time for this felony was two years, and he still remained in the prison after 1967. Furthermore, in later news, the number of inmates at Bridgewater was found to have grown to 500. Some felt that society was not doing its job in distinguishing men who needed regular prison rehabilitation and psychiatric help. Changes were needed in what constitutes the criteria for a person to be sent to a mental hospital. Also among the changes that needed to be implemented were the confidentiality between the inmates and the doctors, as well as having a standard by which a person is considered criminally insane.

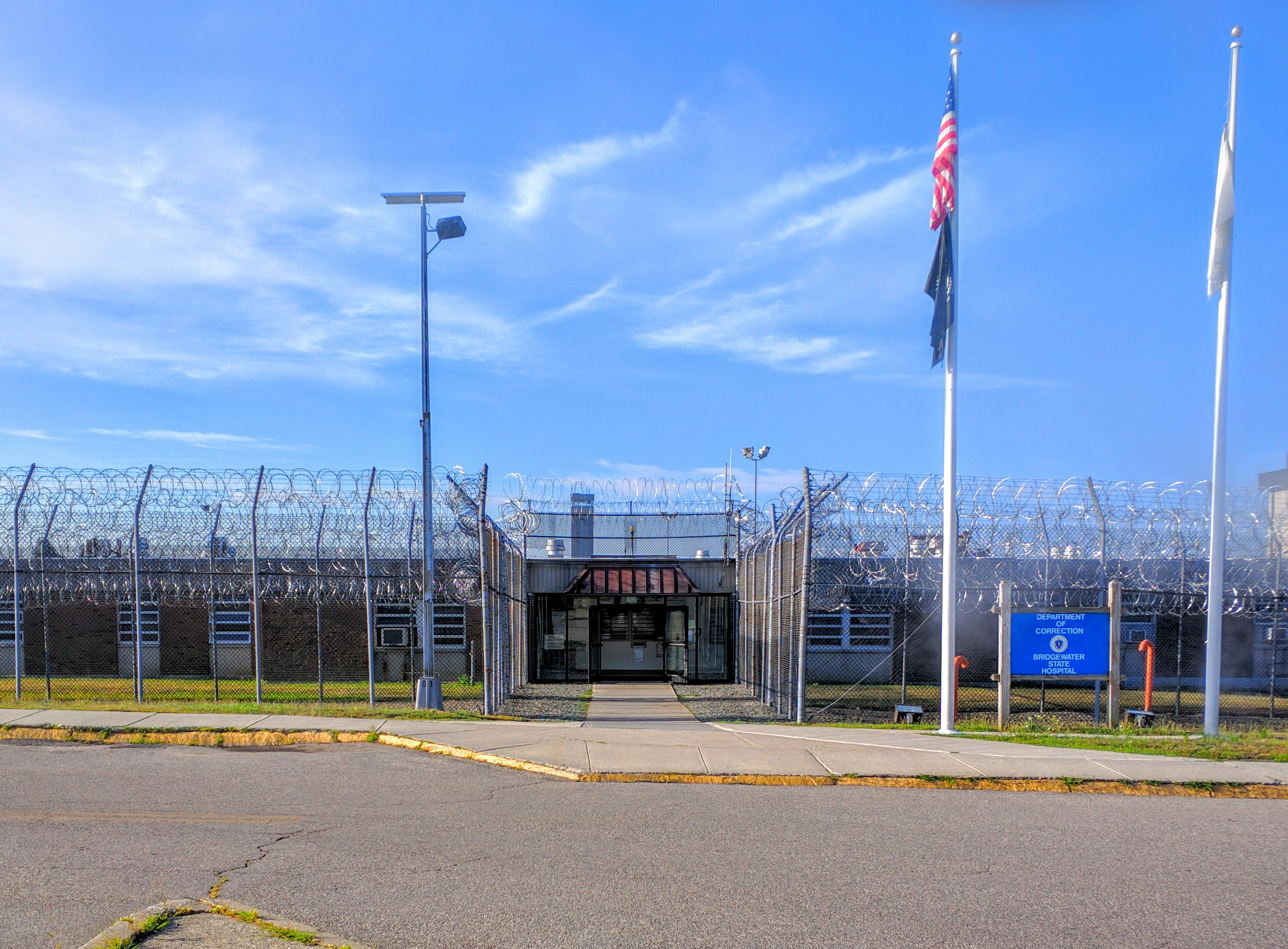
Bridgewater State Hospital in 2016

In 1967, a legislative committee investigated allegations of "cruel, inhuman, and barbarous treatment". Witnesses were able to describe problems with the water and sewage systems, and insufficient medical, kitchen, and recreational facilities. As a result, in 1972, John Boone, the Massachusetts Commissioner of Corrections, closed the segregation unit at Bridgewater State Hospital because it required maintenance. Bridgewater's facilities were not suitable for the standard means of health and living. Also, 90-year-old cell blocks did not have any toilets. Boone closed the Departmental Segregation Unit at Bridgewater to hold hearings for the 16 inmates who had been transferred out of Norfolk.

Albert DeSalvo, who confessed to being the Boston Strangler, was an inmate at Bridgewater in 1967. He briefly escaped and was transferred to the maximum-security prison at Walpole.

At one time at Bridgewater State Hospital, a number of the inmates were there long after their sentences were complete. In 1968, over 250 cases of forgotten men at Bridgewater were reviewed. Some inmates were at Bridgewater over 25 years. Some inmates were transferred to Bridgewater from other jails and prison facilities and kept at Bridgewater for much longer than their sentences required.

In September 2016, Governor Charlie Baker announced the hospital will be moving away from a historical prison model and toward a more clinical approach to the treatment of the mentally ill. According to the plan, every inmate will receive an individualized plan of treatment within 10 days of admission to the facility. Inmates who are on psychiatric medications would be seen by a psychiatrist on a timely basis and the facility would move to electronic health records.

== COVID cases ==
Pursuant to the Supreme Judicial Court's April 3, 2020 Opinion and Order in the Committee for Public Counsel Services v. Chief Justice of the Trial Court, SJC-12926 matter, as amended on April 10, April 28 and June 23, 2020 (the “Order”), the Special Master posts weekly reports which are located on the SJC website here for COVID testing and cases for each of the correctional facilities administered by the Department of Correction and each of the county Sheriffs’ offices. The SJC Special master link above has the most up to date information reported by the correctional agencies and is posted for the public to view.

== Documentary ==
Titicut Follies is a documentary film that highlights cases of patient mistreatment at Bridgewater in 1967. The film's title is taken directly from a name originally given to an annual talent show performed by the patients. Filmmaker Frederick Wiseman observed the hospital for 29 days, filming the harsh treatment the inmates received from the correctional officers, and how doctors were not aware of the proper treatment the inmates needed.

This was apparent with one inmate who was classified as a paranoid schizophrenic. He came to Bridgewater for medical testing, but ended up being a resident there. He received powerful medication that made his mental state worsen as time progressed. He went to a review board to explain that he did not need to be at Bridgewater because the treatment he was receiving was not proper for his well-being. His complaints were disregarded and the board suggested stronger doses of tranquilizers. His case was not rare at Bridgewater.

Throughout the film, the viewer can see the mistreatment inmates received from the guards and staff. In one instance, the guards were harassing an inmate because his cell was not clean. He was obviously mentally ill and frustrated by the repeated questions the guards asked him about his cell but he could not do much. Furthermore, one inmate was not eating, so he was force fed by one of the doctors at the facility. While force feeding him with a tube, the doctor smokes a cigarette, whose ashes mix with the water and other liquids he is giving the inmate. The documentary then flashed to the death of the same inmate. In addition, when the inmates were in their cells, they did not have any clothing.

Massachusetts attempted to block release of the film; much legal action followed. It ended up partially prohibited in the state of Massachusetts (only).

== Officer deaths at Bridgewater ==
- February 13, 1928 – Nightwatchman Wilfred Gerrior and night supervisor George E. Amlaw were strangled to death and clubbed during an escape attempt.
- January 1, 1942 – Two inmates beat officer Franklin Weston to death in the carpenter shop, where they stole several tools to use as weapons; they were shortly discovered by Howard Murphy, whom they attacked and killed. They later encountered officer George Landry and beat him to death.

== Controversy and reform ==
2017 A major reform initiative by Massachusetts Governor Charlie Baker replaced management of the hospital and four-fifths of the staff, granted a significant amount of turnaround funding, removed uniformed guards, and closed the "intensive treatment" unit where forced restraints and solitary confinement were used. After about five months with a new system of conflict prevention and resolution, a visiting The Boston Globe reporter said that the institution felt more like a hospital than a prison after the reform.

2014 A civil lawsuit was settled out of court regarding a patient's declining health from abuse, namely, being excessively restrained and secluded. The particular patient had spent over 6000 hours in isolation, despite never having had been convicted of a crime.

2014 Massachusetts Governor Deval Patrick formally reprimanded Administration officials regarding their attempts to cover up procedural mishaps, including the use of forced restraint, that precipitated the death of a patient in 2009. Then-superintendent Karin Bergeron was exposed in internal e-mails as having attempted to cover up reports of the murdered patient's death after it was ruled a homicide.

2014 The Boston Globe published an exposé on how the use of forced restraints—in which patients are bound to a table by hands and legs—increased over a five-year period at an alarmingly high rate, in spite of the death of a patient in 2009 resulting from the use of such "four point restraints".

The Department of Correction's own Internal Affairs Unit had formally found that in 2011, facility officers Howard and Raposo had violated a procedural policy that states that guards shall never put pressure on a restrained inmate's back. Surveillance video revealed that the two guards pushed down on a handcuffed patient's back with force, forcing his chest toward his knees, a maneuver sometimes called "suitcasing." According to the article:

In December 2013 alone, Bridgewater State Hospital, with a population that hovers around 325, held patients in seclusion and restraints for more than 13,000 hours—a rate of 1,491 hours per 1,000 patient days, vastly more than other state-run psychiatric facilities. Five Department of Mental Health facilities with about 626 in-patient beds held patients in seclusion and restraints for a total of only 135 hours in that month—7.07 hours per 1,000 patient days.

2012 Fox News Boston released the security camera footage of officers strapping down a patient whose death had been ruled a homicide in 2009. The tape's footage is controversial because officer Derek Howard could be seen using an illegal restraint practice.

2009 A patient was killed when improperly restrained. The man's family was awarded $3 million in damages to settle a lawsuit. At that time Massachusetts Governor Deval Patrick called for an investigation into the practices at Bridgewater.

2008 George A. Billadeau, a police Sergeant at the facility, was the subject of a formal complaint that accused him of making a racial slur to a patient

2007, The Disability Law Center, a human rights advocacy firm in Boston, sued Bridgewater State Hospital over illegally restraining a patient.

2007 A patient committed suicide by hanging himself in the showers while there on a 30-day court evaluation when BSH staff failed to prevent it.

2004 The family of murdered inmate William Mosher planned to sue the state and BSH for $150 million for failing to protect their son.

2004 William Mosher Jr., a patient who suffered from bipolar disorder, was murdered in his room by a fellow inmate when the facility failed to protect him by keeping his enemy away.

1999 Massachusetts Correctional Legal Services served and won a successful lawsuit against Bridgewater for an officer throwing acid in a patient's face. Until the lawsuit, the DOC and BSH had dropped the investigation midway through.

1989 ABC News' Nightline broadcast a TV news special outlining mistreatment of the patients at Bridgewater State Hospital

1987 After eight patient deaths in a year, The New York Times published an exposé on Bridgewater State Hospital and its poor treatment of patients.
