= The Boston Strangler (film) =

1968 film by Richard Fleischer

- Theatrical release poster
- Directed by: Richard Fleischer
- Screenplay by: Edward Anhalt
- Based on: The Boston Strangler (1966 book) by Gerold Frank
- Produced by: Robert Fryer
- Starring: Tony Curtis; Henry Fonda; George Kennedy; Mike Kellin; Murray Hamilton; Sally Kellerman
- Cinematography: Richard H. Kline
- Edited by: Marion Rothman
- Music by: Lionel Newman
- Distributed by: 20th Century-Fox
- Release date: October 16, 1968
- Running time: 116 minutes
- Country: United States
- Language: English
- Budget: $4.1 million
- Box office: $17.8 million

The Boston Strangler is a 1968 American biographical crime thriller film directed by Richard Fleischer, based on the true story of the Boston Strangler and the 1966 non-fiction book The Boston Strangler by Gerold Frank. It stars Tony Curtis as Albert DeSalvo, the man who eventually confessed to being the Strangler, Henry Fonda and George Kennedy as lead investigators John S. Bottomly and Phil DiNatale, and Sally Kellerman as the composite character Dianne Cluny, one of the strangler's surviving victims. The cast also features Mike Kellin, Murray Hamilton, Hurd Hatfield, Jeff Corey, William Marshall, George Voskovec and William Hickey.

The film is one of four directed by Fleischer that are based on real-life murder cases—The Girl in the Red Velvet Swing (1955), based on Harry Kendall Thaw; Compulsion (1959), based on the Leopold and Loeb case; and 10 Rillington Place (1971), based on John Christie. It posits DeSalvo—the suspect who confessed to being the Strangler while in police custody—as being the perpetrator, and suffering from dissociative identity disorder (DID). In reality, the validity of DeSalvo's confession was disputed and later recanted, and he was never diagnosed with DID.

The Boston Strangler was released in the United States on October 16, 1968, by 20th Century Fox. It was a box-office success, grossing more than $17 million, but received mixed reviews from critics, with several deriding it as an exploitation film that feature a number of inaccuracies in its depiction of the actual crimes and of DeSalvo. Curtis was nominated for a Golden Globe Award for Best Actor – Drama.

== Plot ==
After three murders of elderly women, the victims having been strangled and penetrated with foreign objects, the Boston police conclude that they have a serial killer to catch: the Boston Strangler. As the murders stretch over several police jurisdictions, Massachusetts Attorney General Edward W. Brooke appoints John S. Bottomly as head of a "Strangler Bureau" to coordinate the investigation. Several suspects are interrogated and released.

As the body count grows, Bottomly, in desperation, calls in a psychic, Peter Hurkos, who pinpoints Eugene T. O'Rourke, a man who seems to fit the profile. The severely masochistic O'Rourke is taken in for psychiatric observation for ten days but nothing implicates him in the murders. Another murder is committed while O'Rourke is under observation, clearing him of suspicion.

While the 1963 funeral of John F. Kennedy is on television, Albert DeSalvo leaves his wife Irmgard and children, under the pretext of work. He gains entry into the apartment of a woman, Dianne Cluny, by posing as a plumber sent by the building supervisor. He attacks her, tying her to her bed with rags ripped from her dress. DeSalvo is taken aback by the sight of himself in a mirror as he tries to subdue Dianne. She struggles free and bites his hand; DeSalvo flees.

He tries to enter the apartment of another woman, but finds that her husband is home. DeSalvo is apprehended by a passing police patrol. Found incompetent to stand trial for attempted breaking and entering, he is committed to a hospital for psychiatric observation. By chance, Bottomly and Detective Phil DiNatale pass DeSalvo in an elevator; they had been visiting Dianne, who survived the earlier attack. Observing the wound on DeSalvo's hand (Dianne, who survived his attack, could remember biting him but not his appearance), the pair makes him a suspect for the Boston Strangler murders.

Conventional interrogation is ineffective because the treating physician thinks that DeSalvo suffers from a split personality: he has two identities that are unaware of each other. His "normal" personality fabricates memories in place of the memories of murder committed by the "strangler" personality. The treating physician, Dr. Nagy, thinks that DeSalvo could be forced to confront the facts but that the resulting shock risks putting him in a catatonic state. Bottomly expresses the opinion that catatonia would be the second-best thing to a conviction.

Under the condition imposed by DeSalvo's defense counsel that none of what comes to light is admissible evidence in court, Bottomly is allowed a final round of interviews with DeSalvo. After several sessions, Bottomly manages to reveal DeSalvo's hidden personality. Reeling from the shock, DeSalvo slips into a catatonic state.

== Cast ==
- Tony Curtis as Albert DeSalvo
- Henry Fonda as John S. Bottomly
- George Kennedy as Phil DiNatale
- Mike Kellin as Julian Soshnick
- Hurd Hatfield as Terence Huntley
- Murray Hamilton as Frank McAfee
- Jeff Corey as John Asgeirsson
- Sally Kellerman as Dianne Cluny
- William Marshall as Edward W. Brooke
- George Voskovec as Peter Hurkos
- Leora Dana as Mary Bottomly
- Carolyn Conwell as Irmgard DeSalvo
- Jeanne Cooper as Cloe
- Austin Willis as Dr. Nagy
- Lara Lindsay as Bobbie Eden
- William Hickey as Eugene T. O'Rourke
- George Furth as Lyonel Brumley
- Carole Shelley as Dana Banks
- Gwyda Donhow as Alice Oakville
- Richard X. Slattery as Capt. Ed Willis
- James Brolin as Detective Sgt. Phil Lisi
- Dana Elcar as Luis Schubert
- Almira Sessions as Emma Hodak
- Karen Huston as Patricia Bruner
- Arthur Hanson as Police Commissioner Edmund McNamara
- David Lewis as Judge Schroeder

== Production ==
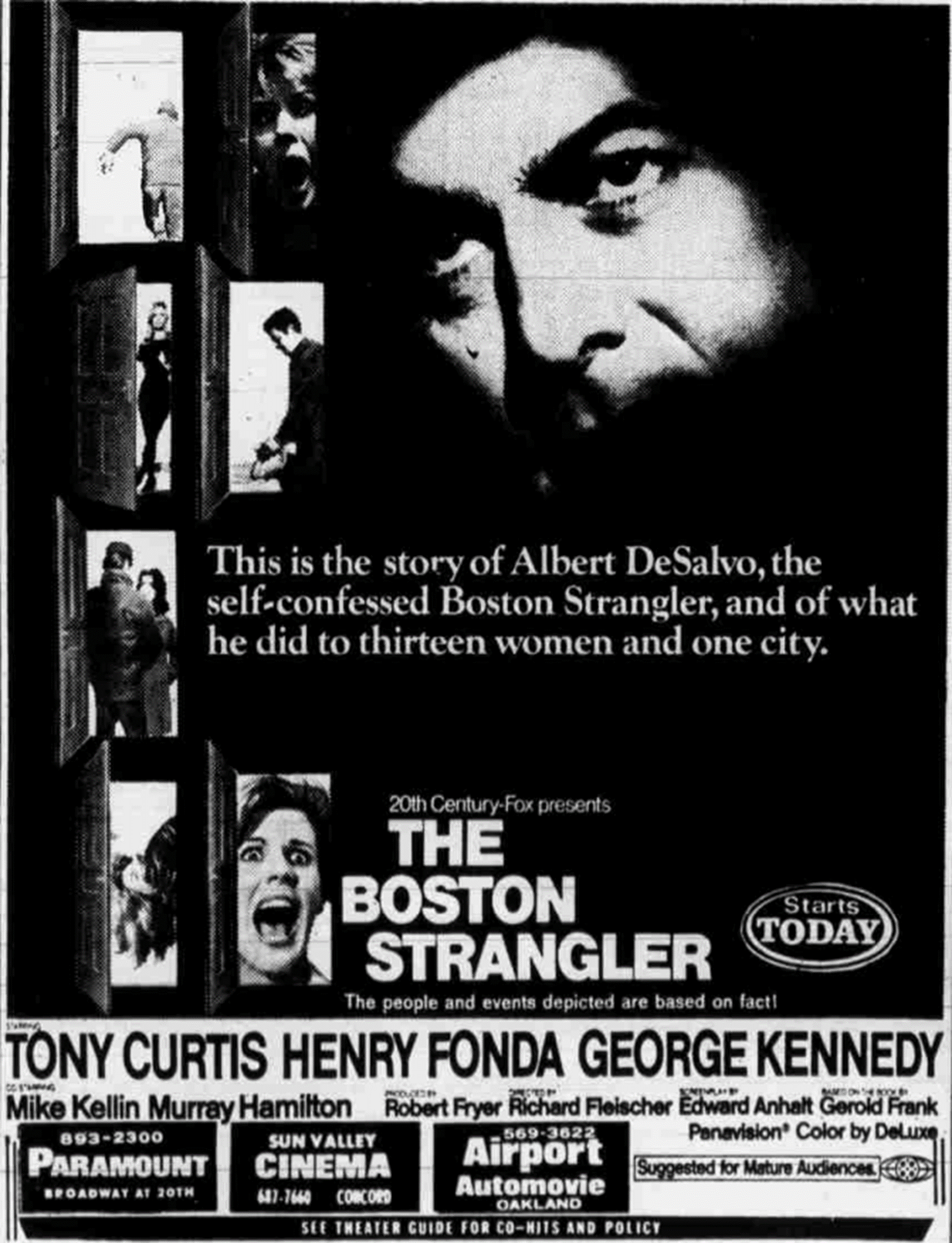
Theatrical advertisement from 1968

Film rights to Gerold Frank's book The Boston Strangler were bought for $250,000 (equivalent to $2.48 million in 2025). Terence Rattigan was hired to write the script, but the producer was unhappy with it. Edward Anhalt was subsequently hired. Director Richard Fleischer got the job based on his work on Compulsion, a dramatization of the Leopold and Loeb murders.

Filming took place on-location in Boston and at 20th Century Fox studios in Los Angeles. Due to the subject matter, many individuals and agencies in Boston were unsupportive of the film's production. According to a 1968 Philadelphia Inquirer article:

Boston Police Commissioner Edward McNamara insists it would be highly improper to cooperate with the filmmakers in a story about murder rampage which hasn't been officially resolved....[Producer Robert] Fryer asked for permission to use Boston policecars. The answer was no. A letter from Commissioner McNamara also made it plain that police personnel would not be authorized to work as extras on the film, a practice that had been approved in two other pictures that went on location in Boston last year. Another request to bring cameras into police headquarters for one scene was deleted. Fryer couldn't even get permission to take still photos of the offices of the attorney general and the local police commissioner so that they could at least be reproduced back at the studio in Hollywood. Not a soul was willing to cooperate, not even local hospitals. One scene required Fonda to walk out of a hospital...."We asked for permission at two hospitals, Massachusetts General and Beth Israel," Fryer complained, "Both turned us down."

== Historical accuracy ==
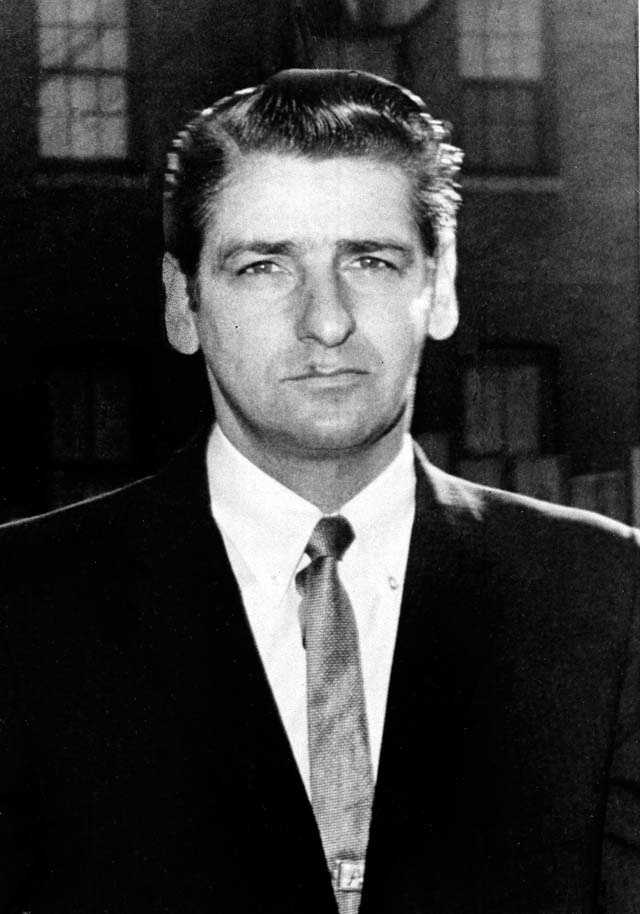
Albert DeSalvo in 1967.

The film posits Albert DeSalvo (Tony Curtis) as the Boston Strangler, and depicts him as suffering from a dissociative identity disorder (DID), confessing to the murders only after John S. Bottomly (Henry Fonda) induces his alternate personality. Although DeSalvo's real attorney, F. Lee Bailey, did attempt to mount an insanity defense, it was never suggested by him nor the prosecution that DeSalvo suffered from DID, and he was never diagnosed with it. DeSalvo confessed to the murders while under hypnosis (without Bottomly) and without hypnosis (with Bottomly), and was incarcerated at a mental hospital after his conviction. DeSalvo would later recant both confessions.

DeSalvo's actual guilt remains a source of controversy. He was never prosecuted for the Strangler murders, but he was tried on separate charges of sexual assault and robbery. A 2013 DNA test definitively linked him to at least one of the Stranger's victims, Mary Ann Sullivan.

Dianne Cluny (Sally Kellerman) is a composite character, based partly on the "Green Man" victim who identified DeSalvo to authorities.

== Reception ==
=== Box office ===
According to 20th Century Fox records, the film required $8,625,000 in rentals to break even, and by December 11, 1970, it had made $11,125,000, earning a profit to the studio.

=== Critical response ===
Film critic Roger Ebert of the Chicago Sun-Times gave the film three stars out of four, but criticized its content:

The Boston Strangler requires a judgment not only on the quality of the film (very good), but also on its moral and ethical implications.... The events described in Frank's book have been altered considerably in the film. This is essentially a work of fiction 'based' on the real events. And based on them in such a way to entertain us, which it does, but for the wrong reasons, I believe. This film, which was made so well, should not have been made at all.

In the same vein, The New York Times film critic Renata Adler wrote:

The Boston Strangler represents an incredible collapse of taste, judgment, decency, prose, insight, journalism and movie technique, and yet—through certain prurient options that it does not take—it is not quite the popular exploitation film that one might think. It is as though someone had gone out to do a serious piece of reporting and come up with 4,000 clippings from a sensationalist tabloid. It has no depth, no timing, no facts of any interest and yet, without any hesitation, it uses the name and pretends to report the story of a living man, who was neither convicted nor indicted for the crimes it ascribes to him. Tony Curtis 'stars'—the program credits word—as what the movie takes to be the Boston strangler.

In 2004, film critic Dennis Schwartz of the Vermont-based Ozus's World Movie Reviews discussed the film's style:

What mostly filled the split-screen was the many interrogation scenes, where on one side was the suspect and interrogator in the present and on the other side the suspect and his interrogator in flashbacks. Fleischer eschews the graphic violence in the murders and aims instead to try to understand the killer through the script's bogus psychology. The big things the film tried didn't pan out as that interesting, as the flashy camera work counteracts the conventional storyline chronicling the rise, manhunt, fall, and prosecution of De Salvo.

Japanese filmmaker Kiyoshi Kurosawa called The Boston Strangler one of his favorite films. "There is no other work that so vividly shows how accurate cinematic expression is. Maybe it has something to do with how fast it moves. I learned a lot from this film. But I think this can only be done by a genius."

On the review aggregator website Rotten Tomatoes, 88% of 17 critics' reviews are positive. Metacritic, which uses a weighted average, assigned the film a score of 66 out of 100, based on 13 critics, indicating "generally favorable" reviews.

=== Accolades ===
Institution	Category	Nominee	Result	Ref.
American Cinema Editors	Best Edited Feature Film	Marion Rothman	Won	
Golden Globe Awards	Best Actor - Drama	Tony Curtis	Nominated	
Edgar Awards	Best Motion Picture Screenplay	Edward Anhalt	Nominated	

== Home media ==
20th Century Fox Home Entertainment released the film on DVD in 2004. Twilight Time released a limited-edition Blu-ray on November 15, 2016.

== See also ==
- List of American films of 1968

== Sources ==
- Dunne, John Gregory (1969). The Studio. New York City, New York: Farrar, Straus & Giroux. p. 23-24. ISBN 978-0-491-00344-5.
- Silverman, Stephen M (1988). The Fox That Got Away: The Last Days of the Zanuck Dynasty at Twentieth Century-Fox. New York City, New York: L. Stuart. ISBN 978-0-818-40485-6.
- Smith, Frederick Y., ed. (1971). American Cinema Editors, Inc: ACE Second Decade Anniversary Book. American Cinema Editors, Incorporated. OCLC 658631.
- Solomon, Aubrey (1989). Twentieth Century Fox: A Corporate and Financial History. Lanham, Maryland: Scarecrow Press. ISBN 978-0-8108-4244-1.
