= Boston Strangler =

Murderer of 13 women in the Boston area

Details
- Victims: 13
- Span of crimes: June 14, 1962 – January 4, 1964
- Country: United States
- State: Massachusetts
- Target: Women
- Weapon: Nylon stockings or housecoat cords

The Boston Strangler is the murderer of 13 women in Greater Boston during the early 1960s. The crimes were attributed to Albert DeSalvo (1931–1973) based on his confession, on details revealed in court during a separate case, and DNA evidence linking him to the final victim.

In the years following DeSalvo's conviction – but prior to the emergence of this DNA evidence – various parties investigating the crimes suggested that the murders (sometimes referred to as the "Silk Stocking Murders") were committed by more than one person.

== Names ==
Initially, the crimes were assumed to be the work of one unknown person dubbed "The Mad Strangler of Boston". On July 8, 1962, the Sunday Herald wrote that "[a] mad strangler is loose in Boston" in an article titled "Mad Strangler Kills Four Women in Boston". The killer was also known as the "Phantom Fiend" or "Phantom Strangler", due to his ability to get women to allow him into their apartments. In 1963, two investigative reporters for the Record American, Jean Cole and Loretta McLaughlin, wrote a four-part series about the killer, dubbing him "The Boston Strangler". By the time that DeSalvo's confession was aired in open court, the name "Boston Strangler" had become part of crime lore.

== Events ==
Between June 14, 1962, and January 4, 1964, 13 single women between the ages of 19 and 85 were murdered in the Boston area. Most were sexually assaulted and strangled in their apartments. Originally, the police believed that one man was the sole perpetrator. With no sign of forced entry into their homes, the women were assumed to have let their assailant in, either because they may have known him or because they believed him to be a service provider. The attacks continued despite extensive media publicity after the first few murders. Many residents purchased tear gas and new locks and deadbolts for their doors. Some women even moved out of the area in response to the killings.

The murders occurred in several cities, including Boston, complicating jurisdictional oversight for prosecution of the crimes. Massachusetts Attorney General Edward W. Brooke helped to coordinate the various police forces. He permitted parapsychologist Peter Hurkos to use his alleged extrasensory perception to analyze the cases, for which Hurkos claimed that a single person was responsible. This decision was controversial. Hurkos provided a "minutely detailed description of the wrong person", and the press ridiculed Brooke. The police were not convinced that all the murders were the actions of one person, although much of the public believed so. The apparent connections between a majority of the victims and hospitals were widely discussed.

The final victim of the murders was 19-year-old Mary Sullivan, who was raped and strangled in her Boston apartment on January 4, 1964. Three ligatures were wrapped around her neck, and a broom handle was lodged in her vagina. A card reading "Happy New Year" was left by the killer, leaning against her left foot.

== Victims ==
Name	Age	Date of murder	Location of body
Anna Elza Slesers	55	June 14, 1962	77 Gainsborough Street, Boston
Mary Mullen	85	June 28, 1962	1435 Commonwealth Avenue, Boston
Nina Nioma Nichols	68	June 30, 1962	1940 Commonwealth Avenue, Boston
Helen Elizabeth Blake	65	June 30, 1962	73 Newhall Street, Lynn
Edes "Ida" Irga	75	August 19, 1962	7 Grove Street, Boston
Jane Sullivan	67	August 21, 1962	435 Columbia Road, Boston
Sophie L. Clark	20	December 5, 1962	315 Huntington Avenue, Boston
Patricia Jane Bissette	23	December 31, 1962	515 Park Drive, Boston
Mary Ann Brown	69	March 6, 1963	319 Park Street, Lawrence
Beverly Florence Samans	23	May 8, 1963	4 University Road, Cambridge
Marie Evelina "Evelyn" Corbin	57	September 8, 1963	224 Lafayette Street, Salem
Joann Marie Graff	23	November 23, 1963	54 Essex Street, Lawrence
Mary Anne Sullivan	19	January 4, 1964	44-A Charles Street, Boston

== DeSalvo's confession ==
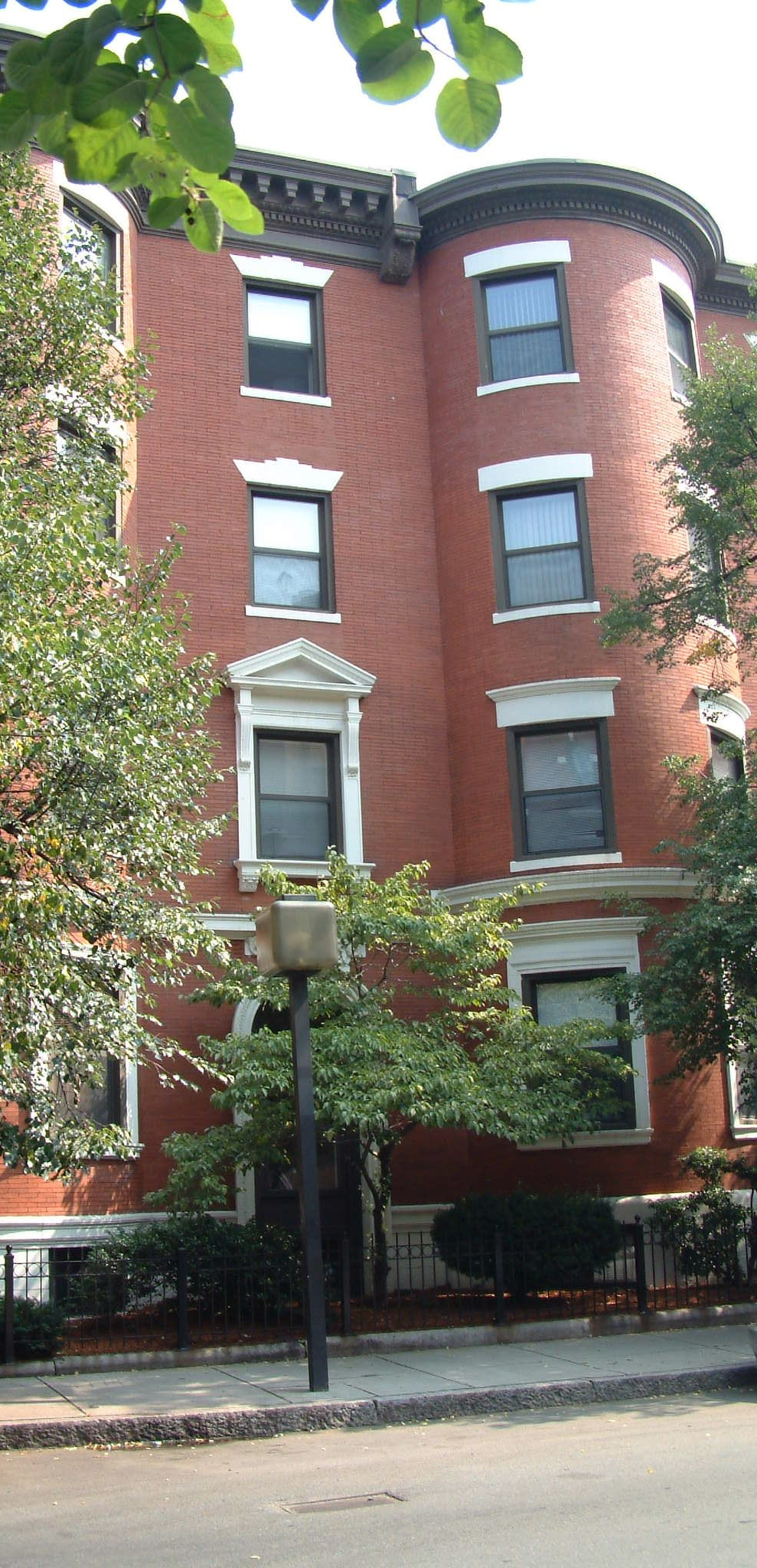
Gainsborough Street, site of the first murder attributed to the Boston Strangler

On October 27, 1964, a stranger entered a young woman's home posing as a detective. He tied the victim to her bed, sexually assaulted her, and suddenly left, saying "I'm sorry" as he went. The woman's description of her attacker led police to identify the assailant as DeSalvo. When his photo was published, many women identified him as the man who had assaulted them. Earlier on October 27, DeSalvo had posed as a motorist with car trouble and attempted to enter a home in Bridgewater, Massachusetts. The homeowner, future Brockton police chief Richard Sproules, became suspicious and eventually fired a shotgun at DeSalvo.

DeSalvo was not initially suspected of being involved with the strangling murders. After he was charged with rape, he gave a detailed confession of his activities as the Boston Strangler. He initially confessed to fellow inmate George Nassar. Nassar reported the confession to his attorney F. Lee Bailey, who also took on the defense of DeSalvo. The police were impressed at the accuracy of DeSalvo's descriptions of the crime scenes. There were some inconsistencies, but DeSalvo was able to cite details that had been withheld from the public. Bailey states in his 1971 book, The Defense Never Rests, that DeSalvo even got one detail right that one of the victims was wrong about: DeSalvo described a blue chair in the woman's living room. She stated it was brown. Photographic evidence proved DeSalvo was correct.

No physical evidence substantiated his confession. Because of that, he was tried on charges for earlier, unrelated, crimes of robbery and sexual offenses, in which he was known as "The Green Man" and "The Measuring Man", respectively. Bailey brought up DeSalvo's confession to the murders as part of his client's history at the trial in order to assist in gaining a "not guilty by reason of insanity" verdict to the sexual offenses, but it was ruled as inadmissible by the judge.

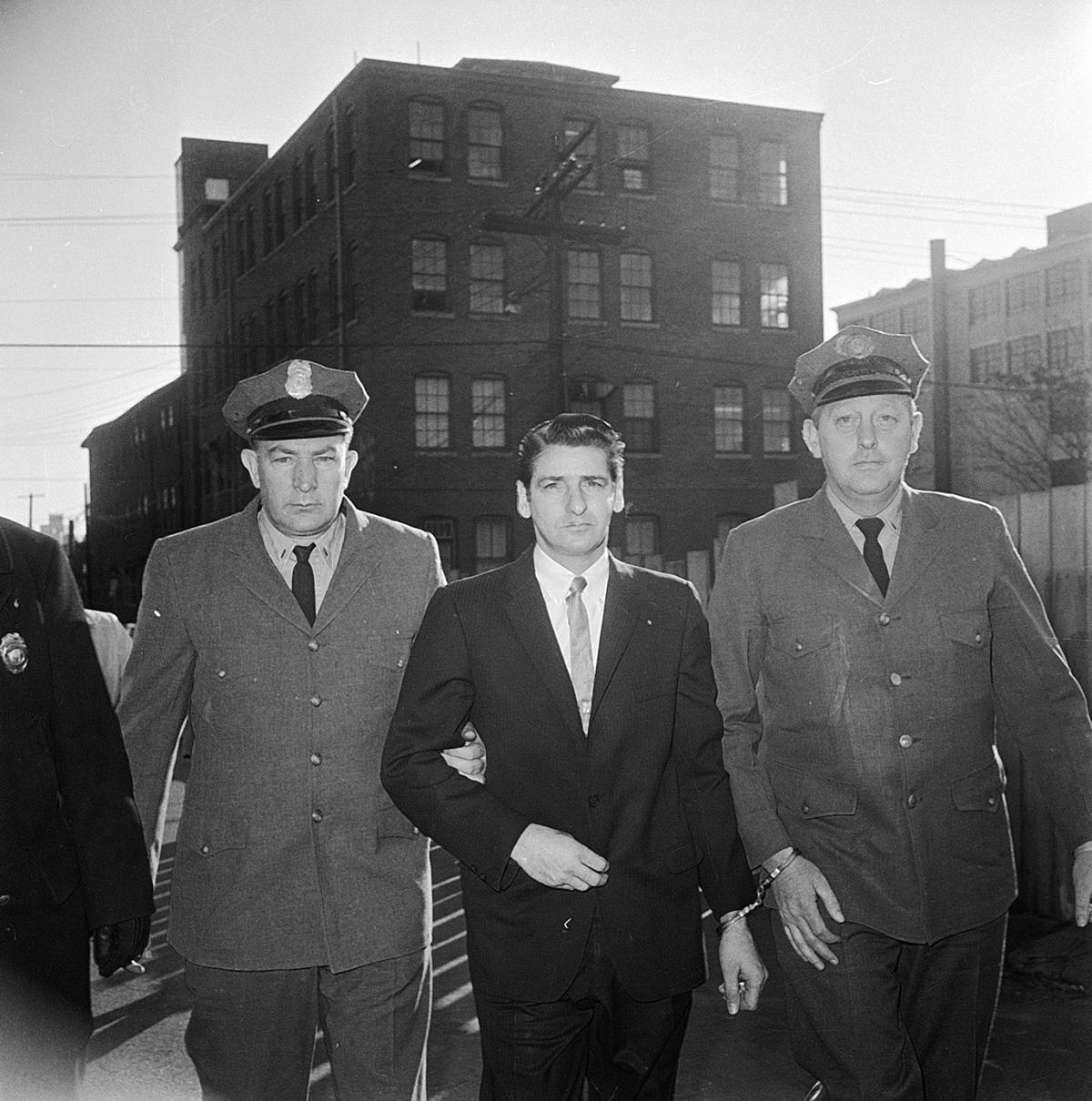
DeSalvo after his rearrest after escaping Bridgewater State Hospital in 1967

DeSalvo was sentenced to life in prison in 1967. In February of that year, he escaped with two fellow inmates from Bridgewater State Hospital, triggering a full-scale manhunt. A note was found on his bunk addressed to the superintendent. In it, DeSalvo stated that he had escaped to focus attention on the conditions in the hospital and his own situation. Immediately after his escape, DeSalvo disguised himself as a U.S. Navy Petty Officer Third Class, but he gave himself up the following day. After the escape, he was transferred to the maximum security Walpole State Prison. Six years after the transfer, he was found stabbed to death in the prison infirmary. His killer or killers were never identified.

== Multiple-killer theories ==
Doubts persist as to whether DeSalvo was the sole perpetrator behind the Boston Strangler murders. At the time of his confession, people who knew him personally did not believe him capable of such vicious crimes. Several factors created doubt that a serial killer was involved, given that they characteristically have a certain type of victim and method of murder: women killed by "The Strangler" were from a variety of age and ethnic groups, and they were murdered using multiple methods.

In 1968, Dr. Ames Robey, medical director of Bridgewater State Hospital, insisted that DeSalvo was not the Boston Strangler. He said the prisoner was "a very clever, very smooth compulsive confessor who desperately needs to be recognized." Robey's opinion was shared by Middlesex District Attorney John J. Droney, Bridgewater Superintendent Charles Gaughan, and George W. Harrison, a former fellow inmate of DeSalvo's. Harrison claimed to have overheard another convict coaching DeSalvo about details of the strangling murders.

DeSalvo's attorney Bailey believed that his client was the killer, and described the case in The Defense Never Rests (1971). Susan Kelly, author of the book The Boston Stranglers (1996), drew from the files of the Commonwealth of Massachusetts "Strangler Bureau". She argues that the murders were the work of several killers rather than a single individual. Former FBI profiler Robert Ressler said, "You're putting together so many different patterns [regarding the Boston Strangler murders] that it's inconceivable behaviorally that all these could fit one individual."

John E. Douglas, the former FBI special agent who was one of the first criminal profilers, doubted that DeSalvo was the Boston Strangler. In his book The Cases That Haunt Us, he identified DeSalvo as a "power-assurance" motivated rapist. He said that such a rapist is unlikely to kill in the manner of crimes attributed to the Boston Strangler; a power-assurance motivated rapist would, however, be prone to taking credit for the crimes.

In 2000, attorney and former print journalist Elaine Sharp took up the cause of the DeSalvo family and that of the family of Mary Sullivan. Sullivan was publicized as being the final victim in 1964, although other strangling murders occurred after that date. Sharp assisted the families in their media campaign to clear DeSalvo's name. She helped organize and arrange the exhumations of Mary Sullivan and Albert H. DeSalvo, filed various lawsuits in attempts to obtain information and trace evidence (e.g., DNA) from the government, and worked with various producers to create documentaries to explain the facts to the public.

Sharp noted various inconsistencies between DeSalvo's confessions and the crime scene information (which she obtained). For example, she observed that, contrary to DeSalvo's confession to Sullivan's murder, the woman was found to have no semen in her vagina and she was not strangled manually, but by ligature. Forensic pathologist Michael Baden noted that DeSalvo got the time of death wrong. This was a common inconsistency also pointed out by Susan Kelly in several of the murders. She continued to work on the case for the DeSalvo family.

== DNA evidence ==
On July 11, 2013, the Boston Police Department announced that they had found DNA evidence that linked DeSalvo to the murder of Mary Sullivan. DNA found at the scene was a "near certain match" to Y-DNA taken from a nephew of DeSalvo. Y-DNA is passed through the direct male lines with little change and can be used to link males with a common paternal-line ancestor. A court ordered the exhumation of DeSalvo's corpse to test his DNA directly. On July 19, 2013, Suffolk County District Attorney Daniel F. Conley, Massachusetts Attorney General Martha Coakley and Boston Police Commissioner Edward F. Davis announced the DNA test results proving that DeSalvo was the source of seminal fluid recovered at the scene of Sullivan's 1964 murder.

== In popular culture ==
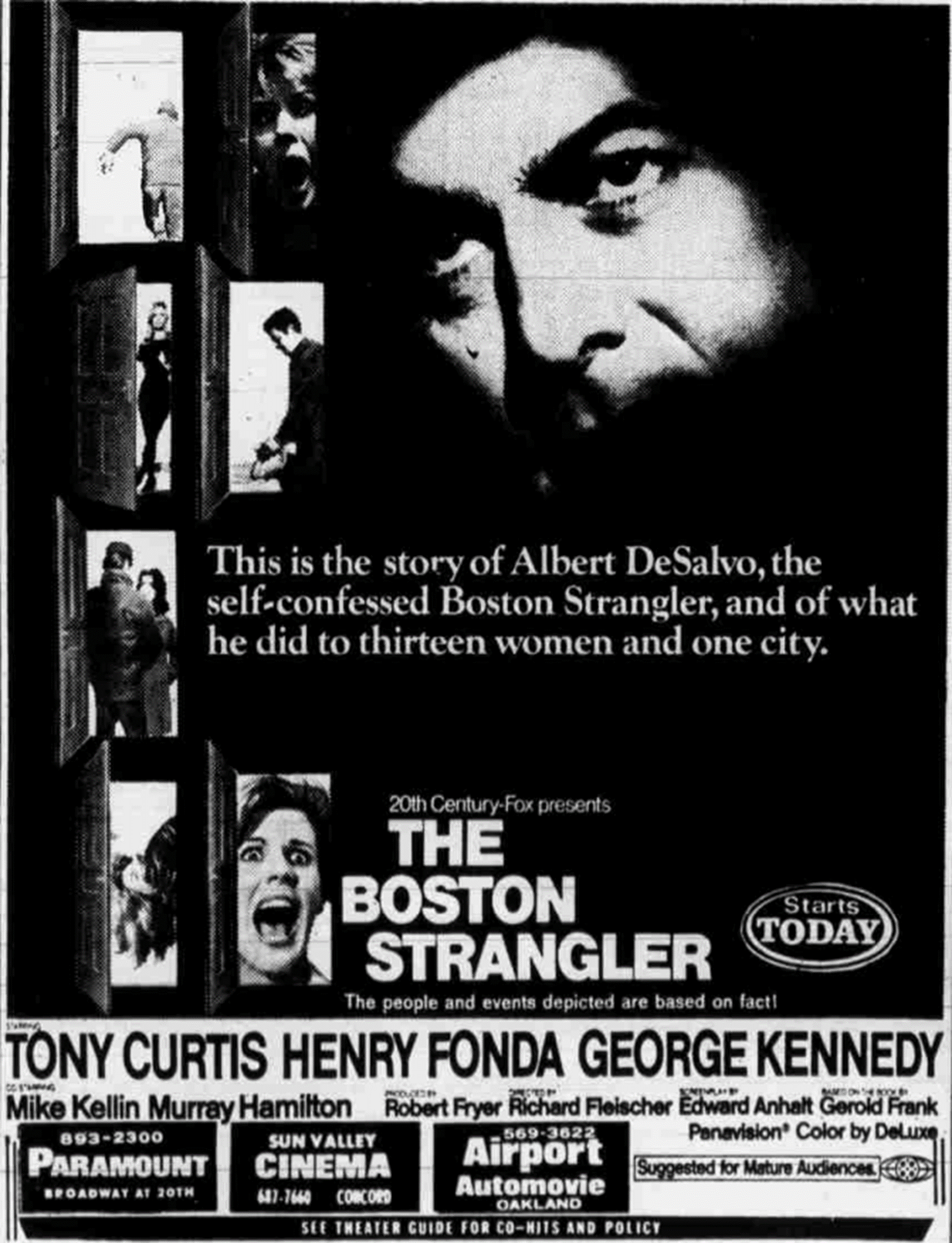
Poster for the 1968 film The Boston Strangler.

- Philadelphia 76ers player Andrew Toney was dubbed "the Boston Strangler" because of his outstanding performances against the Boston Celtics; a notable example is Game 7 of the 1982 Eastern Conference Finals.
- The 1964 film The Strangler was inspired by the unsolved killings.
- William Goldman's 1964 novel No Way to Treat a Lady and its 1968 film adaptation were both inspired by the multiple-killer theories of the Boston Strangler.
- The rock and roll band The Standells referred to the Boston Strangler in their 1965 Boston-themed song "Dirty Water" with the lines "have you heard about the Strangler?" and "I'm the man, I'm the man."
- The 1968 film The Boston Strangler starred Tony Curtis as Albert DeSalvo. Henry Fonda co-starred.
- The Rolling Stones released "Midnight Rambler" on the album Let It Bleed in 1969. The song is a loose biography of Albert DeSalvo; the lyric "Well, you heard about the Boston..." followed by a menacing bass guitar chord, is a reference to the killer.
- The 1995 film Copycat makes reference to the Boston Strangler.
- The 2007 novel The Strangler by William Landay depicts the family of an attorney on the Strangler task force.
- The 2007 novel Strangled by Brian McGrory depicts a Boston newspaper reporter receiving evidence and notes from potentially the same murderer, over 40 years later, and police efforts to suppress the idea that they did not solve the original case.
- A 2008 film The Boston Strangler – The Untold Story stars David Faustino as De Salvo.
- The 2010 television film The Front, starring Andie MacDowell and Daniel Sunjata, depicts a detective who reopens an unsolved 1960s murder of a woman who may have been the first victim of the Boston Strangler. The plot suggests that DeSalvo was not the only perpetrator of these Boston murders.
- The Boston Strangler made an appearance in the episode "Strangler" of CBS's American Gothic, where he was summoned by the antagonist sheriff Lucas Buck to get rid of Merlyn Temple. When Lucas leaves town to attend a convention, Albert De Salvo -aka The Boston Strangler- decides to do more than just try to kill Merlyn.
- The Boston Strangler was featured as a central figure in the second episode of TNT's Rizzoli & Isles, starring Angie Harmon and Sasha Alexander. The episode was called "Boston Strangler Redux", featuring a new serial killer who killed women with the same names as the original Strangler's victims. He is eventually revealed to have been one of the original detectives investigating the case who tried to frame the man whom he believed to be the real Boston Strangler.
- He and the Zodiac Killer are featured in Image comics' The Roberts.
- A waxwork of Albert DeSalvo was featured in an episode of the British comedy series Psychoville. The waxwork comes to life in a fantasy sequence (along with those of John George Haigh, John Christie, and Jack the Ripper), trying to persuade character David Sowerbutts to kill a man by strangling. The others accused him of having several personalities, referencing the 1968 movie.
- In the 13th episode of the second season of Crossing Jordan titled "Strangled", the characters have a Cold Case party where they role play the investigation into two murders that fit the MO of the Boston Strangler.
- A Boston hardcore band is named the Boston Strangler.
- A 2016 podcast titled Stranglers delves into the Boston Strangler investigation and features clips of the DeSalvo confession tapes and interviews with relatives of the key players in the investigation, including chief investigator Phil DiNatale's sons.
- Boston Strangler was a 2023 American film based on the real case, and starred Keira Knightley, Carrie Coon, Alessandro Nivola, Chris Cooper, and David Dastmalchian. The film was shot in the Boston area, and was released in the United States on Hulu in March of 2023.
- The second season opener of Boston Blue features a storyline about a Boston Strangler copycat. The plotline includes the character of Henry Reagan from Blue Bloods and the idea that Henry worked the original Boston Strangler case.

== See also ==
- List of fugitives from justice who disappeared
- List of serial killers in the United States
