= List of Massachusetts state correctional facilities =

This is a list of state correctional facilities in the Commonwealth of Massachusetts. It does not include federal prisons or houses of correction located in Massachusetts (known in other states as county jails). All of the following prisons are under the jurisdiction of the Massachusetts Department of Correction.

Name	Location	Security
Boston Pre-Release Center	Roslindale (Boston)	Minimum/Pre-Release
Bridgewater State Hospital	Bridgewater	Medium
Lemuel Shattuck Hospital Correctional Unit	Boston	Medium
Massachusetts Alcohol and Substance Abuse Center at Plymouth	Plymouth	Minimum
Massachusetts Correctional Institution - Framingham	Framingham	Medium
Massachusetts Correctional Institution - Norfolk	Norfolk	Medium
Massachusetts Correctional Institution - Shirley	Shirley	Medium/Minimum
Massachusetts Treatment Center	Bridgewater	Medium
North Central Correctional Institution	Gardner	Medium/Minimum
Northeastern Correctional Center	West Concord	Minimum/Pre-Release
Old Colony Correctional Center	Bridgewater	Medium
Pondville Correctional Center	Norfolk	Minimum/Pre-Release
South Middlesex Correctional Center	Framingham	Minimum/Pre-Release
Souza-Baranowski Correctional Center	Shirley	Maximum

== Former facilities ==
- Bay State Correctional Center
- Charlestown State Prison
- Massachusetts Correctional Institution - Cedar Junction
- Massachusetts Correctional Institution - Concord
- Massachusetts Correctional Institution - Lancaster
- Massachusetts Correctional Institution - Old Colony Minimum
- Massachusetts Correctional Institution - Shirley Minimum
- Southeastern Correctional Center
- Massachusetts Alcohol and Substance Abuse Center - Bridgewater
