= Massachusetts Correctional Institution – Concord =

Prison in Concord, Massachusetts

Massachusetts Correctional Institution-Concord
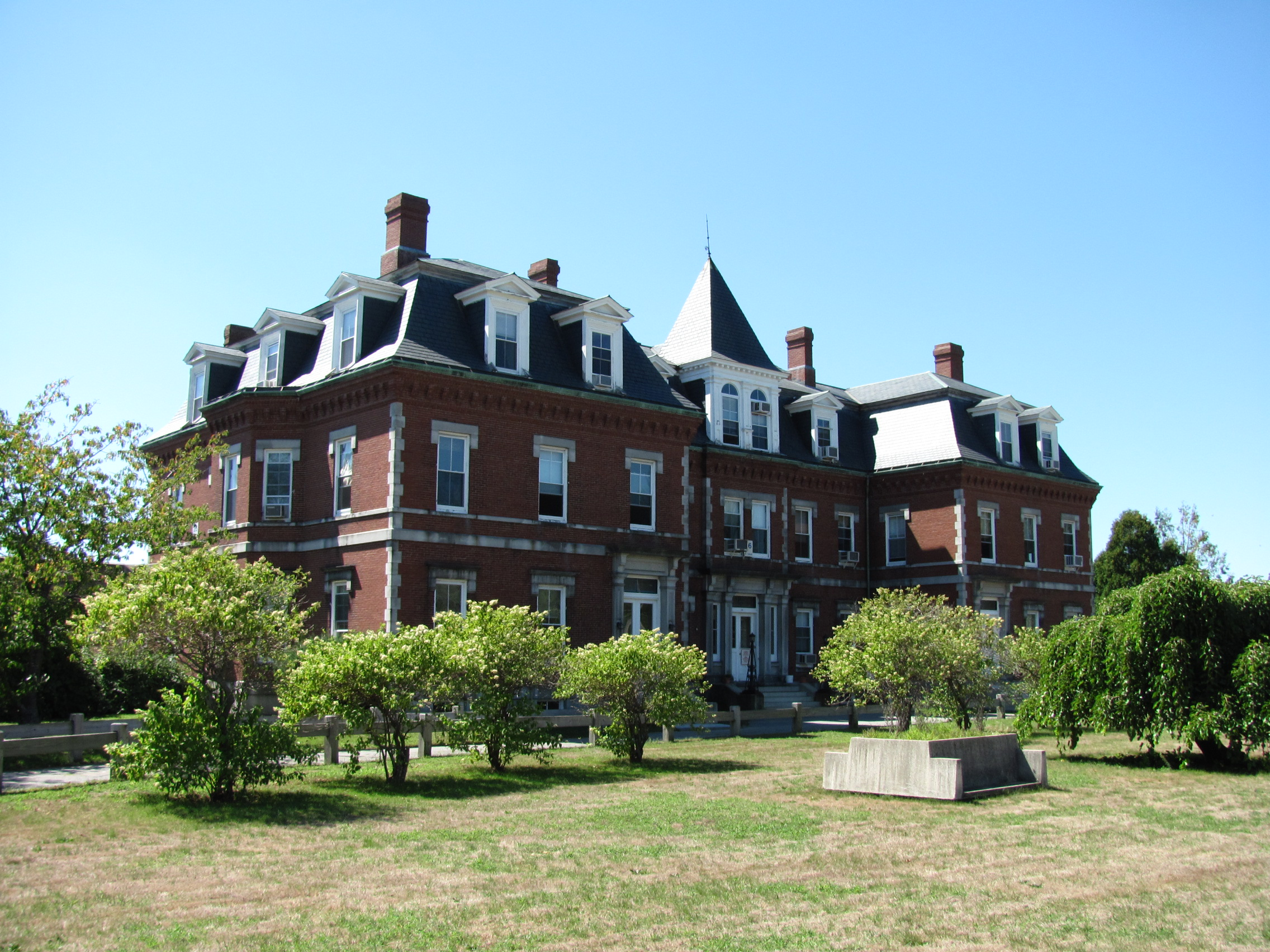
- The Old Concord Reformatory Building at MCI-Concord

- Location in Massachusetts
- Location: Concord, Massachusetts; 42°27′53″N 71°23′44″W
- Status: Closed
- Security class: Medium
- Capacity: Operational Capacity: 752
- Opened: May 1878
- Closed: July 2024
- Managed by: Massachusetts Department of Correction
- Director: Superintendent Dean Gray (before closing)

The Massachusetts Correctional Institution at Concord (MCI-Concord) was a medium security prison for men located in Concord, Massachusetts in the United States. Opened in 1878, it was the oldest running state prison for men in Massachusetts. It was under the jurisdiction of the Massachusetts Department of Correction. The facility had a total capacity of 614 general population beds, but with a long-term decline in the number of men incarcerated for the entire state, the population as of January 2024 had decreased to about 300, which made Governor Maura Healey announce a plan to close the prison in the summer of that year and transfer the remaining prisoners to other facilities.

== Facility ==
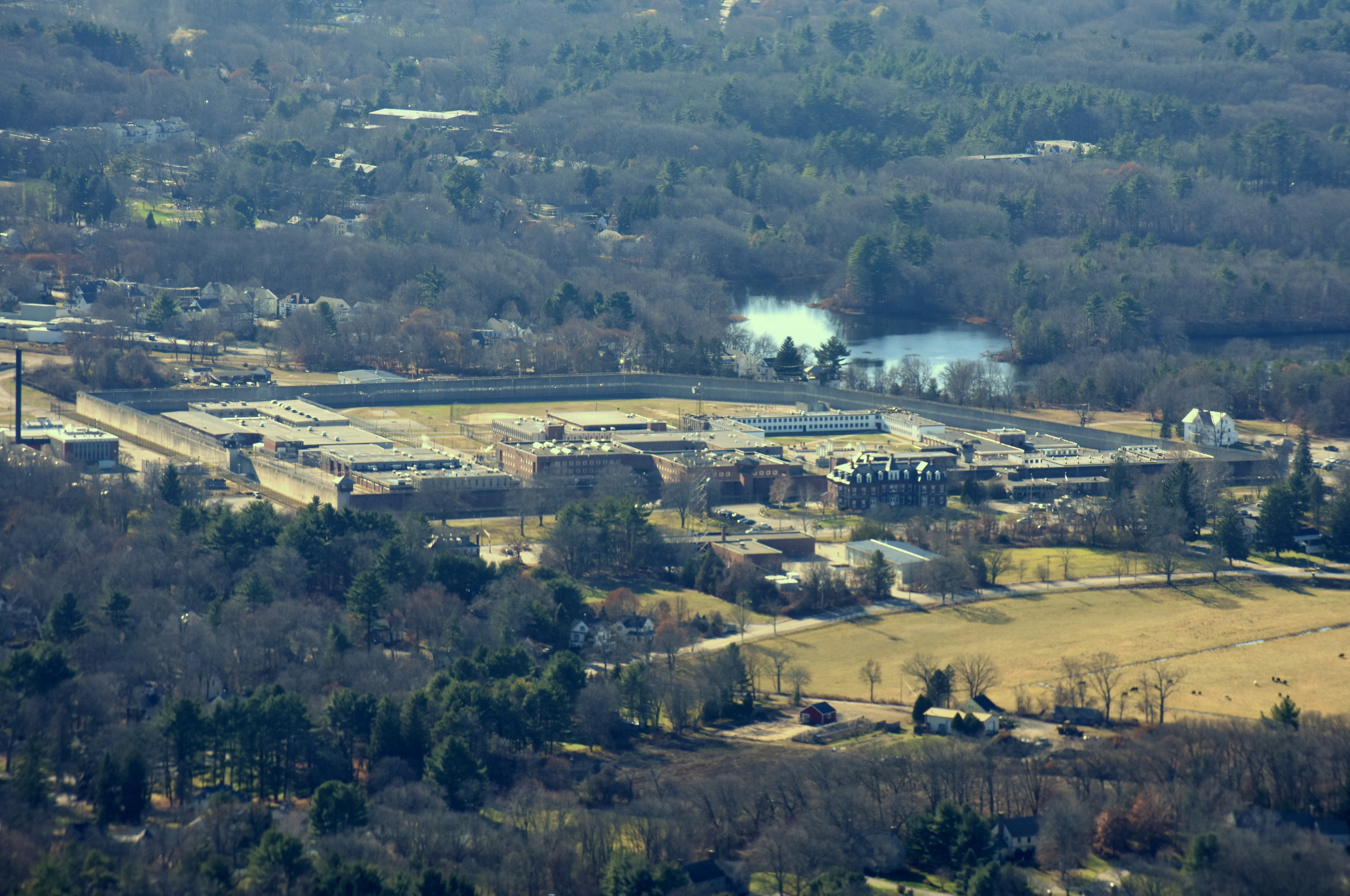
Aerial view of modern compound

MCI Concord was a level 4, medium level security prison. The prison is located in Concord, Massachusetts on state Route 2. A Massachusetts State Police barracks (Troop A-3) and the Northeastern Correctional Center (Minimum Security) are located across the highway from the prison. The prison was designed to house 550-600 medium security inmates, but as of 2024 the population had declined to about 300.

MCI-Concord was also the home to the department's Central Date Computation Unit, Central Records Unit, Central Research Unit, and the Data Collection Unit. All of which were split between the SFU Building outside and B-Building within the walls of the facility.

== History ==
MCI Concord opened in May 1878 as the New State Prison at Concord with Mexican War veteran General Chamberlain as its warden.

In 1884, all the State inmates were taken out of Concord and transferred to the Charlestown State Prison in Charlestown, Massachusetts and Concord became the "Massachusetts Reformatory" where prisoners under 30 years of age received a one number maximum term for the crime they were convicted of and the Massachusetts Parole Board could release the offender a month after their judgment, or anytime up to their maximum term. If the offender proved to be reformed of the behavior that caused his incarceration he would be put on supervised parole which was subject to termination if the parolee proved to be rehabilitated. The courts sentenced those they felt could be reformed to the reformatory, and the more serious offenders to the State prison. Programs were set up at Concord so that the offender could prove himself reformed, and be paroled could learn a trade to be used on their return to society.

In 1893, additional construction added 230 cells to the Massachusetts reformatory. In 1955, because of overcrowding at the State Prison in Charlestown and rioting inmates, Governor Herter formed a committee to study the system and it was decided to revamp the entire State Prison system and the Commissioner was ordered to purchase more prison facilities for those sentenced to the State Prison; to ease the overcrowding situation at Charlestown. During the Acts of 1955, c. 770, all the prisons were merely renamed, "MCI-(at the city or town the prison was located).

In 1955, the state prison at Walpole, and the reformatory at Concord were in fact "two" distinct "maximum" security facilities. In 1972, c. 777, s.8, the Massachusetts reformatory "name" was changed to be, "MCI-Concord." Only the name was changed. Court commitments from District Courts to the reformatory did not stop until the reformatory sentence was repealed in 1994.

Around 1978–80, after a major riot at the reformatory, where the inmates even robbed the prison Canteen Store, during a movie, Dog Day Afternoon held in the Gym (where all the inmates go at one time) over 150 reformatory inmates were transferred to the State Prison, and 150 State inmates were transferred to the reformatory. Then, without Legislative authority, or even notifying the Judicial branch of our tripartite system, Commissioner Hogan abolished the Maximum Security Reformatory for men at MCI-Concord and made it a medium security facility that would also be used as a "reception and diagnostic center" which was at MCI-Norfolk already for offenders sentenced to the Maximum Security State Prison Sentence.

Before 1978-80 Concord had never housed any State sentenced inmates, so the maximum security reformatory facility did their classification in the building designated as the "New Line" where it was decided whether the reformatory inmate would stay at the maximum security reformatory or be moved to the Farm across the street. Since June 2009 MCI-Concord was redesignated as a medium security facility of the State Prison and Massachusetts.

Timothy Leary's Concord Prison Experiment was conducted at MCI Concord during the early 1960s.

=== 1882 riot ===
In early July, 1882 at 12:00 midnight inmates at the Concord Reformatory began to cause a disturbance by shouting and banging on doors. The noise went on for hours and the prison's warden decided to punish the inmates by revoking their yard privileges for July 4. This caused the disturbance to escalate with inmates breaking down wooden doors and furniture being destroyed. The riot stopped three days later.

=== 1959 riot ===
On April 22, 1959, a special riot squad of the Massachusetts State Police put down a mass attempt at escape from the Concord State Reformatory. State Police quelled escape attempt by 59 convicts at Concord Reformatory; rescue 13 guards, 2 civilians held as hostages.

=== 1972 riot ===
On November 22, 1972, inmates in E Building began rioting and causing a major disturbance. Correction officers requested assistance and seventy-five state police officers (along with four sharpshooters) were sent to the Concord Reformatory to put down the uprising.

=== 1976 riot ===
On February 15, 1976, 60 to 80 inmates caused $1 million worth of damage to three buildings during a four hour riot that ended when the inmates voluntarily surrendered.

=== COVID-19 ===
Pursuant to the Supreme Judicial Court’s April 3, 2020 Opinion and Order in the Committee for Public Counsel Services v. Chief Justice of the Trial Court, SJC-12926 matter, as amended on April 10, April 28 and June 23, 2020 (the “Order”), the Special Master posted weekly reports for COVID-19 testing and cases for each of the correctional facilities administered by the Department of Correction and each of the county Sheriffs’ offices. Prisoner and staff vaccinations started in the spring of 2021. Weekly reported was stopped in the summer of 2021 and the website terminated. There had been 296 prisoners testing positive and two deaths at MCI-Concord before reporting ended.

=== Closure ===
On January 24, 2024, Governor Healey announced that the state Department of Corrections planned to close the prison by summertime, citing a decline in the statewide prison population and an effort to curb state spending in the face of declining tax revenues. The facility officially closed on July 17, 2024.

== Notable inmates ==
- Malcolm X was an inmate at the Concord Reformatory (now MCI-Concord) for 15 months in 1947 and 1948.
- John Geoghan, a figure in the Roman Catholic sex abuse cases, was in protective custody at the institution. He was later murdered in another correctional facility.
- Leeland Eisenberg: the man who held Hillary Clinton's campaign workers hostage in December 2007: sentenced on September 11, 1987 to 11–20 years at MCI-Concord for rape until his release in March 2005.
- Cameron Lacroix, the teen hacker best known for compromising the personal account of a T-Mobile Sidekick belonging to Paris Hilton.
- Joseph Barboza, mob hitman for the Patriarca crime family of New England during the 1960s

== See also ==
- List of Massachusetts state correctional facilities
- Concord Prison Outreach

== Sources ==
1. Senate Doc. No. 750, pg. 148, s. 98-254,285,286,289. (proposed changes to revamp entire Judicial and Executive branches)
2. 1955 House No. 3034, (authorizes additional State Prison Camps to ease overcrowding at Charlestown State Prison 1955).
3. George F. McGrath, 1955 Ann.Survet, Criminal Law and Procedure, s.12.1,2, pg 121-124. (Reviewing changes at Concord in after St.1955)
4. Conlon In re 19 NE 164, 148 Mass 168 (1889), (Review of Reformatory)
5. Sheehan v Superintendent of Concord reformatory, 150 NE 231, 254 Mass 342 (1926), (transfer from boys school to reformatory, "constitutional.")
6. Brown v Comm. of Corr. 474 NE2d 1059, (1985), (Commissioner cannot transfer reformatory inmate to State prison, "unconstitutional.")
7. Unsoeld v unsoeld, 104 NE 462, (1914) (reformatory sentence was not a "State" prison sentence).
8. Platt v Commonwealth, 256 mass 695,697 (1926) (Legislative intent of Reformatory).
9. Peter Rockholz, consultant for Connecticut Criminal Justice Institution, 2002, quotes guards, "Inmates sentenced to the State Prison are here to be controlled and just to have the basics- to be punished" then released.
