= Middlesex House of Correction =

Middlesex House of Correction may refer to one of several institutions:

== Middlesex, England ==
- Tothill Fields Bridewell
- Coldbath Fields Prison, London. Also known as the Middlesex House of Correction and Clerkenwell Gaol
- Middlesex House of Correction (Westminster, London), a former 19th century female prison, now the site of Westminster Cathedral

== Middlesex, Massachusetts, United States ==
- Middlesex Jail and House of Correction, overseen by the Middlesex County Sheriff's Office
- South Middlesex Correctional Center, a small, minimum security/pre-release state prison for women located in Framingham, Massachusetts
