= Bay State Correctional Center =

Former prison in Massachusetts, United States

- Location in Massachusetts
- Location: Norfolk, Massachusetts; 42°07′03″N 71°18′00″W
- Status: Closed
- Security class: Medium
- Capacity: 266 (Housed 314); Overcrowding rate: 123%
- Opened: 1977
- Closed: currently open
- Managed by: Massachusetts Department of Correction
- Director: Superintendent Donald Levesque

Bay State Correctional Center (BSCC) was a small, general population medium security facility that stood on the grounds of the original dormitory buildings of Massachusetts Correctional Institution – Norfolk. It housed both long and short term inmates and many inmates who were elderly because the entire facility was handicapped accessible. The facility was officially opened in 1977, to combat prison overcrowding rates, with an original capacity of 72 inmates. BSCC was under the jurisdiction of the Massachusetts Department of Correction.

As of April 2015, the state moved forward with plans to move inmates out and close the facility to save money. As of December 2015, the facility was officially closed.
