= Massachusetts Correctional Institution - Lancaster =

Minimum security prison for men

Coordinates: 42°26′34″N 71°39′32″W

Massachusetts Correctional Institution-Lancaster
- Interactive map of Massachusetts Correctional Institution-Lancaster
- Location: Lancaster, Massachusetts
- Status: Defunct
- Security class: Minimum
- Managed by: Massachusetts Department of Correction

The Massachusetts Correctional Institution at Lancaster (MCI-Lancaster) was a minimum security prison for men located in Lancaster, Massachusetts in the United States on the site of the former Lancaster Industrial School for Girls. When operational, the prison was under the jurisdiction of the Massachusetts Department of Correction.

== See also ==
- List of Massachusetts state correctional facilities
