= List of Massachusetts County House of Correction facilities =

This is a list of County Correctional facilities in the Commonwealth of Massachusetts. It does not include federal prisons or state prisons located in Massachusetts. Each of the following houses of correction and jails are under the jurisdiction of the Sheriff of that county.

Name	Location
Barnstable County Correctional Facility	Bourne
Berkshire County Jail and House of Correction	Pittsfield
Bristol County House Of Correction and Jail	North Dartmouth
Dukes County Jail and House of Correction	Edgartown
Essex County Correctional Facility	Middleton
Franklin County Jail and House of Correction	Greenfield
Hampden County Jail and House of Correction	Ludlow
Hampshire County Jail and House of Correction	Northampton
Middlesex Jail and House of Correction	Billerica
Nantucket County Jail	Nantucket
Nashua Street Jail (Suffolk County)	Boston
Norfolk County Correctional Center	Dedham
Plymouth County Correctional Facility	Plymouth
South Bay House of Correction (Suffolk County)	Boston
Worcester County Jail and House of Correction	West Boylston
