= Lemuel Shattuck Hospital =

State hospital in Massachusetts

- Massachusetts Department of Public Health
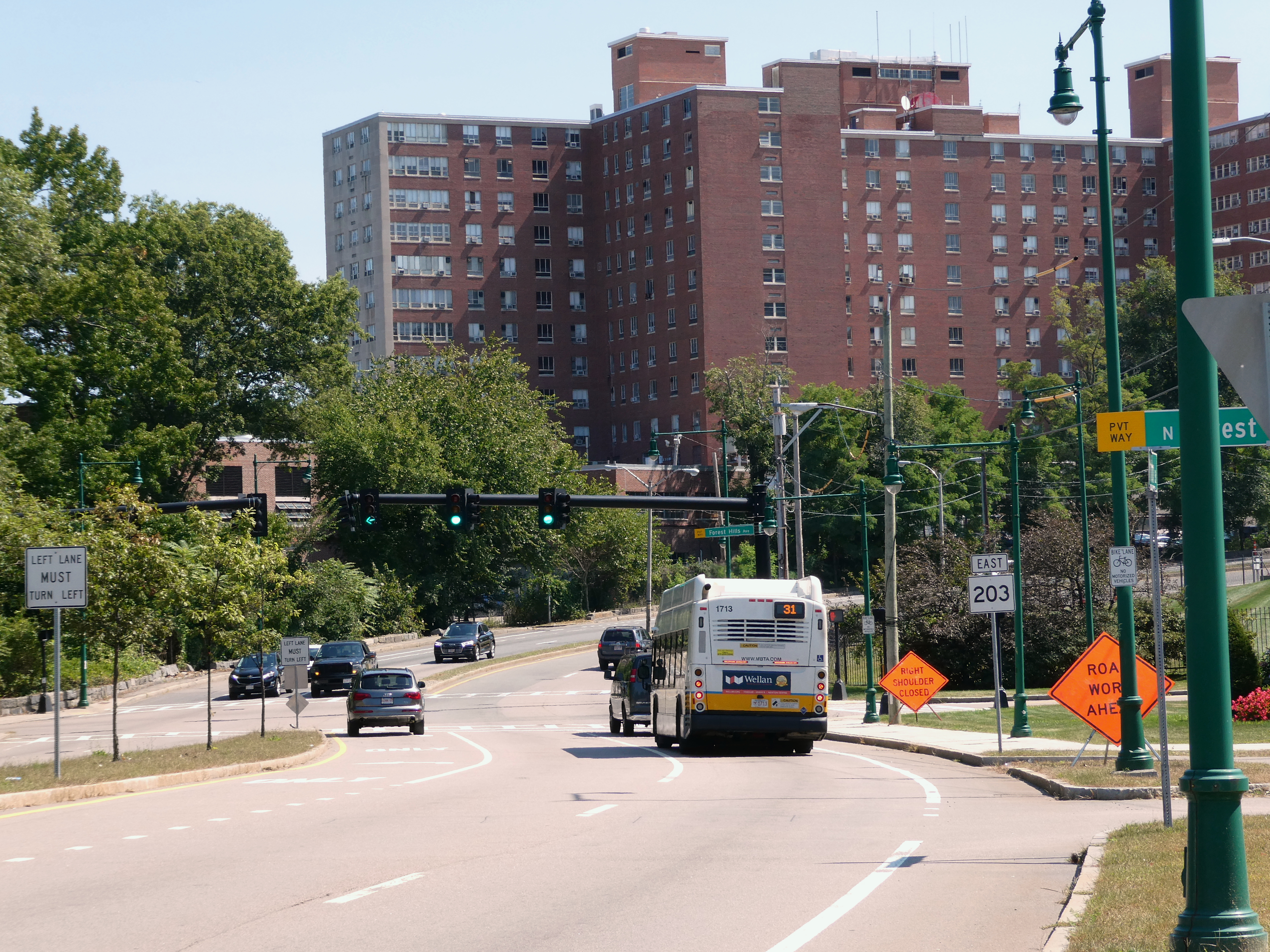
- Lemuel Shattuck Hospital in 2024

Geography
- Location: Jamaica Plain, Boston, Massachusetts, United States

Organization
- Type: Teaching
- Affiliated university: Tufts University School of Medicine
- Network: Boston Medical Center

Services
- Standards: Joint Commission
- Emergency department: No
- Beds: 255 (2024)

Helipads
Number	Length		Surface
Number	ft	m	Surface
			Orange Line; Bus 16, 21, 31; Franklin/Foxboro; Needham Line; Providence/Stoughton Line

Links
- Website: www.mass.gov/locations/lemuel-shattuck-hospital
- Lists: Hospitals in Massachusetts
- Other links: Lemuel Shattuck Hospital Correctional Unit

Lemuel Shattuck Hospital (commonly shortened as Shattuck Hospital) is a 255-bed public health and teaching hospital located in the Jamaica Plain neighborhood of Boston, Massachusetts. The hospital is owned and operated by the Massachusetts Department of Public Health (DPH), and as an affiliate of the Tufts University School of Medicine, serves as the only teaching hospital operated by DPH.

Shattuck Hospital offers inpatient care, including that of inmates through its correctional unit, as well as outpatient and social services.

The hospital was named after Lemuel Shattuck, a local politician, statistician and historian recognized for his part in developing the plan that would lead to the 1869 creation of the nation's first Board of Health in Massachusetts.

== Services ==
Shattuck offers outpatient care, surgical services, outpatient clinics, radiological imaging, and laboratory services. The hospital maintains several governmental and academic relationships, such as with the Massachusetts Department of Mental Health, Massachusetts Department of Correction, and Tufts University School of Medicine.

The hospital plans to relocate its services to the Newton Pavilion in Boston's South End in 2024.
