= Massachusetts Correctional Institution – Cedar Junction =

Prison in Massachusetts

Massachusetts Correctional Institution—Cedar Junction
- Interactive map of Massachusetts Correctional Institution—Cedar Junction
- Location: Walpole / Norfolk, Massachusetts (South Walpole postal address, ZIP code 02071); 42°6′20.1″N 71°17′23.9″W
- Status: Closed
- Security class: Level 6 (Maximum)
- Capacity: Max. Capacity: 568: Operational Occupancy, Max: 61% (as of January 2020); Operational Capacity, Medium: 78% (as of January 2020); Operational Occupancy, Medium: 83% (as of January 2020)
- Opened: 1955
- Closed: 2024
- Managed by: Massachusetts Department of Correction
- Director: Superintendent Douglas DeMoura

The Massachusetts Correctional Institution—Cedar Junction (MCI-Cedar Junction), formerly known as MCI-Walpole, was a men's maximum security prison under the jurisdiction of the Massachusetts Department of Correction. It was opened in 1956 to replace Charlestown State Prison, the oldest prison in the nation at that time. MCI-Cedar Junction is one of two (the other one being Souza-Baranowski Correctional Center) maximum security prisons for male offenders in the Commonwealth of Massachusetts. As of January 6, 2020, there was 346 Maximum and 65 Medium inmates in general population beds. The MADOC announced on June 21, 2023 that they concluded housing operations at MCI-Cedar Junction.

MCI-Cedar Junction also housed the Departmental Disciplinary Unit (DDU). During the 1970s, Cedar Junction (then known as Walpole) was one of the most violent prisons in the United States. It is located on both sides of the line between the towns of Walpole and Norfolk, and has a South Walpole mailing address (South Walpole is not a political entity).

In 1955, Richard Cardinal Cushing, Archbishop of Boston, built Our Lady of the Ransom Chapel at the center of the prison. As of June 2009, MCI-Cedar Junction serves as the reception and diagnostic center, which receives all new male court commitments for the Commonwealth of Massachusetts' Department of Correction.

== Uprising ==
In 1973, after the Attica Prison riot, a branch of the National Prisoner Reform Association (NPRA) was established. The NPRA, which became the prisoners' legitimate representative, organized committees which ran the prison for three months, monitored by neutral civilian observers and other volunteers from local communities. During that time the murder rate in Walpole fell from the highest in the country to zero. The strike ended in the prisoners' favor as the superintendent of the prison resigned. The prisoners were granted more visitation rights and work programs.

== Notable inmates ==
- Tony Costa - Serial killer believed to have brutally murdered and dismembered four women (possibly more than nine). He died by suicide by hanging in his cell on May 12, 1974.
- Wayne Lo - Perpetrator of the 1992 Bard College at Simon's Rock shooting.
- Albert DeSalvo - Serial rapist widely believed to be the Boston Strangler. He was stabbed to death by an inmate in 1973.
- John Salvi - Abortion opponent who killed two and wounded five at abortion clinics in Brookline, Massachusetts. He died by suicide by asphyxiation on November 29, 1996.
- Billy Tibbetts - Former NHL player convicted of rape in 1994.

== In popular culture ==
The prison was featured in the 2010 crime film The Town.

In Ray Donovan TV series, the main character's menacing father Mickey Donovan (Jon Voight) spent 20 years in 'Walpole' prison, before he was released in 2013.

In the 2020 film, Spenser Confidential, the film's titular protagonist was sent to "Walpole" for 5 years after pleading guilty to harassment and assault on his Boston Police commanding officer John Boylan, who is revealed to be a dirty cop involved in a drug conspiracy.

On Jimmy Kimmel Live! on Saint Patrick's Day 2026 (March 17), Kimmel had a bit where he featured a drunk man from Brockton saying his parents were "in the slammer – ever heard of it? It's in Walpole."

In the Film, 'Hot Summer Nights' (2017), Timothee Chalamet's character says, "I don't know about you, but I don't want to end up in Walpole getting &$%# $@#$% in the showers" at 29:50. He had just run into a police officer and is concerned because he is selling marijuana on Cape Cod.

== Closure ==
As of April 2022, Cedar Junction is planned to be shut down within the next two years due to reduced incarceration rates (currently the lowest in 35 years) and the high costs of maintenance. The Massachusetts Department of Correction (DOC) estimates the cost to repair the infrastructure of Cedar Junction at $30 million; the DOC plans to move the money towards delivering effective care and services for the people under their supervision. The process of closing the prison is split into three main phases. First phase plans to start around the summer of 2022, moving any newly sentenced men to the Souza-Baranowski Correctional Center, a maximum security prison located in Lancaster, Massachusetts. In the second phase, prisoners in the Behavioral Management unit will be moved to other facilities. Lastly, in the third phase, the Department Disciplinary Unit is set to be dissolved around 2024. The removal of the Disciplinary Unit is an attempt by the DOC to reform their approaches to discipline.

As of June 2023, the prison has been closed, as part of a program to decarcerate criminals in Massachusetts.
