= Alton Desnoyer =

American politician

Member of the New Hampshire House of Representatives from the Sullivan 4th district
- In office 1974–1978

Personal details
- Born: February 22, 1905
- Died: June 24, 1982 (aged 77)
- Party: Democratic

Alton Desnoyer (February 22, 1905 – June 24, 1982) was an American politician. He served as a Democratic member for the Sullivan 4th district of the New Hampshire House of Representatives.

== Life and career ==
Desnoyer was born February 22, 1905, in Bridgewater, Massachusetts, to Adelor and Millie Desnoyer.

Desnoyer owned and operated a variety store, was a Claremont city councilor, the Claremont postmaster from 1963 to 1973 and was the mayor of Claremont. He served in the United States Air Force in World War II.

Desnoyer served in the New Hampshire House of Representatives from 1974 to 1978.

Desnoyer died June 24, 1982, in hospital at the age of 77 and was survived by his wife and daughter.
