= Paul Shanley =

Laicized American priest (1931–2020)

Paul Richard Shanley
- Born: January 25, 1931; Boston, Massachusetts, U.S.
- Died: October 28, 2020 (aged 89); Ware, Massachusetts, U.S.
- Occupation: Roman Catholic priest
- Known for: Boston clergy sex abuse scandal
- Criminal charges: Indecent assault and child rape
- Criminal penalty: 12 to 15 years in prison (served 12)

Ecclesiastical career
- Church: Roman Catholic Church
- Laicized: 2004

Paul Richard Shanley (January 25, 1931 – October 28, 2020) was an American Roman Catholic priest who became the center of a massive sexual abuse scandal in the Archdiocese of Boston in Massachusetts. Beginning in 1967, the archdiocese covered up numerous allegations of child sexual assault against Shanley and facilitated his transfers to other states.

Shanley was convicted of child rape and removed from the priesthood in 2004. Shanley appealed his conviction in 2007 based on questions about the validity of repressed memories, but his conviction was upheld. Shanley was incarcerated from 2005 until his release from state prison in 2017. He died in 2020.

== Biography ==
=== Early life ===
Paul Shanley was born on January 25, 1931, in Boston, Massachusetts. His father owned a bowling alley and pool room and his mother worked as a legal secretary. Shanley attended Huntington School for Boys, working in the summer as a camp counselor. Shanley would later claim that he was sexually abused by a priest when he was 12 years old. After graduating from high school in 1950, Shanley entered Boston University. However, after two years, he entered St. John's Seminary in Boston to study for the priesthood.

=== Priesthood ===
==== 1960s ====
Shanley was ordained a priest for the Archdiocese of Boston in 1960. After his ordination, Shanley was assigned as an assistant pastor at St. Patrick's Parish in Stoneham, Massachusetts. The next year, a parent in Stoneham complained to the police that Shanley had sexually abused his 11-year-old son. The police were ready to prosecute Shanley, but the father backed off. The mother wrote a complaint letter to Cardinal Richard Cushing, the archbishop, but heard nothing back. There were other complaints about Shanley in Stoneham.

In 1967, a priest at the National Shrine of Our Lady of La Salette in Attleboro, Massachusetts wrote a complaint letter to the archdiocese about Shanley. The priest relayed allegations from two boys that Shanley sexually abused them during a weekend visit to a cabin in the Blue Hills.

In 1969, Shanley started his Youth Apostolate in the Roxbury section of Boston, ministering to people suffering from drug addiction and young runaways struggling with their sexuality. He gained "the nickname the hippie priest for his long hair and outspoken views, including his public rejection of the church's condemnation of homosexuality." Shanley's writings included Changing Norms of Sexuality. His work with youth inspired three nuns to start a similar social agency in Boston.

==== 1970s and 1980s ====
According to a woman who attended a 1977 church meeting in Rochester, New York, Shanley gave a speech in which he said that when an adult and a child have sex, 'the adult is not the seducer—the ‘kid’ is the seducer and further the kid is not traumatized by the act per se, the kid is traumatized when the police and authorities ‘drag’ the kid in for questioning". The woman sent her notes to the Archdiocese of Boston.

In 1979, Shanley attended a conference in Boston on sexuality as a representative of the archdiocese. The February 12, 1979 issue of Gaysweek stated that several attendees later decided to form the North American Man-Boy Love Association (NAMBLA). Shanley was not involved, however Lawyer Roderick MacLeish and Shanley's accuser, Paul Busa, later incorrectly stated that Shanely was a "founding member of NAMBLA" in lawsuit and during his trial.

During the 1980s, Shanley served as pastor for several years at St. Jean the Evangelist Parish in Newton, Massachusetts.

==== 1990s ====
In 1990, the archdiocese arranged for Shanley to minister temporarily in the Diocese of San Bernardino in Southern California. While working in California, Shanley was to be on paid sick leave from the archdiocese. Bishop Robert J. Banks wrote a letter in January 1990 to the bishop of San Bernardino stating that Shanley had a clean record. Shanley also signed an affidavit for the Diocese of San Bernardino saying that he did not have any allegations of wrongdoing in Massachusetts.

Shanley was assigned to assist the pastor at St. Anne's Parish in San Bernardino, California. While posted at St. Anne's, Shanley and Reverend John J. White opened a small bed and breakfast property in Palm Springs, California. In October 1993, the Diocese of San Bernardino received a letter from Reverend John B. McCormack, a deputy of Cardinal Law, that said the archdiocese had received records of past child sexual abuse allegations against Shanley. The Diocese of San Bernardino suspended Shanley immediately.

The archdiocese in late 1993 sent Shanley to the Institute of Living, a psychiatric facility in Hartford, Connecticut, for evaluation. While at the institute, they diagnosed Shanley as being 'narcissistic' and 'histrionic'. According to The Boston Globe, Shanley 'admitted to substantial complaints", with his records citing "admissions to nine sexual encounters, four involving boys". According to Wypijewski, the precise statement in the record was: "substance of complaints—sexual activity w/4 adolescent males and w/men and women".

Shanley moved to New York City in 1995 to serve as assistant director of Leo House, a Catholic residence facility in Manhattan. In 1997, Cardinal John O'Connor of the Archdiocese of New York was considering Shanley's promotion to director. However, Cardinal Law dissuaded him from doing it, citing potential embarrassment to the church from Shanley's past.

=== Conviction and appeal ===
In May 2002, Shanley was arrested in San Diego, California, on three counts of child rape from Massachusetts. The allegations dated to when he was a pastor at St. Jean's. The victim had filed charges against Shanley only a few days earlier, saying the attacks occurred for several years between ages six and 15.

In February 2005, Shanley was convicted in Massachusetts of indecent assaults and statutory rape; he received a sentence of 12 to 15 years in state prison. Shanley was laicized in 2004.

The Shanley case was based on recovered memories of abuse that happened 20 years earlier when the plaintiff was a young child. The validity of recovered memory and the alleged prejudice against Shanley due to heavy media coverage formed the basis for his legal appeal.

In 2007, Shanley's new attorney, Robert F. Shaw Jr., filed a motion for a new trial, challenging his convictions as unjust. During a May 2008 hearing, Shaw argued that repressed memories of childhood rape and sexual assault by family and clergy were without general acceptance in the scientific community and were so-called "junk science". Shaw claimed that the court had not received accurate information about the scientific status of repressed memories before Shanley's trial.

On November 26, 2008, Superior Court Judge Stephen Neel denied Shaw's motion for a new trial. Shaw then filed a petition for review in the Supreme Judicial Court of Massachusetts, arguing that Neel had erred, and that "repressed memory" is an unproven, hypothesized phenomenon that has not been accepted in the scientific community and should not be admitted as evidence in Massachusetts courts. In January 2009, the Supreme Judicial Court granted the petition and ordered the case transferred from the intermediate appellate court for review by the state's highest court.

On September 10, 2009, the Supreme Judicial Court heard arguments in the Shanley case. Shaw argued that Shanley was prosecuted, convicted and imprisoned based upon inadmissible evidence. The case was closely watched throughout the United States and abroad. On January 10, 2010, the Supreme Judicial Court unanimously affirmed Shanley's conviction. It concluded:

"In sum, the judge's finding that the lack of scientific testing did not make unreliable the theory that an individual may experience dissociative amnesia was supported in the record, not only by expert testimony but by a wide collection of clinical observations and a survey of academic literature. ... There was no abuse of discretion in the admission of expert testimony on the subject of dissociative amnesia."

=== Prison release and death ===
Shanley was released on parole from Old Colony Correctional Center in Bridgewater, Massachusetts, on July 28, 2017, after serving 12 years. His sentence required him to be on supervised probation until 2027.

Paul Shanley died of heart failure in Ware, Massachusetts, on October 28, 2020, at age 89.

== See also ==
- Roman Catholic sex abuse cases
- Roman Catholic priests accused of sex offenses
- Crimen sollicitationis
