= Concord Prison Experiment =

1961–1963 study of psychoactive drug

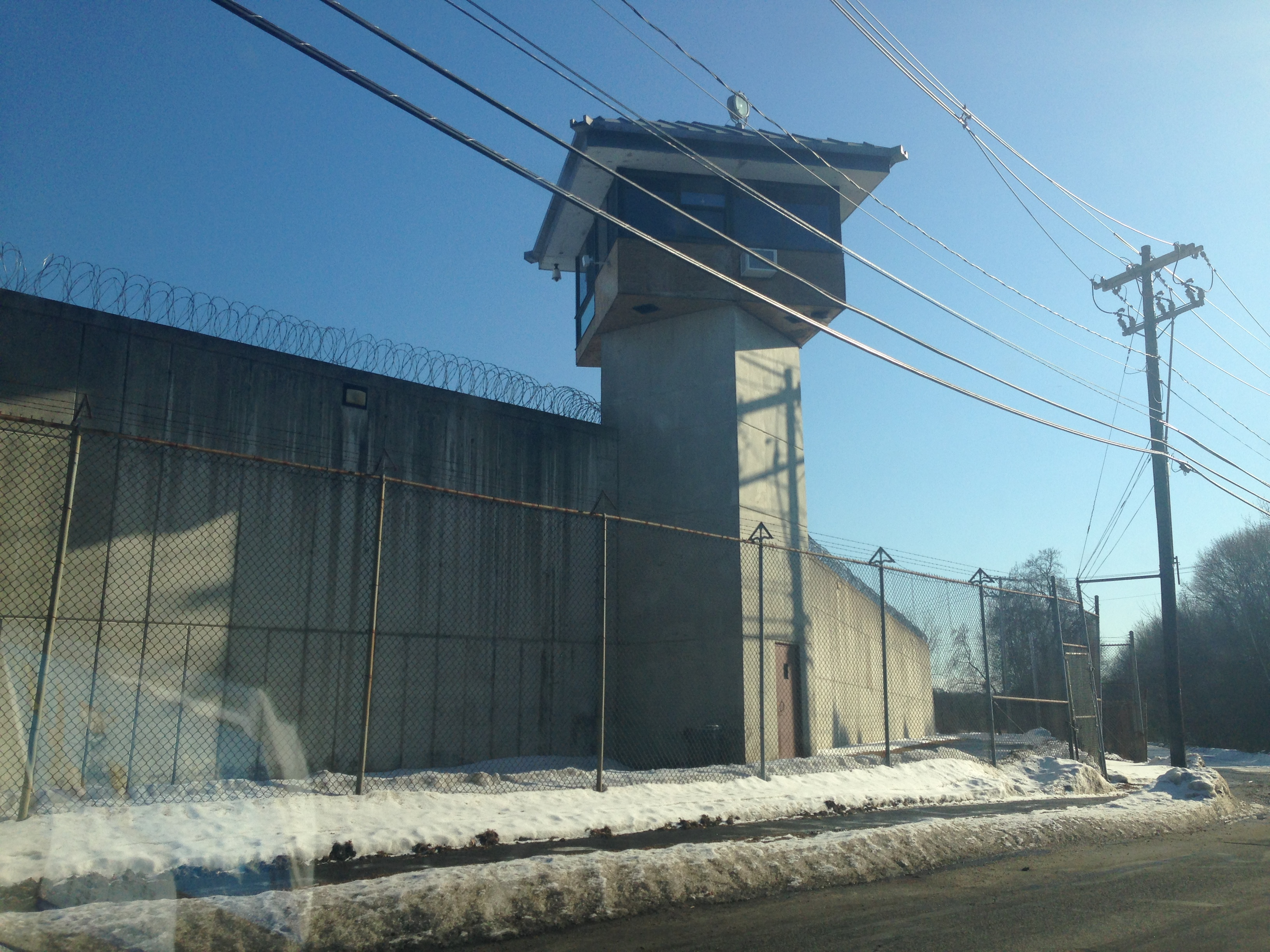
Concord Prison

The Concord Prison Experiment, conducted from 1961 to 1963, was designed to evaluate whether the experiences produced by the psychoactive drug psilocybin, derived from psilocybin mushrooms, combined with psychotherapy, could inspire prisoners to leave their antisocial lifestyles behind once they were released. The efficacy was to be judged by comparing the recidivism rate of subjects who received psilocybin with the average for other Concord inmates.

== Staff ==
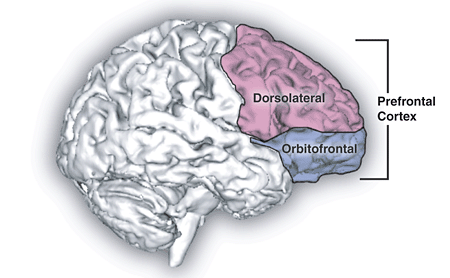
Psilocybin acts on the prefrontal cortex of the brain (pictured), a region associated with the personality and with "orchestration of thoughts and actions in accordance with internal goals."

The experiment was conducted between February 1961 and January 1963 in Concord State Prison, a maximum-security prison for young offenders, in Concord, Massachusetts by a team of Harvard University researchers. The team were under the direction of Timothy Leary and included Michael Hollingshead, Allan Cohen, Alfred Alschuder, George Litwin, Ralph Metzner, Gunther Weil, and Ralph Schwitzgebel, with Madison Presnell as the medical and psychiatric adviser. The original study involved the administration of psilocybin manufactured by Sandoz Pharmaceuticals to assist group psychotherapy for 32 prisoners in an effort to reduce recidivism rates. The researchers would administer psilocybin to themselves along with the prisoners, on the grounds of "[creating] a sense of equality and shared experience, and to dispel the fear that often accompanies relationships between [experimenters] and [subjects]".

== Results ==
Records at Concord State Prison suggested that 69% of the 32 subjects would return to prison within six months of parole. However, after six months, only 8 (25%) of those on parole had returned, six for technical parole violations and two for new offenses. Few short-term projects with prisoners have been effective to even a minor degree.

In addition, a selection of personality tests were administered to the prisoners both before and after the psilocybin experiences, consisting of the Minnesota Multiphasic Personality Inventory, the California Psychological Inventory, the Maher Sentence Completion Test (designed to measure cynicism in prisoners), and a Thematic Apperception Test (constructed to measure motives). The personality test scores indicated a measurable positive change when pre-psilocybin and post-psilocybin results were compared.

== Follow-up study ==
The results of this experiment have been largely contested by a long-term follow-up study conducted by Rick Doblin, citing several problems including differences in the length of time after release that the study group versus the control group were compared, and other methodology factors including the difference between subjects re-incarcerated for parole violations versus being imprisoned for new crimes. This study concluded that only a statistically slight improvement could be shown (as opposed to the radical improvement originally reported). In his interview within the study, Leary expressed that the major lesson of the Concord Prison experiment was that the key to a long-term reduction in overall recidivism rates might be the combination of the prerelease administration of psilocybin-assisted group psychotherapy with a comprehensive post-release follow-up program modeled on Alcoholics Anonymous groups to offer support to the released prisoners. The study concluded that whether a new program of psilocybin-assisted group psychotherapy and post-release programs would significantly reduce recidivism rates is an empirical question that deserves to be addressed within the context of a new experiment.

== Related research ==
A study by led by Dr. Peter Hendricks at the University of Alabama at Birmingham collected data on 25,622 individuals under community corrections supervision in Treatment Accountability for Safer Communities and found that hallucinogen use predicted a reduced likelihood to fail the TASC program. Results suggested that hallucinogens may promote alcohol and other drug abstinence and prosocial behavior in a population with high rates of recidivism.

== See also ==
- Concord Prison Outreach
- Marsh Chapel Experiment
- Psychedelic therapy
