= Lemuel Shattuck =

American politician

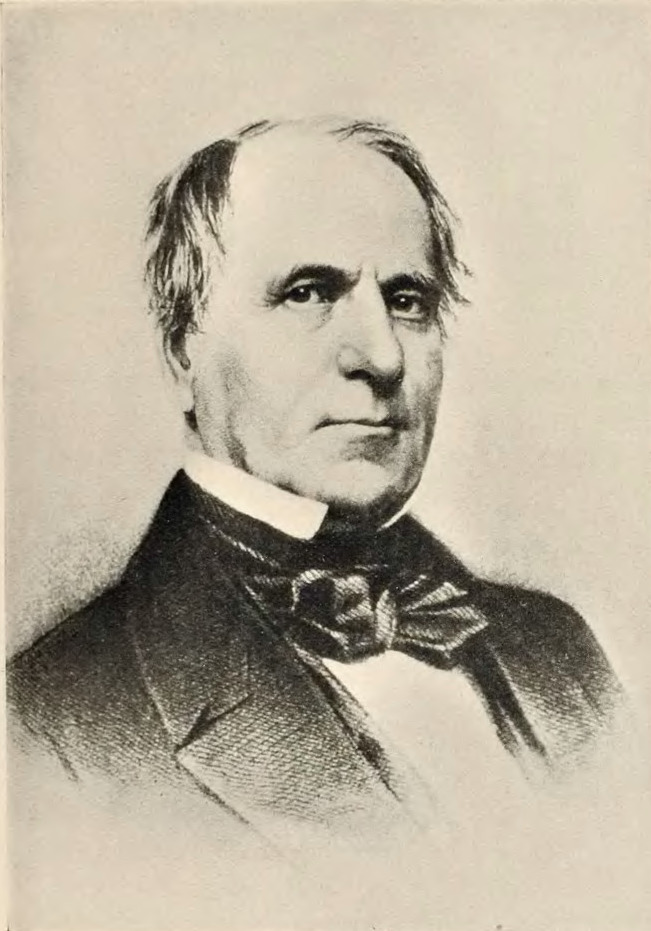
- Born: 15 October 1793
- Died: 17 January 1859
- Occupation: Statistician
- Father: John Shattuck

Lemuel Shattuck (15 October 1793, in Ashby, Massachusetts – 17 January 1859, in Boston, Massachusetts) was an American educator, politician, historian, bookseller, and publisher. He is best known for promoting statistical studies of populations, including setting up a system in Massachusetts that became a model, and planning the interview schedules for the federal Census of 1850.

== Biography ==
Shattuck taught at Troy and Albany, and from 1818 to 1821, he was at the frontier outpost of Detroit, where he taught at a Lancasterian school affiliated with the Catholepistemiad, which later became known as the University of Michigan.

Shattuck became a merchant as a bookseller and publisher in Concord, Massachusetts, in 1823 and was elected as a member of the American Antiquarian Society in 1831. He was a member of the Boston Common Council and served for several years as a representative in the Massachusetts House of Representatives. In 1844, he co-founded the New England Historic Genealogical Society, serving as its vice president for five years. He was also a member of various similar societies.

At the age of 46, Shattuck retired from business to devote himself to his other interests. His research for his 1835 book on Concord history pointed up to him the neglect of vital records. This was one of his motivations for joining others to found the American Statistical Association in 1839. He also promoted legislation that required a better system for the registration of vital information. This law was passed in 1842. His work on a Boston census in 1845 resulted in him being summoned as a consultant for the 1850 United States census. He helped convince Congress to fund a much more complex census, and he designed most of the interview form used by door-to-door canvassers.

His Report on the Sanitary Condition of Massachusetts in 1850 on a sanitary survey of Massachusetts was as amazingly farsighted. It explained how to remove the giant mounds of dirt and dung that were accumulating in fast growing cities, and inspired reforms in many states.

In 1825, he married Clarissa Baxter, and he was survived by three children.

== Recognition ==
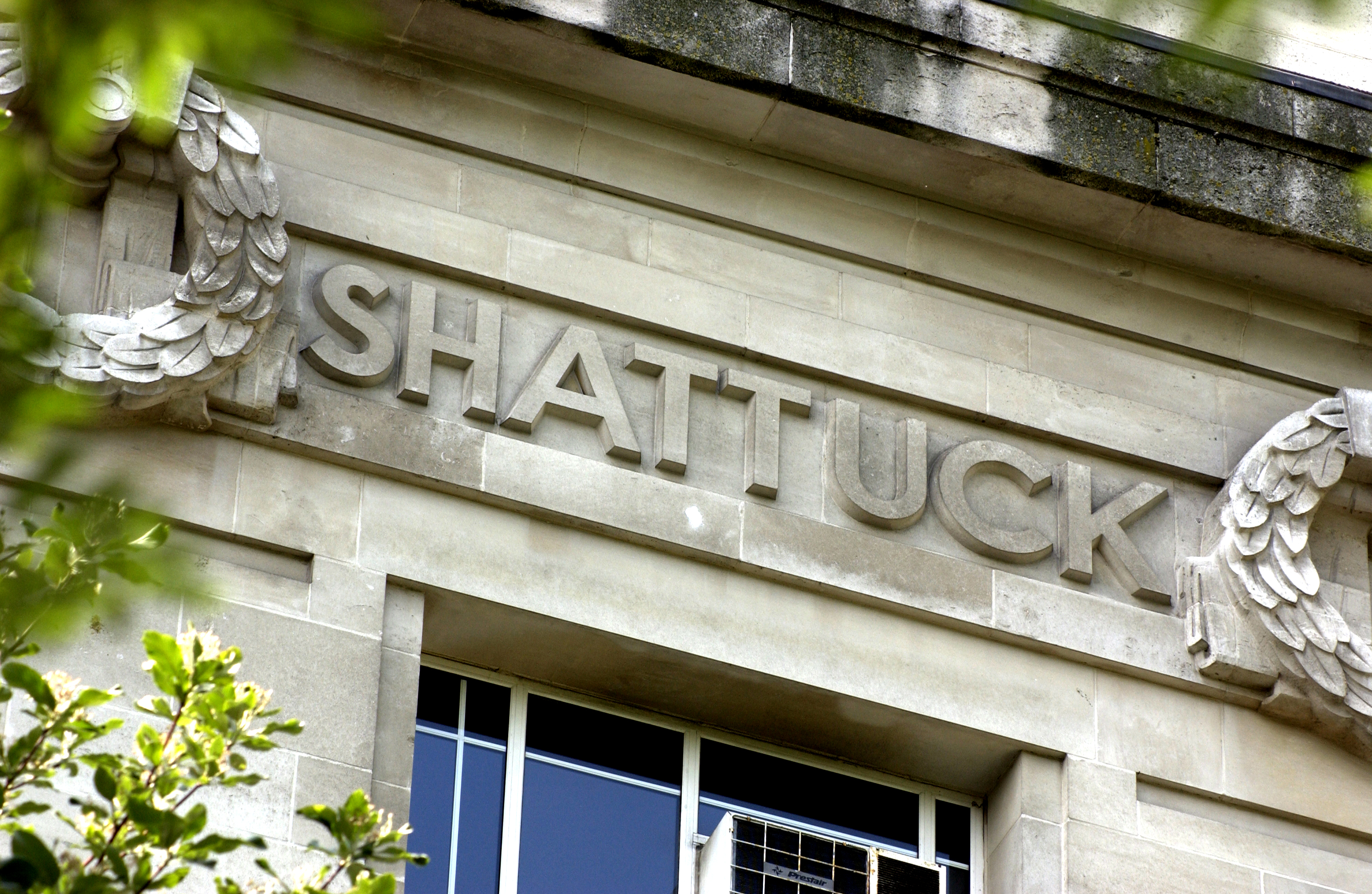
Lemuel Shattuck's name as it appears on the Frieze of the London School of Hygiene & Tropical Medicine.

Lemuel Shattuck is remembered at the London School of Hygiene & Tropical Medicine where his name appears on the school's frieze. The names of 23 pioneers of public health and tropical medicine were chosen to be honored when the School was built in 1929.

Lemuel Shattuck Hospital in Boston is named after him.

Shattuck Street in Boston, the street on which Harvard Medical School sits, is also named after Lemuel Shattuck.

== Works ==
- History of Concord, Mass. (Boston, 1835)
- Vital Statistics of Boston (1841)
- The Census of Boston (1845)
- Report on the Sanitary Condition of Massachusetts (1850)
- Memorials of the Descendants of William Shattuck (1855)
