= Warelands =

Historic house in Massachusetts, United States

- U.S. National Register of Historic Places
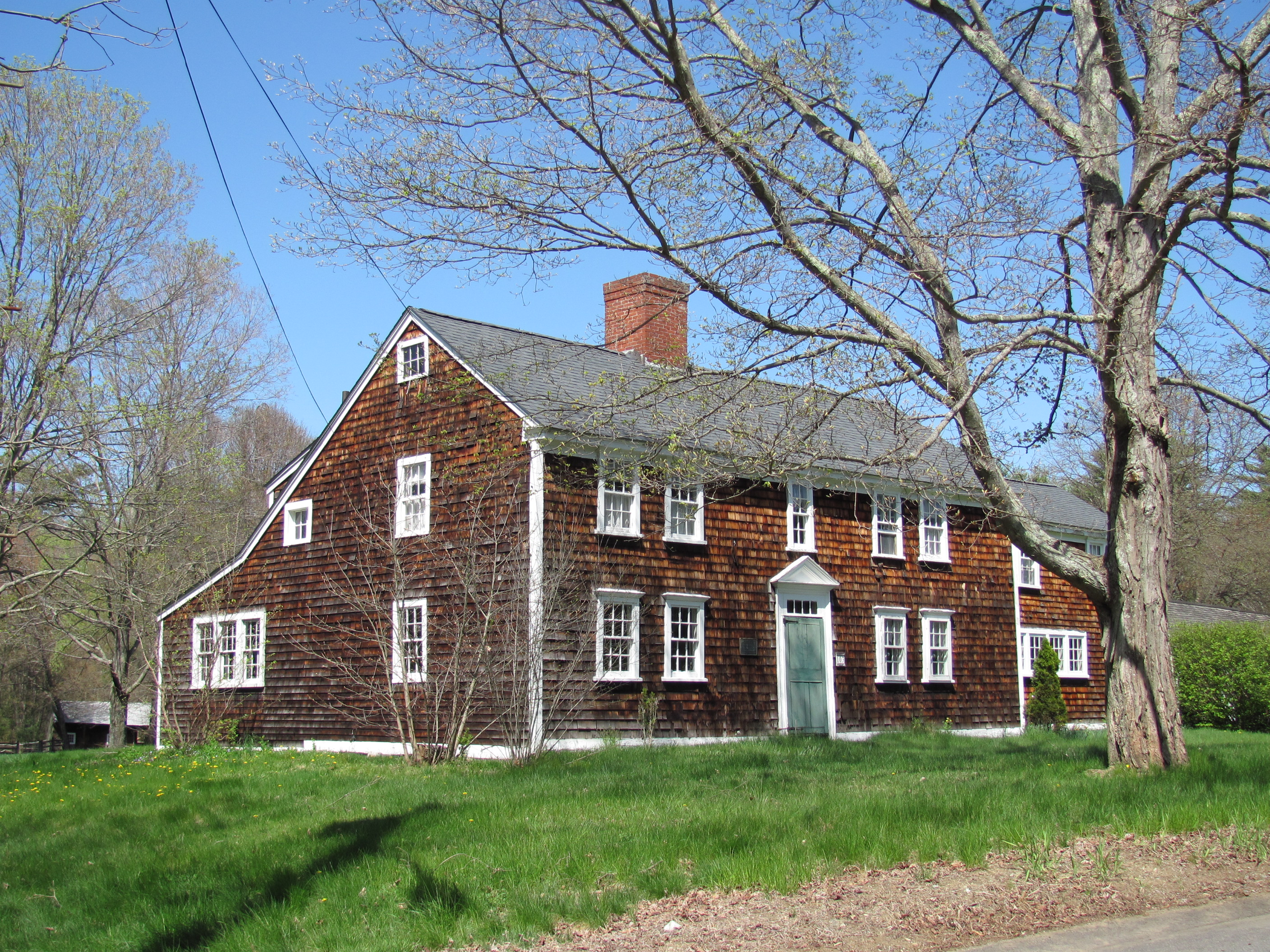
- Warelands

- Location within Massachusetts Location within the United States
- Nearest city: Norfolk, Massachusetts
- Coordinates: 42°7′51″N 71°19′2″W
- Built: 1733
- NRHP reference No.: 77000190
- Added to NRHP: November 10, 1977

Warelands is a historic house at 103 Boardman Street in Norfolk, Massachusetts. The 2 1/2-story wood-frame house was built in 1733 by Ebenezer Ware. It is a well-preserved saltbox style Georgian house, with a massive central chimney, wide plank floors, and well-preserved wood paneling. The property is further significant as the site, between 1905 and 1913, of the Warelands Dairy and Warelands Dairy School, the site of early initiatives in the sanitary handling of milk products.

The house was listed on the National Register of Historic Places in 1977.

== See also ==
- List of the oldest buildings in Massachusetts
- National Register of Historic Places listings in Norfolk County, Massachusetts
