= Dogs on the Inside =

- Directed by: Brean Cunningham; Douglas Seirup
- Produced by: Cindy Meehl; Brean Cunningham; Douglas Seirup
- Starring: Candido Santiago
- Music by: Sam Gay
- Distributed by: BOND/360
- Release date: 2014
- Running time: 67 minutes
- Country: United States
- Language: English

Dogs On The Inside is a 2014 American documentary film about the rehabilitation program in which prisoner inmates are given care of stray and abused dogs at the North Central Correctional Institution in Gardner, Massachusetts. The film follows the pairings of prisoners and dogs from their first meeting through adoption into a loving family.

The rehabilitation program is an initiative under Don't Throw Us Away, a nonprofit that rescues dogs from Southern Kill Shelters and partners them with prisoner inmates to prepare for potential adoption.

== Synopsis ==
Dogs On The Inside explores the problem of abandoned dogs in the Southern United States, where shelters are overcrowded and euthanasia is common. After a devoted team of rescuers transports the dogs, they begin an 8- to 10-week program with prisoner inmates who supply the dogs with basic obedience skills as well as much needed attention. Following research in animal behavior and psychology by Marc Bekoff Ph.D., the program shows that connected by their troubled pasts, the dogs learn to have faith in people again while the inmates are reminded of their own humanity and capacity for love and empathy.

Over the three-month period, the inmates find solace in the companionship with their dogs as well as a confidence in their own ability to affect positive change. One of the inmates, Candido Sanchez draws on his time with the dogs as inspiration for his own upcoming release. As the dogs graduate from the course, he sees the dogs move on to a loving home, which inspires him to transform his own life.

== Production ==
While shot over a three-month period, actual shooting took only three days. Brean Cunningham and Douglas Seirup directed, edited, shot, and produced the title over the course of three years. Also on production was Cindy Meehl. As for music, Sam Gay provided the score.

Cunningham and Seirup co-found their own production company, Expect Miracles Productions.

== Release ==
The film was released on VOD February 10, 2015 and on DVD February 24th, 2015.

== Reception ==
The Toronto Star and NOW Toronto both gave the film favorable reviews, with the former writing "Filmmakers Brean Cunningham's and Douglas Seirup's approach is straightforward, but the prisoners' desire to make a better life for the dogs - and themselves - is what will stick in your memory and your heart."

== Awards ==
- Viola M. Marshall Audience Choice Award, Rhode Island International Film Festival
- Best Feature Documentary, The Rockport Film Festival
