= Bridgewater, Massachusetts =

- City
- Town of Bridgewater
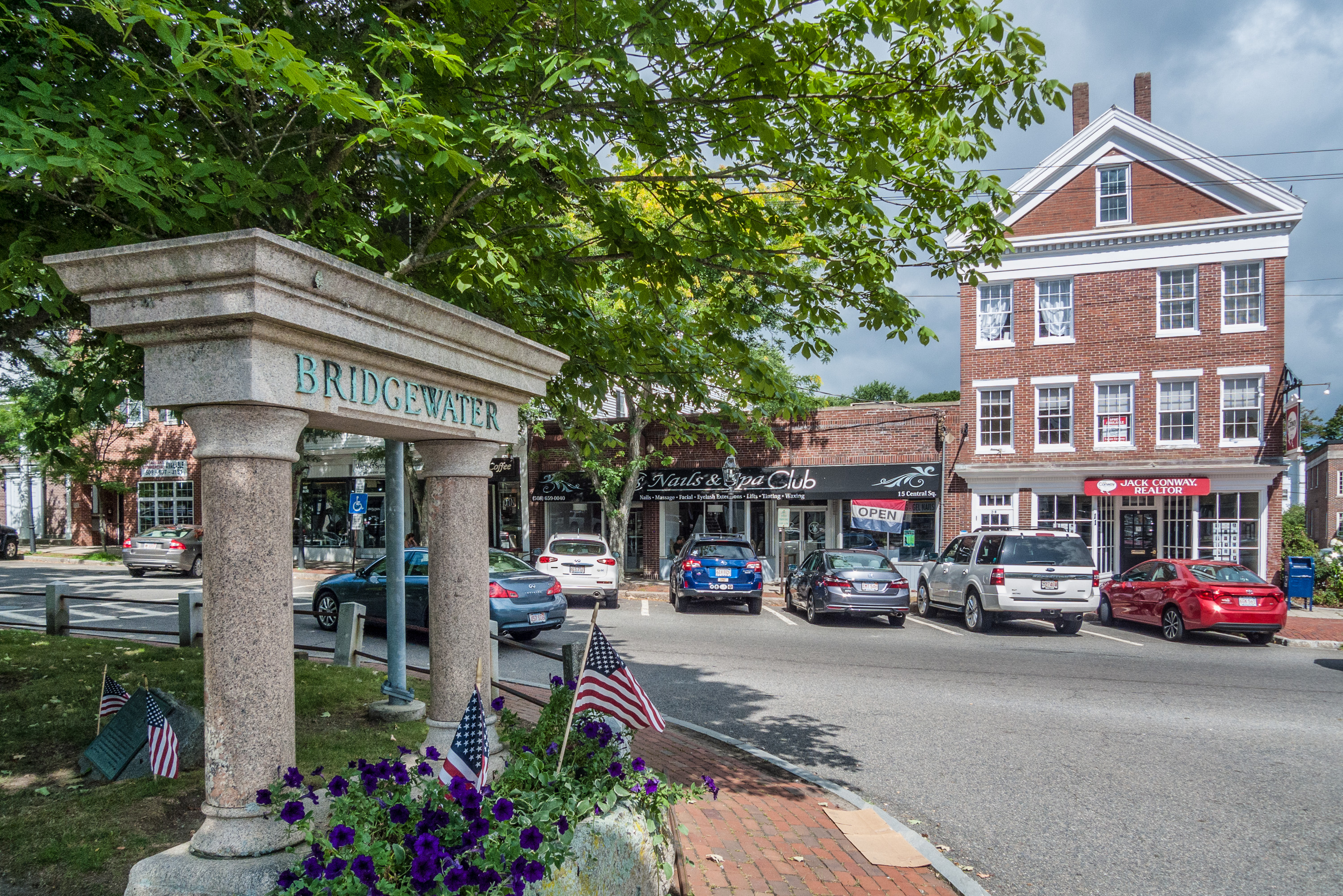
- Bridgewater Central Square

- Flag Seal

- Location in Plymouth County in Massachusetts

- Location in the United States
- Coordinates: 41°59′25″N 70°58′32″W
- Country: United States
- State: Massachusetts
- County: Plymouth
- Settled: 1650
- Incorporated: 1656

Government
  - Type: Town Council
  - Town Manager: Blythe Robinson

Area
  - Total: 28.2 sq mi (73.1 km^{2})
  - Land: 27.5 sq mi (71.2 km^{2})
  - Water: 0.73 sq mi (1.9 km^{2})
- Elevation: 105 ft (32 m)

Population (2020)
  - Total: 28,633
  - Density: 1,040/sq mi (402/km^{2})
- Time zone: UTC-5 (Eastern)
  - Summer (DST): UTC-4 (Eastern)
- ZIP code: 02324, 02325
- Area code: 508 / 774
- FIPS code: 25-08085
- GNIS feature ID: 0619466
- Website: https://www.bridgewaterma.gov/

Bridgewater is a city in Plymouth County, Massachusetts, United States. As of the 2020 U.S. census, the city's population was 28,633. The historic city center of Bridgewater is located approximately 25 miles (40 km) south of Boston, Massachusetts and approximately 35 miles east of Providence, Rhode Island. The town of Bridgewater was formerly a census-designated place (CDP) until 2010, when Bridgewater was granted city status. Today, Bridgewater is one of 13 municipalities in Massachusetts that have applied for and have been granted a city government while claiming "the town of" in their official names.

== History ==
This area was established as a part of Duxbury in 1645 by purchase from the Native Americans by 54 proprietors—most who did not settle there. Bridgewater was established as a Township on June 3, 1656 from Duxbury in Plymouth Colony. The town was placed in Plymouth County when counties were formed in 1685. For a brief time, the town was part of the Dominion of New England from 1686 to 1689. The township expanded by annexation between 1662 and 1798, and the town proper was bounded in 1846. The town is still in Plymouth County, though was in limbo, until the "Colony" was merged with Massachusetts Bay Colony in 1691 that became the Commonwealth of Massachusetts.

== Geography ==
According to the United States Census Bureau, the town has a total area of 28.2 square miles (73 km^{2}), of which 27.5 square miles (71 km^{2}) is land and 0.7 square miles (1.8 km^{2}) (2.62%) is water. Bridgewater is 99th out of the 351 communities in the Commonwealth of Massachusetts, and eighth out of the twenty-seven municipalities in Plymouth County in terms of land area. The town is bordered by West Bridgewater to the northwest, East Bridgewater to the northeast, Halifax to the east, Middleborough to the south, and Raynham to the west. Bridgewater is approximately five miles south of Brockton, 10 miles northeast of Taunton, and 25 miles south of Boston, of which it is a suburb.

Neighborhoods in Bridgewater include Stanley, Scotland Park, Pratt Town, Paper Mill Village, and South Bridgewater.

Bridgewater lies along the Taunton River, which has several other rivers and brooks which branch off the main waterway. There are also several ponds, the largest of which is Lake Nippenicket along the western edge of the town. There is a state forest, a town forest, several conservation areas and a large portion of the Hockomock Swamp Wildlife Management Area, in the western part of town. Parts of this swamp give rise to the so-called Bridgewater Triangle, a small area of concentrated reports of strange Fortean phenomena, colonial "dark days", Bigfoot and mysterious black panthers, UFO sightings, and other weird encounters, a phrase coined by Loren Coleman, author of Mysterious America, often compared to the Bermuda Triangle.

== Demographics ==
Historical population
| Year | Pop. | ±% |
|---|---|---|
| 1765 | 3,942 | — |
| 1776 | 4,364 | +10.7% |
| 1790 | 4,975 | +14.0% |
| 1800 | 5,200 | +4.5% |
| 1810 | 5,157 | −0.8% |
| 1820 | 1,700 | −67.0% |
| 1830 | 1,855 | +9.1% |
| 1840 | 2,131 | +14.9% |
| 1850 | 2,790 | +30.9% |
| 1855 | 3,363 | +20.5% |
| 1860 | 3,761 | +11.8% |
| 1870 | 3,660 | −2.7% |
| 1880 | 3,620 | −1.1% |
| 1890 | 4,249 | +17.4% |
| 1900 | 5,806 | +36.6% |
| 1910 | 7,688 | +32.4% |
| 1920 | 8,438 | +9.8% |
| 1930 | 9,055 | +7.3% |
| 1940 | 8,902 | −1.7% |
| 1950 | 9,512 | +6.9% |
| 1960 | 10,276 | +8.0% |
| 1970 | 12,911 | +25.6% |
| 1980 | 17,202 | +33.2% |
| 1990 | 21,249 | +23.5% |
| 2000 | 25,185 | +18.5% |
| 2010 | 26,563 | +5.5% |
| 2020 | 28,633 | +7.8% |
| 2025* | 29,309 | +2.4% |
* = population estimate. Source: United States census records and Population Estimates Program data.

As of the census of 2000, there were 25,185 people, 7,526 households, and 5,584 families residing in the town. The population density was 916.2 inhabitants per square mile (353.7/km^{2}). There were 7,652 housing units at an average density of 278.4 per square mile (107.5/km^{2}). The racial makeup of the town was 87.28% White, 17.47% People of Color.

There were 7,526 households, out of which 38.6% had children under the age of 18 living with them, 61.5% were married couples living together, 9.5% had a female householder with no husband present, and 25.8% were non-families. 19.6% of all households were made up of individuals, and 7.7% had someone living alone who was 65 years of age or older. The average household size was 2.81 and the average family size was 3.27.

In the town, the population was spread out, with 22.9% under the age of 18, 14.7% from 18 to 24, 32.9% from 25 to 44, 20.9% from 45 to 64, and 8.6% who were 65 years of age or older. The median age was 34 years. For every 100 females, there were 110.7 males. For every 100 females age 18 and over, there were 111.9 males.

The median income for a household in the town was $65,318, and the median income for a family was $73,953. Males had a median income of $48,438 versus $32,383 for females. The per capita income for the town was $23,105. About 1.9% of families and 3.5% of the population were below the poverty line, including 2.6% of those under age 18 and 6.1% of those age 65 or over.

Bridgewater is the 71st largest municipality in the Commonwealth by population, and 110th by population density. In the county, Bridgewater ranks third in population and seventh in density.

=== Early demographics ===
Populations from 1765 through 1840, and 1855 are from a non-government source. From 1820 forward, the population excludes North, West and East Bridgewater.

== Economy ==
In the late 1960s, the economy of Bridgewater was dependent upon the Old Colony Correctional Center and other Massachusetts Correctional Institutions of the MCD in Bridgewater, Bridgewater State Hospital and the Bridgewater Teacher's College (now the Bridgewater State University). Donald Cabana, who served as a prison guard at the Bridgewater prison and later became the superintendent of the Mississippi State Penitentiary, said that "the community promoted the fact that it was home to the United States's first "normal school" (teachers' college), while the prison was "often mentioned in less glowing terms".

For most of the nineteenth and early twentieth centuries, Bridgewater's economy was largely dependent on the factories located within the town. Bridgewater is renowned and known for its iron works factories, one of which is appropriately named Bridgewater Iron Works and is a registered historical site in Massachusetts. The majority of the Iron Works factory was torn down in 1994 and turned into Ironworks Park. Bridgewater has numerous iron works companies still in business. The town also had multiple paper mills, sawmills, and a boot and shoe factory. The boot and shoe factory still stands today, as of 1998, off Broad Street, adjacent to the MBTA Commuter Train rail tracks. Although the factory no longer manufactures shoes, in 1998 it still housed numerous businesses and storage units.

== Government ==
=== Local government ===
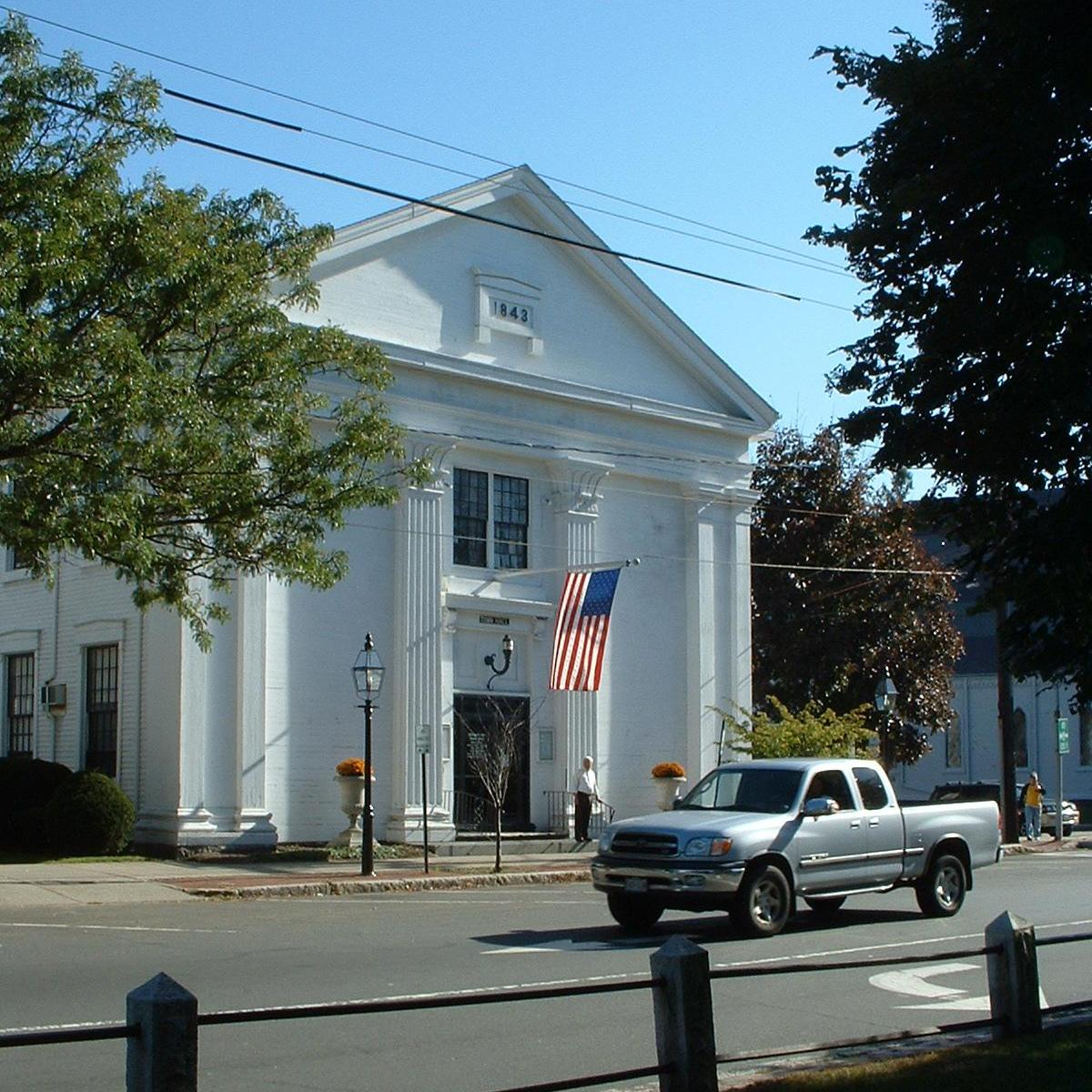
Bridgewater Town Hall

Bridgewater was formerly governed on the local level by the open town meeting form of government, led by a Board of Selectmen until January 2011. Bridgewater is now led by three District Councilors, 1 per district, and six Councilors-at-large, with an appointed Town Manager, Assessor, Tax Collector, for a total of nine Councilors. Bridgewater is one of fourteen Massachusetts municipalities that have applied for, and been granted, city forms of government but wish to retain "The town of" in their official names. This is from the majority 'Yes' vote on Question #1 at the April 24, 2010 annual town election, to change from a five-person, elected Board of Selectmen to a nine-person, elected Town Council, and thus abolishing the Annual Town Meeting, which was held in 2010 after generations. Town facilities are located at the center of town, with the Police Department headquarters being just west of the Square along Mass. Route 104. There are two fire stations located in town, with one station located next to the college and the other station in the eastern part of town, directly behind the Town Hall. There is one U.S. Post Office branch, located just north of the town center along Mass. Route 18.

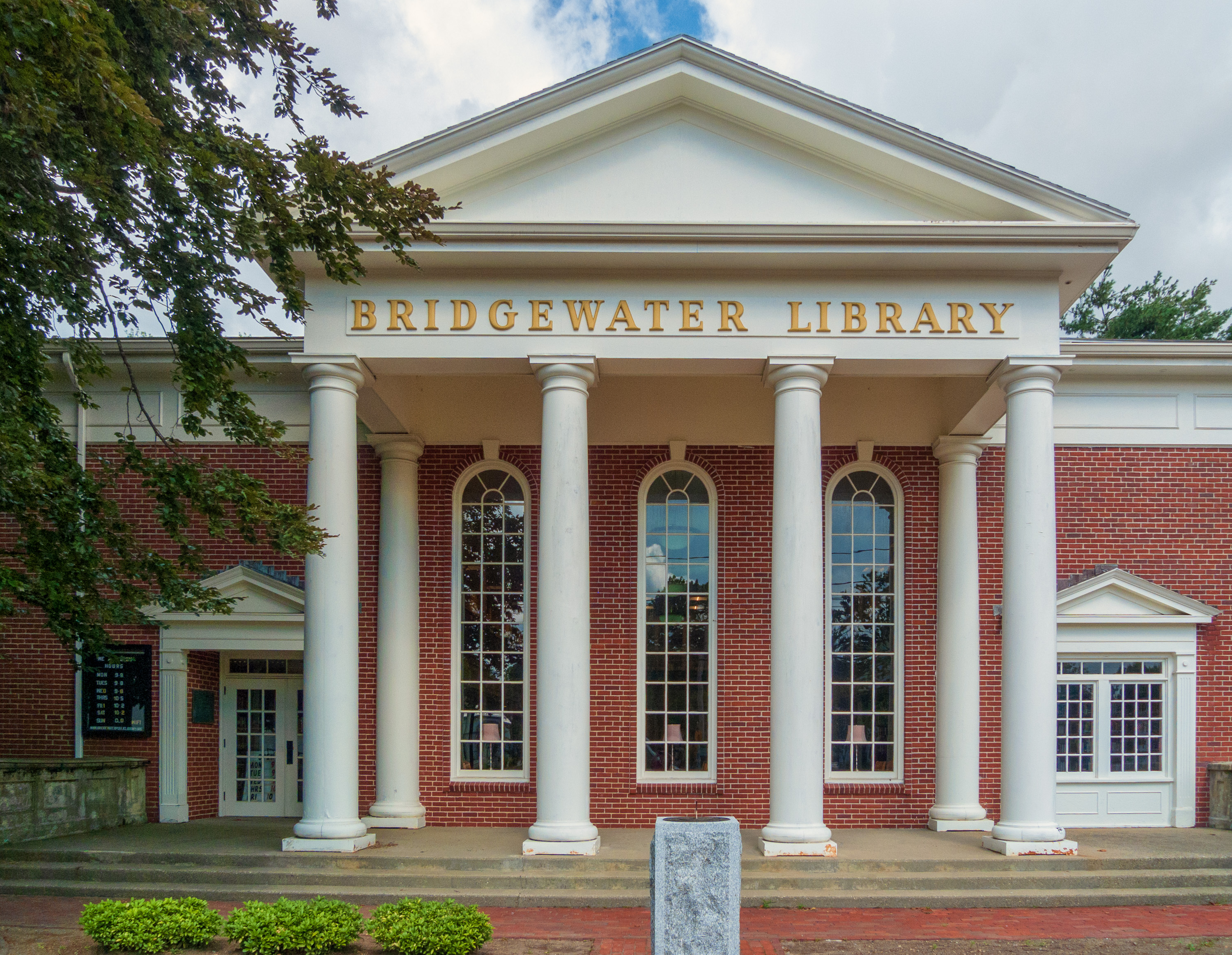
Bridgewater public library

The Bridgewater Public Library is just north of the town center, and is a part of the SAILS Library Network.

=== State representation ===
On the Commonwealth level, Bridgewater is represented in the Massachusetts House of Representatives of the General Court of Massachusetts as a portion of the Eighth Plymouth District, which includes Raynham. In the Massachusetts Senate, the Town is a part of the Norfolk, Plymouth and Bristol District, which also includes Easton, West Bridgewater, Milton, Stoughton, and parts of Braintree and Randolph. The Town is also patrolled by the Fourth (Middleborough) Barracks of Troop 'D' of the Massachusetts State Police.

The Massachusetts Department of Correction operates several correctional facilities in the Bridgewater Correctional Complex in Bridgewater. The prisons in the complex include Bridgewater State Hospital, Massachusetts Alcohol and Substance Abuse Center, Massachusetts Treatment Center, and Old Colony Correctional Center.

=== Federal representation ===
On the national level, Bridgewater is a part of Massachusetts's 9th congressional district, which has been represented in the United States House of Representatives since 2013 by William Keating, a Democrat. The Commonwealth's senior member of the United States Senate, elected in 2012, is Elizabeth Warren. Warren defeated incumbent Republican Senator Scott Brown, who had won a special election in 2010 to win the seat after the death of Ted Kennedy. Ed Markey became the commonwealth's junior Senator after he won a special election to the U.S. Senate to succeed John Kerry after the latter's confirmation as Secretary of State. The Town also has a Massachusetts National Guard armory along Mass. Route 18.

== Education ==
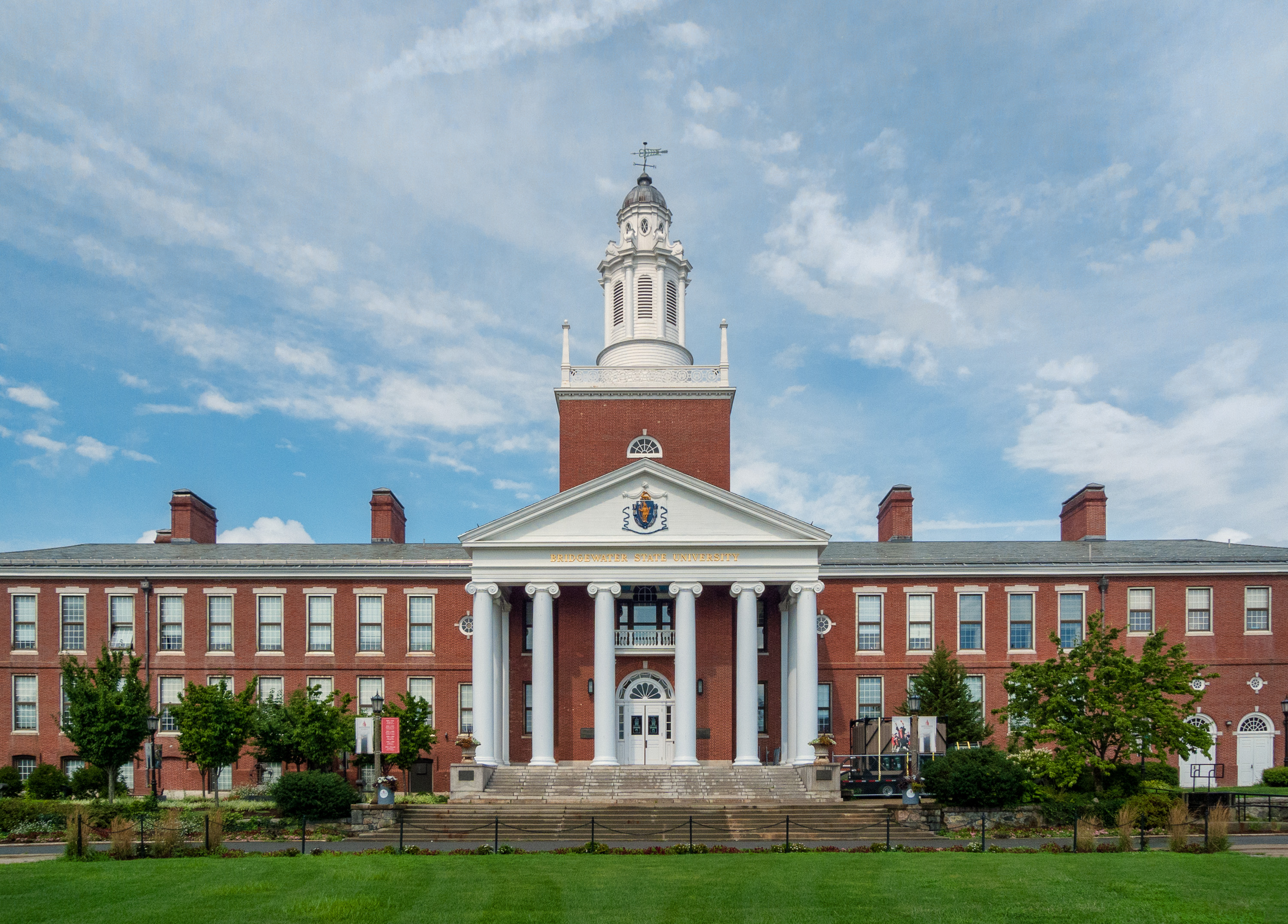
Boyden Hall, on the Bridgewater State University campus

Bridgewater shares its school district with neighboring Raynham, with both towns operating their own elementary and middle schools, and sending their students to a common high school. Bridgewater has one elementary school, George H. Mitchell Elementary School (south and west of the town center - formerly known as Bridgewater Elementary), which serves students from kindergarten through grade two. All the third, fourth, and fifth, graders attend M.G. Williams Intermediate School, while sixth, seventh and eighth graders attend Bridgewater Middle School. The Bridgewater-Raynham Regional High School is located in Bridgewater, west of the town center. B-R's athletics teams are nicknamed the "Trojans", and their colors are red and white. The athletic teams of the Bridgewater Middle School use the "Spartans" nickname.

In 2015 during February vacation, the roof of the Mitchell Elementary school collapsed due to heavy snow. The students at the elementary school were moved to Bridgewater Middle School, and the students at the middle school were split between the Williams Intermediate School and Bridgewater-Raynham Regional High School.

High school students may also attend West Bridgewater Middle-Senior High School in West Bridgewater, Bristol-Plymouth Regional Technical School in Taunton, Coyle-Cassidy High School in Taunton, Cardinal Spellman High School in Brockton, Norfolk County Agricultural High School in Walpole, or Bristol County Agricultural High School in Dighton.

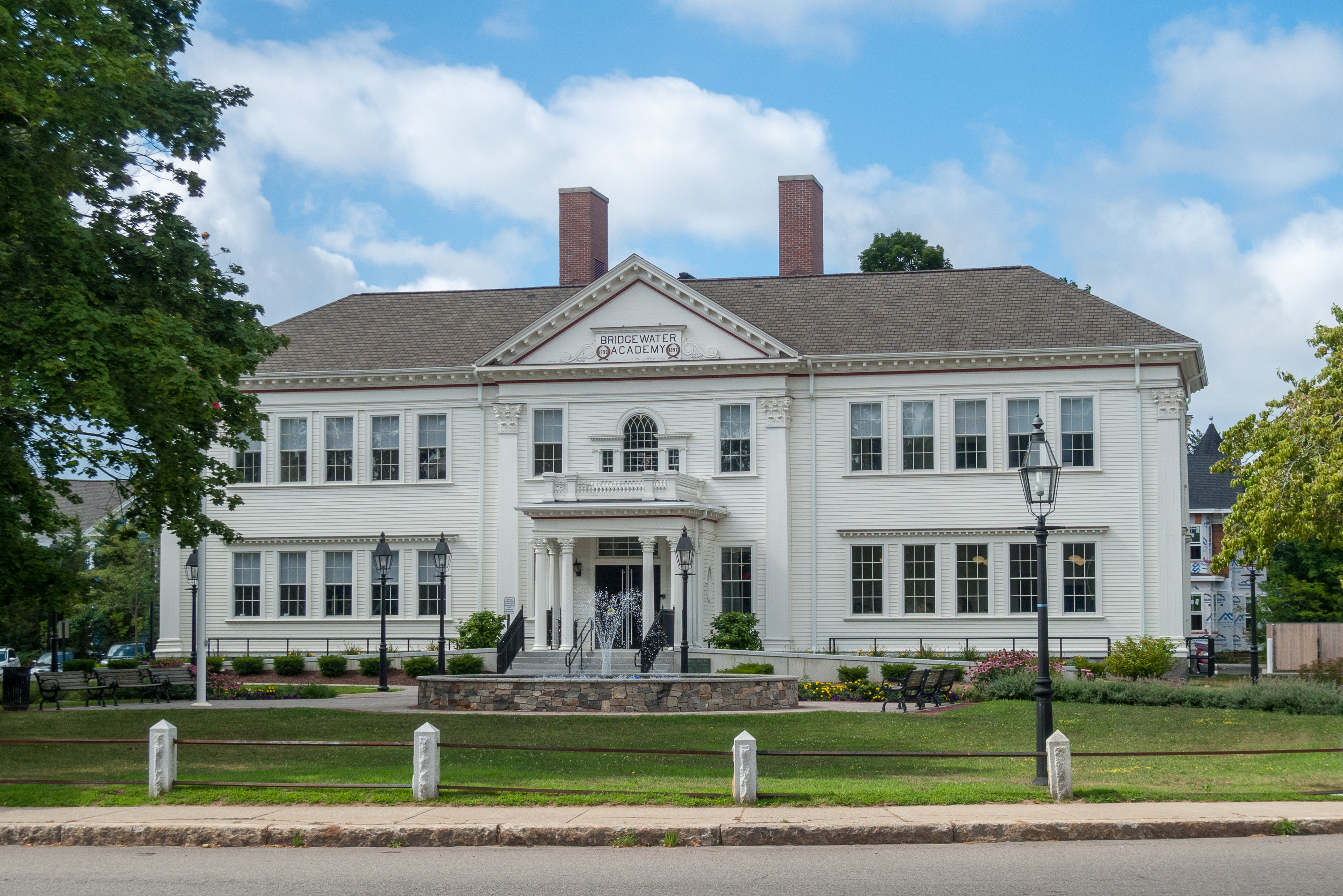
Bridgewater Academy building. Built 1868.

Bridgewater was formerly the site of the well-known, influential Bridgewater Academy, a private high school formerly located on the "Town Common" (park). It was attended by many young men of the area in the early and mid 19th century, including a Massachusetts-born merchant/philanthropist Enoch Pratt (1808–1896), in the late 1830s, who endowed the Public Library in his hometown of North Middleborough and also set up the Enoch Pratt Free Library, one of the first free public library systems in America.

The town is also home to Bridgewater State University, a public liberal arts university that was founded as a "normal school" (now teachers' school) in 1840. It is the largest of the state's nine state universities outside of the University of Massachusetts system itself. As of 2022, approximately 8,000 undergraduate students and 1,500 postgraduate students were enrolled at the university.

== Transportation ==
Bridgewater is the site of the intersection of Interstate 495 and Mass. Route 24, with only a one-mile stretch of the interstate highway running through the southwestern corner of the town. Just north of this intersection along Mass. Route 24 are two large service areas, both of which have restaurants and a gas station. They are the only two such full service areas along Mass. Route 24, or, for that matter, anywhere along the highways of Southeastern Massachusetts (aside from a stop along U.S. Route 6 in Barnstable; that stop, however, is considered to be off the highway). At the center of town, Mass. Route 18, Mass. Route 28 and Mass. Route 104 meet at the Town Common. Mass. Routes 18 and 28, both north–south routes, are coextensive from this point south to the road's intersection with U.S. Route 44 in Middleborough. Mass. Route 104 passes from east to west, with ramp access to Mass. Route 24 in the west. A short portion of Mass. Route 106 passes along the town line in the northeast of town; Mass. Route 104 's eastern terminus is at that route, just along the East Bridgewater line.

The Fall River/New Bedford Line of the MBTA Commuter Rail system runs north-south through Bridgewater, with Bridgewater station located at the Bridgewater State University campus. There is a small air strip in nearby Taunton, and the nearest national air service can be found at T. F. Green Airport outside Providence and at Logan International Airport in Boston.

== Notable people ==
- Nathaniel Ames (1708–1764), born in Bridgewater, publisher of first annual almanac
- George Leonard Andrews (1828–1899), born in Bridgewater, noted United States Army officer, engineer, and educator
- Drew Bledsoe, NFL quarterback for New England Patriots, resided in Bridgewater during his time with team
- Love Brewster, passenger on Mayflower and a founder of Bridgewater
- Jim Cheyunski, NFL linebacker for New England Patriots, Buffalo Bills, and Baltimore Colts, born in Bridgewater
- Neil Cicierega (born 1986), American filmmaker, YouTuber, animator, and musician
- Mickey Cochrane (1903–1962), Baseball Hall of Fame catcher, born in Bridgewater
- Marc Colombo, former NFL player for Dallas Cowboys, Chicago Bears and Miami Dolphins, resided on Highview Terrace
- Alton Desnoyer (1905 – 1982), born in Bridgewater, member of the New Hampshire House of Representatives
- Charles Garry, was an American civil rights attorney of Armenian descent, who represented a number of high-profile clients in political cases.
- Bruce Gray, sculptor and artist
- Elijah Hayward (1786–1864), politician and judge who was born and raised in Bridgewater.
- Steven Laffoley (born 1965), author of creative-nonfiction and fiction books, including the award-winning Shadowboxing: the Rise and Fall of George Dixon (2012)
- Enoch Pratt (1808–1896), merchant, businessman, philanthropist in Baltimore, Maryland (see above)
- Louise Dickinson Rich (1903–1991), author of books for children and adults, wrote of her childhood in Bridgewater in Innocence Under the Elms

== Media ==
- The Enterprise
- The Bridgewater Independent, published every Wednesday
- The Comment, Bridgewater State University student newspaper
- WBIM-FM 91.5, Bridgewater State University radio station
