= North Central Correctional Institution =

Prison in Massachusetts, United States

- Location in Massachusetts
- Location: Gardner, MA; 42°34′47″N 71°56′30″W
- Security class: Medium/Minimum
- Capacity: Operational Capacity: 974 Operational Occupancy: 91%
- Opened: 1983
- Managed by: Massachusetts Department of Correction
- Director: Superintendent Matthew Divris

North Central Correctional Institution is a medium/minimum security prison located in Gardner, MA. Within the facility are eighteen buildings, with a perimeter consisting of two chain-linked fences topped with razor wire. The perimeter is guarded by three towers and foot patrols of K9 teams. It is under the jurisdiction of the Massachusetts Department of Correction. NCCI is considered a low medium due to the interior design of the facility. It is a converted state hospital facility with many dormitory style units. The inmate population consists of adult male felons serving sentences ranging from 2.5 years to life. On January 6, 2020, there were 974 inmates in general population beds.

== Covid cases ==
Pursuant to the Supreme Judicial Court's April 3, 2020 Opinion and Order in the Committee for Public Counsel Services v. Chief Justice of the Trial Court, SJC-12926 matter, as amended on April 10, April 28 and June 23, 2020 (the “Order”), the Special Master posts weekly reports which are located on the SJC website here for COVID testing and cases for each of the correctional facilities administered by the Department of Correction and each of the county Sheriffs’ offices. The SJC Special master link above has the most up to date information reported by the correctional agencies and is posted for the public to view.

1 inmate at NCCI has died from Covid.

== Notable Inmates ==
- Walter Shelley - Was sentenced to life in prison in 2014 for the 1969 murder of John J. McCabe.

== In media ==
The prison was the subject of the 2014 documentary Dogs on the Inside, which looked the prison’s dog therapy program.

== Prison Address ==
NCCI/Gardner
500 Colony Road
PO Box 466
Gardner, MA 01440
