= Boston Pre-Release Center =

Correctional facility in Roslindale, Massachusetts

Coordinates: 42°17′33″N 71°06′05″W

- Interactive map of Boston Pre-Release Center
- Location: Roslindale, Massachusetts
- Status: Operational
- Security class: Minimum/ Pre-Release
- Capacity: Operational Capacity: 175 Operational Occupancy: 51%
- Opened: 2003
- Managed by: Massachusetts Department of Correction
- Director: Superintendent Thomas Neville

The Boston Pre-Release Center is a minimum security correctional facility located on Canterbury Street in Roslindale, Massachusetts. The current facility opened in 2003 and it is under the jurisdiction of the Massachusetts Department of Correction. As of January 6, 2020 there was 90 inmates in general population beds.

== History ==
In November 1972, the Boston Pre-Release Center became the first pre-release correctional facility in the commonwealth of Massachusetts.

On October 31, 2003, the BPRC opened its doors at its new location on Canterbury Street in Roslindale, Massachusetts.

== COVID-19 Cases ==
Pursuant to the Supreme Judicial Court's April 3, 2020 Opinion and Order in the Committee for Public Counsel Services v. Chief Justice of the Trial Court, SJC-12926 matter, as amended on April 10, April 28 and June 23, 2020 (the “Order”), the Special Master posted weekly reports which were located on the SJC website here for COVID testing and cases for each of the correctional facilities administered by the Department of Correction and each of the county Sheriffs’ offices. The SJC Special master link above has not been updated since September 15, 2021.

== Facility ==
The Boston Pre-Release Center is a 200-bed facility designed to provide inmates gradual transition from prison life to the community. The facility utilizes inmate work crews supervised by correction officers to work through the city of Boston and the surrounding towns.

Boston Pre-Release Center
430 Canterbury Street
Roslindale, MA 02131
