= Norfolk, Massachusetts =

- Town
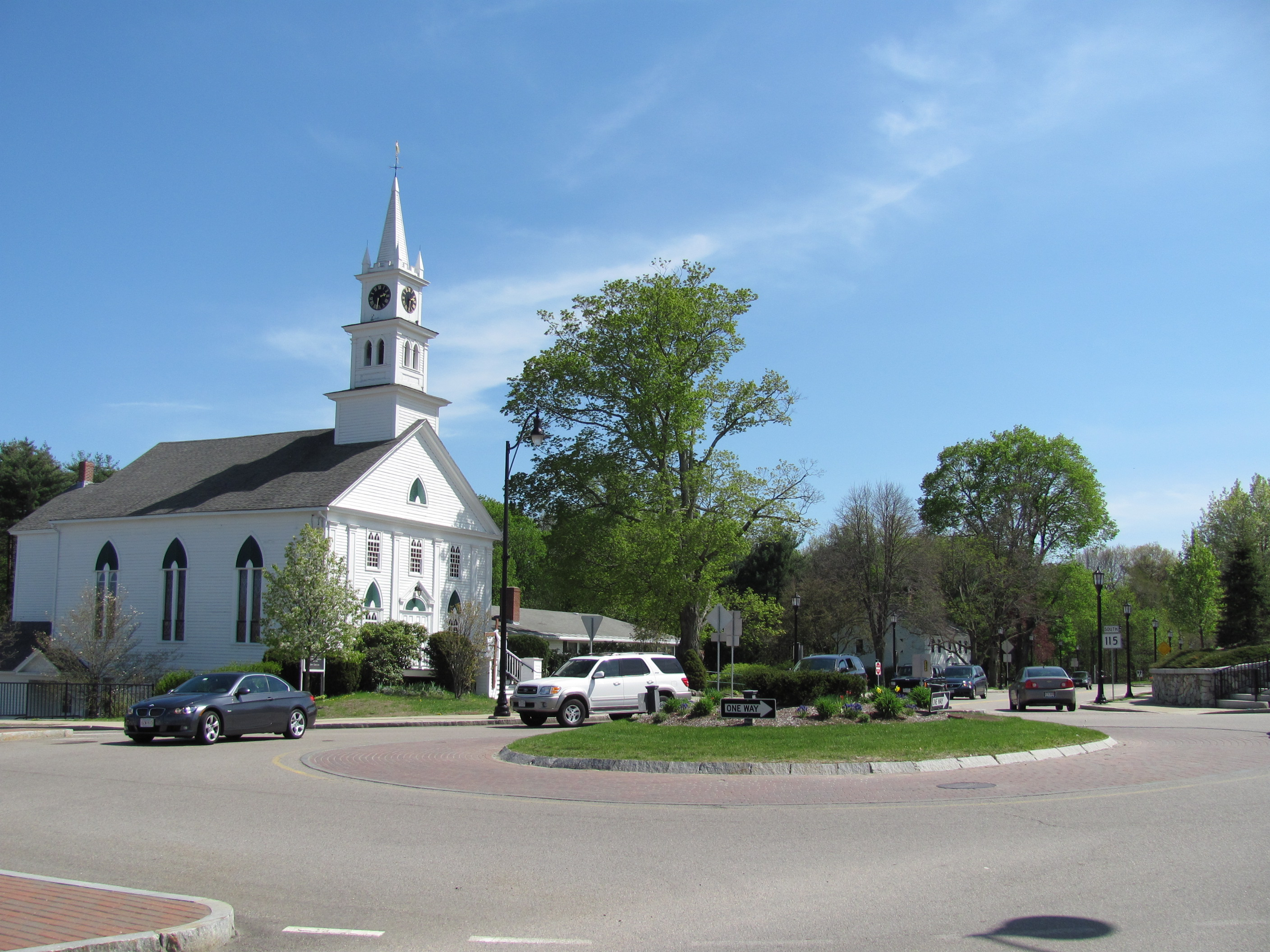
- Federated Church of Norfolk

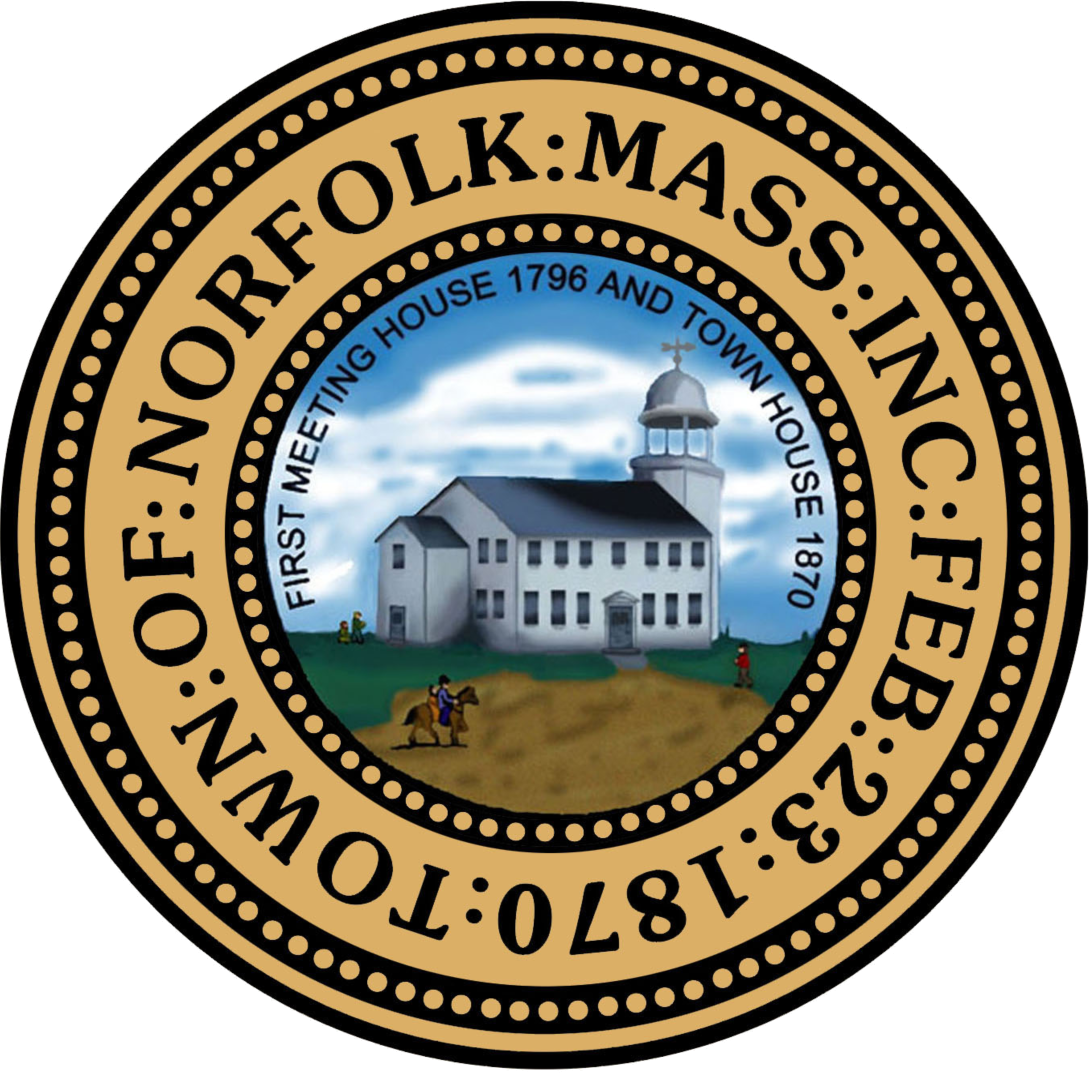
- Seal

- Location in Norfolk County in Massachusetts
- Coordinates: 42°07′10″N 71°19′32″W
- Country: United States
- State: Massachusetts
- County: Norfolk
- Settled: 1695
- Incorporated: 1870

Government
  - Type: Open town meeting
  - Town Administrator: Michael Gallagher

Area
  - Total: 15.2 sq mi (39.3 km^{2})
  - Land: 14.8 sq mi (38.4 km^{2})
  - Water: 0.35 sq mi (0.9 km^{2})
- Elevation: 213 ft (65 m)

Population (2020)
  - Total: 11,662
  - Density: 787/sq mi (303.7/km^{2})
- Time zone: UTC−5 (Eastern)
  - Summer (DST): UTC−4 (Eastern)
- ZIP Code: 02056
- Area code: 508/774
- FIPS code: 25-46050
- GNIS feature ID: 0618326
- Website: norfolkmass.gov

Norfolk (/ˈnɔːrfək/ NOR-fək, locally /ˈnɔːrfɔːrk/ NOR-fork) is a New England town in Norfolk County, Massachusetts, United States, with a population of 11,662 people at the 2020 census. Formerly known as North Wrentham, Norfolk broke away to become an independent town in 1870.

== History ==
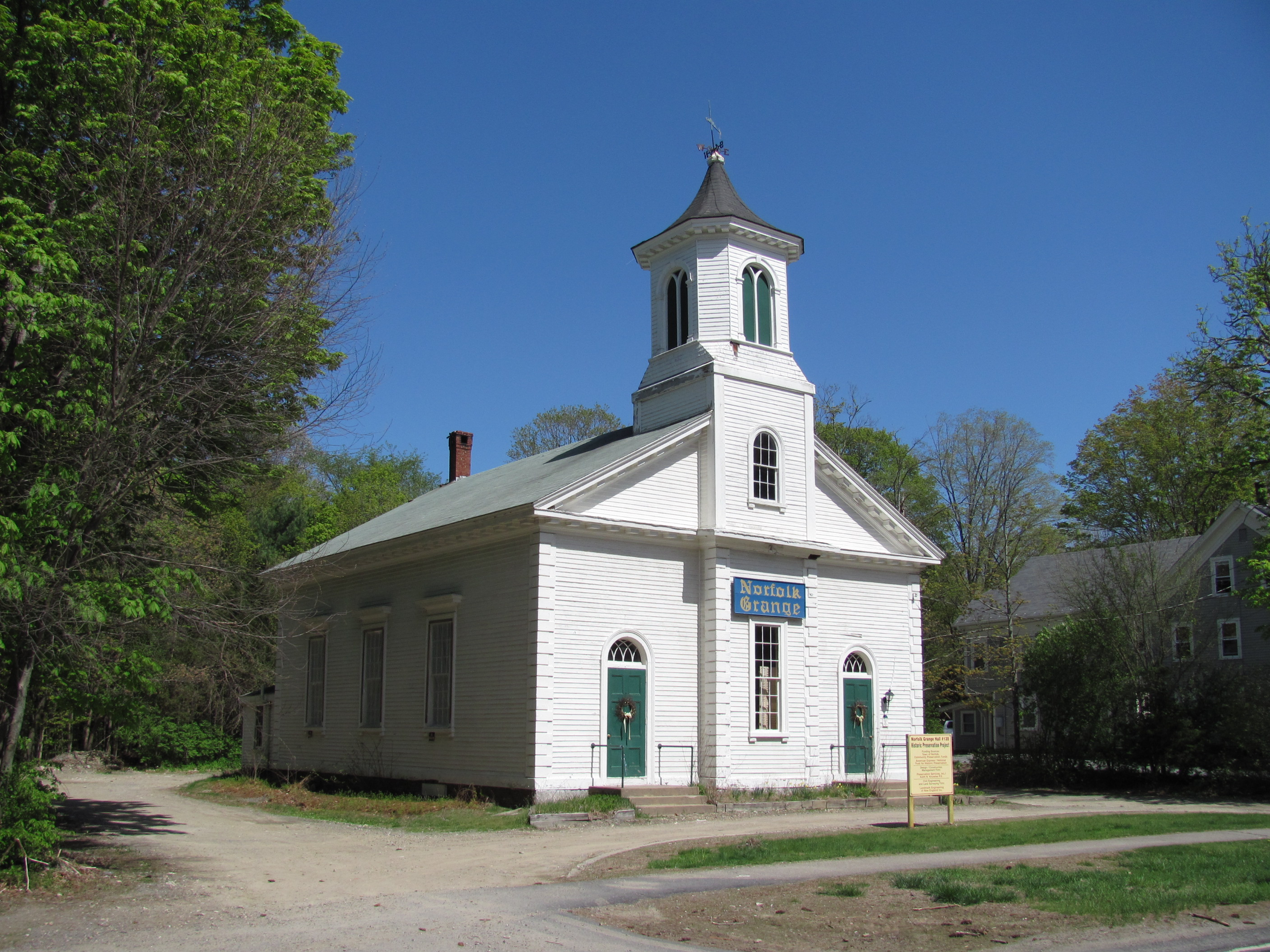
Norfolk Grange Hall, built in 1863

Norfolk is a suburban town on the periphery of metropolitan Boston, located on an upper valley of the Charles River. The land was originally part of Dedham, which was incorporated in 1636. There were a half dozen small farms in the area after 1669, the result of a determined effort to populate the colonial frontier, despite the remoteness of the area. Wrentham separated from Dedham in 1673; what is now Norfolk was in the northern part of Wrentham. The farms were abandoned during King Philip's War in 1675–76, but repopulated later that century.

As further settlement occurred in the late 17th and 18th centuries, agriculture and cattle grazing were joined by lumbering and planting of orchards. Small villages formed around sawmills and gristmills including City Mills (1680), Mann Pond/Highland Lake (after 1691), and Pondville (after 1730). The village center of North Wrentham formed in the late 18th century. After 1812, three cotton manufacturing companies were established at Stony Brook, and later in the 19th century George Campbell's paper mill was opened at Highland Lake making heavy wrapping and building papers. The Norfolk County Railroad opened in 1849, with North Wrentham station near the village center. North Wrentham separated from Wrentham in 1870 and was incorporated as Norfolk.

The town saw a rapid increase in population after 1925 when a hospital and a state prison were built in Norfolk on the Walpole line. Major residential development took place before 1940 in the Pondville and Clark Streets section of town with scattered new housing along Seekonk and Main Streets, and suburban residential building has continued since. In 2014, Norfolk was the filming location for Ted 2, a comedy film starring Mark Wahlberg and Seth MacFarlane.

== Geography ==
According to the United States Census Bureau, the town has a total area of 15.2 square miles (39 km^{2}), of which 14.8 square miles (38 km^{2}) is land and 0.3 square miles (0.78 km^{2}) (2.30%) is water.

== Demographics ==
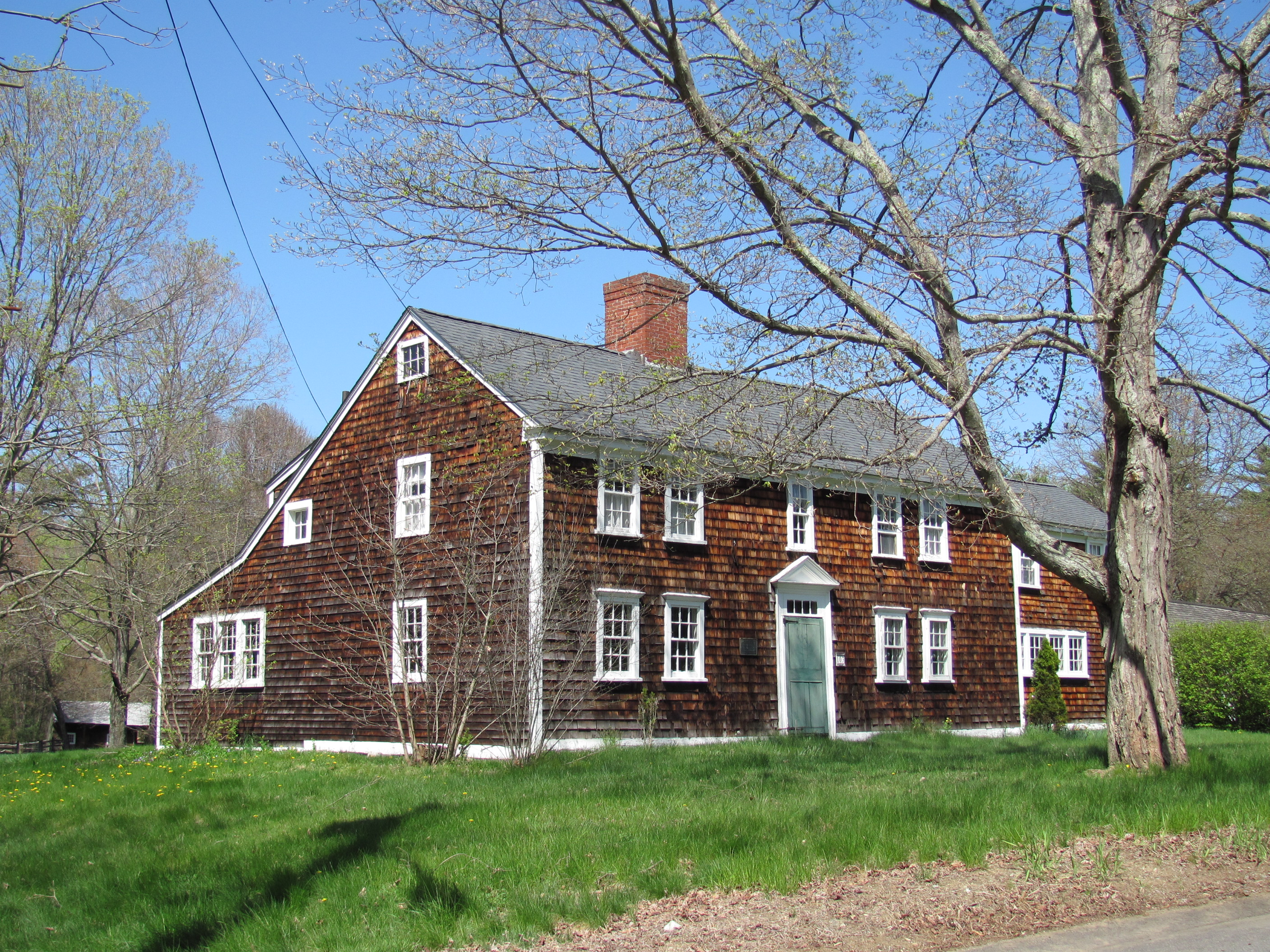
Warelands

Historical population
Year	Pop.	±%
1870	1,081	—
1880	930	−14.0%
1890	913	−1.8%
1900	980	+7.3%
1910	960	−2.0%
1920	1,159	+20.7%
1930	1,429	+23.3%
1940	2,294	+60.5%
1950	2,704	+17.9%
1960	3,471	+28.4%
1970	4,656	+34.1%
1980	6,363	+36.7%
1990	9,270	+45.7%
2000	10,460	+12.8%
2010	11,227	+7.3%
2020	11,662	+3.9%
2022	11,552	−0.9%

As of the 2000 census, there were 10,460 people, 2,818 households, and 2,412 families residing in Norfolk. The population density was 705.1 inhabitants per square mile (272.2/km^{2}). There were 2,861 housing units at an average density of 192.9 per square mile (74.5/km^{2}). The racial makeup of the town was 88.97% White, 4.90% African American, 0.31% Native American, 1.18% Asian, 0.02% Pacific Islander, 3.43% from other races, and 1.20% from two or more races. Hispanic or Latino of any race were 4.88% of the population.

There were 2,818 households, out of which 50.5% had children under the age of 18 living with them, 78.1% were married couples living together, 5.7% had a female householder with no husband present, and 14.4% were non-families. 10.8% of all households were made up of individuals, and 4.5% had someone living alone who was 65 years of age or older. The average household size was 3.08 and the average family size was 3.36.

In the town, the population was spread out, with 27.2% under the age of 18, 4.5% from 18 to 24, 36.9% from 25 to 44, 25.8% from 45 to 64, and 5.5% who were 65 years of age or older. The median age was 37 years. For every 100 females, there were 142.6 males. For every 100 females age 18 and over, there were 157.3 males.

The median income for a household in the town was $86,153, and the median income for a family was $92,001. Males had a median income of $60,926 versus $40,825 for females. The per capita income for the town was $32,454. About 0.8% of families and 1.1% of the population were below the poverty threshold, including 0.2% of those under age 18 and 3.9% of those age 65 or over.

== Government ==
=== Local ===
Norfolk has a select board style government. The town is governed by three selectmen, each elected for three year staggered terms. The current members are Anita Mecklenburg, Kevin Roache, and Taiese Hickman. The town also elects a town clerk, assessors, constables, library trustees, planning board, recreation commission, board of health, housing authority, and school committee members. In total there exist 21 boards and committees in town.

=== State ===
The town is represented in the Massachusetts State Senate by Democrat Rebecca Rausch (Massachusetts Senate's Norfolk, Bristol and Middlesex district). She has served since 2019. Marcus Vaughn, a Republican, represents the town in the Massachusetts House of Representatives (9th Norfolk district).

=== Federal ===
Jake Auchincloss represents the town in the United States House of Representatives, and Elizabeth Warren and Edward Markey represent Norfolk in the United States Senate.

== Education ==
As of 2022, there are three public schools located within the town: the H. Olive Day Elementary School (grades Pre-K–2), the Freeman-Kennedy Elementary School (grades 3–6), and King Philip Regional Middle School (grades 7–8).

For secondary education Norfolk is in the King Philip Regional School District, which operates the public middle school and the comprehensive high school for Norfolk. Upon entering the 9th grade, students will go on to attend King Philip Regional High School in Wrentham, or specialty high schools operated by other agencies such as Tri-County Regional Vocational Technical High School in Franklin and Norfolk County Agricultural High School in Walpole. A new public library building recently opened on town hill. Inside the new library in 2009, a one-room school house, the original public library building, was reopened as a meeting room and historical landmark.

== Infrastructure ==
The Town of Norfolk instituted a Department of Public Works in 2004 which consolidated much of its infrastructure and is now responsible for eight divisions. These Divisions are Water, Wastewater, Stormwater, Solid Waste, Highways, Trees, Vehicle Maintenance and Grounds which are all managed by a Director.

The Norfolk Airpark (FAA airport code 32M) had one 2,700-foot (820 m) north–south runway and is about 2 miles (3 km) west of the town center. In recent years, however, the airpark has been closed down and is currently in a state of disrepair. A seven house cul-de-sac known as Tailwind Cir now exists where the hangars used to stand while the remaining airport property is now conservation land known as Leland Wild.

The Norfolk MBTA commuter rail station is in Zone 5 and is located in the town's center at 9 Rockwood Road.

== Emergency services ==
The Norfolk Police Department is a fairly small department located on Sharon Avenue in the south of town near the Norfolk–Wrentham town line. It is staffed by a total of 17 police officers, including the chief of police. The town's fire department and emergency medical services, located in the center of town on Main Street, was staffed full-time with 24h/7d coverage for the first time in April 2001, and since 2004 provides Advanced Life Support services. The Fire Department is staffed by 13 career firefighters, which includes the fire chief. The police and fire communications department (also known as dispatch) is operated by a total of four full-time dispatchers and six part-time dispatchers. All of these emergency services are located in the police station complex on Sharon Avenue.

At a special town meeting in December 2015, a small turnout of Norfolk voters approved a plan to construct a new police and public safety building on Sharon Street in the south part of town. The police department will be moved to this facility, with the fire department occupying the space vacated by the police. A regional communications center within the Public Safety Building will support the dispatch requirements of Norfolk and three surrounding towns: Wrentham, Plainville, and Franklin.

== State prisons ==
- Bay State Correctional Center (medium-security)
- Massachusetts Correctional Institution – Cedar Junction (maximum-security; also lies partly across town line in neighboring Walpole)
- Massachusetts Correctional Institution – Norfolk (medium security)
- Pondville Correctional Center (minimum-security)

== See also ==
- Stony Brook Wildlife Sanctuary, Norfolk
