= Charlestown State Prison =

State prison in Boston, Massachusetts

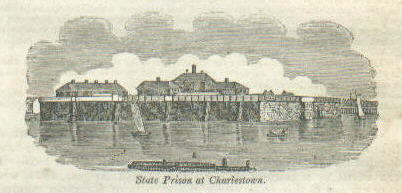
- Charlestown State Prison in 1840
- Interactive map of Charlestown State Prison
- Location: Charlestown, Boston, Massachusetts; 42°22′29.11″N 71°4′3.24″W
- Status: Closed
- Security class: Correctional facility
- Population: 992 (1903)
- Opened: 1805
- Closed: November 1955
- Managed by: Massachusetts Department of Correction

Charlestown State Prison was a correctional facility in Charlestown, Boston, Massachusetts operated by the Massachusetts Department of Correction. The facility was built at Lynde's Point, now at the intersection of Austin Street and New Rutherford Avenue, and in proximity to the Boston and Maine Railroad tracks that intersected with the Eastern Freight Railroad tracks. Bunker Hill Community College occupies the site that the prison once occupied.

In 1803 the Massachusetts General Court passed an act approving the construction of a prison. The prison opened in 1805. In 1828 the construction of a north wing was underway. The construction of the south wing occurred in 1850. In 1853 the Legislature of Massachusetts voted to build a prison to replace Charlestown. The prison's space increased as time passed. By 1867 the state converted a guardroom into hundreds of prison cells. On the morning of April 10, 1873, an Englishman named William Patterson, who was incarcerated for burglary, stabbed a turnkey named John E. Shaw. Shaw's injuries were so severe that he was not expected to live.

Gideon Haynes had fourteen years of service as warden of the prison about the time of the Civil War, and later (in the late 1870s) as superintendent of the Charlestown property when the prison in Concord opened. One of his children, Inez Haynes Irwin, became a noted suffragist, feminist, and writer. The Haynes family lived at 85 Chapman Street, a street that no longer exists.

The new prison, MCI Concord, opened in May 1878. Many prisoners were transferred to the new prison. Governor of Massachusetts George D. Robinson signed a bill ordering prisoners to be moved back to Charlestown on May 21, 1884. In 1886 the west wing, with nearly 60 cells, was built in Charlestown. In 1890 a prisoner named Moore escaped. During the same year "Chicken" Walsh, another prisoner, made an unsuccessful attempt to escape. At a later point a prison riot occurred.

By 1903, of the prisoners at Charlestown, 75 were in life imprisonment, 54 had varying terms, and 863 were held under minimum and maximum sentence forms. In 1920 Charlestown began manufacturing and issuing license plates. The prison closed in November 1955, and prisoners were moved to other facilities.

== Notable prisoners ==
- James Allen
- Warry Charles
- John Patrick Connolly
- Ezra Heywood
- Victor Folke Nelson
- Charles Ponzi
- Jesse Pomeroy
- Malcolm X
- Sacco and Vanzetti
- Norman H. White
