= Massachusetts Treatment Center =

Prison in Massachusetts, United States

- Location in Massachusetts
- Location: 30 Administration Road Bridgewater, Massachusetts; 41°56′42″N 70°57′17″W
- Status: Operational
- Security class: Medium
- Capacity: Operational Capacity: 665 Operational Occupancy: 86%
- Managed by: Massachusetts Department of Correction
- Director: Superintendent Dave Duarte

The Massachusetts Treatment Center is a medium-security secured facility for men, operated by the Massachusetts Department of Correction. The facility is located within the Bridgewater Correctional Complex and houses both state prison inmates convicted of sex crimes and civilly committed persons deemed 'sexually dangerous' by a court of law. This civil commitment process is determined by Massachusetts General Law Chapter 123A Section 14d. On January 6, 2020, there were 572 inmates in general population beds.

The mission of the Massachusetts Treatment Center is to promote public safety through the responsible management of criminal and civil commitments while providing a comprehensive and effective sex offender treatment program.

The facility is adjacent to the state's Old Colony Correctional Center.

== Covid cases ==
Pursuant to the Supreme Judicial Court's April 3, 2020 Opinion and Order in the Committee for Public Counsel Services v. Chief Justice of the Trial Court, SJC-12926 matter, as amended on April 10, April 28 and June 23, 2020 (the “Order”), the Special Master posts weekly reports which are located on the SJC website here for COVID testing and cases for each of the correctional facilities administered by the Department of Correction and each of the county Sheriffs’ offices. The SJC Special master link above has the most up to date information reported by the correctional agencies and is posted for the public to view.

5 inmates have died due to Covid at the Massachusetts treatment center.
