= Lemuel Shattuck Hospital Correctional Unit =

Prison in Massachusetts, United States

- Interactive map of Lemuel Shattuck Hospital Correctional Unit
- Location: Jamaica Plain, Massachusetts, United States; 42°17′59″N 71°06′07″W
- Status: Operational
- Security class: Medium
- Capacity: 24
- Population: 25 (January 2016)
- Opened: 1974
- Managed by: Massachusetts Department of Correction
- Director: Superintendent Michael Devine

The Lemuel Shattuck Hospital Correctional Unit is a 23 bed, medium security facility located on the eighth floor of the Lemuel Shattuck Hospital in Jamaica Plain, Massachusetts. This facility serves as the primary acute medical care facility for inmates in the state prison system. This unit is under the jurisdiction of the Massachusetts Department of Correction.

== History ==
The LSHCU was established in 1974 as a federally funded pilot program to serve as the DOC's acute care medical facility. The unit originally consisted of a seven bed ward on the eighth floor of the hospital. By 1979, the commonwealth took financial control of the facility from the federal government due to the success of the facility. Also by this time, the DOC entered into an agreement with the Massachusetts Department of Public Health to provide medical care to state inmates. In 1982, an out-patient clinic was constructed and in 1987, the last phase of the expansion of the eighth floor was completed. As of 2015, the facility has 23 beds and can also accommodate up to 100 out-patient inmates at any one time.
