= Concord Prison Outreach =

Non-profit organization in Massachusetts, U.S.

Concord Prison Outreach (CPO) is a non-profit organization based in Concord, Massachusetts, and dates back to 1968. The organization is independent, volunteer-driven and maintains an active steering committee and board of directors.

CPO operates with the support of approximately 35 Massachusetts faith-based organizations, as well as with the support of individuals from around the state. At any given point in time the organization maintains over 100 working volunteers in the Massachusetts' prisons. The organization is considered the largest of its kind in Massachusetts.

CPO reports their programs are meant to challenge, change and improve the lives of the participants. The organization's list of program offerings includes:

- Anger management,
- Personal and emotional improvement,
- Basic adult education and high school equivalency,
- ESL,
- Managing money,
- Parenting groups,
- the "Read to me, Daddy" program,
- Library services,
- Computer skills,
- Art for the community,
- Job search skills,
- Re-entry support,
- Writing skills,
- Book discussion groups,
- Math for college placement,
- book drives for children of inmates,
- and other outreach projects.

The details of CPO's origins can be read in the interview given by Jean Bell and Diana Clymer to Renee Garrelick, for the Concord oral history program. They talk extensively about the beginnings of the program, the changes happening, and the initial reaction to computer and calligraphy classes for inmates that soon grew to nine teachers working with 400 inmates at the Concord prison. Over the past 30 years these programs have continued to develop and offer life skills for inmates at Concord and other prisons in the area. Author Robin Casarjian's book Houses of Healing is required reading for one of the program's courses dealing with coping strategies and stress management .

The organization has a collaborative relationship with the Massachusetts "Alternatives to Violence Program". CPO also has a long-standing working relationship with the administration of the Massachusetts Department of Corrections, though both organizations remain operationally independent of each other.

Administratively the organization runs with the help of a paid executive director who answers to the board of directors. Representatives from member churches and synagogues make up the organization's steering committee. CPO maintains offices in West Concord, Massachusetts. Financially, the organization has maintained a strong balance sheet through donations from its member churches and synagogues, endowments and from individual contributors.

== See also ==
- Concord Prison Experiment
