= Pondville Correctional Center =

Prison in Massachusetts, United States

- Location in Massachusetts
- Location: Norfolk, Massachusetts; 42°06′31″N 71°17′34″W
- Status: Operational
- Security class: Minimum/ Pre-Release
- Capacity: Operational Capacity: 204 Operational Occupancy: 74%
- Managed by: Massachusetts Department of Correction
- Director: Superintendent Sergio Servello

The Pondville Correctional Center is a minimum security/pre-release Massachusetts state prison. It is located 36 miles southwest of Boston, Massachusetts in the town of Norfolk, Massachusetts. Because this is a minimum security facility, there are no walls or fences to keep prisoners in. Security is maintained by inmate counts and strict accountability procedures. On January 6, 2020, there were 151 inmates in general population beds.

== Accreditation ==
This facility was re-accredited by the American Correctional Association (ACA) signifying and adherence to national standards. In May 2003, PCC was also re-accredited by the National Commission on Correctional Health Care(NCCHC), in conjunction with its privatized medical services.

== Prison Address ==
Pondville Correctional Center
PO Box 146
Norfolk, MA 02056
