= Old Colony Correctional Center =

Prison in Massachusetts, USA

Coordinates: 41°56′43.31″N 70°56′59.37″W

- Interactive map of Old Colony Correctional Center
- Location: Bridgewater, Massachusetts
- Status: Operational
- Capacity: Operational Capacity Med: 597 Operational Occupancy Med: 93% Operational Capacity Min: 160 Operational Occupancy Min: 66%
- Opened: 1987
- Closed: N/A
- Managed by: Massachusetts Department of Correction
- Director: Superintendent Steve Kennedy

Old Colony Correctional Center is a Massachusetts Department of Correction men's prison in Bridgewater, Massachusetts. The medium security facility is located in a 30-acre (12 ha) plot of land in the Bridgewater Correctional Complex with the Bridgewater State Hospital and the Massachusetts Treatment Center. Old Colony Correctional Center Minimum Unit is under the authority of the correctional center. As of January 6, 2020 there were 553 medium and 106 minimum inmates in general population beds.

== COVID Cases ==
Pursuant to the Supreme Judicial Court's April 3, 2020 Opinion and Order in the Committee for Public Counsel Services v. Chief Justice of the Trial Court, SJC-12926 matter, as amended on April 10, April 28 and June 23, 2020 (the “Order”), the Special Master posts weekly reports which are located on the SJC website here for COVID testing and cases for each of the correctional facilities administered by the Department of Correction and each of the county Sheriffs’ offices. The SJC Special master link above has the most up to date information reported by the correctional agencies and is posted for the public to view.

== Notable inmates ==
- Neil Entwistle - sentenced for the double murder of his baby daughter, Lillian Rose and wife, Rachel; he was transferred there on December 17, 2008, after receiving death threats at the Souza-Baranowski Correctional Center
- Michael M. McDermott, who murdered seven of his coworkers in the 2000 "Wakefield massacre"
- Orion Krause - Murdered his mother, grandparents, and a caregiver.
- Paul Shanley - Priest who was accused and found guilty of raping a male minor. Sentenced to 12 to 15 years. Shanley died in 2020.
- Lewis Lent - Murdered two children in New York and Massachusetts.
