= South Middlesex Correctional Center =

Women's prison in Framingham, Massachusetts, United States

South Middlesex Correctional Center (SMCC)
- Location in Massachusetts
- Location: Framingham, Massachusetts; 42°16′01″N 71°24′25″W
- Status: Closed
- Security class: Minimum/Pre-Release
- Capacity: Operational Capacity: 185 Operational Occupancy: 34%
- Opened: 1976
- Managed by: Massachusetts Department of Correction
- Director: Superintendent Kristie Ladouceur

The South Middlesex Correctional Center (SMCC) is a small, minimum security/pre-release state prison for women located in Framingham, Massachusetts. The prison opened in 1976, originally as a part of MCI-Framingham. Today, it is its own facility specifically for women. Most, if not all inmates work in the community during the day for an average wage of $7/day. Many work in fast food restaurants, as janitors, carpenters, or painters. On January 6, 2020, there was 63 inmates in general population beds. The facility was closed in 2021.

== Facility description ==
SMCC consists of one large three-story building with a basement. The first floor is used for administrative offices, while the second and third floors are used as inmate living areas. Most rooms are double-occupancy while some house more than two women. As a minimum security/pre-release facility, SMCC is not within a secure perimeter and there are no lock-in cells. The facility is supervised and managed by the Massachusetts Department of Correction.

== Covid cases ==
Pursuant to the Supreme Judicial Court's April 3, 2020 Opinion and Order in the Committee for Public Counsel Services v. Chief Justice of the Trial Court, SJC-12926 matter, as amended on April 10, April 28 and June 23, 2020 (the “Order”), the Special Master posts weekly reports which are located on the SJC website here for COVID testing and cases for each of the correctional facilities administered by the Department of Correction and each of the county Sheriffs’ offices. The SJC Special Master link above has the most up to date information reported by the correctional agencies and is posted for the public to view.
