= Middlesex Jail and House of Correction =

Jail in Billerica, Massachusetts

Coordinates: 42.5554593°N 71.3037852°W

- Interactive map of Middlesex Jail and House of Correction
- Location: Billerica, Massachusetts, United States
- Status: Operational
- Opened: 1931
- Managed by: Middlesex Sheriff's Office
- Director: Michael P. Mahoney
- Warden: Amoroso Cefalo
- Website: https://www.middlesexsheriff.org/35/Jail-House-of-Correction

Located in Billerica, Massachusetts The Middlesex Jail and House of Correction serves Middlesex County, Massachusetts. Men are housed here awaiting trial or serving sentences up to 2 ½ years. The jail also houses women classified to the Middlesex Sheriff's pre-release center

== History ==
Originally built on a 350-acre farm in Billerica, Massachusetts, the facility was to replace a condemned jail 15 miles away in East Cambridge, Massachusetts. The facility originally could hold over 300 prisoners, cost $837,000 to build, and was completed in December 1931.

On December 9, 2024, the Middlesex Sheriff's Office installed a free vending machine filled with Naloxone inside of the facility's visitor center. Within the first year of operation the machine was used 205 times.
