= Massachusetts Correctional Institution – Norfolk =

Prison in Norfolk, Massachusetts

Massachusetts Correctional Institution—Norfolk
- Location in Massachusetts
- Location: Norfolk, Massachusetts; 42°07′09″N 71°18′15″W
- Status: Operational
- Security class: Medium
- Capacity: Operational Capacity: 1,473 Operational Occupancy: 85%
- Opened: 1927
- Managed by: Massachusetts Department of Correction
- Director: Superintendent Nelson Alves

Massachusetts Correctional Institution at Norfolk, or MCI-Norfolk, is an American medium security prison in Norfolk, Massachusetts under the jurisdiction of the Massachusetts Department of Correction. Though it is rated medium security, it also houses up to 98 maximum security inmates. Opened in the early 1930s, MCI-Norfolk is the largest state prison in Massachusetts. On January 6, 2020, there were 1,251 inmates in general population beds.

One of the notable inmates of MCI-Norfolk was Malcolm X, who was also a member of the Norfolk Debating Society while incarcerated.

== History ==
MCI-Norfolk was founded in 1927 as the Norfolk Prison Colony, a "model prison community" conceived by sociologist and penologist Howard Belding Gill (Harvard 1913, M.B.A. 1914), who was appointed its first superintendent in 1931.

Gill was dismissed in 1934 after an escape by four inmates, and replaced by his deputy Maurice N. Winslow, who served as superintendent from 1934 to 1950. The name of the prison was changed to the Massachusetts Correctional Institution at Norfolk in the mid-1950s.

Famous civil rights activist Malcolm X was incarcerated at Norfolk, and he attended the prison school, where he furthered his education beyond the eighth grade. The prison school and library are where he picked up his love of reading and where he learned how to articulate and debate his points in an argument, as he was part of the Norfolk Debating Society. He has even stated that he began his education here by copying down an entire dictionary word for word, learning the words and refining his handwriting the whole time.

During the 1950s, the Norfolk Debating Society, a team consisting of prison inmates, beat a number of university teams including the Oxford Union at Oxford University.

A fraternity of lay Dominicans, some of whom have made their final profession in the order, has been formed through Sister Ruth Raichle, the Catholic chaplain in Norfolk.

== Officer deaths at Norfolk ==
On July 31, 1972, Corrections Officers Alfred Baranowski and James Souza were shot and killed by an inmate using a smuggled firearm during an escape attempt. In the officers' memory, the Department of Corrections named their new supermax prison the Souza-Baranowski Correctional Center in Shirley, Massachusetts.

== COVID-19 cases ==
Pursuant to the Supreme Judicial Court's April 3, 2020 Opinion and Order in the Committee for Public Counsel Services v. Chief Justice of the Trial Court, SJC-12926 matter, as amended on April 10, April 28 and June 23, 2020 (the “Order”), the Special Master posts weekly reports which are located on the SJC website here for COVID testing and cases for each of the correctional facilities administered by the Department of Correction and each of the county Sheriffs’ offices. The SJC Special master link above has the most up to date information reported by the correctional agencies and is posted for the public to view.

On December 4, 2020, a prisoner at MCI-Norfolk died from complications of COVID-19. On the day of his death, there were 41 prisoners reported with active cases.

== Prison Address ==
MCI-Norfolk
2 Clark Street
PO Box 43
Norfolk, MA 02056
