= Northeastern Correctional Center =

Prison in Massachusetts, United States

- Location in Massachusetts
- Location: Barretts Mill Road West Concord, Massachusetts; 42°28′18″N 71°23′48″W
- Status: Operational
- Security class: Minimum/Pre-Release
- Capacity: Operational Capacity: 277 Operational Occupancy: 68%
- Opened: 1932
- Managed by: Massachusetts Department of Correction
- Director: Deputy Superintendent Sheila Kelly

The Northeastern Correctional Center (NCC) is a minimum security/pre-release state prison located in Concord, Massachusetts. NCC opened in 1932, sits on 300 acres of farmland, and houses 189 adult male prisoners as of December 30, 2024. The prison provides many inmates with work opportunities prior to being released from detention, including cooking and serving at the Fife and Drum Restaurant.

Northeastern Correctional Center has been accredited by the American Correctional Association (ACA) since 1982. It is managed by the Massachusetts Department of Correction and overseen by the Massachusetts Department of Public Safety.
