= Massachusetts Department of Correction =

Corrections department of Massachusetts, US

- Abbreviation: MADOC

Agency overview
- Formed: 1919
- Employees: 4,800
- Annual budget: $750 Million

Jurisdictional structure
- Operations jurisdiction: Massachusetts, USA
- Map of Massachusetts Department of Correction's jurisdiction
- Area: 7,840 square miles (20,300 km^{2})
- Population: 6,587,536 (2011 est.)
- Legal jurisdiction: Commonwealth of Massachusetts
- General nature: Civilian police

Operational structure
- Headquarters: Milford, Massachusetts
- Correction Officers: 3,200
- Civilians: 1,200
- Agency executives: Shawn Jenkins, Commissioner; Christopher Nichols, Deputy Commissioner of Prison Division; Mitzi Peterson, Deputy Commissioner of Clinical Services and Reentry; Thomas Preston, Deputy Commissioner of Administration; Vacant, Chief of Staff; Nelson Alves, Deputy Chief of Staff
- Parent agency: Executive Office of Public Safety and Security
- Specialized Teams: Tactical Response Team (TRT) Special Response Team (SRT) Tactical Reaction Team (TRT) Hostage Negotiations Team (HNT) High Risk Transportation (HRT) Central Transportation Unit (CTU) K9 Team Inner Perimeter Security (IPS) Radio Communications Unit Honor Guard Unit Firearms Unit Gang Intelligence Unit Fugitive Apprehension Unit Office of Investigative Services (OIS) Communications Division

Facilities
- State Prisons: 13
- Vehicles: Ford E-Series Van
- K9 Teams: Retriever German Shepherd

Website
- http://www.mass.gov/doc

The Massachusetts Department of Correction is the government agency responsible for operating the prison system of the Commonwealth of Massachusetts in the United States. The Massachusetts Department of Correction is responsible for the custody of about 8,292 prisoners (as of January 2020) throughout 13 correctional facilities and is the 5th largest state agency in the state of Massachusetts, employing over 4,800 people (about 3,200 of whom are sworn correctional officers). The Massachusetts Department of Correction also has a fugitive apprehension unit, a gang intelligence unit, a K9 Unit, a Special Reaction Team (SRT), and a Tactical Response Team (TRT). Both of these tactical units are highly trained and are paramilitary in nature. The agency is headquartered in Milford, Massachusetts and currently headed by Commissioner Shawn Jenkins.

== Mission statement ==
The Massachusetts Department of Correction's mission is to promote public safety by incarcerating offenders while providing opportunities for participation in effective programming designed to reduce recidivism.

== Officer rank structure ==
Only the ranks of Captain and below wear uniforms, the ranks and insignia are as shown below.

Title	Insignia
Commissioner	
Deputy Commissioner	
Assistant Deputy Commissioner	
Superintendent	
Deputy Superintendent	
Director	
Deputy Director	
Captain	
Lieutenant	
Sergeant	
Correction Officer	

== Correctional facilities ==
See List of Massachusetts state correctional facilities

== Security levels ==
The following security levels are utilized by the Massachusetts Department of Correction.

- Maximum Facility: Souza-Baranowski Correctional Center.
- Medium Facilities: Old Colony Correctional Center, Bridgewater State Hospital, Massachusetts Treatment Center, Massachusetts Correctional Institution - Norfolk, North Central Correctional Institution, Lemuel Shattuck Hospital Correctional Unit, Massachusetts Correctional Institution - Framingham, and Massachusetts Correctional Institution - Shirley.
- Minimum Facilities: Massachusetts Alcohol, Substance Abuse Center at Plymouth - Plymouth, Boston Pre-Release Center, Northeastern Correctional Center, Pondville Correctional Center, South Middlesex Correctional Center.
- Pre-Release Facilities: Boston Pre-Release Center, Northeastern Correctional Center, Pondville Correctional Center, South Middlesex Correctional Center.

== Prison overcrowding rates ==
The total operational occupancy for DOC facilities as of January 6, 2020 was 72%. Operational capacity, according to the Association of State Correctional Administrators (ASCA), is the number of beds authorized for safe and efficient operation of the facility. It does not include beds reserved for discipline, investigations, infirmary or other temporary holds for special purposes. The total design occupancy for DOC facilities as of 1st quarter 2020 was 101%. Design capacity is the number of inmates that planners or architects intended for the institution [as defined by the U.S. Department of Justice, Bureau of Justice Statistics (BJS)]. Rated capacity is the number of beds or inmates assigned by a rating official to institutions within the jurisdiction, essentially formally updated from the original design capacity.

== Prison COVID-19 testing and cases ==
Pursuant to the Supreme Judicial Court's April 3, 2020 Opinion and Order in the Committee for Public Counsel Services v. Chief Justice of the Trial Court, SJC-12926 matter, as amended on April 10, April 28 and June 23, 2020 (the “Order”), the Special Master posts weekly reports which are located on the SJC website here for COVID testing and cases for each of the correctional facilities administered by the Department of Correction and each of the county Sheriffs’ offices. The SJC Special master link above has the most up to date information reported by the correctional agencies and is posted for the public to view.

== Prisoner demographics ==
MA DOC Jurisdiction Population by Race/Ethnicity on January 1, 2020.

- White (3,502) - 42%
- Black (2,326) - 28%
- Hispanic (2,192) - 26%
- Asian (120) - 1%
- Native American/Alaskan (48) - 1%
- Pacific Islander (1) - 1%
- Other (103) - 1.0%

MA DOC Jurisdiction Population by Gender on January 1, 2020.

- Male (7,988) - 96%
- Female (304) - 4%

== Correction Officer Training Academy ==
The Department of Correction's training is conducted at the Department Headquarters located in Milford, MA. The academy consists of 10–12 weeks of paramilitary type training for new correction officer recruits. (The academy also trains Correctional Program Officers (CPO), Industrial Instructors, Recreation Officers, Correctional Cooks). Recruits are taught the policies and procedures of the department, self-defense, firearms use, proper handcuffing and restraint techniques, proper emergency vehicle operations, suicide prevention, security operations, and many other topics. Once a recruit completes the academy he or she is sworn in as a Massachusetts State Correction Officer and is assigned to one of the state's sixteen correctional facilities to be further trained by a Field Training Officer (FTO). The field training program is similar to the type of training police departments use to train new police officers.

== Fallen officers ==
Since the establishment of the Massachusetts Department of Correction, 14 officers have died in the line of duty. The most recent line of duty death was in 1998 at MCI-Shirley.

== Inmate suicide ==
The suicide rates among people locked up in Massachusetts has been among the highest in the nation. A 2020 report from the US Department of Justice concluded there is "reasonable cause to believe that MDOC has engaged in a pattern or practice of resistance to rights protected by the Eighth Amendment because it fails to provide constitutionally adequate supervision and mental health care to prisoners in mental health crisis and places them in mental health watch for prolonged periods of time under restrictive housing conditions that violate their constitutional rights."

== See also ==
- List of law enforcement agencies in Massachusetts
- List of United States state correction agencies
- Massachusetts Department of Youth Services
- Concord Prison Outreach (Private not-for-profit organization)
- Prison–industrial complex
- Incarceration in the United States
- Prison abolition movement
