= List of American sportswriters =

The following is a list of notable American sportswriters who worked for the sports departments of their respective newspapers.

== Historical sportswriters ==
- Bob Addie
- Les Biederman
- Furman Bisher
- Jimmy Cannon
- Henry Chadwick
- Bill Corum
- Adeline Daley
- George W. Daley
- Dan Daniel
- Pierce Egan
- Charley Feeney
- Larry Felser
- Otto Floto
- Mary Garber
- Idah McGlone Gibson
- Halsey Hall
- Arnold Hano
- Sid Hartman
- W. C. Heinz
- Zander Hollander
- Jerome Holtzman
- James Jerpe
- Leonard Koppett
- Sam Lacy
- John Lardner
- Ring Lardner
- Cary B. Lewis
- Fred Lieb
- Tim Murnane
- Jack Murphy
- Jimmy Murphy
- Bill Nunn
- Murray Olderman
- Baz O'Meara
- Edwin Pope
- Shirley Povich
- Rud Rennie
- Grantland Rice
- Edwin Rumill
- Damon Runyon
- Red Smith
- Lillian Vickers-Smith
- Steve Wilstein
- Dick Young

== By publications ==
=== Atlanta Journal-Constitution ===
- Tony Barnhart
- Craig Custance
- D. Orlando Ledbetter
- Terence Moore
- Steve Wyche

=== Baltimore Sun ===
- Eunetta T. Boone
- Peter Schmuck

=== Boston Globe ===
- Amalie Benjamin
- Jackie MacMullan
- Bob Ryan
- Dan Shaughnessy

=== Boston Herald ===
- Steve Buckley
- Gerry Callahan
- Tony Massarotti

=== Chicago Sun-Times ===
- Rick Telander

=== Chicago Tribune ===
- David Haugh

=== The Plain Dealer (Cleveland, Ohio) ===
- Terry Pluto

=== The Dallas Morning News ===
- Tim Cowlishaw

=== The Dayton Daily News ===
- Hal McCoy

=== The Denver Post ===
- Jim Armstrong
- Dick Connor
- Woody Paige

=== Detroit Free Press ===
- Mitch Albom

=== Detroit News ===
- Terry Foster
- Jerry Green
- Bob Wojnowski

=== Fort Worth Star-Telegram ===
- Randy Galloway

=== The Fresno Bee ===
- John Canzano

=== Green Bay Press-Gazette ===
- Pete Dougherty

=== Newsday ===
- Alan Hahn

=== Los Angeles Times ===
- Bill Christine
- Bill Dwyre
- Helene Elliott
- Frank Finch
- Jim Murray

=== Louisville Courier-Journal ===
- Tim Sullivan

=== Miami Herald ===
- Judy Battista
- Michelle Kaufman
- Dan Le Batard
- Edwin Pope

=== Milwaukee Journal Sentinel ===
- Drew Olson

=== Minneapolis Star Tribune ===
- Dick Gordon
- Sid Hartman
- Patrick Reusse
- Jim Souhan

=== New York Daily News ===
- Mike Lupica
- Bill Madden
- Sherry Ross
- Dick Young

=== New York Post ===
- Milton Gross
- Phil Mushnick
- Steve Serby
- Joel Sherman
- Mike Vaccaro
- Peter Vecsey

=== The New York Times ===
- Dave Anderson
- Karen Crouse
- Robin Herman
- Bill Pennington
- William C. Rhoden
- Richard Sandomir
- Claire Smith
- George Vecsey

=== The Oakland Press ===
- Pat Caputo

=== Oakland Tribune ===
- Art Spander

=== The Oregonian ===
- John Canzano

=== Philadelphia Daily News ===
- Paul Hagen
- Phil Jasner

=== Pittsburgh Post-Gazette ===
- Al Abrams
- Mark Madden
- Stan Savran
- Bob Smizik

=== San Antonio Express-News ===
- Dan Cook

=== San Francisco Chronicle ===
- Ann Killion
- Gwen Knapp
- Ray Ratto
- Susan Slusser
- Tom Stienstra

=== San Jose Mercury News ===
- Howard Bryant
- John Canzano
- Tim Cowlishaw
- Tim Kawakami

=== Sports Illustrated ===
- Walter Bingham
- Roy Blount Jr.
- Robert H. Boyle
- Robert Creamer
- Frank Deford
- George Dohrmann
- Michael Farber
- Ron Fimrite
- Pat Forde
- Peter Gammons
- Dick Gordon
- Karl Taro Greenfeld
- Jon Heyman
- Ed Hinton
- Richard Hoffer
- Dan Jenkins
- Sally Jenkins
- Robert F. Jones
- Larry F. Keith
- Armen Keteyian
- Franz Lidz
- Melissa Ludtke
- Jackie MacMullan
- Ivan Maisel
- Stewart Mandel
- Arash Markazi
- Tex Maule
- Jack McCallum
- Leo Monahan
- Leigh Montville
- Kenny Moore
- Mark Mulvoy
- Jim Murray
- William Nack
- Jack Olsen
- Dan Patrick
- Jeff Pearlman
- George Plimpton
- Joe Posnanski
- Rick Reilly
- Selena Roberts
- Steve Rushin
- Budd Schulberg
- Bud Shrake
- Michael Silver
- Gary Smith
- Shelley Smith
- Rick Telander
- Whitney Tower
- John Underwood
- Tom Verducci
- Kurt Vonnegut
- Grant Wahl
- Jon Wertheim
- Ralph Wiley
- Herbert Warren Wind
- Alexander Wolff
- Steve Wulf
- Don Yaeger
- Peter King
- Paul Zimmerman

=== St. Louis Post-Dispatch ===
- Bob Broeg
- Rick Hummel
- Bernie Miklasz

=== St. Paul Pioneer Press ===
- Dick Gordon
- Don Riley
- Charley Walters

=== USA Today ===
- Christine Brennan
- Nancy Armour

=== The Washington Post ===
- Thomas Boswell
- Liz Clarke
- Jennifer Frey
- Sally Jenkins
- Tony Kornheiser
- Jane Leavy
- Michael Wilbon
- Mike Wise

=== Miscellaneous ===
- Patricia Babcock-McGraw, sportswriter for the Daily Herald
- Katherine Dunn, novelist who covered boxing for the Willamette Week, The Oregonian, and The New York Times

== American women sportswriters ==
- Kate Fagan
- Cynthia Frelund
- Jennifer Frey
- Mary Garber
- Carrie Gerlach Cecil
- Jean Giambrone
- Jane Gross
- Maggie Hathaway
- Jemele Hill
- Sally Jenkins
- Christina Kahrl
- Mina Kimes
- Sarah Langs
- Marjorie Herrera Lewis
- Alison Lukan
- Jackie MacMullan
- Myra MacPherson
- Juliet Macur
- Sadie Kneller Miller
- Marie Millikan
- Rachel Nichols
- Lisa Olson
- Maureen Orcutt
- Molly Qerim
- Marly Rivera
- Alanna Rizzo
- Selena Roberts
- Sherry Ross
- Holly Rowe
- Jen Royle
- Lisa Nehus Saxon
- Nell Scovell
- Mary Shane
- Ramona Shelburne
- Shelley Smith
- Sage Steele
- Karintha Styles
- Lou Swarz
- Maribel Vinson
- Lesley Visser
- Charean Williams
- Joan Wulff
- Ina Eloise Young
- Ellen Zavian

== See also ==
- List of American writers
  - List of American print journalists
