= Bill Nunn Memorial Award =

American football sportswriting award

- Sport: American football
- Awarded for: "In recognition of long and distinguished reporting in the field of pro football."
- Location: Pro Football Hall of Fame; Canton, Ohio
- Presented by: Professional Football Writers of America (PFWA)

History
- First award: 1969
- Most recent: Mary Kay Cabot (2025)
- Website: Official website

The Bill Nunn Memorial Award is bestowed annually by the Professional Football Writers of America (PFWA) to a reporter for their "long and distinguished contribution to pro football through coverage". It is named after Bill Nunn Jr., who worked for 22 years at the Pittsburgh Courier.

The award was created in 1969 and was originally named the Dick McCann Memorial Award, after Dick McCann, the first director of the Pro Football Hall of Fame. The name was changed in 2021 due to McCann's association with the segregationist policies of the Washington Redskins when he was the team's general manager.

The award is presented annually at the Pro Football Hall Enshrinement Ceremony. Prior to 2014, the presentation was made at the Enshrinees Dinner. While the list of Nunn Award honorees is sometimes referred to as the "writer's wing" of the Hall of Fame, they are not actually Hall of Famers, do not receive gold jackets or bronze busts, and as of 2025, none of the Nunn Award winners have been inducted.

== Award recipients ==
| Year | Awardee | Publication |
|---|---|---|
| 1969 | George Strickler | Chicago Tribune |
| 1970 | Arthur Daley | The New York Times |
| 1971 | Joe King | New York World-Telegram and Sun |
| 1972 | Lewis Atchison | Washington Star |
| 1973 | Dave Brady | The Washington Post |
| 1974 | Bob Oates | Los Angeles Times |
| 1975 | John Steadman | Baltimore News-American |
| 1976 | Jack Hand | Associated Press |
| 1977 | Art Daley | Green Bay Press-Gazette |
| 1978 | Murray Olderman | Newspaper Enterprise Association |
| 1979 | Pat Livingston | Pittsburgh Press |
| 1980 | Chuck Heaton | Cleveland Plain Dealer |
| 1981 | Norm Miller | New York Daily News |
| 1982 | Cameron Snyder | Baltimore Morning Sun |
| 1983 | Hugh Brown | Philadelphia Bulletin |
| 1984 | Larry Felser | Buffalo News |
| 1985 | Cooper Rollow | Chicago Tribune |
| 1986 | Bill Wallace | The New York Times |
| 1987 | Jerry Magee | San Diego Union |
| 1988 | Gordon Forbes | USA Today |
| 1989 | Vito Stellino | The Baltimore Sun |
| 1990 | Will McDonough | The Boston Globe |
| 1991 | Dick Connor | Denver Post |
| 1992 | Frank Luksa | Dallas Morning News |
| 1993 | Ira Miller | San Francisco Chronicle |
| 1994 | Don Pierson | Chicago Tribune |
| 1995 | Ray Didinger | Philadelphia Daily News |
| 1996 | Paul Zimmerman | Sports Illustrated |
| 1997 | Bob Roesler | New Orleans Times-Picayune |
| 1998 | Dave Anderson | The New York Times |
| 1999 | Art Spander | Oakland Tribune |
| 2000 | Tom McEwen | Tampa Tribune |
| 2001 | Len Shapiro | The Washington Post |
| 2002 | Edwin Pope | Miami Herald |
| 2003 | Joel Buchsbaum | Pro Football Weekly |
| 2004 | Rick Gosselin | Dallas Morning News |
| 2005 | Jerry Green | Detroit News |
| 2006 | John McClain | Houston Chronicle |
| 2007 | John Clayton | ESPN.com |
| 2008 | Len Pasquarelli | ESPN.com |
| 2009 | Peter King | Sports Illustrated |
| 2010 | Pete Finney | New Orleans Times-Picayune |
| 2011 | Bob McGinn | Milwaukee Journal-Sentinel |
| 2012 | Tom Kowalski | MLive.com |
| 2013 | Dan Pompei | Chicago Tribune |
| 2014 | Ed Bouchette | Pittsburgh Post-Gazette |
| 2015 | Dave Goldberg | Associated Press |
| 2016 | Chris Mortensen | ESPN.com |
| 2017 | Ed Werder | ESPN.com |
| 2018 | Charean Williams | Pro Football Talk |
| 2019 | Sam Farmer | Los Angeles Times |
| 2020 | Don Banks | Sports Illustrated |
| 2021 | Bob Glauber | Newsday |
| 2022 | Jarrett Bell | USA Today |
| 2023 | Jim Trotter | The Athletic |
| 2024 | D. Orlando Ledbetter | Atlanta Journal-Constitution |
| 2025 | Mary Kay Cabot | Cleveland Plain Dealer, Cleveland.com |
| 2026 | Barry Wilner | The Associated Press |

== See also ==
- BBWAA Career Excellence Award - Baseball Hall of Fame's comparative award (Baseball Writers' Association of America)
- Pete Rozelle Radio-Television Award
