= Stan Hochman =

American sportswriter

- Born: October 15, 1928; Brooklyn, New York, U.S.
- Died: April 9, 2015 (aged 86); Bryn Mawr, Pennsylvania, U.S.
- Resting place: Har Nebo Cemetery
- Occupation: Sportswriter
- Years active: 1950s–2015
- Employer: Philadelphia Daily News
- Known for: Coverage of the Philadelphia Phillies; Hall of Fame voter
- Spouse: Gloria Hochman
- Children: 1

Stan Hochman (October 15, 1928 – April 9, 2015) was an American sportswriter who covered the Philadelphia Phillies for the Philadelphia Daily News. He was a voting member of the Baseball Writers' Association of America (BBWAA), whose main task is to vote on candidates for induction into the National Baseball Hall of Fame. Other newspapers Hochman worked for include the Brownsville Herald, Corpus Christi Caller-Times, Waco News-Tribune, and San Bernardino Sun.

== Early life ==
Hochman was born on October 15, 1928, in Brooklyn, New York. He attended New York University, where he earned his bachelor's degree in 1948, and his master's degree in 1949. He served in the U.S. Army from 1951 to 1953. Hochman's career at the Daily News began on June 9, 1959, and he spent 55 years covering not just the Phillies, but everything sports, in what was to be his adopted hometown — and the town loved him back for it.

== Philadelphia ==
Pro Football Hall of Fame writer Ray Didinger, himself a onetime Daily News sportswriter and former sports-talk cohost with Hochman on WIP in Philadelphia, said of Hochman, "There have been a lot of greats who have worked at the Daily News, but if you were going to pick the single byline that most people will associate with the Daily News forever, it's probably Stan." In addition to being a voting member for baseball's hall of fame and writing on all Philadelphia sports, among other things Hochman received awards for his writing on boxing, horse racing, football, and college basketball. Twenty-one year Daily News editor-in-chief Zack Stalberg said Hochman "was the finest all-around sports journalist Philadelphia has ever seen." He was also considered the wise man of Philadelphia sports talk radio in the 2010s.

Hochman was a strong advocate for Philadelphia-based heavyweight boxing champion Joe Frazier. He defended Frazier's merits and qualities in comparison to his most storied opponent, Muhammad Ali, and advocated that the city fully recognize and honor Frazier and his accomplishments. Hochman once observed that the city had never honored Frazier, but "Somehow they found a place for a hokey sculpture of Rocky Balboa, a fictional palooka." He later repeated to the New York Times that there was a movie prop statue next to Philadelphia's Art Museum, "but nothing to honor a legitimate heavyweight champion who came out of Philadelphia..." A year later the city committed to a statue honoring Frazier. Ironically, Hochman appeared in the movie Rocky V as a sportswriter.

Early in his Philadelphia career, in addition to writing for the Daily News, Hochman did radio commentary for WCAU in the 1960s, was a weekend television sports anchor at WPVI-TV for three years, and was part of the radio coverage team for the Philadelphia Eagles in 1965. During his television stint, Hochman also hosted a program, On Camera, interviewing guests unrelated to sports.

== Author ==
He authored or co-authored several books. Among these are a 1983 children's biography of the Phillies' hall of fame third baseman Mike Schmidt, Mike Schmidt: Baseball's King of Swing; the 1994 book, The Sports Book : Everything You Need to Be a Fan in Philadelphia; the 2012 book, Unmasked: Bernie Parent and the Broad Street Bullies (co-author); and the 1994 autobiography of Max Patkin's life, The Clown Prince of Baseball (co-author). Patkin was also a member of the Philadelphia Jewish Sports Hall of Fame with Hochman. In 2019, Hochman's wife of 55 years, Gloria Hochman, wrote the book Stan Hochman Unfiltered: 50 Years of Wit and Wisdom from the Groundbreaking Sportswriter.

== Death ==
Hochman died on April 9, 2015, in Bryn Mawr, Pennsylvania. Hochman was interred at Har Nebo Cemetery.

== Awards and honors ==
Hochman has received the following awards and honors, among others;

- Inducted into the Big Five Hall of Fame (2015)
- Inducted into the Pennsylvania Boxing Hall of Fame (2014)
- Inducted into the Philadelphia Sports Hall of Fame (2008)
- Inducted into the Philadelphia Jewish Sports Hall of Fame (2002)
- Received the National Headliner Award for a series he wrote on Negro League Baseball
- Received Nat Fleischer Award from Boxing Writers' Association of America (1991)
- He was among four winners of the 1991 Professional Football Writers of America football writing contest (along with Frank Litsky, Bob McGinn, and Bob Glauber)
- Four-time recipient of the Red Smith Trophy for coverage of the Kentucky Derby
- Three-time Pennsylvania sportswriter of the year (1967, 1985, 1987)
- Since 2016, the Philadelphia Sports Writers Association annually has presented the Stan Hochman Award for excellence in sports writing
