= Keepers of the Streak =

- Directed by: Neil Leifer
- Starring: John Biever; Walter Iooss; Mickey Palmer; Tony Tomsic
- Narrated by: Kevin Conway
- Music by: Brian Keane
- Country of origin: United States
- Original language: English

Production
- Producers: Neil Leifer, Daniel Cohen
- Editor: Anne Fratto
- Production companies: ESPN Films; NFL Films

Original release
- Network: ESPN
- Release: January 23, 2015

Keepers of the Streak is a documentary by ESPN Films that focuses on four photographers who have attended and photographed the first forty-eight Super Bowl games from 1967 to 2014. John Biever, Walter Iooss, Mickey Palmer and Tony Tomsic are the focus of the film, and have their stories told throughout. It is directed by Neil Leifer.

== Overview ==
The film opens with a photo of John Biever, Walter Iooss, Mickey Palmer and Tony Tomsic meeting in the Los Angeles Memorial Coliseum in 1967 right before Super Bowl I. The film goes on to discuss how each man got into the photography business, and centers around their work during Super Bowl XLVIII. It also talks about multiple near misses for members of the group, including Palmer checking himself out of a hospital after a heart attack, right before Super Bowl X. At the time of the release of the film, three of the four men were in their seventies, and a fourth was well into his sixties.

== Production ==
According to director Neil Leifer, he aimed to show how hard it was to film the game, stating,

And I probably didn't succeed in one thing that I wanted to do. I wanted to show how difficult it is to do what these guys do ... If I could re-edit it I would probably make that point, even just to show what it's like to go from the hotel to the stadium. But that doesn't make a good story.

He added that he remembered what it was like to miss Super Bowl XIII after shooting the first twelve, and marveling how the photographers did it every single game.

== Reception ==
Richard Deitsch of Sports Illustrated states that the film (erroneously called "Keepers of the Flame" in his review) provides a good look at the past. He points out that the original AFL–NFL Championship game had 338 press passes handed out—of which 75% went to print media personnel—compared to over 6,000 today. He also mentions that the film shows how the original Super Bowls were played during daytime, and were not the massive events that they are today.

== See also ==
- List of American football films
- Never Miss a Super Bowl Club – a group of fans who have attended every Super Bowl
