= Pro Football Writers of America =

NFL writers association

- Abbreviation: PFWA
- Formation: December 28, 1963; 62 years ago
- Founded at: Chicago
- President: Calvin Watkins
- Website: www.profootballwriters.org

The Pro Football Writers of America (PFWA), sometimes known as Pro Football Writers Association, is an organization that purports to be "[the] official voice of pro football writers, promoting and fighting for access to NFL personnel to best serve the public." Goals of the organization include improving access to practices and locker rooms, developing working relationships with all teams, and ensuring that football writers are treated in a professional manner. By the mid-2000s, the group consisted of over 300 writers, editors, and columnists who cover pro football. The PFWA also issue several awards and honors following each NFL season.

== Awards ==
=== George Halas Award ===
Note: The George Halas Award should not be confused with the Newspaper Enterprise Association's George Halas Trophy that was awarded to the NFL defensive player of the year from 1966 to 1996, or the NFL's George Halas Trophy that is awarded to the National Football Conference champion.

=== Good Guy Award ===
The PFWA Good Guy Award has been given annually since 2005 to an NFL player "for his qualities and professional style in helping pro football writers do their jobs."

Year	Winner	Team
2005	Jerome Bettis	Pittsburgh Steelers
2006	Tiki Barber	New York Giants
2007	LaDainian Tomlinson	San Diego Chargers
2008	Brett Favre	Green Bay Packers
2009	Kurt Warner	Arizona Cardinals
2010	Drew Brees	New Orleans Saints
2011	Aaron Rodgers	Green Bay Packers
2012	Tim Tebow	Denver Broncos
2013	Tony Gonzalez	Atlanta Falcons
2014	Russell Wilson	Seattle Seahawks
2015	Richard Sherman	Seattle Seahawks
2016	Thomas Davis	Carolina Panthers
2017	Larry Fitzgerald	Arizona Cardinals
2018	Chris Long	Philadelphia Eagles
2019	Chris Long	Philadelphia Eagles
2020	Eli Manning	New York Giants
2021	Philip Rivers	Indianapolis Colts
2022	Cameron Heyward	Pittsburgh Steelers
2023	Jason Kelce	Philadelphia Eagles
2024	C. J. Stroud	Houston Texans
2025	Brandon Graham	Philadelphia Eagles
2026	Dak Prescott	Dallas Cowboys

=== Jack Horrigan Award ===
Since 1974, the PFWA has given an annual award named in memory of sportswriter Jack Horrigan, to honor a league or club official "for his or her qualities and professional style in helping the pro football writers do their job." The most recent five winners have been Thomas Dimitroff (2012), Mike Signora (NFL Vice President of Football Communications) (2013), Pete Carroll (2014), Bruce Arians (2015), and John Elway (2016).

=== Bill Nunn Award ===
See: Bill Nunn Memorial Award

=== Rozelle Award ===
The Rozelle Award is given to the club public relations department that consistently strives for excellence in its dealings and relationships with the media. It is named after Pete Rozelle, who served as commissioner of the NFL from 1960 until 1989.

== Past presidents ==
- George Strickler, Chicago Tribune
- Tony Atchison, Washington Star
- John Steadman, Baltimore News-American
- William Guthrie, New Haven Journal
- Joe King, New York World-Telegram
- Dick Connor, Denver Post
- Edwin Pope, Miami Herald
- Larry Felser, Buffalo News
- Paul Zimmerman, Sports Illustrated
- Larry Fox, New York Daily News
- Bob Roesler, New Orleans Times Picayune
- Cooper Rollow, Chicago Tribune
- Vito Stellino, Baltimore Morning Sun
- Glenn Sheeley, Atlanta Journal-Constitution
- Don Pierson, Chicago Tribune
- Ira Miller, San Francisco Chronicle
- Vic Carucci, Buffalo News
- Len Pasquarelli, Atlanta Journal-Constitution
- Steve Schoenfeld, Arizona Republic
- John Clayton, Tacoma News-Tribune
- Adam Schefter, Denver Post
- John McClain, Houston Chronicle
- David Elfin, Washington Times
- Charean Williams, Fort Worth Star-Telegram
- Mark Gaughan, Buffalo News
- D.Orlando Ledbetter, Atlanta Journal-Constitution
- Jeff Legwold, ESPN
- Lindsay Jones, The Athletic

== See also ==
- Football Writers Association of America (college)
- Baseball Writers' Association of America
- National Collegiate Baseball Writers Association
- Pro Basketball Writers Association
- United States Basketball Writers Association (college)
- Professional Hockey Writers Association
- National Sports Media Association
