= Lists of American writers =

Lists of American writers include:

== By ethnicity ==
- List of African-American writers
- List of Asian-American writers
- List of Cuban-American writers
- List of Egyptian-American writers
- List of Italian-American women writers
- List of Jewish-American writers
- List of Korean-American writers
- List of Mexican-American writers
- List of Puerto Rican writers
- List of Native American writers

== By field ==
- List of American literary critics
- List of American novelists
- List of American playwrights
- List of American poets
- List of American print journalists
- List of American sportswriters

== By region ==
- List of Michigan writers
- List of San Francisco Bay Area writers
- List of Utah writers

== See also ==
- List of American expatriate writers
