= Mary Kay Cabot =

American sportswriter (born 1961)

- Born: December 8, 1961 (age 64); Lakewood, Ohio, U.S.
- Education: Kent State University
- Occupation: Sports journalist
- Years active: 1980s–present
- Employer: The Plain Dealer / Cleveland.com
- Known for: Coverage of the Cleveland Browns and NFL reporting
- Awards: Pro Football Hall of Fame Committee member (Browns beat reporter)

Mary Kay Cabot (born December 8, 1961) is an American sportswriter who covers the Cleveland Browns for the Cleveland Plain Dealer.

== Early life ==
Cabot attended Kent State University, graduating in 1984.

== Career ==
She began her career at the Plain Dealer covering the Cleveland Force soccer team for three seasons.

Cabot began covering the Browns in 1988 and was named the paper's beat reporter in 1991. She became the first woman in the Cleveland market to cover a major sports team.

In addition to her journalism career, Cabot has appeared in videos for Cleveland.com and on a daily podcast, Orange and Brown Talk. She also serves as a Browns analyst for WKYC-TV in Cleveland as well as other local radio stations.

== Awards and honors ==
Cabot was presented the Bill Nunn Memorial Award from the Pro Football Writers of America in August 2025.

== Personal life ==
Cabot married Bill Murman in 1993, and they have three children: Chris (born 1996), Celeste (born 1998), and Camryn (born 2000).
