= Jack Horrigan =

Jack Horrigan may refer to:

- Jack Horrigan (sportswriter)
- Jack Horrigan (rugby league)
