= David Goldberg =

David Goldberg may refer to:

- David E. Goldberg (born 1953), American professor of engineering and computer science at University of Illinois at Urbana-Champaign
- David Theo Goldberg (born 1952), South African philosopher and director of the University of California Humanities Research Institute
- Dave Goldberg (1967–2015), American Internet entrepreneur
- David Goldberg (psychiatrist) (1934–2024), British academic and social psychiatrist
- Dave Goldberg (writer), American sportswriter

== See also ==
- Adam David Goldberg (born 1980), American football offensive tackle
- Gary David Goldberg (1944–2013), American writer and producer for television and film
- Pizzagate conspiracy theory, instigated by Tweet from @DavidGoldbergNY
