= List of American expatriate writers =

== A ==
- Conrad Aiken
- Candace Allen, novelist, cultural critic and screenwriter
- Washington Allston, artist, writer on art
- Maya Angelou, poet, memoirs
- Alan Ansen
- John Ashbery

== B ==
- James Baldwin
- Djuna Barnes
- Bernard Berenson
- Mary Berenson
- Thomas Berger
- John Peale Bishop
- Joan Bodger
- Jane Bowles
- Paul Bowles
- Kay Boyle
- Louis Bromfield
- John Horne Burns
- William S. Burroughs

== C ==
- Vincent O. Carter
- Jerome Charyn
- Eldridge Cleaver, non-fiction, criminal, leading "Black Panther"
- Ira Cohen, poet, publisher
- Cid Corman
- Gregory Corso
- Malcolm Cowley
- Caresse Crosby
- Harry Crosby, "Black Sun Press"
- Robert Crumb, comics
- E. E. Cummings

== D ==
- Edward Dahlberg
- William Demby
- Helen DeWitt
- Irene Dische
- Mabel Dodge (Luhan)
- J. P. Donleavy
- Edward Dorn
- John Dos Passos
- W. E. B. Du Bois
- Rikki Ducornet
- Elaine Dundy
- Andrea Dworkin, memoirs, feminist

== E ==
- T. S. Eliot
- Lucy Ellmann

== F ==
- Ruth Fainlight
- F. Scott Fitzgerald
- Janet Flanner
- John Gould Fletcher
- Charles Henri Ford
- Robert Frost

== G ==
- William Gaddis
- William Gibson, science fiction
- Horatio Greenough, artist, essays on art
- Martha Gellhorn, war correspondent, novelist

== H ==
- H.D.
- Bret Harte
- Marsden Hartley
- Ernest Hemingway
- Patricia Highsmith
- Chester Himes
- Russell Hoban
- Langston Hughes

== I ==
- Rachel Ingalls

== J ==
- Henry James
- Ted Joans
- James Jones

== K ==
- Steve Katz, in Italy 1959–62

== L ==
- Robert Lax
- Andrea Lee
- Charles Godfrey Leland
- Robert Littell
- James Lord

== M ==
- Archibald MacLeish
- David Markson
- Harry Mathews, novels, memoirs, member of Oulipo, editor of Locus Solus
- Mary McCarthy
- Claude McKay
- Stuart Merrill
- Henry Miller
- Derek B. Miller

== N ==
- John Neal, Brother Jonathan: or, the New Englanders, American Writers, critical essays for Blackwood’s Magazine and other British periodicals
- Harold Norse

== O ==
- George Oppen
- Mary Oppen

== P ==
- Robert M. Pirsig, popular philosophy
- Katherine Anne Porter
- Ezra Pound
- Frederic Prokosch

== R ==
- John Reed
- Stephan Regina-Thon
- Laura Riding
- Waverley Root, journalism, non-fiction (food)
- Robert Ruark

== S ==
- James Sallis, crime, science fiction, editor of New Worlds for two years
- George Santayana
- Evelyn Scott
- David Sedaris
- Alan Seeger
- Irwin Shaw
- John Sladek
- Agnes Smedley
- Logan Pearsall Smith
- Robert Pearsall Smith
- Gary Snyder
- Terry Southern
- Francis Steegmuller
- Gertrude Stein
- Donald Ogden Stewart
- John Strand

== T ==
- Paul Theroux, travel writer
- Alice B. Toklas, cookbook writer and life partner of Gertrude Stein

== V ==
- Gore Vidal

== W ==
- Glenway Wescott
- Nathanael West, in Paris in autumn 1926 (not for years as often stated)
- Edith Wharton
- Edmund White
- Robert Wilson, theatre, film
- Thomas Wolfe
- Constance Fenimore Woolson
- Willard Huntington Wright, crime
- Richard Wright

== Y ==
- Frank Yerby
