= Norman Miller =

Norman or Norm Miller may refer to:

- Norman Charles Miller (1934–2025), American journalist
- Norman M. Miller (1908–1946), United States Navy officer
- Norm Miller (politician) (born 1956), politician in Ontario, Canada
- Norm Miller (baseball) (born 1946), American baseball player
- Norm Miller (writer) (1917–2005), American sportswriter
