= Jerry Magee =

American newspaper columnist (1928–2019)

- Born: April 11, 1928; Chicago, Illinois, U.S.
- Died: January 2, 2019 (aged 90); San Diego, California, U.S.
- Occupations: Journalist, columnist
- Writing career
- Genre: Sports

Jerome Field Magee (April 11, 1928 – January 2, 2019) was an American newspaper columnist.

Magee was a sports writer in San Diego for 52 years, retiring from the San Diego Union-Tribune in 2008. He began his career more than five decades earlier at the then-San Diego Union and also wrote for Pro Football Weekly.

== Biography ==
Magee, who was born in Chicago, Illinois, was raised in Nebraska. He graduated in 1950 from the University of Nebraska. He served in the Army in Korea.

== Career ==
His first job newspaper job was as a copyboy at the Omaha World-Herald, where one of his tasks was to mix flour and water into the paste used by copy readers. He joined the San Diego Union-Tribune in 1956.

Magee was called "an American Football League apologist" by his contemporaries who covered NFL football, adopting it himself and regularly quoting it. He took on what he has called the "NFL apologists," including William Wallace, sports columnist with The New York Times, and Jerry Green of the Detroit Free Press, in Magee's attempt to puncture what he called "NFL myths."

Magee brought attention to the AFL's style of football, including writing about Will McDonough and his service on the American Football League Hall of Fame board of selectors. Magee wrote frequently about interviews he had with American Football League superfan, archivist and historian Ange Coniglio.

Upon Magee's retirement in September 2008, the Union-Tribune published a tribute article about Magee that was written by people he covered and worked with, including former San Diego Chargers running back Hank Bauer.

== Recognition ==
October 29, 2008 was proclaimed "Jerry Magee Day" by the San Diego City Council in recognition of his more than 50 years as "one of the region's top sports writers."

In 1987, Magee was given the Dick McCann Memorial Award from the Professional Football Writers of America organization, which is handed out to reporters who have made "a long and distinguished contribution" to pro football through coverage.
