= Frank Luksa =

Frank Edward Luksa Jr. (February 25, 1935 – October 23, 2012) was an American sportswriter best known for his twenty-year tenure covering the Dallas Cowboys.

== Career ==
Luksa covered the Cowboys for the Dallas Morning News, Fort Worth Star-Telegram, Times Herald and ESPN. Starting in their 1960 inaugural season, Luksa continued writing about the team until his 2004 retirement. He covered the Cowboys during their victories in Super Bowl VI, Super Bowl XII, Super Bowl XXVII, Super Bowl XXVIII, and Super Bowl XXX.

== Awards and honors ==
Luksa received the Dick McCann Memorial Award in 1992, presented by the Pro Football Writers of America. In January 2010, Luksa was a co-recipient of the Blackie Sherrod Award, along with Pat Summerall and Dan Jenkins, for his career covering the Cowboys.

== Personal life and death ==
Luksa married Henrietta and had two daughters. He died at a hospital in Plano, Texas from complications of heart bypass surgery in 2012.
