= George Toma =

American groundskeeper (born 1929)

- Born: February 2, 1929 (age 97); Edwardsville, Pennsylvania, U.S.
- Occupation: Groundskeeper
- Known for: Groundskeeper for the Kansas City Chiefs and Kansas City Royals

George P. Toma (born February 2, 1929) is an American groundskeeper who specializes in working on sports facilities. Toma attended every Super Bowl from 1967 to 2023.

He has been nicknamed the "Sodfather" and "The God of Sod."

== Early life ==
George Toma was born on February 2, 1929 to George and Mary Toma. George's parents were both second generation Rusyn Americans. As a youngster, he helped support his family by working at Artillery Park in Wilkes-Barre, Pennsylvania, home of the minor league baseball Wilkes-Barre Barons. He eventually worked his way up to head groundskeeper.

After serving in the military during the Korean War, Toma had a choice of working as stadium groundskeeper for minor league teams in Kansas City or Denver. He reportedly took the Kansas City job because the field was in worse shape than Denver.

== Career ==
=== Kansas City sports teams ===
Toma has maintained the fields at numerous stadiums used by Major League Baseball and National Football League teams. For much of his career, Toma was the head groundskeeper for the Truman Sports Complex in Kansas City, Missouri; which includes the Kansas City Royals' Kauffman Stadium, and the Kansas City Chiefs' Arrowhead Stadium.

Toma worked for the then-Kansas City Athletics until the team relocated to Oakland in 1968, and then for the expansion Royals, at Municipal Stadium, where the NFL Kansas City Chiefs also played. Municipal Stadium was also home to the Kansas City Spurs Soccer team.

In 1972, two new stadiums were built in Kansas City, Royals Stadium (now Kauffman) and Arrowhead Stadium. At the time of their opening, they both featured artificial turf. However, according to Toma, artificial turf fields also require significant maintenance. His crews maintained the two carpets so well that they remained in use for two decades, far longer than is normally the case for artificial turf.

In 2012, Toma was inducted into the Kansas City Royals Hall of Fame.

=== Super Bowl ===
Toma was contracted by the NFL to prepare the field for every Super Bowl from 1967 to 2023.

Toma’s reputation won him the job of preparing the field for the first Super Bowl in 1967, as team owners from both the NFL and the American Football League contracted with him to head the grounds crew at the Los Angeles Memorial Coliseum. He was given free rein by then-NFL Commissioner Pete Rozelle to decorate the field however he chose.

==== Super Bowl LVII controversy ====
Toma and the condition of the field in Super Bowl LVII were heavily criticized by players of both teams—the Philadelphia Eagles and Kansas City Chiefs—coaches and fans. Players on both teams could be seen slipping on the grass surface. Eagles linebacker Haason Reddick described the field as the "worst field that I've ever played on" and Eagles offensive lineman Jordan Mailata referred to the surface as a "water park out there." Chiefs defensive tackle Chris Jones called the field's surface "terrible." There were also safety issues regarding the field as Chiefs running back Isiah Pacheco could be seen twisting his ankle on the surface. Some Eagles fans questioned Toma’s potential motives, as he is a Chiefs employee and fan of the team. The playing surface significantly hampered the Eagles defensive line, which was their strength, and hampered their ability to rush the quarterback. Although Toma had praised league field director Ed Mangan for his work prior to the game, he blamed Mangan for overwatering the playing surface and then immediately bringing the portable surface back indoors without allowing the grass to absorb sunlight. Additionally, he blamed Mangan for failing to sand the surface properly or in a timely manner, and covering the field with a tarp while it was still wet, giving it a foul smell.

=== Other work ===
Toma was called upon to supervise the grounds crews during the 1984 and 1996 Olympic Games, and the 1994 World Cup.

Toma officially retired from full-time work in 1999. He continues to work as a consultant for sports facilities and their groundskeepers around the United States.

Toma was honored by the Pro Football Hall of Fame in 2001 as the recipient of the Ralph Hay Pioneer Award. Toma was inducted into the Major League Baseball Groundskeepers Hall of Fame on January 8, 2012, as one of its charter members.

== See also ==
- Never Miss a Super Bowl Club
