= Sportsjournalists.com =

Sportsjournalists.com is an Internet forum frequented by journalists who cover sports. In 2006, it was named one of the best non-corporate sports web sites by Sports Illustrated. The forum has been directly involved in several sports journalism controversies:

- Michael Gee, a former columnist for the Boston Herald, was fired from a teaching job at Boston University after describing one of his students on Sportsjournalists.com as "incredibly hot"
- Wallace Matthews, a columnist for the New York Post, announced his resignation from that newspaper on Sportsjournalists.com and criticized the newspaper for a gossip item many interpreted to claim that Mike Piazza was gay
- Sportsjournalists.com was first to report on October 10, 2006, that Woody Paige would leave the TV show Cold Pizza and return to the Denver Post as a columnist. At that time, Woody Paige denied that he would be leaving Cold Pizza. On November 2, it was announced that Woody Paige would return to the Denver Post.

Sportsjournalists.com was briefly shut down in 2002. Breaking sports news and general news items are often posted on Sportsjournalists.com before they are reported in the media.
