= Dick McCann (American football) =

American football executive (died 1967)

Personal information
- Born: 1909/1910; Washington, D.C., U.S.
- Died: November 5, 1967 (aged 57); Washington, D.C., U.S.

Career history
- Washington Redskins (1946) Publicity director; Washington Redskins (1947–1961) General manager; Pro Football Hall of Fame (1962–1967) Executive director
- Executive profile at Pro Football Reference

Richard P. McCann (1909/1910 – November 5, 1967) was an American football executive who was the general manager of the Washington Redskins of the National Football League (NFL) from 1947 to 1961. He later served as the first president and executive director of the Pro Football Hall of Fame.

== Journalism ==
McCann was born and raised in Washington, D.C. He studied at a seminary in Beacon, New York before deciding to go into journalism. He began his newspaper career in 1927 in his hometown. He was a court and police reporter as well as a sports columnist for The Washington Herald, The Washington Star, and the Washington Daily News.

In 1934, McCann married Mary Runyon, the daughter of writer Damon Runyon. She gave birth to their son later that year. Mary Runyon McCann was declared incompetent in 1947 and placed under the care of a court-appointed guardian. She spent much of her life in institutionalized care.

In 1937, McCann joined the Newspaper Enterprise Association in Cleveland. The following year he went to work for King Features Syndicate in New York City. Here, McCann also worked in public relations, including for the committee for the celebration of President Franklin D. Roosevelt's birthday and for boxing manager Mike Jacobs. While in New York, McCann also wrote for the Daily News. He served in the United States Navy during World War II. He returned to D.C. in 1945, taking over Vincent X. Flaherty's sports column in the Washington Times-Herald.

== Washington Redskins ==
On September 14, 1946, McCann became the publicity director for the Washington Redskins of the National Football League (NFL). He was promoted to general manager on April 30, 1947. The Redskins compiled a 64–111 record in McCann's 15 seasons as general manager. They had only three winning seasons and made no playoff appearances during that time. The Redskins also fought against racial integration, not signing their first black player until 1962 and only then under pressure from the federal government, which threatened to block the use of D.C. Stadium, which they owned.

== Pro Football Hall of Fame ==
On April 3, 1962, McCann was selected over two other finalists, Bud Erickson and Bill Edwards, to become the Pro Football Hall of Fame's first director. He supervised construction of the Hall, the collection of football memorabilia, and the election of the first seventeen charter members. On September 7, 1963, the Pro Football Hall of Fame opened to the public. He led the Hall of Fame until his death on November 5, 1967. He was survived by his second wife, Alva, and his son Richard.

In 1969, the Professional Football Writers of America created the Dick McCann Memorial Award to honor a reporter for their outstanding contribution to pro football. In 2021, it was renamed the Bill Nunn Award due to McCann's association with the Redskins' segregationist policies.
