= Cameron Snyder =

American sportswriter (1916–2010)

Cameron Crockett Snyder (October 9, 1916 – January 29, 2010) was an American sportswriter for The Baltimore Sun. He was awarded the Dick McCann Memorial Award in 1982.

== Background ==
Snyder was born in Rippon, West Virginia, to Burnell C. and Evelyne M. Snyder. He was raised in Baltimore where he attended Calvert Hall College.

Snyder was a college football player at Drexel University, graduating in 1941. In August of that year he was drafted into the army, serving in the China Burma India Theater.

== Career ==
When he finished college in 1941, Snyder was offered a tryout with the Chicago Bears but was drafted into the Army. He served five years, in a mountain infantry unit that served in India, China and Burma, rising from private to captain.

Snyder was originally hired by The Baltimore Sun in 1953 where he covered the Baltimore Colts until his retirement in 1986. In 1982 he was admitted into the "writer's wing" of the Pro Football Hall of Fame by the Pro Football Writers Association.

== Death ==
Snyder died at his home in Fullerton, Maryland, aged 93, from lung cancer.
