= Gary Pettigrew =

Canadian gridiron football player (1944–2023)

No. 88, 71
- Positions: Defensive tackle, Defensive end

Personal information
- Born: October 10, 1944; Vancouver, British Columbia, Canada
- Died: January 21, 2023 (aged 78); Spokane, Washington, U.S.
- Listed height: 6 ft 5 in (1.96 m)
- Listed weight: 255 lb (116 kg)

Career information
- High school: Gonzaga Prep (Spokane, Washington, U.S.)
- College: Stanford
- NFL draft: 1966: 2nd round, 20th overall pick
- AFL draft: 1966: 6th round, 49th overall pick

Career history
- Philadelphia Eagles (1966–1974); New York Giants (1974)

Awards and highlights
- First-team All-PCC (1964)

Career NFL statistics
- Fumble recoveries: 5
- Sacks: 20
- Stats at Pro Football Reference

Gary Louis Pettigrew (October 10, 1944 – January 21, 2023) was a Canadian professional American football defensive lineman in the National Football League (NFL) for the Philadelphia Eagles and New York Giants. He played college football at Stanford University and was selected in the second round of the 1966 NFL draft. Pettigrew was also selected in the sixth round of the 1966 AFL draft by the San Diego Chargers.

== Early life ==
Pettigrew was born on October 10, 1944 in Vancouver, British Columbia. Pettigrew was recruited to play college football by Notre Dame and Oregon, but played for Stanford on a football scholarship. Pettigrew majored in English literature.

In 1964, Pettigrew was described by The New York Times as being the leader of Stanford's defense.

== Career ==
=== Philadelphia Eagles ===
Pettigrew started for the Eagles at defensive end as a rookie.

Pettigrew was named as the Eagles' most valuable defensive player in 1970. That season, Pettigrew was named by William N. Wallace as among the players who were very good, but would not be among the league's statistical leaders.

Heading into the 1971 season, Wallace described Pettigrew as being "near the all-pro level."

In 1973, the Eagles attempted to trade Pettigrew to the New York Giants for Ron Hornsby. That season, Pettigrew led the Eagles defensive line in tackles.

In 1974, Pettigrew was waived by the Eagles after the Eagles had signed Larry Marshall.

=== New York Giants ===
On October 25, 1974, Pettigrew was claimed off waivers by the New York Giants. On November 28, 1974, Pettigrew was placed on injured reserve.

Pettigrew unexpectedly retired before the start of the 1975 season.

== Personal life ==
Pettigrew's roommate in Philadelphia was Steve Sabol, who would later be inducted into the Pro Football Hall of Fame for being the founder of NFL Films.

Pettigrew died after a long battle with myelodysplastic syndrome on January 21, 2023, at the age of 78.
