= Ed Bouchette =

American sportswriter

- Occupation: American sportswriter
- Years active: 1985 until 2019
- Employer: Pittsburgh Post-Gazette
- Awards: Dick McCann Memorial Award

Ed Bouchette is an American sportswriter. From 1985 until 2019, he was a writer for the Pittsburgh Post-Gazette covering the Pittsburgh Steelers, before moving to The Athletic in 2019. He is a member of the Pro Football Hall of Fame's selection committee.

In 2014, Bouchette was given the Dick McCann Memorial Award from the Pro Football Hall of Fame.
