= Len Shapiro =

American sportswriter (born 1947)

- Born: Leonard Shapiro; February 2, 1947 (age 79)
- Education: University of Wisconsin–Madison; Missouri School of Journalism
- Occupation: Sportswriter
- Spouse: Vicky Moon
- Children: 3

Leonard Shapiro (born February 2, 1947) is an American sportswriter who wrote for The Washington Post from 1969 to 2010.

== Background ==
Shapiro was born in Brooklyn in 1947, and grew up in Syosset, New York. He studied journalism with a minor in science at the University of Wisconsin–Madison, graduating in 1968, and received a master's degree from the Missouri School of Journalism the following year.

== Career ==
Shapiro joined The Washington Post in 1969, starting as a copy editor. The following year he was hired to report high school sports, before moving to covering the Washington Redskins in 1973. From 1973 until 1978, he was the Redskins' beat reporter for the Post. In 1979 he became an assistant sports editor for the paper, and was subsequently promoted to deputy sports editor and then to sports editor in 1987. He was the newspaper's chief NFL correspondent, and also covered a variety of other sports. He was president of the Golf Writers Association of America from 2005 to 2006.

Shapiro retired from the Post 2010, and subsequently became editor of the Country ZEST and Style Magazine of Middleburg, Virginia. He has written seven books, and has taught sports journalism courses at the University of Wisconsin.

In 2001, he received the Dick McCann Memorial Award from the Pro Football Hall of Fame. He was inducted into the Washington Jewish Hall of Fame in 2002.

== Personal life ==
Shapiro is married to Vicky Moon, an editor and writer; they have three children, Jennifer, Emily, and Taylor.
