= Vito Stellino =

American sportswriter (born 1941)

Vito Stellino (born May 23, 1941) is an American sportswriter who is best known for his work covering the National Football League (NFL).

== Career ==
Stellino began his career in 1963 covering the Detroit Lions for United Press International. After serving two years in the United States Army, he re-joined UPI in New York City before moving to the Pittsburgh Post-Gazette as a Steelers beat writer, where he covered the team's victories in Super Bowls IX, X, XIII and XIV.

== Awards ==
Stellino received the Dick McCann Memorial Award from the Pro Football Hall of Fame in 1989.
