= Don Banks (writer) =

American sportswriter

Don Banks (1962 – August 4, 2019) was an American sportswriter who covered the NFL for Sports Illustrated.

== Career ==
Banks started his career covering sports as an intern with the St. Petersburg Times, before moving to cover the Tampa Bay Buccaneers for the paper. He later moved to Minnesota to cover football for the Minneapolis Star Tribune and the St. Paul Pioneer Press.

Banks joined SI.com, (Sports Illustrated's website) in 2000 as an NFL writer, where his Snap Judgements columns on Sunday nights were highly regarded. He remained there through the 2016 season.

After leaving SI.com, he wrote for NFL.com, Bleacher Report, Patriots.com and The Athletic between 2016 and 2020. When the Raiders moved to Las Vegas prior to the 2020 NFL season, he was hired by the Las Vegas Review-Journal on August 1, 2019.

== Awards and honors ==
In 2020, Banks was posthumously selected as the recipient of the Bill Nunn Memorial Award from the Pro Football Hall of Fame.

== Personal life ==
Banks was married to Alissa, and they had two sons: Matthew and Micah.
