= Tom Kowalski =

Thomas Henry Kowalski (died August 29, 2011) was an American sportswriter known for his time covering the Detroit Lions.

== Career ==
Kowalski began covering the Lions in 1978 for The Oakland Press before moving to Booth Newspapers and MLive.com. He also contributed to The Sporting News.

He regularly appeared as a “Lions Insider” for Sports Radio 1130 (WDFN) in Detroit and Fox 2 Detroit, and made an early transition to online writing, with his work available on MLive.com.

Kowalski died of an apparent heart attack at his home in 2011.

== Awards and honors ==
Kowalski received the Dick McCann Memorial Award from the Pro Football Hall of Fame in 2012. In 2020, he was posthumously inducted into the Michigan Sports Hall of Fame.
