= Pete Finney =

American sportswriter (1927–2016)

Peter Finney (October 17, 1927 – August 13, 2016) was an American sportswriter, best known for his long career covering the New Orleans Saints.

== Life and career ==
Finney graduated from Jesuit and Loyola University. He began covering the Saints in 1967, the franchise's inaugural season. He continued to cover the team until his death.

== Awards and honors ==
Finney was named Louisiana Sportswriter of the Year 17 times. He was inducted into the Louisiana Sports Hall of Fame, the Greater New Orleans Sports Hall of Fame, and the New Orleans Saints Hall of Fame. In 2010 he received the Dick McCann Memorial Award from the Pro Football Hall of Fame, and the A.J. Liebling Award for outstanding boxing writer.

He was elected to the U.S. Basketball Writers Hall of Fame, the LSU Manship School of Mass Communication Hall of Fame and the Loyola New Orleans School of Mass Communication Den of Distinction.
