= Art Daley =

American sportswriter

- Born: Arthur Lunkenheimer; August 6, 1916; St. Paul, Minnesota, US
- Died: February 19, 2011 (aged 94)
- Occupation: Sportswriter

Art Daley (born Arthur James Lunkenheimer; August 16, 1916 – February 19, 2011) was an American sportswriter who is best known for his over 60 years covering the Green Bay Packers of the National Football League from 1941 to 2011.

== Early life ==
Daley grew up in Fond du Lac, Wisconsin, and served in the United States Army during World War II.

== Career ==
Daley served as a sports writer for the Green Bay Press-Gazette for 21 years. He was a charter member of the Pro Football Hall of Fame selection committee, serving on it until 1998. Along with Jack Yuenger, Daley founded the Green Bay Packers Yearbook in 1960, and was an original member of both the board of directors and the selection committee of the Green Bay Packers Hall of Fame. In 1978, Daley joined "Packer Report", where he was a writer until his death.

== Honors ==
Daley was inducted into the Packers Hall of Fame as a contributor in 1993, and in 1977 was awarded the Dick McCann Memorial Award from the Pro Football Hall of Fame.
