= Gordon Forbes (sportswriter) =

American sportswriter

Gordon Maxwell Forbes (February 6, 1930 – June 25, 2020) was an American sportswriter best known for his career covering the National Football League (NFL).

== Early life ==
Forbes graduated from Duke University with a Bachelor of Arts in English in 1955 and served in the United States Army at Fort Monmouth, New Jersey.

== Career ==
He began his writing career with The Patchogue Advance while he was still in high school, writing a weekly column titled "Hot Corner" before moving to the Florida Times-Union. During this time Forbes covered high school sports, the University of Florida's football and basketball teams, and the Jacksonville Suns.

In 1960 he joined The Philadelphia Inquirer. Forbes was the paper's Philadelphia Eagles beat writer from 1966 to 1981, covered Villanova University track and field, and basketball. In 1982, he joined USA Today, where he became the paper's first Pro Football editor, a role he held until his retirement in 2002. Over his career, he covered over 900 games, including 39 Super Bowls.

Forbes wrote three books in his career. His first, Tales from the Philadelphia Eagles Sideline: A Collection of the Greatest Eagles Stories Ever Told, was released in 2006 and updated in 2011. In 2009, he wrote Dick Vermeil: Whistle in His Mouth, Heart on His Sleeve, a biography of the former Eagles head coach. In 2018, Forbes released his last book When the 49ers Were Kings: How Bill Walsh and Ed DeBartolo Jr. Built a Football Dynasty in San Francisco.

== Awards and honors ==
In 1988, Forbes was named the recipient of the Dick McCann Memorial Award from the Pro Football Hall of Fame. He was inducted into the Suffolk Sports Hall of Fame in 2001.
