= Dave Brady =

American sportswriter (died 1988)

Dave Brady (died April 1, 1988) was an American sportswriter for The Washington Post. He was the 1973 Dick McCann Memorial Award recipient from the Pro Football Hall of Fame.

== Career ==
Brady graduated from St. Joseph's University in Pennsylvania, and was a sports writer and editor with the Camden Courier-Post in New Jersey from 1930 to 1943, and again in 1946. He served in the merchant marine and worked for the Army Transport Service in the Pacific during World War II.

After the war ended, Brady joined The Washington Post in 1946, starting as a sports desk editor and a boxing authority, before beginning his football writing career. Brady would choose and cover the "game of the week": the best pro football game anywhere in the country.

== Personal life ==
He married Mary Agnes Doyle, and together they had two sons, Kevin and Terrence, and a daughter, Kathleen.
