= Mark Kriegel =

American author, journalist, and television personality

- Education: Swarthmore College; Columbia University
- Occupations: American author Journalist; Television commentator

Mark Kriegel is an American author, journalist, and television commentator. He has been an analyst and essayist for ESPN's boxing programming since 2017 and is regarded as "the greatest chronicler of fighting and fighters, even ahead of such lions as W.C. Heinz and William Nack and Norman Mailer" and "perhaps the finest boxing writer in America"

== Early years ==
He is the son of author and essayist Leonard Kriegel. He grew up in New York City, and attended Stuyvesant High School, Swarthmore College, and the Columbia University Graduate School of Journalism.

== Career ==
=== Newspaper journalist ===
He worked as a general assignment reporter at The Miami Herald and The New York Daily News. In 1990, his piece for the Daily News Sunday Magazine, “The People’s Court” – an examination of basketball culture in New York – was a finalist for the Pulitzer Prize in the Feature Writing category.

The following year, he became a sports columnist at the New York Post. From 1994 to 2001, he was a columnist at the Daily News. He has also been a national columnist at FOXSports.com, and a contributing writer for Esquire. His Esquire profile of boxer Oscar De Hoya – “The Great (Almost) White Hope” was anthologized in At the Fights: American Writers on Boxing and The Book of Boxing, edited by W.C. Heinz.

Kriegel has been called "the best writer on sports that we have" by Charles Pierce of Esquire.

=== Author ===
Kriegel is the author of critically acclaimed New York Times bestsellers, Namath: A Biography, about Hall of Fame quarterback Joe Namath, and Pistol: the Life of Pete Maravich. His 2012 book, The Good Son: The Life of Ray “Boom Boom” Mancini – about a boxer's relationship with his father, and a man who died at his hands in the ring – was made into a documentary by the same name.

In 2025, Kriegel wrote Baddest Man: The Making of Mike Tyson chronicling Tyson's rise from a juvenile criminal in Brownsville, Brooklyn to his 1988 superfight against Michael Spinks. It uncovers details that had not been explored in any previous Tyson biography. The Pulitzer Prize-winning author Jonathan Eig called it 'a biography as nimble and powerful as its subject -- unforgettable.' Greg Bishop of Sports Illustrated said Kriegel is 'the perfect author to frame Tyson exactly as he was and is,' calling the book 'the most nuanced, most human portrait of Tyson ever created.'. The Chicago Tribune's Rick Kogan called Baddest Man 'a uniquely American book, filled with enough mentors and monsters to do any Dickens novel.'

Kriegel's work often focuses on conflicts between fathers and sons in sports – especially boxing. A front-page column he wrote for the New York Post, detailing the relationship between boxing trainer Teddy Atlas, Mafia figure Sammy (“the Bull”) Gravano, and Gravano's son, became the basis for his novel, Bless Me, Father, which drew praise from the writer Richard Price, and the Los Angeles Times (which called it “mesmerizing.”)

=== Television ===
In 2011–12, Kriegel hosted a sports-themed interview show, Barfly, for FOX Sports Net. In June, 2012, he joined NFL Network as an analyst on the launch of its morning show, NFL AM. He contributed essay pieces for the network's Total Access show and Sunday features for Game Day Morning. Kriegel also wrote the Sports Emmy-winning All Access series for Showtime. His All Access: Chávez, about the turbulent relationship between the great Mexican boxer, Julio César Chávez, and his son, Julio Jr., explores the same father-son themes Kriegel focused on as a biographer.

He has been part of Sports Emmy-winning teams for the NFL Network (2013 for “Outstanding New Approaches”) and Showtime (2015 for “Outstanding Sports Documentary Series”) for All Access.

In January 2016, Showtime launched a digital series, “The Reveal with Mark Kriegel,” featuring deep dive, often emotional interviews with boxers and other sports personalities."

In 2017, he wrote and co-produced a feature-length documentary about Prison Fight “Prison Fighters: 5 Rounds to Freedom,” the story of a controversial government program that allows inmates to fight for their freedom in Muay Thai matches. The program, as Kriegel told the New York Post: “Can violent men redeem themselves through violent acts?”

In 2022, Kriegel narrated a tribute package for Shad Gaspard's posthumous induction into the WWE Hall of Fame as the class of 2022's Warrior Award recipient

In 2022, Kriegel was the recipient of the Boxing Writers Association of America's Nat Fleischer Award for Excellence in Boxing Journalism

He's been a part of three Emmy-winning teams for the NFL Network and Showtime.

On September 14, 2025, Kriegel was a part of Netflix's broadcast team as a desk analyst for its presentation of the Canelo Álvarez vs. Terence Crawford fight card.

== Personal life ==
Kriegel lives in Santa Monica, California with his daughter, Holiday.

== Bibliography ==
=== Biographies ===
- Namath: A Biography (2004). ISBN 9780143035350
- Pistol: The Life of Pete Maravich (2007). ISBN 9780743284981
- The Good Son: The Life of Ray "Boom Boom" Mancini (2012). ISBN 9780743286350
- Baddest Man: The Making of Mike Tyson (2025). ISBN 9780735223400

=== Novels ===
- Bless Me, Father (1996). ISBN 9780425155745
