= Dan Rafael =

American sportswriter (born 1970)

- Born: August 25, 1970 (age 56); Albany, New York, U.S.
- Education: Binghamton University
- Occupations: Online and television journalist for ESPN.com
- Notable credit(s): ESPN.com senior boxing writer (2005–2020), USA Today staff writer (2000–2005), Press & Sun-Bulletin staff writer (1996–2000), The Saratogian staff writer (1993–1996)

Dan Rafael (/ˈreɪfiəl/ RAY-fee-əl; born August 25, 1970) is an American sportswriter known for his coverage of boxing and baseball.

== Early life and education ==
Rafael was born in Albany, New York. He attended Binghamton University, where he wrote for the school paper. He started as sports writer, and worked his way to managing editor. He also served an internship at the local newspaper, the Press & Sun-Bulletin.

== Career ==
=== Baseball ===
Rafael later took a part-time job at The Saratogian, a community newspaper published in Saratoga Springs, New York. When a full-time job opened at the newspaper, he took it, then moved to a reporting position at the Press & Sun-Bulletin, covering college sports and local auto-racing. He was later assigned to cover the Binghamton Mets.

Gannett, the owner of the Binghamton newspaper, fostered writers by detailing them to Virginia for four months, thoroughly grounding them in the newspaper business, working at USA Today. Rafael began his course in August 1998. He covered major-league baseball. When baseball season ended, the newspaper's principal boxing reporter, Jon Saraceno, was moving up, so Rafael was asked to cover boxing.

Rafael's temporary duty at USA Today ended in December 1998, and he returned to Binghamton.

=== Boxing ===
In January 2000, he was asked to return to USA Today on a permanent basis as a boxing writer.

In September 2004, ESPN began pursuing Rafael, desiring to strengthen its boxing coverage. He began with ESPN.com in March 2005. He writes in-depth coverage pieces, and his specialty is his weekly compilation of rankings.

In January 2016, ESPN announced Rafael had been signed to a new multi-year agreement. His contract ended in April 2020.

Rafael joined World Boxing News (WBN) in May 2021 following discussions with WBN editor Phil Jay. Rafael left WBN in early 2022. He joined Big Fight Weekend, a boxing podcast, in April 2022.

== Awards and recognition ==
- In 2013, Rafael was awarded the Nat Fleischer Award for Excellence in Boxing Journalism from the Boxing Writers Association of America.
- On December 8, 2012, Dead Spin's writer, Iron Mike Gallego, recognized Dan Rafael as "The Most Important Journalist in Boxing".
