= Bob Oates (writer) =

American sportswriter (1915–2009)

Robert Maclay Oates (May 20, 1915 – April 7, 2009) was an American sportswriter who covered football for the Los Angeles Times.

== Early life ==
Oates served in the United States Army during World War II, staying in the country due to his poor eyesight. He graduated from Yankton College and earned a master's degree in journalism from UCLA.

== Career ==
Oates worked for various Los Angeles-era newspapers starting in 1946, covering USC and UCLA football, and covered the Los Angeles Rams for the Los Angeles Herald Examiner from 1962 to 1967, and then for the Times from 1968 until January 2007, writing a nationally focused column after the area lost its last NFL teams after the 1994 season. He covered each of the first 39 Super Bowls.

== Awards and honors ==
Oates was inducted into The South Dakota Sports Hall of Fame in 2006, and received the Dick McCann Memorial Award from the Pro Football Hall of Fame in 1974.

== Personal life ==
Oates married Marnie in 1937 and they were married until her death in 2006. They had two sons: Bob Jr. and Steve.
