= Larry Felser =

American sports columnist

Larry Felser (April 5, 1933 – April 24, 2013) was a sports columnist and writer for the Buffalo Courier-Express and later, The Buffalo Evening News, where he was a football beat writer, a columnist, and rose to the position of sports editor. Felser also wrote a column for The Sporting News.

Felser was born in Buffalo, New York. He covered every one of the first 37 Super Bowls, until his retirement, and was an impassioned advocate for American Football League players nominated to the Pro Football Hall of Fame, for which he served on the board of selectors. In 1984, he was the youngest writer ever to receive the Dick McCann Memorial Award for long and distinguished reporting of Professional Football. In 2000, he was inducted into the Greater Buffalo Sports Hall of Fame.

Felser died in Amherst, New York, aged 80. Felser and NFL Films head Steven Sabol were among only a few people to have been present at every Super Bowl game at the time of their respective deaths.

== See also ==
- American Football League players, coaches and contributors
