= Jimmy Murphy (sportswriter) =

American sportswriter

- Born: c. 1891; New York City, U.S.
- Died: December 11, 1970 (aged 79); Queens, New York, U.S.
- Occupation: Sportswriter
- Employers: Brooklyn Eagle (1905–1955); New York World-Telegram and The Sun (1956–1966)
- Spouse: Mary Agnes Kenney
- Children: 2

James Joseph "Jimmy" Murphy (c. 1891 – December 11, 1970) was an American sportswriter who worked at the Brooklyn Eagle newspaper for over 50 years, until the newspaper folded in 1955. He then worked at the New York World-Telegram and The Sun.

He began working at the Brooklyn Eagle at the age of 14 and up until the newspaper folded. Mostly, he covered high school and sandlot baseball in the borough. He was the one responsible for getting Sandy Koufax, the Hall of Fame pitcher, signed with his hometown Brooklyn Dodgers; at the time, Koufax was a pitcher for the Parkviews, a sandlot baseball team in the Coney Island Sports League. Murphy urged the Dodgers to take a look at Koufax who was being courted by other teams as well.

He died at his home in Rockaway, Queens. He was survived by his wife Mary Agnes (née Kenney) and two children, James and Anita, as well as eleven grandchildren.

== See also ==
- List of American sportswriters
