= Hugh Brown (sportswriter) =

American sportswriter (c.1906–1985)

Hugh Brown (c. 1906 – January 23, 1985) was a British-born American sportswriter who was best known for his work with the Philadelphia Bulletin.

== Early life ==
Brown was a native of Edinburgh, Scotland. His family came to the United States when he was five. He attended New York University before dropping out to pursue his career as a writer.

== Career ==
Brown worked for the Waterbury Republican (in Connecticut), Manchester Union-Leader (in New Hampshire), New Haven Register, and the Hartford Courant before joining the Bulletin in 1945. He retired from the Bulletin in 1971.

== Later life and death ==
In July 1983, Brown was awarded the Dick McCann Memorial Award for his contributions to sports columns.

Brown died from a heart attack in Savannah, Tennessee, on January 23, 1985, at the age of 78.
