= Lewis Atchison =

American sportswriter (1910–1998)

Lewis F. Atchison (1910 – December 12, 1998) was an American sportswriter. He is best known for his over three decades working for The Washington Star, where he covered the Washington Commanders.

== Career ==
Atchison attended St. John's College High School and Mount St. Mary's College, and joined The Washington Post, before leaving for the Star.

He was awarded the Dick McCann Memorial Award from the Pro Football Hall of Fame in 1972.
