= Rick Gosselin =

American sportswriter

Rick Gosselin is an American sportswriter who covered the NFL and the Dallas Cowboys for Dallas Morning News.

== Career ==
Gosselin began his career covering the Kansas City Royals, and then worked as a reporter for the NBA. He covered hockey in New York and Detroit. He has also covered the Olympics, golf, boxing, and 35 Super Bowls.

Gosselin joined the Dallas Morning News in 1990, after spending time in Detroit, New York City, and Kansas City. In 1992, he was assigned as a beat reporter for the paper, and he became known for his NFL draft analysis, a role he held until 2012, when he was named "general sports columnist".

In 2004, he received the Dick McCann Memorial Award from the Pro Football Hall of Fame.

He is a frequent guest on KTCK The Ticket, a Dallas sports radio station on "The Norm and D Invasion" with Donovan Lewis and Norm Hitzges. His trademark name is The Goose.
