= Jesse Abramson =

American sports writer (1904–1979)

- Born: Jesse P. Abramson; March 3, 1904
- Died: June 11, 1979 (aged 75)
- Occupation: Sports writer
- Known for: His work for the New York Herald Tribune

Jesse P. Abramson (March 3, 1904 – June 11, 1979) was an American sports writer.

== Biography ==
Abramson was the founder of the New York Track Writers Association. The Jesse Abramson Award is named after him.

Between 1924 and 1964, Abramson wrote for the New York Herald Tribune. In 1976, he was a press liaison for the Olympic Committee of the United States.

== Works ==
- Famous Sports Moments, Associated Features (New York, NY), 1958.
- Contributor to Best Sports Stories, Dutton

== Recognition ==
- International Jewish Sports Hall of Fame
- Grantland Rice Award of the Sportsmen Brotherhood
- James J. Walker Award
- New York Track Writers Association Award
- Nat Fleischer Award for Excellence in Boxing Journalism
- National Track and Field Hall of Fame
