= Bernard Fernandez (journalist) =

American sports journalist

- Born: September 21, 1947; New Orleans, Louisiana, U.S.
- Occupation: Sportswriter, author
- Period: 1969 - 2012 (retired)

Bernard Fernandez (born September 21, 1947) is an American sportswriter and author from New Orleans, Louisiana. He is an inductee into the International Boxing Hall of Fame’s Class of 2020, in the Observer category. Fernandez was a newspaper sportswriter for 43 years before retiring in 2012 after 28 years with Philadelphia Daily News. He is a native of New Orleans, and a long-time resident of Drexel Hill, Pennsylvania, who now splits his time between his hometown and his adopted hometown. A five-term president of the Boxing Writers Association of America, he has been inducted into the Pennsylvania (2005), New Jersey (2013), Atlantic City (2018) and International (2020) Boxing Halls of Fame. He also is a recipient of the Nat Fleischer Award (1998) for Excellence in Boxing Journalism and the Barney Nagler Award (2015) for Long and Meritorious Service to Boxing.

== Publications ==
Fernandez wrote for the Philadelphia Daily News from 1984 - 2012. He has also written for "The Ring" magazine, RingTV.com, TheSweetScience.com, Maxboxing.com, and Sherdog.com. Fernandez also authored "Championship Rounds" with a foreword written by George Foreman in 2020, a collection of 35 of his most popular boxing articles and "Championship Rounds Vol. 2".

== Early life and education ==
Bernard Fernandez was the only child born to Bernard “Jack” Fernandez Sr. and Alice Arseneaux Fernandez. His father was a World War II Navy veteran of the Pacific theater, former professional boxer, and longtime New Orleans police officer. After winning a citywide essay contest for eighth-grade students at Catholic elementary schools in New Orleans in 1961, Bernard was advised by his principal, a nun, that he had a gift for writing and should consider journalism as a career. He graduated from De La Salle High School in 1965 and studied journalism at Louisiana State University in Baton Rouge. His first newspaper job was as a copy boy in the sports department of the Times-Picayune (New Orleans) the summer before his senior year at De La Salle, during which he got his first newspaper bylines covering American Legion baseball games. He was hired as the sports editor of the Houma Courier in August 1969, a month before his 22nd birthday. The Courier won several statewide awards for sports coverage under his leadership before he went on to be on the sports staffs of the Miami Herald, Jackson (Mississippi) Daily News, Pittsburgh Post-Gazette and, for the last 28 years of his 43-year newspaper career, the Philadelphia Daily News, where his principal beats were boxing and Penn State football. At various points he served as president of the Mississippi Sports Writers Association and Boxing Writers Association of America, and he made appearances in three boxing-themed movies: 2016’s “Rocky Balboa,” in which he had a speaking role and played himself, as well as 1999’s “Play It to the Bone” and 2011’s “Real Steel.”

== Awards and honors ==
- In addition to the International Boxing Hall of Fame, is an inductee into the Pennsylvania (2005), New Jersey (2013) and Atlantic City (2018) Boxing Halls of Fame.
- Boxing Writers Association of America Nat Fleischer Award in 1998 for Career Excellence in Boxing Journalism.
- Boxing Writers Association of America Barney Nagler Award in 2015 for Long and Meritorious Service to Boxing.
- The Boxing Writers Association of America’s writing contest awards were renamed “The Bernies” in his honor in June 2012.
- Winner of two first-place and one second-place awards in the national Associated Press Sports Editors (APSE) contest, in addition to three other top 10 finishes.
- Through 2020 the recipient of 108 national, regional, state and local writing and public service awards.
