= Sam Farmer =

American sportswriter

Sam Farmer is an American sportswriter for the Los Angeles Times. He was the 2019 Dick McCann Memorial Award recipient.

== Career ==
Farmer graduated from La Cañada High School in 1984 and from Occidental College in 1988. He spent five seasons as the Oakland Raiders beat writer for the San Jose Mercury News before moving to the Times.

The Los Angeles Times has been Farmer's home since 2000. He began his tenure with heavy focus on the NFL as a whole and developed relationships with owners, players and figures of the league from the unbiased position of a sportswriter with no home team.

Farmer has covered the NFL since 1994 and has been with the Los Angeles Times since 2000. He won praise for his work chronicling the National Football League's return to Los Angeles following the 1995 departure of the Raiders and Rams, and culminating with the return of the Rams and Chargers. He was named the California Sportswriter of the Year by the National Sportscasters and Sportswriters Association in 2016 and 2019, and in 2019, he received the Dick McCann Memorial Award from the Pro Football Hall of Fame.
