= John Biever =

American photographer

- Occupation: Photographer

John Biever is an American photographer. He is the only photographer to have photographed all 60 Super Bowl games.

== See also ==
- Never Miss a Super Bowl Club
