= Dave Goldberg (writer) =

David Goldberg (died February 8, 2015) was an American sportswriter who spent the majority of his career with the Associated Press.

== Career ==
Goldberg attended Williams College and Stanford University and was hired by the Associated Press in 1968 as New Jersey state house correspondent. He later served as news editor, the assistant bureau chief in Chicago, and supervisor on the general news desk in New York before becoming a features writer. In 1982, he moved to the AP's sports desk.

During his tenure as a sports editor, he covered baseball, football, and the Pan-American Games. Covering the NFL, Goldberg used his experience as a political reporter to cover the NFL strikes in 1987 and 2011, as well as the USFL-NFL trial. He retired in 2009.

== Awards and honors ==
Goldberg was posthumously honored with the Dick McCann Memorial Award from the Pro Football Hall of Fame in 2015, having been selected four months after his death.
