= Times-Herald =

Times-Herald or Times Herald may refer to the following newspapers:

- Times-Herald based in Forrest City, Arkansas since 1870.
- The Times Herald, based in Port Huron, Michigan
- The Times Herald (Norristown, Pennsylvania)
- Times Herald-Record, based in Middletown, New York
- Dallas Times Herald, based in Dallas, Texas, now defunct
- Newnan Times-Herald, based in Newnan, Georgia
- Olean Times Herald, based in Olean, New York
- Vallejo Times Herald, based in Vallejo, California
- Washington Times-Herald, based in Washington, D.C., now defunct
- Washington Times Herald (Indiana), based in Washington, Indiana
