= Ed Rumill =

American sportswriter (1910–1987)

Edwin Miller Rumill (September 28, 1910 – September 15, 1987) was a prominent sportswriter in the Boston area covering baseball for over 40 years. He served as president of the Baseball Writers' Association of America and was the official scorer for the 1961 World Series.

Rumill was born in Newton, Massachusetts to Edwin H. and Laura M. Rumill. Rumill played amateur baseball in the Boston Park League. Writing under the byline Ed Rumill, he was one of the few baseball writers in the 1930s and 1940s to tour the major league teams during spring training. He covered every World Series from 1930 through 1972. A member of the Baseball Writers' Association of America, he wrote articles and editorials for The Christian Science Monitor from 1932 until his retirement in 1972. Rumill mostly covered the Boston Red Sox and Boston Braves. His photograph can be seen in the Boston Red Sox version of the official 1946 World Series Program. He also wrote for The Sporting News for several years.

Rumill was the official scorer at Fenway Park for twenty-five years and Braves Field for three years. In 1961 he was elected president of the Baseball Writers' Association of America and was the official scorer for the 1961 World Series between the Cincinnati Reds and New York Yankees. He also covered the first major league players inducted into the Baseball Hall of Fame in 1936.

Rumill was close friends with both Ted Williams and Tom Yawkey, and would often act as a middleman for the other sportswriters with Williams, who notoriously didn't get along with most sportswriters. Williams later said in his autobiography that Rumill was one of the only writers he would confide in.

After retirement, Rumill lived in Sun Lakes, Arizona. He died on 18 September 1987 at Chandler Health Center in Chandler, Arizona. He was survived by his wife Juliette. Ben Bradlee Jr. wrote that despite the Monitor not being known for sportswriting, Rumill had been respected and influential in the field.
