= Jack Hand =

American sportswriter

Jack Jefferson Hand (September 25, 1912 – May 6, 1995) was an American sports reporter for the Associated Press (AP) from 1943 to 1971. His work included coverage of the Olympic Games, the World Series, championship boxing, and the first Super Bowl. He was given the Nat Fleischer Award by the Boxing Writers Association of America in 1975 for excellence in boxing journalism. After retiring from the AP, Hand was an information and editorial coordinator for the National Football League (NFL) and later was a consultant and contributor to the NFL's weekly GameDay program (now known as Sunday NFL Countdown).

Hand was a graduate of Hamilton College in New York. He began his journalism career for The Binghamton Sun in his hometown of Binghamton, New York and broadcast games of the Binghamton Triplets minor league baseball team. He died aged 82 on May 6, 1995, in his home in New Milford, Pennsylvania.
