= Selena Roberts =

American author and sportswriter (born 1966)

Selena Roberts (born May 16, 1966 in Live Oak, Florida) is an American author and sportswriter. Previously, she was a senior writer for Sports Illustrated and a columnist for The New York Times. Roberts began her career as a beat writer for the Minnesota Vikings at the Minneapolis Star Tribune and for the Orlando Magic and Tampa Bay Buccaneers at the Orlando Sentinel. She received a B.A. degree in journalism from Auburn University in 1988 where she was a sports editor for the university paper The Plainsman. She also made frequent appearances on the ESPN talk show The Sports Reporters. In a February 7, 2009 article on SI.com that quickly made the cover of Sports Illustrated, Roberts revealed that Yankees third baseman Alex Rodriguez tested positive for steroids in 2003.

== Alex Rodriguez biography ==
Roberts' book, A-Rod: The Many Lives of Alex Rodriguez, was released in 2009. The biography links the slugger's tabloid-like fame and use of performance-enhancing drugs with an unquenchable desire for attention, and his father, Victor, who abandoned him at ten years old. The book reported that Rodriguez used performance-enhancing drugs in high school, relying on questionable sources, and delved into reports that Rodriguez used PEDs with the New York Yankees and tipped pitches to opposing players. The book received widespread media attention before it was released.

== Duke lacrosse case ==
On March 31, 2006, Roberts was one of the first to report on the Duke lacrosse case. Roberts criticized the university as well as the team for a culture that prohibited "snitching" on the later exonerated lacrosse players. Accusations of sexism and racism followed in later articles. The falsely accused players were cleared of any wrongdoing and the lead prosecutor Mike Nifong was disbarred. Roberts has never admitted wrongdoing nor has she apologized for her remarks.
