= Norm Miller (writer) =

American journalist (1917–2005)

Norm Miller (October 28, 1917 – July 14, 2005) was an American sportswriter best known as the New York Giants beat writer for the New York Daily News. He was awarded the Dick McCann Memorial Award by the Pro Football Hall of Fame in 1981.
