= Walter Iooss =

American photographer (born 1943)

Walter Iooss Jr.
- Born: September 15, 1943 (age 83); Temple, Texas
- Occupation: Photographer
- Years active: 1968–present
- Spouse: Eva Iooss
- Children: 2

Walter Iooss Jr. (/ˈjoʊs/ YOHSS; born September 15, 1943) is an American photographer noted for his images of athletes, including Michael Jordan, Kelly Slater, Tiger Woods, Scottie Pippen, and Muhammad Ali. He has been called "the poet laureate of sports."

Iooss began his career shooting for Sports Illustrated and contributed to the magazine for more than 50 years. He also photographed for the magazine's Swimsuit Issue for 40 years. Bruce Silverstein Gallery exclusively represents Iooss' fine art photography.

== Birth and early life ==
Born in Temple, Texas, Walter Iooss moved at the age of five from Temple to East Orange, New Jersey. In 1959, at the age of 16, he shot his first roll of film at a professional football game with a camera his father bought him. The following year he attended the German School of Photography in New York City during the summer. One year later, at the age of 17 years, Walter got his first assignment from Sports Illustrated—-the same year he graduated from East Orange High School. Two years later he shot his first cover for Sports Illustrated, but five more years would bring about a change of pace for Walter. Contrary to the sports images that he had been shooting, he then became an in-house photographer for Atlantic Records. In 2004 he was awarded with the LUCIE Lifetime Achievement Award for Sports Photography.

== Career 1968– ==
From 1968 through 1972, Iooss was an in-house photographer for Atlantic Records in New York, where his subjects included performers like James Brown, Jimi Hendrix and Janis Joplin.

In 1982, Iooss was recruited by Fujifilm to work on an extended study of athletes who were working their way to the 1984 Summer Olympics in Los Angeles. The two-and-a-half-year project required him to leave his position on the staff of Sports Illustrated (though he continued to contribute) and resulted in the publication of the book Shooting for the Gold.

In the late 1980s, Iooss was commissioned to photograph advertising campaigns for Camel cigarettes.

In 1993, Iooss' work was featured on 27 baseball cards in an Upper Deck set dubbed "The Iooss Collection."

Though he has worked with athletes and models, Iooss has also photographed Cuban children playing ball in the street and captured the raw desire of Thai kickboxers. According to Iooss, "The real joy of photography is these moments. I'm always looking for freedom, the search for the one-on-one. That's when your instincts come out."

== Awards and nominations ==
- 2004: Lucie award for Outstanding Achievement in Sports Photography.

== Personal ==
Iooss is married to Eva Iooss, with whom he has two sons, Christian and Bjorn.

== Bibliography ==
- Heaven, Sports Illustrated, 2010 ISBN 1-60320-116-5
- Athlete, Sports Illustrated, 2008 ISBN 1-60320-008-8
- Walter Iooss: A Lifetime Shooting Sports & Beauty, Watson-Guptill, 1999 ISBN 1-888001-56-9
- Hoops: Four Decades of the Pro Game, Harry N. Abrams Inc., 2005 ISBN 0-8109-5921-6
- Rare Air: Michael on Michael, Collins, 1993 ISBN 0-00-638256-8
- Drumm, Russell (1999). Still Magic. Walter Iooss: A Lifetime Shooting Sports & Beauty. Graphis Press. ISBN 1-888001-56-9.
