= Bob Roesler =

American sportswriter (1927–2021)

Robert H. Roesler (October 5, 1927 – February 22, 2021) was an American sportswriter who spent four decades covering sports for the New Orleans Times-Picayune.

== Career ==
Roesler joined the New Orleans Times-Picayune's sports department in 1949 following his discharge from the United States Navy, where he served in the Korean War. He was promoted to sports editor in 1964 and executive sports editor in 1980. Roesler was considered instrumental in bringing Super Bowl IV to New Orleans in 1971.

== Awards and honors ==
Roesler was a charter member of the Press Club of New Orleans and was given the organization's Lifetime Achievement Award in 1995. In 1997 he was selected as the recipient of the Dick McCann Memorial Award from the Pro Football Hall of Fame.
