= Dick Connor =

American sportswriter (1930–1992)

Richard James Connor (June 30, 1930-December 30, 1992) was an American sportswriter who was best known for his time covering sports in Colorado.

== Career ==
Connor began his career with the Rocky Mountain News from 1961 to 1964, (returning from 1982 to 1988) before moving to the Denver Post in 1965. He spent a decade covering the Denver Broncos.

== Awards and honors ==
Connor was named Colorado Sportswriter of the Year 22 times and was inducted into the National Sportscasters and Sportswriters Association Hall of Fame in April 1992. He also received the Lowell Thomas Journalist of the Year Award in 1987 from Denver's chapter of Sigma Delta Chi.

In 1991, he was named the Dick McCann Memorial Award winner for excellence in football writing from the Hall of Fame.

He is the namesake of the Dick Connor Award from the Pro Football Writers of America.
