= Wallace Matthews =

American sports journalist (born 1957)

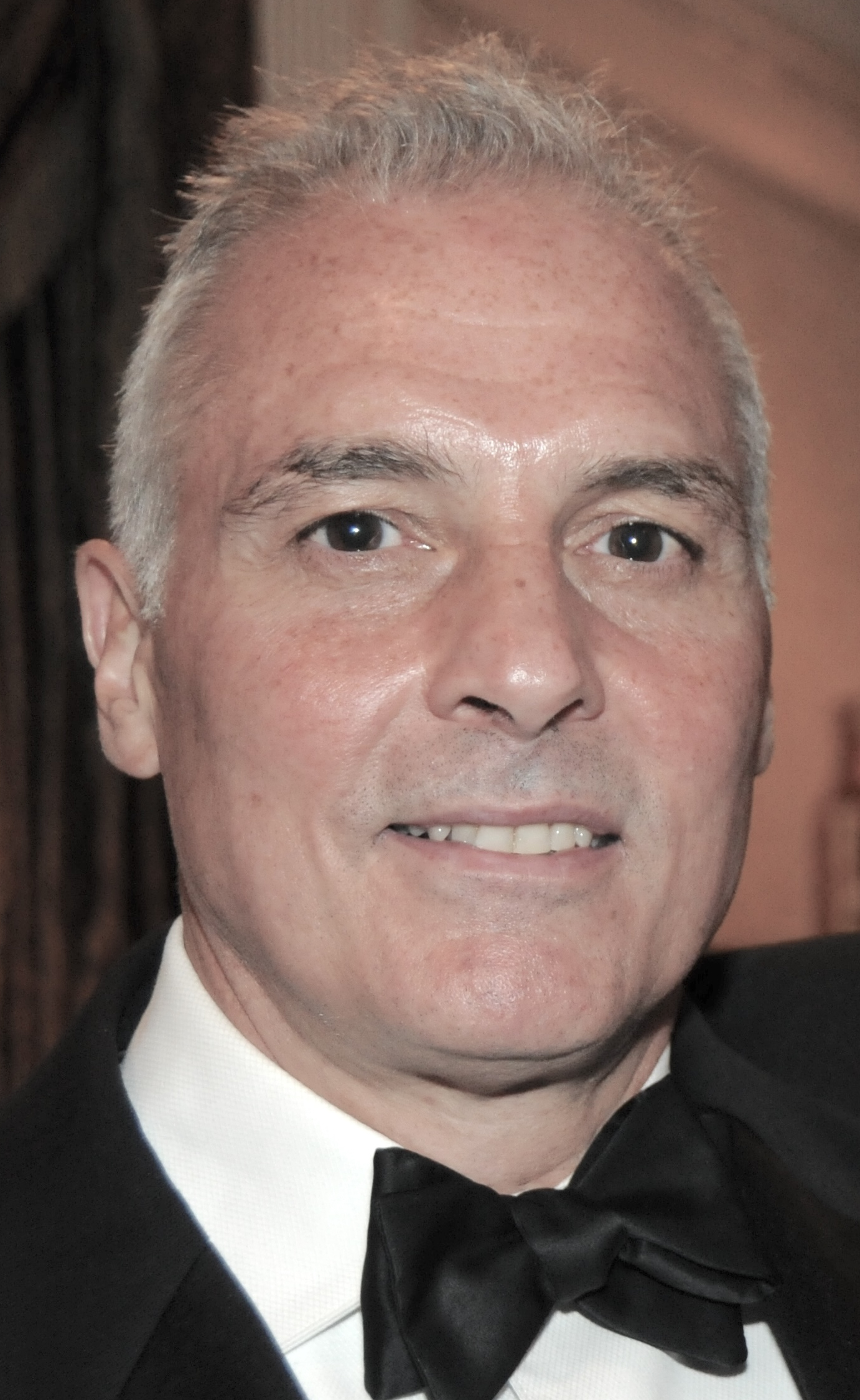
- Matthews in 2010
- Born: January 3, 1957 (age 69); Astoria, NY, U.S.
- Other name: Wally Matthews
- Education: LIU Post
- Occupations: Sports journalist, television host
- Employer(s): Newsday; The New York Post; ESPN Radio; ESPN.com; The New York Times; New York Daily News; Yahoo! Sports; Stony Brook University
- Honours: International Boxing Hall of Fame; President Boxing Writers Association of America 1989-1992

Wallace A. Matthews (born January 3, 1957) is an American journalist and sportscaster based in New York City. He has covered professional boxing, baseball, the NFL, the NHL, the NBA, thoroughbred horse racing, and professional tennis for newspapers, television networks and on radio since 1983. He was a columnist at Newsday, the New York Daily News, ESPN.com, Yahoo! Sports and the New York Post. In 2024 he was inducted into the International Boxing Hall of Fame.

== Early life ==
Wallace Matthews was born in Astoria, NY. The family moved to Plainview, NY on Long Island in 1962. He attended Plainview-Old Bethpage H.S., graduating in 1975. His interest in boxing was inspired by his father, an avid boxing fan, who gifted Wallace and his younger brother, Steven, with two pairs of boxing gloves when they were children.

Matthews’ interest in boxing continued through his teenage years, and in 1976 he began training in Brooklyn at the Izzy Zerling. Youth Center on Church Ave. He entered the New York Daily News Golden Gloves in January 1977, compiling a record of 3–1 with three knockouts as a middleweight in that year's tournament. He continued boxing in amateur tournaments for the next 30 years, competing most recently in a charity tournament on Long Island in 2007.

Matthews enrolled at C.W. Post University in 1980, majoring in journalism. He was hired by Newsday as a part-time employee in September 1983 and was promoted to full-time reporter in June 1985.

== Career ==
=== Newsday ===
Matthews began his career taking high school football scores over the phone as a part-time worker for Newsday in 1983. His interest in and practical knowledge of professional boxing earned him many fill-in assignments over the next two years, and he was hired as a full-time general assignment sports writer in 1985. His first major assignment was the middleweight title fight between Marvelous Marvin Hagler and Thomas Hearns in 1985, backing up colleague Greg Logan, and took over as the lead boxing writer later that year, beginning with the heavyweight title fight between Larry Holmes and Michael Spinks in Sept. 1985.

Over the next decade, Matthews covered major fights involving Hagler, Hearns, Sugar Ray Leonard, Roberto Duran, Evander Holyfield, Mark Breland, Pernell Whitaker, Buddy McGirt and Meldrick Taylor. He made national headlines in 1988 with an exclusive story detailing actress Robin Givens’ allegations of domestic abuse at the hands of then-heavyweight champion Mike Tyson. Matthews also covered Tyson's trial and conviction for the rape of beauty pageant contestant Desiree Washington in 1992. Later that year, he was promoted to general sports columnist.

While working at Newsday, Matthews was elected president of the Boxing Writers Association of America, a position he held for four years, and in 1994 was awarded the organization's Nat Fleischer Award for Excellence in Boxing Journalism

=== New York Post ===
Matthews left Newsday to become the lead sports columnist for the New York Post in April 1994. While there, he wrote columns about the New York Rangers winning their first Stanley Cup since 1940, about the New York Knicks’ unsuccessful title quests in 1994 and 1999, George Foreman’s regaining of the heavyweight title by KO over Michael Moorer in 1994, as well as the Yankees four World Series championships, the New York Giants loss to the Baltimore Ravens in Super Bowl XXXV, as well as nine Kentucky Derbies. In 1996, he was named one of the Top Ten columnists in the United States by the Associated Press Sports Editors.

Matthews left the Post in May 2002 in a censorship dispute over a column he wrote criticizing a colleague who had implied in a gossip column that New York Mets catcher Mike Piazza was gay.

=== ESPN Radio ===
Matthews hosted a drive-time sports talk radio show on ESPN Radio, “Wally and the Keeg,’’ from May 2002-April 2005 with Tom Keegan, who had been a colleague at the New York Post.

=== Newsday ===
After the cancellation of the radio show, Matthews returned to Newsday as a general assignment reporter but within months was promoted to lead general sports columnist, a position he held until April 2010.

=== ESPN.com ===
Matthews left Newsday in April 2010 to become the New York Yankees beat writer for ESPNNewYork.com, a start-up regional sports site. He and his colleague Andrew Marchand provided irreverent and in-depth coverage of Derek Jeter’s retirement tour, the Biogenesis scandal involving Alex Rodriguez, and A-Rod's tumultuous final season as a Yankee.

=== The New York Times ===
Matthews served as the back-up baseball writer on both Yankees and Mets games for the New York Times from March 2017 to October 2018. Following an incident in which a two-year-old child was nearly killed by a foul ball in Yankee Stadium, Matthews wrote several influential stories stressing the need for expanded netting in Major League ballparks, a practice that was adopted league-wide by the 2018 All-Star Break. Matthews also covered boxing for The New York Times.

=== New York Daily News ===
Matthews was hired as the lead sports columnist for the New York Daily News, the paper he grew up reading on a daily basis, in October 2018.

=== Yahoo! Sports ===
Matthews left the Daily News when he was recruited by Yahoo! Sports to serve as the lead columnist for the Flushing Meadows Baseball Club, a proposed subscription-based site covering the New York Mets. The site never got off the ground due to contractual problems between Yahoo, the Mets and MLB and Matthews was reassigned as a general sports columnist in September of that year. By October, Yahoo opted to lay off the entire staff that had been hired to create the subscription site.

=== Television work ===
While covering boxing for Newsday, Matthews was hired by NBC Sports to serve as the in-ring interviewer for its boxing coverage at the 1988 Seoul Olympics. Matthews was acclaimed for his aggressive interviewing style and was prominent in NBC's coverage of Roy Jones’ controversial loss to a Korean boxer in the Gold medal match, as well as several other incidents in a controversy-filled Olympics.

Over the next two decades, Matthews provided color commentary for fights on ESPN, Showtime, CBS Sports, SportsChannel America and Versus. He was a frequent guest on boxing themed programs and was prominent in the two-part series about Mike Tyson aired on ABC in 2021.

=== Radio and podcast work ===
In addition to his ESPN radio show, Matthews has served as the host of “Going the Distance,’’ a weekly boxing show on SiriusXM along with Teddy Atlas and Nabate Isles. He also hosted “Ball and Strikes,’’ a weekly baseball call-in show on ESPN Radio in 2016 and in 2017, co-hosted “New York/New York,’’ a baseball podcast reporting on the Yankees and Mets with Dan Cannobbio.

=== Stony Brook University ===
Starting in 2019 Matthews began serving as an adjunct professor of sports journalism at Stony Brook University. He taught for two years before the COVID-19 pandemic ended in-person study.

=== New York State Department of Health ===
In May 2020, Matthews trained to become a contact tracer at New York State Department of Health as part of New York State's COVID-19 Initiative. His duties included contacting and interviewing by phone individuals who had come into contact with a COVID-19 patient and advising them of quarantine protocols. In September 2020 Matthews was promoter to team supervisor, and in November 2020 to Case Investigation Supervisor, overseeing a team of 15. He remained in that position until the initiative ended in March 2022.

=== Huntington YMCA ===
Matthews trained for and received certification as a Group Fitness Instructor in Sept. of 2023 and soon after began working as a boxing trainer at the Huntington YMCA, utilizing a training program he created in a workout room he designed. Currently, he runs training classes six days a week.

== Other endeavors ==
Matthews has published in other sports outlets such as Forbes, New York Sportsday, The Athletic, The Washington Post, Premiere Boxing Champions, Boxing Illustrated, and others.

Co-author of “Gut Punch,’’ a book chronicling the career of Bob Gutkowski, the former president of Madison Square Garden who was instrumental in the Stanley Cup Win of the 1994 New York Rangers.

Matthews hosts a monthly program of themed movies at the independent Cinema Arts Centre in Huntington, NY

Matthews is the author of "Boxing for Dummies" (2026) an introduction to boxing techniques training methods equipment and fitness.

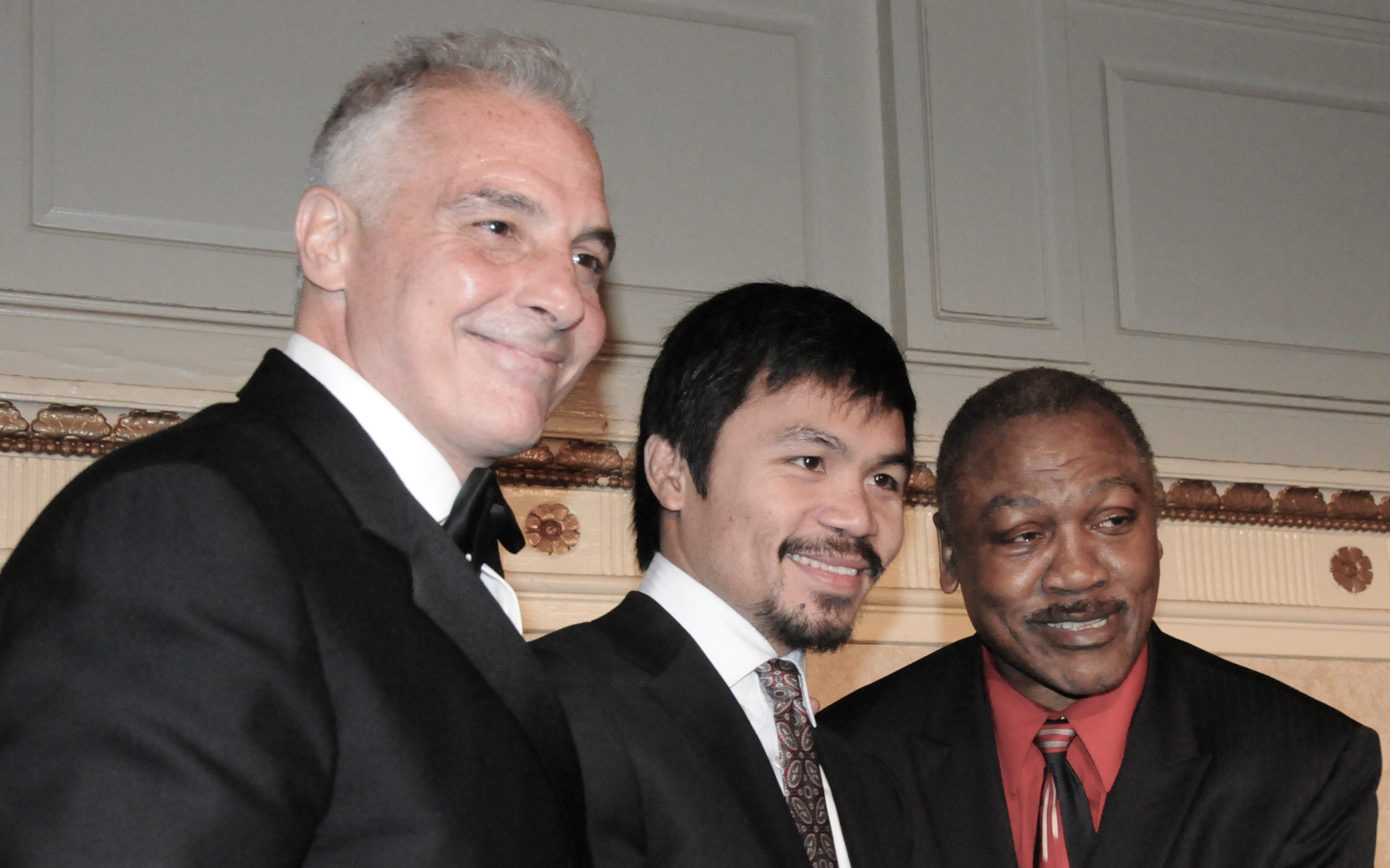
Wallace Matthews, Manny Pacquiao, and Joe Frazier at the June 2010 annual Boxing Writers Association of America Awards Dinner

== Personal life ==
Matthews has been married since 1985. He and his wife have two adult children. They reside on Long Island.

== Honors and special assignments ==
1988 Olympics boxing commentator, NBC-TV (Seoul Games)

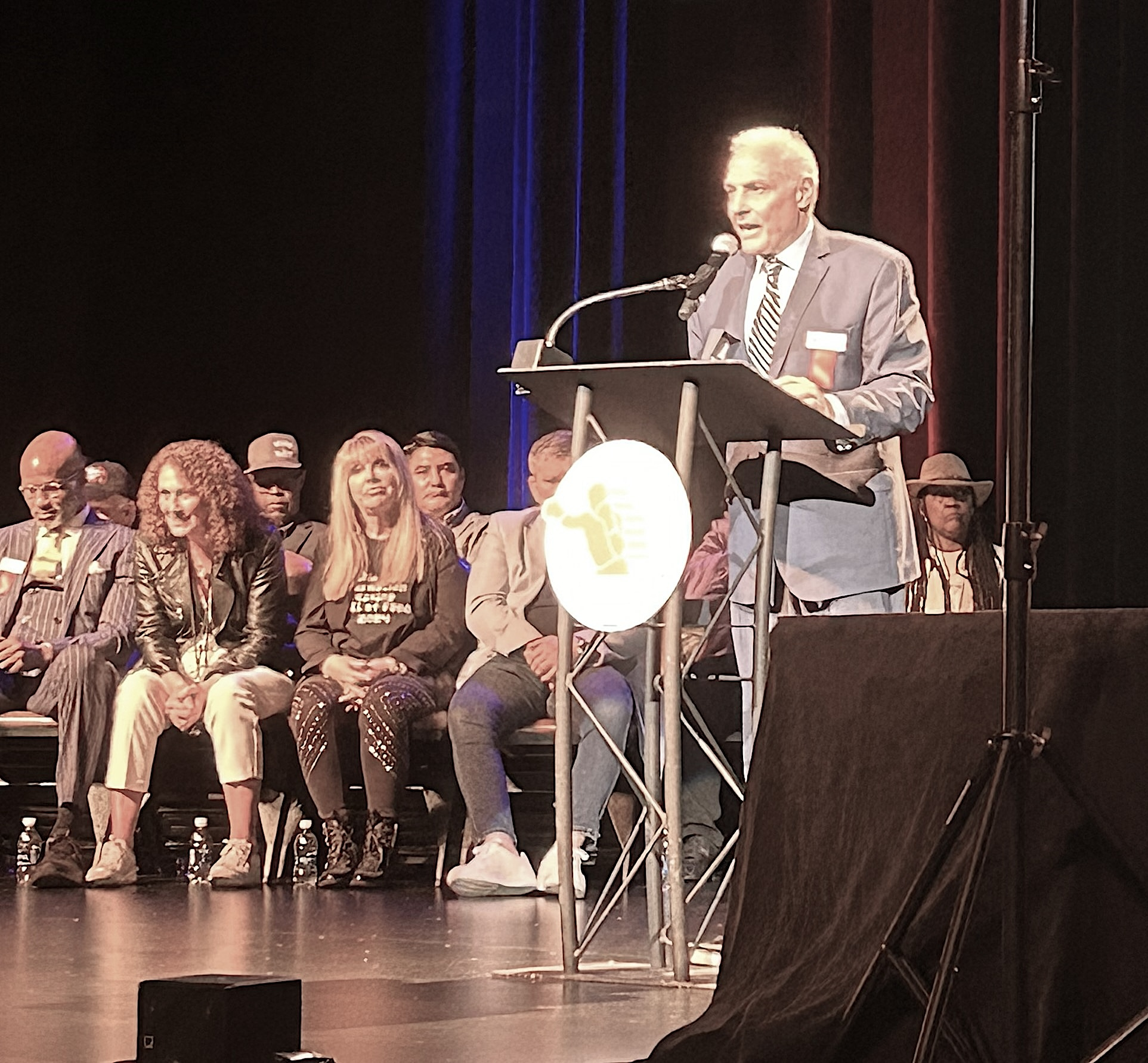
Wallace Matthews giving his 2024 International Boxing Hall of Fame induction speech

1989-1992 President of the Boxing Writers Association of America (BWAA)

1992 Olympics boxing commentator, CNBC (Barcelona Games)

1994 BWAA Nat Fleischer Award for Excellence in Boxing Journalism

1999 Testified before John McCain Senate committee on boxing reform

2010 Presented Manny Pacquiao the lifetime achievement award at the annual Boxing Writers Association of America Awards Dinner

2015 Host of “Going the Distance,’’ weekly boxing talk show on SiriusXM

2016 Host of “Balls & Strikes,’’ a weekly baseball talk show on ESPN NY 98.7 FM

2023 New York State Senate Resolution 1710 Honoring Wallace Matthews

2024 Inducted into the International Boxing Hall of Fame.

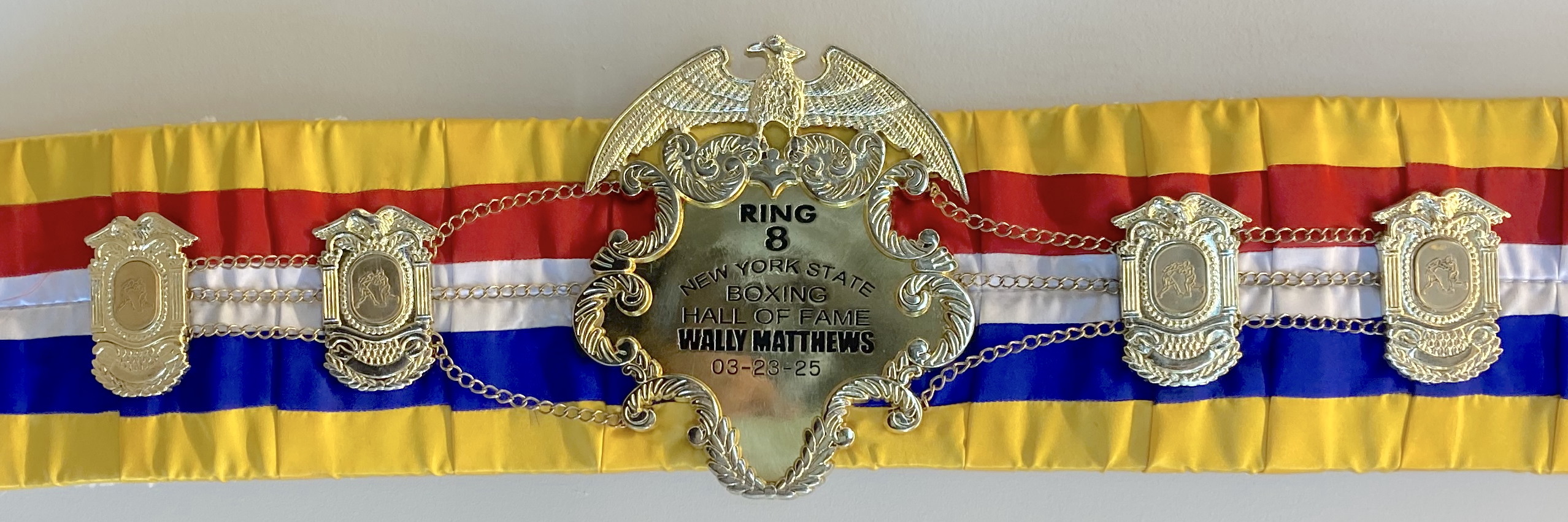
Belt given to Wallace Matthews at his 2025 induction into the New York State Boxing Hall of Fame

2025 Inducted into the Ring 8 NY State Boxing Hall of Fame
