= Len Pasquarelli =

American sportswriter

Len Pasquarelli is an American retired sportswriter, columnist and analyst who covered the National Football League (NFL) for 42 seasons. After retiring from full-time work, he served as a consultant for online sports start-ps, and also continues to write freelance feature pieces. He last worked full-time with The Sports Xchange. The Sports Xchange is a network of professional, accredited reporters and analysts who cover each team or sport full-time.

Prior to joining the Sports Xchange, he was a senior NFL reporter for ESPN.com starting in 2001 and was a frequent contributor to the other ESPN outlets, including SportsCenter, ESPNEWS, ESPN Radio and ESPN The Magazine. Before ESPN, Pasquarelli served as a senior NFL writer for CBS SportsLine.com 1999-2001. He has also covered the NFL for the Atlanta Journal-Constitution from 1989 to 1999, the Fort Wayne News-Sentinel (Indianapoiis bureau) from 1985 to 1989, Pro Football Weekly from 1982 to 1985, and Pittsburgh Steelers Weekly from 1978 to 1982.

Pasquarelli is a member of the Pro Football Writers of America, and a past president of the group. He has twice won national awards as the Best NFL Reporter of the Year. He has also won several other national writing and reporting awards, including an Associated Press first-place Deadline Sports Reporting Award in 1988, and eight PFWA writing awards.

During his career, he covered more than 900 regular- and post-season NFL games, including 33 Super Bowls, along with a pair of NCAA basketball Final Fours and the 1987 Pan-Am Games.

Pasquarelli has been on the committee that selects inductees for the Pro Football Hall of Fame. During the annual selection meeting on February 2, 2008, he fell ill and, after declining to leave the meeting until the selection voting was completed, was taken to a Phoenix area hospital. The following day, instead of covering Super Bowl XLII, he had quintuple bypass surgery. While in rehabilitation for the bypass surgery, he began to experience new symptoms five weeks later, which were subsequently diagnosed as Guillain–Barré syndrome. He was named the 2008 recipient of the Dick McCann Memorial Award for "long and distinguished contributions to the profession." In 2024, he was inducted into the Alumni Hall of Fame at his high school alma mater, Pittsburgh Central Catholic High School.

Pasquarelli is a Pittsburgh, Pennsylvania native and graduated from the University of Pittsburgh in 1972 with degrees in Journalism and Psychology. He and his wife Susan reside in Atlanta, Georgia.
