= Patricia Babcock-McGraw =

American sportswriter

Patricia Babcock-McGraw is a sportswriter for the Daily Herald, a color analyst/sideline reporter for the Chicago Sky, and a women's college basketball analyst for the Big Ten Network.

She was named Indiana Miss Basketball during her senior year in high school (in 1990) and was a three-time all-state selection. She ended her high school career with 2,199 points, the second all-time leading scorer in state history. Her career high-school averages were 26.8 points, 13.2 rebounds, and 3.6 blocks per game. She graduated from Northwestern University among career leaders in points (1,353), rebounds (813) and FG% (.546). She was a two time all-Big Ten and two-time academic All-Big Ten selection.

She was inducted into the Indiana Basketball Hall of Fame in 2017.
