= Bob Glauber =

American football writer for Newsday

Bob Glauber is an American retired football writer for Newsday. In 2011 and 2015, Glauber was selected by the National Sports Media Association as the New York State sportswriter of the year. Glauber served as the president of the Pro Football Writers of America from 2018-20 after previously serving as its Vice President

== Life and career ==
Glauber was raised in White Plains, New York. Glauber was a sports reporter for The Journal News before he joined Newsday in 1989. While at Newsday, Glauber initially covered the New York Giants and New York Jets for 2 years before moving on to become Newsday's national football columnist starting in 1992. In 1993, Glauber became a national football columnist at The Sporting News for three years before devoting himself entirely to Newsday. Glauber has also been a guest panelists on ESPN's Around the Horn. Glauber also has dabbled in sports radio, appearing as one of the panelists on 'Around the NFL' with Bob Berger and Bruce Murray. Glauber recently wrote a book Guts and Genius: The Story of Three Unlikely Coaches Who Came to Dominate the NFL in the '80s which was released in November 2018. This book details how Bill Walsh, Joe Gibbs, and Bill Parcells impacted the National Football League forever.

Glauber was a member of the 13-person panel that selected the Top 100 Players in Giants history.
