= Vincent O. Carter =

African American writer

Vincent O. Carter was an African American writer who for most of his adult life lived in Bern, Switzerland. His best-known work is the autobiographical The Bern Book: A Record of a Voyage of the Mind.

== Life ==
Vincent O.Carter was born in 1924 in Kansas City, Missouri, where he grew up in poverty. As a young man he was drafted into the US Army and was deployed in France. After the war, the G. I. Bill gave him the opportunity to study at Lincoln University in Pennsylvania and he also spent a year at Wayne State University in Detroit, while, at the same time, working as a cook for the Union Pacific Railroad and for a Detroit auto manufacturer. After finishing his degree, he returned to Europe where, in the mid-1950s, and after extended stays in Paris, Munich and Amsterdam, he finally settled down in the Swiss de facto capital Bern. There he wrote most of his works, painted and worked as an English teacher. He died in Bern on January 23, 1983.

He was posthumously awarded an honorary doctorate from Lincoln University, PA in 2025.

== Writing ==
The Bern Book, completed in 1957, yet only published in the US in 1973 under the title The Bern Book: A Record of a Voyage of the Mind is a sharply observed, autobiographical narrative describing the city, its inhabitants and their reaction to a black foreigner living among them. A German translation was published in Switzerland in 2021.

He is also the author of Such Sweet Thunder, which narrates the story of a boy growing up in the segregated Kansas City during the 1920s and 1930s. This book, while completed in 1963, was only published in 2003.

== Works ==
- The Bern Book. A Record of a Voyage of the Mind. John Day Co., New York 1973, ISBN 0381982378
  - Reissued as The Bern Book by the Dalkey Archive Press, 2020, ISBN 9781628973167
  - Meine weisse Stadt und ich. Das Bernbuch. Translated into German by Pociao and Roberto de Hollanda. Limmat Verlag, Zurich 2021, ISBN 9783039260096
- Such Sweet Thunder. Steerforth Press, South Royalton 2003, ISBN 9781586420581

== Literature ==
- Darryl Pinckney: Out There: Mavericks of Black Literature. Basic Civitas Books, New York 2002, ISBN 0465057608.
