= Bill Wallace (sportswriter) =

American sportswriter (1924–2012)

William N. Wallace (April 29, 1924 – August 11, 2012) was an American sportswriter for The New York Times.

== Early life ==
Wallace was born in Washington, D.C. and graduated from Yale University in 1945 after serving in World War II. At Yale, he was a catcher on the baseball team.

== Career ==
Wallace was hired by the World-Telegram as a yachting writer and in 1957 joined the New York Herald Tribune, where he began his football writing career in 1959. He joined The New York Times after the newspaper strike of 1962–63. During his career he covered both the New York Giants and New York Jets. He is the author of the book Yale’s Ironmen: A Story of Football and Lives in the Decade of the Depression and Beyond.

In 1986, he was given the Dick McCann Memorial Award from the Pro Football Hall of Fame.

== Personal life ==
He was married to Linda De Refler.
