= Ira Miller =

Ira Miller is an American former sportswriter who is best known for his almost 29-year tenure as a football writer for the San Francisco Chronicle.

== Career ==
Miller covered both the San Francisco 49ers and the Oakland Raiders during his career. He also served as President of the Pro Football Writers of America.

== Awards and honors ==
Miller is the 1993 winner of the Dick McCann Memorial Award from the Pro Football Hall of Fame.
