= Artillery Park (baseball) =

Former ballpark in Kingston, Pennsylvania

Coordinates: 41.252586°N 75.892755°W

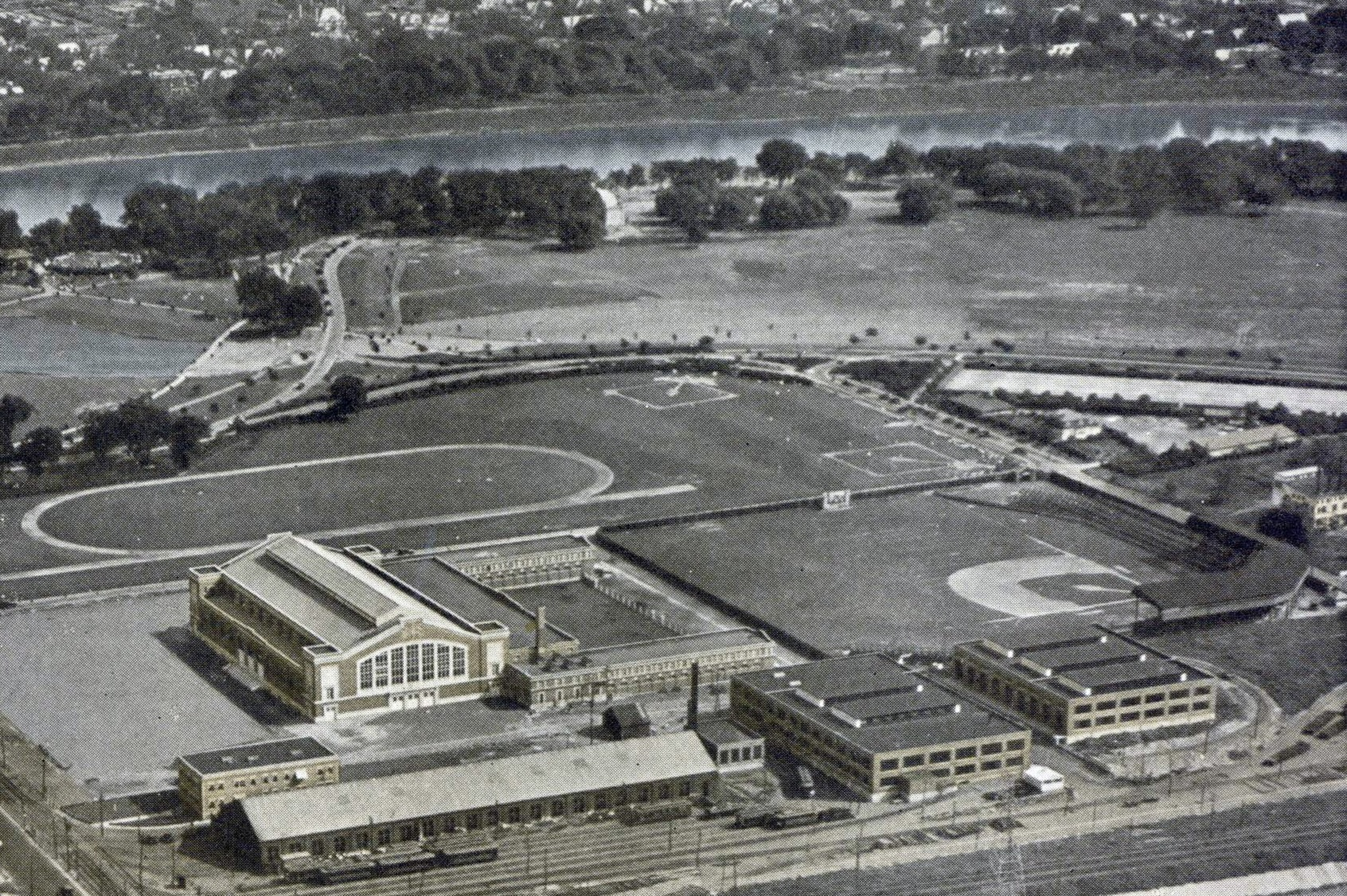
- Artillery Park with 109th Field Artillery Armory beyond left field (1929)
- Interactive map of Artillery Park
- Location: Kingston, Pennsylvania
- Capacity: 3,500 (1925-1955)
- Surface: grass
- Field size: Left – 337 ft. Center – 490 ft. Right – 354 ft. (1939)

Construction
- Opened: May 5,1925
- Renovated: 2014
- Architect: Thomas H. Atherton

Tenants
- Wilkes-Barre Barons (NYPL) (1925-1937); Wilkes-Barre Barons (EL) (1938-1947); Wilkes-Barre Indians (EL) (1948-1951); Wilkes-Barre Barons (EL) (1953–1955); Wilkes University Colonels (Landmark Conference) (1940s-2019)

Artillery Park is a baseball field in Kingston, a suburb of Wilkes-Barre, Pennsylvania on the campus of Wilkes University and named for its proximity to the 109th Field Artillery Armory. It was built for baseball in 1925, was the home to minor league baseball in Wilkes-Barre from 1925 until 1955, and could accommodate as many as 6,000 fans. The Wilkes College Colonels played at the field from the 1940s until 2019. The grandstand was razed after the departure of the Eastern League Wilkes-Barre Barons.

== History ==
Artillery Field was designed by Wilkes-Barré architect Thomas H. Atherton Jr who also designed the Kingston Armory beyond the ballpark's left field wall as well as multiple commercial buildings and residences in Wiles-Barré and the surrounding area.

The ballpark's seated capacity was 3,500, and would draw as many as 6,000 for big games. Barons attendance numbered 147,000 for 68 games during the 1927 season.

It was the location of Babe Ruth's longest home run in 1926. A kiosk describing Ruth's visit and homerun at the ballpark was erected in 2012.

On the night of July 16, 1928, under four floodlights and 40 1,000-watt light bulbs, Philadelphia's future Hall-of-Famer Tommy Loughran defended his light heavyweight boxing title in ten rounds against the former welterweight champion, Pete Latzo at Artillery Park. Seating capacity was expanded to 15,000 for the fight although only 10,000 attended after rain left the park wet and muggy.

Declining attendance in early 1955 led to a warning that the Wilkes-Barre Barons would relocate should it not increase. It was announced on June 25, 1955 that the club would move to Johnston, Pennsylvania. The Barons played their final game at Artillery Park on June 29, 1955 losing 11-8 to Albany before 649 fans.

== Artillery Field ==
Artillery Field today is adjacent to and managed by Wilkes University. The field has two sets of bullpens, an outdoor batting cage, dugouts, and a press box directly behind home plate.

Wilkes College began to lease Artillery Field from the Pennsylvania National Guard for use as a baseball field in the 1940s. In 1960 and 1963, Wilkes purchased the land across Northampton Street from the baseball field from the Glen Alden Corporation.

Prior to the 2014 season, permanent fencing was installed in left to left centerfield thirty feet high and two hundred feet wide. Padded ortable fencing was installed in center and right field forty-eight inches high. A nine foot wide red stone warning track was installed in left and left centerfield.

The Wilkes University baseball team played at Artillery Park through the 2019 season before moving across the street to the renovated and expanded Ralston Sports Complex with its multipurpose artificial turf field.
