= George Strickler =

American sports writer

George Strickler (August 12, 1904 – December 8, 1976) was an American sports writer.

== Career ==
Strickler began his career as a student publicity man for Notre Dame University. He is credited with coining the term "Four Horsemen for the 1924 Fighting Irish backfield. In the late 1940s he was the assistant general manager and publicity director for the Green Bay Packers.

Strickler served as the first President of the Pro Football Writers of America from 1964 to 1965.
