= Dick Gordon (sportswriter) =

- Born: Charles Richards Gordon; January 15, 1911; St. Paul, Minnesota
- Died: December 8, 2008 (aged 97); St. Paul, Minnesota
- Other name: Scoop
- Education: Princeton University
- Occupation: Sports journalist
- Spouse: Adelaide

Charles Richards Gordon, known as Dick "Scoop" Gordon (January 15, 1911 – December 8, 2008), was an American sports journalist whose works were a regular feature in venerable sports magazines like The Sporting News, Sports Illustrated, and Baseball Digest. After earning his nickname "Scoop" in 1930 by reporting for The Daily Princetonian that golfing legend Bobby Jones would be retiring from active competition, Gordon went on to a sports reporting career that ended in 2008.

== Childhood ==
Charles Richards Gordon grew up in St. Paul, Minnesota, the son of Charles William Gordon, the proprietor of the fur clothing manufacturer Gordon & Furguson, Inc. His mother, Charlotte Bishop Gordon, was a native of Connecticut. At the time of the 1920 United States census, Gordon was living with his parents, an older sister (Virginia), and two servants at 378 Summit Avenue in St. Paul, in the home of his grandfather, Richards Gordon, a deacon of the Episcopal Church and a board member of the new "St. Paul Institute" (now the Science Museum of Minnesota). The younger Gordon attended St. Paul Academy and wrote for the school newspaper Now and Then. The school's headmaster reportedly opined that Gordon was a better writer than F. Scott Fitzgerald, who had been a student at the St. Paul Academy from 1908 to 1911.

== Princeton and early career ==
Gordon later attended Princeton University, graduating in 1933. While attending Princeton, he was a reporter for The Daily Princetonian. He received the nickname "Scoop" in 1930 for being the first to report that professional golfer Bobby Jones was retiring from the sport. After graduating from Princeton, Gordon returned to Minnesota and became a sports writer for the St. Paul Pioneer Press. In January 1939, he joined the Chicago Daily News as a sports writer.

== World War II ==
During World War II, he served in the United States Marine Corps for 26 months. He served as a Marine Combat Correspondent in the Pacific Theater of Operations. In November 1943, his story about a U.S. Army baseball team that endured six months at Guadalcanal was published in The Sporting News. After over two years of combat action, Sergeant Gordon was returned to Minneapolis and worked for a time as a U.S. Marine recruiter. On April 26, 1945, Gordon married Adelaide Washburne, a Smith graduate who had been teaching at the University of Minnesota and worked in the American Red Cross during World War II. After the war ended, Gordon returned to his job as a sports reporter for the Chicago Daily News.

== Post-war career ==
From the late 1940s through the 1970s, Gordon was one of the leading sports writers in the United States. Between 1946 and 1976, almost 250 of Gordon's works were published in The Sporting News, an American-based sports magazine established in 1886. From 1949 to 1970, Gordon's baseball writings were a recurring feature in Baseball Digest, the oldest continuously-published baseball magazine in the United States. When Sports Illustrated magazine launched in the mid-1950s, Gordon was one of the budding journal's first writers. On a daily basis, Gordon worked the sports desk for the Minneapolis Star, the Minneapolis Star Tribune, and the Villager newspapers in the Twin Cities. He wrote articles about the Minnesota Twins baseball team, the Minnesota Golden Gophers, and the Minnesota Vikings. Gordon covered the 1960 Olympics in Squaw Valley, California where the U.S. men's ice hockey team won gold. He continued to write for the Villager until he retired after a long career in early 2008.

== Family and death ==
Dick Gordon and his wife Adelaide spent 61 years together, their marriage producing three boys. Adelaide died in early 2007, and Gordon followed on December 8, 2008. Sports Illustrated, the Star Tribune and his college newspaper all reported the passing.

== Selected works ==
As an active sportswriter for almost eighty years, Gordon wrote thousands of articles on subjects ranging from baseball to hockey. The following are a small sampling of his works, listed chronologically:

- Charles (The Man) Comiskey II Gets Sox Presidency as 21st Birthday Gift, The Sporting News, November 27, 1946
- Little Brown Jug Series Good to the Last Drop, The Sporting News, October 22, 1947
- Big Gopher Ekberg Stars in Studies Too, The Sporting News, January 5, 1949
- Mickey Owen, Forgotten Man, Baseball Digest, February 1949
- Four of 13 Survivors of Duluth Bus Crash Playing a Year Later, The Sporting News, August 3, 1949
- Nomellini's the Monicker of Gophers' Lion of the Line, The Sporting News, October 19, 1949
- Mariucci by Phone: ‘We Rose to Heights; Russia Too Good’, Minneapolis Star and Tribune, January 1956
- Why He's Still Stan the Man, Baseball Digest, August 1957
- Giel's Ready to Wheel, Baseball Digest, February 1958
- Did Twin Cities Double Deals Selves Out of Big League Ball, Baseball Digest, March 1958
- The Great Cepeda, Junior, Baseball Digest, April 1958
- The Hottest Guy in Cold Storage, Baseball Digest, February 1959
- "Can Jim Gentile Keep a Hot Bat and a Cool Head for Baltimore?", Baseball Digest, March 1960
- 30-G Minimum Bonus Urged for Campus Raids, Baseball Digest, June 1960
- Headaches of a Ten-Club Team, Baseball Digest, December 1960
- Stallard - Made-to-Order Fireman, Baseball Digest, January 1961
- Challenge from Latin America, Baseball Digest, May 1961
- Should Power Bunt Winning Run to 3rd?, Baseball Digest, December 1961
- Minnesota's Double K-Rations, Baseball Digest, February 1962
- Pascual Finds It Doesn't Pay to Advertise, Baseball Digest, March 1962
- Where to Play 46 Homers, Baseball Digest, April 1962
- "The Truth about Donavan", Baseball Digest, July 1962
- In Bluege's Footsteps, Baseball Digest, September 1962
- Why the scarcity of big-name catchers?, Baseball Digest, October 1962
- Are Superstars a Vanishing Breed?, Baseball Digest, February 1963
- "How Allen Changed from Minnesota Villan to Star", Baseball Digest, March 1963
- Are Own Homers Beating Twins?, Baseball Digest, February 1964
- The Second Generation Doesn't Take First Honors, Baseball Digest, March 1964
- "More Frequently than Anyone since Ruth", Baseball Digest, May 1964
- Where There's Smokey, There's No Firing, Baseball Digest, June 1964
- "Appling or Cronin?", Baseball Digest, August 1964
- Control Confidence Conscience, Baseball Digest, April 1965
- "A Breed of New Shortstops", Baseball Digest, September 1965
- Those Odd Twins, Baseball Digest, October 1965
- "Kicking Up A Rule Change At Princeton", Sports Illustrated, November 1965
- Twin Firsts by a Twin, Baseball Digest, December 1965
- Oliva's Lifetime Mark Best Now, Baseball Digest, September 1966
- Letter Man at Minnesota, Baseball Digest, July 1967
- Twins' Lightning Rod, Baseball Digest, May 1968
- Graig Nettles - Is He a Star of the Future?, Baseball Digest, March 1969
- "Rosy Ryan Remembers...51 Years of Baseball", Baseball Digest, June 1969
- Grant Can't Stand Luxury of Emotions, The Sporting News December 6, 1969
- Crosetti Vividly Remembers Glory Years of the Yankees, Baseball Digest, September 1970
- "The Kick Football Dropped", Sports Illustrated, December 1971
- The Northern League Baseball Cradle Empty Now, Baseball Digest, July 1972
- Rookie White's Sizzling Catches Heat Up Vikes, The Sporting News, December 4, 1976
- "Boxer Billy Miske Put Up The Fight Of His Life For One Last Christmas", Sports Illustrated, December 1984
