= Nat Fleischer Award =

American boxing award

- Sport: Boxing
- Awarded for: "Excellence in Boxing Journalism"
- Location: U.S.
- Presented by: Boxing Writers Association of America

History
- First award: 1972
- First winner: Barney Nagler
- Most recent: Tom Gerbasi

The Nat Fleischer Award is an award conferred annually by the Boxing Writers Association of America (BWAA) for Excellence in Boxing Journalism. The award is named after Nat Fleischer, founder of The Ring Magazine.

== History ==
Established in 1972, the award honors Nat Fleischer, who helped found the Boxing Writers Association of America and served as its president. Voting for the Nat Fleischer Award is restricted to past honorees, while BWAA members vote on all other awards. The BWAA presents the award each year at its annual honors dinner.

The first person to receive the award was American sportswriter Barney Nagler. The first non-American recipient of the award was Hugh McIlvanney in 1986.

The late Red Smith, known for influencing a generation of writers, is among its most distinguished honorees.

== Past recipients ==
- 1972 – (United States) Barney Nagler
- 1973 – (United States) Dave Anderson
- 1974 – (United States) Jack Hand, Murray Rose
- 1975 – (United States) Red Smith
- 1976 – (United States) Jesse Abramson
- 1977 – (United States) Bob Waters
- 1978 – (United States) Jerry Izenberg
- 1979 – (United States) Ed Schuyler Jr.
- 1980 – (United States) Tom Cushman
- 1981 – (United States) Michael Katz
- 1982 – (United States) Pat Putnam
- 1983 – (United States) Vic Ziegel
- 1984 – (United States) John Schulian
- 1985 – (United States) George Kimball
- 1986 – (Scotland) Hugh McIlvaney
- 1987 – (United States) Elmer Smith
- 1988 – (United States) Tom Archdeacon
- 1989 – (United States) Jim Murray
- 1990 – (United States) Bert Sugar
- 1991 – (United States) Stan Hochman
- 1992 – (United States) Ken Jones
- 1993 – (United States) Ron Borges
- 1994 – (United States) Wallace Matthews
- 1995 – (United States) Robert Seltzer
- 1996 – (United States) Royce Feour
- 1997 – (United States) Alan Goldstein
- 1998 – (United States) Bernard Fernandez
- 1999 – (United States) Tim Dahlberg
- 2000 – (United States) Jay Searcy
- 2001 – (United States) Richard Hoffer
- 2002 – (United States) Steve Springer
- 2004 – (United States) Thomas Hauser
- 2005 – (United States) Tim Smith
- 2006 – (United States) Kevin Iole
- 2007 – (United States) Steve Sneddon
- 2008 – (United States) Norm Frauenheim
- 2009 – None
- 2010 – (United States) Steve Farhood
- 2011 – (United States) Colin Hart
- 2012 – (United States) Dave Kindred
- 2013 – (United States) Dan Rafael
- 2014 – (United States) Mark Whicker
- 2015 – (United States) William Gildea
- 2016 – (United States) Bill Dwyre
- 2017 – (United States) Michael Rosenthal
- 2018 – (United States) Thom Loverro
- 2019 – (United States) Graham Houston
- 2020 – (United States) Joe Maxse
- 2021 – (United States) Mark Kriegel
- 2022 – (United States) Lance Pugmire
- 2023 – (United States) Nigel Collins
- 2024 – (United States) Tom Gerbasi

== See also ==
- Boxing Writers Association of America
