= Stephan Regina-Thon =

American playwright, screenwriter, and critic

Stephan Regina-Thon was an American playwright, screenwriter, and critic. He was born in Miami Beach on December 2, 1946, but lived for many years in Canada, primarily in Hubbards, Nova Scotia. The name by which he was generally known, which appears in some contexts as "Stephen Regina-Thon" or "Steve Regina-Thon", was in fact a pseudonym of Stephan Allan Wiener. He returned to the United States near the end of life and died in Mansfield Center, Connecticut on October 31, 2003. He was a close friend and the sole heir of the American sociologist and scholar of education Edgar Z. Friedenberg, with whom he lived for many years in Hubbards.

His theatrical productions in the Federal Penitentiary located in Springhill, Nova Scotia attracted a measure of attention, and he also became known for his writings, during the years that followed it, that related to the war in Vietnam. "Starz, Stripes...Forever", which he described as a "dream play" (looking perhaps to invite comparisons with Strindberg or even Calderón de la Barca), was for example not so much about the war itself as it was a trenchant evocation of its emotional effects upon young American men and women. Other works include "Here and There", "Occupant", "Dot...Dot...Dot.", and "Gentle Obscenities".
