= John McClain =

American sportswriter

John McClain is an American retired sportswriter. He was the winner of the 2006 Dick McCann Memorial Award from the Pro Football Hall of Fame.

== Early life and education ==
McClain grew up in Waco, Texas and graduated from Baylor University in 1975.

== Career ==
McClain began his career writing for the Waco Tribune-Herald in 1973 before moving to the Houston Chronicle in 1976. During his career, he covered the Houston Oilers (until their move to Tennessee), the Houston Texans, and the Houston Aeros of the World Hockey Association.

He is a member of the Pro Football Hall of Fame Selection Committee, the Pro Football Hall of Fame Seniors Committee, and the Texas Sports Hall of Fame Selection Committee. He also appears on Sports Radio 610. In 2015, he was named as a Gridiron Legend in Texas.

On March 31, 2022, McClain announced his retirement from the Houston Chronicle.

On May 21, 2022, McClain was inducted into the Texas Sports Hall of Fame.

McClain also had a brief career as an actor, making a minor appearance in Harmony Korine's 2012 film Spring Breakers where he played a judge.
