= James Jerpe =

American sportswriter

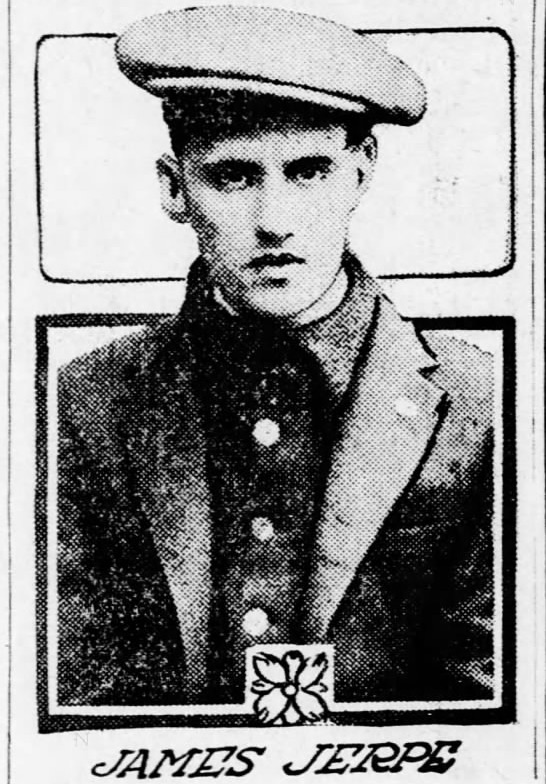
- Born: 1885; Pittsburgh, Pennsylvania, US
- Died: January 16, 1917 (aged 31); Pittsburgh, Pennsylvania, US
- Resting place: Allegheny Cemetery
- Occupation: Sportswriter
- Employer(s): Pittsburgh Dispatch; The Pittsburgh Post; The Gazette Times
- Known for: Baseball coverage

James Jerpe (1885 – January 16, 1917) was an American sports writer and columnist, writing for The Pittsburgh Dispatch, The Pittsburgh Post and The Gazette Times from 1909 until 1916.

== Early life and career ==
In 1985, Jerpe was born in Pittsburgh's Lawrenceville district to Swedish émigré Andrew H. Jerpe and his second-generation Swedish-American spouse Anna Stomberg. When his parents moved to Norfolk, Ohio in 1900, James remained behind and soon found work as a copy boy with a local paper. By no later than 1907 he was employed as a reporter, and between 1909 and 1911, he wrote for The Pittsburgh Dispatch and The Pittsburgh Post. Beginning in January 1912 and continuing through roughly September 1916, Jerpe's byline appeared on a much more regular basis in what would prove his final and, by far, best-remembered incarnation, as columnist and Pirates beat writer for The Gazette Times.

In 1915, during the Pirates' first east coast trip, Jerpe first complained of having difficulty seeing plays on the field. On his doctor's recommendation, he took a brief leave of absence, but within weeks, Jerpe had become completely blind. Notwithstanding this sudden and disheartening development, Jerpe continued to provide his column, "On and Off the Field" (and later "Sport-itorials"), as well as other featured articles until deteriorating health forced him to bow out altogether in September 1916.

== Personal life ==
In March 1908, Jerpe married Eva J. Thompson, with whom he had two children. In October 1960, their grandson, Andrew F. Jerpe, gained some measure of notoriety as the 14-year-old who, while making a slightly premature exit from Forbes Field just prior to the conclusion of Game 7 of the 1960 World Series, retrieved Bill Mazeroski's Series-ending home run ball.

== Death ==
At 9 A.M. on Tuesday morning, January 16, 1917, not quite 5 months after his retirement, Jerpes finally died from his nearly 2-year-long illness. His funeral, held on January 19, attracted many friends and colleagues, including representatives of the Gazette-Times, the Police and Fire Departments, and the Pittsburgh Stove League. In accordance with Jerpe's last wishes, his favorite musical selection, John McCormack's 1916 recording of "Beautiful Isle of Somewhere," was played during the funeral service.
