= Jack Horrigan (sportswriter) =

American journalist

John P. "Jack" Horrigan (December 30, 1925 – June 2, 1973) was a sportswriter for the Buffalo Evening News and American Football League (AFL) public relations director who went on to serve in public relations for the Buffalo Bills.

== Jack Horrigan Award ==
Since 1974, the Pro Football Writers Association have given an annual award in Horrigan's name, to honor a league or club official "for his or her qualities and professional style in helping the pro football writers do their job." Past winners have included Tom Landry and Dan Rooney.

== See also ==
- American Football League players, coaches and contributors
