= List of American literary critics =

- John Neal: Early American literary nationalist and regionalist
- Edgar Allan Poe: Dark Romanticism, Short-Story Theory
- T. S. Eliot: Modernism
- Harold Bloom: Aestheticism
- Susan Sontag: Against Interpretation, On Photography
- John Updike: Literary realism/modernism and aestheticist critic
- M. H. Abrams: The Mirror and the Lamp (study of Romanticism)
- F. O. Matthiessen: originated the concept "American Renaissance"
- Perry Miller: Puritan studies
- Henry Nash Smith: founder of the "Myth and Symbol School" of American criticism
- Leo Marx: The Machine in the Garden (study of technology and culture)
- Leslie Fiedler: Love and Death in the American Novel
- Stanley Fish: Pragmatism
- Henry Louis Gates: African-American literary theory
- Gerald Vizenor: Native American literary theory
- William Dean Howells: Literary realism
- Stephen Greenblatt: New Historicism
- Geoffrey Hartman: Yale school of deconstruction
- John Crowe Ransom: New Criticism
- Cleanth Brooks: New Criticism
- Kenneth Burke: Rhetoric studies
- Elaine Showalter: Feminist criticism
- Sandra M. Gilbert: Feminist criticism
- Susan Gubar: Feminist criticism
- Alicia Ostriker: feminist criticism
- J. Hillis Miller: Deconstruction
- Edward Said: Postcolonial criticism
- Jonathan Culler: Critical theory, deconstruction
- Judith Butler: Post-structuralist feminism
- Gloria E. Anzaldúa: Latina literary theory
- Ilan Stavans: Latino cultural theory
- Frederick Luis Aldama: Latino literature in the United States
- Eve Kosofsky Sedgwick: Queer theory
- Fredric Jameson: Marxist criticism
