= Charean Williams =

American sportswriter (born 1965)

Charean Williams is an American sportswriter for NBC Sports.

== Career ==
Williams graduated from Texas A&M University in 1986. From 1999 to 2017, she covered the Dallas Cowboys for the Fort Worth Star-Telegram.

Williams is the first woman to have a vote for the Pro Football Hall of Fame and the first woman to serve as president of the Pro Football Writers Association. In 2018, she was selected as the recipient of the Dick McCann Memorial Award. She served as a member of the "Centennial Slate Blue-Ribbon Panel" that selected 15 enshrinees for the Pro Football Hall of Fame's 2020 Centennial Class.
