= Cooper Rollow =

American sportswriter (1925–2013)

Cooper Rollow (1925 in Wichita, Kansas – March 29, 2013 in Elmhurst, Illinois) was an American sportswriter for 35 years as a writer and sports editor (1965–1977) for the Chicago Tribune, mostly on pro football. He was awarded the Dick McCann Memorial Award from the Pro Football Hall of Fame in 1985.

Rollow was a four-time winner of the Illinois Associated Press (AP) sports contest. Rollow won the AP competition in 1960 for a three-part series on the late Vince Lombardi, in 1964 for his coverage of the deaths of Willie Galimore and John Farrington of the Chicago Bears in a training camp auto accident, in 1973 for his portrayal of the dramatic and tragic events in the Munich Olympic Games and 1974 for his coverage of the Ali-Frazier fight in Madison Square Garden.

In 1969, Rollow won the United Press International award for his coverage of the Green Bay Packers' climactic victory over the Chicago Bears.

He served as President of the Pro Football Writers of America (PFWA) (1983–84). He also served as the former President of the Chicago Professional Football Writers Association, a director of the National College Football Writers Association and an elector in the Pro Football Hall of Fame.

A Kansas native and 1949 graduate of the University of Kansas, Rollow held newspaper positions in Fort Scott, Kansas and Lincoln, Nebraska before he was hired by the late Arch Ward, the previous sports editor of The Chicago Tribune.

Rollow also saw combat duty in Gen. Patton's Third Army in World War II.

Rollow was described by author Jeff Davis as "the leading journalist of his time concerning the relationship of [former Chicago Bears head coach and owner George] Halas and [Green Bay Packers head coach] Vince Lombardi."

Rollow was also a posthumous winner of the 2020/2021 Ring Lardner Award for Excellence in Sports Journalism.
