= Never Miss a Super Bowl Club =

Group of American football fans

The Never Miss a Super Bowl Club is a group of football fans (outside of owners and staff) who have gone to every Super Bowl since 1967. Visa popularized the original group of four in a commercial that aired in 2010. Since then, two members have died and one has been retroactively added, bringing the total to three surviving fans—Don Crisman, Tom Henschel, and Gregory Eaton—who most recently attended Super Bowl LX on February 8, 2026. Photojournalist John Biever is the only known person outside of the group of fans to have attended every Super Bowl.

== History ==
The club was first popularized by Visa as part of an advertising campaign called Go Fans. The commercial was narrated by Morgan Freeman. Surveys have shown that most respondents would be willing to miss or postpone major events in their life, including the birth of their child or a wedding date, to see the Super Bowl. As a result, Visa came up with an advertising campaign to feature four men who have attended every Super Bowl since the first one in 1967. The four men were New England Patriots fan Don Crisman, San Francisco 49ers fan Larry Jacobson, Pittsburgh Steelers fan Thomas Henschel, and Green Bay Packers fan Robert Cook. The commercial itself featured the four men holding up tickets for 44 years of Super Bowls.

In early February 2011, it was announced that 79-year-old Cook would be unable to attend Super Bowl XLV after being hospitalized in Wisconsin. His daughters were expected to attend the game in his place. He died four days after the game, which was won by his favorite team, the Green Bay Packers, 31-25.

At Super Bowl LI, in February 2017, another person who had gone to every Super Bowl game, Gregory Eaton, met the three remaining members and officially joined the club. Eaton is a fan of the Detroit Lions, a team that has never played in the Super Bowl.

In October 2017, Jacobson died, reducing the club to three members.

In 2026, Crisman said that Super Bowl LX would be the last he would attend due to declining health.

== Lifetime tickets promotion ==
A promotion was also run during the 2010 commercial. The Super Bowl Trip for Life Sweepstakes stated that anyone who used their Visa card between September 9 and December 31, 2010, would be entered to win a chance to see the Super Bowl for life. Winners would receive round-trip airfare, accommodations, and tickets to the Super Bowl. In 2011, it was announced that Tyler Weber, then 24 years old, won the contest.

== Other attendees ==
As of Super Bowl LX, photojournalist John Biever has attended every Super Bowl.

=== Former ===
Groundskeeper George Toma assisted in preparing the field for the first 57 Super Bowls. Super Bowl LVIII was the first game Toma did not attend or serve as a groundskeeper.

Norma Hunt, the wife of Kansas City Chiefs founding owner Lamar Hunt, was the only woman to attend every Super Bowl game from 1967 to 2023 (Super Bowl I to Super Bowl LVII) until her death in June 2023. The final Super Bowl she attended, Super Bowl LVII, was won by the Chiefs. She was also on the podium for the Lombardi Trophy presentation for the Chiefs Super Bowl LIV victory. Her husband Lamar Hunt helped establish the championship game and coined the term "super bowl".

Sports journalist Jerry Green attended every Super Bowl until choosing to not go to Super Bowl LVII due to declining health. Green died the month following the game, on March 24, 2023.
