= Bob McGinn =

American sportswriter

Bob McGinn is an American sportswriter, best known for his 38-year tenure covering the Green Bay Packers. McGinn, who retired in 2017, worked for the Green Bay Press-Gazette and the Milwaukee Journal-Sentinel since the early 1990s.
