= D. Orlando Ledbetter =

American sportswriter

Darryl Orlando Ledbetter (born 1968) is an American sportswriter.

== Career ==
Ledbetter began his journalism career with Howard University's student newspaper, The Hilltop. He followed that with a stint at The Charlotte Observer from 1984 to 1986, writing about high school sports. After college he joined The Cincinnati Enquirer. While there he covered the Cincinnati Bengals, Ohio State football and basketball, and high school sports.

From 1992 to 2000 he worked at the Milwaukee Journal Sentinel covering Milwaukee Bucks and Marquette University basketball while also serving as a columnist. He joined the Atlanta Journal-Constitution in 2003 and has covered the Atlanta Falcons since the 2005 season.

== Other Work ==
Ledbetter is a member of the Pro Football Hall of Fame Selection Committee, including the Hall's Seniors Committee. He served as the 26th president of the Pro Football Writers of America during the 2013–14 seasons.

== Awards and honors ==
In 2024, Ledbetter was honored with the Bill Nunn Memorial Award from the Pro Football Hall of Fame.
