= Jerry Green (writer) =

American sports journalist and author (1928–2023)

- Born: Jerome Frederic Green; April 15, 1928; New York City, U.S.
- Died: March 23, 2023 (aged 94); Bloomfield Hills, Michigan, U.S.
- Education: The Hotchkiss School; Brown University; Boston University
- Occupation: Sportswriter
- Years active: 1952–2023
- Spouse: Nancy (m. 1961-2002)
- Children: 1

Jerome Frederic Green (April 15, 1928 – March 23, 2023) was an American sports journalist and author. He was a staff writer for the Associated Press from 1956 to 1963 and for The Detroit News from 1963 to 2004. He was inducted into the Pro Football Hall of Fame in 2005 and the Michigan Sports Hall of Fame in 2003. He is the only sportswriter to have covered each of the first 56 Super Bowls, from 1967 to 2022.

== Reporter ==
Green began his reporting career in New York in 1952, at the New York Journal-American, before enlisting in the United States Navy the following year. Upon his return, he was a sports writer for the Associated Press from 1956 to 1963, when he was hired by The Detroit News. He was a staff sports writer for The Detroit News for 41 years from 1963 until his retirement in 2004. He covered baseball, football, basketball, hockey, and other sports for the paper. Having also covered the 1957 Detroit Lions as a young reporter with the Associated Press, Green lays claim to being "the last surviving Detroit sportswriter who covered the Tigers, Red Wings, Pistons and Lions championships".

Even after his retirement from regular reporting, Green remained with the paper as a columnist. He was noted for his coverage of the Super Bowl, as the only sportswriter to cover every Super Bowl from Super Bowl I in 1967 through Super Bowl LVI in 2022.

Green did not attend Super Bowl LVII in 2023, due to poor health caused by idiopathic pulmonary fibrosis, among other ailments. However, he continued to write until shortly before his death the following month.

== Author ==
Green published several books, including histories of the Super Bowl, the Detroit Lions, the Detroit Pistons, and Michigan Wolverines football, as well as single-season books on the 1968 Detroit Tigers World Series championship team and the 1998 Denver Broncos Super Bowl championship team. Green's books include:

- "Year of the Tiger: The Diary of Detroit's World Champions," Jerry Green (Coward-McCann, 1969). ISBN 9781469178165
- "Detroit Lions," Jerry Green (Macmillan, 1973)
- "The Detroit Pistons: Capturing a Remarkable Era," Jerry Green (Bonus Books, 1991)
- "Super Bowl Chronicles: A Sportswriter Reflects on the First 30 Years of America's Game," Jerry Green (Masters Press, 1995)
- "Greatest Moments in Detroit Red Wings history," Joe Falls, Jerry Green, Vartan Kupelian (Masters Press, 1997)
- "Mile High Miracle: Elway and the Broncos, Super Bowl Champions at Last," Jerry Green (Masters Press, 1999)
- "They Earned Their Stripes: The Detroit Tigers' All-Time Team," Detroit News (Sports Publishing LLC, 2001)
- "University of Michigan Football Vault: The History of the Wolverines," Jerry Green (Whitman Pub Llc, 2008)

== Personal life ==
Green was born in Manhattan. He was educated at the Hotchkiss School, Brown University, and Boston University. He was married to his wife, Nancy from 1966 until her death in 2002; they had a daughter.

After living in Grosse Pointe, Michigan, for years, Green moved to an assisted living facility in Bloomfield Hills, Michigan, at the end of his life. He died on March 23, 2023, at the age of 94.

== Awards ==
During his career with The Detroit News, Green was voted Michigan's Sportswriter of the Year 10 times by the National Sportscasters and Sportswriters Association. He was inducted into the "writer's wing" of the Pro Football Hall of Fame in 2005 as the recipient of the Dick McCann Memorial Award. He was also inducted into the Michigan Sports Hall of Fame in 2003, and the Michigan Jewish Sports Hall of Fame in 2004. Green was awarded a Lifetime Member Award by the Detroit Sports Media.

== Selected articles by Green ==
- He's Stealing the Scene (Maury Wills), Baseball Digest, September 1965
- Clemente's Plaint (Roberto Clemente), Baseball Digest, August 1967
- He Laughs All the Way to the Park and Back (Bob Gibson), Baseball Digest, October 1968
- Branch Rickey's Last Protege: Clyde King (Clyde King), Baseball Digest, June 1969
- Red Rolfe -- A True Yankee (Red Rolfe), Baseball Digest, February 1970
- 30 Years Ago - Baseball's Most Dramatic All-Star Game (1941 All-Star Game), Baseball Digest, July 1971
- Tigers Collect Dividends on Trade for Cash (Norm Cash), Baseball Digest, September 1971
- Memories of the Beloved St. Louis Browns Still Linger (1944 St. Louis Browns), Baseball Digest, December 1975
- Will Mark Fidrych Defy the 'Sophomore Jinx' (Mark Fidrych), Baseball Digest, April 1977
- A Prized Rookie Combo: Trammell and Whitaker (Alan Trammell/Lou Whitaker), Baseball Digest, November 1978
- Mickey Stanley: He Was the Complete Pro (Mickey Stanley), Baseball Digest, March 1979
- Membership in 3,000-Hit Club Bloomed in 1970s (3,000 hit club), Baseball Digest, December 1979
- Jason Thompson: The Struggle to Regain Acclaim (Jason Thompson), Baseball Digest, June 1980
- Mays and Wertz Recall Famous Series Catch (The Catch), Baseball Digest, October 1980
- McEnroe Set The Trend For Snubbing Wimbledon (John McEnroe), Associated Press, June 27, 1982
- An empty, dusty ballfield vital part of Rose's roots (Pete Rose), The Detroit News, September 1985
- Trade for Smoltz Helped Turn Braves into Winner (John Smoltz), Baseball Digest, February 1992
- Charlie Gehringer: A First-Class Second Baseman (Charlie Gehringer), Baseball Digest, November 1992
- Yzerman's finest hour (Steve Yzerman), The Detroit News, 2002
- NFL coach Vince Lombardi, owner Art Rooney two of the greats in their fields (Vince Lombardi/Art Rooney), The Detroit News, February 5, 2011
- Sparky made Tigers champions; today, they say thank you (Sparky Anderson), The Detroit News, June 26, 2011

== See also ==
- Never Miss a Super Bowl Club
