= John Steadman (sportswriter) =

American sportswriter (1927–2001)

- Born: February 14, 1927; Baltimore, Maryland, U.S.
- Died: January 1, 2001 (aged 73); Baltimore, Maryland, U.S.
- Occupation: Sportswriter
- Spouse: Mary Lee

John F. Steadman Jr. (February 14, 1927 – January 1, 2001) was an American sportswriter for The Baltimore Sun. His career spanned seven decades and he attended and reported on every Super Bowl from its inception until his death.

== Background ==
Steadman was a student at Blessed Sacrament School on Old York Road and East 41st Street. Following his graduation after the eighth grade, he attended Baltimore City College high school where he played catcher on the varsity team. He played two years in minor league baseball, playing for the Pittsburgh Pirates organization. He decided to leave baseball in order to become a sportswriter.

== Career ==
He was originally hired by the Baltimore News-Post in 1945 as a sports reporter, earning 14 dollars a week. In 1952, Steadman revealed that Baltimore would regain an NFL franchise. Steadman would attend every Baltimore Football game from 1947 to December 10, 2000, a streak of 719 games. He was also one of only eight writers to attend all 34 Super Bowls, through Super Bowl XXXIV. He was inducted into the National Sportscasters and Sportswriters Association Hall of Fame in 2000.

Steadman served as a color commentator on Colts radio broadcasts from 1955 to 1958 and again from 1963 to 1966.

In 1959, he wrote the book "The Greatest Football Game Ever Played: When the Baltimore Colts and New York Giants Faced Sudden Death".

Steadman was honored by the Associated Press Sports Editors as the posthumous recipient of the Red Smith Award, America's most prestigious sports writing honor, on June 29, 2001.

== Personal life ==
In 1973, the John F. Steadman firehouse, at the base of Baltimore's Bromo-Seltzer Tower was named for sportswriter John Steadman's father, John F. Steadman Sr., a Baltimore City Fire Department Deputy Chief.

Steadman died in hospice care in Baltimore on New Year's Day 2001, six weeks before his 74th birthday. He was survived by his wife, Mary.
