= Curt Gowdy Media Award =

Annual award for outstanding basketball writers

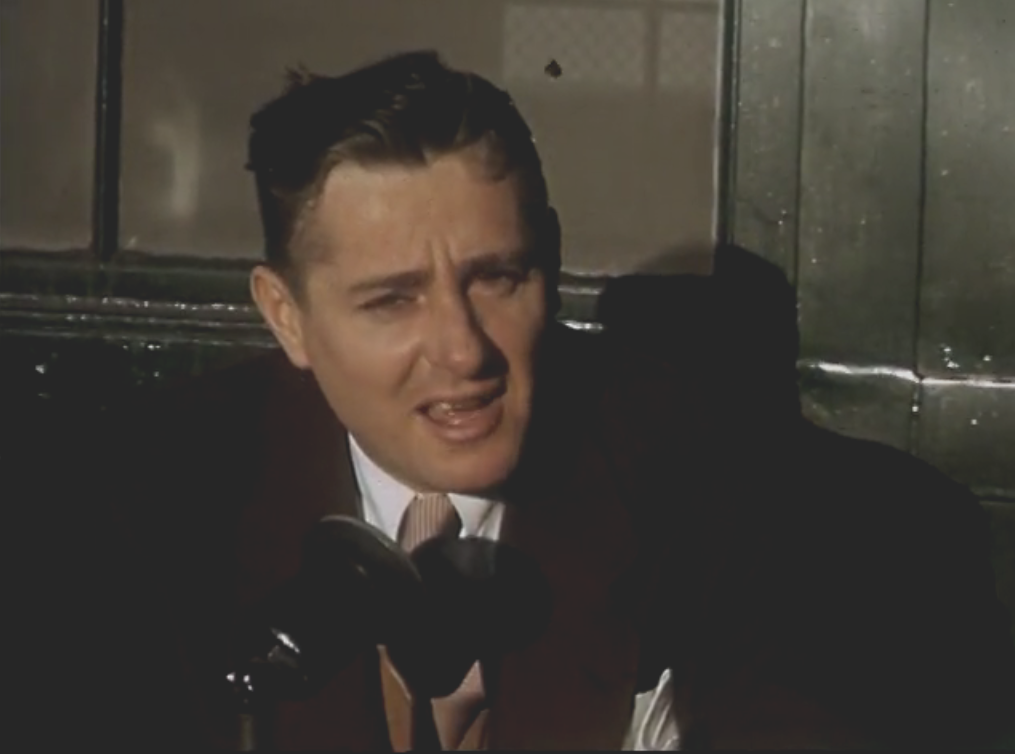
- Curt Gowdy, the award's namesake, in the 1950s
- Sport: Basketball
- Awarded for: "To single out members of the electronic and print media for outstanding contributions to basketball."
- Location: Naismith Memorial Basketball Hall of Fame; Springfield, Massachusetts

History
- First award: 1990
- Most recent: Debbie Antonelli, J.A. Adende (2024)
- Website: Official website

The Curt Gowdy Media Award is an annual award given by the Naismith Memorial Basketball Hall of Fame to outstanding basketball writers and broadcasters. It is named for American sportscaster Curt Gowdy, who was the Hall of Fame's president for seven years.

== Recipients ==
This list of awardees is taken from the website of the Naismith Memorial Basketball Hall of Fame.

=== Broadcasters ===
- 1990 – Curt Gowdy
- 1991 – Marty Glickman
- 1992 – Chick Hearn
- 1993 – Johnny Most
- 1994 – Cawood Ledford
- 1995 – Dick Enberg
- 1996 – Billy Packer
- 1997 – Marv Albert
- 1998 – Dick Vitale
- 1999 – Bob Costas
- 2000 – Hubie Brown
- 2001 – Dick Stockton
- 2002 – Jim Nantz
- 2003 – Rod Hundley
- 2004 – Max Falkenstien
- 2005 – Bill Campbell
- 2006 – Bill Raftery
- 2007 – Al McCoy
- 2008 – Bob Wolff
- 2009 – Doug Collins
- 2010 – Joe Tait
- 2011 – Jim Durham
- 2012 – Bill Schonely
- 2013 – Eddie Doucette
- 2014 – John Andariese
- 2015 – Woody Durham
- 2016 – Jay Bilas
- 2017 – Craig Sager
- 2018 – Doris Burke
- 2019 – Ralph Lawler
- 2020 – Mike Breen
- 2021 – Mike Gorman
- 2022 – Walt Frazier
- 2023 – Holly Rowe
- 2024 – Debbie Antonelli
- 2025 – George Blaha and Clark Kellogg
- 2026 – Chris Carrino and Mike Fratello

=== Sportswriters ===
- 1990 – Dick Herbert (The News & Observer)
- 1991 – Dave Dorr (St. Louis Post-Dispatch)
- 1992 – Sam Goldaper (The New York Times)
- 1993 – Leonard Lewin (New York Post)
- 1994 – Leonard Koppett (The New York Times and New York Post)
- 1995 – Bob Hammel (The Herald-Times)
- 1996 – Bob Hentzen (The Topeka Capital-Journal)
- 1997 – Bob Ryan (The Boston Globe)
- 1998 – Larry Donald (Basketball Times) and Dick Weiss (Daily News)
- 1999 – Smith Barrier (News & Record)
- 2000 – Dave Kindred (The Sporting News)
- 2001 – Curry Kirkpatrick (ESPN The Magazine and Sports Illustrated)
- 2002 – Jim O'Connell (Associated Press)
- 2003 – Sid Hartman (Star Tribune)
- 2004 – Phil Jasner (Philadelphia Daily News)
- 2005 – Jack McCallum (Sports Illustrated)
- 2006 – Mark Heisler (Los Angeles Times)
- 2007 – Malcolm Moran (USA Today and The New York Times)
- 2008 – David DuPree (USA Today)
- 2009 – Peter Vecsey (New York Post)
- 2010 – Jackie MacMullan (The Boston Globe)
- 2011 – Alexander Wolff (Sports Illustrated)
- 2012 – Sam Smith (Chicago Tribune)
- 2013 – John Feinstein (The Washington Post and Sporting News)
- 2014 – Joe Gilmartin (Phoenix Gazette and Sporting News)
- 2015 – Rich Clarkson (The Topeka Capital-Journal and National Geographic)
- 2016 – David Aldridge (The Philadelphia Inquirer and NBA.com)
- 2017 – Harvey Araton (The New York Times)
- 2018 – Andy Bernstein (NBA)
- 2019 – Marc Stein (ESPN and The New York Times)
- 2020 – Michael Wilbon (The Washington Post)
- 2021 – Mel Greenberg (The Philadelphia Inquirer)
- 2022 – Michael Voepel (ESPN)
- 2023 – Marc Spears (ESPN and Andscape)
- 2024 – J. A. Adande (Los Angeles Times and ESPN)
- 2025 – Michelle Smith (San Francisco Chronicle and ESPN)

=== Transformative ===
- 2020 – Inside the NBA
- 2022 – Dick Ebersol
- 2023 – CBS Sports
- 2024 – NBA Inside Stuff and Slam

=== Insight ===
- 2020 – Jim Gray
- 2021 – George Kalinsky
- 2025 – Adrian Wojnarowski

== See also ==
- List of sports journalism awards
- Ford C. Frick Award - MLB's comparable award
- Foster Hewitt Memorial Award - the NHL's comparable award
- Pete Rozelle Radio-Television Award - the NFL's comparable award
