= National Sports Media Association =

American organization of sports media members

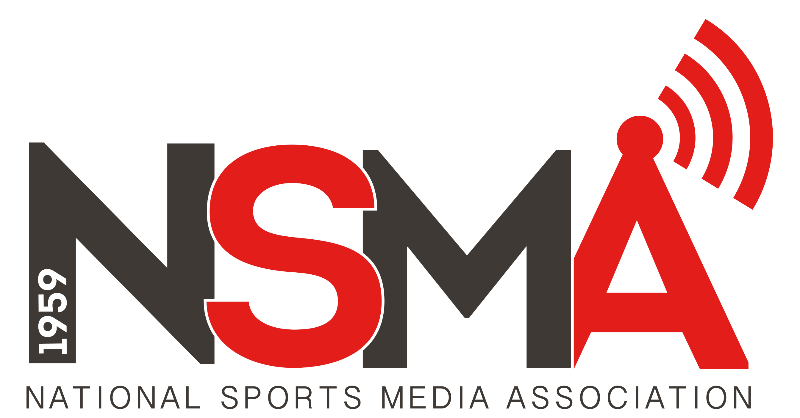
NSMA logo

The National Sports Media Association (NSMA), formerly the National Sportscasters and Sportswriters Association, is an American organization of sports media members in the United States, and constitutes the American chapter of the International Sports Press Association (AIPS).

Winston-Salem, North Carolina now serves as the headquarters for the NSMA, which is responsible for the organizing and counting of all the ballots for the National, State (49 states plus D.C.), and Hall of Fame winners. The organization had been based in Salisbury, North Carolina until 2017. There are now more than 100 inductees in the Hall of Fame. The organization plans and funds the Annual Awards Program.

Former television sportscaster Dave Goren serves as the NSMA's executive director.

== History ==
The National Sportscasters and Sportswriters Association (NSSA) was formed in 1959 by a local restaurant owner, Pete DiMizio, to honor regional sportscasters and sportswriters whom he had met at the Greensboro Open Golf Tournament in Greensboro, North Carolina. When DiMizio died, Ed McKenzie took over the leadership role and guided it through the expansion to a national association. Its first Annual Awards Program was held in Salisbury, North Carolina, on April 12, 1960. Lindsey Nelson was selected the 1959 National Sportscaster of the Year and Red Smith was voted the 1959 Sportswriter of the Year.

In 1962 Grantland Rice was selected as the first Hall of Fame inductee. As Red Smith inducted Rice into the Hall of Fame, he said, "Who knows what will become of this Hall of Fame? It might never be heard from again. No matter, it cannot be improved, for it is perfect tonight with only Granny enshrined."

In April 1990, the NSSA celebrated its 31st Annual Awards Program, with Chris Berman of ESPN being selected as Sportscaster of the Year and Peter Gammons receiving the honor as Sportswriter of the Year. The Hall of Fame inductees were Dave Anderson, Pulitzer Prize winner from The New York Times, and Jack Buck, the long-time radio voice of the St. Louis Cardinals and a radio and television sportscaster for CBS.

Though located in Salisbury, "the NSSA office itself has bounced around town like a ping-pong ball." The Hall of Fame opened officially on May 1, 2000 in the two-story, 10,000-square-foot former North Carolina Federal Savings and Loan building at 322 East Innes Street in Salisbury. When Claude Hampton became NSSA director, he was told the Hall of Fame was nothing more than a desk drawer with folders in the Chamber of Commerce building. He wanted an actual building and considered Catawba College as a location, but when he saw the branch of the failed bank in 1990, he made an offer which was accepted. The goal was to open the museum by 1992. A 23-foot sculpture of two eagles was moved from the bank to Charlotte Motor Speedway, but people wanted the eagles back, so they were returned and local people donated their services to put the eagles back and get the building ready. An opening reception and dedication took place in 1991. But due to lack of funding, it took ten years for the building to actually open. Until then, hundreds of thousands of dollars' worth of memorabilia were stored in boxes. With the Hall of Fame open, visitors could hear Babe Ruth's called shot, Hank Aaron's 715th home run, the Ice Bowl, the 1992 Duke-Kentucky game, and young Tiger Woods on The Mike Douglas Show.

On November 1, 2005, Community Bank of Rowan (later part of Yadkin Financial) purchased the Innes Street location, opening its headquarters there in 2006. This required the NSSA to move to a temporary location on North Main Street in Salisbury, but visitors would not be allowed. Veteran sports journalist Dave Goren, best known as sports director at WXII-TV in Winston-Salem, North Carolina, became NSSA executive director September 1, 2009. On December 1 of that year, the NSSA held a reception at its new office in 1,900 square feet at 325 Lee Street in Salisbury. The warehouse only included a few items such as shoes autographed by Ralph Sampson and a football signed by Berman; the rest remained in storage. The NSSA has since moved to Summit Avenue in Salisbury, on the campus of Catawba College.

At the 54th annual program in June 2013, Dan Patrick of ESPN Radio received the award as National Sportscaster of the Year with Peter King of Sports Illustrated honored as National Sportswriter of the Year. The Hall of Fame inductees were Mitch Albom and Dick Vitale.

In June 2014, hockey broadcaster Mike "Doc" Emrick was voted National Sportscaster of the Year, with King repeating as National Sportswriter of the Year. Inducted into the Hall of Fame were sportscaster Marv Albert and sportswriter Rick Reilly.

Emrick and writer Tom Verducci were the national award winners honored on June 8, 2015. Four new NSSA Hall of Fame members were inducted: baseball writer Hal McCoy, basketball commentator Bill Raftery, sportswriter and sportscaster Lesley Visser and, posthumously, author, journalist and television personality Dick Schaap.

In April 2017, after 57 years in Salisbury, the National Sports Media Association moved to Winston-Salem, North Carolina.

== Organization ==
Our Mission

The National Sports Media Association, Inc. is a 501(c)(3) nonprofit organization, which seeks to develop educational opportunities for those who are interested in pursuing a career in sports media, through networking, interning, mentoring, and scholarship programs.

The NSMA also honors, preserves, and celebrates the diverse legacy of sports media in the United States.

== Paul "Bear" Bryant Award ==
The Paul "Bear" Bryant Award is an award that has been given annually since 1986 to NCAA college football's national coach of the year. The Award was named in honor of longtime Alabama coach Bear Bryant after he died of a heart attack in 1983. It is voted on by the NSMA, and proceeds from the awards ceremony benefit the American Heart Association. The College Football Coach of the Year Award began in 1957 and was renamed for Bryant in 1986. Bryant himself won the AFCA Coach of the Year award in 1961, 1971, and 1973. According to the official website:

The Paul "Bear" Bryant College Football Coaching Award ceremony is an exclusive event that honors a college football coach whose great accomplishments, both on and off the field, are legendary. The award recognizes the masters of coaching and allows them to take their deserved place in history beside other legends like Bear Bryant.

== Clarence "Big House" Gaines Awards ==
The NSMA established the Clarence "Big House" Gaines College Basketball Coach of the Year Awards in 2010, with the first presentation occurring in 2011. The awards are presented to two head coaches – one in NCAA Division I and one in Division II – at the annual NSMA awards banquet. The purpose of the award is to recognize coaches who might not receive recognition from "mainstream outlets." An NSMA committee votes after the end of the men's and women's championship tournaments. The award is named for Clarence Gaines, the former head coach of Winston-Salem State University.

== National Sportscaster of the Year ==
- For list of winners, see footnote
- 1959 – Lindsey Nelson (NBC)
- 1960 – Lindsey Nelson (NBC)
- 1961 – Lindsey Nelson (NBC)
- 1962 – Lindsey Nelson (NBC)
- 1963 – Chris Schenkel (CBS)
- 1964 – Chris Schenkel (CBS)
- 1965 – Vin Scully (L. A. Dodgers)
- 1966 – Curt Gowdy (NBC)
- 1967 – Chris Schenkel (ABC)
- 1968 – Ray Scott (CBS)
- 1969 – Curt Gowdy (NBC)
- 1970 – Chris Schenkel (ABC)
- 1971 – Ray Scott (CBS)
- 1972 – Keith Jackson (ABC)
- 1973 – Keith Jackson (ABC)
- 1974 – Keith Jackson (ABC)
- 1975 – Keith Jackson (ABC)
- 1976 – Keith Jackson (ABC)
- 1977 – Pat Summerall (CBS)
- 1978 – Vin Scully (L.A. Dodgers, CBS)
- 1979 – Dick Enberg (NBC)
- 1980 – Dick Enberg (NBC) and Al Michaels (ABC)
- 1981 – Dick Enberg (NBC)
- 1982 – Vin Scully (L.A. Dodgers, CBS)
- 1983 – Al Michaels (ABC)
- 1984 – John Madden (CBS)
- 1985 – Bob Costas (NBC)
- 1986 – Al Michaels (ABC)
- 1987 – Bob Costas (NBC)
- 1988 – Bob Costas (NBC)
- 1989 – Chris Berman (ESPN)
- 1990 – Chris Berman (ESPN)
- 1991 – Bob Costas (NBC)
- 1992 – Bob Costas (NBC)
- 1993 – Chris Berman (ESPN)
- 1994 – Chris Berman (ESPN)
- 1995 – Bob Costas (NBC)
- 1996 – Chris Berman (ESPN)
- 1997 – Bob Costas (NBC)
- 1998 – Jim Nantz (CBS)
- 1999 – Dan Patrick (ESPN)
- 2000 – Bob Costas (NBC, HBO)
- 2001 – Chris Berman (ESPN)
- 2002 – Joe Buck (Fox)
- 2003 – Joe Buck (Fox)
- 2004 – Joe Buck (Fox)
- 2005 – Jim Nantz (CBS)
- 2006 – Joe Buck (Fox)
- 2007 – Jim Nantz (CBS)
- 2008 – Jim Nantz (CBS)
- 2009 – Jim Nantz (CBS)
- 2010 – Mike Tirico (ABC, ESPN)
- 2011 – Dan Shulman (ESPN)
- 2012 – Dan Patrick (NBC)
- 2013 – Mike Emrick (NBC)
- 2014 – Mike Emrick (NBC)
- 2015 – Mike Emrick (NBC)
- 2016 – Vin Scully (L.A. Dodgers)
- 2017 – Kevin Harlan (CBS, Turner)
- 2018 – Doris Burke (ESPN, ABC)
- 2019 – Kevin Harlan (CBS, Turner)
- 2020 – Mike Emrick (NBC)
- 2021 – Ernie Johnson Jr. (Turner) and Scott Van Pelt (ESPN)
- 2022 – Ian Eagle (CBS)
- 2023 – Kevin Harlan (CBS/Westwood One/Turner)
- 2024 − Ian Eagle (CBS)
- 2025 - Sean McDonough (ESPN)

== National Sportswriter of the Year ==
For a list of winners, see footnote Jim Murray, writing for the Los Angeles Times, won the National Sportswriter of the Year award a record 14 times, including 12 years in succession from 1966 to 1977. More recently, Rick Reilly, writing for Sports Illustrated and ESPN, has won 11 awards.

- 1959 – Red Smith (New York Herald-Tribune)
- 1960 – Red Smith (New York Herald-Tribune)
- 1961 – Red Smith (New York Herald-Tribune)
- 1962 – Red Smith (New York Herald-Tribune)
- 1963 – Arthur Daley (New York Times)
- 1964 – Jim Murray (Los Angeles Times)
- 1965 – Red Smith (New York Herald-Tribune)
- 1966 – Jim Murray (Los Angeles Times)
- 1967 – Jim Murray (Los Angeles Times)
- 1968 – Jim Murray (Los Angeles Times)
- 1969 – Jim Murray (Los Angeles Times)
- 1970 – Jim Murray (Los Angeles Times)
- 1971 – Jim Murray (Los Angeles Times)
- 1972 – Jim Murray (Los Angeles Times)
- 1973 – Jim Murray (Los Angeles Times)
- 1974 – Jim Murray (Los Angeles Times)
- 1975 – Jim Murray (Los Angeles Times)
- 1976 – Jim Murray (Los Angeles Times)
- 1977 – Jim Murray (Los Angeles Times)
- 1978 – Will Grimsley (Associated Press)
- 1979 – Jim Murray (Los Angeles Times)
- 1980 – Will Grimsley (Associated Press)
- 1981 – Will Grimsley (Associated Press)
- 1982 – Frank Deford (Sports Illustrated)
- 1983 – Frank Deford (Sports Illustrated)
- 1984 – Frank Deford (Sports Illustrated)
- 1985 – Frank Deford (Sports Illustrated)
- 1986 – Frank Deford (Sports Illustrated)
- 1987 – Frank Deford (Sports Illustrated)
- 1988 – Frank Deford (Sports Illustrated)
- 1989 – Peter Gammons (Sports Illustrated)
- 1990 – Peter Gammons (Boston Globe)
- 1991 – Rick Reilly (Sports Illustrated)
- 1992 – Rick Reilly (Sports Illustrated)
- 1993 – Peter Gammons (Boston Globe, ESPN)
- 1994 – Rick Reilly (Sports Illustrated)
- 1995 – Rick Reilly (Sports Illustrated)
- 1996 – Rick Reilly (Sports Illustrated)
- 1997 – Dave Kindred (Sporting News)
- 1998 – Mitch Albom (Detroit Free Press)
- 1999 – Rick Reilly (Sports Illustrated)
- 2000 – Bob Ryan (Boston Globe)
- 2001 – Rick Reilly (Sports Illustrated)
- 2002 – Rick Reilly (Sports Illustrated)
- 2003 – Rick Reilly (Sports Illustrated)
- 2004 – Rick Reilly (Sports Illustrated)
- 2005 – Steve Rushin (Sports Illustrated)
- 2006 – Rick Reilly (Sports Illustrated)
- 2007 – Bob Ryan (Boston Globe)
- 2008 – Bob Ryan (Boston Globe)
- 2009 – Bob Ryan (Boston Globe)
- 2010 – Peter King (Sports Illustrated)
- 2011 – Peter King (Sports Illustrated)
- 2012 – Joe Posnanski (Sports Illustrated)
- 2013 – Peter King (Sports Illustrated)
- 2014 – Tom Verducci (Sports Illustrated)
- 2015 – Tom Verducci (Sports Illustrated)
- 2016 – Tom Verducci (Sports Illustrated)
- 2017 – Adrian Wojnarowski (ESPN)
- 2018 – Adrian Wojnarowski (ESPN)
- 2019 – Adrian Wojnarowski (ESPN)
- 2020 – Nicole Auerbach (The Athletic)
- 2021 – Jeff Passan (ESPN)
- 2022 – Ken Rosenthal (The Athletic)/Pete Thamel (ESPN) - Co-winners
- 2023 – Jeff Passan (ESPN)
- 2024 – Ken Rosenthal (The Athletic)

== State winners ==
See footnote

- Sportscaster of the Year (1959–present; in each state and the District of Columbia)
- Sportswriter of the Year (1959–present; in each state and the District of Columbia)

== Hall of Fame ==
Each spring, the NSMA Hall of Fame inducts one or more new members. There were not any inductees in 1965, 1966, 1968, and 2006.

- 1962 – Grantland Rice
- 1963 – Ted Husing
- 1964 – Damon Runyon
- 1964 – Graham McNamee
- 1965 – (no induction)
- 1966 – (no induction)
- 1967 – Ring Lardner
- 1968 – (no induction)
- 1969 – J. G. Taylor Spink
- 1970 – Clem McCarthy
- 1971 – John Kieran
- 1972 – Mel Allen
- 1973 – Arch Ward
- 1973 – Red Barber
- 1974 – Bill Stern
- 1974 – Stanley Woodward
- 1975 – Dan Parker
- 1975 – Russ Hodges
- 1976 – Arthur Daley
- 1976 – Dizzy Dean
- 1977 – Red Smith
- 1978 – Jesse Owens
- 1978 – Jim Murray
- 1979 – John Wayne
- 1979 – Lindsey Nelson
- 1980 – Bob Considine
- 1980 – Lou Gehrig
- 1981 – Chris Schenkel
- 1981 – Curt Gowdy
- 1982 – Ray Scott
- 1983 – Jack Brickhouse
- 1984 – Shirley Povich
- 1985 – Si Burick
- 1986 – Bob Prince
- 1986 – Don Dunphy
- 1986 – Jimmy Cannon
- 1987 – Jim McKay
- 1987 – Will Grimsley
- 1988 – Fred Russell
- 1988 – Harry Caray
- 1988 – Jack Murphy
- 1989 – Furman Bisher
- 1989 – Ernie Harwell
- 1990 – Dave Anderson
- 1990 – Jack Buck
- 1990 – Knute Rockne
- 1990 – Ronald Reagan
- 1991 – Blackie Sherrod
- 1991 – Vin Scully
- 1992 – Dick Connor
- 1993 – Howard Cosell
- 1993 – Marty Glickman
- 1993 – Murray Olderman
- 1994 – Edwin Pope
- 1994 – John Carmichael
- 1994 – Pat Summerall
- 1995 – Keith Jackson
- 1995 – Mel Durslag
- 1996 – Dan Jenkins
- 1996 – Dick Enberg
- 1997 – Chick Hearn
- 1997 – Bob Broeg
- 1998 – Al Michaels
- 1998 – Frank Deford
- 1999 – John Steadman*
- 1999 – Jon Miller
- 2000 – Jerry Izenberg
- 2000 – Jim Simpson
- 2001 – George Vecsey
- 2001 – Jack Whitaker
- 2001 – W.C. Heinz
- 2002 – Bob Murphy
- 2002 – Bud Collins
- 2003 – Bob Wolff
- 2003 – Will McDonough
- 2004 – Jerome Holtzman
- 2004 – Joe Garagiola
- 2005 – Marty Brennaman
- 2005 – Sally Jenkins
- 2006 – (no induction)
- 2007 – Dave Kindred
- 2007 – Verne Lundquist
- 2008 – Harry Kalas
- 2008 – Mary Garber
- 2009 – Larry Munson
- 2009 – Leigh Montville
- 2010 – John Madden
- 2010 – Peter Gammons
- 2011 – Bob Ryan
- 2011 – Bob Uecker
- 2011 – Brent Musburger
- 2012 – Bob Costas
- 2012 – John Feinstein
- 2013 – Mitch Albom
- 2013 – Dick Vitale
- 2014 – Marv Albert
- 2014 – Rick Reilly
- 2015 – Hal McCoy
- 2015 – Bill Raftery
- 2015 – Dick Schaap
- 2015 – Lesley Visser
- 2016 – Chris Berman
- 2016 – Billy Packer
- 2016 – David Halberstam
- 2016 – Gary Smith
- 2017 – Frank Gifford
- 2017 – Linda Cohn
- 2017 – Sam Lacy
- 2017 – Mike Lupica
- 2018 – Thomas Boswell
- 2018 – Woody Durham
- 2018 – Bryant Gumbel
- 2018 – Dick Weiss
- 2019 – Mike Emrick
- 2019 – Bob Ley
- 2019 – Peter King
- 2019 – Tony Kornheiser
- 2020 – Skip Caray
- 2020 – Cawood Ledford
- 2020 – Dan Patrick
- 2020 – Tom Verducci
- 2020 – Michael Wilbon
- 2020 – Dick Young
- 2021 – Bill King
- 2021 – Larry Merchant
- 2021 – William Nack
- 2021 – Jim Nantz
- 2021 – William C. Rhoden
- 2021 – Dick Stockton
- 2021 – Rick Telander
- 2022 – Hubie Brown
- 2022 – Curry Kirkpatrick
- 2022 – Jackie MacMullan
- 2022 – Stuart Scott
- 2023 – Lee Corso
- 2023 – Bill Plaschke
- 2023 – Dan Kelly
- 2023 – Roger Angell
- 2024 – Joe Buck
- 2024 – Andrea Kremer
- 2024 – Jayson Stark
- 2024 – Tim McCarver
- 2024 – Roger Kahn
- 2025 – Mike Tirico
- 2025 – Charlie Jones
- 2025 – Dan Shaughnessy
- 2025 – Wendell Smith

== See also ==
- Baseball Writers' Association of America (BBWAA)
- National Collegiate Baseball Writers Association
- Pro Basketball Writers Association
- United States Basketball Writers Association (college)
- Football Writers Association of America (college)
- Pro Football Writers Association
- Professional Hockey Writers Association
- Boxing Writers Association of America (BWAA)
- National Turf Writers Association
- New Jersey Sports Writers Association
- New York State Sportswriters Association
- Philadelphia Sports Writers Association
