= Hal McCoy =

American sportswriter

- Born: October 18, 1940 (age 85); Akron, Ohio, U.S.
- Other name: "Hal" MacCoy Jr.
- Education: Kent State University School of Journalism.
- Occupation: American Sports Writer

Harold Stanley McCoy Jr. (born October 18, 1940) is an American sportswriter. McCoy was a beat writer for the Dayton Daily News (Dayton, Ohio), covering the Cincinnati Reds baseball team. He still covers all Reds home games, writing a blog for the Dayton Daily News and for his own web-site, halmccoy.com. He also writes for pressprosmagazine.com. He was honored by the Baseball Writers' Association of America (BBWAA) in 2002 as the winner of the J. G. Taylor Spink Award "for meritorious contributions to baseball writing." He gained national attention in 2003 when he continued to cover the Reds despite strokes in both his eyes that left him legally blind.

== Education ==
He is an honors graduate from the Kent State University School of Journalism. He played first base at Kent on a partial baseball scholarship.

== Writing career ==
McCoy has covered the Cincinnati Reds since 1973. He was at the forefront of the Pete Rose investigation, breaking many stories during the 1989 season while also covering the Reds on a daily basis. McCoy also covered the infamous reign of former Reds CEO Marge Schott, the 1990 World Champion Reds, multiple baseball strikes and Reds ownership changes. Unable to travel to Philadelphia for the NLDS in 2010, he broadcast live from his home on the post-game show for Games 1 and 2 on FOX Sports Ohio's post-game wrapup.

He has won 52 Ohio and national writing awards and was the first non-Cincinnati newsperson elected to the Cincinnati Journalists Hall of Fame. McCoy has been the Cincinnati BBWAA Chapter Chair 22 times and was the BBWAA national president in 1997. He is the third writer from the Dayton Daily News to win the Spink Award, joining Si Burick (1982) and Ritter Collett (1991). He was inducted into the National Sports Media Hall of Fame in 2015. In 2016, he was inducted into the Dayton Region Walk of Fame, complete with a sidewalk plaque on Dayton's West Third Street. In 2015 the press box at legendary Howell Field in Dayton was named The Hal McCoy Press Box.

On June 8, 2015, McCoy was inducted in the National Sportscasters and Sportswriters Association's Hall of Fame.

== Retirement ==
On August 6, 2009, McCoy announced in his blog that he was retiring at the end of the 2009 Cincinnati Reds season. He stated that the Dayton Daily News "will no longer cover the Cincinnati Reds the same way it has in the past" because "they just can't afford the more than a quarter of a million dollars a year" it costs to send him coast-to-coast.

In response to a common misconception that the Daily News was forcing him to retire, McCoy wrote on August 7, 2009:

... I was NOT forced into retirement. I did not have to accept the buyout, which is a generous one year's salary - one year's pay for doing nothing, of which I've always been extremely competent at doing.

It is MY choice to retire and my choice to take the buyout. I was not forced, coerced or threatened.

Did I want to continue covering the Cincinnati Reds and major-league baseball? Absolutely. Positively. Definitely. But these are hard economic times and the newspaper is unable to do that at this time.

Despite no longer providing a print column for the Daily News, McCoy maintains a regular online blog published through this publication's website titled "The Real McCoy" and continues to provide contributions to the Dayton Daily News from time-to-time.

Hal currently works with Fox Sports Ohio, where he continues to cover the Cincinnati Reds.

== Eye condition ==
In 2001, McCoy's eyesight started to fail and the vision in his right eye blurred. Doctors diagnosed an eye condition that affects perhaps five percent of the population. He had a stroke in the optic nerve that left him with a permanent blurry spot. Although there was only a 15 percent chance he'd have a stroke in the left eye, he awoke in 2003 to find the vision in his left eye had blurred even worse because of another stroke. Tests determined that he has two small spots in his vision where he can see clearly. He has no peripheral vision.

With his vision severely impaired, McCoy struggled during his trip to spring training in 2003. He considered retiring but cites a pep talk by then-Reds player Aaron Boone ("You can still do it. We'll help you.") as a reason he kept working. McCoy learned to adapt to the condition. He had his scorebook enlarged, uses a magnifying glass for small print, follows the game by TV monitor, and writes on a large-screen laptop with enlarged print. Because his sight has left him unable to drive, he advertised on his blog for a chauffeur; he received over 400 applications but only interviewed Ray Snedegar, a recently widowed Dayton-area military veteran and part-time hearse driver of about the same age as McCoy. Since then, Snedegar has driven McCoy to every Reds home game that McCoy has covered.
