= Dave Anderson (sportswriter) =

American sportswriter (1929–2018)

- Born: David Poole Anderson; May 6, 1929; Troy, New York, U.S.
- Died: October 4, 2018 (aged 89); Cresskill, New Jersey, U.S.
- Education: College of the Holy Cross (BA)
- Occupations: Sportswriter; journalist; author; commentator
- Years active: 1951–2018
- Spouse: Maureen Young
- Children: 4
- Awards: Pulitzer Prize for Commentary (1981)

David Poole Anderson (May 6, 1929 – October 4, 2018) was an American journalist and sportswriter based in New York City. He won the 1981 Pulitzer Prize for Commentary for his distinguished commentary on sporting events. He was the author of 21 books and more than 350 magazine articles.

== Early life and education ==
Anderson was born on May 6, 1929, in Troy, New York, to Robert and Josephine (née David) Anderson. His father was the advertising director of the newspaper The Troy Times; his grandfather had been the publisher. He was raised in Bay Ridge, Brooklyn, and graduated from Xavier High School in 1947. At age 16, Anderson received his first job in the newspaper industry as a messenger for The Sun.

After high school, Anderson graduated from the College of the Holy Cross in Worcester, Massachusetts, with a Bachelor of Arts in English literature in 1951. As an undergraduate at Holy Cross, he was editor of the school newspaper, The Tomahawk, and worked as a sportswriter for a college magazine. In his last year of college, he wrote a senior thesis on the Shakespeare plays Titus Andronicus and Coriolanus.

== Early career ==
Following his graduation from Holy Cross in 1951, Anderson joined the Brooklyn Eagle as a clerk. The position had opened after the newspaper acquired a teletype machine from the Daily Racing Form; within a year, sports editor Lou Niss began assigning Anderson to cover games involving the New York Yankees and New York Giants. In May 1953, when the Eagle's regular Brooklyn Dodgers beat writer Harold C. Burr broke his hip, the 24-year-old Anderson was assigned to replace him. He covered the Dodgers for the remainder of that season and throughout 1954, reporting on a team that included Jackie Robinson, Pee Wee Reese, Duke Snider, Roy Campanella, and Gil Hodges. Anderson was preparing to travel to spring training in 1955 when a strike suspended publication of the Eagle; the newspaper closed six weeks later.

After the Eagle closed, Anderson joined the New York Journal-American, initially as a sports columnist for the newspaper's Brooklyn edition. Later in 1955 he moved to its general sports staff, where his assignments included the Dodgers, the New York Rangers, tennis, and the New York Giants football team. He served as the Journal-American's Rangers beat writer from 1955 until 1964. On September 24, 1957, Anderson filled in for the paper's regular Dodgers reporter at the team's final game at Ebbets Field; he later recalled that he and reporter Bill Roeder were the last two sportswriters to leave the ballpark following the game.

Alongside his newspaper reporting, Anderson began writing longer magazine features. In 1961, Sports Illustrated published his retrospective on Joe DiMaggio's 56-game hitting streak, "The Longest Hitting Streak in History". In 1964, Journal-American sports editor Max Kase assigned him to cover boxing, beginning what became a major focus of Anderson's career. That year Anderson profiled an aging Sugar Ray Robinson for True magazine in "The Longest Day of Sugar Ray"; the article received the 1965 E. P. Dutton Award for best magazine sports story.

In April 1966, as the Journal-American prepared to merge with the World-Telegram and the Herald Tribune, Anderson accepted a severance package from the newspaper. He was hired a week later by The New York Times as a general-assignment sportswriter.

== The New York Times ==
After moving to The New York Times, Anderson was given a regular column in 1971. In 1972, he won the E.P. Dutton Award for the best sports feature story of the year, the return of the heavyweight champion Joe Frazier to his Beaufort, South Carolina hometown (he won a Page One Award for the same story). He collaborated on a book, Always on the Run, with Miami Dolphin football players Larry Csonka and Jim Kiick that was published in 1973. It was one of 21 books he wrote or co-wrote in his career. In 1974, Anderson won the Nat Fleischer Award for excellence in boxing journalism.

In 1981, he became the second sportswriter to win the Pulitzer Prize for Commentary. His Pulitzer citation particularly noted his work on six columns he wrote in 1980, especially one entitled The Food On a Table At the Execution describing the sacking of New York Yankees manager Dick Howser by owner George Steinbrenner. He was inducted into the National Sportscasters and Sportswriters Hall of Fame in Salisbury, North Carolina in 1990, joining three other past "Sports of The Times," columnists — Red Smith, Arthur Daley and John Kieran. Anderson was the 1994 winner of the Associated Press Sports Editors Red Smith Award for distinguished sports column writing. In 2005, he received the Dick Schaap Award for Outstanding Journalism. Anderson was inducted in the International Boxing Hall of Fame in 2006. Anderson retired from The Times in 2007, though he continued to contribute occasional columns, his last being an August 2017 article on the US Tennis Open.

In 1994, he received the Dick McCann Memorial Award from the Pro Football Hall of Fame for career excellence covering football. In 2014, he was honored with the PEN/ESPN Lifetime Achievement Award for Literary Sports Writing.

== Personal life ==
Anderson resided in Tenafly, New Jersey. His wife, Maureen, died in 2014; they had three children, one of whom, Steve, was an ESPN vice president. Anderson died on October 4, 2018, in Cresskill, New Jersey.

== Publications ==
=== Books ===
- Anderson, Dave (1965). Great Quarterbacks of the NFL. Random House.
- Anderson, Dave (1966). Great Pass Receivers of the NFL. Random House. ISBN 0394801962.
- Anderson, Dave (1967). Great Defensive Players of the NFL. Random House. ISBN 0394801970.
- Anderson, Dave (1969). Countdown to Super Bowl. Random House.
- Robinson, Sugar Ray; Anderson, Dave (1970). Sugar Ray. Viking Press. ISBN 0670681415.
- Csonka, Larry; Kiick, Jim; Anderson, Dave (1973). Always on the Run. Random House. ISBN 0394485890.
- Anderson, Dave (1973). The Return of a Champion: Pancho Gonzalez' Golden Year 1964. Prentice Hall. ISBN 0137786050.
- Robinson, Frank; Anderson, Dave (1976). Frank: The First Year. Holt, Rinehart and Winston. ISBN 0030149517.
- Anderson, Dave; Chass, Murray; Creamer, Robert W.; Rosenthal, Harold (1979). The Yankees: The Four Fabulous Eras of Baseball's Most Famous Team. Random House. ISBN 0394506901.
- Anderson, Dave (1979). Sports of Our Times. Random House. ISBN 0394501225.
- Madden, John; Anderson, Dave (1984). Hey, Wait a Minute (I Wrote a Book!). Villard Books. ISBN 0394531094.
- Anderson, Dave (1985). The Cubs. Random House.
- Anderson, Dave (1985). The Story of Football. Foreword by O. J. Simpson. William Morrow and Company. ISBN 0688056342.
- Madden, John; Anderson, Dave (1986). One Knee Equals Two Feet: And Everything Else You Need to Know about Football. Villard Books. ISBN 0394553284.
- Anderson, Dave (1988). The Story of Basketball. Foreword by Julius Erving. William Morrow and Company. ISBN 0688067484.
- Madden, John; Anderson, Dave (1988). One Size Doesn't Fit All: And Other Thoughts from the Road. Villard Books. ISBN 0394563131.
- Anderson, Dave (1991). In the Corner: Great Boxing Trainers Talk About Their Art. William Morrow and Company. ISBN 0688094465.
- Anderson, Dave (1994). Pennant Races: Baseball at Its Best. Doubleday. ISBN 0385425732.
- Anderson, Dave (1996). The Story of the Olympics. Foreword by Carl Lewis. William Morrow and Company. ISBN 0688129544.
- Madden, John; Anderson, Dave (1996). All Madden: Hey, I'm Talking Pro Football!. HarperCollins. ISBN 0060172053.
- Anderson, Dave (1998). The Story of Golf. Foreword by Jack Nicklaus. William Morrow and Company. ISBN 0688157963.
