= List of sports journalism awards =

This list of sports journalism awards is an index to articles that describe notable awards for sports journalism, including both broadcast and print media. It also includes books about sports.

== List ==
Country	Award	Sponsor	Given for
Australia	Sport Australia Media Awards	Sport Australia	Excellence in Australian sports journalism and broadcasting
Canada	Brian Williams Media Award	Ontario Sports Hall of Fame	Person in the Ontario sports media who has distinguished themselves in their life's work, and career
Canada	Elmer Ferguson Memorial Award	Hockey Hall of Fame	Distinguished members of the newspaper profession whose words have brought honour to journalism and to hockey
Canada	Foster Hewitt Memorial Award	Hockey Hall of Fame	Members of the radio and television industry who make outstanding contributions to their profession and the game of ice hockey during their broadcasting career
Ireland	Irish Sports Book of the Year	Irish Book Awards	Best book
Ireland	William Hill Irish Sports Book of the Year	William Hill (bookmaker)	Sports books produced in Ireland
United Kingdom	Cricket Society/MCC Book of the Year	The Cricket Society	
United Kingdom	The Sports Book of the Year	British Book Awards	Best UK writers and their works
United Kingdom	British Sports Book Awards	National Sporting Club	Literary award for sports writing
United Kingdom	William Hill Sports Book of the Year	William Hill (bookmaker)	
United States	American Sportscasters Association Hall of Fame	American Sportscasters Association	Excellence in the field of sports broadcasting
United States	Casey Award	Spitball: The Literary Baseball Magazine	Best baseball book of the year
United States	Curt Gowdy Media Award	Naismith Memorial Basketball Hall of Fame	Outstanding basketball writers and broadcasters
United States	Dick McCann Memorial Award	Professional Football Writers of America	Long and distinguished reporting on professional football
United States	Dick Schaap Award for Outstanding Journalism	Nassau County Sports Commission	Journalist, in any medium, who best exemplifies the principles and talents of Dick Schaap
United States	Ford C. Frick Award	National Baseball Hall of Fame and Museum	Broadcaster for major contributions to baseball
United States	BBWAA Career Excellence Award	Baseball Writers' Association of America	Meritorious contributions to baseball writing
United States	National Sports Media Association Hall of Fame	National Sports Media Association	
United States	National Sportscaster of the Year	National Sports Media Association	
United States	National Sportswriter of the Year	National Sports Media Association	
United States	Online Journalism Awards, Sports Category	Online News Association	Honoring excellence and innovation in digital journalism
United States	PEN/ESPN Award for Literary Sports Writing	PEN America	Nonfiction book about sports
United States	Pete Rozelle Radio-Television Award	Pro Football Hall of Fame	Longtime exceptional contributions to radio and television in professional football
United States	Sigma Delta Chi Award for Sports Column Writing	Society of Professional Journalists	For excellence in sport journalism.
United States	Sports Emmy Award	National Academy of Television Arts and Sciences	Excellence in American sports television programming, including sports-related series, live coverage of sporting events, and best sports announcers
United States	Tom Borrelli Award	National Lacrosse League	Media Person of the Year

== See also ==
- Lists of awards
- List of journalism awards
- List of sport awards
