= Bob Ryan =

American sportswriter (born 1946)

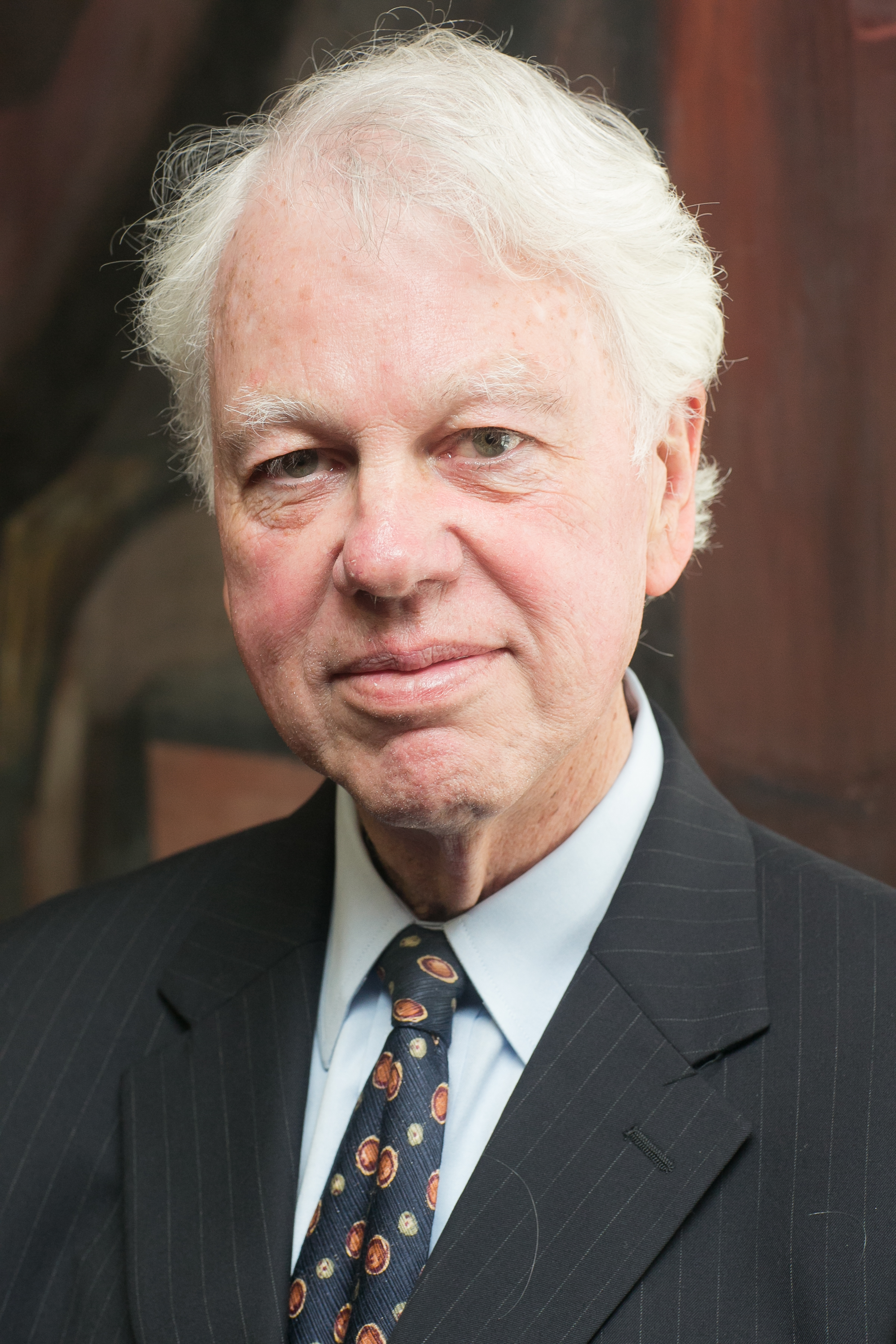
- Ryan in 2015
- Born: February 21, 1946 (age 80); Trenton, New Jersey
- Education: Boston College (BA)
- Occupations: Sportswriter, author
- Known for: Basketball reporting
- Spouse: Elaine (m. 1969)
- Children: Keith (1970–2008), Jessica (b. 1976)

Robert P. Ryan (born February 21, 1946) is an American sportswriter, formerly with The Boston Globe, and author. He has been described as "the quintessential American sportswriter" and a basketball guru, and is well known for his coverage of the sport including his famous stories covering the Boston Celtics in the 1970s. After graduating from Boston College, Ryan started as a sports intern for the Globe on the same day as Peter Gammons, and later worked with other notable Globe sportswriters Will McDonough and Leigh Montville. In early 2012, Ryan announced his retirement from sports writing after 44 years, effective at the conclusion of the 2012 Summer Olympics. His final column in the Globe was published August 12, 2012.

== Early life and education ==
Born in Trenton, New Jersey, Ryan grew up in a house "that revolved around going to games," and went to high school at the Lawrenceville School from 1960 to 1964. He graduated from Boston College as a history major in 1968.

== Career ==
In the fall of 1969, a vacancy on the Celtics beat of The Boston Globe was created, and Ryan got the job. Ryan was hired by the paper's morning sports editor Francis Rosa. While covering the Celtics, Ryan developed a close relationship with the Celtics organization. Ryan would even go out to dinner with the team. Ryan sat at the press table eight seats from the Celtics' bench, where colleagues referred to him as the "Commissioner", not unlike Peter Gammons's nickname. Boston Sports Media critic Bruce Allen has said, "His passion is not faked."

One night Hue Hollins, the referee, went to the press table to explain a call to Ryan during a time-out even though he was not obligated to. Another time Ryan wrote a column about the Washington Bullets' Rick Mahorn and how he played dirty under the hoop. When Mahorn was called for a foul Gene Shue, the Bullets' coach, turned around and said, "That's your fault, Bob Ryan, your fault!" Dennis Johnson was often annoyed with Ryan and would go up to the press table and say, "Hey, Bob, keep it down. We got a game going on here" when Ryan sideline coached. From Ryan's first column on Larry Bird headlined "Celtics draft Bird for oh what a future" to his last "Larry! Larry! Larry!" Ryan was always a fan of his and eventually co-authored a book with him.

In Tom Heinsohn's book Give 'em the Hook, Heinsohn was negative towards Ryan. Ryan, who began writing for the Globe in Heinsohn's rookie season as a coach, would make friends with the players and vent their feelings towards Heinsohn, their fans, and their teammates, claimed Heinsohn. Heinsohn didn't like how he didn't feel in control of his team. Heinsohn believed that Ryan started to "think of himself as another member of the family" and that he even started coaching the team through his beat stories. Heinsohn talked about Ryan's bloated ego and the fact that he thought himself as a basketball guru. Heinsohn also said while noting disapproval of Ryan that at the time anyone who lived in Boston and even remotely followed basketball read Ryan's columns. In his later years, Ryan has been less critical of Celtics coaches.

=== General sports columnist ===
In 1982, Ryan would hand the torch of the Globe Celtics beat to the not-yet well-known Dan Shaughnessy, and later Jackie MacMullan. He did this in order to go to Boston television station WCVB for a couple of years. Ryan ended up hating it and moved back to the Celtics beat in 1984 for two more seasons, before getting promoted to general sports columnist in 1989.

Ryan would cover 20 NBA finals, 20 Final Fours, nine World Series, five Super Bowls, the last seven Olympics and many other events. Later, Ryan became less basketball-oriented and more general sports-oriented. He continues to write for Basketball Times. Ryan is a voter for the Baseball Hall of Fame.

=== Retirement ===
At 60, Ryan wanted his retirement from the job to be graceful: "I'm not bitter. I enjoy my job and I still think I do it well, but they are chipping away, chipping away and they are making it far less pleasurable. I want to get out when I feel like getting out. If you stay around too long, there is no way you can dictate your terms," he said. Ryan also asked, "How do you explain to Stephen A. Smith that he has no idea of the game and how much fun it was? He thinks he knows everything, but he will never know what I know about the Celtics."

On February 14, 2012, during a podcast with Bill Simmons on Grantland.com, Ryan announced that he would retire after the 2012 Summer Olympics in London. Said Ryan, "I really and truly believe that my time has come and gone; that the dynamics of the business, of what it takes, what it means to be involved in the sports business with all the Tweeting and the blogging and all the stuff, and an audience with a different taste - it's not me anymore. I'm not comfortable." Ryan indicated that he would stay involved with sports in a part-time capacity after retirement, but is not interested in continuing at the pace he does now. Ryan's last day as a Red Sox reporter was July 16, 2012.

Ryan's final column in The Boston Globe was published August 12, 2012. He continues writing on a part-time basis as a columnist emeritus. He also remains a regular on ESPN's Around The Horn and occasionally guest hosts Pardon the Interruption with Michael Wilbon or Tony Kornheiser.

In March 2017, Ryan launched his own podcast, Bob Ryan's Boston Podcast. He has hosted many well-known former Boston athletes such as Larry Bird, Steve Grogan, Danny Ainge, Troy Brown, and Dave Cowens. Other well-known sports figures such as former NBA commissioner David Stern have also been guests.

After retiring, Ryan became the Sports Reporter in Residence at High Point University.

== Awards ==
- Ryan was voted by the National Sportscasters and Sportswriters Association the National Sportswriter of the Year four times: in 2000, 2007, 2008, and 2009
- Ryan has been inducted into the College Basketball Writers Hall of Fame and the New England Basketball Hall of Fame
- In 1996, Ryan earned the Curt Gowdy Award from the Basketball Hall of Fame
- In 2000, the Associated Press honored him as the "National Sportswriter of the Year"
- In 2006, Ryan earned the Dick Schaap Award for Outstanding Journalism
- In 2015, Ryan was bestowed the PEN/ESPN Lifetime Achievement Award for Literary Sports Writing

== Television and radio work ==
Radio

- The Bob Ryan Report on Loren and Wally (WROR-FM): Every Thursday morning at 7:50 a.m. he goes on to give his opinion about Boston sports.
- Ryan contributes to Michael Felger's show. He used to contribute to Dennis and Callahan on WEEI-FM.
- "Roundtable" (featuring Ryan) on NPR's On Point to talk about the decline in basketball viewership.
- Ryan is a weekly contributor to the Marty and Miller radio program on KXNO in Des Moines, Iowa, and is a frequent guest on Downtown with Rich Kimball on Stephen King's WZON in Bangor, Maine.
- The Tony Kornheiser Show; Ryan has appeared on the first episode of most of Kornheiser's show incarnations. Kornheiser calls Ryan "the quintessential American sportswriter".

Television

- On June 26, 2007, Ryan's show, Globe 10.0, made its premiere on the New England Sports Network (NESN). The half hour show, which airs every Tuesday, Wednesday and Thursday, features Ryan interviewing different The Boston Globe sports writers on ten issues related to New England sports. It was canceled by NESN in December 2008, but continued on The Boston Globe website.
- Ryan is also a frequent guest host on ESPN's Pardon the Interruption and guest on The Sports Reporters.
- He was a regular contributor on the show Around the Horn.

In addition, Bill Simmons has called him "the best basketball writer ever." Paul Silas joked on Cold Pizza while Ryan was a guest, that all Bob Ryan's success was due to him.

== Controversies ==
=== Joumana Kidd comments ===
In May 2003, Ryan appeared on Sports Final, a local sports talk show airing on WBZ-TV. At that time, Ryan said that Joumana Kidd, then-wife of then-New Jersey Nets guard Jason Kidd needed someone to "smack" her for taking her son T.J., then four years old, to NBA playoff night games where they could be taunted. He accused Joumana of being an exhibitionist and using the child as a prop to get television time. The show's host, Bob Lobel, asked Ryan to retract his statement immediately:

- Lobel: "You just don't want to smack her. You don't mean to say that."
- Ryan: "Alright."
- Lobel: "I mean. Do you? Really, do you? Tell me you don't."
- Ryan: "Why should I say anything different here than I said all last playoffs last year?"

The comments struck a chord because in 2001, Joumana Kidd had been the victim of domestic violence by then-husband Jason. Ryan returned to Boston to meet with executives at the Globe. Ryan publicly apologized, but the Globe still suspended him and barred him from television for one month. "Four weeks took my breath away. But I'll abide by it," he later said. Then Massachusetts Governor Mitt Romney chastised Ryan for his comments.

=== Theo Epstein confrontation ===
Ryan had a run-in with Red Sox general manager Theo Epstein. In November 2006, he had a small unfriendly exchange with Epstein saying "on behalf of an eager constituency, I hope the rumor (of a J. D. Drew deal) isn't true."

== Personal life ==
Ryan and his wife Elaine, who have been married since 1969, have a daughter Jessica and a son Keith, who died in 2008. They are grandparents of triplets. The dedication page in Forty Eight Minutes, one of Ryan's books, reads: "To Elaine Ryan: In the next life, maybe you'll get a nine-to-five man who makes seven figures." Ryan has also done humanitarian fundraisers for years to help inner-city teenagers with their educations. Ryan lives in Hingham, Massachusetts.

=== Son's death ===
On January 28, 2008, Ryan's 37-year-old son Keith was found dead in his home in Islamabad, Pakistan. Initial reports indicated that his death was an apparent suicide; however, reports in the Pakistani newspapers Dawn and The News International indicated that Ryan's death could be investigated as a murder. A State Department spokesperson would only say that the death was under investigation. Bob Ryan released the following statement: "Everyone is devastated. I am well aware of these reports and we are very concerned about that. (But) we have no reason at this time to doubt the official version".

Keith had been working in Pakistan since December 2006 as an attache for the U.S. Immigration and Customs Enforcement agency. Keith was a graduate of Hingham High School (1988), Trinity College, the London School of Economics and Boston College Law School. He had previously worked for the U.S. Border Patrol, LAPD and the Immigration and Naturalization Service, where he was assigned to the violent gang task force. Keith was married to Kate and had three children, Conor, John, and Amelia, who live in Silver Spring, Maryland.

== Bibliography ==
- Wait Till I Make the Show: Baseball in the Minor Leagues (1974), ISBN 978-0-316-76367-7
- Celtics Pride: The rebuilding of Boston's world championship basketball team (1975), ISBN 978-0-316-76368-4
- The Pro Game: The World of Professional Basketball (1975), photography by Mel DiGiacomo and Ross Lewis, ISBN 978-0-07-054357-7
- Hondo: Celtic Man in Motion (1977), with John Havlicek, ISBN 978-0-13-394601-7
- Forty Eight Minutes (1987), with Terry Pluto, ISBN 978-0-02-036050-6
- Cousy on the Celtic Mystique (1988), with Bob Cousy, ISBN 978-0-07-013332-7
- Drive: The Story of My Life (1989), with Larry Bird, foreword by Magic Johnson, ISBN 978-0-553-28758-5
- Boston Celtics: The History, Legends, and Images of America's Most Celebrated Team (1990), photography by Dick Raphael, foreword by Red Auerbach, ISBN 978-0-201-15326-2
- The Four Seasons (1997), ISBN 978-1-57028-127-3
- The Road to the Super Bowl (1997), ISBN 978-1-57028-136-5
- When Boston Won the World Series: A Chronicle of Boston's Remarkable Victory in the First Modern World Series of 1903 (2003), ISBN 978-0-7624-1466-6
- Scribe: My Life in Sports (2014), ISBN 978-1-62040-506-2
- In Scoring Position: 40 Years of a Baseball Love Affair (2022), with Bill Chuck, ISBN 978-1-62937-945-6

| Preceded by Jack Barry | Boston Globe Celtics beat writer 1968–1982 | Succeeded by Dan Shaughnessy |
| Preceded by Dan Shaughnessy | Boston Globe Celtics beat writer 1984–1986 (interim) | Succeeded by Michael Vega |
