= Peter Gammons =

American sportswriter (born 1945)

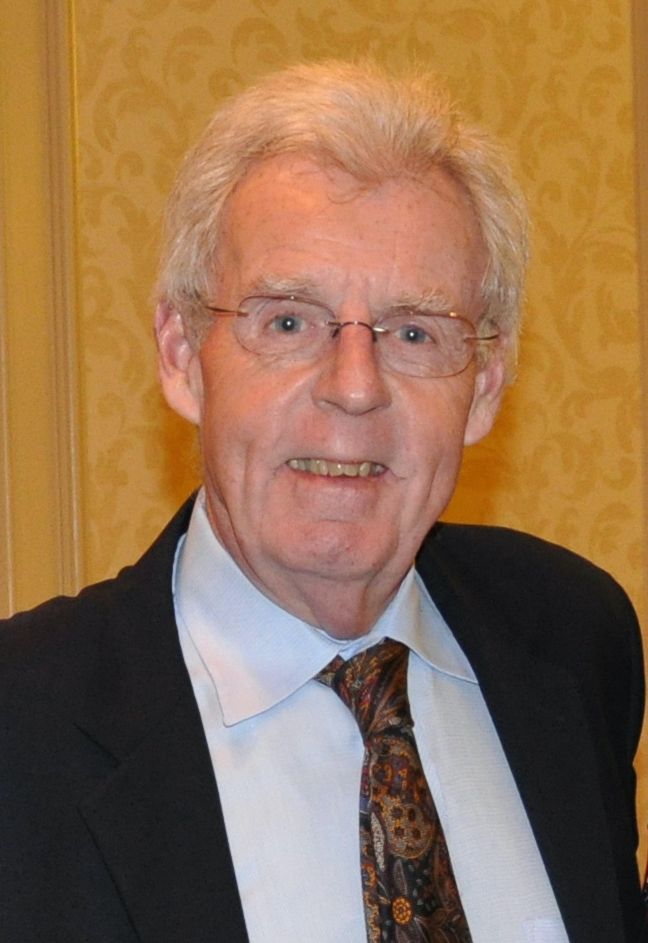
- Gammons in 2010
- Born: April 9, 1945 (age 81); Boston, Massachusetts, U.S.
- Other name: The Goose
- Education: University of North Carolina at Chapel Hill
- Occupation: Sportswriter
- Title: Major League Baseball Analyst
- Spouse: Gloria
- Awards: J. G. Taylor Spink Award (2004)

Peter Gammons (born April 9, 1945) is an American sportswriter and television journalist. He is the recipient of the J. G. Taylor Spink Award for outstanding baseball writing, given by the Baseball Writers' Association of America.

== Early life and education ==
In 1945, Gammons was born in Boston, Massachusetts. He was raised in Groton, Massachusetts and attended Groton School. In 1965, he graduated from Groton.

Gammons attended the University of North Carolina at Chapel Hill where he was a member of St. Anthony Hall. He worked for the university's student-run newspaper, The Daily Tar Heel, and the student-run radio station, WXYC. He graduated in 1969.

== Career ==
=== Print journalist ===
After graduating in 1969, he began his journalism career at The Boston Globe. Gammons was a featured writer at The Boston Globe for many years as the main journalist covering the Boston Red Sox. (1969–1975, 1978–1986), or as a national baseball columnist. For many years he was a colleague of other legendary Globe sports writers Will McDonough, Bob Ryan and Leigh Montville. Between his two stints as a baseball columnist with the Globe, he was the lead baseball columnist for Sports Illustrated (1976–78, 1986–90), where he covered baseball, hockey, and college basketball. Gammons also wrote a column for The Sporting News in the 1980s.

In 1985, Gammons published his only book, Beyond the Sixth Game.

=== Television journalist ===
In 1988, he joined ESPN, where he served primarily as an in-studio analyst. During the baseball season, he appeared nightly on Baseball Tonight and had regular spots on SportsCenter, ESPNEWS and ESPN Radio. He wrote an Insider column for ESPN.com and also wrote for ESPN The Magazine. The Globe reprinted some of his ESPN columns well into the 1990s. In 2006, Gammons was named as one of two field-level reporters for ESPN's Sunday Night Baseball, joining Bonnie Bernstein. He held that position through the 2008 season, when he moved exclusively to baseball.

After being out for illness, Gammons returned to ESPN on Wednesday, September 20, 2006. He reported from Fenway Park on the 6 P.M. edition of SportsCenter and the 7 P.M. edition of Baseball Tonight. Gammons resumed his regular reporting coverage during the 2007 baseball season.

After 20 years with ESPN, on December 8, 2009, Gammons announced he would leave ESPN to pursue "new challenges" and a "less demanding schedule". Gammons joined the MLB Network and MLB.com as on-air and online analyst. He also works for NESN.

Gammons is on the 10-person voting panel for the Fielding Bible Awards, an alternative to the Gold Glove Awards in Major League Baseball.

== Honors ==
- Gammons was voted by the National Sportscasters and Sportswriters Association the National Sportswriter of the Year in 1989, 1990, and 1993
- Gammons was awarded an honorary Poynter Fellow from Yale University
- In 2004, Gammons was the recipient of the J. G. Taylor Spink Award for outstanding baseball writing given by the BBWAA
- The City of Boston proclaimed January 9, 2009, to be Peter Gammons Day. The proclamation was made by Michael Ross, president of the Boston City Council at the Hot Stove Cool Music Sports Roundtable at Fenway Park. 2010 marked the 10th anniversary of Hot Stove Cool Music, a charitable concert benefiting the Foundation To Be Named Later. At this event, Theo Epstein, Vice President and General Manager of the Boston Red Sox, announced a new scholarship in Gammons' name. The "Peter Gammons - Foundation To Be Named Later Scholarship presented by RISO" enables select Boston Public Schools students to attend college who otherwise might not have the chance.
- In 2018, Gammons was inducted into the Cape Cod Baseball League Hall of Fame in recognition of his longtime support of the league.

== Music ==
Gammons has a penchant for indie rock and the blues, and is active in the Boston indie rock scene when his other commitments allow him time; he has been sighted at several Midnight Oil shows and has mentioned the band in several columns. He is also a fan of Pearl Jam and has talked about experiences at concerts as well as previous albums (as heard on various ESPN Radio shows). With the assistance of a band of Boston musicians and former Boston Red Sox General Manager Theo Epstein, Gammons plays a Fender Stratocaster and sings at the annual Hot Stove, Cool Music concert event to benefit Theo and Paul Epstein's Foundation To Be Named Later, a charity that raises funds and awareness for non-profit agencies serving disadvantaged youth in the Greater Boston area.

Gammons' debut album, Never Slow Down, Never Grow Old, was released on July 4, 2006. Gammons sang and played guitar on this collection of originals and covers that includes The Clash's Death or Glory and Warren Zevon's Model Citizen. Proceeds again went to Epstein's charity.

Gammons founded the Hot Stove Cool Music benefit concert series with sportswriter Jeff Horrigan, Casey Riddles, Debbi Wrobleski, Mindy d'Arbeloff and singer Kay Hanley in December 2000. The fundraiser now takes place twice each year with one show in January and another in July or August.

Gammons is tightly connected to the Boston rock scene. He even served as minister at the November 2007 marriage of bassist Ed Valauskas (Gravel Pit, the Gentlemen) and singer Jennifer D'Angora (Downbeat 5, the Dents, Jenny Dee and the Deelinquents).

The Boston Baseball Band wrote a song about Gammons called "Jammin' With Peter Gammons."

== Personal life ==
Gammons lives in Bourne, Massachusetts, located on the Cape Cod peninsula, with his wife, Gloria.

On June 27, 2006, Gammons was stricken with the rupture of a brain aneurysm in the morning near his home in Bourne, Massachusetts. He was initially rushed to Falmouth Hospital in Cape Cod before being airlifted to Brigham and Women's Hospital in Boston, Massachusetts. At Brigham and Women's, Gammons' operation was performed by neurosurgeon Dr. Arthur Day, who was a friend to late Red Sox hitter Ted Williams. Sportswriter Bob Ryan of The Boston Globe reported that Gammons was expected to be in intensive care for 10 to 12 days. He was resting in intensive care following the operation, and doctors listed him in "good" condition the following day. On July 17, he was released from the hospital and entered the Rehabilitation Hospital of the Cape and Islands. On August 19, Gammons made his first public appearance since the aneurysm rupture at Fenway Park when the Red Sox played the Yankees.

== Bibliography ==
- 1985 Beyond the Sixth Game, ISBN 978-0-395-35345-5
- 2026 It's All About the Players, ISBN 978-1-538-77720-6
