= Dick Schaap Award for Outstanding Journalism =

American journalism award

The Dick Schaap Award for Outstanding Journalism was established in 2002 and can be given to any journalist who "best exemplifies the principles and talents of Dick Schaap". It is named for sports writer Dick Schaap and is presented by the Nassau County Sports Commission. The award recipient is determined by confidential balloting of the Dick Schaap Selection Committee, which is composed of respected members of the media and chaired by Schaap's son, ESPN reporter Jeremy Schaap.

== Recipients ==
- 2002 – Jim McKay, ABC Sports
- 2003 – Frank Deford, Sports Illustrated
- 2004 – Bob Costas, NBC and HBO Sports
- 2005 – Dave Anderson, The New York Times
- 2006 – Bob Ryan, Boston Globe
- 2007 – Lance Williams and Mark Fainaru-Wada, San Francisco Chronicle
- 2008 – Mitch Albom, Detroit Free Press
- 2009 – no recipient
- 2010 – Mary Carillo, NBC and HBO Sports
- 2011 – Dave Kindred, Golf Digest and National Sports Journalism Center
