= Dan Shaughnessy =

American sports writer (born 1953)

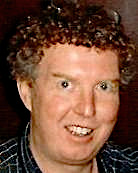
- Born: July 20, 1953 (age 73); Groton, Massachusetts, U.S.
- Education: College of the Holy Cross (BA)
- Occupations: Sports journalist; columnist; television personality
- Years active: 1977–present
- Employer: The Boston Globe (since 1981)
- Spouse: Marilou
- Children: 3
- Relatives: Meghann Shaughnessy (niece)
- Awards: J. G. Taylor Spink Award (2016); Red Smith Award (2026)

Daniel Shaughnessy (born July 20, 1953) is an American sports writer. He has written for The Boston Globe since 1981, including stints as beat writer covering the Boston Red Sox and Boston Celtics. He is a recipient of the J. G. Taylor Spink Award, given by the Baseball Hall of Fame, and the Red Smith Award, given by the Associated Press Sports Editors (APSE) organization.

== Early life and education ==
Shaughnessy was born in Groton, Massachusetts. After graduating from Groton High School, Shaughnessy attended the College of the Holy Cross, graduating in 1975.

== Career ==
Shaughnessy worked part time for The Boston Globe from 1973 to 1977. He has noted that his first byline with the Globe was on October 4, 1973, when he was a 20-year-old college junior. Articles by Shaughnessy about the Boston Neighborhood Basketball League appeared in the Globe during the summer of 1974.

Shaughnessy served as a beat reporter covering the Baltimore Orioles for The Baltimore Evening Sun in 1977 and 1978. He then was the national baseball writer for The Washington Star from 1979 until the newspaper folded in 1981. He returned to The Boston Globe in September 1981. At the Globe, he has served as the beat writer for the Boston Celtics and the Boston Red Sox, and has been a sports columnist since 1989.

Shaughnessy has authored or contributed to more than a dozen sports-related books, on topics including the fierce Red Sox–Yankees rivalry. His book The Curse of the Bambino details the travails of the Red Sox and their search for a World Series championship after selling Babe Ruth to the New York Yankees. He subsequently wrote Reversing the Curse after the Red Sox won the 2004 World Series.

Shaughnessy has been a contributor to ESPN The Magazine, and a regular guest on a Sunday night sports show, Sports Xtra. He has also discussed sports and current events on radio shows airing on WTKK; on ESPN's Rome Is Burning; and on NESN's SportsPlus and Globe 10.0. On July 9, 2008, he made his debut as a guest host on the ESPN show Pardon the Interruption. He also had a weekend radio show on WBZ-FM alongside Adam Jones.

The 1980s Boston Celtics team furnished Shaughnessy with the sobriquet "Shank" for the often unflattering and critical nature of his articles. Red Sox player Carl Everett, during a heated discussion with sportswriter Gordon Edes in September 2000, referred to Shaughnessy as the "curly-haired boyfriend", a nickname sometimes referenced by Red Sox fans.

In an October 2005 column, Shaughnessy revealed information detailing negotiations between then-Red Sox general manager Theo Epstein and Red Sox CEO Larry Lucchino. Shaughnessy and other Globe writers were accused by writers at the Boston Herald of routinely reporting information leaked from the Red Sox front office (the Red Sox were 17.75 percent owned by The New York Times Company, the Globe's parent company). Tony Massarotti, then a Boston Herald columnist, accused Red Sox management of smearing Epstein and suggested the Globe's coverage of the negotiations may be conflicted because of the Times ownership in the team. In the weeks leading up to Epstein's decision, Red Sox owner John Henry said the leaks "had to stop".

In 2013, Shaughnessy and Terry Francona released Francona, a biography focusing on Francona's years as manager of the Red Sox. The book immediately became a best-seller.

On December 8, 2015, Shaughnessy was named the 2016 recipient of the J. G. Taylor Spink Award, presented annually by the Baseball Writers' Association of America "for meritorious contributions to baseball writing". He was presented with the award during induction weekend at the National Baseball Hall of Fame in July 2016.

Shaughnessy was named the 2026 recipient of the Red Smith Award, presented annually by the Associated Press Sports Editors (APSE) organization for outstanding contributions to sports journalism. He was formally presented with the award in Arlington, Virginia, on July 17, 2026.

== Personal life ==
Shaughnessy is married to Marilou née Wit, with whom he has three children, Sarah, Kate, and Sam. He is the uncle of tennis player Meghann Shaughnessy. He has received honorary degrees from Southern New Hampshire University and Nichols College.

== Bibliography ==
- 1987, One Strike Away: The Story of the 1986 Red Sox; ISBN 0-8253-0426-1
- 1990, The Curse of the Bambino; ISBN 978-0-525-24887-3
  - 2004, updated, The Curse of the Bambino; ISBN 0-525-24887-0
- 1991, Ever Green the Boston Celtics: A History in the Words of Their Players, Coaches, Fans and Foes, from 1946 to the Present; ISBN 0-312-06348-2
- 1994, Seeing Red: The Red Auerbach Story; ISBN 0-517-17217-8 (hardcover), ISBN 1-55850-548-2 (paperback)
- 1999, Fenway: A Biography in Words and Pictures, with Stan Grossfeld; ISBN 978-0395945568 (hardcover), ISBN 978-0618057092 (paperback)
  - 2007, Fenway, Expanded and Updated: A Biography in Words and Pictures, with Stan Grossfeld; ISBN 0-618-73736-7 (hardcover), ISBN 0-618-05709-9 (paperback)
- 2003, Spring Training: Baseball's Early Season, with Stan Grossfeld; ISBN 0-618-21399-6
- 2007, Senior Year: A Father, A Son, and High School Baseball. Houghton Mifflin Harcourt. 2007. ISBN 978-0-618-72905-0.
- 2010, At Fenway: Dispatches from Red Sox Nation; ISBN 0-609-80091-4
- 2013, Francona; ISBN 978-0-547-92817-3
- 2017, Reversing the Curse; ISBN 0-618-51748-0 (hardcover), ISBN 0-618-71191-0 (paperback)
- 2021, Wish It Lasted Forever: Life with the Larry Bird Celtics. Simon & Schuster. 2021. ISBN 978-1-982-16999-2.

Preceded by Bob Ryan	Boston Globe Celtics beat writer 1982–1984	Succeeded by Bob Ryan
