= Sitka Lutheran Church =

Lutheran church in Alaska, USA

Coordinates: 57.0497°N 135.3354°W

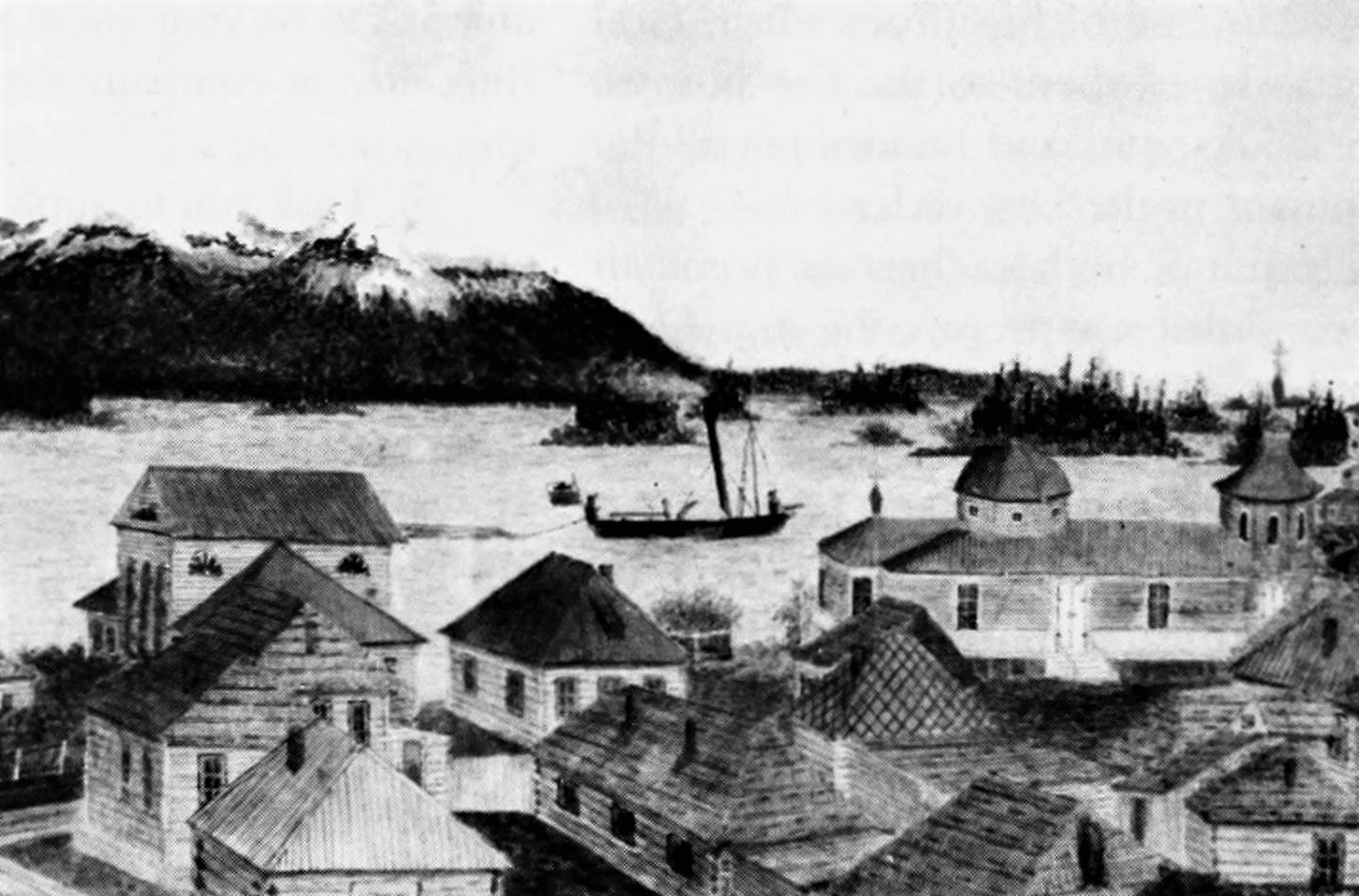
In this mid-19th century watercolor, the tall building to the left of the boat is the original Sitka Lutheran Church. The large domed building facing it is St. Michael's Cathedral.

Sitka Lutheran Church (Finnish: Sitkan luterilainen kirkko) is an Evangelical Lutheran Church in Sitka, Alaska. Its first building was constructed in 1843 on what is now 224 Lincoln Street and was the first Protestant church in Alaska. The original church was built and its congregation established through the efforts of Arvid Adolf Etholén, the eighth Russian governor of Alaska. The land on which the church was constructed was deeded to the congregation in perpetuity by the Russian government at the time of the Alaska Purchase. The current church building is the third to be constructed on the site and was completed in 1967. It contains many of the furnishings from the original church, including its historic pipe organ and the altarpiece by Berndt Godenhjelm.

== History ==
=== Establishment of the first church ===
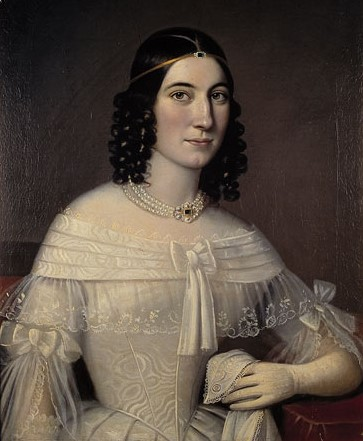
Margaretha Etholén (1814–1894), the devoutly Lutheran wife of Arvid Etholén, who was instrumental in establishing the church

Many of the workers who came to Alaska to work for the Russian-American Company were from Finland and the Baltic states and most were Lutherans. The settlement of New Archangel (now Sitka) was the capital of Russian America. However, for the first 35 years of its existence, the only church there was the Russian Orthodox Cathedral of St. Michael the Archangel. In 1839 Arvid Adolf Etholén, himself a Swedish-speaking Finn, was appointed the eighth governor of the colony by which time there were approximately 150 Lutherans working in New Archangel. At the urging of Etholén and Ferdinand von Wrangel, a previous manager of the Russian-American Company, the Russian government agreed to establish a Lutheran parish there which would be part of the Lutheran diocese of St. Petersburg. Etholén arrived in Sitka in 1840 with his young wife Margaretha who was a devout Lutheran and Uno Cygnaeus who was to be the first pastor. While the new church was being built, the congregation worshiped in one of the rooms of the governor's residence, Baranof Castle.

The new church was constructed opposite the Cathedral of St. Michael the Archangel and was officially consecrated on October 15, 1843. The building, which also contained a library and the pastor's residence, had no steeple. The Russian Orthodox bishop had insisted that it should not "look like a church" given its proximity to the cathedral. The books for the church library and many of the interior fittings for the church including the altar painting, The Transfiguration of Christ by Berndt Godenhjelm, were brought from Finland on the Etholéns' voyage to Alaska. The pulpit, from which sermons were preached in Finnish, German, and Swedish, was made from Sitka spruce by Finnish shipwrights working for the Russian-American Company. The church's pipe organ, made by Estonian organ maker Ernst Carl Kessler (1808-1863) in 1844 and shipped from Estonia to Alaska the next year, was a gift from Governor Etholén. Neither the Etholéns nor Uno Cygnaeus were to hear it played, as they had sailed back to Finland shortly before its arrival.

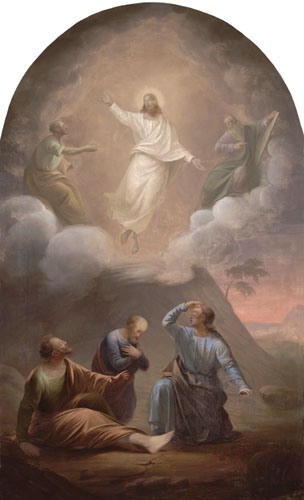
Godenhjelm's altarpiece from the original Sitka Lutheran Church. It is on display in the current church after restoration in 2004

Uno Cygnaeus was succeeded as the church's pastor by Gabriel Plathan and then by George Gustav Winter. Their ministries, like that of their predecessor, were restricted by the Russian Orthodox church in Sitka. Lutheran pastors were forbidden from educating or preaching to Native Alaskans and Creoles, and within the European population, they were only allowed to educate children whose parents were both Lutherans.

The Lutheran cemetery is very near the church on what is now Princess Way and was consecrated in 1840 when the congregation was still worshipping in the governor's residence. One of its first burials was the one-year-old son of Arvid and Margaretha Etholén who died in the autumn of 1841. Also buried there are Governor Johan Furuhjelm's sister Constance and Princess Aglaida Maksutov, the wife of Russian Alaska's last governor Prince Dmitry Maksutov.

=== Decline and revival ===
Ill-health forced the return of Pastor George Winter to Europe in 1865. He was not replaced as Russia was already in negotiations with the United States to sell its Alaskan territory. The congregation made do with lay preachers. In 1867, the Alaska Purchase was completed. The first Protestant service in Alaska to be conducted by an American took place in Sitka Lutheran Church on October 13, 1867, five days before the formal handover. The service was led by US Army Chaplain James O. Rayner. Two years later, William H. Seward who had engineered the Alaska Purchase visited Sitka and gave a lengthy speech in the church on what he saw as the future of the new territory. With the closure of the Russian-American company, the Finns and Baltic Germans who made up the bulk of the congregation returned to Europe, leaving only a few members. The church fell into increasing disrepair and was demolished in 1888. The lot on which it stood would remain empty for the next 54 years. Shortly before the demolition, Sheldon Jackson, a Presbyterian missionary, inspected the abandoned church and preserved the furnishings and organ by removing them to the museum he had established at the Presbyterian Mission. The Godenhjelm altarpiece had already been removed in 1873 and taken to St. Michael's Cathedral.

In 1895 a Sitka merchant tried to "jump the claim" to the empty lot. However, with the assistance of a visiting Lutheran minister from Pennsylvania, the 30-member congregation was able to prove that the land been deeded in perpetuity to the Lutheran congregation by the Russian government at the 1867 handover. Sitka's Lutherans continued to worship in private houses with lay preachers, but by 1935 the growing influx of Scandinavian immigrants had much increased the congregation. In 1940 the United Lutheran Church in America re-founded the church, provided a pastor (Hugh Dowler), and constructed a new building on the site of the original church. Designed in the Mission Revival style, the church was completed in 1942. Its lower level was used as a center for military personnel during World War II and after the war was used as a fisherman's center.

The church burnt to the ground on January 2, 1966 in a fire that destroyed much of downtown Sitka. It was rebuilt in a more contemporary style on the same site in 1967. In 1993, the new church also suffered a serious fire, but the organ and most of the furnishings, while damaged, were salvageable. After repair of the church fabric was complete, new stained glass windows by Dick Weiss were installed in the sanctuary. In 1999, after years of negotiation, the Russian Orthodox diocese handed back the deed to the Lutheran cemetery which it had appropriated in the late 19th century. The cemetery was rededicated on May 14, 2000 in the presence of Alaska's Lutheran bishop. That same year, the Russian Orthodox diocese also handed back Godenhjelm's painting of the Transfiguration of Christ. It was sent to Finland for restoration and was then exhibited in Finland, Russia, and the United States before returning to the church in 2004. The original gold leaf chandelier from the 1843 church has also been restored as has the Kessler organ, one of the few functioning swallow's nest organs in North America.

== Sources ==
- Arndt, Katherine; Pierce, Richard (2003). Construction History of Sitka, Alaska, as Documented in the Records of the Russian-American Company. Sitka National Historical Park: Historical Context Study.
- Dahl, David (1996). "Alaska's Oldest Organ Plays Again After a Century". The Tracker. Organ Historical Society, Vol. 40, No. 2.
- Enckell, Maria Jarlsdotter (2001). "Scandinavian Immigration to Russian Alaska, 1800-1867". Foundation for East European Family History Studies Journal, Vol. IX (PDF). pp. 106–114.
- Harris, Jerilynn (2012). Finding Aid: Sitka Lutheran Church Records, 1840-2012. Pacific Lutheran University, Archives and Special Collections.
- Kassel, Richard (2006). The Organ: An Encyclopedia. Routledge. ISBN 0415941741.
- Myers, William H. (1895). Through Wonderland to Alaska. Reading Times Print.
- Rabow-Edling, Susanna (2015). Married to the Empire: Three Governors' Wives in Russian America 1829-1864. University of Alaska Press. ISBN 978-1602232648.
- Sitka Lutheran Church Historical Committee (2008). The Finnish Connection. Sitka Lutheran Church. pp. 1, 2, 3, 4.
- Winquist, Alan H.; Rousselow-Winquist, Jessica (2006). Touring Swedish America. Minnesota Historical Society. ISBN 0873515595.
