= Will McDonough =

American sportswriter (1935–2003)

William McDonough (July 6, 1935 – January 9, 2003) was an American sportswriter for The Boston Globe who also worked as an on-air football reporter for CBS and NBC.

== Biography ==
=== Newspaper career ===
The youngest of nine children of Irish immigrants, McDonough grew up in working-class South Boston. He attended The English High School, where he starred in baseball as a pitcher and in football as a quarterback. While attending the Northeastern University School of Journalism, McDonough started at the Boston Globe as a co-op intern / copy boy in 1955 to cover school sports, and he was hired by the Globe full-time after graduation in 1957.

In 1960, after McDonough had been promoted to sportswriter, he was assigned as the beat reporter for the Boston Patriots of the start-up American Football League and remained one of the country's premier football reporters until his retirement in 2001. During his 40+ years writing career with the Globe (interrupted only by a brief departure in 1973), McDonough worked with other legendary Globe sportswriters such as Peter Gammons, Bob Ryan, and Leigh Montville. Beginning in 1993, he was named an associate editor of the Globe. Montville has said of McDonough: "He was the scoop guy. He always said: 'I can write better than anyone who can write faster, and I can write faster than anyone who can write better.'"

McDonough became a hero among Boston sportswriters after a 1979 altercation with Patriots cornerback Raymond Clayborn, in which the 44-year-old McDonough leveled Clayborn in the locker room after the third-year cornerback had poked him in the eye. However, McDonough's main fame was due to the number of "scoops" and exclusive stories that he broke while with the Globe. At the time of his death, NFL commissioner Paul Tagliabue called him the "most influential reporter covering the NFL."

=== Controversy ===
McDonough's co-workers and supporters referred to him as "Willie" and credited his ability to get such stories to his ability to "get anybody to the phone" and to parlay nuggets of information from his calls into bigger stories. However, even Globe management admitted that he "rewarded his friends and slammed his enemies" in his columns. His critics, meanwhile, said that he only "publishe[d] what's going to reinforce his sources, his friends, his contacts", referring to him as "a management stooge" and "Will the Shill".

Examples of this dichotomy marked his career. He regularly referred to superstar pitcher Roger Clemens as the "Texas Con Man" after Clemens' tenure with the Boston Red Sox; his bosses said that that was because he saw Clemens as a phony, potentially supported by later allegations of steroid use directed at Clemens, while others claimed that he was defending his friends John Harrington and Dan Duquette, who had stated that Clemens was in the "twilight of his career" in 1996—after which Clemens won four more Cy Young Awards as the best pitcher in the League (1997–98, 2001, 2004). McDonough also repeatedly referred to former Red Sox player Mo Vaughn as "Mo Money" after Vaughn turned down the Sox's contract offer before the 1998 season to become a free agent after the season. He was accused of chauvinism when he questioned the presence of women in the locker room as well as the legitimacy of allegations by then Boston Herald sportswriter Lisa Olson against New England Patriots players in the team locker room in 1990; McDonough claimed he was vindicated two years later when other Globe sportswriters acknowledged the presence of holes in Olson's credibility that were overlooked or ignored at the time, but others claimed that the Globe's report showed that the overall atmosphere of sexual harassment was worse than Olson had alleged.

One of McDonough's biggest scoops came during the week before Super Bowl XXXI when he broke the story that Patriots' head coach Bill Parcells, one of McDonough's best friends, was planning to leave the Patriots after the Super Bowl and become head coach of the New York Jets. The story was 100% correct but still generated controversy because of the contention by McDonough's detractors that Parcells' agent (who was also McDonough's agent) had planted the story at that time to maximize his negotiating leverage.

=== Broadcasting ===
In addition to newspaper reporting, McDonough was a pioneer among journalists who became broadcasters in the late 1970s and early 1980s while maintaining their newspaper positions. He originally was hired by CBS, later moving to NBC. His appearances included stints as part of NBC's NFL Live pregame show from 1991 to 1993. About his TV work, McDonough said, "I proved once and for all you don't have to be pretty to be on television." For one season, he also served as an analyst for New England Patriots preseason games. In 1994, NBC was paying him about $400,000 a year to appear on the network.

=== Personal life ===
McDonough was married twice, fathering three children (Sean, Erin and Terry) with his first wife Wilma and two (Ryan and Cara) with his second wife Denise. One of his three sons, Sean McDonough, is a sportscaster for ESPN and is also a Boston Red Sox announcer. Another son, Terry McDonough, was vice president, Player Personnel for the NFL's Arizona Cardinals. His third son, Ryan McDonough, was the general manager of the Phoenix Suns. Each of the three has a championship ring in a different sport: Sean as an announcer for the 2004 Boston Red Sox (baseball); Terry as a scout for the 2000 Baltimore Ravens (football); and Ryan as a special assistant/video analyst for the 2008 Boston Celtics (basketball).

McDonough remained lifelong friends with two other prominent South Boston Irishmen: Massachusetts political leader William "Billy" Bulger and his older brother, Boston organized crime boss James "Whitey" Bulger. He served as campaign manager for Billy's 1960 run for state representative, and he visited Whitey in Leavenworth Federal Penitentiary in the 1960s while the Boston Red Sox were in Kansas City. In return, in 1993 Billy successfully lobbied Cablevision to allow McDonough to provide commentary on the cable broadcast of the annual St. Patrick's Day breakfast hosted by Billy.

=== Death ===
McDonough died of a heart attack at his home in Hingham on January 9, 2003, at age 67. According to an interview with his son Sean, McDonough had been suffering from heart problems and an autopsy determined that he had undiagnosed cardiac amyloidosis. A research fund to cure cardiac amyloidosis was set up in his memory at the Brigham and Women's Hospital.
