= Rich Clarkson =

Rich Clarkson (born August 11, 1932) is a Denver, Colorado based photographer who has a long history covering American sports. Rich owns a production company, Clarkson Creative, that specializes in photography, video production, design, and book publishing among other things. In addition, his company has organized the photography educational workshops, Summit Series of Photography Workshops, for over 30 years. The small group also handles all championship photography for the NCAA (National Collegiate Athletic Association) and Colorado Rockies baseball club.

== Biography ==
=== Early life ===
Born in Oklahoma City, Clarkson moved to Lawrence, Kansas at age 3 where he would grow up above one of the town's greatest restaurants, The Colonial Tea Room. His grandmother, Fannie Murphy, owned the restaurant with his mother, Mary, working as a hostess and greeting guests in the dining room. The restaurant drew Kansas professors, local politicians, and businessmen, exposing the young Clarkson to those intellects daily.

=== Meeting the inventor of basketball ===
In 1939 at age 7, Clarkson and his friends snuck through the University of Kansas heating system to find their way into Robinson Gymnasium where the Kansas basketball team practiced. One day, the boys found the team in the middle of a workout, so they took a seat along the wall and watched coach Phog Allen instruct his team. When the coach spotted the boys during a water break, he introduced them to another guest at his practice. "Boys, why don't you meet the other gentleman who's watching the game?" Clarkson recalls Allen saying to them. Then he introduced them to Allen's old coach, the man who created the game: James Naismith.

=== College years ===
Clarkson continued his photography through his adolescence to the Journalism school at his local college, University of Kansas. Through his college career, he was able to follow coach Phog Allen and his team on many road trips for games. In addition, the late North Carolina coach Dean Smith was a player on that same basketball team. The team enjoyed having Rich there to document their story and Rich would often room with the 12th player on the team, Dean Smith.

Rich later documented The University of Kansas toward their 1952 National Championship where Kansas defeated St. John's 80-63 for the title. In 1956, Clarkson graduated from the School of Journalism at KU. When Wilt Chamberlain arrived in Lawrence to begin his collegiate basketball career, Rich had just graduated from the University of Kansas and was putting together the start of his photojournalistic career. It was at this time the most prestigious of sports publications had just arrived on the scene: Sports Illustrated. He took the occasion when preseason picture day arrived to photograph the 7-foot Wilt from every angle—jumping, dunking, rebounding and just standing under the basket. This was to be his first introduction to SI.

But as he was finishing photographing Wilt, it seemed that nothing Clarkson was doing made him look as tall and imposing as he was in real life. His last-minute idea was to pose him seated, tying his shoes. Wilt's waist was unusually high and his legs very long. When he sat in the folding chair Rich brought onto the court, he finally made him look tall in a picture. He then packaged up a set of prints and dropped them into the mail to Sports Illustrated. As luck would have it, his package arrived on the desk of picture editor Jerry Astor on the very morning that managing editor Andre Laguerre had decided to do a Chamberlain story. Instead of sending a photographer from New York to Lawrence, they used his picture.

Three months later, Astor called to give Rich his first big-time magazine assignment to photograph the Kansas-Iowa State game in Lawrence for Sports Illustrated.

=== Days at The Topeka Capital-Journal ===
After graduation, he served as an information services officer in the Air Force for two years before becoming director of photography of the Topeka Capital-Journal, a position he held for 21 years during which time the newspaper became a recognized national leader in use of photography. Eleven members of that newspaper staff were then or eventually honored as Newspaper of Magazine Photographers of the Year for the nation. And through all this, Clarkson remained a contract photographer for Sports Illustrated magazine covering regional and national games.

Just a few of the most notable photographers he mentored during his time at Topeka are the following:

- Chris Johns, chief content officer for National Geographic Society
- Brian Lanker, Pulitzer Prize winner and Life photographer
- David Alan Harvey, Magnum Photos member and National Geographic photographer
- Jim Richardson, National Geographic photographer
- Susan Biddle, White House photographer and staff photographer at The Washington Post
- Susan Ford, American author and daughter of former U.S. President Gerald Ford

=== Publishing ===
He has been a contributor to numerous publications on photojournalism and sports and has co-authored six books including “The Jim Ryun Story” with Cordner Nelson in 1967, “Sooner” with Bill Bruns in 1972, “Knight With the Hoosiers” with Bob Hammel in 1975, “Montreal ‘76” with Bill Bruns in 1976, “The Final Four” with Billy Reed in 1988 and “Silver Knight” with Bob Hammel in 1996. He produced an entirely new version of the book, The Final Four” with the 60th anniversary of the tournament in 2001. He was the compiling editor of “The Kansas Century: 100 Years of Jayhawk Basketball” in 1997 and “World Champion Broncos” in 1998. He was director of photography for the book, “A Day in the Life of America” in 1986 and was a photographer on four other “Day in the Life” books. He produced the 25th anniversary commemorative book for the Castle Pines Golf Club in Colorado in 2005.

In 1989, he was producer-coordinator for the Brian Lanker project, “ I Dream A World: Portraits of Black Women who Changed America,” which included both a book, now in its 15th printing, and two traveling exhibitions. It became the second best-selling picture book ever in America. Portfolios of pictures were reprinted in the National Geographic, U. S. News & World Report and LIFE magazines in addition to major display in many American newspapers.

Clarkson Creative have produced 23 other hardback books ranging in subject from “Notre Dame Football Today” to “Small Town America.” Clarkson was a principal designer and curator for the NCAA Hall of Champions, a 12,000-square foot museum of college sports memorabilia and pictures in the NCAA headquarters building formerly in suburban Kansas City.

== Career timeline ==
- 1958-79: Director of Photography, "The Topeka Capital-Journal"
- 1975-76: President, "National Press Photographers Association"
- Contract Photographer, Sports Illustrated, with over 30 cover photographs
- 1980-84: Assistant Managing Editor/Graphics, "The Denver Post"
- 1984-87: former Director of Photography, National Geographic magazine
- 1987–Present: President & Founder, Clarkson Creative

== Awards ==
- 2015: Inductee into the Denver Press Club Hall of Fame
