= Si Burick =

American sports journalist (1909–1986)

Si Burick

Simon "Si" Burick (June 14, 1909 – December 10, 1986) was a sports editor and featured columnist for the Dayton Daily News for 58 years.

== Biography ==
Burick was an Ohio radio personality as early as 1935, when he became WHIO's first sportscaster. His daily 15-minute programs aired until 1961. Burick also hosted the Cincinnati Reds pre-game show before home games. In 1949, when WHIO-TV went on the air, Burick was one of its featured personalities and continued to be so for 10 years.

Burick authored three books, Alston and the Dodgers in 1966, The Main Spark, a biography of Sparky Anderson, in 1978, and Byline, a collection of his columns, in 1982.

=== Honors ===
Burick was voted the J. G. Taylor Spink Award by the Baseball Writers' Association of America (BBWAA) in late 1982, and in July 1983 was honored at ceremonies at the National Baseball Hall of Fame in Cooperstown, New York. He became the first writer from a city without a Major League Baseball team to be so honored at the Hall of Fame.

Burick was inducted into the National Sportscasters and Sportswriters Association Hall of Fame in 1985. In 1986, he received the Red Smith Award from the Associated Press Sports Editors (APSE), given annually to a single honoree for "major contributions to sports journalism".
