= Dave Kindred =

American sportswriter

Dave Kindred (born April 12, 1941) is an American sportswriter.

== Early life and education ==
Kindred was born on April 12, 1941, in Atlanta, Illinois, USA. When he was a teenager his mother bought him a typewriter for his birthday and he wrote about Stan Musial. At around the same age, he aspired to become a sportswriter like Red Smith and would pick up his columns from the train station every Sunday morning.

Kindred attended Atlanta High School where he played on their basketball team, leading them to the 1959 regional championship. He continued his aspirations to become a sportswriter although he was discouraged by his English teacher who said, "Maybe one day you can grow up and be a foreign correspondent." After graduating, Kindred attended Illinois Wesleyan University on a journalism scholarship and competed on their Division III baseball team. While in school and for two years after, he worked full-time on the sports section of The Pantagraph. He found his time at the paper challenging for he was in charge of covering all basketball games across the city and keeping track of scores.

== Career ==
Kindred left The Pantagraph in 1965 to become a staff writer and columnist for The Courier-Journal. During his tenure at the paper, he followed Muhammad Ali and eventually published a condensed dual biography of Howard Cosell and Ali in 2006. In his first year at the Courier-Journal, while working at the copy desk, he was informed that Ali was in town and told to find him. Upon finding him, Kindred and Ali drove around Louisville to his neighborhood and hometown hangouts for the day. As they became more familiar with one another, Ali nicknamed Kindred "Louisville" for he was his hometown guy. Kindred estimates that he interviewed Ali around 300 times across numerous locations including Madison Square Garden and his various homes. Along with covering Ali, Kindred also reported on the 1972 Summer Olympics, and the subsequent Munich massacre, and the 1976 Summer Olympics. As a result of his journalism work, he received a 1971 general interest National Headline Award and numerous "Sportswriter of the Year" awards.

Kindred eventually left to join The Washington Post in the summer of 1977 as their new sports columnist. Speaking of his time there he said, "I wrote four or five times per week from everywhere in the world on every major sporting event, every time trying to make the column the best one I ever wrote." His first column for the Post was on George Allen as coach of the Washington Redskins. Kindred stayed at the Washington Post until 1984 before writing for The Atlanta Journal-Constitution and The National Sports Daily. In his first year with the Sports Daily, Kindred received the Red Smith Award for outstanding contributions to sports journalism. He continued to write for the National Sports Daily and Golf Digest from the 1990s through the turn of the 21st century.

Kindred was inducted into the U.S. Basketball Writers Hall of Fame and National Sportscasters and Sportswriters Association Hall of Fame. In 2000, he was recognized by the Basketball Hall of Fame with the Curt Gowdy Print Media Award. Eleven years later, he was named the recipient of the Dick Schaap Award for Outstanding Journalism and received the 2010 PGA Lifetime Achievement Award in Journalism. In 2019, Kindred donated his sports journalism collection of over 50 years to his alma maters Tate Archives and Special Collections.

He is the author of many books, most recently Leave Out the Tragic Parts, published in 2021, about the death of his grandson Jared, and My Home Team, published in 2023, about returning to his home-town after retirement and finding connection and community in covering the girls' high school basketball team, the Lady Potters of Morton, Illinois.

== Personal life ==
Kindred met his wife Cheryl Liesman while attending Atlanta High School and they have one son together. She died in 2021.
