= Joumana Kidd =

American journalist

- Born: Joumana Marie Samaha; Foster City, California, U.S.
- Occupations: Actress, journalist
- Years active: 1994–2015
- Spouse: Jason Kidd (m. 1997; div. 2007)
- Children: 3

Joumana Marie Kidd (née Samaha) is a former actress and journalist, and former wife of former NBA basketball player and Dallas Mavericks head coach Jason Kidd.

== Early life and career ==
Born and raised in Foster City, California, she attended school obtaining a BS Degree in Communications from San Francisco State University until marrying Jason Kidd shortly after graduation and moving initially to Phoenix, Arizona then to Saddle River, New Jersey.

She initially was a stay-at-home mother to their newborn son T.J. (Trey Jason) but after a break into hosting for NBA television, decided to pursue a career in TV hosting, working briefly for the entertainment television show Extra, and went on to cover the Grammys and Rock 'n' Roll Hall of Fame ceremonies. She was a cast member of the 2010 VH1 Reality Series Let's Talk About Pep, appeared as a guest commentator on three episodes (2013–2014) of Bethenny, and in 2013 made a pilot episode for own potential series called Women on Women (WOW). Her last work was a 2015 pilot episode for a potential talk show called The Journey with Joumanna Kidd.

== Personal life ==
Jason and Joumana were married in 1997 and have three children Trey Jason (T.J.), and twins Miah and Jazelle.

In January 2001, Jason Kidd was arrested and pleaded guilty to a domestic abuse charge for assaulting his wife Joumana in anger. As part of his plea, Kidd was ordered to attend anger management classes for six months. Kidd completed the mandatory counseling and continued to attend on his own and it was reported that Kidd has since given up alcohol. He and his wife were both active in their church and were thought to have completely reconciled. On January 9, 2007, Jason Kidd filed for divorce against his wife, citing "extreme cruelty" during their relationship. Kidd contended intense jealousy, paranoia, and the threat of "false domestic abuse claims" to the police as reasons for the divorce. On February 15, 2007, Joumana Kidd filed a counterclaim for divorce, claiming that the NBA star—among countless instances of abuse—"broke her rib and damaged her hearing by smashing her head into the console of a car".
