= Leigh Montville =

American writer

Leigh Montville (born July 20, 1943) is an American writer and former newspaper columnist who worked for The Boston Globe and Sports Illustrated.

== Early life and education ==
Montville was born in New Haven, Connecticut. He graduated from the University of Connecticut.

== Career ==
Montville was a longtime print journalist as a columnist for The Boston Globe as a senior writer with Sports Illustrated. He spent 21 years at the Globe, many of them with Peter Gammons, Bob Ryan, and Will McDonough.

He has authored many books, including best-sellers such as The Big Bam, a biography of New York Yankees baseball legend Babe Ruth, and Ted Williams: The Biography of an American Hero, about the Hall of Fame left fielder for the Red Sox, which won the 2004 CASEY Award for best baseball book of the year. He also wrote At the Altar of Speed: The Fast Life and Tragic Death of Dale Earnhardt, and Manute: The Center of Two Worlds, about former 7'7" NBA center Manute Bol.

He wrote the book Why Not Us? following the 2004 World Series won by the Red Sox after 86 years of fan suffering. Montville recounts the stories of long-suffering fans, including himself, and includes a large section from the Red Sox web site Sons of Sam Horn where fans posted their own stories.

Montville co-authored the book Dare to Dream: Connecticut Basketball's Remarkable March to the National Championship with UConn head coach Jim Calhoun. Calhoun, along with Montville, a UConn graduate, recounts his humble beginnings at Northeastern University through his move to the University of Connecticut and finally the men's program's first title in 1999.

In the 1990s, Montville provided commentary for the short-lived cable network CNN/SI. He was featured in episodes of The Top 5 Reasons You Can't Blame..., Costas Now, American Masters, and the HBO Sports documentary The Curse of the Bambino.

His 2008 book The Mysterious Montague: A True Tale of Hollywood, Golf and Armed Robbery told the true story of John Montague, a 1930s California-based amateur called "the greatest golfer in the world" by Grantland Rice, who later turned out to be a fugitive wanted for armed robbery in New York state.

Most recently, Montville wrote Sting Like a Bee: Muhammed Ali vs. the United States of America, 1966-1971 which focuses on the cultural and political implications of Ali's refusal of service in the military and Tall Men, Short Shorts: The 1969 NBA Finals: Wilt, Russ, Lakers, Celtics, and a Very Young Sports Reporter (2021).
