= National Sports Journalism Center =

Education program at Indiana University Bloomington

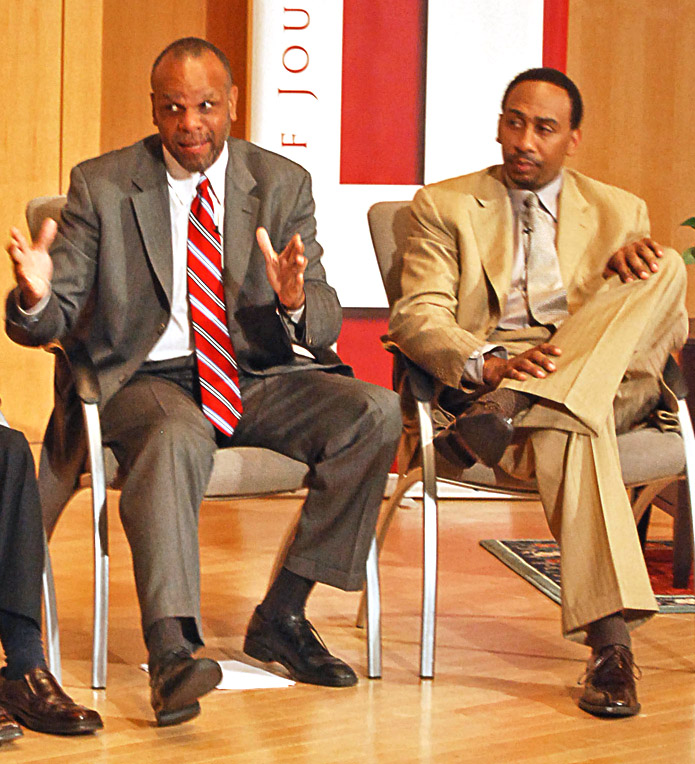
- New York Times columnist William C. Rhoden (left) and former ESPN contributor Stephen A. Smith discuss diversity in the newsroom at a NSJC event in Indianapolis on 09/14/09.
- Type: Journalism program
- Owner: Indiana University
- Founded: 2009
- Headquarters: 601 E. Kirkwood Avenue; Bloomington, IN 47405; United States; Phone: (812) 855-3367
- Website: National Sports Journalism Center

The National Sports Journalism Center is a sports journalism program run by Indiana University and a resource center for sports media professionals. The center, based at Indiana University-Bloomington, is partnered with the Media School at Indiana University, through which students can take degree programs in sports journalism and other forms of sports media.

The center, founded in early 2009, has hosted events on the Bloomington and Indianapolis campuses. It held its first event, a forum on the effects of hype and evolving media pressures on sports reporting, in March 2009. It held a second panel discussion on diversity in the sports media industry in September 2009. Additional speakers have included Fox sports commentator Joe Buck and Pulitzer Prize winner and Friday Night Lights author H.G. Bissinger.

== See also ==
- Sport communication
