= Dick Weiss =

American glass artist

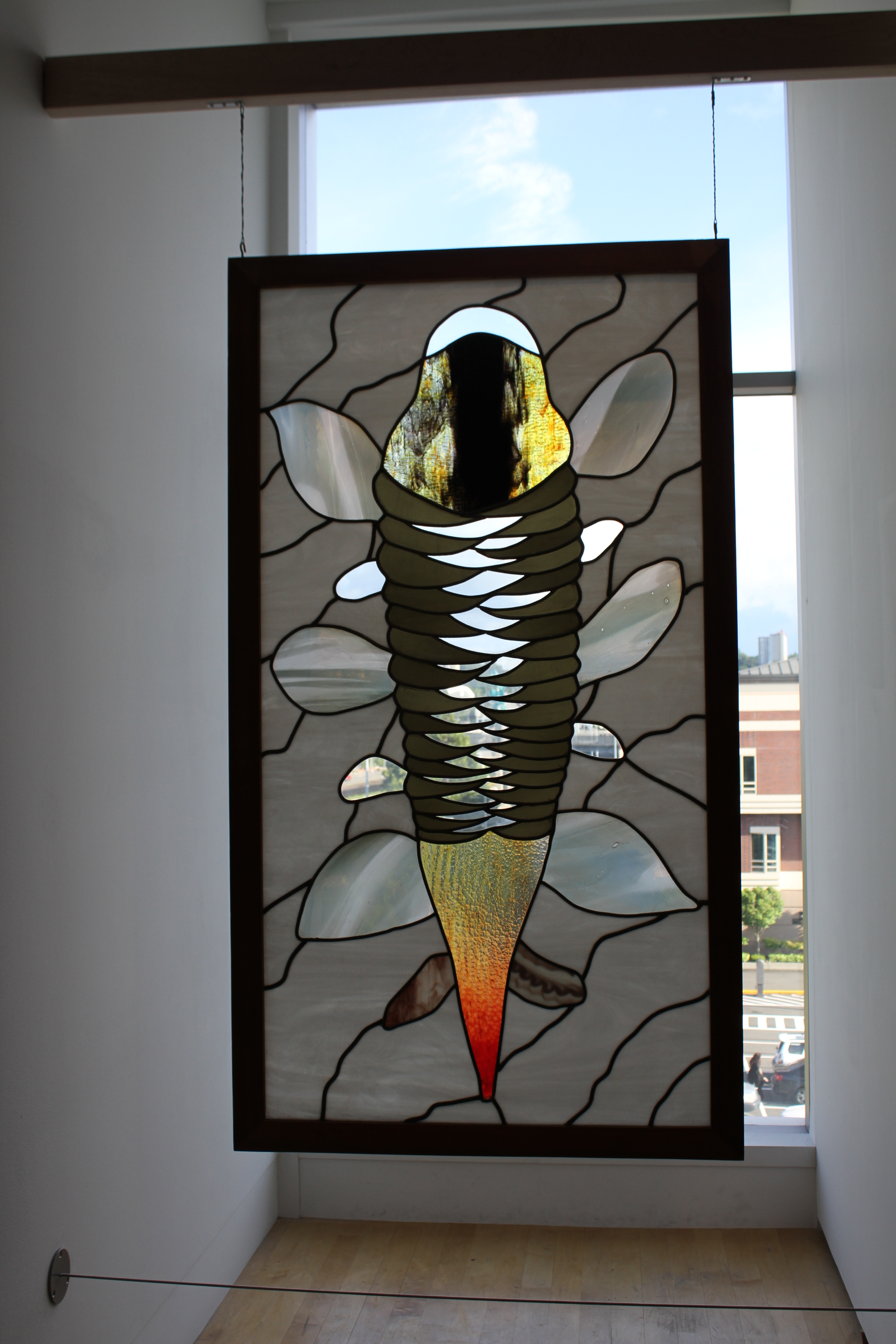
Dick Weiss window from The Paul Marioni Collection at The Tacoma Art Museum

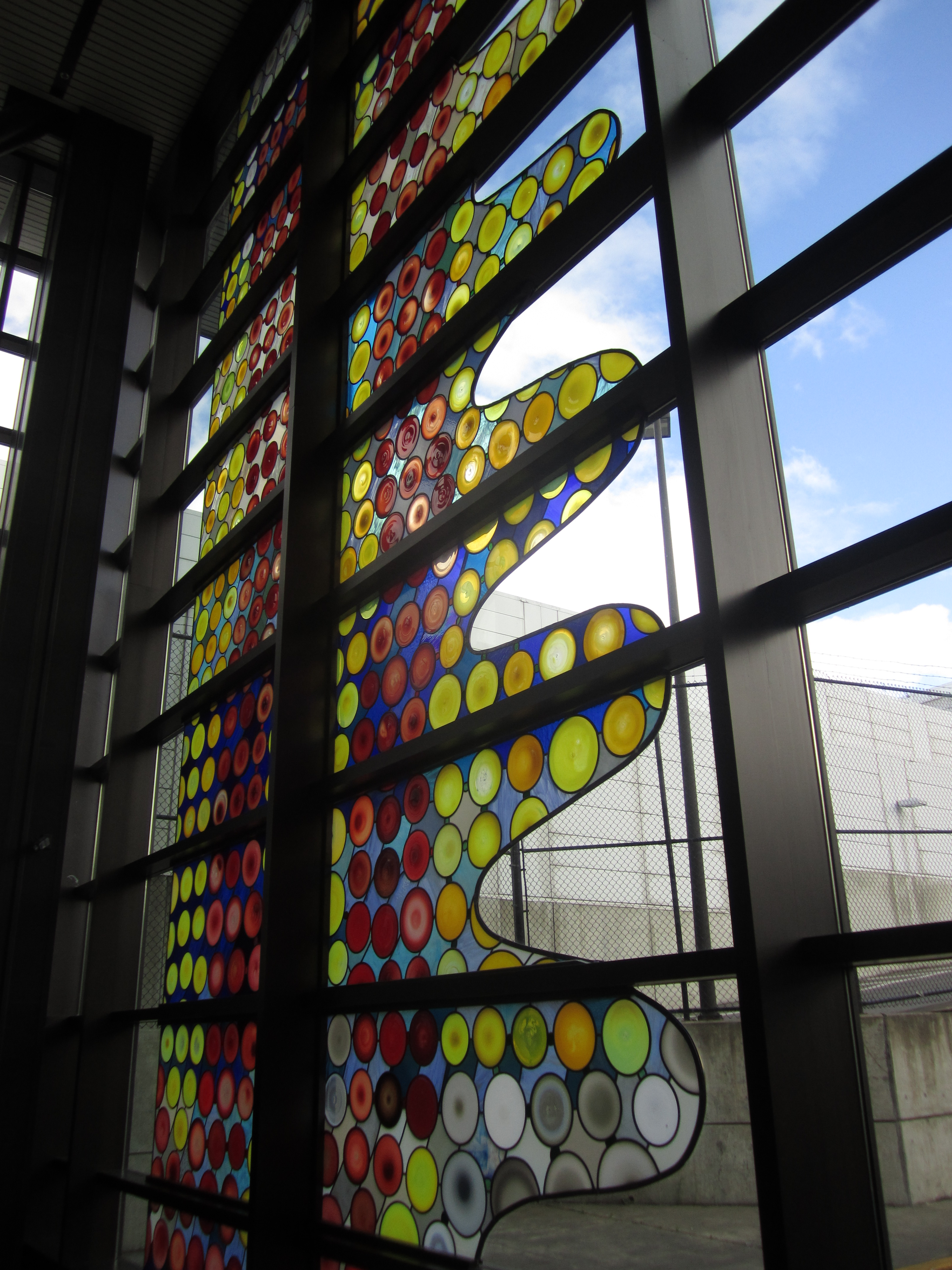
"Cow on its side by Dick Weiss at Seatac Airport

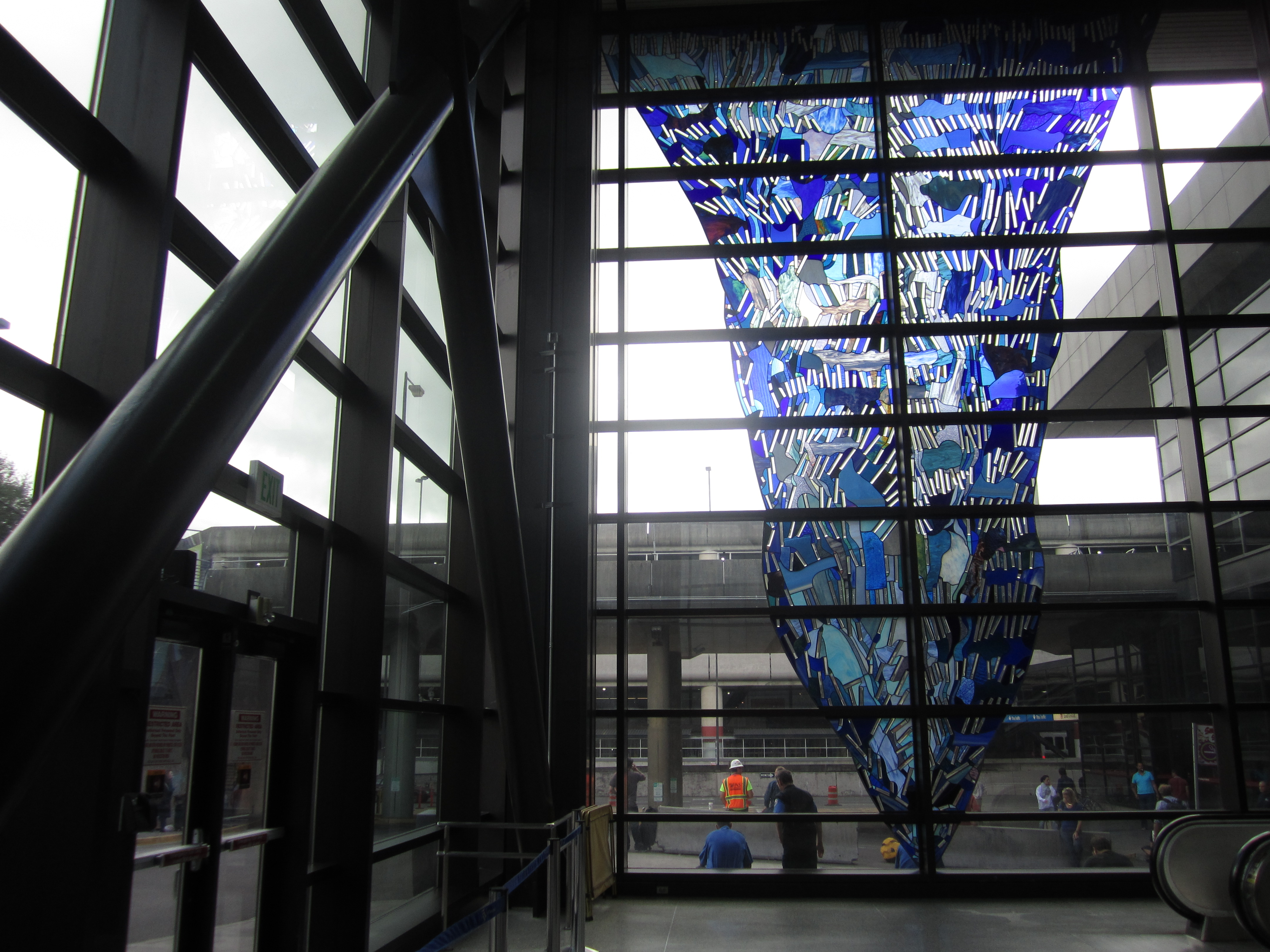
"For AW" by Dick Weiss at Seatac Airport

Richard Weiss (born 1946 in Everett, Washington) is an American glass artist.

He is part of the American Studio Glass Movement. He earned his Bachelor of Arts in psychology from Yale University, New Haven, Connecticut. He is a teacher at Pilchuck Glass School and is primarily known for his large installations such as the work at The Seattle/Tacoma Airport and his collaborations with Walter Lieberman with the name of WD40+.

== Permanent collections and commissions ==
- City of Everett, Everett, WA
- City of Seattle, Seattle, WA
- Corning Museum of Glass, Corning, NY
- Glasmuseum Frauenau, Germany
- Pilchuck Glass School, Pilchuck, WA
- Museum of Glass, Tacoma, WA
- Victoria and Albert Museum, London, England
- Chapel, Fred Hutchinson Cancer Research Center, Seattle, WA
- Edmonds Woodway High School, Edmonds, WA
- General Dynamics Corp., Falls Church, VA (With Sonja Blomdahl)
- Kenai Community College, Homer, AK
- Kent Senior Citizen’s Center, Kent, WA
- Kentwood High School, Kent, WA
- M’Connell Foundation, Redding, CA
- North Central High School, Spokane, WA
- Opera House, Seattle, WA
- Port of Shanghai, China
- Seattle-Tacoma International Airport, Seattle, WA
- Sitka Lutheran Church, Sitka, AK
- University of Washington, Seattle, WA
