= Amelia Park Ice Rink and Memorial Garden =

Ice rink in Massachusetts, United States

Coordinates: 42°6′45.4″N 72°44′54.6″W

Amelia Park Arena
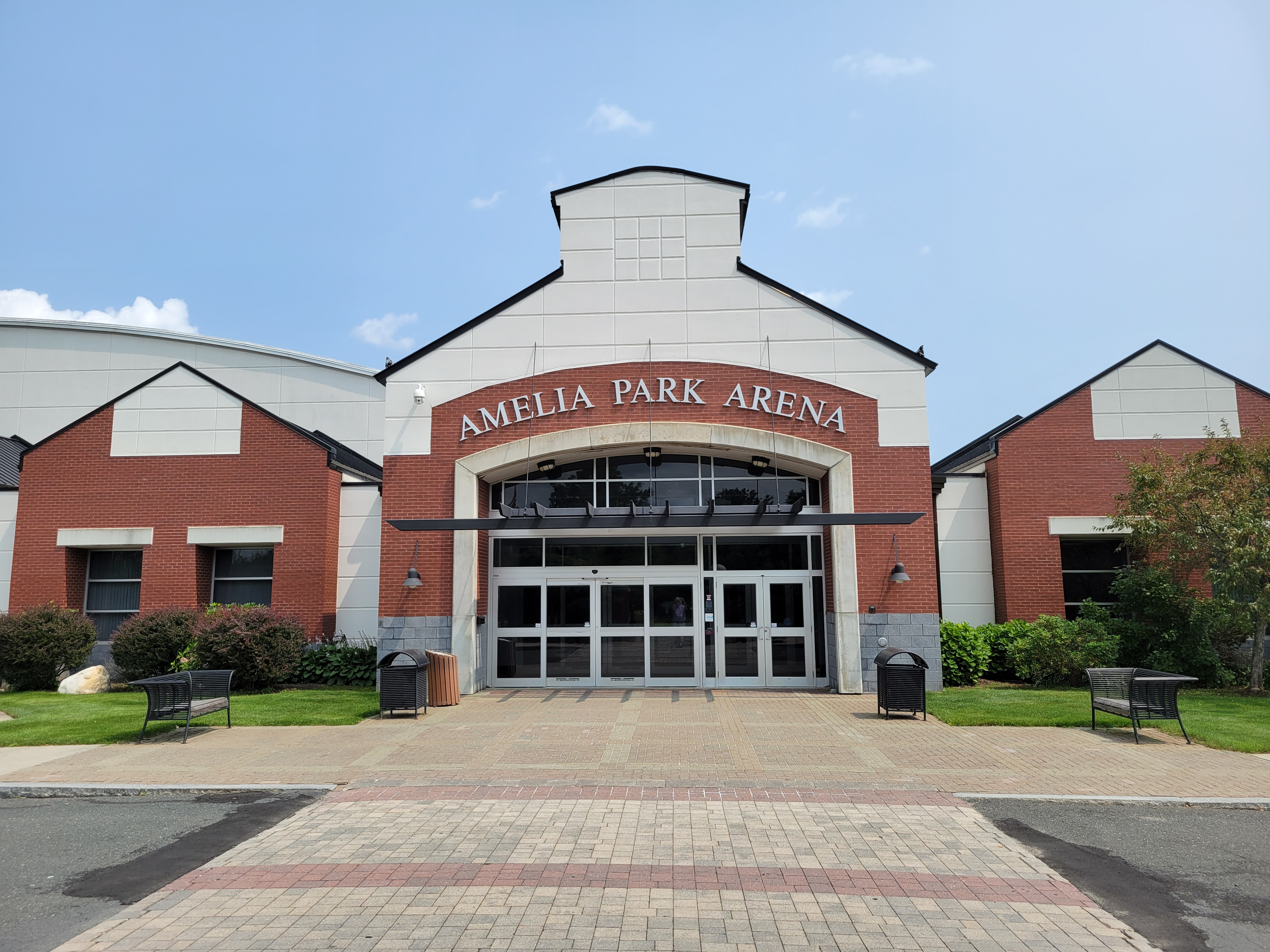
- Amelia Park Arena
- Company type: Non-Profit Ice rink and memorial garden
- Founder: Albert Ferst
- Headquarters: 21 South Broad Street, Westfield, Massachusetts 01085
- Key people: General Manager: Bruce Landon Assistant General Manager: Christina Pagella
- Website: www.AmeliaParkArena.org

The Amelia Park facilities are located in Westfield, Massachusetts, United States. The Amelia Park Ice Rink is the only ice rink in Westfield. The main building is a 47,000-square-foot (4,400 m^{2}) facility, a figure skating lounge, three party rooms, a skate rental and sharpening area, four locker rooms and a food concession area. A 65' x 170' outside inline skating rink is located next to the main building. The $6 million facility was created by Albert Ferst in memory of his late wife, Amelia. The facility houses activities and events, such as open skating times, hockey games for Westfield State University, St. Mary's High School, Westfield High School, and Sled Hockey Games. Gardens span 3.1 acres (13,000 m^{2}) and are located across from the main entrance of the arena.

== History ==
Albert and Amelia Ferst, residents of Westfield, MA, were involved community members. They bought Camfour Inc., a fishing equipment, Chris-Craft boat distributorship, and police firearms sales company, in 1952 from Adam Cameron and Bill Fournier. Ferst owned the company until 1998 when he sold it to the Picknelly family. With the millions earned in revenue from the business, the Ferst's helped fund The Albert and Amelia Ferst Interfaith Center at Westfield State University, and renovated the Westfield Boy's and Girl's Club.

Amelia, nicknamed Millie by her husband, had a dream to build an ice rink for the children of the community. After Amelia died, Albert spent six million dollars to create an ice rink in her honor. He also created a garden in her memory, which is outside the ice rink. There is a children's museum around the corner from the arena, to which Ferst donated one million dollars. A portrait of the couple is seen when visitors walk in the main door of the arena.

== Facility ==
=== Ice Rink ===
The Amelia Park Ice Rink is an NHL standard sized arena with seating for 600 fans. In the main building, along with the ice rink, the facility contains a pro shop, four locker rooms, and areas for food concession. The Westfield State University hockey teams use the ice rink for practice sessions and home games. The school runs shuttles to and from the university so that fans are able to attend the games. Westfield high schools also use the facilities for their hockey games as do many adult leagues and independent teams. There is an inline skating rink outdoors where many leagues and teams play deck hockey. The ice arena offers an open skate to the public several days a week along with skating classes for all ages. Hockey lessons and camps are available.

=== Memorial Garden ===
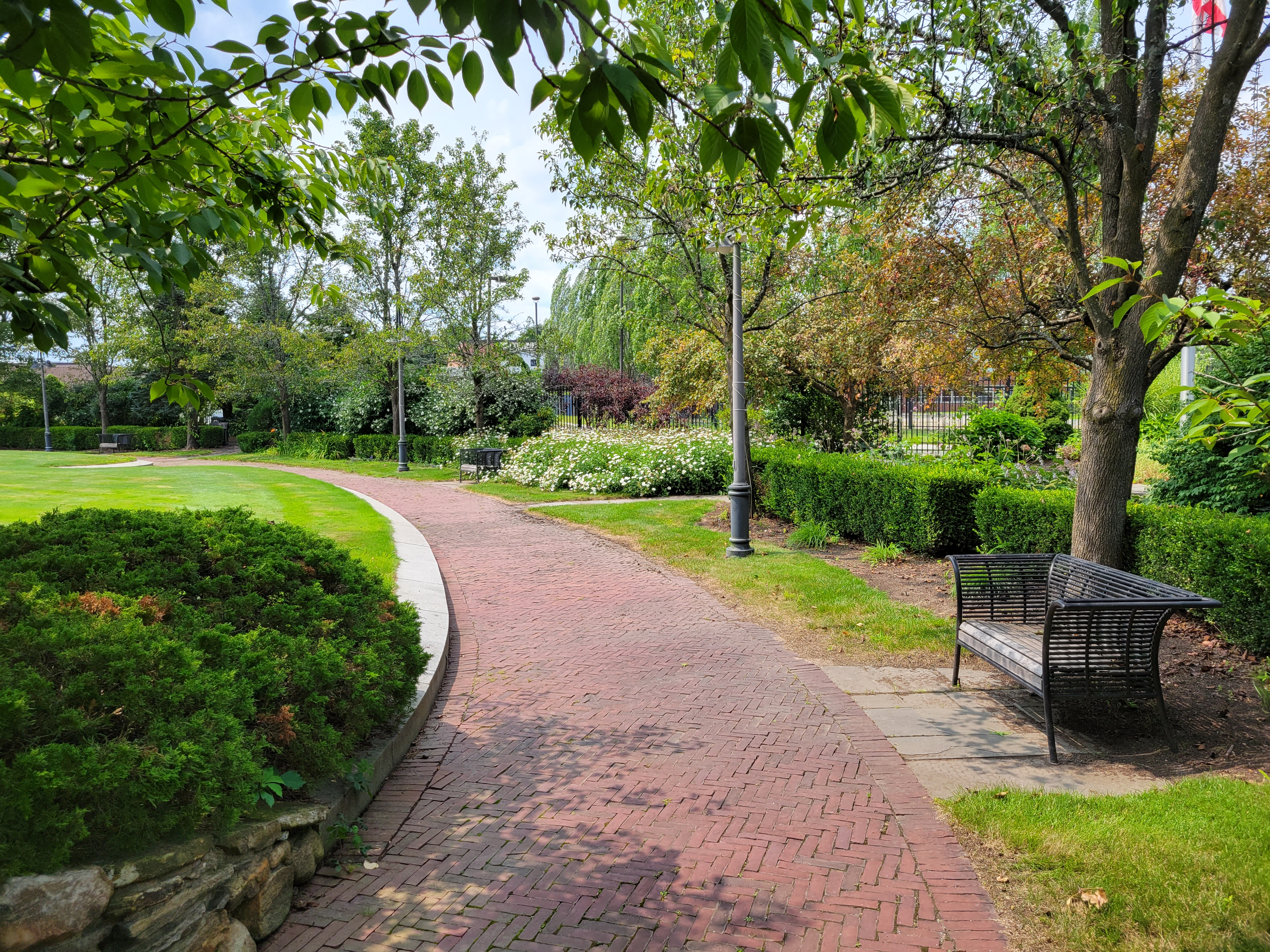
Memorial Garden

Amelia's Garden spans over an acre and contains a wide variety of plant species. It boasts a fountain, gazebo and waterfall. The garden hosts public events, the most popular of which are the concerts on Tuesday nights in the summer. The area can be rented for weddings, photographs, and social functions. During the winter, the gardens are decorated in Christmas lights, and there is an area designated for Santa's house where families can visit Mr. and Mrs. Claus.

=== Children's Museum ===
The Amelia Park Children's Museum is located at 29 South Broad Street in Westfield, Massachusetts. The museum offers membership opportunities for its patrons, that include free admission for one year and discounts on parties. Events and exhibits in the museum occur seasonally and there are playgroups for all ages.

The museum hosts themed birthday parties along with field trips for schools in the area. There are conference rooms that are available for rent. The Amelia Park Museum and Arena offer community service and work study jobs for students attending area schools.

The museum is undergoing construction and visitors have the opportunity to buy a brick with a personal message that will become a part of the new entrance to the building.
