= Alice Burke =

Alice Burke may refer to:

- Alice Burke (politician) (1892–1974), American politician who was the mayor of Westfield, Massachusetts
- Alice Burke (footballer) (born 2002), Australian rules footballer
