= Marc Hungerbuhler =

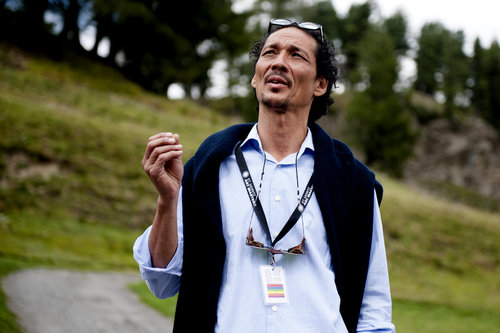
- Marc Hungerbuhler at St.Moritz Art Masters 2011
- Born: 1 October 1963 (age 63); St.Gallen, Switzerland
- Occupation: Artist / Curator
- Known for: The:Artist:network Arts Organization
- Spouse: Alexandra Hungerbuhler
- Children: Sebastiao & Noel Hungerbuhler

Marc Anton Kyu Hungerbühler (born 1963) is a New York City―based multimedia artist and curator. He was born in Switzerland to a Swiss father and a Korean mother. He has one sister, Cosima Hungerbühler. He received his Bachelor of Fine Arts from the Parsons School of Design in 1985, and went on to a summer residency at the Skowhegan School of Painting and Sculpture. He has exhibited his works in Korea, Japan, China, the United States, and Europe. In 2002, he founded the:artist:network, an independent arts organization based in downtown Manhattan and Beijing, for which he serves as director. For the:artist:network, he has organized and curated more than 40 international exhibitions and established residency programs in New York, Switzerland, and China.

Marc Hungerbühler has served as a cultural correspondent for various Swiss media in New York since 1993. In 1998, he was granted permanent residency in the United States as a foreign professional with extraordinary ability in the arts. He has initiated numerous art-exchange projects, in particular between the United States, Europe, and Asia. Presently, he is curatorial director for the first 798 Beijing Biennale 2009.

He has been married to Alexandra Hungerbühler since 1995, and they have two children, Noelle and Sebastiao. His sister has a son called Daniel Vicente.

== Selected curatorial projects ==
- CRITICAL MASS, Huang Yan Contemporary Art Center, Beijing, China, 2008
- Power-Shape, Bridge Art Center, Beijing, China, 2008
- SURGE, 798 Art Festival, Beijing, China, 2007
