= William A. Johnson =

William A. Johnson may refer to:

- William A. Johnson Jr. (born 1942), mayor of Rochester, New York
- William A. Johnson (Wisconsin politician)
- William Andrew Johnson (1858–1943), Tennessee pastry chef once enslaved by U.S. president Andrew Johnson
- William Allen Johnson, American organ builder
- William Arthur Johnson (biologist) (1816–1880), amateur biologist and clergyman in Canada
- William Arthur Johnson (biochemist) (1913–?), British biochemist

== See also ==
- William Agnew Johnston, Kansas politician and judge
- William Johnson (disambiguation)
