= Ray Fitzgerald =

Ray Fitzgerald may refer to:

- Ray Fitzgerald (baseball) (1904–1977), American baseball player
- Ray Fitzgerald (journalist) (1927–1982), American sports journalist
- Ray Fitzgerald (politician) (1897–1963), Australian politician
- Ray Fitzgerald (poet), American cowboy poet
