= Ray Fitzgerald (journalist) =

American sports journalist

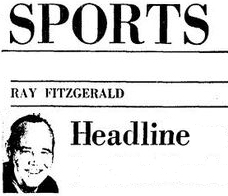
- Born: Westfield, Massachusetts, US
- Died: August 3, 1982; Boston, Massachusetts, US
- Occupation: Sports journalist
- Employer: The Boston Globe
- Awards: 12 time National Sports Media Association Massachusetts Sportswriter of the Year

Ray Fitzgerald (1927 – August 3, 1982) was an American sports journalist. One of the first modern sports commentators, Fitzgerald gained his widest readership at The Boston Globe between 1965 and 1982. He won 12 Massachusetts Sportswriter of the Year awards (11 times at the Globe) from the National Sports Media Association in his career.

== Early life ==
Fitzgerald was born in Westfield, Massachusetts in 1927 the eldest of four children and namesake to his father, a realtor. A 1944 graduate of Westfield High School he was a star in baseball, basketball, and football.

Fitzgerald attended the University of Notre Dame on a baseball scholarship, graduating in 1949. He began his newspaper career that year at The Schenectady Union-Star while he continued his baseball career in semi-professional leagues. He later worked for The Springfield (Mass) Union for 12 years where he won his first Massachusetts Sportswriter of the Year award before being hired by the Globe in 1965.

== Career ==
His most famous column still hangs in the Fenway Park press box, a paean to the Red Sox win in Game 6 of the 1975 World Series against the "Big Red Machine". It's a later draft of what he had already written as the Red Sox trailed in the 8th inning before Bernie Carbo of the Red Sox tied the game with a pinch hit home run. NSMA Hall of Fame Sportscaster Leslie Visser, then a young reporter covering high school sports at the Globe, happened to be sitting behind Fitzgerald in the Fenway press box that night, and as soon as Carbo homered and Fitzgerald ripped the half-finished column out of his typewriter so he could load a blank sheet, she reached down to rescue the early draft from the floor, something she has kept to this day. His never-to be-seen lede: "You could feel it slipping away...."

Instead the column that ran the next morning wondered: "How can there be a topper for what went on last night and early this morning in a ballyard gone mad, madder and maddest while watching well, the most exciting game of baseball I've ever seen." It speaks to the colorful heritage of the Red Sox that the press box celebrates a story about a series the team famously lost. His column was read into the Congressional Record by Massachusetts Senator Ed Brooke.

Fitzgerald had many fans beyond his fellow columnists, among them John Updike whom he escorted through the process of writing a column on the Red Sox Opening Day in 1979. Updike's story "First Kiss" was published on the front page of the Globe next day.

Besides Tom Fitzgerald, Ray Fitzgerald worked with other notable Globe sportswriters Bud Collins, Will McDonough, Bob Ryan, Peter Gammons, Leigh Montville, and Dan Shaughnessy. Jackie MacMullan was hired at the Globe sports section shortly after Fitzgerald's death in 1982.

His death in 1982 aged 55 was widely lamented by his peers and colleagues. His Globe colleague Dan Shaughnessy called him "the best sports columnist to grace these sports pages in my lifetime." New York Times sports writer George Vecsey said: "sports columnists also need a sense of humor and personal perception. Ray Fitzgerald had them all." Bill Simmons has said, "Ray Fitzgerald was my first favorite sports columnist... he was amazing."

== Work ==
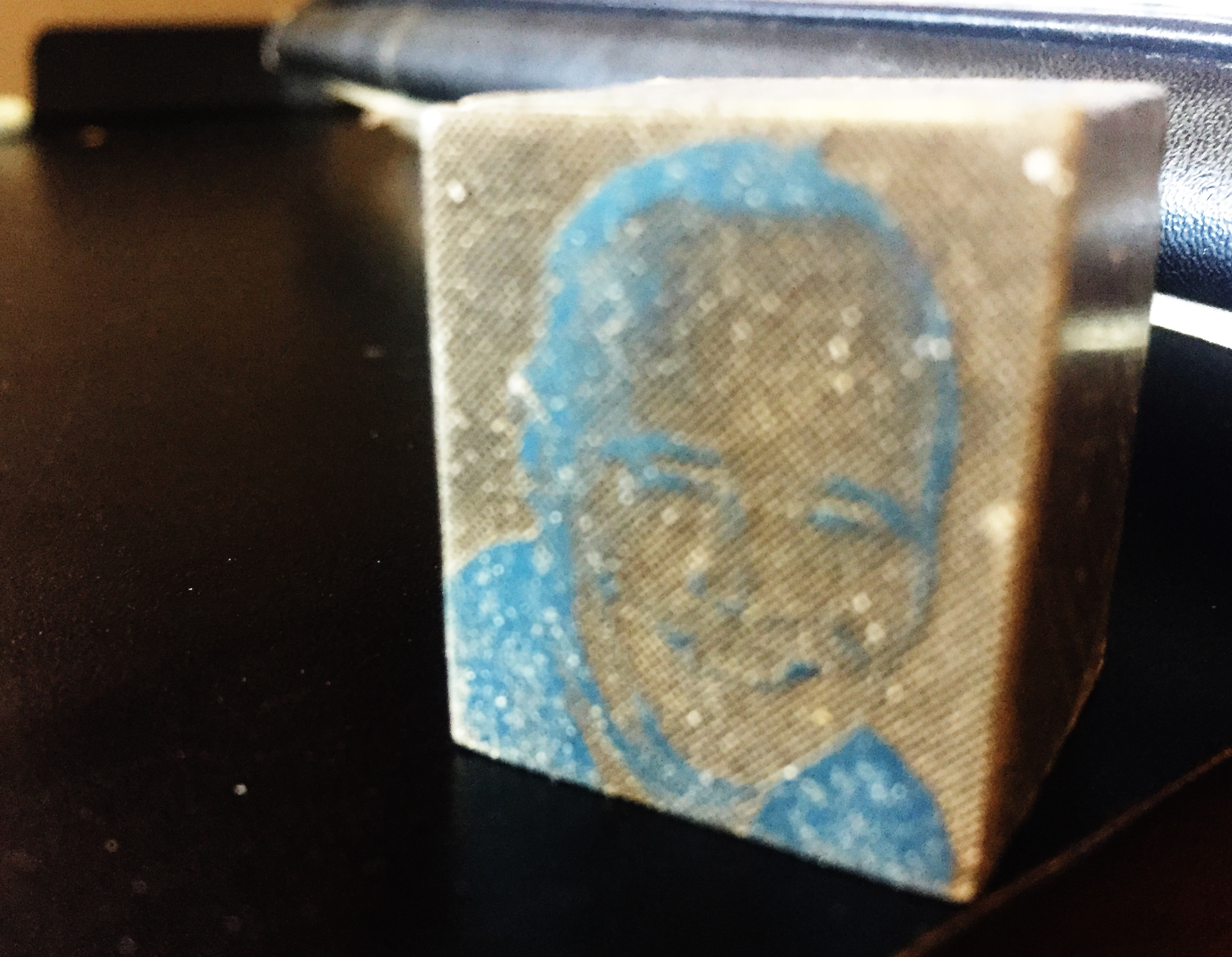
Printers block of the Ray Fitzgerald column mug shot in the Boston Globe circa 1974 (courtesy of Dan Shaughnessy)

Fitzgerald used a wry and observant sense of humor in his columns. Excerpts from a column he wrote when the recently retired Tom Fitzgerald was given the 1978 Lester Patrick Trophy for outstanding service to hockey in the USA show his wit:

Tom Fitzgerald and I are not brothers. We look nothing alike. I'm considered a combination of John Wayne, Sylvester Stallone and Paul Newman, whereas Tom is... well... pretty much your average, forgettable type... I bring up the brother business merely to forestall the occasional cynic who might say I wrote this piece simply because I'm related to the subject. True, I call him Uncle Tom, but only out of respect, as Amy Carter would call Hamilton Jordan Uncle Ham... His story-telling talent made Fitzgerald a frequent between-periods radio and television guest, and he reportedly holds the Guinness record for the accumulation of complimentary raincoats, Panasonic radios and Cross pens.

— Ray Fitzgerald, "That Other Fitzgerald"

Shaughnessy's 2020 column in the Globe offered many more examples of Fitzgerald's prose. Many of the best columns are collected in the book Touching All Bases: The Collected Ray Fitzgerald 1970-1982 published posthumously by Stephen Green Press.

== Bibliography ==
- Touching All Bases: The Collected Ray Fitzgerald 1970-1982; ISBN 9780828905077
- Champions Remembered; ISBN 9780828905176
