= Chase Hall =

American artist (born 1993)

- Born: 1993 (age 32–33); Saint Paul, Minnesota, U.S.
- Known for: Painting, sculpture

Chase Hall (born 1993) is an American contemporary artist known for figurative paintings made with acrylic and brewed coffee on unprimed cotton canvas. His work draws on his biracial identity and examines Black life, American history, and the associations of coffee and cotton with race and labor. His first solo museum exhibition, The Close of Day, was held at the SCAD Museum of Art in 2023.

== Early life and career ==
Hall was born in Saint Paul, Minnesota, and moved frequently while growing up. As a teenager working at Starbucks, he began making small drawings with brewed coffee. He moved to New York City in 2013 intending to work as a photographer. He photographed people on the street and later taught himself about painting through museum visits, college reading lists, and discarded art materials.

Hall attended the Skowhegan School of Painting and Sculpture residency in 2019 and was an artist-in-residence at the Massachusetts Museum of Contemporary Art in 2020. In 2022, the Metropolitan Opera commissioned his large diptych Medea, Act I & II (Feuerbach & Van Loo) for a production of Medea. The Metropolitan Museum of Art acquired the work in 2024.

== Work ==
Hall's paintings are mostly portraits and scenes of people at work, at play, or outdoors. He uses brewed coffee to create a range of brown tones, while areas of exposed cotton canvas form the lighter parts of the image. Writing in Vogue, Dodie Kazanjian described this contrast as central to the way Hall addresses mixed-race identity. In The Atlantic, Thomas Chatterton Williams noted that many of Hall's figures are shown surfing, fishing, or otherwise acting outside narratives centered on tragedy.

The curator Jessica Bell Brown wrote in ART PAPERS that Hall's paintings, sculptures, and photographs use Black cultural artifacts and historical figures to question how Black life has been represented in white American culture. She also identified the unpainted areas of his canvases as part of that inquiry.

Hall's work is held in the permanent collections of the Studio Museum in Harlem, the Whitney Museum of American Art, the Walker Art Center, the High Museum of Art, and the Metropolitan Museum of Art.
