= Walt Kowalczyk =

American football player (1935–2018)

No. 43, 35
- Positions: Fullback, defensive back

Personal information
- Born: April 17, 1935; Westfield, Massachusetts, U.S.
- Died: November 7, 2018 (aged 83)
- Listed height: 6 ft 0 in (1.83 m)
- Listed weight: 208 lb (94 kg)

Career information
- High school: Westfield
- College: Michigan State (1954–1957)
- NFL draft: 1958: 1st round, 6th overall pick

Career history
- Philadelphia Eagles (1958–1959); Dallas Cowboys (1960); Oakland Raiders (1961)

Awards and highlights
- Consensus All-American (1957); First-team All-Big Ten (1957); Second-team All-Big Ten (1955)

Career NFL/AFL statistics
- Rushing yards: 264
- Rushing average: 2.6
- Receptions: 34
- Receiving yards: 256
- Total touchdowns: 3
- Stats at Pro Football Reference

Walter Joseph Kowalczyk (April 17, 1935 – November 7, 2018) was an American football defensive back and fullback in the National Football League (NFL) for the Philadelphia Eagles and the Dallas Cowboys. He also played in the American Football League (AFL) for the Oakland Raiders. He played college football at Michigan State University.

== Early life ==
Kowalczyk attended Westfield High School, where he earned four letters in football and baseball, three in basketball and two in track. In football and baseball he was named to the All-state team twice. He won the state 100-yard dash title twice. As a senior, he received the Harry Agganis Award as the best high school athlete in New England.

He accepted a scholarship from Michigan State University, where he became a three-year starter at right halfback. As a sophomore, he was given the nickname "The Sprinting Blacksmith", after his efforts helped his team defeat UCLA in the 1956 Rose Bowl. He recorded 584 yards and 6 touchdowns in the season.

As a junior, he was limited with a serious ankle sprain he suffered during fall practice and only registered 128 yards and 2 touchdowns.

In 1957, he posted 545 rushing yards (5.4 yards average), 9 touchdowns (led the Big Ten Conference) and 7 receptions for 128 yards. He placed third in the Heisman Trophy voting, the highest place ever by a Michigan State player. He finished his career with 1,257 rushing yards on 225 carries, 16 touchdowns, 10 receptions for 187 yards and one touchdown.

== Professional career ==
=== Philadelphia Eagles ===
Kowalczyk was selected in the first round (6th overall) of the 1958 NFL draft by the Philadelphia Eagles. He was a backup running back behind Clarence Peaks and Billy Ray Barnes. He also was a backup defensive back behind Tom Brookshier and Eddie Bell.

On July 24, 1960, he was traded to the Detroit Lions in exchange for Jerry Reichow.

=== Dallas Cowboys ===
Kowalczyk spent six weeks with the Detroit Lions in training camp, before his rights were sold to the Dallas Cowboys. Although he initially refused to report to the team, he changed his mind after commissioner Pete Rozelle threatened to fine him.

Although he was considered light for the position, he became the first starting fullback in franchise history (7 starts), while sharing playing time with Gene Babb (5 starts). He finished with 50 carries for 156 yards (third on the team) and 14 receptions for 143 yards (fifth on the team). He was waived in on September 12, 1961.

=== Oakland Raiders ===
On September 19, 1961, he was signed as a free agent by the Oakland Raiders of the American Football League. He retired after playing four games with them.

== Personal life ==
Kowalczyk became a teacher at Michigan State University. He was a member of The Pigskin Club of Washington, D.C. National Intercollegiate All-American Football Players Honor Roll.

He lived in the Rochester, Michigan, area, and spent his post-football years active in community activities (such as volunteering his time teaching Drivers Training classes). Kowalczyk died on November 7, 2018, at the age of 83.
