= Johnson Organs =

American pipe organ production firm

The William A. Johnson Organ Company of Westfield, Massachusetts, which later became Johnson & Son Organ Company, was a firm that built 860 pipe organs throughout the United States and in Canada and Bermuda. The company operated from 1844 through 1898. All Johnson organs were completely mechanical (tracker action) organs, with Barker lever tracker-pneumatic actions utilized in larger organs after 1871.

== History ==
In 1843, William Allen Johnson operated a contracting business in Westfield, Massachusetts. While he was completing the construction of a new church building for his own Westfield church, an organ builder of the firm E. and G. G. Hook & Hastings arrived with wagon loads of parts, pipes and materials which were to be installed in the new church. When asked about the availability of a worker to help set up the organ, Mr. Johnson readily applied for the job.

During the construction of the Hook organ, Johnson became interested in the art of organ building. The following winter he built a small parlor organ of just one rank. He continued his new craft, building seven more parlor organs in the next five years. In 1848, he built two small one-manual church organs of five or six ranks.

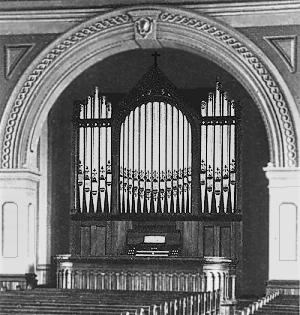
Opus 345

Continuing with church organ construction, Johnson built organs of increasing size. His first two-manual organ was Opus 13, 1849, at the Congregational Church in Westfield, Massachusetts. This organ contained about 15 ranks. Further expanding his territory and size, Opus 40, a 34-stop three-manual organ, was built in 1855 for the Park Presbyterian Church in Troy, New York. Another 1855 organ is believed to be the oldest Johnson organ which still exists in its original form. It is Johnson's Opus 43, built at the First Ward Presbyterian Church (later the Westminster Presbyterian Church) in Syracuse, New York. In 1870 Johnson's Opus 339 with 16 ranks was built and installed at the Universalist Church, now the Unitarian Universalist Congregation in Stamford, CT. It remains there today in its original form.

In 1871, a fire destroyed the Johnson factory. All tools and materials, along with Opus 348, 349, and 350 that were under construction were destroyed. At the time of the fire, Opus 345, a typical William Johnson tracker pipe organ of about 18 ranks (Pictured) was being installed at the First Baptist Church of Penn Yan, New York. Most of its pipework, some of the last to be built at the original factory, is still in use in the Church's present organ.

After the fire, the old First Congregational Church building (designed by Bullfinch) was utilized for a factory. About that time William A. Johnson's son William H. Johnson, who had worked in the shop since he was 16, became an official member of the firm. With a new name, "Johnson and Son", the company was back in operation soon enough to produce 52 new organs in Chicago, Illinois, after the 1871 Great Chicago Fire. A new factory was built in 1873, and another in the mid-1880s. Johnson and Son continued the work of the William A. Johnson Organ Company, building an additional 500 organs. Their largest organs were of around 55 ranks.

Throughout the years, Johnson organs were well known for their "excellent balance, splendid dignity, and beautiful voicing". Highest quality materials and workmanship were used, and Johnson's organ pipes were always of the finest quality. Tracker organs eventually became less popular, and, not wishing to switch to tubular-pneumatic- or electro-pneumatic-action organs, the company ceased operations in 1898. Their last organ was a large 3-manual organ, Opus 860, at St. Paul's Church in Chicago.

== Citations ==
Elsworth, John Van Varick (1984). The Johnson Organs. Boston: Boston Organ Club or the Organ Historical Society.
