= Great River Bridge (Westfield) =

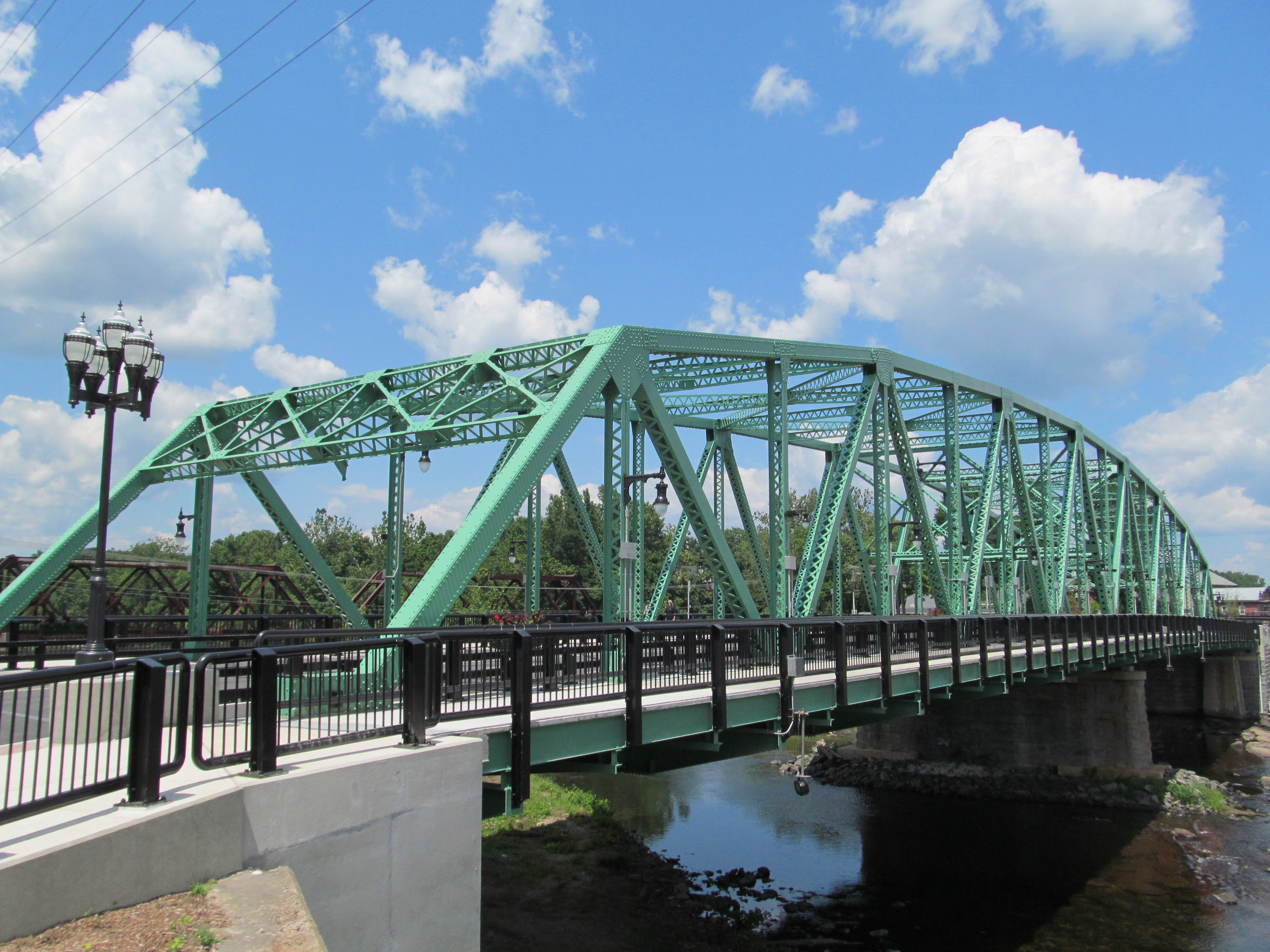
- Great River Bridge
- Coordinates: 42°7′44″N 72°44′45″W
- Carries: US 202 / Route 10
- Crosses: Westfield River
- Locale: Westfield, Massachusetts
- Maintained by: Westfield

Characteristics
- Design: polygonal Warren through truss
- Material: Steel
- No. of spans: 2
- Piers in water: 1

History
- Construction start: 1938 (south-bound); 2007 (north-bound)
- Construction end: 1939 (south-bound); 2009 (north-bound)

The Great River Bridge in Westfield, Massachusetts, is a pair of camelback truss spans over the Westfield River carrying US 202 / Route 10. The original bridge was completed in 1939, and a second bridge was finished in 2009.

== History ==
Begun after a flood in 1938 and completed the next year, the original bridge was the main north–south crossing of the river for seventy years.

With time, however, the span became a bottleneck that figuratively split the city. Starting no later than the 1970s, people started talking about taking some sort of action, and the result was the construction of a similar bridge 150 feet (46 m) downstream of the original, begun in 2007. The new bridge opened for traffic and the old one was closed for renovation on August 18, 2009. The area surrounding was improved with new sidewalks, lights, and pavement. The upstream (1938) bridge carries three lanes of southbound traffic, and the downstream (2007) bridge carries three lanes northbound. A small park lies between the approaches on both sides of the river.

One previous constraint was a low rail bridge to the north of the original span, which required trucks to take a circuitous route to get across the river. This bridge was replaced by a new one just south of the original, but still north of the original river crossing, with more elevation so that trucks could access the southbound (upstream) span.

In 2017, work began on conversion of the abandoned train bridge, upstream of the two road bridges, to a rail trail as part of the Columbia Greenway's final extension. The trail will connect to the bridge's parks.

== Reconstruction of the original bridge ==
Rehabilitation of the original bridge was halted in April 2010 because of the discovery of major deterioration of the understructure. It was reported on July 18, 2010, in The Republican of Springfield that another year would be added to the project at a cost of an additional "several million dollars", according to State Senator Michael Knapik. It was reopened in November 2011.
