= Seal of Westfield, Massachusetts =

Official seal of the city government

Seal of the City of City of Westfield, Massachusetts
- Armiger: Michael A. McCabe, Mayor of Westfield
- Adopted: April 1921
- Supporter: None
- Use: City flag, official correspondence, insignia of city agencies and institutions

The Seal of the City of Westfield, Massachusetts, is the official seal of the government of Westfield, Massachusetts, United States.

The seal, shown at right, was designed in 1921 by Ralph M. Sizer, a resident of Westfield, at the request of the city's first mayor, George W. Searle. Louis B. Warfield, also of Westfield, was the engraver of the seal, which was accepted by the city in April 1921.

The seal features an image of the General William Shepard Memorial located in Westfield. General William Shepard was a long-time revolutionary and spent most of his life and died in Westfield. Active in the protection of Westfield and its surrounding areas, Shepard was a significant person in the history of Westfield.
