= Naomi Safran-Hon =

Brooklyn based artist (born 1984)

Naomi Safran-Hon נעמי ספרן-הון
- Born: 1984 (age 41–42); Oxford, United Kingdom
- Education: Yale University School of Art; Brandeis University
- Known for: Contemporary Art; Mixed Media
- Website: http://naomisafranhon.com/home.html

Naomi Safran-Hon (Hebrew: נעמי ספרן-הון; born 1984 Oxford, UK) is an artist living and working in Brooklyn. She creates paintings that combine cement, lace, acrylic, and photographs.

== Biography ==
Naomi Safran-Hon was born in Oxford, England, and grew up in Haifa, Israel. She received a Bachelor of Arts degree summa cum laude from Brandeis University in 2008, in Studio Art and Art History, and a Masters of Fine Arts degree from Yale University School of Art in 2010. She is also a 2012 The Skowhegan School of Art residency alumnus.

Safran-Hon's recent work combines photographs of the dilapidated neighborhood of Wadi Salib in her hometown of Haifa with cement and lace, and uses an impressionist style to transform these images into mixed-media paintings. Her work investigates the concepts of home, domesticity, war, and displacement and is intrinsically tied to the Israeli-Palestinian Conflict. She received the Young Artist Award from the Hecht Museum at the University of Haifa, and in 2012 was chosen as one of five winning artists to exhibit at the Brooklyn Museum.

Safran-Hon has shown work in exhibitions including “Salmat Beton va-Melet Gown of Concrete and Cement” at the Brandt Gallery in Amsterdam and "Faux Sho" at the Islip Art Museum.

Safran-Hon's work is represented by Slag Gallery in Brooklyn.
