= Margaret Day Blake =

American art collector and philanthropist

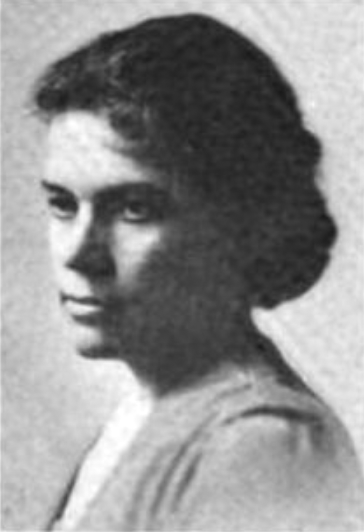
- Born: February 20, 1876; Springfield, Massachusetts
- Died: September 29, 1971 (aged 95)
- Occupations: Art collector, Philanthropist, Organizer
- Spouse: Tiffany Blake (m. 1905; died 1943)

Margaret Day Blake (February 20, 1876 – September 29, 1971) was the first woman Trustee of the Art Institute of Chicago. She collected drawings, which she donated to the Art Institute. She was also involved with the Woman's Land Army, chairing the group for the Illinois division.

== Life ==
Day was born in Springfield, Massachusetts, on February 20, 1876. She married Tiffany Blake, the chief editorial writer for the Chicago Tribune, in 1905. She attended the Skowhegan School of Painting and Sculpture in Skowhegan, Maine.

Blake became involved with the Woman's Land Army around 1918. She used her organizing skills to execute her idea of producing food for the WWI war effort, improving the lives of farm-wives, and bringing a knowledge of farming to educated urban women.

Carnival in Naples by Max Beckmann, 1925 (reworked in 1944)

After the death of her husband in 1943, Blake turned her attentions to the Art Institute of Chicago. She began assembling a collection of drawings spanning the early 15th century (a drawing by Antonio Pisano), through the 20th century (Carnival in Naples by Max Beckmann). These prints were donated to the Art Institute, becoming the "Margaret Day Blake Collection". The Institute held an exhibit of the collection in 1970.

Blake was also the first president of the Institute's Woman's Board, and the first woman Trustee of the Art Institute.

Blake died on September 29, 1971.
