= Dan Trant =

American basketball player and bond trader (1961-2001)

Personal information
- Born: May 15, 1961 Westfield, Massachusetts, U.S.
- Died: September 11, 2001 (aged 40) North Tower, World Trade Center, New York City, U.S.
- Listed height: 6 ft 2 in (1.88 m)
- Listed weight: 175 lb (79 kg)

Career information
- High school: Westfield (Westfield, Massachusetts)
- College: Clark (1980–1984)
- NBA draft: 1984: 10th round, 228th overall pick
- Drafted by: Boston Celtics
- Position: Guard
- Stats at Basketball Reference

Daniel Patrick Trant (May 15, 1961 – September 11, 2001) was an Irish-American professional basketball player and Cantor Fitzgerald bond trader killed in the September 11 attacks at the North Tower of World Trade Center in New York City. He grew up in Westfield, Massachusetts, and graduated from Westfield High School. His remains were never found.

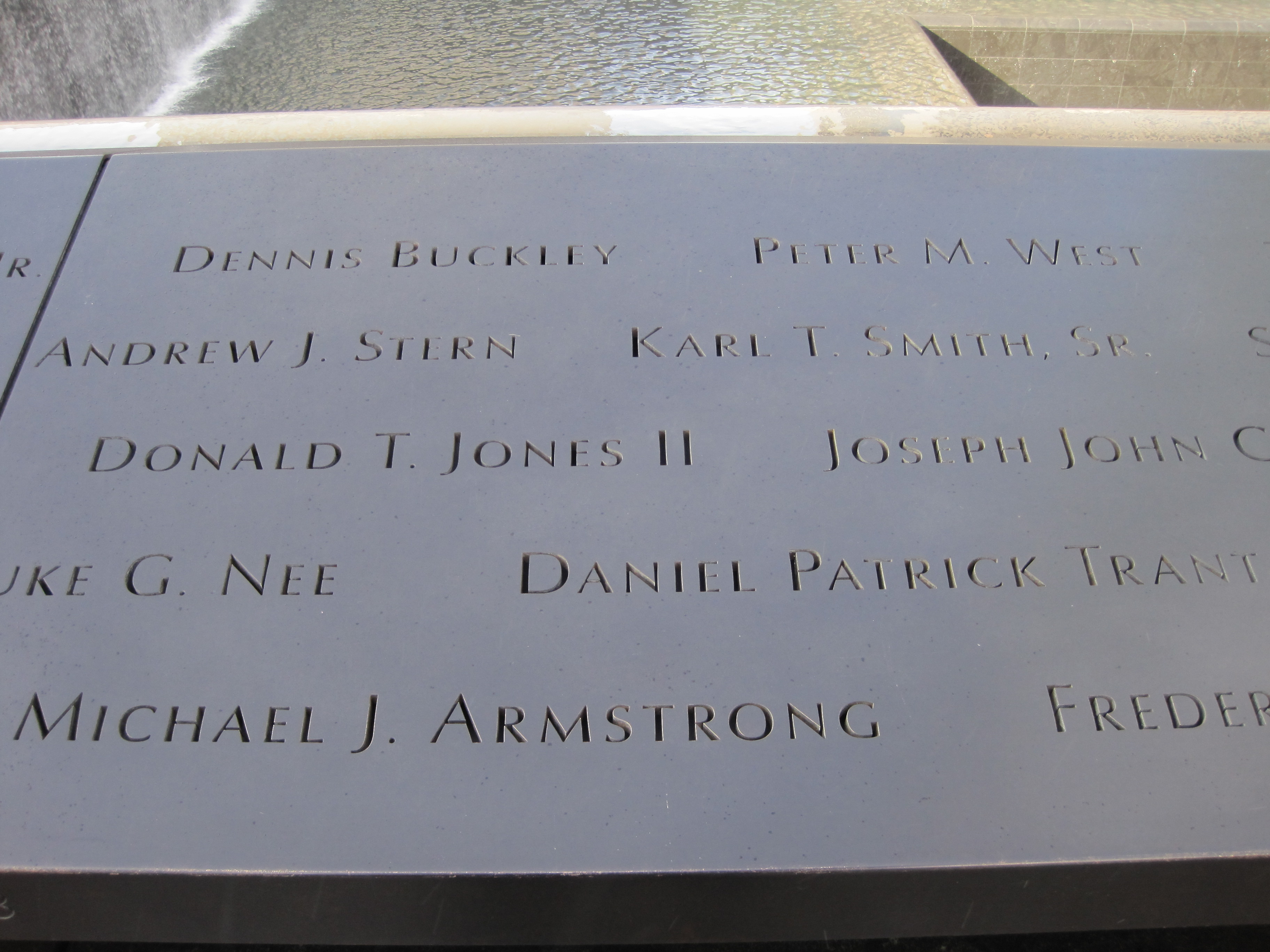
Memorial name plate of Dan Trant located at panel N-43, North Pool, National September 11 Memorial & Museum

Trant was drafted in the 10th round and was the 228th and last pick in the 1984 NBA draft. He was part of the 1984–85 Boston Celtics season. Trant attended Clark University. He played basketball professionally in Ireland and played for the Irish national basketball team.
