= Jessica Snow =

American abstract artist, curator and academic

- Born: 1964 (age 61–62)
- Education: University of California, Davis Skowhegan School of Painting and Sculpture Mills College
- Occupations: Abstract artist, curator, and professor
- Website: www.jessicasnowart.com

Jessica Snow (born 1964) is an American abstract artist, filmmaker, curator, and professor. Distinguishing characteristics of Snow’s paintings and drawings include bright, vivid colors through a visual language that employs color, shape and texture Snow's sources of artistic inspiration include landscape design, ancient art history, and the natural world. Her presentation of these subjects is influenced by traditions of geometric abstraction, biomorphism, and color field painting. She lives and works in San Francisco, California, where she teaches painting, drawing and art appreciation at the University of San Francisco.

== Education ==
Jessica Snow earned her Bachelor of Arts degree from the University of California, Davis in 1988, where she studied with Wayne Thiebaud, Squeak Carnwath and Cornelia Schultz. After attending a summer residency at the Skowhegan School of Painting and Sculpture in Skowhegan, Maine, she went on to earn her Master of Fine Arts degree from Mills College in Oakland, California in 1996, where she studied with Hung Liu, Ron Nagle, and Moira Roth.

== Work ==
Snow utilizes techniques, mediums, and approaches from multiple different aesthetic disciplines in order to create her work. Her recent work is the result of interacting with the sea to create spontaneous paintings, in which the seawater and paint interact. In prior bodies of work, she would occasionally create as many as 20 preliminary sketches in pencil or pen. Which art medium she uses depends on what surface material she is using at the time. For example, on one of her artist's pages, it states: "when working with paper, panels or walls, she will employ acrylics while she will paint with oil on canvas or linen. She also recently experimented working on Dibond, a lightweight aluminum panel where she will combine both oil and acrylic and sometimes will use a black fine-point pen when drawing on the surface".

== Exhibitions ==
Snow’s artwork has been extensively exhibited in the United States and abroad. Her body of work on the ancient Greek goddesses was exhibited at Greece’s Ionion Center for the Arts and Culture, where she completed a residency. Her recent body of work, 'Minoan Stories', was featured in a solo exhibition at Pastine Projects in San Francisco. Snow's work was featured in a group exhibition at the U.S. Embassy in Helsinki along with the artwork of Roy Lichtenstein and other notable artists. Snow's work is also featured in the exhibition's catalog. Other noteworthy exhibitions of Snow's art took place including at the Sonoma Valley Museum of Art in Sonoma, California, The Crocker Art Museum in Sacramento, California, the Riverside Art Museum in Riverside, California, the University of California, San Diego Art Museum, the Monterey Museum of Art (MMA) in Monterey, California, and at the US Embassy, in Montevideo, Uruguay. Snow was an Artist-Ambassador for the United States Department of State to Uruguay in 2007. Recent exhibitions include ‘Badass Color’, a 2-person exhibition at Le Pavé d’Orsay in Paris and The 5th International Biennale of Non-Objective Art in Pont de Claix, France. Snow recently received the Denis Diderot Fellowship residency program at the Château d'Orquevaux.

== Awards ==
- Artadia Award (2000)
- FICIMAD experimental film award (2023)
