= Diana Guerrero-Maciá =

American visual artist

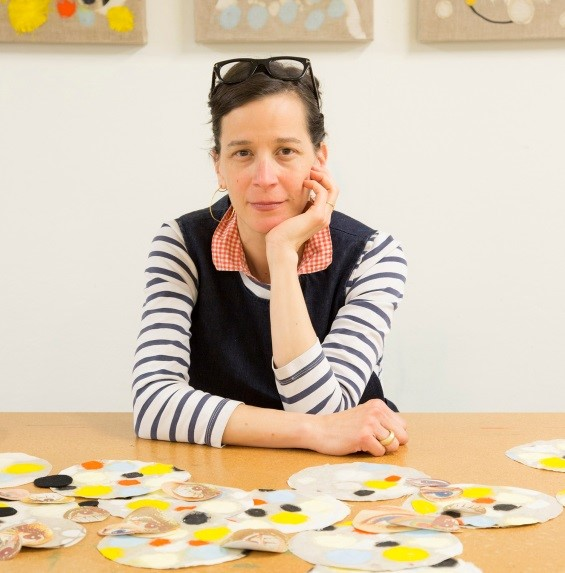
- Born: 1966 (age 59–60); Cleveland, Ohio, United States
- Education: Cranbrook Academy, Villanova University, Skowhegan School of Painting and Sculpture, Penland School of Craft
- Known for: Painting, collage, works on paper, sculpture
- Awards: Guggenheim Fellowship, Louis Comfort Tiffany Foundation, Illinois Arts Council
- Website: Diana Guerrero-Maciá

Diana Guerrero-Maciá, The Devil's Daughter is Getting Married, wool, dye, deconstructed clothing and textiles on canvas, 57.5" x 49.5", 2020.

Diana Guerrero-Maciá (born 1966) is an American studio-based artist who has produced paintings, works on paper, prints and sculpture. She is known for her hybrid or "unpainted paintings"—works constructed with fabric cutwork, collage, stitching and dye that collapse boundaries between the fields of painting, fiber and design and challenge distinctions between "high" art and craft. Her largely abstract work samples and revises multiple materials, symbols and typography, and graphic elements such as grids, stripes and archetypal shapes to engage with color, iconography and diverse cultural movements and conventions.

Guerrero-Maciá has exhibited in solo shows at the Museum of Contemporary Art, Chicago (MCA), Artpace and South Bend Museum of Art, and group exhibitions at the Bronx Museum of the Arts, Crocker Art Museum and John Michael Kohler Arts Center (JMKAC), among others. In 2021, she received a Guggenheim Fellowship, following earlier awards from organizations including the Louis Comfort Tiffany Foundation and MacDowell. Her work belongs to the permanent collections of the Crocker Museum, Jordan Schnitzer Museum of Art, and South Bend Museum of Art. Guerrero-Maciá is a professor at the School of the Art Institute of Chicago.

== Biography ==
Guerrero-Maciá was born in 1966 in Cleveland, Ohio to Cuban immigrant parents. Her mother was a Spanish literature professor and quilter and her father an industrial design engineer and inventor. She earned a BFA from Villanova University in 1988, then spent a year working on social justice issues in the San Francisco area with the Jesuit Volunteer Corps. In 1990, she enrolled in graduate studies at Cranbrook Academy of Art, where her work shifted from largely narrative, figural painting to non-traditional work involving textiles, craft-based processes, collage and appropriation, and the influence of lyrical poetry. After receiving an MFA from Cranbrook in 1992, she was awarded a residency at the Skowhegan School of Painting and Sculpture, where she developed relationships with other artists that encouraged her move to Chicago later that year.

Guerrero-Maciá had early solo shows at Artemisia Gallery and Contemporary Art Workshop in Chicago and Forum for Contemporary Art in St. Louis. In 2001, she joined the faculty of the School of the Art Institute of Chicago (SAIC) after teaching at School of Art at Washington University in St. Louis (now the Sam Fox School of Design & Visual Arts) from 1997 to 2001. She has taught in the Fiber & Material Studies and Painting & Drawing departments at SAIC, serving as chair of the former from 2016 to 2019.

== Work and reception ==
Critics situate Guerrero-Maciá's work at the intersection of painting, fiber, design and conceptual art traditions, noting its blurring of such boundaries and refusal of binaries such as "high" modernism or craft, formal severity or kitsch playfulness, geometric, hard-edged or biomorphic, pliable forms, the metaphysical or quotidian. She works in two- and three-dimensional media, with a long history of hybrid techniques including collage, assemblage, sewing and dyeing, sampling and appropriation inspired by the work of artists such as Robert Rauschenberg and the Pattern and Decoration movement.

Diana Guerrero-Maciá, The Bigger Picture, wool, vinyl, leather and burlap on canvas, 72" x 64", 2008.

Her hybrid paintings—encompassing hand-sewn textile and paper collages and reclaimed objects and clothing—employ a patchwork aesthetic in two ways: formally, using textiles like paint, as a vehicle for color, texture and depth; and as a method to sample styles, graphics, symbols of identity, histories and lived experiences. The resulting vocabulary engages themes involving visual and verbal language, the gendering of art genres, ethnicity and race, the body and social issues, often adopting historical iconography (e.g., medieval millefleur tapestries, 20th century radical movements such as Russian Suprematism, 1960s counterculture and punk rock) informed by contemporary social currents. West Coast critic DeWitt Cheng wrote that Diana Guerrero-Maciá wove together variegated cultural threads—revalidated decorative "women's art," text and word-based art, digital-age cross-pollination—into "samplers born of sampling, metaphors for wandering streams of consciousness, yet also satisfying artifacts."

=== Earlier work ===
In exhibitions at the MCA Chicago (2003), Artpace (2005) and Bodybuilder & Sportsman Gallery (2003, 2006), Guerrero-Maciá presented text-based, hand-sewn textile works and collages that reviews compared to ransom notes, commercial signage and the work of artists Ed Ruscha and Jenny Holzer. Made up largely of words with differently stitched, colored and shaped letter forms, they quoted films, songs and literature, newspaper headlines and colloquial speech—often statements involving love and war—in challenging arrangements that used odd word mash-ups or breaks to alter meanings. Chicago Tribune critic Alan Artner wrote that the fiber medium and its stitched technique created a "mildly startling" sense of strangeness unachievable in painting and at odds with the vaguely familiar sentiments being reproduced.

In her show "Devoured by Symbols" (Tony Wight, 2008), Guerrero-Maciá recontextualized incongruous, familiar or banal mediated text and, increasingly, imagery in stitched, multi-textile works that playfully reworked painting conventions invoking the sublime: landscape, portrait, narrative, abstraction (e.g., The Tempest, Like a Rainbow). In the large-scale work, The Bigger Picture, she operated like a concrete poet, creating a visual mountain out of the letters that comprise the word "mountains." New City described the show as a "convergence of typography … feel-good imagery, fuzzy materiality and tragically romantic quotations" that evoked contemporary political anxiety and a sense of "good wishes unfulfilled."

Diana Guerrero-Maciá, Always the Sun (An Intersectional Sunrise), exhibition installation image, Kohler Art Center, 2021.

=== Later work ===
In the 2010s, in exhibitions at Traywick Contemporary (Berkeley), the South Bend Museum of Art and Carrie Secrist (Chicago), among others, Guerrero-Maciá gradually shifted emphasis from text toward borrowed symbols and archetypal forms that she cut, dyed and stitched into bold, geometric compositions. Like her text pieces, these works connected ubiquitous icons—in this case, smiley faces, rainbows, targets, butterflies, hearts—with art historical references through graphic schemes, using diagrams or charts to reinvigorate their meanings and pose questions through cryptic personal and cultural references (e.g., her "Slow Blossoming" works, 2016). Among those meanings were messages embedded within the work's laborious, deliberately analog, handmade processes and tactile materials, related to gender and sexual equality, environmental and military concerns, cosmic speculation, and art/craft hierarchies,.

Guerrero-Maciá's show "Siblings of the Sun" (2015) explored the theory that unknown universes were created by the Big Bang, its centerpiece an array of fifty small collages featuring bright color and simple geometric forms that DeWitt Cheng described as "an apt metaphor for the current art cosmos: pluralistic, hybrid, and buzzing with free-floating contradictions." Her "The Beautiful Girls" (2018) edition of prints presented diverse representations of gender and ethnicity through the visual motif of eyes, inspired by Hannah Höch’s Ethnographic Museum photomontages of the 1920s. In the show "The Devil's Daughter is Getting Married" (Secrist, 2020) and works such as Always the Sun (An Intersectional Sunrise) (JMKAC, "High Touch" exhibition, 2021), Guerrero-Maciá presented paper collages and monumental gridded fields of cut cloth ornamented with three-dimensional props and familiar graphic motifs, which explored the visual pleasure of decoration, as well as subtle narratives about the ambitions of modernist abstraction, needlework and feminism, myth and her Cuban upbringing.

== Recognition ==
Guerrero-Maciá has received fellowship from the John S. Guggenheim Foundation (2021), Illinois Arts Council (2019) and MacDowell (2022, 2004, 1998) and an award from the Louis Comfort Tiffany Foundation (2001). She has been awarded public art commissions from the Public Art Fund in New York and the Chicago Department of Cultural Affairs. Her work has been acquired by the public art collections of corporations, universities and museums including the Crocker Art Museum, Davis Museum at Wellesley College, Jordan Schnitzer Museum of Art and South Bend Museum of Art.
