= Sabrina Tavernise =

American journalist (born 1971)

- Born: February 24, 1971 (age 54); Hartford, Connecticut, U.S.
- Education: Columbia University (BA)
- Occupations: Journalist; war correspondent; podcast host
- Years active: 1997–present
- Employers: The New York Times; Bloomberg
- Notable credits: The New York Times; The Daily

Sabrina Tavernise (born February 24, 1971) is an American journalist who writes for The New York Times. She was formerly a co-host of the Times' podcast The Daily, before she announced that she would be leaving as a co-host on March 26, 2025. She has been a war correspondent for the Times from Iraq, Lebanon, and Russia, including recent dispatches from the Russian invasion of Ukraine.

== Early life and education ==
Raised in Granville, Massachusetts, Tavernise went to Westfield High School, and graduated in 1993 with a B.A. in Russian studies from Barnard College of Columbia University.

In 1995, she moved to Magadan, Russia, where she managed a business training center funded by the United States Agency for International Development.

== Career ==
In 1997, after moving to Moscow, Tavernise was a freelance writer for publications including BusinessWeek. From 1997 to 1999, she worked for Bloomberg News.

In 2000, she joined The New York Times as a Moscow correspondent; from 2003 to 2007 she was based in Iraq, where her coverage included 2005 sectarian cleansing. Later she moved to Pakistan, and Turkey, as the bureau chief in Istanbul.

In 2010, she became a national correspondent covering demographics, and was the lead writer for the Times on the 2010 United States census, capturing major demographic shifts underway in the United States, including in mortality and fertility, race and ethnicity.

In March 2022, Tavernise joined Michael Barbaro as the second host of The New York Times podcast The Daily, following her dispatches from the Russian invasion of Ukraine.

In March 2025, Tavernise announced that she was leaving The Daily as a co-host, and would be returning to her first love, reporting.

== Awards ==
In the 2003 Kurt Schork awards, Tavernise received an honorable mention for "her depth and human insight in covering Russia".
