= Amy Feldman =

American painter (born 1981)

- Born: 1981 (age 44–45); New Windsor, New York, U.S.
- Known for: Painting
- Website: amyfeldmanstudio.com

Amy Feldman (born 1981) is an American abstract painter from Brooklyn, New York.

== Education ==
Amy Feldman received a BFA degree in painting from the Rhode Island School of Design in Providence, Rhode Island in 2003. She then attended Rutgers University in New Brunswick, New Jersey where she received an MFA in Painting in 2008. She subsequently attended the Skowhegan School of Painting and Sculpture for a nine-week residency in 2009.

Feldman is the recipient of a Guggenheim Fellowship (2018) and Joan Mitchell Foundation Grant (2013).

== Work ==
Amy Feldman, Mr & Mrs, 2012, Acrylic on canvas, 75 x 80 inches

Feldman's work has been shown in galleries and museums since 2008. Her work is planned and spontaneously painted with loosely geometric, graphic gestures in whites to dark grays on various whites to gray grounds.

The stark contrast between figure and ground in Feldman's paintings is initially arresting, then subsequently complicated, exploratory, and meditative. Feldman's bold, urgent, and large scale abstract paintings are often anthropomorphic and darkly humorous with psychologically charged imagery. Her stripped down abstract sign system addresses, among other things, topology, morphology, and the perception and transmission of information.

Feldman's artistic influences range from Cubism to the works of Henri Matisse, Jean Arp, Ellsworth Kelly, Shirley Jaffe, Mary Heilmann, and Robert Ryman.

Feldman's work are in the permanent collections of the Museum of Contemporary Art in Chicago, the Sheldon Museum of Art in Lincoln, Nebraska, the Hall Art Foundation in Derneburg, Germany, and the Vanhaerents Art Collection in Brussels, Belgium. She lives and works in Brooklyn, New York.

== Exhibitions ==
=== Solo exhibitions ===
- Good Fortune: Eva Presenhuber, Vienna, Austria, 2025
- Quick Epic: Knust Kunz Gallery, Munich, Germany, 2023
- Heart Arts: Anna Bohman Gallery, Stockholm, Sweden, 2023
- Goodnight Light: Eva Presenhuber, Zurich, Switzerland, 2022
- Mothercolor: Eva Presenhuber, New York, NY, 2021
- Counter Ground: ANNAELLEGallery, Stockholm, Sweden, 2018
- Nerve Reserve: James Cohan Gallery, New York, NY, 2017
- Breath Myth: Blain|Southern, Berlin, Germany, 2017
- Psyche Shade: Ratio 3, San Francisco, CA, 2016
- Good Gloom: Corbett vs. Dempsey, Chicago, IL, 2016
- Moon Decorum: Brand New Gallery, Milan, Italy, 2015
- Trice Electric: ANNAELLE Gallery, Stockholm, Sweden, 2015
- Mirror Cool: Reynolds Gallery, Richmond, VA, 2015
- High Sign: Blackston Gallery, New York, NY, 2014
- Gray Area: Sorry, We're Closed Gallery, Brussels, Belgium, 2014
- Stark Types: ANNAELLEGallery, Stockholm, Sweden, 2013
- Raw Graces: Gregory Lind Gallery, San Francisco, CA, 2013
- Dark Selects: Blackston Gallery, New York, NY, 2012

=== Selected group exhibitions ===
- The Twilight Zone: Left Field Gallery, Los Osos, CA, 2024
- All That Is Solid Melts Into Air: Klaus Von Nichtssagend Gallery, New York, NY, 2019
- Mutual Ritual: 39 Great Jones, New York, NY, curated by Ugo Rondinone, 2019
- This and That: Some Recent Acquisitions: Hall Art Foundation | Schloss Derneburg Museum, Derneburg, Germany, 2018
- nonObjectives: Sheldon Museum of Art, Lincoln, NE, 2017
- Playground Structure: Blain|Southern, London, UK, 2017
- Quicktime: University of the Arts, Philadelphia, PA, 2017
- Heartbreak Hotel: Invisible Exports, New York, NY, 2017
- MCA DNA: Riot Grrrls: Museum of Contemporary Art, Chicago, IL, curated by Michael Darling, 2016-2017
- The Congregation, Jack Hanley Gallery, New York, NY, 2016
- Amy Feldman, Lucio Fontana, Maximilian Schubert, Alan Wiener: 11R Gallery, New York, NY, 2016
- Face to Face: Palazzo Fruscione, Salerno, Italy, curated by Eugenio Viola, 2016
- New York Painting: Kunstmuseum Bonn, Bonn, Germany, 2015
- I Know You Got Soul: ARNDT Singapore, 2015
- 2159 Miles: Museo Britanico Americano, Mexico City, and Casa Blanca, San Juan, PR, 2015
- This One's Optimistic: Pincushion: New Britain Museum of American Art, New Britain, CT, 2014
- The New York Moment: Museum of Contemporary Art, St. Etienne, France, 2014
- Annual Invitational Exhibition, The Academy of Arts and Letters, New York, NY, 2013
- An Exhibition on the Centenary of the 1913 Armory Show: DECENTER: Henry Street Settlement/Abrons Art Center, New York, NY, curated by Daniel Palmer and Andrianna Campbell, 2013

== Awards ==
- The Pollock-Krasner Foundation Grant, 2021
- John Simon Guggenheim Memorial Foundation Fellowship, 2018
- Casa Wabi Residency, Oaxaca, Mexico, 2014
- Chandelier Creative Residency, Montauk, New York, 2014
- Annual 2013 Painters & Sculptors Grant, The Joan Mitchell Foundation, New York, New York, 2013
- Andree Stone Emerging Artist Prize, Expo Chicago, Chicago, IL, 2013
- The Marie Walsh Sharpe Foundation Fellowship, 2012-2013
- Henry Street Settlement/Abrons Art Center AIRspace Residency, 2011-2012
- The Robert Motherwell Fellowship, The MacDowell Colony, 2011-2012
- Yaddo Fellowship, 2011
- New Jersey State Council on the Arts Fellowship, 2011
- VCUarts Fountainhead Arts Fellowship at Virginia Commonwealth University 2008-2009
