= Skowhegan School of Painting and Sculpture =

Art school in Maine, United States

Skowhegan School of Art
- Established: 1946
- Location: 39 Art School Road; Madison, Maine, United States
- Type: Artists Residency
- Website: www.skowheganart.org

The Skowhegan School of Painting and Sculpture is an artists residency located in Madison, Maine, United States. Every year, the program accepts online applications from emerging artists from November through January, and selects 65 to participate in the nine-week intensive summer program. Admissions decisions are announced in April. The school provides participants with housing, food, and studio space, and the campus offers a library, media lab, and sculpture shop, among other amenities. The tuition for the program is $6,000, however, aid is available.

While on campus, the participants interact with five or six resident faculty artists for the duration of the program, as well as five to seven visiting faculty artists, both of whom are selected by Skowhegan’s Board of Governors. Participants are not allowed to bring family or friends with them to Skowhegan, nor are visitors allowed on campus. Lectures by faculty artists, which are generally held on Fridays, are open to the public.

== History ==
During World War II, New England portrait painter Willard Warren Cummings was stationed in Alaska in the War Art Unit. There, he shared his idea for an educational model “where young artists could study with leading artists of the time” with Sidney Simon, a sculptor also in the Unit. Upon returning from the war in 1946, with the help of Simon, Henry Varnum Poor, already an established presence in American Art, and Charles Cutler, a New England stone sculptor, Cummings turned his family farm into a functional alternative school run by artists for artists.

As the name indicates, Skowhegan was originally focused on the traditional art forms of painting and sculpture, but gradually, the program began accepting artists of all practices, even being the alleged site of the first contemporary Land Art piece in 1968 by Douglas Leichter and Richard Saba.

Similarly, while the school originally offered classes such as life drawing or plein air painting, it eventually forwent traditional forms of instruction save for weekly faculty lectures, and all classes on campus are now self-directed by participants. Fresco instruction, however, has always been a part of the program. Today, Skowhegan is one of the few institutions in the United States that teaches this technique. N. Sean Glover was the fresco instructor from 2010 to 2019, when Oscar Rene Cornejo took over.

Since 1952, Skowhegan has recorded the lectures given on campus by resident and visiting faculty artists. They now comprise an archive of over 700 lectures and are accessible to artists and researchers in select repositories including The Colby College Museum of Art, The Archives of American Art, The Art Institute of Chicago, The Getty Research Institute, and The Museum of Modern Art.

== Notable alumni ==
See also Category list of Skowhegan School of Painting and Sculpture alumni.

Skowhegan alumni have included a number of well-known artists, including:

- Ellen Altfest '02
- Nicole Awai '97
- Firelei Báez
- Timothy Bellavia '97
- Margaret Day Blake
- Lee Bontecou
- Garrett Bradley '15
- Brian Bress
- Sarah Cain '06
- Nicole Cherubini
- Gregory Coates
- William Cordova
- Michael Corris '70
- Dan Corson
- Erika Cosby
- David Driskell '53
- Amy Feldman '09
- Ruth E. Fine 1961
- Victoria Fu '06
- Chitra Ganesh '01
- Diana Guerrero-Maciá '92
- Diana al-Hadid '07
- Chase Hall
- Lauren Halsey '14
- Teresa Hubbard '87
- Isabelle Johnson
- Robert Indiana
- Alex Katz
- Ellsworth Kelly
- Baseera Khan
- Dimitar Lukanov '95
- Cabot Lyford '47
- Enrique Martinez Celaya '94
- Lester Julian Merriweather '02
- John J. O'Connor (artist)
- Tameka Norris
- Sheila Pepe '94
- William Pope.L
- R. H. Quaytman '82
- Naomi Safran-Hon '12
- Jean Shin '99
- Zak Smith
- Vincent D. Smith
- Jessica Snow '92
- Hugh Auchincloss Steers '91
- Nari Ward '91
- Chris Ware '89
- Pae White

== Faculty ==
- William Zorach
- Karl Zerbe
- Henry Varnum Poor
- Jack Levine
- Herb Aach
- Berenice Abbott
