= Westfield, Massachusetts =

City in the United States

- City
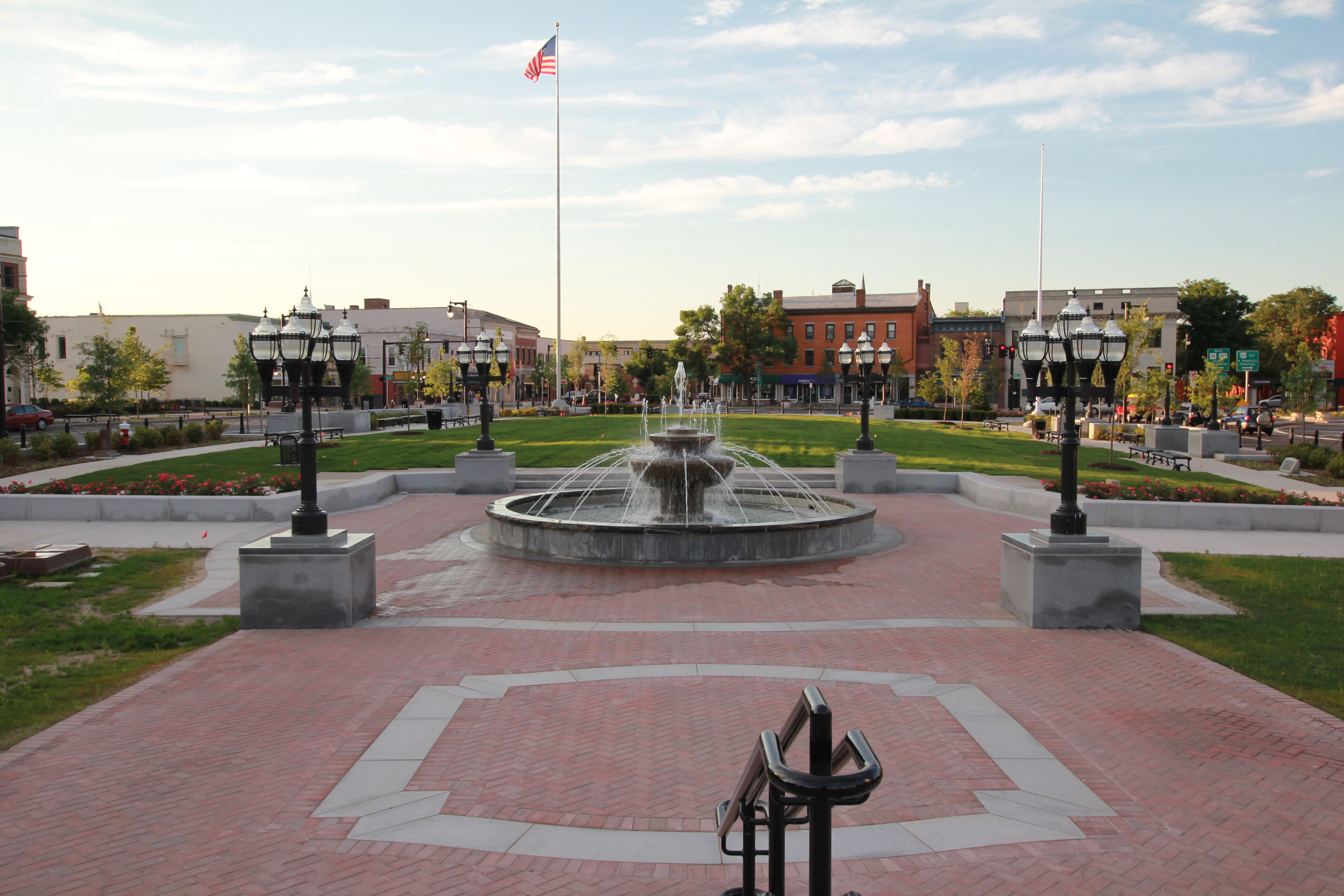
- Downtown Westfield and Park Square

- Flag Seal
- Nickname: The Whip City
- Motto: "Community Driven"
- Location in Hampden County in Massachusetts
- Coordinates: 42°07′30″N 72°45′00″W
- Country: United States
- State: Massachusetts
- County: Hampden
- Settled: 1660
- Incorporated (town): May 19, 1669
- Incorporated (city): November 2, 1920

Government
  - Type: Mayor-council city
  - Mayor: Michael A. McCabe (R)

Area
  - Total: 47.31 sq mi (122.54 km^{2})
  - Land: 46.26 sq mi (119.81 km^{2})
  - Water: 1.05 sq mi (2.73 km^{2}) 2.24%
- Elevation: 148 ft (45 m)

Population (2020)
  - Total: 40,834
  - Density: 882.7/sq mi (340.81/km^{2})
- Time zone: UTC−5 (Eastern)
  - Summer (DST): UTC−4 (Eastern)
- ZIP Codes: 01085–01086
- Area codes: 413
- FIPS code: 25-76030
- GNIS feature ID: 0608962
- Website: www.cityofwestfield.org

Westfield is a city in Hampden County, in the Pioneer Valley of western Massachusetts, United States. Westfield was first settled by Europeans in 1660. It is part of the Springfield, Massachusetts Metropolitan Statistical Area. The population was 40,834 at the 2020 census.

== History ==
The area was originally inhabited by the Pocomtuc, and was called Waranoke or Woronoco (meaning "the winding land"). Trading houses were built in 1639 to 1640 by European settlers from the Connecticut Colony. Massachusetts asserted jurisdiction, and prevailed after a boundary survey. In 1647, Massachusetts made Woronoco part of Springfield. Land was "incrementally purchased from the Native Americans and granted by the Springfield town meeting to English settlers, beginning in 1658." The area of Woronoco or "Streamfield" began to be permanently settled in the 1660s. In 1669, "Westfield" was incorporated as an independent town; in 1920, it would be re-incorporated as a city. The name Westfield would be named for being at the time the most westerly settlement. "Streamfield" was considered a name for the town for being settled in between two "streams" that flow downtown, the Westfield River and the Little River.

From its founding until 1725, Westfield was the westernmost settlement in the Massachusetts Colony, and portions of it fell within the Equivalent Lands. Town meetings were held in a church meeting house until 1839, when Town Hall was erected on Broad Street. This building also served as City Hall from 1920 to 1958. Due to its alluvial lands, the inhabitants of the Westfield area were entirely devoted to agricultural pursuits for about 150 years.

Early in the 19th century, the manufacture of bricks, whips, and cigars became economically important. At one point in the 19th century, Westfield was a prominent center of the buggy whip industry, and the city is still known as the "Whip City". Other firms produced bicycles, paper products, pipe organs, boilers and radiators, textile machinery, abrasives, wood products, and precision tools. Westfield transformed itself from an agricultural town into a thriving industrial city in the 19th century, but in the second half of the 20th century its manufacturing base was eroded by wage competition in the U.S. Southeast, then overseas.

Meanwhile, with cheap land and convenient access to east–west and north–south interstate highways, the north side developed into a warehousing center to C & S Wholesale, Home Depot, Lowes and other corporations. South of the river, the intersecting trends of growth of Westfield State University and declining manufacturing changed the city's character. Students comprise some 15% of Westfield's population, and the old downtown business district caters increasingly to them while mainstream shopping relocates to a commercial strip called East Main Street, part of U.S. Route 20.

Only four buildings exceed four stories in height. Until a major fire on January 6, 1952, the Westfield Professional Building covered half a downtown city block and was six stories tall. The entire building was consumed with extensive damage to neighboring buildings because the fire department's ladder and snorkel vehicles weren't tall enough and the building did not have a sprinkler system. Subsequent zoning prohibited virtually all new construction over three stories, even after improvements in fire suppression technologies and vehicles became available. No building is allowed to be taller than the town's firetruck ladders.

In the early 20th century, Westfield was at the center of the Pure Food movement, an effort to require stricter standards on the production of food. Louis B. Allyn, a Westfield resident and pure foods expert for McClure's Magazine, lived in Westfield until his murder. In 1906, Congress passed the Pure Food and Drug Act of 1906. In June 2017, the administration of Massachusetts Governor Charlie Baker announced a $300,000 grant to the city for an industrial park expansion.

In 1939, Westfield became the first city in Massachusetts, as well as all of New England, to elect a female Mayor when Alice Burke defeated incumbent Raymond H. Cowing.

== Geography ==
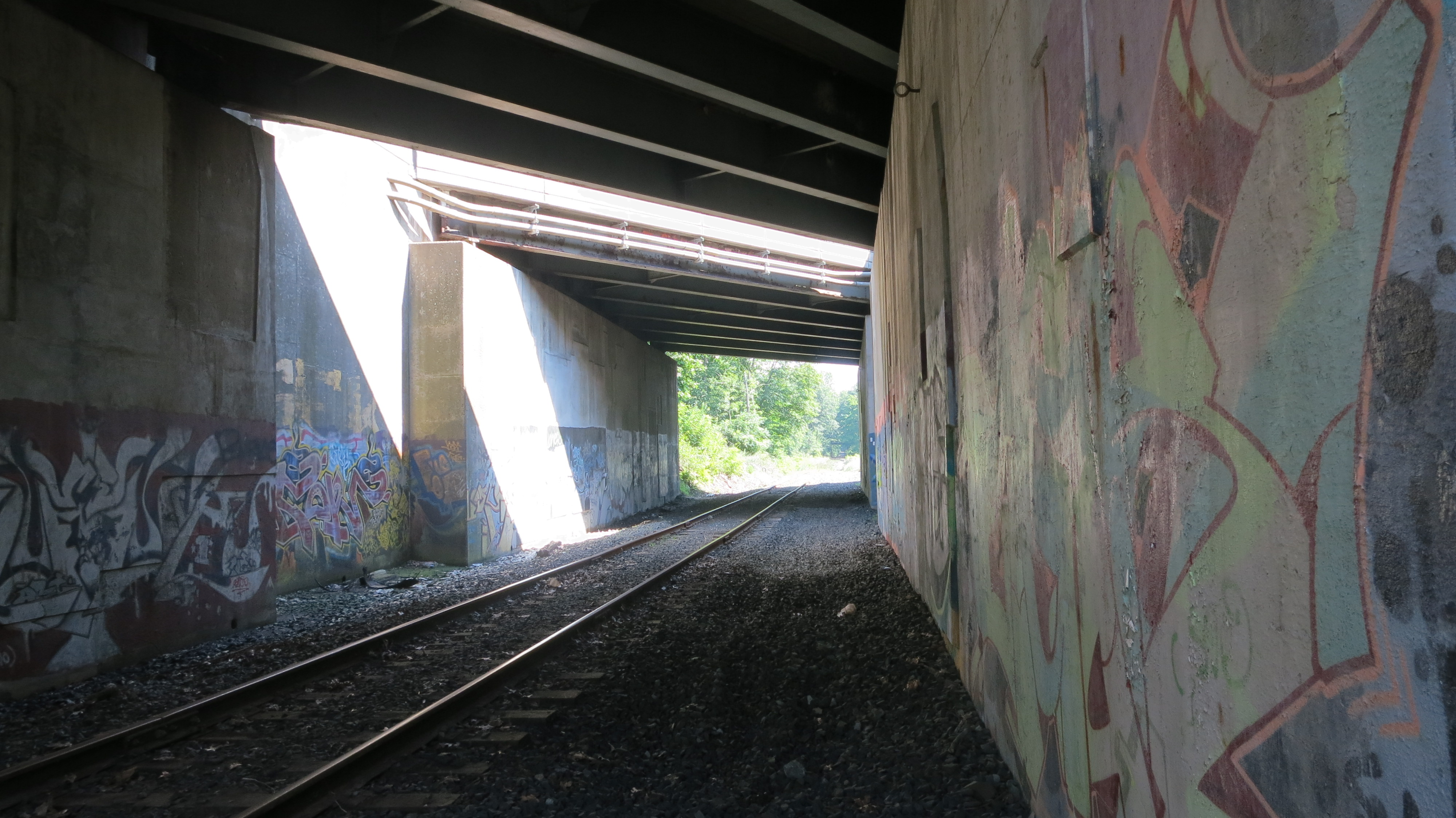
Replete with interesting graffiti, the M&M Trail passes beneath the Mass Pike along with the railroad

Westfield is located at 42°7′46″N 72°44′46″W (42.129492, −72.745986). It is bordered on the north by Southampton, on the northeast by Holyoke, on the east by West Springfield, on the southeast by Agawam, on the south by Southwick, on the southwest by Granville, on the west by Russell, and on the northwest by Montgomery. Westfield is split into the "South Side" and the "North Side" by the Westfield River, and the northwestern section of town is known as Wyben.

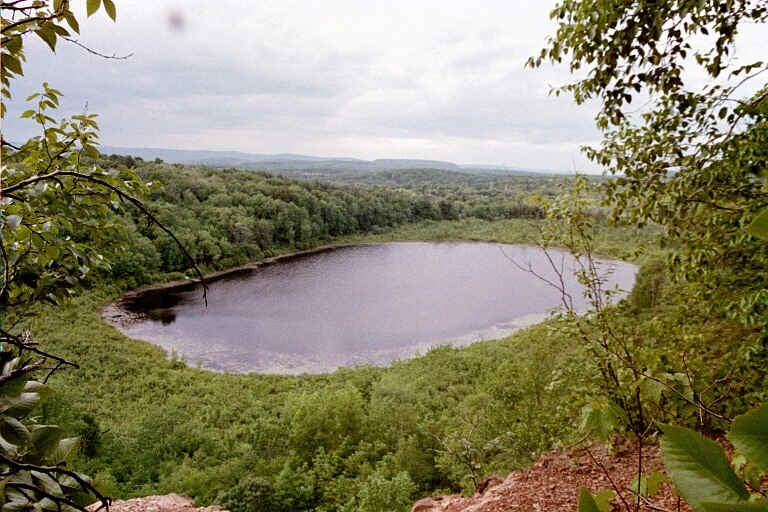
View of Snake Pond and the distant Westfield countryside from East Mountain in Holyoke

According to the United States Census Bureau, the city has a total area of 47.4 square miles (122.7 km^{2}), of which 46.3 square miles (120.0 km^{2}) are land and 1.1 square miles (2.8 km^{2}), or 2.24%, are water.

Westfield is situated at the western edge of the downfaulted Connecticut River Valley where the Westfield River emerges from the Berkshire Hills and flows through the center of the city on its way to the Connecticut River some 10 miles (16 km) downstream. Because of its large, steep and rocky upstream watershed, the river has a history of severe flood episodes, inundating adjacent parts of Westfield several times. In spite of a complicated system of pumps, dikes, waterways, and upstream dams, Westfield lies in a floodplain zone and is still considered flood-prone.

Westfield is bordered on the east by linear cliffs of volcanic trap rock known as East Mountain and Provin Mountain. They are part of the Metacomet Ridge, a mountainous trap rock ridgeline that stretches from Long Island Sound to nearly the Vermont border. Both mountains are traversed by the 114-mile (183 km) Metacomet-Monadnock Trail, that also crosses the Westfield River with an ill-advised fording or a safer road-walk across the bridge at the junction of Routes 187 and 20. The next road obstacle for hikers in Westfield is the Massachusetts Turnpike, beneath which hikers can safely walk.

Westfield is on the fringe of the greater Northeast megalopolis—the most densely populated region of the United States—and has experienced substantial land development for suburban residential and commercial uses for the past six decades. Yet it borders hilltowns to the west that were depopulated of subsistence farmers in the 19th century as land became readily available on the western frontier. With population dipping below ten per square kilometer in some upland townships, forests are reverting almost to pre-settlement conditions with wild turkey, bears, coyotes and even moose returning after absences perhaps measured in centuries. This transition over a few miles from the 21st century urbanization to population densities nearly as low as early colonial times is notable if not unique.

Westfield is located 10 miles (16 km) west of Springfield, 39 miles (63 km) southeast of Pittsfield, 95 miles (153 km) west of Boston, 30 miles (48 km) north of Hartford, Connecticut, 76 miles (122 km) southeast of Albany, New York, and 145 miles (233 km) northeast of New York City.

=== Climate ===
Climate data for Westfield-Barnes Regional Airport, Massachusetts (1981–2010 normals, extremes 1926–present (Note: Records maintained at Westfield-Barnes Regional Airport since August 1998, and at the Westfield COOP before December 1995.))
Month	Jan	Feb	Mar	Apr	May	Jun	Jul	Aug	Sep	Oct	Nov	Dec	Year
Record high °F (°C)	71 (22)	79 (26)	83 (28)	95 (35)	98 (37)	102 (39)	103 (39)	101 (38)	97 (36)	87 (31)	76 (24)	73 (23)	103 (39)
Mean daily maximum °F (°C)	32.9 (0.5)	37.0 (2.8)	45.9 (7.7)	59.1 (15.1)	70.5 (21.4)	78.0 (25.6)	82.8 (28.2)	81.5 (27.5)	74.0 (23.3)	61.6 (16.4)	49.4 (9.7)	38.2 (3.4)	59.3 (15.2)
Mean daily minimum °F (°C)	12.9 (−10.6)	17.4 (−8.1)	25.1 (−3.8)	35.4 (1.9)	45.5 (7.5)	54.7 (12.6)	59.0 (15.0)	58.5 (14.7)	49.8 (9.9)	38.2 (3.4)	30.0 (−1.1)	21.0 (−6.1)	37.4 (3.0)
Record low °F (°C)	−14 (−26)	−20 (−29)	−14 (−26)	17 (−8)	25 (−4)	34 (1)	40 (4)	41 (5)	28 (−2)	18 (−8)	2 (−17)	−14 (−26)	−20 (−29)
Average precipitation inches (mm)	3.26 (83)	2.83 (72)	4.10 (104)	4.37 (111)	4.44 (113)	4.35 (110)	4.09 (104)	4.16 (106)	4.49 (114)	4.75 (121)	4.12 (105)	3.43 (87)	48.39 (1,229)
Source: NOAA

== Demographics ==
Historical population
Year	Pop.	±%
1790	2,204	—
1800	2,185	−0.9%
1810	2,130	−2.5%
1820	2,668	+25.3%
1830	2,940	+10.2%
1840	3,526	+19.9%
1850	4,180	+18.5%
1860	5,055	+20.9%
1870	6,519	+29.0%
1880	7,587	+16.4%
1890	9,805	+29.2%
1900	12,310	+25.5%
1910	16,044	+30.3%
1920	18,604	+16.0%
1930	19,775	+6.3%
1940	18,793	−5.0%
1950	20,962	+11.5%
1960	26,302	+25.5%
1970	31,433	+19.5%
1980	36,465	+16.0%
1990	38,372	+5.2%
2000	40,072	+4.4%
2010	41,094	+2.6%
2020	40,834	−0.6%
2024*	40,403	−1.1%
* = population estimate. Source: United States census records and Population Estimates Program data. Source: U.S. Decennial Census

=== 2020 census ===
As of the 2020 census, Westfield had a population of 40,834. The median age was 40.6 years. 18.6% of residents were under the age of 18 and 19.1% of residents were 65 years of age or older. For every 100 females there were 94.4 males, and for every 100 females age 18 and over there were 92.0 males age 18 and over.

92.5% of residents lived in urban areas, while 7.5% lived in rural areas.

There were 15,887 households in Westfield, of which 26.4% had children under the age of 18 living in them. Of all households, 45.9% were married-couple households, 18.8% were households with a male householder and no spouse or partner present, and 27.7% were households with a female householder and no spouse or partner present. About 29.9% of all households were made up of individuals and 13.0% had someone living alone who was 65 years of age or older.

There were 16,869 housing units, of which 5.8% were vacant. The homeowner vacancy rate was 0.9% and the rental vacancy rate was 5.8%.

Racial composition as of the 2020 census
Race	Number	Percent
White	34,497	84.5%
Black or African American	828	2.0%
American Indian and Alaska Native	110	0.3%
Asian	953	2.3%
Native Hawaiian and Other Pacific Islander	13	0.0%
Some other race	1,598	3.9%
Two or more races	2,835	6.9%
Hispanic or Latino (of any race)	3,942	9.7%

=== 2010 census ===
At the 2010 census, there were 41,094 people, 15,335 households and 10,041 families residing in the city. The population density was 860.3 inhabitants per square mile (332.2/km^{2}). There were 16,075 housing units at an average density of 331.5 per square mile (128.0/km^{2}). The racial makeup of the city was 92.8% White, 1.6% African American, 0.3% Native American, 1.3% Asian, 0.0% Pacific Islander, 2.2% from other races, and 1.8% from two or more races. Hispanic or Latino of any race were 7.5% of the population.

There were 14,797 households, of which 31.5% had children under the age of 18 living with them, 53.0% were married couples living together, 10.6% had a female householder with no husband present, and 32.3% were non-families. Of all households 25.9% were made up of individuals, and 10.9% had someone living alone who was 65 years of age or older. The average household size was 2.54 and the average family size was 3.07.

Age distribution was 23.8% under the age of 18, 12.6% from 18 to 24, 28.0% from 25 to 44, 21.9% from 45 to 64, and 13.7% who were 65 years of age or older. The median age was 36 years. For every 100 females, there were 93.7 males. For every 100 females age 18 and over, there were 90.8 males.

The median household income was $45,240, and the median family income was $55,327. Males had a median income of $38,316 versus $27,459 for females. The per capita income for the city was $20,600. About 6.9% of families and 11.3% of the population were below the poverty line, including 16.2% of those under age 18 and 9.5% of those age 65 or over.

== Government and politics ==
Westfield is governed by a mayor and a city council, elected every two years. The office of the mayor is responsible for a variety of services throughout the city, and the mayor also serves as chairman of the School Committee. The City Council meets the first and third Thursday of every month at 7:30 p.m. in City Hall.

Westfield was involved in a mitigation action regarding water contaminated with per- and polyfluoroalkyl substances.

The current mayor of Westfield is Michael A. McCabe. In the Massachusetts General Court, the current senator, representing the Second Hampden and Hampshire district, is John Velis. The representative for the Fourth Hampden district is Kelly Pease. Westfield is located in the Eighth Massachusetts Governor's Council district and is represented by Tara Jacobs.

The Westfield City Council is composed of the following members:

Ward	Councilor	Years on City Council
Ward 1	Nicholas J. Morganelli, Jr.	2008–2011, 2018, 2020–present
Ward 2	Ralph J. Figy	2014–present
Ward 3	Bridget Matthews-Kane	2020–present
Ward 4	Michael J. Burns	2018–present
Ward 5	John J. Beltrandi, III	2010–2013, 2017–present
Ward 6	William Onyski	2016–present
At-Large	Kristen L. Mello	2020–present
At-Large	Brent B. Bean II	2002–2007, 2010–present
At-Large	Cindy C. Harris	2014–present
At-Large	Daniel J. Allie	2014–present
At-Large	David A. Flaherty	2010–present
At-Large	James R. Adams	2004–2009, 2012–2015, 2020–present
At-Large	Richard K. Sullivan, Jr.	1990–1993, 2020–present

The current city council president is Brent Bean II.

Voter Registration and Party Enrollment as of October 26, 2024
Party	Number of Voters	Percentage
Democratic	5,036	20.56%
Republican	4,515	18.43%
Independent	14,765	60.28%
Libertarian	117	0.4%
Green-Rainbow	60	0.24%
Total	24,493	100%

While there are more registered Democrats than Republicans, many Independents vote Republican.

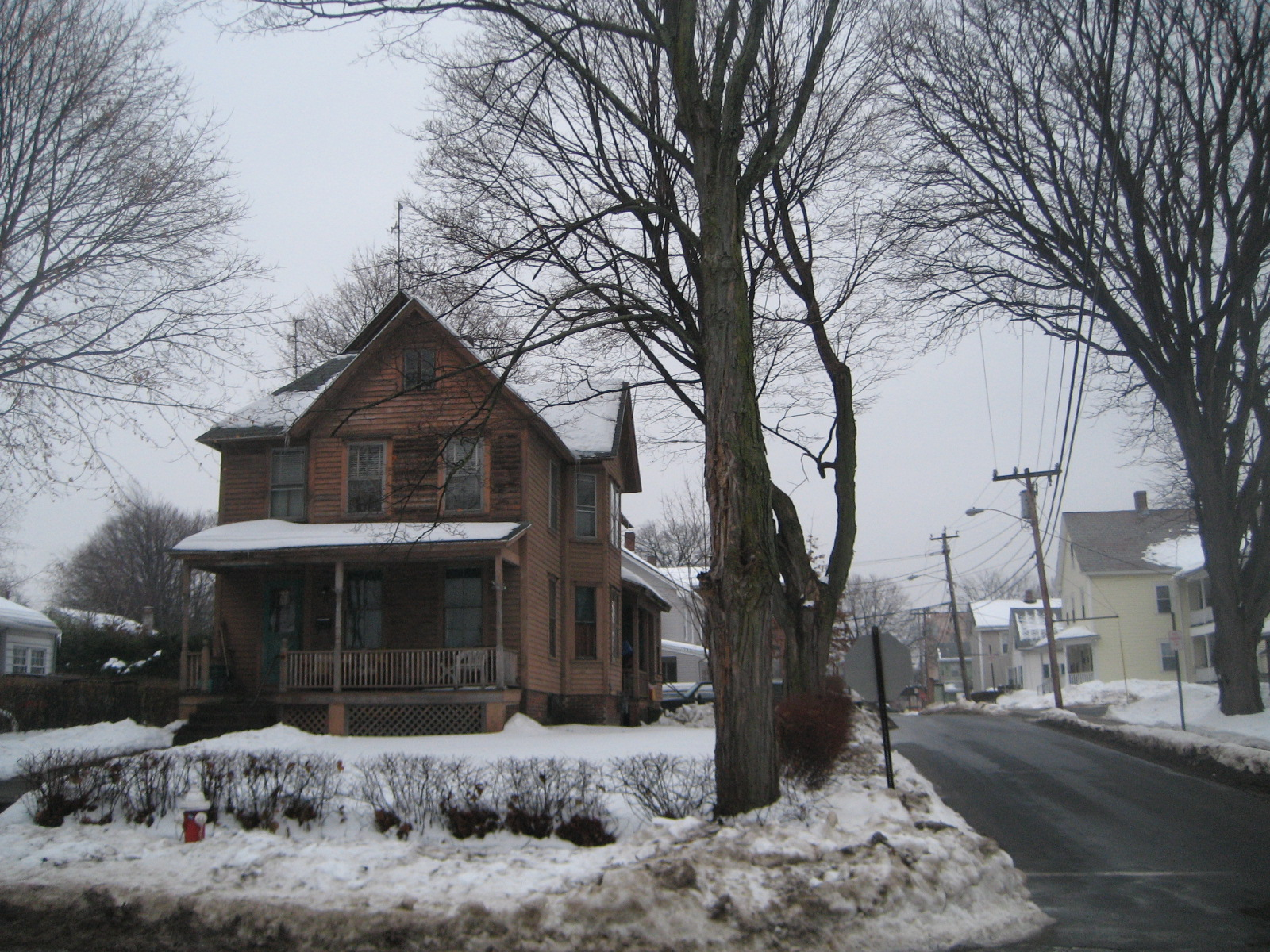
A snow-covered residential neighborhood in Westfield.

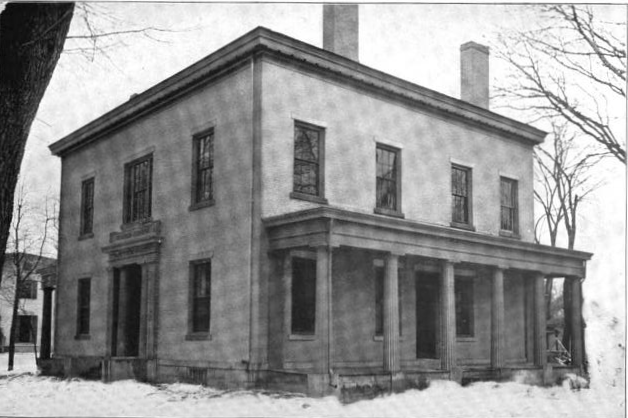
Westfield public library, 1899

== Public safety ==
=== Crime ===
According to NeighborhoodScout in 2021, violent crime in Westfield such as armed robbery, aggravated assault, rape, and murder occurs at a rate of 1 in every 477, and property crime such as larceny theft, burglary, motor vehicle theft, and arson occurs at a rate of 1 in every 119. The chance of being a victim of crime in Westfield is 1 in 95.

== Arts and culture ==
=== Points of interest ===
- Amelia Park Ice Rink and Memorial Garden
- Stanley Park of Westfield
- The Metacomet-Monadnock Trail
- East Mountain
- United States Whip Company Complex
- Columbia Greenway Rail Trail

== Education ==
Westfield's public school system consists of one preschool, five elementary schools, an intermediate school, a middle school, and two high schools. The public school enrollment for the 2024-25 school year was 4,772. The student-teacher ratio for Westfield Public Schools is 11.48. The budget for Westfield Public Schools FY26 is $75,566,339. Westfield is also home to three private schools, one being a school for special education.

In April of 2023, construction started for a brand new elementary school named Westfield River Elementary School which would replace both Franklin Avenue Elementary School and Abner Gibbs Elementary School. The new elementary school opened on January 6th, 2025.

=== Preschools ===
- Fort Meadow Early Childhood Center
- Westfield Area Head Start. Head Start is no longer referenced on the Westfield Public Schools' website.

=== Elementary schools ===
- Highland Elementary School
- Munger Hill Elementary School
- Paper Mill Elementary School
- Southampton Road Elementary School
- Westfield River Elementary School

Franklin Avenue Elementary School and Abner Gibbs Elementary School were closed and replaced by Westfield River Elementary School. They are no longer referenced on the Westfield Public Schools' website.

=== Intermediate schools ===
- Westfield Intermediate School (formerly North Middle School)

=== Middle schools ===
- Westfield Middle School (formerly South Middle School)

=== High schools ===
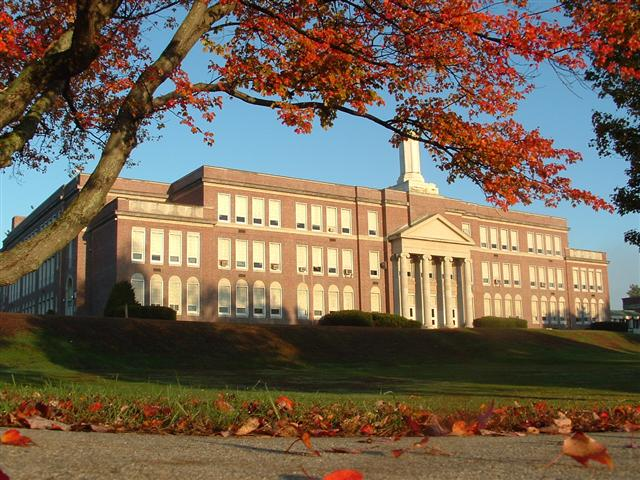
Westfield Technical Academy, upper campus

- Westfield High School
- Westfield Technical Academy

=== Private schools ===
- St. Mary's Parish School (PreK-8)
- St. Mary's High School
- White Oak School

=== Higher education ===
The city is home to Westfield State University.

== Library ==
The Westfield Athenaeum is a free library that is open to the public. It is located in Westfield, Massachusetts and is part of the CW MARS consortium. The library was incorporated by an act of the Massachusetts Legislature, Chapter 88, in 1864.

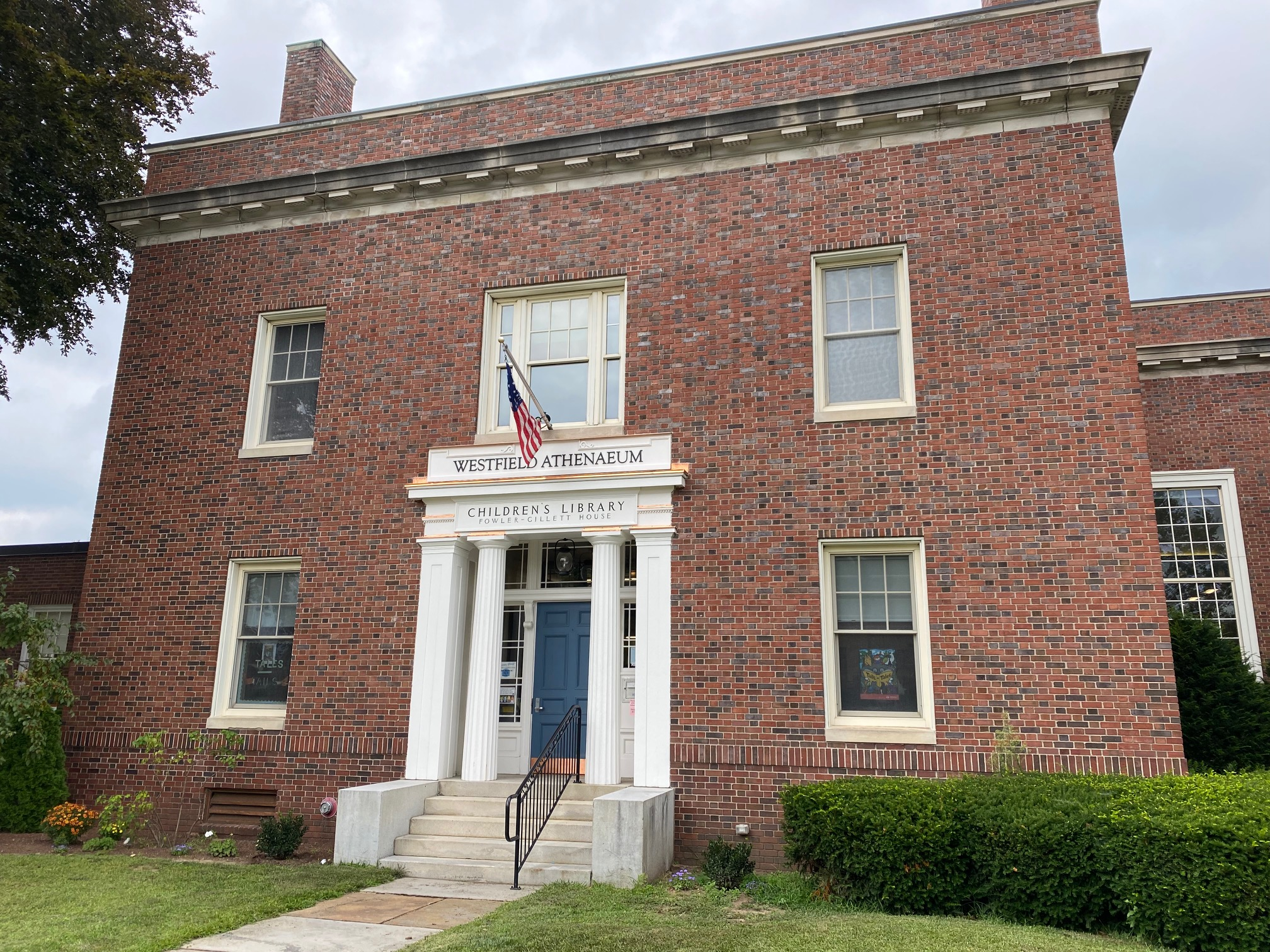
Westfield Athenaeum Children's Library Entrance

The Westfield Athenaeum opened at 26 Main Street on January 1, 1868, with an annual membership fee of $2. In 1895, it became free to Westfield residents. In 1899, the library was moved and a new building was dedicated at 6 Elm Street, the former home of James Fowler.

The Athenaeum is a non-profit organization, governed by a board of directors. Its mission is to "enrich the community of Westfield by providing open access to educational, cultural, recreational and informational resources and programs."

In fiscal year 2008, the city of Westfield spent 0.87% ($811,000) of its budget on its public library—approximately $19 per person, per year ($25.04 adjusted for inflation to 2022).

== Healthcare ==
There are two main hospitals in Westfield, Baystate Noble Hospital and Western Massachusetts Hospital.

=== Baystate Noble Hospital ===
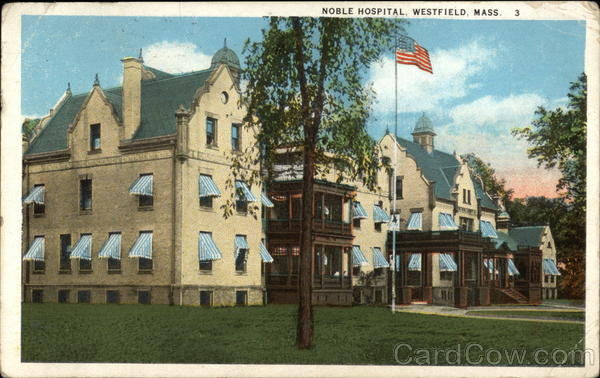
Early Photograph of Noble Hospital in 1905

Baystate Noble Hospital is an acute-care community hospital with approximately 65 to 85 licensed beds. It is part of the Baystate Health Network, the largest healthcare system in western Massachusetts. Baystate Noble Hospital was first established as Noble Hospital in 1893 with 20 beds, funded by Reuben Noble. A new building was opened in 1958. In 2015, Noble Hospital joined Baystate Health, becoming Baystate Noble Hospital. It is located on 115 West Silver Street in Westfield.

=== Western Massachusetts Hospital ===
Western Massachusetts Hospital is an 87-bed, long-term acute medical and specialty care hospital operated by the Commonwealth of Massachusetts Department of Public Health, located at 91 East Mountain Road. Western Massachusetts Hospital is the only public hospital serving the western Massachusetts region.

=== Pediatrics ===
Westfield Pediatrics and Pediatric Associates of Hampden County are two providers for pediatric care in Westfield.

== Media ==
- The Westfield News Group LLC., publishers of The Westfield News, PennySaver, The Longmeadow News and The Enfield Press

== Transportation ==
=== Major highways ===
The Massachusetts Turnpike crosses Westfield just north of Westfield Center. The "Mass Pike" is part of Interstate 90 extending east to Boston and west to Albany and across the United States to Seattle. About 3 miles (5 km) east of Westfield, the turnpike intersects Interstate 91 which generally follows the Connecticut River Valley south to Springfield, Hartford and New Haven or north to Canada (Quebec).

Westfield's main north–south thoroughfare is U.S. 202/Route 10, which includes parts of Southwick Road, S. Maple Street, W. Silver Street, Pleasant Street, Court Street, Broad Street, Elm Street, and Southampton Road. At the intersection of Southampton Road and North Road, Route 10 continues on Southampton Road toward Southampton while U.S. 202 follows North Road toward Holyoke.

Apart from limited-access I-90, the main east–west thoroughfare is U.S. 20, which includes parts of Russell Road, Franklin Street, Elm Street, Main Street, and Springfield Road. Route 187 also ends in Westfield. Other main roads include Western Avenue, Granville Road, Union Street, and Montgomery Road. East Mountain Road is the longest road in Westfield. In November 2016, Massachusetts Governor Charlie Baker announced a $1.93 million grant to the city for upgrades to its segment of U.S. Route 20.

==== Great River Bridge project ====
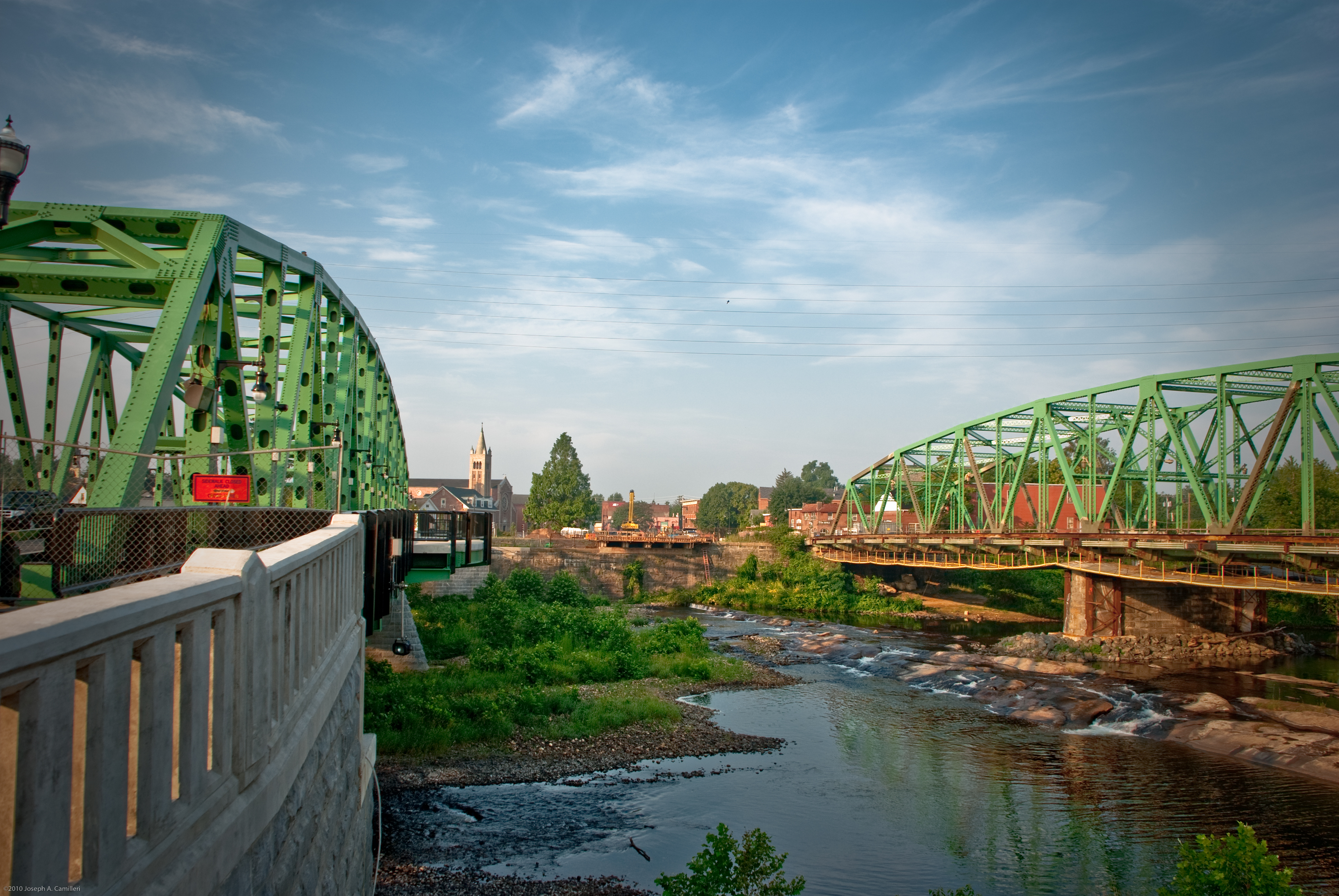
Westfield's Great River Bridge project under construction, July 2010

A notable choke point for north–south travel is the Great River Bridge, commonly known as the "Green Bridge", over the Westfield River. This is a three-lane through truss bridge. As of August 2007, there was an active project to create a second bridge just to the east (downstream). The new bridge is a similar through-truss bridge with two spans totaling 368 feet (112.2 m). After the second bridge was completed, the existing bridge was refurbished; each bridge now carries traffic in one direction. Blessed Sacrament Church on North Elm Street was torn down for this project to start. The church was reconstructed on Holyoke Road and was finished in October 2009. The new bridge opened for traffic and the old one was closed for renovations on August 18, 2009. The old bridge reopened in July 2011, with each bridge carrying traffic in one direction.

=== Rail ===
Westfield is at the junction of the former east–west Boston and Albany Railroad and a former north–south spur of the New York, New Haven and Hartford Railroad (now a rail trail south of the junction). The town last had eastbound passenger service in 1954, local Albany, New York – Boston, Massachusetts service operated by the New York Central Railroad; and Westfield last had local westbound service in 1953. But Pioneer Valley Railroad, a short line, and CSX, provide freight service. More than 35 motor freight carriers with nearby terminals provide competitive freight service locally and to all distant points. CTrail's Hartford Line, as well as Amtrak's Lake Shore Limited, Vermonter and Hartford Line continue to operate in Springfield, Massachusetts, 9.6 miles to the east.

The proposed East-West Passenger Rail service connecting Boston and Pittsfield via Worcester and Springfield would run through Westfield. As of May 2023, no formal plans exist to establish a station in the city, though local officials have expressed interest in doing so.

=== Bus ===
The city is presently served by multiple Pioneer Valley Transit Authority (PVTA) bus routes:

- R10: Westfield / Westfield State University / West Springfield via Route 20
  - Provides service between Westfield and Springfield via Route 20 and West Springfield.
  - Connects with many other public transit services at Springfield Union Station:
    - Most Springfield-area PVTA routes, for service within Springfield and nearby communities.
    - Amtrak Northeast Regional, Lake Shore Limited, Hartford Line, Valley Flyer, and Vermonter passenger rail service.
    - Peter Pan and Greyhound intercity bus service.
    - Hartford Line, a regional rail service to Hartford and New Haven, CT operated by CTrail.
- B23: Holyoke / Westfield via Holyoke Community College
  - Provides service between Westfield Center and Holyoke Transportation Center via Holyoke Community College.

=== Air ===
Westfield-Barnes Regional Airport in Westfield has charter passenger services.

Bradley International Airport at Windsor Locks, Connecticut, 18 miles (29 km) to the south, has scheduled flights by most airlines.

== Notable people ==
- Edward Bancroft (1744–1821), physician and spy in the American Revolution
- Lou Barlow (born 1966), musician and songwriter
- Kacey Bellamy (born 1987), 2010 Winter Olympics skating medalist
- Sybil Moseley Bingham (1792–1848) missionary in Hawaiian Islands
- Emma Helen Blair (1851–1911) writer and editor who attended high school in town
- Joseph Buell Ely (1881–1956), 52nd Governor of Massachusetts
- Alice Burke (1892 – 1974) First woman elected to a mayoral position in New England
- Asahel Bush (1824–1913), printer and publisher of the Oregon Statesman newspaper; His estate is preserved as Bush's Pasture Park
- Richard Falley Jr. (1740–1808) an ensign and armorer during the American Revolutionary War
- Ray Fitzgerald (1904–1977), baseball player who died in town
- James Fowler (1789–1873), state politician
- Frederick H. Gillett (1851–1935), Speaker of the U.S. House of Representatives
- Manuel Gonzales (1913–1993), comics artist
- James H. Gray Sr. (1916–1986), Georgia politician
- Ferdinand Vandeveer Hayden (1829–1887) pioneering geologist
- Thomas Ingersoll (1749–1812), for whom Ingersoll, Ontario is named
- Neil Jenney, artist
- William Allen Johnson, organ builder; Johnson Organs
- Jackie French Koller, author and painter
- Walt Kowalczyk (born 1935), football player
- Jesse Leach, rock singer and musician
- Grey Lock (1670–1750), Abenaki warrior chieftain
- Jim Matheos (born 1962), guitarist in Fates Warning
- Mary L. Moreland (1859–1918), minister, suffragist, author
- Gilbert Clifford Noble (1860–1936), Founder of Barnes and Noble Book Stores
- Ralph E. Van Norstrand, Speaker of the Connecticut House of Representatives, 1985–1987
- John J. O'Connor, artist
- Don Pardo, longtime Saturday Night Live announcer
- Gorham Parks, U.S. politician
- Rufus Parks, Wisconsin politician
- Dale Quarterley, racecar driver
- Frederic Rzewski, composer
- William Shepard, Revolutionary War general
- Nettie Stevens, early geneticist who discovered chromosomes determined sex
- Walter Scott Story (1879–1955), author
- Clara Harrison Stranahan (1831–1905), author; founder of Barnard College
- Rick Sullivan, politician
- Edward Taylor (c. 1642–1729) poet, physician, and pastor
- Adonis Terry (1864–1915), baseball player
- Alfred Topliff (1799–1879), Wisconsin State Assemblyman and surveyor
- Mark Trafton, U.S. congressman
- Daniel P. Trant, NBA player (Boston Celtics), killed on September 11, 2001 in the World Trade Center attack

=== Notable bands from Westfield ===
- Killswitch Engage, metalcore band
- Outpatients, hardcore/metal band
- Sebadoh, indie rock band
- Within the Ruins, deathcore band
- Deep Wound, hardcore punk band
- The Prozacs, pop punk band
