= Alice Burke (politician) =

American politician (1892–1974)

Mayor of Westfield, Massachusetts
- In office 1940–1943
- Preceded by: Raymond H. Cowing
- Succeeded by: Arthur B. Long
- In office 1954–1955
- Preceded by: Richard Fuller
- Succeeded by: Leonard Warner
- In office 1958–1959
- Preceded by: Leonard Warner
- Succeeded by: John D. O'Connor

Personal details
- Born: June 19, 1892 Whitinsville, Massachusetts
- Died: May 14, 1974 (aged 81) Springfield, Massachusetts
- Resting place: Saint Marys Cemetery, Westfield, Massachusetts
- Party: Democratic
- Spouse: William Thomas Burke (1922–1961; his death)
- Education: Fitchburg Normal School
- Occupation: Teacher, politician

Alice Driscoll Burke (June 19, 1892 – May 14, 1974) was an American politician who was the mayor of Westfield, Massachusetts, from 1940 to 1943, 1954 to 1955, and 1958 to 1959. She was the first woman mayor in Massachusetts and New England.

== Early life ==
Burke was born in Whitinsville, Massachusetts. Orphaned at four years old, she was then raised by her paternal grandparents. She graduated from Northbridge High School and Fitchburg Normal School. She was a teacher in Hampden County, Massachusetts, for 20 years before entering politics. During this time (Mid to late 1910's) she was the first teacher in Westfield's Americanization program which taught immigrants about US history, Government, and values to prepare for their citizenship test.

== Political career ==
In 1933, the Westfield School Committee adopted a policy of employing only unmarried female teachers and fired Burke from her job as a sixth-grade teacher. That fall, she was elected to the Westfield School Committee by four votes. In 1935, she was a finalist for mayor of Westfield, but was ruled ineligible because of an ordinance preventing individuals who were receiving a salary from the city from running for mayor (Burke was paid as a member of the school committee). She was eligible to run in 1937, but lost to incumbent Raymond H. Cowing by 561 votes. In 1939, she defeated Cowing 3637 votes to 3510. She was reelected in 1941, but lost to city councilor Arthur B. Long in 1943. In 1944, she was an unsuccessful candidate for the Massachusetts Senate in the Hampden, Hampshire, and Berkshire district, losing to Republican Ralph Lerche. She was a finalist for mayor in 1949 and 1951, but lost in the runoff election both times. Her 1953 campaign was a success, but she went on to lose reelection in 1955 to Leonard Warner. In 1957, she defeated Warner in a rematch. Her third term ended as quickly as her second, though, as she lost to John D. O'Connor. Her next attempts to regain the mayoralty failed as she lost to O'Connor in 1961 and Harold Martin in 1963 and 1965.

From 1968 to 1973, Burke was an at-large member of the Westfield city council.

== The Flood of 1955 and subsequent election ==
While campaigning for re-election at the end of her third mayoral term, Alice Burke was confronted by the twin hurricanes of Diane and Connie. The storms brought over two feet of rain to the region and caused severe damage across Westfield. Though casualties were minimal, the flooding collapsed dams, breached levees, and destroyed homes, roads, and businesses. In the weeks leading up to the disaster, Burke had been publicly criticized by City Councilman Samuel Wise for depleting city reserves, warning that the city would have little left in the event of an emergency. The timing of the flood reinforced these concerns, and the financial strain it caused became a central issue in the election. Burke was defeated by Leonard Warner in the 1955 race, receiving less than 42 percent of the vote.

Burke died on May 14, 1974, in Springfield, Massachusetts. She was 81 years old.
