= Westfield High School (Massachusetts) =

Coordinates: 42.1464°N 72.7536°W

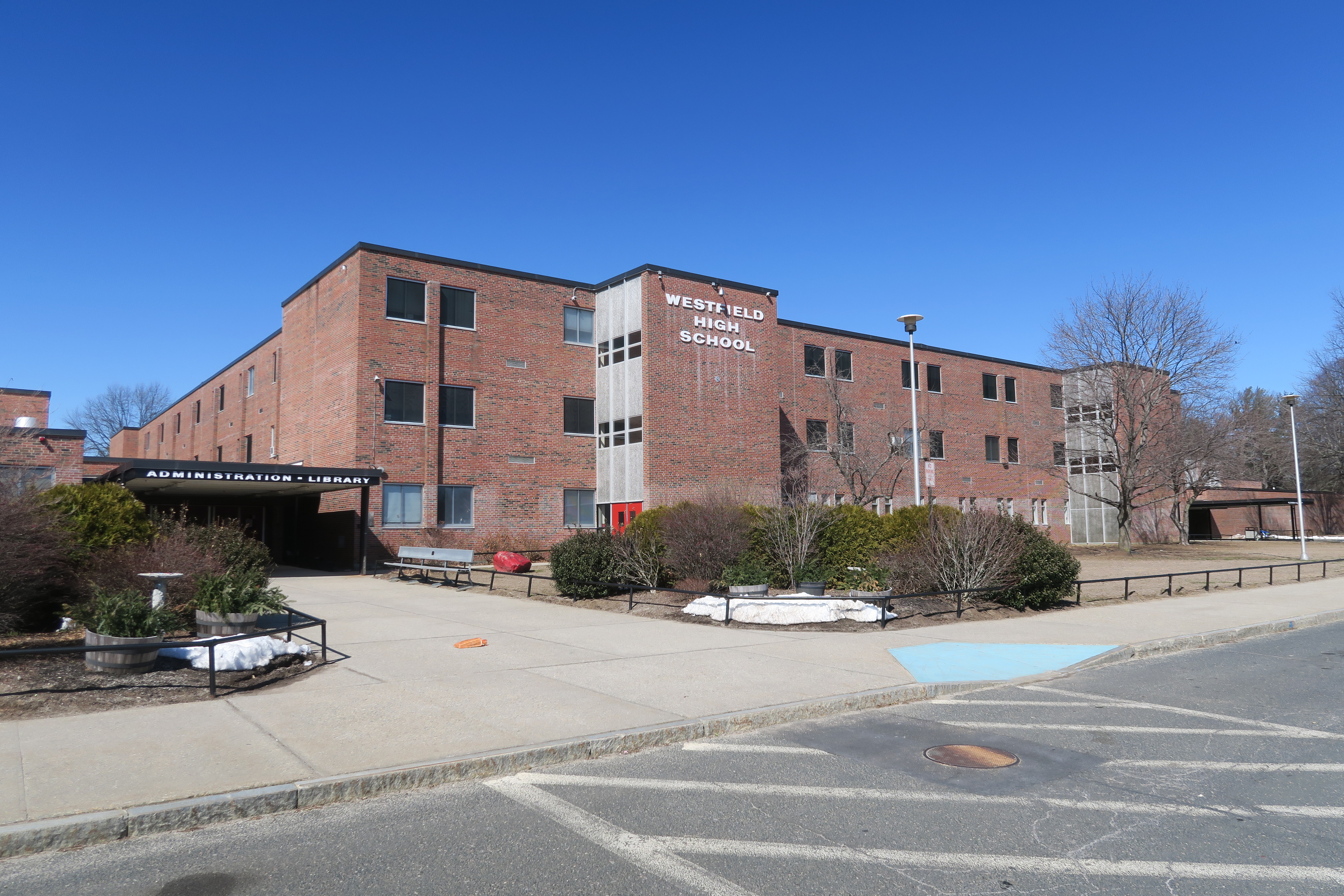
- Westfield High School

Location
- 177 Montgomery Rd; Westfield, Massachusetts 01085; United States

Information
- Type: Public; High school Open enrollment
- Established: 1855
- Principal: Charles Jendrysik
- Teaching staff: 82.71 (FTE)
- Grades: 9-12
- Enrollment: 1,006 (2023-2024)
- Student to teacher ratio: 12.16
- Colors: Red and black
- Team name: Bombers
- Newspaper: The Bomber Blaze
- Website: Official website

Westfield High School (Westfield, Massachusetts) is a public high school located in Westfield, Massachusetts, United States founded in 1855. It serves as the public high school for students in grades 9 through 12, and has a student enrollment of 1,269 (2016–17).

== Notable alumni ==
- Lou Barlow, musician of the band Dinosaur Jr.
- Alice Mary Dowd (1855–1943), educator, author
- Walt Kowalczyk, former NFL player
- Dan Trant, drafted by the Boston Celtics before being killed in the September 11 attacks
- Joel Stroetzel, musician of the band Killswitch Engage
- John O'Connor, visual artist in the collection of the Museum of Modern Art and The Whitney Museum
- Sabrina Tavernise, journalist for the New York Times.
