= John J. O'Connor (artist) =

American artist (born 1972)

John Jerome O’Connor
- Born: 1972 (age 53–54); Westfield, Massachusetts, United States
- Education: Westfield State College, Westfield, MA; Pratt Institute, Brooklyn, NY; Skowhegan School of Painting and Sculpture, Skowhegan, ME
- Known for: Painting, Drawing, Installation

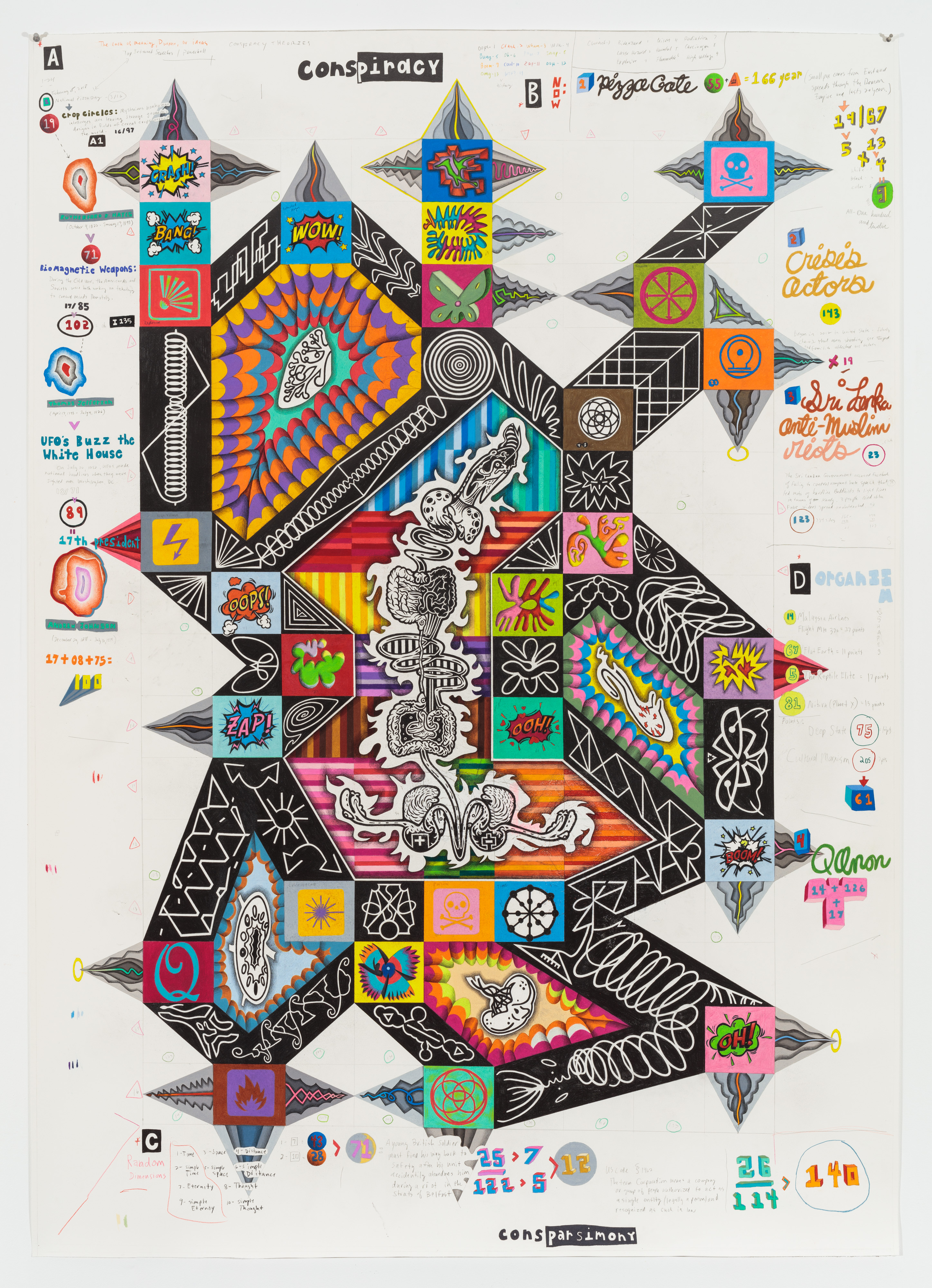
Conspiracy: Faker Sent INN, 69.25 x 49.25 inches, colored pencil and graphite on paper

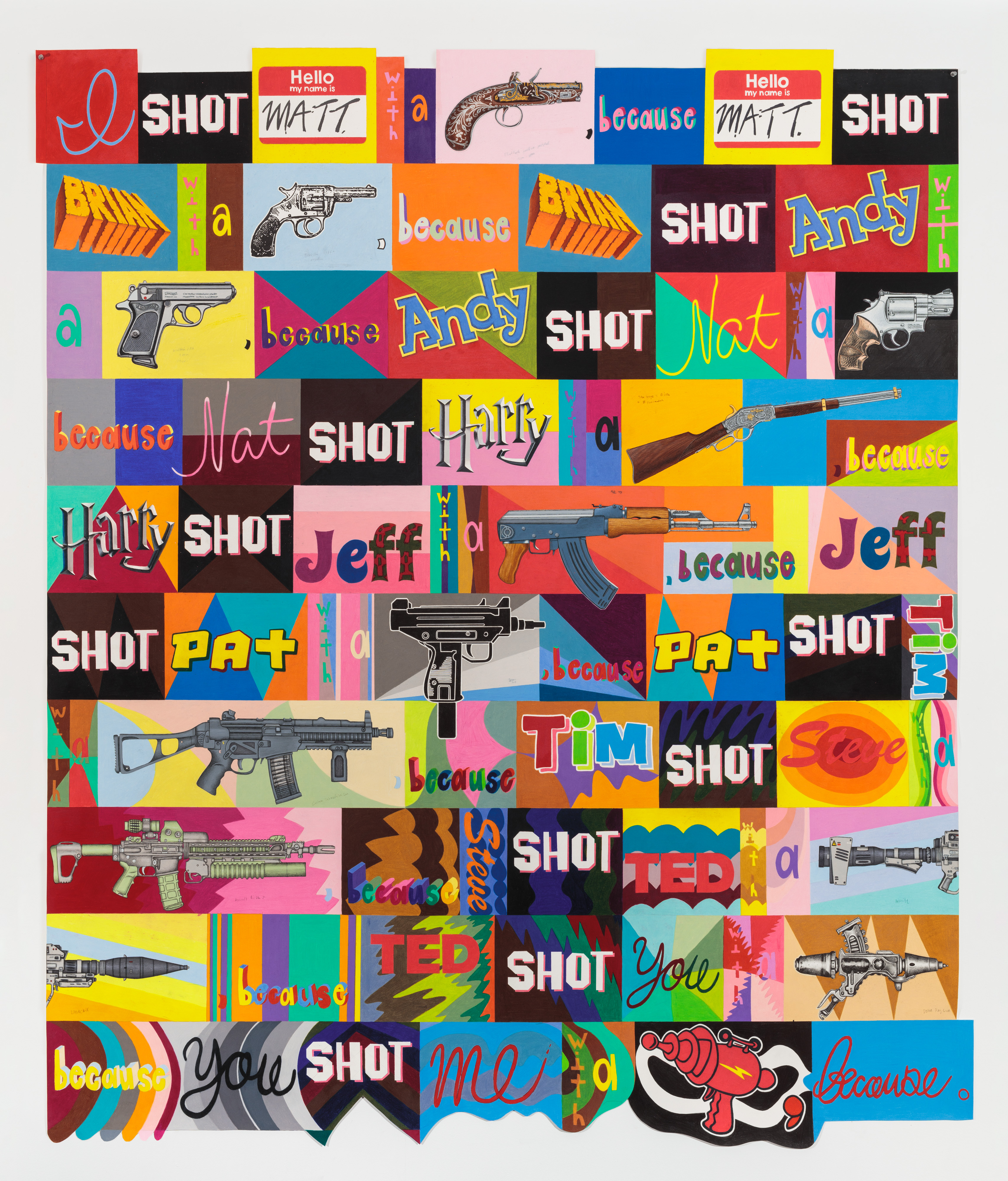
I Shot, Colored pencil and graphite on paper, 82.25 x 70.25 inches, 2019

John Jerome O’Connor (born 1972) is an American artist primarily known for his large-scale, labor-intensive, abstract works on paper. In these works, O'Connor transforms information through idiosyncratic processes, creating equally idiosyncratic abstract shapes, forms, and patterns. His works draw on relationships between spoken and written language, psychological fallacies, self-experimentation, humor, mathematics, emergence in science and anthropology, and climate prediction and error.

O'Connor's work maps transformations from one known state to another—whether sudden and dramatic, like a political revolution that upends an entire belief structure instantaneously, or an earthquake that opens the ground in seconds. He is equally intrigued by more subtle, almost imperceptible changes that occur incrementally. In these phase transitions, the precise moment of transformation is elusive, as when rain turns to ice, or when a person shifts from believer to an agnostic.

O'Connor explores these phenomena across various dimensions — natural, mathematical, social, psychological, and political. His work seeks to visually capture the specific, often invisible moments of transformation, from the mundane to the monumental.

== Early work ==
Influenced by the art and music of John Cage while studying at Pratt Institute, O'Connor created abstractions based on chance operations. In 1998 he made a series of small drawings by dipping jazz brushes in ink before playing them directly on paper. Each drawing represented a specific beat per minute played for a specific duration. In the late 1990s, O'Connor begin to explore systematic approaches to art making through drawing. These works were diagrammatic and process based. Though the compositions were simpler in these and other experimental works made in this period, O'Connor was laying the basic groundwork for his future methods and defining his unique conceptual framework, which he expanded at the Skowhegan School of Painting and Sculpture in 2000.

== Recent work ==
O'Connor's central works are large-scale drawings on paper made with colored pencil, and graphite. He also makes sculpture, photography, collage, and digital art. O'Connor is a member of the artist collective NonCoreProjector. Their project "Verbolect" is a multi-media work that explores the relationship between AI and human language, emotion, endurance, and computer-based introspection. Alongside his studio practice, he teaches at Sarah Lawrence College, where his role as an educator reflects his interest in process, systems, and critical thinking. In 2025, O'Connor's work was featured in 'A Fly in the Array,' a pavilion curated by Brian Zeeger for The Wrong Biennale. The addition of O'Connor in the pavilion showcases his continued exploration of the intersection between complex data systems and visual art.

== Drawings ==
O'Connor's drawings are large-scale, detailed, meticulous pieces on paper that bridge text and language with abstraction and pattern. With their integration of information and language with shapes, forms, logos, pop imagery, and patterns, O'Connor's works link the process of looking with that of reading, decoding, and interpreting.

O'Connor's large-scale drawings often contain abstract forms made from multi-colored fields of text and patterns which are partly derived from combining simple logical processes (such as alphabet codes) and partly from intuitive reactions, described as his "trademark hallucinatory style". These processes often reveal unlikely connections between seemingly disparate data often with humorous or absurdist results. Information used in O'Connor's work include conversations the artist has had with Cleverbot, charts on male pattern baldness, chess game patterns, sunspot fluctuations, temperature prediction error, the prophesies of Nostradamus, census reports, storytelling as transmutation, memory fallacies, paradox of the heap, the Linda Problem, key smash patterns, escalation of violence, conspiracy theories, Hollywood filmmaking narratives, consumer drug effects, social class cycles, theories of time perception, rhyming mutations / Mondegreens, etc..

Patterns that emerge from linking these disparate data are often a structural conduit for his unique logic and subsequent aesthetic. He fuses the information that he's investigating within the patterns and forms he draws as a means of collapsing the space between the generation of a thought, its gradual manifestation, and final conclusion.

== Butterflies ==
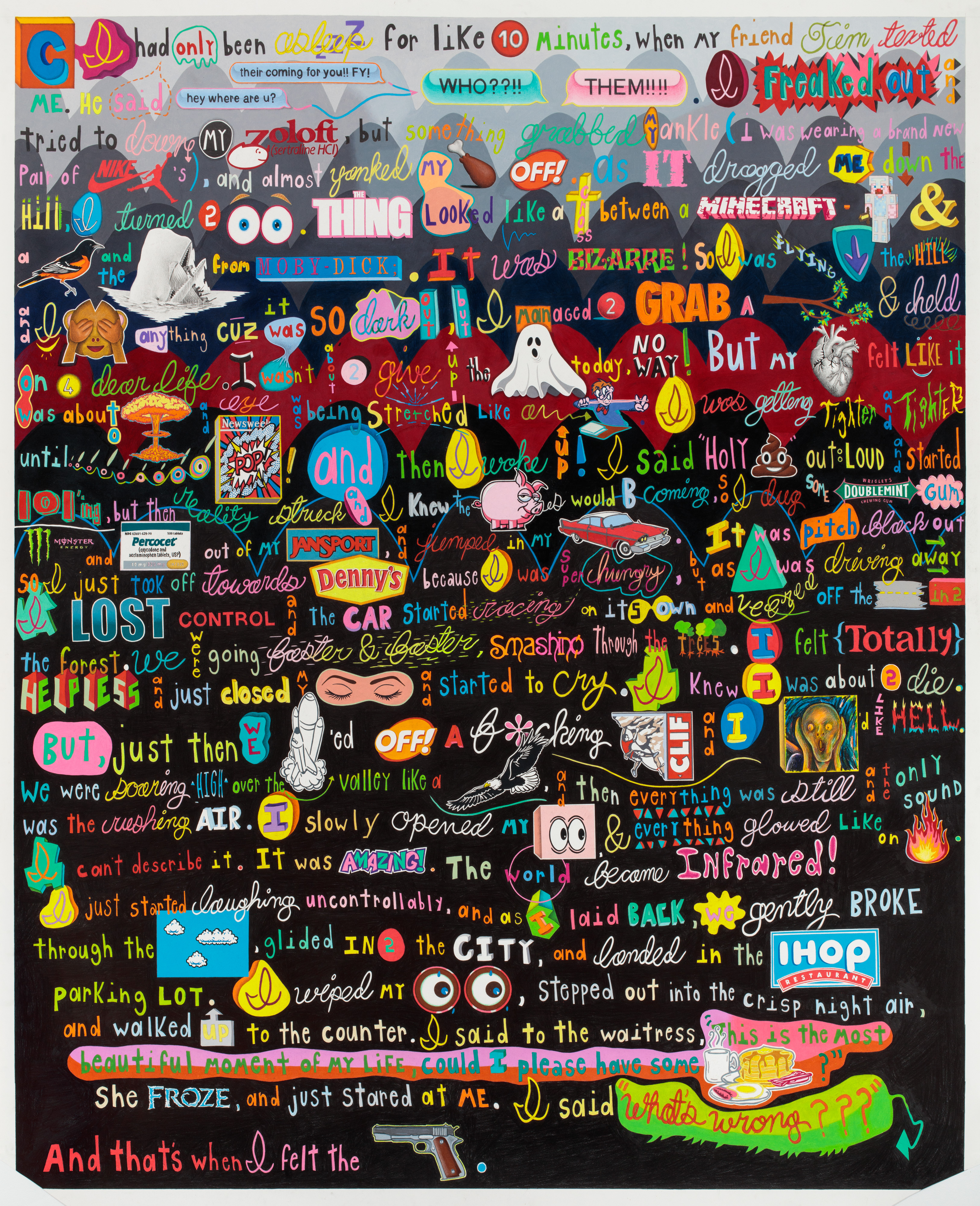
Charlie (Day 3), 86 X 70 inches, colored pencil and graphite on paper

O'Connor's recent series of 26 interconnected drawings are large, pictogram-like works that depict, through text and graphic images, the lifespan of a working class male as he encountered myriad obstacles, both real and imagined. These works reference Hollywood filmmaking, consumer drug effects, video game spaces, social class, popular music, dream imagery, theories of time perception, literary fiction, advertisement logos, etc. In a recent series of photographic collages, O'Connor fused close up NASA images of sunspots onto the surface of his face, creating, disturbing composite portraits that investigated the relationship between celestial patterns and those of the human being on Earth. Overall, many of O'Connor's recent works explore the moment when an individual's internal intentions and desires are affected, opposed, or concretely influenced by a more powerful external force.

== Small works ==
O'Connor also make faster, smaller scaled collages, sculptures, and self-portraits. The time discrepancy in this aspect of his studio practice is intentional and undergirds his exploration of the intersection points between the political, scientific, mathematical, linguistic, and personal. For instance in Recursevolution, John J. O’Connor explores how physical matter, life, and consciousness evolve through repeating cycles. He connects biological evolution, the structure of the sun, and artificial intelligence into one system that expands and contracts over time. The drawing is built in layers that move inward, showing how awareness grows from simple matter into complex thought. O’Connor treats the artwork itself as a system, where each layer affects the next, mirroring how evolution and intelligence continuously reshape themselves.
