= William Allen Johnson =

American pipe organ builder (1816–1901)

William Allen Johnson (October 27, 1816 – January 20, 1901) of Westfield, Massachusetts, US, was a builder of pipe organs during the later half of the nineteenth century. (See Johnson Organs). Previously, Johnson had operated a successful construction company in Westfield, where some of his buildings may still be seen.

== Early life ==
William was born in Nassau (village), New York on October 27, 1816, to William R. and Eliza Allen Johnson, the first of eight children. In 1819, the Johnson family moved to Hawley, Franklin County, Massachusetts, then shortly afterward to Westfield, Massachusetts, following William's father's trade as a millwright

Young Johnson first attended a private school, then the public school. His formal education ended at the age of thirteen when he began to earn his own living. After working on a farm for two years, he worked in a glue factory, then at a whip factory in Westfield which is still known as "Whip City". In September 1834 Johnson apprenticed himself to a mason for a term of three years and three months. During this period, he worked in a cotton mill in Chicopee, Massachusetts during wintertimes. At the end of his apprenticeship, Johnson formed his own construction business, doing considerable work in the Westfield area.

In November 1839, William A Johnson married Mary Ann Douglas. Mary Johnson went on to become well known as a talented artist. Some of her paintings of the Westfield River Valley and the surrounding hills can be seen at the Westfield Athenaeum.

== The William A. Johnson / Johnson and Son Organ Co. ==
In 1843, Johnson's construction firm was chosen to build a new building for his own church, the Westfield Methodist Church. As the building was being completed, an organ builder arrived to install a pipe organ. When asked about the availability of a worker to help set up the organ, Mr. Johnson readily applied for the job. During the installation of this organ, William became interested in the art of organ building.

During a slack period of construction work in the winter of 1843–1844, Mr. Johnson decided to build a small parlor organ. It was of just one rank or set of pipes, had one keyboard, and no pedalboard. By successfully completing this project, he proved to himself that he had the skills necessary for the building of pipe organs. Continuing this practice, Johnson built six parlor organs of increased size during the next three winters. In 1847, he decided to accept only construction contracts that could be finished by the fall so that he could close his construction business and devote all of his time to the building of pipe organs.

Johnson soon assembled a team of skilled craftsmen to augment his own considerable skills. The Johnson Organ Company became one of the most respected organ firms of the country. In 1871, following a disastrous fire and the inclusion of Johnson's son William H. Johnson into the firm, the company became known as "Johnson and Son". The firm built a total of 860 tracker action pipe organs throughout the United States and in Canada and Bermuda before it ceased operations in 1898

William A. Johnson died on January 20, 1901, at the age of 84.

== References / Citations ==
all information in this article comes from this book:

- Elsworth, John Van Varick. The Johnson Organs, 1984, published by The Boston Organ Club of the Organ Historical Society.
