= Closer (baseball) =

Baseball relief pitcher who specializes in finishing close games

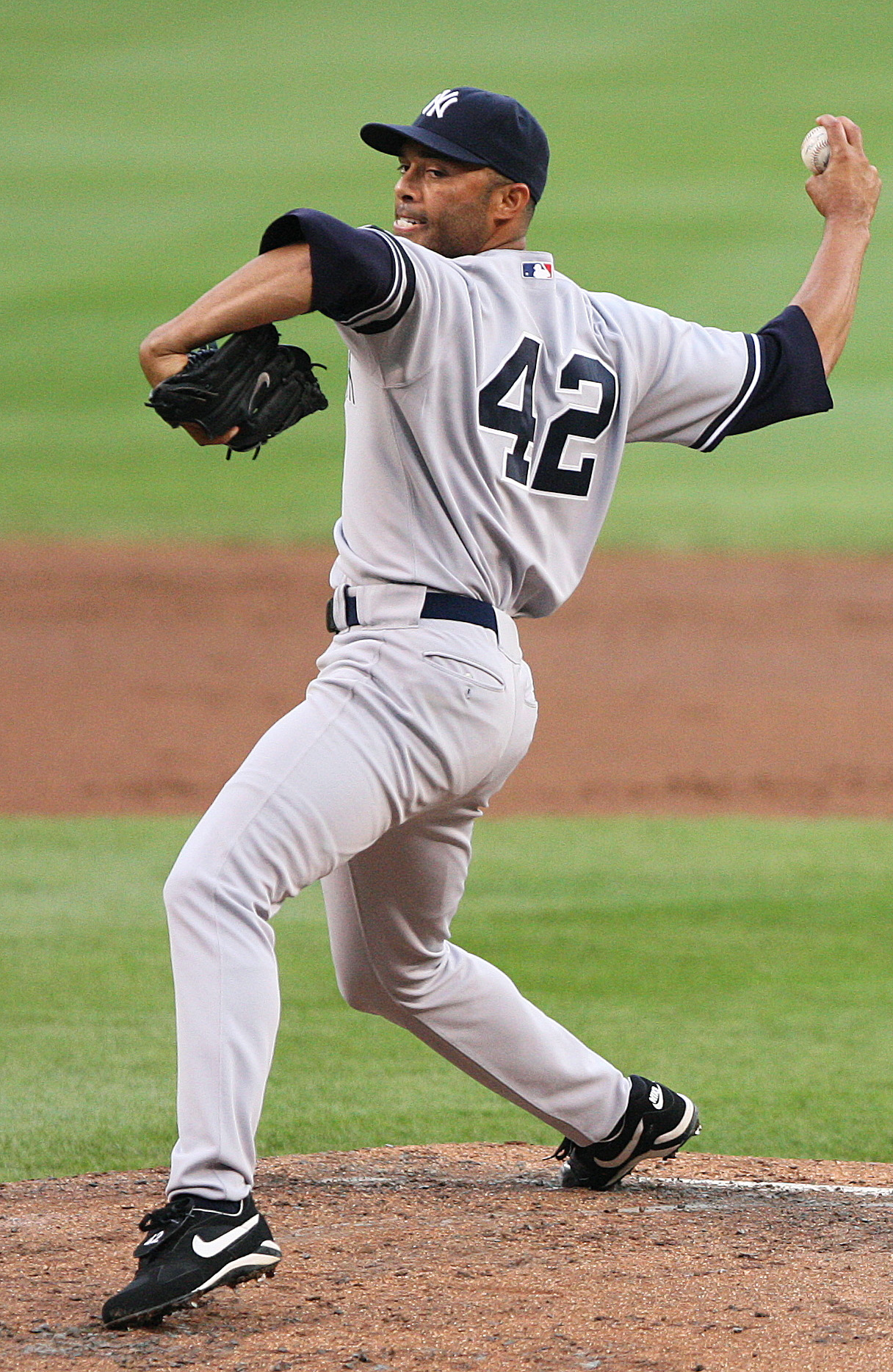
Former Yankees closer Mariano Rivera, one of the most prominent closers in baseball history, has the most career saves of any MLB pitcher (652).

In baseball, a closing pitcher, more frequently referred to as a closer (abbreviated CL), is a relief pitcher who specializes in getting the final outs in a close game when his team is in the lead. A closer who successfully gets the final outs for their team in the final inning of a game is recorded as a save in baseball statistics. The role is often assigned to a team's best reliever. Before the 1990s, pitchers in similar roles were referred to as a fireman and stopper. Closers typically specialize in a breaking ball of some sort in order to minimize the risk of home runs late in games, and to deceive batters into swinging away from the strike zone.

In Major League Baseball (MLB), some closers have been noted for their use of entrance music when they jog out to the mound to warm up, often to excite the fans and to intimidate the at-bat. For example, the San Diego Padres of the National League (NL) played the song "Hells Bells" by AC/DC for closer Trevor Hoffman, and the New York Yankees of the American League (AL) played "Enter Sandman" by Metallica for closer Mariano Rivera.

A small number of closers have won the Cy Young Award. Nine closers have been inducted into the Baseball Hall of Fame: Dennis Eckersley, Rollie Fingers, Goose Gossage, Trevor Hoffman, Mariano Rivera, Lee Smith, Bruce Sutter, Billy Wagner, and Hoyt Wilhelm.

== Usage ==
A closer is generally a team's best reliever and designated to pitch the last few outs of games when his team is leading by a margin of three runs or fewer. Rarely does a closer enter with his team losing or in a tie game, however in the playoffs they are often brought on if it is a close game. A closer's effectiveness has traditionally been measured by the save, an official Major League Baseball (MLB) statistic since 1969. Over time, closers have become one-inning specialists typically brought in at the beginning of the ninth inning in save situations. The pressure of the last three outs of the game is often cited for the importance attributed to the ninth inning.

Closers are often the highest paid relievers on their teams, making money on par with starting pitchers. In the rare cases where a team does not have one primary pitcher dedicated to this role, mainly due to an injury or poor performance of primary closer candidates, the team is said to have a closer by committee.

== History ==
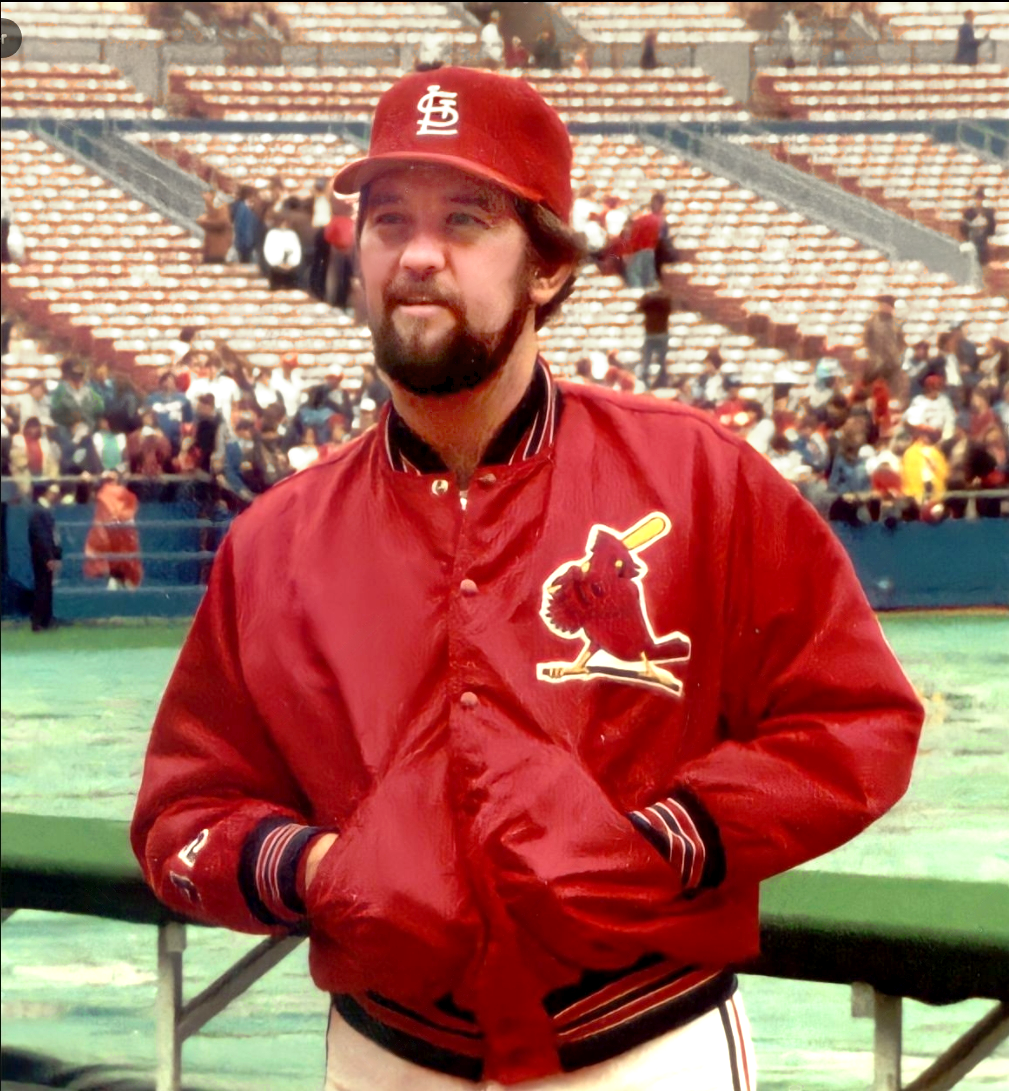
Bruce Sutter was the first pitcher to start the ninth inning in 20 percent of his career appearances.

New York Giants manager John McGraw in 1905 was one of the first to use a relief pitcher to save games. He pitched Claude Elliott in relief eight times in his ten appearances. Though saves were not an official statistic until 1969, Elliot was retroactively credited with six saves that season, a record at that time. In 1977, Chicago Cubs manager Herman Franks used Bruce Sutter almost exclusively in the eighth or ninth innings in save situations. While relievers such as Rollie Fingers and Goose Gossage were already being used mostly in save situations, Franks's use of Sutter represented an incremental change. Sutter was the first pitcher to start the ninth inning in 20 percent of his career appearances. Clay Carroll in 1972 was the first pitcher to make a third of his season's appearances in the beginning of the ninth inning, which would not be repeated until Fingers in 1982. John Franco in 1987 was the first to be used over 50 percent of the time in the beginning of the ninth in a season; he had a then-record 24 one-inning saves. Lee Smith in 1994 was the first to be used over 75 percent of the time in that situation. Using the save leader from each team in the league, the average closer made his appearances in the beginning of the ninth inning 10 percent of the time in the 1970s to almost 2/3 of the time by 2004.

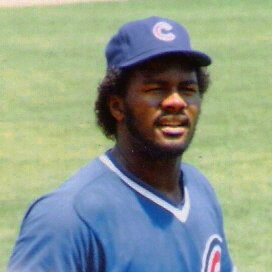
Lee Smith in 1994 was the first pitcher to start the ninth inning in over 75 percent of his appearances.

Tony La Russa while with the Oakland Athletics is frequently named as the innovator of the position, making Dennis Eckersley the first player to be used almost exclusively in ninth inning situations. La Russa explained that "[the Oakland A's would] be ahead a large number of games every week ... That's a lot of work for somebody throwing more than one inning ... Also, there was the added advantage of [Eckersley] not getting overexposed. We tried to get [him] to only face three or four batters an outing." Baseball teams often copy one another, following a strategy based on one team's success. In 1990, Bobby Thigpen set a record with 57 saves while breaking Franco's one-inning saves record with 41. Francisco Rodríguez set the current record with 54 one-inning saves in 2008.

As late as 1989, a team's ace reliever was called a fireman, coming to the rescue to "put out the fire", baseball terminology for stopping an offensive rally with runners on base. They were occasionally referred to as stoppers and closers. By the early 1990s, the top late-inning reliever was called a closer. The firemen came in whenever leads were in jeopardy, usually with men on base, and regardless of the inning and often pitching two or three innings while finishing the game. An example of this is that Goose Gossage had 17 games where he recorded at least 10 outs in his first season as a closer, including three games where he went seven innings. He pitched over 130 innings as a reliever in three different seasons. For their careers, Sutter and Gossage had more saves of at least two innings than saves where they pitched one inning or less. Fingers was the only pitcher who pitched at least three innings in more than 10 percent of his saves. The game evolved to where the best reliever was reserved for games where the team had a lead of three runs or less in the ninth inning. Mariano Rivera, considered one of the greatest closers of all time, earned only one save of seven-plus outs in his career, while Gossage logged 53. "Don't tell me [Rivera's] the best relief pitcher of all-time until he can do the same job I did. He may be the best modern closer, but you have to compare apples to apples. Do what we did", said Gossage.

== Strategy ==
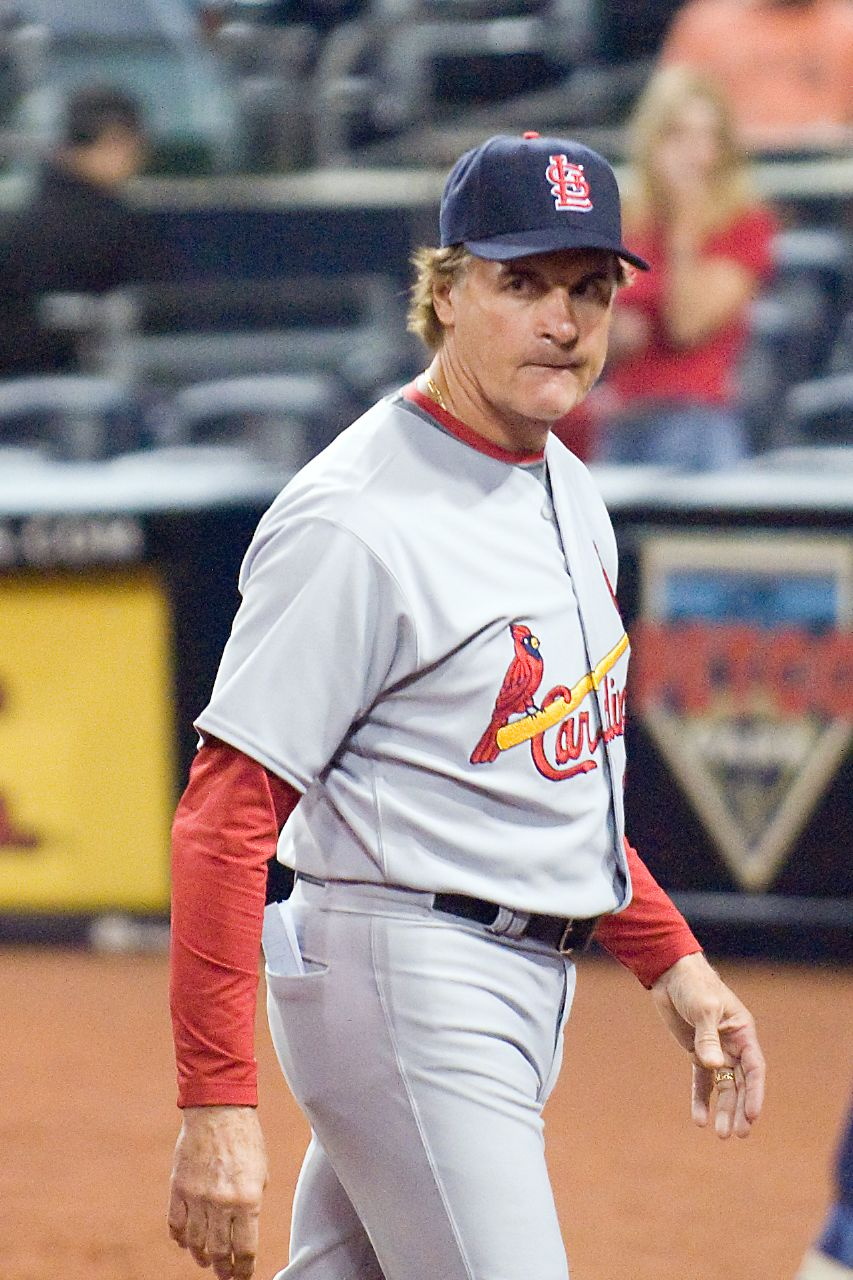
By relegating Dennis Eckersley to mostly one-inning save situations, manager Tony La Russa (pictured) was instrumental in the development of the modern closer.

ESPN.com writer Jim Caple wrote that closers' saves in the ninth "merely conclude what is usually a foregone conclusion." Dave Smith of Retrosheet researched the seasons 1930–2003 and found that the winning percentage for teams who enter the ninth inning with a lead has remained virtually unchanged over the decades. One-run leads after eight innings have been won roughly 85 percent of the time, two-run leads 94 percent of the time, and three-run leads about 96 percent of the time. Baseball Prospectus projects that teams could gain as many as four extra wins a year by focusing on bringing their ace reliever into the game earlier in more critical situations with runners on base instead of holding them out to accumulate easier ninth inning saves. In The Book: Playing the Percentages in Baseball, Tom Tango et al. wrote that there was more value to having the ace reliever enter in the eighth inning with a one- or a two-run lead instead of the ninth with a three-run lead. "Managers feel the need to please their closers—and their closers' agents—by getting them cheap saves to pad their stats and their bank accounts", wrote Caple. Tango et al. projected that using a great reliever over an average one to start the ninth with a three-run lead resulted in a two percent increase in wins, versus four percent for a two-run lead or six percent for a one-run lead. Former Baltimore Orioles manager Johnny Oates once told Jerome Holtzman, the inventor of the save statistic, that he created the ninth-inning pitcher by inventing the save. Holtzman disagreed, saying it was baseball managers who were responsible for not bringing in their top reliever when the game was on the line, in the seventh or eighth inning, which had been the practice in the past. He noted that managers' usage of closers can "abuse the pitching save ... to favor the closer."

La Russa says it is important that relievers know their roles and the situations which they will be called into a game. He added, "Sure, games can get away from you in the seventh and eighth, but those last three outs in the ninth are the toughest. You want the guy who can handle that pressure. That, to me, is most important." Oakland general manager Billy Beane said there would be too much media criticism if a pitcher other than the closer lost the game in the ninth." Managerial moves are immediately questioned with millions of fans having access to ESPN, the MLB Network, and other cable channels. Former manager Jim Fregosi said managers do not like to be second-guessed. "Even if you know the odds, it's more comfortable being wrong when you go to the closer", said Beane. He noted the incremental increase gained by a closer in a three-run save situation "is worth it because losing is so painful in that situation." Baseball announcer Chris Wheeler noted that there is pressure on managers to pitch closers in the ninth inning when they were paid big money to pitch in that role. Former general manager Pat Gillick said closers become one-inning pitchers as managers began copying the practice of having setup pitchers enter before closers. "There are just too many specialists, guys who can only pitch one inning and only pitch certain innings and throw only 20 pitches. I think most pitchers are capable of pitching more", said Gillick.

=== Criticism ===
La Russa noted that losing clubs risk their closer being under-worked, if they stick to the strategy of saving them for ninth inning situations where the team is ahead. An instance of this was Philadelphia Phillies manager Charlie Manuel, who did not call upon closer Jonathan Papelbon in high leverage situations during the 2012 season, including six games where the score was tied during the late innings, which may have cost the team seven wins by midseason. Jonah Keri suggested "fear of using pitchers in anything but the most predictable circumstances, or simple inertia, closers get used far more often in easy-to-manage, up-two, bases-empty, ninth-inning situations than they do in tie games with runners on and the game actually on the line" and said of Papelbon "unless the Phillies start using him in situations where he’s actually needed, rather than almost exclusively in spots that nearly any pitcher with a pulse can handle successfully 85–90 percent of the time, Papelbon will remain the $200,000 Aston Martin that never leaves the garage".

Some critics have noted that the 9th inning closer strategy is illogical during playoff games, especially when the club is facing elimination, and suggested that the closer should be readily inserted as a "fireman" during an earlier inning to stop a rally while the score is still close. During Games 4 and 6 of the 2010 NLCS, each a late-inning situation with the score tied, Phillies manager Charlie Manuel did not call upon closer Brad Lidge and both times the selected relief pitcher surrendered the game-winning run (Lidge came in during the ninth inning of Game 6 where he preserved the 3-2 deficit but the Phillies failed to score in the bottom of the ninth). Similarly in Games 3 and 6 of the 2010 ALCS, each where the New York Yankees were trailing by two runs during a crucial inning, manager Joe Girardi did not go to Mariano Rivera, and both times the chosen relief pitcher gave up several runs which put the game out of reach for the Yankees; ESPN's Matthew Wallace lamented that "Girardi used Rivera in the ninth inning of Game 6, with the Yankees trailing 6–1, their ship long sailed to sea".

== Hall of Fame ==
Nine pitchers who were primarily relievers have been inducted into the Baseball Hall of Fame. Hoyt Wilhelm was the first to be elected in 1985, followed by Rollie Fingers, Dennis Eckersley, Bruce Sutter, Goose Gossage, Trevor Hoffman, Lee Smith, Mariano Rivera, and Billy Wagner. (Note: Hall of Famer John Smoltz was a closer for four seasons, but is considered to have primarily been a starter.) Eckersley was the first closer in the one-inning save era to be inducted. He believed that he was inducted because he was both a starter and a reliever. "If I came up today as a closer and played 20 years, would I have made it [into the Hall of Fame]? These pitchers did the job they were supposed to do for 20 years. What else are they supposed to do?" said Eckersley. Rivera was elected in 2019 and was the first player in history to be elected unanimously by the Baseball Writers' Association of America, appearing on all 425 ballots.

== Major awards and honors won by closers ==
=== Major League Baseball ===
Award	Closer	Team	Year
Hall of Fame	Billy Wagner	Houston Astros	2025
Hall of Fame	Mariano Rivera	New York Yankees	2019
Hall of Fame	Lee Smith	Chicago Cubs	2019
Hall of Fame	Trevor Hoffman	San Diego Padres	2018
Hall of Fame	Goose Gossage	New York Yankees	2008
Hall of Fame	Bruce Sutter	St. Louis Cardinals	2006
Hall of Fame	Dennis Eckersley	Oakland Athletics	2004
Hall of Fame	Rollie Fingers	Oakland Athletics	1992
Hall of Fame	Hoyt Wilhelm	New York Giants	1985
Cy Young	Éric Gagné	Los Angeles Dodgers	2003 (NL)
Cy Young	Dennis Eckersley *	Oakland Athletics	1992 (AL)
Cy Young	Mark Davis	San Diego Padres	1989 (NL)
Cy Young	Steve Bedrosian	Philadelphia Phillies	1987 (NL)
Cy Young	Willie Hernández *	Detroit Tigers	1984 (AL)
Cy Young	Rollie Fingers *	Milwaukee Brewers	1981 (AL)
Cy Young	Bruce Sutter	Chicago Cubs	1979 (NL)
Cy Young	Sparky Lyle	New York Yankees	1977 (AL)
Cy Young	Mike Marshall	Los Angeles Dodgers	1974 (NL)

Award	Closer	Team	Year
MVP	Dennis Eckersley *	Oakland Athletics	1992 (AL)
MVP	Willie Hernández *	Detroit Tigers	1984 (AL)
MVP	Rollie Fingers *	Milwaukee Brewers	1981 (AL)
MVP	Jim Konstanty	Philadelphia Phillies	1950 (NL)
WS MVP	Mariano Rivera	New York Yankees	1999
WS MVP	John Wetteland	New York Yankees	1996
WS MVP	Rollie Fingers	Oakland Athletics	1974
WS MVP	Larry Sherry	Los Angeles Dodgers	1959
ROY	Craig Kimbrel	Atlanta Braves	2011 (NL)
ROY	Neftalí Feliz	Texas Rangers	2010 (AL)
ROY	Andrew Bailey	Oakland Athletics	2009 (AL)
ROY	Huston Street	Oakland Athletics	2005 (AL)
ROY	Kazuhiro Sasaki	Seattle Mariners	2000 (AL)
ROY	Scott Williamson	Cincinnati Reds	1999 (NL)
ROY	Gregg Olson	Baltimore Orioles	1989 (AL)
ROY	Todd Worrell	St. Louis Cardinals	1986 (NL)
ROY	Steve Howe	Los Angeles Dodgers	1980 (NL)
ROY	Butch Metzger	San Diego Padres	1976 (NL)
ROY	Joe Black	Los Angeles Dodgers	1952 (NL)
LCS MVP	Koji Uehara	Boston Red Sox	2013 (AL)
LCS MVP	Andrew Miller	Cleveland Indians	2016 (AL)
LCS MVP	Mariano Rivera	New York Yankees	2003 (AL)
LCS MVP	Rob Dibble, Randy Myers	Cincinnati Reds	1990 (NL)
LCS MVP	Dennis Eckersley	Oakland Athletics	1988 (AL)
ASG MVP	Mariano Rivera	New York Yankees	2013

* Won both the league Cy Young Award and league Most Valuable Player Award in the same year

=== Nippon Professional Baseball ===
Award	Closer	Team	Year
Meikyukai	Kazuhiro Sasaki	Whales/BayStars	2000
Meikyukai	Shingo Takatsu	Swallows	2003
Meikyukai	Hitoki Iwase	Dragons	2010
Meikyukai	Koji Uehara	Giants	2022
Meikyukai	Kyuji Fujikawa	Hanshin Tigers	2022
Meikyukai	Yoshihisa Hirano	Orix Buffaloes	2023
MVP	Dennis Sarfate	Fukuoka SoftBank Hawks	2017 (Pacific)
MVP	Kazuhiro Sasaki	BayStars	1998 (Central)
MVP	Genji Kaku	Dragons	1988 (Central)
MVP	Yutaka Enatsu	Fighters	1981 (Pacific)
MVP	Yutaka Enatsu	Carp	1979 (Central)

== See also ==
- Baseball awards § Japan
- Baseball awards § United States
