= Tom McEwen =

Tom McEwen may refer to:

- Tom McEwen (politician) (1891–1988), Canadian political candidate
- Tom McEwen (drag racer) (1937–2018), American drag racing driver
- Tom McEwen (sportswriter) (1923–2011), American sportswriter
- Tom McEwen (equestrian) (born 1991), British equestrian
