= Brenda VanLengen =

Brenda VanLengen is the primary analyst for the Big 12 Conference women's basketball package on Fox Sports and Play-by-Play announcer for ESPN and the SEC Network Monday night games. She also acts as an analyst for BTN, FSN, Westwood One, and the other regional networks. She has been a sports broadcaster on television since 1996. Outside of women's basketball, VanLengen has done play-by-play for select women's volleyball, soccer, basketball, and softball matches for the ESPN Family of Networks, BTN, FSN since 2009.

== Early life and college ==
VanLengen's athletic career began early on. VanLengen played as a three-sport athlete at Roseland High School in Roseland, Nebraska. While attending high school, VanLengen would be recognized All-State First team in volleyball and basketball. She would also be a 3-year finalist at the state track meet.

VanLengen would go on to play collegiate basketball for the Nebraska–Kearney Lopers (formerly known as Kearney State College) from 1984 to 1987. During her time at Nebraska–Kearney, VanLengen would become one of their top 20 scorers all-time. With the scoring also came awards. VanLengen was a two-time Academic All-American, All CSIC-1st Team, and All District 11 First team. She graduated with a bachelor's degree in business education and an athletic training endorsement.

Upon graduation VanLengen was hired to coach the freshman basketball team, at Kearney High School. While at Kearney High, VanLengen would also act as an assistant for the varsity squad and coach the sophomore team as head coach for two years. VanLengen would teach at Kearney for a total of five years, some of which occurred while she was a graduate student.

VanLengen would eventually go back to school and get her master's degree in education at the University of Nebraska–Lincoln. While there VanLengen would serve as an assistant coach for the Nebraska Cornhuskers. A total of five years were spent coaching at Nebraska, two as a student assistant and three as a full-time assistant. VanLengen attributes her coaching career to helping her with favorite duty during a broadcast, drawing up plays on the telestrator.

VanLengen's coaching would end in 1995 when she moved to Kansas City. VanLengen joined a company called Coach's Edge, which would later be bought out by Sportvision. Coach's Edge worked on producing sports-related animated software. VanLengen would end her affiliation with the group when Sportvision bought them out, but by then she had already embarked in another field.

In 2008 VanLengen returned to Nebraska-Kearney, where she received a Distinguished Service Award from the university.

== Career ==
In 1995 VanLengen began calling Cornhuskers games for Nebraska Public Television, calling three games a year. In 1998 VanLengen was hired by Fox Sports Net to act as an analyst for Big 12, ACC, and SEC games, and in 1999 Fox made her their #1 analyst for Big 12 games. In 2001 VanLengen began calling tournament games for ESPN's first round coverage of the NCAA Tournament and Division 2 National Championship broadcasts. In later years VanLengen would be hired by Westwood One to act as an analyst for the NCAA Tournament regional Finals, by the Kansas Jayhawks to be the main analyst for the Jayhawks TV Network, and by the San Antonio Silver Stars to be their television analyst.

In 2011 VanLengen had her first exposure to play-by-play duties, working alongside Debbie Antonelli. While acting primarily as an analyst, VanLengen continues to be the play-by-play woman for select broadcasts. In 2013 VanLengen would provide basketball and volleyball play-by-play and analyst responsibilities for ESPNU and ESPN3's 2013 World University Games summer coverage.

When she isn't busy calling games, VanLengen works with SHE-KC, a sports, health and exercise publication for girls and women in Kansas City. Previously she has acted as a member of P.E. for Life, a nonprofit group fighting to get physical education back in schools, until she resigned from the position in 2010. VanLengen continues to act as the main telestrator for ESPN's NCAA Women's Basketball Championship Final Four Coverage, a position she has held since 2005, the WNBA playoffs on ESPN, a position she's had since 2011, and select NBA on ESPN playoff games, a position granted in 2012. VanLengen was awarded the 2016 Mel Greenberg Media Award by the Women's Basketball Coaches Association.
