= Bill Dwyre =

American sportswriter (born 1944)

- Born: April 4, 1944 (age 82); Sheboygan, Wisconsin, U.S.
- Education: University of Notre Dame
- Writing career
- Subject: Sports

Bill Dwyre (born April 7, 1944, in Sheboygan, Wisconsin) is a sportswriter and former newspaper sports editor. Notable for his long tenure as sports editor of the Los Angeles Times beginning in June 1981, he moved to the writing ranks full-time in June 2006, but for virtually his whole career he has worked as both an editor and writer, and today writes several weekly columns for the LA Times.

After a high-profile, multi-sport athletic career at Sheboygan North High School, Dwyre went to the University of Notre Dame, where he was a member of the tennis team and sports editor of ND Voice, the forerunner of the university’s current daily paper, The Observer. He graduated in 1966 with a degree in Communication Arts and began his journalism career shortly thereafter, as a sports copy editor for the Des Moines Register until 1968. From 1968 to 1981 he worked at the Milwaukee Journal, where he was made sports editor in 1975. He moved to the Los Angeles Times as assistant sports editor, and three months later was promoted to sports editor.

== Professional awards and recognition ==
Dwyre rose to national prominence with the Los Angeles 1984 Summer Olympics, for which he mobilized a staff of more than 100, including 59 credentialed reporters, at that time the largest of its kind for Olympic coverage. The staff published 24 special daily editions, most of them 44 pages, of Olympic coverage in addition to the paper’s regular sports section. It was an unprecedented display of newspaper Olympic coverage for which Dwyre had seemingly boundless budgetary and personnel resources. The success of the ’84 Summer Games as reflected in the excellence of the L.A. Times’ coverage garnered Dwyre several awards, including National Editor of the Year from the National Press Club in Washington, D.C.; the National Headliner Award from the Press Club of Atlantic City; and the Los Angeles Times Award for Sustained Excellence, all conferred in 1985.

Recognition for Dwyre’s work on the 1984 Summer Olympic Games has been bookended by a host of local, regional and national honors. The most prestigious was the Red Smith Award from the Associated Press Sports Editors in 1996 for service to sports journalism. Other accolades include: the Wisconsin Sportswriter of the Year (1980); the Loyola Marymount Pride of Lions Award for Service to the Community (1993); the Powerade Sports Story of the Year from the National Assn. of Sportscasters and Sportswriters for his Los Angeles Times Magazine cover story on college basketball coach and social icon John Wooden (1999); the U.S. Tennis Writers Assn. Column of the Year award (2000) for Australian Open coverage; the California Sportscasters Good Guy Award (2000); the California Golf Writers Good Guy Award (2003); the Arkansas Subiaco Academy Literary Award of Merit (2004); the Los Angeles Sports and Entertainment Commission Ambassador Award of Excellence for contributions to the city of Los Angeles (2005); the Associated Press Executive News Council’s top award for sports writing (2007); the John Wooden Pyramid of Excellence Award, in conjunction with the annual Wooden Classic Basketball Tournament (2008); California Sportswriter of the Year for 2009 from the National Assn. of Sportscasters and Sportswriters (2010); the BNP Paribas Open Media Award, given annually in Indian Wells, Calif., one of two tennis tournaments, Miami Open the other, deemed only a notch below the four majors (2011); the David F. Woods Award honoring the best Preakness Stakes story for the previous year (2011).

== Professional and civic activities ==
Dwyre is a past president of the Associated Press Sports Editors; a member of the Advisory Board of the University of Notre Dame's John W. Gallivan Program in Journalism, Ethics and Democracy; and a member of the board of directors of Casa Colina Hospitals for Rehabilitation in Pomona, California. He has spoken at journalism classes at the University of Southern California and the University of California, Los Angeles, as well as more than a dozen times at the American Press Institute in Reston, Virginia.

In addition to writing as a staff member, Dwyre wrote a monthly column for Referee magazine from 1972–2002, and has contributed articles to the Huffington Post, TWA Ambassador magazine and The Korea Times. Having been the editor for the Los Angeles Times’ late Pulitzer Prizewinning sportswriter Jim Murray, Dwyre edited a book of Murray’s columns shortly after Murray’s death in 1998, titled The Last of the Best.

Dwyre is married to the former Jill Jarvis and has two children, Amy and Patrick. He lives in San Dimas, California.
