= Michael Voepel =

American sports journalist

- Born: Los Angeles, California, U.S.
- Occupation: Sports journalist
- Employer: ESPN

Michael Voepel is an American sportswriter. He has reported on women's sports for ESPN since 1996 and has been described by the company as "the foremost authority on women's basketball".

== Biography ==
Voepel was born in Los Angeles, California, and he grew up in Moscow Mills, Missouri. Voepel studied journalism at the University of Missouri, where he reported on his first women's basketball game and graduated in 1987. Voepel's first job was in Jackson, Tennessee, and he later worked for news outlets in Columbia, Newport News, and Kansas City, including the Columbia Daily Tribune and The Kansas City Star. In 1996, Voepel joined ESPN.com to cover women's basketball, both collegiate and professional, and has since attended multiple collegiate Women's Final Four national semi-finals. Voepel has also covered other college sports and attended the Summer Olympic Games, the Winter Olympic Games, the FIFA Women's World Cup, and various professional golf tournaments. Voepel received the 2003 Mel Greenberg Media Award, awarded by the Women's Basketball Coaches Association, for his writing for The Kansas City Star and ESPN. Since 2008, Voepel has exclusively reported for ESPN.com.

Voepel was honored by the Missouri Sports Hall of Fame in 2014. In early 2022, Voepel received the Curt Gowdy Media Award for print media from the Naismith Memorial Basketball Hall of Fame for contributions to basketball media. Formerly known by the name Mechelle, Voepel came out as transgender on Twitter that August and explained he had begun a gender transition and would begin using the byline M.A. Voepel and masculine personal pronouns. Voepel wrote that winning the Curt Gowdy Media Award earlier that year motivated him to make the announcement, because he wanted to accept the award as his "authentic self" at the award ceremony the following month.
