= Mel Greenberg =

American basketball writer

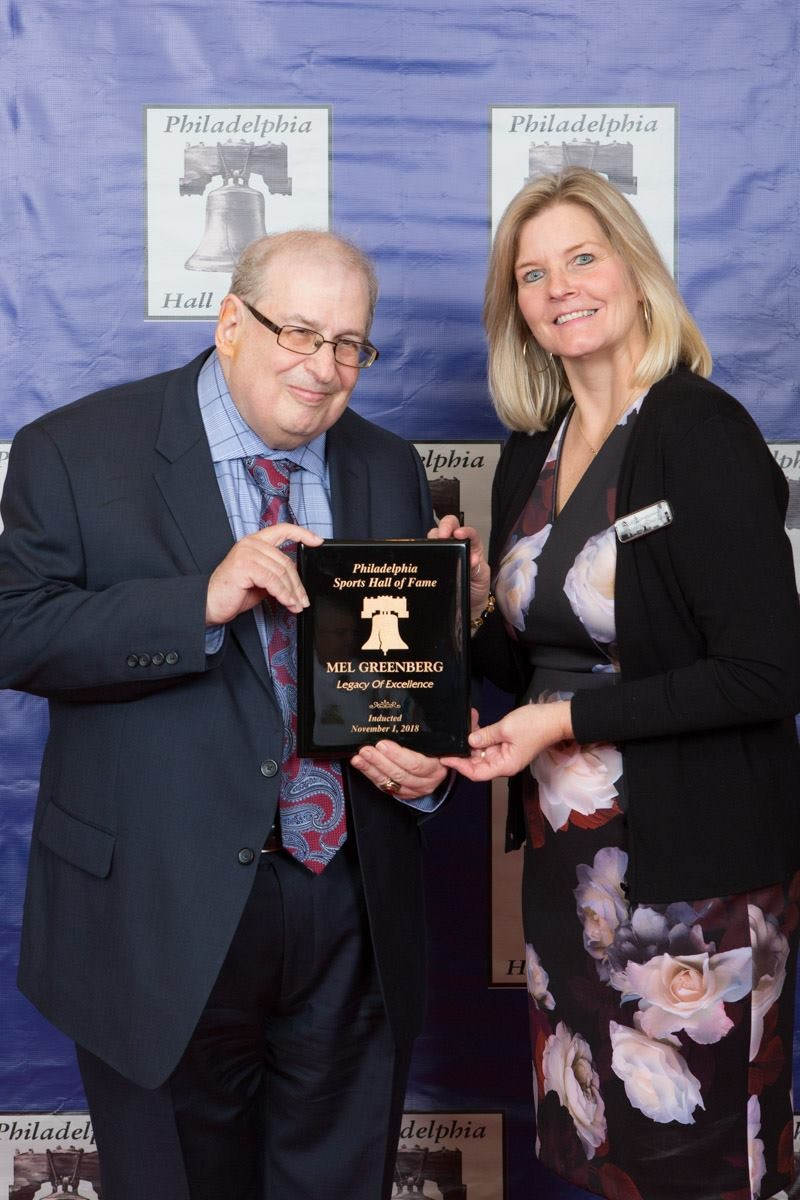
- Greenberg in 2018
- Born: April 16, 1947 (age 79)
- Education: Temple University
- Occupation: Sports journalist
- Known for: Sports journalist for The Philadelphia Inquirer; Initiated the Top 25 AP Poll for NCAA Division I women's basketball

Mel Greenberg (born April 16, 1947) is an American sports journalist focusing on women's basketball.

== Biography ==
Greenberg attended Temple University where he was the manager of the Temple Owls men's basketball team. After graduating from the Klein College of Media and Communication, Greenberg landed a job covering college and professional basketball for The Philadelphia Inquirer.

In 1975 new sports editor Jay Searcy tapped Greenberg to launch the Inquirer's women's basketball coverage and start a weekly women's poll. Greenberg initially balked at the idea, thinking it would be impossible to accurately gather the information needed, but relented and took the job, thinking it would be good to give the sport more media coverage.

This helped pioneer national coverage of the sport, and ultimately became the first Top 25 AP Poll for NCAA Division I women's basketball. He has been called "The Guru" of women's basketball.

In 1991, Greenberg received the first media award from the Women's Basketball Coaches Association, an award that has since been named after him. The annual Mel Greenberg Media Award is given to "a member of the media who has best displayed a commitment to women's basketball and to advancing the role of the media in promoting the women's game".

In 2007, Greenberg was inducted into the Women's Basketball Hall of Fame.

In 2010 Greenberg retired from the Inquirer but still maintains his personal blog, "Womhoops Guru."

In 2019 his alma mater, the Klein College of Media and Communication, inducted him into their alumni hall of fame.
