= Red Smith (sportswriter) =

American sportswriter (1905–1982)

- Red Smith
- Born: Walter Wellesley Smith; September 25, 1905; Green Bay, Wisconsin, U.S.
- Died: January 15, 1982 (aged 76); Stamford, Connecticut, U.S.
- Resting place: Long Ridge Union Cemetery
- Education: Green Bay East High School
- Alma mater: University of Notre Dame
- Occupation: Sportswriter
- Spouse(s): Catherine Cody Smith (d. 1967); Phyllis Warner Weiss (m. 1968)
- Children: 2, including Terence Smith
- Writing career
- Language: English
- Years active: 1927–1982
- Notable work: Red Smith on Fishing
- Notable awards: Pulitzer Prize for Commentary (1976); J. G. Taylor Spink Award (1976); Red Smith Award (1981)

Walter Wellesley "Red" Smith (September 25, 1905 – January 15, 1982) was an American sportswriter. Smith’s journalistic career spanned over five decades and his work influenced an entire generation of writers. In 1976, he was awarded the Pulitzer Prize for Commentary. Author David Halberstam called Smith "the greatest sportswriter of two eras."

== Career ==
Walter Wellesley Smith (he began calling himself "Red" Smith as he loathed his birth name) was born in Green Bay, Wisconsin, on September 25, 1905. He attended Green Bay East High School, which was the site of home games of the National Football League's Packers until 1957. Throughout his childhood, Smith enjoyed hiking, hunting, and fishing. After high school, Smith moved on to the University of Notre Dame and graduated in 1927.

After graduation, Smith wrote letters to at least 100 newspapers asking for a job. Finally, he was picked up by the Milwaukee Sentinel. Smith then worked for the St. Louis Star as a sportswriter. This is where Smith developed his humorous and literate style that made his writing so beloved and respected. After his stint in St. Louis, Smith worked at the Philadelphia Record for nine years, from 1936 to 1945.

After 18 years, Smith joined the New York Herald Tribune in 1945. He cemented his reputation with the Herald Tribune, as his column, “Views of Sports”, was widely read and often syndicated. Smith wrote three or four columns a week that were printed by 275 newspapers in the United States and 225 in about 30 foreign nations. When the Herald Tribune folded in 1966, Smith became a freelance writer. In 1971, at the age of 66, he was hired by The New York Times and wrote four columns a week for the next decade, sometimes devoting 18 hours a day to them.

Smith mainly wrote about the sports that interested him such as baseball, football, boxing, and horse racing. He had a distaste for basketball (which he called "whistleball") and hockey, and often wrote about one of his passions, fly fishing for trout. Many of Smith's fishing stories were written in a self-deprecating manner and he often spoke of how embarrassingly bad he was at it. In 1956, one of Smith’s columns earned him the second Grantland Rice Memorial for outstanding sportswriting. He wrote in a journalistic style and avoided the flowery language and cliches of many sportswriters.

During his time with The New York Times, Smith garnered many awards. In 1976, he was the second sportswriter to win the Pulitzer Prize for Commentary, citing "his commentary on sports in 1975 and for many other years". Smith was honored (along with Harold Kaese) with the J. G. Taylor Spink Award by the Baseball Writers' Association of America (BBWAA) in December 1976. Additionally, the Associated Press awarded him the first Red Smith Award for "outstanding contributions to sports journalism".

Smith's writing abilities and command of the English language made him much sought after as an editor or adviser by dictionary and thesaurus publishers.

=== "Open a vein and bleed" ===
Smith is best known for his famous quotation, "Writing is easy. You just open a vein and bleed." In 1946, sportswriter Paul Gallico wrote, "It is only when you open your veins and bleed onto the page a little that you establish contact with your reader." In April 1949, columnist Walter Winchell wrote, "Red Smith was asked if turning out a daily column wasn't quite a chore. ... 'Why, no', dead-panned Red. 'You simply sit down at the typewriter, open your veins, and bleed.'"

=== Criticism of Muhammad Ali ===
Smith was a strong critic of former world heavyweight boxing champion Muhammad Ali until late in Ali's career. This was because when Ali refused to serve during the Vietnam War, claiming his case as a conscientious objector, Smith, who had never served in uniform himself, wrote: "Squealing over the possibility that the military may call him up, Cassius makes himself as sorry a spectacle as those unwashed punks who picket and demonstrate against the war", and berated Ali for being a "draft dodger" and a "slacker".

Later Smith famously commented on Ali's first professional defeat in 32 bouts, against Joe Frazier: "If they fought a dozen times, Joe Frazier would whip Muhammad Ali a dozen times; and it would get easier as it went along". Ali went on to fight Frazier twice more, winning both times, once by unanimous decision and once by TKO. Before their final match, the 1975 Thrilla in Manila, Smith admitted Ali was both a great fighter and a great man.

== Later life and family ==
Smith was married twice. His first wife, Catherine, died in 1967. Smith then married Phyllis Warner Weiss in 1968. The couple lived in New Canaan, Connecticut, and in Martha’s Vineyard, Massachusetts. At the time of his death, Smith had two children, five stepchildren, six grandchildren, and three great-grandchildren.

Red's son, Terence Smith, went on to be a journalist at The New York Times, CBS News, PBS, The Huffington Post, and NPR. The younger Smith went on to win two Emmy Awards. His first Emmy Award was in 1989 for his coverage of people who lived near nuclear power plants; his second Emmy was for his coverage of Hurricane Hugo in 1990.

During The New York Times years, Smith's writing style became shorter, drier, and more concise. He believed that his columns in earlier years had rambled too much and took forever to get to the point. He also became more cynical in his beliefs ("I used to go too far in holding up athletes as flawless gods") and in the last years started increasingly criticizing the treatment of players by team owners and management, no doubt motivated by past criticism that he had gone out of his way to justify owners' behavior. He also denounced the International Olympic Committee as a 19th-century relic.

Smith's January 4, 1980, column called for the boycott by the US of the Summer Olympics in Moscow, making him the first sportswriter to do so. President Jimmy Carter announced a few weeks later that the US would not attend the games that summer, in protest of the Soviet invasion of Afghanistan.

Smith lived the last years of his life in New Canaan, Connecticut. On January 11, 1982, Smith announced that he would cut down to three columns a week, stating that "We shall see whether the quality improves." Four days later, he died of heart failure in Stamford, Connecticut. Smith is buried in Stamford's Long Ridge Union Cemetery.

Red Smith School (4K through 8th grades) in Green Bay, Wisconsin, is named in his honor. Also named in his honor is the Red Smith Handicap, a Thoroughbred horse race annually run at Aqueduct Racetrack in Queens, New York.

Smith realized the significance of sports in the American culture. He once stated the following: “Sports is not really a play world. I think it’s the real world. The people we’re writing about in professional sports, they’re suffering and living and dying and loving, and trying to make their way through life just as the bricklayers and politicians are.” He also said "It is no coincidence that the largest surviving monument of the ancient Greeks and Romans is the Colosseum in Rome, the Yankee Stadium of its time."

== Selected works ==
- Smith, Walter W. (1963). Red Smith on Fishing. Garden City, New York: Doubleday & Company.
- The Best of Red Smith
- Red Smith's Sports Annual
- Views of Sport
- Out of the Red
- "Absent Friends"
- " Strawberries in Winter"
