= Mel Greenberg Media Award =

Women's basketball award for media coverage

- Description: Award recognizing a member of the media who has best displayed a commitment to women’s basketball and to advancing the role of the media in the women’s game
- Country: United States
- Presented by: Women's Basketball Coaches Association

The Mel Greenberg Media Award, named after Women's Basketball Hall of Fame Legend Mel Greenberg, is presented annually by the Women's Basketball Coaches Association (WBCA) to "a member of the media who has best displayed a commitment to women’s basketball and to advancing the role of the media in the women’s game".

== Selection process ==
The inaugural award was given to Mel Greenberg in 1991 by the WBCA. Thereafter, future winners have been selected by the past recipients. Candidates for consideration must "have had a positive impact on the growth and national or regional exposure of the sport, been involved in the media exposure of women’s basketball for a minimum of five years and should be a media ambassador for the women’s game."

== Presentation ==
The award is presented annually at the WBCA Award ceremony, during the annual WBCA Convention, which is held each year in conjunction with the NCAA Women's Final Four.

== Award winners ==
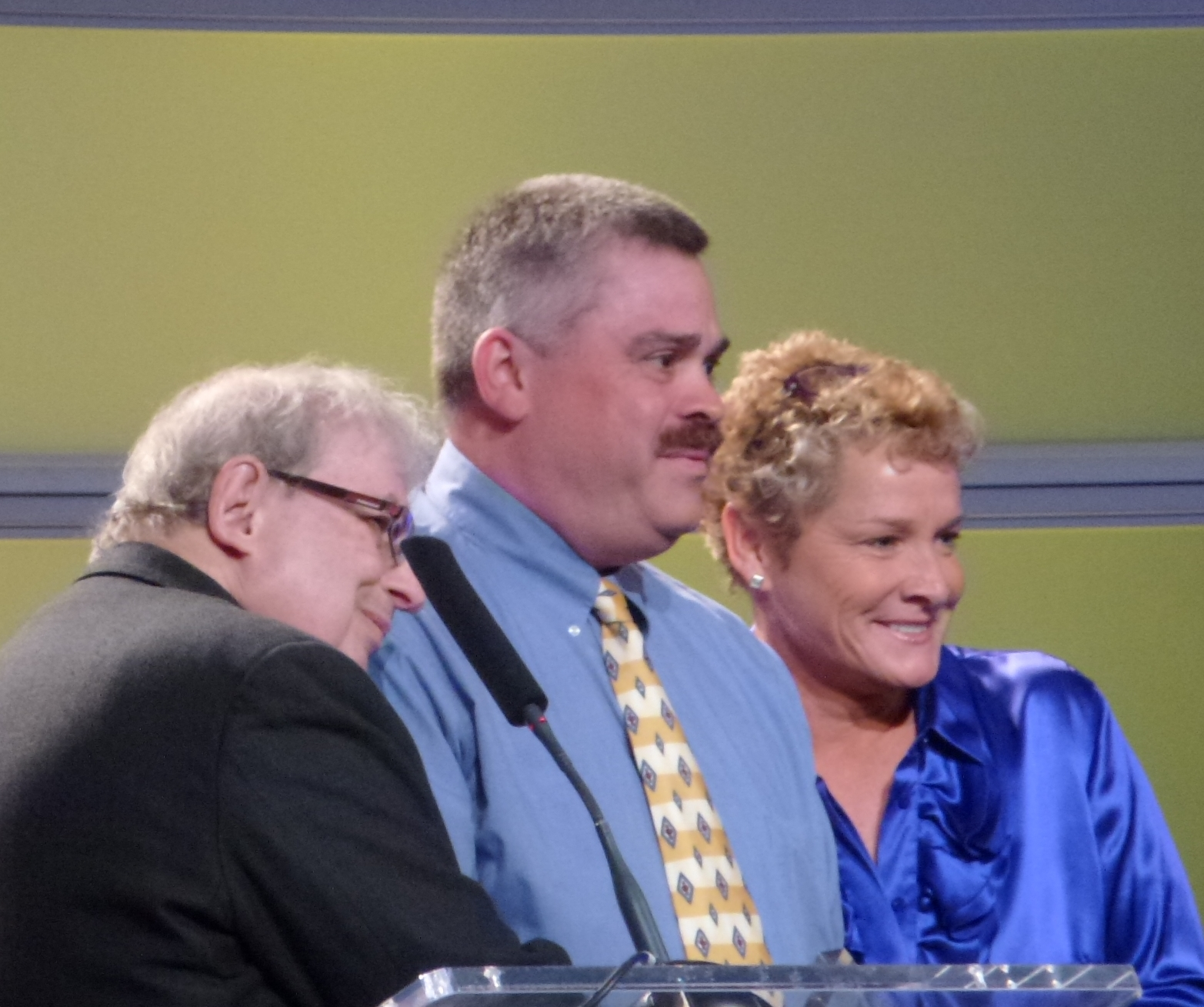
Mike Carmin accepting the Mel Greenberg Media Award

- 1991—Mel Greenberg, Philadelphia Inquirer
- 1992—Debbie Becker, USA TODAY
- 1993—Jane Burns, Des Moines Register
- 1994—Mimi Griffin, MSG Promotions/ESPN
- 1995—Mike Augustin, St. Paul Pioneer Press
- 1996—Debby Jennings, University of Tennessee
- 1997—Mitch Parkinson, Southern Illinois University
- 1998—Mary Garber, Winston-Salem Journal
- 1999—Ann Meyers Drysdale, ESPN
- 2000—Vic Dorr, Richmond Times-Dispatch
- 2001—Robin Roberts, ABC News
- 2002—Bob Kenney, Courier Post
- 2003—Mechelle Voepel, Kansas City Star/ESPN
- 2004—Tam Flarup, University of Wisconsin–Madison
- 2005—Dave Loane, University of Illinois
- 2006—Bill Jauss, Chicago Tribune
- 2007—Debbie Antonelli, CSTV
- 2008—Dan Fleser, Knoxville News-Sentinel
- 2009—Chuck Schoffner, Associated Press
- 2010—Dick Patrick, USA Today
- 2011—Carol Stiff, ESPN
- 2012—Mike Carmin, Lafayette Journal & Courier
- 2013—Vicki Friedman, Freelance Writer
- 2014—Mary Jo Haverbeck (deceased), Penn State SID
- 2015—Graham Hays ESPN
- 2016—Brenda VanLengen
- 2017—Ken Neal, Fox Sports
- 2018—Doug Feinberg, The Associated Press
- 2019—Michelle Smith-McDonald
- 2020—Maria M. Cornelius
- 2021—LaChina Robinson, ESPN
- 2022—Holly Rowe, ESPN and Charles Hallman, Minnesota Spokesman-Recorder
- 2023—Cheryl Coward, and Danny Davis
- 2024—Patricia Lowry, ESPN
- 2025—Carolyn Peck, ESPN
- 2026—Rick Nixon, and Jeff Metcalfe

== See also ==
- Mel Greenberg
