= Hoyt Wilhelm =

American baseball player (1922–2002)

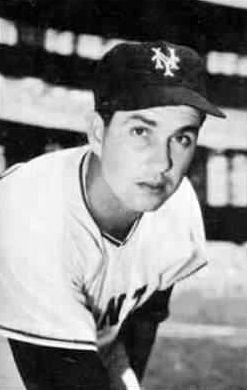
- Wilhelm with the New York Giants in 1953
- Pitcher
- Born: July 26, 1922; Huntersville, North Carolina, U.S.
- Died: August 23, 2002 (aged 80); Sarasota, Florida, U.S.
- Batted: Right Threw: Right

MLB debut
- April 18, 1952, for the New York Giants

Last MLB appearance
- July 10, 1972, for the Los Angeles Dodgers

MLB statistics
- Win–loss record: 143–122
- Earned run average: 2.52
- Strikeouts: 1,610
- Saves: 228
- Stats at Baseball Reference

Teams
- New York Giants (1952–1956); St. Louis Cardinals (1957); Cleveland Indians (1957–1958); Baltimore Orioles (1958–1962); Chicago White Sox (1963–1968); California Angels (1969); Atlanta Braves (1969–1970); Chicago Cubs (1970); Atlanta Braves (1971); Los Angeles Dodgers (1971–1972)

Career highlights and awards
- 8× All-Star (1953, 1959, 1959², 1961–1962², 1970); World Series champion (1954); 2× ERA leader (1952, 1959); Pitched a no-hitter on September 20, 1958; Baltimore Orioles Hall of Fame

Member of the National

Baseball Hall of Fame
- Induction: 1985
- Vote: 83.8% (eighth ballot)

James Hoyt Wilhelm (July 26, 1922 – August 23, 2002), nicknamed "Old Sarge", was an American professional baseball pitcher in Major League Baseball (MLB) with the New York Giants, St. Louis Cardinals, Cleveland Indians, Baltimore Orioles, Chicago White Sox, California Angels, Atlanta Braves, Chicago Cubs, and Los Angeles Dodgers between 1952 and 1972. Wilhelm was elected to the Baseball Hall of Fame in 1985.

Wilhelm grew up in North Carolina, fought in World War II, and then spent several years in the minor leagues before starting his major league career at the age of 29. He was best known for his knuckleball, which enabled him to have great longevity. He appeared occasionally as a starting pitcher, but pitched mainly as a reliever. Wilhelm won 124 games in relief, which is still the major league record as of 2026. He was the first pitcher to reach 200 saves, and the first to appear in 1,000 games.

Wilhelm was nearly 30 years old when he entered the major leagues, and pitched until he was nearly 50. He retired with one of the lowest career earned run averages, 2.52, in baseball history. After retiring as a player in 1972, Wilhelm held longtime coaching jobs with the New York Yankees and Atlanta Braves.

Wilhelm was inducted into the National Baseball Hall of Fame in 1985 with 83.8% of the vote in his eighth year of eligibility. He holds the record with Satchel Paige and Goose Gossage for the most franchises played for (9) by a Hall of Fame pitcher. Wilhelm lived in Sarasota, Florida, for many years, and died there in 2002.

== Early life ==
James Hoyt Wilhelm was born on July 26, 1922, long thought to have been 1923, in Huntersville, North Carolina. (Note: Biographer Mark Armour notes that Wilhelm's birth year was erroneously believed to be 1923 until he died and his birth certificate was examined.) He was one of eleven children born to poor tenant farmers John and Ethel (née Stanley) Wilhelm in Huntersville, North Carolina. He played baseball at Cornelius High School in Cornelius, North Carolina. Knowing he could not throw fast, he began experimenting with a knuckleball after reading about pitcher Dutch Leonard. He practiced honing it with a tennis ball, hoping it was his best shot at Big League success.

== Professional career ==
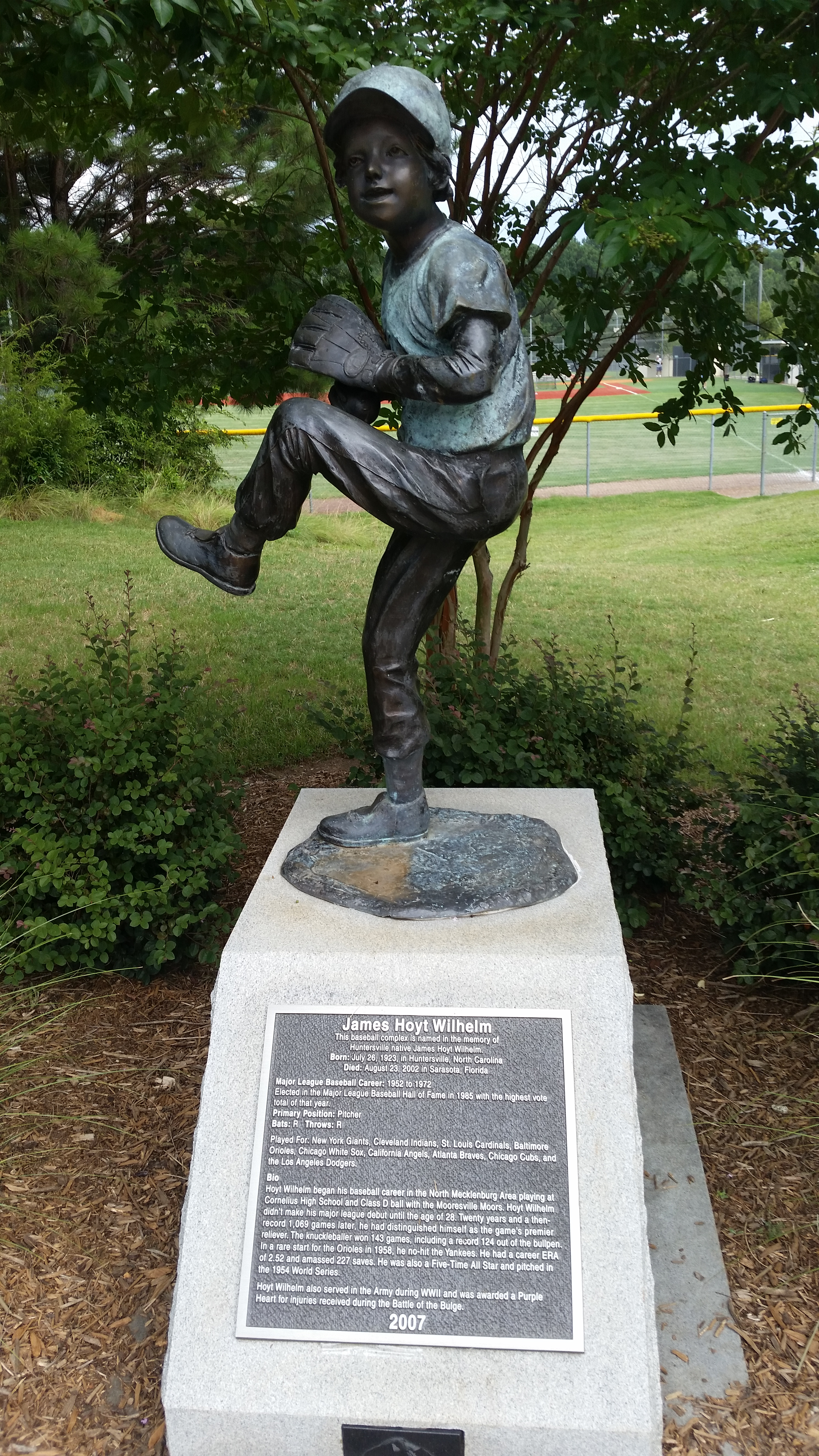
James Hoyt Wilhelm Commemorative Statue outside Huntersville Athletic Park in Huntersville, North Carolina

Wilhelm made his professional debut with the Mooresville Moors of the Class-D North Carolina State League in 1942. He served in the United States Army in the European Theater during World War II and participated in the Battle of the Bulge, where he was wounded, earning the Purple Heart for his actions. He rose to the rank of staff sergeant while in the Army, and played his entire career with a piece of fragmentation lodged in his back as a result of the wounds he received in battle. Wilhelm carried the nickname "Old Sarge" because of his service in the military.

After his release from the military, Wilhelm returned to the Moors for the 1946 season, and earned 41 wins over the 1946 and 1947 seasons. He later recalled being dropped from a Class D minor league team and having the manager tell him to forget about the knuckleball, but he persisted with it.

=== Draft and minor leagues ===
The Boston Braves purchased Wilhelm from Mooresville in 1947, and on November 20, 1947, he was drafted by the New York Giants from the Braves in the 1947 minor league draft.

Wilhelm's first assignment in the Giants organization was in Class B with the 1948 Knoxville Smokies, for whom he registered 13 wins and nine losses. He also spent a few games that season with the Class A Jacksonville Tars of the South Atlantic League, and returned to Jacksonville in 1949, earning a 17–12 win–loss record and a 2.66 earned run average (ERA). Wilhelm was promoted to the Class AAA Minneapolis Millers in 1950, where he was the starting pitcher in 25 of the 35 games he pitched in, registering a 15–11 record with a 4.95 ERA. His role in 1951 with the Millers was the same as the year before, primarily as a starter, but also making eleven relief appearances. His ERA came down to 3.94 in 1951, but his record fell to 11–14.

=== New York Giants (1952–1956) ===
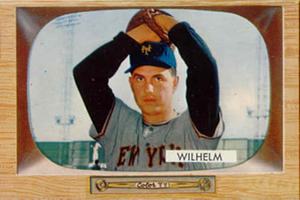
1955 Bowman card of Wilhelm for New York Giants

Though Wilhelm was primarily a starting pitcher in the minor leagues, he had been called up to a Giants team whose strong starting pitchers had led them to a National League (NL) pennant the year before. Giants manager Leo Durocher did not think that Wilhelm's knuckleball approach would be effective for more than a few innings at a time. He assigned Wilhelm to the team's bullpen.

Wilhelm made his MLB debut with the Giants on April 18, 1952, at age 29, giving up a hit and two walks while only recording one out. On April 23, 1952, in his third game with the New York Giants, Wilhelm batted for the first time in the majors. Facing rookie Dick Hoover of the Boston Braves, Wilhelm hit a home run over the short right-field fence at the Polo Grounds. Although he went to bat a total of 432 times in his career, he never hit another home run.

Pitching exclusively in relief, Wilhelm led the NL with a 2.43 ERA in his rookie year. He won 15 games and lost three. Wilhelm finished fourth in the NL Most Valuable Player Award voting that season, behind rookie reliever Joe Black of the Dodgers. Jim Konstanty had won it for the Phillies in 1950, and Ellis Kinder had finished seventh in the AL voting in 1951, so it was a time when relief pitchers were starting to receive appreciation from the sportswriters. Wilhelm finished second in the Rookie of the Year Award voting to Joe Black. Wilhelm made 69 relief appearances in 1953, his win–loss record decreased to 7–8 and he issued 77 walks against 71 strikeouts. Wilhelm was named to the NL All-Star team that year, but he did not play in the game because team manager Charlie Dressen did not think that any of the catchers could handle his knuckleball. The Giants renewed Wilhelm's contract in February 1954.

In 1954, Wilhelm was a key piece of the pitching staff that led the 1954 Giants to a world championship. He pitched 111 innings, finishing with a 12–4 record and a 2.10 ERA. During one of Wilhelm's appearances that season, catcher Ray Katt committed four passed balls in one inning to set the major league record; the record has subsequently been tied twice. When Stan Musial set a record by hitting five home runs in a doubleheader that year, Wilhelm was pitching in the second game and gave up two of the home runs. The 1954 World Series represented Wilhelm's only career postseason play. He pitched 2 1/3 innings over two games, earning a save in the third game. The team won the World Series in a four-game sweep.

Wilhelm's ERA increased to 3.93 over 59 games and 103 innings pitched in 1955, but he managed a 4–1 record. He finished the 1956 season with a 4–9 record and a 3.83 ERA in 89 1/3 innings. Sportswriter Bob Driscoll later attributed Wilhelm's difficulties in the mid-1950s to the decline in the career of Giants catcher Wes Westrum, writing that baseball was "a game of inches, and for Hoyt, Wes had been that inch in the right direction."

=== St. Louis Cardinals (1957) ===
On February 26, 1957, Wilhelm was traded by the Giants to the St. Louis Cardinals for Whitey Lockman. At the time of the trade, St. Louis manager Fred Hutchinson described Wilhelm as the type of pitcher who "makes us a definite pennant threat ... He'll help us where we need help the most." In 40 games with the Cardinals that season, he earned 11 saves but finished with a 1–4 record and his highest ERA to that point in his career (4.25).

=== Cleveland Indians (1957–1958) ===
The Cardinals placed him on waivers in September and he was claimed by the Cleveland Indians, who used him in two games that year.

In 1958, Cleveland manager Bobby Bragan used Wilhelm occasionally as a starter. Although he had a 2.49 ERA, none of the Indians' catchers could handle Wilhelm's knuckleball.

=== Baltimore Orioles (1958–1962) ===
General manager Frank Lane, alarmed at the large number of passed balls, allowed the Baltimore Orioles to select Wilhelm off waivers on August 23, 1958. In Baltimore, Wilhelm lived near the home of third baseman Brooks Robinson and their families became close friends. On September 20 of that year, Wilhelm no-hit the eventual World Champion New York Yankees 1–0 at Memorial Stadium, in only his ninth career start. He allowed two baserunners on walks and struck out eight. The no-hitter had been threatened at one point in the ninth inning when Hank Bauer bunted along the baseline, but Robinson allowed the ball to roll and it veered foul. The no-hitter was the first in the franchise's Baltimore history; the Orioles had moved from St. Louis after the 1953 season.

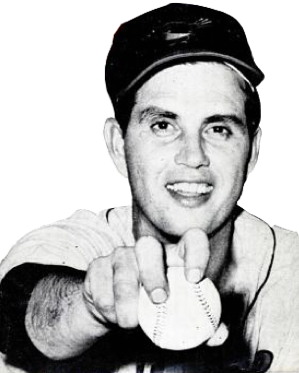
Wilhelm in 1959

Orioles catchers had difficulty catching the Wilhelm knuckleball again in 1959 and they set an MLB record with 49 passed balls. During one April game, catcher Gus Triandos had four passed balls while catching for Wilhelm and he described the game as "the roughest day I ever put in during my life." Author Bill James has written that Wilhelm and Triandos "established the principle that a knuckleball pitcher and a big, slow catcher make an awful combination." Triandos once said, "Heaven is a place where no one throws a knuckleball."

Despite the passed balls, Wilhelm won the American League ERA title with a 2.19 ERA. During the 1960 season, Orioles manager Paul Richards devised a larger mitt so his catchers could handle the knuckleball. Richards was well equipped with starting pitchers during that year. By the middle of the season, he said that eight of his pitchers could serve as starters. Wilhelm started 11 of the 41 games in which he appeared. He earned an 11–8 record, a 3.31 ERA and seven saves. He started only one game the following year, but he was an All-Star, registered 18 saves and had a 2.30 ERA.

In 1962, Wilhelm had his fourth All-Star season, finishing with a 7–10 record, a 1.94 ERA and 15 saves.

=== Chicago White Sox (1963–1968) ===
On January 14, 1963, Wilhelm was traded by the Orioles with Ron Hansen, Dave Nicholson and Pete Ward to the Chicago White Sox for Luis Aparicio and Al Smith. Early in that season, White Sox manager Al López said that Wilhelm had improved his pitching staff by 40 percent. He said that Wilhelm was "worth more than a 20-game winner, and he works with so little effort that he probably can last as long as Satchel Paige." He registered 21 saves and a 2.64 ERA.

In 1964, Wilhelm finished with career highs in both saves (27) and games pitched (73), as the White Sox finished with a record of 98–64. His ERA decreased to 1.99 that season; it remained less than 2.00 through the 1968 season. In 1965, Wilhelm contributed to another passed balls record when Chicago catcher J. C. Martin allowed 33 of them in one season. That total set a modern single-season baseball record for the category. Wilhelm's career-low ERA (1.31) came in 1967, when he earned an 8–3 record for the White Sox with 12 saves.

In the 1968 season, Wilhelm was getting close to breaking the all-time games pitched record belonging to Cy Young (906 games). Chicago manager Eddie Stanky began to think about using Wilhelm as a starting pitcher for game number 907. However, the White Sox fired Stanky before the record came up. Wilhelm later broke the record as a relief pitcher. He also set MLB records for consecutive errorless games by a pitcher, career victories in relief, games finished and innings pitched in relief. Despite Wilhelm's success, the White Sox, who had won at least 83 games per season in the 1960s, performed poorly. They finished 1968 with a 67–95 record.

Wilhelm was noted during this period for his mentoring of relief pitcher Wilbur Wood, who came to the 1967 White Sox in a trade. Wood sometimes threw a knuckleball upon his arrival in Chicago, but Wilhelm encouraged him to throw it full-time. By 1968, Wood won 13 games, saved 16 games and earned a 1.87 ERA. He credited Wilhelm with helping him to master the knuckleball, as the White Sox coaches did not know much about how to throw it. Between 1968 and 1970, Wood pitched in more games (241) than any other pitcher and more innings―400 1/3―than any other relief pitcher.

=== California Angels (1969) ===
After the 1968 season, MLB expanded and an expansion draft was conducted in which the new teams could select certain players from the established teams. The White Sox left Wilhelm unprotected, possibly because they did not believe that teams would have interest in a much older pitcher. On October 15, 1968, Wilhelm was chosen in the expansion draft by the Kansas City Royals as the 49th pick. That offseason, he was traded by the Royals to the California Angels for Ed Kirkpatrick and Dennis Paepke.

Wilhelm pitched 44 games for the 1969 California Angels and had a 2.47 ERA, ten saves, and a 5–7 record.

=== Atlanta Braves (1969–1970) ===
On September 8, 1969, Wilhelm and Bob Priddy were traded to the Atlanta Braves for Clint Compton and Mickey Rivers. He finished the 1969 season by pitching in eight games for the Braves, earning four saves and recording a 0.73 ERA over 12 1/3 innings pitched. Wilhelm then spent most of the 1970 season with the Braves, pitching in 50 games for the team and earning ten saves.

=== Chicago Cubs (1970) ===
On September 21, 1970, Wilhelm was selected off waivers by the Chicago Cubs, for whom he appeared in three games.

=== Second stint with Atlanta Braves (1971) ===
Wilhelm was traded back to the Braves for Hal Breeden on November 30, 1970. As the Cubs had acquired Wilhelm late in the season to bolster their playoff contention, the trade back to the Braves was a source of controversy. Commissioner Bowie Kuhn investigated the transaction, and in December ruled that he did not find evidence of impropriety associated with the transactions that sent Wilhelm to the Cubs and quickly back to the Braves.

Wilhelm was released by the Braves on June 29, 1971, having pitched in three games for that year's Braves.

=== Los Angeles Dodgers (1971–1972) ===
Wilhelm signed with the Los Angeles Dodgers on July 10, 1971, and appeared in nine games for the Dodgers, giving up two earned runs in 17 2/3 innings. He also pitched in eight games that season for the team's Class AAA minor league affiliate, the Spokane Indians. Wilhelm started six of those games and registered a 3.89 ERA.

Wilhelm pitched in 16 games for the Dodgers in 1972, registering a 4.62 ERA over 25 innings. The Dodgers released him on July 21, 1972. He never appeared in another game.

At the time of his retirement, Wilhelm had pitched in a then major league record 1,070 games. He is recognized as the first pitcher to have saved 200 games in his career, and the first pitcher to appear in 1,000 games. Wilhelm is one of the oldest players to have pitched in the major leagues; his final appearance was 16 days short of his 50th birthday.

Wilhelm retired with the lowest career earned run average of any major league hurler after 1927 (Walter Johnson) who had pitched more than 2,000 innings.

== Later life ==
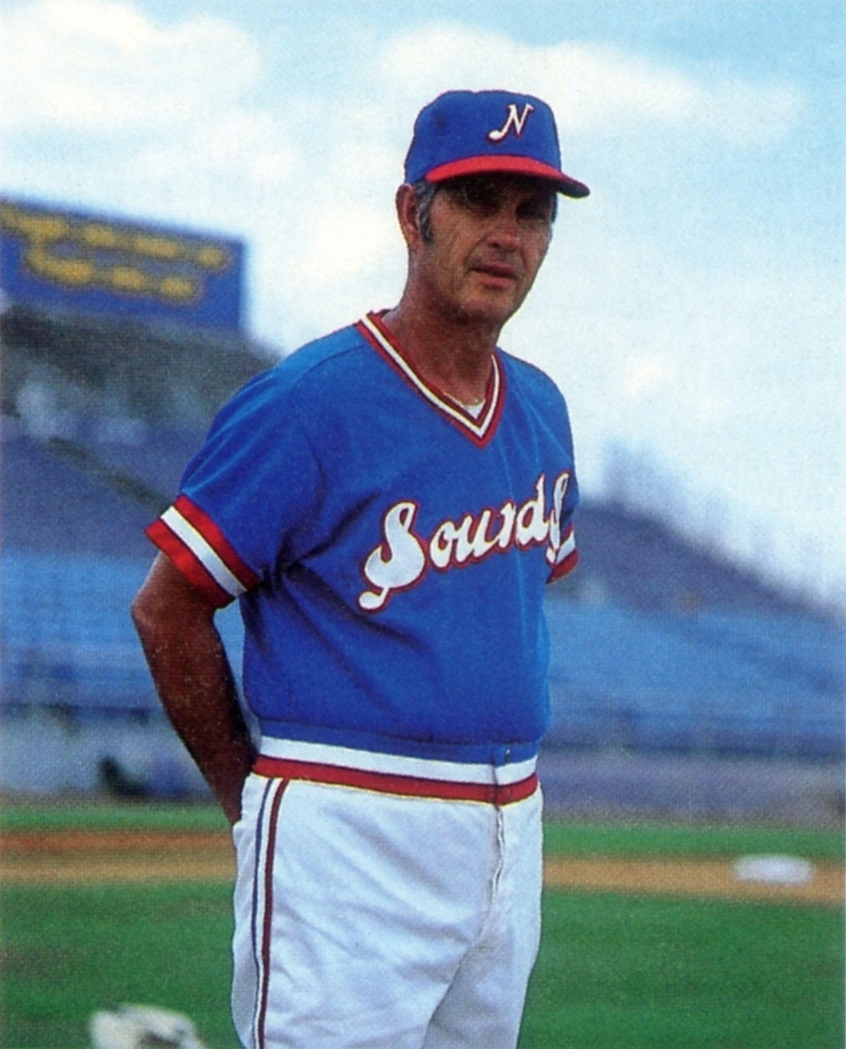
Wilhelm served as pitching coach of the Nashville Sounds from 1982 to 1984.

After his retirement as a player, Wilhelm managed two minor league teams in the Atlanta Braves system for single seasons. He led the 1973 Greenwood Braves of the Western Carolinas League to a 61–66 record, then had a 33–33 record with the 1975 Kingsport Braves of the Appalachian League. He also worked as a minor league pitching coach for the New York Yankees for 22 years. As a coach, Wilhelm said that he did not teach pitchers the knuckleball, believing that people had to be born with a knack for throwing it. He sometimes worked individually with major league players who wanted to improve their knuckleballs, including Joe Niekro. The Yankees gave Wilhelm permission to work with Mickey Lolich in 1979 even though Lolich pitched for the San Diego Padres.

Wilhelm was on the ballot for the Baseball Hall of Fame for eight years before he was elected. After Wilhelm failed to garner enough votes for induction in 1983, sportswriter Jim Murray criticized the voters, saying that while Wilhelm never had the look of a baseball player, he was "the best player in history at what he does." He fell short by 13 votes in 1984. Wilhelm was inducted into the Baseball Hall of Fame in 1985. At his induction ceremony, he said that he had achieved all three of his initial major league goals: appearing in a World Series, being named to an All-Star team, and throwing a no-hitter.

He and his wife Peggy lived in Sarasota, Florida. They raised three children together: Patti, Pam, and Jim. Wilhelm died of heart failure in a Sarasota nursing home in 2002.

In 2013, the Bob Feller Act of Valor Award honored Wilhelm as one of 37 Baseball Hall of Fame members for his service in the United States Army during World War II.

== Legacy ==
[Hoyt] had the best knuckleball you'd ever want to see. He knew where it was going when he threw it, but when he got two strikes on you, he'd break out one that even he didn't know where it was going.

— Brooks Robinson

Wilhelm was known as a "relief ace", and his teams used him in a new way that became a trend. Rather than bringing in a relief pitcher only when the starting pitcher had begun to struggle, teams increasingly called upon their relief pitchers toward the end of any close game. Wilhelm was the first relief pitcher elected to the Baseball Hall of Fame.

He is also remembered as one of the most successful and "probably the most famous 'old' player in history." Although, due largely to his military service, Wilhelm did not debut in the major leagues until he was already 29 years old, he nonetheless managed to appear in 21 major league seasons. He earned the nickname "Old Folks" while he still had more than a decade left in his playing career. He was the oldest player in Major League Baseball for each of his final seven seasons.

Former teammate Moose Skowron commented on Wilhelm's key pitch, saying, "Hoyt was a good guy, and he threw the best knuckleball I ever saw. You never knew what Hoyt's pitch would do. I don't think he did either." Baseball executive Roland Hemond agreed, saying, "Wilhelm's knuckleball did more than anyone else's ... There was so much action on it."

Before Wilhelm, the knuckleball was primarily mixed in to older pitchers' repertoires at the end of their careers to offset their slowing fastballs and to reduce stress on their arms, thereby extending their careers. Wilhelm broke with tradition when he began throwing the pitch as a teenager and threw it nearly every pitch. The New York Times linked his knuckleball with that of modern pitcher R. A. Dickey, as Wilhelm taught pitcher Charlie Hough the knuckleball in 1971, and Hough taught it to Dickey while coaching with the Texas Rangers.

Wilhelm appeared as a special guest on the September 22, 1954 episode of the CBS television show, I've Got a Secret.

== See also ==
- List of knuckleball pitchers
- List of Major League Baseball career ERA leaders
- List of Major League Baseball career saves leaders
- List of Major League Baseball annual ERA leaders
- List of Major League Baseball no-hitters
- List of Major League Baseball leaders in games finished
- List of players with a home run in first major league at-bat

== Notes ==
Achievements
Preceded by Roy Face	All-Time Saves Leader; 1964–1979	Succeeded by Rollie Fingers
Preceded by Jim Bunning	No-hitter pitcher September 20, 1958	Succeeded by Don Cardwell
