= Terence Smith (journalist) =

American journalist (born 1938)

- Born: Terence F. Smith; 1938 (age 87–88); New York City, New York, U.S.
- Occupation: Journalist
- Years active: 1965–present
- Spouse: Susanne Stout
- Children: two
- Parent(s): Walter Wellesley (Red) Smith, sportswriter

Terence Smith (born 1938) is an American journalist who worked as a special correspondent at The NewsHour with Jim Lehrer, worked for The New York Times, and CBS News. Smith has been a guest host for The Diane Rehm Show, and contributes to The Huffington Post. At CBS, Smith won two Emmy Awards, in 1990 for his coverage of Hurricane Hugo, and in 1989 for his coverage of people who live near nuclear power plants. He retired from PBS NewsHour in 2006. He has strong environmental interests and served on the advisory board of the Smithsonian Environmental Research Center and chaired the Board of Trustees of the Chesapeake Bay Trust of the State of Maryland from 2015 to 2017.

Smith was born to sportswriter Red Smith, and later earned a Bachelor of Arts degree from the University of Notre Dame in 1960.

Smith is married and has two grown children and three grandchildren. He lives in the Eastport neighborhood in Annapolis, Maryland, on the shore of the Chesapeake Bay.

== Works ==
- Smith, Terence (2021). Four Wars, Five Presidents: A Reporter's Journey from Jerusalem to Saigon to the White House. Lanham, Maryland: Rowman & Littlefield. ISBN 9781538160619.

== Sources ==
- "Terence Smith, Media Correspondent and Senior Producer". Online NewsHour. PBS. Archived from the original on March 27, 2008.
- "Terence Smith". HuffPost.
- "Interview: Terence Smith, NewsHour with Jim Lehrer". JournalismJobs.com. January 2004. Archived from the original on April 13, 2007.
- "Speaker Showcase: Terence Smith". wkconline.org. Western Knight Center for Specialized Journalism. April 24, 2002. Archived from the original on November 5, 2004.
