= 1985 Baseball Hall of Fame balloting =

Elections to the Baseball Hall of Fame

National Baseball

Hall of Fame and Museum
- New inductees: 4
- via BBWAA: 2
- via Veterans Committee: 2
- Total inductees: 193
- Induction date: July 28, 1985

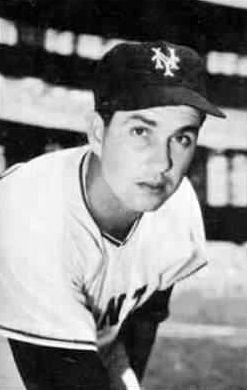
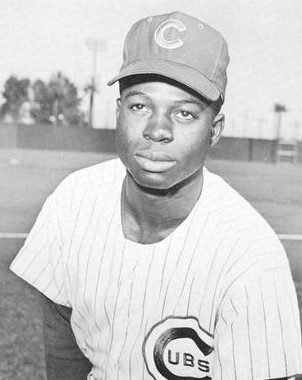
1985 BBWAA inductees Hoyt Wilhelm (left) and Lou Brock

Elections to the Baseball Hall of Fame for 1985 followed the system in place since 1978. The Baseball Writers' Association of America (BBWAA) voted by mail to select from recent major league players and elected two, Lou Brock and Hoyt Wilhelm. The Veterans Committee met in closed sessions to consider older major league players as well as managers, umpires, executives, and figures from the Negro leagues. It also selected two players, Enos Slaughter and Arky Vaughan. A formal induction ceremony was held in Cooperstown, New York, on July 28, 1985, with broadcaster Brent Musburger handling introductions and Commissioner of Baseball Peter Ueberroth in attendance.

== BBWAA election ==
The BBWAA was authorized to elect players active in 1965 or later, but not after 1979; the ballot included candidates from the 1984 ballot who received at least 5% of the vote but were not elected, along with selected players, chosen by a screening committee, whose last appearance was in 1979. All 10-year members of the BBWAA were eligible to vote.

Eleven players, who had previously been dropped from the ballot, were re-listed, following review and approval from a committee of six writers. Added were: Dick Allen, Ken Boyer, Clay Carroll, Ron Fairly, Curt Flood, Harvey Haddix, Denny McLain, Dave McNally, Vada Pinson, Ron Santo, and Wilbur Wood. Ultimately, none of the 11 were elected by the BBWAA. Santo was elected to the Hall by the Golden Era Committee in 2012 balloting and Allen was elected to the Hall by the Classic Baseball Committee in 2025 balloting.

Voters were instructed to cast votes for up to 10 candidates; any candidate receiving votes on at least 75% of the ballots would be honored with induction to the Hall. The ballot consisted of 41 players; a total of 395 ballots were cast, with 297 votes required for election. A total of 2,918 individual votes were cast, an average of 7.39 per ballot. Those candidates receiving less than 5% of the vote will not appear on future BBWAA ballots, but may eventually be considered by the Veterans Committee.

Candidates who were eligible for the first time are indicated here with a dagger (†). The two candidates who received at least 75% of the vote and were elected are indicated in bold italics; candidates who have since been elected in subsequent elections are indicated in italics. The 18 candidates who received less than 5% of the vote, thus becoming ineligible for future BBWAA consideration, are indicated with an asterisk (*).

Nellie Fox was on the ballot for the 15th and final time.

Player	Votes	Percent	Change	Year
**Hoyt Wilhelm**	331	83.8	▲11.8%	8th
**Lou Brock**†	315	79.7	-	1st
Nellie Fox	295	74.7	▲13.7%	15th
Billy Williams	252	63.8	▲13.7%	4th
Jim Bunning	214	54.2	▲4.3%	9th
Catfish Hunter†	212	53.7	-	1st
Roger Maris	128	32.4	▲5.8%	12th
Harvey Kuenn	125	31.6	▲5.3%	9th
Orlando Cepeda	114	28.9	▼1.9%	6th
Tony Oliva	114	28.9	▼1.9%	4th
Maury Wills	93	23.5	▼2.3%	8th
Bill Mazeroski	87	22.0	▲3.6%	8th
Lew Burdette	82	20.8	▼3.3%	13th
Mickey Lolich†	78	19.7	-	1st
Ken Boyer	68	17.2	-	6th
Roy Face	62	15.7	▼0.4%	10th
Elston Howard	54	13.7	▲2.5%	12th
Ron Santo	53	13.4	-	2nd
Joe Torre	44	11.1	▼0.1%	3rd
Don Larsen	32	8.1	▲1.9%	12th
Thurman Munson	32	8.1	▲0.9%	5th
Dick Allen	28	7.1	-	2nd
Curt Flood	28	7.1	-	4th
Vada Pinson*	19	4.8	-	4th
Wilbur Wood*	16	4.1	▲0.6%	2nd
Harvey Haddix*	15	3.8	-	10th
Dave McNally*	7	1.8	-	3rd
Ken Holtzman†*	4	1.0	-	1st
Ron Fairly*	3	0.8	▲0.8%	2nd
Jim Lonborg†*	3	0.8	-	1st
Andy Messersmith†*	3	0.8	-	1st
Don Kessinger†*	2	0.5	-	1st
Denny McLain*	2	0.5	-	3rd
Jesús Alou†*	1	0.3	-	1st
Rico Carty†*	1	0.3	-	1st
Dock Ellis†*	1	0.3	-	1st
Clay Carroll*	0	0.0	▼0.2%	2nd
Ed Kranepool†*	0	0.0	-	1st
George Scott†*	0	0.0	-	1st
Bobby Tolan†*	0	0.0	-	1st
Roy White†*	0	0.0	-	1st

Key to colors
Elected to the Hall. These individuals are also indicated in **bold italics**.
Players who were elected in future elections. These individuals are also indicated in plain italics.
Players not yet elected who returned on the 1986 ballot.
Eliminated from future BBWAA voting. These individuals remain eligible for future Veterans Committee consideration.

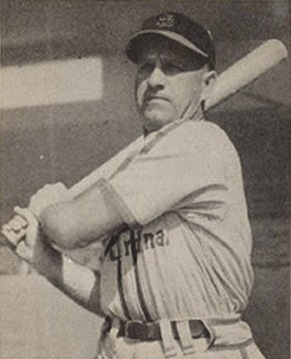
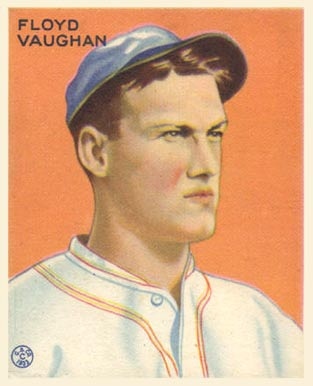
1985 Veterans Committee inductees Enos Slaughter (left) and Arky Vaughan

Thurman Munson, who died in a plane crash in 1979, would have been eligible for the first time, but the five-year waiting period was waived.

The newly eligible players included 16 All-Stars, two of whom were not included on the ballot, representing a total of 44 All-Star selections. Among the new candidates were 8-time All-Star Catfish Hunter,.and 6-time All-Stars Lou Brock and Don Kessinger. The field included two Cy Young Award-winners (Catfish Hunter and Jim Lonborg), as well as George Scott, whose eight Gold Gloves at first base were a record at the time.

Players eligible for the first time who were not on the ballot were: Darrel Chaney, Gene Clines, Joe Coleman, Willie Davis, Frank Duffy, Ray Fosse, Ellie Hendricks, Steve Mingori, Bob Montgomery, Tom Murphy, Bob Robertson, Wayne Twitchell, and Bobby Valentine.

== J. G. Taylor Spink Award ==
Joe McGuff (1926–2006) received the J. G. Taylor Spink Award honoring a baseball writer. The award was voted at the December 1984 meeting of the BBWAA, and included in the summer 1985 ceremonies.
