= Mary Garber =

American sportswriter (1916–2008)

- Born: Mary Ellen Garber; April 16, 1916; New York City, New York, U.S.
- Died: September 21, 2008 (aged 92); Winston-Salem, North Carolina, U.S.

Mary Ellen Garber (April 16, 1916 – September 21, 2008) was an American sportswriter, recognized as a pioneer among women in sports journalism. She received over 40 writing awards and numerous honors in a sports-writing career that spanned seven decades, the most prestigious of which was the 2005 Associated Press Sports Editors (APSE) Red Smith Award. Garber, the first woman to win the APSE award, also became the first woman to be inducted into the U.S. Basketball Writers Association Hall of Fame in 2002.

== Life, career, and honors ==
Mary Garber was born in New York City in 1916, but relocated to Winston-Salem, North Carolina, with her family in 1924. At the age of eight, she had two passions: journalism and sports. She not only read the sports page, she played tackle football for the Buena Vista Devils. As she matured, her five-foot, ninety-pound frame limited her to softball and tennis, but her love of sports never slackened. As a child, Garber, a huge Knute Rockne fan, wrote letters to Notre Dame football players.

Garber graduated from Hollins College in Virginia, in 1938, with one goal: to become a newspaper reporter. In an interview with local historian Frank Tursi, Garber said, "I never considered anything else. But never at any time did I think about being a sportswriter".

In 1940, the aspiring reporter entered journalism as the society editor at the Twin City Sentinel. America's entry into World War II created a vacuum in the newspaper that enabled her to become a general assignment reporting. Later in 1944, when the high school sports stringer at the paper graduated and enlisted in the U.S. Navy, Garber filled his slot. At the end of the war, she moved back to general assignment reporting but not for long. After a year of dogging sports editor Carlton Bryd for sports assignments, both Bryd and managing editor, Nady Cates, agreed that Garber belonged on the sports beat.

In 1946, Garber joined the sports department and never left. Two things distinguished her career. For 30 years, she was the only female sportswriter in the Winston-Salem (ACC Conference) region and one of the few in the country. Also, when she entered sports journalism in 1946, she started covering the two black high schools in the Winston-Salem/Forsyth County region, Atkins High School and Carver High School.

She also covered Winston-Salem State University, a black university. Her appearance at those schools launched her as an advocate for black athletes and coaches in the segregated region. Prior to her, both Winston-Salem papers, the Twin Cities Sentinel and the Winston-Salem Journal, used school correspondents to call in game results.

As a woman, Garber was not allowed into team locker rooms and had to wait outside the door, hoping to get quotes from coaches and players. At North Carolina State games, a security guard named John Baker hauled athletes out of the lockers to make sure she got her quotes.

When the Winston-Salem Journal acquired the Sentinel in the 1980s, Garber moved with it. She retired from the Journal in 1986, but continued working part-time until 2002.

A girls' high school basketball tournament, called the Mary Garber Holiday Tip-Off Classic, is named in Garber's honor and has been held annually in Winston-Salem since 1989.

In 1990, the Atlantic Coast Conference established the Mary Garber Award, to honor the top female athlete in the ACC each year.

In 1998, Garber received the Mel Greenberg Media Award.

In 2002 Garber became the first woman to be inducted into the U.S. Basketball Writers Association Hall of Fame.

In 2005 Garber became the first woman to receive the Associated Press Sports Editors (APSE) Red Smith Award.

In 2006, the Association of Women in Sports Media (AWSM) renamed its Pioneer Award the Mary Garber Pioneer Award.

In May 2008, Garber was inducted into the Hall of Fame of the National Sportscasters and Sportswriters Association.

Garber recounted her life and career in a series of interviews for the Washington Press Club Foundation's Women in Journalism Oral History Project.

Garber died on September 21, 2008, in Winston-Salem, North Carolina.
