= Red Smith Award =

American sports journalism award

- Awarded for: "Major contributions to sports journalism"
- Presented by: Associated Press Sports Editors (APSE)

History
- First award: 1981
- First winner: Red Smith
- Most recent: Dan Shaughnessy (2026)
- Website: Official website

The Red Smith Award is awarded by the Associated Press Sports Editors (APSE) organization for outstanding contributions to sports journalism. Unlike many journalism awards, it is open to both writers and editors.

Winners of the award are traditionally announced in April and it is bestowed in June at the annual APSE convention. It is named in honor of Walter Wellesley "Red" Smith (1905–1982) whose sportswriting career spanned 1927 to 1982, and was the first recipient of the award in 1981.

== List of winners ==
Year	Winner	Organization(s)	Ref.			
Year	Winner	Organization(s)	Ref.	1981	Red Smith	New York Herald Tribune, The New York Times
1982	Jim Murray	Los Angeles Times				
1983	Shirley Povich	The Washington Post				
1984	Fred Russell	Nashville Banner				
1985	Blackie Sherrod	The Dallas Morning News				
1986	Si Burick	Dayton Daily News				
1987	Will Grimsley	Associated Press				
1988	Furman Bisher	The Atlanta Journal				
1989	Edwin Pope	Miami Herald				
1990	Dave Smith‡	The Dallas Morning News				
1991	Dave Kindred	The National Sports Daily				
1992	Ed Storin	Miami Herald				
1993	Tom McEwen	The Tampa Tribune				
1994	Dave Anderson	The New York Times				
1995	Richard Sandler†	Newsday				
1996	Bill Dwyre‡	Los Angeles Times				
1997	Jerome Holtzman	Chicago Tribune				
1998	Sam Lacy	Baltimore Afro-American				
1999	Bud Collins	The Boston Globe				
2000	Jerry Izenberg	The Newark Star-Ledger				
2001	John Steadman†	The Baltimore Sun				
2002	Dick Schaap†	ESPN, The Sports Reporters				
2003	George Solomon	The Washington Post				
2004	Jimmy Cannon†	New York Post, New York Journal American				
2005	Mary Garber	Winston-Salem Journal				
2006	Joe McGuff†‡	The Kansas City Star				
2007	Van McKenzie†‡	Orlando Sentinel				
2008	W. C. Heinz†	The New York Sun				
2009	Vince Doria‡	ESPN				
2010	Mitch Albom	Detroit Free Press				
2011	Bill Millsaps‡	Richmond Times-Dispatch				
2012	Frank Deford	Sports Illustrated				
2013	Dan Jenkins	Sports Illustrated				
2014	Wendell Smith†	Pittsburgh Courier, Chicago Herald-American, Chicago Sun-Times				
2015	Bob Ryan	The Boston Globe				
2016	Leigh Montville	The Boston Globe, Sports Illustrated				
2017	Henry Freeman‡	USA Today				
2018	Terry R. Taylor	Associated Press				
2019	Sandy Rosenbush	The Washington Post, Sports Illustrated				
2020	Christine Brennan	USA Today				
2021	Sally Jenkins	The Washington Post				
2022	Leon Carter	Sports Journalism Institute				
2023	Claire Smith	Hartford Courant, The New York Times, The Philadelphia Inquirer				
2024	Bill Plaschke	Los Angeles Times				
2025	Thomas Boswell	The Washington Post				
2026	Dan Shaughnessy	The Boston Globe				

† Awarded posthumously
‡ Served as president of APSE
