= Terry R. Taylor =

American sports editor (1952–2023)

Terry Rosalind Taylor (October 4, 1952 – November 14, 2023) was an American sports editor. She was the first woman to be a sports editor for the Associated Press. Taylor died from cancer at her home in Paoli, Pennsylvania, on November 14, 2023, at the age of 71.

== Early life and education ==
Terry Taylor was born in Valley Forge, Pennsylvania. Her mother was an administrative assistant for the Internal Revenue Service.

She received a bachelor's degree in journalism from Temple University where she also worked at the campus newspaper.

== Career ==
She worked at The Charlotte News and later joined the Associated Press in 1977.

== Honors ==
Taylor was the 2016 Mary Garber Pioneer Award recipient for the Association for Women in Sports Media. She was given the Red Smith Award during 2018 from the Associated Press Sports Editors.
