= Joe McGuff =

American journalist (1926–2006)

McGuff

Joseph T. McGuff (August 15, 1926 – February 4, 2006) was an American journalist, author, and newspaper editor.

== Life ==
Born in Tulsa, Oklahoma, he attended Marquette University and served briefly in the United States Army before being discharged due to asthma. After first working for the Tulsa World, he joined the staff of The Kansas City Star in 1948. He became sports editor in 1966 and was named editor of the Star in 1986.

After the Kansas City Athletics departed for Oakland, California at the close of the 1967 season, McGuff played a major role in ensuring that Kansas City would gain a new franchise – the Kansas City Royals – in the 1969 expansion. He was named to the writers' wing of the Baseball Hall of Fame in 1984, receiving the J. G. Taylor Spink Award. He served as president of the Associated Press Sports Editors and also the Baseball Writers' Association of America.

Named as Missouri's outstanding sportswriter five times by the National Association of Sportscasters and Sportswriters, he was chosen to throw out the first ball for the seventh game of the 1985 World Series between the Kansas City Royals and the St. Louis Cardinals. He was also the author of Why Me? Why Not Joe McGuff?.

A longtime civic leader, McGuff was among the lay Catholics who served on an independent review board in the 1990s to investigate allegations of sexual abuse in the Diocese of Kansas City-St. Joseph, with McGuff acting as board chairman. He also was a voter for the Baseball Hall of Fame

McGuff was diagnosed with amyotrophic lateral sclerosis (Lou Gehrig's disease) in 1999. A resident of Prairie Village, Kansas, he died there at age 79, survived by his wife Kay and six children. There is a legend that in his final days he dictated his Hall of Fame vote to his wife.

In 2006, McGuff was posthumously honored by the Associated Press Sports Editors, who awarded him the Red Smith Award, the AP's top sports writing honor.
