= Tom McEwen (sportswriter) =

Thomas Massey McEwen (March 16, 1923 – June 5, 2011) was an American sportswriter who was born and spent most of his life in Florida. He was a graduate of the University of Florida, and is best known for being the popular sports editor at The Tampa Tribune daily newspaper in Tampa, Florida from 1962 until 1992. After retiring as editor, he continued to write a regular column and occasional articles for the print version of the Tribune until 2001, then for the online version of the newspaper (tbo.com) until shortly before his death in 2011.

McEwen was the sports editor for Tampa's primary newspaper during an era of growth for The Tampa Tribune, the Tampa Bay area's professional sports profile, and Tampa in general. Some credit McEwen with being among the most influential newspaper sports journalists of his day, affecting major development for local sports and helping to facilitate the establishment of expansion sports franchises in the Tampa Bay area, most notably the Tampa Bay Buccaneers, Tampa Bay Rays, and Tampa Bay Lightning, and for being a supporter and chronicler of Florida's college sports programs, particularly at the University of Florida and, later, the University of South Florida.

== Early life and education ==
McEwen was born in Tampa in 1923 and grew up in rural Wauchula, Florida, where the cattle and citrus industries were most prominent. He followed his older brother James Milton "Red" McEwen to the University of Florida. While in college, Tom McEwen was the editor of The Alligator, the university's student newspaper, and earned a degree in journalism while his brother Red was a star on the Florida Gators football team and earned a degree in law. (Red McEwen later became a well-known lawyer and state attorney in Tampa and a booster of the University of South Florida's sports programs after the school was founded in the late 1950s.)

== Military service ==
It was from the University of Florida in 1944 that he was called to military service in the Pacific. He was trained at Fort Hood and arrived in the Philippines at the end of the occupation by the Japanese. "He entered as a private and exited as a captain while serving in the Pacific theater as a platoon leader with the U.S. Army's 785th Tank Battalion. Later, he served as a prison officer of Prisoner of War Camp No. 1 in the Philippines, running a camp that included 2,000 prisoners. He retained a military tie in the Army reserves and then the U.S. National Guard until his retirement from the Florida Guard in 1976, as lieutenant colonel. He received the Florida Order of Merit for his service in the guard." Coming home from the Philippines, McEwen wrote sports for the Fort Myers News Press and the St. Petersburg Times in the 1950s. He was by the Tampa Times in June 1958, and then by The Tampa Tribune in April 1962.

== The Tampa Tribune ==
McEwen became sports editor for the Tribune in 1962, "when he took over a department with a staff of seven." McEwen wrote "The Morning After" column six days a week, and a weekly question and answer column, "Hey Tom!," which usually ran on Sundays. McEwen often made appearances as a speaker and developed a large network of civic minded local community leaders, nationally prominent athletes and team owners, and other influential people across the sports world. He is credited with helping Tampa gain acceptance in the top level of professional sports, particularly in the awarding of the National Football League franchise which became the Tampa Bay Buccaneers. He also wrote many columns about the University of Florida's football program's coaches and players. Former Florida player and coach Steve Spurrier credits McEwen with helping him win the Heisman Trophy in 1966 and convincing Tampa Bay Bandits owner John F. Bassett to hire Spurrier for his first head coaching job in 1983. McEwen's first published book, The Gators: A Story of Florida Football, traces the history of UF's football program from its beginnings until 1974, when the book was written.

It is estimated that McEwen wrote over 10,000 columns and articles, and he traveled to many of the major sporting events of his day, both domestically and internationally. His column sometimes covered subjects other than sports, such as eulogies of someone of note or a loved one, and sometimes began with a "Breakfast Bonus" section in which he described a large southern-style breakfast in detail before turning the discussion back to sports. When he retired from his post as sports editor in 1992, the department had grown from 7 employees to 57. Even after his official retirement, McEwen continued to write for the Tribune and produced a collection of his works.

== Recognition and legacy ==
McEwen has been recognized for his sportswriting as well as being recipient of multiple awards. He won the Florida Sportswriter of the Year award 19 times, between the years 1962 and 1993 and in 2000, was the recipient of the Dick McCann Memorial Award for long and distinguished reporting in the field of pro football in the Canton NFL Hall of Fame ceremonies, presented by Pro Football Writers of America. He served as president of the Football Writers Association of America from 1973 to 1974. And in 1993, the Associated Press Sports Editors presented McEwen with the Red Smith Award.

Locally, the press boxes at the original Tampa Stadium and Amalie Arena were named for McEwen. The street in front of Raymond James Stadium, today's home of the Tampa Bay Buccaneers, bears his name. McEwen was honored as a distinguished graduate by the University of Florida and an athletic scholarship was endowed in his name. He conducted seminars in sportswriting at the American Press Institute at Columbia University. His final tribute was for a doctor of letters given in 2011 by Saint Leo University, a Catholic university 35 miles north of Tampa. In 2012, the Tom McEwen Family Foundation was established to raise money for scholarships for aspiring sports journalists.
