= Jim Murray (sportswriter) =

American sportswriter (1919–1998)

- Born: December 29, 1919; Hartford, Connecticut, U.S.
- Died: August 16, 1998 (aged 78); Los Angeles, California, U.S.
- Resting place: Holy Cross Cemetery, Culver City
- Education: Trinity College, 1943
- Occupation: Sportswriter
- Employer: Los Angeles Times (1961–1998)
- Spouse(s): Geraldine Murray (m. 1945; died 1984) Linda McCoy (m. 1997)
- Children: 1 daughter, 3 sons
- Writing career
- Notable awards: J. G. Taylor Spink Award (1987); Pulitzer Prize for Commentary (1989)

James Patrick Murray (December 29, 1919 – August 16, 1998) was an American sportswriter. He worked at the Los Angeles Times from 1961 until his death in 1998, and his column was nationally syndicated.

Among his many achievements was winning the NSSA's Sportswriter of the Year award 14 times (12 of those consecutively). In 1990, he won a Pulitzer Prize for Commentary for his 1989 columns, and the Baseball Writers' Association of America awarded him the J. G. Taylor Spink Award in 1987. Cited as an influence by countless sports journalists, Murray was a fixture at the L.A. Times for 37 years.

After he won the Pulitzer in 1990, Murray modestly said he thought the prize winner should have had "to bring down a government or expose major graft or give advice to prime ministers. Correctly quoting Los Angeles Dodgers manager Tommy Lasorda shouldn't merit a Pulitzer Prize." He was offered $1 million to join The National Sports Daily, but declined.

== Career ==
Prior to his tenure with the Los Angeles Times, Murray was a writer and columnist for Sports Illustrated from 1953 to 1961 and Time magazine from 1948 to 1955. He was also a reporter for the Los Angeles Examiner from 1944 to 1948, the New Haven (CT) Register and The Hartford Times. A native of Hartford, Connecticut, Murray graduated from that city's Trinity College in 1943.

Murray was noted for his great, albeit occasionally caustic, sense of humor and ability to turn a phrase, including the following: he wrote of the Indianapolis 500 automobile race, "Gentlemen, start your coffins"; that baseball player Rickey Henderson "has a strike zone the size of Hitler's heart"; and that UCLA basketball coach John Wooden was "so square he was divisible by four."

Although eventually afflicted with blindness, Murray continued covering and writing about sports as long as he was able. He wrote a column from the Del Mar racetrack for the L.A. Times on the day before he died.

The Jim Murray Memorial Foundation, created in 1999 by Murray's widow, Linda McCoy-Murray, raises money for journalism scholarships for college journalists. Currently 31 universities participate annually in a national essay competition in which the winners receive $5,000.00 scholarships.

In 1964, he received the Golden Plate Award of the American Academy of Achievement.

He was inducted in the National Sportscasters and Sportswriters Association Hall of Fame in 1978.

In 1982, Murray was honored by the Associated Press Sports Editors, who awarded him the Red Smith Award, which is America's most prestigious sports writing honor. For his contribution to sports in Los Angeles, he was honored with a Los Angeles Memorial Coliseum "Court of Honor" plaque by the Coliseum commissioners. A testimonial dinner in Beverly Hills was held for Murray after he won his Pulitzer Prize in 1990, at which the guests included many show-business and sports luminaries, as well as Nancy and Ronald Reagan.

Murray's funeral, at St. Martin of Tours Catholic Church in Brentwood, was attended by a variety of notable sports figures including Marcus Allen, Elgin Baylor, Al Davis, Rafer Johnson, Chris McCarron, Peter O'Malley, Luc Robitaille, Bill Russell, Donald Sterling, Danny Sullivan, and Mike Tyson. The tribute was delivered by his longtime friend, sportscaster Jack Whitaker.

Murray is buried in Holy Cross Cemetery in Culver City; a Golden Palm Star on the Palm Springs Walk of Stars was dedicated posthumously to him in 2008.

== Works ==
- Jim Murray: The Autobiography (1995)

The following are collections of Jim Murray articles:

- The Jim Murray Reader (2011)
- Last of the Best (1998)
- The Great Ones (1991)
- The Jim Murray Collection (1988)
- The Best of Jim Murray (1965)

By other authors:

- Quotable Jim Murray: The Literary Wit, Wisdom, and Wonder of a Distinguished American Sports Columnist, by Linda McCoy-Murray (2003)
