= Women's Basketball Coaches Association =

American sports organization in Georgia

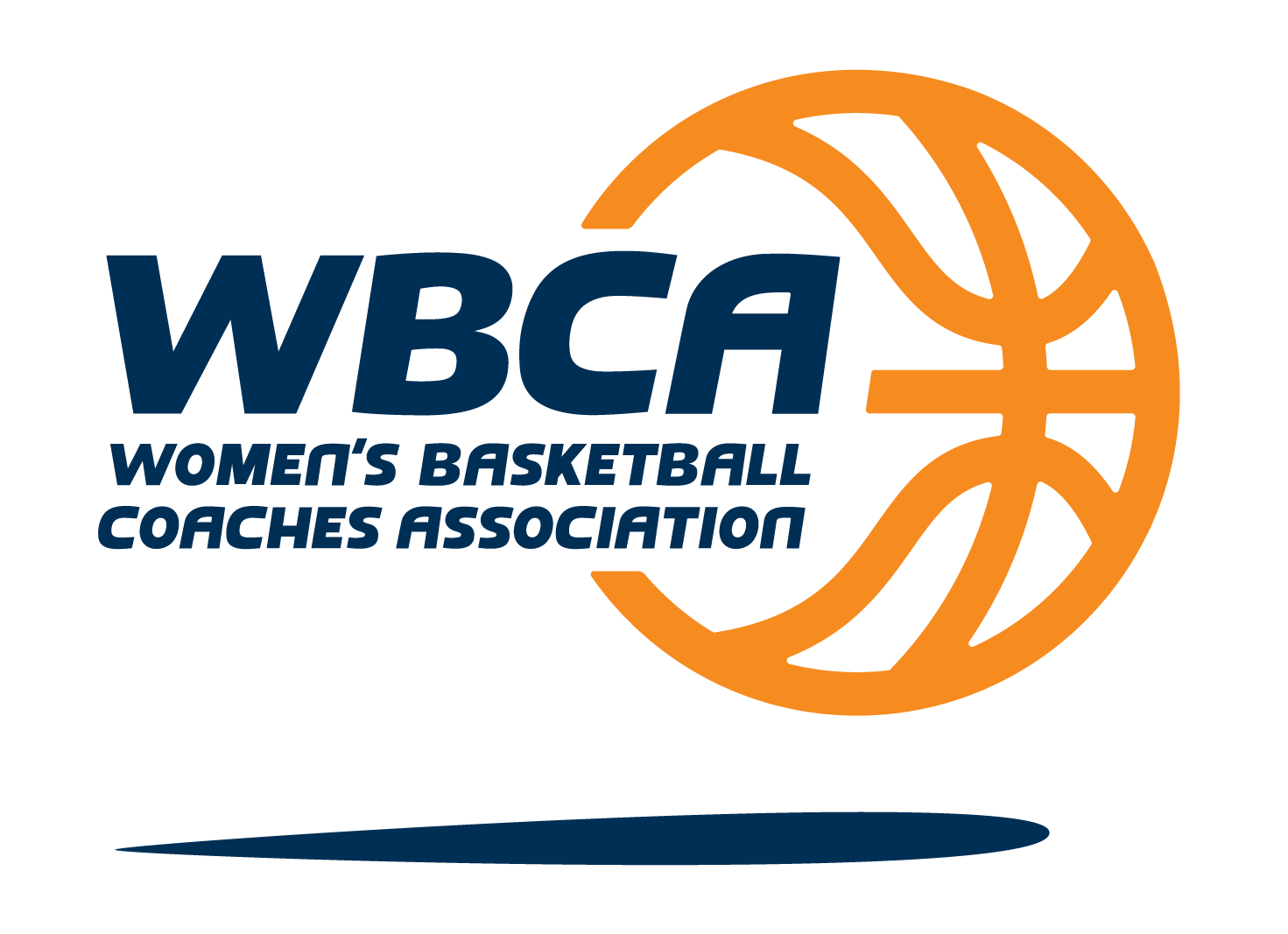
- Abbreviation: WBCA
- Location: 4646 Lawrenceville Hwy. Lilburn, Georgia
- Executive Director: Danielle Donehew
- Website: wbca.org

The Women's Basketball Coaches Association is an association of coaches of women's basketball teams at all levels.

The organization was formed in 1981, with the goal of addressing the needs of women's basketball coaches.

The mission of the WBCA is:

...to promote women's basketball by unifying coaches at all levels to develop a reputable identity for the sport of women's basketball and to foster and promote the development of the game in all of its aspects as a sport for women and girls

The WBCA provides education for coaches, and promotes the coaching profession with awards for coaches and players. While many of the awards are related to basketball activities, the WBCA recognizes the need for academic as well as athletic excellence and recognizes academic excellence with its Academic Top 25 Team Honor Roll.

== History ==
An organizational meeting was held at the Olympic Festival in Syracuse, New York, in 1981. Jill Hutchison was named the first president of the organization, before the organization even had a name. Later that year, Betty Jaynes was named the interim executive director of the organization. Jaynes was the head coach of the James Madison University women's basketball team, but she resigned her position to take on the responsibilities of the WBCA. She served as the chief executive officer until retiring in November 2000, passing over the position to Beth Bass. Bass joined the organization as executive director in 1997, and assumed the role of CEO after the retirement of Jaynes, who continues to serve as a consultant to the WBCA.

== Membership ==
The membership is open to virtually everyone, including institutions. The main membership category is "active" comprising the coaching staff of NCAA Divisions I, II, and III, as well as NAIA, USCAA, junior college and community college coaches. In addition, there are membership categories for high school, AAU and recreational league coaches, as well as coaches on professional teams. Institutions are allowed to become members. Finally, there are affiliate categories for "administrators", "industry professionals" (including media), players, and "fans" (including anyone who is a friend of women's basketball). An "international" membership category is available for individuals, regardless of category, living outside the U.S. and its territories. All members are eligible to attend the WBCA's annual convention except for high school and college players.

The WBCA membership is considerably broader than that of the WBCA's men's counterpart, the National Association of Basketball Coaches:

- Coaches at professional teams are ineligible for any level of NABC membership unless they have spent enough years as active members in college basketball to be eligible for "associate" membership.
- The "active" NABC membership consists solely of head coaches and full-time assistants at NCAA and NAIA institutions.
- Coaches at four-year institutions not affiliated with the NCAA or NAIA are ineligible for NABC membership at any level. By contrast, active WBCA membership is open even to coaches at four-year institutions unaffiliated with any national association.
- Men's coaches at two-year schools are in the NABC's third-tier category of "activity" membership. By contrast, women's coaches at the same type of schools are eligible for active WBCA membership.
- The NABC only offers fourth-level "affiliate" membership to directors of basketball operations, and only if they work at four-year institutions. The WBCA considers individuals in the same role at women's basketball programs eligible for active membership, and also extends this privilege to those holding the position at two-year institutions.
- While certain administrators in men's basketball are eligible for "affiliate" NABC membership, eligibility is far more restrictive than the WBCA "administrator" category.
- The NABC does not offer any level of membership to institutions, players, or fans.

== Events and initiatives ==
The WBCA sponsors a variety of events throughout the year. The flagship event is the annual convention, coinciding both in timing and location with the Final Four weekend of the NCAA Women's Division I Basketball Championship. Other sponsored events occur throughout the year, some in conjunction with the annual convention, others at different times.

=== Convention ===
The primary function of the convention is to facilitate business meetings, such as board of directors meetings, and other administrative meetings. The program also typically includes panel presentations including members and outside speakers, workshops, awards and outside exhibitors.

=== WBCA High School All-America Game ===
The WBCA formerly sponsored an All America game, inviting twenty of the nation's top high school female basketball players. Only seniors in high school were eligible. In addition to the twenty players invited to play in the game, an additional twenty players were named as Honorable Mention All-Americans. The invited players were divided into two teams, and played an all star game in the same city as the Final Four (although sometimes at a different venue). The game was typically scheduled for the off day between the semifinals and championship game of the NCAA Division I women's basketball tournament.

=== So You Want To Be A Coach ===
The WBCA sponsors a program aimed at ethnically minority female basketball players who show an interest in becoming coaches. The program is organized in parallel with the annual convention, at the same locations, and includes a "two and a half day crash course in what the coaching profession entails". Supporters of the program include some of the major names in the sport such as Hall of Fame coach C. Vivian Stringer

=== WBCA Pink Zone ===
The major charitable initiative of the WBCA encourages coaches to raise awareness of breast cancer in various ways. Each year, a number of women's basketball games are designed Pink Zone games. One or both of the teams wear pink uniforms. The event is usually coupled with a money raising effort; the proceeds are dedicated to the Kay Yow/WBCA Cancer Fund, in partnership with The V Foundation. The NCAA participates with their "Calling for a Cure" campaign. As part of that campaign, the referees in NCAA women's basketball games use pink whistles during the designated Pink Zone dates.

== Awards ==
The WBCA sponsors a number of awards, with the intention to promote the development of the game. Awards are given for overall achievements by players and coaches, as well as broadcasters, administration, and academic results.

=== Players awards ===
==== Player of the Year Awards ====
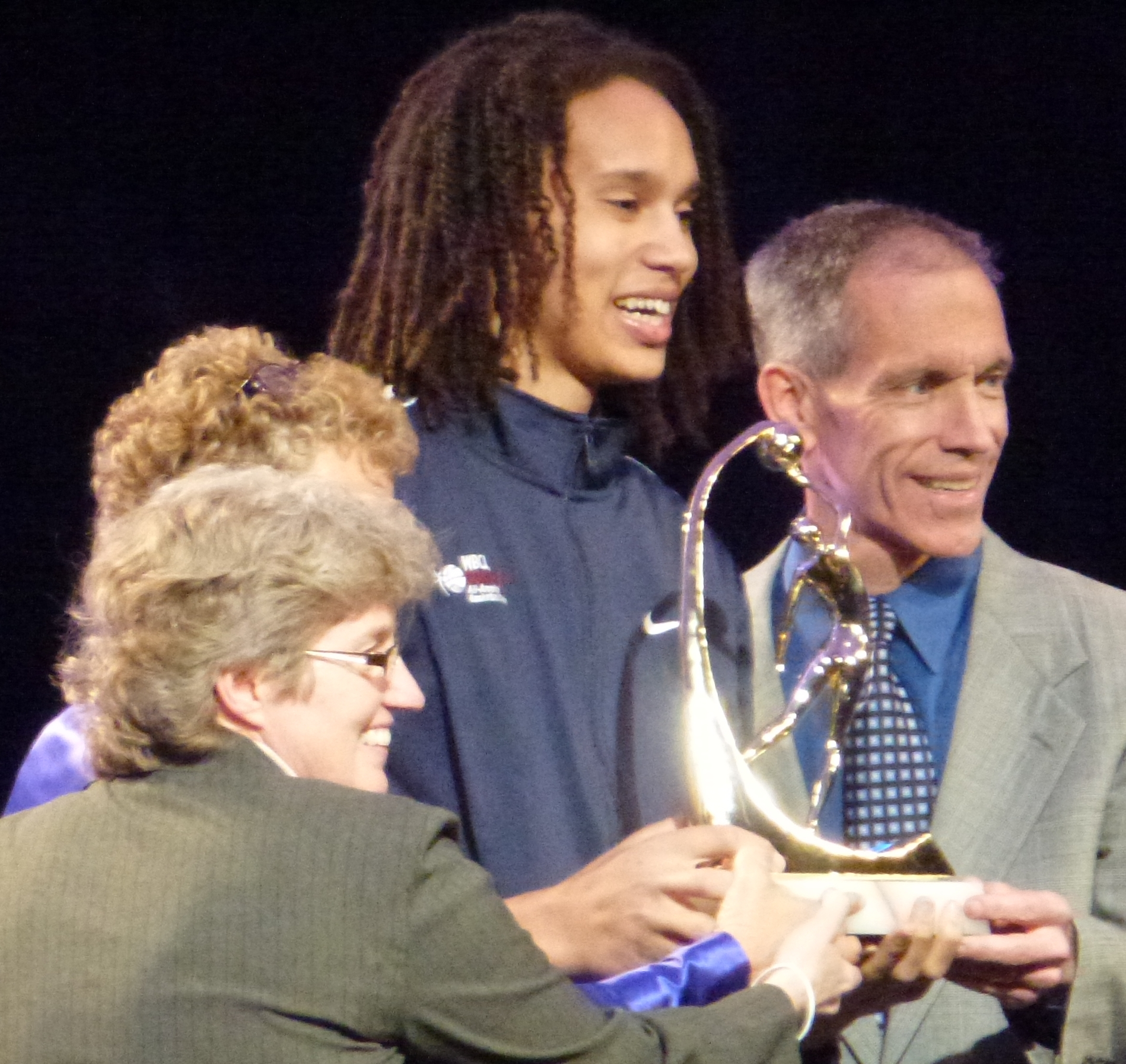
Brittney Griner accepting Wade Trophy

The State Farm Wade Trophy is awarded annually to "the best women's college basketball player in National Collegiate Athletic Association (NCAA) Division I".

The State Farm/WBCA Players of the Year award is the counterpart to the Wade trophy for the best women's basketball player in:

- NCAA Division II
- NCAA Division III
- NAIA
- Junior College/Community College
- High School

The Defensive Player of the Year is awarded to the best defensive collegiate Division I player.

The Frances Pomeroy Naismith Award was awarded to the most outstanding senior Division I female basketball player 5 feet 8 inches (1.73 m) or shorter (the maximum height was previously 5 feet 6 inches or 1.68 m).

==== All-America Teams ====
The WBCA selects the top ten players in each of five divisions:

1. NCAA Division I
2. NCAA Division II
3. NCAA Division III
4. NAIA
5. JC/CC (Junior College/Community College)

=== Coaches Awards ===
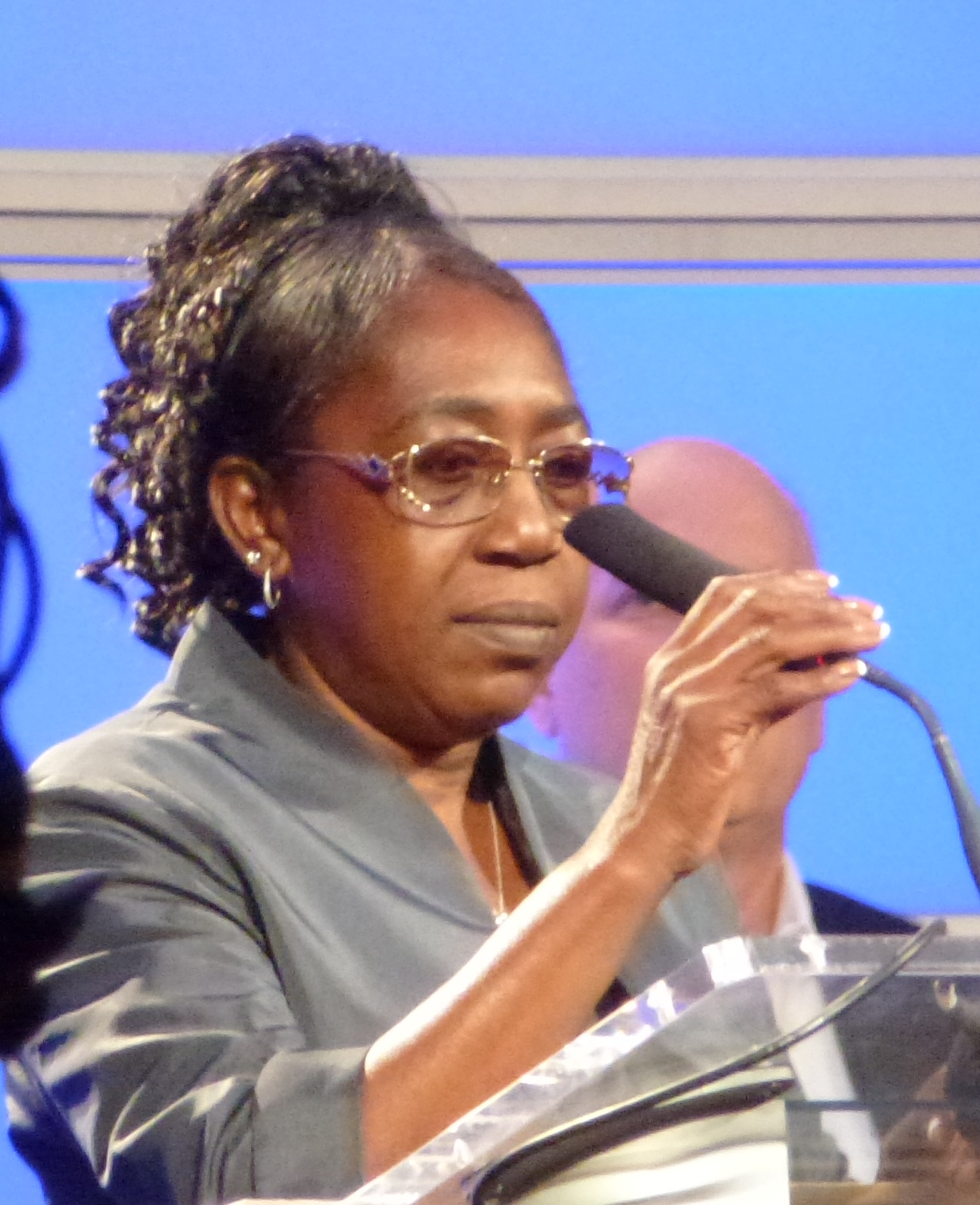
Marcia Pinder 2012 WBCA HS Coach of the Year

The WBCA presents an award to the National Coach of the Year in each of six divisions:

1. NCAA Division I
2. NCAA Division II
3. NCAA Division III
4. NAIA
5. JC/CC (Junior College/Community College)
6. High School

The WBCA presents an award to the Rookie Coach of the Year. The award is named in honor of Maggie Dixon, the former coach of the Army women's basketball team, who died shortly after competing her rookie season as a coach.

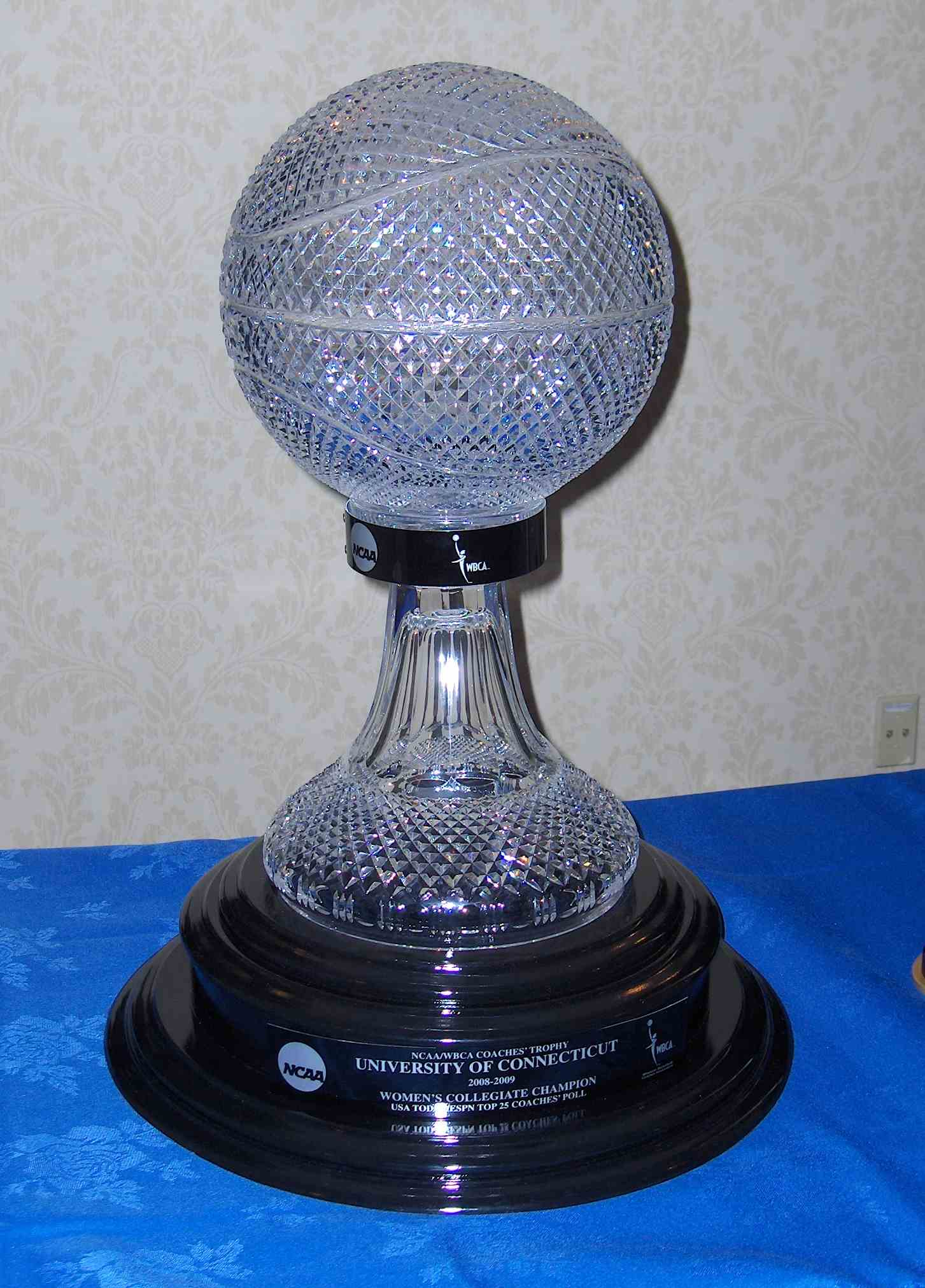
NCAA/WBCA Coaches' Trophy

The NCAA and WBCA jointly award a Coaches trophy, presented to the team that finishes first in the USA TODAY ESPN Division I Top 25 Coaches' Poll.

The WBCA presents the Carol Eckman Award, given annually since 1986, to the women's college basketball active coach who "best demonstrates the character of the late Carol Eckman, the mother of the collegiate women's basketball national championship". The award is named for former women's head coach Carol Eckman, a head coach best known for establishing the first National Invitational Women's Intercollegiate Basketball Tournament in 1969.

In the 2015–16 season, the WBCA announced a new award recognizing the young coaches in the sport. This recognition was created to honor thirty of the up-and-coming women's basketball coaches age 30 and under in the sport at all levels of the game.″ In 2016, the WBCA also began awarding an Assistant Coach of the Year award.

=== Academic Awards ===
The WBCA recognizes the need for academic as well as athletic excellence, and promotes academic excellence with its Academic Top 25 Team Honor Roll, recognizing the top 25 teams, as measured by overall GPA, in each of five divisions:

1. NCAA Division I
2. NCAA Division II
3. NCAA Division III
4. NAIA
5. JC/CC (Junior College/Community College)

=== Media Awards ===
The WBCA presents an annual scholarship award, The Robin Roberts/WBCA Broadcasting Scholarship, to a female basketball player intending to pursue graduate work and a career in sports journalism. Past recipients include Stacey Dales.

The WBCA presents an annual award to a member of the media who "has best displayed a commitment to women's basketball and to advancing the role of the media in promoting the women's game".

The inaugural award (1991) was presented to Mel Greenberg. In subsequent years, the award was named the Mel Greenberg Media Award.

== See also ==
- National Association of Basketball Coaches—the counterpart association of men's basketball coaches
- Women's Basketball Hall of Fame
- Naismith College Coach of the Year
- List of college women's basketball coaches with 600 wins

== External ==
- Official website
