= Broadcast delay =

Practice of intentionally delaying a live broadcast

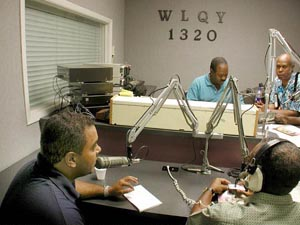
Many US radio talk shows use broadcast delay to avoid FCC penalties

In radio and television, broadcast delay or tape delay is an intentional delay when broadcasting live material, technically referred to as a deferred live. Such a delay may be to prevent mistakes or unacceptable content from being broadcast. Longer delays lasting several hours can also be introduced so that the material is aired at a later scheduled time (such as the prime time hours, or in a different time zone) to maximize viewership. Tape delays lasting several hours can also be edited down to remove filler material or to trim a broadcast to the network's desired run time for a broadcast slot, but this is not always the case.

== Usage ==
A short delay is often used to prevent profanity, bloopers, nudity, or other undesirable material from making it to air. In this instance, it is often referred to as a "seven-second delay" or "profanity delay". Longer delays, however, may also be introduced, often to allow a show to air at the same time for the local market as is sometimes done with nationally broadcast programs in countries with multiple time zones. Considered as time shifting, that is often achieved by a "tape delay", using a video tape recorder, modern digital video recorders, or other similar technology.

Tape delay may also refer to the process of broadcasting an event at a later scheduled time because a scheduling conflict prevents a live telecast, or a broadcaster seeks to maximize ratings by airing an event in a certain timeslot. That can also be done because of time constraints of certain portions, usually those that do not affect the outcome of the show, are edited out, or the availability of hosts or other key production staff only at certain times of the day, and it is generally applicable for cable television programs. Occasionally, local television stations delay live broadcasts to later that same evening due to other local sports or event coverage, or in breaking news and severe weather situations.

In countries that span multiple time zones and have influential domestic eastern regions, such as Australia, Canada, Mexico, and the United States, television networks usually delay the entirety of their schedule for stations in the west, so prime time programming can be time shifted to air in local primetime hours to improve accessibility and viewership. Although Mexico and Canada have now regularly televised their live programs in real time simultaneously across all of their territories, in the U.S., "east" feeds usually target the Eastern and Central time zones, while "west" feeds are usually oriented towards the Pacific time zone. As a result, until today, many live programs, such as music and talent competition shows, are usually tape delayed for the western half of the country and aired as-live (although they may include edits to streamline the broadcast or resolve technical faults). Australian network television schedule is largely patterned from the U.S. format.

In countries that span multiple time zones and are the most populous in their western or central regions, like Brazil, Russia and Indonesia, all television schedules nationwide are simultaneous with their broadcast sources, enabling full nationwide live telecasts regardless of time zones (although Russia conducts separate live primetime newscast versions for each range of time zones in that country). The continents of Europe and Africa, which both fall in the same range of time zones, are receptive to each other's live telecasts, while most of Asia from India eastwards, which includes China alongside the most populous time zone in the world, also receive simultaneous live telecasts within those cluster of regions.

International tape delays of live global events, intended by major television networks, dominated world television until the early 2010s. For example, during the Sydney Olympics in 2000 and the Beijing Olympics in 2008, daytime events were occurring at early morning hours in the Americas, Africa, and Europe but were aired in the afternoon and evening hours live entirely in Asia, Australia, and Oceania. That made some broadcasters show high-profile events twice (live and then rebroadcast during prime time), but others withheld the same event to be broadcast solely during prime time. Often, tape-delaying of those events would mean editing them down for time considerations, highlighting what the broadcaster feels are the most interesting portions of the event, or advertising, resulting in reduced desired TV coverage for the given multiple sporting events.

However, since many live events became available via social media in the late 2000s, tape delays have become increasingly irrelevant because of live television's resurgence as a broadcast format. Since the mid-2010s, several high-profile entertainment programs with huge live global audiences like the Academy Awards, Golden Globe Awards, Grammy Awards, Emmy Awards and Tony Awards, yearly specials like the Miss Universe and Miss World pageants, and major sporting events like the Olympic Games, FIFA World Cup and the National Football League's Super Bowl, air to totality live on both television and the internet virtually all across the world's time zones in and out of their countries of origin. In addition, television networks nowadays mandate prime time rebroadcasts (featuring edits as desired by broadcasters) for regions that are not covered by the original live primetime broadcasting and previously and solely relied on delayed telecasts on prime time among these otherwise live events.

In certain professional competitions, like chess, broadcast delays may be used to prevent cheating or other irregularities.

== History ==
The radio station WKAP in Allentown, Pennsylvania, introduced a tape delay system consisting of an external playback head, which was spaced far enough away from the record head to produce a six-second delay. A system of rollers guided the tape over the playback head before it wound up on the take up reel. This system was introduced in 1952, when WKAP started a talk show called Open Mic. It is believed that this was the first time a telephone call-in show was broadcast with the telephone conversation "live" on the air. The FCC rules at the time prohibited the broadcasting of a live telephone conversation. However, there was no rule prohibiting a taped playback of a telephone call, provided that a "beep" tone was heard by the caller every 15 seconds so that the caller knew he was being recorded. The six-second delay constituted a "taped" telephone conversation, thus complying with FCC regulations.

The broadcast profanity delay was invented by C. Frank Cordaro (July 13, 1919 – February 20, 1997), who was Chief Engineer of WKAP during the 1950s and early 1960s. Ogden Davies, then-General Manager of WKAP, assigned Cordaro the task of developing a device whereby profanity during a "live" conversation could be deleted by the radio talk show host before it was broadcast. This new device was to be used on the Open Mic radio talk show. The device Cordaro developed was the first tape delay system. WKAP was one of several stations owned by the Rahal brothers of West Virginia (later Rahal Communications). First tested and used at WKAP, this tape system for broadcast profanity delay was then installed at the other Rahal-owned radio stations. From the Rahal brothers' stations, the broadcast profanity delay went into common usage throughout the US.

John Nebel, who began a pioneering radio talk show in New York City in 1954, was one of the early users of a tape delay system that was invented by his engineer, Russell Tinklepaugh. Another announcer who was said to use a tape-delay was talk show pioneer Jerry Williams at WMEX in Boston in the late 1950s.

== Computerized delay ==
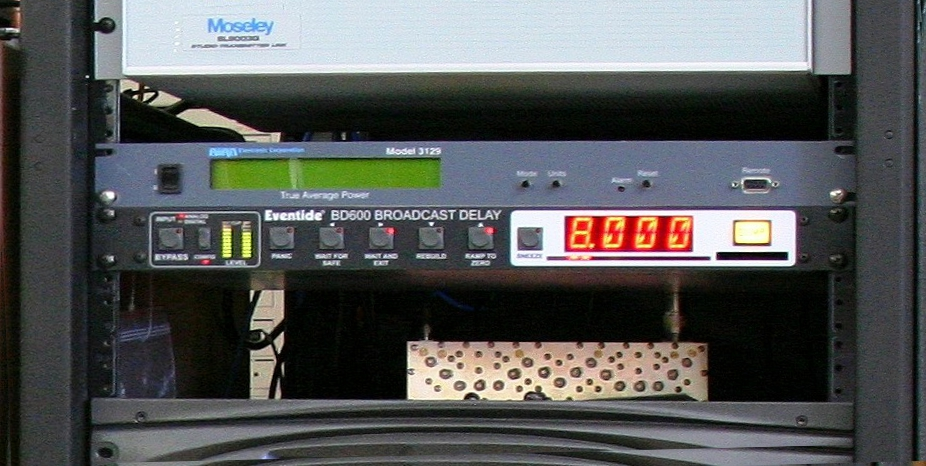
Eventide BD600 Broadcast Delay

In 1977, the capacity of RAM (random-access memory) had reached 16 kilobits per chip, enough to think about using computerized digital audio means to create a sufficient delay for content deletion. By storing audio digitally, it was possible to move a "virtual tape head" along recorded audio. Eventide, Inc. created the first digital broadcast delay for this purpose. The device (known colloquially as a "dump box") had a large "DUMP"/"DELAY DUMP" button that would bring the delay to zero, thus removing unwanted segments. In addition to this convenience, it would also "rebuild" the delay time by unnoticeably lengthening the normal pauses in spoken material. Thus, a minute or so later, the broadcaster would again have full delay, often leaving the listener unaware that material had been deleted.

In modern systems, a profanity delay can be a software module manually operated by a broadcast technician that puts a short delay (usually, 30 seconds) into the broadcast of live content. This gives the broadcaster time to censor the audio (and video) feed. This can be accomplished by cutting directly to a non-delayed feed, essentially jumping past the undesired moment (something that can be quite jarring to a viewer or listener). In other cases, dedicated hardware units similar to the original digital unit but with improved quality and editing capability can be used. These products can even "build up" delay with difficult program material such as music. Alternatively, a bleep noise or other substitute sound can be inserted. This is more difficult to do with live content, however, and more often appears on recorded material.

== See also ==
- Federal Communications Commission
- Pixelization
- Radio edit
- NBC Olympic broadcasts § Tape delay and formatting of coverage
