= Venus Mars Project =

American pop/rock duet

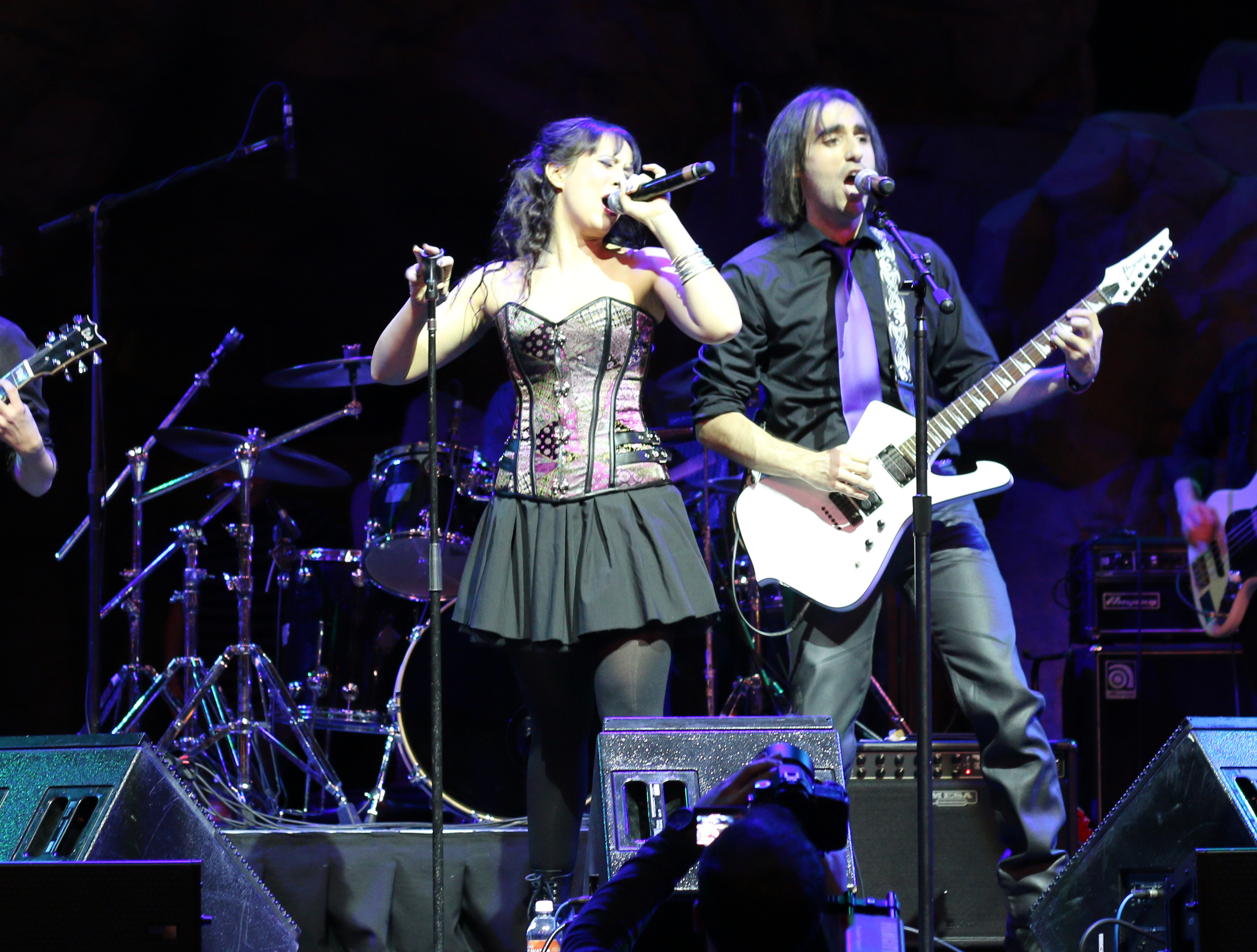
- Venus Mars Project, performing at the Wolf Den in the Mohegan Sun casino on November 11, 2015 in Uncasville, CT. From left to right: Jacyn Tremblay, Peter Tentindo.

Background information
- Origin: Boston, Massachusetts, United States
- Genres: Pop rock
- Years active: 2013—present
- Members: Jacyn Tremblay; Peter Tentindo
- Website: venusmarsproject.com

Venus Mars Project is an American pop/rock duet from Boston, Massachusetts known for their mix of classic rock edge and modern pop. The band consists of two members: Jacyn Tremblay (lead vocals) and Peter Tentindo (lead guitar, vocals). Jacyn is a singer/songwriter, formerly signed with Universal Motown Records as part of the Boston-based female pop/r&b vocal group Jada, and Peter is a professional guitarist, singer/songwriter, and teacher, formerly backing the lead singer of Survivor, Jimi Jamison.

As of July 2015, Venus Mars Project has four singles released on iTunes, Amazon, Google Play, and other music distribution services and online streaming channels including: Hands of Time (2013), Jump In (2014), Not Gonna Stop Me Now (2015), and #LaLaLaLove (2015).

In September 2015, the band opened for The Jacksons on their 50th Anniversary Tour at the North Shore Music Theatre in Beverly, Massachusetts. The following month, Venus Mars Project reached the finals of the Mohegan Sun "Locals Live" competition, where 16 bands and musicians across New England competed with a full band at the Wolf Den in the Mohegan Sun casino.

Venus Mars Project was nominated for a 2015 New England Music Award in the Best Pop Act category.

In August 2016, Venus Mars Project opened for Starship featuring Mickey Thomas (formerly Jefferson Airplane, formerly Jefferson Starship) at the Cabot Theatre in Beverly, Massachusetts.

Most recently, in February 2017, Venus Mars Project opened for The Gin Blossoms at the Cabot Theatre in Beverly, Massachusetts.

== Career ==
Jacyn Tremblay and Peter Tentindo first met when cast together in an original rock horror musical, Scary Mary and the Audio Corsette, for Salem's Halloween season of Haunted Happenings in 2012. After the show they formed Venus Mars Project and began writing songs and creating their own style of pop/rock music.

In 2013, the band released their first single, "Hands of Time", produced by Kenny Lewis of Mixed Emotions Music. An official music video for Hands of Time, directed and produced by Ben Consoli of BC Media Production, was launched soon after.

In 2014, the band released their second single, "Jump In", also produced by Kenny Lewis of Mixed Emotions Music. An official music video for "Jump In", also directed and produced by BC Media Production, was launched soon after.

In the spring of 2015, the band released their third single, "Not Gonna Stop Me Now", which was mixed by producer and engineer Bob St. John, whose credits include Extreme, Duran Duran, Collective Soul, and Dokken. The main theme of the song focuses on being a positive declaration about never backing down from a challenge.

In the summer of 2015, the band released their fourth single, "#LaLaLaLove", which was produced by producer and songwriter Anthony Resta, who has worked with artists such as Elton John, Collective Soul, and Duran Duran. This song is described as an edgy song about the reckless and whimsical feeling of falling in love.

== Live appearances ==
In August 2015, the band played an acoustic set opening for folk rock singer Jonathan Edwards.

In September 2015, the band played an acoustic set opening for The Jacksons on their 50th Anniversary Tour at the North Shore Music Theatre.

The band had multiple appearances in 2015 on the Jordan Rich radio talk show on WBZ Radio where they spoke about their music, songwriting, and musical influences.

In November 2015, the band played with a full band at the Mohegan Sun Wolf Den in the semi-finals as part of the casino's "Locals Live" competition.

In May 2016, Venus Mars Project opened for Kim Simmonds and Savoy Brown in May 2016 at the Larcom Theatre in Beverly, MA.

In August 2016, Venus Mars Project opened for Starship featuring Mickey Thomas (formerly Jefferson Airplane, formerly Jefferson Starship) at the Cabot Theatre in Beverly, Massachusetts.

In February 2017, Venus Mars Project opened for The Gin Blossoms at the Cabot Theatre in Beverly, Massachusetts.

== Musical style and influences ==
Venus Mars Project's music style has generally been regarded as pop/rock and has been known to be influenced by a classic rock edge and a modern pop sensibility. The songs written by Venus Mars Project have been known to reflect the signature positivity that is a staple throughout their work. The band is known for using music as a creative outlet and reflection of their personal lives, with much of their subject matter coming from shared experiences that can relate to everyone.

The band's songs so far share similar notions of being positive, showing determination, and having fun. One example is with the lyrics of their song, Not Gonna Stop Me Now (2015), which reflects the band's stated beliefs about not allowing outside factors get in the way of achieving one's goals and never backing down from challenges or adversity.

== Members ==
Current

- Jacyn Tremblay – lead vocals (2013–present)
- Peter Tentindo – lead guitar, vocals, (2013–present)

Backing band

- Derek Dupuis – keyboard, piano, synths, backing vocals (2015–present)
- Matt Girard – bass guitar (2015–present)
- KC Tentindo – rhythm guitar (2015–present)
- Jonathan Ulman – drums, percussion (2015–present)
- Sean Fitzgerald – drums, percussion (2015–present)

== Discography ==
=== Singles ===
- 2013: Hands of Time (produced by Kenny Lewis)
- 2014: Jump In (produced by Kenny Lewis)
- 2015: Not Gonna Stop Me Now (mixed by Bob St. John)
- 2015: #LaLaLaLove (produced by Anthony Resta)

== Music videos ==
Year	Song	Director
2014	Hands of Time	Ben Consoli
2014	Jump In	Ben Consoli
