= Bruce Bradley =

Bruce Bradley may refer to:

- Bruce Bradley (radio personality) (c.1933–2013), American radio personality
- Bruce Bradley (water polo) (born 1947), American water polo player
- Bruce Bradley, archaeologist who proposed the Solutrean hypothesis with Dennis Stanford
