= Don Kent (meteorologist) =

American meteorologist (1917–2010)

- Born: September 29, 1917; Dorchester, Massachusetts, US
- Died: March 2, 2010 (aged 92); Franklin, New Hampshire, US
- Occupation: Meteorologist

Donald Edward Kent (September 29, 1917 – March 2, 2010) was an American radio and television weather forecaster for several decades in the Boston, Massachusetts area. He was known as "Boston's first TV Weatherman."

== Early life ==
Kent was born in Dorchester, Massachusetts, and was raised in the Wollaston section of Quincy. He graduated from North Quincy High School and attended MIT.

== Career ==
Kent started doing weather forecasts on radio and TV in the Boston area in 1937. He developed and applied his weather forecasting skills while serving in the U.S. Coast Guard during World War II era, where he achieved the rank of chief petty officer. After the war and for many years, he appeared on WBZ (AM) radio and WBZ-TV.

After retiring from WBZ in 1983, Kent started a new career as the weather forecaster for Cape Cod radio station WQRC. He would compile reports from his home in Sanbornton, New Hampshire.

== Death ==
Don Kent died in the early morning hours of March 2, 2010, of natural causes at Franklin Regional Hospital in Franklin, New Hampshire, at age 92.

== Awards and honors ==
Kent is one of the first to be inducted to the Massachusetts Broadcasters Hall of Fame, along with Rex Trailer, Jess Cain, Frank Avruch (Bozo the Clown to Boston television audiences) and Bob Elliott and Ray Goulding (Bob and Ray).

== Bibliography ==
- "Great New England Storms of the Twentieth Century" (Contributor) Boston: The Boston Globe, 2007 ISBN 0-9790137-2-0
