= WEEI (AM) =

Radio station in Boston

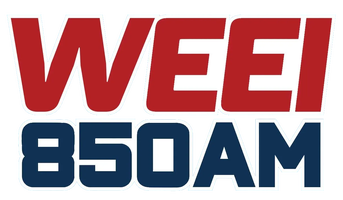
- Boston, Massachusetts; United States
- Broadcast area: Greater Boston
- Frequency: 850 kHz
- Branding: WEEI 850 AM

Programming
- Language: English
- Format: Sports gambling
- Affiliations: BetMGM Network; Westwood One Sports; Compass Media Networks; Boston College Eagles; Boston Red Sox

Ownership
- Owner: Audacy, Inc.; (Audacy License, LLC)
- Sister stations: WBGB; WEEI-FM; WMJX; WVEI; WBMX

History
- First air date: June 20, 1929 (as WHDH)
- Former call signs: WHDH (1929–1994)
- Former frequencies: 830 kHz (1929–1941)
- Call sign meaning: Callsign originally used on WEEI (590 AM), which was founded by Edison Electric Illuminating

Technical information
- Licensing authority: FCC
- Facility ID: 1912
- Class: B
- Power: 50,000 watts
- Transmitter coordinates: 42°16′41.4″N 71°16′0.2″W

Links
- Public license information: Public file; LMS
- Webcast: Listen live (via Audacy)

WEEI (850 kHz) is a commercial sports gambling AM radio station licensed to Boston, Massachusetts, serving Greater Boston and much of New England. Owned by Audacy, Inc., WEEI is the Boston affiliate for the Audacy-owned BetMGM Network and Westwood One Sports, serving as a gambling-focused brand extension of its main sports radio station in the market, WEEI-FM. The WEEI studios are located in Boston's Brighton neighborhood, while the station transmitter resides in the Boston suburb of Needham. In addition to a standard analog transmission, WEEI is available online via Audacy.

Historically, the station is perhaps best known by its former WHDH call letters, under which it operated from its establishment in 1929 until 1994; it then became the second home to WEEI following an intellectual property purchase. After WEEI's local programming moved to 93.7 FM in 2011, the station became a full-time ESPN Radio affiliate in 2012, and a sports gambling-focused station in 2021.

== History ==
=== WHDH (850 AM) ===
==== Early years ====
Originally located in Gloucester, Massachusetts, WHDH was founded on June 20, 1929, by Ralph Matheson. It was a daytime-only station broadcasting at 830 kHz (leaving the air at local sunset in Denver, about two hours after sunset in Boston, to protect the signal of KOA in the Colorado capital city). WHDH was Matheson's second station; he had started WEPS on November 26, 1926. Much of WEPS' programming consisted of broadcasts to, for, or about fisherman, given Gloucester's status as a major port for the fishing industry. The WHDH license was issued in December 1928, a month after WEPS was forced to share time with WKBE in Webster on 1200 kHz; WEPS was sold to Alfred Kleindienst, owner of its share-time partner (which became WORC in Auburn, near Worcester, a year earlier), in February 1930, with WEPS being moved to Auburn and consolidated with WORC on May 5. Matheson kept WHDH, which moved its studios to Boston on November 6, 1930, though some programming had originated from Boston for some time beforehand, and the transmitter remained in Gloucester until a 1932 move to Saugus. With the move, WHDH broadened its programming, but still included some reports for fishermen. In subsequent decades, WHDH would claim WEPS' history as its own.

The 1941 North American Regional Broadcasting Agreement moved WHDH to 850 kHz, and allowed the station to broadcast on a full-time basis. WHDH was able to increase power to 5,000 watts and go full-time, but not without protests from KOA, one of the dominant class A clear channel stations on 850 AM. For two years, from 1943 until 1945, WHDH was the local affiliate of the Blue Network, the former "NBC Blue", replacing WBZ as Blue affiliate; WHDH ceded the affiliation to WCOP after the Blue Network also chose to affiliate with Lawrence's WLAW (the facilities of which were subsequently sold to WNAC).

==== Purchase by the Herald-Traveler ====
In 1946, shortly after World War II, the Boston Herald-Traveler newspaper purchased WHDH, by this time again an independent station. In 1948, the station moved its transmitter site from Saugus to Needham, west of Boston, where the station would be able to increase power to 50,000 watts with a directional signal aimed east to protect KOA and other stations on 850. The station also expanded into FM broadcasting on March 31, 1948, with the sign-on of WHDH-FM (94.5 FM, now WJMN).

While not first in Boston to adopt a popular music and disc jockey format with hourly newscasts (WORL was the first), a combination of a powerful signal, top-notch personalities like Ray Dorey, Fred B. Cole, Bob Clayton, Norm Nathan, news anchor John Day, and a mid-morning women's show hosted by Christine Evans (also billing herself as Chris); along with live coverage of Boston Red Sox baseball, Boston Bruins hockey, and Boston Celtics basketball, made WHDH one of the most popular stations in the region in the post-World War II era. In the late 1950s, Jess Cain joined the station, first co-hosting the morning show with Dorey, then as solo host when Dorey moved over to television. Cain would remain at WHDH for 34 years. By the early 1960s, Hank Forbes and Alan Dary had joined Cain, Clayton, and Nathan on the WHDH staff.

In the 1950s and 1960s, WHDH, along with WBZ, had among the strongest lineup of personality disc jockeys in Boston radio history. While the two stations for the most part programmed different kinds of music, both had very talented air personalities who were "household names" in the Boston area.

Perhaps the station's best-known on-air personalities outside of Boston were the comedy team of Bob and Ray, who did a comedy-and-records show at WHDH before they departed for national fame in New York City. The station employed a popular MOR (what today would be called "adult standards") music format, which would also include soft rock songs by the end of the 1960s. The station also had specialty shows playing jazz and big band music.

==== Sports coverage ====
While WHDH was never "all sports", it was easily Boston's top sports station during the 1950s through the end of the 1960s. It referred to itself "The Voice of Sports", a sub-branding of the station's overall imaging as "The Sound of the City". For 30 consecutive years, from 1946 to 1975, WHDH was the flagship station of the Boston Red Sox, featuring play-by-play announcers such as Jim Britt, Ford C. Frick Award-winning Curt Gowdy, Ken Coleman, and Ned Martin. From 1946 to 1949, it also broadcast the Boston Braves, the city's National League baseball club (the Red Sox and Braves then only broadcast home games, thus the teams shared the same announcers and did not have schedule conflicts). After the Braves left WHDH for WNAC (the forerunner to WBIX and WRKO) in 1950, WHDH began broadcasting all Red Sox games, home and away.

The station also aired one of the first sports-oriented talk programs, although without telephone calls. "The Voice of Sports" was a Saturday night feature for years, usually hosted by Don Gillis and featuring sports reporters from the Herald-Traveler. It was a panel discussion program featuring lively debate about sports for an hour and represented the sum total of sports talk on Boston radio in that era. The title was also used for a sports talk program when telephone sports talk began to take hold in the early 1970s. It was an afternoon telephone sports talk hosted by Leo Egan which ended after the station was sold to John Blair Broadcasting.

During the winter months, WHDH and WHDH-FM were the flagship stations of the Boston Celtics of the National Basketball Association and the Boston Bruins of the National Hockey League, employing such announcers as Johnny Most, Fred Cusick, and Bob Wilson. For a single season, Jim Laing was the announcer for Bruins games and brought candor to the job. He was fired for being too frank about a team that finished sixth in a six-team league. In the mid- and late 1960s, when both the Bruins and Celtics played, one of the teams (usually the one playing at home) was heard on AM; while the other (usually the team playing on the road) was heard on FM. WHDH also was the radio home of Harvard University football in the autumn, including 1968, the year of Harvard's famous 29-29 "win" against arch-rival Yale, considered one of the greatest college-football games ever played.

In addition, the original WHDH-TV (channel 5), which took to the air November 26, 1957, was the flagship station of the Red Sox television network from 1958 to 1971.

==== Impact from loss of television license ====
WHDH began to lose its valuable properties in 1969, when the Bruins and Celtics were wooed away by WBZ. Soon afterward, the Boston Herald-Traveler Corporation's license to operate channel 5 was revoked by the Federal Communications Commission, and was given to one of the groups of businessmen that challenged its license (Boston Broadcasters, Incorporated); on March 19, 1972, channel 5 became WCVB-TV. Stung by the loss of its highly profitable television station, the Herald-Traveler was put on the market, and acquired by the Hearst Corporation in June 1972; the Boston Herald-Traveler Corporation, left with just the radio stations, then changed its name to WHDH Corporation. Less than two years later, WHDH and its FM sister station (by this time called WCOZ) were sold to Blair Radio, a national radio station advertising representative; the deal marked Blair's entry into station ownership. WHDH then elected to not renew its contract with the Red Sox upon its expiration following the 1975 season, citing financial losses; the broadcasts moved to WMEX starting with the 1975 postseason. WHDH did not carry Sox games again until 1983, when it became an affiliate of the Campbell Sports Network, based out of WPLM and WPLM-FM in Plymouth; Campbell moved the broadcasts to WRKO following the 1985 season. The station's last major sports property was the New England Patriots during the late 1980s.

Blair modernized the WHDH format, bringing it from the adult standards-oriented MOR sound to more of an adult contemporary approach. Veteran disk jockeys were replaced by personalities with a top 40 background, such as former WRKO personality Tom Kennedy (the DJ, not the game-show host), Bob Raleigh from WPGC in Washington (owned by Richmond Bros., owners of WMEX), Sean Casey, who was formerly with WOR-FM in New York and Bill Silver, the well-known voice of per inquiry advertisements who put the phrase "but wait there's more" into the national lexicon. The music was carefully researched and became more contemporary to appeal to an adult demographic but without a rock and roll style presentation; for all intents and purposes, WHDH played top 40 without any hard rock and with more non-current material. By the early 1980s, WHDH began to focus even less on music and more on personality, while playing more music and having less talk than rival WBZ. Air talent then consisted of people such as Dave Supple, Tom Kennedy, Jim Sands (who did a popular Saturday-night oldies show), and Tom Doyle (who by the early 1980s was Cain's co-host).

By the mid-1980s, WHDH was moving toward more of a talk format and on August 22, 1988, the station dropped music abruptly; although the station had been playing more music than WBZ, that station would gradually phase out music over the next several years. During its talk radio days, programs hosted by Larry Glick (who moved from WBZ in 1987), Avi Nelson, David Brudnoy (who would later go to WRKO, and finally, to WBZ), among others, were featured. During this time, Blair, following a takeover by Reliance Capital Group, chose to sell its English-language broadcast stations to focus on the Spanish-language Telemundo television network; in March 1987, it reached a deal to sell its entire radio group to Sconnix Broadcasting. The deal separated WHDH from its longtime FM sister station (which had become WZOU), as Sconnix chose to spin off WZOU and retain its existing FM station in the Boston market, WBOS. In 1988, WHDH became an affiliate of the NBC Radio Network.

==== David Mugar era ====
On August 7, 1989, WHDH was sold to local businessman David G. Mugar, whose New England Television Corporation (NETV) owned CBS affiliate WNEV-TV (channel 7). (Sconnix sold WBOS a year earlier.) On March 12, 1990, WNEV's call letters became WHDH-TV to correspond with WHDH radio. Mugar was hoping to bring back a main competitor to WBZ radio and television, with a renewed emphasis on news and straight talk format with some political programming. Some sports programs remained, but news and talk were main priorities. Among the personalities to arrive in the early 1990s were mostly talents from within NETV, including television newscaster Ted O'Brien. WHDH also became the Boston affiliate for The Rush Limbaugh Show. The station also moved into channel 7's studios at Bulfinch Place (near Government Center) in downtown Boston. However, by 1992, NETV was in trouble due to increasing debt incurred by the channel 7 acquisition as well as declining advertising revenues, leading to speculation of a sale of WHDH radio; on December 1, the station was sold to Atlantic Radio, putting it under the same ownership as rival talk station WRKO. (Mugar would sell WHDH-TV to Sunbeam Television in 1993.)

Atlantic Radio made an attempt to distinguish WHDH and WRKO in 1993 by relaunching WHDH as an "information station", with the feature-oriented Boston This Morning premiering in the morning drive slot on March 8; nine months later, on December 16, it was replaced with News All Morning, a news block competing against WBZ. Conversely, the station began to air a talk show hosted by Boston Herald columnist and one-time WRKO midday host Howie Carr on October 4, 1993, airing in afternoon drive against WRKO's Jerry Williams. During this time, Atlantic transferred hourly CBS Radio Network newscasts from WRKO to WHDH; additionally, Atlantic merged with two other radio groups, Stoner Broadcasting Systems and Multi Market Communications, on November 1 to form American Radio Systems (ARS).

On August 15, 1994, American Radio Systems announced the purchase of WEEI (590 AM)'s intellectual property (call letters, programming, and staff) from Back Bay Broadcasters, who had acquired WEEI from the Boston Celtics back in March. ARS then announced plans to move WEEI to the stronger 850 AM, replacing WHDH. ARS concurrently moved the Rush Limbaugh and Howie Carr shows, in addition to the "Skyway Patrol" traffic report brand, from WHDH to WRKO. The Money Experts, a daily financial talk show also previously heard on WHDH, would move to WBNW, a new business talk station that would take over WEEI's old frequency. WHDH's final broadcast, on August 28, 1994, concluded at midnight with "Taps" and the sound of a flushing toilet; these were played by a disgruntled board operator who was laid off in the transition, and subsequently led to a formal apology from ARS.

=== WEEI (850 AM) ===
==== SportsRadio 850 ====
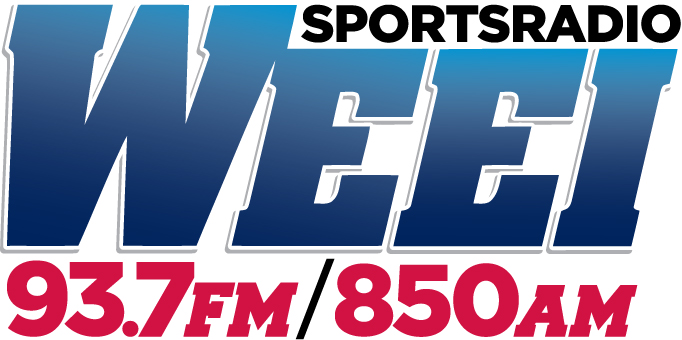
Logo of the radio station under the Sportsradio branding; this version was used during its simulcast with WEEI-FM.

As part of this complex transaction, ARS changed the station's format to sports radio on August 29, 1994, rebranded the station "SportsRadio 850 WEEI", and reassigned on- and off-air personnel; the WHDH call sign was officially changed to WEEI on August 31. In effect, this new WEEI (850 AM) became the successor to the previous WEEI (590 AM), which had changed its call sign to WBNW on August 25, 1994.

WEEI simulcast with WBNW for a week before WBNW debuted its business news format. With the move to 850, WEEI retained Boston Celtics broadcasts, which ARS had acquired the rights to earlier in the year, and also inherited WHDH's rights to Boston College Eagles men's basketball; WEEI's existing rights to BC football were also carried over to 850 AM. Due to conflicts with BC basketball, Boston Bruins broadcasts, which WEEI had carried on 590 AM, remained on that frequency even after the launch of WBNW; the team had already announced its move to WBZ effective with the 1995–96 season. The new WEEI also continued WHDH's CBS Radio Network affiliation until early 1995, when it moved to WBZ. The move to the 850 frequency allowed WEEI to broadcast at 50,000 watts, as opposed to 5,000 watts on 590. ARS also moved Red Sox broadcasts to WEEI from WRKO starting in 1995, marking their return to the 850 kHz frequency. Conversely, Celtics broadcasts were moved to WRKO for the 1995–96 season; they returned to WEEI the following season.

Concurrent with the move to 850, WEEI ceased an affiliation with ESPN Radio; however, on September 11, 1995, it returned to the network to carry The Fabulous Sports Babe (in middays) in a schedule shuffle that also saw the merger of the Dale Arnold and Eddie Andelman shows into The A-Team and the launch of The Big Show. WEEI also added "Patriots Monday", featuring weekly appearances from New England Patriots players and coaches, in 1995; it moved to rival WNRB (the former WMEX) in 1999, but returned to WEEI in 2002, and was joined by the similar "Patriots Friday" (formerly aired on WAMG) in 2008. In March 1995, the station ceased carrying Sports Byline USA and One-on-One Sports in the overnight hours in favor of the Sports Fan Radio Network. The Fabulous Sports Babe left the WEEI lineup on October 3, 1997, with the station using its time slot to launch the locally-produced Dennis and Callahan on October 6. Dennis and Callahan became the station's morning show on September 7, 1999, after the station dropped Imus in the Morning in August due to declining ratings.

Westinghouse Electric Corporation, then-parent company of CBS Radio, announced its acquisition of American Radio Systems in September 1997. As the combined company would have controlled 59 percent of advertising revenues in the Boston market, as well as three of the top five radio stations, in April 1998 the Department of Justice ordered CBS to divest WEEI, WRKO, WAAF (now WKVB), and WEGQ (now WEEI-FM), as well as KSD and KLOU in St. Louis and WOCT in Baltimore, as a condition of its approval of the merger. In August 1998, Entercom announced plans to acquire the four Boston-area stations, along with WWTM (now WVEI), from CBS for $140 million.

WEEI again lost the Celtics broadcast rights in 2001, this time to WWZN (the former WNRB). Entercom reacquired the rights to the broadcasts in 2005; initially heard on WRKO, Celtics games moved back to WEEI in 2007 (though Celtics coaches and players appeared on WEEI regularly during WRKO's time as flagship). In April 2005, WEEI began streaming its broadcasts live online by way of a free membership at its official website; a previous stream was offered from 1997 until 2002. The exception is for Red Sox and Celtics games, as these are streamed only through the team and league websites as part of subscription packages. Around the same time, the station again lost ESPN Radio programming when the affiliation was acquired by WAMG and WLLH; the station then expanded an affiliation with Fox Sports Radio that began in 2002.

WEEI was awarded its first Marconi Award in September 2006 for sports station of the year. WEEI was also named large market station of the year.

The station had an ongoing feud with The Boston Globe. In 1999, the Globe's executive sports editor, Don Skwar, banned the newspaper's sports writers from appearing on the station's afternoon The Big Show after columnist Ron Borges used a racial slur while on the air in reference to New York Yankees pitcher Hideki Irabu. Two weeks later, the ban was extended to WEEI's Dennis and Callahan morning show. WEEI retaliated by banning Globe staffers from all its shows. Nevertheless, WEEI host Michael Holley is a former Globe columnist. The ban came to an end on August 4, 2009, when Bob Ryan appeared on The Big Show, with host Glenn Ordway stating that "we have all come to our senses".

==== ESPN on WEEI ====
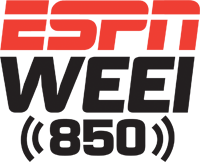
Logo as "ESPN on WEEI"

In September 2009, The Boston Globe reported that ESPN Radio was in negotiations to clear some of its night and weekend programming on WEEI, with speculation suggesting that WEEI could subsequently move to one of Entercom's properties on the FM dial (such as the 93.7 FM facility then occupied by WMKK), with the AM 850 signal switching to ESPN Radio. The report followed WAMG's decision to end its ESPN Radio affiliation and go silent, along with the launch of an FM competitor, WBZ-FM, the previous month—the first serious threat to WEEI's dominance in Boston sports radio. Entercom confirmed on October 7, 2009, that ESPN Radio programming would return to WEEI effective November 2 (though most programming would remain local). WEEI began to carry ESPN Radio's overnight programming, including AllNight with Jason Smith, and some weekend programming. As late as December 2010, station management continued to deny occasional reports of a move of WEEI's programming to WMKK. Ultimately, WEEI began to simulcast on 93.7 FM on September 12, 2011, a decision that came after WBZ-FM began outrating WEEI in three key demographics, even when its ratings were combined with those of Boston-area listeners of its simulcast on 103.7 FM in Providence, Rhode Island.

On September 18, 2012, Entercom and announced that AM 850 would become "ESPN on WEEI", a full-time affiliate of ESPN Radio. The simulcast of WEEI and WEEI-FM was split on October 4, 2012; the existing local programming and sports broadcasts remained on WEEI-FM, while AM 850 aired a redirection loop for one day before joining ESPN Radio on October 5. ESPN Radio's morning show, Mike and Mike, marked its new affiliate with a live broadcast from Gillette Stadium. While the bulk of the station's programming after the change came from the national ESPN Radio schedule, WEEI indicated that it might also air some locally produced weekend long-form specialty programs that do not necessarily fit on WEEI-FM. WEEI also aired Boston Celtics games that conflicted with Boston Red Sox games on WEEI-FM through the 2012–2013 season; if the conflict involved a Celtics playoff game, the Celtics aired on WEEI-FM and the Red Sox game was on WEEI.

==== Sports betting ====
In October 2021, WEEI dropped ESPN Radio in favor of sports betting programming from the Audacy-owned BetQL Network. The station also carried some programming from CBS Sports Radio. Unlike the other Audacy stations with a sports betting format, which brand as "The Bet", WEEI continues to brand using its call sign.
