= Dave Maynard =

American television host and radio personality

- Born: David H. Maynard; May 6, 1929; Larchmont, New York, U.S.
- Died: February 12, 2012 (aged 82); Hernando, Florida, U.S.
- Occupations: Television host, radio personality
- Years active: 1952-1991
- Spouse: Patricia Early (m. 1988)
- Children: 3 sons, 3 daughters

David H. Maynard was a Boston television host and radio personality.

Maynard was born in Larchmont, New York, in 1929. He obtained his Bachelor of Arts degree from Emerson College and his Master of Communication from Boston University, where he taught for 17 years.

== Broadcasting career ==
Maynard's first job in radio was at WXKS (AM) in 1952. He later started at WORL, working as a rock DJ at both stations. In 1965, he took over from Gene Burns as the host of "Community Auditions," the amateur talent showcase that first began airing on WBZ-TV in 1950, and ended after 36 years on June 18, 1986.

He did nighttime talk radio at WBZ (AM) for a year before being offered the morning position at WBZ radio in 1980. Maynard in the Morning became the number one rated morning radio show in Boston. He was well known for his catchphrase "piece of cake" in commercials promoting this show. He also appeared as a cooking expert on a number of regional TV shows, and published three cookbooks, including The Dave Maynard Tried and True Secret Family Recipe Late Night Cook Book, a compilation of listener recipes, and Dave Maynard's Soups, Stews and Casseroles.

December 1, 1983, was proclaimed "Dave Maynard Day" by mayor Kevin White of Boston to honor Maynard's 25 years of broadcasting at WBZ. Maynard announced his retirement in June 1991. He was inducted in the Massachusetts Broadcasters Hall of Fame in 2009.

== Death ==
Maynard died on February 9, 2012, after a decade long fight with Parkinson's disease.
