= Jennifer Brien =

Radio talk show host

Jennifer Brien is a talk radio host based in Providence, Rhode Island. She was born and raised in Woonsocket, Rhode Island and served six years in the Army Military Police (MP) K-9 Unit.

== Career ==
Brien formerly hosted her own show on weekdays from 1:00-3:00 p.m. on WRKO in Boston, Massachusetts. She was replaced by Michele McPhee, who returned to WRKO on June 11, 2012.

Brien was named as the "permanent replacement" for the retired Steve Leveille on weekends from midnight-5:00 a.m. on WBZ in Boston. The Jen Brien Show began on June 25, 2013, and lasted for three months. On October 2, 2013, it was announced that the show would no longer air on WBZ. Fill-in host Morgan White Jr. read a statement from WBZ program director Peter Casey saying that the station had re-evaluated its programming, and to better serve its overnight listeners, Brien would no longer air. Casey wrote that White Jr. would be temporarily replacing Brien for the rest of the week and more information about the overnight show would be announced later.

Brien formerly co-hosted a weekday morning talk show on WHJJ in Providence with Ron St. Pierre. She has also hosted shows on WCOD-FM and WXTK in Cape Cod, Massachusetts, and WHAM of Rochester, New York.

In 2021, Jen launched a podcast with Rhode Island Radio Hall Of Famer Ron St. Pierre, called "Ron and Jen's Great Escape".
