= WBZ (AM) =

American radio station in Boston

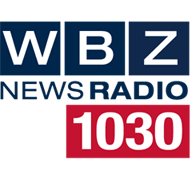
- Boston, Massachusetts (Note: Originally licensed to Springfield, Massachusetts; moved to Boston in 1931.); United States
- Broadcast area: Greater Boston
- Frequency: 1030 kHz
- Branding: WBZ Boston's Newsradio

Programming
- Language: English
- Format: News/talk
- Affiliations: ABC News Radio; Associated Press; Bloomberg Radio; NBC News Radio

Ownership
- Owner: iHeartMedia; (iHM Licenses, LLC)
- Sister stations: WBWL; WJMN; WRKO; WXKS; WXKS-FM; WZLX; WZRM

History
- First air date: September 19, 1921
- Former frequencies: 833 kHz (1921–1922); 750 kHz (1922–1923); 710 kHz (1923); 790 kHz (1923); 890 kHz (1923–1925); 900 kHz (1925–1928); 990 kHz (1928–1941)
- Call sign meaning: Randomly assigned by the Department of Commerce; previously assigned to a cargo ship which burned the previous year

Technical information
- Licensing authority: FCC
- Facility ID: 25444
- Class: A
- Power: 50,000 watts unlimited
- Transmitter coordinates: 42°16′44.36″N 70°52′32.16″W
- Repeater: 107.9 WXKS-FM HD2 (Medford)

Links
- Public license information: Public file; LMS
- Webcast: Listen live (via iHeartRadio)
- Website: wbznewsradio.iheart.com

WBZ (1030 kHz) is a commercial AM radio station, licensed to Boston, Massachusetts, and owned and operated by iHeartMedia. Its studios and offices are located on Cabot Road in the Boston suburb of Medford.

WBZ's format features all-news programming most of the day and overnight, and talk radio programming in the evening. The station's programming is also carried on the second HD Radio channel of co-owned WXKS-FM. WBZ is the designated Primary Entry Point (PEP) for the Emergency Alert System (EAS) in Massachusetts and New Hampshire.

WBZ is a clear-channel station (officially classified as Class A), with a transmitter power output of 50,000 watts, and employing a directional antenna that sends a majority of its signal westward. Its two-tower array and transmitter site are in Hull, Massachusetts. WBZ can be heard during daylight hours throughout much of New England. Its nighttime signal covers at least 38 American states and much of Eastern Canada.

WBZ was granted its first license by the United States Department of Commerce on September 15, 1921, and was originally located in Springfield, Massachusetts, before moving to Boston in 1931. It is the oldest broadcasting station in New England, and one of the oldest in the United States. It was founded, and owned for most of its existence, by Westinghouse Broadcasting and its successor CBS Radio.

== Programming ==
WBZ has long been one of the highest-rated stations in the Boston area. It is an affiliate of ABC News Radio, NBC News Radio, and AP Radio for national and international news as well as some features. The bulk of the station's schedule, except some weekend programming, is produced in-house. WBZ is heavily involved in charitable work, including its annual Christmastime fund drive for the Boston Children's Hospital, which it does along with TV station WBZ-TV.

WBZ runs an all-news format during the day and overnight. In the evening, it airs talk programming. Radio personality Dan Rea hosts an interview and call-in show on weeknights, with other hosts on weekend evenings. The station had been the home of talk host David Brudnoy for 18 years, until the day before his death in 2004. Other past personalities included talk show host Bob Kennedy, poet/radio host Dick Summer, and disc jockeys Bruce Bradley, Jeff Kaye, and Ron Landry. WBZ also featured shows from Larry Justice, jazz DJ-turned-talkmaster Norm Nathan, late-night talker and humorist Larry Glick, and morning hosts Carl DeSuze, Tom Bergeron, and Dave Maynard. For decades, WBZ was the radio home of Boston meteorologist Don Kent.

== History ==
In November 1920, the Westinghouse Electric & Manufacturing Company established its first broadcasting station, KDKA, located in its plant in East Pittsburgh, Pennsylvania. The station was set up to promote the sale of Westinghouse radio receivers. This initial station proved successful, so in 1921 the company expanded its activities by building three additional stations, beginning with WBZ, and followed by WJZ in Newark, New Jersey (now WABC in New York City), and KYW, originally in Chicago, and now in Philadelphia.

=== 1921–1931: Springfield ===
Westinghouse's application included the request "Please assign call letters KDKS if possible". However, the requested call sign was assigned to a ship named Salvor, so the station's first license, issued September 15, 1921, was randomly assigned the call letters WBZ. WBZ initially transmitted on a wavelength of 375 meters (800 kHz), before moving to 360 meters (833 kHz) with a power of 100 watts. It was located at the company's East Springfield facility on Page Boulevard. WBZ's inaugural program on September 19 was a remote broadcast originating from the Eastern States Exposition in West Springfield.

When WBZ began operations, there were no specific government standards for what constituted a broadcasting station. A small number of stations were already providing regularly scheduled entertainment broadcasts, most of which operated under Amateur or Experimental licenses. (A prime example was the American Radio & Research Corporation's experimental station, 1XE in Medford Hillside, Massachusetts, near Boston, which was relicensed in early 1922 as WGI.) Effective December 1, 1921, the U.S. government formally established regulations to define a broadcasting station, by setting aside two wavelengths—360 meters for entertainment, and 485 meters (619 kHz) for official weather and other government reports—and requiring the stations to hold a Limited Commercial license.

WBZ was one of a handful of stations which already met the new standard, and its initial license was the first Limited Commercial license that had specified broadcasting on the 360-meter wavelength that would be formally designated by the December 1 regulations. By some interpretations, this made WBZ America's first broadcasting station, and in 1923 the Department of Commerce, referring to WBZ, stated that "The first broadcasting license was issued in September, 1921". However, WBZ's priority is not widely recognized, when compared to other stations with earlier heritages, in particular KDKA, WWJ in Detroit, and KQW in San Jose, California (now KCBS in San Francisco).

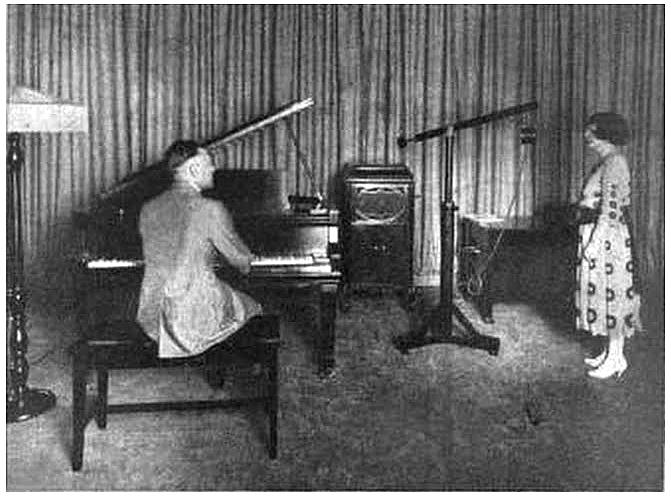
Maude Gray, Prima Donna of the Aborn Musical Comedy Co., performing at WBZ (1922)

By early 1922, WBZ's studios were set up at the luxurious Hotel Kimball in Metro Center Springfield. Programs consisted of general entertainment and information, including live music (often classical and opera), sports, farm reports, special events, and public affairs programming. Despite being housed in Springfield's top hotel, the station's location in a mid-sized city rendered it somewhat difficult to attract top-flight artists. That prompted Westinghouse to open a remote studio on February 24, 1924, at the Hotel Brunswick in Boston. Because of its wide reach, the station often referred to itself as "WBZ New England", as opposed to associating itself solely with Springfield or Boston.

Following the opening of the Boston studio, WBZ expanded its news programming via a partnership with the Boston Herald and Traveler newspapers, and carried pro and college sports broadcasts, including Boston Bruins hockey, Boston Braves baseball, and Harvard Crimson football. WBZ's Bruins broadcasts, which began in early December 1924, made it the first Boston station to broadcast a professional hockey game; the first play-by-play announcer for the hockey broadcasts was local sportswriter Frank Ryan. Its broadcast of the Boston Braves' home opener on April 14, 1925, made WBZ the first Boston station to broadcast a local major league baseball game; the announcer was comedian (and baseball fan) Joe E. Brown.

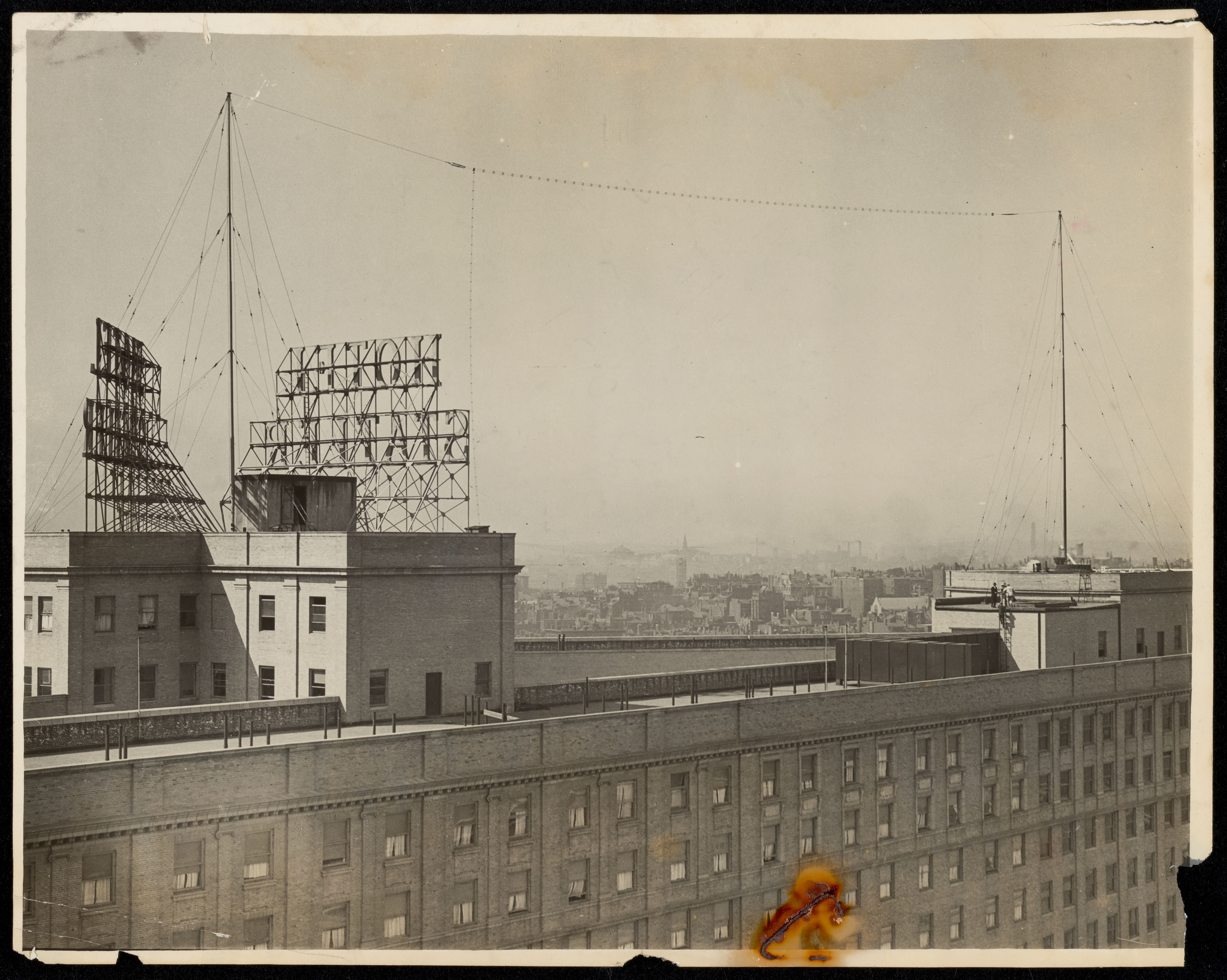
WBZA towers on roof of the Hotel Statler, Boston, in 1927

WBZ increased its transmitter power to 2,000 watts by April 1925. But the station still had difficulty reaching Boston listeners. This led Westinghouse to inaugurate, on August 20, 1925, a 250-watt relay station, WBZA, located in Boston and transmitting on 1240 kHz. Efforts were soon made to change WBZA to a synchronous repeater, transmitting on the same frequency as WBZ, 900 kHz, but the process proved difficult, as the two transmitters often interfered with each other, even in Boston. For nearly a year, while the technology was being perfected, WBZA shifted between the two transmitting frequencies, before finally going to full-time synchronous operation in June 1926.

The power of the WBZ transmitter in East Springfield continued to be boosted. On March 31, 1926, it was granted permission to operate with 5,000 watts. By 1927, it was operating with 15,000 watts. Meanwhile, a combination of WBZ's growth and continued difficulties with the WBZA signal led the station to move its Boston studio to the Statler Hotel (now the Boston Park Plaza) on June 1, 1927, and activate a new WBZA transmitter on June 9. On November 11, 1928, under the provisions of the Federal Radio Commission's (FRC) General Order 40, WBZ and WBZA were assigned exclusive national use of a "clear channel" frequency, 990 kHz.

Amidst the technical changes, WBZ began sharing its programs by network with other radio stations. By 1925, it often shared programs with WJZ in New York City (which was transferred from Westinghouse to the Radio Corporation of America in May 1923), and a WBZ program commemorating the 150th anniversary of Paul Revere's "Midnight Ride" was also fed to WRC in Washington, D.C., and WGY in Schenectady, New York. This paved the way for the station to become a charter affiliate of the National Broadcasting Company (NBC) on November 15, 1926, carrying the WJZ-originated NBC Blue Network beginning on January 1, 1927. With this change the station began running commercials for the first time. Previously Westinghouse had financed its stations through the profits from radio receiver sales. During this time, the station became known for having its own troupe of actors and actresses who produced and performed live radio plays: the "WBZ Players" made their radio debut in the spring of 1928, and continued into the 1930s.

=== 1931–1956: NBC affiliation ===
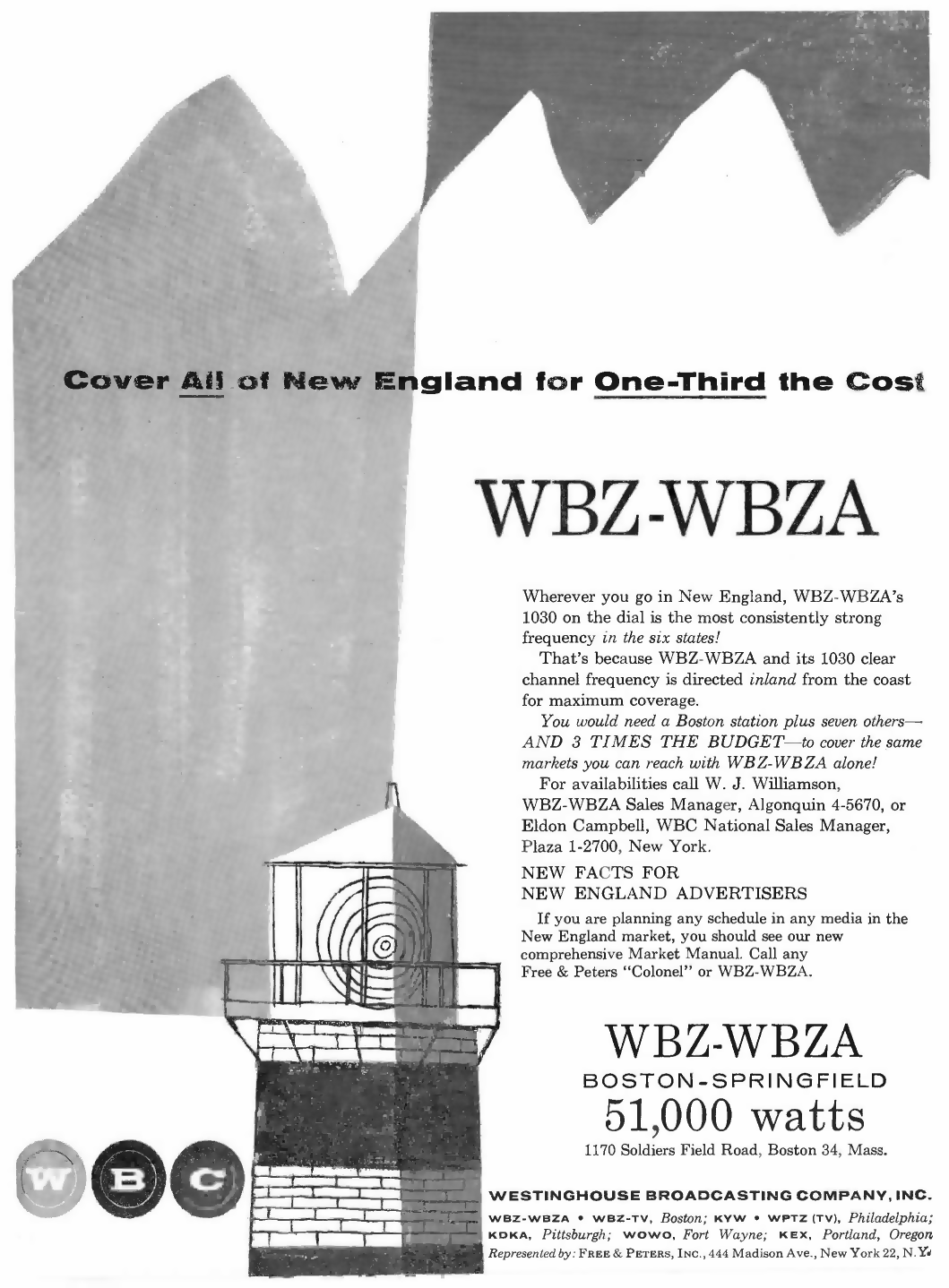
Until 1962, 1,000 watt WBZA in Springfield, Massachusetts, also on 1030 kHz, relayed WBZ's 50,000 watt signal

By 1931, Westinghouse had concluded that WBZ's primary market was Boston, so on February 21 the station began using a new transmitter site located at Millis, Massachusetts. The site was chosen to provide service not only to Boston but also to Worcester and Providence, Rhode Island. At the same time WBZA was transferred from Boston to using the East Springfield transmitter, which now operated with 1,000 watts and relayed WBZ's programming to an area that was inadequately served by the Millis transmitter.

The Boston studios (which now served as WBZ's main studios) moved as well, relocating on July 1, 1931, to the Hotel Bradford. (Some programs continued to originate from the WBZA Springfield studios at the Hotel Kimball.) WBZ offered its first Boston Marathon coverage on April 19, 1931. The following year, Westinghouse leased WBZ and WBZA to NBC, while maintaining ownership of the broadcast licenses. During the late 1930s, WBZ began to offer more local news coverage. Previously, only major events were regularly covered.

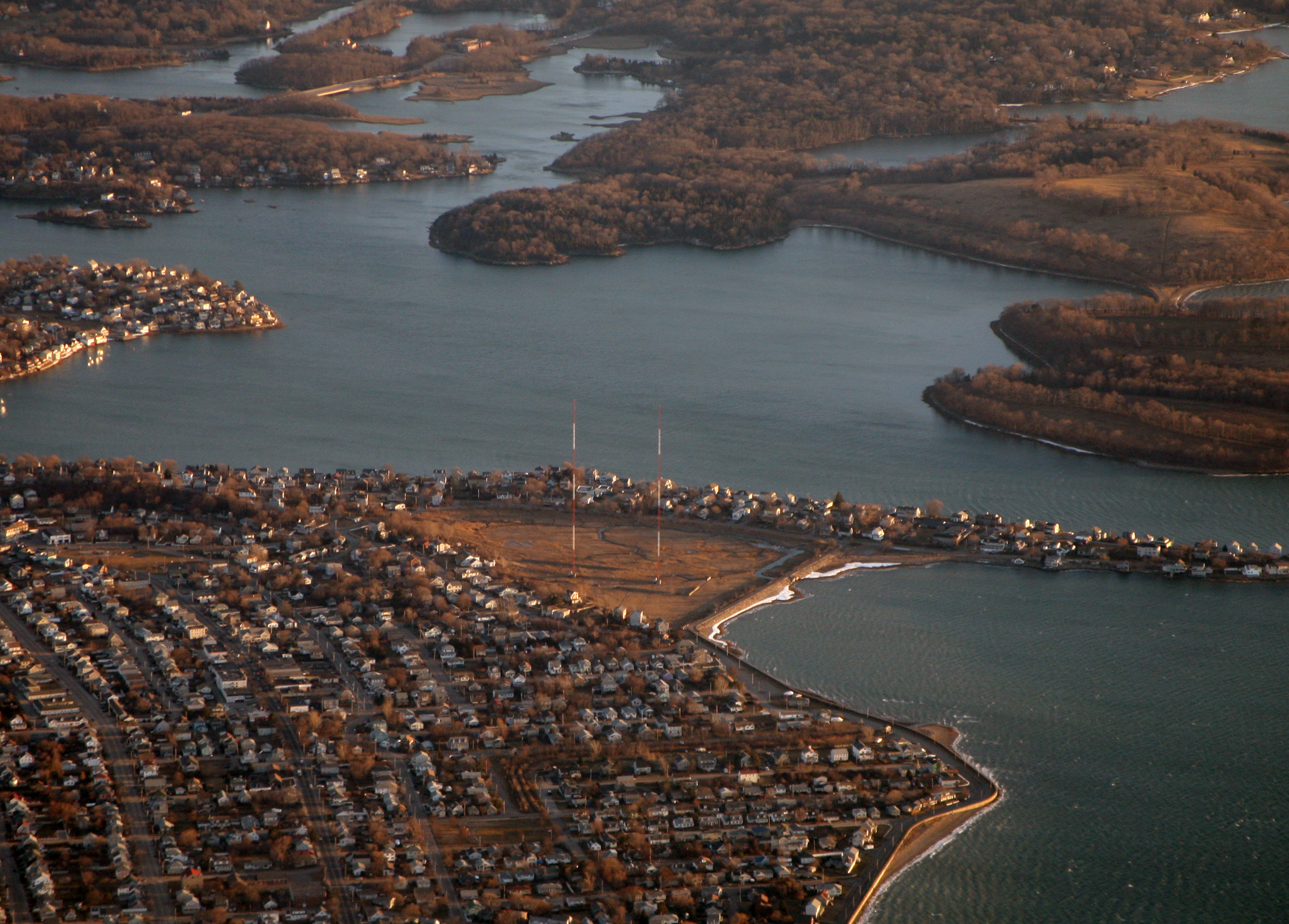
Aerial view of the Hull transmitter site

NBC's management of WBZ and WBZA ended on July 1, 1940, and Westinghouse resumed full control over the stations. Shortly afterward, on July 27, WBZ relocated its transmitter site once more, to its current location in Hull. A directional antenna array was constructed, consisting of two 520-foot- (160-meter) tall towers. The move was twofold: the Millis site, 25 miles (40 kilometers) southwest of Boston, had not provided as strong a signal to the market as was intended, even after power increases to 25,000 watts in 1931 and 50,000 watts in 1933. A key disadvantage of the Millis site was that the signal had to travel over land to Boston. In contrast the Hull site featured a highly conductive salt water path to the city.

The Hull site also provided ample space for WBZ's shortwave station, which had been founded at Springfield as W1XAZ in November 1929. It later operated from Millis as W1XK, ultimately becoming WBOS. WPIT, the shortwave station operated by KDKA in Pittsburgh, moved its transmitters to Hull at this time, and in 1941 its operations were folded into WBOS. The shortwave transmitters soon began carrying government-provided programming (a service that ultimately evolved into the Voice of America) that would remain the shortwave station's primary function until leaving the air permanently in 1953. The Hull site would also serve as the home for WBZ's first FM sister station, which operated from there as W1XK, W67B, and then WBZ-FM on several frequencies off and on from November 7, 1940, until November 21, 1948.

Under the provisions of the North American Regional Broadcasting Agreement, on March 29, 1941, WBZ's "clear channel" assignment was shifted to its present frequency, 1030 kHz. WBZ transferred from the Blue Network to the NBC Red Network on June 15, 1942. This allowed the station to retain a link with NBC after the Justice Department ordered NBC to divest one of its two radio networks. (It opted to sell the Blue Network, which became ABC, the American Broadcasting Company.) Like other major-market network-affiliated radio stations of the time, WBZ broadcast a few hours of local programming, including Vaudeville-like musical performances from Max Zides, Tom Currier, and others, during those hours when NBC was not feeding programs to affiliates.

The station expanded into television on June 9, 1948, when WBZ-TV (channel 4) first signed on as an NBC television affiliate. Westinghouse built new studios at 1170 Soldiers Field Road in the Allston section of Boston to house both the radio and television stations, with the new facility opening on June 17 of that year. (Parts of the new facility containing the master control and TV transmitter had already been in use). The transmission tower built at the studios for WBZ-TV would replace the Hull site as WBZ-FM's transmitter. It remained there until Hurricane Carol destroyed the tower on August 31, 1954. A power outage caused by the storm disrupted WBZ's programming for three minutes. Don Kent started as a meteorologist at the station in 1951, for a tenure that would endure for over three decades. The following year, WBZ expanded its broadcasting schedule to 24-hour-a-day programming.

=== 1956–1985: becoming a full-service powerhouse ===
During the 1950s, entertainment shows began moving to television, with the amount of music programming on radio increasing as a result. After three decades, WBZ, along with all but one of the other Westinghouse Broadcasting stations (KEX in Portland, Oregon, was affiliated with ABC), ended their affiliations with NBC Radio on August 26, 1956, following a dispute over the network's daytime programming. That prompted the station to program middle of the road music around the clock. The best known host in WBZ's history, Dave Maynard, joined the station in 1958. Another beloved WBZ host was Carl DeSuze, who joined WBZ in April 1942. He remained at the station until 1985. DeSuze was the station's morning man for over three decades. Another popular WBZ voice was longtime news anchor Gary LaPierre, who began at the station in September 1964.

At the outset, WBZ's full-service radio format leaned toward middle of the road music, but also featuring an increasing amount of rock and roll. Within a few years, after the demise of top 40 on WCOP (1150 AM, now WWDJ) in 1962 and with WMEX (1510 AM) as the lone top 40 in Boston, WBZ switched to a full-time top 40 format. The combination of hit music, popular hosts (such as evening DJ "Juicy Brucie" Bradley who did the daily top-10 countdown), powerful signal, and top-notch news coverage, made WBZ the dominant radio station in the market. It continued to run public affairs programming including "Shape-up Boston", "Stomp Smoking" and the 1969 "T-Group 15", a project produced by public affairs director Jerry Wishnow in which nine black and white school-decentralization activists in a room for 22 hours with microphones and cameras until compromises were reached. The edited broadcast included four hours of audience reaction with the participants and was aired on WBZ for 15 hours without commercials.

WBZ re-established an FM station on December 15, 1957, transmitting from the brand new WBZ-TV tower in Needham, operating at 106.7 MHz. This incarnation of WBZ-FM provided limited simulcasts of the AM station and largely had its own programming, including classical music and Ed Beech's Just Jazz program from WRVR in New York City. The station remained in mono through this period, but beginning on December 31, 1971, an automated top 40 format was launched in stereo, apparently in an attempt to blunt the popularity of WRKO (680 AM). WBZ-FM was sold by Group W (which Westinghouse had rebranded its broadcasting division in 1963) to Greater Media in 1981, ultimately becoming WMJX.

WBZA continued to serve Springfield with a simulcast of WBZ's programming until July 1962, when the East Springfield transmitter was shut down to allow Westinghouse to purchase WINS in New York City, as the company already owned seven AM radio stations — the maximum allowed by the Federal Communications Commission (FCC) at that time. The closure of WBZA ended over 40 years of transmission from East Springfield. The towers continued to stand atop the former Westinghouse plant in East Springfield for five more decades, until their removal on November 5, 2011, to accommodate redevelopment at the site of the factory. By then, they were among the oldest broadcast facilities still standing.

Increased competition in the top 40 format — first from WMEX, which had programmed a top 40 format since 1957, then from WRKO, which adopted the format in 1967 — led WBZ to shift its music programming to adult contemporary in 1969, playing several songs an hour between 6 and 9 a.m. (though it was not unheard of for Carl DeSuze to play only one, if any, song an hour during his show), 10 to 12 songs an hour between 9 a.m. and 4 p.m., and 4 to 6 songs an hour between 4 and 7 p.m. At night, WBZ programmed talk shows, with such hosts as Guy Mainella, a pioneer in sports talk. Also heard were Jerry Williams in the evenings and Larry Glick's overnight show (the latter two held the same popular shifts at WMEX years earlier). Music was programmed during the day on weekends. This format was similar to sister station KDKA in Pittsburgh. By 1978, Mainella, who had been the host of Calling All Sports since its inception on July 15, 1969, had been replaced with Bob Lobel and Upton Bell. For much of its time as a full-service AC, WBZ used the slogan "The Spirit of New England" (made famous by a 1988 JAM Creative Productions jingle package of the same name).

Beginning in the late 1960s, WBZ made a major push into live play-by-play sports. From 1966 through 1979, and again from 1991 through 1994, WBZ was home to radio broadcasts of New England Patriots football. This brought Gil Santos to the station. In the fall of 1969, WBZ regained the radio rights to the Boston Bruins (which it had lost in 1951), and began carrying Boston Celtics basketball. The Bruins stayed through the 1977–78 season. The Celtics left WBZ after the team's 1980–81 NBA Championship season. During the years when the Bruins and Celtics were both on WBZ and both playing at the same time, one of them (usually the Celtics) would be heard on WBZ-FM. WBZ broadcast the United States Football League's Boston Breakers during the 1983 season (its lone season in Boston). Also heard were Boston College Eagles football from 1987 through 1991. Starting in 1972, WBZ's football broadcasts featured the play-by-play team of Gil Santos and Gino Cappelletti.

During the 1970s, WBZ was one of a number of clear channel AM stations that petitioned to be allowed to increase their power. WBZ would have used 500,000 watts transmitting from Provincetown, Massachusetts, to reach all of New England during the day. A backlash from smaller stations led to the petition being denied and station protections limited to a 750-mile radius.

WBZ became an affiliate of ABC Radio on January 1, 1980; ABC was the descendant of the Blue Network, which WBZ had dropped 38 years earlier. The ABC affiliation allowed the station to begin airing Paul Harvey's daily broadcasts, which were previously heard in Boston on WEZE (1260 AM, now WBIX) and, later, WECB, the carrier current station at Emerson College. Later in the year, a schedule shuffle ended Carl DeSuze's run on the morning show (which was taken over by Dave Maynard), and he was moved to middays; the overnight show was then taken over by Bob Raleigh, who had been WBZ's midday host since June 1976. Calling All Sports was also dropped in favor of an early evening talk show, hosted at various points by David Finnegan, Lou Marcel, and Peter Meade. Former overnight host Larry Glick was moved first into late evenings and then into afternoons, and ultimately left the station in May 1987.

=== 1985–2003: becoming a news/talk station ===
Late in 1985, American Top 40 moved to WBZ from WROR (98.5 FM, now WBZ-FM); it would remain on WBZ until the program moved to WZOU (94.5 FM, now WJMN) in 1988. Other music programming on WBZ was cut back during the 1980s; for instance, an expanded afternoon news block was launched on December 2, 1985. The following year, David Brudnoy began to host the station's late-evening talk show. In June 1990, WBZ announced that it would replace Brudnoy with Tom Snyder's ABC Radio talk show, with his last show airing July 13; listener complaints led the station to return Brudnoy to the air by the end of September.

WBZ continued its full-service AC format—by this point featuring four songs an hour—until January 1991, when Gulf War coverage led the station to stop playing music on a regular basis and pivot to news and talk full-time, joining WRKO and WHDH (850 AM, now WEEI) in the format. Program director David Bernstein, upon hearing the news of the war's start, ordered the on-duty engineer to remove the music carousel from the studio, vowing that, "This station will never play music again." Even before the war, Bernstein had been considering dropping music from WBZ, theorizing that the station's listeners were listening for the personalities and not the songs. Separately, morning show producer Bill Flaherty and morning host Tom Bergeron also concluded that it was not appropriate for WBZ to play music in the midst of the war. The format change became permanent on March 4, 1991; concurrently, WBZ began promoting itself as "Boston's News Station", positioning the station as the primary competitor for all-news station WEEI (590 AM, now WEZE). WBZ has, from time to time, played music on special occasions even after the change to news/talk; the station still offered 24 hours of Christmas music beginning on Christmas Eve through 1995, and it carried the audio of the Boston Pops' Fourth of July concert and fireworks display from 2003 through 2016. Additionally, WBZ, along with sister stations WODS (103.3 FM, now WBGB) and WZLX (100.7 FM), carried the Beatles Let It Be... Naked album premiere on November 13, 2003.

When WEEI dropped its all-news format for all-sports programming in September 1991, WBZ began a marketing campaign to convince former WEEI listeners to switch to WBZ; this was followed on January 13, 1992, with a shift to all-news programming during drive time (5 to 10 a.m. and 3 to 7 p.m.). On September 28 the station became an all-news station from 5 a.m.–7 p.m. following the end of the two midday talk shows hosted by Tom Bergeron, who had moved to middays following the launch of the morning news block (the noon hour, which separated the Bergeron shifts, was already occupied by a news program); the station's nighttime programming continued to be filled by David Brudnoy and Bob Raleigh's talk shows.

Initially, the new format was not carried over to WBZ's weekend schedule; while a weekend morning news block was launched, the weekend afternoon schedule remained devoted to specialty talk shows until September 3, 1994, when the station introduced information-oriented sports shows, branded as WBZ Sports Saturday and WBZ Sports Sunday. WBZ's sports commitment included the return of the Boston Bruins Radio Network to the station in 1995; however, the station lost the New England Patriots to WBCN (104.1 FM, now WWBX) starting with the 1995 season, and for several seasons afterward WBZ was an affiliate of the New York Giants Radio Network. NFL regulations only allowed WBZ to carry Giants' games not played at the same time as Patriots' games. As with the weekday lineup, talk continued to be programmed at night, including three of the specialty shows (Kid Company on Saturday evenings and a revived Calling All Sports and Looking at the Law on Sunday evenings), a Saturday night talk show hosted by Lovell Dyett, and an overnight show with former WHDH host Norm Nathan.

WBZ added an affiliation with the CBS Radio Network on March 6, 1995, making it one of a handful of stations to carry both CBS Radio and ABC Radio (however, the station ceased an affiliation with CNN Radio). Five months later, on August 1, Westinghouse announced that it was purchasing CBS, a transaction that was completed on November 24; as a result, WBZ came under the CBS Radio banner. Two years later, 76 years of Westinghouse ownership came to an end when the Westinghouse Electric Corporation changed its name to CBS Corporation on December 1, 1997. CBS's radio stations, including WBZ, were spun off into a new public company, Infinity Broadcasting Corporation, in 1998 (a move that removed the Group W name from the station's license); Viacom announced its acquisition of the publicly held stake in Infinity on August 15, 2000 (shortly after it merged with CBS Corporation), a transaction completed on February 21, 2001 (though Viacom, and CBS before the merger, had always held a majority stake in Infinity). Even after coming under common ownership with the CBS Radio Network, it would not be until 2000 before CBS's hourly newscast replaced ABC's during WBZ's overnight programming.

As its ownership shifted, WBZ continued to modify its program schedule. After Norm Nathan's death on October 29, 1996, his Friday night/Saturday morning show was taken over by Steve LeVeille, and his Saturday night/Sunday morning show went to former WSSH-FM (99.5, now WCRB) morning host Jordan Rich. Bob Lobel (by now WBZ-TV's sports director) and Upton Bell returned to the station on May 17, 1997, for a Sunday night sports show (with Calling All Sports moving to Saturdays). Another sports show, The McDonoughs on Sports with Sean McDonough and Will McDonough aired during the 1997 NFL season as a lead-in to CBS Radio Sports' broadcast of Monday Night Football, preempting David Brudnoy's program; the first two hours of his Friday show were preempted in favor of a cooking show, Olives' Table with Todd English, from August 1997 through August 1998.

The Sports Saturday and Sports Sunday blocks were discontinued in April 1998 in favor of an expansion of the all-news format to weekend afternoons; Calling All Sports and The Bob Lobel Show were not affected, though Lobel's show was replaced with Sunday Sports Page with Dan Roche and Steve DeOssie that July after a management-ordered cut-off of a call on the July 12 broadcast drove Lobel to resign from his show on July 13. Bob Raleigh began to cut back his on-air presence during the late 1990s, with Kevin Sowyrda taking over the Sunday night/Monday morning slot for a time; he eventually retired on June 9, 1999, with Steve LeVeille taking his place in the overnight hours and Jordan Rich taking over the Friday night/Saturday morning show. Shortly afterward, David Brudnoy gave up the 10 p.m.-12 a.m. portion of his show; this timeslot was given to Lowell Sun columnist and former WLLH (1400 AM) host Paul Sullivan.

For a time starting in the fall of 2001, the station relaunched the 1 p.m. hour of the Midday News as the WBZ Business Hour, with an increased focus on business news; this program was similar to one on Los Angeles sister station KNX (WBZ has since returned to regular news in the 1 p.m. hour). Later that year, weekend sports talk was abandoned completely, with Calling All Sports, which had been a leased-time program owned and produced by Norm Resha since its revival in 1991, moving to WTKK (96.9 FM) on December 2. WBZ then launched a Saturday evening talk show hosted by Pat Desmarais, while a simulcast of the CBS television program 60 Minutes was added on Sunday evenings on January 13, 2002.

=== 2003–2017 ===
Horizontal version of WBZ's current logo, used since July 1, 2010

David Brudnoy announced on September 23, 2003, that he had skin cancer (he had also been fighting AIDS since 1994); a farewell broadcast aired on December 8, 2004, and he died the next day, with tribute shows airing over the following two nights. Per Brudnoy's wish, Paul Sullivan took over the 8 p.m.–midnight time slot in January 2005, with the 7 p.m. hour given to an expansion of the WBZ Afternoon News. That March, WBZ began streaming its programming on the web, along with Infinity's other news and talk stations.

When Viacom split into two companies on December 31, 2005, Infinity became part of the new CBS Corporation and reverted to the CBS Radio name. That same day, WBZ dropped Paul Harvey after the station's contract to carry his broadcasts expired (however, despite coming under the CBS Radio banner once more, the station still maintains an affiliation with ABC News Radio); in addition, the station dropped Looking at the Law, a legal advice show hosted by Neil Chayet, after its January 8, 2006, broadcast in favor of brokered financial programs.

Longtime morning news anchor Gary LaPierre, who anchored WBZ's morning newscasts for nearly 40 years, retired from WBZ at the end of 2006. Governor Mitt Romney declared the day of his final broadcast, December 29, 2006, "Gary LaPierre Day". Romney, Senator Ted Kennedy, Mayor Tom Menino, former Mayor Ray Flynn, former Governor Michael Dukakis, and other notables called in during his final broadcast. LaPierre was replaced on the WBZ Morning News with Ed Walsh, a former morning host at WOR in New York City who had been anchoring at WCBS, starting with the 9:30 a.m. half-hour of the December 29 Morning News. LaPierre continued to be heard on the station on occasion through voiceover work.

Meanwhile, evening host Paul Sullivan was fighting a brain tumor, which was discovered on November 22, 2004—shortly before Brudnoy's death. After undergoing several surgeries over the next two and a half years, Sullivan announced on June 21, 2007, that he would step down from the evening talk show, with his final show, led by Jordan Rich, airing on June 28; he died on September 9. Rich and WBZ-TV reporter Dan Rea served as substitute hosts in the interim; on October 1, Rea, who in the 1970s served as a weekend host for the station before moving to television in 1976, became the new host of the show, renamed NightSide with Dan Rea.

On December 31, 2008, WBZ let go overnight talk show host Steve LeVeille, sports anchor Tom Cuddy and Saturday night talk show hosts Lovell Dyett and Pat Desmarais. LeVeille was replaced by Jon Grayson's Overnight America, an internally-syndicated CBS Radio program based out of KMOX in St. Louis, while Dyett and Desmarais were replaced by the syndicated Kim Komando Show. After listener efforts were made to restore LeVeille and Dyett to the station, WBZ announced on January 27, 2009, that LeVeille would reassume his shift on February 2, while Dyett would host a half-hour early morning public affairs program on Sundays. Cuddy would subsequently return to the station as well that May. While Jordan Rich retained his weekend overnight show, the 2–5 a.m. portion of the program began to be simulcast on sister station WCCO in Minneapolis–Saint Paul. Long-time sports director Gil Santos retired after 38 years with the station on January 30, 2009; after a week-long fill-in by Bob Lobel, Walt Perkins took over as morning sports anchor on February 7.

The Bruins once again left WBZ following the 2008–09 season, after CBS Radio launched a third incarnation of WBZ-FM on 98.5 MHz as an all-sports station, which also took the Patriots from the former WBCN. (The station simulcast WBZ-FM's broadcast of Game 7 of the 2011 Stanley Cup Finals between the Bruins and the Vancouver Canucks, allowing fans in areas of New England not served by a Bruins radio network affiliate to hear the game; additionally, WBZ briefly carried Bruins games that conflict with WBZ-FM's Patriots broadcasts, a function that subsequently moved to WZLX. WBZ also carried a Boston Celtics broadcast on January 11, 2014, due to conflicts with both a Patriots game on current Celtics flagship station WBZ-FM and a Bruins game on WZLX.)

Ed Walsh retired after four years as morning news anchor on November 30, 2010; Rod Fritz then took over as interim anchor (with Gary LaPierre guest anchoring for a week in early December), with Joe Mathieu, formerly of Sirius XM Radio's P.O.T.U.S. channel, taking over on May 16, 2011. The station added a monthly one-hour interview show hosted by Mathieu, WBZ Newswatch, on January 26, 2012. Overnight host Steve LeVeille retired from WBZ on June 8, 2012; after a year of rotating guest hosts that included Jennifer Brien, Morgan White Jr., Bradley Jay, and Dean Johnson, Brien was named the new host on June 25, 2013. On October 3, 2013, the station announced it was canceling the Jen Brien Show with immediate effect. Bradley Jay then took over the overnight show, renamed Jay Talking.

WBZ, along with fellow CBS Radio all-news stations WINS in New York City, KYW in Philadelphia, and WNEW-FM in Washington, D.C., added an affiliation with Westwood One News in 2014. Jordan Rich ended his weekend talk show on July 3, 2016, but continues to do feature segments for the station. Joe Mathieu left WBZ on April 28, 2017; that August, the station announced Josh Binswanger, who hosted Kid Company on the station in the early 1990s and has worked for WBZ-TV, as its new morning news anchor, while Mathieu joined WGBH (89.7 FM) as its morning anchor. By the end of 2017, the staff included Deb Lawler and Josh Binswanger as morning anchors; Mary Blake and Rod Fritz as midday anchors; Jeff Brown and Laurie Kirby as afternoon anchors; and Dan Rea and Bradley Jay as nighttime talk show hosts.

=== Since 2017: End of Westinghouse heritage and sale to iHeartMedia ===
On February 2, 2017, CBS Radio announced it would merge with Entercom (which locally owned WEEI, WEEI-FM, WKAF, WRKO and WAAF); the sale would be conducted using a Reverse Morris Trust so that it would be tax-free. While CBS shareholders retained a 72% ownership stake in the combined company, Entercom was the surviving entity, separating WBZ radio (both 1030 and FM 98.5) from WBZ-TV and WSBK-TV; for the first time since WBZ-TV's inception in 1948, WBZ radio and television would be under separate ownership. On October 10, CBS Radio announced that as part of the process of obtaining regulatory approval of the merger, WBZ would be one of sixteen stations that would be divested by Entercom, along with sister stations WBZ-FM and WZLX, as well as WRKO and WKAF (WBMX, WODS, WEEI AM/FM and WAAF would be retained by Entercom, while WBZ-FM would be traded to Beasley Broadcast Group in exchange for WMJX).

On November 1, iHeartMedia announced that it would acquire WBZ (AM), WZLX, WRKO and WKAF. To meet ownership limits set by the FCC, WKOX would be divested to the Ocean Stations Trust in preparation for a permanent buyer. The merger was approved on November 9, 2017, and was consummated on November 17. iHeart then began operating WBZ, WKAF, and WZLX under a local marketing agreement. The sale of WBZ, WRKO, WZLX, and WKAF to iHeart was completed on December 19, 2017, ending WBZ's 96 years of lineage under the same ownership. As part of the sale, CBS Corporation entered into a long-term license agreement with iHeartMedia and Beasley Broadcast Group for continued usage of the call sign on both WBZ and WBZ-FM; a CBS subsidiary, CBS Mass Media Corp., continues to hold the trademark for "WBZ" as a brand.

On March 30, 2018, iHeartMedia announced that anchor Rod Fritz was let go. On August 25, 2018, after 70 years, WBZ left the Soldiers Field Road studios (which continue to house WBZ-TV) and moved to facilities on Cabot Road in Medford, putting it in the same building as iHeartMedia's other Boston stations. On January 15, 2020, as part of an iHeartMedia restructuring, WBZ laid off political commentator Jon Keller (who remained with WBZ-TV), morning news anchor Deb Lawler, overnight host Bradley Jay, and sports anchor Tom Cuddy.

== Hall of Fame ==
In February 2007, the station created the WBZ Radio Hall of Fame. Gary LaPierre was the first inductee, on February 16; Gil Santos was the second when he was inducted on July 9, 2009, and Dave Maynard was the third with his induction on September 15, 2009. Carl DeSuze became the fourth inductee (and the first to be inducted posthumously) on September 19, 2011, coinciding with WBZ's 90th anniversary.

== Awards ==
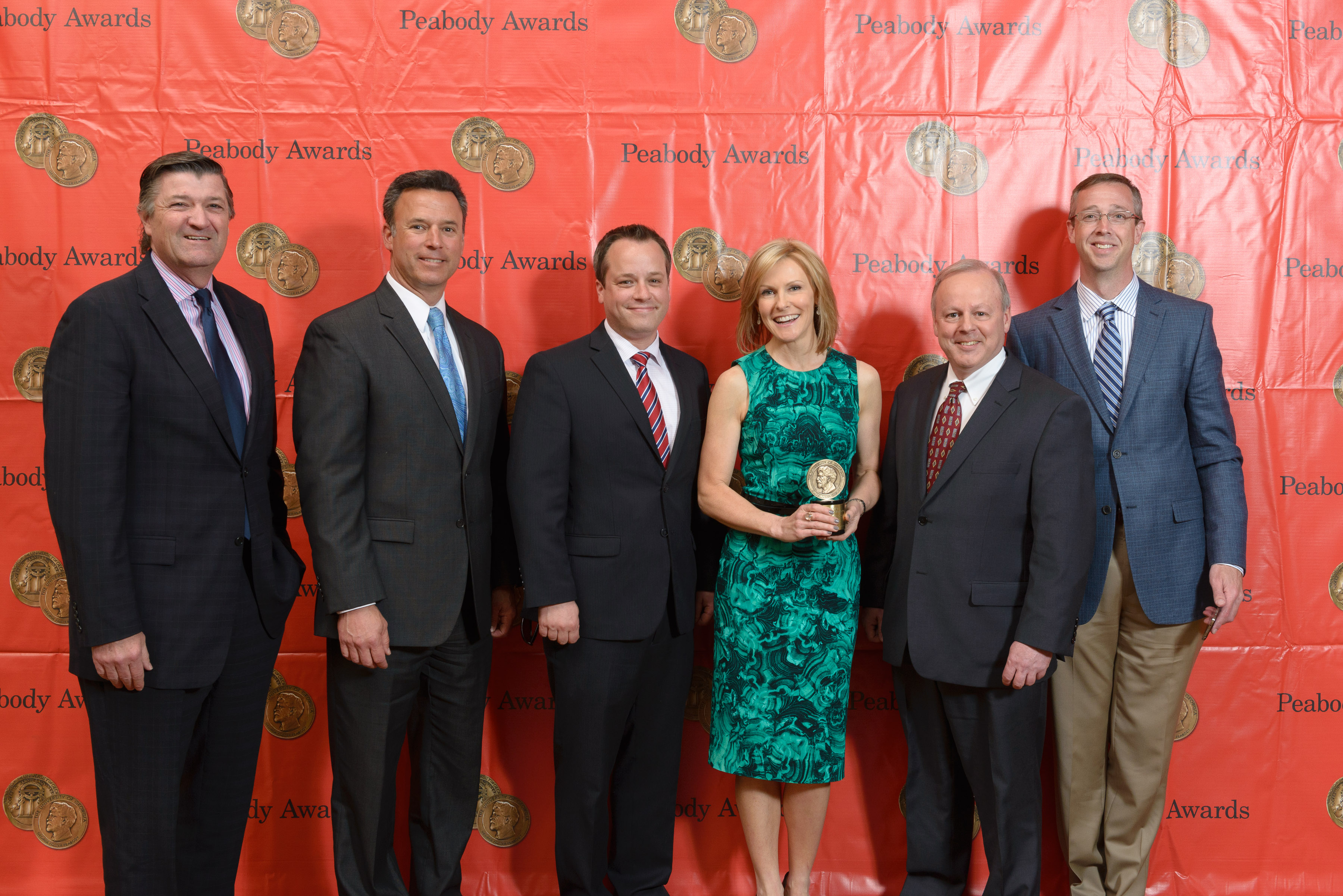
Jonathan Elias, Joe Mathieu, Lisa Hughes and Peter Casey at the 73rd Annual Peabody Awards for WBZ's coverage of the Boston Marathon bombing.

WBZ received the 2010 Marconi Radio Award in the legendary stations category from the National Association of Broadcasters.

In 2014, WBZ, along with sister station at the time, WBZ-TV, received a Peabody Award for its coverage of the Boston Marathon bombing.

The station has won numerous Regional Edward R. Murrow Awards for excellence in journalism. In 2017, awards included Overall Excellence, Best Newscast, Excellence in Social Media, and Excellence in Writing. In 2016, WBZ went on to win the National Edward R. Murrow Award for Best Newscast.

== Notable on-air staff ==
- David Brudnoy
- Neil Chayet – Looking at the Law
- Larry Glick
- Gary LaPierre
- Dan Rea
- Jordan Rich
- Matt Shearer
- Jerry Williams

== See also ==
- List of initial AM-band station grants in the United States
- List of three-letter broadcast call signs in the United States

== Notes and references ==
Preceded by 590 WEEI	Radio home of the New England Patriots; 1991–1995	Succeeded by 104.1 WBCN
Preceded by 590 WBNW	Radio home of the Boston Bruins; 1995–2009	Succeeded by 98.5 WBZ-FM
