= Larry Glick =

American radio talk-show host

- Born: May 16, 1922; Massachusetts, US
- Died: March 26, 2009 (aged 86); Boca Raton Community Hospital, Boca Raton, Florida
- Other names: "Commander" Glick; "Streeter" Glick
- Education: Roxbury Memorial High School; Emerson College
- Occupation: Radio announcer
- Years active: 40+
- Known for: Boston-based radio talk show; "The Story Behind the Story"
- Notable work: Comedy Album "Larry Glick? Let Me Check."
- Awards: Massachusetts Broadcasters Hall of Fame, 2008

Larry Glick (May 16, 1922 – March 26, 2009) was an American talk radio host based in Boston, Massachusetts, who presented a long-running show on WBZ and later WHDH during the 1960s, 1970s and 1980s. Due to WBZ's clear-channel signal, his broadcasts reached listeners across much of the United States. His program featured conversations with callers on a wide range of subjects, including personal issues and current events. Glick developed a large overnight audience and became known for his conversational style and interactions with listeners.

In Boston, Glick's all-night show went out first over WMEX in 1965. In 1967, he was hired by WBZ, where he worked for the next 20 years. Glick ended his radio career at WHDH in 1992.

From his retirement until 2007, Glick was the Ambassador of Good Will for the Legal Sea Foods Restaurant in the Boca Raton Mall in Florida. In September 2008, he was inducted into the Massachusetts Broadcasters Hall of Fame at Massasoit Community College in Dedham, Massachusetts.

Outside of his broadcasting career, Glick was trained as a pilot and was a founding partner in a commercial hypnotherapy business in Brookline, Massachusetts.

Glick died on March 26, 2009, following complications during open-heart surgery.
