= Community Auditions =

Boston-based televised talent competition

- Logo for Community Auditions, 1977
- Created by: George Riseman
- Directed by: Barry Schulman
- Presented by: Gene Jones, Dave Maynard
- Opening theme: "Star of the Day"
- Composer: Bob Winter

Production
- Producers: Louis Iacoviello, Ruth Clenott
- Running time: 30 minutes

Original release
- Network: WBZ-TV, WCVB-TV
- Release: 1950 – 1987

Community Auditions was an amateur televised talent show which ran on Sunday mornings in the Boston area for thirty-seven years. In 1985 it was the second-longest running show on television, second only to Meet the Press.

== Early Years ==
Televised talent shows such as Original Amateur Hour and Arthur Godfrey's Talent Scouts were becoming popular. George Riseman, an advertising executive who had produced shows for radio, originally conceived of Community Auditions as a radio talent show. WBZ decided to air a talent program sponsored by local Waltham-based optometrist, Community Opticians. The show's name "Community Auditions" was a play on their sponsor's name. The show debuted in August 1950 with Gene Jones as the show's first host. Jones, a former bandleader, was the on air host until 1967.

== Format ==
Community Auditions was a thirty-minute television show with a live studio audience at WBZ's studios in Allston, Massachusetts. Called "New England's home for talented amateurs," it was hosted by Gene Jones until 1965 and then Dave Maynard until the show's end in 1987. Ruth Clenott became the producer and talent coordinator in 1967. She would write a list of notes for the show which Dave Maynard would use to frame his remarks which were ad-libbed for the program. The show originally aired at 3:30 in the afternoon but moved to a steady time slot on Sunday mornings from 11 to 11:30. It was the number one show in that time slot throughout much of its run with a local viewership estimated to be 350,000. Each episode had five performers with a wide range of talents including magicians, musicians, tap dancers and comedians. The performers originally were people who had done tryouts at the show's offices, later they came from a series of local talent shows hosted by organizations like churches or fraternal organizations as combination fundraisers and talent scouting. Approximately 2,000 acts per year went through some level of tryouts.

Performers would perform their talents on a spare stage with the Community Auditions sign hanging behind them. The studio also featured a three-piece house band under the supervision of music director Bob Winter, including Shelly Merrill on piano, who would accompany the theme music and performers who needed music. At the end of the show, viewers were asked to vote by sending a postcard to the television station. The show would get between 1500 and 15,000 postcard votes weekly. The winner was announced on the show the following week, and prizes were awarded. While the popular vote nearly always determined the winner, occasionally people would try to rig votes so Clenott added a panel of judges whose decision was the final one. Winners from regular competition would proceed to semi-finals and then finals.

The show would occasionally feature themed competitions for people from particular professions, such as fire fighters, or from certain demographics, such as octogenarians. Notable contestants on the show included Sarah Silverman, Renee Sands, and Scott Grimes. The show attracted a "camp following" among college students. Host Maynard said it was important for him that the show be "done for its own sweet self" and not turn into a Gong Show situation.

== Dave Maynard Talent Showcase ==
In 1986 the show moved from WBZ-TV to WCVB-TV after an estimated 1600 programs. Maynard and his producer Ruth Clenott wanted WBZ to promote the show more or put it into syndication. Maynard did not feel that WBZ was taking the show seriously and wanted a better home for it. WCVB promised to "promote the hell out of it." There were some legal disputes about the rights to the name; the show was renamed The Dave Maynard Talent Showcase and for a short time was being broadcast on WCVB while reruns of Community Auditions were playing on WBZ. Most people still referred to the new show as Community Auditions.

== Revival ==
The original show stopped airing in 1987 but returned in 2007 as Community Auditions Star of the Day with Chuck Armstrong as executive producer, Dave Maynard as a consultant, and Lori Grande and Jackson Blue as hosts. Meghan Trainor was a contestant on the show. The new show focused only on musical acts. Viewers could vote for their favorite act via Facebook, Twitter or on the show's website.
