= Paul Sullivan (radio) =

American journalist

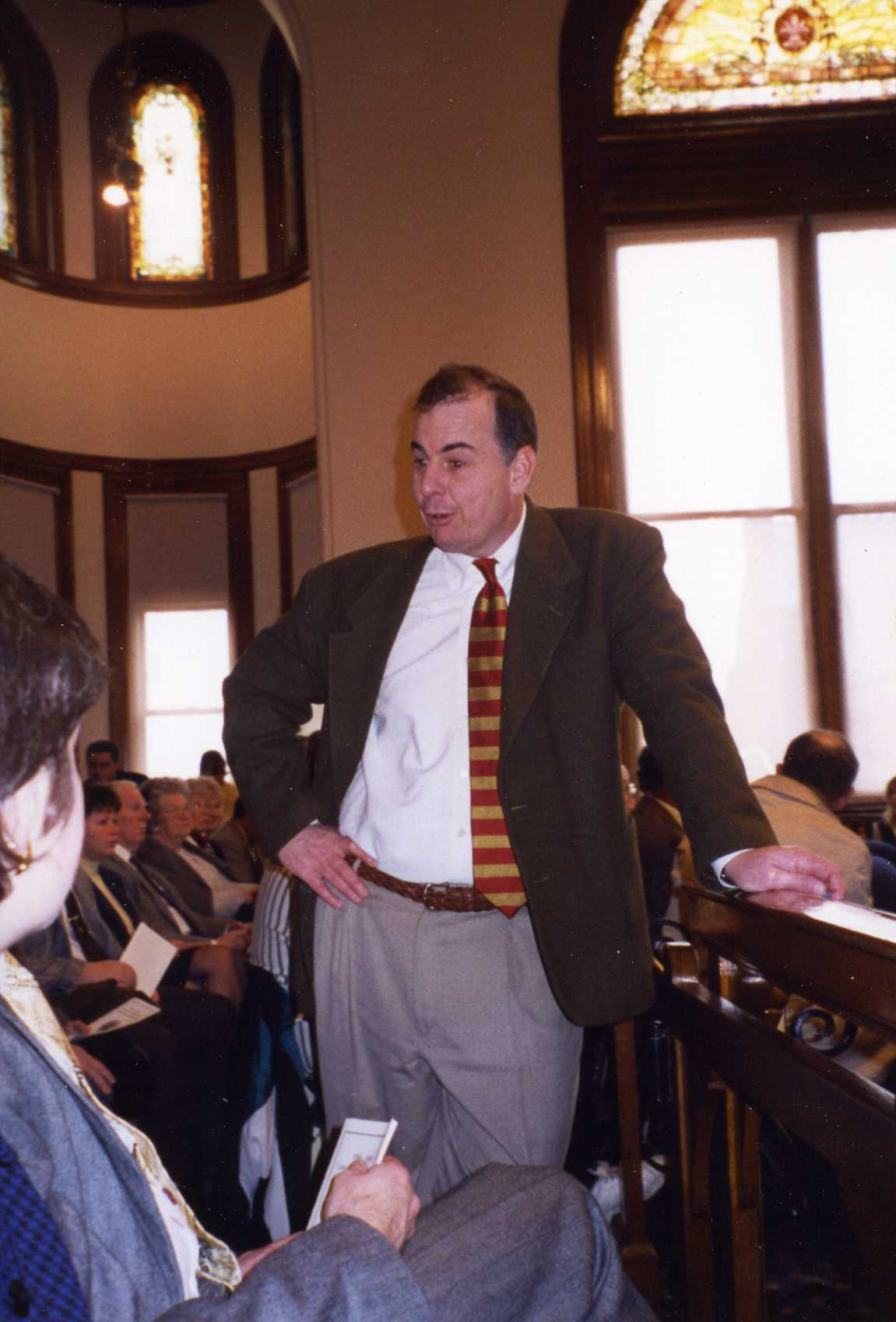
Paul Sullivan at Lowell City Hall

Paul Harold "Sully" Sullivan (May 24, 1957 – September 9, 2007) was an accomplished radio talk-show host of "The Paul Sullivan Show" on WBZ radio. He was best known for his blue-collar politics and plebeian attitude.

== Biography ==
Sullivan was born in Lowell, Massachusetts and lived most of his life in Tewksbury, Massachusetts where his father and grandfather had been on the town's Board of Selectmen. Sullivan would later serve on the Board himself. He graduated from Austin Preparatory School in 1975, from UMass Lowell with a degree in political science, and from Simmons College with a Masters in Communications Management.

Sullivan began his career as a columnist and political editor for the Lowell Sun in 1991. His radio career began at WLLH in Lowell during the late 1980s. He hosted the "Morning Magazine" program. He started broadcasting in Boston as a substitute talker on WRKO in 1996. Sullivan would later appear on a TV news roundtable on WCVB called "Five on Five." It was on this show that a popular WBZ talk show host, David Brudnoy, spotted Sullivan and recruited him for WBZ radio. He began working as a talk show host for WBZ in 1999. Upon his death, Dan Rea took over his time slot and the show was renamed "Nightside".

Sullivan also was a columnist and political editor of the Lowell Sun newspaper, in Lowell.

== Family life ==
Paul fathered three children, Ryan, Charlie and Kerri. Ryan Sullivan (born 1983) is an Assistant District Attorney for Middlesex County in Massachusetts. Charlie Smith (at the time known as Ashley Sullivan) was featured on American Idol on the 10th season in 2011.

== Illness ==
Hours before his death from cancer in 2004, David Brudnoy picked Sullivan as his successor for the evening WBZ talk radio slot. Sullivan himself was diagnosed with Stage IV melanoma and underwent surgery just weeks earlier in November 2004. He continued to fight his cancer until leaving the show during the summer of 2007 after five brain surgeries. Sullivan died on September 9, 2007.

Sullivan was an adjunct professor of journalism and communications at Middlesex Community College, where his two daughters later attended. Shortly after his death, Middlesex Community College named their leadership institute after him.
