= Jerry Wishnow =

American writer

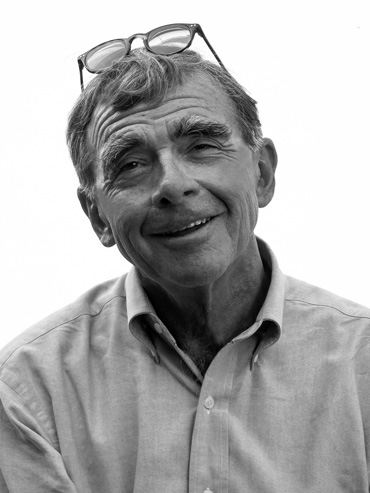
- Education: B.A. Northeastern University; M.A. Northwestern University
- Occupations: Activist, broadcaster, entrepreneur

Jerry Wishnow is an American activist, entrepreneur, and founder of the Wishnow Group Inc., a company that developed and produced campaigns aimed at intervening in social problems through mutually beneficial partnerships between media, nonprofits, and business. The projects have reduced infant mortality, property crime, changed drug laws, and added anti-discrimination curricula to U.S. and international schools.

Wishnow contributed his copy written name "AmeriCorps" to the Clinton White House as the official title of what has become the domestic version of the Peace Corps.

Wishnow and his campaigns have received over 70 national and regional awards including a Peabody award, three National Emmy awards, and four Presidential commendations.

== Career ==
Wishnow attended Northeastern University in Boston and earned a BA in English Journalism. As a student editor at Northeastern, he was physically threatened while covering the 1963 Selma, Alabama racial unrest. He later earned a Master of Journalism degree from the Northwestern University Medill School of Journalism, Evanston, IL. In 1967, he covered the "Summer of Love" in San Francisco for The Boston's Herald Traveler.

He started his work at 50,000 Watt WBZ radio (Westinghouse broadcasting) Boston in 1968 as a public affairs director and producer for The Jerry Williams Show. Wishnow soon became creative services director producing public affairs campaigns which were designed to use WBZ's powerful market position and resources to create positive public service campaigns designed to measurably assist its audience while promoting the station and project partners.

Wishnow launched his own firm. The Wishnow Group Inc., an activist public affairs firm based in Marblehead, Massachusetts in 1974.

The Wishnow Group has worked with nonprofits including the Anti-Defamation League and the March of Dimes, University of Chicago Hospitals, and government agencies including US Department of Energy, the Environmental Protection Agency, US Law Enforcement Systems Association, and the US Office of Juvenile Justice and Delinquency Prevention.

They have also worked with corporate clients and underwriters, including American Express, Digital Equipment Corporation, Sears, Montgomery Ward and Blue Cross Blue Shield.

== WBZ public affairs campaigns ==
=== T-Group 15 ===
In 1969, Wishnow created and produced an event which padlocked nine Boston African-American and white school decentralization activists, including Louise Day Hicks, a Boston School Committee Chairwoman who strongly opposed court ordered busing and desegregation in public schools, together in a room for over 22 ½ hours with microphones and cameras until compromises over the closing of a key black feeder school were reached The result was broadcast on WBZ. An African-American and a white psychologist were present during the experiment and the participants were given cues in a "sensitizing" environment to direct the discussion. The project was named "T-Group 15 and narrated by Boston university Sensitivity Training pioneer Dr. Malcolm Knowles. The 11-hour edited broadcast included four hours of live audience reaction with the participants and was aired on WBZ for 15 straight hours from 7AM-midnight without commercials.

=== Storm Center ===
Weeks later a historic nor'easter paralyzed New England. Wishnow convinced management to turn the station personnel and its powerful signal into an emergency communications center. Those requiring help called in on the air live and were connected to civil authorities and/or local volunteers who, in addition to advice, often delivered food and medicine and provided emergency transport. Thousands were helped and the service drew a 33% rating*.

=== Rush Hour Rescue ===
Wishnow worked with ALA Auto & Travel Club of Wellesley, Massachusetts and WBZ radio to develop a service which included a van that provided free emergency road assistance for cars that broke down on major area highways speeding up traffic during peak travel periods.

=== Commuter Computer ===
In 1969 "Commuter Computer" was a service created by Wishnow and Jerry Swerling, a public relations director of the ALA Auto & Travel Club. Listeners sent in forms with their schedules and locations. A computer (well before ubiquitous computer use) matched them up with ten people who had similar carpooling needs. Tens of thousands of people joined the effort. The project sparked carpool campaigns in Chicago, Pittsburgh, Fort Wayne, Indiana, Philadelphia, Los Angeles, San Francisco, Baltimore and Miami.

=== Stomp Smoking ===
Wishnow produced a statewide anti-smoking campaign developed by a team of physicians that was designed to provide information, anti-smoking techniques and emotional support. In addition to regular PSA's and broadcasts on WBZ, the station personalities went through their own smoking withdrawal on the air live with listeners. The project also featured access to a 24-hour telephone help-line, anti-smoking clinics, and community-centered support.

=== Shape-up Boston ===
"Shape-up Boston" was a six-month-long campaign created by Wishnow. It centered on the issues of diet exercise and nutrition. The campaign featured signed and notarized "Stomp Smoking" oaths. The project was later replicated as "Go to Health" at ABC radio in Los Angeles with support from Sears.

=== WBZ Drug Bill ===
Another project Wishnow produced was aimed at providing junior high and high school students, teachers, and parents with information on substance abuse. A family of six with serious drug issues took part in on-air drug counseling. In 1972, on-air audience discussions guided by expert attorneys led to the drafting of legislation which came to be known as the "WBZ Drug Bill," which was passed by Massachusetts State Legislature. The bill lightened penalties for possession of marijuana and led to reduction in jail sentences as a punishment for first and second offenders.

== Wishnow Group public affair campaigns ==
=== H.O.T. Car ===
"Hands off This Car" ("H.O.T. Car") was a community-based program Wishnow produced for WNAC-TV (CBS) Boston to measurably reduce car theft. The station provided two prime time specials and 500 Public Service Announcements a month plus news and other exposure at an approximate value of $2,000,000.

The public was provided a free kit including tapered door locks, kill switches, engraving tools, and a five percent reduction on car insurance underwritten by the State. If a car was stolen, the project provided free on-air stolen car reports and cash rewards. The project expanded nationally through the Montgomery Ward Auto Club and participating network owned and affiliated TV stations where it reached over 51 major US markets. In Boston the car theft rate dropped 14% statewide, members car theft went down 500%. And the station's ratings went up dramatically.

=== For Spacious Skies ===
Wishnow joined with Jack Borden, former news reporter for WBZ-TV Boston, to create the "For Spacious Skies" campaign, established in 1981. The campaign focused on increasing awareness of the sky visibility as a way to reduce air pollution. Dr. Leonard Duhl, a psychiatrist at U.C. Berkeley reported that sensory detachment from the environment is a major factor in personal and social ill health. The board for the campaign included photographer Ansel Adams. Efforts for the campaign were funded through grants from the Environmental Protection Agency and the United States Department of Energy. As part of the push to gain awareness, "The Conference on the Sky," a three-day facilitated meeting, was held on the South Rim of the Grand Canyon. The conference included meteorologists, astronomers, photographers, musicians, writers, environmentalists, psychologists, pilots, and other professionals whose careers were connected to the sky. The project is ongoing under Borden's leadership.

=== Priority One ===
Priority One" was a year-long comprehensive property crime prevention project designed to provide the public with education and tools to make their homes and neighborhoods more secure. Wishnow produced the project in cooperation with WNAC-TV (CBS) Boston and the Massachusetts Police Chiefs Association. Local police patrolman in hundreds of Massachusetts cities and towns personally knocked on doors of every house or apartment within their jurisdiction, introduced themselves, and presented a free kit containing anti-theft information and devices including special locks and engraving tools. GTE and Stop & Shop provided blue light bulbs that participants could display in their windows once they had hardened up their homes. The project received a National Emmy award. Property theft went down 21% in Boston during this period.

=== A World of Difference ===
"A World of Difference," a year-long project that was created by Wishnow with WCVB TV for the Anti-Defamation League's New England Director Lenny Zakim. It was first tested in Boston. It was designed to stem acts of bigotry in schools and communities with the help of scores of WCVB produced, award-winning, half hour and one-hour prime time programs and PSAS. It centered on a national and locally created curriculum guidebook initially published by The Boston Globe and used in schools throughout the state. The year-long campaign was then brought, with programming contributed by WCVB-TV and other participating stations, to the top 30 national markets. It was broadcast through network owned and affiliate TV stations reaching over 70% of the country in partnership with major newspapers such as the New York Times and The Chicago Tribune. The project, through the Anti-defamation League, is now a fixture in K–12 curriculum, in 14 countries in addition to the United States. The campaign has won Wishnow a part in two national Emmy awards for community service, as well as a Peabody award.

=== Partnership for a Drug Free America ===
Wishnow was hired by the Federal Office of Juvenile Justice and Delinquency Prevention and NBC TV Network to design a process that would bring over 100 national drug and alcohol stakeholders to participate in a facilitated session designed to create a common vision to confront drug and alcohol abuse. The marathon session was held in Williamsburg VA. The industry led group that grew directly from that event created the Partnership for a Drug Free America.

=== The Volunteer Connection ===
Wishnow brought a year-long, media promoted process to recruit, screen, train and recognize volunteers that was undertaken in Dallas-Fort Worth spearheaded by The Junior League with major contributions from KXAS-TV (NBC), The Hogg Foundation, The United Way and D/FW Volunteer Center. Dallas philanthropist and project leader Lyda Hill who managed the community aspect of the project accepted The President's 1986 Volunteer Action Award on behalf of the participants from President Reagan at the White House.

=== Beautiful Babies: Right From the Start ===
"Beautiful Babies ... Right from the Start" was a Wishnow created project to combat infant mortality. The campaign was tested in 1987 in Washington at WRC TV (NBC) which provided airtime over eighteen months. The PSA's alone were a “phenomenal 350 gross rating points a week. Three or four more times the exposure that major advertisers might buy." It was carried out by the March of Dimes and paid for by Blue Cross Blue Shield of the National Capitol Area. The New York Times reported that Blue Cross insurance claims for seriously ill babies decreased by over million dollars during the campaign. Pregnant women received a free coupon book for baby care and supplies worth hundreds of dollars. The books were made available at drugstores, medical clinics, by phone and mailed out by the March of Dimes. They included emergency numbers and steps for good perinatal health. The coupons could only be used when stamped after each monthly prenatal care visit by qualified medical personnel. In other words, No Compliance to care—No coupons. The results: an estimated 70,000 residents received coupon books; all-important prenatal visits to clinics increased by 22% in the first year and infant mortality decreased 7%. The project was enhanced and replicated in Chicago with the University of Chicago hospitals and WBBM TV.

== Publications ==
Wishnow authored the book The Activist: How to Create Measurable Public Affairs Projects which was edited by Paul La Camera and published by the National Broadcast Association for Community Affairs in 1983 with underwriting from J.C. Penney.

The Paley Center for Media, Manhattan/Los Angeles, has included numerous Wishnow created project audio and video materials in its permanent collection.

== Personal life ==
Wishnow lives in Marblehead, Massachusetts with his wife, scientist and entrepreneur Peipei Wu Wishnow PhD.
