= A Rare Live Recording of Billie Holiday =

A Rare Live Recording Of Billie Holiday

Live album by Billie Holiday
- Released: 1964
- Recorded: October 28, 1951 & November 1, 1951; Storyville Club, Boston
- Genre: Vocal jazz
- Length: 35:49
- Label: Recording Industries Corp. – M2001

Billie Holiday chronology
Ladylove (1962)	A Rare Live Recording Of Billie Holiday (1964)

A Rare Live Recording Of Billie Holiday is a live album by jazz singer Billie Holiday, compiling material recorded over two nights at Boston's Storyville Club in 1951, and released by the small Recording Industries Corporation label in 1964. The material was originally broadcast on the radio station WMEX. The album documents one of the few recordings of Holiday performing her live set at a nightclub.

== Content ==
The recordings on the album were posthumously released by a small label in the 1960s, sourced from a series of radio broadcasts made on Boston's WMEX, live from city's Storyville Club in 1951. Late that year, Holiday had performed for a week in the club, accompanied by the pianist and arranger Buster Harding and a rhythm section. She was interviewed at the time by Nat Hentoff, a local jazz critic and historian working for WMEX as well as Down Beat, who described her as being at the time joyful, responsible, and cooperative, due to her recent marriage to Louis McKay. As well as arriving on time for every set, she volunteered to perform extra sets specifically for the radio broadcast. Sharing the bill was Stan Getz, who Holiday praised for his ability to swing, and the two collaborated for several tunes that were also broadcast and included in this album.

The material on this album has been rereleased many times since, sometimes with different artwork and title, and sometimes adding other songs sourced from the same series of WMEX radio broadcasts.

== Track listing ==
Side One

1. Billie's Blues (Billie Holiday) 2:53
2. Lover Man (Jimmy Davis, Roger ("Ram") Ramirez, and James Sherman) 2:55
3. Them There Eyes (Maceo Pinkard, Doris Tauber and William Tracey) 1:40
4. My Man (Jacques Charles, Channing Pollock, Albert Willemetz, and Maurice Yvain, Intro-Holiday) 3:14
5. I Cover The Waterfront (Johnny Green Edward Heyman) 3:35
6. Crazy He Calls Me (Carl Sigman and Bob Russell) 2:11
7. Lover Come Back To Me (Sigmund Romberg, Oscar Hammerstein II) 2:33

Side Two

1. Detour Ahead (Herb Ellis, John Frigo, and Lou Carter) 2:24
2. Strange Fruit (Abel Meeropol) 3:16
3. Drivin' Me Crazy (Walter Donaldson) 1:31
4. Ain't Nobody's Business If I Do (Porter Grainger and Everett Robbins) 2:58
5. All Of Me (Gerald Marks and Seymour Simons) 1:41
6. I Loves You Porgy (George Gershwin and Ira Gershwin) 3:06
7. Miss Brown To You (Richard A. Whiting, Ralph Rainger, and Leo Robin) 1:52

== Personnel ==
tracks a1-7, b1, b4-7: November 1, 1951

- Bass, John Fields
- Drums, Marquis Foster
- Piano, Buster Harding

tracks b2-b3: October 28, 1951

- Announcer, Nat Hentoff
- Bass, John Fields / Teddy Kotick
- Drums, Marquis Foster
- Guitar, Jimmy Raney
- Piano, Al Haig / Buster Harding
- Tenor Sax, Stan Getz
- Art Direction, Illustration, Burt Goldblatt
- Liner Notes, Nat Hentoff
