= Dan Rea =

American radio journalist

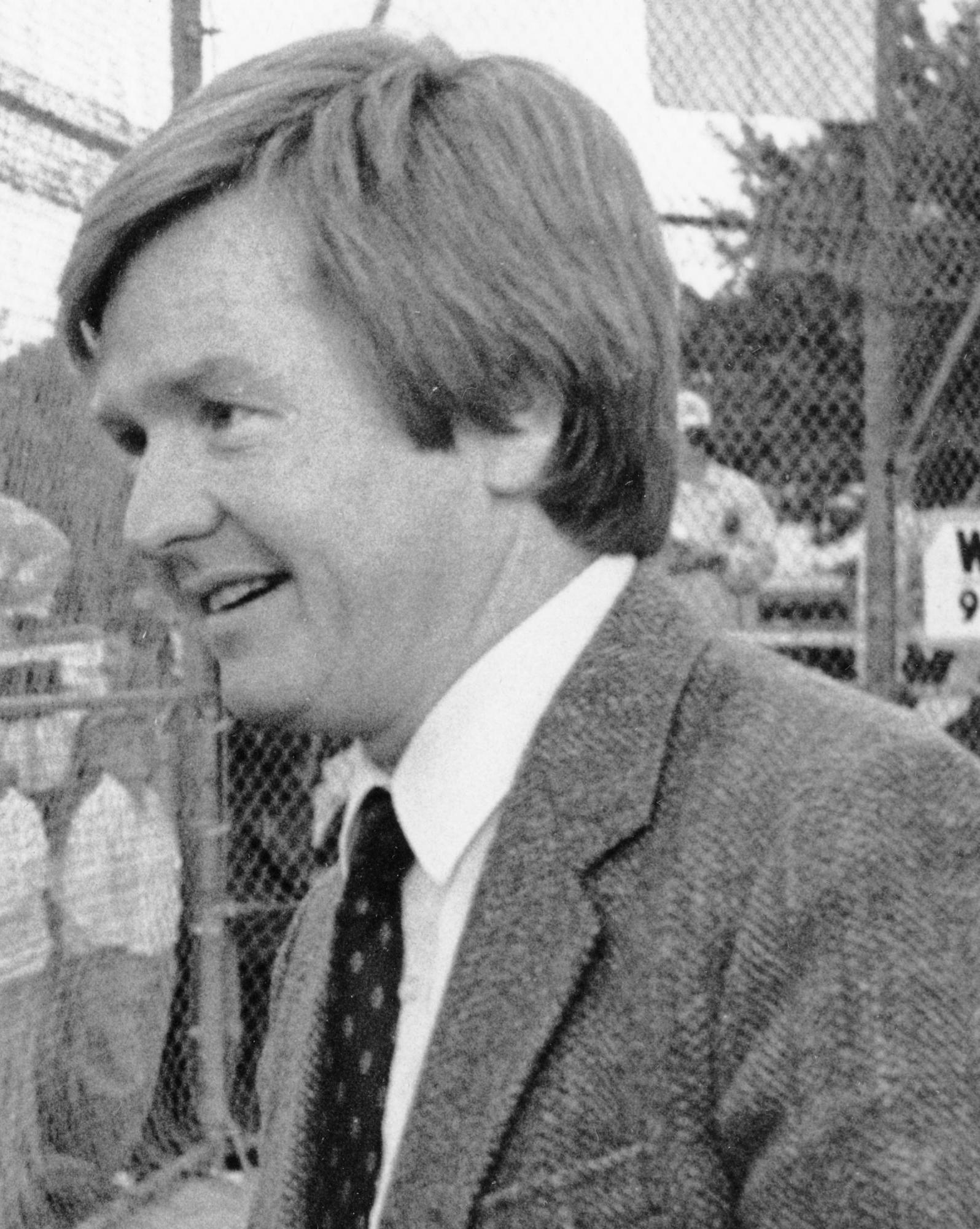
- Rea in the 1980s
- Born: Boston, Massachusetts
- Education: Boston State College (B.A., 1970); Boston University School of Law (J.D., 1974)
- Occupation: Talk radio host

Dan Rea is an American radio personality and former newscaster. He is currently the conservative-leaning host of NightSide with Dan Rea on WBZ radio.

== Education and background ==
A graduate of Boston Latin School (Class of 1966), Boston State College (English major) and Boston University School of Law, Rea is a native Bostonian who now lives in Newton, Massachusetts. He was born at Faulkner Hospital and grew up in Readville.

== Career ==
Rea worked as a news reporter from 1976 to 2007 on WBZ's sister station, WBZ-TV, the CBS affiliate in Boston where he won two Regional Emmys and had nine Regional Emmy nominations. He also had a small role in the movie Reversal of Fortune.

In 2007, Rea began hosting his Nightside radio program following the death of Paul Sullivan, host of The Paul Sullivan Show. It marked a return to WBZ Radio for Rea, as he was previously on air there while at Boston University School of Law in the 1970s. At that time, Rea was a conservative activist "...serving as national vice chairman of Young Americans for Freedom and opposing Richard Nixon’s re-election as president in 1972 on the grounds that he was too liberal."

More recently, Rea has described his views as being libertarian conservative.

== Awards ==
Rea spent four years trying to clear the name of Joe Salvati, a man who was wrongfully convicted of murder. Rea was able to find evidence that exonerated Mr. Salvati's name and he was released from prison. For his work on the case, "the Massachusetts Bar Association honored Rea with the First Annual Excellence in Journalism Award. The Massachusetts Criminal Defense Lawyers Association for his efforts in the Salvati case also honored Rea."

In June 1988 Rea was presented with Boston University Law School's "Silver Shingle" award for outstanding public service."

In November of 2010, Rea received the "Yankee Quill Award by the Academy of New England Journalists and the New England Society of Newspaper Editors.

== Family ==
Rea and his wife Jeanne, are parents of Daniel III and Catherine Florence. Daniel Rea III is the general manager of the Worcester Red Sox.
