= Neil Chayet =

American lawyer

Neil Lewis Chayet (January 17, 1939 – August 11, 2017) was an American lawyer and radio personality.

He was known for his weekday feature program Looking at the Law (debuting April 1, 1976, on WBZ).

== Early life and education ==
Chayet graduated from Tufts University (B.A. 1960) and the Harvard Law School (J.D. 1963).

== Career ==
Chayet worked on several high-profile cases, including the Boston Strangler. As president of Chayet Communications Group, Inc., he maintained an active legal and consulting practice in the area of health law. He acted as special counsel to several law firms in Boston and Washington, D.C., and lectured on Legal Medicine in the Department of Psychiatry, Harvard Medical School, and as an adjunct professor at Tufts, where he also served on the Board of Trustees from 1971 to 1981.

Having been active in Massachusetts law and politics for most of his life, he also served as Vice President of the Boston Republican Committee. In this capacity he worked to clear the way for Mitt Romney's 2002 run for Governor.

== Personal life ==
Neil Chayet was married to Susan Chayet; they had three children (Michael, Lisa, and Ely). He later married Martha M. Chayet. After buying the Joseph Story House in 2006, they moved from Manchester-by-the-Sea to Salem.

Upon his retirement in June 2017, Chayet announced he would undergo treatment for an aggressive cancer. He died on Friday, August 11, 2017, aged 78.

== Selected publications ==
- Social and Legal Aspects of LSD Usage. In: LSD, Man & Society (1967), p. 94-126
- Legal Implications of Emergency Care (1969). LCCN 68-54561
- Neil Chayet’s Looking at the law (1981). LCCN 81-1024
- Interview with John Koch, The Boston Globe (1999)
