= Bruce Bradley (radio personality) =

American radio personality (died 2013)

Bruce Bradley

Bruce Bradley (1933 or 1934 – June 22, 2013) was an American radio personality of the 20th century.

== Biography ==
Bradley was born and raised in Rochester, New York. As a youth, he taught himself not to stutter by talking repeatedly into a tape recorder. He started in radio as a teenager in Upstate New York, working in Rochester, Troy, and Albany. He was the afternoon drive time man at WROW in Albany and a television weatherman on WTEN-TV, also in Albany.

Bradley joined WBZ-AM in Boston in 1960 and was a rock-and-roll disc jockey, with the title "Juicy Brucie" Bradley.

When Bradley joined WBZ, the station was playing middle of the road music. However, it soon transitioned toward rock-and-roll oriented top 40 fare and become the dominant radio station in the Boston market, and Bradley a popular evening disc jockey doing the daily top-10 countdown. In the summer, he broadcast from the "WBZ Sundeck Studio", a trailer equipped as a radio station, placed at Paragon Park amusement park, where his teen fans and others could see him as he broadcast. Bradley, with fellow disc jockey Arnie "Woo-Woo" Ginsburg, introduced the Beatles when they played at Suffolk Downs racetrack in Boston on August 18, 1966.

Bradley moved from evening to afternoon drive time in 1967,, then left WBZ in 1968. He returned in 1978 from WCAU in Philadelphia, by which time WBZ had transitioned to an adult contemporary format. He was again the afternoon drive time disc jockey at WBZ from 1978 to 1981.

Bradley was the morning man at adult contemporary station WYNY-FM in New York City from 1981 to 1983. A format switch saw him moved to weekends, and he left the station in 1985.

After a few months of unemployment, Bradley was hired by the powerful KMOX-AM in St. Louis, a news and talk station, where he transitioned from music DJ to radio talk show host, initially sharing a show with Anne Keefe. Bradley also worked at KETC television (Channel 9), the St. Louis PBS station, but was fired immediately after making a racist remark on-air regarding the threat of young black males.

Bradley moved to WIBV-AM in 1992, leaving in 1993, and working at KTRS in St. Louis in 2000, in both cases as a talk show host.

Bradley, who had reportedly been suffering from emphysema, died on June 22, 2013, in suburban St. Louis.

Bradley has been inducted into the Massachusetts Broadcaster's Hall of Fame.
