= Jess Cain =

American radio personality (1926–2008)

Jess Daniel Dennis Cain II (June 17, 1926 – February 14, 2008) was an American radio personality.

== Career ==
For 34 years, from 1957 to 1991, Cain was the morning drivetime personality on WHDH/850 in Boston. Cain also was a professional actor and appeared in theater and musical theater productions, and appeared in early television on the Sergeant Bilko - a.k.a. The Phil Silvers Show. A native of Philadelphia, Pennsylvania, he was a graduate of Northeast Catholic High School in Philadelphia and the University of Notre Dame.

Cain's song about Carl Yastrzemski — which he adapted from an old ragtime tune called "Shoutin' Liza Trombone" — appeared on "The Impossible Dream," a WHDH-produced album commemorating the 1967 Boston Red Sox season and later as part of the soundtrack of the 2005 movie Fever Pitch.

He was a World War II veteran, serving under Audie Murphy at the Battle of the Bulge and earning the Silver Star.

In 1970, Cain criticized Johnny Cash's anti-war song "What is Truth?". He called the song "junk" and "Trash".

Cain died from prostate cancer in his Beacon Hill home at the age of 81. He was inducted into the National Radio Hall of Fame in November 2008.
