= Jordan Rich =

American radio personality

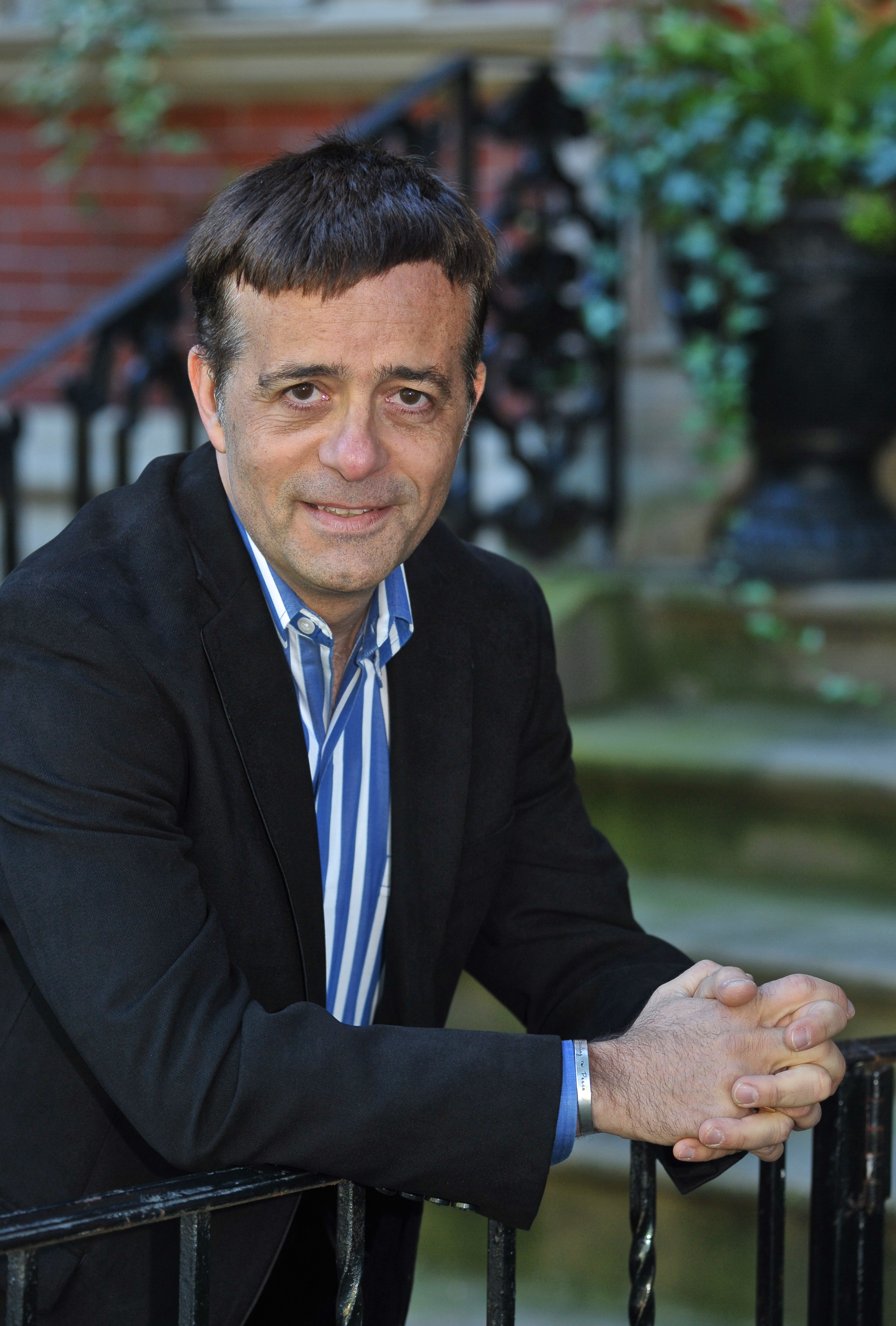
- Born: June 6, 1958 (age 68); Boston, Massachusetts
- Education: Curry College (B.A., Communications, 1980)
- Occupations: radio host, talk show host, voice-over artist
- Known for: Jordan Rich Show
- Spouses: Wendy Levine Rich (m. 1982; died 2013); Roberta Sydney (m. 2016)
- Children: Lindsay M. Rich (daughter); Andrew T. Rich (son)
- Parent(s): Martin Rich; Bernice Rich.

Jordan Rich is the host of The Jordan Rich Show on WBZ-AM 1030 in Boston, Massachusetts., a mix of history, arts, pop culture, and other topics. Parts of the shows are carried by WCCO (AM) in Minneapolis, Minnesota. He retired after the July 3, 2016 show in order to spend more time with his family. As of 2025, he still does segments for WBZ.

== Early life and education ==
Jordan Rich was born in Boston, Massachusetts and raised in Randolph, Massachusetts. He attended Curry College in Milton, Massachusetts graduating in 1980 with a degree in Communications.

== Career ==
Prior to coming to WBZ NewsRadio in October, 1996 and his tenure at WBZ he served as a fill-in host for WBZ NewsRadio long-time weekend overnight show host Norm Nathan who died in 1996.

Rich worked as a disc jockey and talk show host throughout the Boston area, including "morning drive host for WSSH-FM in Boston from 1982 to 1996. He also worked at WRKO-AM from 1978 to 1982, as a co-host of the morning show and a host of his own Broadway music program.". He is also co-owner of Chart Productions, an audio production company. His voice has been included in thousands of voice overs, including The Boston Pops, Sullivan Tire and KB Toys.

== Personal life ==
Jordan Rich resides in Framingham in the Greater Boston area. His wife of thirty one years, Wendy Levine Rich, a special needs high school teacher in Hudson, Massachusetts, had died in August 2013 of cancer. In 2016, he married Roberta Sydney.
