= WMEX (AM) =

Radio station in Quincy, Massachusetts (1934–2026)

- Quincy, Massachusetts; United States
- Broadcast area: Greater Boston
- Frequency: 1510 kHz

Ownership
- Owner: L&J Media, LLC

History
- First air date: October 18, 1934
- Former call signs: WMEX (1934–1978); WITS (1978–1983); WMRE (1983–1987); WSSH (1987–1989); WKKU (1989–1990); WSSH (1990–1995); WNRB (1995–2001); WSZE (2001); WWZN (2001–2012); WUFC (2012–2014)
- Former frequencies: 1500 kHz (1934–1940); 1470 kHz (1940–1941)

Technical information
- Facility ID: 12789
- Class: D
- Power: 10,000 watts (day); 2,000 watts (critical hours); 100 watts (night)
- Transmitter coordinates: 42°16′25.36″N 71°2′28.18″W
- Translator: 101.1 W266DQ (Weymouth)

WMEX (1510 AM) is a commercial radio station licensed to Quincy, Massachusetts, United States that is currently silent. Established in 1934, the station serves the Greater Boston market. Owned by L&J Media, headed by Tony LaGreca and Larry Justice, WMEX broadcast an oldies format as an affiliate of The True Oldies Channel prior to going silent in 2026. The station's studios were last located in Plymouth while the transmitter is sited in Quincy, near the Neponset River.

== History ==
=== Early years ===
WMEX was founded in 1934 by Bill and Al Pote, with studios in the Hotel Manger, and was originally on 1500 kHz, with 250 watts daytime, 100 watts nighttime. It broadcast from a transmitter site on Powder Horn Hill in Chelsea. On October 18, 1934, the station officially signed on the air. On April 5, 1936, WMEX moved its studio and offices to 70 Brookline Ave, where it remained for thirty years. In 1940, WMEX moved its transmitter to a site off West Squantum Road in Quincy, near the WNAC and WAAB site in the Neponset River Valley; it would remain there until 1981.

After several unsuccessful attempts to move to 1470 with a power upgrade to 5,000 watts, WMEX finally made the move (and power increase) in 1941, just in time for the North American Regional Broadcasting Agreement to move the station to 1510 kHz. Throughout this period, WMEX operated as an independent (non-network) station with a program schedule filled with such programs as live music remotes, horse racing, and ethnic programming.

One early WMEX star was future Fenway Park and Boston Garden organist John Kiley, who in 1941 broadcast three daily programs. One of them was titled Letter-Quest, on which listeners would write to Kiley in care of the station, requesting songs. The letter would be read by announcer Jay McMaster (who remained at WMEX into the Top 40 era), followed by Kiley playing the requested song.

In the 1940s, jazz critic Nat Hentoff got his start as a jazz deejay at WMEX. In the early 1950s, Nat Hentoff announced many live jazz radio broadcasts over WMEX from the Storyville nightclub at the Hotel Buckminster. Many audio recordings from these sessions are still available, including those by Billie Holiday, Dave Brubeck, John Coltrane, Ella Fitzgerald, Stan Getz, Charles Mingus, Charlie Parker, and Sarah Vaughan.

=== The Top 40 era ===
In 1957, the New England Radio Corporation sold WMEX to the Richmond brothers. One of the brothers, Max Richmond changed the format of WMEX to a rock-and-roll-dominant pop-music format (among the first in the nation) and hired popular disc jockey Arnie Ginsburg away from smaller station WBOS. The hit format lasted from 1957 until March 1975. Max Richmond was reportedly a challenge to work for, with his alleged micromanaging and abrasive personality, yet none can deny his uncanny ability to spot DJ talent, and to keep his station—despite a poor nighttime signal in many suburban locations—a major player and innovator for many years.

Among Max Richmond's innovations was the hiring of Jerry Williams in 1957 to conduct a nighttime telephone talk show, with the caller's voice heard on the air, a revolutionary concept in the late 1950s. With the weekday-only Williams show beginning at 10 pm (after much of the young rock-and-roll audience was in bed), Richmond was able to expand the appeal of his station to the adult community in the late-night hours. Malcolm X was a favorite guest of Williams, and many WMEX broadcasts featuring Williams and Malcolm X survive. Larry Glick (who was to become a Boston radio talk show legend) was hired by WMEX to host a show that aired after the Jerry Williams Show (1965–1967). Larry's show steered clear of controversy and was more focused on "having a good time" while taping into Boston's well-known humor side. When the Beatles broke in the United States, WMEX played virtually every Beatles song available and fueled the already rabid Boston fans. In the early 1960s, personality Arnie (WooWoo) Ginsburg hosted a Sunday night oldies show, one of the first in the nation to feature early pioneer rock and rhythm and blues recordings in a specialty show on a top-rated radio station.

In the late 1960s, WMEX received a power upgrade to 50,000 watts daytime, still with 5,000 watts at night. Station engineers had to constantly adjust the phasing network as tides in the Neponset River would play havoc with the station's directional pattern. However, the saltwater marsh area provided the station with an excellent coastal signal. While the night signal could not be heard clearly inland at many Boston suburban locations (especially in the growing and affluent western and southwestern suburbs), the station's nighttime transmissions were heard very clearly across the water to the Boston city neighborhoods and the working class North Shore areas. The saltwater path nighttime transmissions reached up to Nova Scotia and Labrador, gaining the station an audience in those areas, as well.

=== WITS: Information, talk and sports ===
By the late 1960s, WMEX was facing tough competition in the Top 40 format from WRKO, which featured a tight playlist, a more "suburban oriented" sound, and a 50,000 watt day and night signal which was heard clearly in all suburbs. However, under the programming of Dick Summer and later, John Garabedian, WMEX countered with an expanded playlist featuring some "progressive rock" album cuts. The station was one of the first two major market stations along with its sister, WPGC in Washington, DC, to pick up American Top 40 with Casey Kasem and broke "Maggie May" by Rod Stewart nationally. WMEX shot back up in the ratings and actually beat WRKO in a few demographics and time periods, but it was a temporary and final victory for the station.

In November 1971, owner Max Richmond died and FM radio began to overtake AM stations for music listening. WMEX decided to abandon Top 40 hits in 1975. It briefly ran a middle of the road music format with some talk programming. Then, WMEX captured the broadcast rights to Boston Red Sox baseball beginning with the 1975 playoffs. That led to WMEX becoming an all-talk station in 1976. In 1978, to better promote its talk format and sports coverage, the station changed call letters to WITS ("Information, Talk and Sports").

Adding the Boston Bruins hockey team in the 1978-79 season boosted WITS's sports profile, but the station came in for considerable criticism after the 1978 baseball season when it fired the popular Red Sox commentary duo of Ned Martin and Jim Woods. Although Martin was able to continue broadcasting the Red Sox on television, Woods never again broadcast the team's games on a regular basis.

Long a 5,000-watt station, WMEX/WITS in the 1970s had a daytime power boost to 50,000 watts, with nighttime power remaining at 5,000 watts, a less-than-perfect signal in parts of the Boston area, especially at night. WKBW (1520 AM), with 50,000 watts in Buffalo, New York, right next door to WMEX on the dial, all but buried the weaker 5,000-watt WMEX after dark in the western Boston suburbs (such as Wellesley). On the other side of WMEX was an equally strong signal from WTOP (1500 AM) in Washington, which, together with WKBW, put the squeeze on WMEX's signal at night. In 1981, WITS moved its transmitter to Waltham and was able to boost power to 50,000 watts day and night. While some areas did get an improved signal, others did not, especially at night. Not long afterward, WITS's owner at the time, Mariner Communications, suffered financial problems. The station lost the Red Sox and Bruins and had to abandon its talk format.

=== 1983–2017: Multiple formats ===
On January 1, 1983, WITS flipped to an adult standards format under the call sign WMRE "The Memory Station", but was not successful. Other formats quickly followed, one after another. Among them were a return to talk (featuring Morgan White Jr. and Bob Katzen) in September 1986, a flip to soft adult contemporary (as WSSH) in July 1987, a flip to country music (as WKKU) in February 1989, a return to soft adult contemporary (WSSH again) in November 1990, a flip to Spanish-language programming in March 1991, and as WNRB, changing to brokered religious programming in February 1995. On December 18, 1997, the station flipped to an all-sports format from One-On-One Sports.

In 2001, coinciding with One-On-One Sports's relaunch as Sporting News Radio, the call sign was changed first to WSZE, then to WWZN ("1510 The Zone"). During this time, Paul Allen's Rose City Broadcasting held the license. Allen also owned Sporting News Radio and The Sporting News magazine. The relaunched WWZN also acquired the local radio broadcasts of the Boston Celtics basketball team, but the station sold the broadcast rights to WRKO at the end of the 2004–2005 season. For a time, sports hosts such as Sean McDonough, Ryen Russillo, and Eddie Andelman were all heard on WWZN.

Prior to the station's sale, WWZN started to rely on time-brokered infomercials in addition to programming from Sporting News Radio. On May 31, 2007, Blackstrap Broadcasting completed its purchase of both this station and WSNR in the New York City area (licensed to Newark, New Jersey). In the fall of 2007, WWZN moved from Burlington, Massachusetts, to brand new studios overlooking the ocean at Marina Bay in Quincy.

WUFC's logo from 2012 to 2013 during its NBC Sports Radio affiliation

From 2008 until 2012, the station aired progressive talk shows as brokered time including a local show hosted by Jeff Santos. The station then changed its call letters to WUFC and returned to a sports format as an affiliate of NBC Sports Radio from 6 a.m. to 10 a.m. and 7 p.m. to 1 a.m. weekdays, with a local show, "The Bawstin Diehards", from 10 a.m. to Noon. Yahoo! Sports Radio (the successor to Sporting News Radio) aired at other times. The NBC Sports Radio affiliation lasted until late 2013, when Yahoo! took over NBC's hours. In June 2014, the station began airing a libertarian talk radio format. On November 17, 2014, the station reverted to its original call sign, WMEX. The change coincided with the move of The Howie Carr Show to the station from WRKO. Carr's show returned to WRKO on March 16, 2015.

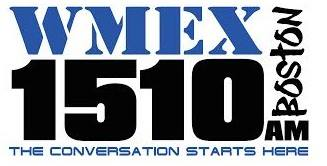
WMEX logo from November 17, 2014, to June 30, 2017

Programs on WMEX in early 2015 included Boston Herald Radio, The Glenn Beck Program, Michael Savage, The Sean Hannity Show, and Alex Jones. A Saturday-night oldies show debuted on March 28, 2015, hosted by Jim Callahan and Chris Porter, which was followed by Classic Rewind with Jimmy Jay. The program featured music from the classic WMEX rock-and-roll years, along with original station jingles from the era.

On June 2, 2015, WMEX shuffled its line-up. Renegade Radio moved to the mornings, followed by Emmy-winning journalist Joe Shortsleeve with The Shortsleeve Report, radio hall-of-famer and ex-Howie Carr producer Sandy Shack, and former WTKK and WRKO host Michele McPhee. Syndicated shows such as The Capitol Hill Show with Tim Constantine and Michael Savage rounded out the lineup. Premiere Networks, which syndicates Hannity and Beck, also offered The Rush Limbaugh Show to WMEX after the show's longtime Boston affiliate, WRKO, announced its plan to drop the show, WMEX openly refused to carry the show, which prompted Premiere parent company iHeartMedia to take Limbaugh (as well as Hannity and Beck) to a lower-powered, co-owned-and-operated station, WKOX.

On June 23, 2015, WMEX announced that Daly XXL Communications would be purchasing the station from Blackstrap for $175,000, pending Federal Communications Commission (FCC) approval, which was granted in September 2015. The sale was completed on September 10, 2015. On December 28, 2015, the station announced a new noontime show hosted by Nancy "Sandy" Shack, longtime producer of The Howie Carr Show, to begin on January 4, 2016. McPhee left the station on June 2, 2017, replaced by a live airing of the Michael Savage show.

=== WMEX goes silent ===
During June 2017, talk programming during the evening hours was replaced by local oldies music shows, but in the final days, rumors began circulating that the station would be going off the air on June 30, 2017. The lease on their transmitter site in Waltham was due to expire. On the June 29, 2017, edition of an evening music show hosted by Jimmy Jay, the station confirmed that it was going to leave the air at 6 p.m. the following evening. On June 30, 2017, the hosts of the Renegade Radio morning show did a special second broadcast from 3 p.m. to 6 p.m., pre-empting the syndicated Michael Savage show. The station then went silent. The Waltham towers were dismantled in May 2018.

In the interim, the station applied to the FCC for special temporary authority (STA) to remain silent until a new owner or funding was found. Based on its date of sign-off, it needed to return by June 30, 2018, in order to remain fully licensed under FCC regulations disallowing a station from remaining silent and licensed for more than 365 days.

=== WMEX returns to the air ===
On December 18, 2017, Ed Perry, owner of WATD-FM in Marshfield, announced that he would acquire WMEX for $125,000, with the intention of returning the station to the air with local news and sports for the area south of Boston. The paperwork was filed with the FCC in January 2018, the WMEX call letters were not initially included in the deal, but were eventually acquired. The FCC approved the license transfer to Ed Perry's Marshfield Broadcasting on March 9, 2018, the sale was completed on March 17.

On June 6, 2018, the station was approved to diplex its signal from the broadcast tower of WBIX (the former WNAC) just south of Boston (right down the street from the station's 1940–1981 transmitter site) to temporarily broadcast daytime only at a power of 1,000 watts. On June 15, 2018, WMEX applied to permanently diplex with WBIX, with a proposed daytime power of 10,000 watts and nighttime power of 100 watts, along with a city of license change to Quincy. WMEX commenced on-air testing on the weekend of June 30, 2018, simulcasting WATD-FM, to keep its license alive; it intended to resume regular broadcasting in the fall of 2018 with oldies and South Shore-based news and sports. On July 3, 2018, the station applied for an STA to increase its temporary daytime power to 2,000 watts and implement the 100-watt nighttime signal. WMEX went silent on November 10, 2018, after losing its Internet feed from WATD-FM; in addition, the station's transmitter was in the process of being moved to Brockton sister station WATD (1460 AM).

The station did testing and a simulcast of WATD-FM in mid-October 2019. Owner Ed Perry told the New England Radio Stations Facebook group that he intended to start original programming of South Shore-based news and sports as well as oldies by March 9, 2020. On that day, an update advised that the station was simulcasting WATD-FM, with plans to add its own programming and live internet streaming starting in April 2020. Due to the coronavirus epidemic, the date was pushed back to May 18, 2020. On that day just after 9 a.m., DJ Larry Justice–who did the popular morning show on WMEX in the mid-1960s–returned to the station, debuting with the first song "Joy to the World" by Three Dog Night. Marshfield Broadcasting sold WMEX to L&J Media, headed by Anthony LaGreca and midday host Larry Justice, for $390,000 in 2021.

On March 2, 2026, WMEX shifted its format from oldies of the 1960s and 1970s to classic hits of the 1970s and 1980s. The change coincided with a local marketing agreement with Tyler Nye's Local Media Boston ahead of a sale of the station for $1 and the assumption of L&J's debt; LaGreca would retain a 45% stake as a silent partner, while outgoing partner Justice's midday show was canceled. On March 13, Nye withdrew the transfer application; on March 17, L&J Media informed the FCC that it had itself changed its name to Local Media Boston.

In May 2026, the station announced that Scott Shannon, known for his work at WHTZ in New York City and other stations, would become its morning host; by June, WMEX had eliminated its local on-air staff to carry Shannon's The True Oldies Channel full time. This return to oldies ended on September 30, 2026, when WMEX again ceased operations. Local Media Boston attempted to surrender the WMEX license that October, but immediately withdrew the filing as erroneous and instead requested a silent STA citing financial reasons; on October 16, the company informed the FCC that the corporate name had been changed back to L&J Media.

== Translator ==
Broadcast translator for WMEX
Call sign	Frequency	City of license	FID	ERP (W)	Class	Transmitter coordinates	FCC info
W266DQ	101.1 FM	Weymouth, Massachusetts	202403	250	D	42°14′49.1″N 71°2′53.5″W	LMS

Preceded by 850 WHDH; 1947–1975	Radio Home of the Boston Red Sox; 1976–1982 (as WMEX/WITS)	Succeeded by 99.1 WPLM-FM/680 WRKO; 1983–1994
