= Jerry Williams (radio host) =

- Born: Gerald Jacoby; September 24, 1923; Brooklyn, New York
- Died: April 29, 2003 (aged 79); Boston, Massachusetts
- Occupation: Radio host
- Known for: Political and social commentary

Jerry Williams (September 24, 1923 – April 29, 2003) was an American radio host, one of the originators of the talk radio format.

His radio career spanned more than 50 years, starting in 1946 at WCYB in Bristol, Virginia (near the Tennessee border), followed by a stint at WIBG in Philadelphia. But it was at WMEX in Boston (1957–1965) where his popularity took off. He later went to WBBM in Chicago. In 1968, he returned to Boston on WBZ for eight years. In 1976 he was on WMCA in New York, then back to Philadelphia on WWDB, where he became the first FM radio talk host. He came back to Boston once again in 1981, on WRKO, where he was promoted as "the man you love to hate," and where he remained until 1998. From 2002 to 2003, he hosted a program on WROL while fighting a series of illnesses.

He also hosted television talk shows on WBZ-TV (1968–1969), WFXT (1987–1990), and WHLL (1990).

Jerry Williams was influential in the movement to remove Nixon from office of president. Williams was described as a liberal and a populist. He was a critic of the state and federal liberal political establishment and media. Williams carried out frequent radio crusades, including ones to repeal Massachusetts' mandatory seat belt law and against a proposed prison in New Braintree, Massachusetts. He was a critic of Governor Michael Dukakis. A Christmas tradition on his radio program was a reading of Dylan Thomas' A Child's Christmas in Wales. He traditionally signed off with "Good Night, Good Luck, Good Morning, Good Night, Tee". Tee was his wife Therese.

Williams founded the National Association of Radio Talk Show Hosts. He was inducted into the National Radio Hall of Fame in 1996. Howie Carr cited him as an influence.

Williams died on April 29, 2003, in Boston.

In 2008, Burning Up The Air, a biography by former producers Steve Elman and Alan Tolz, was published by Commonwealth Editions (acquired by Applewood Books in 2010).
