= List of Boston Bruins broadcasters =

This is a list of Boston Bruins broadcasters.

== Television ==
=== 2020s ===
Year	Channel	Play-by-play	Color commentator(s)	Ice level reporter(s)	Studio host	Studio analyst(s)
2026–27	NESN	Judd Sirott	Andy Brickley	Adam Pellerin (primary); Andrew Raycroft (select games)	Sophia Jurksztowicz; Adam Pellerin (select games)	Billy Jaffe, Andrew Raycroft, and P. J. Stock
2025–26	NESN	Judd Sirott	Andy Brickley	Adam Pellerin (primary); Andrew Raycroft (select games)	Sophia Jurksztowicz; Adam Pellerin (select games)	Billy Jaffe, Andrew Raycroft, and P. J. Stock
2024–25	NESN	Judd Sirott	Andy Brickley	Andrew Raycroft; Adam Pellerin; Billy Jaffe (select games)	Dale Arnold; Adam Pellerin (select games)	Barry Pederson, Billy Jaffe, Andrew Raycroft, Gigi Marvin, and Brian Boyle
2023–24	NESN	Jack Edwards (primary); Alex Faust (select games)	Andy Brickley	Sophia Jurksztowicz (primary); Andrew Raycroft (select games); Adam Pellerin (select games)	Sophia Jurksztowicz	Barry Pederson, Billy Jaffe, and Andrew Raycroft
2022–23	NESN	Jack Edwards	Andy Brickley	Sophia Jurksztowicz (primary); Andrew Raycroft (when Jurksztowicz is studio host)	Dale Arnold (primary); Sophia Jurksztowicz (when Arnold is off)	Barry Pederson, Billy Jaffe, and Andrew Raycroft
2021–22	NESN	Jack Edwards	Andy Brickley	Sophia Jurksztowicz (primary); Andrew Raycroft (when Jurksztowicz is studio host)	Dale Arnold (primary); Sophia Jurksztowicz (when Arnold is off)	Barry Pederson, Billy Jaffe, Andrew Raycroft, and Andrew Alberts
2021	NESN	Jack Edwards	Andy Brickley	Sophia Jurksztowicz	Dale Arnold	Barry Pederson, Billy Jaffe, Andrew Raycroft, and Andrew Alberts

=== 2010s ===
Year	Channel	Play-by-play	Color commentator(s)	Ice level reporter(s)	Studio host	Studio analyst(s)
2019–20	NESN	Jack Edwards	Andy Brickley	Sophia Jurksztowicz	Dale Arnold	Barry Pederson, Billy Jaffe, Andrew Raycroft, and Andrew Alberts
2018–19	NESN	Jack Edwards	Andy Brickley	Alex Kraemer	Dale Arnold	Barry Pederson, Billy Jaffe, Andrew Raycroft, and Andrew Alberts
2017–18	NESN	Jack Edwards	Andy Brickley	Alex Kraemer	Dale Arnold	Barry Pederson, Billy Jaffe, Andrew Raycroft, and Andrew Alberts
2016–17	NESN	Jack Edwards	Andy Brickley	Sarah Davis	Dale Arnold	Barry Pederson, Gord Kluzak, and/or Billy Jaffe
2015–16	NESN	Jack Edwards	Andy Brickley	Sarah Davis	Dale Arnold	Barry Pederson, Gord Kluzak, and/or Billy Jaffe
2014–15	NESN	Jack Edwards	Andy Brickley	Guerin Austin	Dale Arnold	Barry Pederson, Gord Kluzak, and/or Billy Jaffe
2013–14	NESN	Jack Edwards	Andy Brickley	Jamie Erdahl	Dale Arnold	Barry Pederson, Gord Kluzak, and/or Billy Jaffe
2013	NESN	Jack Edwards	Andy Brickley	Naoko Funayama	Dale Arnold	Barry Pederson, Gord Kluzak, and/or Billy Jaffe
2011–12	NESN	Jack Edwards	Andy Brickley	Naoko Funayama	Dale Arnold	Barry Pederson, Gord Kluzak, Billy Jaffe, and/or Mark Mowers
2010–11	NESN	Jack Edwards	Andy Brickley	Naoko Funayama	Kathryn Tappen	Barry Pederson, Gord Kluzak, or Mike Milbury

=== 2000s ===
Year	Channel	Play-by-play	Color commentator(s)	Ice level reporter(s)	Studio host	Studio analyst(s)
2009–10	NESN	Jack Edwards	Andy Brickley	Naoko Funayama	Kathryn Tappen	Barry Pederson, Gord Kluzak, or Mike Milbury
2008–09	NESN	Jack Edwards	Andy Brickley	Naoko Funayama	Kathryn Tappen	Barry Pederson, Gord Kluzak, or Mike Milbury
2007–08	NESN	Jack Edwards	Andy Brickley	Rob Simpson	Kathryn Tappen	Rick Middleton, Barry Pederson, Gord Kluzak, or Mike Milbury
2006–07	NESN	Dale Arnold (home); Jack Edwards (road)	Andy Brickley	Rob Simpson	Eric Frede	Rick Middleton, Barry Pederson, Gord Kluzak, or Tom Fitzgerald
2005–06	NESN	Dale Arnold (home); Jack Edwards (road)	Andy Brickley	Rob Simpson	Eric Frede	Rick Middleton, Barry Pederson, Gord Kluzak, Don Sweeney, and Tom Fitzgerald
2003–04	NESN	Dale Arnold (home); Dave Shea (road)	Gord Kluzak (home); Andy Brickley (road)	Corey Masse (Playoffs)	Tom Caron	Cam Neely, Rick Middleton, Barry Pederson, and Paul Stewart
2002–03	NESN	Dale Arnold (home); Dave Shea (road)	Gord Kluzak (home); Andy Brickley (road)	—N/a	Tom Caron	Rick Middleton, Barry Pederson, and Cam Neely
2001–02	NESN	Dale Arnold (home); Dave Shea (road)	Gord Kluzak (home); Andy Brickley and Gerry Cheevers (road)	—N/a	Tom Caron	
2001–02	WSBK-TV	Dale Arnold (home); Dave Shea (road)	Gord Kluzak (home); Andy Brickley and Gerry Cheevers (road)	—N/a	Tom Caron	
2000–01	NESN	Dale Arnold (home); Dave Shea (road)	Gord Kluzak (home); Andy Brickley and Gerry Cheevers (road)	—N/a	Tom Caron	
2000–01	WSBK-TV	Dale Arnold (home); Dave Shea (road)	Gord Kluzak (home); Andy Brickley and Gerry Cheevers (road)	—N/a	Tom Caron	

=== 1990s ===
Year	Channel	Play-by-play	Color commentator(s)	Ice level reporter(s)	Studio host	Studio analyst(s)
1999–2000	NESN	Dale Arnold	Gord Kluzak	—N/a	Tom Caron	
1999–2000	WSBK-TV	Dave Shea	Phil Esposito and Gerry Cheevers	—N/a	Tom Caron	
1998–99	NESN	Dale Arnold	Gord Kluzak	—N/a	Tom Caron	
1998–99	WSBK-TV	Dave Shea	Andy Brickley	—N/a	Tom Caron	
1997–98	NESN	Dale Arnold	Gord Kluzak	Brenda Brenon	Tom Caron	
1997–98	WSBK-TV	Dave Shea	Andy Brickley		Tom Caron	
1996–97	NESN	Dale Arnold	Gord Kluzak	Brenda Brenon	Dawn Mitchell	
1996–97	WSBK-TV	Fred Cusick	Derek Sanderson			
1995–96	NESN	Dale Arnold	Gord Kluzak	Brenda Brenon	Dawn Mitchell	
1995–96	WSBK-TV	Fred Cusick	Derek Sanderson			
1995	NESN	Fred Cusick	Derek Sanderson and Dave Shea	Kim Walden and Dave Shea	Tom Larson and Kim Walden	
1995	WSBK-TV	Fred Cusick	Derek Sanderson	—N/a	Doug Brown	Johnny Peirson
1993–94	NESN	Fred Cusick	Derek Sanderson and Dave Shea	Amy Stone and Dave Shea	Tom Larson and Amy Stone	
1993–94	WSBK-TV	Fred Cusick	Derek Sanderson	—N/a	Bob Halloran	Johnny Peirson
1992–93	NESN	Fred Cusick	Derek Sanderson and Dave Shea	Dave Shea	Tom Larson	
1992–93	WSBK-TV	Fred Cusick	Derek Sanderson	—N/a	Gene Lavanchy	Johnny Peirson
1991–92	NESN	Fred Cusick	Derek Sanderson and Dave Shea	Dave Shea	Tom Larson	
1991–92	WSBK-TV	Fred Cusick	Derek Sanderson	—N/a	Gene Lavanchy	Johnny Peirson
1990–91	NESN	Fred Cusick	Derek Sanderson and Dave Shea	Dave Shea	Tom Larson	
1990–91	WSBK-TV	Fred Cusick	Derek Sanderson	—N/a	Gene Lavanchy	Johnny Peirson

=== 1980s ===
Year	Channel	Play-by-play	Color commentator(s)	Ice level reporter(s)	Studio host	Studio analyst(s)
1989–90	NESN	Fred Cusick	Derek Sanderson and Dave Shea	Dave Shea	Tom Larson	
1989–90	WSBK-TV	Fred Cusick	Derek Sanderson	—N/a	Gene Lavanchy	Johnny Peirson and Terry O'Reilly
1988–89	NESN	Fred Cusick	Derek Sanderson and Dave Shea	Dave Shea	Tom Larson	
1988–89	WSBK-TV	Fred Cusick	Derek Sanderson	—N/a	Sean McDonough and Walt Perkins	Johnny Peirson
1987–88	NESN	Fred Cusick	Derek Sanderson and Dave Shea	Dave Shea	Tom Larson	
1987–88	WSBK-TV	Fred Cusick	Derek Sanderson	—N/a	Sean McDonough and Walt Perkins	Johnny Peirson
1986–87	NESN	Fred Cusick	Dave Shea & Terry O'Reilly or Derek Sanderson	Dave Shea	Tom Larson	
1986–87	WSBK-TV	Fred Cusick (1st and 3rd periods); Dave Shea (2nd period)	Dave Shea (1st and 3rd periods); Fred Cusick (2nd period)	—N/a	Sean McDonough	Johnny Peirson
1985–86	NESN	Fred Cusick (1st and 3rd periods); Dave Shea (2nd period)	Dave Shea (1st and 3rd periods); Fred Cusick (2nd period)	Dave Shea		
1985–86	WSBK-TV	Fred Cusick (1st and 3rd periods); Dave Shea (2nd period)	Dave Shea (1st and 3rd periods); Fred Cusick (2nd period)	—N/a	Sean McDonough	Johnny Peirson
1984–85	NESN	Fred Cusick	Johnny Peirson			
1984–85	WSBK-TV	Fred Cusick	Johnny Peirson	—N/a	Tom Larson	
1983–84	NESN	Fred Cusick	Johnny Peirson			
1983–84	WSBK-TV	Fred Cusick	Johnny Peirson	—N/a	Tom Larson	
1982–83	WSBK-TV	Fred Cusick	Johnny Peirson	—N/a	Tom Larson	
1981–82	WSBK-TV	Fred Cusick	Johnny Peirson	—N/a	Tom Larson	
1980–81	WSBK-TV	Fred Cusick	Johnny Peirson	—N/a	Tom Larson	

=== 1970s ===
Year	Channel	Play-by-play	Color commentator(s)	Studio host
1979–80	WSBK-TV	Fred Cusick	Johnny Peirson	Tom Larson
1978–79	WSBK-TV	Fred Cusick	Johnny Peirson	Tom Larson
1977–78	WSBK-TV	Fred Cusick	Johnny Peirson	Tom Larson
1976–77	WSBK-TV	Fred Cusick	Johnny Peirson	Tom Larson
1975–76	WSBK-TV	Fred Cusick	Johnny Peirson	Tom Larson
1974–75	WSBK-TV	Fred Cusick	Johnny Peirson	Tom Larson
1973–74	WSBK-TV	Fred Cusick	Johnny Peirson	Tom Larson
1972–73	WSBK-TV	Fred Cusick	Johnny Peirson	Tom Larson
1971–72	WSBK-TV	Fred Cusick	Johnny Peirson	Tom Larson
1970–71	WSBK-TV	Don Earle	Johnny Peirson	Tom Larson

=== 1960s ===
Year	Channel	Play-by-play	Color commentator(s)	Studio host(s)
1969–70	WSBK-TV	Don Earle	Various Analysts (including Bill Cleary and Johnny Peirson)	Tom Larson
1968–69	WSBK-TV	Don Earle	Pat Egan	
1967–68	WSBK-TV	Don Earle		
1966–67	WKBG-TV	Fred Cusick		
1965–66	WHDH-TV	Fred Cusick		
1964–65	WHDH-TV	Fred Cusick		
1963–64	WMUR-TV	Fred Cusick		

=== 1940s ===
Year	Channel	Play-by-play	Color commentator(s)
1949–50	WBZ-TV	Frank Ryan	Bump Hadley
1948–49	WBZ-TV	Frank Ryan	

== Radio ==
=== 2020s ===
Year	Flagship Station	Play-by-play	Color commentator(s)
2024–25	WBZ-FM	Ryan Johnston	Bob Beers
2023–24	WBZ-FM	Judd Sirott	Bob Beers
2022–23	WBZ-FM	Judd Sirott	Bob Beers
2021–22	WBZ-FM	Judd Sirott	Bob Beers
2021	WBZ-FM	Judd Sirott	Bob Beers

=== 2010s ===
Year	Flagship Station	Play-by-play	Color commentator(s)
2019–20	WBZ-FM	Judd Sirott	Bob Beers
2018–19	WBZ-FM	Judd Sirott	Bob Beers
2017–18	WBZ-FM	Judd Sirott	Bob Beers
2016–17	WBZ-FM	Dave Goucher	Bob Beers
2015–16	WBZ-FM	Dave Goucher	Bob Beers
2014–15	WBZ-FM	Dave Goucher	Bob Beers
2013–14	WBZ-FM	Dave Goucher	Bob Beers
2013	WBZ-FM	Dave Goucher	Bob Beers
2011–12	WBZ-FM	Dave Goucher	Bob Beers
2010–11	WBZ-FM	Dave Goucher	Bob Beers

=== 2000s ===
Year	Flagship Station	Play-by-play	Color commentator(s)	Ice level reporter	Studio host
2009–10	WBZ-FM	Dave Goucher	Bob Beers		
2008–09	WBZ	Dave Goucher	Bob Beers	Tom Cuddy	Alan Segel
2007–08	WBZ	Dave Goucher	Bob Beers	Tom Cuddy	Alan Segel
2006–07	WBZ	Dave Goucher	Bob Beers	Tom Cuddy	Alan Segel
2005–06	WBZ	Dave Goucher	Bob Beers	Tom Cuddy	Alan Segel
2003–04	WBZ	Dave Goucher	Bob Beers	Tom Cuddy	Alan Segel
2002–03	WBZ	Dave Goucher	Bob Beers	—N/a	Alan Segel
2001–02	WBZ	Dave Goucher	Bob Beers	—N/a	Alan Segel
2000–01	WBZ	Dave Goucher	Bob Beers	—N/a	Alan Segel

=== 1990s ===
Year	Flagship Station	Play-by-play	Color commentator(s)	Ice level reporter	Studio host
1999–2000	WBZ	Bob Neumeier	Bob Beers	—N/a	Dan Roche
1998–99	WBZ	Bob Neumeier	Bob Beers	—N/a	Dan Roche
1997–98	WBZ	Bob Neumeier	Bob Beers	—N/a	Dan Roche
1996–97	WBZ	Bob Neumeier	Andy Brickley	—N/a	Dan Roche
1995–96	WBZ	Bob Neumeier	Barry Pederson	—N/a	Dan Roche
1995	WBNW	Bob Wilson (Before lockout); Dale Arnold (After lockout)	Johnny Bucyk		
1993–94	WEEI	Bob Wilson	Johnny Bucyk	Craig Mustard	
1992–93	WEEI	Bob Wilson	Johnny Bucyk	Craig Mustard	
1991–92	WEEI	Bob Wilson	Johnny Bucyk	Craig Mustard	
1990–91	WEEI	Bob Wilson	Johnny Bucyk	Craig Mustard	

=== 1980s ===
Year	Flagship Station	Play-by-play	Color commentator(s)	Ice level reporter
1989–90	WPLM	Bob Wilson	Johnny Bucyk	
1988–89	WPLM	Bob Wilson	Johnny Bucyk	
1987–88	WPLM	Bob Wilson	Johnny Bucyk	
1986–87	WPLM	Bob Wilson	Johnny Bucyk	
1985–86	WPLM	Bob Wilson	Johnny Bucyk	
1984–85	WPLM	Bob Wilson	Johnny Bucyk	
1983–84	WPLM	Bob Wilson	Johnny Bucyk	
1982–83	WPLM	Bob Wilson	Johnny Bucyk	
1981–82	WPLM	Bob Wilson	Johnny Bucyk	
1980–81	WITS	Bob Wilson	Johnny Bucyk	

=== 1970s ===
Year	Flagship Station	Play-by-play	Color commentator(s)
1979–80	WITS	Bob Wilson	Glenn Ordway
1978–79	WITS	Bob Wilson	Glenn Ordway
1977–78	WBZ	Bob Wilson	Bob Lobel (home games)
1976–77	WBZ	Bob Wilson	
1975–76	WBZ	Bob Wilson	Brad Park (during injury)
1974–75	WBZ	Bob Wilson	
1973–74	WBZ	Bob Wilson	Ron Cantera
1972–73	WBZ	Bob Wilson	Ron Cantera
1971–72	WBZ	Bob Wilson	Ron Cantera
1970–71	WBZ	Fred Cusick	Cal Gardner

=== 1960s ===
Year	Flagship Station	Play-by-play	Color commentator(s)
1969–70	WBZ	Fred Cusick	Johnny Peirson (regular-season and playoff games on network TV)
1968–69	WHDH	Bob Wilson	Johnny Peirson
1967–68	WHDH	Bob Wilson	
1966–67	WHDH	Jim Laing	Bob Wilson
1965–66	WHDH	Fred Cusick	Bob Wilson
1964–65	WHDH	Bill Harrington	Bob Wilson
1963–64	WHDH	Bill Harrington	
1962–63	WHDH	Bill Harrington	
1961–62	WHDH	Bill Harrington	Johnny Peirson
1960–61	WHDH	Fred Cusick	John Bassett

=== 1950s ===
Year	Flagship Station	Play-by-play	Color commentator(s)
1959–60	WHDH	Fred Cusick	
1958–59	WHDH	Fred Cusick	
1957–58	WHDH	Fred Cusick	
1956–57	WHDH	Fred Cusick	
1955–56	WHDH	Fred Cusick	
1954–55	WHDH	Fred Cusick	
1953–54	WHDH	Fred Cusick	Jack Crawford
1952–53	WHDH	Fred Cusick	Jack Crawford
1951–52	WHDH	Frank Ryan and/or Leo Egan	
1950–51	WHDH	Frank Ryan and/or Leo Egan	

=== 1940s ===
Year	Flagship Station	Play-by-play	Color commentator(s)
1949–50	WHDH	Frank Ryan and/or Leo Egan	
1948–49	WHDH	Frank Ryan and/or Leo Egan	Jack Crawford (Playoffs)
1947–48	WHDH	Frank Ryan and/or Leo Egan	
1946–47	WHDH	Frank Ryan and/or Leo Egan	
1945–46	WNAC	Frank Ryan	
1944–45	WNAC	Frank Ryan	
1943–44	WNAC	Frank Ryan	
1942–43	WNAC	Frank Ryan	
1941–42	WAAB	Frank Ryan	
1940–41	WAAB	Frank Ryan	

=== 1930s ===
Year	Flagship Station	Play-by-play
1939–40	WAAB	Frank Ryan
1938–39	WAAB	Frank Ryan
1937–38	WAAB	Frank Ryan
1936–37	WAAB	Frank Ryan
1935–36	WAAB	Frank Ryan
1934–35	WNAC	Frank Ryan
1933–34	WNAC	Frank Ryan
1932–33	WNAC	Frank Ryan
1931–32	WBZ	Frank Ryan
1930–31	WBZ	Frank Ryan

=== 1920s ===
Year	Flagship Station	Play-by-play
1929–30	WBZ	Frank Ryan
1928–29	WBZ	Frank Ryan
1927–28	WBZ	Frank Ryan
1926–27	WBZ	Frank Ryan
1925–26	WBZ	Frank Ryan
1924–25	WBZ	Frank Ryan

== Newspaper ==
- Russ Conway, The Eagle-Tribune
- Francis Rosa, The Boston Globe

== See also ==
- List of current National Hockey League broadcasters
- List of Boston Red Sox broadcasters
- List of Boston Celtics broadcasters
- List of New England Patriots broadcasters

== Notes ==
- The 2004–05 season was canceled due to a lockout. If there were games in 2004, Dale Arnold & Gord Kluzak would have done home games, and Dave Shea & Andy Brickley would have done road games. Tom Caron would have been the studio host and Cam Neely, Barry Pederson, Rick Middleton, & Paul Stewart would have been studio analysts. All games would have been on NESN. On radio, WBZ would have been the Bruins' flagship station. Dave Goucher and Bob Beers would have called the games, Alan Segel would have been the studio host, and Tom Cuddy would have been the ice level reporter.
- Terry O'Reilly left the broadcast booth during the 1986–87 season to become Bruins head coach.
- When Bob Neumeier missed games due to commitments with NBC Sports and WBZ-TV, Alan Segel served as the play-by-play announcer.
- On December 31, 2008, WBZ let go Tom Cuddy.
- Dale Arnold replaced Bob Wilson as Bruins radio announcer following the 1994–95 NHL lockout; Wilson having decided to retire during the lockout. However, he did return to share play-by-play duties with Neumeier for the final game at the old Boston Garden (a pre-season exhibition game against the Montreal Canadiens) and the first game at the new Fleet Center (later the TD Garden) against the New York Islanders.
- In 1965, Johnny Most served as a color commentator for one Boston Bruins game when play-by-play announcer Fred Cusick was sick and color commentator Bob Wilson filled in on play-by-play.
