= Andy Brickley =

American ice hockey player and color commentator

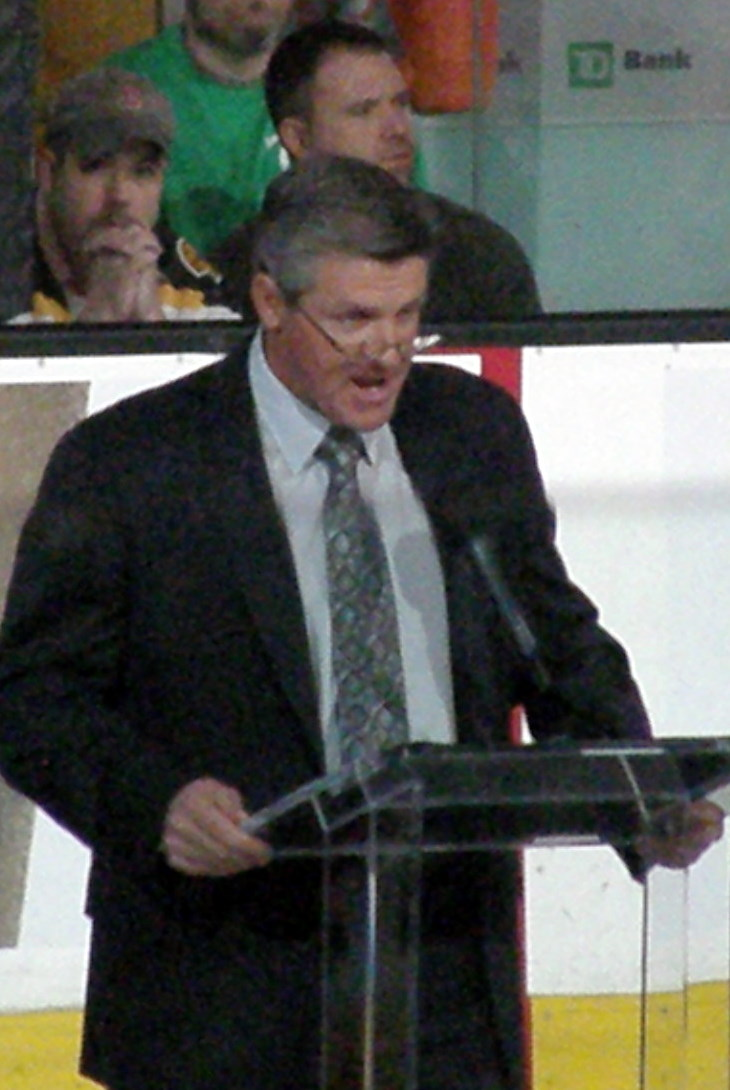
- Born: August 9, 1961 (age 65) Melrose, Massachusetts, U.S.
- Height: 5 ft 11 in (180 cm)
- Weight: 200 lb (91 kg; 14 st 4 lb)
- Position: Left wing
- Shot: Left
- Played for: Philadelphia Flyers; Pittsburgh Penguins; New Jersey Devils; Boston Bruins; Winnipeg Jets
- National team: United States
- NHL draft: 210th overall, 1980; Philadelphia Flyers
- Playing career: 1982–2000

Andrew Brickley (born August 9, 1961) is an American former professional hockey player, who spent 14 seasons playing in the National Hockey League, American Hockey League, and the International Hockey League. He currently serves as the color commentator for the Boston Bruins on the New England Sports Network.

== Playing career ==
=== Amateur ===
As a youth, Brickley played in the 1974 Quebec International Pee-Wee Hockey Tournament with a minor ice hockey team from Melrose, Massachusetts and was selected as a Middlesex League All-Star. Brickley also excelled in baseball, during his time at Melrose High School, serving as a captain his senior year and was selected to the Division 1 North All-Star team.

Brickley was originally accepted into both Trinity and Middlebury Colleges -- where his father wanted him to go. Brickley, however, had ambitions to play Division I hockey. He made the decision to attend the University of New Hampshire, where he successfully made the team as a walk-on. Brickley played for the UNH Wildcats from 1979 to 1982 and became one of their top players, notching 68 goals to go with 69 assists in 93 games. He led the Wildcats to the NCAA Final Four in 1982 and was named first team NCAA All-American the same year. Brickley also played for the U.S. National Junior Team in 1981.

Just as he had been in high school, Brickley was a dual-sport athlete in college and played for the UNH Baseball team, eventually being selected as a first team NCAA All-American in 1982. Even after beginning his professional hockey career, Brickley continued to play baseball in a semi-professional summer league throughout his first eight years in the NHL. Brickley was a key player for Augustine A’s, and helped them win five championships in seven years. He played one year for the Melrose Rams in 1986, before retiring from the sport.

=== Professional ===
Brickley was drafted by the Philadelphia Flyers with the last overall pick in the 1980 NHL entry draft, eventually becoming the second player (after Gerry Meehan) to play in the NHL after being drafted last overall. Brickley made his first apperearance with the Flyers during the 1982–83 season.

In October 1983, the Flyers traded Brickley to the Pittsburgh Penguins along with Ron Flockhart, Mark Taylor, and two 1984 draft picks, in exchange for Rich Sutter and two 1984 draft picks. Brickley played a total of 95 games for the Penguins over two seasons, totaling 25 goals and 35 assists. He was briefly demoted to the Baltimore Skipjacks of the American Hockey League (AHL) after he was caught breaking curfew with teammate Mike Bullard in Montreal.

The New Jersey Devils acquired Brickley in 1985 and sent him to the Maine Mariners for the 1985–86 season. During 60 games with the Mariners, he collected 26 goals and 34 assists, giving him the fourth-most points on the team. He made his debut with the Devils in 1986 and appeared in a total of 96 games in two seasons, collecting 19 goals and 26 assists. In 1987, he took a puck off his face in a game in Chicago, losing five teeth and getting 30 stitches. Brickley was placed on waivers following the 1987–88 NHL season and left unprotected by the Devils in the 1988 NHL Waiver Draft, though the team demoted him to the Utica Devils in an effort to "hide" him and hold onto him for an additional season. The Boston Bruins picked Brickley up in the waiver draft.

Brickley played in 71 games with the Bruins in the 1988–89 NHL season, garnering 13 goals and 22 assists. In addition to his natural position at left wing, he played center and right wing frequently, filling in any position needed by Bruins coach Terry O'Reilly, a trend that continued the following season under Mike Milbury. On December 5, 1988, Brickley took another puck off his face, this time receiving credit for a goal after a Ray Bourque slapshot bounced off his face and into the goal. The injury required five stitches.

Brickley was on his way to the best season of his career in 1989–90 before being struck down by injuries. He scored his first goal of the season on October 26, 1989, against the Quebec Nordiques. On November 18, he collected his first career hat trick against the Devils, his former team. Brickley said of the occasion, "Whenever I can score against New Jersey, it is that much sweeter...I wanted to show them they made a mistake." Just days later, Brickley suffered an injury that severely hindered his ability to walk. In January, he pulled a muscle in his thigh and missed a week's worth of games. Forty-three games into the season, after totalling a career-high 40 points, Brickley was sidelined yet again when doctors discovered that a muscle in his right leg was calcifying, a condition known as myositis ossificans (a condition which would later afflict Brickey's teammate Cam Neely). Despite the injury and extended time out of action, Brickley played briefly in Game 3 of the Stanley Cup Final.

Brickley had leg surgery on July 17, 1990 and missed all of training camp. The Bruins placed Brickley on waivers that December after he struggled to return to form. Brickley reported to the Maine Mariners, now Boston's affiliate, after going unclaimed. He expressed a desire to remain with the Bruins organization, mixed with uncertainty: "They say they're concerned about my game shape. Well, if they're concerned about that, why not send me down for the two-week conditioning period? Instead, they put me on irrevocable waivers. It really makes me wonder what my future is in the Bruins organization." Brickley went on a tear with the Mariners, collecting 25 points in 17 games and earning a brief recall to Boston, finishing the season with 2 goals and 9 assists in 40 NHL games, before injuring his shoulder in February.

Brickley began the 1991–92 season in Maine, having been cut from training camp in September. He did well with the Mariners and was named team captain before rejoining the Bruins in October. He proved his value after being recalled, with 19 points in his first 11 games, including converting on 8 goals on 15 shots during that span. He then suffered a shoulder injury during a game against the Hartford Whalers in November, which turned out to be a torn rotator cuff requiring surgery. He remained sidelined until February, first appearing in a charity skills competition with his teammates (and winning the shooting accuracy contest) and then returning to the lineup in mid-February against the St. Louis Blues. Still struggling late in the season, the Bruins eventually returned Brickley and other veterans to Maine, favoring youth over experience, and eventually cutting ties with them all after the season ended. Even though during his time with the Bruins he faced multiple nagging injuries, Brickley nonetheless became a fan favorite due to his hard work and resilience.

After being released by Boston, Brickley signed a two-way contract with the Winnipeg Jets, and began the season with the AHL's Moncton Hawks. After just three weeks in the AHL, the Jets recalled Brickley for an eleven-game stretch in which he scored two points. Brickley played one more regular season game for the Jets, plus one playoff game in which he collected a goal and an assist. While playing for the Hawks that season, however, Brickley collected 15 goals and 36 assists in 38 games. Brickley appeared in just two games for Winnipeg the following season, but continued to have success in the AHL. He played in barely more than half of the Hawks' first 56 games while recovering from another rotator cuff injury, but following his brief two-game callup with the Jets, he led the league in shooting at 26.7 percent and collected four assists in a single game against Fredericton the night after scoring the game-tying goal with four seconds remaining in regulation.

For the 1994–95 NHL season, Brickley joined the New York Islanders, but never appeared in a game for them. Instead, he was assigned to the International Hockey League's Denver Grizzlies, missing the first month and a half of the season with knee trouble. He returned to score 50 points in 58 games with the Grizzlies and led them to the Turner Cup for the first of two consecutive seasons with 30 points in 16 playoff games. He played his final game with the Grizzlies in 1996 before retiring.

Years later, Brickley said of his career, "My story is a good one. I was always a B team player growing up, a walk-on through college and I finally got an opportunity because I stayed with it. I was the NHL's version of Mr. Irrelevant and I happily played 13 years." Following his retirement Brickley has played in numerous charity games for Boston Bruins Alumni Hockey Team.

== Broadcasting career ==
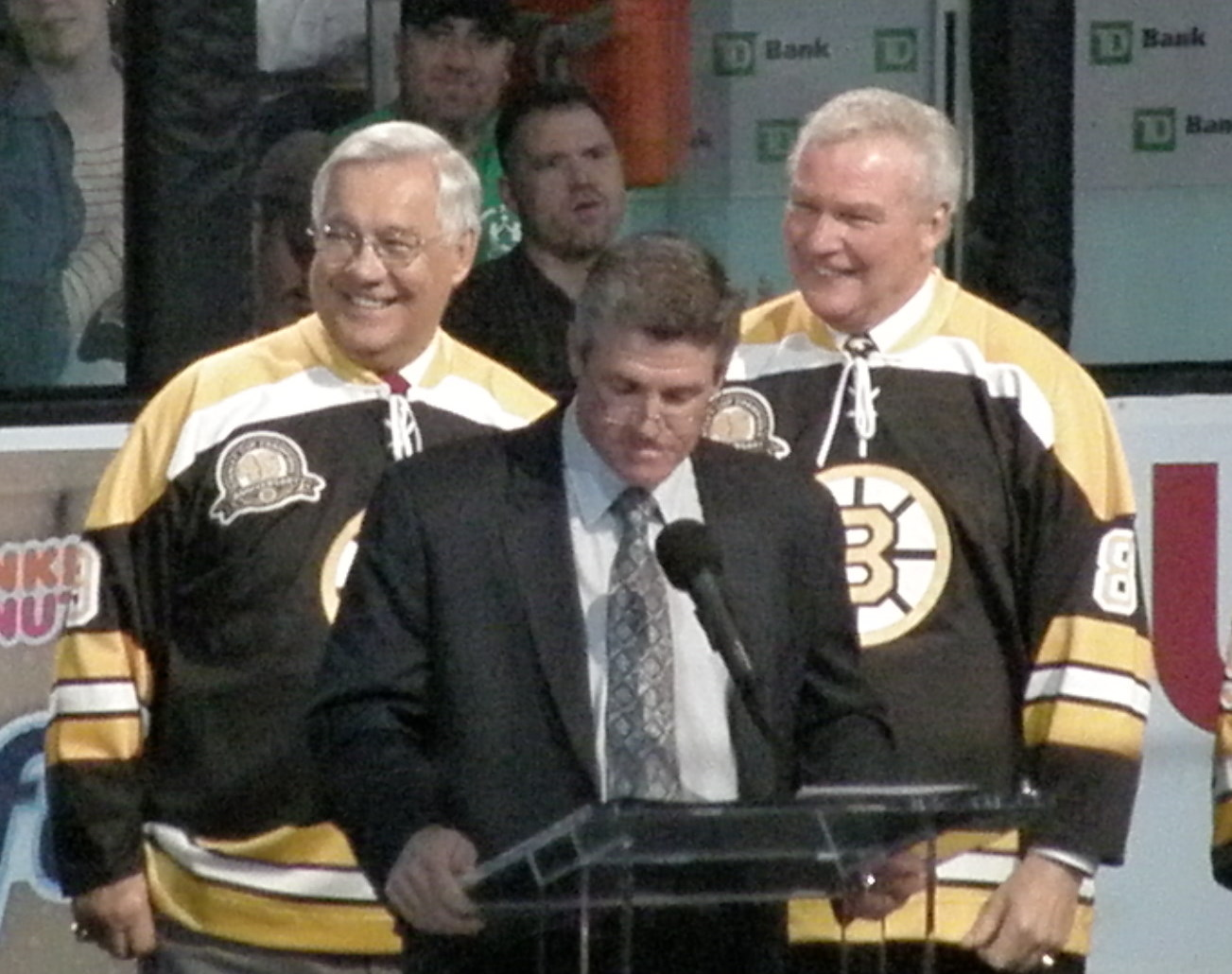
Brickley with Johnny Bucyk and Ken Hodge Sr. in 2010

Brickley's first experience as a broadcaster came when he was with the Grizzlies, participating in broadcasts while he was injured.

WBZ Radio hired Brickley in 1996 to replace Barry Pederson as the color commentator on Bruins radio broadcasts. In 1997, UPN 38 selected Brickley as Derek Sanderson's replacement on Bruins television broadcasts. He joined NESN while staying with UPN 38 in 2000, initially working primarily road games with former Bruins goalie Gerry Cheevers and then play-by-play announcer Dave Shea. Beginning with the 2005–06 season, Brickley called all games, doing the road games with Jack Edwards and the home games with Dale Arnold. From the 2007–08 season to the 2023-2024 season, he and Edwards called all of NESN's Bruins telecasts. He received a 2011 Stanley Cup ring and also served as the master of ceremonies during the Bruins banner night celebrations. Brickley also did color commentary for Versus, and has occasionally done the same with NBCSN for their televised NHL games as a guest commentator. Since the 2024-2025 season Brickley has been announcing Bruins games alongside Judd Sirott.

Brickley is known for using the phrase "get their skating game going" when the Bruins are mired in a stretch of lackluster play.

In 2018 Brickley started hosting the show On Course With Andy Brickley which airs on NESN and follows Brickley interviewing athletes and other notable people while playing golf. The show won a New England Emmy Award in the Sports interview/Discussion category in 2018.

== Personal life ==
Brickley currently resides in Hingham, Massachusetts with his wife and two daughters. Diane Brickley is on the board of directors for Good Sports, an organization that donates sporting goods to community organizations that offer sports programs to disadvantaged youths. Brickley is a supporter of the Boston Red Sox, and enjoys playing golf, and working on crossword puzzles. In 2020 Brickley and his wife bought a home in Nantucket where they spend their Summers.

Brickley has a history of athletic prowess in his family. His grandfather, George Brickley, played for the Philadelphia Athletics in 1913. His great-uncle was college football player and coach Charles Brickley. His younger brother Quintin, also played hockey for the University of New Hampshire. His nephew Connor Brickley played for the University of Vermont and was selected to play with Team USA at the 2012 World Junior Ice Hockey Championships.

His nephew Daniel Brickley also plays ice hockey.

== Career statistics ==
			Regular season					Playoffs
Season	Team	League	GP	G	A	Pts	PIM	GP	G	A	Pts	PIM
1979–80	New Hampshire Wildcats	ECAC	27	15	17	32	8	—	—	—	—	—
1980–81	New Hampshire Wildcats	ECAC	31	27	25	52	16	—	—	—	—	—
1981–82	New Hampshire Wildcats	ECAC	35	26	27	53	6	—	—	—	—	—
1982–83	Maine Mariners	AHL	76	29	54	83	10	17	9	5	14	0
1982–83	Philadelphia Flyers	NHL	3	1	1	2	0	—	—	—	—	—
1983–84	Baltimore Skipjacks	AHL	4	0	5	5	2	—	—	—	—	—
1983–84	Springfield Indians	AHL	7	1	5	6	2	—	—	—	—	—
1983–84	Pittsburgh Penguins	NHL	50	18	20	38	9	—	—	—	—	—
1984–85	Baltimore Skipjacks	AHL	31	13	14	27	8	15	10	8	18	0
1984–85	Pittsburgh Penguins	NHL	45	7	15	22	10	—	—	—	—	—
1985–86	Maine Mariners	AHL	60	26	34	60	20	5	0	4	4	0
1986–87	New Jersey Devils	NHL	51	11	12	23	8	—	—	—	—	—
1987–88	Utica Devils	AHL	9	5	8	13	4	—	—	—	—	—
1987–88	New Jersey Devils	NHL	45	8	14	22	14	4	0	1	1	4
1988–89	Boston Bruins	NHL	71	13	22	35	20	10	0	2	2	0
1989–90	Boston Bruins	NHL	43	12	28	40	8	2	0	0	0	0
1990–91	Boston Bruins	NHL	40	2	9	11	8	—	—	—	—	—
1990–91	Maine Mariners	AHL	17	8	17	25	2	1	0	0	0	0
1991–92	Boston Bruins	NHL	23	10	17	27	2	—	—	—	—	—
1991–92	Maine Mariners	AHL	14	5	15	20	2	—	—	—	—	—
1992–93	Moncton Hawks	AHL	38	15	36	51	10	5	4	2	6	0
1992–93	Winnipeg Jets	NHL	12	0	2	2	2	1	1	1	2	0
1993–94	Moncton Hawks	AHL	53	20	39	59	20	19	8	19	27	4
1993–94	Winnipeg Jets	NHL	2	0	0	0	0	—	—	—	—	—
1994–95	Denver Grizzlies	IHL	58	15	35	50	16	16	5	25	30	2
1995–96	Utah Grizzlies	IHL	36	12	34	46	24	16	6	13	19	8
1996–97	Utah Grizzlies	IHL	1	1	0	1	0	7	1	0	1	0
1999–00	Providence Bruins	AHL	3	0	1	1	0	—	—	—	—	—
NHL totals			385	82	140	222	81	17	1	4	5	4

== Awards and honors ==
Hockey

Award	Year
All-ECAC Hockey First Team	1981–82
AHCA East All-American	1981–82
First Team All New England	1981–82
Melrose High School Athletics Hall of Fame	1988
Turner Cup Champion	1994–95
Turner Cup Champion	1995-96
University of New Hampshire Athletics Hall of Fame	1998

Baseball

Award	Year
NCAA First Team All-American	1981-1982
