= WHDH =

The callsign WHDH may represent:

- WHDH (TV) (digital channel 35, virtual channel 7): an independent television station in Boston, Massachusetts that was formerly affiliated with CBS and NBC
- WHDH-TV (channel 5): a television station in Boston that existed from 1957 to 1972; replaced by WCVB-TV
- WEEI (AM) 850, a radio station in Boston that previously used the WHDH callsign
