= Dave Shea (sportscaster) =

Irish-American sportscaster

David W. Shea
- Born: 1950 (age 75–76)
- Occupation: Sportscaster

David W. Shea (born c. 1950) is an Irish-American sportscaster, who is best known as the former ice hockey announcer for Hockey East and the Boston Bruins and a back-up basketball announcer for the Minnesota Timberwolves. He was inducted into the Massachusetts Hockey Hall of Fame on November 19, 2008.

== Career ==
He began calling the college game in 1984 and joined the Bruins telecasts on NESN as a fill-in play-by-play, a color commentator, and studio host in 1986, joining Fred Cusick and Derek Sanderson, doing so until 1995. This meant that he missed the beginnings and ends of periods as he moved from ice level to the broadcast booth and back. He was also a play-by-play announcer for ESPN's coverage of the NCAA Hockey Regionals from 1994 to 1997.

He was named the road play-by-play announcer for the Bruins (Dale Arnold did home games) in 1997 after hall-of-famer Cusick and former Bruins analyst Sanderson retired. He held that position until the 2004 Stanley Cup Playoffs.

After the 2004–05 lockout, Shea took a temporary job with the Washington Nationals baseball team as a radio analyst. NESN did not renew his contract, fearing his unavailability for Bruins games in the case of the Nationals qualifying for the playoffs. He was replaced by Jack Edwards, formerly of ESPN.

== Additional work ==
A thirty-plus-year broadcasting veteran, Shea has called hockey, football, soccer and basketball for numerous professional and college teams, including the Minnesota Timberwolves, Boston Breakers, Atlanta Chiefs, Georgia Tech Yellow Jackets, Harvard Crimson and the Boston College Eagles. He also served as the radio voice of the Pawtucket Red Sox for three summers during the mid-1990s.

He had been a co-host briefly on WEEI on The Big Show with Glenn Ordway in its infancy.

Shea worked the 2006 Ivy League football season for CN8 on Comcast.

He has also worked as a car salesman at South Shore Volkswagen (formerly Hanover Volkswagen).

Shea is currently the Senior Vice President for the Regional Sports Media Group, which is a subsidiary of BBI Marketing. The company is best known for dealing with Bob's Stores, the Massachusetts Interscholastic Athletic Association (MIAA), Lowe's Home Improvement Stores, Manulife Financial, and publishes the Hockey Magazine.

== Personal ==
An avid golfer, Shea lives in Pembroke, Massachusetts, with his wife, Pam, sons Brendan, Christopher, Timothy, and Daniel, and daughter Jillian.

== See also ==
- List of Boston Bruins broadcasters
- List of Minnesota Timberwolves broadcasters
- List of Washington Nationals broadcasters
