= Johnny Peirson =

Canadian ice hockey player (1925–2021)

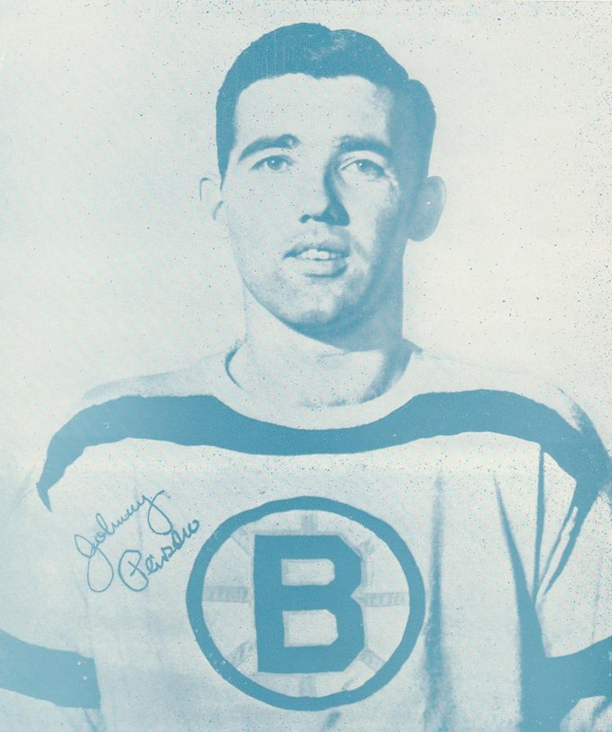
- pictured c. 1957 for Bruins
- Born: July 21, 1925 Winnipeg, Manitoba, Canada
- Died: April 16, 2021 (aged 95) Wayland, Massachusetts, U.S.
- Height: 5 ft 11 in (180 cm)
- Weight: 170 lb (77 kg; 12 st 2 lb)
- Position: Right Wing
- Shot: Right
- Played for: Boston Bruins
- Playing career: 1946–1958

John Frederick Peirson (July 21, 1925 – April 16, 2021) was a Canadian professional ice hockey player who was a winger for 11 seasons in the National Hockey League (NHL) with the Boston Bruins from 1946 to 1958. After retiring he became a commentator for the Bruins, serving in that role for more than two decades.

Peirson played one season of university hockey with the McGill Redmen and was part of their Queen's Cup-winning side in 1946. He was signed by the Boston Bruins and played for two of their minor league affiliates until 1947 when he made his NHL debut. After spending eight seasons with the organization and making two All-Star appearances and the 1953 Stanley Cup Final, he briefly retired in 1954 before returning the following year. He went on to play three more seasons and reached two more Stanley Cup Final before retiring for good in 1958.

== Early life ==
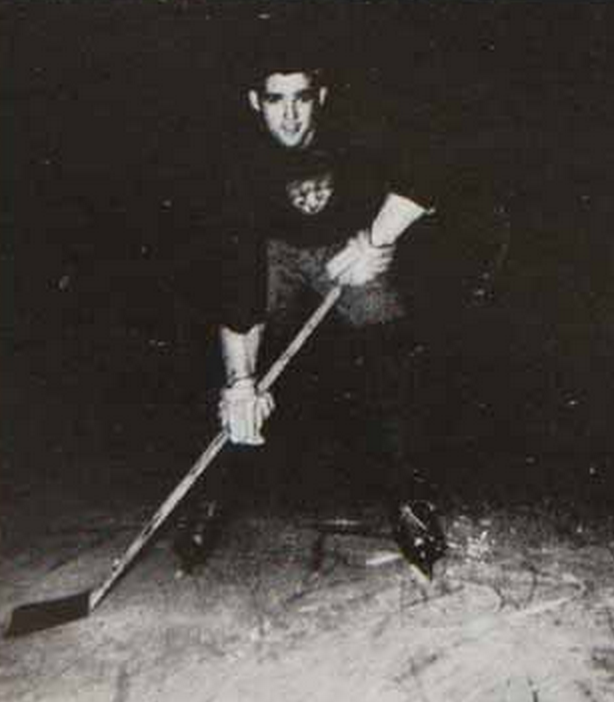
Peirson pictured c. 1946 at McGill University

Peirson was born in Winnipeg, Manitoba, on July 21, 1925. His family relocated to Montreal when he was 10 years old, and he spent the remaining part of his childhood there. He played for the Montreal Junior Canadiens when he was 18. Peirson served in the Canadian Army during World War II and was stationed in the European theatre.

After his stint in the military, Peirson was accepted into McGill University in 1945, and played one season for the McGill Redmen. He was part of the team that won the Queen's Cup. Peirson scored a goal and had an assist in the championship game, in which the Redmen defeated the Toronto Varsity Blues 4–1 in an upset. It turned out to be McGill's final Queen's Cup for more than 60 years until they won it once again in 2008.

== Professional career ==
=== Minor leagues ===
During the 1945–46 season, Peirson was scouted by the Boston Bruins. They extended an offer to him for a pro tryout at the end of the season. Peirson, who was keen to earn some extra money for his education, accepted the opportunity and intended to return to school if his hockey career did not work out. He began his career with the Boston Olympics, the Bruins farm team that were members of the Eastern Hockey League. There, he amassed 15 points (including five goals) in just 10 games in 1946–47. He was promoted to the Hershey Bears of the American Hockey League that same year. Meanwhile, the National Hockey League (NHL) was engulfed in a gambling scandal that resulted in the expulsion of several players. This enabled elite young prospects like Peirson an opportunity to play in the NHL.

=== Boston Bruins (1947–1958) ===
Peirson made his NHL debut for the Boston Bruins on January 4, 1947, against the Montreal Canadiens at Montreal Forum. He was the fifth of nine alumni from McGill to play in the NHL. He was limited to only five games during his rookie season and did not record any points. His first two seasons were split between the Bruins and the Bears. His playing time in the NHL increased to 15 games during his sophomore season, and 59 games in 1948–49. In the latter season, he had the seventh-most goals in the NHL (22), the tenth-most points (43), and the eighth-highest goals per game (0.37).

During the 1949–50 season, Peirson finished fifth in the league in goals (27) and eighth in points (52). He also had the fourth-highest goals per game (0.47) and fifth-highest points per game (0.91). He was named to his first NHL All-Star Game that same year. Peirson proceeded to lead the league in games played with 70 the following season. He was again selected to the All-Star Game that year. He briefly retired at the end of 1953–54 season, in which he finished ninth in the NHL in both goals (21) and goals per game (0.31). However, he reversed his decision in the middle of the 1955–56 season and returned on December 15, playing against the Chicago Blackhawks.

Peirson hit 20 or more goals in four seasons (1949, 1950, 1952, and 1954). The Bruins reached three Stanley Cup Final during his career (1953, 1957, and 1958), but lost each time. He retired for a second and final time in 1958, after injuries began to take a toll. His "legs sort of disappeared", and he had earlier suffered a broken right jaw in December 1952, which kept him sidelined for three weeks and necessitated his wearing a steel protective mask upon his return. He finished his NHL career with 153 goals and 173 assists for 326 points in 545 games.

== Post-playing career ==
After retiring from professional hockey, Peirson was initially employed at the furniture manufacturing plant owned by his father-in-law. He later became a prominent broadcaster and colour analyst for the Bruins. He first worked on WBZ radio in 1969 alongside Fred Cusick, with whom as a player he had done a TV demonstration during one of CBS-TV's short-lived weekly NHL telecasts. He went on to work on WSBK television starting in 1971. Peirson was initially paired with Don Earle, before being reunited with Cusick, who had moved from radio to TV. The pair would work together in that capacity for 18 years and notably covered the first four games of the Summit Series for American viewers. Peirson later shifted to the studio in 1985, before retiring a decade later at the end of the 1994–95 season.

Peirson was also an avid golfer, competing as an amateur in tournaments in Canada and the United States. He finished in a tie for 51st at the 1950 Canadian Open held at Royal Montreal Golf Club.

In 2023, he would be named one of the top 100 Bruins players of all time.

== Personal life ==
Peirson married Barbara Ann (Hunt) around 1951, and they were married for 70 years until his death. Together, they had four children: Robert, John Jr., Pamela, and Susan.

Peirson died on April 16, 2021, at his home in Wayland, Massachusetts. He was 95 years old, and was the last surviving player of McGill's 1946 Queen's Cup-winning team.

== Career statistics ==
			Regular season					Playoffs
Season	Team	League	GP	G	A	Pts	PIM	GP	G	A	Pts	PIM
1943–44	Montreal Jr. Canadiens	QJHL	15	1	2	3	4	3	2	0	2	8
1945–46	McGill Redmen	MCHL	6	13	5	18	—	—	—	—	—	—
1946–47	Boston Bruins	NHL	5	0	0	0	0	—	—	—	—	—
1946–47	Boston Olympics	EAHL	10	5	10	15	24	—	—	—	—	—
1946–47	Hershey Bears	AHL	26	11	11	22	32	11	3	2	5	10
1947–48	Boston Bruins	NHL	15	4	2	6	0	5	3	2	5	0
1947–48	Hershey Bears	AHL	36	14	26	40	39	—	—	—	—	—
1948–49	Boston Bruins	NHL	59	22	21	43	45	5	3	1	4	4
1949–50	Boston Bruins	NHL	57	27	25	52	49	—	—	—	—	—
1950–51	Boston Bruins	NHL	70	19	19	38	43	2	1	1	2	2
1951–52	Boston Bruins	NHL	68	20	30	50	30	7	0	2	2	4
1952–53	Boston Bruins	NHL	49	14	15	29	32	11	3	6	9	2
1953–54	Boston Bruins	NHL	68	21	19	40	55	4	0	0	0	2
1955–56	Boston Bruins	NHL	33	11	14	25	10	—	—	—	—	—
1956–57	Boston Bruins	NHL	68	13	26	39	41	10	0	3	3	12
1957–58	Boston Bruins	NHL	53	2	2	4	10	5	0	1	1	0
NHL totals			545	153	173	326	315	49	10	16	26	26
