= WHDH-TV (channel 5) =

Television station in Boston (1957–1972)

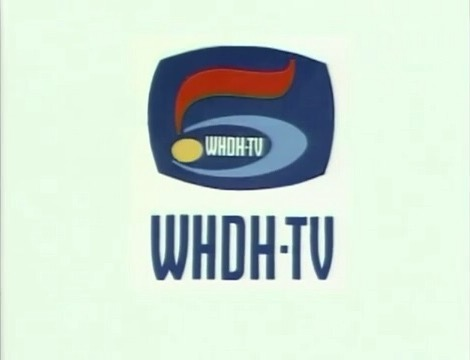
- Boston, Massachusetts; United States
- Channels: Analog: 5 (VHF)

Ownership
- Owner: Boston Herald Traveler; (WHDH, Inc.)
- Sister stations: WHDH; WHDH-FM

History
- First air date: November 26, 1957
- Last air date: March 18, 1972
- Former affiliations: ABC (1957–1960); CBS (1961–1972)
- Call sign meaning: sequentially assigned to former radio sister station WHDH (AM)

Technical information
- ERP: 100 kW
- HAAT: 306 m (1,004 ft)

WHDH-TV (channel 5) was a television station in Boston, Massachusetts, United States. The station, owned by the Boston Herald Traveler, operated from 1957 until the revocation of the station's license in 1972. The channel 5 allocation in the market was taken over by WCVB-TV, which operates using a separate license from WHDH-TV; the original WHDH-TV is also of no relation to the current WHDH (channel 7).

== History ==
The station first signed on the air on November 26, 1957. It was owned by the Boston Herald Traveler Corporation, along with WHDH radio (850 AM, now WEEI; and 94.5 FM, now WJMN). Before the Herald-Traveler signed the station on, the DuMont Television Network applied for the channel 5 construction permit to replace WDTV in Pittsburgh among its owned-and-operated station group, but DuMont shut down its network before being able to acquire the permit. WHDH-TV was originally an ABC affiliate, but switched to CBS on January 1, 1961. The move was initiated by CBS after its existing Boston station, WNAC-TV (channel 7) was agreed to be sold by RKO General to NBC in a deal which ultimately never materialized.

Initially, WHDH-TV shared studio facilities with WHDH radio located at 6 St. James Avenue in Boston's Back Bay; but this facility was far from ideal for television and in early 1960, the station moved into a newly built studio center at 50 Morrisey Boulevard in the Dorchester section of Boston. Channel 5 was the first television station in New England to originate live (and later taped) local programming in color. In 1959, WHDH-TV debuted a local version of Bozo the Clown with Frank Avruch as Bozo; in 1966, 130 episodes taped by WHDH-TV that year would go into national syndication for television stations that did not want to produce a local Bozo show.

Almost as soon as it signed on, the Federal Communications Commission (FCC) began investigating allegations of impropriety in the granting of the television license. This touched off a struggle that lasted 15 years. As a result, WHDH-TV never had a license longer than six months at a time (television station licenses at the time lasted for three years). In 1969, a local group, Boston Broadcasters Incorporated (BBI), was granted a construction permit for a new station on channel 5 under the call letters WCVB-TV after promising to air more local programming than any other station in America at the time (even though WHDH often broadcast more local programming, in terms of hours per week, than any other commercial television station in the market). The challenger was also critical of the combination of the Herald-Traveler newspaper and WHDH-AM-FM-TV. Herald-Traveler Corporation fought the decision in court, but lost its battle in 1972; and Boston Broadcasters was awarded a full license.

In the months after the Herald-Traveler lost the channel 5 license, it was under court order to sign off daily at 1 a.m. so that WCVB-TV could test its equipment. WHDH-TV declined to sell its studios, transmitter and tower to the new WCVB-TV, which subsequently leased space on the tower belonging to WBZ-TV (channel 4) and remodeled a former International Harvester sales and service facility in Needham to serve as its studios and offices. All of WHDH-TV's talent, however, transferred to WCVB. At 11:25 p.m., Harold E. Clancy, president of WHDH-TV, delievered a final editorial for the station:

A few hours from now, at 3 a.m. Sunday, WHDH will terminate its television operation pursuant to an order of the Federal Communications Commission. From and after that hour, WCVB, the station of Boston Broadcasters, Inc., will begin operation of channel 5 under Program Test Authority from the FCC.

For us, it will mark the end of 14 years of television broadcasting in this community in which all of us here live and work and to which we owe so very much. Before these last few hours pass, before we finally shut down our cameras and darken our studios and disconnect our transmitter, it seems appropriate to address a few brief valedictory remarks to the great number of viewers we have been privileged to serve for almost a decade and a half.

We at WHDH-TV want to thank all who have made this possible for us to achieve and maintain a standard of performance in which we take pride. There are so many to thank. There are members of our program advisory committee who gave unselfishly of their time and talent.

There are many guests, men and women in high political office, judges, lawyers, doctors, businessmen, teachers, students, left-fielders, fullbacks, chefs, artists, musicians, so many of them, and they all came before our cameras to share our thoughts and plans and views with all of us. We would thank, also, the many men and women in public information or public relations who helped us keep aware of the new and changing public service needs of our community.

As a spokesman for the management of WHDH-TV, I must express the deepest gratitude to the staff of this station. The record number of broadcasting's most prestigious awards that they have won for this station both locally and nationally speaks for itself.

However, we salute these loyal, steadfast, and talented people, all of them in every job, on-camera or off, for their courage as well. To maintain a standard of excellence under normal conditions is remarkable. To do so under the burden of unusual problems and frustrations is gallant.

There are so many others, I cannot list them all. Our national and local advertisers whose confidence is us has made our operation possible, our consultants, our outside contributors, all who helped.

But most of all, we at WHDH-TV want to take our leave thanking you, thanking the viewers who watched our programs, who wrote to tell us what we were doing right, and who to let us know when we were wrong. We leave with a great debt to you for your loyalty, your support and with the knowledge that we have at least tried to merit it.

We have fought hard to stay on the air. If there were any opportunity left to prevent the change-over at 3 a.m., we would, even now, be pursuing it. But there is none. Therefore, irrespective of the differences between this station and BBI, we sincerely hope that the change will be accomplished without misadventure and without any incovenience to the viewing public. I am sure that WCVB is fully prepared to begin its operations and requires no help from us.

However, the beginning of anything is fraught with the danger of unexpected difficulties and the first few days may produce some problems. I hope not. However, should they occur and should WCVB feel that we at WHDH-TV can be of any assistance during this transition, we stand ready to help in any way, small or large, that we can, so that the public will not be inconvenienced.

The editorial was followed by WHDH-TV's last telecast: Fixed Bayonets! (1951), a late movie. The telecast began at 11:30 p.m. on March 18, 1972, and ended at 1:25 a.m. It was followed by the station's nightly sign off, then a black screen for 90 minutes until the transition to WCVB-TV at 3 a.m. on March 19, 1972.

CBS, preferring an "association with broadcast groups which have significant professional broadcast experience", moved its affiliation back to WNAC-TV, which had been owned by RKO General and its predecessors since 1948. The ABC affiliation then went to the new WCVB-TV.

The WHDH-TV call letters were subsequently reassigned to channel 7 almost 18 years to the day of their last use, on March 12, 1990, where they remain to this day.

== News operation ==
WHDH's newscasts were known as WHDH-TV News, a title that was used until March 18, 1972, when the station signed off for the last time and was replaced by WCVB.

Among the anchors who worked there were John Day, Jack Hynes, John Henning, and Chet Curtis. The lead sports anchor beginning in 1962 was Don Gillis (prior to that, sports scores were read by the news anchor) while weather reports were done first by Fred B. Cole, then Ray Miller, and finally Bob Copeland.

The station won several awards for news coverage, including multiple honors as "National News Film Station of the Year" from the National Press Photographers Association. When WCVB launched, nearly all of the former WHDH news staffers were hired by that station.

== Sports coverage ==
WHDH was television home of the Boston Red Sox baseball franchise from 1958 to 1971; with Curt Gowdy, Ned Martin, and later, Ken Coleman doing play-by-play, with analysis during the 1960s provided by former star Red Sox pitcher Mel Parnell, and starting in 1969, by former Sox star Johnny Pesky. Although these announcers worked on both television and radio, the games were simulcast only through 1960; after that, the announcers would go back-and-forth between radio and television broadcasts. For televised games beginning in 1961, the analyst would perform color commentary for the entire game with Gowdy (through 1965) or Coleman (1966–71) doing the play-by-play of innings 1-3 and 7-9 on television (and innings 4-6 on radio); while Martin called innings 1-3 and 7-9 on radio along with the middle innings on television. An average of 56 regular-season games were televised each year, equally split between home and away matches, with all but a handful being on weekends. The games were also fed to other television stations (mainly CBS affiliates) across the New England region.

During the 1964–65 and 1965–66 seasons, WHDH also televised a few Boston Bruins hockey games. These games were broadcast on Sundays, usually pre-recorded on tape, with either Saturday night games shown on Sunday afternoons, or Sunday night games shown on tape delay after that evening's 11 p.m. newscast. One game, on February 12, 1966, a Saturday matinee from the old Madison Square Garden in New York City against the New York Rangers was carried live and in color back to Boston, using a color mobile unit owned by WOR-TV in New York—which produced a videotaped broadcast of the game to air in that market that evening.

The station also broadcast a handful of Boston Celtics basketball games during the early-to-mid 1960s. These were usually weekend afternoon games that were not televised nationally. WHDH broadcast Celtics playoff away games from 1962 to 1966; it also televises live coverage of the seventh and final game of the 1962 NBA Finals between the Celtics and the Los Angeles Lakers from the old Boston Garden—a game that was not nationally televised. Only WHDH and KTLA in Los Angeles carried it, with Don Gillis doing the game for WHDH and Chick Hearn doing the KTLA broadcast.

In 1965, Celtics' playoff away games were also shown on the newly launched WIHS-TV (channel 38, now WSBK-TV). WIHS carried some regular-season Celtics' road games during the 1964–65 season, but team officials, worried about the low penetration of UHF receivers in the Boston area, arranged for WHDH to simulcast 1965 playoff games in order to reach a wider audience. WHDH alone was the television home of the Celtics in the 1965–66 season, with coverage concentrated on away games during the playoffs. Fred Cusick did the Bruins' games; Don Gillis called the Celtics' games.

In October 1958, WHDH launched a weekly candlepin bowling show that aired at noon on Saturdays. Initially co-hosted by Jim Britt and Don Gillis, Gillis eventually became the solo host. The show was extremely successful and remained on channel 5 (with Gillis still as host) until January 1996, long after WHDH had given way to WCVB.

In 1968, with the Harvard University football team about to host arch-rival Yale University in a showdown of unbeaten teams for the Ivy League football championship, WHDH made plans to cover the game. Due to ABC Sports' deal with the National Collegiate Athletic Association (NCAA) that precluded live telecasts of games not part of the ABC/NCAA package, WHDH broadcast the game on tape the next day, with Gillis doing play-by-play.

== Notable former on-air staff ==
- Frank Avruch – booth announcer; also played Bozo the Clown (1959–1970)
- Jim Britt – sportscaster
- Ken Coleman – sportscaster and play-by-play of Boston Red Sox games (1966–1971)
- Bill Crowley – sportscaster; analyst on Boston Bruins games (1964–1966)
- Chet Curtis – news anchor/reporter
- Fred Cusick – sportscaster; play-by-play commentator of Boston Bruins games (1964–1966)
- Leo Egan – news/sports anchor
- Don Gillis – sportscaster and longtime host of a weekly bowling show; also play-by-play of Boston Celtics games (1962–1964 and 1966)
- Art Gleeson – analyst on Boston Red Sox games (1958–1961)
- Curt Gowdy – sportscaster and play-by-play of Boston Red Sox games (1958–1965)
- Bill Harrington – news reporter
- John Henning – news anchor/reporter
- Peter Hyams – news anchor (now movie director/screenwriter)
- Natalie Jacobson – news anchor (1971–1972)
- Roy Leonard – personality
- Ned Martin – sportscaster and play-by-play of Boston Red Sox games (1961–1971)
- Johnny Most – sportscaster
- Mel Parnell – analyst on Boston Red Sox games (1962–1968)
- Johnny Pesky – analyst on Boston Red Sox games (1969–1971)
- Caroll Spinney – actor; played various characters on Bozo the Clown; later became the longtime performer of Big Bird and Oscar the Grouch on Sesame Street
- Lesley Stahl – reporter
- Bob Wilson – announcer/news reporter/sportscaster
