= Bob Wilson (sportscaster) =

American radio broadcaster

- Born: Robert Henry Castellon; March 9, 1929; Stoneham, Massachusetts, U.S.
- Died: January 15, 2015 (aged 85); Laconia, New Hampshire, U.S.
- Occupation: Broadcaster
- Years active: 1952–1994
- Known for: Radio voice of the Boston Bruins of the National Hockey League (1967–1969; 1971–1994)
- Awards: Foster Hewitt Memorial Award (1987)

Robert Henry Castellon (March 9, 1929 – January 15, 2015), known as Bob Wilson, was an American radio personality and hockey broadcaster who served as the longtime play-by-play announcer of the Boston Bruins of the National Hockey League. In 1987, Wilson was honoured with the Foster Hewitt Memorial Award, enshrining him in the broadcasters' wing of the Hockey Hall of Fame. He was inducted into the Massachusetts Broadcaster's Hall of Fame in 2007. Wilson's booming baritone voice and his ability to articulate for radio listeners the dynamic flow and possession changes of ice hockey distinguished him from his peers. He also was noted for his detailed descriptions of hockey fights, which pleased his fans but sometimes gained him disapproval from critics.

== Early life and career ==
Robert Castellon grew up in the Boston suburb of Arlington and graduated from Arlington High School; he served in the United States Air Force and attended Boston University and the Leland Powers School. He began his broadcasting career in Louisiana, including a stint at a station in Baton Rouge. When he returned to the Boston area as a Top 40 disk jockey at WCOP, he adopted his mother's surname, Wilson, to suit his professional name to the format of the station's on-air jingles. In 1962, he became a staff announcer at WHDH-AM 850 (now WEEI), where he worked as the analyst on Bruins' games and was the weekend sports anchor on the then-WHDH-TV Channel 5, the city's CBS affiliate.

== Boston Bruins ==
From 1964–1967, analyst Wilson served alongside play-by-play men Bill Harrington and Jim Laing on the Bruins' radio network.

In 1967, he succeeded Laing as the voice of the Bruins, his promotion coinciding with the team's rise to Stanley Cup contender, led by Bobby Orr and Phil Esposito. However, when the Bruins moved their broadcasts from WHDH to WBZ-AM 1030 in 1969, former Bruin announcer Fred Cusick regained his longtime (1952–1963) role as the play-by-play man on the radio network. Wilson then left the Boston market entirely and became the sports director of St. Louis television station KMOX-TV. Thus Wilson missed the Bruins' 1970 Stanley Cup triumph.

After the Bruins' 1970–1971 season, Cusick moved from radio to television as the lead announcer on Bruins' telecasts on WSBK-TV. Wilson then returned to Boston, restored by WBZ-AM to his former radio play-by-play post. In Wilson's first year back as voice of the Bruins, he called Boston's 1972 Stanley Cup championship. He then continued as the team's radio voice through 1994 on a series of flagship stations, but he chose to retire during the 1994–1995 NHL lockout.

== Non-hockey-related work ==
After WBZ-TV took over the Boston Red Sox' television rights in 1972, Wilson hosted the station's baseball scoreboard show after weekend games. He later worked part-time hosting a music program on 104.9 FM WLKZ in New Hampshire's Lakes Region, where he had become a longtime resident of Gilford.

On January 15, 2015, Wilson died at the age of 85 in Laconia, New Hampshire, due to lung cancer.
