= Normand Léveillé =

Canadian ice hockey player (born 1963)

- Born: January 10, 1963 (age 63) Montreal, Quebec, Canada
- Height: 6 ft 0 in (183 cm)
- Weight: 172 lb (78 kg; 12 st 4 lb)
- Position: Left wing
- Shot: Left
- Played for: Boston Bruins
- NHL draft: 14th overall, 1981; Boston Bruins
- Playing career: 1981–1982

Normand "Norm" Léveillé (born January 10, 1963) is a Canadian former professional hockey left winger. He played one season and one month in the National Hockey League for the Boston Bruins, before his career was cut short at age 19 by a brain aneurysm suffered during a game at the Pacific Coliseum, which left him unable to walk. After he recovered, Léveillé devoted his energies to therapy for others with disabling conditions. He is the founder and president of the Centre Normand-Léveillé at Drummondville in the Centre-du-Québec region of Quebec. His story is told in Un arrêt en plein vol by Thérèse Desjardins (2005).

== Playing career ==
Léveillé was born in Montreal, Quebec. As a youth, he played in the 1975 and 1976 Quebec International Pee-Wee Hockey Tournaments with a minor ice hockey team from Montreal. He was drafted in the first round, 14th overall in the 1981 NHL entry draft by the Boston Bruins. He was a highly touted prospect coming out of the QMJHL after a 101-point season in his last year with the Chicoutimi Saguenéens. In his rookie year with the Bruins, he scored 33 points in 60 games.

On October 23, 1982, after the first period in a game against the Vancouver Canucks in Vancouver, British Columbia during his second season with the Bruins, Léveillé complained of feeling dizzy and having pains in his shoulder. As the trainers began tending to him, he lost consciousness. He was rushed to a local hospital, where doctors diagnosed a brain aneurysm. Léveillé was rushed into emergency surgery in an effort to save his life. After surgery, he was comatose for three weeks and remained hospitalized for an additional three weeks. He eventually recovered enough to walk again, but at the age of 19, his promising career as an NHL player was over. Doctors confirmed that his aneurysm was caused by a congenital condition and was not triggered by an on-ice incident.

In 1995, the Boston Bruins invited Léveillé to the closing ceremonies of the Boston Garden, where he was allowed to skate on the Garden ice one last time. Bruins captain Ray Bourque helped escort Léveillé around the ice surface.

== Career statistics ==
=== Regular season and playoffs ===
			Regular season					Playoffs
Season	Team	League	GP	G	A	Pts	PIM	GP	G	A	Pts	PIM
1979–80	Chicoutimi Saguenéens	QMJHL	60	24	12	36	39	12	4	6	10	2
1980–81	Chicoutimi Saguenéens	QMJHL	72	55	46	101	46	12	11	15	26	8
1981–82	Boston Bruins	NHL	66	14	19	33	49	—	—	—	—	—
1982–83	Boston Bruins	NHL	9	3	6	9	0	—	—	—	—	—
NHL totals			75	17	25	42	49	—	—	—	—	—

Preceded by Barry Pederson	Boston Bruins first-round draft pick 1981	Succeeded by Gord Kluzak
