= Jim Laing =

James T. Laing is a Canadian sportscaster and radio station owner who spent the 1966-67 NHL season as the radio play by play voice for the Boston Bruins.

== Broadcasting career ==
A native of Weyburn, Laing's career began in 1962 calling junior hockey games in Saskatchewan. While calling games for the Estevan Bruins, Boston Bruins President Weston Adams heard Laing's play by play on scouting trips. Adams was very impressed with Laing's impartiality, especially in games between Estevan and their rivals, the Weyburn Red Wings. According to Boston Bruins announcer Fred Cusick, Laing "was a dead ringer, in voice and inflection, for Foster Hewitt, Canada's legendary hockey announcer". He was hired by Adams in 1966 to call Bruins games on radio. Laing was 23 years old at the time of his hiring. During his tenure in Boston, he was praised by Boston Globe sportswriter Harold Kaese for being "objective and accurate".

Laing was fired after only one season because Bruins management believed that he tended to lean on the negative. He was replaced by Bob Wilson the following season.

== Later career ==
On July 24, 1972, his father, Thomas Laing purchased shares in Soo Line Broadcasting Ltd., owners of CFSL in Weyburn and its satellite station CJSL in Estevan, from Beaver Investments Ltd., A. O. Graham, and J.W.W. Graham. Jim Laing gained controlling interest in the station two years later. In addition to owning the station, Laing was also the station manager. He sold Soo Line Broadcasting to Golden West Broadcasting in 1995.
