= Judd Sirott =

American sportscaster

Judd Sirott (born January 6, 1969) is an American sportscaster who currently works as the play by play announcer for the Boston Bruins on NESN.

Prior to working on TV, Sirott appeared on WBZ-FM's coverage of the Boston Bruins where he replaced Dave Goucher as the radio voice of the Bruins starting with the 2017–18 season through the 2023–24 season. He previously appeared on WGN-AM's broadcasts of the Chicago Blackhawks where he served as the pregame, intermission and post game host.

He also has done work for the Chicago Cubs baseball, when his duties included play-by-play during the 5th inning, scoreboard updates for other MLB games throughout the broadcast, and hosting the pregame and postgame shows on WGN Radio. When the Cubs changed their flagship station to WBBM, Sirott did not make the move, opting to stay with WGN.

Previously, Sirott was the broadcast voice of the Chicago Wolves of the American Hockey League for 12 seasons. He also telecast NHL games for HDNet.

Sirott graduated from Buffalo Grove High School in 1987 and the University of Michigan in 1991. He is the nephew of veteran Chicago broadcaster Bob Sirott. Sirott was hired and promoted as the new play by play announcer for the Boston Bruins on NESN starting in the 24/25 season. He replaced longtime Bruins announcer Jack Edwards.
