= Dan Roche =

American sports broadcaster

- Born: Methuen, Massachusetts, U.S.
- Education: Syracuse University
- Occupation: Sports television personality
- Employer: WBZ-TV

Dan Roche is an American sports anchor and reporter for WBZ-TV and WSBK-TV in Boston for over 20 years.

== Early life and education ==
Roche was born in Methuen, Massachusetts. He attended and North Andover High School and then enrolled at Nasson College. When the college shut down in 1983, Roche transferred to Syracuse University. He graduated from S.I. Newhouse School of Public Communications with a Bachelor’s degree in Broadcast Journalism in 1987.

During college, he joined WAER-FM as a freshman and was mentored by Sean McDonough, who was a senior at Syracuse.

== Career ==
Roche's early career included stints at WCCM, WCGY, WHDH, and WRKO. Roche was also a color commentator with Bob Fouracre on a Worcester bowling show in the early 80's.

From 1994-2000, before joining WBZ-TV, Roche worked at WBZ Radio. Here he was a midday sports anchor, Boston Bruins studio host, and co-hosted talk shows with Steve DeOssie and Barry Pederson.

Roche joined WBZ-TV in October 2000 as a weekend sports anchor and reporter. Since 2003, he has hosted "Red Sox This Week" on sister station WSBK (myTV38). Roche also served as WSBK's field reporter during Red Sox games from 2003-2005. Roche also serves as a reporter on Patriots Game Day and Patriots 5th Quarter. He has been nominated twice for an Emmy Award for Best Sports Reporter in New England.

Since 2013, he has done New England Patriots preseason games as a play-by-play announcer. Roche has appeared on many radio programs for 98.5 the Sports Hub. Including Toucher and Rich. Dan won Toucher and Rich's 98-Mile rap battle contest on August 16, 2016 performing live at Toucher and Rich's 10th Anniversary Show, winning over current 98.5 Sports Hub host, New England Patriots radio color commentator and former NFL backup quarterback, Scott Zolak.

Roche was National Sports Media Association Sportscaster of the Year in 2014 and the Massachusetts Sportscaster of the Year in 2017.

== Personal life ==
Roche lives in Andover, Massachusetts with his wife Pam and their two children.
