= Gord Kluzak =

Canadian ice hockey player (born 1964)

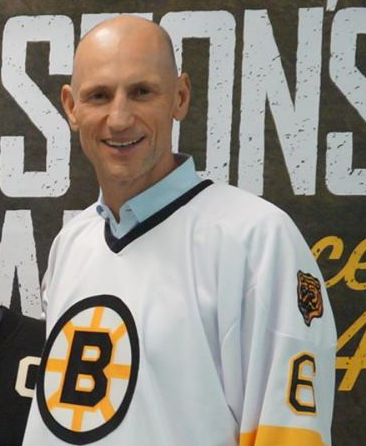
- Born: March 4, 1964 (age 62) Climax, Saskatchewan, Canada
- Height: 6 ft 4 in (193 cm)
- Weight: 220 lb (100 kg; 15 st 10 lb)
- Position: Defence
- Shot: Left
- Played for: Boston Bruins
- NHL draft: 1st overall, 1982; Boston Bruins
- Playing career: 1982–1991

Gordon Glen Kluzak (born March 4, 1964) is a Canadian former professional hockey player who played for the Boston Bruins of the National Hockey League (NHL) from 1982 to 1991. He was selected first overall by the Bruins in the 1982 NHL entry draft. Kluzak was plagued with injuries for much of his career, missing two full seasons and playing a combined thirteen games over his last three seasons, and is widely considered a draft bust.

== Playing career ==
Gord Kluzak was born in Climax, Saskatchewan. He grew up on a wheat farm, and attended high school at Athol Murray College of Notre Dame in Wilcox, Saskatchewan.

Kluzak played junior hockey for two seasons with the WHL's Billings Bighorns, where he was paired on defence with future NHLer Bob Rouse. He missed half of the 1981–82 season and entire 1982 playoffs after he tore ligaments in his left knee in a game against the Medicine Hat Tigers on Feb. 9, 1982, which would be the first of many knee problems for Kluzak.

The injury did not hurt his draft placement however, as he was rated as the No. 3 overall prospect and the No. 2 WHL prospect for the 1982 NHL entry draft by The Hockey News.

Harry Sinden, the Boston Bruins general manager, was sold on the young defenceman, and made him the 1st overall pick in that year's draft. Sinden passed up on Kitchener Rangers star Brian Bellows, who was the popular choice amongst Bruin fans, and Gary Nylund of the Portland Winter Hawks, who many, including The Hockey News, felt was the better defenceman. Sinden made a deal with the Minnesota North Stars, who had the second pick that year, where he agreed to leave Bellows available as the second overall pick in exchange for Brad Palmer and Dave Donnelly.

Kluzak was out of hockey at the age of 27, felled by knee injuries, after playing in only 299 NHL games. He managed to avoid knee injuries for his first two NHL seasons. However, on Oct. 7, 1984, Kluzak tore ligaments in his left knee when he collided in mid-ice with New Jersey Devils defenceman Dave Lewis. This required major reconstructive surgery and forced Kluzak to miss the entire 1984–85 season and 1985 playoffs. After playing 70 of the 80 games in the 1985–86 season, he re-injured the knee in September 1986 and missed the 1986–87 season.

Kluzak's best year in the NHL may have been 1987–88, when he was able to play 66 of Boston's 80 games, and all 23 playoff games, as Boston went to the 1988 Stanley Cup Final. After that, his chronic knee problems resulted in 11 surgeries, over the next three seasons, during which he played in only 13 more games. On November 12, 1990, just days after being able to take the ice for only his second game of the 1990–91 season, Kluzak announced his retirement.

For battling through his injuries, having missed two full seasons yet showing his continued perseverance, sportsmanship, and dedication to ice hockey, Kluzak won the Bill Masterton Memorial Trophy for his injury shortened 1989–90 season. A number of his fellow 1982 first round draftees went on to long careers in the NHL, including: Bellows (2nd pick, 1,188 NHL games); Nylund (3rd, 608 NHL games); Scott Stevens (5th, 1,635 NHL games), Phil Housley (6th, 1,495 NHL games); Dave Andreychuk (16th, 1,639 NHL games); and Ken Daneyko (18th, 1,283 NHL games).

== International play ==
Gord Kluzak
Medal record

Men's ice hockey

World Junior Championships
Gold medal – first place	1982	Ice hockey

In 1982 Kluzak was chosen to represent Canada at the World Junior Championships. Prior to 1982 Canada had sent the defending Memorial Cup champions to represent the country at the world juniors. Due to the Memorial Cup champion's lack of success, 1982 became the first year that the top players in the country were sent.

Led by Kluzak and Kingston Canadians goaltender Mike Moffat, the Canadians outscored the opposition 45–14, including a 7–0 rout of the Soviet Union, en route to the country's first gold medal at the event.

Kluzak and his teammates stood at the blue line and sang the Canadian national anthem as the organizers in Rochester, Minnesota had not expected Canada to win and did not have a recording of "O Canada".

== Post-retirement ==
After being forced to retire prematurely, Kluzak enrolled at Harvard University, graduating in 1994 with a degree in Economics, and spent two years as the Chief of Staff for the state lottery. He then returned to Harvard, earning an MBA in 1998. Since then, he has worked for Goldman Sachs.

Kluzak also worked as a color commentator on Bruins telecasts from 1995–96 through 2003–04. He worked for NESN as a studio analyst from 2005–15, many with Dale Arnold.

== Career statistics ==
=== Regular season and playoffs ===
			Regular season					Playoffs
Season	Team	League	GP	G	A	Pts	PIM	GP	G	A	Pts	PIM
1980–81	Billings Bighorns	WHL	68	4	34	38	160	5	0	1	1	4
1981–82	Billings Bighorns	WHL	38	9	24	33	110	—	—	—	—	—
1982–83	Boston Bruins	NHL	70	1	6	7	105	17	1	4	5	54
1983–84	Boston Bruins	NHL	80	10	27	37	135	3	0	0	0	0
1985–86	Boston Bruins	NHL	70	8	31	39	155	3	1	1	2	16
1987–88	Boston Bruins	NHL	66	6	31	37	135	23	4	8	12	59
1988–89	Boston Bruins	NHL	3	0	1	1	2	—	—	—	—	—
1989–90	Boston Bruins	NHL	8	0	2	2	11	—	—	—	—	—
1990–91	Boston Bruins	NHL	2	0	0	0	0	—	—	—	—	—
NHL totals			299	25	98	123	543	46	6	13	19	129

=== International ===
Year	Team	Event	GP	G	A	Pts	PIM
1982	Canada	WJC	7	0	1	1	4

== Awards ==
- World Junior Championships Best Defenceman:1982
- World Junior Championships All-Star First Team: 1982
- WHL All-Star Second Team: 1981–82
- Canadian Amateur Junior Male Athlete of Year: 1982
- Bill Masterton Memorial Trophy: 1989–90
- Named One of the Top 100 Best Bruins Players of all Time

Preceded by Dale Hawerchuk	NHL first overall draft pick 1982	Succeeded by Brian Lawton
Preceded by Normand Leveille	Boston Bruins first-round draft pick 1982	Succeeded by Nevin Markwart
Preceded by Tim Kerr	Bill Masterton Trophy Winner; 1990	Succeeded by Dave Taylor
