= Rob Simpson =

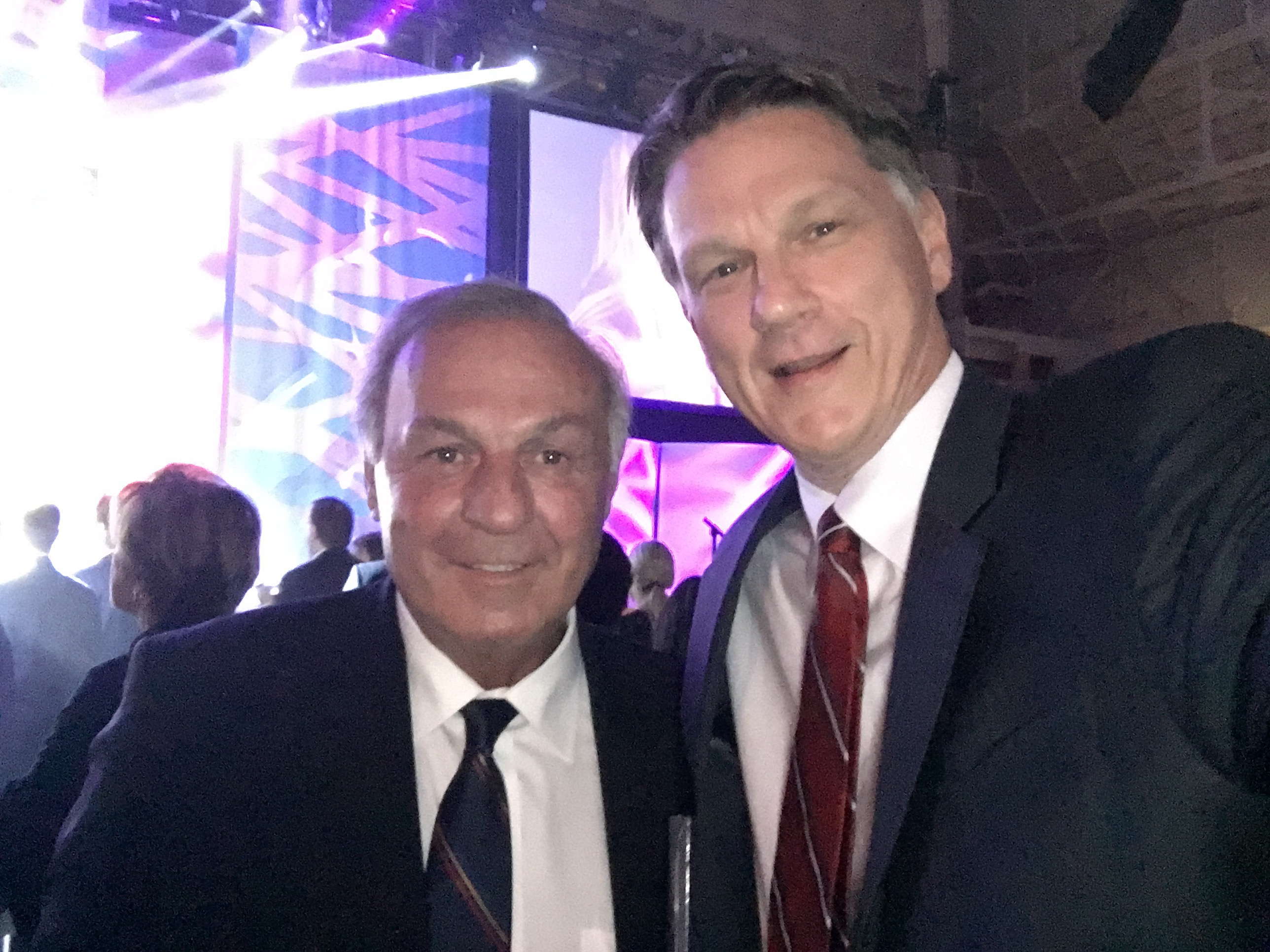
Guy Lafleur and Simpson at a Hockey Hall of Fame anniversary gala in 2018

Rob Simpson is a Michigan-born sportscaster, comic and author residing and working in Vancouver, British Columbia, Canada, and in Seattle. He is a citizen of both countries and the founder and editor of seattlehockeyinsider.com and vancouverhockeyinsider.com. He co-hosted Stellick and Simmer in the morning with Gord Stellick on Sirius-XM NHL Network radio for four full hockey seasons beginning in September, 2015. Simpson previously hosted NHL Live and the Cisco All-Access Pregame Show on the same network, a simulcast program produced at the NHL headquarters in New York that also aired on NHL Network television. He previously worked as the rinkside reporter for Boston Bruins games on NESN for three seasons beginning in 2005, followed by the Madison Square Garden Network as a host, web columnist, and live rink reporter in 2010. He created and hosted the program Maple Leaf America on Leafs TV in Toronto for four seasons beginning in 2001.

Simpson began covering professional sports at the age of 16 as a credentialed media member at games of the Detroit Pistons of the NBA and later the Detroit Red Wings of the NHL, interviewing the likes of Larry Bird, Kareem Abdul-Jabbar and Magic Johnson. He and his high school cohort's presence in the postgame scrums brought occasional teasing and ridicule from the athletes, as described in the book No Heavy Lifting. At that point his career path was set, continuing the efforts at Central Michigan University and then professionally around the world. At one point he was Hawaii's first, fulltime TV weatherman.

Simpson has authored four books about the National Hockey League. Between The Lines - Not So Tall Tales From Ray 'Scampy' Scapinello's Four Decades in the NHL in 2006, Black and Gold: Four Decades of the Boston Bruins in Photographs in 2008 and 2010, The Winged Wheel: A Half-Century of The Detroit Red Wings in Photographs in 2012, and Stories From Ice Level - A Great NHL Ref Tells All, with Hockey Hall of Fame honored official Bill McCreary in 2026. Three were published by John Wiley and Sons, the latter by Douglas and McIntyre. Another book, No Heavy Lifting - Globetrotting Adventures of a Sports Media Guy, was published by ECW Press in 2018.

Simpson has taken part in and written about the NHL's humanitarian efforts in Africa with the non-government organization Right To Play. In 2007, he documented the visit of players Andrew Ference of the Boston Bruins and Steve Montador of the Florida Panthers to orphanages in Tanzania, and in 2008, joined Bruins Captain Zdeno Chara's fundraising effort while climbing Mount Kilimanjaro.

== 31 in 31 in 31 ==
From November 16 to December 16, 2018, Simpson embarked on an unprecedented journey, attending 31 NHL games in the 31 different cities over 31 consecutive days. The trip eclipsed the previous record of 30 NHL cities (the total number of teams at the time) in 30 straight days, completed successfully by hockey fan Rob Suggitt of Edmonton in March and April 2015. Both men used the trips to raise funds for charity, in Simpson's case, for the Hockey Fights Cancer initiative. The NHL added its 31st franchise in 2017 making the new record possible. The league added a 32nd team in 2021.
