= Naoko Funayama =

Japanese American sportscaster

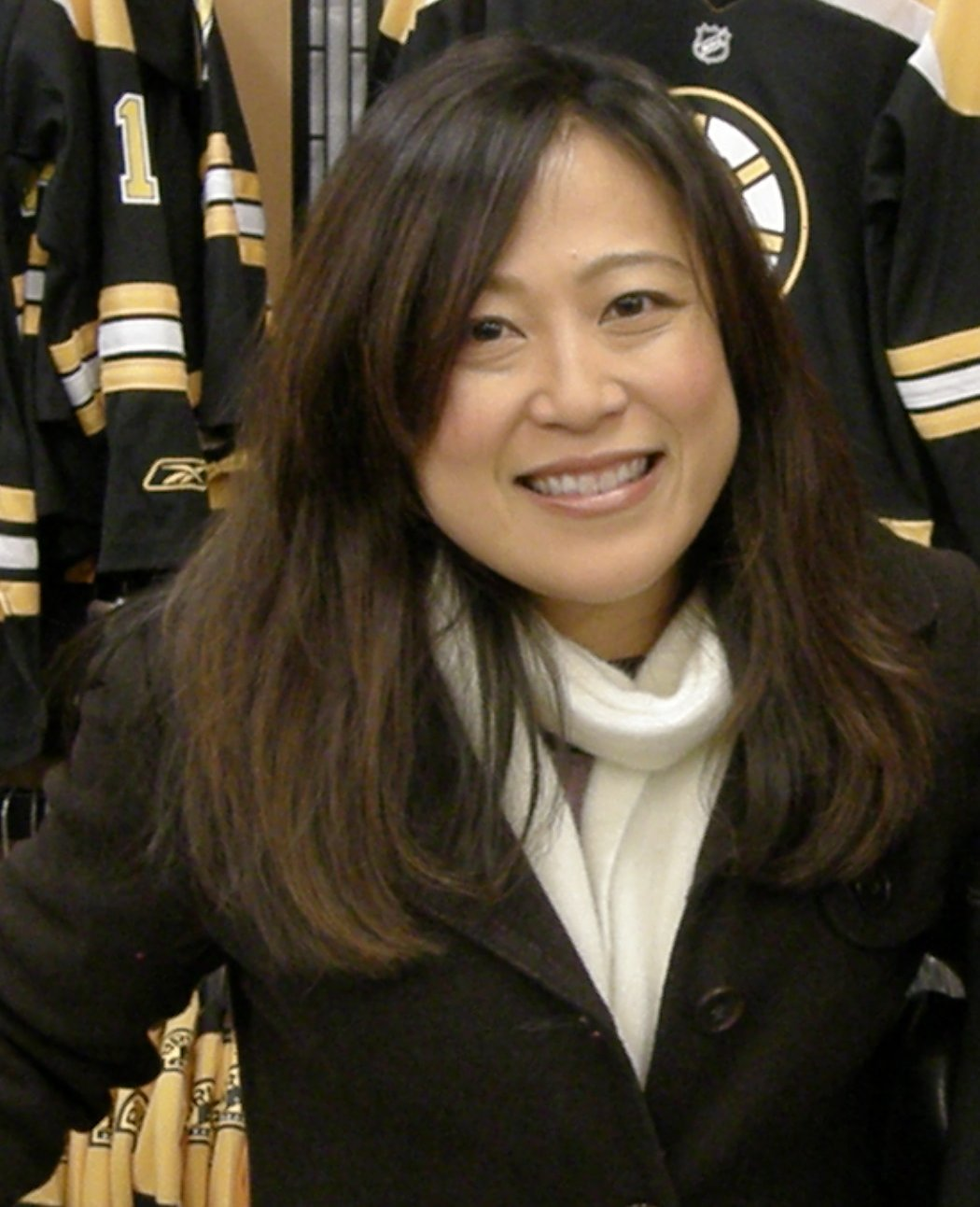
Naoko Funayama.

Naoko Funayama (Japanese: 船山直子, Funayama Naoko) is a Japanese American sportscaster, who currently works for the New England Revolution. She previously served as a rinkside reporter for Boston Bruins games on New England Sports Network.

== Career ==
A graduate of Williams College and the Boston University College of Communication, Funayama got her start at Adelphia Cable 10 in Frederick, Maryland. In August 2004, she joined WMUR-TV as a sports reporter, producer and anchor.

Funayama joined NESN as a freelance Boston Red Sox reporter in April 2007. In her first year with NESN, she covered Red Sox pitchers Daisuke Matsuzaka and Hideki Okajima. Funayama captured the attention of NESN after she helped Matsuzaka's struggling translator during Matsuzaka's introductory press conference.

Funayama joined NESN full-time in September 2008 as the Bruins in-game reporter and host of The Buzz, a Bruins countdown show formerly hosted by Hazel Mae. In June 2013, NESN announced that they would not renew Funayama's contract. She was replaced by Jamie Erdahl.

Funayama worked as a reporter for NBC Sports at the 2020 Summer Olympics then again for the 2026 Winter Olympics.

Funayama can currently be seen on NBC Sports Boston (formerly Comcast Sportsnet New England) and freelancing at WMUR-TV.
