= Frank Ryan (sportscaster) =

Francis Joseph "Frank" Ryan (1899–December 30, 1961) was an American public relations executive and sports announcer who was the first play-by-play announcer for the Boston Bruins and publicity director for the Bruins, Harvard University, and Suffolk Downs.

== Early life and education ==
Ryan was born in Boston in 1899. He attended Boston Latin School, where he was a member of the school's crew and hockey team and was captain of the football team. He graduated in 1917. During World War I, Ryan served as an officer in the United States Army Reserve. Ryan attended Boston College, but transferred to Harvard University, where he graduated with the class of 1924.

From 1919 to 1929, Ryan was a sports reporter for the Boston Traveler.

== Boston Bruins ==
When Charles Adams formed the Boston Bruins in 1924, he named Ryan as the team's broadcaster. Ryan called play-by-play for home games and recreated road games from telegraph reports. During intermissions, Ryan's brother-in-law would provide updates in French for French Canadians living in New England. In 1926, Ryan took on the additional role of public relations director. In 1948, when WBZ-TV began airing the third period of Bruins' home games, Ryan was chosen to handle the play-by-play duties. In 1950, he was elected to the team's board of directors. In 1952, the Bruins were purchased by the Boston Garden-Arena Corporation. As the corporation had its own publicity department, Ryan's position was eliminated. He was replaced as play-by-play announcer by Fred Cusick.

== Harvard University ==
In the fall of 1929, Ryan became the first ever publicity director of the Harvard athletic department. He instituted a number of reforms, including the construction of a new press box at Harvard Stadium, which resulted in the school receiving some of the best press coverage in the country. During his tenure at Harvard, Ryan supervised the announcement that Harvard had hired its first non-graduate football coach (Dick Harlow), helped guide Barry Wood during his standout collegiate career, and looked after Franklin Delano Roosevelt Jr. while he was a member of the football team. Ryan left Harvard in June 1939.

== Suffolk Downs ==
In February 1939, Ryan accepted a job at Suffolk Downs, which, like the Bruins, was owned by Charles Adams. He served as the track's vice president in charge of publicity until his resignation in 1950.

== Government work ==
During World War II, Ryan served as the acting regional information officer for the New England regional Office of Price Administration. In 1951 he became a public relations advisor for the New England Region of the Economic Stabilization Agency.

== Personal life and death ==
Ryan was a long-time resident of West Roxbury. He and his wife, Madeline, had two sons, and one daughter. One of his cousins, Torbert Macdonald, was a star football player at Harvard while Ryan was the school's publicity director.

Ryan died on December 30, 1961, at the Veterans Administration Hospital in Boston.
