= Billy Jaffe =

American sports journalist

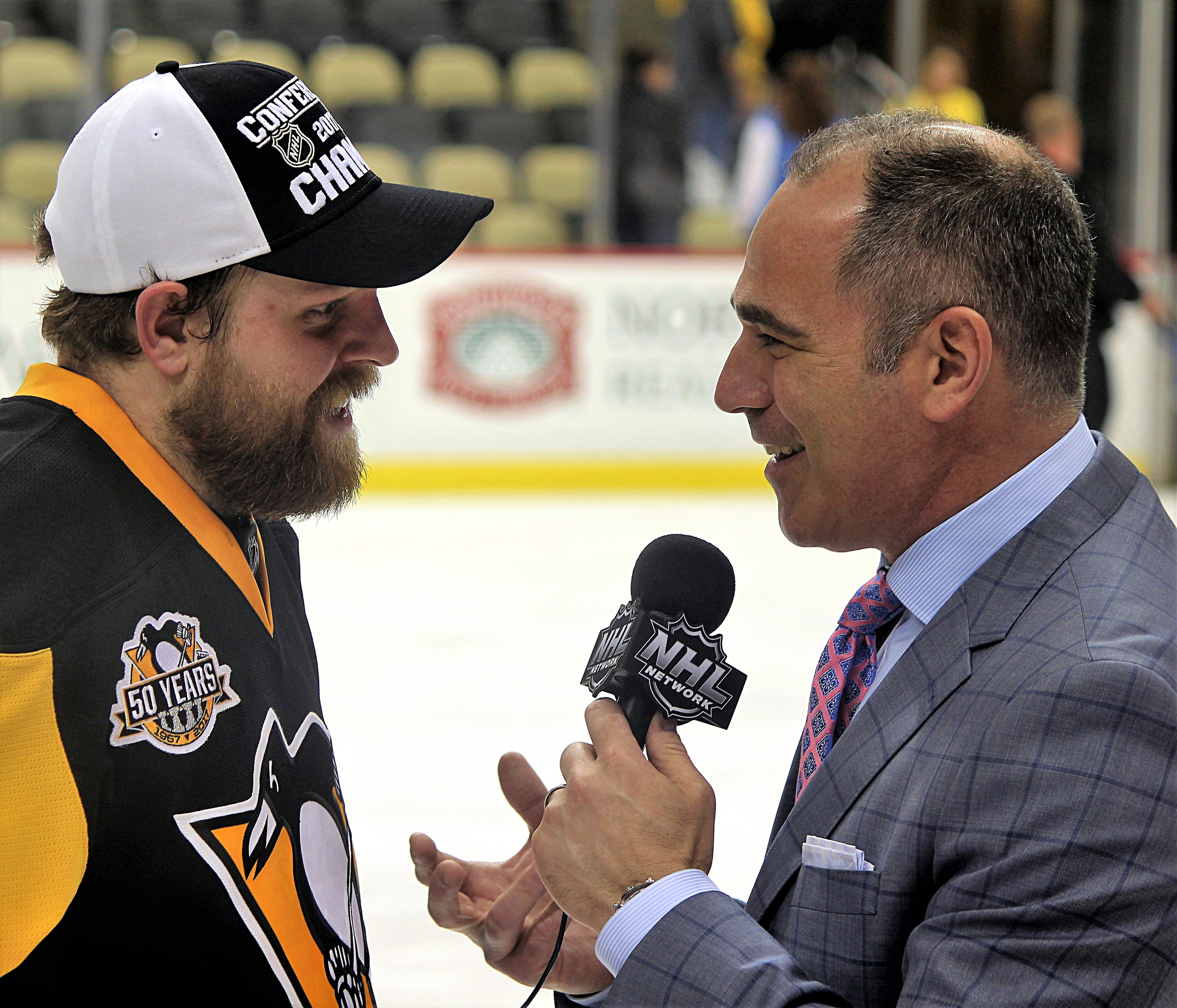
- Jaffe interviewing Phil Kessel following the Penguins victory in the 2017 Eastern Conference Final.
- Born: April 2, 1969 (age 57)
- Education: University of Michigan
- Occupations: Sportscaster, color analyst
- Spouse: Victoria Jaffe
- Children: Julia Jaffe and Jake Jaffe

Billy Jaffe (born April 2, 1969) is an on-air ice hockey analyst for NESN who provides commentary for pre-game, post-game and intermission shows during Boston Bruins games. Jaffe also served as a hockey analyst for Sportsnet, and for select coverage by NHL Network. He was formerly a color analyst for the New York Islanders on MSG Plus, as well as a color analyst and reporter for nationally televised hockey games on Versus.

== Early life ==
Jaffe graduated from Kent School in Kent, Connecticut in 1987.

== Playing career ==
Jaffe played hockey for the University of Michigan from 1987–1989 as a right wing. He has also served as team-captain for the silver medal winning team USA at the 1997 Maccabiah Games held in Israel.

== Broadcasting career ==
Jaffe began his broadcasting career as an analyst on the pre-game, intermission and post-game radio show for the Chicago Blackhawks during the 1998–99 season. After spending the 1999–2000 season as the Radio and Television Analyst for the Chicago Wolves of the International Hockey League, he joined the Atlanta Thrashers in September 2000. During his tenure with the Thrashers, he served primarily as the radio analyst, but also contributed to the Thrashers television coverage.

In addition to his work with the Thrashers, in October 2001, Jaffe served as color commentator for Fox Sports Net's coverage of the Cold War game between the University of Michigan and Michigan State which took place in outdoor Spartan Stadium on the Michigan State Campus. Jaffe took on another role acting as lead analyst for CSTV's Friday Night Hockey game of the week. He also served as a fill-in host on the Atlanta Braves studio show on TBS Superstation.

In 2006, Jaffe replaced Joe Micheletti, who moved on to the New York Rangers booth, as New York Islanders color analyst alongside Howie Rose. He works for NHL on Versus as an analyst and reporter during regular season and playoff broadcasts.

He worked on Versus for 5 years, building a strong reputation around the NHL and with fans, adding work with VERSUS.

Jaffe joined NESN for the 2010-11 Bruins season, working select games as an in-studio analyst on a part-time basis. For the 2013-14 season, Jaffe relocated to Boston and is slated to work at least 50 Bruins games for the network. Jaffe currently is working as a studio analyst, appearing across NHL Network programming.
