= Amy Stone =

American television personality

Amy Stone is a former American television personality who worked for New England Sports Network, WMAQ-TV, and WCBS-TV.

== Early life and career ==
A native of Michigan, Stone graduated from the University of Michigan in 1989 with degrees in communications and film. Stone began her career as a producer at WDIV-TV in Detroit, in June 1989. In September 1990, she received her first on-camera position as a weekend news anchor for WLUC-TV in Marquette, Michigan.

== NESN ==
In March 1991, Stone joined New England Sports Network (NESN), where she was the first host of SportsDesk. In 1993 she became the on-site reporter for Boston Red Sox and Boston Bruins games. She also served as a substitute host on Sports Digest and the Red Sox pregame show

== Chicago ==
After Stone's husband accepted a job in Chicago, she began to look for a job there. In 1994 she was hired by CLTV. One year later she joined SportsChannel Chicago. By 1997, SportsChannel planned to showcase Stone as a studio host. However, during a round of staff cutbacks, Stone decided to pursue other opportunities. She did not look at any network jobs, as they required extensive travel and Stone had a fear of flying. She accepted an offer to work as a weekday sports reporter and fill-in sports anchor at WMAQ-TV. At the time of her hiring, Stone was the only female sports reporter on a "Big Three" affiliate in Chicago, the only one on a network affiliate in the top five metropolitan areas (New York, Los Angeles, Chicago, Philadelphia, and the San Francisco Bay Area), and only one of three in the top ten television markets.

== WCBS ==
In May 2000, Stone joined WCBS-TV in New York City as a lifestyles reporter. Stone left WCBS in May 2005 after the birth of her second child.
