= Tom Larson (sportscaster) =

American sportscaster (1939–2023)

- Born: Lanny Lee Larason; January 30, 1939; Webster Groves, Missouri, U.S.
- Died: November 22, 2023 (aged 84); Fredericksburg, Virginia, U.S.
- Occupation: Sportscaster
- Years active: 1960–2007
- Known for: Boston Bruins broadcasts on WSBK-TV and NESN

Lanny Lee Larason (January 30, 1939 – November 22, 2023), known professionally as Tom Larson, was an American sportscaster and television host who worked in Boston from 1969 to 2007 and was the longtime host of Boston Bruins broadcasts on WSBK-TV and NESN.

== Early years ==
Lanny Lee Larason was born and raised in Webster Groves, Missouri, where one of his friends was another future sportscaster, Skip Caray. He began his broadcasting career in 1960 as a junior at Westminster College. After college, Larason worked in Bloomington, Illinois, Peoria, Illinois, and Lansing, Michigan.

== Career in Boston ==
In 1969, he was hired by WSBK-TV general manager Bill Flynn, who was looking for someone with a background in sports who could also host a public affairs talk show. Upon moving to Boston, Larason adopted the name "Tom Larson". During his tenure at WSBK, Larson hosted a daily talk show, hosted the post-game shows for the Boston Bruins and the Boston Red Sox, and served as the station's public affairs director. In 1985, Larson was replaced on Bruins games on TV 38 by Sean McDonough.

From 1981 to 1988, Larson was also the sports director at WHDH radio, doing sports reports during Jess Cain's morning show. In 1983, he was recognized as the best TV sportscaster in Boston, by Boston magazine.

In 1986, Larson joined the New England Sports Network, where he served as the studio host for Red Sox and Bruins games, wrote, produced, and reported for Front Row and a number of special presentations, and was a play-by-play announcer for college and high school sports.

Larson retired from broadcasting in 2007. In 1981, Larson had promised to shave his beard if the Bruins won the Stanley Cup; he shaved his beard 30 years later after the Bruins defeated the Vancouver Canucks the 2011 Stanley Cup Finals.

A former resident of Norwell, Massachusetts, Larson spent his later years in Fredericksburg, Virginia. He died from complications of cancer on November 22, 2023, at the age of 84.
