= Leo Egan =

American journalist

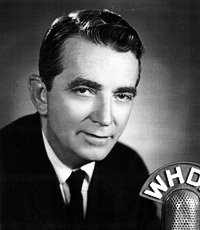
Egan in 1948

Leo Egan (April 19, 1914 – July 10, 2000) was an American sportscaster and news announcer.

== Biography ==
A native of Buffalo, New York, Egan replaced Ted Husing as the radio announcer for Harvard football games after Husing was barred from Harvard Stadium for referring to the play of quarterback Barry Wood as “putrid”. From 1946 to 1973, Egan worked for WBZ and WHDH radio, where he called Boston Red Sox, Boston Braves, and Boston Bruins games. Egan was the first baseball announcer to call a game live from an opposing team's ballpark; calling a Red Sox game from Cleveland Municipal Stadium in 1948. During the 1955–56 season he called Boston Celtics games on WBZ-TV. At WHDH, he spent years covering the morning drive-time news shift and playing the straight man to Jess Cain. On November 22, 1963, Egan broke into air time to announce that President John F. Kennedy had been assassinated. In 1970, Egan briefly returned to the Red Sox booth when regular announcers Ken Coleman, Ned Martin, and Johnny Pesky refused to cross the picket line of WHDH-TV's electrical workers.

Egan's final program at WHDH was Voice of Sports, a daily sports talk show. When the station came under new ownership, the program was canceled due to low ratings and Egan was fired. He then served as vice president and part owner of the Boston Astros of the American Soccer League. After his retirement, Egan lived in Duxbury, Massachusetts and Kingston, Massachusetts. He was a part-time dispatcher for the Duxbury Fire Department and covered high school sports and wrote a column for the Duxbury Clipper.

Egan died on July 10, 2000, at Jordan Hospital in Plymouth, Massachusetts.
