= Dawn Mitchell =

American sportscaster

Dawn Mitchell is an American sportscaster who has worked as a sports anchor and reporter for KMSP-TV in Minneapolis since 2004. She Is a four time Emmy winner. A graduate of Boston College, Mitchell began her career at NESN, where she was an Anchor for SportsDesk as well as an Emmy Award–winning studio host for Boston Bruins games. She also worked as a sports reporter and anchor for WDJT-TV and CLTV. Mitchell also did sideline Vikings reporting for NFL on Fox.
