= Bill Harrington (broadcaster) =

American sportscaster (1925–1998)

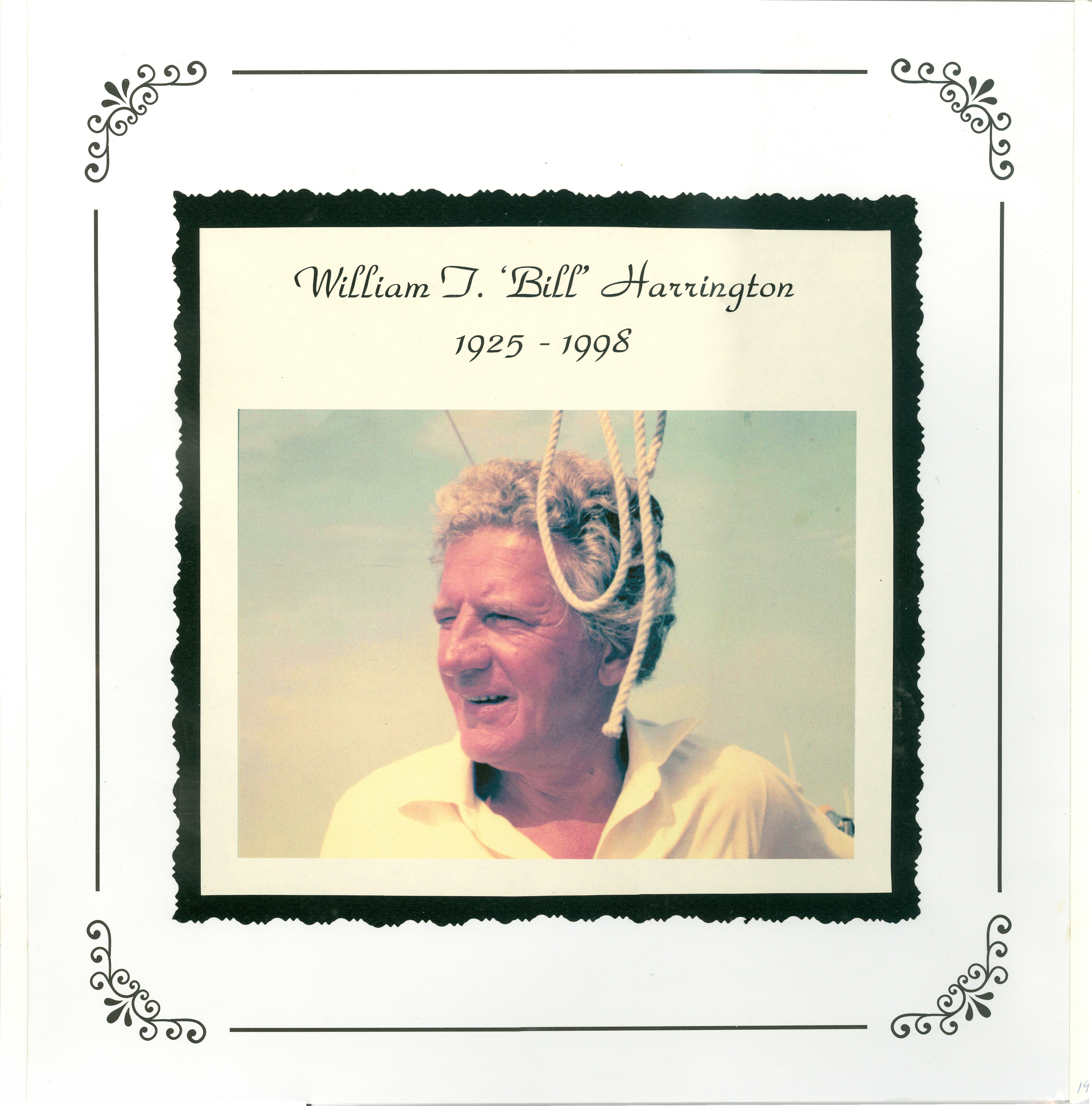
- Born: William T. Harrington; September 29, 1925; Lynn, Massachusetts, United States
- Died: February 14, 1998 (aged 72); Boston, Massachusetts, United States
- Education: Boston University
- Occupations: Sportcaster; children's television host; news reporters

William T. Harrington (September 29, 1925 – February 14, 1998) was an American sportscaster, children's television host, and news reporter for WHDH radio and WCVB-TV in Boston.

== Early life ==
A native of Lynn, Massachusetts, Harrington began his performing career at the age of 7 as an actor in summer stock theater. He appeared on stage with Helen Hayes, May Whitty, and Edward Everett Horton. His performances with the North Shore Players led to radio work while still a student at Lynn English High School. He graduated from Boston University. and served in the United States Merchant Marine during World War II and was a broadcaster with Armed Forces Radio.

== Career ==
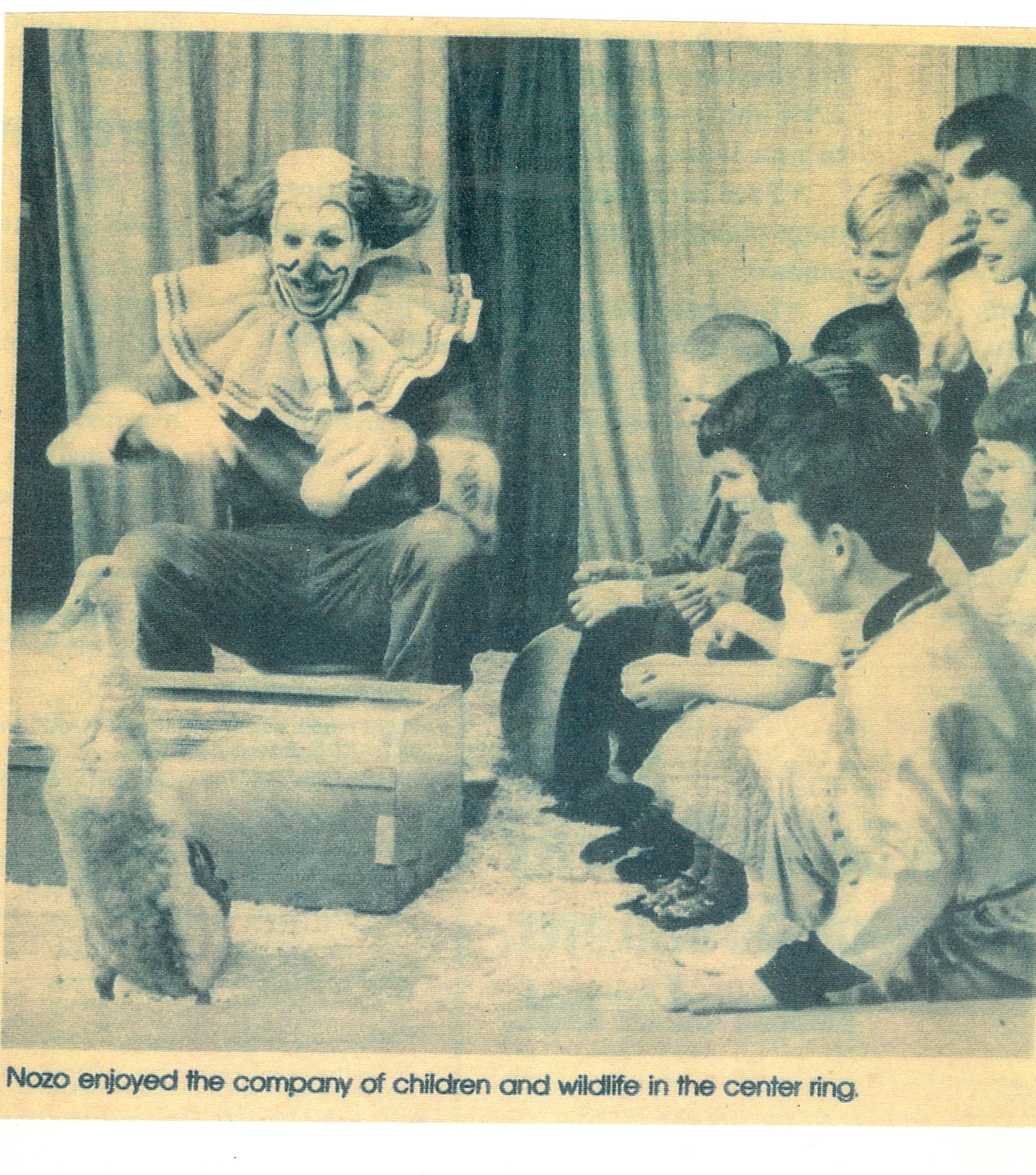
Nozo

In 1960, Harrington was hired by WHDH-TV to play Commander Jet on Commander Jet's Comedy. He also played Nozo the Clown, the brother of Bozo the Clown. Nozo filled in for Bozo when Frank Avruch was unable to appear on the show.

Harrington was a sportscaster at WHDH radio during the 1960s. He was Johnny Most's color commentator on Boston Celtics games and the radio play-by-play announcer for the Boston Bruins 1961–1965.

He worked as a news reporter and state house correspondent for WHDH radio, WHDH-TV and WCVB-TV during the 1960s, 1970s, and 1980s.

On December 29, 1981, Harrington was suspended by WCVB-TV for promoting legislative changes in the state's auto insurance system as a public relations consultant for the Westchester Group, an insurance firm. On January 12, 1983, the station fired Harrington for violating it's conflict of interest code. Harrington appealed his dismissal in court and the two sides reached a settlement on July 13, 1982.

Soon after his departure from WCVB-TV, Harrington was hired as a public relations consultant by Massport interim executive director Kenneth C. Pearson. He also served as a media consultant to Speaker Thomas W. McGee. He remained a media consultant and partner in the Westchester Group until his death on February 14, 1998.

== Personal life ==
In 1956, he married fellow Boston television personality Jean Dallaire, who subsequently played Miss Jean on the Boston version of Romper Room. He later married journalist Helen Woodman who was the owner and editor of the State House News Service in Boston, Massachusetts.
