= Dave Goucher =

American sportscaster

Dave Goucher is an American sportscaster who currently is the television play-by-play voice announcer for the Vegas Golden Knights on AT&T SportsNet Rocky Mountain and later on Scripps Sports.

Goucher worked the Stanley Cup Playoffs for TNT in 2022.

A 1993 graduate of Boston University, Goucher began his broadcasting career at BU, calling two seasons of Terrier hockey including the Beanpot, the Hockey East Championships, and the 1993 NCAA Frozen Four. He was the radio and television voice of the Wheeling Thunderbirds of the East Coast Hockey League from 1993-95. From 1995-2000, he was the radio voice of the Providence Bruins and was at the mic when the Bruins won the 1999 Calder Cup Finals. Goucher was also part of NESN's hockey coverage calling Providence Bruins and Eastern College Athletic Conference hockey.

== Broadcasting career ==
=== Boston Bruins ===
Goucher was the Boston Bruins radio play-by-play announcer from 2000-2017. He was named New England’s top radio play-by-play announcer by the Associated Press three times (2003, 2006, & 2007) and won the AP "Best Sportscast" award in 2006. He has also called games for NHL Radio's "Game of the Week" on Westwood One. In 2003, Goucher called Game 7 of the Western Conference playoff series between the St. Louis Blues and Vancouver Canucks.

=== Vegas Golden Knights ===
In 2017, their inaugural season, Goucher was hired to be the Vegas Golden Knights play-by-play announcer. He is currently paired with Shane Hnidy, Ashali Vise, Jamie Hersch, and Daren Millard.

=== Additional sports ===
Goucher has also covered the 2004 Major League Baseball playoffs, Super Bowl XXXIX, and the 2005 Red Sox championship ring ceremony for WBZ radio. He was also WBZ's play-by-play announcer for the Boston Marathon.
