= Dale Arnold =

American sportscaster

- Born: March 27, 1956 (age 70)
- Education: Bowdoin College
- Spouse: Susan Arnold
- Children: 1 son, 2 daughters
- Sports commentary career
- Teams: Boston Bruins, Boston Celtics, Boston Red Sox, New England Patriots, New England Revolution, Boston College Eagles football
- Genres: Anchoring pregame, intermission and postgame coverage
- Sports: Hockey, Football, Baseball, Basketball, Soccer, and Wrestling

Dale Everett Arnold (born March 27, 1956) is a New England sportscaster. He co-hosted talk radio shows on WEEI and WEEI-FM from 1991 until his retirement from radio in March 2021. He has served as the play-by-play announcer for the Boston Bruins and has called Boston College Eagles football. He is the only person to have done play-by-play broadcasts for all five of the Boston area's major professional sports franchises. In November 2024, Arnold came out of retirement to serve as a studio host for Bruins broadcasts on NESN on an interim basis.

== Career ==
A Bowdoin College alumnus, Arnold began calling games for the school teams while a student there in the mid-1970s. In 1979, he succeeded Mike Emrick as the voice of the Maine Mariners. He joined the New Jersey Devils with Emrick as their radio announcer in 1986, before returning to New England two years later. Arnold called New England Patriots games from 1988 to 1990 and provided play-by-play coverage for Bruins home games from 1995 to 2007, 9 of which came alongside Gord Kluzak. A notable call from Arnold as a play-by-play announcer came in a 1988 game at Sullivan Stadium between the Patriots and the Indianapolis Colts when Doug Flutie ran in the winning touchdown in the final 30 seconds; the crowd erupted, and Arnold described the scene as "This place has gone icky balooky!" In July 2007, Arnold was replaced by former ESPN sportscaster Jack Edwards as the Bruins' play-by-play announcer.

Arnold joined WEEI radio at its inception in 1991, at as AM station broadcasting at 590 kHz, then as Sportsradio 850, then moving to WEEI-FM with other locally produced programs. He first hosted a late-morning show from 10 AM to 1 PM, before being teamed up with Eddie Andelman on a show called The A-Team. After Andelman's departure from WEEI in 2001, Arnold was paired with former television sportscaster Bob Neumeier on the Dale & Neumy Show. After Neumeier left the station in 2005, Arnold paired with former Boston Globe columnist Michael Holley on The Dale & Holley Show from 10 AM to 2 PM.

On February 11, 2008, Entercom put Arnold on the four-person Boston Red Sox radio broadcast team, working with Joe Castiglione when Dave O'Brien was on ESPN. In February 2011, WEEI shifted Arnold to weekend duty while Holley became co-host of the Big Show during afternoon drive time. Arnold subsequently hosted a Sunday morning talk show on WEEI with Steve Buckley. In the 2011–12 season, Arnold returned to NESN as the in-studio host for Bruins broadcasts, anchoring pregame, intermission and postgame coverage.

On April 1, 2014, WEEI-FM relaunched The Dale & Holley Show from 2-6 PM. Arnold worked without a contract but, after the show's Nielsen ratings improved 59 percent, he was given a multi-year contract in January 2015. From November 2014 to November 2016, Jerry Thornton of Barstool Sports was added as the third host and comedian. He would later return to Barstool Sports full-time. Veteran radio host Rich Keefe of WBZ-FM and #DORK Podcast was hired to replace Thornton. Daily and weekly guests of The Dale & Holley with Keefe Show included Terry Francona, Mike Milbury, Bill Belichick, Michael Irvin, Peter King, Patrick Chung, Matthew Slater, Dont'a Hightower, Vince Wilfork, Chris Mannix, Jackie MacMullan, Trent Dilfer, and Pierre McGuire.

On February 28, 2018, the show was renamed The Dale & Keefe Show after longtime co-host Michael Holley announced at the 5 o'clock hour that he would be leaving WEEI immediately after the show to pursue a full-time television position with NBC Sports Boston. It was an emotional time for Arnold and Holley, having spent 10 years together as radio partners and best friends on and off the air. Holley is a close family friend of the Arnold family and attended Dale's son Taylor's wedding in New Orleans in October 2015. On August 13, 2018, WEEI shook up their lineup, moving The Dale & Keefe Show to the midday slot, and moving the midday show, Ordway, Merloni, and Fauria, featuring hosts Glenn Ordway, Lou Merloni, and Christian Fauria, to the afternoon drive time slot.

Arnold's voice can be heard during several NFL Top 10 and A Football Life documentaries on the NFL Network.

Arnold announced on March 11, 2021, that the following day's broadcast, on March 12, would be his last. Arnold worked nearly 30 years at WEEI, and continued hosting Bruins broadcasts on a part time basis. He then retired for good on April 11, 2023.

In November 2024, NESN announced that Arnold would return, on an interim basis, to handle studio duties for Boston Bruins pregame and postgame shows, to help balance the workload of other on-air staff members.

In March 2025, it was announced that Arnold would be inducted to the Massachusetts Broadcasters Hall of Fame in June 2025.

== Personal life ==
Arnold formerly of Bellingham, Massachusetts, now lives in Brunswick, Maine with his wife, Susan. They have three children: Taylor, Alysha, and Brianna. Arnold grew up in Maine and Minnesota prior to attending Bowdoin College. His son, Taylor Arnold, is a professor at the University of Richmond.

Preceded by Curt Gowdy	New England Patriots Play by Play announcer 1988–1990	Succeeded by Gil Santos
Preceded by Gil Santos	Boston College Eagles football Play by Play; 1992	Succeeded by Dick Lutsk
Preceded by Fred Cusick	Boston Bruins Television Play by Play announcer (home Games); 1995-2007	Succeeded by Jack Edwards
