= Don Earle =

American sportscaster (1929–1993)

Donald Earle Clement (March 29, 1929 – December 12, 1993) was an American ice hockey announcer for the Boston Bruins and Philadelphia Flyers of the National Hockey League.

Earle was born Donald Earle Clement in Somerville, Massachusetts. He graduated from Dedham High School in Dedham, Massachusetts. He served in the United States Coast Guard from 1949 to 1951 and was a journalist. He graduated from Grahm Junior College in 1954. He began his broadcasting career with WBET in Brockton, Massachusetts and later worked for another Brockton station - WOKW. He then moved to WKOX in Framingham, Massachusetts, where he called high school hockey games.

In 1967, Earle was chosen from relative obscurity to become WSBK-TV's announcer for Boston Bruins games. He called Bruins games during one of the club's most successful periods, which included winning the 1970 Stanley Cup Finals. Due to the team's success and the high number of games aired on WSBK, Earle became a high-profile sportscaster in Boston, however, according to Jack Craig of The Boston Globe, he was also the most criticized. In 1971, Earle was loudly booed by Bruins fans while presenting Channel 38's 7th Player Award. He was let go by WSBK-TV at the end of the season. From 1971 to 1977, Earle served as a second play by play announcer/analyst with the Philadelphia Flyers on WTAF alongside Gene Hart.

After his dismissal from the Flyers, Earle worked as a freelance sportscaster, calling games for the Colorado Rockies and the North American Soccer League. He returned to Massachusetts in 1981. From 1982 to 1985, he was a sports anchor for WGGB-TV in Springfield, Massachusetts. Earle spent his later years in Westfield, Massachusetts. He died on December 12, 1993.
