= Jack Edwards (sportscaster) =

American sportscaster and television commentator

- Edwards in 2006
- Born: March 1957 (age 69); Illinois, U.S.
- Education: University of New Hampshire
- Years active: 1980s–2024
- Spouse: Lisa Kraus
- Sports commentary career
- Teams: Chicago Fire (2003); Boston Bruins (2005–2024)
- Genre: Play-by-play
- Sports: Ice hockey, association football
- Employer: ESPN (1991–2003); FSN Chicago (2003); NESN (2005–2024)

Jack Edwards (born March 1957) is an American former sports commentator and reporter. From 2005 to 2024, he provided play-by-play commentary for Boston Bruins games on NESN television. From 1991 to 2003, he worked for ESPN as an anchor for their sports news program SportsCenter, as well as a play-by-play commentator for their NHL, MLS, Little League Baseball, and 2002 FIFA World Cup broadcasts. Edwards provided commentary for the Konami soccer video game MLS Extra Time 2002.

== Broadcasting career ==
=== Early career ===
Edwards started as a play-by-play announcer for the University of New Hampshire hockey team. He then moved on to play-by-play and sports anchor positions at WGIR radio and WMUR-TV in Manchester, New Hampshire. During the early 1980s, he worked as a talk radio host for WRKO in Boston and as a weekend anchor at WJAR-TV in Providence. He then moved to a sports reporter position at WCVB-TV in Boston. While at WCVB-TV, Edwards also served as a freelance play by play announcer for ESPN. Among the events he called were the Davis Cup finals and Frozen Four. He also served as a reporter for ABC's coverage of alpine skiing at the 1988 Winter Olympics.

In 1988, Edwards became the weekend sports anchor for Boston's WNEV-TV/WHDH-TV. While working for the then-CBS affiliate, Edwards also called some events for the network, including the US Open and the 1991 Olympic Winterfest.

=== ESPN ===
In 1991, Edwards joined ESPN as a SportsCenter anchor and reporter. Edwards also did announcing for Little League baseball from 1995 to 2002, the X Games in 1996, ESPN National Hockey Night in 1993 as alternate host and announcing from 1999 to 2003, and soccer, including coverage of the 2002 FIFA World Cup.

=== Post-ESPN ===
In 2003, Edwards joined College Sports Television, a newly launched speciality cable sports channel. Edwards also became play-by-play announcer for Chicago Fire soccer broadcasts on Fox Sports Net Chicago.

==== Boston Bruins ====
Edwards began calling Boston Bruins games during the 2005–06 NHL season for NESN, handling the road games while Dale Arnold covered the home games. At the start of the 2007–08 NHL season, Edwards began calling all Bruins games alongside his longtime broadcast partner Andy Brickley. He received a 2011 Stanley Cup Championship ring for his play-by-play work with the Bruins.

Edwards became known for his enthusiasm and colorful delivery. His calls like “high above the ice”, “tumbling muffin” and “Chinese mustard” became well known among Bruins fans.

Edwards announced on April 16, 2024, that he would retire from broadcasting following the first round of the 2024 Stanley Cup playoffs. He called his final game on May 2, 2024, a Game 6 loss against the Toronto Maple Leafs; rights to broadcasting Game 7 were held exclusively by ABC/ESPN+. His final game came one day after that of longtime Boston Celtics play-by-play commentator Mike Gorman, who also announced his retirement prior to the Celtics' 2023–24 season.

== Personal life ==
Edwards is married to Lisa Kraus. They live in Simsbury, Connecticut. Edwards began seeking speech therapy in the early 2020s as a result of slowed speech, which became particularly noticeable during Edwards' play-by-play commentary. Since retiring Edwards has become an avid skier and still regularly attends Bruins games.

== Tribute and honors ==
Prior to the Bruins 2024 regular season finale, the team held a special ceremony in Edwards honor, playing a video montage with some of his most iconic calls and moments as Edwards stood at center ice. He was then presented with a golden stick that he raised above his head, receiving a standing ovation from the fans in attendance. The Bruins also unveiled a mural in the broadcasting booth Edwards shared with color analyst Andy Brickley that reads “From high above the ice,” which was Edwards’ signature opening during broadcasts.

Bruins CEO Charlie Jacobs, stated “Jack’s voice has been the soundtrack for generations of Bruins fans that have experienced so many incredible moments. His presence has been felt around the globe and he will forever be a part of the Bruins legacy.”

=== Awards and nominations ===
In 1991 while working as an anchor and reporter for SportsCenter, Edward’s won a Sports Emmy Award for his ESPN reporting.

New England Emmy Awards
Year	Category	Nominated work	Role	Result
2008	Sporting Event / Game Live / Unedited	Boston Bruins Hockey (shared)	Play by play	Nominated
2013	Sporting Event / Game Live / Unedited	Bruins vs. Maples Leafs Game 7 (shared)	Play by play	Nominated
2015	Sporting Event / Game Live / Unedited	Bruins On NESN (shared)	Play by play	Nominated
2020	Writer Short Form	Bruins Stanley Cup Essay	Writer	Won
2020	Sports - One Time Special	Bergeron at 1,000 (shared)	Interview / writer	Won
2021	Sports - One Time Special	Chara at 1,000 (shared)	Host	Won
2023	Live Sporting Event / Game	Boston Bruins Broadcast (shared)	Play by play	Nominated

Media offices
Preceded by Phil Schoen	MLS Cup play-by-play announcer 2000–2001	Succeeded by JP Dellacamera
