= Barry Pederson =

Canadian ice hockey player (born 1961)

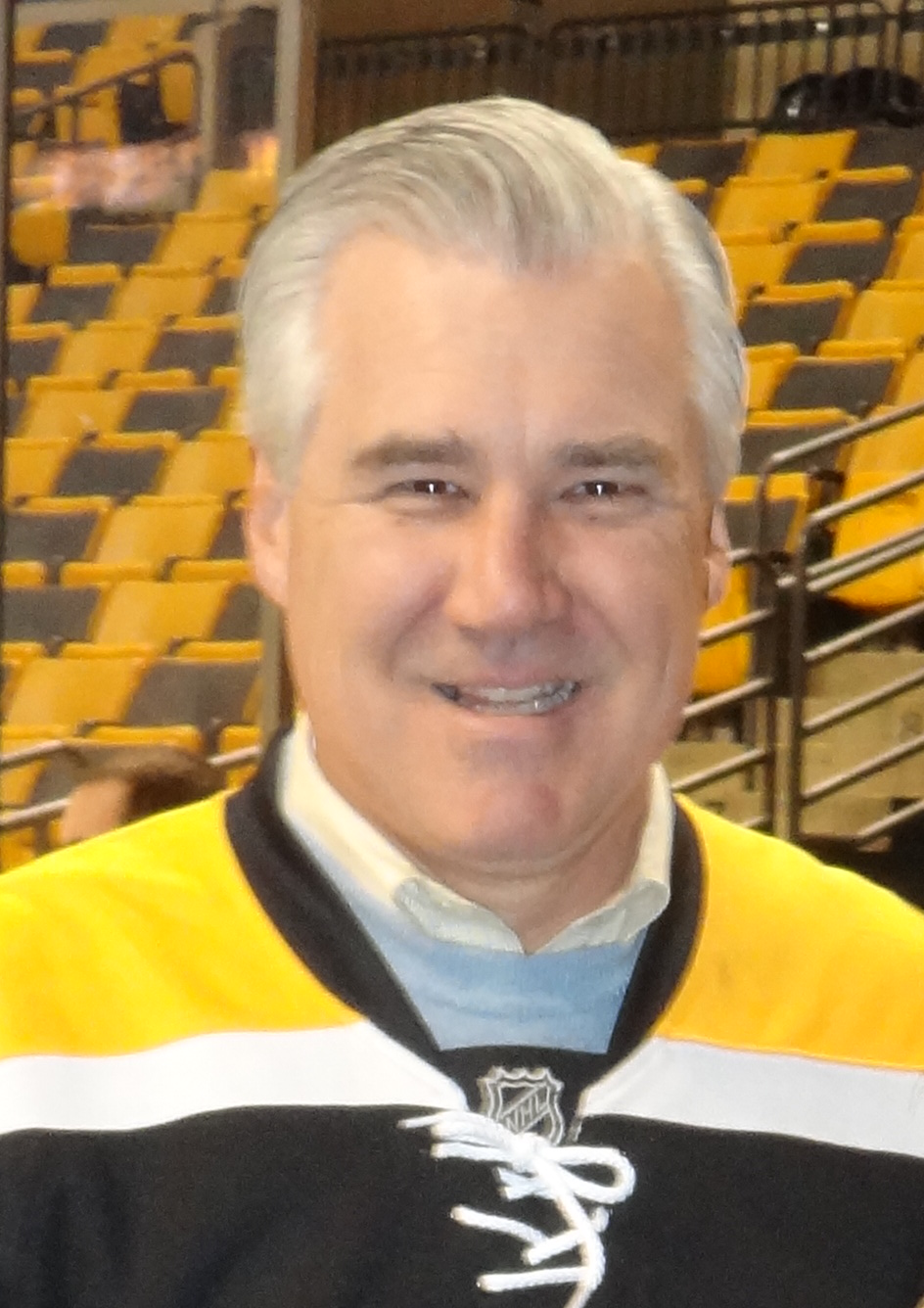
- Pederson in 2013
- Born: March 13, 1961 (age 65) Big River, Saskatchewan, Canada
- Height: 5 ft 11 in (180 cm)
- Weight: 185 lb (84 kg; 13 st 3 lb)
- Position: Centre
- Shot: Right
- Played for: Boston Bruins; Vancouver Canucks; Pittsburgh Penguins; Hartford Whalers
- National team: Canada
- NHL draft: 18th overall, 1980; Boston Bruins
- Playing career: 1980–1992

Barry Alan Pederson (born March 13, 1961) is a Canadian former professional ice hockey centre who played twelve seasons in the National Hockey League between 1980 and 1992. He finished second in NHL Awards Voting for Rookie of the Year in 1982 and was a two-time NHL All-Star. He won a Stanley Cup in 1991 with the Pittsburgh Penguins. In 34 Stanley Cup playoff games, he recorded 52 points for an average of 1.529, fourth best in NHL history.

== Playing career ==
Pederson began his junior hockey career playing for the Nanaimo Junior A Clippers. Moving up to the Victoria Cougars of the WHL, Pederson was then drafted in the first round (18th overall) by the Boston Bruins in the 1980 NHL entry draft. He would return for one more season in Victoria after being drafted, scoring 147 points in 55 games, and another five points in a nine-game stint in Boston.

He broke into the NHL in the 1981–82 season, setting Bruin rookie records for goals (44, which still stands) and points (92) and finishing runner-up to Dale Hawerchuk for the Calder Memorial Trophy as the league's top rookie. Included in his 92 points was a seven-point effort against the Hartford Whalers which also remains a Bruin rookie record. Pederson and star winger Rick Middleton had instant chemistry, and would be one of the league's most dangerous duos for several seasons.

In 1982–83, he finished with 46 goals and 107 points. He led the Bruins in assists and points, and finished fifth in league scoring (the only player in the top eight not to eventually make the Hockey Hall of Fame). In the playoffs, he would take his game to another level, as he and Middleton wreaked havoc combining for 65 points in just 17 games before losing out to New York Islanders in the Conference Final. Pederson finished third in playoff goals and points despite not reaching the finals.

Pederson continued his exploits in 1983–84, posting 39 goals and 77 assists for 116 points. His assist and point totals again led the Bruins, and his point total placed him sixth in the NHL. His 77 assists were third in the league behind only Wayne Gretzky and Paul Coffey. He played in his second consecutive NHL All-Star Game, and was selected to represent Canada at the 1984 Canada Cup tournament that summer.

At this point Pederson, despite being only 23, was on par with players such as Denis Savard, Michel Goulet, Ron Francis and Hawerchuk, all of whom went on to the Hall of Fame. However, his career would take a turn in the summer of 1984 when he was diagnosed with a benign tumor in his shoulder. He returned for only 22 games in the 1984–85 season, posting 12 points, before a second, more serious surgery had to be performed on the shoulder. This procedure required the removal of part of his shoulder muscle, and forced him to miss the remainder of the season.

Pederson returned to Boston's lineup for the 1985–86 season, but did not perform at the level he had prior to his injury. He finished the season with respectable totals of 29 goals and 76 points, good for fourth on the team but a 40-point drop from his last healthy year two seasons previous. At the conclusion of the season, Boston GM Harry Sinden, traded Pederson to Vancouver Canucks for Cam Neely and Vancouver's first round pick in the 1987 entry draft, which the Bruins used to select Glen Wesley.

For the 1986–87 season, he finished with 24 goals and a team-leading 52 assists for 76 points, and was named Canuck MVP by both the team's media and fans. In 1987–88, he again led the team in assists with 52, and added 19 goals for 71 points. He remains one of only four players in Canuck history (along with André Boudrias, Thomas Gradin and Henrik Sedin) to record consecutive 50-assist seasons.

In 1988–89, Pederson slumped to just 16 goals and 41 points while missing almost 20 games due to injury. Dogged by comparisons to Neely, the Canucks dealt him to the Pittsburgh Penguins 16 games into the 1989–90 season.

Pederson would continue to struggle in Pittsburgh, finishing the season with just 6 goals and 31 points in 54 games between the Canucks and Penguins. Now primarily a utility player, he appeared in just 46 games in 1990–91, but was a member of the Penguin team that won the Stanley Cup Championship that year.

Released by the Penguins that summer, he signed with the Whalers but was released after only five games. He would re-sign with the Bruins. At the end of the 1991–92 season, he retired at the age of 31.

=== Trade for Cam Neely ===
In the summer of 1986, Pederson was a valuable commodity. Still just 25, he was considered one of the best young centres in the game. He had already posted two 100-point seasons, and was only two years removed from finishing third in the NHL in assists and sixth in points. To the offense-starved Vancouver Canucks, who were the third-lowest scoring team in the league the previous year, he looked like a saviour and had the added attraction of being a 'local boy' - while originally from Saskatchewan, he had played his junior hockey nearby in Nanaimo and Victoria from the age of 15 onward.

However, Boston management were convinced that, despite Pederson's age, his best years were behind him as a result of two surgeries during the 1984–85 season to remove a tumour from his shoulder. On June 6, 1986, the Canucks signed Pederson as a restricted free agent. Cam Neely was left unprotected by Vancouver and went to the Bruins along with a first-round draft pick in the 1987 NHL entry draft as compensation for Pederson. The ninth overall pick in the 1983 NHL entry draft, Neely's development had stagnated and he finished the 1985–86 season with just 14 goals. However, Boston coveted his size and toughness, and considered him a potential heir apparent to Bruin players of the past such as Terry O'Reilly and Wayne Cashman.

Neely scored 36 goals in his first year in Boston. The next year he scored 42 and was named a second team All-Star. By the 1989–90 season, he was the most feared power forward in the game, as respected for his natural scoring touch as for his ferocious fighting ability. While Neely's career was cut short by injury, he still registered three 50-goal seasons and was inducted into the Hockey Hall of Fame in 2005. At the same time, Pederson had two solid seasons in Vancouver, but his career went into a spiral afterward, becoming a marginal NHL player by the time Vancouver dealt him away. He registered less than 100 points past the age of 27, and was out of the game by 1992. Vancouver's poor season following the deal turned the draft pick into the #3 overall selection in the 1987 NHL entry draft, with which the Bruins selected Glen Wesley who developed into an All-Star defender for the Bruins, who would go on to a 20-year career.

== Personal ==
Pederson was born in Big River, Saskatchewan and moved to Nanaimo, British Columbia, where he was raised.

Pederson and his wife Patricia have two children. The family resides in Swampscott, Massachusetts.

Pederson now serves as studio analyst for Bruins coverage for the New England Sports Network NESN and is a Financial Advisor for UBS Financial Services in Boston.

== Awards ==
- BCJHL (Coastal) Second All-Star Team – 1977–78
- WHL Second All-Star Team – 1979–80
- WHL First All-Star Team – 1980–81
- Seventh Player Award – 1982
- Bruins Three Stars Awards – 1982, 1984,
- NHL All-Star Game – 1983, 1984
- Stanley Cup Champion – 1991
- Named One of the Top 100 Best Bruins Players of all Time.

== Career statistics ==
=== Regular season and playoffs ===
			Regular season					Playoffs
Season	Team	League	GP	G	A	Pts	PIM	GP	G	A	Pts	PIM
1976–77	Nanaimo Clippers	BCHL	64	44	74	118	31	—	—	—	—	—
1977–78	Nanaimo Clippers	BCHL	63	51	102	153	68	—	—	—	—	—
1977–78	Victoria Cougars	WCHL	3	1	4	5	2	—	—	—	—	—
1978–79	Victoria Cougars	WHL	72	31	53	84	41	—	—	—	—	—
1979–80	Victoria Cougars	WHL	72	52	88	140	50	16	13	14	27	31
1980–81	Boston Bruins	NHL	9	1	4	5	6	—	—	—	—	—
1980–81	Victoria Cougars	WHL	55	65	82	147	65	15	15	21	36	10
1980–81	Victoria Cougars	MC	—	—	—	—	—	4	4	1	5	6
1981–82	Boston Bruins	NHL	80	44	48	92	53	11	7	11	18	2
1982–83	Boston Bruins	NHL	77	46	61	107	47	17	14	18	32	21
1983–84	Boston Bruins	NHL	80	39	77	116	64	3	0	1	1	2
1984–85	Boston Bruins	NHL	22	4	8	12	10	—	—	—	—	—
1985–86	Boston Bruins	NHL	79	29	47	76	60	3	1	0	1	0
1986–87	Vancouver Canucks	NHL	79	24	52	76	50	—	—	—	—	—
1987–88	Vancouver Canucks	NHL	76	19	52	71	92	—	—	—	—	—
1988–89	Vancouver Canucks	NHL	62	15	26	41	22	—	—	—	—	—
1989–90	Vancouver Canucks	NHL	16	2	7	9	10	—	—	—	—	—
1989–90	Pittsburgh Penguins	NHL	38	4	18	22	29	—	—	—	—	—
1990–91	Pittsburgh Penguins	NHL	46	6	8	14	21	—	—	—	—	—
1991–92	Hartford Whalers	NHL	5	2	2	4	0	—	—	—	—	—
1991–92	Boston Bruins	NHL	32	3	6	9	8	—	—	—	—	—
1991–92	Maine Mariners	AHL	14	5	13	18	6	—	—	—	—	—
NHL totals			701	238	416	654	472	34	22	30	52	25

=== International ===
Year	Team	Event	Result	GP	G	A	Pts	PIM
1987	Canada	WC	4th	10	2	3	5	2

== Transactions ==
- December 1984 – Missed majority of 1984-85 due to surgery to remove benign tumour from shoulder.
- June 6, 1986 – Traded to Vancouver by Boston for Cam Neely and Vancouver's first round choice (Glen Wesley) in 1987 Entry Draft.
- January 8, 1990 – Traded to Pittsburgh by Vancouver with Rod Buskas and Tony Tanti for Dave Capuano, Andrew McBain and Dan Quinn.
- September 5, 1991 – Signed as a free agent by Hartford.
- November 14, 1991 – Traded to Boston by Hartford for future considerations.

Preceded by Brad McCrimmon	Boston Bruins first-round draft pick 1980	Succeeded by Normand Leveille
