= Fred Cusick =

American sportscaster

- Born: Frederick Michael Cusick; November 7, 1918; Brighton, Massachusetts, U.S.
- Died: September 15, 2009 (aged 90); Barnstable, Massachusetts, U.S.
- Occupation: Former NHL broadcaster

Frederick Michael Cusick (November 7, 1918 – September 15, 2009) was an American ice hockey broadcaster who served as the Boston Bruins play-by-play announcer from 1971 until 1997 on WSBK-TV (Channel 38) in Boston, and from 1984 until 1995 on NESN. Counting his radio broadcasts, he was a Bruins' announcer for an unprecedented 45 years and was an active sports announcer for over seven decades. Cusick is best known for yelling "SCORE!" when a Boston player scored a goal.

== Biography ==
=== Early life and career ===
Fred Cusick was born in the Brighton section of Boston. A graduate of (and former hockey player at) Northeastern University in Boston, Cusick began broadcasting sports at WCOP in Boston in 1941 while a senior at Northeastern, crediting his hockey background as the entree to the position. He subsequently went into the United States Navy in World War II, rising to lieutenant in command of a subchaser. After the war, he worked for several radio stations, hosting the popular Irish Hour on WVOM in Brookline, which focused on sports, especially hockey. After a brief time in Washington during the Korean War and upon the retirement of Bruins' radio broadcaster Frank Ryan, Cusick – paired with ex-Bruin Jack Crawford – became the radio play-by-play broadcaster of the Bruins from 1952 to 1963, during which time he was also Sports Director for WEEI radio in Boston.

Cusick was the announcer for the first US network NHL broadcast (CBS-TV in January 1957); he spent four years in all working the NHL Game of the Week for CBS.

=== 1960s-1970s ===
Fred Cusick was the color commentator on WEEI for the very first game of the fledgling American Football League, a Friday night contest between the Denver Broncos and the Boston Patriots on September 9, 1960, at Nickerson Field on the campus of Boston University. He served as the color man for Patriots radio between 1960 and 1964. He also had a notable interview with golfing legend Francis Ouimet in 1963, on the fiftieth anniversary of Ouimet's 1913 U.S. Open victory. It is the only video interview of Ouimet in existence.

In the early 1960s, Cusick was responsible for getting Boston Bruins' games on local television regularly. In 1963, Bruins CEO Weston Adams asked Fred and producer/director Neal P. Cortel to arrange the first-ever live telecast of a Bruins game from the old Boston Garden. The experimental telecast was wildly popular, and later during the 1963/1964 season, Fred hosted the Sunday morning rebroadcasts of edited CBC Television tapes of Saturday night Bruins games in Montreal and Toronto; they were flown back overnight with the team, then seen first at 9 am on WMUR-TV in Manchester, New Hampshire, and WTEV-TV (now WLNE-TV) in the Providence/New Bedford market (the signal[s] of which covered some of the Boston areas), and then at 1 pm on the old WHDH-TV (now WCVB-TV) in Boston, WWLP-TV in Springfield, and WRLP-TV in Northampton. Fred's telecasts were enormously popular, and within a few years, games would be shown live on WKBG and later began a long run at WSBK-TV.

From 1969 through 1971, Cusick was the radio voice of the Boston Bruins on WBZ-AM 1030 (Bob Wilson replaced him on WBZ-AM starting in 1972) when they reached the pinnacle of their popularity, winning their first Stanley Cup in 29 years in 1970, and setting a regular-season record for points and goals scored in 1970–71. His broadcasting partners were former NHL players Johnny Peirson in 1969–70 and Cal Gardner in 1970–71.

In 1971, Cusick returned to TV, succeeding Don Earle, who had been hired by WSBK when they began covering the Boston Bruins, as play-by-play man for Bruins' games on WSBK with Peirson as his color man; when NESN was formed in 1984, he did double duty for 11 years, calling games for both channels, first with Johnny Peirson and later both Derek Sanderson and Dave Shea. In his last years before he retired from broadcasting the Bruins, he did games only on WSBK.

=== 1980s-1990s ===
Cusick was inducted into the Hockey Hall of Fame in the first wave of media honorees in 1984, and in that year was also named the first winner of the Foster Hewitt Memorial Award (along with Danny Gallivan, Rene Lecavalier and Hewitt himself), "in recognition of members of the radio and television industry who made outstanding contributions to their profession and the game during their career in hockey broadcasting." He has also won the Lester Patrick Trophy in 1988 for outstanding service to hockey in the United States.

It was Cusick who did the television play-by-play of the last Bruins' game at the old Boston Garden (a pre-season game against their rival Montreal in 1995) and the first Bruins' game in the FleetCenter, the 1995–96 season-opener against the New York Islanders, both with color commentator Derek Sanderson and studio host Sean McDonough and on WSBK.

=== 2000s ===
After retiring from the Bruins' broadcasts in 1997, Cusick began broadcasting home games for the AHL Lowell Lock Monsters with former Bruin Brad Park as his partner. He retired for good as a hockey sportscaster after the 2002 season at the age of 83.

In 2007, Cusick returned to the broadcast booth as the Cape Cod Baseball League game of the week play-by-play announcer on WBZ (AM) Radio.

His autobiography, Fred Cusick: Voice of the Bruins (ISBN 1-58261-981-6), was published in October 2006.

=== Death ===
Fred Cusick died in his sleep on September 15, 2009, at his home in Barnstable, Massachusetts, from complications of bladder cancer. The following day he was posthumously inducted into the Massachusetts Broadcasters Hall of Fame, an honor he had been scheduled to receive before his death.
