= Good Day! (TV program) =

American morning television program

- Opening title (1991)
- Presented by: John Willis; Janet Langhart; Mortisha Palmer; Ken Stahl; Meryl Comer; Michael Young; Eileen Prose; Brian Christie; Jim Caldwell; Tim White; Dr. Tom Cottle; Ted Reinstein
- Country of origin: United States
- Original language: English
- No. of seasons: 19

Production
- Camera setup: Multi-camera
- Running time: 90 minutes (1973-1982); 60 minutes (1982-1991)

Original release
- Network: WCVB/Boston syndication
- Release: September 24, 1973 – October 11, 1991

Related
- Good Morning America

Good Day! (originally known as Good Morning!, and alternately known in later years as The Good Day Show and Good Day! Live) is an American morning television program which aired from September 24, 1973, until October 11, 1991. Produced by WCVB-TV in Boston, Good Day! aired on that local ABC affiliate for its entire 18 years of production, airing in various timeslots (which changed throughout the years) between 9 and 11 a.m. on WCVB's morning schedule. The program was later syndicated to seventy-one American television markets, expanding its viewership beyond its primary New England viewer base.

Good Day! is credited for being one of the prototypes for ABC's Good Morning America, as its format, which combined news and information with talk and lifestyle features, was adopted by the subsequent national ABC morning television program, and eventually by its competitors on CBS, NBC, and on other networks.

The program has no relation to the current group of local morning shows produced by the Fox owned-and-operated television stations, all of which use the Good Day title.

== Synopsis ==
=== Early years ===
==== Launch, format, and original on-air staff ====
WCVB-TV, which had signed on the air one year before the premiere of Good Morning!, developed the show as a part of their effort to produce more local programming than any other network affiliate in the country. Bruce Marson, who had produced the first season of WGBH-TV's successful children's series Zoom, was hired by WCVB management to launch the new 90-minute live morning variety program they were creating.

Good Day!, which first premiered in 1973 as Good Morning!, was a morning variety program with light news features, but with an overall focus on interviews with celebrities and experts in particular fields, along with a regular amount of musical, dance and scripted theater performances. Interviews with politicians and other key newsmakers were also featured, often conducted right in WCVB's studios on the program's set, but sometimes done via satellite. The show would also conduct special segments, or entire broadcasts, outdoors at several different Boston-area events, with the hosts interacting with event participants—and the general public—as they staged their activities.

The original hosts of Good Morning! were John Willis, Janet Langhart and Mortisha Palmer. Ken Stahl was also a featured remote/on-location host during the first several years of the show. Longtime Boston TV personality Frank Avruch, who hosted several locally-produced shows at WCVB in addition to serving as the station's booth announcer, was a regular contributor on Good Morning!, hosting segments with a focus on arts and entertainment. After the first year, Palmer left the program, and it was the on-screen camaraderie of Willis and Langhart that became synonymous with the show.

For much of its run, Good Day! was broadcast live from a set that merged both a large, sweeping living room area with a sizeable kitchen, the latter of which was used very often for cooking segments. In the mid-to-late 1980s, the in-studio set came to resemble more of a giant, elegant-looking open foyer, with a kitchen island moved into the center for the cooking segments. Good Day! also broke ground by taking its entire production on the road and broadcasting from locations outside of the Boston area and around the world—a feat of which was considered exceptional for a locally produced program.

==== Additional broadcast markets and title change ====
For a few years beginning in the summer of 1974, WCVB made Good Morning! the cornerstone of their regional New England Network, a six-station link-up between WCVB and a handful of broadcast channels (spanning Rhode Island, Maine and Vermont) which all agreed to air a select amount of WCVB's locally produced shows. Good Morning! (briefly renamed Good Morning, New England!) continued to build on its early ratings success as a part of this network, with its reach now extending into Canadian markets.

In 1975, when ABC was looking to revamp its new morning talk and news program AM America, they sent network executives out to a few of the ABC affiliates to observe the production of their local morning programs. Good Morning! was among the few that were used as a case study for the AM America retooling, the other principal one being The Morning Exchange on WEWS-TV in Cleveland. ABC entertainment chief Fred Silverman ended up adopting features from both programs, and launched AM America's replacement, Good Morning America, in November 1975. Not long after the premiere of Good Morning America, WCVB station manager Bob Bennett confronted Silverman at an affiliate's convention and accused him of deliberately stealing the title of Good Morning!; the two similarly-titled programs were now running back-to-back on WCVB's morning lineup. No legal cease and desist action was finalized against ABC in the matter, however. Finally, after months of possible confusion between the two programs, the Boston-based Good Morning! changed its name to Good Day! on Monday, August 2, 1976, the same day that the program began to be syndicated to TV markets beyond New England.

=== Host changes ===
==== Exit Janet Langhart, enter Meryl Comer ====
In 1978, the first significant host changes took place on Good Day!. Janet Langhart left the program in June of that year, as she accepted NBC's offer to be the New York-based co-host on the network's new daytime talk program America Alive!. Ken Stahl also made his last appearance as a remote host that year. In searching for Langhart's replacement, the producers of Good Day! decided to hire John Willis' former co-host from WTTG-TV's Panorama program, Meryl Comer. There was much promotional fanfare of the pairing of Willis and Comer; despite solid chemistry on-screen between the two longtime friends and colleagues, ratings for Good Day! began to decline in the 1978-79 season. After one year as co-host, Comer returned to the Washington, DC market.

When Comer joined the show, Michael Young joined as a principal location host and studio host. During his tenure, Young began hosting the national Sunday morning series Kids Are People Too for ABC, replacing original host Bob McAllister. For his work on the ABC program, Young began commuting to New York City as well. Not long after, Young left WCVB and moved with Kids Are People Too to Hollywood.

==== Eileen Prose ====
During the Willis/Comer tenure, the producers brought in Eileen Prose as a substitute host. Prose, a former 1966 Miss America contestant, was a multi-talented television personality who brought her skills as a host, interviewer and singer to Good Day!. Her capacities helped so much that by August 1979, after Comer's departure, Prose was named permanent co-host.

==== Early 1980s ====
In 1980, after two years in New York, Janet Langhart returned to the program as a third co-host, alongside Willis and Prose. Coinciding with Langhart's return, the program adopted the modified title of The Good Day Show, which lasted during the 1980–81 season. This season also saw the arrival of Brian Christie as a correspondent and substitute host. Langhart left the show again at the close of that season when she was hired to be a field correspondent on the 1981 syndicated weekday revival of You Asked for It. Christie also departed during 1981. Willis and Prose then continued together as Good Day! hosts for the next two years, although they were joined for several months in 1982 by another third co-host, Jim Caldwell. Willis retired from the show in September 1983, an event that coincided with the show's 10th anniversary; he was succeeded by Tim White, who remained with the program for just over one year.

==== Rotating co-hosts, 1985-1991 ====
In 1985, Prose became the single year-round host of the program. Langhart, whose Boston TV exposure had most recently been as a reporter/news contributor on CBS affiliate WNEV-TV (present-day WHDH), returned to Good Day! for a third time. She and psychologist Dr. Tom Cottle, who had been a regular contributor to Good Day!, became rotating co-hosts; Langhart co-hosted six months out of the year, while Cottle appeared for the other six. One of the rotating co-hosts remained as a contributor while the other was co-hosting. This format remained until June 1987, when Langhart left the program for the final time. For several months following Langhart's departure, Cottle remained a co-host with Prose; by the start of 1988, he was relieved of hosting duties and was strictly a contributor thereafter. During the years from 1985 through 1991, Prose would by joined by various celebrities as guest co-hosts, many of them stars of the ABC and syndicated programming seen on WCVB. Prose remained the single host of Good Day! until its cancellation in 1991.

Ted Reinstein, longtime co-host/correspondent of WCVB's nightly newsmagazine Chronicle, was a correspondent and substitute host for Good Day! in its final years.

=== Cancellation ===
In September 1991, WCVB general manager S. James Coppersmith announced the cancellation of Good Day! after 18 years, due to New England's then-current economic downturn putting severe constraints on the local broadcast stations. The demise of Good Day! followed a wave of other locally produced programs coming to an end in the Boston market within that same year, also due to a lack of financial viability in a struggling economy; among them were WBZ-TV's Evening Magazine, WHDH-TV's Ready to Go and Our Times, WGBH-TV's The Ten O'Clock News, and a host of others.

The final episode of Good Day! aired on Friday, October 11, 1991. On the last broadcast, former hosts John Willis and Michael Young appeared as in-studio guests, with Ken Stahl speaking via phone, as they and Eileen Prose presented a retrospective of the show. The following Monday, WCVB replaced Good Day! with ABC's The Home Show, which premiered in 1988 but had not been carried by WCVB up to that point.

=== After cancellation ===
==== Sunday with Eileen Prose ====
When the cancellation of Good Day! was announced, WCVB's management offered Eileen Prose the hosting role on a new weekly Sunday morning lifestyle/discussion program. This offer resulted in the series Sunday with Eileen Prose. The half-hour program premiered on November 3, 1991, and aired each Sunday morning at 10:00 on WCVB. Sunday was taped on the former Good Day! set, and like the long-running weekday morning series, it featured Prose interviewing and having discussions with experts in various fields, ranging from economics and politics to sports and entertainment. Also as on Good Day!, Frank Avruch was a regular contributor and segment host, often discussing new happenings in entertainment and interviewing guests as well.

In January 1992, after only two months as host of Sunday, Prose announced that she was leaving WCVB to look onto other ventures. She made her last appearance on the show soon after, and at that time, the show's title was officially shortened to Sunday. Prose was immediately succeeded as host by Susan Wornick, who was then WCVB's weekday afternoon news anchor and investigative reporter. Later in 1992, Wornick was replaced with series producer Valerie Navy as host. During the hosting stints of Wornick and Navy, WCVB news reporter Byron Pitts also appeared as host on some weeks. By year's end, WCVB made the decision to cancel Sunday, and the last episode aired on December 27, 1992.

==== Family Works Sunday ====
The studio set for Good Day! saw further use for monthly Sunday morning specials that WCVB aired from January through December 1993. Titled Family Works Sunday, the half-hour specials were hosted by Frank Avruch and Valerie Navy. They featured interviews and discussions that were relevant to "Family Works!", a public service campaign run by WCVB from 1991 to 1993 that focused on issues related to families and their dynamics. Topics covered included day care, divorce, caring for senior citizens, and violence in television programming. The last of these monthly specials aired on December 26, 1993, as WCVB soon initiated a new public service campaign, "Success By 6".
