= WSBK-TV =

Television station in Boston

- Boston, Massachusetts; United States
- Channels: Digital: 21 (UHF); Virtual: 38
- Branding: TV 38

Programming
- Affiliations: 38.1: Independent; for others, see § Subchannels

Ownership
- Owner: CBS Television Stations; (CBS Television Licenses LLC)
- Sister stations: WBZ-TV

History
- First air date: October 12, 1964
- Former call signs: WBCT (CP, 1963); WIHS-TV (1963–1966)
- Former channel numbers: Analog: 38 (UHF, 1964–2009); Digital: 39 (UHF, 2002–2019)
- Former affiliations: UPN (1995–2006); MyNetworkTV (2011–2022)
- Call sign meaning: Ticker symbol for former owner Storer Broadcasting

Technical information
- Licensing authority: FCC
- Facility ID: 73982
- ERP: 163 kW
- HAAT: 388.3 m (1,274 ft)
- Transmitter coordinates: 42°18′37″N 71°14′12″W

Links
- Public license information: Public file; LMS
- Website: www.cbsnews.com/boston/

WSBK-TV (channel 38) is an independent television station in Boston, Massachusetts, United States. It is owned by the CBS Television Stations group alongside CBS outlet WBZ-TV (channel 4). The two stations share studios on Soldiers Field Road in the Allston–Brighton section of Boston. WSBK-TV's transmitter is located on Cedar Street in Needham, Massachusetts, on a tower site that was formerly owned by CBS and is now owned by American Tower Corporation (which is shared with transmitters belonging to WBZ-TV, WCVB-TV, WGBH-TV, WBTS-CD, and WGBX-TV).

WSBK is also available via satellite throughout the United States on Dish Network as part of its superstation package (which since September 2013, is available only to existing subscribers of the tier). Otherwise, it enjoys cable coverage throughout much of the New England region, though this has been limited compared to the past when it was more widely distributed.

== History ==
=== Origins (1955–1966) ===
The first construction permit for channel 38 in Boston was granted in October 1955 to Ajax Enterprises, headed by Herbert Mayer, a former New York City attorney who had founded Empire Coil, a New Rochelle, New York–based manufacturer of RF coils for television stations and receivers. Mayer went on to own stations in Portland, Oregon (KPTV, the country's first licensed UHF station), and Cleveland (WXEL). He sold the cable manufacturer and both television stations to Storer Broadcasting in 1954. Channel 38 was originally slated to have the call sign WHMB; however, after Storer changed the call letters of the Cleveland property to WJW-TV in April 1956, Mayer quickly reclaimed WXEL for the Boston station. WXEL's proposed transmitter in Melrose was never built, and the Federal Communications Commission (FCC) revoked the construction permit and deleted the call sign in November 1960.

The current station signed on the air on October 12, 1964. It was first licensed to the Boston Catholic Television Center under the call letters WIHS-TV, with the call letters standing for the "IHS" initialism for the Christogram. The station employed a general entertainment format, along with broadcasts of the daily and Sunday Mass. As WIHS, the station initially programmed a "hybrid" schedule—educational (for the Catholic schools in the Boston area) and religious programs during the morning, and syndicated programs and movies (and by 1966, some shows that the Boston area's network affiliates declined to air) in the afternoon and evening. The station also carried two 15-minute local newscasts each weekday, at 5:45 and 10 pm, which consisted of an announcer reading news headlines into a camera.

The station also made an initial foray into sports, carrying ten regular season away games and all playoff road games from the Boston Celtics that were not carried on network television during the 1964–65 season. However, team management was worried about the lack of penetration of the UHF band, leading to playoff away games being simulcast on WHDH-TV (channel 5) in 1965 (that station had previously aired select Celtics telecasts, including playoff away games starting in 1962); the following season, the team moved back to WHDH outright. Some college sports (mostly hockey and basketball games) were carried during the WIHS era, which were carried over during the early Storer Broadcasting years.

=== WSBK-TV (1966–present) ===
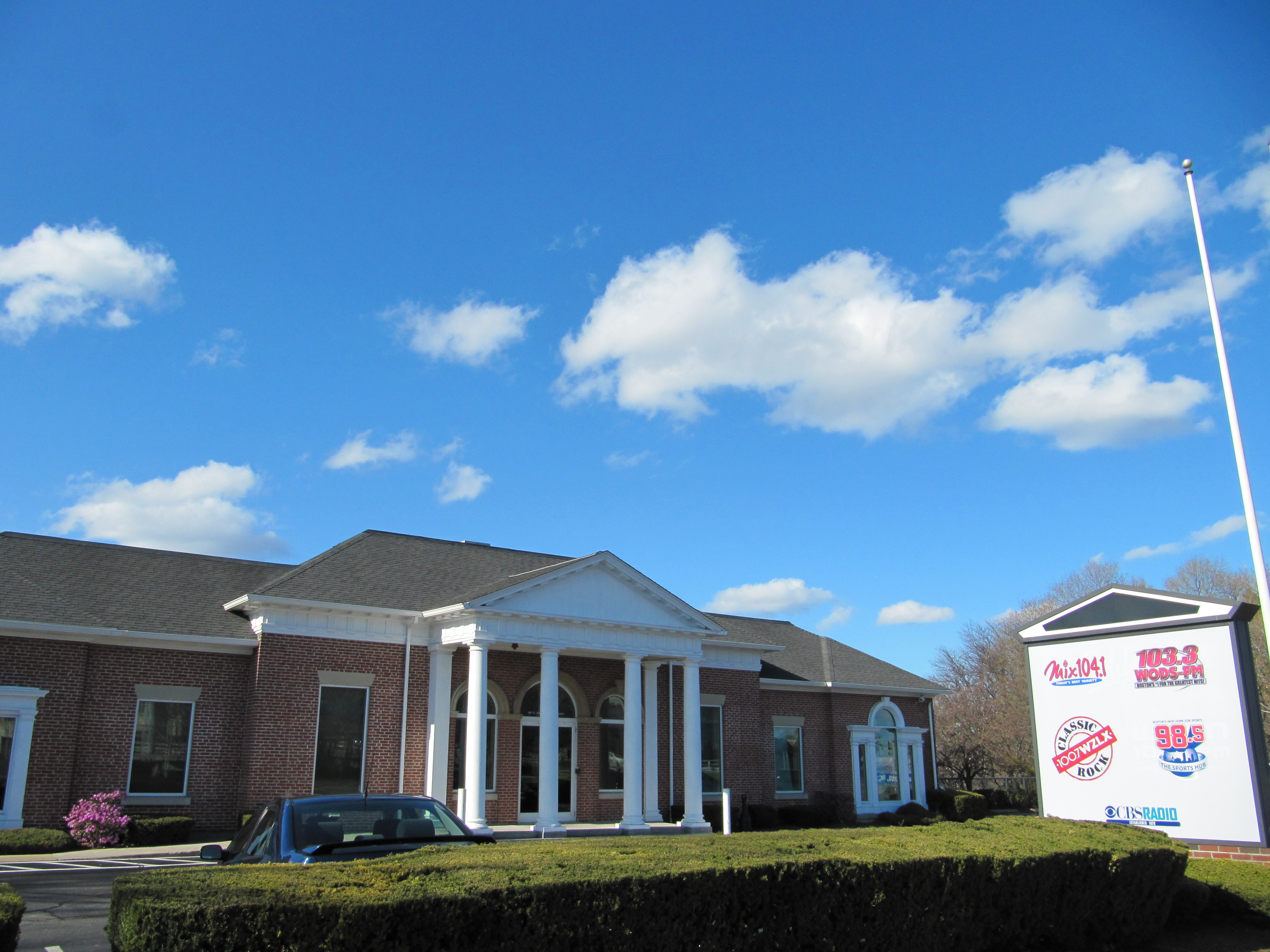
The second studio facility for WSBK-TV on Leo M. Birmingham Parkway in Brighton, constructed in Storer's trademark Colonial Revival style. After WSBK was merged into WBZ-TV in 2000, the studios were re-purposed to house CBS's Boston radio stations, which continue to be based there under Audacy.

The station was purchased by Storer Broadcasting in 1966. A few months after the purchase, the station's call sign was changed to the present WSBK-TV, named after the company's ticker symbol on the New York Stock Exchange, "SBK". General manager Bill Flynn moved quickly to improve the station's technical facilities, investing $350,000 in color cameras and a color mobile unit.

==== Early success with sports ====
Storer scored its biggest coup in 1967, when it secured broadcast rights to the Boston Bruins from WKBG-TV (channel 56, now WLVI), and eventually owned the team for a three-year period from 1972 to 1975. During the next few years, as the Bruins became a contender for the National Hockey League's Stanley Cup championship (led by young superstar Bobby Orr), the popularity of these games led to a spike in UHF antenna purchases, and helped make channel 38 one of the leading independent stations in the country. For much of the time between 1970 and 1984, WSBK would televise between 70 and 72 of the Bruins' 80 regular season games, as well as all playoff games not shown on network television.

In 1975, WSBK acquired television rights to the Boston Red Sox; during the team's first year on channel 38, the Red Sox won the American League pennant. The team remained on WSBK until 1995, and returned for another three-year period from 2003 to 2005. WSBK had broadcast between 90 and 110 Red Sox games a year between 1975 and 1983; about 75 games a year from 1984 to 1995, and a limited number of games (usually 28 to 30 a year) between 2003 and 2005. Although WSBK carried Celtics road playoff games in 1969 (the team having abandoned WKBG at the end of the regular season after seeing the number of regular-season games broadcast by channel 56 during the 1968–69 season shrink compared to the previous year), the station would not carry the NBA team's games on a regular basis until 1993. During that time, WSBK broadcast road games of the Celtics; it continued to do so through 1998.

==== Early programming ====
At the very beginning of its tenure, WSBK did not sign on until 11:30 a.m. on weekday mornings (with the Jack LaLanne exercise program), and would present programming that the Boston NBC affiliate, then WBZ-TV, declined to air. WSBK acquired many syndicated film series that were available very cheaply, because the film prints were old and had already been heavily used by other stations (like The Saint, I Led 3 Lives, Science Fiction Theater, and The Ann Sothern Show). During these early years WSBK was not yet buying blocks of feature films from major studios, and instead was airing cheaper, independently produced Hollywood films of the 1940s, mostly in late-night time slots (the primetime slots were usually reserved for sporting events).

WSBK made an unusual deal with Columbia Pictures: a 50-year contract for local broadcast rights to the Three Stooges comedy shorts, effective January 1, 1972. The station programmed these immediately, beginning on January 3, 1972, in a one-hour slot on weekday afternoons (usually at 4:30 p.m., later 4 p.m. or 5 p.m.). After-school viewers could not get enough of these slapstick comedies, and the popular Stooge hour ran until January 10, 1976. Then the films were scheduled for Saturdays only, at 5 p.m. Viewers who tuned in the following Monday were surprised to find children's cartoons, followed by Lassie. This appears to have been an attempt to compete with rival UHF station WKBG-TV, which devoted its weekday afternoons largely to cartoons. But Stooge fans wanted to see the films regularly, and protested the rescheduling. The weekday showings resumed nine months later, on September 13, 1976, and lasted just over one year. The Stooges returned to weekends only, settling into a Sunday-morning slot on October 2, 1977. For many years, on WSBK's weekly Ask the Manager forum inviting viewers to air their comments, the question asked most often was "When are you going to bring back The Three Stooges?"

During the 1970s the station inaugurated an annual New Year's Eve marathon of Stooge comedies, which became a Boston tradition until 2021. At the height of the marathon's popularity, many local performing artists were seen in live or videotaped segments between the films. WSBK promoted the marathons heavily, sometimes showing certain Stooge films in 3D or stereophonic sound.

As the station prospered, it acquired an increasingly stronger lineup of syndicated programs. During the late 1960s through (to a lesser extent) the 1990s, WSBK's staples included Perry Mason, The Alfred Hitchcock Hour, The Andy Griffith Show, The Dick Van Dyke Show, McHale's Navy, Hogan's Heroes, Cheers (itself set in Boston and now owned by CBS), M*A*S*H, and Frasier. WSBK continued to run some network programs that were preempted by the local NBC (WBZ-TV), ABC (first WNAC-TV, then WCVB-TV), and CBS (first WHDH-TV, then WNAC-TV) affiliates until 1981.

==== Children's programming ====
Every Boston station had a children's-show personality: cowboy entertainer Rex Trailer, circus clown Bozo (played by Frank Avruch), astronaut Major Mudd (played by Ed McDonnell), train conductor Bunker Hill (played by Gene Meyle until May 1970). WSBK's contender was Willie Whistle, a sailor-hatted clown who used a bird-whistle in his mouth to create a distinctive speaking voice. Willie was played by a station executive, program director Dick Beach.

WSBK acquired a library of Warner Bros.' Looney Tunes and Merrie Melodies cartoons, which aired on weekday mornings and afternoons. The Three Stooges were already established as a mainstay of children's programming.

==== Film library ====
The station also ran several movies a day (one during the day, in primetime, and late night). By the mid-1980s WSBK was airing several major-name movie franchises on a weekly basis, among them Sherlock Holmes, Charlie Chan, Mr. Moto, Blondie, Abbott and Costello, and The Bowery Boys.

Boston audiences were fond of vintage films, already being celebrated on rival Boston station WCVB-TV, with staff announcer Frank Avruch hosting prestigious Metro-Goldwyn-Mayer features on weekend nights. Avruch, dressed in formal wear, would stand in front of a movie-theater set and offer historical commentary about the films being presented. This prompted WSBK to try a different spin on the Avruch broadcasts. The Movie Loft, aired weeknights, had WSBK's own house announcer Dana Hersey in casual attire instead of formal wear, seated in a comfortable room instead of standing before a theater front. The program aired syndicated movies with interstitial program elements hosted by Hersey. Once the show was firmly established with Boston's adult movie buffs, it experimented with showing only "unedited" movies. The Movie Loft tested the boundaries of commercial broadcasting, airing movies such as The Deer Hunter, The Boys in the Band, and 48 Hrs. without editing for inappropriate content or length.

==== Becoming a superstation ====
WSBK's popularity was such that by the mid-1970s, it was available on nearly every cable provider in New England and as far west as Buffalo, New York, and as far south as Long Island. In the late 1980s, WSBK became a national superstation when it entered into an agreement with Eastern Microwave to distribute its signal outside of New England. Eastern Microwave also distributed the signal of existing superstation WOR-TV in New York City. WSBK's main selling point was its coverage of the Red Sox, similar to how WOR-TV, WGN-TV in Chicago, and WTBS in Atlanta respectively used their coverage of the New York Mets, Chicago Cubs and White Sox, and Atlanta Braves. WSBK's carriage did not reach the same level as the other stations, but covered large portions of New York (which produced the unusual circumstance of Red Sox games being regularly broadcast into part of the New York Yankees' main market; similarly, Yankees flagship station WPIX was carried by Boston area cable systems), and a handful of cable providers in Florida. WSBK's coverage of the Boston Bruins also made it a favorite superstation on Canadian cable providers, along with WOR (at the time, WOR was televising away games of all three New York-area NHL teams, the New York Islanders, the New York Rangers, and the New Jersey Devils).

When the FCC's syndication exclusivity rules (or "Syndex") were strengthened in the early 1990s, distribution of all out-of-market station signals were hampered. The rule protected stations in local markets from out-of-market competition by superstations that aired identical syndicated programming. Any station could file with cable providers for "protection" and the provider would have to black out the offending station for periods of time. The management of this "blocking" would prove so cumbersome that many cable providers began dropping distant signals such as WSBK and effectively stopped most superstation distribution. Distributors such as Eastern Microwave attempted to make it easier for cable providers by substituting shows that could not be blocked, but the damage had already been done by then.

WSBK began operating on a 24-hour schedule in the late 1970s, only to revert to late-night signoffs by the early 1980s. In the mid-1980s, WSBK dropped the midday movie to make room for more sitcoms. For a few years, WSBK signed off at 1 a.m. or 2 am, but began operating 24 hours a day (except on early Monday mornings) by the end of the decade. Although it was one of the strongest independent stations in the nation, WSBK turned down an offer to affiliate with the upstart Fox network in 1986. This may have been because most of the markets in channel 38's cable footprint had enough stations to provide Fox affiliates at the outset, making the prospect of WSBK as a multistate Fox affiliate unattractive to Storer. The Fox affiliation for the market went to WFXT in 1987 after News Corp. acquired the station from CBN.

Kohlberg Kravis Roberts bought WSBK and most of Storer's other stations in 1985. At this time, ownership was officially under the KKR subsidiary of New Boston Television, although Storer was still referenced on-air as being the parent company of WSBK. KKR later sold most of its stations to Gillett Communications. When Gillett defaulted on some of the financing agreements in the early 1990s, the ownership was restructured and the company was renamed SCI Television. Eventually, SCI ran into fiscal issues, and filed for Chapter 11 bankruptcy in 1993. As a result, WSBK was sold in a group deal to New World Communications that year.

==== Sale to Paramount and affiliation with UPN (1995–2006) ====
In 1994, New World made a landmark deal with Fox to switch most of its CBS-, ABC-, and NBC-affiliated stations to Fox. WSBK remained an independent station and was eventually put up for sale again to protect existing affiliate WFXT (channel 25), which Fox would acquire soon afterward. (WSBK would not have been beneficial to Fox, as it was a UHF station—the New World stations that switched to Fox had broadcast on VHF channels between 2 and 13—and, also unlike its sister stations, it did not have a news department.) Channel 38 was then sold to the Paramount Stations Group, controlled by Paramount Pictures (which would become a subsidiary of Viacom that same year) and became a charter affiliate of the United Paramount Network (UPN) on January 16, 1995; that June, the longtime "TV 38" branding was retired and changed to "UPN 38". In 1996, Viacom acquired a 50% ownership stake in the network from Chris-Craft Industries, which effectively made WSBK-TV a UPN owned-and-operated station.

WSBK-TV's "UPN38" logo, used from 2002 to 2006.

Originally, WSBK continued to essentially program under the conventions of an independent station as UPN would not run five nights a week of programming until 1998. While the affiliation did not result in immediate changes to the rest of its lineup outside of prime time, WSBK began incorporating more talk and reality shows by 1997, with older shows being gradually phased out. The Movie Loft was discontinued as a result of host Dana Hersey's retirement, as well as declining ratings for the program as the movie packages that the station acquired were of a lesser quality than in previous years. WSBK later revived the genre with The UPN 38 Movie House, hosted by actor and comedian Brian Frates and Movie Night (co-hosted by Dan and Dave Andelman); in the early 2000s, it also attempted a revival of The Movie Loft hosted by Skip Kelly. The station also began to decrease its telecasts of local professional sports events. For some time after affiliating with UPN, WSBK continued to air primarily cartoons and classic sitcoms. In late 1999, WSBK was lowered to only a morning cartoon block, a major amount of talk and reality shows during the midday and afternoon hours, and more recent sitcoms in the evening along with UPN shows. The station stopped carrying cartoons in 2003, around the same time that UPN discontinued the Disney's One Too block. By 2002, the station was running a blend of talk shows, court shows, and reality shows from 9 a.m. through the late afternoon, with recent off-network sitcoms continuing in the evenings. Movies were also cut back, and were generally relegated to weekends only. However, one tradition that remained on WSBK was the Sunday-morning run of The Three Stooges (until 2022, as detailed further below).

In 2000, after Viacom merged with the previous CBS Corporation—which created a duopoly with WBZ-TV, WSBK moved out of its longtime home on Leo Birmingham Parkway in Brighton and integrated its operations into WBZ-TV's facility nearby. The former WSBK studio facility is now occupied by four Boston radio stations that, until 2017, were owned by former corporate sibling CBS Radio (now Audacy). Under CBS, WSBK began sharing some first-run syndicated programs with WBZ-TV. In 2001, WSBK became the Boston home for the game shows Wheel of Fortune and Jeopardy!—unusual for a UPN or independent station (Wheel and Jeopardy! had previously run on WHDH-TV). In 2009, both shows moved to WBZ-TV, swapping stations with The Insider and Entertainment Tonight, with management citing the game shows' older-skewing demographics as more closely fitting WBZ, and the younger audiences for the entertainment news programs more closely fitting WSBK.

==== First return to independent status (2006–2011) ====
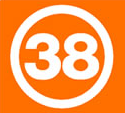
Variations of this logo were used while WSBK-TV was an independent station from September 6, 2006, to September 18, 2011. The logo was reduxed in 2022.

On January 24, 2006, CBS Corporation (which spun off from Viacom two months earlier) and the Warner Bros. unit of Time Warner announced that the two companies would shut down The WB and UPN and combine the networks' respective programming to create a new "fifth" network called The CW. Even though WSBK is owned by The CW's part-owner CBS, then-WB affiliate WLVI—owned at the time by Tribune Broadcasting (which sold that station to WHDH owner Sunbeam Television that September)—was announced as The CW's Boston outlet through an affiliation agreement that signed 16 of Tribune's 19 WB stations as charter affiliates. It would not have been an upset if WSBK had been chosen as Boston's CW affiliate, as representatives for The CW had been on record as preferring the "strongest" WB and UPN affiliates, and Boston was one of the few markets where the WB and UPN affiliates both had relatively strong viewership.

On February 22, 2006, News Corporation announced the launch of MyNetworkTV, another new broadcast television network to be operated by its Fox Television Stations and Twentieth Television divisions. WSBK was considered the favorite to become the network's Boston affiliate, but CBS Television Stations announced that May, that channel 38, along with WBFS-TV in Miami, would instead become independent stations. Although WBFS ultimately signed with MyNetworkTV, the MyNetworkTV affiliation in the Boston market eventually went to Derry, New Hampshire-based independent station WZMY-TV (channel 50, now WWJE-DT).

WSBK-TV officially reverted to the "TV 38" branding on September 6, 2006, and also revived its former Entertaining Boston slogan; the station continued to carry UPN programming until the network shut down on September 15. After the station reverted to independent status, WSBK's prime time lineup was filled by first-run syndicated programs (initially a second run of Dr. Phil at 8 p.m. and a second run of Jeopardy! at 9 pm), and a WBZ-produced 9:30 p.m. newscast. The station adopted a new ad campaign entitled Hello in September 2009, where the majority of station promotion is centered around the word "hello"; this new campaign also brought forth a mascot called the TV 38 Blockhead.

==== Switch to MyNetworkTV (2011–2022) ====
Logo as "MyTV38", used from September 19, 2011, to September 4, 2022. The 3D version was introduced on August 31, 2015.

On June 15, 2011, WBIN-TV (the former WZMY-TV) announced that it would end its affiliation with MyNetworkTV that September to become an independent station. CBS Television Stations subsequently signed an affiliation agreement with the programming service five days later, on June 20, 2011, to move its Boston area affiliation to WSBK. It is believed that CBS' initial decision to deny its larger UPN stations affiliation agreements with MyNetworkTV was in retaliation against Fox for refusing to affiliate any of its UPN affiliates in markets where CBS Corporation or Tribune did not already sign deals to carry The CW with that network. WSBK affiliated with MyNetworkTV on September 19, 2011 (joining Miami sister station WBFS-TV as one of two CBS-owned stations to maintain an affiliation with the service). The station's branding was amended to "myTV38", in accordance to the new affiliation.

==== Second return to independent status (2022–present) ====
On September 19, 2022, WSBK-TV reverted to being an independent station, ending its affiliation with MyNetworkTV and leaving the programming service without an outlet in the Boston market. In preparation for the move, earlier in the month, the station returned its TV38 moniker for the third time, along with its post-UPN "circle 38" logo. During its final week as a MyNetworkTV affiliate, the station stopped broadcasting the service's programing on weeknights (which has been airing in its hour-then-national pattern (9–11 p.m. ET) time period since 2016), exiling the programming to a convoluted, tape-delayed morning schedule, which was entirely cut in half, airing from 9 a.m. to 10 a.m., and then airing its other hour of the block from 11 a.m. to 12 p.m., with its delay structure further fragmented chronologically to close out the broadcast week (for example, WSBK aired the delayed network programming that originally streamed nationally the previous Friday night on Monday, while airing the delayed network programming from the previous Thursday night on Friday).

The Three Stooges had been seen on and off on WSBK since 1972. Sony Pictures, the successor to the original syndicator, wanted to cancel the station's 50-year contract for years, preferring to reserve the Stooge films for more lucrative cable outlets, but WSBK insisted that its contract was ironclad. Eventually only two stations in America were still allowed to show the Stooges on local broadcast television: WSBK in Boston and WGN-TV in Chicago.

WSBK-TV's 50-year pact finally expired in September 2022. WSBK wanted to renew the contract or sign a new one, but Sony refused. There have been no New Year's Eve Three Stooges marathons since December 31, 2021. (Three Stooges shorts continue to air in Boston on the MeTV-affiliated 5.2 subchannel of WCVB.)

== Programming ==
WSBK-TV occasionally takes on the responsibility of airing CBS network programming whenever WBZ-TV runs extended breaking news coverage or special programming. Examples of this practice include during the Boston Marathon, and more recently in 2009, during New England Patriots preseason games as well as the funerals of Senator Ted Kennedy and his sister Eunice Kennedy Shriver.

=== Sports ===
In terms of sports, WSBK was the longtime television home of the Boston Red Sox and Boston Bruins. WSBK became the Red Sox's over-air flagship station in 1975 and remained so for 20 years until it lost the broadcast rights to WABU (channel 68, now WBPX-TV) in 1996. After a seven-season hiatus, WSBK (in partnership with sister station WBZ-TV) resumed its role as the Red Sox flagship station, replacing WFXT, in 2003; however, channel 38 only broadcast the team's Friday night games. Most games were carried by the New England Sports Network (NESN), which aired the Friday night games outside of the Boston television market, effectively blacking out WSBK in these areas (the Red Sox hold an 80% ownership interest in NESN). Among the nationally prominent announcers that have performed play-by-play duties for the station's Red Sox games include Dick Stockton and Sean McDonough. WBZ stopped broadcasting the games after the 2004 season, and WSBK would cease airing games itself following the 2005 season, rendering the team's game telecasts cable-exclusive. The Red Sox returned to WSBK in the 2026 season, when the station simulcast two August games with NESN against the Arizona Diamondbacks as part of the annual telethon for the Jimmy Fund that NESN co-hosts with WEEI-FM.

WSBK was also the over-the-air flagship of the Boston Bruins for more than 30 years. Its broadcasts were considered important enough to the station, especially in the 1970s when the Bruins were one of the perennially elite teams in the National Hockey League and enormously popular in Boston, that WSBK's then-owners Storer Broadcasting purchased and owned the Bruins for several years. The announcers for most of the Bruins games were hall-of-famer Fred Cusick (on play-by-play) and Johnny Peirson (on color commentary), who was later succeeded by Dave Shea and former Bruin Derek Sanderson; Dale Arnold called the play-by-play in later years. As with the Red Sox, Bruins coverage gradually moved to NESN. Nearly all home games were broadcast on NESN starting in 1984, and coverage left WSBK entirely in 2002.

In addition, WSBK became the over-the-air home of the Boston Celtics in 1993, replacing WFXT (which the team had owned at that time). It lost the broadcast rights in 1998 to WABU. All Celtics games not on national television are now broadcast on NBC Sports Boston. From 2005 until 2019, WSBK carried Atlantic Coast Conference (ACC) college football and basketball games produced and syndicated by Raycom Sports (through its ACC Network package), after Boston College's move to the conference created regional interest for the ACC; the package ended as a result of ESPN launching an ACC Network cable channel.

In 2007, Major League Soccer announced that WSBK would become the exclusive carrier of the New England Revolution, replacing WLVI and FSN New England. After three seasons, the Revolution moved their non-nationally televised games to Comcast SportsNet New England (the former FSN New England and current NBC Sports Boston) in 2010; in 2021, the club moved its telecasts back to WSBK as part of a partnership with sister station WBZ-TV. WSBK and WBZ lost their local rights to Revolution games in 2023, when all MLS broadcasts shifted over to MLS Season Pass, a new subscription service hosted on Apple TV.

In December 2007, WSBK produced the first ever over-the-air television broadcasts of the Eastern Massachusetts High-School Football Super Bowl games, broadcasting three of the seven divisional championship contests (the other four aired on Comcast SportsNet New England). This arrangement continued through 2012; as of 2013, the six statewide state championship games air on Comcast SportsNet New England. Starting in 2009, audio-only simulcasts of these games began airing on then-sister radio station WBZ-FM (98.5 MHz). The station previously aired sports replay programs called Red Sox This Week and Patriots This Week during their respective seasons; the latter program has since moved to Comcast SportsNet New England. The station broadcasts the "Fifth Quarter" postgame shows after 4:25 p.m. ET Patriots' games (due partly to WBZ's network commitments with CBS to broadcast 60 Minutes), as well as 1 p.m. Patriots games on weeks in which CBS is airing a doubleheader.

=== Local programming ===
One of WSBK's most remembered past programs was the informative and often amusing series Ask the Manager, created by then-general manager William J. Flynn in the mid-1970s. Each week Flynn, and later his successors Joseph C. Dimino, Daniel J. Berkery and Stuart Tauber would answer viewer questions on-air. The letters were read each week for many years by the station's announcer and host Dana Hersey. Other letter-readers included Sean McDonough and Carla Nolan. Meg LaVigne and Leslie Savage occasionally substituted in the manager's chair. The program's producer, Cliff Allen, was often referred to when off-camera, but did substitute as letter reader on many occasions. Allen died just weeks before Ask the Manager broadcast its final show in January 1999; the series finale was dedicated to his memory. Though it was long hampered by poor viewership, the show became a cult favorite. There were other attempts at local programs on WSBK through the years with shows such as We Don't Knock, A.M. Boston, and Hersey's Hollywood.

From May 2001 to August 2004, WSBK had rights to Lottery Live, the nightly broadcasts of the Massachusetts State Lottery games. After the station moved into WBZ's studios, WSBK continued to broadcast the drawings. This was because WBZ had the games to itself for three years prior to the move. When WSBK's contract expired, the lottery drawings were moved to WCVB-TV (channel 5).

WSBK broadcasts Phantom Gourmet on weekends depending on the station's programming commitments; a half-hour version of the show has also aired at noon on weekdays since 2009; reruns began to air in prime time in 2022 with the MyNetworkTV disaffiliation. In 2007, WSBK revived Community Auditions, the local talent competition program that had run on WBZ-TV from 1965 to 1986. With series creator and former host Dave Maynard as a consultant (until his death in February 2012), the new Community Auditions was hosted by WJMN (94.5 FM) radio DJ Ramiro, with former WBZ entertainment reporter Joyce Kulhawik, WMJX (106.7 FM)'s Candy O'Terry and WODS (103.3 FM)'s J.J. Wright as judges. Originally airing Fridays at 9:30 p.m. during its first four years, WSBK moved the program to Saturdays at midnight for a few months in the fall of 2011, before shifting it to Sundays at noon in February 2012. Community Auditions was also syndicated to WWLP in Springfield and WPXT in Portland, Maine, and was rebroadcast on WBZ-TV on Saturdays at midnight and Sundays at 1 a.m.

=== Newscasts ===
As WIHS-TV, the station had a small news operation, featuring former WBZ-TV anchor Victor Best. After becoming WSBK-TV, the station considered producing a local, in-house 10 p.m. newscast in the 1970s. However, Storer received indications that such a venture would get low ratings and lose money, leading it to conclude that there was no market for a local 10 p.m. newscast in Boston. As a result, unlike most top-rated independents in markets of its size, channel 38 never had a news department in its incarnation as WSBK.

In 1980, WSBK did begin running a nationally syndicated newscast for independent stations, Independent Network News (INN), which was produced by New York City's WPIX and distributed by its owner Tribune Broadcasting. INN did not do well in Boston; part of the reason for the low ratings was that the newscast sometimes aired late due to Red Sox or Bruins games, putting it in direct competition with the 11 p.m. newscasts on WBZ-TV, WCVB-TV, and WNAC-TV/WNEV-TV. After 1984, it also faced competition from a local 10 p.m. newscast on WLVI-TV. In January 1986, the weeknight INN broadcasts moved to WLVI, airing after that station's 10 p.m. news—before INN was dropped by the station after one year (it was not acquired by another station in the Boston market).

WSBK finally launched a 10 p.m. local newscast on October 25, 1993, by way of the WBZ-produced WBZ News 4 on TV 38, competing against both WLVI and a New England Cable News (NECN)-produced program on WFXT; this program was canceled on August 6, 1995, soon after the sale of WSBK to Paramount, as it was felt that the WBZ News 4 branding was incompatible with the then-new "UPN 38" brand. Rumors soon spread that NECN would move its 10 p.m. newscast from WFXT to WSBK; on October 2, 1995, the day after NECN's contract with WFXT expired, the regional news channel began producing UPN 38 Prime News. Lila Orbach was the original sole anchor, reprising her role on the WFXT newscast, eventually, Margie Reedy and R. D. Sahl (who were formerly paired as anchors during their tenures at WHDH-TV) took over for the remainder of its run. This newscast generally trailed both WLVI's program and, starting in 1996, an in-house newscast on WFXT; on October 4, 1998, WSBK discontinued UPN 38 Prime News to refocus towards sports and entertainment shows (around the same time, sister UPN stations KSTW in Seattle and WTOG in Tampa canceled their own in-house newscasts, while KMAX-TV in Sacramento downsized to focus on morning news), though NECN continued to produce news updates within Bruins telecasts during the 1998–1999 season. The station replaced the 10 p.m. newscast with a two-hour late-evening comedy lineup (including Cheers and Mad About You), promoted in the fall of 1998 as Laughter Dark.

After Viacom merged with CBS, putting WSBK and WBZ-TV under the same ownership, WBZ once again began producing a newscast for the station starting in 2001. On September 3, WSBK debuted a 7 p.m. newscast; initially called THE 7 O'Clock News on UPN 38 (always emphasizing "the"), it was later rebranded as WBZ 4 News at 7 O'Clock. This newscast was replaced on March 29, 2002, by a new 10 p.m. newscast, titled Nightcast at 10 on UPN 38, which launched on April 1. On September 16, 2002, an hour-long extension of WBZ-TV's weekday morning newscast was added at 7 am, known as The Morning News on UPN 38.

WSBK dropped Nightcast on January 16, 2005, and turned its attention to the morning newscast, which was relaunched as The Morning Show on April 4. On September 12, the program began airing 8 to 9 a.m. to make room for the first two hours of the nationally syndicated morning show, The Daily Buzz. The Morning Show aired its last broadcast on June 30, 2006, The Daily Buzz was dropped at the same time (it would return to the market in January 2011 on WLVI, and later moved to WBIN-TV).

When WSBK became an independent station for the second time, WBZ-TV began to produce a weeknight newscast called TV 38 News at 9:30, the newscast was then moved up a half-hour to 9 p.m. on April 23, 2007, retitled as TV 38 News at 9, and switching time slots with a second run of Jeopardy! On August 25, 2008, the newscast became known as WBZ News on TV 38 (on occasion, it is also referred to as WBZ News at 9); it now mirrors the news programs that air on WBZ-TV, as had been the case with 10 p.m. broadcast that WBZ produced in the mid-1990s and the former 7 p.m. newscast. On December 12, 2008, the newscast began to be broadcast in high definition after WBZ upgraded its newscasts to the format. For a period starting in late-August 2009, WSBK also ran a rebroadcast of WBZ-TV's noon newscast at 12:30 pm; this was subsequently replaced with Judge Judy. When the station joined MyNetworkTV, WSBK moved the prime time newscast back to 10 p.m. on September 19, 2011; the newscast is now referred to as WBZ News at 10. On September 29, 2014, the 10 p.m. newscast was now an hour long. As of August 29, 2016, the newscast is being seen at 8 pm. On September 24, 2019, as part of the launch of CBSN Boston, the 8 p.m. newscast was moved to that service, while retaining a simulcast on WSBK-TV. On July 18, 2022, a 10 newscast was reintroduced under the CBS News Now format; the 8 p.m. newscast was not affected. On August 31, 2023, the 10 p.m. newscast was cancelled, following the end of the CBS News Now format across CBS-owned duopoly stations and standalone CW affiliates that became independent the next day; as replacement, on September 1, a new 9 p.m. newscast from WBZ News was introduced to WSBK, serving as extension to the 8 p.m. newscast.

== Technical information ==
=== Subchannels ===
The station's signal is multiplexed:

Subchannels of WSBK-TV
Subchannel	Res.	Short name	Programming
38.1	1080i	WSBK-TV	Independent
38.2	480i	WSBK.2	Heroes & Icons
38.3	480i	WSBK.3	QVC
38.4	480i	WSBK.4	QVC2
38.5	480i	WSBK.5	Movies!
38.6	480i	WSBK.6	Confess
66.4	480i	CourtTV	Court TV (WUNI)

Broadcast on behalf of another station

=== Analog-to-digital conversion ===
WSBK-TV shut down its analog signal, over UHF channel 38, on June 12, 2009, the official date on which full-power television stations in the United States transitioned from analog to digital broadcasts under federal mandate. The station's digital signal continued to broadcast on its pre-transition UHF channel 39, using virtual channel 38.

== See also ==
- Channel 38 virtual TV stations in the United States
- Channel 21 digital TV stations in the United States
- List of television stations in Massachusetts
- List of United States stations available in Canada
