= Karen Holmes Ward =

American broadcaster and director

- Born: Cleveland, Ohio
- Education: Boston University School of Public Communication
- Occupations: Radio and television broadcaster
- Father: Clarence Holsey Holmes

Karen Holmes Ward is a broadcaster and director in Boston. Holmes Ward is the Director of Public Affairs and Community Services at WCVB-TV and the host of CityLine, a magazine program chronicling the lives of people of color in Boston.

== Early life and education ==
Ward grew up in Cleveland, Ohio. In high school, Ward was involved in the media club and was the first female play by play announcer for the school's basketball team. Ward studied broadcast journalism at Boston University's School of Public Communication and graduated in 1977.

== Career ==
Ward is also a member of the Divas Uncorked group of African American women who want to make wine more approachable to people of color.

Ward's community service efforts after the Boston Marathon attack were recognized with the National Association of Broadcasters’ Service to Community in Television award. Ward received the Lifetime Achievement Award from the National Academy of Television Arts & Sciences.

== Awards ==
In 2023, she was recognized as one of "Boston’s most admired, beloved, and successful Black Women leaders" by the Black Women Lead project.
