= Chronicle (American TV program) =

American newsmagazine television program

- Presented by: See Correspondents below
- Country of origin: United States
- Original language: English

Production
- Camera setup: Multi-camera
- Running time: 30 minutes

Original release
- Network: WCVB
- Release: January 25, 1982 – present
- Network: WMUR
- Release: September 2001 – present

Chronicle is an American newsmagazine television program that is produced by two New England television stations owned by Hearst Television: WCVB-TV (channel 5) in Boston, Massachusetts and WMUR-TV (channel 9) in Manchester, New Hampshire. The program premiered on WCVB on January 25, 1982, and the WMUR version premiered in September 2001. It airs weeknights at 7:00 p.m. on WMUR and 7:30 p.m. on WCVB, offering an informative lifestyle, cultural and news-related magazine format, most often covering a single topic within each broadcast.

The introductions of each segment and of the program itself are broadcast live, while on-location material is pre-recorded. On October 25, 2006, the WCVB edition of Chronicle began broadcasting in high definition, airing letterboxed on WCVB's analog signal until its 2009 phase-out, with WMUR New Hampshire edition also following suit. In addition, WTAE-TV (channel 4) in Pittsburgh, Pennsylvania, also owned by Hearst, has produced a series of specials based on the Chronicle format since 2013. Other Hearst stations have since done specials under the Chronicle format including WESH (channel 2) in Daytona Beach, Florida; WXII-TV (channel 12) in Winston-Salem, North Carolina and WVTM-TV (channel 13) in Birmingham, Alabama (the latter of which will start in fall 2018).

== Synopsis ==
Many of the stories on Chronicle involve those that are of interest to New Englanders, from landmarks, vacation getaways, and the fine arts, to inspirational stories of people who overcame adversity, made an important contribution to society or, those who are currently in the news. However, Chronicle tends to avoid sensational tabloid topics and, since its premiere, has never featured story content that underestimates the intellect of its audience. The program has been highly regarded for most of its existence, and its long-running segments, most notably The Main Streets & Back Roads, have become institutions.

=== Main Streets and Back Roads ===
Main Streets & Back Roads is Chronicle's longest-lasting regular segment; each installment profiles a different rural town from around the region. Interviews with residents, business owners, and anyone else who has significance to the location are featured. Often, the basic lifestyles of the area are covered, but sometimes the legends or famous myths of the city or town are investigated. In 1987, it started featuring correspondent Peter Mehegan's travels in a restored 1969 Chevrolet Impala coupe, which became the most recognizable aspect of the Main Streets episodes.

=== Special topics ===
In addition to the program's regular segments, other general subjects discussed on Chronicle have included people diagnosed with rare forms of cancer, and other life-threatening diseases. The early stages, treatment, and the effects their illnesses have on their overall life and mental well-being are all depicted. Similar stories even follow people, young or old, who had survived life-threatening accidents and now had to deal with permanent handicaps or altered appearances. While these stories are in no way meant to depress the viewers, they often do not flinch from their subjects' grim realities; at the same time, they are intended to educate and inspire the audience. Certain people who have been profiled over the years have connected with viewers to indirectly teach lessons about the human spirit.

=== Pop Chron ===
Chronicle has a few other continuing segments running besides the venerable Main Streets & Back Roads. A monthly continuing segment was Pop Chron, an episode devoted to covering the latest happenings in pop culture, from the fine arts to movies; television; literature; fashion and music, among other topics. Nearly all Chronicle regulars had been involved with Pop Chron since its inception in 1997. This recurring episode theme was discontinued in the late 2000s.

=== On the Road ===
On the Road was a de facto offshoot of Main Streets & Back Roads, with Peter Mehegan driving his Chevrolet Impala to different locations in Maine – where in each segment, Mehegan met up with interesting people, looks in on local issues – and collects stunning scenery from the area. This episode theme was launched shortly before Mehegan's retirement from Chronicle in 2005, but continued as an occasional piece for several years more (with Mehegan returning as a guest contributor).

=== Guest contributors ===
Guest contributors, mostly on-air talent from WCVB's NewsCenter 5 broadcasts and other programs on the station, have included financial reporter/analyst Mark Mills, who contributed to stories involving the Massachusetts economy. His stories have ranged from the "Great Comeback" of 1984–85, through the 1987 stock market crash to the recession of the early 1990s and its subsequent recovery ("the dot com boom"). WCVB news reporter Chuck Kraemer was an on-location correspondent from time to time. On January 28, 2011, NewsCenter 5 EyeOpener anchor Bianca de la Garza served as co-host and was also featured in a segment with Professor Lyrical, a master hip-hop rapper and professor at Northeastern University. Liz Brunner, who was a member of Chronicle's regular reporting staff from 1993 to 2002, had returned to the program as a frequent contributor as well until her departure from WCVB in 2013.

== History ==
=== Development and original format ===
Chronicle was conceived as the latest in a long line of original local programming produced by WCVB-TV, which, by the early 1980s, was considered by The New York Times to be "the best TV station in the country". Up to that time, WCVB produced more local shows than any other network-affiliated station. Many of the programs received national attention and/or distribution. Seeing how well its other public affairs and talk programs were doing, station management decided that the market was ripe for a five-day-a-week competitor to WBZ-TV (channel 4; then an NBC affiliate, now a CBS owned-and-operated station)'s Evening Magazine. The new program, with proposed titles including OnLine, Prime Access, Tuning In, Close Up and 5 to You, was to follow the Evening Magazine format; a 30-minute newsmagazine covering a variety of different topics each night, ranging from arts and entertainment to human interest stories.

Chronicle was structured this way when it premiered on Monday, January 25, 1982, at 7:30 pm. Hosted by WCVB chief news anchor Chet Curtis, with co-anchors Donna Downes and Jeanne Blake, the program covered four unrelated topics with local appeal. Among the segments featured in the show's premiere edition focused on wintertime on Cape Cod and funny pet tricks. Almost immediately, reviews for Chronicle were mixed. Some thought WCVB's effort to have an Evening Magazine-style show of their own paid off and had potential, while one reviewer, Jack Thomas of the Boston Globe, went so far as to criticize the show by comparing it to 60 Minutes. The review read, "If Mike Wallace had watched the first 10 Chronicle shows, he would sue the producers for defamation of character, because Chronicle is a "dog-and-pony" show compared with 60 Minutes." Undaunted, the producers went along and continued running the mixed bag of stories until a few months into the show's run. Possibly due to marginal ratings, if not anything else, Chronicle began to evolve into its current form, a newsmagazine that tackles one single topic per night. The new, longer segment style, including topics listed above, gradually built a substantial audience.

As the producers found the formula that worked, there was some turnover of Chronicle's on-air staff in its early years. In the fall of 1982, Chet Curtis left the program, and was replaced by new lead anchor/reporter Peter Mehegan. Jeanne Blake would stay on as lead female anchor as well as a reporter, but Donna Downes would depart in 1983. Another original regular, contributor Arnie Reisman, hosted an Andy Rooney-like closing segment that poked fun at life's little foibles. When the show underwent an early revamp beginning in the fall of 1982, Reisman was replaced with Tony Kahn, who then did similar closing segments. As main Chronicle segments became more involved due to the single-topic format, Kahn and his social commentary segment became occasional until they were phased out entirely in 1985 (WCVB would subsequently produce a number of primetime specials featuring Kahn, which were extended versions of this social commentary segment).

However, it was correspondent/contributor Mike Barnicle, a columnist who had stints at both The Boston Globe and Boston Herald, who remained in the long run. Known for his hard-biting, "to the point" commentary and unique outlook on whatever story he covered, Barnicle became the program's source of social and political relevance. Barnicle was the longest-running member of the original Chronicle reporter's lineup; he lasted from the January 1982 premiere until 2005, save for a period between August 1998 and January 1999 when WCVB put him on a leave of absence, after a plagiarism investigation was launched involving several of Barnicle's Boston Globe articles. Like senior anchor Peter Mehegan, who retired from his nightly work on Chronicle in 2005, Barnicle has reappeared as a guest contributor since leaving.

=== Formula for success ===
As Chronicle flourished, it soon rose to the top of the ratings, beating out the array of competition (from off-network reruns, to Evening Magazine and Entertainment Tonight) at 7:30 weeknights. On the heels of its success came the introduction of special continuing segments within-the-show. The first, and ultimately most successful segment was Main Streets & Back Roads, which first aired on July 8, 1983. The inaugural edition, with Jeanne Blake on location, was about Mystic, Connecticut.

More on-air talent arrived just as the show was reaching new heights of success; 1984 saw a significant change in personnel. First, Jeanne Blake announced her decision to leave WCVB for rival WBZ, and was replaced by another NewsCenter 5 anchor, Mary Richardson. Andria Hall, a new correspondent, joined in 1985, and within a few years she would also serve as a fill-in anchor. Richardson, who had been anchoring weekday afternoon and weekend newscasts for WCVB since 1980, joined Peter Mehegan, also a NewsCenter 5 emigre. In time, Richardson and Mehegan became just as dependable and recognizable as channel 5's lead anchor team of Natalie Jacobson and Chet Curtis. Of course, unlike Curtis during his several months on Chronicle in 1982, both Mehegan and Richardson never returned to the NewsCenter 5 broadcasts.

=== Peter Mehegan debuts "The Old Chevy" ===
In 1987, Peter Mehegan introduced a tradition that continues as a symbol for Chronicle viewers, and fans of The Main Streets & Back Roads. Mehegan and his wife kept a rotting 1969 Chevrolet Impala V8 in their backyard garage after inheriting it from an aunt. Rather than have the car decay and get hidden by all the weeds growing in the garage, Mehegan set about to get it restored, hiring auto body specialists that spent months bringing "the old Chevy" back to life. After a complete overhaul and the installation of a new engine, Mehegan decided to share the project in a Main Streets segment, and then took it out for a spin to the show's next destination. He fell in love with the Chevy so much that he kept it as the principal vehicle for all Main Streets & Back Roads and (later) On the Road trips. Although it has been scarcely featured since the early 2010s, the Chevy remains Mehegan's loyal companion in his occasional guest appearances and is an institution for viewers.

=== Late 1980s/1990s ===
By the end of the decade, Chronicle had already won several New England Emmy Awards and countless other accolades. Its critical acclaim got the show picked up for a few national runs, although on a limited basis. In the late 1980s, Chronicle was seen on cable's Arts & Entertainment Network (A&E), and later had selected runs on The Travel Channel. In 1992, Chronicle won the first of its two duPont-Columbia Awards.

Into the early 1990s, the roster of talent remained stable. No further changes occurred on the program until February 1993, when Andria Hall announced her departure. Hall had been chosen to anchor Front Page, a prime-time newsmagazine for the Fox network. In early March, Hall signed off from Chronicle, and for the next six months, Mehegan, Richardson and Barnicle remained the only marquee regulars on the show. In September 1993, Hall's permanent replacement finally arrived in new reporter Liz Brunner. Like Hall, Brunner became a substitute anchor for Mehegan and/or Richardson whenever she was needed. Soon after her arrival, Ted Reinstein joined the show on a recurring basis as a general features reporter. Previously known for his work as a contributor on WCVB's morning show Good Day!, and for hosting Discover New England, specials which WCVB aired once or twice seasonally in Chronicle's timeslot, Reinstein soon moved into a full-time reporting position, and was credited as a marquee reporter by 1995. Brunner and Reinstein added their own experiences and point of view, sometimes being the subject of stories themselves.

In the fall of 1995, as Chronicle introduced yet another new graphic look and theme song, the show launched a popular ad campaign using the slogan "News You Can Use" (with the lyrics "Chronicle has got the news, the news you can use!"). The melody, developed as a generic tune by Gari Communications (now Gari Media Group) with vocals partially supplied by singer-songwriter Jake Holmes, was also in use (with different lyrics) at other stations. While this Chronicle campaign lasted a couple of years, the instrumental version of "News You Can Use" (in a different arrangement than what was used in promos) became the new theme song, which remained unchanged from its debut in November 1995 until its retirement in March 2008. This Chronicle theme lasted far longer than the NewsCenter 5 theme package from Gari Communications that was introduced at the same time ("Image News", which debuted to all Hearst stations beginning in the fall of 1995, was used as the WCVB news package until December 2003). Since March 2008, an instrumental soft-rock tune, dominated by piano, has been used as the theme music. Although WCVB's Chronicle no longer uses the "News You Can Use" theme, WMUR's New Hampshire Chronicle has continued to use the theme since the program's 2001 premiere until August 2018.

=== 2000–present ===
Chronicle's ability to maintain a stable roster of talent continued. After the permanent addition of Liz Brunner and Ted Reinstein, the team saw no more changes for the rest of the 1990s. After 2000, there would be shakeups, as WCVB as a whole saw many prominent personalities leave the station or switch positions. With the departure of Heather Kahn from NewsCenter 5 in 2000, Liz Brunner expanded her news duties by taking over Kahn's former role as co-anchor of the 5:30 p.m. newscast. Later that same year, she also began co-anchoring the 11 p.m. newscast. However, for a couple years more, she would occasionally still appear on Chronicle. She would not have a permanent replacement until 2002, when Karen Holmes Ward, host of WCVB's weekend public affairs show CityLine, assumed the position. Then in 2005, three correspondents departed Chronicle. That spring, after nearly 23 years with the program, Peter Mehegan announced he was stepping down as the program's lead anchor and correspondent, although he agreed to still do periodic On the Road segments; Mehegan's final telecast as a regular aired in September 2005. Shortly thereafter, Ward was dropped as a correspondent and fill-in anchor. In the wake of these departures, Mike Barnicle, who was the only surviving member of the original Chronicle roster, decided he would look onto new opportunities, and left the regular staff by year's end. As with Mehegan, Barnicle has returned as guest contributor at least a few times a year since.

Meanwhile, NewsCenter 5 lead anchor Anthony Everett, who had often been a Chronicle substitute anchor in 2005, was slated to be interim male anchor until the producers found a replacement for Peter Mehegan. After deciding that his replacement needed to be a veteran of WCVB with a strong viewer connection, management let Everett stay as full-time anchor alongside Mary Richardson. He continued his role as lead anchor on NewsCenter 5 while anchoring Chronicle, which in a sense brought the program full circle. Chet Curtis, who had been replaced by Everett at the news department when he defected to New England Cable News in 2000, was a Chronicle anchor in 1982 when the program premiered, while having remained lead anchor at NewsCenter 5. Liz Brunner was the only non-lead anchor to do both the news and Chronicle simultaneously; in 1994, a year after joining Chronicle, she began co-anchoring NewsCenter 5's early morning EyeOpener newscast (Brunner was replaced on EyeOpener in 2000 by Heather Unruh).

With the new anchor team in place by the end of 2005, Chronicle went several more months with a smaller group of regulars. In April 2006, new talent finally arrived; reporter Shayna Seymour was hired away from ABC affiliate WGGB-TV in Springfield, Massachusetts. Seymour currently covers general interest stories, but has also garnered a producer credit.

On March 26, 2007, Anthony Everett's duties on WCVB became exclusively with Chronicle. In the time since Everett became a full-fledged member of the program's on-air team, it was station management's plan to phase him out of his demanding news duties and have him focus solely on Chronicle. Everett had mutually agreed to switch his focus at the station from the daily demands of hard news to specialty stories on the newsmagazine. Like Peter Mehegan before him, Everett left a permanent anchor post at NewsCenter 5. His position was filled by Ed Harding, who thus became WCVB's new lead anchor beside Natalie Jacobson and shortly after with Liz Brunner, who was promoted to female lead anchor when Jacobson retired in July 2007.

On March 25, 2010, WCVB announced that after 26 years, Mary Richardson would leave Chronicle and the station. Richardson's farewell broadcast aired on Friday, May 21, 2010; the following Monday, Everett began anchoring the show alone. On April 8, 2013, after three years as a solo anchor, it was announced that WCVB meteorologist JC Monahan would permanently join Chronicle as Everett's co-anchor later in the spring. Monahan was originally slated to start in June, but she ultimately made her debut on May 23, 2013. Former WFXT meteorologist (and close friend of Monahan's) Cindy Fitzgibbon replaced Monahan on the NewsCenter 5 EyeOpener and Midday newscasts.

Erika Tarantal, co-anchor of WCVB's NewsCenter 5 at Noon, became a reporter and fill-in anchor for Chronicle in 2016.

In early 2017, Monahan announced her intention to leave WCVB for other opportunities. While she left her current post as co-anchor of the station's 5:00 newscast in March, she remained on Chronicle through May 24. The following day, longtime program reporter and producer Shayna Seymour replaced Monahan as co-anchor.

== Regional versions ==
=== New Hampshire Chronicle ===
In September 2001, following Hearst-Argyle's purchase of Manchester, New Hampshire ABC affiliate WMUR-TV (channel 9) the previous December, a second local edition of Chronicle premiered. Titled New Hampshire Chronicle, as a co-production between WMUR and originator WCVB, it is basically the same show and format, only tailor-made for New Hampshire-area viewers. The unique lifestyles, inspirational stories, flavor and quirks of New Hampshire are all accented; the program is specifically focused on that state, whereas the Boston-produced parent program encompasses New England as a whole.

New Hampshire Chronicle was anchored for its first ten years by WMUR lead anchors Tom Griffith and Tiffany Eddy, who also served as contributors. Anchor Sean McDonald sometimes substituted for Griffith. Another regular is Fritz Wetherbee (former host of WENH-TV's New Hampshire Crossroads), a legendary local storyteller who puts topics in his own perspective, and shares his own stories with the home viewer. An expanded group of reporters were added to the show within the first few years, including veteran local producers Jennifer Crompton and Cindy Jones.

Griffith and Eddy left the program following the March 2, 2012 broadcast, and were replaced on March 5 by McDonald and fellow anchor Erin Fehlau.

New Hampshire Chronicle has won numerous New England Emmy Awards.

=== WTAE Chronicle ===
In June 2012, Hearst-owned WTAE-TV in Pittsburgh, Pennsylvania announced the launch of WTAE Chronicle, a series of hour-long news specials dedicated to in-depth reporting on relevant topics to Pittsburgh and Western Pennsylvania. Longtime WTAE anchor Sally Wiggin shifted from her role as anchor of the station's noon newscast to focus on WTAE Chronicle and additional station projects. WTAE Chronicle debuted in March 2013, with a report from Vatican City on the election of Pope Francis; the second edition focused on the importance of "The Point" – an area of downtown Pittsburgh where the three rivers transversing the city meet. Both were ratings hits in the Pittsburgh television market.

== Chronicle recognized for its 25th anniversary ==
For the 25th anniversary of the flagship Chronicle program on January 25, 2007, the Brigham's Ice Cream Company (with facilities based in Arlington, Massachusetts) introduced a special new flavor in honor of the show. Called "Chronicle Coffee Crunch", it was coffee ice cream loaded with chocolate-covered espresso pieces and nuggets of chocolate-covered honeycomb. The new Brigham's flavor was briefly mentioned in the hour-long anniversary special that aired on January 22, 2007. Proceeds from the product's sales went to benefit many New England-area charities. For several months following the anniversary, Brigham's Chronicle Coffee Crunch was available in many New England supermarket locations, as well at remaining Brigham's restaurants.

== First-generation HD-oriented set ==
Chronicle received a new in-studio set which debuted on May 14, 2007, as a part of WCVB's total conversion to high definition program production that took place on all NewsCenter 5 broadcasts that day as well. This Chronicle set is situated adjacent to the new set for the NewsCenter 5 broadcasts; its introduction gave Chronicle its own unique set for the first time in 14 years (prior to 1993, when Chronicle began sharing a set with NewsCenter 5, the show did have a separate set, noticeably away from the news department). The set contains brick and stucco-like features, with large multi-paned windows containing a "faux view". Anthony Everett described the look on the first night of the set as "if you are in an urban, uptown setting, like a cozy loft". A large HD monitor screen is on the other side of the set, encased in a polished-wood panel.

== Staff ==
=== Current on-air and production staff ===
==== Boston edition ====
- Anthony Everett – anchor
- Shayna Seymour – anchor
- Ted Reinstein – reporter/producer
- Erika Tarantal – reporter/producer (also an anchor/in-studio reporter for WCVB's NewsCenter 5)
- Nicole Estaphan – reporter/producer
- Julie Mehegan - executive producer
- Kimmy Bingham - managing editor
- Sangita Chandra - senior producer
- Ramen Cromwell - producer
- Kathleen Kiely - producer
- Diana Pinzon - producer
- Kendyl Murtaugh - producer
- Jon Rineman - producer
- Bob Oliver- Videographer
- Rich Ward-Videographer
- Jenn Platt-Ure-Videographer
- Deb Therrien - Editor
- Rick LeBlanc- Editor
- David Hayman- Editor
- Vanessa Howland- Editor

==== New Hampshire edition ====
- Fritz Wetherbee
- Maryann M Mroczka
- Mary-Paige Provost
- Todd DiOrio
- Erin Fehlau
- Sean McDonald
- Cindy Jupp-Jones
- Audrey Cox
- Ryan Murphy
- Paul Falco
- Chris Shepherd
- Chris Orr
- Brendan Cahoon

== WCVB Chronicle alumni ==
- Chet Curtis, anchor (January–September 1982, original member; now deceased)
- Donna Downes, anchor/reporter (1982–1983, original member)
- Jeanne Blake, anchor/reporter (1982–1984, original member)
- Mike Barnicle, reporter (1982–2005, original member)
- Arnie Reisman, commentary (January–September 1982, original member)
- Peter Mehegan, anchor (September 1982 – September 2005)
- Tony Kahn, commentary (September 1982 – 1985)
- Chuck Kraemer, contributor (occasional, 1982–1999)
- Mark Mills, contributor (occasional, 1983–2001)
- Mary Richardson, anchor (1984–2010; deceased)
- Andria Hall, anchor/reporter (1985–1993; deceased)
- Liz Brunner, reporter (1993–2002)
- Karen Holmes Ward, reporter (2002–2005)
- J.C. Monahan, anchor (2013–2017; now at WBTS in Boston)
