= Liz Brunner =

American television journalist and entrepreneur

- Born: 1959 (age 66–67); Hartford, Connecticut
- Education: Lawrence University (The Lawrence Conservatory of Music)
- Occupation: executive coach
- Known for: TV news anchor
- Parent(s): Galen E. Russell, Jr. Mary Chacko Russell

Liz Brunner is a former American journalist, an Emmy-winning television news anchor, reporter and the CEO of Brunner Communications. She has published a self-help book, Dare to Own You: Taking Your Authenticity and Dreams into Your Next Chapter. Brunner worked at WCIA-TV Champaign-Urbana, IL, WTVT-TV Tampa, FL, and WCVB-TV, Boston, MA where she was a main news anchor and reporter. In 2013, she set up Brunner Communications, a firm that specializes in media training, communications coaching, and consulting. She is also the host of a podcast, Live Your Best Life with Liz Brunner.

== Early years ==
Brunner was born in Hartford, Connecticut, to Mary (née Chacko) Russell, a retired medical social worker, and Rev. Galen E. Russell Jr., a Pastor of the United Church of Christ. She was raised along with her three younger brothers in Hawaii and Pekin, Illinois. Brunner graduated from Pekin High School and in 1979, competed in the Miss America Pageant as Miss Illinois.

Brunner attended and earned a Bachelor of Music Degree from Lawrence University's Conservatory of Music in Appleton, Wisconsin. Upon graduation, Brunner became a music teacher in Richton Park, Illinois. She sang semi-professionally with the Park Forest Singers and performed for Pope John Paul II at the Vatican.

== Career ==
In 1985, Brunner took her first job in television at the CBS affiliate WCIA-TV in Champaign-Urbana, Illinois, as community relations coordinator. She then joined WTVT-TV, Tampa Bay's CBS affiliate (now a Fox station) as the director of community relations. Within a year, Brunner was named co-anchor of the early morning news. In 1991, Brunner was awarded the "Up and Comers Award" from the American Women in Radio and Television, now the Alliance for Women in Media.

After five years in Tampa, Brunner was hired by WCVB-TV, Channel 5, the ABC affiliate in Boston, as correspondent and fill-in anchor for its news magazine show, Chronicle. Brunner then moved into a full-time role in Channel 5's news department becoming the 5:30 and 11pm anchor. Later, Brunner was selected to fill the space vacated by long-time Boston news anchor, Natalie Jacobson, as the 6pm NewsCenter 5 Anchor.

Brunner was the executive vice-president of American Women in Radio and Television, Boston chapter.

In October 2013, Brunner left her 20-year post as a main anchor for NewsCenter 5, WCVB-TV. She has since launched Brunner Communications, a firm that specializes in media training and communications coaching.

In 2020, Brunner aired the first season of the Live Your Best Life with Liz Brunner podcast, an interview-style show with guests who have re-created their lives. Previous guests have included; Robin Roberts, Jack Canfield, Laura Lynne Jackson, Trent Shelton, Laura Gassner Otting, and Jon Dorenbos.

Brunner released her first book through GracePoint Publishing in November of 2021, Dare to Own You: Taking Your Authenticity and Dreams into Your Next Chapter. The memoir follows Brunner's career journey along with the challenges faced and impactful lessons she learned through her upbringing and being a woman in her field. In 2023, the book was awarded Silver/ Second Place in the "Self-Help" category and a Finalist in the "Memoir/ Biography" category in the annual Feathered Quill Book Awards. It was recommended by Forbes as one of "Four New Books To Help You Regain Momentum On New Year’s Resolutions" and one of "5 Books For The Career-Minded Professionals On Your Holiday Gift List."
