= Willie Whistle =

- Willie Whistle
- Created by: Dick Beach
- Portrayed by: Dick Beach

In-universe information
- Occupation: Clown

Willie Whistle was a local Boston children's television character of the late 20th century. He hosted a local children's show from 1967 to 1987.

Willie Whistle, a seagoing clown, was played by Dick Beach (September 5, 1928 - December 18, 2018). Beach created the character of Salty the Clown as a fill-in for a local Toledo, Ohio show, Fun Farm. In 1960, he was given his own show, The Adventures of Salty and Friends. The Salty character featured a tiny whistle sitting on Beach's tongue that changed his voice to a high-pitched squeak. He performed skits with another character, Captain Cotton, and introduced cartoons.

Beach was recruited by Boston's new UHF channel, WSBK-TV (UHF channel 38) to host a show there, starting in 1967. He kept the Salty character, but was required to rename it since Salty was the nickname of a recent Massachusetts senator (Leverett Saltonstall), and a neighboring station in Rhode Island already had its own children's-TV personality, Salty Brine (Walter Bryant). The name Willie Whistle was chosen. Beach was also promotions director at the station.

Willie Whistle thrived in the greater Boston market, despite some of his squeaky speech being so unintelligible that he had an offscreen interpreter (staff announcer Dana Hersey) improvising back-and-forth banter. The actor Beach often seemed genuinely confused as the end credits rolled, looking from one camera to another, not being sure whether he was still on the air as the camera repeatedly zoomed in and out on his face.

The character was popular enough that WSBK filmed a half-hour special, Willie Whistle's Christmas, in and around Boston. The story of Willie the clown and a forlorn little girl, it premiered in Boston on December 21, 1979, as a primetime, Saturday-night special, and WSBK's parent company Storer Broadcasting offered the program to other stations in its network. The attempt at playing Willie for pathos misfired, and no further specials were made.

The Willie Whistle character aired in Boston for 20 years, until 1987, when Beach retired for health reasons. Beach died on December 18, 2018, at the age of 90.
