= Harvey Leonard =

American television meteorologist

- Born: Harvey Leonard Moskowitz
- Education: City College of New York (B.S., Meteorology, 1970); New York University (M.S. Meteorology)
- Occupation: TV news meteorologist
- Spouse: Lorraine

Harvey Leonard is a former chief meteorologist on WCVB-TV Channel 5 in Boston, Massachusetts. For 25 years, Leonard was previously best known as a meteorologist at Boston's WHDH-TV (Channel 7).

== Education ==
Leonard earned his B.S. in meteorology from the City College of New York in 1970 and an M.S. in meteorology from New York University,

== Career ==
He began his career as a meteorologist for Universal Weather, Inc. preparing forecasts for aviation and industry. He also taped reports for radio stations in New York and Connecticut as well as teaching at New York University.

He worked as chief meteorologist for WPRI-TV in Providence, Rhode Island for three years.

Leonard first came to Boston TV in May 1977 at Channel 7, then known as WNAC-TV. For the first few years, he was a staff meteorologist. By the time the station was sold to New England Television and became WNEV-TV in 1982 (the same ownership would rename it again to WHDH in 1990), Leonard became chief meteorologist, the role he would hold there for the next 20 years. During his long tenure at Channel 7, Leonard was named "Best Meteorologist" by Boston Magazine in 1984, 1986, 1988, and 1992. Leonard was also a meteorologist for radio station WROR-FM in 1980.

He left WHDH-TV in April 2002 and joined WCVB-TV that same year. After the retirement of then-chief meteorologist Dick Albert in 2009, Leonard was once again promoted to chief meteorologist, this time at WCVB. He retired from WCVB on May 25, 2022.

In late 2010, he contributed to the book, Extreme New England Weather, with his story of the Northeastern United States blizzard of 1978.

Leonard is an avid outdoorsman and lecturer at Harvard, MIT, Boston University, and Boston Medical Center. He is a charter member of the National Weather Association. He's been called the dean of Boston meteorologists.

== Personal life ==
He was born November 10, 1949, He lives in Natick, Massachusetts with his wife and family. They have two daughters and five grandchildren.

== Honors ==
- 1984, 1986, 1988, and 1992 "Best Meteorologist" by Boston Magazine
- 1999 Fellow of the American Meteorological Society
- 1999 winner of the Award for Outstanding Service by a Broadcast Meteorologist from the American Meteorological Society
- 2003 Silver Circle Award from NATSNE (National Academy of Arts and Sciences New England Chapter) for more than twenty-five years of broadcast excellence
- Two New England Emmy Awards for outstanding achievement in television weathercasting

== Publications ==
- Judge, Josh; et al. Extreme New England Weather, Greenfield, New Hampshire : SciArt Media, 1st Edition, November 6, 2010. ISBN 978-0982351291 (Harvey Leonard was one of the contributors to the book)
