= Fritz Wetherbee =

American journalist (born 1936)

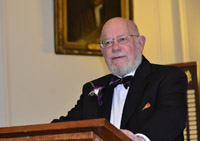
- Wetherbee in 2011
- Born: Fred Minot Wetherbee II; July 3, 1936 (age 90); Nashua, New Hampshire, U.S.
- Education: Keene State College
- Occupations: Filmmaker; television host; writer; journalist; author
- Years active: 1962–2025
- Organization(s): WMUR, New Hampshire Public Broadcasting

Fred "Fritz" Minot Wetherbee II (born July 3, 1936) is an American journalist, television host, writer, filmmaker, and author. Referred to as "The Voice of New Hampshire", he is best known as the host of "Fritz Wetherbee's New Hampshire", a segment of New Hampshire Chronicle which ran from 2001 to 2025. Prior to his segment, Wetherbee hosted various programs on New Hampshire Public Television, including New Hampshire Crossroads from 1985 to 1995. Wetherbee has written several books on the history of his native New Hampshire. He has also provided voice work for films such as Baseball (1994) and The Ten Commandments of Banquet Serving (2023).

Wetherbee has won numerous awards for his work, including five Boston/New England Emmy Awards and the New Hampshire Governor's Arts Award in 2011. In 2025, Wetherbee officially retired from broadcasting.

== Early life ==
Fred Minot Wetherbee II was born On July 3, 1936 in Nashua, New Hampshire, to Frederick Minot Wetherbee and Mary Catheryn Wetherbee (née Butler). According to a 2025 segment on New Hampshire Chronicle, Wetherbee "was born at half past four in the afternoon on a Friday" while his parents lived at 19 Union Street in Milford, New Hampshire. Wetherbee is the oldest of five children and claims to be "a 12th generation Yankee", with a 2008 genealogy study on Wetherbee confirming his ancestors immigrated to the United States from England in the 1670s. Wetherbee grew up in Milford and, after graduating high school, enlisted in the United States Army, becoming a scout in the 3rd Cavalry Regiment at Fort Meade. During this time, Wetherbee recited poetry for an Army talent show, securing him a spot in the Second Army Show Mobile, which led to him being featured on The Ed Sullivan Show in 1959 as part of Sullivan's yearly salutes to soldiers.

In the early 1960s, Wetherbee moved to New York City, later stating that he became "a self-professed beatnik...I played the coffee houses in New York, wrote all this poetry. It was a kind of slam poetry that I wrote."

== Career ==
=== Early journalism ===
In 1962, Wetherbee moved from New York City to Jaffrey, New Hampshire, where he began working for The Monadnock Ledger. Originally, Wetherbee was hired to sell advertisements, but he later recounted:

"I had come [to The Monadnock Ledger] for a job as a salesman selling ads, but there was a drowning in Fitzwilliam. I was a photographer; when I was in high school I developed my own pictures and that kind of thing. I was crazy for photography, and the editor of the paper sent me over to cover the drowning and he said, 'Write a story on it, a 'color story.'"

The positive reaction to the story earned Wetherbee a job at the paper, where he worked for nearly seven years. During this time, Wetherbee also attended Keene State College, taking classes in journalism and English before graduating in 1963. While in college, Wetherbee also wrote for The Keene Sentinel.

Wetherbee also began writing for local radio stations. In 1975, he was hired as a news editor for WSCV/WSLE-FM in Peterborough, New Hampshire, eventually serving as the station's news director and general manager until leaving in 1984.

=== Television career ===
In 1985, Wetherbee became the host of New Hampshire Crossroads, a local interest program focusing on New Hampshire culture that aired on New Hampshire Public Broadcasting (NHPBS). Wetherbee had been working for NHPBS in Durham, New Hampshire, for several years, serving as a cameraman for the program, when he was asked to host. Wetherbee served as the program's host until 1995.

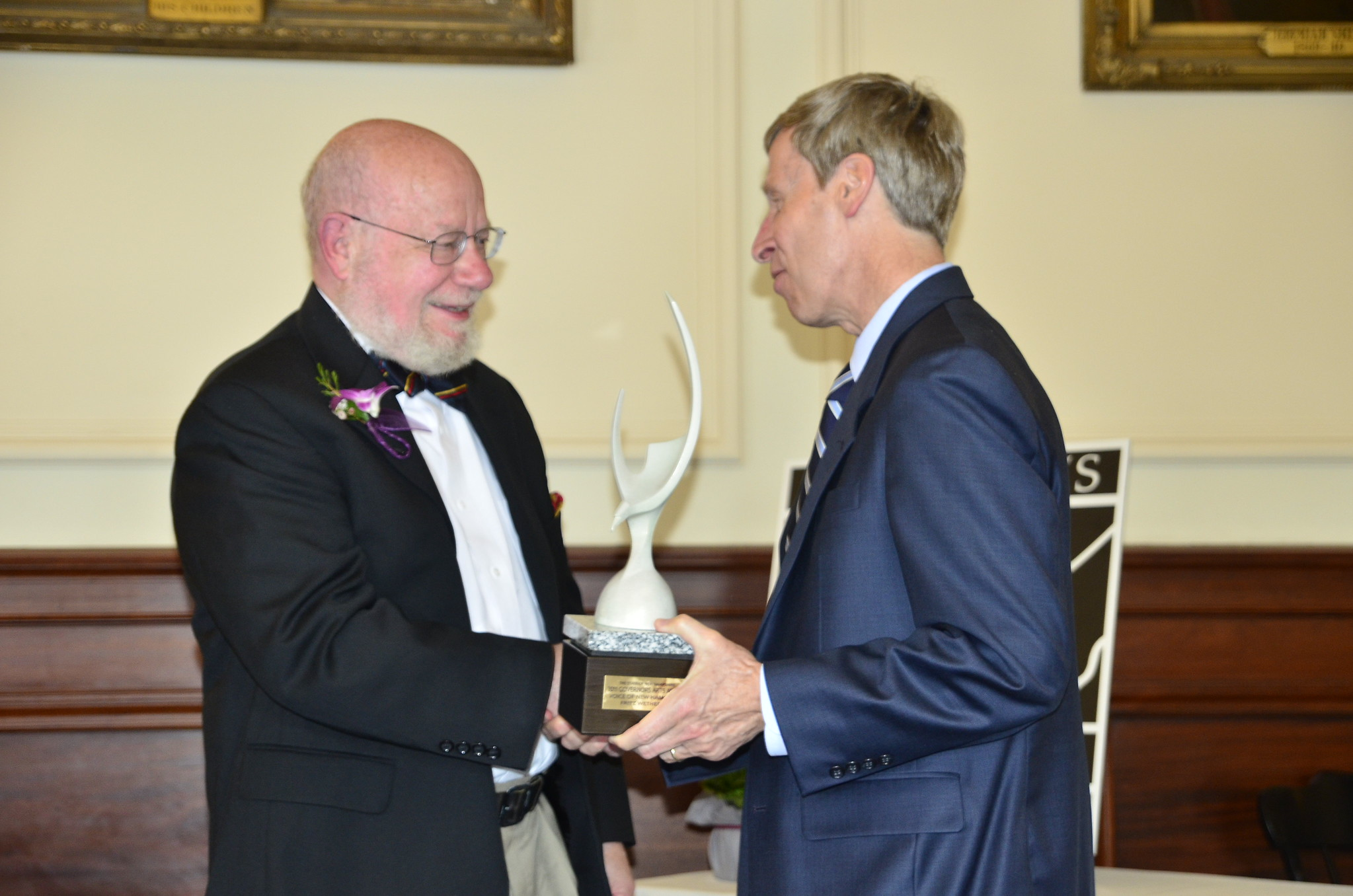
Wetherbee (left) receiving the Governor's Award from New Hampshire Governor John Lynch in 2011. Wetherbee's citation for the award referenced "his unswerving commitment to preserving and exploring cultural identity, and doing so with grace, humor and wit."

In 2001, Chronicle began airing New Hampshire Chronicle on WMUR-TV in Manchester. New Hampshire Chronicle was the first spin-off Chronicle, a television program focused on local culture and history from across New England; New Hampshire Chronicle focused solely on New Hampshire. Wetherbee was given his own segment on the program entitled "Fritz Wetherbee's New Hampshire". The segments featured Wetherbee explaining New Hampshire history, usually filmed on-site in locations across the state. The segment was one of the longest-running segments on the program, and brought Wetherbee notice across the state, earning him status as a local legend. Between 2001 and 2025, Wetherbee reportedly recorded 5,000 segments for the program. For his work with New Hampshire Chronicle, Wetherbee earned various awards, including five New England/Boston Emmy Awards for Outstanding Achievement as On Camera Talent.

While Wetherbee's stories were generally about history and culture, he would also record segments in which he regaled humorous fictional stories about an "old friend" named "Binky Sears"; the absurdity of Wetherbee's "Binky Sears" stories has spawned local memes. Wetherbee's segments also frequently featured Wetherbee wearing a bow tie, which became associated with Wetherbee by fans.

On February 6, 2025, WMUR announced Wetherbee would be retiring from broadcasting at the end of the month. Wetherbee stated "I'm an old guy. Yeah, I'm sad." In the announcement, WMUR and Wetherbee announced that every one of Wetherbee's stories would be uploaded to WMUR's website for archival and entertainment purposes, a process that began later in 2025. WMUR aired a tribute to Wetherbee on February 24, 2025, the last episode featuring a new segment by Wetherbee. The tribute included video messages thanking Wetherbee from people such as Tom Bergeron, Maggie Hassan, and John Lynch. In his final segment, Wetherbee stated, "well, there's a book to write," teasing an upcoming memoir.

=== Voice work ===
Noted for his distinctive Yankee accent, Wetherbee has provided voice work for various media projects. Most notably, he provided narration for the first episode of Ken Burns' documentary Baseball (1994). Wetherbee has also acted in several short films, including The Norman Rockwell Code (2006), Bighorn (2010), and the animated film The Ten Commandments of Banquet Serving (2023).

== Writing ==
Wetherbee has published several books compiling his stories from "Fritz Wetherbee's New Hampshire". Milestone (2012) marked 1,000 published stories of New Hampshire history by Wetherbee, with the book's cover reading "With this collection Fritz reaches his goal of 1,000 stories about New Hampshire!" Wetherbee's only non-history book, Speak N'Hampsha Like a Native: A short course of the language and them that speak it, ayuh (1984) is a humorous guide to the state's regional dialect.

== Personal life ==
Wetherbee has discussed his early life and childhood in several of his segments for New Hampshire Chronicle, expressing regret for his relationship with his mother, who died in 1966 from alcoholism. Wetherbee stated in a 2024 segment that "she was drunk most of the time, and I was sometimes mean to her, but I also owe her." Wetherbee currently lives in Acworth, New Hampshire, with his wife, Laura.

Wetherbee is an avid lover of poetry, and has quoted the work of Robert Frost – who spent time living in New Hampshire – in several segments of "Fritz Wetherbee's New Hampshire". A bibliophile, Wetherbee also claims to own "200 – maybe 300 town histories" for towns in New Hampshire, many of which he references for his segments. He also owns 175 bow ties.

== Awards and legacy ==
Wetherbee is often lauded as a highly-respected figure in New Hampshire television, being called "The Voice of New Hampshire" by the New Hampshire State Council on the Arts. In 2011, he was awarded the Council's "Voice of New Hampshire" citation at the Governor's Arts Awards. In 2013, Wetherbee was awarded the Broadcaster of the Year Award from The New Hampshire Association of Broadcasters and a Silver Circle Award from the Academy of Television Arts and Sciences Boston/New England Chapter. Rivier University and New England College have both conferred Wetherbee honorary Doctor of Humane Letters degrees, in 2009 and 2013 respectively.

In 2021, New Hampshire Chronicle producer Maryann Mroczka called Wetherbee Chronicle's "unofficial trademark". Former New Hampshire Governor John Lynch called Wetherbee "another wonderful icon in New Hampshire", comparing him to the Old Man of the Mountain and Mount Washington. Senator Maggie Hassan called Wetherbee "the trusted voice and friendly face of New Hampshire history for generations now of Granite Staters."

In 2005, the New Hampshire Fisher Cats produced a limited-edition bobblehead of Wetherbee, which New Hampshire Public Radio humorously called "perhaps most important" of his accomplishments.

== Published works ==
- Fritz Wetherbee's New Hampshire (Plaidswede Publishing; January 1, 2005), ISBN 9780975521656
- I'll Tell You the Story: More of Fritz Wetherbee's New Hampshire (Plaidswede Publishing; January 1, 2006), ISBN 0975521691
- Fritz: More Stories From New Hampshire Chronicle (Plaidswede Publishing; January 1, 2007), ISBN 0979078458
- Taken for Granite: Even More Stories From New Hampshire Chronicle (Plaidswede Publishing; January 1, 2008), ISBN 0979078482
- In Good Company (Plaidswede Publishing; January 1, 2009), ISBN 0984065059
- As Seen On TV - More Stories From New Hampshire Chronicle (Plaidswede Publishing; January 1, 2010), ISBN 0984065083
- Fritz Wetherbee's New Hampshire Rocks - As Seen on WMUR's New Hampshire Chronicle (Plaidswede Publishing; January 1, 2011), ISBN 0983740038
- Milestone (Plaidswede Publishing; January 1, 2012), ISBN 0983740070

== Filmography ==
=== Film ===
Year	Title	Role
2006	The Norman Rockwell Code	The Curator
2008	Bighorn	The Shopkeeper
2023	The Ten Commandments of Banquet Serving	Fritzy

=== Television ===
Year	Title	Role	Notes
1985-1995	New Hampshire Crossroads	Host (self)	
1991	The Works of Robert Frost	Narrator	
1994	Baseball	Narrator	
2001-2025	New Hampshire Chronicle	Host (self)	Host of "Fritz Wetherbee's New Hampshire" segment
