= J. C. Monahan =

American newscaster

- Born: Jennifer Catherine Monahan; Newton, Massachusetts
- Education: University of Maine (B.A., Broadcast Journalism, 1994); Mississippi State University (Broadcast Meteorology Program)
- Occupations: broadcast journalist, meteorologist
- Known for: anchoring, reporting and weather forecasting in Boston, Massachusetts

Jennifer Catherine "J. C." Monahan is an American newscaster for NBC's Boston affiliate WBTS-CD, which she joined in June 2017.

== Early life and education ==
A native of Newton, Massachusetts, she attended the University of Maine from which she graduated with a B.A. in Broadcast Journalism in 1994. She went on to graduate from Mississippi State University's Broadcast Meteorology program.

== Career ==
She began her career as News Director for WZON in Bangor, Maine. It was there that she earned awards from the Associated Press and Maine Association of Broadcasters (for Best Radio Newscast and Best Series Reporting).

Monahan then moved south to become the weekend forecaster and entertainment reporter for WPXT-TV in Portland, Maine, before serving as the weekend meteorologist for NECN.

In April 2006, it was announced that Monahan was pregnant, due in October. On March 28, 2012, Monahan gave birth to a second baby girl.

On April 8, 2013, it was announced that Monahan would be switching roles at WCVB-TV, leaving her meteorology position in favor of joining Chronicle as a permanent co-anchor. Monahan provides the show's existing anchor Anthony Everett with a full-time co-host for the first time since Chronicle veteran Mary Richardson retired in 2010. In the weather department, Monahan was replaced by former WFXT meteorologist Cindy Fitzgibbon, who joined WCVB in April 2013, at first on a substitute basis. On May 20, 2013, Fitzgibbon started her permanent position on NewsCenter 5 EyeOpener, while Monahan continued to forecast for NewsCenter 5 Midday. It was originally stated that Monahan would move to Chronicle in June, but on May 21 it was revealed that her start date had been moved up to May 23. After Monahan's move, Fitzgibbon also added the midday news to her weather duties.

On February 19, 2017, it was reported that Monahan would leave WCVB at the end of her contract later that year. WBTS-CD announced her hiring by the station in June 2017.

== Awards and professional affiliations ==
Monahan is a member of the American Meteorological Society and the National Weather Association. In 2004, she was awarded the AMS Seal of Approval in recognition of her professionalism in weather forecasting and reporting.
