= Frank Avruch =

American television host

Frank Bernard Avruch (May 21, 1928 – March 20, 2018) was an American television host who played Bozo the Clown on Boston television from 1959 to 1970. His performances were the only ones to reach a national audience (as Bozo's Big Top).

== Early life ==
Avruch was born in Boston and grew up in Winthrop, Massachusetts. He was named best actor at Winthrop High School and acted in Summer stock theatre in Gloucester, Massachusetts. However, his mother objected to an acting career and he enrolled in Missouri School of Journalism. He later returned to Boston and in 1949 he graduated from the Boston University College of Communication with a bachelor's degree in journalism.

His first broadcasting job came at WVOM. He then worked at WNEB in Worcester, Massachusetts, before returning to Boston. In 1957 he married Betty F. Greenman. In 1959 they purchased a home in Newton Centre, Massachusetts. They had two sons.

== Bozo the Clown ==
Avruch joined WHDH-TV in 1957 as an announcer. Merchandiser Larry Harmon, then marketing Bozo the Clown, licensed the character to local TV stations, with each station pressing one of its staff members into service to wear the Bozo makeup and costume (Bob Bell in Chicago, Willard Scott in Washington, D. C., etc.). In 1959, WHDH purchased the local rights to Bozo from Harmon and assigned Frank Avruch to play the role. Avruch was personally more dignified and less raucous than his clown character, so his demeanor as Bozo was more of a genial master of ceremonies than a slapstick buffoon, and his sincerity endeared him to both kids and parents. Bozo the Clown aired in Boston on weekday mornings and Saturday afternoons. Avruch left the low-comedy antics to featured performer Caroll Spinney, who played nine roles on the show including "Mr. Lion" and "Grandma Nellie."

In April 1964 WHDH produced a special program in color, World's Fair Fun with Bozo, filmed at the New York World's Fair. Avruch appeared in his Bozo costume, touring the various exhibits. Boston Globe columnist Percy Shain applauded Avruch's onscreen performance and offscreen narration, but wondered "why this first-class program should have been held back until late October, with the fair closed and more or less a dead issue at the moment." The film also showed the inaugural ceremonies at the UNICEF Pavilion. Avruch went on to tour the world as Bozo, performing for UNICEF. He was given a United Nations Award for his work with children.

In 1966, Larry Harmon decided to replace all of the local versions of Bozo with a single nationally syndicated show, and chose Avruch to serve as Bozo. Avruch taped 180 episodes of Bozo’s Big Top for national syndication. Avruch was still working as a staff announcer for WHDH, and interviewed entertainment figures for Dateline: Boston.

In July 1970 the South Shore Music Circus theater in Cohasset, Massachusetts hired Frank Avruch to appear as Bozo for a special Saturday-morning series of live appearances. Seven weeks later, on August 18, WHDH-TV canceled Bozo in favor of a morning news broadcast. Following the cancellation, Avruch chose to remain in Boston rather than playing Bozo in another city.

== The Great Entertainment and "Man About Town" ==
WHDH lost its broadcasting license in 1972, when the FCC prohibited ownership of multiple media outlets in the same city (the station was owned by a Boston newspaper). Its successor was WCVB-TV, which hired Frank Avruch -- long familiar to viewers as a "Channel 5" personality -- as the station's booth announcer, performing on-air commercials and promotional announcements. WCVB acquired the Metro-Goldwyn-Mayer library of feature films and, rather than just showing the films, decided to showcase each presentation as a special event, under the series title The Great Entertainment. Frank Avruch hosted the show, which aired at 11:30 p.m. on Saturday and Sunday nights and on Sunday afternoons. Avruch, dressed formally in a tuxedo, stood in front of a movie-theater set, alongside a sandwich sign prominently displaying a photo of the movie's star. He would appear throughout each broadcast between commercial breaks, offering anecdotes and trivia about each film. The program's popularity inspired Boston's UHF stations WSBK-TV and WQTV to create similar programs – WSBK's The Movie Loft hosted by its own staff announcer Dana Hersey and WQTV's Those Magnificent Talkies hosted by Earl Ziff. In 1982, Avruch also hosted Frank's Favorite Scenes, aired at 1:00 a.m. after the Saturday-night movie, which showed scenes from films aired on Great Entertainment.

In 1974, Avruch began co-hosting WCVB-TV's Sunday public-affairs program, known by various names during its run including Sunday Open House, New England Sunday, Sunday Best, and Sunday. He also hosted a weekly cultural news report called "Man About Town".

In 1986, Avruch suffered a mild heart attack. He returned to the air after only 17 days. In 1992, WCVB-TV cut Sunday from a weekly program to a monthly one. That December the station, finding it difficult to compete with cable networks -- especially after Turner Broadcasting acquired the MGM library that WCVB-TV had long been using -- canceled The Great Entertainment. Avruch remained with the station as its announcer and an on-air personality for special events and occasional news stories. He retired from the station in 1995, but continued to appear on the station's’ various telethons and represented the station at various public events.

== Later life and death ==
Following his retirement Avruch launched his own website, "Frank Avruch: Boston's Man About Town" (www.bostonman.com) which, like the “Man About Town” segments he did for WCVB-TV news, provided information about special events, hotels, restaurants, museums, and theaters in Boston. He also hosted a classic movie series at the Wang Center for the Performing Arts and the Coolidge Corner Theatre, did voice-over work, and represented WCVB-TV at public functions. In 2007 he was inducted into the inaugural class of the Massachusetts Broadcasters Hall of Fame. The Avruches spent their later years in Boston.

Frank Avruch died of heart disease on March 20, 2018, in his Boston home. He was 89 years old.
