= Susan Wornick =

American television journalist and host

Susan Wornick (born December 31, 1949) is a former American television journalist and current TV host and spokesperson, best known as a longtime reporter and anchor, from 1981 until 2014, at WCVB-TV in Boston.

Since May 2014, Wornick and ex-husband Bob Lobel have served as on-air talent in hosting segments on MeTV Boston, the digital subchannel of WCVB which airs classic television programs. Wornick and Lobel also host many New England-area charity events, and have appeared as TV commercial spokespeople for various Boston-area businesses. she splits her time between Stuart, Florida, and Mashpee, Massachusetts, and is "partnered with Rubino and Liang helping people plan for their retirement."

== Early life and education ==
Born in the Bronx, NY and raised in Natick, Massachusetts, she graduated from Emerson College in 1971 with a BA. She received an Honorary Doctorate of Humane Letters from Becker College in Worcester, Massachusetts. She said “the only reason I went to college at all is that my parents wanted me to be the first in my family to get a degree.“ She intended to major in speech pathology and audiology but ended up majoring in psychology with minors in English and History. She credits two Natick High School teachers with her success.

== Career ==
From 1979 to 1981, Wornick was a reporter and anchor at WHDH Radio. She also worked at WBZ radio, winning AP and UPI awards.

Wornick joined WCVB in 1981 as a general assignment reporter. She was named midday news anchor in February 1989 until she stepped down in February 2014. In July 1989, she replaced Paula Lyons as WCVB's consumer reporter, a role she also held until her retirement in 2014. In the 1990s, her regular consumer advocacy segment, "Buyer Beware", became a staple on WCVB's NewsCenter 5 broadcasts. Wornick was one of the founding members of Team 5 Investigates, WCVB's investigative unit, in 2006.

Wornick has been a vocal supporter of a Massachusetts law to shield journalists when they try to protect confidential sources. In 1985, she was almost jailed for refusing to name her sources while working on a story alleging corruption within the Revere, Massachusetts Police Department.

== Awards ==
Her awards include three regional Emmy Awards, the Silver Gavel Award from the American Bar Association (ABA) (1991), the Silver Circle Award from the National Academy of Television Arts & Sciences and the "Embracing The Legacy (of Robert F. Kennedy) award at the Kennedy Library in recognition of her work in protecting children" She will be inducted into the Massachusetts Broadcasters Hall of Fame September 12, 2014.

== Charitable work ==
Charities she has supported include Rosie’s Place, Catholic Charities, the Massachusetts Coalition for the Homeless, the Natick VNA and Rodman Rides for Kids.For The Love of Life, created by the late Patrick Murphy, Supporting those with Aids
