= Professor Lyrical =

American rapper and professor

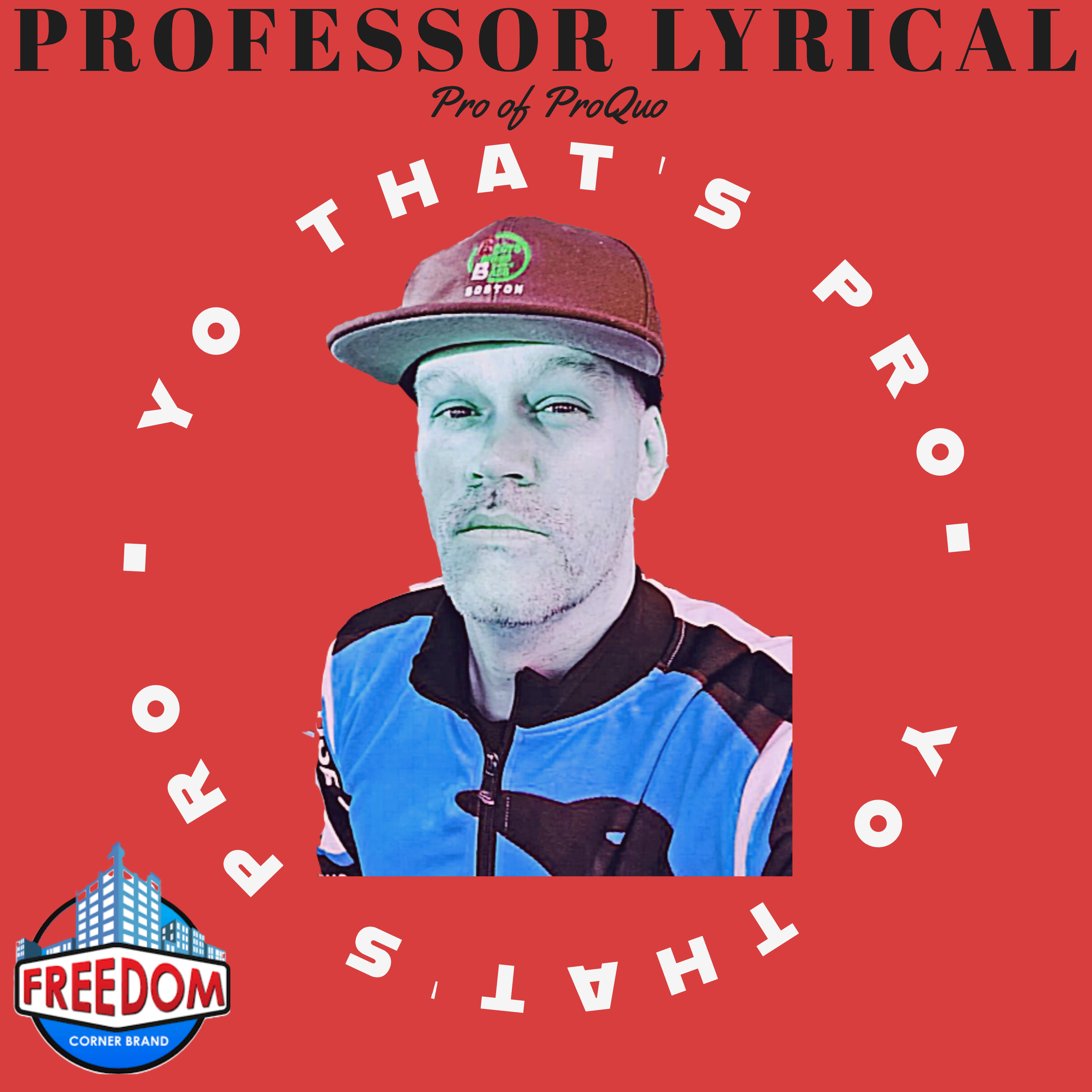
- Professor Lyrical cover of Yo That's Pro

Background information
- Origin: Lowell, Massachusetts, U.S.
- Genre: rap spoken word
- Occupations: Rapper & Professor
- Years active: 1989–present
- Labels: Dotted "i" Music & Entertainment (D.i.M.E.), The Orchard, Fat Sam Music, Freedom Corner Brand, Blaze the World Records, Sony Music Entertainment
- Website: www.professorlyrical.com

Professor Lyrical is a Hip hop artist from Lowell, Massachusetts. He is also a university professor who was employed full-time for several years at Northeastern University in Boston, Massachusetts, as an Assistant Teaching Professor (Mathematics). He attended Lowell and Chelmsford Public Schools, graduating from Chelmsford High School, before attending college at the University of Massachusetts at Lowell. Pro, then known as "Lord Plourde," would later teach at Lowell High School at the start of his career as an educator. After moving to Cambridge, MA, he would finish his masters degree requirements by taking his last few math courses at Harvard University, which he would later transfer back to UML for his MS in mathematics and later earned his doctorate at Northeastern University.

Lyrical has been covered extensively by local and national media for his music and math ability, as well as his unique "side-hustle" as an actual professor reflected in his moniker. He is now an associate professor of mathematics at the University of the District of Columbia where he also serves as a Director of Faculty Development (for UDCCC) and lives in the DC area. He appeared on Washington, DC, News4 at 5 (NBC) on April 22, 2019, in an interview that documented how he used music and Hip Hop to reach students more effectively in the math courses he teaches. In September 2017, he won the "Pitch and Flow" rap battle at the Kennedy Center, hosted by MC Lyte and DJ Dee Nice, where dope rappers were paired with socially conscious entrepreneurs pitching their company stories through the rap performances. He is known as a "clean and conscious rapper," however some of his earlier songs contained occasional profanity and touched on violent issues, which he is now known to speak out against, with the occasional exception of when competing in battle rap. He raps as "Pro" in the rap duo "ProQuo" with Jay "Quokane" Cruz and the duo also host a live-stream program called "The ProQuo Show" primarily through their social media sites. Their debut album, "Instant Brotherhood" was released in the summer of 2020 via Dime/Freedom Corner Brand/Sony Orchard. Professor Lyrical's 2005 album iNFiNiTi won for album of the year in the 2006 M.I.C. Hip Hop awards in Boston.

Before he was a full-time faculty member at Northeastern University, he was an adjunct professor at several other colleges in Massachusetts, primarily in the areas of Math and entertainment (including a Hip Hop course at Lasell College and entertainment courses at Bay State College). In the mid-1990s through the early 2000s he competed in several major freestyle battles, such as the Battle for World Supremacy in NYC and the Universal Zulu Nation East Coast Finals; he went on to win many more in the years to follow. He is part of the Mass Industry Committee, which also created 617Live TV. Lyrical has filled in for fellow Boston rapper Akrobatik on JAM'N 94.5 to perform the daily "SPORTS RAP UP" (part of the highly rated Morning Show) on occasion when Akrobatik has been unavailable. He has appeared on many different radio segments, television shows, news programs and in movies. On March 21, 2018, he appeared as "Lyrical" as a contestant on Wheel of Fortune with his wife who is also a singer.

He has taught courses at Bay State College, New England Arts Institute, Lesley University, and Wentworth Institute of Technology. His (8/2013) album, Put Em All To Shame is an album that comes with a 200-page book; it is known as "The World's First Albook." In 2020, Professor Lyrical, published a single and video for "House of Lies," a politics laced break-up letter with a twist ending shot in Washington, DC.

He received a BS and an MS (Mathematics) from UMass-Lowell and a doctorate from Northeastern University. Professor Lyrical has spoken and performed at numerous institutions and "Ted Talk" style events where he raps, lectures, and performs spoken word poetry and speaks interactively with the audience.

== Discography ==
=== Albums ===
- iNFiNiTi {as Lyrical} (2005 & re-released to all platforms as Professor Lyrical 2026)
- The College Project (Through the eyes of Pupils) (2009)
- Put Em All To Shame {w/DJ Shame} (2013)
- The Lecture Series (Spoken Word Album) (2016)
- iNSTANT BROTHERHOOD {as ProQuo: Pro Lyrical & Jay "Quokane" Cruz} (2021)
- Dr. Plourde {w/Jay Johnson} (2025)

=== Singles ===
- Twist on Dis {as Col Medina w/X-Caliber} (1989)
- Dance with the Rhythm {as X-Caliber: Fee, Lord Plourde & DJ Zulu} (1992)
- Butta Messenga b/w Le Miserables {as X-Caliber: Fee, Lord Plourde, Ruby Shabazz, & Syntax} (1997)
- Brand Name Women b/w Butta Messenga Remix & Don’t Make It Hard (Le Miz II) {as X-Caliber: Fee, Lord Plourde, Ruby Shabazz, & Syntax} (1998)
- They All Call Lyrical b/w Bring it to the Streets {as "Lyrical" Lord Plourde} "(2000)
- Why b/w Don’t Hurt Em {as Invasion (Lyrical, Presence, & Sickmen)} (2002)
- Salt b/w SickIllTypeIsh (Sickmen ft. Illin’ P) {as Invasion (Lyrical, Presence, & Sickmen)} (2002)
- The Focuz Is Back b/w Come With Me” ft. NV & Lyrically Rippin’ ft. Rip Shop {as Lyrical} (2006)
- Get Lyrical (2013)
- Pain Won't Last ft. Christine Scolari (2016)
- House of Lies (2020)
- Homework (2021)
- Final Fire {as ProQuo: Pro Lyrical & Jay "Quokane" Cruz} (2021)
- Yo That's Pro (2022)
- Back in the Dayz {as X-Cal: -via Fee the Evolutionist- ft. Pro Lyrical & Ruby Shabazz (X-Cal)} (2022)
- Dark Poetry {from the feature film, Montreal Girls} (2022)
- Maskoraid (2022)
- No (2023)
- Gravity Remix {as ProQuo: Pro Lyrical & Jay "Quokane" Cruz} (2023)
- Hard to Breathe ft. Jennifer Msumba (2023)
- Brand Name Women (remastered) {as X-Cal: -via Fee the Evolutionist- ft. Pro Lyrical w/Ruby Shabazz (X-Cal)} (2024)
- Butta Messenga (remastered) {as X-Caliber: Fee the Evolutionist & Pro Lyrical w/Ruby Shabazz, & Syntax} (2024)
- J Like (2024)
- Steph ft. LarsY Vega$ (2026)

=== 12 inch singles ===
- Twist on Dis {as Col Medina w/X-Caliber "Cruz Master Fee, Joey B., Lord Plourde, & The Heat"} (1989)
- Butta Messenga b/w Le Miserables {as X-Caliber} (1997)
- Brand Name Woman b/w Butta Messenga Remix & Don't Make It Hard (Le Miz II) {as X-Caliber} (1998)
- Why b/w Don't Hurt Em {as Invasion (Lyrical, Presence, & Sickmen)} (2002)
- Salt b/w SickIllTypeIsh (Sickmen ft. Illin’ P) {as Invasion (Lyrical, Presence, & Sickmen)} (2002)
- The Focuz Is Back b/w Come With Me ft. NV & Lyrically Rippin’ ft. Rip Shop {as Lyrical} (2006)
