= WCVB-TV =

Television station in Boston

- Boston, Massachusetts; United States
- Channels: Digital: 33 (UHF); Virtual: 5
- Branding: WCVB Channel 5; WCVB NewsCenter 5

Programming
- Affiliations: 5.1: ABC; for others, see § Subchannels

Ownership
- Owner: Hearst Television; (Hearst Stations Inc.)
- Sister stations: WMUR-TV

History
- First air date: March 19, 1972
- Former channel numbers: Analog: 5 (VHF, 1972–2009); Digital: 20 (UHF, 1998–2019)
- Call sign meaning: Channel V (Roman numeral 5, former analog channel) in Boston

Technical information
- Licensing authority: FCC
- Facility ID: 65684
- ERP: 922 kW
- HAAT: 388.3 m (1,274 ft)
- Transmitter coordinates: 42°18′37″N 71°14′12″W

Links
- Public license information: Public file; LMS
- Website: www.wcvb.com

WCVB-TV (channel 5) is a television station in Boston, Massachusetts, United States, affiliated with ABC and owned by Hearst Television. The station's studios are located on TV Place (off Gould Street near the I-95/MA 128/Highland Avenue interchange) in Needham, Massachusetts, and its transmitter is located on Cedar Street, also in Needham, on a tower shared with several other television and radio stations.

Nearby Manchester, New Hampshire, is considered part of the Boston media market, making WCVB-TV part of a nominal duopoly with WMUR-TV (channel 9), that city's ABC affiliate; however, the two stations maintain separate operations.

WCVB is also one of six Boston television stations that are carried by satellite provider Bell Satellite TV and fiber optic television provider Bell Fibe TV in Canada. Since 2010, midday and weekend late newscasts, along with World News Now, are overlaid with Canadian paid programming on those providers; however, the latter has carried the normal WCVB-TV feed in recent years.

== History ==
=== Prior history of channel 5 in Boston (1957–1972) ===
The channel 5 allocation in Boston was first occupied by the original WHDH-TV, which signed on the air on November 26, 1957. The station was owned by the Boston Herald-Traveler Corporation, along with WHDH radio (850 AM, now WEEI; and 94.5 FM, now WJMN). It was originally an ABC affiliate, but switched to CBS in 1961.

However, almost as soon as it signed on, the Federal Communications Commission (FCC) began investigating allegations of impropriety in the granting of the television station's construction permit. This touched off a struggle that lasted 15 years. As a result, WHDH-TV never had a license renewal period lasting more than six months at a time (most television licenses at the time lasted for three years). In 1969, a local group, Boston Broadcasters, won a construction permit to build a new station on channel 5 under the callsign of WCVB-TV after promising to air more local programming than any other station in the United States at the time. The new channel 5 needed to have a different call sign (due to FCC rules at the time that stated that TV and radio stations in the same market, but with different ownership were required to have different call signs). It was also critical of the combination of the Herald-Traveler and WHDH-AM-FM-TV. Herald-Traveler Corporation fought the decision in court, but lost in 1972 and Boston Broadcasters was awarded a full license. The local group was led by acoustic expert Leo Beranek and communications lawyer Nathan H. David.

=== WCVB history (1972–present) ===
==== Beginnings ====
The original WHDH-TV signed off for the last time on March 18, 1972, and was replaced by the new WCVB-TV early the next morning. The Herald-Traveler refused to hand over its facilities to the new channel 5, forcing the station to rent tower space for its transmitter from WBZ-TV (channel 4); during the final months of its operation, WHDH-TV was court-ordered to sign off daily at 1 a.m. so that WCVB-TV could test its equipment. WCVB purchased a former International Harvester sales and service facility in Needham to serve as its studio facility along Route 128, which the station continues to operate from to this day. Although WCVB operates under a different license and celebrates station anniversaries using its 1972 sign-on date, it inherited all of WHDH-TV's personnel, including anchorman Jack Hynes and sportscaster Don Gillis, all transferred to WCVB-TV with the termination of the WHDH-TV license.

However, WCVB did not inherit its predecessor's CBS affiliation. Boston Broadcasters' plans for a large amount of local programming would have resulted in heavy preemptions of network programming. CBS was not pleased with the prospect of being subjected to numerous preemptions of its programs in one of the nation's largest markets. It refused to have anything to do with WCVB, and moved its programming back to WNAC-TV, which had been Boston's original CBS affiliate from 1948 to 1960. NBC was entrenched with WBZ-TV, and in any event was even less tolerant of preemptions than CBS. More or less by default, WCVB affiliated with ABC.

==== Local programming ====
Making good on its promise, WCVB aired more local programming than any other television station in the nation throughout the 1970s and 1980s. One of its local programs, Good Day!, which first premiered in 1973 as Good Morning!, broke ground by taking its entire production on the road and broadcasting from locations outside of the Boston area and around the world. Good Day!, along with The Morning Exchange on Cleveland's WEWS-TV, served as a prototype for the format of ABC's Good Morning America. Good Day! lasted until 1991.

During the 1970s, WCVB-TV was the first television station in southern New England to run a 24-hour program schedule. The station ran a programming block from 1 to 5 a.m., branded as 5 All Night, which featured a library of older black-and-white movies and a few recent syndicated programs. During station breaks, announcer George Fennel (who never made an on-camera appearance during the block) would make live announcements and read fan mail from the viewing audience, as various 5 All Night logo backdrops were displayed on-screen. His actual first on-air portrait was displayed as part of a donation pledge drive for the Jerry Lewis MDA Labor Day Telethon. The portrait had been covered from view and as the tally had reached a certain amount, a piece of the portrait would be revealed to the viewers until it was completely uncovered, revealing what Fennel looked like.

Another staple of 5 All Night was Simon's Sanctorum, a program similar to Elvira's Movie Macabre that showcased old black-and-white horror movies; it was hosted by a character named Simon (portrayed by Gary Newton), who often referred to his viewing audience as to being "moths lured to a flame" and "Dearly Devoted". Simon's costume consisted of an old top hat, and fluorescent green facial makeup with black circles painted around each eye and gloves that had the fingers cut out of them. To add to an extra eerie effect, a fluorescent black light was used to enhance the makeup effect on Simon's face and eyes. His eyes actually glowed by the use of fluorescent paint on a pair of special contact lenses.

==== Ownership changes ====
Boston Broadcasters sold WCVB to Metromedia in 1982 for $220 million, the costliest sale ever made for a local station at the time. In 1986, Metromedia sold its television stations to the News Corporation (then-owners of the 20th Century Fox film studio), which later used Metromedia's group of independent stations to launch the Fox network on October 9. Channel 5 was included in the original deal, but was concurrently spun off to the Hearst Corporation, which had purchased fellow ABC affiliate KMBC-TV in Kansas City, Missouri, from Metromedia in 1982. That station was sold to allow Metromedia to acquire WCVB (to comply with FCC rules in effect at the time that limited the number of VHF stations owned by a single company to only five), and it is believed that Metromedia gave Hearst a right of first refusal offer if WCVB ever went up for sale again. Fox would get its own station in Boston in 1987, when it bought WXNE-TV (channel 25) from the Christian Broadcasting Network and renamed it WFXT (Fox subsequently sold WFXT to the Boston Celtics in 1990, repurchased the station in 1995, and then traded WFXT to Cox Media Group in 2014).

== Logo ==
In 1971, graphic design firm Wyman & Canaan (now Bill Canaan & Company) developed a new stylized "5" logo (which features an arrow curving upward, rendered in negative space, within the "5"). Having debuted when WCVB first began operations in 1972, this logo surpassed WBZ's Group W font logo (which that station used from 1963 to 1996), as the longest-used numeric logo in New England television history in 2005.

== Programming ==
=== Local shows ===
WCVB currently produces the following programs:

- Chronicle is a nightly local newsmagazine series that started in 1982—as of 2019 it is aired daily on the main channel with additional showings via the 5.2 subchannel on weekdays only. It focuses on topics of special interest throughout New England, though at times the program focuses on subjects outside the region such as Ireland. The Main Streets and Back Roads, one of the program's longest-running series, looks at life in New England, primarily in the rural areas. A New Hampshire version of the program is produced by WCVB's sister station WMUR-TV; two other sister stations, WYFF in Greenville, South Carolina, and WTAE-TV in Pittsburgh, produce news specials based on the flagship program's format. The WCVB edition became the first local television program in New England to broadcast in high definition on March 3, 1999 (though only select editions were produced and broadcast in HD until October 25, 2006).
- CityLine (no relation to the Canadian talk show), which airs Sundays at noon, looks at urban issues and interests within the Boston area. Its longtime host is Karen Holmes Ward.
- On the Record (also referred to as OTR), which airs Sundays at 11 am, focuses on local political issues and is hosted by Ed Harding and Janet Wu.

While the station is no longer as involved in locally produced programming as it once was, it has had some influential programs:

- Candlepin Bowling, which ran Saturdays at noon for nearly four decades, and was hosted for nearly all of that time by legendary WCVB sports anchor Don Gillis.
- Good Day!, mid-morning talk show, an inspiration for Good Morning America.
- Miller's Court, a dramatized mock-trial program with a live audience. Hosted by Harvard Law Professor Arthur R. Miller.
- Park Street Under, a sitcom set in a fictional Boston bar, regarded as an influence for Cheers.
- The Baxters, a sitcom featuring an American family, with a discussion component. The WCVB-produced series, which ran from 1977 to 1979, employed local actors; Norman Lear became involved in 1979, following which the program aired nationally in first-run syndication for an additional two seasons. Lear departed before the program's second season in syndication, with WCVB resuming production responsibilities for the show; all of the characters were recast with Canadian actors.
- The Great Entertainment, an anthology series presenting classic movies with commentary by host Frank Avruch.
- Night Shift, a series that aired after midnight on Fridays in the late 1980s, and featured college student films from around New England. Christine Caswell co-hosted two seasons of Night Shift and would later anchor and report at WHDH, WFXT, NECN and Catholic TV. Future executive producer of A&E's Beyond Scared Straight, Paul Coyne, appeared three times showcasing his student works from Fitchburg State College.
- NightTalk with Jane Whitney, a late-night talk show using an issues-based daytime talk show format (a la Donahue and Oprah) hosted by Jane Whitney. After airing locally in Boston and in 11 other select markets from spring 1992 through summer 1993, it ran in national syndication as The Jane Whitney Show during the 1993–94 season, mainly in daytime slots (WCVB, which continued to produce the show, kept it in its 12:35 a.m. time slot).

From 1990 through 2002, WCVB-TV produced coverage of the Boston Pops Orchestra's annual Fourth of July concert at the Hatch Memorial Shell; beginning in 1991, the program was simulcast nationally on cable channel A&E (which is partly owned by Hearst), and also aired on WMUR-TV following Hearst's acquisition of that station in 2001. The concert's producer, David Mugar, moved the program to WBZ-TV and CBS in 2003.

=== Talk show time slots ===
On September 8, 1987, WCVB became the Boston home of The Oprah Winfrey Show, having outbid WBZ-TV (which aired the show at 9 a.m. during its first season) for the long-term local syndication rights. For 24 years, Oprah served as the lead-in to WCVB's evening newscasts, first for the 6 p.m. edition of NewsCenter 5 from 1987 to 1994, then moving to 4 p.m. on September 5, 1994, upon the debut of the station's hour-long 5 p.m. newscast. In both time periods, Oprah always held first place among the program's competitors, and consistently kept WCVB's neighboring newscasts at number one. Winfrey's decision to end her daytime talk show in May 2011 resulted in many stations scrambling to replace it with equally strong programming. The Ellen DeGeneres Show—which WCVB had aired at 9 a.m. since 2005—was chosen to replace Oprah in the 4 p.m. slot, moving there on August 22, 2011; it was replaced in the 9 a.m. timeslot by Live! with Regis and Kelly, which moved to the station after a 23-year run on WHDH. Oprah, meanwhile, moved to weekday mornings at 1:05 a.m. for the remaining weeks of its run.

On January 11, 2016, WCVB moved The Meredith Vieira Show from 3 p.m. to 1:07 am, where it remained until it concluded its run in September. On the same day, Ellen moved to 3 pm, and Inside Edition was moved to the 4 p.m. slot, from the 7 p.m. slot it had held since September 1994. This then freed up 4:30 p.m. and 7 p.m. for two new newscasts. The 4:30 newscast was stated to be a fast-paced rundown of the day's news, while the 7 p.m. newscast covers longer-length stories of special interest. With the scheduling of the 4 p.m. hour resulting in low ratings, changes were made in November 2016; at this time, the half-hour NewsCenter 5 at 4:00 premiered, and Inside Edition moved to 4:30 pm. As of 2019, Inside Edition has been dropped from the schedule and has moved to WHDH. WCVB now airs 2 1/2 hours of local news from 4 to 6:30 pm, with a break from 6:30 to 7 p.m. for ABC World News Tonight (coincidentally, anchored by WCVB alum David Muir since September 2, 2014), then picking up again from 7 to 7:30 p.m.

=== Past programming preemptions and deferrals ===
Due to its commitment to local programming, the station was quick to preempt programs, including underperforming ABC prime time shows. Most of the time, these programs were picked up by independent stations such as WQTV (channel 68, now WBPX-TV) or Worcester-based WHLL (channel 27, now WUTF-TV). Since the mid-1990s, WCVB has carried ABC's entire programming schedule, although it occasionally preempts network programming in favor of locally produced specials and movies. Notable examples are the annual MDA Labor Day Telethon (before the program's 2013 move to ABC as a short-form broadcast, although it did stay on WCVB; the program would be discontinued after the 2014 edition) and the 2004 preemption of Saving Private Ryan (one of several ABC stations that preempted the film out of concern over the graphic war battle scenes and profanity that were left intact in the uncut ABC telecast and fear of resulting FCC fines) for another movie, Far and Away.

Until the late 1990s, WCVB broadcast the 1954 film White Christmas annually during the holiday season, preempting ABC network programming.

=== Lottery ===
WCVB was originally in the running to become the Massachusetts State Lottery's host station in late 1986, when WBZ-TV relinquished the rights. In the months leading up to the winning bid, WCVB management had asked Janet Langhart to host the nightly lottery drawings if the station won the contract. Langhart was reportedly angered by the proposition, accusing WCVB of trying to minimize her from the role of respected journalist and talk show host, and also inferring a racial motivation behind the offer (Langhart is African American). Ultimately, WCVB lost its bid for the lottery rights to WNEV-TV (channel 7), which began broadcasting the drawings and all other related broadcast property in August 1987.

In 1993, when WHDH-TV (the former WNEV-TV) was purchased by Sunbeam Television, the lottery did not renew the station's contract for another cycle. It was announced soon after that WCVB would acquire the rights. From March 7, 1994, to May 19, 1998, WCVB was the official station for Lottery Live, the weeknight broadcasts of the Massachusetts State Lottery drawings. Unlike predecessor host station WHDH, where both Lottery Live weeknight drawings aired between 7:50 and 8 pm, WCVB chose to air the daily Numbers Game at 7:53 (during Chronicle) while the featured game (e.g., Mass Millions) aired earlier at 6:50 (during NewsCenter 5 at 6:00 during the spring and summer of 1994, and during ABC's World News Tonight in the months thereafter). In early 1995, the specialty games moved to 11:10 p.m. (later 11:20) during NewsCenter 5 Tonight. Dawn Hayes, who emceed the drawings on WHDH, was retained as host. Frequent substitute hosts for Hayes on WCVB were Kristen Daly (later a news reporter/anchor for WABU and WLVI) and Nancy O'Neil, wife of former Red Sox pitcher Dennis Eckersley.

The Massachusetts Lottery (in association with Jonathan Goodson) also backed an hour-long Saturday night game show, Bonus Bonanza, which debuted on February 4, 1995. Hayes served as co-host with Brian Tracey. Bonus Bonanza had randomly drawn contestants play elimination games (similar to The Price Is Right) to win big cash prizes. At the end of each show, that night's three players would return to play a bonus round. Each would place a cylinder on a numbered space from 1 to 12. A motorized cube would then be let go, to knock the cylinders down. After 30 seconds, any player that had a cylinder still standing won the cash amount (ranging from $7,500 to $200,000) associated with their number choice. The $200,000 prize was won several times during the program's three-year run on WCVB. It also served as the runoff program for the various contests associated with the Massachusetts Lottery. One such contest featured contestants playing for a cruise for 20, a Chevrolet Blazer SUV, and $25,000 a year for life. Bonus Bonanza was canceled shortly before WCVB's lottery contract ended, airing its final episode in March 1998. The nightly lottery drawings moved back to WBZ-TV two months later on May 20, 1998.

The drawings returned to WCVB in August 2004 in a revamped format, with only on-screen graphics displaying the already-drawn winning numbers for a minute or so. A rotating group of off-screen voiceovers announced the drawings. In the case of the daily Numbers Game, however, a mid-screen shot of the traditional "number wheels" were featured, with the balls resting on the chosen digits. The Numbers Game drawings continued to air at approximately 7:53, while the specialty games ran at 11:10 on weeknights. In 2008, for the first time in the Lottery's broadcast history, midday Numbers Game drawings were introduced, with the results running at the bottom of the screen, at 12:50 p.m. weekdays, during Who Wants to Be a Millionaire. The weeknight Numbers Game drawings became part of NewsCenter 5 Prime Time Update, a five-minute news and weather segment that began airing within the last ten minutes of Chronicle in 2009. On August 15, 2011, daily drawings ended their second stint on WCVB, and moved exclusively to the Massachusetts Lottery website; the station continues to air Mega Millions or Powerball featuring larger jackpots, at the discretion of the station.

=== Sports ===
In 1987, United Press International awarded WCVB "Best Sports Reporting" in the nation. For fourteen years, WCVB's Mike Lynch hosted the weekly New England Patriots show Patriots Preview and Patriots All Access with exclusive one on one sit down interviews with Bill Parcells, Pete Carroll and Bill Belichick. Until 2009, WCVB's sports department produced Patriots preseason games. These telecasts were also seen on sister station WMTW in Portland, Maine, and WNAC-TV in Providence, Rhode Island. In addition, WCVB formerly preempted ABC programming to air all Patriots games that aired as part of ESPN Sunday Night Football. Presently, this occurs during ESPN Monday Night Football Patriots game telecasts (ESPN is 20% owned by WCVB's corporate parent Hearst Communications; the station also carried any Patriots appearances on Monday Night Football when ABC held the rights to that package). WCVB was also the official station of Boston College Eagles football during Doug Flutie's historic 1984 season, that of which culminated with Flutie winning the Heisman Trophy.

Until 2005, when the Boston Red Sox were involved in post-season action, WCVB simulcast those games from ESPN (MLB divisional playoff games have since moved to TBS); WCVB also aired select Red Sox games through ABC's MLB broadcast contract from 1976 to 1989.

From 1982 through 2006, WCVB telecast live wire-to-wire coverage of the Boston Marathon. Though the broadcasts generally rated higher than the competing wire-to-wire coverage on WBZ-TV, the station announced in November 2006 that it would stop carrying the race, as declining viewership and advertising revenue made it difficult for the station to justify providing all-day coverage, despite production costs being shared with WBZ-TV and the Boston Athletic Association (BAA). The BAA then signed a new deal with WBZ. On June 22, 2022, the BAA announced that the marathon would return to WCVB beginning with the 2023 race, in a partnership with ESPN, which carries the event nationally. In addition to the ESPN simulcast, Hearst's other New England stations—WMUR-TV in Manchester; WMTW in Portland; and WPTZ in Plattsburgh, New York–Burlington, Vermont—also air WCVB's coverage of the race.

WCVB also airs NBA games involving the Boston Celtics via the league's contract with ABC. The station has aired the Celtics' victories in the 2008 and 2024 NBA Finals and their 2010 and 2022 NBA Finals appearances.

=== News operation ===
WCVB presently broadcasts 43 hours, 55 minutes of locally produced newscasts each week (with 6 hours, 35 minutes each weekday, five hours on Saturdays and six hours on Sundays). The station operates an Aérospatiale AS350B helicopter entitled "Sky 5" that is live broadcast capable. For statewide news coverage throughout Massachusetts, WCVB shares resources with the other ABC affiliate in the state: WGGB-TV in Springfield. WCAP (980) in Lowell runs audio simulcasts of portions of WCVB's morning and evening newscasts on weekdays.

As WCVB's newscasts are titled NewsCenter 5, the station's sports segments are likewise branded as SportsCenter 5; weather segments were similarly branded as WeatherCenter 5 prior to 2001. WCVB is believed to be the only local station permitted to use the SportsCenter name, owned by ESPN, for its sportscasts, owing to its ownership by Hearst (which owns 20% of ESPN) and affiliation with ABC (whose parent, The Walt Disney Company, owns the other 80%), along with its use predating ESPN's 1979 existence. However, there is no overlap in content or appearance between WCVB's sportscasts and the ESPN program beyond the latter's occasional use of WCVB video with credit for press conference and interview segments.

Concurrent with WCVB's sign-on on March 19, 1972, the station began its news operations as News 5. This branding was used until 1973 when its newscasts were retitled under the current NewsCenter 5 brand. Since then, WCVB has been known for exceptional news coverage and has consistently been at the top of the news ratings since the early 1980s. Through the next couple decades, the station boasted the most-watched news team of Chet Curtis and Natalie Jacobson who married each other while serving as co-anchors. However, by the late 1990s and early 2000s, the station was in a period of transition as it saw major competition from a resurgent WHDH-TV. At the same time, the station, known for the longevity and stability of its on-air staff, saw the end of its longtime anchor team of Curtis and Jacobson (as well as their marriage, which ended in divorce at the same time). Jacobson continued to anchor at channel 5, while Curtis left for regional cable news channel New England Cable News, which was jointly owned by Hearst until Comcast bought out its stake in the channel in 2009. Jacobson retired from WCVB on July 18, 2007.

In mid-October 2001, WCVB launched its weather radar, "StormTrak 5 Live Doppler", currently known as "Storm Team 5 HD Doppler", becoming the first station in the market to operate its own radar. It is located west of Boston in Hopkinton. In 2002, chief meteorologist Dick Albert was joined by former rival Harvey Leonard who left WHDH to become co-chief meteorologist with Albert. Widely regarded as two of Boston's top meteorologists, Leonard and Albert were honored by the Associated Press in 2005 for "Best Weathercast in New England". Leonard became the sole chief meteorologist following Albert's retirement in February 2009. In February 2007, meteorologist Mike Wankum, who was chief meteorologist at WLVI until that station's news department shut down two months prior as a result of its purchase by WHDH parent Sunbeam Television, was hired by WCVB as the weekend evening meteorologist.

For the February 2007 sweeps ratings period, WCVB placed first in every local news timeslot it competed in. Channel 5 even displaced WHDH in total viewers and the 25–54 demographic at 11 pm, marking the first time since 1998 that WCVB swept all of its newscast timeslots. Only WFXT's 10 p.m. news drew more viewers than any of the "big three" affiliates' late evening newscasts. That victory was short-lived, however, as WHDH regained the lead at 11 p.m. during the May 2007 sweeps, after another close battle. WBZ-TV led in the 11 p.m. timeslot from late 2007 to early 2010 with WCVB maintaining second place in that timeslot during that period. WCVB has since regained the lead at 11 p.m.

On May 14, 2007, starting with the 5 p.m. newscast, WCVB began broadcasting its local newscasts in high definition, although the majority of the field reports remained in 4:3 standard definition for a few months. The station was the first in the Boston market, as well as New England, to make the transition (the duopoly of KCRA-TV and KQCA in Sacramento, California, were the first stations owned by Hearst to make the upgrade). On September 7, 2010, WCVB expanded its weekday morning newscast to 2 1/2 hours, with its start time moved to 4:30 am. Four days later on September 11, 2010, the weekend morning newscast was expanded to three hours, running from 5 a.m. to 8 am.

In spring 2013, well-known and popular meteorologist Cindy Fitzgibbon joined WCVB as a weatherperson. Anchor JC Monahan moved to Chronicle and anchor of the 5 p.m. news. Fitzgibbon was on WFXT's morning newscast for nearly a decade, and now appears on the NewsCenter 5 EyeOpener and noon newscasts. In recent years, the Eyeopener has consistently been the market's most-watched morning newscast, and the 6 a.m. hour often ranks as the most-watched newscast by viewers in the 25–54 demographic.

In September 2015, WCVB announced that they would launch a weekend 5 p.m. newscast starting November 8, 2015. On January 11, 2016, WCVB added two additional weekday newscasts, one at 4 p.m. and a second at 7 pm. WCVB president and general manager Bill Fine stated that the newscast expansion "...addresses an expressed need of Boston's viewers by providing additional options to receive NewsCenter 5 at new times". In February 2016, WCVB announced that it would also add a nightly prime time newscast at 10 p.m. on its MeTV subchannel, The 10 O'Clock News on MeTV Boston, beginning February 29, 2016. The 10 p.m. newscast was cut to a half-hour on March 26, 2016; at the time, all four of Boston's local news operations, along with New Hampshire's WBIN-TV, had 10 p.m. newscasts in some form, and ratings issues played into the reduction.

==== Notable current on-air staff ====
- Duke Castiglione – weekend anchor

==== Notable former on-air staff ====
- Frank Avruch – booth announcer
- Jim Boyd – anchor/reporter
- Chet Curtis – main anchor (1972–2000)
- Tom Ellis – news anchor (1978–1982)
- Don Gillis – sports anchor/host (1972–1996)
- Bill Harrington – news reporter and State House correspondent
- John Henning – reporter
- Bob Halloran – sports anchor/reporter
- Natalie Jacobson – main anchor (1972–2007)
- Dr. Tim Johnson – medical correspondent
- Harvey Leonard – chief meteorologist (2002–2022)
- J. C. Monahan – meteorologist, news, and Chronicle anchor (now at WBTS-CD)
- Martha Raddatz – reporter (1993–1998)
- David Muir – anchor and reporter (2000–2003)
- Bill O'Reilly – commentator (1985–1987)
- Keith Olbermann – sportscaster (1984–1985)
- Susan Wornick – news anchor and reporter (1981–2014)

== Community outreach ==
Since 1972, WCVB-TV, as a part of its commitment to serving the community through extensive local programming, has run a series of different public service campaigns to help educate people on relevant issues and values of the day. Each campaign has had a different theme, ranging from racial unity to family values and achieving success through continued education. Over the last few decades, these campaigns have consisted of the following:

- The New England Network (1970s)
- A World of Difference (1985–1988)
- Great Expectations (1988–1990)
- Family Works! (1991–1993)
- Success By 6 (1993–1996) – early childhood education.
- The HealthBeat Project (1996–2001)
- Keeping Kids On Track (2001–2003)
- CommonWealth 5 (2001–2015) – highlights non-profits to recruit volunteers and donors.
- High 5! (1984–present) – showcases athletic teams across Massachusetts hosted by Mike Lynch.
- A+ (1997–present) – showcases students across Massachusetts
- 5 On (2014–present) – highlights a different community in Massachusetts each week
- Made in Mass (2016–present) – Highlights items and goods made in the state.
- 5 for Good (2015–present) – Highlights local charities and community good will efforts.

== Technical information ==
=== Subchannels ===
The station's signal is multiplexed:

Subchannels of WCVB-TV
Subchannel	Res.	Short name	Programming
5.1	1080i	WCVB-TV	ABC
5.2	480i	MeTV	MeTV
5.3	480i	Story	Story Television
5.4	480i	365BLK	365BLK
50.1	480i	WWJE-DT	True Crime Network (WWJE-DT)

Broadcast on behalf of another station

The ABC subchannel is offered in ATSC 3.0 (NextGen TV) format from the transmitter of WUNI.

WCVB is one of a handful of ABC-affiliated stations and one of several Hearst-owned ABC affiliates that broadcast their high-definition signals in 1080i rather than the 720p format of most other ABC stations. This includes WCVB's ABC-affiliated sister stations WMUR-TV in nearby Manchester, New Hampshire, WTAE-TV in Pittsburgh, KMBC-TV in Kansas City, and KETV in Omaha, as well as stations not owned by Hearst in eight other markets.

On July 24, 2012, Hearst Television renewed its affiliation agreement with MeTV to maintain existing affiliations with eight Hearst-owned stations currently carrying the digital multicast network through 2015. As part of the renewal, Hearst also signed agreements to add the network as digital subchannels of WCVB-TV and sister stations KCRA-TV in Sacramento, WBAL-TV in Baltimore, KOCO-TV in Oklahoma City and WXII-TV in Winston-Salem, North Carolina. As WCVB did not operate any additional digital multicast feeds outside of main channel 5.1, MeTV was added on a newly created second digital subchannel of the station on October 1, 2012. This also provides WCVB a backup channel to air ABC programming during breaking or pre-planned local news coverage.

=== Analog-to-digital conversion ===
WCVB-TV ended regular programming on its analog signal, over VHF channel 5, on June 12, 2009, the official date on which full-power television stations in the United States transitioned from analog to digital broadcasts under federal mandate. The station's digital signal continued to broadcast on its pre-transition UHF channel 20, using virtual channel 5.

As part of the SAFER Act, WCVB temporarily kept its analog channel as one of three nightlight stations in the Boston area (alongside WBZ-TV and WGBH-TV). The station's nightlight service loop consisted of the official public service program from the National Association of Broadcasters, an episode of This Old House (a nationally distributed show on PBS presented by Boston's WGBH-TV), and reruns of segments from WCVB's newscasts; all were dedicated to instructions and questions about switching to digital television for viewers who have not yet upgraded their old analog sets. The station's analog signal then switched off permanently at the completion of the nightlight service on July 13, around midnight.

In 2019, WCVB shifted from physical channel 20 to 33 because of the spectrum incentive auction, though it does not broadcast (before and after the repack) between channels 38 to 51 which were removed from the television bandplan, repacking stations into channels 2 to 36.

== See also ==
- Channel 5 virtual TV stations in the United States
- Channel 33 digital TV stations in the United States
- List of television stations in Massachusetts
- List of United States stations available in Canada
