= Dennis and Callahan =

American morning radio show

Dennis and Callahan Show
- Genre: Sports, current events, politics, talk
- Running time: 4 hours (previously 3-hour simulcast on television)
- Country of origin: United States
- Home station: WEEI-FM
- Starring: John Dennis; Gerry Callahan; Kirk Minihane; John Meterparel
- Executive producers: Ken Laird; Chris Curtis; Sausage; Iggy
- Original release: 1997 – 2016

Dennis and Callahan was an American morning radio show on WEEI-FM, a sports radio station in Boston, Massachusetts. On November 16, 2010, a live three-hour simulcast began airing on NESN at 6–10 AM Eastern time each weekday. The show combines talk of sports and politics, along with current or "water cooler" issues. The show premiered in 1997 with sportswriter Gerry Callahan and former WHDH Sports Director John Dennis, and it received strong ratings until WEEI received ratings competition in 2009 with the launch of CBS Radio's sports station, WBZ-FM (98.5); the ratings began to fall from the peak.

On February 21, 2013, it was reported WEEI.com columnist Kirk Minihane would be joining the show as a third co-host. His addition proved to be controversial when he made comments in July 2014 deemed as sexist against Fox Sports reporter Erin Andrews, and a later apology which ended with further disparaging comments against her. This caused Minihane to be handed down a one-week suspension from WEEI, with the show ending up having an "unrelated" (fairly related) discontinuation of the NESN simulcast in September, and 21st Century Fox pulling all advertising for their film and television properties from the radio stations of WEEI parent Entercom Communications throughout the United States and a blanket refusal by Fox Sports to allow their personalities on WEEI.

== Program suspension ==
On August 13, 2007, Entercom announced that the program would be suspended indefinitely until contract disputes involving both Dennis and Callahan were settled. The duo were scheduled to return to the air together that day for the first time in over three months after Callahan's long medical absence, and after a one-week vacation by Dennis. The contract dispute was believed to center around the hosts' desire to obtain a pay increase greater than what was being offered by the station, to an amount they believe better reflects the revenue the show generates. Their ratings consistently ranked No. 1 among male listeners in the 25- to 54-year-old demographic.

On August 16, 2007, the Boston Globe reported that Dennis and Callahan were in negotiations to move their show to WCRB-FM, a Boston-based radio station that was considering changing its format from classical music to all sports. Just one day later, however, the Boston Globe reported that Entercom had entered into a syndication deal with Nassau Broadcasting putting WEEI programs on 11 of Nassau's New England stations. Part of the deal includes Entercom obtaining a 50 percent stake in WCRB-FM with the intent to keep the station on a classical format, thus preventing a move there by Dennis and Callahan.

The show continued to air daily as the Dennis and Callahan Show with rotating guest hosts including Steve DeOssie, Dan Patrick, Bob Lobel, Jon Meterparel, Bob Halloran, Ron Borges, Greg Dickerson, John Rooke, Steve Burton, Butch Stearns, Craig Mustard, Ted Johnson and Larry Johnson.

On September 10, 2007, the two returned to the air full-time informing their listeners that they had agreed to 5-year deals. According to local news reports, the contract impasse was resolved after the direct intervention of Entercom President and CEO David Field who reportedly offered the two a substantial increase, reportly in the eight-figure range.

== Regular guests ==
=== Most recent ===
- Patriots quarterback Tom Brady every Monday during football season.
- ESPN's Tim Hasselbeck appears every Monday during football season.

=== Past ===
- Red Sox pitcher Curt Schilling appeared every Tuesday during baseball season. Schilling donated his appearance fee to the ALS Association. He currently is a regular guest on The Big Show.
- an Ex-Con named Rabbit often calls about Aaron Hernandez and other criminals
- Former Boston College Eagles football coach Jeff Jagodzinski appeared frequently during the college football season on a segment they called the Coach Jags Show.
- Patriots quarterback Matt Cassel appeared every Monday during the 2008 football season.
- Dave Portnoy, publisher of Barstool Sports, appeared on the show each Friday during the summer of 2011. The station dropped his appearances on August 12 after Barstool published a nude photograph of Patriot quarterback Tom Brady's two-year-old son with accompanying commentary on the size of the child's genitalia. However, he was welcomed back to the show as a guest in May 2015 to discuss Brady in the wake of his Deflategate suspension and the "Free Brady" rally at Gilette Stadium (though there is no word on whether he will return as a regular guest.)
- Celtics head coach Doc Rivers every Thursday during basketball season.

== Controversies and issues ==
=== Boston Globe Ban ===
In 1999, the Boston Globe's executive sports editor, Don Skwar banned its sportswriters from the Globe from appearing on the Dennis & Callahan morning show because of its perceived lowbrow humor. This came two weeks after he banned Globe sportswriters from appearing on WEEI's afternoon The Big Show after columnist Ron Borges appeared on the show and used a racial slur to describe New York Yankees pitcher Hideki Irabu. After the ban, WEEI retaliated by banning Globe sportswriters from all WEEI programs. It was also about this time that Michael Holley, who was involved with both, chose his side and departed from the Globe to join WEEI full time. However, the show has welcomed Globe stalwart Bob Ryan as a guest host and did welcome former Globe columnist Jackie MacMullan while Ryan and Kathryn Tappen were guest hosting in order to share a story about Whitey Bulger soon after he was caught in the summer of 2011.

=== METCO controversy ===
On September 29, 2003, during a segment called 'headlines', where they read and comment about current news stories, Callahan and his morning co-host John Dennis made racist comments while discussing a story about an escaped gorilla. The gorilla had escaped from the Franklin Park Zoo and had been recaptured at a bus stop. According to newspaper articles, the exchange allegedly was:

Callahan: "They caught him at a bus stop, right -- he was like waiting to catch a bus out of town."

Dennis: "Yeah, yeah -- he's a METCO gorilla."

Callahan: "Heading out to Lexington."

Dennis: "Exactly."

METCO is a state program that buses inner-city Boston students to nearby suburban schools. The racist comments compared poor, mostly African-American children to gorillas. WEEI general manager Tom Baker suspended both hosts for two days, then extended the suspension to two weeks after the Blue Cross-Blue Shield (Blue Cross Blue Shield of Massachusetts) pulled $27,000 in ads and in turn donated that money to METCO. Dunkin' Donuts responded by ceasing all advertising that involved the voices of John Dennis or Gerry Callahan. Both hosts apologized and were sent to sensitivity training. WEEI also agreed to provide free advertising for the METCO program on the radio station. In November 2003, WEEI General Manager Tom Baker was replaced by Julie Kahn. Station executives denied there was a connection between the METCO incident and Baker's replacement.

=== Queer Eye ===
On June 2, 2005 Callahan, who has been accused of making homophobic comments on the air, upset some listeners during interviews with Red Sox CEO Larry Lucchino and relief pitcher Mike Timlin discussing the upcoming visit of Carson Kressley and the cast from Queer Eye at Fenway Park. Kressley and his co-hosts were scheduled to throw out the first pitch at Fenway Park on Sunday, June 5, 2005 before the Red Sox faced the Los Angeles Angels. In questioning Lucchino, Callahan asked if the team had received any complaints about "'fruitcakes sashaying' in front of children and families, and on a Sunday, of all days". In a later interview, Mike Timlin voiced his opinion that "homosexuals are not living correctly". Approached later by reporters from the Boston Globe, station manager Jason Wolfe claimed that Callahan did not object to Kressley being gay, but rather that "it's the openness and the flaunting of it".

=== Dennis' irate voicemail to Ryen Russillo ===
In September 2005, a profanity-laced audio file was posted on Barstool Sports, containing a voice mail message from John Dennis threatening rival sports radio personality Ryen Russillo (then of 1510 The Zone, later the co-host of SVP & Russillo on ESPN Radio with Scott Van Pelt and then of Russillo and Kanell on ESPN Radio with Danny Kanell) In the audio tape, Dennis accuses Russillo of being a drunk and hitting on his daughter. After the incident, the New England Patriots had Russillo removed from WBCN's post-game show with Gary Tanguay & Company. At the time WBCN, which was owned by CBS, held broadcast rights to Patriot games. Dennis denied any responsibility for the Patriots' decision.

=== Kevin Weeks interview ===
In March 2006, some listeners of the Dennis and Callahan Show were upset when they conducted an in studio interview with Kevin Weeks, a former member of Whitey Bulger's South Boston based criminal organization. Weeks had admitted to committing armed and unarmed assaults, kidnappings and being an accessory to several murders on behalf of Whitey Bulger and had played a role helping Bulger escape arrest. His appearance on the show was to promote his book, Brutal : The Untold Story of My Life Inside Whitey Bulger's Irish Mob (ISBN 0-06-112269-6). Some listeners felt that it was wrong for the show to help Weeks promote his book. Callahan told the Boston Herald that they wrestled with whether to "put this thug on air." but the bottom line, he said, "It's good radio."

=== Doyle family apology ===
In June 2007, Dennis apologized on-air to the Doyle family of Massachusetts to avert a potential lawsuit for defaming the family on the radio. The controversy began in February 2007, when Doyle family member Patrick Doyle was sentenced to five years probation after pleading guilty to child endangerment. Doyle was present when a 9-year-old girl was repeatedly raped by two other men in the bed next to him while he had sex with two women, one of whom is the girl's mother. Doyle comes from a family that includes a serving District Court Judge, a retired District Court Judge and an Essex County Assistant District Attorney. While discussing the sentence which they believed was far too lenient, Dennis and Callahan accused members of the Doyle family of interceding on behalf of Doyle and suggested that "the fix was in".

=== Comments on Opie & Anthony April fools prank ===
On an April 1 show in 2008, both Dennis and Callahan during a top ten April fools prank list made mention to a prank done by the radio show duo Opie and Anthony in 1998. At the time, the duo was hosting the afternoon drive show on WAAF-FM and had the highest ratings in the market. Said prank involved hosts Gregg “Opie” Hughes and Anthony Cumia insinuating that then-Boston mayor Thomas Menino had been killed, but eventually got so far out of hand that it led to their firing a week later after Menino filed a complaint with the Federal Communications Commission.

During the segment where they revisited the incident, Dennis openly wondered what had happened to “those guys”, to which Callahan responded by saying that they were “working at McDonald’s with a pedophile.” The comment did not sit well with Hughes and Cumia, who were airing at the time on WBCN-FM in the same time slot that Dennis and Callahan were, and they played the clip on air. This led to various Opie and Anthony fans bombarding WEEI with calls regarding where Opie and Anthony were working (among other prank calls) and forced the station to temporarily reduce the amount of calls being taken from listeners. (Opie and Anthony was eventually dropped by WBCN by the end of the year due to a continued decline in ratings, which led to the cancellation of the program by CBS Radio shortly thereafter.)

=== Election joke ===
In November 2008, the duo drew criticism from the office of Massachusetts Secretary of State William Galvin after they told listeners that the election had been postponed and that Democrats should cast their votes on November 5 (the day after Election Day). Galvin's spokesperson said the show was doing a disservice to voters and warned them that they could be violating a state law against interfering with elections. In response, Gerry Callahan stated "Obviously it was a joke and I think most listeners understood it was a joke".

=== Receiving threatening phone calls ===
In January 2009, a man from Cambridge, Massachusetts, was charged in relation to a series of obscene and threatening phone calls made to the station over a period of two months. The man, who was apparently upset with the on-air duo's support of Senator John McCain's presidential candidacy, allegedly called the station starting in October 2008 threatening the show's hosts as well as WEEI program director Jason Wolfe and vice president of Entercom New England Julie Kahn. The man who was charged with two counts of criminal harassment, two counts of threats to commit a crime and a single count of making annoying phone calls. In a plea bargain in February 2009, the man pleaded guilty to one of the charges against him and was sentenced to probation for a year. He must also undergo anger management counseling, perform 20 hours of community service and stay away from the victims and never call the station again.

=== Dennis' alcohol rehab ===
In April 2015, Dennis wrote in the Boston Herald that he was taking an indefinite leave of absence from WEEI in order to enter rehab and address his alcoholism. Callahan and Minihane stated their support on the air, and after a successful stay of roughly a month, Dennis returned to the show sober.

== Other topics ==
- The show also enjoys talking about the world of entertainment and are fans of the Farrelly Brothers. Not only did they interview them ahead of the releases of Dumb and Dumber To and the Three Stooges 2012 film, but they joined them on the Three Stooges set and Dennis even had a part as an ESPN broadcaster in Kingpin.
  - Other frequent entertainers who join the show include Boston-area natives Mike O'Malley and Lenny Clarke. Dennis and Callahan also appeared in the episode of O'Malley's show Survivor's Remorse entitled "Homebound" as themselves as Cam Calloway (Jessie T. Usher) joins them on air at the start of the episode.
- The hosts also allow themselves to comment on the attractiveness of women they have seen or know, including Kathryn Tappen, Heidi Watney and Debbie DiMasi.
- Since Minihane's arrival, the show has revived one of their old segments, "Headlines, Headlines, Headlines", led by Minihane, in which the hosts talk about news topics that are not necessarily sports-related and can be either serious or trivial.
  - The show now also hosts a weekly uncensored podcast called Breaking Balls after Breaking Bad where the hosts can discuss topics without a filter.
- As part of the WEEI/NESN Jimmy Fund Radio Telethon, Dennis and Callahan met Avalanna Routh, the same girl with a rare brain cancer known as AT/RT who got to "marry" Justin Bieber and became great admirers of hers. When she died in September 2012, they mourned her death on air. One time during a Jimmy Fund visit, Routh had painted Callahan's nails - and he keeps one of them painted in Routh's memory.
- When Glenn Ordway, the former longtime host of The Big Show, WEEI's afternoon program, filled in for Dennis one morning, D&C brought back a long-running Big Show segment, "The Whiner Line", in which callers get to leave voice mails about anything and everything, whether it be praise, blame or something outlandish.

== Awards and recognition ==
- Placed 93rd on the trade journal Talkers Magazine list of the 2007 "Heavy Hundred". The list ranks what the magazine considers the most popular, influential, or entertaining talk-show hosts from around the country.
