= NESN =

US sports television network

New England Sports Network
- Type: Regional sports network
- Country: United States
- Broadcast area: New England (except Fairfield County, CT); Nationwide (via satellite, select cable providers)
- Headquarters: Watertown, Massachusetts

Programming
- Language: English
- Picture format: 480i (SDTV); 1080i (HDTV); 2160p (4K UHD)

Ownership
- Owner: Fenway Sports Group (80%); Delaware North (20%)
- Sister channels: SportsNet Pittsburgh

History
- Launched: April 4, 1984; 42 years ago

Links
- Website: nesn.com

Availability

Terrestrial
- DirecTV: 628; 628-1 (NESN+)

Streaming media
- NESN 360: nesn.com/nesn360/
- DirecTV Stream: Internet Protocol television
- FuboTV: Internet Protocol television

New England Sports Network, popularly known as NESN /nɛs.ɛn/, is an American regional sports cable and satellite television network owned by a joint venture of Fenway Sports Group (which owns a controlling 80% interest, and is the owner of the Boston Red Sox and Liverpool Football Club) and Delaware North (which owns the remaining 20% interest in the network as well as the Boston Bruins and TD Garden, home of the Bruins and the Boston Celtics). Headquartered in Watertown, Massachusetts, the network is primarily carried on cable providers throughout New England (except in Fairfield County, Connecticut, which is part of the greater New York City media market). NESN is also distributed nationally on satellite providers DirecTV and as NESN National via select cable providers.

NESN is the primary broadcaster of the Boston Red Sox and the Boston Bruins – serving as the exclusive home for all games that are not televised by a national network. NESN also carries minor league baseball games, regional college sports events, various outdoor and sports talk shows. The network has become synonymous with local sports in New England, and is considered a local institution.

== History ==
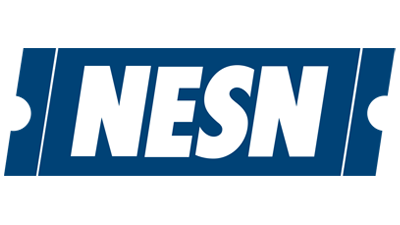
NESN's logo from 1990 to 2019.

The New England Sports Network launched on April 4, 1984, originally operating as a joint-venture of the Boston Red Sox, Boston Bruins, and Storer Communications (the owner of WSBK-TV). The new service which featured 90 Red Sox and 40 Bruins games during its first year was sold as a premium channel with prices ranging from $7.50 to $10 per month. A number of these games were previously aired on WSBK.

In 1996, NESN became the New England affiliate of Fox Sports Net (FSN), carrying the network's national sports and magazine programs; this lasted until 1999. In January 1998, then-FSN parent News Corporation acquired partial ownership of Cablevision-owned SportsChannel New England (and its sister networks), turning it into Fox Sports Net New England (now NBC Sports Boston). However, despite the name change Fox Sports New England was blocked from carrying any FSN programming due to NESN's existing affiliation agreement. Fox had hoped to negotiate an early termination of that agreement, but had to wait until it expired on December 31, 1999.

NESN converted into a basic cable service in 2001, a model that has since been copied by other companies through their respective launches of new regional sports networks as well as similar conversions (many of which predate NESN's transition) of those that began as pay services. Afterwards, until early 2006, NESN carried simulcasts of ESPNews during the afternoon and overnight hours. NESN has carried regional Atlantic Coast Conference college basketball games since Boston College joined the conference, including games distributed for national broadcast for and by Fox Sports Networks.

In September 2003, NESN began producing Red Sox games in high definition. In April 2006, NESN launched a full-time HD feed, after having re-located its operations from Fenway Park to a newly built studio in Watertown with expanded production capabilities.

In 2013, NESN (through Fenway Sports Group) placed a bid to acquire the New England Media Group from The New York Times Company, which would have placed it under the common ownership of The Boston Globe; Fenway dropped out of the bidding in July.

On August 30, 2014, the network became a charter cable affiliate of the American Sports Network, a sports syndication service founded by the Sinclair Broadcast Group, with its first ASN broadcast being a college football game between the Old Dominion Monarchs and the Hampton Pirates. NESN and NESN National also agreed to carry certain games from the inaugural season of the Fall Experimental Football League in October and November 2014.

On June 1, 2022, NESN became the first U.S. regional sports network to offer its content on a direct-to-consumer basis.

On February 24, 2023, Warner Bros. Discovery, owners of AT&T SportsNet, announced that it would leave the RSN business. This included AT&T SportsNet Pittsburgh, the broadcasting home of the Pittsburgh Penguins, which were purchased by FSG in late 2021. In August 2023, in a move predicted by sportswriters after the initial announcement, the Penguins announced that they would acquire the channel and relaunch it as SportsNet Pittsburgh in October 2023, with NESN handling day-to-day operations from its studios in Watertown. In December 2023, the Pittsburgh Pirates also acquired a stake in SportsNet Pittsburgh, maintaining its presence on the network.

In April 2026, amid the closedown of FanDuel Sports Network and other volatility in the RSN market, NESN president David Wisnia revealed that FSG was actively pursuing opportunities to "operate or buy" other local sports media operations, telling Sports Business Journal that "if there’s an opportunity that makes sense for us, for them, we'll happily have those conversations."

== Sports coverage ==
=== Boston Red Sox ===
NESN has provided coverage of the Boston Red Sox's Major League Baseball games since the network's initial spring training game broadcast upon its March 21, 1984, launch. NESN now carries full coverage of Red Sox games (with the exception of some games nationally broadcast on Fox and ESPN) as well as in-depth pre-game and post-game shows. For its first two decades, NESN split coverage with broadcast television stations in the team's market territory, with an increasing number of games moving to NESN. Since 2006, NESN is the exclusive home of all Red Sox games that are not nationally televised, using the slogan "One Nation, One Network" to signify this. In 2006, NESN became the first regional sports network to broadcast all Major League Baseball games in high definition (however, spring training games continued to be broadcast in standard definition until 2012), through the launch of its simulcast feed NESN HD.

On August 25, 2015, NESN announced that Don Orsillo, a Red Sox announcer since 2001, would not return following the 2015 season, and that his replacement would be Dave O'Brien, who had been a Red Sox Radio Network voice since 2007. NESN's decision to replace Orsillo, a fan-favorite and Massachusetts native, was met with considerable outrage and disappointment by Red Sox fans. Orsillo's broadcast partner, the late Jerry Remy, was emotional following the announcement, calling the previous 15 years "an absolute pleasure [...] I've been very fortunate because I've worked with a lot of good people, and he's right at the top of the list." Fox Sports San Diego subsequently announced that Orsillo had been hired as the new play-by-play voice of the San Diego Padres, succeeding Dick Enberg (who would be retiring after the 2016 season).

For Red Sox game broadcasts, Dave O'Brien currently serves as play-by-play announcer, with Lou Merloni as his primary color commentator, and Jahmai Webster serving as the field reporter. Other former Red Sox players such as Will Middlebrooks and Kevin Millar also contribute as color commentators.

In 2021, NESN produced all Red Sox home games in 4K with HDR, making it the second team (behind the Toronto Blue Jays and Sportsnet), and first U.S. team, to produce their home games in 4K.

==== Post-game ====
Following each game telecast, NESN airs W.B. Mason's Extra Innings and Red Sox Final, in which Tom Caron and one or more of the studio analysts from the pre-game show deliver a wrap-up of that night's game from the studio. The team presents highlights and statistics from the preceding game and often have a team member of the Red Sox on hand to get their take on the game. This hour of coverage also focuses on the game to be played next on the preseason/seasonal game schedule, as well as news from the league. The post-game is usually not covered if the Red Sox play a game held on the west coast; NESN Sports Today immediately follows the game in those instances. Since 2006, NESN has broadcast the postgame show from its Watertown studios; it had previously been broadcast from its Fenway Park studio.

=== College sports coverage ===
- Hockey East men's and women's ice hockey regular season, postseason, and championships
- Holy Cross Crusaders men's and women's ice hockey
- UMass Minutemen and Minutewomen men's and women's basketball and insider programming
- Northeastern Huskies men's and women's basketball and insider programming
- Merrimack Warriors men's and women's basketball
- Ivy League athletics, including football, men's and women's basketball, and Olympic sporting events
- Beanpot college ice hockey tournament
- Boston College Eagles insider programming
- Northeast Conference men's and women's basketball (also airs on NESN Nation)
- Stonehill Skyhawks college football (also airs on NESN Nation)

NESN was a former affiliate of the ACC on Regional Sports Networks package, which included football, men’s and women’s basketball, and Olympic sporting events from all 15 ACC schools, including Boston College locally. These games have since been moved to The CW as of 2023. Through the late 2010’s, the network served as an affiliate of Fox Sports Networks and the American Sports Network, giving it access to collegiate sports events from the AHA, American Athletic Conference, Atlantic 10, Big 12, Big East, CAA, Conference USA, ECAC, Pac-12, and Patriot League, among other conferences. Additional collegiate programming formerly carried by NESN includes Southern New Hampshire University athletics, UMass football, and the Coaches vs. Cancer annual basketball event held at TD Garden.

=== Other sports events ===
NESN airs several minor league baseball games from the Worcester Red Sox (a AAA affiliate of the Red Sox) each season, as well as Futures at Fenway, a doubleheader featuring the WooSox and the Portland Sea Dogs. Tom Caron handles the play-by-play with Bob Montgomery as color commentator. Futures at Fenway hasn't been played in 10 years since 2014.

Since 2019, NESN has also aired a package of games involving the Cape Cod Baseball League.

For many years, NESN has aired several minor professional ice hockey games from the Providence Bruins (an AHL affiliate of the Bruins).

From 2008 to 2014, NESN aired the New England Regional of the Little League World Series each August. Coverage ended after ESPN acquired the rights to the entirety of the regional tournaments.

From November 2015 to March 2023, NESN aired the home games of the Boston Pride of the National Women's Hockey League.

In October 2023, NESN showed coverage of the British Basketball League, airing what was to be the final season of that competition.

In December 2023, NESN and Rhode Island FC of the USL Championship announced a multi-year partnership to broadcast select matches starting in 2024.

As of 2024, NESN became the official broadcast partner of the Professional Women's Hockey League (PWHL).

In 2024, NESN and NESN+ also began televising a package of games involving the Hartford Yard Goats (a AA affiliate of the Colorado Rockies).

In 2025, NESN announced that they would broadcast select home matches of the USL League One soccer team Portland Hearts of Pine.

NESN also airs various soccer and tennis matches.

As of 2025, NESN became the official broadcast partner of the Athletes Unlimited Softball League (AUSL).

== Programming ==
=== Current ===
- Bruins Classics – A showcase of vintage Boston Bruins games condensed to fit a one-hour time slot.
- Celebrity Spotlight
- Charlie Moore Outdoors – A fishing and outdoors show, hosted by Charlie Moore.
- Dirty Water TV – A lifestyle show covering the best parties, hottest venues, and coolest destinations in New England nightlife
- Dining Playbook – A sports-themed look at the New England food and dining scene featuring celebrity chefs and favorite restaurants of local athletes
- Friday Night Fenway – a half-hour program that airs before the Red Sox pregame show on Friday nights when the Red Sox play a home game. Tom Caron serves as host, along with a rotating group of analysts.
- Golf Destination
- NESN Clubhouse – A live Red Sox pregame show aimed at children; airs on Sundays when NESN is scheduled to broadcast a Red Sox game.
- The Brick's – An awards show showcasing the top moments and players from the first half of the Bruins' season; a postseason edition of the show is also broadcast.
- Red Sox Classics – A showcase of old Red Sox games that have been deemed classics because of an event of significance that occurred in the game or a player achieving a certain record. Walk Off Sox is essentially identical, but incorporating games that featured a walk-off win by the Red Sox.
- The Red Sox Report – A Red Sox analysis program hosted by Tom Caron.
- The Remy's – An awards show showcasing the top moments and players from the first half of the Red Sox's season; a postseason edition is also broadcast. Jonathan Papelbon was named the inaugural "Top Dawg" recipient in 2006.
- Sox in 2/Bruins in 2 – A two-hour replay of the previous night's game, usually aired at 12:00 a.m. and on the following day in the early afternoon (it is not aired when the Red Sox and Bruins play a game in the Pacific Time Zone).
- The Ultimate Red Sox Show – A weekly show recapping the week in Red Sox Nation.
- Wicked Bites – A show focusing on some of the more fun and unique food destinations throughout New England.
- NESN Shuffle -a 30-minute show airing a mix of highlights from NESN's first 4 decades; hosted by Jahmai Webster and Sophia Jurksztowicz on an alternating basis.
- NESN Rundown -a 30-60 minute show featuring the best segments from NESN-produced podcasts. The show is hosted by a rotating group of NESN personalities.
- Unobstructed Views -a periodic "alt-cast" series on NESN+ for Red Sox games(hosted by Jared Carrabis, Jonathan Papelbon and Alanna Rizzo) and Bruins games(hosted by Patrice Bergeron, Tuukka Rask and Andrew Raycroft).
- Behind the B-A behind-the-scenes look at the Boston Bruins, narrated by Denis Leary.

=== Former ===
- The Big Bad Bruins Live – A weekly look into the happenings of the Boston Bruins, focusing on the top stories of the week surrounding the team, with segments about its history. The show is hosted by Dale Arnold and features a rotating panel of expert analysts.
- The Instigators Live – A debate show featuring Bruins analysts that focuses on the latest hockey news, hosted by Jack Edwards, Andy Brickley and Billy Jaffe. The program was originally hosted by Edwards, Brickley and Mike Milbury; with Bob Beers and Lyndon Byers as substitutes.
- NESN Live – Nightly sports news program featuring live reports and coverage of all of the major sports teams in the Boston area, cancelled in February 2018.
- Breakfast with the Sox/Breakfast with the Bruins – A one-hour replay of the previous night's Red Sox or Bruins game. Originally aired when the Red Sox played a game on the west coast, it was later expanded to air every morning after a game; a version focusing on Bruins games debuted in 2007. The program ended in November 2010 when NESN began airing a simulcast of Dennis and Callahan.
- Dennis and Callahan – A three-hour simulcast of a WEEI weekday morning sports talk show hosted by John Dennis and Gerry Callahan.
- NESN After Hours – A weeknight one hour infotainment program that debuted on December 2, 2019, replacing NESN Sports Today, typically airing between 10p-12a and repeated at 2AM and 5AM the following morning. Shortened to a half-hour, solo anchor format by November 2021 following the departure of co-host Emerson Lotzia, Jr. Cancelled March 11, 2022
- NESN's Comedy All Stars – A half-hour series featuring various stand-up comics; most of the jokes are geared towards Boston sports.
- NESN Daily – A nightly half-hour sports news program that debuted on August 6, 2010, replacing SportsDesk; the program ended on June 10, 2013.
- NESN Sports Today - A nightly half-hour sports news program that replaced NESN Daily in June 2013 and was replaced by NESN After Hours in December 2019
- NESN Sports Update – A 30-minute sports news show pre-recorded the night before repeated throughout the 6-10 AM time period (6-9 AM Saturdays and Sundays.) Cancelled March 11, 2022
- NESN Sports Weekend - A 30-minute sports news show that airs from 10PM-12AM Saturdays and Sundays and repeated on Sunday and Monday mornings from 4-6 AM. Cancelled March 11, 2022
- Pocket Money – A half-hour game show, hosted by Paul "Fitzy" Fitzgerald (played by Nick Stevens), that took place on the streets of Boston, in which fans were asked sports trivia questions. SportsTime Ohio and SportsNet New York air a similar program called Beer Money.
- Red Sox Hot Stove – A Red Sox program airing during the Major League Baseball offseason; hosted by Tom Caron, the program also features appearances from many guest stars such as Gordon Edes, Nick Cafardo and Jerry Remy.
- Ring of Honor Wrestling
- Sox Appeal – A Red Sox-themed reality dating show that debuted in August 2007, which followed a man or woman during three, two-inning-long blind dates that take place over the course of one of the team's games.
- SportsDesk – A twice-daily half-hour program that featured reports on teams of importance to New England viewers and their players. It was generally shown during the evening after Red Sox or Bruins game coverage. NESN also reran the program in half-hour blocks from 5:00 to 8:00 a.m. (or 9:00 a.m. on mornings when the Bruins or Red Sox did not play). Jade McCarthy and Cole Wright were the lead anchors; Jayme Parker served as a reporter. Regular contributors included Tony Massarotti, former Celtic Dana Barros, former Patriot Ted Johnson, Mike Adams and James Murphy.
- SportsDesk Lights Out – A weekly wrap-up program that aired Sundays at 10:00 p.m. with a rebroadcast at 11:00 p.m. It was hosted by Cole Wright or Jade McCarthy, and generally covered the top sports stories of the week.
- UFC Wired
- World Wrestling Federation monthly television specials from Boston Garden.

== On-air staff ==
=== Current on-air staff ===
- Judd Sirott - Bruins play by play announcer
- Andy Brickley – Bruins color commentator and host of On Course with Andy Brickley
- Tom Caron – Red Sox studio host and Hockey East play-by-play
- Lenny DiNardo – Red Sox studio analyst
- Billy Jaffe – Bruins studio analyst
- Sophia Jurksztowicz – Bruins rinkside reporter and NESN Shuffle host
- Denis Leary - Narrator of Behind The B
- Darnell McDonald – Red Sox studio analyst
- Lou Merloni – Red Sox color analyst
- Will Middlebrooks – Red Sox color and studio analyst
- Kevin Millar – Red Sox color analyst
- Mike Monaco – Red Sox secondary play-by-play
- Charlie Moore – host of Charlie Moore Outdoors and Bruins Academy
- Dave O'Brien – Red Sox play-by-play
- Jonathan Papelbon – Red Sox studio analyst/co-host of "Unobstructed Views"(Red Sox version)
- Barry Pederson – Bruins studio analyst
- Adam Pellerin – Red Sox fill-in studio host and NESN Clubhouse host
- Andrew Raycroft – Bruins studio analyst
- Jim Rice – Red Sox studio analyst
- Jahmai Webster – Red Sox sideline reporter and NESN Shuffle host
- Kevin Youkilis – Red Sox color analyst
- Alanna Rizzo - Red Sox reporter/co-host of "Unobstructed Views"(Red Sox version)
- Jared Carrabis - co-host of "Unobstructed Views"(Red Sox version)

=== Notable former on-air staff ===
- Mike Andrews
- Guerin Austin
- Dana Barros
- Robyn Brown
- Ellis Burks
- Steve Burton (now at WBZ-TV in Boston)
- Lyndon Byers
- Tina Cervasio (now at WNYW in New York City and CBS Sports Network)
- John Chandler (now at WNBC in New York City
- Jim Corsi
- Fred Cusick
- Jenny Dell (now at CBS Sports Network)
- Kent Derdivanis
- Dennis Eckersley
- Jack Edwards
- Jamie Erdahl (now at CBS Sports)
- Alex Faust
- Eric Frede
- Naoko Funayama
- Peter Gammons (now at MLB Network)
- Glenn Geffner
- Cealey Godwin - former host of NESN After Hours
- Jonny Gomes
- Kara Henderson
- Ted Johnson
- Camille Kostek – Dirty Water TV (2016–2017)
- Gord Kluzak – former Bruins studio analyst
- Bob Kurtz
- Tom Larson
- Emerson Lotzia, Jr. (now at DraftKings)
- Steve Lyons
- Hazel Mae (now Sportsnet field reporter for Toronto Blue Jays games)
- Ken Macha
- Ned Martin
- Tony Massarotti
- Jade McCarthy
- David McCarty
- Sean McDonough (now at ESPN)
- Mike Milbury
- Dawn Mitchell
- Bob Montgomery
- Mark Mowers
- Wendi Nix (now at ESPN)
- Don Orsillo (now announcing on the San Diego Padres syndicated network)
- Eric Reid
- Jerry Remy (died in 2021)
- Bob Rodgers
- Derek Sanderson
- Randy Scott
- Dave Shea
- Rob Simpson
- Al Skinner
- Matt Stairs
- Amy Stone
- Gary Striewski
- Kathryn Tappen (now at NBC Sports)
- Debbi Taylor
- Mo Vaughn
- Tim Wakefield (died in 2023)
- Heidi Watney (now Apple TV+ reporter)
- Jermaine Wiggins (now analyst at NBC Sports Boston and talk show host at WEEI)
- Cole Wright

== Related services ==
=== NESN 360 ===
NESN 360 (formerly NESNgo) is NESN's streaming platform, allowing NESN subscribers to stream live and video on demand content (including classic games and game replays) from the network. It first launched in May 2017.

On June 1, 2022, NESNgo was relaunched as NESN 360, an over-the-top streaming platform allowing viewers to subscribe to NESN as a standalone service. The service made NESN the first U.S. regional sports network to offer its content on a direct-to-consumer basis. The service was priced at $29.99 per-month and $329.99 per-year, with the latter also including eight tickets to Red Sox games as a promotional offer. NESN 360 uses the same architecture previously used by NESNgo, and remains available at no additional charge to those who subscribe to NESN through a traditional television provider. Due to regional rights restrictions, the service is only available to users in New England. (Excluding Fairfield County, CT)

=== NESN+ ===
NESN+, also styled as NESNPlus, is a companion channel to NESN that operates mostly in the event that two sports events NESN has the rights to are subject to scheduling conflicts. Originally, Comcast systems in the region utilized New England Cable News or CN8 to carry the NESNPlus broadcasts, while other systems placed NESNPlus on an otherwise unused or local public access channel. DirecTV added NESNPlus in both standard definition and high definition on April 11, 2009.

Collegiate events, including Atlantic Coast Conference telecasts, Umass football and Hockey East telecasts, as well as NESN's coverage of the minor league Worcester Red Sox and NESN's coverage of the WNBA's Connecticut Sun are often moved to NESN+ in the event of a conflict with NESN's Red Sox or Bruins coverage.

=== NESN National ===
NESN National is a separate feed of NESN for cable systems located outside of New England. It carries alternate programming during Red Sox and Bruins games, but does air the network's pre-game and post-game shows. Launched in September 2010, Time Warner Cable became the first provider to carry the national feed, initially on its systems in North and South Carolina. Bright House Networks added NESN National on its Michigan systems on November 1, 2010. Verizon Fios added it in New Jersey in December of that year. NESN National differs from the regular feed of NESN that is available nationally on DirecTV in which Red Sox and/or Bruins games are viewable outside of New England with a subscription to MLB Extra Innings and/or NHL Center Ice.

=== NESN Nation ===
NESN Nation is a FAST channel launched in 2025. As of January 2025, NESN Nation was available on The Roku Channel and Plex. NESN Nation agreed to broadcast four Northeast Conference college basketball games in 2025. The games include one men's regular-season game featuring Mercyhurst at Stonehill on February 15, one semifinal game of the NEC men's tournament, one women's regular-season game featuring Wagner at Saint Francis and one semifinal game of the NEC women's tournament.

=== NESN.com ===
NESN.com generally contains sportswriting, with a minimum of video content, compiling general Boston team and national sports news, along with other sections involving professional wrestling, mixed martial arts, automotive, fantasy sports and sports betting. The site is affiliated with the Fox Sports website, and syndicates some content.

The site's set up is in a focused manner that divides it into separate sections where different sports writers cover each scene. In this way, NESN reporters produce original content that develops in their field areas. Some reporters are full time exclusively to NESN.com while other stories are contributed by NESN reporters from other fields of NESN, such as broadcasting.

The content and construction of the articles themselves vary drastically. Some provide in-depth analysis of current events happening with Boston teams, while others provide quick updates with videos. A majority of the articles, however, are purely factual and present interviews with players and coaches. Some articles also focus on new trade rumors or free agent pick ups. The primary subscriber and reader of NESN.com is male. NESN.com is the most recently added product that contributed to NESN being "the eighth-most valuable sports brand in the world in 2013."

== See also ==
- Sports in New England
- MASN, a similar network operating in the Mid-Atlantic
- SportsNet Pittsburgh, a sister network operating in Western Pennsylvania
- NBC Sports Boston, another New England-based regional sports network
