= Gerry Callahan =

American journalist

Gerald Callahan is a radio show host best known for hosting a longtime morning program for WEEI-FM, a sports radio station in the Boston market. He began his career as a sports reporter for The Sun in Lowell in 1983, then the Boston Herald in 1989. From 1994 to 1997, he also wrote for Sports Illustrated, including coverage for the magazine's daily edition for the 1996 Summer Olympics. He currently hosts the Gerry Callahan Show, a podcast discussing politics, sports and media. Craig Acone is the most recent producer. Dave Cullinane and Matthew Carano were the first two producers in order of service.

== Early life ==
Callahan, a Chelmsford native, graduated from UMass Amherst in 1985 with a degree in Communications after having transferred from the University of Maine. He was elected to the Chelmsford High School Hall of Fame.

== WEEI ==
After filling in on The Big Show with Boston radio legend Glenn Ordway, Callahan received his own show with co-host John Dennis in 1997. The Dennis & Callahan Show was a staple for sports fan in Boston, producing strong ratings consistently throughout its tenure. In 2016, co-host John Dennis stepped down to focus on his health, paving the rise for controversial star Kirk Minihane and the infamous Kirk & Callahan show.

"“The difference between our show and other shows in the market is that we’re fearless and honest,” Minihane told me yesterday. “We also have fun. It sounds like it does when guys are talking. I’ll listen to other shows and I’ll say, ‘I don’t know any guys who talk like that.’” “We’re doing it our way,” Callahan said. “We had a stretch where we were under orders to be extremely boring — unfortunately. We were not allowed to talk about politics or pop culture or movies or our personal lives. We were just supposed to do real boring sports talk and listeners don’t like that.”

At its peak, the Kirk & Callahan show was consistently the number one rated sports talk show in Boston, beating competitor Toucher & Rich in the head-to-head for males 25 -54. In 2017, in response to attacks by the show on his family, activist Bob Murchison started a successful campaign to cripple the financial success of the show, by consistently emailing advertisers of the program with quotes from the show he deemed offensive. This led to Minihane permanently leaving the show in 2018, with heavy controversy surrounding his departure.

Callahan remained with the station until July 2019, hosting the Mut & Callahan show with co-host Mike "Mut" Mutnansky. The show did not produce the same ratings success as Callahan's previous shows, and led to his unceremonious removal from the station. Shortly after his last show was over on July 12, 2019, Callahan tweeted “After 20 years in morning drive, I did my last show on WEEI this morning. Thanks to all who listened. Unfortunately this ain’t a movie. Sometimes the bad guys win. Much more to come.” Callahan was replaced in the morning drive by the Greg Hill show, hosted by Greg Hill.

== The Gerry Callahan Show ==
On January 7, 2020, Callahan launched his podcast, first known as the Gerry Callahan Podcast. The show advertised the mantra: "Politics, Sports and Revenge," and gave Callahan his first opportunity to speak to listeners in a truly open and uncensored format. Airing live every Monday-Friday morning, the show covers the stories of the day, specifically focused on tackling the political issues Callahan was not allowed to speak about on radio. Guests Tom Shattuck, Alex Reimer, and Aidan "Turtleboy" Kearney have appeared on the program and occasionally offer a diverse selection of opinions for debate. The Gerry Callahan Show is still actively releasing content.

== Controversies ==
On September 29, 2003, during a segment called 'headlines', where they read and comment about current news stories, Callahan and his morning co-host John Dennis were discussing a story about an escaped gorilla. The gorilla had escaped from the Franklin Park Zoo and had been recaptured at a bus stop. According to newspaper articles, the exchange allegedly was:

Callahan: "They caught him at a bus stop, right -- he was like waiting to catch a bus out of town."

Dennis: "Yeah, yeah -- he's a METCO gorilla."

Callahan: "Heading out to Lexington."

Dennis: "Exactly."

METCO is a state program that buses inner-city Boston students to nearby suburban schools. Dennis and Callahan were accused of comparing the gorilla to poor, mostly African-American children METCO busses often cater to. WEEI general manager Tom Baker suspended both hosts for two days, then extended the suspension to two weeks after the Blue Cross-Blue Shield (Blue Cross Blue Shield of Massachusetts) pulled $27,000 in ads and in turn donated that money to METCO. Dunkin' Donuts responded by ceasing all advertising that involved the voices of John Dennis or Gerry Callahan. Both hosts were sent to sensitivity training. WEEI also agreed to provide free advertising for the METCO program on the radio station. In November 2003, WEEI General Manager Tom Baker was replaced by Julie Kahn. Station executives denied there was a connection between the METCO incident and Baker's replacement.

== 2007 extended absence ==
Callahan was on medical leave from the program from mid-April to August 2007. According to Jason Wolfe, the vice president of programming for Entercom Boston, Callahan underwent a "minor surgical procedure," and worked with a voice therapist. The Boston Globe later reported that the surgery was to remove polyps from his throat which had made him hoarse. During Callahan's absence, the co-host responsibilities were covered by several local sports media personalities including Bob Neumeier, Dale Arnold, Steve DeOssie, and Larry Johnson.

During his absence, rumors circulated that Callahan's absence was, in fact, a contract negotiation ploy. The station's contract for both hosts was scheduled to expire at the end of September 2007. Callahan is quoted as ridiculing those rumors:

"[It] is kind of funny," he said. "I mean, I spent a month on the air sounding like Phil Leotardo from The Sopranos, and then I went out sick for half the spring [ratings] book. So who do I look like, Asante Samuel? . . . I wish I were back now, but for a change, I'm not going to do anything stupid. I'm going to listen to my doctor and heal up, and hopefully, I'll be back on the air before I run out of Percocets."

On June 25, 2007, vice president of programming Jason Wolfe again addressed Callahan's absence with the following statement:

"We appreciate everyone’s interest in Gerry Callahan’s health, [he] is talking, but his voice is still relatively weak and hoarse. We fully expect him to be back to his cranky old self soon, but he is not ready to return to work at this point."

On August 3, 2007, the Boston Globe reported that Callahan expected to be back at work by mid-August, and he, in fact, was scheduled to return to the show on August 13, 2007, but his return was put on hold as the show was suspended.

On August 14, 2008, Callahan revealed in his column that he had actually been treated for cancer during his long absence. He admitted that when he underwent routine surgery to remove a polyp, a malignant tumor was discovered requiring him to undergo two additional surgeries and 6 weeks of Radiation therapy.
