= Praefectus urbi =

Magistrate of Rome

The praefectus urbanus, also called praefectus urbi or urban prefect in English, was praefect of the city of Rome, and later also of Constantinople. The office originated under the Roman kings, continued during the Republic and Empire, and held high importance in late Antiquity. The office survived the collapse of the Western Roman Empire, and the last urban prefect of Rome, named Iohannes, is attested in 599. In the East, in Constantinople, the office survived until the 13th century.

== Regal period ==
According to Roman tradition, in 753 BC when Romulus founded the city of Rome and instituted the monarchy, he also created the office of custos urbis (guardian of the city) to serve as the king's chief lieutenant. Appointed by the king to serve for life, the custos urbis served concurrently as the princeps Senatus. As the second highest office of state, the custos urbis was the king's personal representative. In the absence of the king from the city, the custos urbis exercised all of his powers, which included the powers of convoking the Senate, the popular assemblies and the exercise of force in the event of an emergency. However, the imperium he possessed was valid only within the walls of Rome.

Under the kings, only three men held the position. The first king Romulus appointed Denter Romulius to serve as the first custos urbis, the third king Tullus Hostilius appointed Numa Marcius, and the seventh king Tarquinius Superbus appointed Spurius Lucretius.

== Republican period ==
After the expulsion of Tarquinius Superbus in 510 BC and the formation of the Republic in 509 BC, the office of custos urbis remained unaltered: having power only within the actual city of Rome and a life term appointed by the consuls. The custos urbis exercised within the city all the powers of the consuls if they were absent from Rome. These powers included: convoking the Senate and Comitia Curiata, and, in times of war, levying and commanding legions.

The first major change to the office occurred in 487 BC, when the office became an elective magistracy, elected by the Comitia Curiata. The office was only open to former consuls. Around 450 BC, with the coming of the decemvirs, the office of the custos urbis was renamed the praefectus urbi (Prefect of the City of Rome), and was stripped of most of its powers and responsibilities, becoming a merely ceremonial post. Most of the office's powers and responsibilities had been transferred to the urban praetor (praetor urbanus). The praefectus urbi was appointed each year for the sole purpose of allowing the consuls to celebrate the Latin Festival, which required them to leave Rome. The praefectus urbi no longer held the power to convoke the Senate, or the right of speaking in it, and was appointed by the Consuls instead of being elected.

== Imperial period ==
=== Rome ===
When the first Roman Emperor, Augustus (r. 27 BC – AD 14), transformed the Roman Republic into the Roman Empire in 27 BC, he reformed the office of Prefect at the suggestion of his minister and friend Maecenas. Again elevated into a magistracy, Augustus granted the praefectus urbi all the powers needed to maintain order within the city. The office's powers also extended beyond Rome itself to the ports of Ostia and the Portus, as well as a zone of one hundred Roman miles (c. 140 km) around the city. The Prefect's office was called the secretarium tellurense (secretariat of Tellus). The find-spots of inscriptions honouring Prefects suggest that it was located on the Oppian Hill, near the Baths of Trajan. Acting as a quasi-mayor of Rome, the Prefect was the superintendent of all guilds and corporations (collegia), held the responsibility (via the praefectus annonae) of the city's provision with grain from overseas, the oversight of the officials responsible for the drainage of the Tiber and the maintenance of the city's sewers and water supply system, as well as its monuments. The provisioning of the city's large population with the grain dole was especially important; when the Prefect failed to secure adequate supplies, riots often broke out.

To enable the Prefect to exercise his authority, the cohortes urbanae, Rome's police force, and the nightwatchmen (vigiles) under their prefect (praefectus vigilum), were placed under his command. The Prefect also had the duty of publishing the laws promulgated by the Emperor, and as such acquired a legal jurisdiction. This extended to legal cases between slaves and their masters, patrons and their freedmen, and over sons who had violated the pietas towards their parents. Gradually, the judicial powers of the Prefect expanded, as the Prefect's office began to re-assume its old powers from the praetor urbanus. Eventually there was no appeal from the Prefect's sentencing, except to that of the Roman Emperor, unlike the sentencing of other officials. Even the governors of the Roman provinces were subject to the Prefect's jurisdiction. The Prefect also possessed judicial powers over criminal matters. Originally these powers were exercised in conjunction with those of the quaestors, but by the 3rd century, they were exercised alone.

In late Antiquity, the office gained in effective power, as the imperial court was removed from the city, meaning that the prefects were no longer under the emperor's direct supervision. The office was usually held by leading members of Italy's senatorial aristocracy, who remained largely pagan even after Emperor Constantine the Great's conversion to Christianity. Over the following thirty years, Christian holders were few. In such a capacity, Quintus Aurelius Symmachus played a prominent role in the controversy over the Altar of Victory in the late 4th century.

The urban prefecture survived the fall of the Western Roman Empire, and remained active under the Ostrogothic Kingdom and well after the Byzantine reconquest. The last mention of the Roman urban prefect occurs as late as 879.

=== Constantinople ===
When the Emperor Constantine the Great (r. 306–337) named Constantinople the capital of the Roman Empire, he also established a proconsul to oversee the city. In the late 350s, Constantius II (r. 337–361) expanded the city's Senate and set it as equal to that of Rome. Correspondingly, on 11 September or 11 December 359, Constantinople was also granted an urban prefect, commonly called in English the Eparch from his Greek title (ὁ ἔπαρχος τῆς πόλεως, ho eparchos tēs poleōs). The prefect was one of the emperor's chief lieutenants: like his Roman counterpart, the Constantinopolitan prefect was a member of the highest senatorial class, the illustres, and came immediately after the praetorian prefects in the imperial hierarchy. As such, the office possessed great prestige and extensive authority, and was one of the few high state offices which could not be occupied by a eunuch. The prefect was also the formal head of the Senate, presiding over its meetings. Hence, the prefect's nomination had to be formally ratified by the Senate, and unlike the other senior administrative positions of the state (praetorian prefects and diocesan vicars) with their military connotations, the office's ancient and purely civilian origins were emphasized by the prefect's wearing of the toga as a ceremonial garb.

The prefect was solely responsible for the administration of the city of Constantinople and its immediate area. His tasks were manifold, ranging from the maintenance of order to the regulation and supervision of all guilds, corporations and public institutions. The city police, the ταξιῶται (taxiōtai), came under the prefect's authority, and the city jail was located at the basement of his official residence, the praetorium, located before the Forum of Constantine. As with the Prefect of Rome, the night watch came under a subordinate prefect, the νυκτέπαρχος (nykteparchos, "night prefect"). In the 530s, however, some authority for the policing and regulation of the city passed to two new offices, created by Justinian I (r. 527–565). In 535 the praitōr of the demoi (πραίτωρ τῶν δήμων; praetor plebis in Latin), who commanded 20 soldiers and 30 firemen, was put in charge of policing and firefighting, while in 539, the office of the quaesitor (κοιαισίτωρ) was established and tasked with limiting the uncontrolled immigration to the city from the provinces, with supervising public mores, and with prosecuting sexual offenders and heretics.

In the middle Byzantine period (7th–12th centuries), the prefect was regarded as the supreme judge in the capital, after the emperor himself. His role in the economical life of the city was also of principal importance. The 10th-century Book of the Prefect stipulates the various rules for the various guilds that fell under the prefect's authority. The prefect was also responsible for the appointment of the teachers to the University of Constantinople, and for the distribution of the grain dole to the city. According to the late 9th-century Klētorologion, his two principal aides were the symponos and the logothetēs tou praitōriou. In addition, there were the heads (γειτονιάρχαι, geitoniarchai, the old curatores regionum) and judges (kritai) of the city's districts (Latin regiones, in Greek ρεγεῶναι, regeōnai), the parathalassitēs (παραθαλασσίτης), an official responsible for the capital's seashore and ports, as well as their tolls, and several inspectors (epoptai), the heads of the guilds (exarchoi) and the boullōtai, whose function was to check and append the seal of the eparch on weights and scales as well as merchandise.

The office continued until the early 13th century with its functions and authority relatively intact, and may possibly have survived into the Latin Empire following the capture of the city in the Fourth Crusade in 1204, being equated in Latin with the castellanus of the city. After the reconquest of the city by the Byzantines, however, the office of the Eparch was replaced throughout the Palaiologan period (1261–1453) by several kephalatikeuontes (sing. kephalatikeuōn, κεφαλατικεύων, "headsman"), who each oversaw a district in the now much less populous capital.

== Prefect Agrippa of the "Acts of Peter" ==
In the apocryphal 2nd-century "Acts of Peter", the apostle preaches in Rome to the concubines of "prefect Agrippa" that they should practise abstinence and chastity. The enraged prefect orders Peter to be crucified, to which Peter requests to be crucified upside-down. This narrative is set in the time of Emperor Nero. There is no historical or archaeological record of such a prefect.

== Bibliography ==
- Tacitus Ann. 6.11
- Cassius Dio 59.13
- Dig. 1.12; 4.4.16; 5.1.12; 4.8.19
- Dujcev, Ivan, ed. (1979) [1970]. The Book of the Eparch. Variorum Reprints. ISBN 978-0902089006.
- Bury, J. B.; Philotheus (1911). The Imperial Administrative System of the Ninth Century (With a Revised Text of the Kletorologion of Philotheos). London: Oxford University Press.
- Heather, Peter J.; Moncur, David (2001). Politics, Philosophy, and Empire in the Fourth Century: Select Orations of Themistius. Liverpool University Press. ISBN 978-0-85323-106-6.
- Evans, James Allan Stewart (1996). The Age of Justinian: The Circumstances of Imperial Power. Routledge. ISBN 978-0-415-02209-5.
- Kazhdan, Alexander (1991). "Eparch of the City". In Kazhdan, Alexander (ed.). The Oxford Dictionary of Byzantium. Oxford and New York: Oxford University Press. ISBN 0-19-504652-8.
- Kazhdan, Alexander (1991). "Urban Prefect". In Kazhdan, Alexander (ed.). The Oxford Dictionary of Byzantium. Oxford and New York: Oxford University Press. ISBN 0-19-504652-8.
- Lançon, Bertrand (2000-12-13). Rome in Late Antiquity: Everyday Life and Urban Change, AD 312–609. Routledge. p. 228. ISBN 978-0-415-92975-2.
- Ruciński, Sebastian (2009). Praefectus urbi. Le Gardien de l’ordre public à Rome sous le Haut-Empire Romain [Praefectus urbi. The Guardian of Public Order in Rome under the High Roman Empire]. Xenia Posnaniensia, volume 9. Poznań: Wydawnictwo Naukow, ISBN 978-83-602-5131-7.
- Van Tricht, Filip (2011). The Latin Renovatio of Byzantium: The Empire of Constantinople (1204–1228). Leiden: Brill. ISBN 978-90-04-20323-5.
- Wojciech, Katharina (2010). Die Stadtpräfektur im Prinzipat [The urban prefecture in the principate]. Antiquitas, series 1, volume 57. Bonn: Rudolf Habelt, ISBN 978-3-7749-3690-4.
