= Quaestor sacri palatii =

Roman Empire and Byzantium legal office

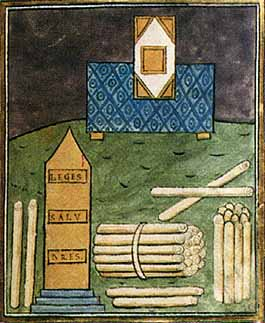
The insignia of the quaestor sacri palatii, from the Notitia Dignitatum: the codicil of office on a stand, surrounded by law scrolls

The quaestor sacri palatii (Greek: κοιαίστωρ/κυαίστωρ τοῦ ἱεροῦ παλατίου, usually simply ὁ κοιαίστωρ/κυαίστωρ; English: Quaestor of the Sacred Palace) was the senior legal authority in the late Roman Empire and early Byzantium, responsible for drafting laws. In the later Byzantine Empire, the office of the quaestor was altered and it became a senior judicial official for the imperial capital, Constantinople. The post survived until the 14th century, albeit only as an honorary title.

== Late Roman quaestor sacri palatii ==
The office was created by Emperor Constantine I (r. 306–337), with the duties of drafting of laws and the answering of petitions addressed to the emperor. Although he functioned as the chief legal advisor of the emperor and hence came to exercise great influence, his actual judicial rights were very limited. Thus from 440 he presided, jointly with the praetorian prefect of the East, over the supreme tribunal in Constantinople which heard appeals (the so-called causae sacrae, since these cases were originally heard by the emperor) from the courts of the diocesan vicarii and the senior provincial governors of spectabilis rank.

According to the Notitia Dignitatum, the quaestor held the rank of vir illustris and did not have a staff (officium) of his own, but was attached a number of aides (adiutores) from the departments of the sacra scrinia. In the mid-6th century, by law their number was fixed at 26 adiutores: twelve from the scrinium memoriae and seven each from the scrinium epistolarum and the scrinium libellorum, although in practice these numbers were often exceeded.

Perhaps the most notable quaestor was Tribonian, who contributed decisively to the codification of Roman law under Emperor Justinian I (r. 527–565). The office continued in Italy even after the dissolution of the Western Roman Empire, as first Odoacer and then the Ostrogothic kings retained the position, which was occupied by members of the Roman senatorial aristocracy like Cassiodorus.

== Byzantine quaestor ==
As part of his reforms, in 539 Emperor Justinian I created another office named quaestor or alternatively quaesitor (Greek: κυαισίτωρ) who was given police and judicial powers in Constantinople, and also tasked with the supervision of new arrivals to the imperial capital. By the turn of the 9th century, the original quaestor had lost most of his former duties to other officials, chiefly the logothetēs tou dromou and the epi tōn deēseōn. The functions of the middle Byzantine quaestor were essentially those of the quaesitor: he was one of the kritai ("judges") of Constantinople. However, as John B. Bury notes, an examination of his subordinate staff, and the fact that it could be held by a eunuch, shows that the later office was the direct continuation of the quaestor sacri palatii.

His duties involved: the supervision of travellers and men from the Byzantine provinces who visited Constantinople; the supervision of beggars; jurisdiction on complaints from tenants against their landlords; the supervision of the capital's magistrates; jurisdiction over cases of forgery. Finally, he had an extensive jurisdiction over wills: wills were sealed with the quaestor's seal, opened in his presence, and their execution supervised by him. The 9th-century quaestor ranked immediately after the logothetēs tou genikou in the lists of precedence (34th in Philotheos's Klētorologion of 899). The post survived into the late Byzantine period, although by the 14th century, nothing had remained of the office save the title, which was conferred as an honorary dignity, ranking 45th in the imperial hierarchy.

=== Subordinate officials ===
Unlike the late Roman official, the middle Byzantine quaestor had an extensive staff:

- The antigrapheis (ἀντιγραφεῖς, "copyists"), the successors of the old magistri scriniorum, the heads of the sacra scrinia under the magister officiorum. The term antigrapheus was used for these officials already in Late Antiquity, and they are explicitly associated with the quaestor in the preparation of legislation in the Ecloga (circa 740). Otherwise, their functions in the quaestor's office are unknown. John B. Bury suggests that the magister memoriae, who inter alia had the task of replying to petitions to the Byzantine emperor, evolved into the epi tōn deēseōn, while the magister libellorum and the magister epistolarum became the (two?) antigrapheis.
- The skribas (σκρίβας), the direct successor of the scriba, a notary attached to the late antique official known as magister census, who was responsible for wills. When the quaestor absorbed the latter office, the skribas came under his control. It is known from legislation that the skribas represented the quaestor in supervising the provisions of wills as regards minors.
- The skeptōr (σκέπτωρ), evidently a corruption of the Latin term exceptor, hence also the direct continuation of the exceptores, a class of officials of the sacra scrinia.
- The libelisios (λιβελίσιος), again deriving from the libellenses of the sacra scrinia.
- A number of kankellarioi (καγκελλάριοι, from Latin cancellarii) under a prōtokankellarios (πρωτοκαγκελλάριος).

== See also ==
- Roman finance

== Sources ==
- Bury, John Bagnell (1911). The Imperial Administrative System of the Ninth Century - With a Revised Text of the Kletorologion of Philotheos. London: Oxford University Press.
- Kazhdan, Alexander, ed. (1991). The Oxford Dictionary of Byzantium. Oxford and New York: Oxford University Press. ISBN 0-19-504652-8.
- Kelly, Christopher (2004). Ruling the Later Roman Empire. Cambridge, Massachusetts: Harvard University Press. ISBN 0-674-01564-9.
