= Lou Merloni =

American baseball player (born 1971)

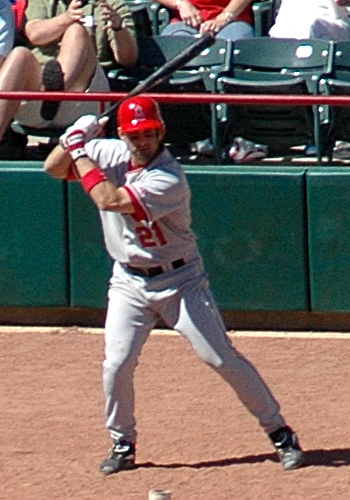
- Merloni with the Los Angeles Angels in 2005
- Infielder
- Born: April 6, 1971 (age 55); Framingham, Massachusetts, U.S.
- Batted: Right Threw: Right

Professional debut
- MLB: May 10, 1998, for the Boston Red Sox
- NPB: April 1, 2000, for the Yokohama BayStars

Last appearance
- NPB: July 20, 2000, for the Yokohama BayStars
- MLB: June 4, 2006, for the Cleveland Indians

MLB statistics
- Batting average: .271
- Home runs: 14
- Runs batted in: 125

NPB statistics
- Batting average: .213
- Home runs: 1
- Runs batted in: 3
- Stats at Baseball Reference

Teams
- Boston Red Sox (1998–1999); Yokohama BayStars (2000); Boston Red Sox (2000–2002); San Diego Padres (2003); Boston Red Sox (2003); Cleveland Indians (2004); Los Angeles Angels of Anaheim (2005); Cleveland Indians (2006)

Louis William Merloni (born April 6, 1971), nicknamed "Sweet Lou", is an American sportscaster who currently serves as the primary color analyst for the Boston Red Sox on the New England Sports Network (NESN). A former Major League Baseball player, Merloni played for his hometown Boston Red Sox from 1998–2002 and again for part of 2003. He also played for the San Diego Padres, Cleveland Indians, and Los Angeles Angels of Anaheim in MLB, as well as Nippon Professional Baseball's Yokohama BayStars.

== Amateur career ==
A native of Framingham, Massachusetts, Merloni graduated from Providence College in 1993 and holds several single-season and career records for the now-defunct Friars baseball team. In 1991, Merloni played collegiate summer baseball for the Bourne Braves of the Cape Cod Baseball League (CCBL), and returned to the league in 1992 to play with the Cotuit Kettleers. He was inducted into the CCBL Hall of Fame in 2010.

== Professional career ==
Merloni hit a home run in his first major-league at bat in Fenway Park, a three-run home run off of José Rosado on May 15, 1998. While with Boston, his frequent reassignments between the Red Sox and their Triple-A affiliate Pawtucket Red Sox caused local sportswriters to coin the term "Merloni Shuttle" to refer to Boston's transfer of players between the clubs. Merloni became popular with Boston fans for his local roots and reliable pinch hitting. Merloni hit .294 for his career as a pinch hitter.

He played part of the 2000 season with Yokohama BayStars of Japan's NPB, before returning to the United States with the Red Sox in July. He remained with the Red Sox through the 2002 season. He was placed on waivers by the Red Sox at the end of Spring Training in 2003, and was claimed by the San Diego Padres. The Padres traded him back to the Red Sox in August 2003.

Merloni would sign with the Cleveland Indians ahead of the 2004 season, a season which would see many of his former teammates in Boston win the Red Sox's first World Series championship in 86 years.

While never an everyday player, Merloni would play just 14 more MLB games following the 2004 season. He signed with the Los Angeles Angels of Anaheim for 2005, but played just five games for the Angels that season as he battled a severe ankle injury that kept him out most of the season. He signed a minor league contract to return to the Indians for the 2006 season. After beginning the 2006 season with the Triple-A Buffalo Bisons, Merloni was called back up to the majors on May 17, 2006. He appeared in nine games for the Indians during that season, which would be the final nine games of his major league career.

Ahead of the 2007 season, Merloni signed a minor league contract with the Oakland Athletics. He spent the season with Oakland's Triple-A affiliate, the Sacramento River Cats. Merloni was chosen as the Most Valuable Player in the 2007 Bricktown Showdown, leading the River Cats over the Richmond Braves by a final score of 7–1. Merloni contributed a home run and four RBI in the game. Before the game, Merloni had been chosen as the River Cats' team captain. He was also voted Best Defensive Player and Best Teammate for the 2007 season.

== Broadcast career ==
Beginning in March 2008, Merloni began appearing on WEEI-AM's Big Show as a co-host. On May 27, 2008, Merloni joined the New England Sports Network (NESN) as a commentator on the Red Sox pre-game and post-game shows. After the 2008 season, Merloni decided not to remain with NESN. Merloni was hired by Comcast SportsNet New England during the 2009 season as an analyst and reporter.

On February 28, 2011, Merloni started co-hosting WEEI's Mut and Merloni show with Mike Mutnansky. On May 27, 2014, Merloni, Tim Benz, and Christian Fauria began the Midday's with MFB show. Fauria previously played for the New England Patriots as a tight end. Benz, a former beat reporter for the Pittsburgh Steelers and radio show host in Pittsburgh, joined the show after Mutnansky was forced out due to poor ratings.

In 2013, Merloni began serving as a part-time color analyst on the Boston Red Sox Radio Network, teaming with play-by-play announcers Joe Castiglione and Dave O'Brien for select games. In October that year, he joined Castiglione and O'Brien for WEEI-FM's broadcasts of the ALCS and World Series. Merloni has maintained a semi-regular presence on Red Sox radio since then.

In September 2015, Glenn Ordway joined Merloni and Fauria at WEEI for the station's mid-day program; the show moved to the afternoon drive time in July 2018. After Ordway retired in August 2021, the show was hosted by Merloni and Fauria; they were joined by Meghan Ottolini in May 2022, making the show Merloni, Fauria, and Mego. In December 2022, it was announced that Merloni would leave the show at the end of the year.

In 2023, Merloni returned to NESN as a color analyst for select Red Sox games.

Merloni was named the primary color analyst by NESN for Red Sox games for the 2025 season.

== Steroid education controversy ==
During an appearance May 9, 2009, on WEEI's The Baseball Show, Merloni claimed that the Red Sox organization had a doctor brief the players during spring training on how to correctly use steroids. Merloni claims the session did not encourage players to use steroids, but rather informed players that there were right and wrong ways to use them. Merloni stated "It was like teaching your teenage daughter about sex education. The organization acknowledged that there were likely players using steroids and basically 'if you're gonna use them, this is how you use them so you don't abuse them'". Merloni could not remember the name of the doctor nor the year in which the briefing took place.

Merloni's claim was quickly refuted by former Red Sox General Manager Dan Duquette who stated "It's ridiculous. It's totally unfounded. ... If there was such a doctor, he wasn't in the employ of the Red Sox. We brought in doctors to educate the players on the major league drug policy at the time, at the recommendation of Major League Baseball".

Former Red Sox player Troy O'Leary was interviewed and stated he didn't remember the incident. "I remember the normal union meetings in spring training where they'd talk about drugs and steroids, and I remember doctors talking negatively about them, but I don't remember ever hearing anything like, 'OK, this is the right way to do steroids.' If that happened, I missed that one."

Merloni's account was confirmed with former major league pitcher John Rocker who previously stated that a doctor hired by the Major League Baseball Players Association told Alex Rodriguez, Iván Rodríguez, Rafael Palmeiro and him how to use steroids after a spring training lecture in 2002.

On May 16, 2009, ESPN baseball analyst Peter Gammons claimed that an unnamed major league player corroborated Merloni's claim. The player, who also could not remember the doctor's name, placed the briefing as occurring during spring training 2001. The player is quoted as having said: "I'm not sure of the name of the doctor; he was someone outside the Boston organization. In no way did I think Boston was trying to push steroids; I think they just wanted to educate us on the subject. But you could tell by the faces on the training staff that they didn't think the doctor would say the things he did".

== Personal life ==
In the offseasons of 1996 and 1997, Merloni served as a substitute gym teacher at Framingham High School.
