= The Big Show (sports radio show) =

Former sports talk radio program hosted by Glenn Ordway

The Big Show is a former sports talk radio program hosted by Glenn Ordway on Boston's WEEI-FM 93.7 FM. Started in August 1995, the show was hosted by Ordway and former Boston Globe columnist Michael Holley. The show ended on March 19, 2013.

== Personalities and frequent guests ==
=== Hosts ===
Glenn Ordway, the former host of the show, performed radio announcing duties with Boston Celtics announcer Johnny Most for 13 years. After Most's retirement, Ordway was paired with former Celtic Jerry Sichting. In June 1995, Ordway was named Program Director of Sports Radio 850 WEEI and created the current format in the afternoon drive slot. Starting February 28, 2011, Michael Holley, former co-host of the Dale & Holley Show on the same station, co-hosted The Big Show with Ordway. On February 13, 2013, it was announced Ordway had been fired. On February 19, 2013, he was replaced by Seattle radio host and Massachusetts native Mike Salk.

=== Frequent guests ===
- Steve Buckley, columnist for The Boston Herald. Buckley filled in as host when Ordway is absent.
- Fred Smerlas, former NFL All-Pro player. Smerlas appeared on "The Big Show" Monday & Friday during the NFL season, as well as regularly during NFL Draft and Training Camp periods.
- Butch Stearns, former sports anchor for WFXT Fox 25 News (Boston). Stearns filled in as host when Ordway is absent.
- Steve DeOssie, former NFL linebacker and analyst for minor league hockey. DeOssie appeared on "The Big Show" Mondays and Fridays during the NFL season. A regular daily fill-in for absent/vacationing co-hosts.
- Steve Burton, WBZ-TV sports anchor and former quarterback at Northwestern University.
- Bill Burt, sports editor of The Lawrence Eagle Tribune
- Rob Bradford, baseball writer and site editor for WEEI.com. Former baseball reporter for The Boston Herald.
- Tom Curran, current football writer for NBC Sports.
- Cedric Maxwell, former NBA Power forward and MVP of the 1981 NBA Finals. A radio color analyst for the Boston Celtics since the mid-1990s, Maxwell was one of the original guests when WEEI introduced The Big Show.
- Brian Daubach, former first baseman of the Boston Red Sox. Made his "Big Show" debut in the summer of 2008.
- Curt Schilling, former MLB pitcher for the Boston Red Sox, Arizona Diamondbacks, Philadelphia Phillies, Houston Astros, and Baltimore Orioles
- Larry Johnson, WEEI personality
- Jack Edwards, NESN Bruins play-by-play announcer
- Kevin Paul Dupont, Boston Globe hockey writer

=== Former co-hosts ===
- Lyndon Byers, former Boston Bruins player (1995–1996)
- Michael Felger, former Boston Herald sportswriter (2001–2005). Afternoon drive co host on Felger & Mazz show on "98.5 The Sports Hub" WBZ-FM
- Gerry Callahan, sports columnist for the Boston Herald (1995–1997). Current host of the Gerry Callahan Podcast.
- Tony Massarotti, former Boston Herald sportswriter (1995–2008) appearances ended with his leaving the Herald for the Boston Globe due to a long-standing ban on Globe staffers appearing on the station. As of 2024, he is the co host of the Felger & Mazz show on "98.5 The Sports Hub" WBZ-FM
- Sean McDonough, sportscaster on WEEI and ESPN.
- Wendi Nix, former sportscaster
- Dick Radatz, former Boston Red Sox pitcher (1999–2003)
- Dan Shaughnessy, Boston Globe sportswriter (1995–1999)
- Dave Shea, Boston Bruins former announcer broadcasting on "98.5 The Sports Hub" WBZ-FM
- Scott Zolak, former NFL quarterback. As of 2024, co-host of the Zolak and Bertrand show on "98.5 The Sports Hub" WBZ-FM

=== Producers ===
- Andy Massaua

=== Guests ===
During the course of sports seasons, the Big Show often has weekly conversations with players, coaches, and executives. Weekly guests include Bill Belichick, Danny Ainge, Peter Gammons, and Vic Carucci.

== Boston Globe feud ==
WEEI has had a long running feud with The Boston Globe that started in 1999 when sportswriter Ron Borges called New York Yankees pitcher Hideki Irabu a "fat jap." Two days later, the Boston Globe' executive sports editor Don Skwar banned Globe sportswriters from appearing on The Big Show. The ban was later extended to WEEI's Dennis and Callahan morning show. WEEI retaliated by banning Globe staffers from appearing on any of its shows. The ban came to an end on August 4, 2009, when Bob Ryan appeared on the show, with Ordway stating that "we have all come to our senses."

== Bill Simmons ==
Bill Simmons, a popular columnist for ESPN The Magazine, has been a longtime critic of The Big Show, claiming that it is obnoxious and lacks sophistication. Ordway has stated that while he disagrees with most of Simmons' opinions, he [Ordway] believes that Simmons is a "great columnist" yet he considers him a coward for only slandering the show in column while saying that he has no problems with the show in person.

== The Whiner Line ==
"The Whiner Line" was a regular feature which consisted of listeners calling in and leaving complaints on a voicemail system, which was played at the end of the show. Complaints covered a wide range of subjects, including sports teams and stars, the hosts, other listeners, celebrities, current events and local politicians. The messages often included impersonations of celebrities and local figures.

There were numerous running jokes on the Whiner Line, many of which were by local comedian Graig Murphy, who performed impersonations which include, Robert Kraft, Terry Francona, Grady Little, Shannon Sharpe, Harry Caray, Deval Patrick and Dave Lewis. Other impersonations included Glenn Ordway, Mikey Adams, Johnny Damon, Carson Kressly, Bob Neumeier, Borat, Roger Clemens, Eddie Andelman, Bill Clinton, Fred Smerlas, Don Imus, Bill Walton, Edna Jacobson, Dale Arnold, the Senior Senator Ted Kennedy, Wilford Brimley and Dick Radatz, as well as a caller who compiled Red Sox and Patriots-themed top-ten lists, a Mary Carillo impersonator which was accompanied by an impersonation of Morgan Freeman bragging he built the Batmobile, a Beavis and Butthead parody, "Dyedadye Guy" a caller whose comments were parody songs based on Simon & Garfunkel's "The Boxer", a caller who simply called Glenn Ordway a "Fat Bastard", a man simply known as the "Accordion Guy" who created parody songs to the sound of an accordion, a caller known as the "Man on the Way Up", who called regularly and was insulted by the hosts, a caller with a Southern accent, a caller with an Irish accent, known as "The Cardinal", and a caller known as "The $5 Guy" who frequently threatened co-host Steve DeOssie with revenge for supposedly stealing $5 from him (The $5 Guy) in the late 1970s. Former WEEI-FM co-host and Boston Herald sports columnist Michael Felger has been a target of jokes on the Whiner Line.

The Big Show hosted an annual event known as "The Whiny Awards", a tribute to the best "Whiner Line" callers of the year.
