= Kirk Minihane =

American radio host and podcaster

Kirk Seamus Minihane (born October 31, 1974) is an American radio host and podcaster. He currently co-hosts The Unnamed Show, and formerly hosted the Barstool Sports podcast The Kirk Minihane Show, before ending the show in November 2025.

== Early life ==
Minihane is the son of the late Peter J. Minihane and Patricia Doucet. His mother was from Nova Scotia, Canada.

== Career ==
Minihane joined WEEI.com as a sports columnist in 2009. In February 2013, he joined the Dennis and Callahan WEEI-FM morning radio show as the third host alongside John Dennis and Gerry Callahan. In August 2016, the show was renamed Kirk and Callahan after Dennis left WEEI.

In September 2018, Minihane took an indefinite leave of absence from Kirk and Callahan because of mental-health issues. In November 2018, he left Kirk and Calahan to start his own show on WEEI's parent company, Radio.com. The show never materialized, and Minihane left the company in May 2019. Later that month, he joined Barstool Sports. At Barstool, he hosts The Kirk Minihane Show podcast, the Case podcast, and The Unnamed Show with Dave Portnoy and Ryan Whitney.

== Controversies ==
In July 2014, Minihane called reporter Erin Andrews a "gutless bitch" and said that she should "drop dead" for her interview of Adam Wainwright after the 2014 Major League Baseball All-Star Game. He was originally not disciplined for the comments after issuing an apology, but he was later suspended for a week after further criticism of Andrews.

In June 2015, Minihane was suspended after an on-air shouting match with Christian Fauria.

== Personal life ==
Minihane has been open about his struggles with mental health. In August 2018, he was admitted to a hospital after having suicidal thoughts.
