= Ron Borges =

American sportswriter

Ron Borges is an American sportswriter for the Talk of Fame Network. He has previously written for The Boston Globe, the Boston Herald and was a regular guest on The Mike Felger Show, which aired on 890 ESPN radio until July 2008. Borges also was a regular contributor to the HBO.com's Boxing website until 2008. Borges also writes for The Sweet Science, a boxing website.

== Awards ==
Borges has been named Massachusetts Sportswriter of the Year by the National Association of Sportswriters and Sports Broadcasters five times since 1999. He also holds the record for most first prizes and overall awards in the annual competition of the Professional Boxing Writers Association. He has also been awarded a half dozen writing awards in the Associated Press Sports Editors' annual competition and his work has been included in the annual anthology "Best Sports Stories" eight times. He has been awarded either a first or second prize 20 times in writing competitions held by the Professional Football Writers Association as well, including multiple awards in the same year three times. In 1995, he was the recipient of the Nat Fleischer Award for boxing journalism from the Boxing Writers Association of America. He is one of less than 25 boxing writers to ever receive that honor.

== Criticism ==
Borges' hostile opinions have frequently earned him criticism. He has severely criticized Bill Belichick; some media figures, including Bill Simmons, have asserted that this is because Borges relied on former quarterback Drew Bledsoe, benched and traded by Belichick, as his primary source of Patriots information. Borges also wrote a controversial column asserting that Lance Armstrong is not an athlete.

In person, most people have been very kind to me, A few people haven't, usually when they're under the influence of some stimulants or depressants. It's not nice. I don't like it. It happened to me once in a mall with my daughter when she was about 10 years old. Some guy was cursing and yelling. I tried to use it as a learning experience for her on how not to behave. I'd be lying if I said I thought it was cool. But I accept it. I'm not complaining. I know what this is.

Ron Borges also played a part in starting the long running feud between the Boston Globe and Boston sports talk radio station WEEI. In 1999, the Boston Globe's executive sports editor banned Globe sportswriters from appearing on WEEI's afternoon The Big Show after Borges appeared on it and allegedly used a racial slur to describe New York Yankees pitcher Hideki Irabu. Glenn Ordway, host of the show defended Borges stating that he was only trying to 'recall Yankees owner George Steinbrenner's infamous description of Irabu as a "fat, pussy toad." Ordway claims he corrected Borges on the air and was surprised when the ban was announced. Two weeks later, Skwar banned Globe sportswriters from appearing on WEEI's morning Dennis and Callahan Show because of its perceived lowbrow humor. After this ban, WEEI retaliated by banning Globe sportswriters from all WEEI programs.

=== Altercation with Michael Katz ===
In June 2004, Borges was involved in a physical altercation with New York Times and MaxBoxing.com reporter Michael Katz at a press conference in Las Vegas. Reports state that Katz was in the process of interviewing boxing promoter Bob Arum when Borges interrupted to ask Arum a question. Katz objected to the interruption and allegedly accused Borges of "being a shill for" boxing promoter Don King. In a column earlier in the year Katz had called Borges "a vomit-smelling sleaze" and criticized Borges for "writing about a fight without revealing he was being paid by King to provide television commentary". Borges responded by striking Katz, who responded by striking at Borges with his cane. Katz was described as "a short, fat man in his 60s who walks with a cane and wears a neck brace because of chronic back problems". The fight between the two was broken up by Arum and his aide.

=== Plagiarism allegations ===
On March 4, 2007, Borges was caught in plagiarism allegations after an online reader on ESPN.com's New England Patriots message board revealed that there were extensive similarities between a March 4 article by Borges in the Boston Globe and a February 25 article written by sportswriter Mike Sando of the Tacoma News Tribune. On March 5, Borges was suspended for plagiarism by the Globe, without pay, and barred from broadcast appearances for two months. In February 2017, Borges was again accused of plagiarism by Pro FootBall Talk's managing editor, Michael David Smith

=== 2018 suspension ===
On February 9, 2018, the Herald suspended Borges after Borges wrote a story, based on a source who falsely claimed to be Don Yee, the agent of New England Patriots quarterback Tom Brady. The story claimed that if Brady did not receive a contract similar to the one just signed by his former backup, San Francisco 49ers quarterback Jimmy Garoppolo, he would sit out of organized team activities in the spring. The article, which appeared in the print version of the Herald, was deleted from the Herald's website. The Herald issued an apology to Yee, Brady, and the Patriots, and stated Borges' column was "suspended pending further review."

== Transition to The Boston Herald ==
On May 18, 2007, less than two weeks after returning from his 2-month suspension for plagiarism, Borges announced his retirement from the Globe. In October 2008, Borges resumed his role as a Boston sportswriter, this time with the Boston Herald. Borges was laid off not long after he was suspended in 2018 as part of widespread layoffs undertaken by the Herald's new owners, DigitalFirst
