= Logothetes tou praitoriou =

The logothetēs tou praitōriou (Greek: λογοθέτης τοῦ πραιτωρίου) was a senior official, one of the two principal aides (together with the symponos) of the Eparch of Constantinople, the capital of the Byzantine Empire. Literary and sigillographic evidence attests to the existence of this office from the late 7th or early 8th century up to the 11th century. His exact role is unclear, but, since the praitōrion was one of the capital's chief prisons, his functions were probably judicial and police-related.

== Sources ==
- Bury, J. B. (1911). The Imperial Administrative System of the Ninth Century – With a Revised Text of the Kletorologion of Philotheos. London: Oxford University Press. OCLC 1046639111.
- Kazhdan, A. (1991). "Logothetes tou praitoriou". In Kazhdan, Alexander (ed.). The Oxford Dictionary of Byzantium. Oxford and New York: Oxford University Press. p. 1248. ISBN 0-19-504652-8.
