= Parathalassites =

The parathalassitēs (Greek: παραθαλασσίτης, "the one by the sea") was a Byzantine judicial and administrative office which, as its name implies, exercised control over maritime traffic and the imports and tolls on goods conveyed thereby.

Although there were several parathalassitai in the Byzantine provinces, the most important holder of the office was the parathalassitēs of Constantinople, the imperial capital. The origins of the office are obscure: an anonymous chronicle attributes its creation to Emperor Justinian I (r. 527–565). He may be regarded as the rough equivalent of the comes riparum ("count of the river") and comes portus ("count of the port") of Old Rome. Like him, he was a subordinate official of the urban prefect, also known as the Eparch of Constantinople; in Philotheos's Klētorologion of 899, he is indeed shown as being of relatively lowly rank. The office, however, evidently rose in importance later, during the 11th and 12th centuries, as attested by the senior dignities (up to prōtoproedros and kouropalatēs) in surviving seals of holders of the office. It is possible, as surmised by Helene Ahrweiler, that at about the same time the office was removed from the urban prefect's purview and made an independent government department, putting the parathalassitēs on the same footing as the urban prefect and the logothetēs tou genikou. In the 12th century, multiple holders of the office are attested at the same time. It is not known when the office was abolished, but it does not appear in sources from the 13th century onwards.

== Sources ==
- Bury, J. B.; Philotheus (1911). The Imperial Administrative System of the Ninth Century (With a Revised Text of the Kletorologion of Philotheos). London: Oxford University Press.
- Kazhdan, A. (1991). "Parathalassites". In Kazhdan, Alexander (ed.). The Oxford Dictionary of Byzantium. Oxford and New York: Oxford University Press. pp. 1586–1587. ISBN 0-19-504652-8.
- Laiou, Angeliki E., ed. (2002). The Economic History of Byzantium from the Seventh through the Fifteenth Century. Washington, DC: Dumbarton Oaks. ISBN 0-88402-288-9. Archived from the original on 2012-02-18.
