= Charlie Moore (television personality) =

American television host (born 1970)

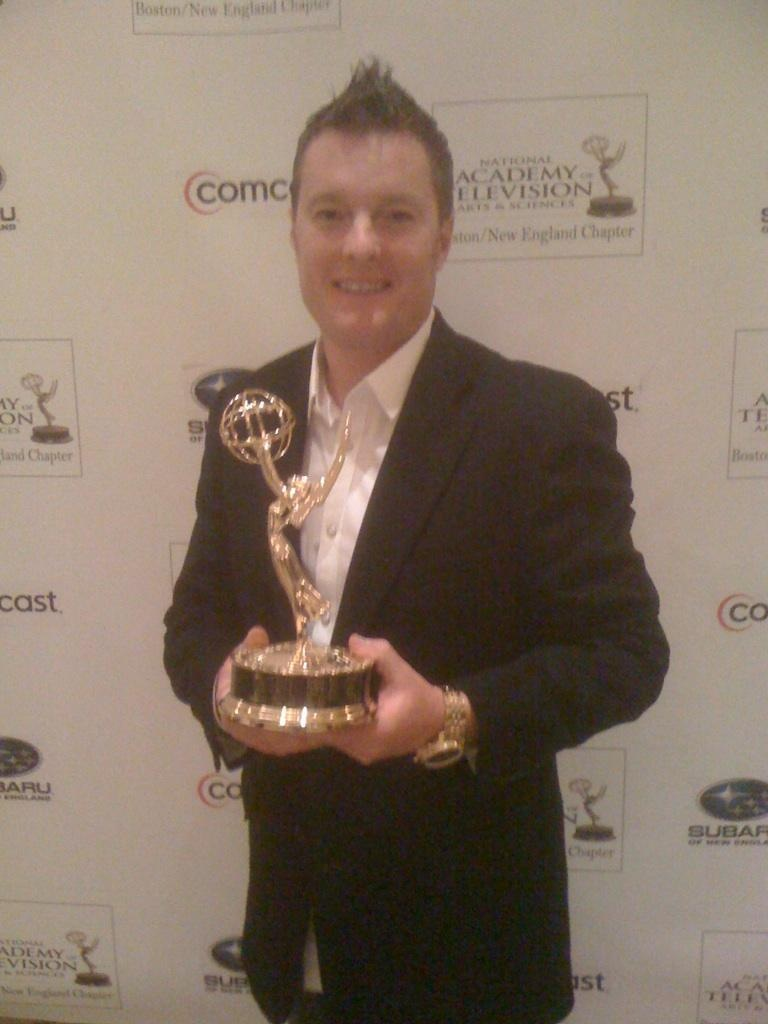
- Moore at the 2011 New England Emmy Awards
- Born: November 7, 1970 (age 55); Wakefield, Massachusetts, U.S.
- Occupation: Television Host
- Years active: 1996–present
- Spouse: Angela Moore (married 1991)
- Children: Anthony Moore, Nikolas Moore, Kaitlin Moore
- Website: www.charliemore.com

Charlie Moore (born November 7, 1970, in Wakefield, Massachusetts), sometimes known as Charlie Moore the Mad Fisherman, is an American television sports personality. He is host of Charlie Moore: No Offense airing in national and worldwide syndication and available throughout the world on Google Play, Apple TV, Roku and the Charlie Moore: No Offense app, on Apple and Android devices. and Charlie Moore Outdoors on the New England Sports Network (NESN).

From 2004 to 2010, Moore hosted ESPN's Beat Charlie Moore, which was the sports network's top-rated outdoors show.

Moore is known for having a high-energy and humorous hosting style. The Orlando Sentinel wrote, "Moore, the brash, fast-talking Boston native, suddenly has become one of the country's most recognizable outdoorsmen."

Moore is the recipient of nineteen New England Emmy Awards for his work on Charlie Moore Outdoors, Behind the B, Bruins Academy and New England Traveler. He is a member of the New England Sports Hall of Fame.

In 2007, Moore was one of three celebrity sportsman anglers (along with former Boston Red Sox great Ted Williams and sports broadcaster Curt Gowdy) featured in the Sports Museum of New England's exhibition "Gone Fishing: The Boston Sportsman."

In 2007, in honor of Moore, New England's Brigham's Ice Cream introduced a new flavor, "Mad Fish Mud", with proceeds benefiting HIV/AIDS programs at Children's Hospital Boston.

Moore's memoir, The Mad Fisherman, was published in 2008 by St. Martin's Press. The book chronicle's Moore's path from unemployment and near-poverty to celebrated host of two top-rated sports television programs. Kirkus Reviews wrote, "Moore's madcap vibrancy and zest for outdoor life permeate this unpretentious chronicle."

Moore has starred in several Alzheimer's PSAs to help raise money to fight the disease. (MadToEndAlz.org) Moore lost his mother Helen to Alzheimer's disease February 9, 2020.

In July 2021, Moore was featured on the cover of New Hampshire in an article where Charlie invited the magazine along on a TV shoot. The magazine article and behind-the-scenes antics later became the subject of an episode of Charlie Moore Outdoors on NESN and Charlie Moore No Offense in worldwide syndication.

== Career ==
=== Charlie Moore: No Offense ===
Charlie Moore: No Offense is a weekly, half-hour outdoor reality TV series airing in national and worldwide syndication that follows host Charlie Moore as he conducts celebrity interviews while fishing in various locations throughout the United States. His guests, from sports, entertainment, and politics, have included presidential candidate Mitt Romney, Boston Red Sox catcher Jason Varitek, Boston Bruins goalie Tuukka Rask, former New England Patriots offensive lineman Todd Rucci, NHL Hall of Famer Ray Bourque, Bobby Orr, and musicians from the rock group Lynyrd Skynyrd and the rap group RunDMC.The show debuted in January 2011 and airs throughout the world on Google Play, Apple TV, Roku and the Charlie Moore: No Offense app, available on Apple and Android devices.

=== Charlie Moore Outdoors ===
Charlie Moore Outdoors is a Emmy award winning, half-hour reality television sports program that airs several times a week on the New England Sports Network. The show, which premiered in 2000, combines celebrity guests, skits, fishing, travel and Charlie Moore's second favorite pastime, cooking. Guests have included NHL hall-of-famer Bobby Orr, former Boston Red Sox pitcher Bill Lee, New England Patriots quarterback Tom Brady, musician Ted Nugent and Batman TV actor Adam West.

=== Behind the B ===
Charlie Moore is Executive Producer of the Emmy award winning TV series Behind the B, the Boston Bruins 24/7 behind the scenes show that brings viewers into the locker room, the executive board room and player's homes. The show debuted in 2012. Behind the B presents an inside look at the inner workings of the organization throughout the duration of the current season. The series airs on NESN, NESN +, NESN National and the NHL Network (American TV channel) and is voiceover narrated by Denis Leary. Behind the B is also created and produced by Charlie Moore's production company Mad Fish Productions.

=== Bruins Academy ===
Charlie Moore was asked to host and create a new TV series for the Boston Bruins. Bruins Academy is an Emmy Award winning show all about knowing, growing and loving the sport of hockey. The show is produced by Charlie Moore's production company Mad Fish Productions in partnership with the Boston Bruins and airs on NESN, NESN+, NESN National and the NHL Network (American TV channel). Bruins Academy debuted in December 2016.

=== New England Traveler ===
New England Traveler is a Emmy award winning TV series that was created by Charlie Moore's longtime childhood friend Greg Boghosian. Boghosian teamed up with Moore's production company Mad Fish Productions. Charlie Moore is Executive Producer and Showrunner for New England Traveler. The show which debuted in 2014 is Hosted and Executive Produced by seven-time New England Emmy Award winning Greg Boghosian and airs on NESN, NESN + and NESN National.

=== Travel Moore with Anthony Moore ===
On December 24, 2022, Mad Fish Productions debuted a new TV series on NESN hosted by five-time Emmy winner, Anthony Moore, Travel Moore with Anthony Moore. Anthony travels throughout the country to find the best food, fun and adventures. The premiere episode, Beefie Boys opened up to great ratings on NESN during the annual Charlie Moore Christmas Marathon over Christmas Eve and Christmas Day, and in April 2023 that same first episode was nominated for a New England Emmy Award in the Lifestyle category.

=== Birdball ===
Charlie Moore is Executive Producer, Showrunner and also the narrating voice of Birdball, a TV series that aired on NESN, NESN + and NESN National featuring Mike Gambino, Head Coach of the Boston College Eagles baseball team. Mad Fish Productions TV crew followed the entire team around for the whole 2023 season, giving viewers a behind-the-scenes look into Birdball.

=== Beat Charlie Moore ===
In 2004, Moore began work on the show Beat Charlie Moore. The show aired for 8 seasons on ESPN from 2004 until 2010, totaling 96 episodes. It was one of the highest rated shows on ESPN 2 and the first show on ESPN to have the host's name in the title of the series. The show was very high energy and ESPN considered it the future of outdoor programming. Beat Charlie Moore was edited and produced by Doug Orr.

=== Roughing It ===
In 2004–2005, Moore hosted NESN's first original TV series, Roughing It. The show consisted of taking two athletes and two comedians into the woods of New England for an outdoor adventure. The show was a success, however, Moore had to bow out of the project after two seasons because his schedule did not allow him to host three TV series at the same time.

=== Charlie Moore – "Mad Fish" the sitcom ===
In 2008 Moore was signed by CAA Creative Artists Agency in Los Angeles. Moore ended up signing a sitcom deal with Paramount Pictures. He worked on the project but it was derailed by the Writers Guild of America writer's strike, however, after the strike the project was resurrected. Moore had decided to work on other projects so the sitcom was shelved.

=== Charlie Moore TV ===
In 2006 Moore produced and hosted the Charlie Moore TV series for WFN, the World Fishing Network. The project was the first original series on the WFN network. The series ended after two seasons.

=== Front Row ===
In the fall of 1995, Front Row, a nightly magazine program premiered on NESN. In the spring of 1996, Moore made his television debut hosting Front Row Outdoors. The features were about two minutes in length and originally aired bi-weekly, however, due to the success of the features NESN began running them every week. For his first season on TV Moore made 50 dollars an episode, earning a grand total of 500 dollars for ten episodes. Front Row was canceled in 2000 and Moore was offered his own TV series Charlie Moore Outdoors.

=== Other projects ===
Moore created his own line of seasonings in 2012. The spices include 11 different flavors. Moore's favorite blend is Lemon Pepper. The spices are available on his website.

Moore teamed up with American Tackle Company, located in central Florida. Together they created a Charlie Moore Mad Fisherman line of rods and reels. The name of the rods is Mad Fish Stixx.

In 2004, Moore began work on the show Beat Charlie Moore. The show aired for 8 seasons on ESPN from 2004 until 2010. In 2004–2005, Moore worked on a show called Roughing It for the NESN Network, which aired for one season. He also presented the show Charlie Moore TV, which aired for 2 seasons on the WFN Network. Moore also worked on a sitcom in 2008 for the Fox Network.

== Personal life ==
Moore is from Lynnfield, Massachusetts. He attended Beverly High School for two years and is a graduate of Lynnfield High School. Moore met his wife at a CVS Pharmacy in Beverly, Massachusetts in 1988; they married September 1, 1991.

Moore lives in southern New Hampshire with his wife. The couple have three children and four grandchildren.

Charlie's wife has made several appearances in Charlie Moore No Offense and Charlie Moore Outdoors. Moore also splits his time between New England and his vacation home in Windermere, Florida. Moore is a car enthusiast who owns several exotic sports cars.
