= Symponos =

The symponos (Greek: σύμπονος) was, along with the logothetes tou praitoriou, one of the two senior subalterns to the Eparch of Constantinople, the chief administrator of the capital of the Byzantine Empire. His main responsibility was the supervision of the city's guilds on the Eparch's behalf. Earlier scholars suggested that each guild had its own symponos, but this hypothesis has been rejected since. John B. Bury identified him as the successor of the adsessor attested in the late 4th century Notitia Dignitatum, but the earliest surviving seal of a symponos dates to the 6th or 7th centuries. The office is last attested in 1023. According to the Taktikon Uspensky, the symponos and the logothetes tou praitoriou preceded, rank-wise, the chartoularioi of the Byzantine themes and domesticates, but were beneath the rank of spatharios.

== Sources ==
- Bury, J. B. (1911). The Imperial Administrative System of the Ninth Century – With a Revised Text of the Kletorologion of Philotheos. London: Oxford University Press. OCLC 1046639111.
- Kazhdan, Alexander, ed. (1991). The Oxford Dictionary of Byzantium. Oxford and New York: Oxford University Press. ISBN 0-19-504652-8.
- Laiou, Angeliki E., ed. (2007) [2002]. The Economic History of Byzantium: From the Seventh through the Fifteenth Century. Washington, District of Columbia: Dumbarton Oaks. ISBN 978-0-88402-332-6.
- Sinnigen, William Gurnee (1957). The Officium of the Urban Prefecture during the Later Roman Empire. Rome: American Academy in Rome.
