= Steve Burton (sports journalist) =

American sports journalist

Steve Burton is the Sports Director for WBZ-TV and WSBK-TV in Boston. The son of former Boston Patriots player Ron Burton, Steve Burton grew up in Framingham, Massachusetts and is a graduate of and a former quarterback for Northwestern University holding a bachelor of science degree in Communications and a master's degree in Broadcast journalism. He lives in the Boston area with his wife Virginia and four children.

== Career ==
Starting in 1993, Burton worked as a sports anchor and reporter for New England Sports Network (NESN), hosting the pre and post game shows for the Boston Red Sox.

In 1994, Burton joined WBZ-TV, where he now is sports director and main anchor. He also anchors the weekly programs Sports Final, Patriots Game Day, All Access, and the Patriots 5th Quarter show.

Burton is also a frequent guest on WEEI's The Big Show certain times of the year. Nicknamed "vest" for his sharp dress, Burton is occasionally criticized for showing up late on the radio and is also ribbed for his appetite, as he ate nine large slices of pizza on the air during a 2009 broadcast.

Burton became WBZ's sports director following Bob Lobel's firing in early April 2008.

== Family ==
All three of his daughters are former NCAA Division I basketball players: Kendall for Villanova University; Kayla for Lehigh University; and Veronica for Northwestern University. Veronica is also a current WNBA player for the Golden State Valkyries. His son Austin was a former quarterback for both the UCLA Bruins and the Purdue Boilermakers. Kayla has also worked as a host for NBC Sports Boston since July 2024.

== Community service ==
Burton spends time working at the Ron Burton Training Village, a 5-week sports camp for inner city youths. That organization awarded him the MIAA/Ron Burton Community Service Award in 2003. He also serves as a board member on several children's charities including the Doug Flutie, Jr. Foundation for Autism and the Fellowship of Christian Athletes.
