= Glenn Ordway =

American sports radio personality (born 1951)

- Born: January 16, 1951 (age 75)
- Education: American Academy of Dramatic Arts
- Occupations: Radio host, sports broadcaster
- Years active: 1972–2021
- Known for: Boston sports radio, Boston Celtics broadcasts
- Notable work: The Big Show on WEEI
- Children: 5

Glenn Ordway (born January 16, 1951) is an American former sports radio and television personality based in the Boston area. He also spent over a decade as a radio sports commentator for Boston Celtics games.

== Career ==
Ordway began his radio career in 1972 at WMLO, a small station in Beverly, Massachusetts. He then went to WMEX/WITS in Boston in 1975, where at times he filled in for Steve Fredericks; he subsequently became sports director as well as working on Boston Bruins broadcasts. In 1981, Ordway gained prominence at WRKO in Boston where he hosted a popular, award-winning call-in show, Sportscall.

Ordway spent 13 years as a member of the Boston Celtics' radio broadcast team. After seven years as the number-two announcer alongside longtime Celtics play-by-play man Johnny Most, Ordway took over as the Celtics' primary announcer in 1989, a post he held until 1996. During this period, he appeared as himself in an episode of the long-running Boston-based sitcom Cheers.

=== WEEI ===
In 1987, the Celtics moved their radio programming to WEEI (then 590 AM), where Ordway became executive sports director, and later program manager. The broadcasts moved to 850 AM in 1994 under the same WEEI call letters. In 1996, Ordway was promoted to program director, and began The Big Show.

Ordway also hosted a program during New England Patriots season called New England Tailgate, discussing the team with former players Fred Smerlas and Steve DeOssie. He also appeared on the HBO sports documentaries The Curse of the Bambino and The Reverse of the Curse of the Bambino.

In December 2006, the Patriots revoked season tickets purchased by Smerlas. Smerlas had been in a partnership with Ordway in a company hosting tailgate parties at Patriot games, charging customers more than the face value of game tickets. The Patriots determined that the service violated its policy prohibiting season ticket holders from reselling their tickets above face value. Both Ordway and Smerlas denied that money was made on the resale of tickets.

Ordway announced on his December 11, 2008, show that he would be going on vacation for the rest of the month as his contract with Entercom Communications (owner of WEEI) was set to expire on December 31, and that he was not sure if he would be returning to the air after his vacation. Ordway's contract negotiations may have been affected by Entercom financial problems—the company risked being delisted by the New York Stock Exchange because its stock price had dipped below a dollar.

In January 2009, it was announced that Ordway and Entercom had an agreement on a five-year contract that would pay Ordway $1 million per year.

In September 2011, it was reported that Ordway's salary had been cut in half due to lower ratings, per his contract. That month, WEEI began to simulcast its sports radio programming on FM, with the FM station adopting WEEI-FM call letters on September 21.

=== 2013 firing ===
On February 12, 2013, Ordway was let go from WEEI. He was replaced on the afternoon show by Mike Salk, a Boston native previously doing sports radio in Seattle.

In November 2013, Ordway was announced as the host for The Big Weekend Show with Glenn Ordway to air on SiriusXM's Mad Dog Sports Radio; at that time, he also hinted at a possible 2014 return to Boston.

On March 17, 2014, Ordward launched The Big Show Unfiltered on SportstalkBoston.com. Ordway broadcast on ESPN New Hampshire Radio Nashua/Manchester from June 2014 until May 2015.

=== WEEI return and retirement ===
In September 2015, Ordway returned to WEEI, joining Lou Merloni (a former Boston Red Sox player) and Christian Fauria (a former New England Patriots player) for the station's mid-day program (commonly known as OMF per the first letters of their last names); the show moved to the afternoon drive time in July 2018. Ordway remained with the show until his retirement.

In June 2021, Ordway announced he would retire from WEEI-FM in August, but would continue to host Patriots postgame shows and would work on special projects with the station.

== Personal life ==
Ordway grew up in Lynn, Massachusetts, and graduated from Lynn Classical High School in 1968. After attending Boston University for a year, he graduated in 1972 from the American Academy of Dramatic Arts in New York City. Intending to be an actor, he had a walk-on role in the 1970 movie The Out-of-Towners and appeared in at least one off-Broadway play. He later took a broadcasting course at New York University.

On March 3, 2008, Ordway called into The Big Show to explain that his wife had just given birth to a baby girl and both mother and daughter had suffered severe complications during delivery.

Ordway has two children with his wife, Sarah. He also has three children from a previous marriage.

== Awards and recognition ==
- In 1990, UPI bestowed the Celtics' broadcasting team of Most and Ordway a first-place finish for pre-game show as well as for play-by-play.
- In 2005, Ordway was nominated for a Marconi Award, given for excellence in radio, for "Major Market Personality of the Year".
- In 2005, Ordway was awarded the annual Jimmy Award by The Jimmy Fund. The award honors "individuals who have, over the years, committed themselves to the mission of Dana-Farber and the Jimmy Fund."
- In 2008, Ordway placed 91st on the trade journal Talkers Magazine list of the "Heavy Hundred". The list ranks what the magazine considers the most popular, influential, or entertaining talk-show hosts from around the country. As of 2009, Ordway had moved up to 87th.
