= John Dennis (talk show host) =

American broadcaster

John Adron Dennis is an American former broadcaster best known as the co-host of WEEI-FM sports radio's former Dennis and Callahan morning show.

== Biography ==
Dennis is a 1974 graduate of Kent State University. At age 22, Dennis served as sports director and weekday anchor for WDAF-TV, an NBC affiliate in Kansas City, Missouri. He later became a studio anchorman at WPSL radio. In 1977, he joined WNAC-TV Channel 7 (later WNEV and now WHDH-TV) in Boston. Over the next 21 years, he covered the Boston sports scene for the station, holding the following roles: weekend and weekday sports anchor, sports producer, and sports director, as well as producing several sports features and investigative reports.

Dennis is involved with several Boston-based charities, raising money for the Jimmy Fund, the Cystic Fibrosis Foundation and he is on the board of directors for the Mutual Funds Against Cancer Organization.

In April 2015, Dennis entered an inpatient rehab facility to receive treatment for alcohol abuse. On August 18, 2016, Entercom announced that Dennis, under a doctor's advice to reduce his workload, would immediately leave the morning show but would still be at the station for fill-ins, relations with advertisers, and special events. Since his demotion, Dennis has sold his house in Florida and performs odd jobs in his spare time.

Over his career, Dennis has made cameos in many of the Farrelly brothers' films. He maintained an active Twitter presence as a supporter of Donald Trump and right-wing politics.

== Controversies ==
=== Boston Globe ban ===
In 1999, the Boston Globe's executive sports editor, Don Skwar, banned its sportswriters from the Globe from appearing on the Dennis & Callahan morning show because of its perceived lowbrow humor. This came two weeks after he banned Globe sportswriters from appearing on WEEI's afternoon The Big Show after columnist Ron Borges appeared on the show and used a racial slur to describe New York Yankees pitcher Hideki Irabu. After the ban, WEEI retaliated by banning Globe sportswriters from all WEEI programs.

=== METCO controversy ===
On September 29, 2003, during a segment called 'headlines', where they read and comment about current news stories, Dennis and his morning co-host Gerry Callahan made racially insensitive remarks while discussing a story about an escaped gorilla. The gorilla had escaped from the Franklin Park Zoo and had been recaptured at a bus stop. Their on the air banter included these lines:

Callahan: "They caught him at a bus stop, right -- he was like waiting to catch a bus out of town."

Dennis: "Yeah, yeah -- he's a METCO gorilla." Callahan: "Heading out to Lexington."

Dennis: "Exactly."

METCO is a state program that buses inner-city Boston students to nearby suburban schools. Many perceived the comments to be comparing poor, mostly African-American children to gorillas.

WEEI general manager Tom Baker suspended both hosts for two days, then extended the suspension to two weeks after the Blue Cross-Blue Shield (Blue Cross Blue Shield of Massachusetts) pulled $27,000 in ads and in turn donated that money to METCO. Dunkin' Donuts responded by ceasing all advertising that involved the voices of John Dennis or Gerry Callahan. Both hosts apologized, though in a way many thought was sarcastic and insincere, and were sent to sensitivity training. WEEI also agreed to provide free advertising for the METCO program on the radio station. In November 2003, WEEI General Manager Tom Baker was replaced by Julie Kahn. Station executives denied there was a connection between the METCO incident and Baker's replacement.

=== Ryen Russillo voicemail ===
Dennis had a personal conflict with Ryen Russillo, who at the time was a New England Patriot commentator at WBCN, during which he left Russillo a voicemail following a conversation between Dennis's daughter and Russillo at a local Boston bar. Subsequently, Russillo lost that job. Russillo subsequently worked for ESPN, which is heard in part on WEEI. The Russillo-Dennis feud continued in February 2012 when they encountered each other at an ESPN Super Bowl Party.

== Awards and recognition ==
- 1978 Nominated for Regional Emmy for his feature, "Cowboys, Creole and Orange Crush."
- 1978 & 1981 Regional Emmy for specialized reporting.
- 1983 & 1984 Associated Press (AP) Best Sports Coverage award.
- 1983, 1984 & 1985 National Association of Television Arts and Sciences (NATAS) Boston/New England Chapter Emmy award for "Best Sports Coverage within a Newscast.
- 1983, 1984 & 1985 UPI Best Sports Coverage awards.
- 1986 As part of the WHDH-TV sports team, was awarded the United Press International (UPI) National Broadcast Award in the "Division One Sports Reporting" category.
- 1987 Emmy Award for "Outstanding Sports Program within a Newscast."
