= Sensitivity training =

- MeSH: D012681

Sensitivity training is a form of training with the goal of making people more aware of their own goals as well as their prejudices, and more sensitive to others and to the dynamics of group interaction.

== Origins ==
Kurt Lewin laid the foundations for sensitivity training in a series of workshops he organised in 1946, using his field theory as the conceptual background. His work then contributed to the founding of the National Training Laboratories in Bethel, Maine in 1947 – now part of the National Education Association – and to their development of training groups or T-groups.

Meanwhile, others had been influenced by the wartime need to help soldiers deal with traumatic stress disorders (then known as shell shock) to develop group therapy as a treatment technique. Carl Rogers in the fifties worked with what he called "small face-to-face groups – groups exhibiting industrial tensions, religious tensions, racial tensions, and therapy groups in which many personal tensions were present". Along with others drawing on the ideas of the Human Potential Movement, he extended the group idea to broad population of 'normals' seeking personal growth, which he called encounter groups, after the existential tradition of an authentic encounter between people.

Other leaders in the development of encounter groups, including Will Schutz, worked at the Esalen Institute in Big Sur, California. Schutz himself stressed how "the terms 'T-group' (T for training) and 'sensitivity training group' are commonly used...synonymously with 'encounter group'".

== Focus and legacy ==
The focus of the sensitivity training group was on here-and-now interactions among the group members, and on their group experience; and worked by following the energy of the emerging issues in the group, and dramatising them in verbal or non-verbal ways. An atmosphere of openness and honesty was encouraged throughout; and authenticity and self-actualization were prominent goals.

The heyday of the encounter groups were the sixties and seventies; thereafter nonverbal interaction was increasingly discouraged, in favour of a more modest emphasis upon following group processes as they emerged. The techniques of T-Groups and Encounter Groups have merged and divided and splintered into more specialized topics, arguably seeking to promote sensitivity to others perceived as different, and seemingly losing some of their original focus on self-exploration as a means to understanding and improving relations with others in a more general sense.

=== Research ===
Another legacy of sensitivity training, prompted in part by controversy, has been a new rigour in research methods for the study of group work, and of its outcomes.

== In media ==
21stC sensitivity training was mocked on TV in 2008 by the program Penn & Teller: Bullshit!

== Criticisms ==
Criticisms of modern sensitivity training have repeatedly surfaced over the decades.

- Therapists early expressed reservations about the encounter group both from within and without the movement. Thus Carl Rogers expressed concerns about its potential to license intrusive, bullying behaviour, concluding that members needed a solid ego to profit from it. Eric Berne similarly pointed to the danger of the group only providing a series of unassimilated insights functioning as insults, quipping that "One definition of a sensitivity group is that it is a place where sensitive people go to have their feelings hurt".
- Right-wing critic and conspiracy theorist G. Edward Griffin, faced with the movement's more radical claims to promote social change, argued that sensitivity training involves the unethical use of psychological techniques with groups that come close to brainwashing.
- Research analysis of the results of encounter groups revealed significant effects for both good and bad: where some 30% of participants found lasting benefit, 8% experienced equally lasting negative results.

== See also ==
- Attack therapy
- Diversity training
- Eric Trist
- Gregory Bateson
- Groupthink
- J.L. Moreno
- John Rawlings Rees
- Quaesitor
- Synergy
- William Sargant
