= Lyndon Byers =

Canadian ice hockey player (1964–2025)

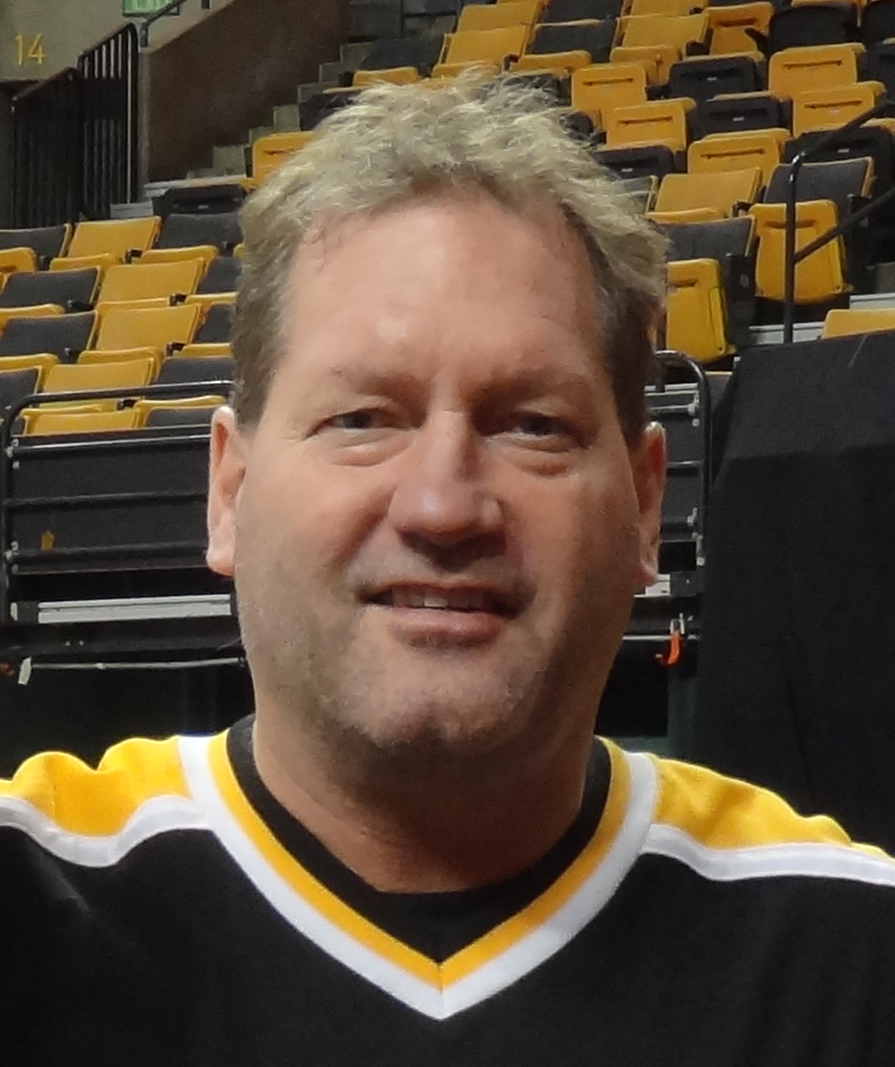
- Byers in 2013
- Born: February 29, 1964 Nipawin, Saskatchewan, Canada
- Died: July 4, 2025 (aged 61) Norwood, Massachusetts, U.S.
- Height: 6 ft 2 in (188 cm)
- Weight: 200 lb (91 kg; 14 st 4 lb)
- Position: Right Wing
- Shot: Right
- Played for: Boston Bruins; San Jose Sharks
- NHL draft: 39th overall, 1982; Boston Bruins
- Playing career: 1984–1995

Lyndon Svi Byers (February 29, 1964 – July 4, 2025) was a Canadian professional ice hockey player and radio personality. Byers played in the National Hockey League (NHL) for parts of ten seasons with the Boston Bruins and San Jose Sharks, earning a reputation as one of the league's toughest enforcers. He was the cousin of former NHL forward Dane Byers.

== Playing career ==
Born in Nipawin, Saskatchewan, Byers spent a year with the Notre Dame Hounds before beginning his major junior career in 1981 with the Regina Pats of the Western Hockey League (WHL). The following year, the Boston Bruins selected him with a second-round pick (39th overall) at the 1982 NHL entry draft. His gritty style earned him a spot with Team Canada at the 1984 World Junior Championships in Nyköping, Sweden. Byers showed promise by scoring 32 goals in each of the next two seasons with Regina, but it was his 153 and 154 penalty minutes in each of those seasons that would be a better measure of his future professional career.

Joining the Bruins at the end of the 1983–84 season, he scored two goals and four assists for six points while amassing 32 PIMs. Bouncing back and forth between the parent club and the minors, his best statistical season came in 1987–88, when he registered 10 goals and 14 assists for 24 points while amassing 249 penalty minutes in 53 games.

Byers signed as a free-agent with the San Jose Sharks on November 7, 1992, where he finished his NHL career in 1992–93, before ending his professional playing career with the International Hockey League (IHL)'s Minnesota Moose in 1994–1995. He scored 28 goals and 43 assists for 71 points and amassed 1,081 PIMs in 279 NHL games over ten seasons.

== Entertainment career ==
Shortly after his playing career, Byers returned to the Boston area and became a member of the Hill Man Morning Show on radio station WAAF-FM, where he was an on-air personality and sports specialist for 23 years before the show ended. Byers moved to the afternoon slot along with co-host Mike Hsu. On September 3, 2019, Byers left the show.

== Personal life and death ==
Byers was married to Annie and had a son. He died on July 4, 2025, at the age of 61.

In May 2026, researchers at the Boston University CTE center determined that Byers had stage 3 chronic traumatic encephalopathy (CTE) at the time of his death.

== Career statistics ==
			Regular season					Playoffs
Season	Team	League	GP	G	A	Pts	PIM	GP	G	A	Pts	PIM
1981–82	Notre Dame Hounds	SMHL	37	35	42	77	106	—	—	—	—	—
1981–82	Regina Pats	WHL	57	18	25	43	169	20	5	6	11	48
1982–83	Regina Pats	WHL	70	32	38	70	153	5	1	1	2	16
1983–84	Regina Pats	WHL	58	32	57	89	154	—	—	—	—	—
1983–84	Boston Bruins	NHL	10	2	4	6	32	—	—	—	—	—
1984–85	Boston Bruins	NHL	33	3	8	11	41	—	—	—	—	—
1984–85	Hershey Bears	AHL	27	4	6	10	55	—	—	—	—	—
1985–86	Boston Bruins	NHL	5	0	2	2	9	—	—	—	—	—
1985–86	Moncton Golden Flames	AHL	14	2	4	6	26	—	—	—	—	—
1985–86	Milwaukee Admirals	IHL	8	0	2	2	22	—	—	—	—	—
1986–87	Boston Bruins	NHL	18	2	3	5	53	1	0	0	0	0
1986–87	Moncton Golden Flames	AHL	27	5	5	10	63	—	—	—	—	—
1987–88	Boston Bruins	NHL	53	10	14	24	236	11	1	2	3	62
1987–88	Maine Mariners	AHL	2	0	1	1	18	—	—	—	—	—
1988–89	Boston Bruins	NHL	49	0	4	4	218	2	0	0	0	0
1988–89	Maine Mariners	AHL	4	1	3	4	2	—	—	—	—	—
1989–90	Boston Bruins	NHL	43	4	4	8	159	17	1	0	1	12
1990–91	Boston Bruins	NHL	19	2	2	4	82	1	0	0	0	10
1991–92	Boston Bruins	NHL	31	1	1	2	129	5	0	0	0	12
1991–92	Maine Mariners	AHL	11	5	4	9	47	—	—	—	—	—
1992–93	San Jose Sharks	NHL	18	4	1	5	122	—	—	—	—	—
1992–93	Kansas City Blades	IHL	4	1	1	2	22	—	—	—	—	—
1992–93	San Diego Gulls	IHL	9	0	3	3	35	—	—	—	—	—
1993–94	Las Vegas Thunder	IHL	31	3	5	8	176	1	0	0	0	4
1994–95	Minnesota Moose	IHL	7	1	0	1	16	—	—	—	—	—
NHL totals			279	28	43	71	1081	37	2	2	4	96
