= Quaesitor =

Byzantine police official

The quaesitor (Greek: κοιαισίτωρ, κυαισίτωρ) was a Late Roman/Byzantine police official of Constantinople, specifically a magistrate, responsible for controlling the flow of legal and illegal immigration into the capital city of Byzantium. The office of the quaesitor was first established in 539 through the Novella 80 of Emperor Justinian I (r. 527–565), designed to deal with the arrival of unemployed people to Constantinople living as criminals or beggars. One of his functions was to investigate people passing through Constantinople by determining their names, origins, and reasons for being in the city. Furthermore, the quaesitor had the authority to deal with unemployed persons by forcing the physically fit among the unemployed to work in a public industry such as a bakery (if an unemployed person refused to work, he would be expelled from Constantinople). The quaesitor was also granted judicial functions whereby his court dealt with certain types of crimes such as forgery.

== Sources ==
- Bury, John Bagnell (1958) [1923]. History of the Later Roman Empire: From the Death of Theodosius I to the Death of Justinian, Volume 2. Mineola, New York: Dover Publications. OCLC 41478187.
- Moatti, Claudia (2013). "Immigration and Cosmopolitanization". In Erdkamp, Paul (ed.). The Cambridge Companion to Ancient Rome. Cambridge and New York: Cambridge University Press. pp. 77–92. ISBN 978-0-52-189629-0.
