= Steve DeOssie =

American football player (born 1962)

No. 55, 99, 50
- Position: Linebacker

Personal information
- Born: November 22, 1962 (age 63); Tacoma, Washington, U.S.
- Listed height: 6 ft 2 in (1.88 m)
- Listed weight: 248 lb (112 kg)

Career information
- High school: Don Bosco Tech (Boston, Massachusetts)
- College: Boston College
- NFL draft: 1984: 4th round, 110th overall pick

Career history
- Dallas Cowboys (1984–1988); New York Giants (1989–1993); New York Jets (1993); New England Patriots (1994–1995)

Awards and highlights
- Super Bowl champion (XXV); Second-team All-American (1983); 2× All-ECAC (1982, 1983)

Career NFL statistics
- Games played: 175
- Games started: 32
- Fumble recoveries: 1
- Stats at Pro Football Reference

Steve Leonard DeOssie (born November 22, 1962) is an American former professional football player who was a linebacker and long snapper in the National Football League (NFL) for the Dallas Cowboys, New York Giants, New York Jets, and New England Patriots. He played college football for the Boston College Eagles.

== Early life ==
DeOssie attended the now defunct Don Bosco Technical High School in Boston, Massachusetts, playing for head coach Bob Currier. He also played catcher in baseball. He received All-state honors in football, baseball and basketball.

He accepted a football scholarship from Boston College, where he was a four-year starter at middle linebacker and the team's long snapper. Early in his career he was used at fullback in short-yardage situations. Which included a key block enabling BC to upset #11 Stanford University.

As a junior, he had a career-high 135 tackles, while helping the Eagles reach their first bowl game in 41 years (Tangerine Bowl). As a senior, he had 111 tackles, even though he was slowed by a separated shoulder.

He earned All-East honors in his last two seasons, was a tri-captain, led the team in tackles in his last 3 years and finished with a school record with 447 career tackles. In 1997, he was inducted into the Boston College Varsity Club Athletic Hall of Fame.

== Professional career ==
=== Dallas Cowboys ===
DeOssie was selected by the Dallas Cowboys in the fourth round (110th overall) of the 1984 NFL draft, after dropping because he was selected by the New Jersey Generals in the first round (15th overall) of the 1984 USFL draft. As a rookie, besides being the long snapper on punts, he was the backup linebacker behind rookie Eugene Lockhart. He had 8 defensive tackles. He was nicknamed "Barney Rubble" by his teammates. A couple years later they nicknamed him beach ball, because of the many shades of color his face would turn in the sun.

His contributions came mainly on special teams as the unit long snapper and covering kickoffs. He also played in the short yardage and goal-line defenses. In 1988, he ranked third on the team in special teams tackles (20). He made his first two starts, when he was used at outside linebacker, finishing the season with 26 tackles.

As described by head coach Bill Belichick on an August 30, 2011 press conference, DeOssie's ability to snap the ball and block in the same play was exploited by the Cowboys to spread the punt formations and use less blockers, revolutionizing the punt game.

In June 1989, he clashed with the new coaching staff that was brought by Jimmy Johnson, and was traded to the New York Giants in exchange for their sixth round draft choice (#163-Derrick Walker) in the 1990 NFL draft. He is considered to be one of the best special teams players in Cowboys history.

=== New York Giants ===
In 1989, DeOssie became one of the starting inside linebackers in the team's 3-4 defense, playing mainly as a run defender. After the third game of the season against the Phoenix Cardinals, he suffered a left toe injury that required surgery and caused him to miss seven games, returning until November 15.

In 1990, he started 13 games and helped the Giants win Super Bowl XXV. On December 6, 1992, he was placed on the injured reserve list. On November 10, 1993, new head coach Dan Reeves waived him from the team.

=== New York Jets ===
On November 15, 1993, he was signed by the New York Jets to help on special teams.

=== New England Patriots ===
In 1994, he signed with the New England Patriots reuniting with his former head coach Bill Parcells. He played two seasons before being waived on August 25, 1996.

== Personal life ==
DeOssie formerly hosted The New England Tailgate Show, which aired on NBC Sports Boston. He also used to work as the Patriots and NFL analyst for 93.7 WEEI Sports Radio in Boston and WHDH TV.

Along with friend and colleague Fred Smerlas, he opened the award-winning Fred & Steve's Steakhouse at the Twin River Casino in Lincoln, Rhode Island in March 2007. DeOssie is a partner in the Blackstone's Cigar Bar also at the Twin River Casino.

His son, Zak, played as a long snapper in the NFL for the New York Giants. The DeOssies are the only father-son combination to win Super Bowls with the same team.
