= List of Boston Celtics broadcasters =

== Television ==
=== 2020s ===
Year	Channel	Play-by-play	Color commentator(s)	Courtside reporter	Studio host	Studio analysts
2024-25	NBC Sports Boston	Drew Carter	Brian Scalabrine (primary)	Abby Chin or Chris Forsberg	Abby Chin	Chris Forsberg, Brian Scalabrine, Kendrick Perkins and/or Eddie House
2023-24	NBC Sports Boston	Mike Gorman (home games) Drew Carter (road games)	Brian Scalabrine (primary)	Abby Chin or Amina Smith	Abby Chin or Amina Smith	Chris Forsberg, Brian Scalabrine, Kendrick Perkins and/or Eddie House
2022-23	NBC Sports Boston	Mike Gorman Sean Grande (most road games) Brian Scalabrine (select games)	Brian Scalabrine (primary) Eddie House (when Scalabrine is on play-by-play) Cedric Maxwell (select games)	Abby Chin or Amina Smith	Abby Chin or Amina Smith	Chris Forsberg, Brian Scalabrine, Kendrick Perkins and/or Eddie House
2021-22	NBC Sports Boston	Mike Gorman	Brian Scalabrine	Abby Chin, Chris Forsberg, or Chris Mannix	Abby Chin or Amina Smith	Chris Forsberg, Brian Scalabrine, Kendrick Perkins and/or Chris Mannix
2020-21	NBC Sports Boston	Mike Gorman	Brian Scalabrine	Abby Chin, Chris Forsberg, Brian Scalabrine, Kendrick Perkins or Chris Mannix	Abby Chin	Chris Forsberg, Brian Scalabrine, Kendrick Perkins and/or Chris Mannix

=== 2010s ===
Year	Channel	Play-by-play	Color commentator(s)	Courtside reporter	Studio host	Studio analysts
2019-20	NBC Sports Boston	Mike Gorman or Kyle Draper	Tom Heinsohn (Home Games); Brian Scalabrine (Road Games)	Abby Chin	Kyle Draper	Tom Heinsohn, Brian Scalabrine, Tim Welsh and/or Chris Mannix
2018-19	NBC Sports Boston	Mike Gorman or Kyle Draper	Tom Heinsohn (Home Games); Brian Scalabrine (Road Games)	Abby Chin	Kyle Draper	Tom Heinsohn, Brian Scalabrine, Tim Welsh and/or Chris Mannix
2017-18	NBC Sports Boston	Mike Gorman	Tom Heinsohn (Home Games); Brian Scalabrine (Road Games)	Abby Chin	Kyle Draper	Tom Heinsohn, Brian Scalabrine, Tim Welsh and/or Chris Mannix
2016-17	Comcast SportsNet New England	Mike Gorman	Tom Heinsohn (Home Games); Brian Scalabrine (Road Games)	Abby Chin	Kyle Draper	Tom Heinsohn, Brian Scalabrine, Tim Welsh and/or Chris Mannix
2015-16	Comcast SportsNet New England	Mike Gorman	Tom Heinsohn (Home Games); Brian Scalabrine (Road Games)	Abby Chin	Kyle Draper	Tom Heinsohn, Brian Scalabrine, Tim Welsh and/or Chris Mannix
2014-15	Comcast SportsNet New England	Mike Gorman	Tom Heinsohn (Home Games); Brian Scalabrine (Road Games)	Abby Chin	Kyle Draper	Tom Heinsohn, Brian Scalabrine, Tim Welsh and/or Chris Mannix
2013-14	Comcast SportsNet New England	Mike Gorman	Tom Heinsohn (Home Games); Dave Cowens, Cedric Maxwell, Danny Ainge, or Chris Herren (Road Games)	Abby Chin	Kyle Draper	Tom Heinsohn, Dave Cowens, Tim Welsh and/or Chris Mannix
2012-13	Comcast SportsNet New England	Mike Gorman	Tom Heinsohn; Donny Marshall or Brian Scalabrine (Select Road Games)	Greg Dickerson	Gary Tanguay	Donny Marshall, Brian Scalabrine, and/or Tom Heinsohn
2011-12	Comcast SportsNet New England	Mike Gorman	Tom Heinsohn or Donny Marshall (Select Road Games)	Greg Dickerson	Gary Tanguay	Donny Marshall or Tom Heinsohn (Select road games)
2010-11	Comcast SportsNet New England	Mike Gorman	Tom Heinsohn (Home games and Atlantic Division road games); Donny Marshall (Most road games); Bill Walton (4 West Coast road games)	Greg Dickerson	Gary Tanguay	Donny Marshall, Tom Heinsohn, and/or Dave Cowens

=== 2000s ===
Year	Channel	Play-by-play	Color commentator(s)	Courtside reporter	Studio host	Studio analysts
2009-10	Comcast SportsNet New England	Mike Gorman	Tom Heinsohn or Donny Marshall (Select Road Games)	Greg Dickerson	Gary Tanguay	Donny Marshall or Tom Heinsohn (Select road games)
2008-09	Comcast SportsNet New England	Mike Gorman	Tom Heinsohn or Donny Marshall (Select Road Games)	Greg Dickerson	Gary Tanguay	Donny Marshall or Tom Heinsohn (Select road games)
2007-08	Comcast SportsNet New England	Mike Gorman	Tom Heinsohn or Donny Marshall (Select Road Games)	Greg Dickerson	Gary Tanguay	Donny Marshall or Tom Heinsohn (Select road games)
2006-07	FSN New England	Mike Gorman	Tom Heinsohn	Greg Dickerson	Gary Tanguay	Donny Marshall
2005-06	FSN New England	Mike Gorman	Tom Heinsohn	Greg Dickerson	Gary Tanguay	Donny Marshall
2004-05	FSN New England	Mike Gorman	Tom Heinsohn	Willie Maye	Gary Tanguay & Greg Dickerson	Guest Analysts
2003-04	Fox Sports Net New England	Mike Gorman	Tom Heinsohn	Willie Maye	Gary Tanguay & Greg Dickerson	Guest Analysts
2002-03	Fox Sports Net New England	Mike Gorman	Tom Heinsohn	Willie Maye	Gary Tanguay & Greg Dickerson	Guest Analysts
2001-02	Fox Sports Net New England	Mike Gorman	Tom Heinsohn	Willie Maye	Gary Tanguay & Greg Dickerson	Guest Analysts
2000-01	Fox Sports Net New England	Mike Gorman	Tom Heinsohn	Willie Maye	Gary Tanguay & Eric Frede	Guest Analysts

=== 1990s ===
Year	Channel	Play-by-play	Color commentator(s)	Courtside reporter	Studio host	Studio analysts
1999-2000	Fox Sports Net New England	Mike Gorman	Tom Heinsohn	Willie Maye	Gary Tanguay & Eric Frede	Guest Analysts
1998-99	Fox Sports New England; WABU	Mike Gorman	Tom Heinsohn	Willie Maye	Eric Frede	
1998-99	Fox Sports New England; WABU	Tom Heinsohn	Bob Cousy		Doug Brown	
1997-98	SportsChannel New England; WSBK-TV	Mike Gorman	Tom Heinsohn	Willie Maye	Leah Secondo	
1997-98	SportsChannel New England; WSBK-TV	Tom Heinsohn	Bob Cousy			
1996-97	SportsChannel New England; WSBK-TV	Mike Gorman	Tom Heinsohn	Willie Maye	Kim Walden	
1996-97	SportsChannel New England; WSBK-TV	Tom Heinsohn	Bob Cousy			
1995-96	SportsChannel New England; WSBK	Mike Gorman	Tom Heinsohn		Willie Maye	
1995-96	SportsChannel New England; WSBK	Tom Heinsohn	Bob Cousy		Doug Brown	
1994-95	SportsChannel New England; WSBK-TV	Mike Gorman	Tom Heinsohn		Willie Maye	
1994-95	SportsChannel New England; WSBK-TV	Tom Heinsohn	Bob Cousy		Doug Brown	
1993-94	SportsChannel New England; WSBK-TV; WBZ-TV	Mike Gorman	Tom Heinsohn		Mike Lynch	
1993-94	SportsChannel New England; WSBK-TV; WBZ-TV	Tom Heinsohn	Bob Cousy		Doug Brown	
1993-94	SportsChannel New England; WSBK-TV; WBZ-TV	Tom Heinsohn	Bob Cousy		Bob Lobel (Weeknights) or Bob Neumeier (Weekends)	
1992-93	SportsChannel New England; WFXT	Mike Gorman	Tom Heinsohn		Bob Lobel	
1992-93	SportsChannel New England; WFXT	Tom Heinsohn	Bob Cousy	Jimmy Myers	Jimmy Myers	
1991-92	SportsChannel New England; WFXT	Mike Gorman	Tom Heinsohn		Bob Lobel	
1991-92	SportsChannel New England; WFXT	Tom Heinsohn	Bob Cousy	Jimmy Myers	Jimmy Myers	Dennis Johnson (Playoffs Only)
1990-91	SportsChannel New England; WFXT	Mike Gorman	Tom Heinsohn		Bob Lobel	
1990-91	SportsChannel New England; WFXT	Tom Heinsohn	Bob Cousy	Jimmy Myers	Jimmy Myers	

=== 1980s ===
Year	Channel	Play-by-play	Color commentator(s)	Studio host
1989-90	SportsChannel New England; WLVI-TV	Mike Gorman	Tom Heinsohn	Bob Lobel
1989-90	SportsChannel New England; WLVI-TV	Mike Crispino	Bob Cousy	
1988-89	SportsChannel New England; WLVI-TV	Mike Gorman	Tom Heinsohn	
1988-89	SportsChannel New England; WLVI-TV	Gil Santos	Bob Cousy	
1987-88	SportsChannel New England; WLVI-TV	Mike Gorman	Tom Heinsohn	
1987-88	SportsChannel New England; WLVI-TV	Gil Santos	Bob Cousy	Bob Gamere
1986-87	SportsChannel New England; WLVI-TV	Mike Gorman	Tom Heinsohn	
1986-87	SportsChannel New England; WLVI-TV	Gil Santos	Bob Cousy	
1985-86	SportsChannel New England; WLVI-TV	Mike Gorman	Tom Heinsohn	
1985-86	SportsChannel New England; WLVI-TV	Gil Santos	Bob Cousy	
1984-85	SportsChannel New England; WBZ-TV	Mike Gorman	Tom Heinsohn	
1984-85	SportsChannel New England; WBZ-TV	Gil Santos	Bob Cousy	
1983-84	SportsChannel New England; WBZ-TV	Mike Gorman	Tom Heinsohn	
1983-84	SportsChannel New England; WBZ-TV	Gil Santos	Bob Cousy	
1982-83	PRISM New England; WBZ-TV	Mike Gorman	Tom Heinsohn	
1982-83	PRISM New England; WBZ-TV	Gil Santos	Bob Cousy	
1981-82	PRISM New England; WBZ-TV	Mike Gorman	Tom Heinsohn	
1981-82	PRISM New England; WBZ-TV	Gil Santos	Bob Cousy	
1980-81	WBZ-TV	Roger Twibell	Bob Cousy	

=== 1970s ===
Year	Channel	Play-by-play	Color commentator(s)
1979-80	WBZ-TV	Roger Twibell	Bob Cousy
1978-79	WBZ-TV	Roger Twibell	Bob Cousy
1977-78	WBZ-TV	Len Berman	Bob Cousy
1976-77	WBZ-TV; HBO	Len Berman; Dick Stockton	Bob Cousy
1975-76	WBZ-TV	Len Berman	Bob Cousy
1974-75	WBZ-TV	Dick Stockton	Bob Cousy
1973-74	WBZ-TV	Johnny Most	Len Berman
1972-73	WSMW	Bob Fouracre	
1971-72	WSMW-TV	Bob Fouracre	
1970-71	WSMW-TV	Cy Follmer	Red Auerbach

=== 1960s ===
Year	Channel	Play-by-play	Color commentator(s)
1969-70	WSMW-TV	Cy Follmer	Red Auerbach (select games)
1968-69	WKBG-TV; WSBK-TV (playoffs only)	Tom Heinsohn	Red Auerbach
1967-68	WKBG-TV	Tom Heinsohn	Red Auerbach
1966-67	WKBG-TV	Marty Glickman or Tom Heinsohn	Tom Heinsohn
1965-66	WHDH-TV (mainly playoff away games)	Don Gillis	Tom Heinsohn
1964-65	WIHS-TV (playoff games simulcast on WHDH-TV)	Harry Caray	Bill Sharman
1963-64	WHDH-TV	Don Gillis	
1962-63	WHDH-TV	Don Gillis	
1961-62	WHDH-TV	Don Gillis	
1960-61	WHDH-TV	Curt Gowdy	

=== 1950s ===
Year	Channel	Play-by-play	Color commentator(s)	Sideline reporter
1955-56	WBZ-TV	Leo Egan	Johnny Most	
1952-53	WNAC-TV	Curt Gowdy		Les Smith

== Substitutes ==
=== Play-by-Play ===
- Mike Crispino (1988–89)
- Mike Lynch (1988–94)
- Bob Lobel (1989–93)
- Gary Tanguay (2007–Present)

=== Color commentator ===
- John Havlicek (1983–89)
- Hank Finkel (1983–93)
- Rick Weitzman (1983–90)
- Dave Gavitt (1983–89)
- Upton Bell (1983–88)
- Jimmy Myers (1983–90)
- Bob Ryan (1983–89)
- M.L. Carr (1985–89)
- Dave Cowens (1985–89)
- Ronnie Perry Jr. (1988–90)
- Cedric Maxwell (2007–present)
- Bill Raftery (2009–10)

=== Courtside Reporter ===
- Willie Maye (2008–Present)

=== Studio Host ===
- Paul Devlin (1998–99)
- Mike Felger (2007–Present)

=== Studio Analyst ===
- Tim Welsh (2008–09)

== Notes ==
- From 1975 to 1995, select Celtics games were shown in the Hartford area on WATR-TV (1975–1982), WTXX (1982–1995), and WTIC-TV (1987–1995).

== Radio ==
=== 2020s ===
Year	Flagship Station	Play-by-play	Color commentator(s)	Studio host
2022-23	WBZ-FM	Sean Grande Jon Wallach (when Grande is on NBC Sports Boston)	Cedric Maxwell Abby Chin (when Maxwell is on NBC Sports Boston)	
2021-22	WBZ-FM	Sean Grande	Cedric Maxwell	
2020-21	WBZ-FM	Sean Grande	Cedric Maxwell	

=== 2010s ===
Year	Flagship Station	Play-by-play	Color commentator(s)	Studio host
2019-20	WBZ-FM	Sean Grande	Cedric Maxwell	
2018-19	WBZ-FM	Sean Grande	Cedric Maxwell	
2017-18	WBZ-FM	Sean Grande	Cedric Maxwell	
2016-17	WBZ-FM	Sean Grande	Cedric Maxwell	
2015-16	WBZ-FM	Sean Grande	Cedric Maxwell	
2014-15	WBZ-FM	Sean Grande	Cedric Maxwell	
2013-14	WBZ-FM	Sean Grande	Cedric Maxwell	
2012-13	WEEI	Sean Grande	Cedric Maxwell	John Ryder
2011-12	WEEI	Sean Grande	Cedric Maxwell	John Ryder
2010-11	WEEI	Sean Grande	Cedric Maxwell	John Ryder

=== 2000s ===
Year	Flagship Station	Play-by-play	Color commentator(s)	Studio host
2009-10	WEEI	Sean Grande	Cedric Maxwell	John Ryder
2008-09	WEEI	Sean Grande	Cedric Maxwell	John Ryder
2007-08	WEEI	Sean Grande	Cedric Maxwell	John Ryder
2006-07	WRKO	Sean Grande	Cedric Maxwell	Jimmy Myers and Jimmy Young
2005-06	WRKO	Sean Grande	Cedric Maxwell	Jimmy Myers and Jimmy Young
2004-05	WWZN	Sean Grande	Cedric Maxwell	Jimmy Myers
2003-04	WWZN	Sean Grande	Cedric Maxwell	Jimmy Myers
2002-03	WWZN	Sean Grande	Cedric Maxwell	Jimmy Myers
2001-02	WWZN	Sean Grande	Cedric Maxwell	Dave Jageler & Marty Tirrell
2000-01	WEEI	Howard David	Cedric Maxwell	Ted Sarandis

=== 1990s ===
Year	Flagship Station	Play-by-play	Color commentator(s)	Studio host
1999-2000	WEEI	Howard David	Cedric Maxwell	Ted Sarandis
1998-99	WEEI	Howard David	Cedric Maxwell	Ted Sarandis
1997-98	WEEI	Howard David	Cedric Maxwell	Ted Sarandis
1996-97	WEEI	Spencer Ross	Cedric Maxwell	Ted Sarandis
1995-96	WRKO	Spencer Ross	Cedric Maxwell	Ted Sarandis
1994-95	WEEI	Glenn Ordway	Jerry Sichting	Craig Mustard
1993-94	WEEI	Glenn Ordway	Jerry Sichting	Craig Mustard
1992-93	WEEI	Glenn Ordway	Jerry Sichting	Craig Mustard
1991-92	WEEI	Glenn Ordway	Jerry Sichting	Craig Mustard
1990-91	WEEI	Glenn Ordway	Doug Brown	Craig Mustard

=== 1980s ===
Year	Flagship Station	Play-by-play	Color commentator(s)	Studio host
1989-90	WEEI	Glenn Ordway	Doug Brown or Johnny Most	Craig Mustard
1988-89	WEEI	Johnny Most	Glenn Ordway	Glenn Ordway
1987-88	WEEI	Johnny Most	Glenn Ordway	Glenn Ordway
1986-87	WRKO	Johnny Most	Glenn Ordway	Glenn Ordway
1985-86	WRKO	Johnny Most	Glenn Ordway	Glenn Ordway
1984-85	WRKO	Johnny Most	Glenn Ordway	Glenn Ordway
1983-84	WRKO	Johnny Most	Glenn Ordway	Glenn Ordway
1982-83	WRKO	Johnny Most	Glenn Ordway	Glenn Ordway
1981-82	WRKO	Johnny Most	Rick Weitzman	Glenn Ordway
1980-81	WBZ	Johnny Most	Rick Weitzman	Gil Santos

=== 1970s ===
Year	Flagship Station	Play-by-play	Color commentator(s)	Studio host
1979-80	WBZ	Johnny Most	Gil Santos	Gil Santos
1978-79	WBZ	Johnny Most	Gil Santos	Gil Santos
1977-78	WBZ	Johnny Most	Bob Lobel (home games)	
1976-77	WBZ	Johnny Most		
1975-76	WBZ	Johnny Most		
1974-75	WBZ	Johnny Most		
1973-74	WBZ	Johnny Most	Len Berman	
1972-73	WBZ	Johnny Most		
1971-72	WBZ	Johnny Most		
1970-71	WBZ	Johnny Most		

=== 1960s ===
Year	Flagship Station	Play-by-play	Color commentator(s)
1969-70	WBZ	Johnny Most	Wayne Embry
1968-69	WHDH	Johnny Most	
1967-68	WHDH	Johnny Most	
1966-67	WHDH	Johnny Most	
1965-66	WHDH	Johnny Most	
1964-65	WHDH	Johnny Most	Jim Pansullo
1963-64	WHDH	Johnny Most	
1962-63	WHDH	Johnny Most	
1961-62	WHDH	Johnny Most	Bill Harrington
1960-61	WHDH	Johnny Most	John Bassett

=== 1950s ===
Year	Flagship Station	Play-by-play	Color commentator(s)
1959-60	WHDH	Johnny Most	
1958-59	WHDH	Johnny Most	
1957-58	WHDH	Johnny Most	
1956-57	WHDH	Johnny Most	
1955-56	WHDH	Johnny Most	
1954-55	WNAC	Johnny Most	
1953-54	WCOP	Johnny Most	
1952-53	WHDH	Curt Gowdy	Don Gillis
1951-52	WHDH	Curt Gowdy	Don Gillis

== Substitutes ==
=== Play by Play ===
- Bob Lobel (1976–1978)
- Gil Santos (1979–1980)
- Glenn Ordway (1981–1989)
- Sean McDonough (1997–2001)
- Ted Sarandis (1997–2001)
- Jeff Twiss (1998–99)
- Dave Jageler (2001–2002)
- Dale Arnold (2010–2011)

=== Color commentator ===
- Jimmy Myers (2002–2003)

== See also ==
- List of current National Basketball Association broadcasters
- List of Boston Red Sox broadcasters
- List of Boston Bruins broadcasters
- List of New England Patriots broadcasters

== Notes ==
- From 1999 to 2008, Bob Cousy appeared as a part-time analyst on Celtics games, calling about 10 games each season.
- During the 1980 NBA Playoffs, Johnny Most split play-by-play duties with Gil Santos due to problems with Most's voice. Most called the first and fourth quarters and served as an analyst during the second and third, while Santos called the second and third and analyzed the other two.
