= WUTF-TV =

Television station in Worcester, Massachusetts

- Worcester–Boston, Massachusetts; United States
- City: Worcester, Massachusetts
- Channels: Digital: 19 (UHF); Virtual: 27
- Branding: UniMás Boston

Programming
- Affiliations: 27.1: UniMás; for others, see § Subchannels

Ownership
- Owner: Entravision Communications; (Entravision Holdings, LLC)
- Sister stations: WUNI

History
- First air date: January 2, 1970
- Former call signs: WSMW-TV (1970–1985); WHLL (1986–1993); WUNI (1993–2017)
- Former channel numbers: Analog: 27 (UHF, 1970–2009); Digital: 29 (UHF, until 2019)
- Former affiliations: Independent (1970–1980, 1985–1992); Preview (1980–1985); Telemundo (1992–1993); Univision (1993–2017)
- Call sign meaning: Univision Telefutura (UniMás was formerly named Telefutura)

Technical information
- Licensing authority: FCC
- Facility ID: 30577
- ERP: 485 kW
- HAAT: 467 m (1,532 ft)
- Transmitter coordinates: 42°20′9″N 71°42′55″W

Links
- Public license information: Public file; LMS
- Website: www.univision.com/unimas

WUTF-TV (channel 27) is a television station licensed to Worcester, Massachusetts, United States, broadcasting the Spanish-language UniMás network to the Boston area. It is owned by Entravision Communications and operated alongside Univision station WUNI (channel 66). WUTF-TV's studios are located on 4th Avenue in Needham, and it is broadcast from Stiles Hill in Boylston, Massachusetts.

Channel 27 began broadcasting on January 2, 1970, as WSMW-TV, an English-language independent station established by the Worcester-based insurer State Mutual. In its early years, it was heavy on local programming, including two daily local newscasts covering Central Massachusetts news and telecasts of Boston Celtics basketball and local sporting events. Though the local shows and newscast length were reduced, the station followed much this format through its first decade and a 1977 sale to the Simon family of Indianapolis. In 1980, channel 27 began devoting evening and afternoon airtime to Preview, an over-the-air subscription television service that broadcast movies, special events, and sports to paying subscribers. At one point, Preview on WSMW-TV was the nation's 7th-largest STV service with 60,000 subscribers.

Central Massachusetts Television, a firm owned by Nolanda Hill, acquired WSMW-TV in 1983, and a related company acquired the Preview service. The station moved its studios to a converted school in Shrewsbury and discontinued its news department and other local programming in 1984. Preview lost subscribers to cable and cheap decoder boxes and ceased programming on December 31, 1985. The station reverted to an ad-supported, general-entertainment independent with a selection of local programs, though never a newscast. In 1992, the station began airing Spanish-language programming, first from Telemundo and later Univision. Hill's TV stations were foreclosed on by the Jasas Corporation in 1993; Jasas maintained the Univision affiliation, selling channel 27 to Entravision in 2000. The station debuted a local newscast in 2003.

Though Univision had come to own channel 66, which was programmed with the Telefutura network (now UniMás), Entravision operated channels 27 and 66 under a joint sales agreement. In 2017, Univision moved the network programming and WUNI call letters to its own transmitter on channel 66, with UniMás moving to channel 27.

== As an English-language station ==
=== WSMW-TV: Early years ===
On April 11, 1968, the State Mutual Broadcasting Corporation applied to the Federal Communications Commission (FCC) for a construction permit to build a new TV station on ultra high frequency (UHF) channel 27 in Worcester, Massachusetts. State Mutual Broadcasting was a subsidiary of the Worcester-based State Mutual Life Assurance Corporation of America. The FCC voted to grant the permit by a 5–1 vote that December, overriding concerns from commissioner Nicholas Johnson about the participation of other Worcester broadcasters in the ownership of State Mutual. State Mutual was granted the call sign WSMW-TV, containing its initials, and construction of studios on land behind State Mutual's headquarters on Lincoln Street began in May 1969. State Mutual incorporated the America Group, a holding company, to serve as the direct corporate owner of WSMW-TV and other non-insurance subsidiaries. A 1,285-foot (392 m) tower was erected on Stiles Hill in Boylston to transmit the new station.

WSMW-TV began broadcasting on January 2, 1970, as an independent station. Its original program schedule included two daily hour-long newscasts, airing at 5:30 and 10 p.m. Beyond news, the station aired the children's program Ratherdo and the variety program etc., and Boston Celtics basketball games, with Cy Follmer serving as channel 27's sports director and commentator on Celtics games with Red Auerbach. Later that year, the station acquired the Bozo franchise previously held by Boston's WHDH-TV (channel 5) for more than a decade. Tom Matzell, a member of channel 27's production staff, became the youngest Bozo host in the nation. Other programming on the station included bowling and a telecast of the daily Catholic Mass.

Channel 27 offered two daily hour-long newscasts until September 1971, when it restructured to have half-hour 10 and 11 p.m. newscasts, one more regional and one counterprogramming the Boston stations with Worcester news. In 1973, it canceled Bozo and opted not to renew its deal to cover the Celtics, noting that ratings were falling for Bozo and it attracted more viewers at less expense by telecasting games from Assumption College or the College of the Holy Cross in Worcester. State Mutual held discussions with the Massachusetts state college system about selling channel 27 to become an instructional TV station, However, the Massachusetts Senate failed to set aside funds to acquire WSMW-TV, canceling the deal. In the meantime, the station developed a line of business in producing commercials for such national clients as Chrysler–Plymouth. Re-enactments of the Watergate tapes seen nationally on PBS were produced at WSMW-TV.

State Mutual put WSMW-TV up for sale in August 1976. It cited a desire to concentrate on its insurance lines of business. Melvin Simon and Herb Simon, brothers and real estate developers from Indianapolis, agreed to acquire channel 27. The $550,000 (equivalent to $2.35 million in 2025 dollars) sale was approved in April 1977, after the Simon brothers and their firm, Sibos, Inc., entered into an agreement with a citizens' group seeking to make the station more responsive to minority interests. Few changes were made by the new owners.

=== Subscription television ===
Under State Mutual, WSMW-TV signed an agreement in late 1975 with American Subscription Television of Massachusetts for the broadcasting of over-the-air subscription television (STV) over channel 27. The station hoped to draw more viewers in prime time, where it was not competitive in the ratings against the network affiliates. The Milwaukee-based firm intended to begin STV broadcasting as early as 1977, but in the intervening years, the service was changed to be provided by Preview, a division of Time Inc.'s American Television and Communications.

On September 8, 1980, WSMW began broadcasting Preview in prime time to paying subscribers. The 10 p.m. newscast was moved to 6:30 p.m.; taped college football continued, while live college basketball coverage was dropped entirely. Preview competed with cable as well as WQTV (channel 68) in Boston, which broadcast subscription programming. Preview provided movies, sports programs, specials, and late-night adult films. Preview rapidly signed up 10,000 customers by November 1980 and 17,000 by January 1981 for its programming, which began at 7 p.m. on weeknights and 3 p.m on weekends. Subscribers came from points as distant as Providence, Rhode Island; Manchester, New Hampshire; and York, Maine. Preview initially charged subscribers $45 (equivalent to $68.00 in 2025 dollars) for installation of the necessary decoder and $17.50 (equivalent to $57.00 in 2025 dollars) a month, but the monthly fee rose to $22.50 (equivalent to $73.00 in 2025 dollars) in September 1982, when Preview began programming all-night content.

By June 1982, WSMW had the seventh-most subscribers of any STV system in America, with 60,000. Its principal competitor, Star on WQTV, had 52,000. The industry began to decline not long after, and WQTV's program provider, Satellite Television & Associated Resources, was among the earliest to fail. At the end of January 1983, Star's 23,000 remaining subscribers received Preview program guides for February; on February 12, WQTV's subscription service was foreclosed on and sold. Preview bought the subscriber list and temporarily simulcast most of its programming on both channels 68 and 27 until it could switch Star's subscribers to Preview equipment.

After the merger, Preview expanded in February to a 5 p.m. start and, on July 1, 1983, to 9 a.m. on weekdays and all day on weekends. WSMW-TV's English-language newscast moved first to 4:30 p.m. and then to early mornings to accommodate the increasing airtime devoted to subscription service, airing as two 15-minute segments at 7 and 7:45 a.m. A Spanish-language segment in the newscast, which had aired for 11 years, was discontinued with the new arrangement.

During this era, WSMW began to make preparations to leave its existing studios, which were leased from State Mutual and not included in the 1977 sale. Citing space issues—with State Mutual occupying part of the building—and a rent increase, the station announced its intention to move by 1983. The station moved to the former North Shore School in Shrewsbury, which was being reconditioned by the city to support a municipally owned cable television system. No site in Worcester was available that provided the line of sight necessary to the Stiles Hill tower. The news was presented from behind desks once used by teachers in a classroom.

=== Sale to Nolanda Hill ===
In September 1983, Sibos announced that it had sold WSMW-TV to Central Massachusetts Television Inc., owned by Nolanda Hill of Dallas. Management initially expressed hope that, under the new owners, WSMW-TV could increase local program output, though that was dependent on their contract with Preview. Even though Central Massachusetts Television wanted to reduce STV airtime to add financial news and Spanish-language local programming, Preview's contract allowed the company to buy the airtime it wanted. During the sale process, Preview was also sold to Independent American Satellite Television, a subsidiary of the Independent American Group of Dallas, which earlier that year had bought the VEU service on Dallas's KNBN-TV, the station Hill had helped to found there. A representative of Time Inc. indicated that Hill was an investor in Independent American Satellite Television. Time exited the STV business by selling the operation, which at the time had 40,000 subscribers.

Despite Hill's promises to rejuvenate the station by bolstering the news department, the commissioning of theme music for the newscast, orders for new equipment, advertisements seeking production staff, and even the taping of a pilot for a locally produced Spanish-language magazine program in early June 1984, the hoped-for local programming expansion never materialized. Instead, on June 8, 1984, WSMW-TV discontinued local programming and laid off 20 employees. Hill cited the inability to relocate in Worcester, poor programming quality, and the station's financial condition. The move came after an attempt by employees to unionize and following a decision by Shrewsbury against WSMW's plans to build a temporary annex at the North Shore School site. The station soon began investigating another move, meeting with selectmen in Boylston about a potential studio building at Stiles Hill.

Preview programming was cut back to start at 7 p.m. by 1985. At the start of December, Preview informed its subscribers that it would cease service at year's end. It cited competition from sales of decoders, a threat to a business model that relied on monthly subscriptions, and historic lows in subscriptions, which had fallen back to 15,000 by July and 10,000 by December. A Preview executive noted that the closures of other STV operations left a surplus of decoder equipment which could be modified to work on WSMW's service. SelecTV provided Preview's programming in its last months on air.

=== WHLL ===
With the end of Preview, channel 27 once more had to compete for prime time viewers in a marketplace that was more crowded than it was five years prior. On January 1, 1986, WSMW-TV changed call signs to WHLL and adopted a format featuring five films each weekday as well as children's and syndicated programs. The station had less than a month's notice to put together the new schedule.

In 1987, WHLL applied to double its effective radiated power to improve its signal in Boston and the western suburbs. Hill Broadcasting at that time changed its name to Corridor Broadcasting Company. The station began increasing its identification with Boston in its advertising and on-air promotion. During this time, the station aired scattered local programming, including an evening bingo program; the weekly music program Local Licks, which was edited at Corridor's Washington, D.C., station, WFTY; Live at Nick's Comedy Stop, taped at a Boston comedy club; and the Friday night dance party show Uptown Friday Night, taped in Worcester. A public affairs series, 27 West, debuted in 1988, along with hourly newsbreaks. In 1989, it aired the Kiss Video Request Show, a music video and entertainment information program featuring on-air personalities from WXKS-FM. A full local news department was considered but difficult due to space and cost considerations.

To draw viewers to the station, channel 27 picked up two ABC programs not broadcast by WCVB-TV, even though they brought in little revenue. It also aired ABC college basketball games that WCVB-TV did not air and NBC reruns and programs not aired by WBZ-TV. In 1990, the station debuted a nightly talk show, Contact with Jerry Williams, and acquired the rights to air Dave Maynard's Talent Showcase, a long-running talent show. However, the producer of the programs canceled them for cost reasons, citing poor advertiser support. An agreement to subcontract Boston Celtics coverage from WFXT was scrapped after two preseason contests received record-low ratings for the basketball team and because viewers on the South Shore were outside WHLL's broadcast area.

=== Notable former on-air staff ===
- Upton Bell – college football color commentator, 1979–1982
- Doug Brown – sportscaster, c. 1983
- Gino Cappelletti – college football color commentator
- Bob Cousy – college basketball color commentator
- Cy Follmer – sportscaster, 1970–1971
- Bob Fouracre – sportscaster, Bay State Bowling host, Boston Celtics play-by-play announcer, college football and basketball play-by-play announcer, 1971–1980
- Stephen Guptill – elderly affairs reporter and host of The Elder American, 1972–1975
- Doug White – news anchor, 1970–1972

== As a Spanish-language station ==
=== First Telemundo, then Univision ===
In April 1992, WHLL completed an affiliation agreement with the Spanish-language network Telemundo for evening and prime time hours. Several programming employees were dismissed because they did not speak Spanish. WHLL began airing 44 hours of Telemundo programming on July 4, 1992. The switch to Spanish also brought with it the station's first daily newscast since 1984 with the October 12 debut of the nightly Noticias de Nueva Inglaterra, which had its own news team and was supplemented by the resources of New England Cable News. By this time, channel 27's non-Telemundo programming day consisted of home shopping from ValueVision.

In a two-month span in June and July 1993, channel 27 moved studios to a former warehouse along Route 128 in the Boston suburb of Needham, supporting the news operation and providing more space than in Shrewsbury; changed affiliations from Telemundo to its rival Univision; expanded Spanish-language programming to start at 1 p.m.; and changed call signs to WUNI. At the time, Boston was the only market in the top 20 media markets for Hispanics without a Univision station. General manager Mike Nurse told The Boston Globe, "We actually wanted to be with Univision in the first place."

Hill's broadcast stations were mired in a series of financial issues in the early 1990s that ultimately led to a foreclosure on her two television properties. A November 1993 report in The Washington Post revealed that Corridor Broadcasting had contributed thousands of dollars to Democratic political campaigns but owed the Federal Deposit Insurance Corporation (FDIC) $26 million (equivalent to $57.9 million in 2025). It also detailed ties between Hill and Ron Brown, then the United States Secretary of Commerce (and revealed to be her romantic partner after his death); a company named Harmon International, named after Brown's middle name, leased equipment to Hill for use at WFTY in Washington. The $26 million loan had belonged to Sunbelt Savings & Loan, a Dallas financial institution that failed; the FDIC refused to foreclose on the loan because it did not want to run a TV station.

The FDIC received a $3.1 million (equivalent to $6.91 million in 2025) offer for the failed loan from John and Barbara Foster of Fort Worth, Texas, through their Jasas Corporation. The Fosters specialized in acquiring businesses at foreclosure. They proceeded to foreclose on the note in August 1993 and have WUNI and WFTY transferred to them; they paid Hill to continue managing the stations, an arrangement that later led to investigations by the FDIC inspector general and a House committee as to whether she illegally retained a financial interest after foreclosure. Hill was later indicted in 1998 for siphoning more than $200,000 from Corridor and additional money from related companies, spending the money on shopping expenses; she received a four-month jail sentence in 1999.

Foster came to regret being in business with Hill. In 1993, he told The Post, "We've found a lot more problems than I ever anticipated and a lot more costs. I'm in the thing for substantially more money than I thought it was going to be"; he later told the Fort Worth Star-Telegram, "I wish a thousand times I'd never bought the note." In 1995, he filed to sell WUNI to The Mayan Group, a Dallas firm owned by Dwayne Toler, for $2 million; the transaction was dismissed by the FCC that March. By 1997, WUNI no longer had the newscast but produced three local programs: the public affairs series Enfoque Latino; Fútbol MLS, a weekly show on Major League Soccer; and a music program, Pachanga Latina.

=== Sale to Entravision ===
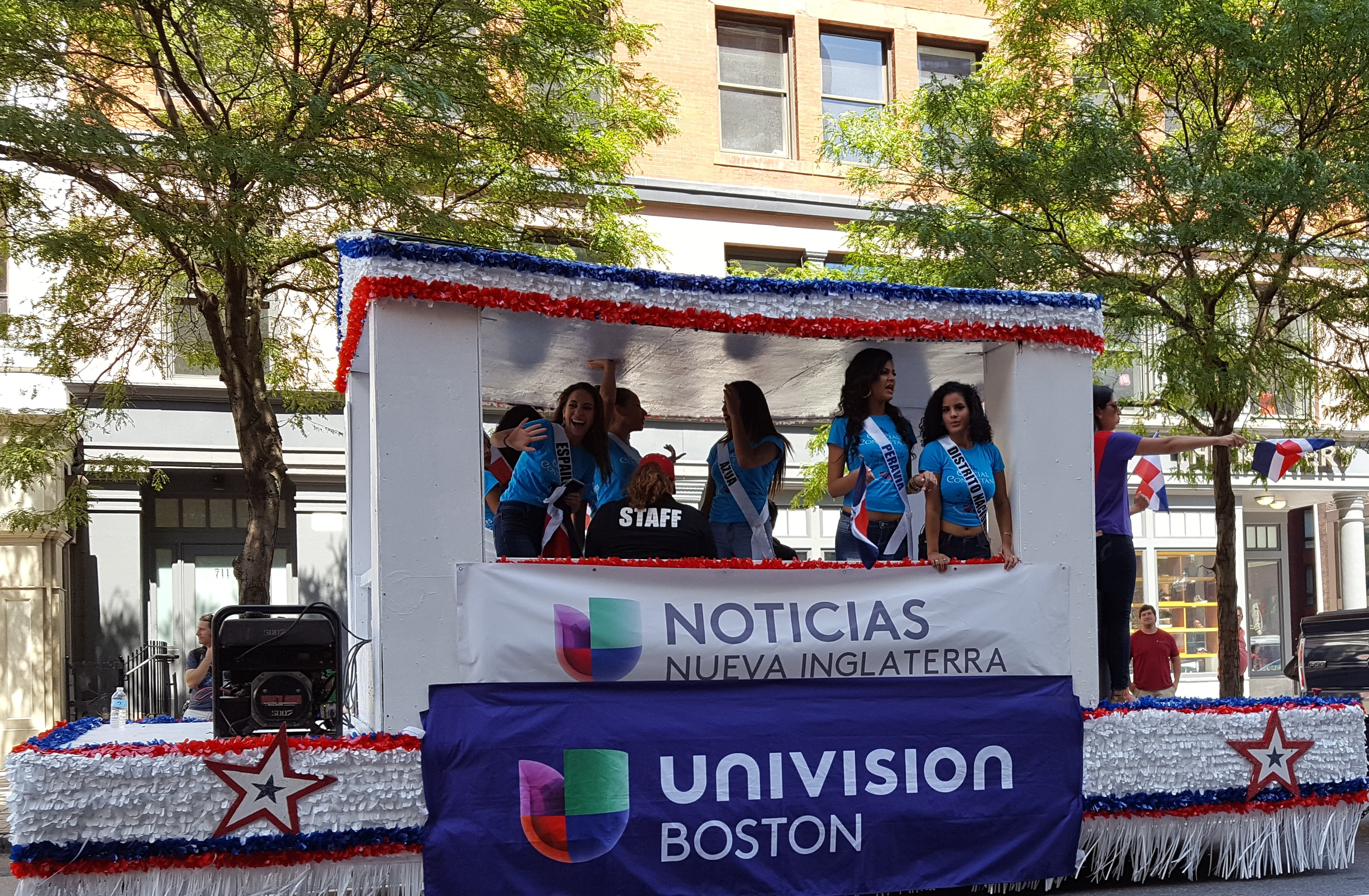
A Univision Boston/Noticias Univision Nueva Inglaterra float at Boston's Dominican Parade in 2016

Jasas announced the sale of WUNI to Entravision Communications in October 2000 for $47.5 million. Univision itself acquired a Boston-market television station, WHUB-TV (channel 66), as part of its purchase of USA Broadcasting. That station became part of the new Telefutura (later UniMás) network on January 14, 2002, as WUTF-TV. That same month, Univision entered into a joint sales agreement with Entravision, whereby Entravision provided local sales and promotional services to the Univision-owned Telefutura stations in six markets: Albuquerque, Boston, Denver, Orlando, Tampa, and Washington, D.C. This agreement was replaced by a new version in 2004. Entravision also acquired the former WHCT in Hartford, Connecticut, changing it to Univision as WUVN and forming a regional cluster.

By 2001, WUNI had plans to relaunch a news department. A weeknight 6 p.m. newscast, Noticias Univisión Nueva Inglaterra, debuted on April 1, 2003. In 2015, Telemundo station WNEU debuted competing local newscasts, including a live 11 p.m. report, something WUNI still did not produce.

=== Switch to UniMás ===
On December 4, 2017, as part of a multi-market realignment, the programming and call signs of WUNI and sister station WUTF-DT (channel 66) were swapped: WUNI and its Univision programming moved to the Univision-owned facility using digital channel 27 and virtual channel 66, while Entravision's digital channel 29 and virtual channel 27 facility became the new home of UniMás affiliate WUTF-TV.

== Technical information ==
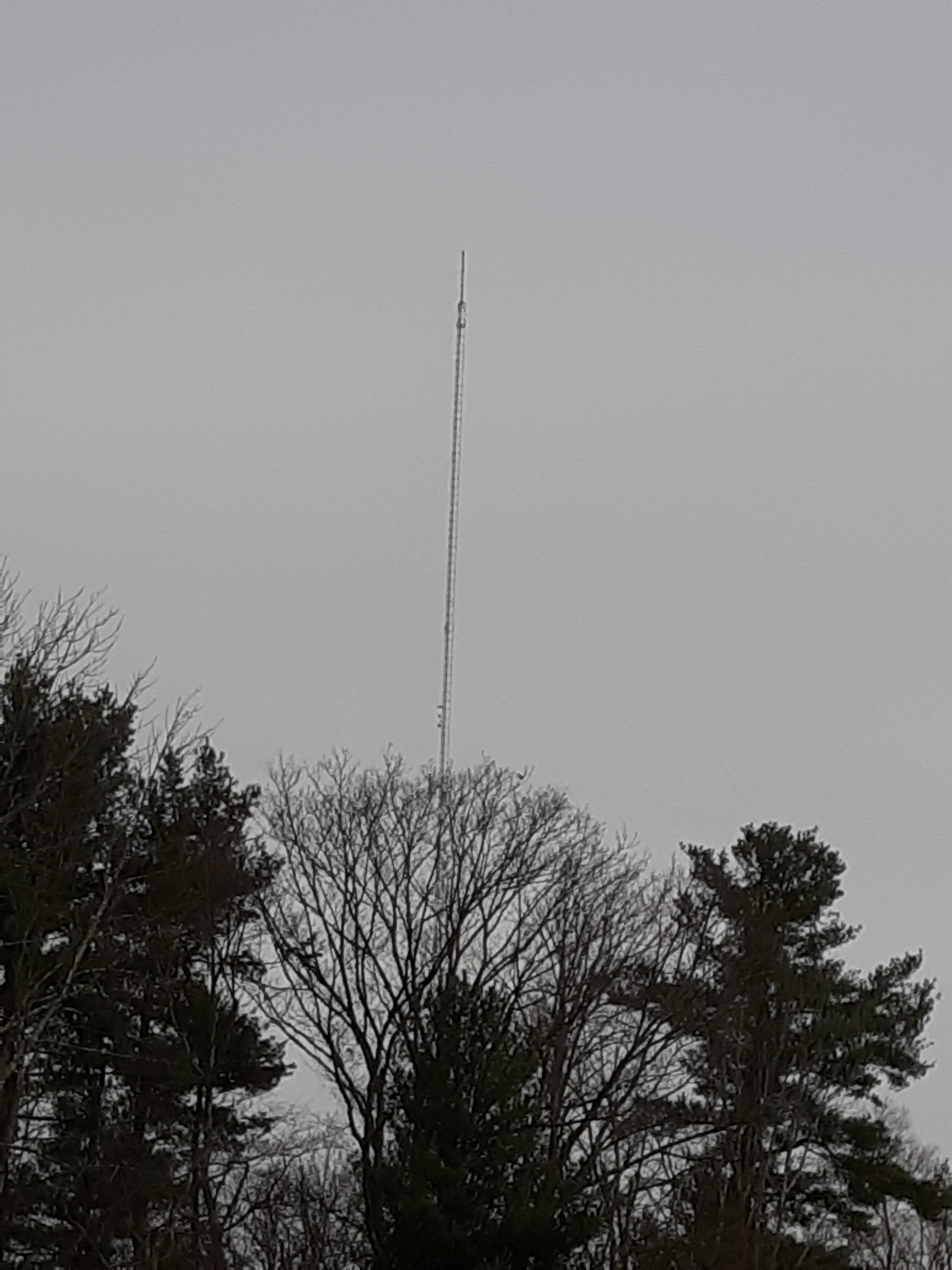
The tower on Stiles Hill in Boylston has broadcast channel 27 since it began broadcasting.

WUTF-TV is broadcast from a tower on Stiles Hill in Boylston, Massachusetts. Its signal is multiplexed:

Subchannels of WUTF-TV
Subchannel	Res.	Short name	Programming
27.1	1080i	UniMas	UniMás
27.2	480i	LATV	LATV
27.3	480i	TheNest	The Nest
27.4	480i	JTV	Jewelry TV

A fire at Stiles Hill prompted the early cessation of analog service from then-WUNI in February 2009. The station's digital signal remained on its pre-transition UHF channel 29, using virtual channel 27. It was repacked to channel 19 in 2019.
