= NHL Radio =

- Other names: NHL Game of the Week
- Genre: Sports
- Country of origin: United States; Canada
- Language: English
- Announcer: See below
- Created by: Westwood One
- Recording studio: The site of the games
- Original release: 1993 – present
- Audio format: Stereophonic sound

NHL Radio is the official national radio broadcaster of the National Hockey League, covering the Stanley Cup Final, both Conference Finals, selected early round playoff action, the All-Star Game, the NHL Winter Classic and a selected number of regular-season games. The package was distributed by Westwood One and premiered in the 1993-94 season. This arrangement lasted through the end of the 2007-08 season until it was relaunched for the 2016 Stanley Cup Final, through the network's NBC Sports Radio service. The contract was continued for the 2016-17 season with a playoff game of the week, both conference finals, the Stanley Cup Final, the Winter Classic and select regular season games being added. The NBC Sports Radio brand was dropped in 2020; Westwood One will syndicate the broadcasts directly. In 2021, Sports USA Radio Network took over the national radio rights to the NHL.

== NHL Radio's blackout rules ==
Within 75 miles of a team's home arena, only stations the team or its flagship station contracts with can carry those games, regardless if the team is home or away. Thus, any competing station that carries national broadcasts cannot air those games.

Unlike Westwood One's NFL coverage and other leagues' radio coverage, there have never been any blackout restrictions on internet streaming of NHL games. Also, during the Stanley Cup Final, there is also no requirement that only the 2 participating teams' flagship stations are allowed to carry coverage, as is the case with the NFL during the Super Bowl and Major League Baseball during the World Series; local network affiliates may continue to carry the local broadcast and are not forced to carry the Sports USA feed.

== Commentators ==
Current

- John Ahlers
- Pat Foley
- John Forslund
- Jack Michaels
- Judd Sirott
- Nick Olczyk
- Jim Fox
- Joe Micheletti
- Brian Hayward
- Billy Jaffe

Former

- Kenny Albert
- Bob Beers
- Brian Boucher
- Roxy Bernstein
- Doug Brown
- Bill Clement
- Greg Dickerson
- Darren Eliot
- Jim Fox
- Ray Ferraro
- Dave Goucher
- Sean Grande
- Steve Goldstein
- Gary Green
- Matt McConnell
- Eddie Olczyk
- Darren Pang
- Howie Rose
- Sam Rosen
- Sherry Ross
- Dan Rusanowsky
- Dave Strader
- Ralph Strangis
- Joe Tolleson
- John Vanbiesbrouck

=== Stanley Cup Finals commentating crews ===
Year	Play-by-play	Color commentator(s)	Ice level reporter
2026	John Forslund	Eddie Olczyk	Billy Jaffe
2025	John Ahlers	Brian Hayward	Billy Jaffe
2024	John Ahlers	Brian Boucher	Billy Jaffe
2023	John Ahlers	Brian Boucher	Billy Jaffe
2022	John Ahlers	Joe Micheletti	Billy Jaffe
2021	John Ahlers	Joe Micheletti	
2020	Kenny Albert (Games 1–4, 6–7); Sam Rosen (Game 5)	Joe Micheletti	
2019	Kenny Albert	Joe Micheletti (Games 1–4, 6–7); Darren Pang (Game 5)	Brian Boucher
2018	Kenny Albert	Joe Micheletti (Games 1–4); Jim Fox (Gm 5)	Ray Ferraro
2017	Kenny Albert	Joe Micheletti	Ray Ferraro
2016	Kenny Albert	Joe Micheletti	Darren Eliot
2008	Sam Rosen	Bill Clement	
2007	Sam Rosen	Darren Pang	
2006	Sam Rosen	Darren Eliot	
2005	Canceled due to 2004–05 NHL lockout.		
2004	Sam Rosen	Eddie Olczyk	
2003	Sam Rosen	Eddie Olczyk	
2002	Sam Rosen	Gary Green and Darren Eliot	
2001	Sam Rosen	Gary Green	
2000	Sam Rosen	Gary Green	
1999	Sam Rosen	Gary Green	
1998	Sam Rosen	Gary Green	Sean Grande
1997	Sam Rosen	Gary Green	Doug Brown and Sean Grande
1996	Sam Rosen	Gary Green	Doug Brown and Sean Grande
1995	Kenny Albert	Gary Green	Doug Brown
1994	Kenny Albert	Sherry Ross	Doug Brown

== See also ==
- National Hockey League on the radio
