= List of Washington Nationals broadcasters =

Broadcasters for the Washington Nationals Major League Baseball team.

== Television ==
=== Current announcers ===
- Dan Kolko, field reporter, 2014–2018, 2021–2025; studio host, 2019–2025; play-by-play announcer, 2026–present
- Kevin Frandsen, primary color commentator and pre-game and post-game commentator, 2022–present
- Ryan Zimmerman, occasional color commentator, 2022–present
- Alexa Datt, studio host and field reporter, 2026–present

=== Former announcers ===
- Mel Proctor, play-by-play, 2005
- Ron Darling, color commentator, 2005
- Kenny Albert, play-by-play, 2005 (when Proctor was unavailable)
- Jack Voigt, color commentator, 2005 (when Darling was unavailable)
- Bob Carpenter, play-by-play announcer, 2006–2025; pre-game and post-game commentator, 2021–2025
- Tom Paciorek, color commentator, 2006
- Don Sutton, color commentator, 2007–2008
- Don Baylor, substitute studio analyst, 2007 (when Ray Knight was unavailable)
- Rob Dibble, color commentator, 2009–2010
- Debbi Taylor, field reporter, 2007–2011
- F. P. Santangelo, color commentator, 2011–2021, pre-game and post-game commentator, 2021
- Kristina Akra, field reporter, 2012
- Julie Alexandria, field reporter, 2013
- Ray Knight, studio analyst, substitute color commentator, 2007–2018
- Johnny Holliday, studio host, substitute play-by-play announcer, 2007–2018
- Phil Wood, substitute studio analyst, 2008–2020
- Michael Morse, substitute studio analyst and substitute color commentator, 2018–2020
- Alex Parker, substitute studio host, 2018–2020
- Carol Maloney, substitute field reporter and substitute studio host, 2019–2020
- Byron Kerr, substitute studio host, 2007–2020
- Bo Porter, studio analyst, 2019–2020
- Drew Goldfarb, sports betting analyst and pregame sports betting segment host, 2021
- Justin Maxwell, substitute studio host, 2019–2020; substitute color commentator, 2021
- Grant Paulsen, substitute color commentator, 2021
- Alex Chappell, field reporter, 2019–2020; substitute pre-game and post-game anchor, 2021
- Mark Zuckerman, substitute pre-game and post-game anchor, 2021
- Paul Mancano, substitute pre-game and post-game anchor, 2021
- Dave Jageler, substitute play-by-play announcer
- Charlie Slowes, substitute play-by-play announcer

=== Broadcast outlets ===
When the Nationals arrived in Washington, D. C., the Mid-Atlantic Sports Network (MASN) acquired the television rights for almost all Nationals games. However, MASN was not available to most people in the Nationals broadcast area for nearly all of the first two seasons of play. Some of the games were also televised on WDCA, mostly on weekends.

While MASN continued to televise nearly every Nationals game, the number of WDCA telecasts decreased to approximately 30 in 2006, mostly on Friday nights. By 2007, the number of over-the-air games was down to approximately 20. MASN's broadcast partner switched from WDCA to WDCW from 2009 to 2012. In 2013, WUSA became MASN's over-the-air broadcast partner for 20 Nationals games a year–all weekend games except for Opening Day. In 2018, over-the-air broadcasts ended, and all games were aired exclusively on MASN unless picked up for national broadcast until the end of the 2025 season. MLB Local Media handles Washington Nationals broadcasts starting with the 2026 season.

== Radio ==
=== Current announcers ===
- Charlie Slowes, 2005–present
- Dave Jageler, 2006–present

=== Former announcers ===
- Kevin Brown (as needed), 2017
- Dave Shea, 2005
- Phil Wood, radio post-game show host, 2008–2019
- Pete Medhurst, 2019

=== Broadcast outlets ===
Since the 2011 season, the Nationals' flagship radio station has been WJFK-FM, "106.7 The Fan", which is owned and operated by Audacy after then-Entercom's purchase of CBS Radio. Most games also are simulcast on WFED, "Federal News Radio," at 1500 and 820 AM, which is owned by Hubbard Broadcasting after its purchase of the station from Bonneville International and was the flagship station of the Nationals from the first season in Washington (2005) through the 2010 season. Whenever WFED cannot air a game due to a conflict, that game airs on WJFK's sister station WJFK (1580 AM, "CBS Sports Radio 1580").

== See also ==
- List of current Major League Baseball broadcasters
- List of Montreal Expos broadcasters
