= 1991–92 Boston Celtics season =

NBA basketball team season

- Division champions
- Head coach: Chris Ford
- General manager: Dave Gavitt
- Owners: Don Gaston; Alan N. Cohen; Paul Dupee
- Arena: Boston Garden; Hartford Civic Center

Results
- Record: 51–31 (.622)
- Place: Division: 1st (Atlantic); Conference: 2nd (Eastern)
- Playoff finish: Conference semifinals (lost to Cavaliers 3–4)
- Stats at Basketball Reference

Local media
- Television: WFXT (Tom Heinsohn, Bob Cousy); SportsChannel New England (Mike Gorman, Tom Heinsohn)
- Radio: WEEI (Glenn Ordway, Doug Brown)

The 1991–92 Boston Celtics season was the 46th season for the Boston Celtics in the National Basketball Association. This also marked the 13th and final NBA season for All-Star forward, and Celtics legend Larry Bird, who would retire after the season.

== Season summary ==
=== Off-season ===
The Celtics had the 24th overall pick in the 1991 NBA draft, and selected small forward Rick Fox from the University of North Carolina.

=== Regular season ===
With the addition of Fox, the Celtics struggled losing four of their first six games of the regular season, but then won 15 of their next 18 games. However, Bird suffered a back injury in January, and only played just 45 games; also during that month, the team traded Brian Shaw to the Miami Heat in exchange for Sherman Douglas. The Celtics held a 28–18 record at the All-Star break, posted a seven-game winning streak between March and April, and won their final eight games of the season. The Celtics won the Atlantic Division title with a 51–31 record, and earned the second seed in the Eastern Conference; the team qualified for the NBA playoffs for the 13th consecutive year.

Bird averaged 20.2 points, 9.6 rebounds and 6.8 assists per game, while Reggie Lewis averaged 20.8 points and 1.5 steals per game. In addition, Robert Parish averaged 14.1 points and 8.9 rebounds per game, and surpassed the 20,000 point mark during the regular season, while sixth man Kevin McHale provided the team with 13.9 points and 5.9 rebounds per game off the bench, but only played 56 games due to a leg injury, Kevin Gamble provided with 13.5 points per game, and second-year guard Dee Brown contributed 11.7 points and 5.3 assists per game, but only played just 31 games due to a knee injury. Meanwhile, Fox contributed 8.0 points per game off the bench, and was named to the NBA All-Rookie Second Team, Ed Pinckney averaged 7.6 points and 7.0 rebounds per game, John Bagley was the team's starting point guard this season, averaging 7.2 points and 6.6 assists per game, and Joe Kleine provided with 4.7 points and 4.3 rebounds per game.

During the NBA All-Star weekend at the Orlando Arena in Orlando, Florida, Bird and Lewis were both selected for the 1992 NBA All-Star Game, as members of the Eastern Conference All-Star team, although Bird did not participate due to injury; it was Bird's final All-Star selection, and the first and only All-Star appearance for Lewis. In addition, Bird was also selected to participate in the NBA Three-Point Shootout, but withdrew due to injury, and was replaced with Dell Curry of the Charlotte Hornets. Bird finished in 14th place in Most Valuable Player voting, while head coach Chris Ford finished tied in seventh place in Coach of the Year voting.

The Celtics finished 16th in the NBA in home-game attendance, with an attendance of 610,776 at the Boston Garden during the regular season.

=== NBA playoffs ===
In the Eastern Conference First Round of the 1992 NBA playoffs, and for the second consecutive year, the Celtics faced off against the 7th–seeded Indiana Pacers, a team that featured Reggie Miller, Chuck Person, and Sixth Man of the Year, Detlef Schrempf. Despite starting the series without Bird and Brown due to injuries, the Celtics won the first two games over the Pacers at home at the Boston Garden, before winning Game 3 on the road, 102–98 at the Market Square Arena to win the series in a three-game sweep.

In the Eastern Conference Semi-finals, the team faced off against the 3rd–seeded Cleveland Cavaliers, who were led by the trio of All-Star center Brad Daugherty, All-Star guard Mark Price, and Larry Nance. Despite the Celtics winning the Atlantic Division title, the Cavaliers had home-court advantage in the series, since they finished with a better regular-season record. The Celtics lost Game 1 to the Cavaliers on the road, 101–76 at the Coliseum at Richfield, but managed to win the next two games, including a Game 3 home win at the Boston Garden, 110–107 to take a 2–1 series lead. Bird returned to play in Game 4, in which the Celtics lost to the Cavaliers at home in overtime, 114–112. After trailing 3–2 in the series, the Celtics won Game 6 over the Cavaliers at the Boston Garden, 122–91 to even the series. However, the Celtics lost Game 7 to the Cavaliers at the Coliseum at Richfield, 122–104, thus losing in a hard-fought seven-game series.

=== Notable highlights ===
One notable highlight of the regular season occurred on March 15, 1992, in which the Celtics defeated the Portland Trail Blazers at home in double-overtime, 152–148 at the Boston Garden. Bird finished with a triple-double of 49 points, 14 rebounds and 12 assists in a nationally televised game; it was the most points for Bird since February 15, 1988, when he scored 49 against the Phoenix Suns.

=== Aftermath ===
Following their loss to the Cavaliers, the Celtics would not win an NBA playoff series again for another ten years.

== Draft picks ==
| Round | Pick | Player | Position | Nationality | College |
|---|---|---|---|---|---|
| 1 | 24 | Rick Fox | SF | Canada | North Carolina |

== Roster ==
1991–92 Boston Celtics roster
Players

| Pos. | No. | Player | Height | Weight | DOB | From |
|---|---|---|---|---|---|---|
| PG | 5 | John Bagley | 6 ft 0 in (1.83 m) | 185 lb (84 kg) | 1960–04–23 | Boston College |
| SF | 8 | Kenny Battle | 6 ft 6 in (1.98 m) | 210 lb (95 kg) | 1964–10–10 | Illinois |
| PF | 33 | Larry Bird | 6 ft 9 in (2.06 m) | 220 lb (100 kg) | 1956–12–07 | Indiana State |
| PG | 7 | Dee Brown | 6 ft 1 in (1.85 m) | 160 lb (73 kg) | 1968–11–29 | Jacksonville |
| PG | 20 | Sherman Douglas | 6 ft 0 in (1.83 m) | 160 lb (73 kg) | 1966–09–15 | Syracuse |
| SF | 44 | Rick Fox | 6 ft 7 in (2.01 m) | 230 lb (104 kg) | 1969–07–24 | North Carolina |
| SF | 34 | Kevin Gamble | 6 ft 5 in (1.96 m) | 210 lb (95 kg) | 1965–11–13 | Iowa |
| C | 53 | Joe Kleine | 6 ft 11 in (2.11 m) | 255 lb (116 kg) | 1962–01–04 | Arkansas |
| SG | 35 | Reggie Lewis | 6 ft 7 in (2.01 m) | 195 lb (88 kg) | 1965–11–21 | Northeastern |
| PF | 41 | Tony Massenburg | 6 ft 9 in (2.06 m) | 220 lb (100 kg) | 1967–07–31 | Maryland |
| PF | 32 | Kevin McHale | 6 ft 10 in (2.08 m) | 210 lb (95 kg) | 1957–12–19 | Minnesota |
| C | 00 | Robert Parish | 7 ft 0 in (2.13 m) | 230 lb (104 kg) | 1953–08–30 | Centenary |
| PF | 54 | Ed Pinckney | 6 ft 9 in (2.06 m) | 195 lb (88 kg) | 1963–03–27 | Villanova |
| PG | 12 | Kevin Pritchard | 6 ft 3 in (1.91 m) | 180 lb (82 kg) | 1967–07–17 | Kansas |
| SG | 4 | Larry Robinson | 6 ft 3 in (1.91 m) | 180 lb (82 kg) | 1968–01–11 | Centenary |
| C | 52 | Stojko Vranković | 7 ft 2 in (2.18 m) | 260 lb (118 kg) | 1964–01–22 | Croatia |

Coaches
Head coach
- Chris Ford
Assistant(s)
- Don Casey
- Jon Jennings
- Ed Lacerte (trainer)

Legend
- (DP) Unsigned draft pick
- (FA) Free agent
- (S) Suspended
- Injured

Roster
Updated: March 23, 1992

== Regular season ==
=== Season standings ===
| Atlantic Division | W | L | PCT | GB | Home | Road | Div |
|---|---|---|---|---|---|---|---|
| y-Boston Celtics | 51 | 31 | .622 | — | 34–7 | 17–24 | 19–9 |
| x-New York Knicks | 51 | 31 | .622 | — | 30–11 | 21–20 | 20–8 |
| x-New Jersey Nets | 40 | 42 | .488 | 11 | 25–16 | 15–26 | 15–13 |
| x-Miami Heat | 38 | 44 | .463 | 13 | 28–13 | 10–31 | 14–14 |
| Philadelphia 76ers | 35 | 47 | .427 | 16 | 23–18 | 12–29 | 15–13 |
| Washington Bullets | 25 | 57 | .305 | 26 | 14–27 | 11–30 | 7–21 |
| Orlando Magic | 21 | 61 | .256 | 30 | 13–28 | 8–33 | 8–20 |

y – clinched division title
x – clinched playoff spot

| # | Eastern Conference | | | | |
| # | Team | W | L | PCT | GB |
|---|---|---|---|---|---|
| 1 | z-Chicago Bulls | 67 | 15 | .817 | – |
| 2 | y-Boston Celtics | 51 | 31 | .622 | 16 |
| 3 | x-Cleveland Cavaliers | 57 | 25 | .695 | 10 |
| 4 | x-New York Knicks | 51 | 31 | .622 | 16 |
| 5 | x-Detroit Pistons | 48 | 34 | .585 | 19 |
| 6 | x-New Jersey Nets | 40 | 42 | .488 | 27 |
| 7 | x-Indiana Pacers | 40 | 42 | .488 | 27 |
| 8 | x-Miami Heat | 38 | 44 | .463 | 29 |
| 9 | Atlanta Hawks | 38 | 44 | .463 | 29 |
| 10 | Philadelphia 76ers | 35 | 47 | .427 | 32 |
| 11 | Milwaukee Bucks | 31 | 51 | .378 | 36 |
| 12 | Charlotte Hornets | 31 | 51 | .378 | 36 |
| 13 | Washington Bullets | 25 | 57 | .305 | 42 |
| 14 | Orlando Magic | 21 | 61 | .256 | 46 |

z – clinched division title
y – clinched division title
x – clinched playoff spot

== Playoffs ==
1992 playoff game log
First round: 3–0 (home: 2–0; road: 1–0)

| Game | Date | Team | Score | High points | High rebounds | High assists | Location Attendance | Series |
|---|---|---|---|---|---|---|---|---|
| 1 | April 23 | Indiana | W 124–113 | Reggie Lewis (32) | Robert Parish (14) | John Bagley (9) | Boston Garden; 14,890 | 1–0 |
| 2 | April 25 | Indiana | W 119–112 (OT) | John Bagley (35) | Robert Parish (14) | John Bagley (15) | Boston Garden; 14,890 | 2–0 |
| 3 | April 27 | @ Indiana | W 102–98 | Reggie Lewis (32) | Ed Pinckney (14) | John Bagley (11) | Market Square Arena; 16,530 | 3–0 |

Conference Semi-finals: 3–4 (home: 2–1; road: 1–3)

| Game | Date | Team | Score | High points | High rebounds | High assists | Location Attendance | Series |
|---|---|---|---|---|---|---|---|---|
| 1 | May 2 | @ Cleveland | L 76–101 | Kevin Gamble (22) | Ed Pinckney (10) | John Bagley (8) | Richfield Coliseum; 17,496 | 0–1 |
| 2 | May 4 | @ Cleveland | W 104–98 | Robert Parish (27) | Robert Parish (8) | John Bagley (11) | Richfield Coliseum; 20,273 | 1–1 |
| 3 | May 8 | Cleveland | W 110–107 | Reggie Lewis (36) | Robert Parish (17) | Reggie Lewis (7) | Boston Garden; 14,890 | 2–1 |
| 4 | May 10 | Cleveland | L 112–114 (OT) | Reggie Lewis (42) | Robert Parish (18) | John Bagley (7) | Boston Garden; 14,890 | 2–2 |
| 5 | May 13 | @ Cleveland | L 98–114 | Reggie Lewis (27) | Joe Kleine (11) | John Bagley (5) | Richfield Coliseum; 20,273 | 2–3 |
| 6 | May 15 | Cleveland | W 122–91 | Reggie Lewis (26) | Dee Brown (8) | Larry Bird (14) | Boston Garden; 14,890 | 3–3 |
| 7 | May 17 | @ Cleveland | L 104–122 | Reggie Lewis (22) | Ed Pinckney (9) | Bagley, Brown (5) | Richfield Coliseum; 20,273 | 3–4 |

1992 schedule

== Player statistics ==
Legend
| GP | Games played | GS | Games started | MPG | Minutes per game |
| FG% | Field-goal percentage | 3P% | 3-point field-goal percentage | FT% | Free-throw percentage |
| RPG | Rebounds per game | APG | Assists per game | SPG | Steals per game |
| BPG | Blocks per game | PPG | Points per game |

=== Regular season ===
Boston Celtics statistics
| Player | GP | GS | MPG | FG% | 3P% | FT% | RPG | APG | SPG | BPG | PPG |
|---|---|---|---|---|---|---|---|---|---|---|---|
| John Bagley | 73 | 59 | 23.9 | .441 | .238 | .716 | 2.2 | 6.6 | .8 | .1 | 7.2 |
| Kenny Battle^{†} | 8 | 0 | 5.8 | .750 | | 1.000 | 1.1 | .0 | .1 | .0 | 1.8 |
| Larry Bird | 45 | 45 | 36.9 | .466 | .406 | .926 | 9.6 | 6.8 | .9 | .7 | 20.2 |
| Dee Brown | 31 | 20 | 28.5 | .426 | .227 | .769 | 2.5 | 5.3 | 1.1 | .2 | 11.7 |
| Sherman Douglas^{†} | 37 | 0 | 17.7 | .455 | .111 | .680 | 1.5 | 4.1 | .6 | .2 | 7.3 |
| Rick Fox | 81 | 5 | 19.0 | .459 | .329 | .755 | 2.7 | 1.6 | 1.0 | .4 | 8.0 |
| Kevin Gamble | 82 | 77 | 30.4 | .529 | .290 | .885 | 3.5 | 2.7 | .9 | .5 | 13.5 |
| Rickey Green | 26 | 0 | 14.1 | .447 | .250 | .722 | .9 | 2.6 | .7 | .0 | 4.1 |
| Joe Kleine | 70 | 3 | 14.2 | .491 | .500 | .708 | 4.2 | .5 | .3 | .2 | 4.7 |
| Reggie Lewis | 82 | 82 | 37.4 | .503 | .238 | .851 | 4.8 | 2.3 | 1.5 | 1.3 | 20.8 |
| Tony Massenburg^{†} | 7 | 0 | 6.6 | .444 | | .500 | 1.3 | .0 | .0 | .1 | 1.4 |
| Kevin McHale | 56 | 1 | 25.0 | .509 | .000 | .822 | 5.9 | 1.5 | .2 | 1.1 | 13.9 |
| Robert Parish | 79 | 79 | 28.9 | .535 | | .772 | 8.9 | .9 | .9 | 1.2 | 14.1 |
| Ed Pinckney | 81 | 36 | 23.7 | .537 | .000 | .812 | 7.0 | .8 | .9 | .7 | 7.6 |
| Kevin Pritchard | 11 | 0 | 12.4 | .471 | .000 | .778 | 1.0 | 2.7 | .3 | .4 | 4.2 |
| Larry Robinson | 1 | 0 | 6.0 | .200 | | | 2.0 | 1.0 | .0 | .0 | 2.0 |
| Brian Shaw^{†} | 17 | 3 | 25.6 | .427 | .000 | .875 | 4.1 | 5.2 | .7 | .6 | 10.3 |
| Stojko Vranković | 19 | 0 | 5.8 | .469 | | .583 | 1.5 | .3 | .0 | .9 | 1.9 |

=== Playoffs ===
Boston Celtics statistics
| Player | GP | GS | MPG | FG% | 3P% | FT% | RPG | APG | SPG | BPG | PPG |
|---|---|---|---|---|---|---|---|---|---|---|---|
| John Bagley | 10 | 10 | 30.8 | .442 | .250 | .703 | 2.7 | 8.5 | .9 | .1 | 11.1 |
| Larry Bird | 4 | 2 | 26.8 | .500 | .000 | .750 | 4.5 | 5.3 | .3 | .5 | 11.3 |
| Dee Brown | 6 | 0 | 20.0 | .500 | .000 | .667 | 2.0 | 5.2 | .2 | .7 | 8.0 |
| Sherman Douglas | 6 | 0 | 10.8 | .360 | .000 | .500 | .7 | 1.7 | .0 | .0 | 3.2 |
| Rick Fox | 8 | 0 | 8.4 | .478 | .500 | 1.000 | .8 | .5 | .3 | .3 | 3.6 |
| Kevin Gamble | 10 | 10 | 33.5 | .473 | .000 | .800 | 4.2 | 2.3 | 1.2 | .6 | 13.6 |
| Joe Kleine | 9 | 0 | 9.1 | .409 | .000 | 1.000 | 2.4 | .1 | .0 | .1 | 2.2 |
| Reggie Lewis | 10 | 10 | 40.8 | .528 | .333 | .762 | 4.3 | 3.9 | 2.4 | .8 | 28.0 |
| Kevin McHale | 10 | 0 | 30.6 | .516 | .000 | .795 | 6.7 | 1.3 | .5 | .5 | 16.5 |
| Robert Parish | 10 | 10 | 33.5 | .495 | | .714 | 9.7 | 1.4 | .7 | 1.5 | 12.0 |
| Ed Pinckney | 10 | 8 | 31.4 | .603 | .000 | .839 | 8.4 | .7 | 1.2 | .9 | 9.6 |
| Stojko Vranković | 1 | 0 | 3.0 | 1.000 | | | .0 | 1.0 | .0 | .0 | 2.0 |

- ^{†} Denotes player spent time with another team in the season. Stats reflect time with the Celtics only.

Player statistics citation:

== Awards and records ==
- Rick Fox, NBA All-Rookie Team 2nd Team
