= Kevin Frandsen =

American baseball player (born 1982)

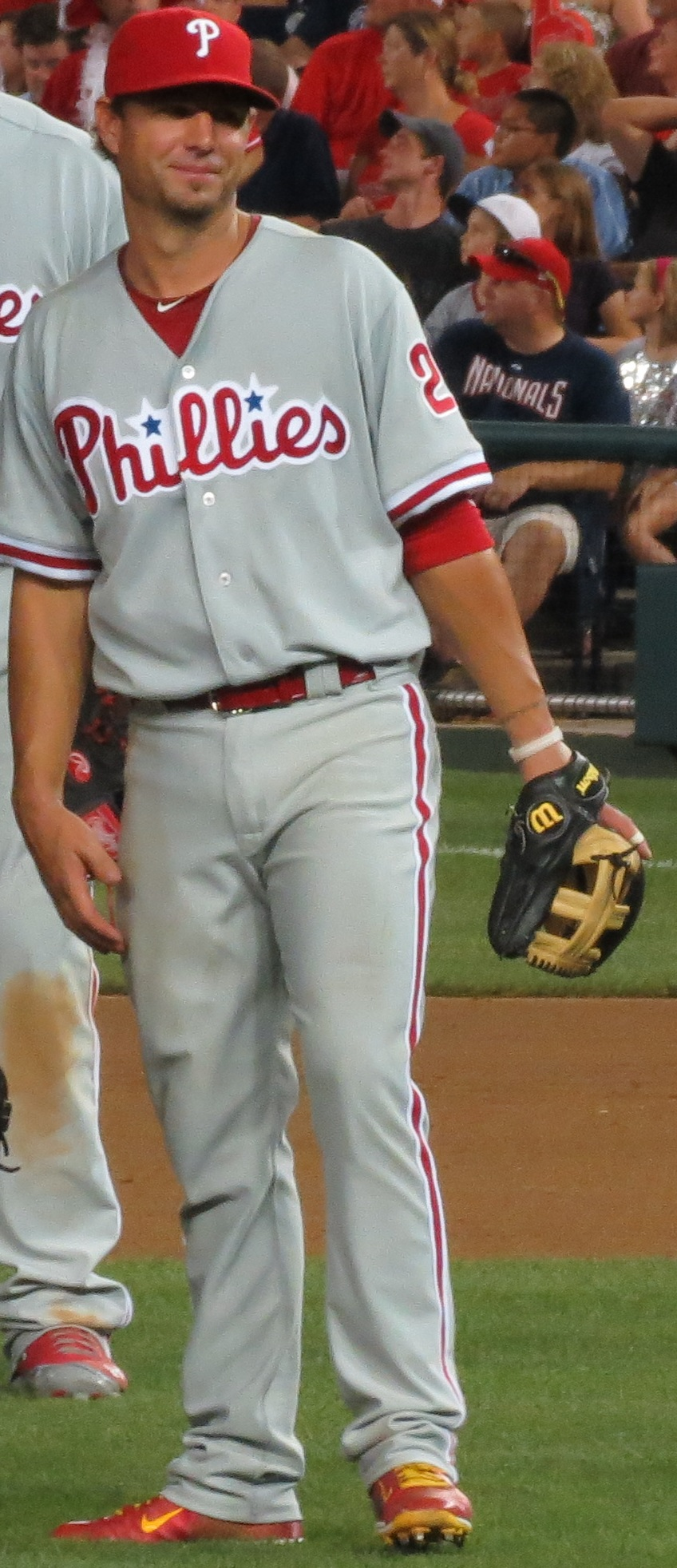
- Frandsen with the Philadelphia Phillies in 2012
- Infielder
- Born: May 24, 1982 (age 44); Los Gatos, California, U.S.
- Batted: Right Threw: Right

MLB debut
- April 28, 2006, for the San Francisco Giants

Last MLB appearance
- October 3, 2015, for the San Francisco Giants

MLB statistics
- Batting average: .258
- Home runs: 15
- Runs batted in: 110
- Stats at Baseball Reference

Teams
- San Francisco Giants (2006–2009); Los Angeles Angels of Anaheim (2010); Philadelphia Phillies (2012–2013); Washington Nationals (2014); San Francisco Giants (2015)

Kevin Vincent Frandsen (born May 24, 1982) is an American sports broadcaster and former professional baseball utility player. Frandsen played in Major League Baseball (MLB) for the San Francisco Giants, Los Angeles Angels of Anaheim, Philadelphia Phillies, and Washington Nationals. He has provided television color commentary for the Nationals since the 2022 season.

== Playing career ==
=== College ===
Born in Los Gatos, California, Frandsen graduated from Bellarmine College Preparatory in San Jose, California, and later attended San José State University, playing for the Spartans and leaving the school as its all-time leader in hits. Frandsen is one of 28 graduates from Bellarmine to play professional baseball. Frandsen was inducted into San Jose State's Hall of Fame in 2014.

=== San Francisco Giants ===
He was drafted by the San Francisco Giants in the 12th round (370th overall) of the 2004 Major League Baseball draft and made his Major League debut with the Giants on April 28, 2006. Frandsen hit his first Major League home run on August 17, 2006, against the Padres at Petco Park.

On May 13, 2007, Frandsen, playing 2nd base, assisted on Omar Vizquel's MLB record setting 1,591st double play. On September 21, 2007, Frandsen became the most recent player on the San Francisco Giants to get five base hits in a single game.

In March 2008, the San Francisco Giants confirmed that Frandsen ruptured his left Achilles tendon, which forced him to miss nearly the entire season. Frandsen was activated before the final game of the season; he had his only at-bat as a pinch hitter and made an out.

Frandsen participated in the Arizona Fall League in 2005, 2006 and 2008.

During the Giants' 2009 spring training camp Frandsen competed with Emmanuel Burriss for the starting second baseman position; Burriss was named the starter on April 1, 2009, and Frandsen was sent to the Triple-A Fresno Grizzlies. Later in the year, May 17, 2009, Frandsen was called up as Juan Uribe was placed on the bereavement list.

=== Boston Red Sox ===
Just prior to the 2010 season, Frandsen was dealt to the Boston Red Sox for a player to be named later and cash considerations.

On March 29, he was optioned to the Red Sox's Triple-A Affiliate, the Pawtucket Red Sox, along with catcher Dusty Brown. He was designated for assignment on April 28.

=== Los Angeles Angels of Anaheim ===
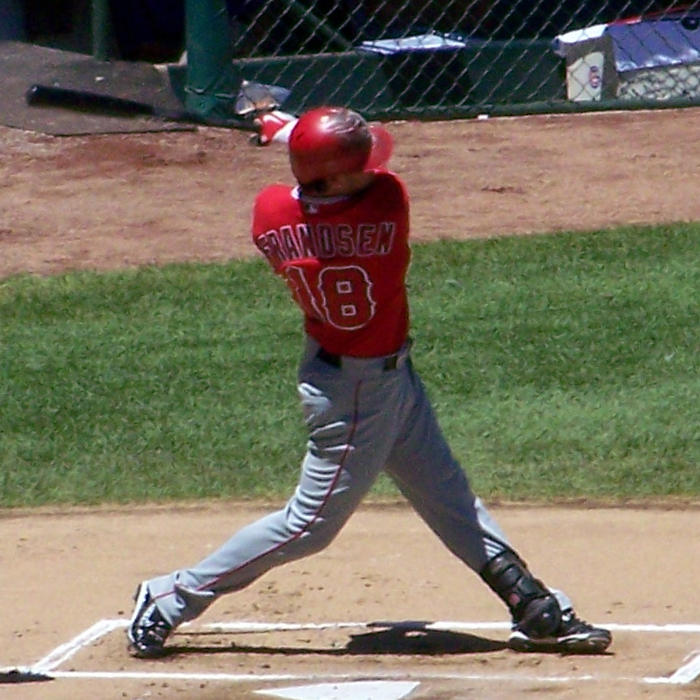
Frandsen batting for the Los Angeles Angels of Anaheim in 2010.

On April 29, 2010, Frandsen was acquired off waivers by the Los Angeles Angels of Anaheim. He was added to the active roster, mainly playing third base to help the team deal with injuries to Maicer Izturis and Brandon Wood.

After the 2010 season, the Angels non-tendered Frandsen, making him a free agent.

=== San Diego Padres ===
On January 5, 2011, Frandsen signed a minor-league contract with the San Diego Padres. He was released on March 25.

=== Philadelphia Phillies ===
Three days after his release from the Padres, Frandsen signed a minor league contract with the Philadelphia Phillies. He spent the 2011 season with the Lehigh Valley IronPigs, the Phillies' Triple-A affiliate. After spending the first four months of the 2012 season in Lehigh Valley, he was placed on the Phillies' 25-man active roster on July 27 following Plácido Polanco's move to the disabled list. Frandsen played in 55 games for Philadelphia in 2012, including 49 starts at third base, batting .338 with 10 doubles and 2 home runs in 195 at-bats. In November, he agreed to an $850,000 contract for 2013, avoiding arbitration.

On May 26, 2013, Frandsen was ejected by umpire Mike Winters for arguing a swinging strike call. It was Frandsen's first career MLB ejection. On June 22, Frandsen hit his first career walk-off home run, a blast off the facade of the upper deck in left field, giving the Phillies a win over the New York Mets. He led MLB with 14 pinch hits in 2013, batting .250 with one home run and 10 RBIs as a pinch hitter. In 119 games, he hit .234 with 5 home runs.

On December 2, 2013, Frandsen signed one-year contract with Philadelphia that would pay him $900,000 in 2014, again avoiding arbitration. He was outrighted off the roster on March 23, 2014 and elected for free agency on March 25.

=== Washington Nationals ===
Frandsen signed with the Washington Nationals on March 26, 2014. He slashed .259/.299/.309 and was one of the Nationals' least valuable players, according to Baseball Reference's wins above replacement statistic. The Nationals released him on April 1, 2015.

=== Arizona Diamondbacks ===
Frandsen signed a minor league deal with the Arizona Diamondbacks on April 21, 2015. He was released on May 30.

=== San Francisco Giants (second stint) ===
Frandsen signed a minor league deal for another stint with the San Francisco Giants on May 31, 2015. On September 23, he was called up to the majors to replace Ehire Adrianza after the latter had suffered a concussion. In 7 games, he batted 2-for-11 for the Giants.

== Post-playing career ==
When Frandsen did not receive an invitation to spring training in 2016, he realized his baseball career was coming to an end. On August 8, 2016, he started co-hosting a morning sports talk radio show on KNBR 1050 called "The Audible". On August 14, 2017, he began co-hosting "KNBR Tonight" on KNBR 680.

Frandsen coached a year of high school baseball along with his former college coach Sam Piraro at Willow Glen High School in San Jose, California. That year, he helped coach them to a CCS Championship.

In January 2018, it was announced that Frandsen would be serving as a part-time color analyst for the Philadelphia Phillies Radio Network during the 2018 season. In December 2018, it was announced that Frandsen's radio role would expand to calling half the Phillies' games per season alongside play-by-play announcer Scott Franzke.

In January 2022, the Washington Nationals announced that Frandsen would join the MASN broadcast team and provide color commentary for Nationals TV coverage, along with veteran announcer Bob Carpenter. After Carpenter retired, he continued broadcasting with Dan Kolko.

== Personal life ==
Frandsen, with family and friends, started and runs the "19 For Life" Foundation "...to fund off-site recreational activities for children coping with serious illness at Lucile Packard Children's Hospital; scholarships for local high school athletes who have overcome illness and adversity; and Bellarmine seniors needing financial assistance to complete their high school education."

In 2007, Frandsen completed the two courses he needed for graduation and earned a degree in finance from San José State University.
