= Dan Kolko =

American sportscaster and journalist

- Born: Silver Spring, Maryland, U.S.
- Sports commentary career
- Team: Washington Nationals
- Genre(s): Sideline reporter and play-by-play
- Sport: Baseball

Dan Kolko is an American journalist and sports commentator for the Washington Nationals of Major League Baseball (MLB). He provides play-by-play commentary on Nationals television broadcasts. He has also worked as a sports reporter covering the Nationals and the Baltimore Ravens of the National Football League (NFL).

== Early life and education ==
Kolko grew up in Silver Spring, Maryland, an inner suburb of Washington, D.C. Although "obsessed" with sports as a boy, by his own recollection, he wasn't particularly strong or athletic, leading him to explore other pathways to being involved in professional sports.

Kolko attended and played tennis at Albert Einstein High School. He went on to attend the University of Delaware, where he became involved in sports broadcasting, providing commentary on Delaware Fightin' Blue Hens games. He graduated from Delaware in 2007 with a bachelor's degree in communication.

== Career ==
=== Professional sports reporting and broadcasting ===
After graduating, Kolko worked in sports journalism. He was hired by the Mid-Atlantic Sports Network (MASN) to cover the Baltimore Ravens in 2008. He moved to the Washington Nationals beat in 2012. Kolko worked as MASN's Nationals beat reporter for three seasons before joining the network's broadcast team as an on-field reporter, still primarily covering the Nationals and occasionally contributing to MLB Network as a Nationals correspondent. He shifted to a studio role beginning with the 2019 season, hosting a pre- and postgame show called Nats Xtra with former MLB player and coach Bo Porter. The Nationals won the World Series that year. Kolko and Porter's reactions to big postseason moments, while watching from MASN's studios, were recorded and later aired in a documentary about Washington's championship run, Improbable, which MASN aired in 2020.

MASN fired Kolko and Porter amidst a round of layoffs at the network before the 2021 season, over the Nationals' objections. The Nationals hired Kolko directly to keep him on the broadcast team, an unusual arrangement between a team and its broadcaster. As longtime play-by-play announcer Bob Carpenter scaled down his commitments in his last few years covering the Nationals, before retiring at the end of the 2025 season, Kolko increasingly stepped in for Carpenter on MASN broadcasts. Kolko also continued to appear occasionally on MLB Network and MLB Network Radio.

The Nationals and MLB Local Media announced a new television broadcast partnership ahead of the 2026 season. Kolko now serves as play-by-play commentator on Nationals.TV, the team's new channel.

Kolko has also hosted several podcasts about the Nationals, including Between Innings with Dan Kolko, Nats Insider, and—alongside former Nationals star Ryan Zimmerman—The 11th Inning with Kolko & Zim.

=== Other work ===
Outside of his baseball commentary, Kolko has appeared as a college basketball commentator for FOX Sports. He has also appeared in television commercials, including as a "host" in regional commercials for Toyota in 2013, with then-Nationals players Bryce Harper and Stephen Strasburg.

== Personal life ==
Kolko lives in the Navy Yard neighborhood of Washington, D.C., with his wife, Aly.

As a University of Delaware alumnus and former Blue Hens sports commentator, Kolko has remained a Delaware fan. He was inducted into the Greater Washington Jewish Sports Hall of Fame in 2025.

== See also ==
- List of Washington Nationals broadcasters
