= Abby Chin =

American sports journalist (born 1982)

- Born: Abigail Chin; 1982; United States
- Education: University of Colorado Boulder
- Occupations: Sports journalist, television reporter
- Years active: 2000s–present
- Employer: NBC Sports Boston
- Known for: Boston Celtics courtside reporter and host
- Spouse: Mike Schmidt
- Children: 2

Abby Chin (born 1982) is an American sports journalist. She is a Boston Celtics basketball pregame and postgame reporter, as well as a court-side reporter. Chin also has covered major events for national networks, including the 2018 Winter Olympics in Pyeongchang on NBC and NBA Summer League on NBA TV. She actively fights for gender and ethnicity inclusion in sports and identifies as Asian American.

== Early life and education ==
Chin grew up in Denver, Colorado and studied broadcasting at the University of Colorado Boulder. Following graduation in 2003, she worked as a production assistant at ESPN and later interned in Colorado sports radio and television.

== Career ==
For a time, Chin worked for local television stations in Alabama and then CSN Northwest in Portland, Oregon. In January 2013, she began working as the Celtics court-side reporter, replacing Greg Dickerson. At the end of the 2019-20 season, Chin was laid off from her role as sideline reporter, igniting an online petition with over 1600 signatures to re-hire her. She returned to Celtics for the 2020–21 season after Kyle Draper left to become the play-by-play announcer for the Sacramento Kings.

In March 2025, Chin was joined by sportswriter Jackie MacMullan and Connecticut Sun player Diamond DeShields for the second-ever all-female Celtics telecast in celebration of Women's History Month.

== Personal life ==
She is married to Mike Schmidt, a software engineer, and has two children, Mabel and Silas.
