= Willie Maye =

Willie Maye (born January 10, 1961, in Greenville, North Carolina) is a former sportscaster serving as the in-arena host for the Boston Celtics.

Maye started his broadcasting career in 1981 at WCAS. In 1984, he joined WILD as a sports anchor and the co-host of the morning show. In 1994, he joined SportsChannel New England as the studio host for Boston Celtics games. In 1996, he was reassigned to the position of courtside reporter. He was replaced by Greg Dickerson in 2005, but remained with the Celtics as an in-arena personality.
