= Mel Proctor =

American sportscaster, author and actor

- Born: Melbourne John Proctor; 1946 (age 79–80); Lakewood, Colorado, U.S.
- Education: Colorado College
- Occupations: Sports announcer; actor; author
- Spouse: Julie
- Children: 2

Mel Proctor (born 1946) is an American television sportscaster, actor, and author.

== Biography ==
A Denver, Colorado native, Proctor has called play-by-play for the Texas Rangers, Baltimore Orioles, Washington Nationals, San Diego Padres and Los Angeles Clippers at various points in his career. Proctor has also done radio play-by-play during his career, working for the Washington Bullets and the New Jersey Nets in the 1980s. He has also worked at various times for networks such as NBC, CBS, and TNT calling events including the NFL, college football, college basketball, and pro boxing. While serving as the Orioles' broadcaster, Proctor appeared in five episodes of Homicide: Life on the Street, between 1993 and 1995, playing fictional reporter Grant Besser.

Mel Proctor did the play-by-play for the Washington Bullets basketball games on Home Team Sports with Phil Chenier for several years.

Proctor was the play-by-play announcer for the Washington Nationals in the team's first season in Washington, D.C., in 2005, teaming with former major-league pitcher Ron Darling on MASN but did not return for 2006.

Proctor operates a media training business for athletes and broadcasters.

In 2016, Proctor's book, The Little General, the Baseball Life of Gene Mauch, was published by Blue River Press. It is available at Barnes & Noble and on Amazon. This is Proctor's third book. I Love the Work But I Hate the Business was also published by Blue River Press in 2013. His first was The Official Fan's Guide to The Fugitive.

He also called Hawaii Rainbow Warrior baseball road games in place of usual announcer Don Robbs. Proctor was replaced by Scott Galetti in 2018 following Robbs’ retirement in 2016.

=== Personal life ===
Proctor has been described as playing practical jokes in the broadcast booth.

== See also ==
- List of Washington Nationals broadcasters
