= Len Berman =

American sports journalist (born 1947)

- Born: Leonard Berman; June 14, 1947 (age 79); New York City, U.S.
- Education: Stuyvesant High School, New York; Syracuse University (BA, MS)
- Occupations: Television journalist; sports radio host
- Agent: IMG
- Notable credit(s): WNBC-TV sports anchor, (1982–2009); WOR host, (2015–present)
- Spouse: Jill Berman (m. 1970)
- Children: 3

Leonard Berman (born June 14, 1947) is an American television sportscaster and journalist who is based in New York City. He is currently hosting the morning show on WOR along with Michael Riedel.

Berman is widely known for his television career with NBC, specifically his work for the network's flagship station WNBC-TV. Berman spent 27 years as the lead sports anchor for WNBC and also worked for NBC Sports covering Major League Baseball and the National Football League. He was employed by WNBC until 2009, and prior to that he worked for WCBS-TV in New York City from April 1979 through August 1982 and WBZ-TV in Boston, where he announced Boston Celtics games on TV with Celtics legend Bob Cousy. He also worked at HBO Sports covering boxing, college basketball and a weekly baseball show Race for the Pennant from 1978 to 1981.

== Early life ==
Berman graduated from the Syracuse University's S. I. Newhouse School of Public Communications in 1968. He also earned a master's degree there in 1970. While at Syracuse, he was the sports director at WAER calling Syracuse Orange games. In 2018, he was inducted into WAER Hall of Fame along with Steve Kroft. In 2026, he was awarded the Newhouse School's Marty Glickman Award for Leadership in Sports Media.

Berman grew up an avid New York Yankees fan. He is partial to Big East basketball. Berman also called the conference's basketball games for ESPN and in syndication for the Big East Network.

== Career ==
On March 1, 2012, Berman hosted a segment on the 10 o'clock news evening sports report on WNYW—Fox 5—in New York City. He presented his top-5 most interesting sports stories of the week prior.

In March 2015, Berman co-hosted a morning radio program from 6:00 a.m. to 10:00am on WOR. The flagship news-talk station for iHeart Radio, originally named "Len and Todd in the Morning".

On October 20, 2017, Berman announced during a broadcast that Todd Schnitt was no longer working at the station because he could not come to terms on a contract. The show is now called "Len Berman and Michael Riedel in the Morning."

Berman announced his last WNBC's sportscast on Wednesday April 22, 2009. Following the announcement, the station showed taped goodbye and good luck messages from Matt Lauer, Al Roker, and Brian Williams.

From 2008 to 2015, Berman wrote a daily blog and newsletter, "Len Berman Sports", at LenBermanSports.com, using the form to continue sharing humorous sports stories.

=== Spanning the World ===
One popular monthly feature Berman responsible for is Spanning the World which aired on WNBC-TV's newscasts and The Today Show. Spanning is a reel of odd and interesting sports highlights from the past month, with a recorded introduction and closing by Don Pardo. When the segment begins, the world is torn in two with the sound of a rooster crowing playing. When the segment ends, the world goes back to its "pre-torn" state. With the same rooster sound, announcer Don Pardo says "Tune in next time for Spanning the World, if there is a next time. I'm Don Pardo." In his last WNBC broadcast, Berman mentioned that the segment would continue on The Today Show. Berman would occasionally do a version of the segment for WNBC titled "Spanning the Week". Thus, would review odd and interesting stories from the past week. A common catchphrase from the segment said by Berman "And nobody got hurt!" after a clip featuring some sort of accident that might have caused injury.

=== Sports on NBC ===
From 1982 to part of 1984, Berman also hosted The NFL on NBC Pregame Show, then known as NFL (insert year), until he was supplanted by Bob Costas. During the early weeks of the 1988 NFL season, Berman served as the host of what was, by that time, called NFL Live! while regular host Costas was hosting NBC's coverage of the 1988 Summer Olympics in Seoul, South Korea. Berman hosted Super Bowl XVII in Pasadena. He also hosted the Baseball Game of the Week for NBC and co-hosted the 1984 World Series.

=== Live at Five ===
In 2005, he was one of a handful of rotating co-anchors with Sue Simmons on Live at Five after Jim Rosenfield left for WCBS-TV.

== Awards ==
He is the winner of eight Emmy Awards and a 6-time New York State Sportscaster of the Year. He has been inducted into the New York State Broadcasters Hall of Fame, the National Jewish Sports Hall of Fame, and the WAER Radio Hall of Fame (Syracuse University).

== Bibliography ==
Berman has written six books and five children's books:

- Spanning the World.
- And Nobody Got Hurt! (Volumes I and II).
- The Greatest Moments in Sports (New York Times Bestseller).
- The 25 Greatest Baseball Players of All Time.
- Greatest Moments in Sports.
- Upsets and Underdogs.

== Personal life ==
Berman resides in Port Washington, New York.

== See also ==
- New Yorkers in journalism
