= National Hockey League on the radio =

Professional ice hockey league

The National Hockey League (NHL), a professional ice hockey league active in the United States and Canada, is broadcast over the radio mainly in its participating countries.

== History ==
=== Canada ===
Radio coverage of the NHL in Canada began on 14 February 1923, when the Toronto Star-owned station CFCA broadcast the third period of a game between the Toronto St. Patricks and the Ottawa Senators from Mutual Street Arena. Norman Albert called the St. Patricks' 6–4 victory using a telephone connection to CFCA's studios. It was the first NHL game broadcast on radio. Six days earlier, Albert had called the third period of an Ontario Hockey Association game between North Toronto and Midland, generally recognized as the first radio play-by-play broadcast of an ice hockey game.

Foster Hewitt made his first hockey broadcast on CFCA on 16 February 1923, calling an OHA game between the Toronto Argonaut Rowing Club and the Kitchener Greenshirts. CFCA subsequently carried the third period of major games from Mutual Street Arena during the remainder of the season, and Hewitt became the station's principal hockey announcer. He continued broadcasting the Toronto club after it was renamed the Toronto Maple Leafs in 1927.

Radio coverage also developed elsewhere in eastern Canada during the 1920s. In March 1924, the CNR Radio station CKCH in Ottawa provided live play-by-play of the Stanley Cup playoff series between the Ottawa Senators and the Montreal Canadiens. The station subsequently carried the Canadiens' Stanley Cup playoff series against the Vancouver Maroons, with broadcasts originating from Montreal's Mount Royal Arena.

In Montreal, station CKAC sought permission to broadcast games from the Montreal Forum in 1925, but the arena's management initially refused. The station instead broadcast Canadiens road games against the Boston Bruins from Massachusetts. CKAC made the first live radio broadcast from the Forum on 7 April 1928, when J.-Arthur Dupont called the second game of the 1928 Stanley Cup Finals between the Montreal Maroons and the New York Rangers. Dupont returned to broadcast the final game of the series on 14 April.

Hockey Night in Canada has its more immediate origins in the General Motors Hockey Broadcast, which began transmitting Saturday-night Maple Leafs games on 12 November 1931 over the Canadian National Railway radio network. The inaugural broadcast covered the opening game at Maple Leaf Gardens. In 1932, the more powerful CFRB replaced CFCA as the programme's Toronto flagship station.

In the 1933–34 NHL season, the CNR's successor, the Canadian Radio Broadcasting Commission (CRBC), began broadcasting Montreal Canadiens and Montreal Maroons games over its Quebec stations. In 1934, Imperial Oil of Canada replaced General Motors Products of Canada as sponsor, and the programme became known as the Imperial Esso Hockey Broadcast. Broadcasts began at 9 p.m. Eastern Time, usually around the beginning of the second period.

Beginning with the 1936–37 NHL season, the games were carried by the CRBC's successor, the Canadian Broadcasting Corporation, and the programme acquired the title Hockey Night in Canada around the same time. In most of Ontario and points west, the broadcast featured the Maple Leafs, with Gordon Calder as host, Hewitt providing play-by-play and former goaltender Percy LeSueur providing colour commentary. The Montreal broadcasts featured Doug Smith and Elmer Ferguson on English-language coverage of Maroons games, while Canadiens games were broadcast in French. After the Maroons folded in 1938, Smith and Ferguson provided English-language broadcasts of Canadiens games. The popularity of the radio programme, particularly Hewitt's broadcasts, made it a natural choice for adaptation to Canadian network television.

CBC Radio carried Saturday-night Hockey Night in Canada broadcasts through the 1964–65 NHL season. It replaced them with Sunday Night NHL Hockey, which aired from the 1965–66 NHL season through the 1975–76 NHL season, after which the network's NHL coverage became exclusively televised. In Toronto, CFRB continued to simulcast Maple Leafs games for many years alongside the CBC's Toronto station, CBL.

Following the end of Sunday Night NHL Hockey in 1976, Canadian terrestrial-radio coverage was primarily provided through the local and regional networks of individual teams rather than a Canadian national package. Nationally syndicated coverage returned in the 1993–94 season through NHL Radio, a North American package distributed by Westwood One. It carried the NHL All-Star Game, selected playoff games and the Stanley Cup Finals. Kenny Albert called the 1994 Stanley Cup Finals between the Rangers and Canucks for the network. The syndicated package continued through the 2008 Stanley Cup Finals, after which there was no national terrestrial-radio broadcast of the Final for eight years.

National audio coverage expanded through satellite radio in the 2000s. The NHL initially divided its satellite rights between Sirius Satellite Radio and XM Satellite Radio, before XM became the league's exclusive satellite-radio carrier in 2007 and began carrying every NHL game during the 2007–08 NHL season. Following the merger of the two services, the coverage continued through SiriusXM Canada. Its service carries the home and away broadcasts of every regular-season and playoff game, while SiriusXM NHL Network Radio provides continuous NHL news, discussion and selected play-by-play.

National terrestrial coverage of the Stanley Cup Final resumed in 2016 through NBC Sports Radio, which was distributed by Westwood One and also made its broadcasts available through SiriusXM and digital audio services. Subsequent national radio packages have principally been produced for the United States but have also been accessible to Canadian listeners through satellite and online distribution.

Rogers also used its Sportsnet Radio stations to distribute Canadian national playoff coverage. During the 2018 Stanley Cup Finals, selected games were carried by the Sportsnet Radio Network through Sportsnet 590 The Fan in Toronto, Sportsnet 960 The Fan in Calgary and Sportsnet 650 in Vancouver. In 2020, the network carried the Vancouver Canucks' second-round playoff series against the Vegas Golden Knights nationally and broadcast every game of the Stanley Cup Final, with Brendan Batchelor providing play-by-play and Corey Hirsch serving as analyst.

=== United States ===
During the 1930s, thanks to the powerful 50,000-watt transmitters of CBC Radio, the CBC's Hockey Night In Canada radio broadcasts became quite popular in much of the northern United States, especially in Boston, Chicago, Detroit, and New York City, the four U.S. cities that had NHL teams after 1924, but also in cities with minor-league or major collegiate hockey teams. Since most local radio coverage of U.S.-based NHL clubs was restricted to home games in those days, whenever Toronto hosted a U.S.-based team, many listeners in the home city of the visiting U.S.-based team would tune in. It has been claimed that during the late 1930s, Hockey Night In Canada was the most popular Saturday-night radio show during the fall and winter months in much of the northern United States.

National radio coverage of the NHL in the United States has been considerably spotty and/or sparse. Perhaps, the first example of national radio network coverage of the National Hockey League in the United States was in 1935–36, when Mutual broadcast some Chicago Black Hawks games. Mutual would follow this up by broadcasting Wednesday night New York Rangers home games in early 1956. Only some stations broadcast these games.

Network coverage would finally resume in 1981, when Enterprise Radio broadcast the Stanley Cup Final. However, Enterprise Radio folded up shop shortly thereafter.

In 1989, the NHL signed a two-year contract (lasting through the 1990–91 season) with ABC Radio for the broadcast rights to the All-Star Game and Stanley Cup Final. ABC Radio named Don Chevrier and Phil Esposito as their main commentating crew.

In 1992, national coverage of the All-Star Game and Stanley Cup Playoffs were broadcast on Star Broadcasting. One year later, the Global Sports Network obtained the national radio broadcasting rights to the All-Star Game and Stanley Cup Final. Howie Rose and Mike Keenan were the commentators for Global's coverage.

Starting with 1993–94 NHL season, Westwood One's NHL Radio package debuted (covering the All-Star Game, Stanley Cup Final, selected early round playoff action, and eventually, the Winter Classic).

XM Satellite Radio is the official satellite radio broadcaster of the NHL, as of July 1, 2007. Between September 2005 and June 2007, the NHL's broadcasting rights were shared with both XM and Sirius Satellite Radio and were broadcast on just Sirius before the NHL lockout. XM used to broadcast more than 80% of NHL games, including all the playoffs and finals. Starting with the 2007–08 season, XM broadcasts every game.

On December 22, 2015, the NHL announced that TuneIn would gain radio rights to the NHL. TuneIn would create an individual station for every NHL team to simulcast their home market broadcasts on. Additionally, TuneIn would create a replay channel for each team so fans could listen to the games archived. They would also create a 24/7 NHL Channel, and the NHL would imbed TuneIn's player onto the NHL.com website. All TuneIn NHL items would be made available to the entire public free. The first broadcasts for TuneIn began New Years Day, 2016.

On Tuesday, May 3, 2016, NBC Sports Radio was granted rights to broadcast and syndicate the 2016 Stanley Cup Final. Kenny Albert provided the play-by-play while Joe Micheletti served as color commentator. This would be the first neutral national broadcast since the 2008 NHL Radio broadcast.

The Sports USA Radio Network took over rights to the NHL in February 2021 and broadcast the two outdoor games held in the 2020–21 NHL season and playoff games. It would later renew its rights until the 2024-25 season.

== See also ==
- List of current National Hockey League broadcasters
- NHL Home Ice
- Sabres Hockey Network
- Boston Bruins Radio Network
