= Charlie Slowes =

American sportscaster

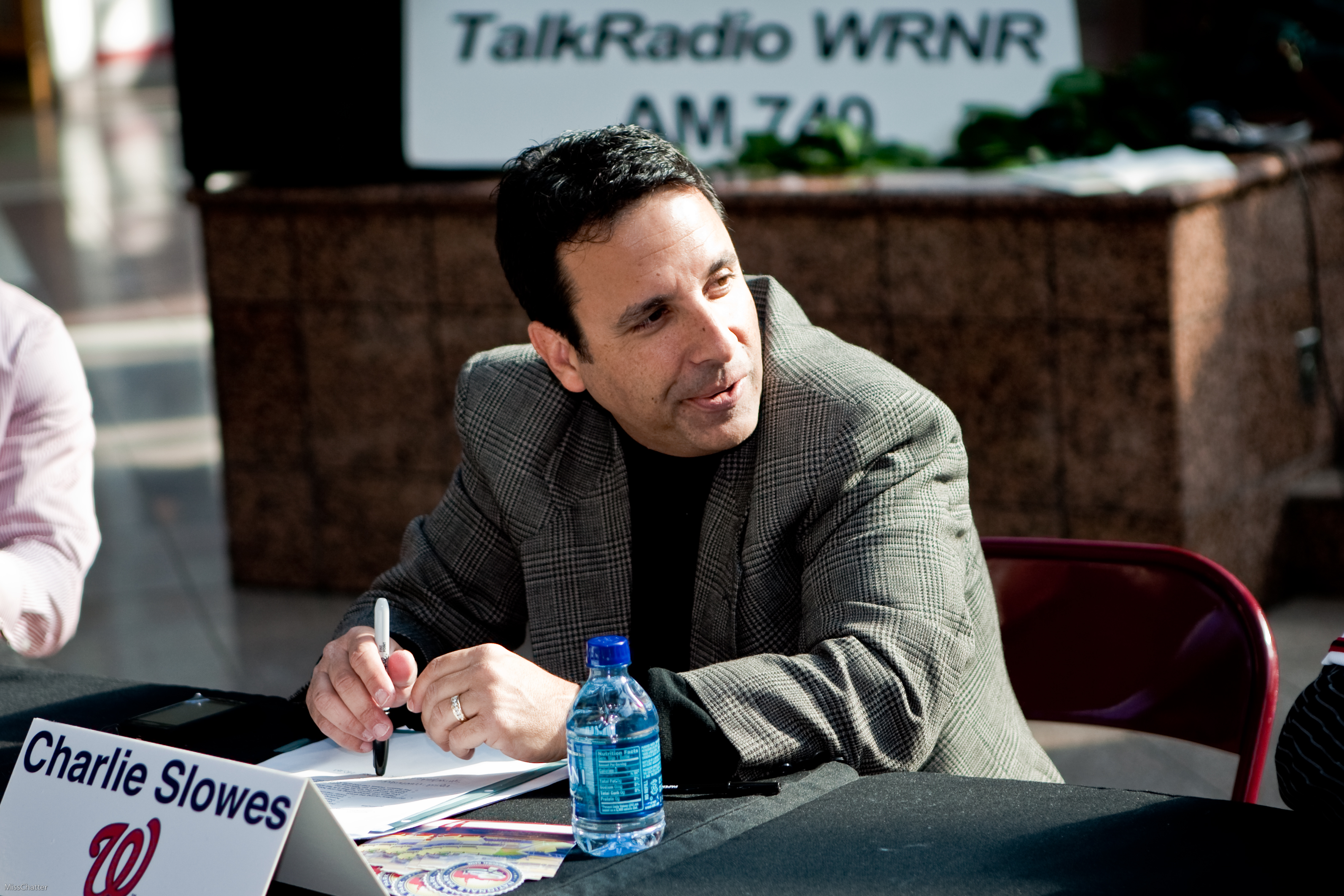
- Slowes in 2009.
- Born: Charles Martin Slowes; March 16, 1962 (age 64); The Bronx, New York, U.S.
- Education: Fordham University
- Sports commentary career
- Team(s): Washington Bullets (1986–97); Tampa Bay Devil Rays (1998–2004); Washington Nationals (2005–present)
- Genre: Play-by-play
- Sport(s): Major League Baseball; National Basketball Association

Charles Martin Slowes (born March 16, 1962) is an American sportscaster. Slowes is the radio play-by-play announcer for Washington Nationals baseball, and can be heard commentating every game on WJFK-FM 106.7 ("The Fan") and the rest of the team's radio network.

== Broadcasting experience ==
A native of The Bronx, New York City and Yonkers, New York, Slowes is a 1983 graduate of Fordham University. He began his career at KMOX radio in St. Louis, where he worked alongside broadcasting greats Jack Buck and Bob Costas. He has also worked for ESPN, NBC Sports, CBS Sports Radio, Mutual Radio, Westwood One, Sports Phone, the New York Mets and Baltimore Orioles radio networks, and the minor league AAA Tidewater Tides. On April 15, 1989, Slowes called a Major League Baseball Game of the Week on NBC between the Houston Astros and Los Angeles Dodgers alongside Larry Dierker.

Slowes was also the radio voice of the Washington Bullets (later to become the Washington Wizards) from the 1986–87 NBA season to the 1996–97 NBA season. After 11 seasons with the Bullets, he joined the expansion Tampa Bay Devil Rays in 1998 as their radio play-by-play announcer, a position he held until 2004 when he joined the Nationals the next year. Since 2006, he has teamed with Dave Jageler for Washington Nationals broadcasts.

Slowes called the Nationals' run to the 2019 World Series, at which the Nationals gave Washington its first World Series title since the Washington Senators won it in 1924.

== Trademarks ==
Slowes's broadcasting style typically features home run calls of "Going, going, gone, goodbye!" and "Bang, zoom goes [players name]!"

After every game the Nationals win, Slowes announces "A Curly W [referring to the Nationals' logo] is in the books"

After a particularly poor baserunning decision by Nook Logan, Slowes gave a particularly memorable call, "What was Nook Logan thinking, what was he watching, where was he going?"

== See also ==
- List of Washington Nationals broadcasters
