= Bob Carpenter (sportscaster) =

American sportscaster and announcer

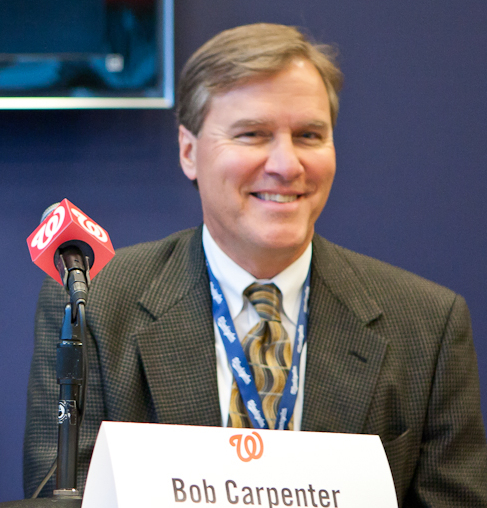
- Carpenter in 2011
- Born: March 4, 1953 (age 73); St. Louis, Missouri, U.S.
- Spouse: Debbie Carpenter
- Children: 2
- Sports commentary career
- Team: Washington Nationals
- Genre: Play-by-play
- Sport: Baseball

Bob Carpenter (born 1953) is an American former sportscaster who was the play-by-play announcer for Major League Baseball's Washington Nationals on MASN. He was born in St. Louis, Missouri, and graduated from McBride High School. Carpenter attended the University of Missouri-St. Louis, and later graduated with honors from the University of Missouri-Kansas City with a bachelor's degree in Radio-TV-Film.

== Biography ==
Carpenter was the Washington Nationals TV broadcaster from 2006-2025.

Carpenter served two stints calling television broadcasts for the St. Louis Cardinals, and also spent 16 seasons as a baseball announcer with ESPN, 18 seasons overall with the network, also covering soccer, college baseball, basketball and football and minor league baseball in addition to the major leagues. He also served as a team broadcaster for the New York Mets, Minnesota Twins and Texas Rangers.

From 1978 until 1984, Carpenter called soccer games for the Tulsa Roughnecks of the North American Soccer League and the St. Louis Steamers of the Major Indoor Soccer League. He announced two World Cups for ESPN; 1982 with Bob Ley and 1994 (10 games) with Seamus Malin and Clive Charles.

In his first major league season, 1984, Carpenter developed his own baseball scorebook. He started marketing it in 1995, and "Bob Carpenter's Scorebook" is now used by many college, major and minor league announcers. It is the most widely used scorebook in the nation by fans and broadcasters.

He also called NCAA Basketball on CBS as well as college football and basketball games for USA Sports and Major League Baseball for NBC. In addition to baseball and college sports, Carpenter called tennis (1995 U.S. Open) and golf (Masters 1986–1988) for USA Network. Carpenter called six NCAA basketball tournaments for ESPN and CBS, plus the 2005 Final Four in St. Louis for NCAA International.

Carpenter is a two-time St. Louis-area Emmy Award winner for his coverage of the Cardinals, and has been nominated for six Emmys overall; one in New York (Mets '92, Outstanding Sports Coverage), four in St. Louis and one in the Washington/Baltimore region (Nationals '08, Sports Play-by-Play). Carpenter was named the 2014 Washington, DC Sportscaster of the Year (along with Washington Capitals TV voice Joe Beninati) by the National Sportswriters and Sportscasters Association. He has called seven no-hitters: Montreal's David Palmer at St. Louis in 1984 (shortened to five innings by rain), Cardinals rookies Jose Jimenez at Arizona in 1999 and Bud Smith at San Diego in 2001, Washington's Jordan Zimmermann versus Miami at Nationals Park on the last day of the 2014 season, Washington's Max Scherzer over Pittsburgh at Nationals Park on June 20, 2015, Scherzer's second 2015 no-hitter at New York versus the Mets October 3, and San Diego Padre Dylan Cease versus the Nationals in Washington on July 25, 2024. With ESPN, St. Louis and Washington, Carpenter has called numerous division clinchers, and announced the 1996 NLCS for St. Louis on KMOX Radio.

Carpenter called TV play-by-play for University of Oklahoma men's and women's basketball for 16 years, retiring from hoops in February 2017. He also covered Oral Roberts University basketball games in the baseball off-season. In March 2017, Carpenter was inducted into the Oklahoma Association of Broadcasters Hall of Fame.

In March 2025, Carpenter announced that the 2025 season would be his last, and that he would retire following the conclusion of the season's schedule. Carpenter was given a retirement ceremony at Nationals Park on September 27, 2025, celebrating his 42 years of broadcasting and 20 years with the Nationals, then called his last game the following day, along with fellow MASN commentator Kevin Frandsen.

== Trademarks ==
- See ... you ... later! after a home run is hit by the Nationals. ... Carpenter also used the phrase when signing off after a Nationals win.
- So long ... for just a while at signoff after a Nationals loss, a tribute to Jack Buck with whom Carpenter shared the St. Louis TV booth in 1984, his rookie season as a Major League Baseball broadcaster.

== See also ==
- List of Washington Nationals broadcasters

Media offices
Preceded by Tim Brando	ESPN College GameDay host 1989	Succeeded by Chris Fowler
