= Bob Fouracre =

American sportscaster (1937–2021)

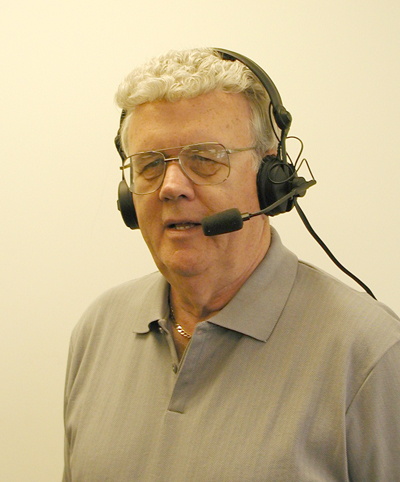
- Fouracre broadcasting Holy Cross football in 2005
- Born: November 22, 1937; Worcester, Massachusetts, U.S.
- Died: April 17, 2021 (aged 83); Leicester, Massachusetts, U.S.
- Occupation: Sportscaster

Robert E. Fouracre (November 22, 1937 – April 17, 2021) was an American sportscaster who called football and basketball for the College of the Holy Cross. He was a 1956 graduate of Northboro High School, a 1958 graduate of the Cushing Academy and a 1962 graduate of the Cambridge School of Broadcasting.

Fouracre called Holy Cross football from 1970 to 2015 and Holy Cross Crusaders men's basketball from 1989 to 2015. From 1970 to 1981, Fouracre worked at WSMW-TV, where he called Boston Celtics games (1971–73), hosted "Bay State Bowling" (1970–81), and called college basketball and football games. Fouracre began his career at WARE, calling high school sports from 1962 to 1969 and called New England Patriots preseason games in 1971. Fouracre called games for the WBL's Worcester Counts in 1989, the CBA's Bay State Bombardiers on NESN and WORC (AM) (1983–86), and hosted "Big Shot Bowling" on NESN (1985–91). He is, to date, the only person to call play-by-play in the National Basketball Association (NBA), the Continental Basketball Association (CBA) and the World Basketball League (WBL). His former broadcasting partners include Bob Cousy, Togo Palazzi, Upton Bell, Gino Cappelletti, Gordie Lockbaum, Gary Tanguay and Greg Dickerson. For one season he worked on New England Patriots preseason.

Fouracre was suspended as host of the Holy Cross football and basketball shows on WGMC TV-3 in September 1998 after police charged him with assaulting a reporter and cameraman from the cable television station. The charges were dismissed by agreement of the parties four months later.

== Health and death ==
In January 2005, Fouracre underwent an angioplasty and had three stents installed in the major artery of his heart. He died on April 17, 2021

== Honors ==
On May 5, 2007, Fouracre was inducted into the Holy Cross Varsity Club Hall of Fame. On October 11, 2008, Fouracre was inducted into the International Candlepin Bowling Hall of Fame.
