= Dave Jageler =

American baseball broadcaster (born 1971)

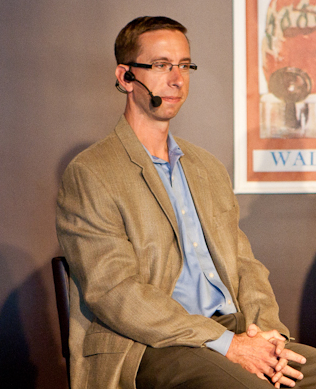
- Jageler in 2010
- Born: David E. Jageler; October 16, 1971 (age 54); Windsor, Connecticut, U.S.
- Education: Syracuse University; S.I. Newhouse School of Public Communications
- Sports commentary career
- Team: Washington Nationals (2006–present)
- Genre: Play-by-play
- Sport: Major League Baseball

David E. Jageler (born October 16, 1971) is an American baseball broadcaster. He joined Charlie Slowes in the Washington Nationals radio broadcast booth to call games in 2006.

Prior to joining the Washington Nationals, Jageler was the voice of International League Triple A Pawtucket Red Sox for the 2005 season. He has also called baseball games for the Charlotte Knights and Syracuse Chiefs. Pawtucket is noted as being a springboard for Major League baseball broadcasters. Jageler joins former Pawtucket announcers Gary Cohen (New York Mets), Don Orsillo (San Diego Padres), Dave Flemming (San Francisco Giants), Andy Freed (Tampa Bay Devil Rays) and Aaron Goldsmith (Seattle Mariners) in the Majors. Before working as a full-time baseball announcer, Jageler worked in Boston and Charlotte, North Carolina as a sportscaster, co-hosting talk shows and doing play by play of various sports, including fill-in work on the Boston Celtics radio network and serving as the team's PA announcer during part of the 2002–03 NBA season. While in Charlotte he was the voice of Collegiate Division I Charlotte 49ers (University of North Carolina at Charlotte) basketball team.

Jageler is a 1993 graduate of the S.I. Newhouse School of Public Communications at Syracuse University with a degree in broadcast journalism.

Jageler called every Nationals regular-season game from Opening Day in 2006 – his first as a Nationals broadcaster – until May 31, 2018, when he finally missed a game to attend his son's high school graduation. His Nationals broadcasting streak ended at 2,016 consecutive games. Longtime Harrisburg Senators broadcaster Terry Byrom took his place for four games from May 31 through June 3, 2018. Jageler returned to the booth on June 5, 2018.

== See also ==
- List of Washington Nationals broadcasters

Preceded by Greg Dickerson	Boston Celtics Public Address Announcer; 2002–2003	Succeeded by Eddie Palladino
