= Mike Gorman =

American sportscaster

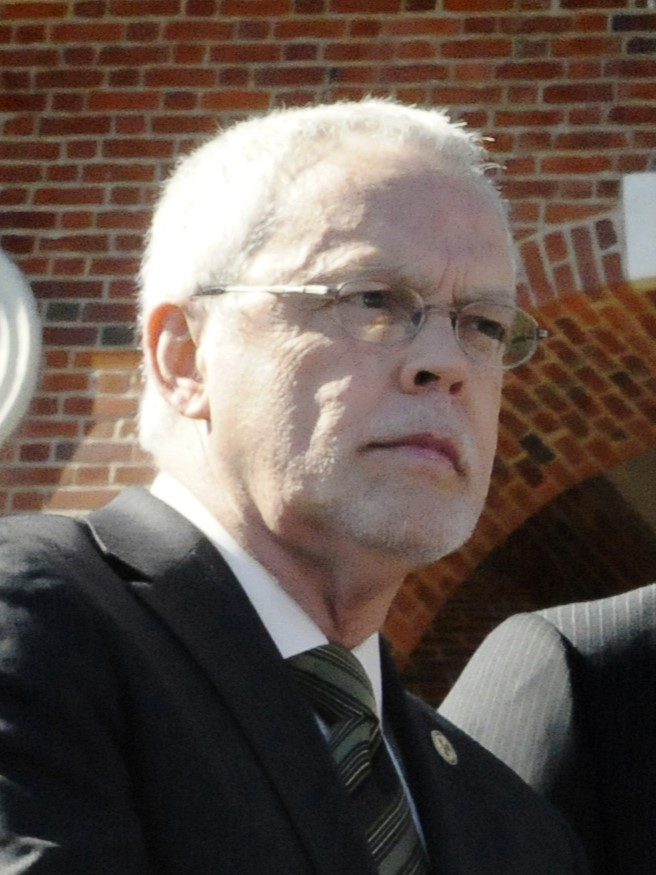
- Gorman at the Massachusetts State House in 2008
- Born: November 24, 1947 (age 78); Boston, Massachusetts, U.S.
- Education: Boston State College
- Years active: 1970s–2024
- Sports commentary career
- Team: Boston Celtics
- Genre: Play-by-play
- Sport: Basketball
- Employer: NBC Sports Boston

Mike Gorman (born November 24, 1947) is an American former sports commentator. After returning from the United States Navy in the 1970s, he began working at radio and television stations in Massachusetts and Rhode Island with the help of fellow commentator Gil Santos. Starting in 1981, Gorman began providing play-by-play commentary for local television broadcasts of the Boston Celtics, doing so alongside color commentator and Celtics legend Tom Heinsohn. The duo called games together until 2020, with Gorman later retiring from broadcasting in 2024.

Outside of the Celtics, Gorman also worked with CBS, ESPN, NBC, and TBS, providing play-by-play for events like Big East basketball games, NCAA basketball tournament games, the NBA playoffs, and the Summer Olympic Games. Gorman was enshrined in the Naismith Memorial Basketball Hall of Fame in 2021 as a recipient of the Curt Gowdy Award.

== Early life ==
Gorman was born on November 24, 1947, in the Dorchester neighborhood of Boston, Massachusetts, as the youngest of three children. As a child, he served as an altar boy at the St. Brendan Parish and attended Boston Latin School. His interest in basketball stemmed from viewing NBA box scores in the Boston American newspaper. Occasionally, he would attempt to sneak into Boston Celtics games at the Boston Garden by climbing up a fire escape. He played basketball for Boston Latin as a guard, becoming a standout player for the school.

Gorman graduated from Boston State College, now known as the University of Massachusetts Boston, in 1969, studying to become a teacher and coach. Shortly after graduating, however, Gorman was drafted into the United States Navy and became an aviator specializing in reconnaissance. He served in the VP-44 squadron operating out of Naval Air Station Brunswick, and was regarded by the squadron as one of their most trustworthy aviators. Gorman was originally due to take part in an air mission near the coast of Spain in 1972 that eventually crashed into a mountain while operating in poor weather, killing all 14 crewmen on board; he had been redirected to handle paperwork at the last minute. The guilt Gorman felt from not being able to assist his squadron during the mission led to him never flying again and later retiring from the Navy in 1973, returning to live with his parents in Dorchester afterward.

== Career ==
=== Early work ===
While looking for work after returning from the Navy, Gorman became interested in the radio and television industries after a fellow Navy crewman discussed his past experience in the fields with him. As a result, he attempted to seek advice from Boston-based broadcaster Gil Santos at WBZ. After being initially turned away by the WBZ security guard, the guard allowed Gorman into the building after learning that he was a fellow Navy veteran. Though WBZ did not have any open positions, Santos assisted Gorman in being hired at the New Bedford-based WNBH station by fabricating Gorman's background in radio. After selling advertisements and rotating elevator music tapes at WNBH, Gorman went on to work at WPRO in Providence, Rhode Island, and also became the sports director for WPRI-TV, serving as the play-by-play commentator for the Providence Friars men's basketball team.

=== Boston Celtics ===
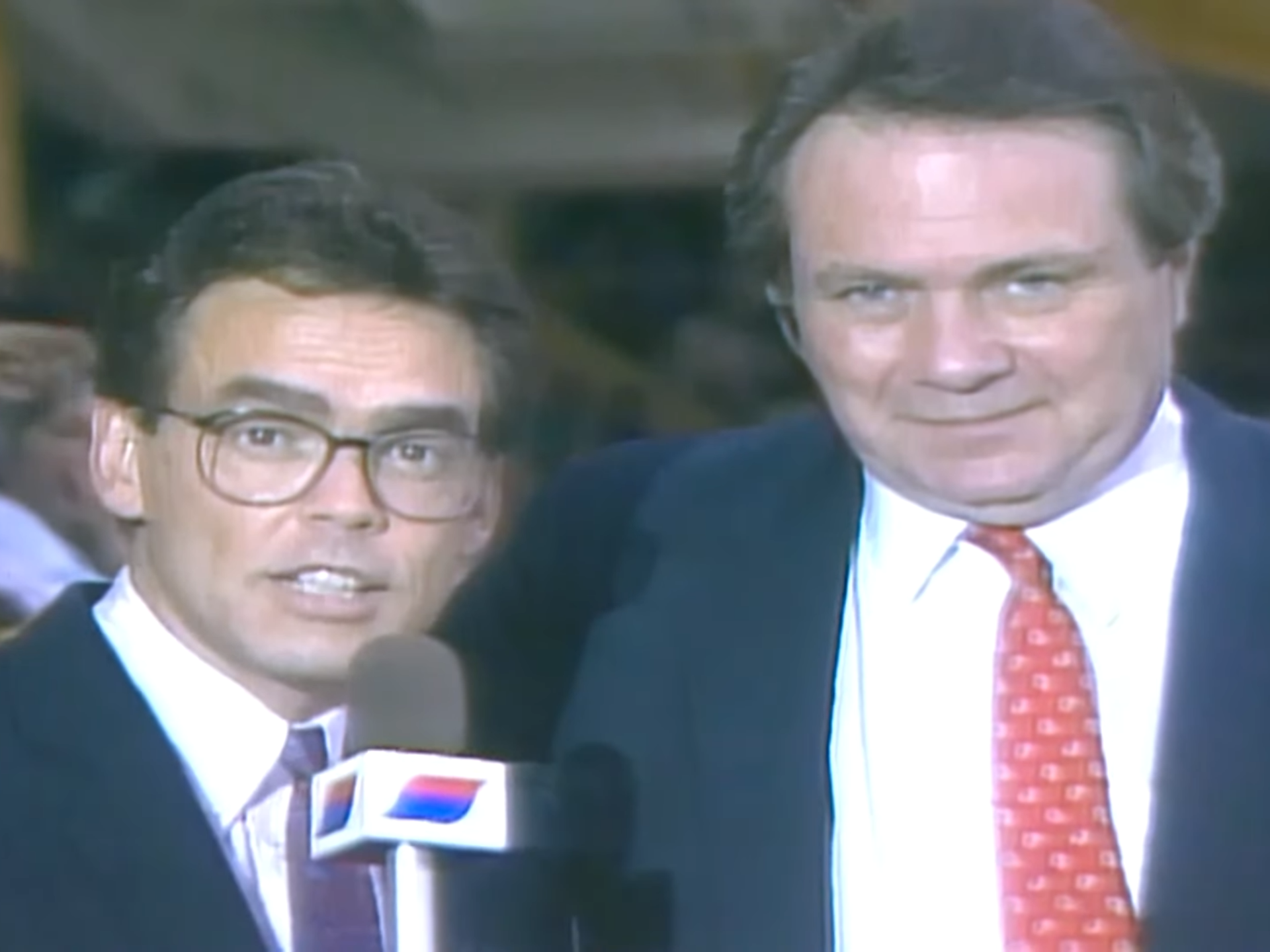
Gorman with Tom Heinsohn (right) at the beginning of a Celtics broadcast on SportsChannel New England

On November 1, 1981, The Boston Globe reported that Gorman would begin calling television broadcasts of Boston Celtics games on PRISM New England alongside color commentator and Celtics legend Tom Heinsohn. Colloquially known as "Mike and Tommy", they formed one of the longest-tenured broadcast tandems in professional sports, lasting 39 years.

Heinsohn influenced Gorman's commentary technique by encouraging him to "talk about what we see in front of us" rather than conventionally referring to sets of notes about each team. Gorman's trademark calls during Celtics games would be occasionally exclaiming "got it!" or "takes it... makes it!" whenever a Celtics player made an important shot. He was inspired by Celtics radio commentator Johnny Most and his "bang!" call to make a signature call of his own; Most personally approved of the "got it!" call. Gorman considered the team's 2007–08 season, in which they won their record-setting 17th NBA championship, to be his favorite season as a commentator. Gorman's partnership with Heinsohn came to an end when Heinsohn died in November 2020. Former Celtics player and 2008 NBA champion Brian Scalabrine took over Heinsohn's role as the color commentator.

Prior to the 2023–24 season, Gorman announced his intention to retire following the season's conclusion. For his final season, Gorman called only Celtics home games while Drew Carter called all Celtics road games. During the final game of the Celtics' regular season on April 12, 2024, the courtside broadcasting table for TD Garden was renamed to the "Mike Gorman Broadcast Table" in a halftime ceremony honoring Gorman, which also featured a video package going through his most iconic moments, an interview and numerous standing ovations. In addition, Boston mayor Michelle Wu declared April 12, 2024, as "Mike Gorman Day" to honor his final regular season game with the Celtics.

Gorman's final game as a broadcaster came on May 1, 2024, in which the Celtics eliminated the Miami Heat from the playoffs in the fifth game of the first round. His tenure with the Celtics lasted 43 years. Gorman's last game came one day before the final broadcast for longtime Boston Bruins play-by-play commentator Jack Edwards, who also announced his retirement during the Bruins' season. The Celtics went on to win a record-setting 18th NBA championship, defeating the Dallas Mavericks; Gorman joined the Celtics for their duck boat victory parade afterward. He was succeeded by Carter full-time as the Celtics' television play-by-play commentator.

=== National television ===
Outside of working with the Celtics locally, Gorman also worked with multiple national television networks as a commentator. He served as the play-by-play commentator for ESPN's "Big Monday" Big East Game of the Week alongside color commentator Bill Raftery. He additionally called some NCAA basketball tournament games on CBS as well as the NBA playoffs on TBS. Gorman also worked with NBC to provide commentary at multiple Summer Olympic Games. He first called tennis matches at the 1992 Summer Olympics in Barcelona. He later provided commentary for handball at the 2012 Summer Olympics in London and called men's basketball games at the 2016 Summer Olympics in Rio de Janeiro, doing the latter alongside Fran Fraschilla.

== Personal life ==
Gorman has been married twice, having a daughter, Kristen, from his first marriage. He has been married to his second wife, Teri (nee Schindler), since 1988; the two met while she had been a television stage manager for college basketball games and Gorman had been calling Big East basketball games. Gorman's wife would go on to produce Big East basketball broadcasts, with the two of them collaborating on editing game highlights. They lived in an 85th Street apartment in the Manhattan borough of New York City while she had been working for the WNBA, before eventually moving to South Salem, New York. As of 2019, Gorman and his wife resided in a penthouse apartment nearby TD Garden. Since retirement Gorman has enjoyed a quiet life reading books, fishing and continuing to watch Celtics games. He has also made his acting debut serving as a special guest in the play Nassim.

Gorman's typical gameday routine included exercising for one hour and taking a nap for half an hour prior to the game. In 2023, he suffered a sudden detached retina while having lunch that resulted in him temporarily losing sight in one eye; the injury would have resulted in permanent blindness had he not been operated on within 48 hours. The surgery resulted in him briefly calling Celtics games with an eye patch, and contributed to his decision to retire after the 2023–24 season.

== Accolades ==
Gorman is a five-time recipient of the Sports Emmy Award. He was inducted into the New England Basketball Hall of Fame in 2004. In 2016 Gorman alongside his former broadcast partner Tom Heinsohn were both inducted into the Massachusetts Broadcasting Hall of Fame. In 2021, he was enshrined in the Naismith Memorial Basketball Hall of Fame after receiving the Curt Gowdy Electronic Media Award for his contributions as a basketball commentator. In 2024 Gorman was named that years JFK National Award Winner, a yearly award given out to a prominent Irish-American.
