= Cy Follmer =

American broadcaster (1933–2009)

Cyrus Brown "Cy" Follmer Jr. (December 14, 1933 – June 28, 2009) was an American broadcaster who was a play-by-play announcer for the Kentucky Wildcats men's basketball team and the Boston Celtics of the National Basketball Association.

== Early life ==
Follmer was born on December 14, 1933, in Berlin, where his father was U.S. Vice Consul. He served in the United States Marine Corps during the Korean War. He later graduated from the University of Texas at Austin with a degree in broadcasting.

== Broadcasting ==
After graduating, Follmer worked for KASE in Austin, Texas. In 1961, he moved to KXYZ in Houston. In 1963, he began hosting the After Hours Show, a 2 to 3 am jazz program on KTOK in Oklahoma City. He then worked for WSVA AM, WSVA-FM, and WSVA-TV. In 1965, he left Harrisonburg to become sports director at WTVM in Columbus, Georgia. He then moved to WLEX-TV in Lexington, Kentucky, where he was the sports director and play-by-play announcer for Kentucky Wildcats men's basketball. In 1970, he joined WSMW-TV in Worcester, Massachusetts, as sports director and play-by-play announcer for Boston Celtics. He left WSMW in 1971.

== Later life ==
After broadcasting, Follmer worked as a stockbroker. In 1993, he was fined $50,000, required to pay $53,000 in restitution to customers, and barred from working for any National Association of Securities Dealers (NASD) member by the NASD after it found that Follmer had solicited and accepted $53,000 from customers for the purchase of securities but instead used the money for his own benefit. He later worked as a business consultant and did voice-over work.

== Death ==
Follmer died on June 28, 2009, in Harrodsburg, Kentucky.
