= Upton Bell =

American sports executive and commentator

- Born: October 13, 1937 (age 88); Philadelphia, Pennsylvania, U.S.
- Occupations: Professional football executive, sports commentator, talk show host
- Known for: New England Patriots general manager (1971–1972)
- Parents: Bert Bell (father); Frances Upton (mother)
- Relatives: John C. Bell (grandfather); John C. Bell Jr. (uncle)

Upton P. Bell (born October 13, 1937) is an American former National Football League (NFL) executive, talk show host, and sports commentator. He is the son of former NFL commissioner Bert Bell and Broadway theatre actress Frances Upton.

== Early life ==
Bell was the child of De Benneville "Bert" Bell, a college football quarterback at the University of Pennsylvania, a college assistant coach at Penn and Temple University, an NFL head coach (Philadelphia Eagles and Pittsburgh Steelers), an NFL team owner (Eagles and Steelers), and NFL Commissioner (1946–1959), and actress Frances Upton, who had been a Ziegfeld Follies star. He was raised in Narberth, Pennsylvania. Bell attended Malvern Prep, where he was a standout on the basketball team. His teammates included future college and National Basketball Association head coach Paul Westhead. He also played in the Narberth Basketball League, where future Naismith Memorial Basketball Hall of Fame and College Basketball Hall of Fame coach George Raveling was a teammate. Bell's grandfather, John Cromwell Bell, was a Pennsylvania attorney general; and his uncle, John C. Bell Jr., was a governor and lieutenant governor of Pennsylvania when Bell was a child, and later Chief Justice of Pennsylvania's Supreme Court.

== Football executive ==
=== Baltimore Colts ===
Bell was present on the day Bert Bell suffered a fatal heart attack at Franklin Field during an Eagles-Steelers football game, on October 11, 1959. Bert Bell had named Baltimore Colts owner Carroll Rosenbloom as his executor. The elder Bell had coached Rosenbloom at Penn and later convinced Rosenbloom to purchase the Baltimore Colts. After Bell's death, Rosenbloom hired Bell's sons Upton and Bert Jr. to work for the Colts.

Bell started his football career by working at the Baltimore Colts' training camp, was an assistant equipment manager, moved to the ticket office, and in 1964 transitioned to the Colts' scouting department where he became personnel director in May 1966. On his first day meeting the Colts players like Johnny Unitas, Ray Berry and Big Daddy Lipscomb, he was warmly welcomed and was told how much they appreciated his father. Although Colts general manager Don Kellett told Bell not to drink with the players when he joined the team he did anyway, and learned how professional football players thought.

Bell's responsibilities included scouting, and negotiating and signing contracts with all college football recruits. He played a role in drafting Mike Curtis and Norm Bulaich for the Colts. He worked with hall of fame coaches Weeb Ewbank, Don Shula, and Chuck Noll. During Upton's tenure, the Colts were in two NFL Championship games (1964 and 1968 both against the Cleveland Browns) and two Super Bowl games, losing Super Bowl III in 1969 then winning Super Bowl V in 1971 under new head coach Don McCafferty. Seventeen of the 40-man roster on that winning team were players drafted during Upton's tenure as personnel director. Bell held the personnel director's job until he was hired to become the general manager of the then Boston Patriots.

=== New England Patriots ===
Bell joined the Patriots in February 1971, and at age 33 was the NFL's youngest general manager. One of Bell's first moves was recommending to the Patriots' board of directors that they change the team name from the proposed Bay State Patriots to New England Patriots, as the team relocated from Boston to Foxborough, Massachusetts. He attempted a trade involving disgruntled Dallas Cowboys running back Duane Thomas coming to the Patriots and the Patriots Carl Garrett going to Dallas, which was reversed. His later involvement in suspending Garrett, which suspension was reversed by NFL Commissioner Pete Rozelle, was one of the reasons for Bell's later firing.

Bell later hired Bucko Kilroy and put together the Patriots' first scouting department. For the scouting department Bell hired Tom Boisture, Dick Steinberg, Mike Hickey and Bob Terpening, all of whom went on to head scouting positions in the NFL. Bell also hired as assistant general manager Peter Hadhazy, who later became general manager of the Cleveland Browns.

Under Bell's leadership, the Patriots improved from their 1970 record of 2–12 to 6–8 in 1971. Despite the improvement, Bell wanted to fire head coach John Mazur and hire a coach of his own choosing. The team's board of directors agreed that if the Patriots lost to the Baltimore Colts in the final week of the regular season, Mazur would be fired. The Patriots won, 21–17, helped by an 88-yard touchdown pass from Jim Plunkett to Randy Vataha (who had also played together at Stanford University) in the fourth quarter. The Patriots fell to 3–11 the following season, and Bell was fired on December 5, 1972. Despite this, Bell was paid by the Patriots for many years after.

=== Charlotte Hornets ===
Bell returned to professional football in 1974 with the purchase of the New York Stars in the World Football League (WFL). Bell, who also served as team president and general manager, relocated the team to Charlotte, North Carolina, where the team was renamed the Charlotte Hornets. This venture was short-lived due to the folding of the WFL in 1975. One of Bell's co-owners was Arnold Palmer. After the closure of the WFL, many of Bell's players along with all his coaches were signed into the NFL. They included Lindy Infante, who became the Packers' head coach; Tom Moore who went on to coach in various roles in the NFL from 1977 to the present (2024) for the Pittsburgh Steelers, Minnesota Vikings, Detroit Lions, Indianapolis Colts, New Orleans Saints, New York Jets, Tennessee Titans, Arizona Cardinals, and Tampa Bay Buccaneers (where he coached in Tom Brady's final season); and Bob Gibson, the Hornets head coach, who went on to coach with the Detroit Lions and New York Giants. Bell also recommended Charlotte to the NFL as a franchise city.

== Sports announcer ==
Starting in 1976, Bell began a long media career by making guest appearances on programs such as John Sterling's show on WMCA in New York. In 1977, Bell was the host of the Pats Post Game Show on WBZ. In 1978, he became co-host of WBZ's Calling All Sports with newcomer Bob Lobel. Other shows hosted by Bell included Sports Nightly (1979–1980), Sports Line on WEEI (1980–1984), Sports Beat on WSBK-TV (1989–1996) with Joe Fitzgerald, Bob Ryan and Bob Lobel, and Upton Commentary with columnist Will McDonough of The Boston Globe on WNEV Channel 7 (1984–1988) and New England Sports Final (1989–2007). He was also a guest commentator on NECN and Sports Final on WBZ-TV. During the 1989 and 1990 NFL seasons, Bell served as an interviewer for WBZ-TV during their Patriots pre-game show and newscasts.

Bell's first color commentary experience came at WSMW where he called college football with Bob Fouracre from 1978 to 1982. In 1983, Bell served as the color commentator for the Boston Breakers professional football team on WNEV and ESPN and was the studio host for Sports Channel New England. He was the color commentator for the Boston College Eagles football radio broadcasts with play-by-play announcers Dan Davis in 1985 and Bob Lobel in 1986. Bell was also a fill in-color commentator for Sports Channel New England's Boston Celtics games as well as host of their nightly talk show.

Nationally, Bell worked on Ivy League football games on PBS alongside play-by-play announcer Dick Galiette and sideline reporter Sean McDonough in 1984. Bell also was co-host of the first national television show on the NFL draft on PBS in 1977. He was also involved in ESPN's first year covering the NFL draft.

== Talk radio ==
Bell transitioned from sports talk on radio to general talk in 1988. He succeeded Dave Maynard on WBZ radio in 1990. After 1988, Bell hosted shows on WHDH (1988–1989), WTAG (1992–1998), WRPT/WMEX (1998–2003). For three consecutive years, the Upton Bell Show was recognized by the Associated Press as Outstanding Talk Show in New England.

Notable people that Bell interviewed include George H. W. Bush, Bill Clinton, Tip O'Neill, Stephen Hawking, Henry Kissinger, Ted Kennedy, Geraldine Ferraro, Norman Mailer, Regis Philbin, Frank McCourt, Jay Leno, Dr. Joyce Brothers, Jackie Mason, Sam Donaldson, Stephen King, Johnnie Cochran and Alan Dershowitz.

In November 2010, Bell and Bob Lobel reunited briefly with a Sunday morning program on WXKS 1200 Radio in suburban Boston.

== Later life ==
In January 2015, Bell suffered 39 fractures and a concussion in an automobile accident.

== Works ==
- Bell, Upton (2017). Present at the Creation: My Life in the NFL and the Rise of America's Game. with Ron Borges. University of Nebraska Press. ISBN 978-1496200396.
