= Sean Grande =

American sportscaster

Sean Grande is an American television and radio sportscaster. He is primarily known as the voice of the Boston Celtics.

== Biography ==
=== Early career in Boston ===
Grande was born in New York City, and attended Boston University, graduating in 1993. He spent seven seasons calling hockey, football and basketball on both WABU-TV and WBUR-FM for the Terriers. In 1996, he moved to Boston College, as the voice of the Eagles football and hockey radio networks. On the television side, Grande was the voice of the Hockey East Game of the Week on Fox Sports Net. From 1995 to 1998, he was the "sports flash" anchor for the Eddie Andelman and Dale Arnold's show, The A-Team, on WEEI.

=== Move to Minnesota ===
In 1998, Grande replaced Kevin Harlan as the television voice of the Minnesota Timberwolves. From 1999 to 2000, he was the radio announcer for the Minnesota Lynx of the WNBA. He also spent two seasons (1999 and 2000), as part of ABC Sports' College Football broadcast team. His call of the January 1, 2001 Florida Citrus Bowl on ABC was seen in over ten million homes.

=== Return to Boston ===
Grande was recruited back to Boston in 2001 to serve as the radio play-by-play for the Boston Celtics. Grande provides play-by-play coverage alongside analyst Cedric Maxwell for all Boston Celtics radio broadcasts. On December 2, 2009, in San Antonio, Grande became the third man in NBA history to call 1,000 NBA games before age 40.

In 2013, Grande joined Joe Castiglione calling Red Sox games on WEEI when Dave O'Brien was on assignment until he, Maxwell and the Celtics departed for 98.5 the Sports Hub.

=== MMA and Boxing ===
In July 2015, Grande signed a multi-year deal as the lead play-by-play voice of Spike Sports. He took over as the announcer for Bellator MMA, the world's #2 mixed martial arts promotion. He stepped down from Bellator full-time in 2017 to spend more time with his son.

Grande also called boxing with both Premier Boxing Champions and Top Rank Boxing and was the play-by-play commentator for NBC's coverage of boxing at the 2024 Summer Olympics.

== Personal ==
In October 2018, it was announced on CBS This Morning that Grande had become engaged to CBS News anchor and former ESPN host Dana Jacobson. They married on September 28, 2019.

Preceded by Howard David	Boston Celtics Radio play by play announcer 2001–present	Succeeded by Present
Preceded by Sean McDonough	Boston College Eagles football play by play announcer 1996–1999	Succeeded by John Rooke
