= Doug Brown (sportscaster) =

American sportscaster

Doug Brown is an American sportscaster who has worked for ESPN Radio since 1993. He is currently the host of SportsCenterNightly.

Brown has previously worked for WSAR (1978–1981), WHLL (1981–1983), WNDS, WBZ Radio (1987), WEEI (1987–1991), WSBK-TV (1993–1996), WABU (1996–1999). He has hosted studio shows for the Boston Red Sox, Boston Celtics, and Boston Bruins and was the Celtics color commentator during the 1990–91 season.

For ESPN Radio, Brown called NBA and college basketball and reported and hosted shows from the Olympics, the World Series, the Final Four, and the 2010 FIFA World Cup.

Brown is a 1978 graduate of the Boston University College of Communication. He served as the play-by-play announcer for Boston University men's basketball on radio from 1981 to 1995 and from 2005 to 2024 and on television from 1995 to 1999.

Brown is also known by his nicknames, "Dougie Fresh" and "Downtown Dougie Brown."
