= Greg Dickerson =

American sportscaster

Greg Dickerson is a Boston sportscaster who served as the Boston Celtics sideline reporter and co-host of Sports Tonight for Comcast SportsNet New England.

Dickerson's career began in 1995 at WWTM in Worcester, Massachusetts and WBZ radio in Boston. From 1997 to 2002, he was the Celtics' public address announcer, as well as the alternate PA announcer for the New England Patriots and the PA announcer for the Worcester Ice Cats of the American Hockey League. He joined FSN New England's Celtics broadcast team during the 2002–2003 season as pre- and post-game host. He became the Celtics sideline reporter in 2005.

His other work included stints as an ESPN Radio SportsCenter host and as a studio host on NHL Radio. He was also a fill-in host for WEEI-FM and presently is a fill-in host on 98.5 The Sports Hub.

Dickerson studied at Dean College in Franklin, Massachusetts before transferring to Emerson College where he earned his degree.

Preceded by Andy Jick	Boston Celtics Public Address Announcer; 1997–2002	Succeeded by Eric Frede & Dave Jageler
