= List of Boston Red Sox broadcasters =

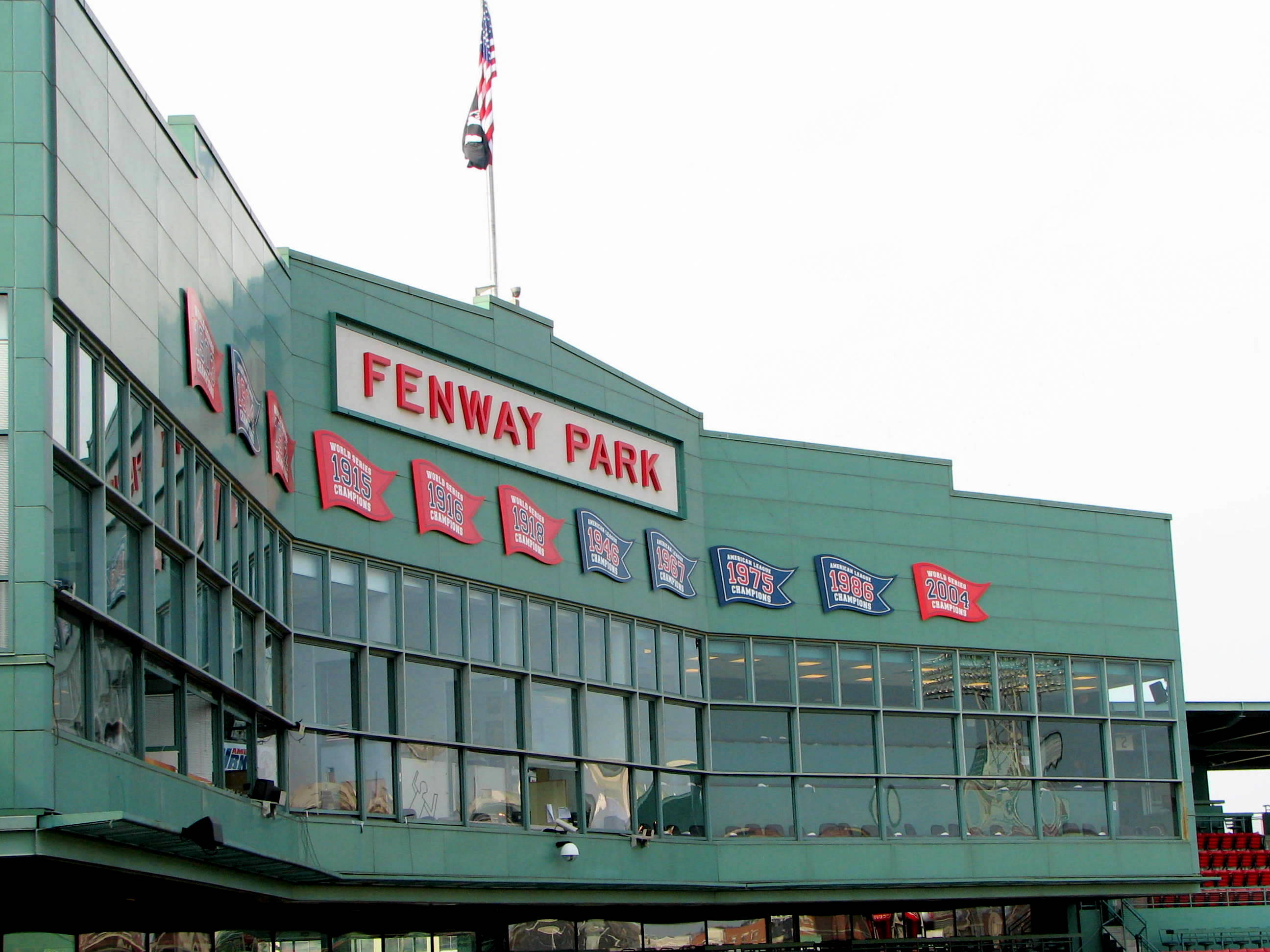
The Fenway Park press box

== Television ==
=== 2020s ===
Year	Channel	Play-by-play	Color commentator(s)	Field Level reporters	Studio host	Studio analysts
2025	NESN	Dave O'Brien (primary); Mike Monaco (select games)	Lou Merloni (primary); Will Middlebrooks (select games); Kevin Millar (select games)	Jahmai Webster	Tom Caron; Adam Pellerin (select games)	Jim Rice, Lenny DiNardo, Jonathan Papelbon, and/or Deven Marrero
2024	NESN	Dave O'Brien (primary); Mike Monaco (select games); Tom Caron (select games when O'Brien and Monaco are off); Emma Tiedemann (select games); Rylee Pay (select games)	Kevin Youkilis, Will Middlebrooks, Kevin Millar and/or Lou Merloni	Jahmai Webster or Tom Caron (when Webster is off)	Tom Caron or Adam Pellerin (when Caron is off, play-by-play, or sideline reporter)	Jim Rice, Lenny DiNardo, Jonathan Papelbon, Deven Marrero, and/or Will Middlebrooks
2023	NESN	Dave O'Brien or Mike Monaco	Kevin Youkilis, Will Middlebrooks, Kevin Millar or Lou Merloni	Jahmai Webster or Tom Caron (when Webster is off)	Tom Caron or Adam Pellerin	Jim Rice, Lenny DiNardo, Tim Wakefield, Jonathan Papelbon, Darnell McDonald, and/or Will Middlebrooks
2022	NESN	Dave O'Brien or Mike Monaco	Dennis Eckersley, Kevin Youkilis, Kevin Millar, or Tony Massarotti	Jahmai Webster or Tom Caron (when Webster is off)	Tom Caron or Adam Pellerin	Jim Rice, Lenny DiNardo, Tim Wakefield, Ellis Burks, Mo Vaughn, and/or Will Middlebrooks
2021	NESN	Dave O'Brien, Tom Caron or Mike Monaco	Jerry Remy, Dennis Eckersley, and/or Ellis Burks	Jahmai Webster or Tom Caron (when Webster is off)	Tom Caron or Adam Pellerin	Jim Rice, Lenny DiNardo, Tim Wakefield, Ellis Burks, Mo Vaughn, and/or Jonathan Papelbon
2020	NESN	Dave O'Brien or Tom Caron	Jerry Remy and/or Dennis Eckersley	Guerin Austin or Jahmai Webster	Tom Caron or Adam Pellerin	Dennis Eckersley, Steve Lyons, Tim Wakefield, Jim Rice, Lenny DiNardo or Manny Delcarmen

=== 2010s ===
Year	Channel	Play-by-play	Color commentator(s)	Field Level reporters	Studio host	Studio analysts
2019	NESN; WFXT (4 Spring Training games)	Dave O'Brien	Jerry Remy or Dennis Eckersley or Carlos Peña or Jarrod Saltalamacchia	Guerin Austin or Jahmai Webster	Tom Caron or Adam Pellerin	Dennis Eckersley, Steve Lyons, Tim Wakefield, Jim Rice, Lenny DiNardo or Manny Delcarmen
2018	NESN; WFXT (6 Spring Training games)	Dave O'Brien	Jerry Remy or Dennis Eckersley or Steve Lyons or Guest Analyst	Guerin Austin or Various	Tom Caron or Adam Pellerin	Dennis Eckersley, Steve Lyons, Tim Wakefield, Jim Rice, or Guest Analyst
2017	NESN	Dave O'Brien	Jerry Remy or Dennis Eckersley or Steve Lyons or Guest Analyst	Guerin Austin or Various	Tom Caron	Dennis Eckersley, Steve Lyons, Tim Wakefield, Jim Rice, or Guest Analyst
2016	NESN	Dave O'Brien	Jerry Remy or Dennis Eckersley or Steve Lyons	Guerin Austin or Gary Striewski	Tom Caron	Dennis Eckersley, Steve Lyons, Tim Wakefield, or Jim Rice
2015	NESN	Don Orsillo	Jerry Remy or Dennis Eckersley or Guest Analyst	Various	Tom Caron	Dennis Eckersley, Steve Lyons, Tim Wakefield, or Jim Rice
2014	NESN	Don Orsillo	Jerry Remy or Dennis Eckersley or Guest Analyst	Various	Tom Caron	Dennis Eckersley, Steve Lyons, Tim Wakefield, or Jim Rice
2013	NESN	Don Orsillo	Jerry Remy or Dennis Eckersley or Guest Analyst	Jenny Dell	Tom Caron	Dennis Eckersley, Peter Gammons, Matt Stairs, Tim Wakefield, or Jim Rice
2012	NESN	Don Orsillo	Jerry Remy	Jenny Dell	Tom Caron	Dennis Eckersley, Peter Gammons, Matt Stairs, Tim Wakefield, or Jim Rice
2011	NESN	Don Orsillo	Jerry Remy	Heidi Watney	Tom Caron	Dennis Eckersley, Peter Gammons, or Jim Rice
2010	NESN	Don Orsillo	Jerry Remy	Heidi Watney	Tom Caron	Dennis Eckersley, Peter Gammons, or Jim Rice

=== 2000s ===
Year	Channel	Play-by-play	Color commentator(s)	Field Level reporters	Studio host	Studio analysts
2009	NESN	Don Orsillo	Jerry Remy or Guest Analyst	Heidi Watney	Tom Caron	Jim Rice, Dennis Eckersley, or Guest Analyst
2008	NESN	Don Orsillo	Jerry Remy	Heidi Watney	Tom Caron	Jim Rice, Dennis Eckersley, Dave McCarty, Lou Merloni, or Ken Macha
2007	NESN	Don Orsillo	Jerry Remy	Tina Cervasio	Tom Caron	Jim Rice, Dennis Eckersley, Dave McCarty, Lou Merloni, or Ken Macha
2006	NESN	Don Orsillo	Jerry Remy	Tina Cervasio	Tom Caron	Jim Rice, Dennis Eckersley, or Dave McCarty
2005	NESN	Don Orsillo	Jerry Remy	Eric Frede	Tom Caron	Jim Rice, Dennis Eckersley, Sam Horn, Gary DiSarcina, or Bob Tewksbury
2005	WSBK-TV & WBZ-TV	Don Orsillo	Jerry Remy	Dan Roche	Bob Lobel	Jim Corsi, Steve Buckley, or Tony Massarotti
2004	NESN	Don Orsillo	Jerry Remy	Eric Frede	Tom Caron	Jim Rice, Dennis Eckersley, Sam Horn, Gary DiSarcina, or Bob Tewksbury
2004	WSBK-TV & WBZ-TV	Sean McDonough	Jerry Remy	Dan Roche	Bob Lobel	Jim Corsi, Steve Buckley, or Tony Massarotti
2003	NESN	Don Orsillo	Jerry Remy	Tom Caron	Bob Rodgers	Jim Corsi, Jim Rice or Dennis Eckersley
2003	WSBK-TV & WBZ-TV	Sean McDonough	Jerry Remy	Dan Roche	Bob Lobel	Jim Corsi, Steve Buckley, or Tony Massarotti
2002	NESN	Don Orsillo	Jerry Remy	Tom Caron	Bob Rodgers	Jim Corsi, Jim Rice or Dennis Eckersley
2002	WFXT	Sean McDonough	Jerry Remy		Butch Stearns	Rico Petrocelli
2001	NESN	Don Orsillo	Jerry Remy	Debbi Wrobleski	Bob Rodgers	Rico Petrocelli
2001	WFXT	Sean McDonough	Jerry Remy		Butch Stearns	
2000	NESN	Bob Kurtz or Bob Rodgers	Jerry Remy	Debbi Wrobleski	Bob Rodgers or Tom Caron	Rico Petrocelli
2000	WFXT	Sean McDonough	Jerry Remy		Butch Stearns	

=== Note ===
- Circa 2003–2005, WSBK-TV televised Friday night games in the Boston area while WBZ-TV televised the 4th of July game; these games were seen on NESN throughout the rest of New England.

=== 1990s ===
Year	Channel	Play-by-play	Color commentator(s)	Field Level reporters	Studio host	Studio analysts
1999	NESN	Bob Kurtz	Jerry Remy	Debbi Wrobleski	Bob Rodgers	
1999	WLVI-TV	Sean McDonough	Jerry Remy			
1998	NESN	Bob Kurtz	Jerry Remy	Debbi Wrobleski	Bob Rodgers	
1998	WABU	Sean McDonough	Jerry Remy	John Holt	Doug Brown	
1997	NESN	Bob Kurtz	Jerry Remy	Debbi Wrobleski	Bob Rodgers	
1997	WABU	Sean McDonough	Jerry Remy	John Holt	Doug Brown	Dick Radatz
1996	NESN	Bob Kurtz	Jerry Remy	Debbi Wrobleski	Bob Rodgers	
1996	WABU	Sean McDonough	Jerry Remy	Butch Stearns	Doug Brown	Rico Petrocelli or Dick Radatz
1995	NESN	Bob Kurtz	Jerry Remy	Kim Walden	Tom Larson	
1995	WSBK-TV	Sean McDonough	Bob Montgomery			
1994	NESN	Bob Kurtz	Jerry Remy	Amy Stone	Steve Burton	
1994	WSBK-TV	Sean McDonough	Bob Montgomery			
1993	NESN	Bob Kurtz	Jerry Remy	Amy Stone	Steve Burton	
1993	WSBK-TV	Sean McDonough	Bob Montgomery			
1992	NESN	Ned Martin	Jerry Remy		Bob Kurtz	
1992	WSBK-TV	Sean McDonough	Bob Montgomery			
1991	NESN	Ned Martin	Jerry Remy		Bob Kurtz	
1991	WSBK-TV	Sean McDonough	Bob Montgomery			
1990	NESN	Ned Martin	Jerry Remy		Bob Kurtz	
1990	WSBK-TV	Sean McDonough	Bob Montgomery			

=== 1980s ===
Year	Channel	Play-by-play	Color commentator(s)	Studio host
1989	NESN	Ned Martin	Jerry Remy	Bob Kurtz
1989	WSBK-TV	Sean McDonough	Bob Montgomery	
1988	NESN	Ned Martin	Jerry Remy	Tom Larson or Eric Reid
1988	WSBK-TV	Sean McDonough	Bob Montgomery	
1987	WSBK-TV and NESN	Ned Martin	Bob Montgomery	Sean McDonough
1986	WSBK-TV and NESN	Ned Martin	Bob Montgomery	Sean McDonough
1985	WSBK-TV and NESN	Ned Martin	Bob Montgomery	Sean McDonough
1984	WSBK-TV	Ned Martin	Bob Montgomery	Tom Larson
1984	NESN	Kent Derdivanis	Mike Andrews	
1983	WSBK-TV	Ned Martin	Bob Montgomery	Tom Larson
1982	WSBK-TV	Ned Martin	Bob Montgomery	Tom Larson
1981	WSBK-TV	Ned Martin	Ken Harrelson	Tom Larson
1980	WSBK-TV	Ned Martin	Ken Harrelson	Tom Larson

=== 1970s ===
Year	Channel	Play-by-play	Color commentator(s)	Studio host
1979	WSBK-TV	Ned Martin	Ken Harrelson	Tom Larson
1978	WSBK-TV	Dick Stockton	Ken Harrelson	Tom Larson
1977	WSBK-TV	Dick Stockton	Ken Harrelson	Tom Larson
1976	WSBK-TV	Dick Stockton	Ken Harrelson	Tom Larson
1975	WSBK-TV	Dick Stockton	Ken Harrelson	Tom Larson
1974	WBZ-TV	Ken Coleman	Johnny Pesky	
1973	WBZ-TV	Ken Coleman	Johnny Pesky	
1972	WBZ-TV	Ken Coleman	Johnny Pesky	
1971	WHDH-TV	Ken Coleman & Ned Martin	Johnny Pesky	
1970	WHDH-TV	Ken Coleman & Ned Martin	Johnny Pesky	

=== 1960s ===
Year	Channel	Play-by-play	Color commentator(s)
1969	WHDH-TV	Ken Coleman & Ned Martin	Johnny Pesky
1968	WHDH-TV	Ken Coleman & Ned Martin	Mel Parnell
1967	WHDH-TV	Ken Coleman & Ned Martin	Mel Parnell
1966	WHDH-TV	Ken Coleman & Ned Martin	Mel Parnell
1965	WHDH-TV	Curt Gowdy and Ned Martin	Mel Parnell
1964	WHDH-TV	Curt Gowdy, Art Gleeson, & Ned Martin	
1963	WHDH-TV	Curt Gowdy, Art Gleeson, & Ned Martin	
1962	WHDH-TV	Curt Gowdy, Art Gleeson, & Ned Martin	
1961	WHDH-TV	Curt Gowdy, Art Gleeson, & Ned Martin	
1960	WHDH-TV	Curt Gowdy, Art Gleeson, & Bill Crowley	

=== 1950s ===
Year	Channel	Play-by-play	Color commentator(s)
1959	WHDH-TV	Curt Gowdy, Bob Murphy, & Bill Crowley	
1958	WHDH-TV	Curt Gowdy, Bob Murphy, & Bill Crowley	
1957	WHDH-TV	Curt Gowdy, Don Gillis, Bob Murphy &/or Bill Crowley	
1956	WBZ-TV or WNAC-TV	Curt Gowdy & Bob Murphy	
1955	WBZ-TV or WNAC-TV	Curt Gowdy & Bob Murphy	
1954	WBZ-TV or WNAC-TV	Curt Gowdy, Tom Hussey, & Bob Murphy	
1953	WBZ-TV or WNAC-TV	Curt Gowdy, Tom Hussey, & Bob DeLaney	
1952	WBZ-TV or WNAC-TV	Curt Gowdy, Tom Hussey, & Bob DeLaney	
1951	WBZ-TV or WNAC-TV	Curt Gowdy, Tom Hussey, & Bob DeLaney	
1950	WBZ-TV	Jim Britt & Tom Hussey	Bump Hadley
1950	WNAC-TV	Jim Britt & Tom Hussey	Les Smith

=== 1940s ===
Year	Channel	Play-by-play	Color commentator(s)
1949	WBZ-TV	Jim Britt & Tom Hussey	Bump Hadley
1949	WNAC-TV	Jim Britt & Tom Hussey	Les Smith
1948	WBZ-TV	Jim Britt & Tom Hussey	Bump Hadley
1948	WNAC-TV	Jim Britt & Tom Hussey	Les Smith

== Substitutes ==
=== Play-by-Play ===
- Leo Egan (1970)
- Gary Thorne (1992–1993)
- Brent Musburger (1992)
- Bob Montgomery (1992–1995)
- Gil Santos (1992)
- John Rooke (1995)
- Steve Zabriskie (1996)
- Doug Brown (1997–1998)
- Don Orsillo (2000)
- Hector Martinez (1994–2001)
- Jon Rish (2010, 2014)
- Eric Frede (2010–2014)
- Josh Maurer (2015)
- Tom Caron (2016–present)
- Alex Faust (2019)
- Will Flemming (2019)
- Tom Helmer (2019)
- Mike Monaco (2019–present)
- Emma Tiedemann (2024–present)
- Rylee Pay (2024)

=== Color Commentator ===
- Jerry Remy (1992–1995)
- Dennis Eckersley (2003–2021)
- Dave Roberts (2009)
- Buck Martinez (2009)
- Tony Massarotti (2009;2022)
- Rance Mulliniks (2009)
- Rex Hudler (2009)
- Ron Coomer (2009)
- Ken Rosenthal (2009)
- Kevin Kennedy (2009)
- Dwight Evans (2009)
- Sean Casey (2009)
- Jim Kaat (2009)
- Gordon Edes (2009)
- Bob Montgomery (2009)
- Frank Viola (2009)
- Sean McAdam (2009)
- Brian Daubach (2009)
- Rick Dempsey (2010–2012)
- Gregg Zaun (2011)
- Roy Smalley III (2012)
- Peter Abraham (2012)
- Nick Cafardo (2012–2013)
- Peter Gammons (2012–2013)
- Jim Rice (2013)
- Rob Bradford (2013)
- Jon Rish (2013–2014)
- Derek Lowe (2013)
- Jonny Gomes (2017–2018)
- Mike Timlin (2017)
- Wade Boggs (2017)
- Jarrod Saltalamacchia (2017)
- Lenny DiNardo (2017)
- Todd Walker (2017; 2019)
- John Valentin (2017)
- Carlos Peña (2017)
- Ellis Burks (2021)
- Lenny DiNardo (2021)

=== Field Reporter ===
- Kathryn Tappen (2006–2011)
- Jade McCarthy (2010–2011)
- Tony Lee (2011)
- Jamie Erdahl (2013–2014)
- Jahmai Webster (2017)
- Tom Caron (2017–2019; 2022–present)

=== Studio Host ===
- Butch Stearns (1997–1998)
- Kathryn Tappen (2006–2011)
- Adam Pellerin (2013–present)

=== Studio Analyst ===
- Brian Daubach (2009)
- Tony Massarotti (2009)
- Gordon Edes (2009)
- Nick Cafardo (2009–2018)
- Ken Ryan (2009)
- Lenny DiNardo (2017–present)
- Jonny Gomes (2017)
- Jarrod Saltalamacchia (2017)
- Todd Walker (2017)
- John Valentin (2017)
- Manny Delcarmen (2018)

== Radio ==
=== 2020s ===
Year	Flagship Station	Play-by-play	Play-by-play #2	Color commentator(s)
2025	WEEI/WEEI-FM	Will Flemming	Sean McDonough	Will Middlebrooks Lenny DiNardo (select games)
2024	WEEI/WEEI-FM	Joe Castiglione or Will Flemming (when Castiglione is off)	Will Flemming, Sean McDonough or Tyler Murray	Lou Merloni (select games)
2023	WEEI/WEEI-FM	Joe Castiglione or Will Flemming (when Castiglione is off)	Will Flemming or Sean McDonough	Lou Merloni (select games)
2022	WEEI/WEEI-FM	Joe Castiglione or Will Flemming (when Castiglione is off)	Will Flemming or Sean McDonough	Lou Merloni (select games)
2021	WEEI/WEEI-FM	Joe Castiglione or Will Flemming (when Castiglione is off)	Will Flemming or Sean McDonough	Lou Merloni (select games)
2020	WEEI/WEEI-FM	Joe Castiglione or Will Flemming (when Castiglione is off)	Will Flemming or Sean McDonough	Lou Merloni (select games)

=== 2010s ===
Year	Flagship Station	Play-by-play	Play-by-play #2	Color commentator(s)
2019	WEEI/WEEI-FM	Joe Castiglione	Josh Lewin or Mario Impemba or Sean McDonough or Chris Berman or Dave O'Brien or Dale Arnold or Tom Caron	Lou Merloni (select games) or Rob Bradford (select games)
2018	WEEI/WEEI-FM	Joe Castiglione	Tim Neverett	Lou Merloni (select games)
2017	WEEI/WEEI-FM	Joe Castiglione	Tim Neverett	Lou Merloni (select games)
2016	WEEI/WEEI-FM	Joe Castiglione	Tim Neverett	Lou Merloni (select games)
2015	WEEI/WEEI-FM	Dave O'Brien or Joe Castiglione	Joe Castiglione or Sean Grande	Lou Merloni (select games)
2014	WEEI/WEEI-FM	Dave O'Brien or Joe Castiglione	Joe Castiglione or Sean Grande	Lou Merloni (select games)
2013	WEEI/WEEI-FM	Dave O'Brien or Joe Castiglione	Joe Castiglione or Jon Rish or Sean Grande	Lou Merloni (select games)
2012	WEEI/WEEI-FM	Dave O'Brien or Joe Castiglione	Joe Castiglione or Dale Arnold or Jon Rish	Lou Merloni (select games)
2011	WEEI (primary) or WRKO (back-up)	Dave O'Brien or Joe Castiglione	Joe Castiglione or Dale Arnold or Jon Rish	
2010	WEEI (primary) or WRKO (back-up)	Dave O'Brien or Joe Castiglione	Dave O'Brien or Dale Arnold or Jon Rish	Lou Merloni (select games)

=== 2000s ===
Year	Flagship Station	Play-by-play	Play-by-play #2
2009	WRKO or WEEI	Joe Castiglione	Dave O'Brien or Dale Arnold or Jon Rish
2008	WRKO or WEEI	Joe Castiglione	Dave O'Brien or Dale Arnold or Jon Rish
2007	WRKO or WEEI	Joe Castiglione	Dave O'Brien or Glenn Geffner
2006	WEEI	Joe Castiglione	Jerry Trupiano
2005	WEEI	Joe Castiglione	Jerry Trupiano
2004	WEEI	Joe Castiglione	Jerry Trupiano
2003	WEEI	Joe Castiglione	Jerry Trupiano
2002	WEEI	Joe Castiglione	Jerry Trupiano
2001	WEEI	Joe Castiglione	Jerry Trupiano
2000	WEEI	Joe Castiglione	Jerry Trupiano

=== 1990s ===
Year	Flagship Station	Play-by-play	Play-by-play #2	Color commentator(s)
1999	WEEI	Joe Castiglione	Jerry Trupiano	
1998	WEEI	Joe Castiglione	Jerry Trupiano	
1997	WEEI	Joe Castiglione	Jerry Trupiano	
1996	WEEI	Joe Castiglione	Jerry Trupiano	
1995	WEEI	Joe Castiglione	Jerry Trupiano	
1994	WRKO	Joe Castiglione	Jerry Trupiano	
1993	WRKO	Joe Castiglione	Jerry Trupiano	
1992	WRKO	Bob Starr	Joe Castiglione	
1991	WRKO	Bob Starr	Joe Castiglione	
1990	WRKO	Bob Starr	Joe Castiglione	

=== 1980s ===
Year	Flagship Station	Play-by-play	Play-by-play #2	Color commentator(s)
1989	WPLM-FM or WRKO	Ken Coleman	Joe Castiglione	
1988	WPLM-FM or WRKO	Ken Coleman	Joe Castiglione	
1987	WPLM-FM or WRKO	Ken Coleman	Joe Castiglione	
1986	WPLM-FM or WRKO	Ken Coleman	Joe Castiglione	
1985	WPLM-FM or WRKO	Ken Coleman	Joe Castiglione	
1984	WPLM-FM or WRKO	Ken Coleman	Joe Castiglione	
1983	WPLM-FM or WRKO	Ken Coleman	Joe Castiglione	
1982	WITS	Ken Coleman	Jon Miller	
1981	WITS	Ken Coleman	Jon Miller	
1980	WITS	Ken Coleman	Jon Miller	

=== 1970s ===
Year	Flagship Station	Play-by-play	Play-by-play #2	Color commentator(s)
1979	WITS	Ken Coleman		Rico Petrocelli
1978	WITS	Ned Martin	Jim Woods	
1977	WMEX	Ned Martin	Jim Woods	
1976	WMEX	Ned Martin	Jim Woods	
1975	WHDH	Ned Martin	Jim Woods	
1974	WHDH	Ned Martin	Jim Woods	
1973	WHDH	Ned Martin	Dave Martin	
1972	WHDH	Ned Martin	John MacLean or Dave Martin	
1971	WHDH	Ken Coleman	Ned Martin	Johnny Pesky
1970	WHDH	Ken Coleman	Ned Martin	Johnny Pesky

=== 1960s ===
Year	Flagship Station	Play-by-play	Play-by-play #2	Color commentator(s)
1969	WHDH	Ken Coleman	Ned Martin	Johnny Pesky
1968	WHDH	Ken Coleman	Ned Martin	Mel Parnell
1967	WHDH	Ken Coleman	Ned Martin	Mel Parnell
1966	WHDH	Ken Coleman	Ned Martin	Mel Parnell
1965	WHDH	Curt Gowdy	Ned Martin	Mel Parnell
1964	WHDH	Curt Gowdy	Ned Martin & Art Gleeson	
1963	WHDH	Curt Gowdy	Ned Martin & Art Gleeson	
1962	WHDH	Curt Gowdy	Ned Martin & Art Gleeson	
1961	WHDH	Curt Gowdy	Ned Martin & Art Gleeson	
1960	WHDH	Curt Gowdy	Bill Crowley & Art Gleeson	

=== 1950s ===
Year	Flagship Station	Play-by-play	Play-by-play #2	Color commentator(s)
1959	WHDH	Curt Gowdy	Bob Murphy & Bill Crowley	
1958	WHDH	Curt Gowdy	Bob Murphy & Bill Crowley	
1957	WHDH	Curt Gowdy or Don Gillis	Bob Murphy & Bill Crowley	
1956	WHDH	Curt Gowdy	Bob Murphy	
1955	WHDH	Curt Gowdy	Tom Hussey & Bob Murphy	
1954	WHDH	Curt Gowdy	Tom Hussey & Bob DeLaney	
1953	WHDH	Curt Gowdy	Tom Hussey & Bob DeLaney	
1952	WHDH	Curt Gowdy	Tom Hussey & Bob DeLaney	
1951	WHDH	Curt Gowdy	Tom Hussey & Bob DeLaney	
1950	WHDH	Jim Britt	Tom Hussey & Leo Egan	

=== 1940s ===
Year	Flagship Station	Play-by-play	Play-by-play #2	Color commentator(s)
1949	WHDH	Jim Britt	Tom Hussey & Leo Egan	
1948	WHDH	Jim Britt	Tom Hussey & Leo Egan	
1947	WHDH	Jim Britt	Tom Hussey	
1946	WNAC	Jim Britt	Tom Hussey	
1945	WNAC	Jim Britt or Tom Hussey	Tom Hussey or George Hartrick	
1944	WNAC	Tom Hussey	George Hartrick	
1943	WNAC	Tom Hussey	George Hartrick	
1942	WNAC	Jim Britt	Tom Hussey	
1941	WAAB	Jim Britt	Tom Hussey	
1940	WAAB	Jim Britt	Tom Hussey	

=== 1930s ===
Year	Flagship Station	Play-by-play	Play-by-play #2	Color commentator(s)
1939	WAAB	Frankie Frisch	Tom Hussey	
1938	WNAC	Fred Hoey		
1937	WNAC	Fred Hoey		
1936	WNAC	Fred Hoey		
1935	WNAC	Fred Hoey		
1934	WNAC	Fred Hoey		
1933	WNAC	Fred Hoey		
1932	WNAC	Fred Hoey		
1931	WNAC	Fred Hoey		
1930	WNAC	Fred Hoey		

=== 1920s ===
Year	Flagship Station	Play-by-play	Play-by-play #2	Color commentator(s)
1929	WNAC	Fred Hoey		
1928	WNAC	Fred Hoey		
1927	WNAC	Fred Hoey	Gerry Harrison	
1926	WNAC	Gus Rooney		

== Substitutes ==
=== Play-by-Play ===
- Spike Brown (1970)

== Spanish Radio ==
=== 2020s ===
Year	Flagship Station	Play-by-play	Play-by-play #2	Color commentator(s)
2022	WCCM / W279DH	Uri Berenguer		
2021	WAMG	Nilson Pepen		
2020	WAMG	Nilson Pepen		

=== 2010s ===
Year	Flagship Station	Play-by-play	Play-by-play #2	Color commentator(s)
2019	WCCM	Uri Berenguer	Juan Oscar Baez	
2018	WCCM	Uri Berenguer	Juan Oscar Baez	
2017	WCEC	Uri Berenguer	Juan Oscar Baez	
2016	WCEC	Uri Berenguer	Juan Oscar Baez	
2015	WCEC	Uri Berenguer	Juan Oscar Baez	
2014	WCEC	Uri Berenguer	Juan Oscar Baez	
2013	WWZN	Uri Berenguer	Juan Oscar Baez	
2012	WWZN	Uri Berenguer	Juan Oscar Baez	
2011	WWZN	Uri Berenguer	Juan Oscar Baez	
2010	WWZN	Uri Berenguer	Juan Oscar Baez	

=== 2000s ===
Year	Flagship Station	Play-by-play	Play-by-play #2	Color commentator(s)
2009	WWDJ	Uri Berenguer	Juan Oscar Baez	
2008	WTTT/WWDJ	Uri Berenguer	Juan Oscar Baez	
2007	WROL	Uri Berenguer	Juan Oscar Baez & Bill Kulik	
2006	WROL	Uri Berenguer	Juan Oscar Baez & Bill Kulik	
2005	WROL	Juan Pedro Villamán or Uri Berenguer	Uri Berenguer or Juan Oscar Baez or Bill Kulik	
2004	WROL	Juan Pedro Villamán	Uri Berenguer & Bill Kulik	
2003	WROL	Juan Pedro Villamán	Uri Berenguer & Bill Kulik	Luis Tiant
2002	WLYN	Juan Pedro Villamán	Juan Oscar Baez & Uri Berenguer	Luis Tiant
2001	WRCA	Adrian Garcia Marquez	Bobby Serano and Juan Pedro Villamán	
2000	WRCA	Hector Martinez	Bobby Serano and Juan Pedro Villamán	

=== 1990s ===
Year	Flagship Station	Play-by-play	Play-by-play #2	Color commentator(s)
1999	WRCA	Hector Martinez	Bobby Serano and J. P. Villaman	
1998	WROL	Hector Martinez	Bobby Serano	
1997	WROL	Hector Martinez	Bobby Serano	
1996	WROL	Hector Martinez	Bobby Serano	
1995	WROL	Hector Martinez	Bobby Serano	
1994	WROL	Hector Martinez	Bobby Serano	
1993	WROL	Hector Martinez	Bobby Serano	Mike Fornieles
1992	WROL	Hector Martinez	Bobby Serano	
1991	WROL	Hector Martinez	Bobby Serano	
1990	WROL	Hector Martinez	Bobby Serano	

== See also ==
- List of current Major League Baseball announcers
- Red Sox Radio Network
- List of Boston Bruins broadcasters
- List of Boston Celtics broadcasters
- List of New England Patriots broadcasters

== Notes ==
- During the 2013 season, Jerry Remy took a leave of absence after his son, Jared Remy, was arrested for murder.
- Red Sox color commentator Jerry Remy was off the air indefinitely during the 2009 season while he recovered from complications of cancer. NESN used guest analysts in his absence. Dennis Eckersley did the majority of home games and Dave Roberts did most of the road games.
- In 2000, Bob Rodgers replaced Bob Kurtz when he left to cover the Minnesota Wild. Tom Caron replaced Rodgers as studio host.
- From 1990 to 2004, Sean McDonough missed Red Sox games while covering events for CBS Sports and ESPN, making it necessary for the channel he was working for to hire a second announcer to serve as a fill-in. For games when Bob Montgomery served as the play by play announcer, NESN analyst Jerry Remy would serve as color commentator.
- Dave O'Brien misses Red Sox games due to his work on ESPN.
- Dave Martin joined the Red Sox radio broadcast crew in June 1972 when John MacLean left due to illness
- In 1970, announcers Ken Coleman, Ned Martin, and Johnny Pesky refused to cross the picket line of WHDH-TV's electrical workers. During the strike, Leo Egan called games on television and Spike Brown handled the radio broadcasts.
- Don Gillis filled in most for most of the 1957 season while Curt Gowdy was out with a bad back.
- The only game broadcast in 1926 was opening day
- Bill Kulik was only a part-time broadcaster
- Juan Oscar Baez joined Spanish radio crew in June after J.P. Villaman's death
- On July 25, 2008, WTTT swapped call signs with sister station WWDJ in Hackensack, New Jersey
- Jon Rish resigned during the 2013 season. He was replaced by Sean Grande and Lou Merloni
