= Joe Castiglione =

American radio announcer (born 1947)

- Born: Joseph John Castiglione; March 2, 1947 (age 79); Hamden, Connecticut, U.S.
- Education: Colgate University (BA); Syracuse University (MA)
- Awards: Boston Red Sox Hall of Fame; Ford C. Frick Award (2024)
- Sports commentary career
- Teams: Boston Red Sox (1983–2024) (Note: WEEI and Castiglione reached agreement for him to call a limited number of games, approximately 10, during the 2026 season.); Milwaukee Brewers (1981); Cleveland Cavaliers (1979); Cleveland Indians (1979)
- Genre: Play-by-play
- Sport: Major League Baseball

Joseph John Castiglione (born March 2, 1947) is an American retired radio announcer, best known for his 42 seasons announcing games of the Boston Red Sox of Major League Baseball. He has also been a college lecturer, and author. Castiglione was the recipient of the 2024 Ford C. Frick Award, presented by the National Baseball Hall of Fame and Museum, and is an inductee of the Boston Red Sox Hall of Fame.

== Early life and career ==
Castiglione was born in Hamden, Connecticut, and graduated from Colgate University with a BA in Liberal Arts. He was the radio voice of Colgate football and baseball while a student. He then received an MA in radio/TV from Syracuse University's S. I. Newhouse School of Public Communications in 1970. He also worked on the WAER-FM staff at SU. While at Syracuse, he worked a variety of on-air jobs for WSYR-TV (now WSTM-TV). He began his career in Youngstown, Ohio, broadcasting football games for $15 a game, and as sports reporter for WFMJ-TV in 1972.

Castiglione states that he was a New York Yankees fan as a kid, then closely followed the Pittsburgh Pirates because they were the closest to Youngstown, and likewise became an Indians fan after moving to Cleveland. His first major job as a sportscaster was in Cleveland, at WKYC-TV in 1978. In 1979, he called Cleveland Indians and Cleveland Cavaliers games, and continued sports reporting for WKYC-TV. He also called a handful of Milwaukee Brewers games for pay-cable channel SelecTV in 1981.

== Career with the Red Sox ==
Castiglione joined the Red Sox broadcast team in 1983, teamed with Ken Coleman. He admitted to not being in the booth when the ball rolled through Bill Buckner's legs in the 1986 World Series, as he was in the clubhouse covering Red Sox' seemingly impending victory celebration. After Coleman's retirement in 1989, Bob Starr became the lead announcer for the Red Sox. After Starr's departure at the end of the 1992 season, Castiglione became the team's lead radio announcer along with Jerry Trupiano. Castiglione became nationally known when the team won the 2004 World Series, with his broadcast of the end of the game. His jubilant "Can you believe it?" after the final out became a catchphrase.

During the 2007 season, Castiglione shared announcing duties with a rotating duo of Dave O'Brien and Glenn Geffner. With Geffner leaving for the Florida Marlins broadcast booth, Castiglione shared the booth with Dave O'Brien, Dale Arnold or Jon Rish in 2008. Dave O'Brien and Jon Rish were his partners from 2009 through April 2013. In 2011, Dale Arnold returned to be the primary fill in on Wednesday games. Starting in May 2013, Rob Bradford, Lou Merloni and O'Brien were his partners after John Ryder replaced Rish, with Merloni and Bradford stepping in for fill-in play by play duties. In 2011, O'Brien became the lead announcer with Castiglione moving back to the secondary announcing role. Castiglione handled play-by-play in innings 3–4 and 6–7 with O'Brien, and all innings when working with Bradford and Merloni.

In 2016, with O'Brien moving to New England Sports Network (NESN), the Red Sox television network, Castiglione began working with former Pittsburgh Pirates broadcaster Tim Neverett and once again was the primary game announcer calling innings 1–2, 5 and 8–9 on WEEI. In 2017, Castiglione and Neverett rotated games as the primary and secondary announcers.

On September 20, 2018, as part of a promotion called "A Rivalry in the Booth", Castiglione switched places with New York Yankees radio broadcaster John Sterling in the fourth inning. During the 2018 American League Championship Series (ALCS), Castiglione reacted to a catch made by Andrew Benintendi made in the ninth inning of Game 4. Castiglione fell out of his chair, and proceeded to finish the commentary with co-commentator Neverett after the incident.

For the 2023 season, Castiglione began working a reduced role, only calling 81 games as the primary announcer in order to spend more time with his family. He worked with Will Flemming and Sean McDonough as secondary announcers, along with former player Lou Merloni.

On September 15, 2024, Castiglione announced his retirement from the Red Sox' broadcast booth following the 2024 season. He stated that he would continue in an ambassador-type role for the team. Castiglione was honored by the Red Sox on September 29 with a pregame ceremony, as various players whom he covered over his 42 year stint showed up to pay their respects to his career. Pedro Martinez joined Castiglione in the radio booth, as he recalled the longevity of his career, and NESN honored Castiglione by simulcasting his WEEI broadcast on television during the top of the ninth inning. Castiglione ended his broadcast as he traditionally did at the close of each season since 1989, reciting a passage by Bart Giamatti from the essay "The Green Fields of the Mind".

"[Baseball] breaks your heart. It is designed to break your heart. The game begins in the spring, when everything else begins again, and it blossoms in the summer, filling the afternoons and evenings, and then as soon as the chill rains come, it stops and leaves you to face the fall all alone. You count on it, rely on it to buffer the passage of time, to keep the memory of sunshine and high skies alive, and then just when the days are all twilight, when you need it most, it stops."

== Post-retirement ==
Castiglione stated he was treated for a sarcoma in his right leg in October 2025 and was cancer-free as of April 2026. He broadcast approximately 10 Red Sox games during 2026 spring training, and agreed to broadcast approximately 10 games during the Red Sox' 2026 regular season.

== Awards and honors ==
In August 2014, Castiglione was inducted to the Boston Red Sox Hall of Fame, along with former players Roger Clemens, Pedro Martínez, and Nomar Garciaparra.

On July 28, 2022, Castiglione was honored in a pregame ceremony at Fenway Park for his 40 years of broadcasting the Red Sox; the ceremony included Roger Clemens presenting Castiglione with a plaque.

On October 22, 2023, the Baseball Hall of Fame announced that Castiglione was one of 10 finalists for the 2024 Ford C. Frick Award, presented annually by the Hall of Fame for excellence in broadcasting. Castilgione had also been nominated as one of the ten finalists in 2023, but the award was presented to Chicago Cubs broadcaster Pat Hughes. On December 6, 2023, Castiglione was named as the 2024 recipient of the award, and later accepted the award during the Hall of Fame induction weekend in July 2024.

== Other work ==
Castiglione has occasionally called college football and college basketball, most notably including games of Lafayette College and the University of Massachusetts Amherst, where he worked alongside his oldest son, Duke, who has worked as a sportscaster with WCVB in Boston.

Castiglione has worked as a lecturer in the department of Communication Studies at Northeastern University, teaching a course on sports broadcasting. Play-by-play announcers Don Orsillo and Uri Berenguer were among his students and broadcast booth interns. Castiglione has also taught at Franklin Pierce University in New Hampshire.

== Books ==
In 2004, Castiglione published a book called Broadcast Rites and Sites: I Saw It on the Radio with the Boston Red Sox. The book is a collection of stories from his days covering the Cleveland Indians and Boston Red Sox. It was updated in 2006 to include material on the 2004 World Series. In 2012, Castiglione returned to writing with a second book entitled Can You Believe It? 30 Years of Insider Stories with the Boston Red Sox. In this book, he takes the reader back to the 2004 ALCS with the Yankees and that year's World Series as well as the team's return to glory in 2007. However, much of the book is about the 30 years that Castiglione spent in the broadcast booth and the personal relationships he built up over that time, woven into the ups and downs in Red Sox history.
