= Jon Rish =

American former radio personality (born 1973)

Jon Rish (born c.1973) is an American former radio personality, best known for his work in the Boston area.

== Career ==
Rish was a radio host for WEEI-FM in Boston.

Rish attended Boston College and began his sportscasting experience on WZBC, the school's 1000-watt FM radio station broadcasting to the Greater Boston area.

Rish's broadcasting career began in 1993, when he was an intern on Boston sports radio host Dale Arnold's WEEI program. He subsequently broadcast college sports on several Boston-area stations. From 2006 to 2012, Rish hosted the Boston Red Sox pre and post game show on the Boston Red Sox Radio Network. Rish served in the Red Sox broadcast booth alongside Joe Castiglione since 2008, sharing time with Dale Arnold and Dave O'Brien. Arnold and Rish replaced Glenn Geffner, who left after the 2007 season for the Florida Marlins radio booth. Rish primarily announced games when O'Brien was away on assignment for ESPN.

On June 10, 2010, Rish filled in on the NESN TV broadcast for Don Orsillo who fell ill just before the start of the Red Sox game at Cleveland.

On April 8, 2013, after being asked to take a major pay cut by WEEI owner Entercom, Rish announced that he was leaving not only WEEI but the radio business as well, saying he had been "accepted into a training program to become a software developer and will begin that career path." His last assignment for Red Sox Radio Network was for the game between the Oakland Athletics and the Red Sox on April 24, 2013.

In August 2013, Rish was chosen by NESN to serve as a substitute color analyst for Boston Red Sox games while regular analyst Jerry Remy was on leave following the arrest of his son, Jared Remy, for murder. Rish also served as substitute Boston Red Sox play-by-play announcer on NESN in July 2014 while regular announcer Don Orsillo was on vacation.
