= Uri Berenguer =

American sports commentator (born 1982)

Uri Berenguer-Ramos (born 1982) is a Panamanian–American sports announcer who was a play-by-play announcer for the Boston Red Sox Spanish Beisbol Network from 2000 to 2020. Berenguer joined the Spanish Beisbol Network in 2000 as a statistician, engineer, pregame and postgame host, and play-by-play announcer. He had previously worked as a statistician for WEEI and in the Red Sox community relations office. He was mentored by Joe Castiglione, whom he met while a patient at Dana-Farber. They became friends, and years later, he credited Castiglione with helping him to become a broadcaster. At 21, he was one of the youngest full-time broadcasters in the history of the major leagues. In May 2005, Berenguer became the lead announcer following the death of broadcast partner Juan Pedro Villamán. In 2009, Berenguer was one of five announcers used by the MLB Network to call the Caribbean Series.

Berenguer was treated for histiocytosis at the Jimmy Fund Clinic at Dana–Farber Cancer Institute from 1985 to 2001. He is a graduate of the Boston Latin Academy and Northeastern University. He was a member of Latin Academy's baseball, football and track teams. His uncle Juan Berenguer played in the major leagues from 1978 to 1992.

On August 6, 2010, Uri made his TV debut alongside Jade McCarthy on NESN Daily. But on November 12, 2010, NESN announced that due to the lack of chemistry with Jade McCarthy and the low ratings of the show, he had been removed as co-host of NESN Daily.
