= Héctor Martínez (baseball announcer) =

Baseball player and announcer

Héctor Martínez is a former Major League Baseball player who was the first play-by-play announcer for the Boston Red Sox Spanish Beisbol Network.

Martinez joined the Red Sox in 1990 when the Sox became the tenth team in Major League Baseball to offer a Spanish-language broadcast. He remained with the Red Sox until 2001 when he was replaced by ESPN announcer Adrian Garcia Marquez. Martinez also called games nationally for ESPN and NBC, including the 1994 Major League Baseball All-Star Game. Before joining the Red Sox, Martinez served as a news and sports reporter for WUNR radio in Boston and play-by-play announcer for amateur baseball in Hartford.
