= Bob DeLaney (sportscaster) =

American sportscaster

- Born: Robert Joseph DeLaney; April 21, 1924; Elmira, New York, U.S.
- Died: November 25, 2008 (aged 83–84); Queens, New York, U.S.
- Occupation(s): sportscaster and voiceover artist

Robert Joseph DeLaney (April 21, 1924 – November 25, 2008) was an American sportscaster.

A 1942 graduate of Elmira Free Academy, DeLaney served in the United States Army in the Pacific theater during World War II, stationed in New Caledonia. After returning to the States, he attended Syracuse University and worked with radio station WFBL in Syracuse. When the Boston Red Sox and Boston Braves decided to separate their radio coverage in 1951, Curt Gowdy, Tom Hussey and DeLaney were hired to call Red Sox games on WHDH. At the end of the 1954 season, DeLaney was hired to replace Ernie Harwell on New York Giants broadcasts. When the Giants moved to San Francisco in 1958, DeLaney was replaced by local announcer Lon Simmons.

After his stint with the Giants, DeLaney was hired as the announcer for live commercials for Atlantic Refining Company during New York Yankees games, a job he held for ten seasons. In April 1959, DeLaney became the announcer for John F. Kennedy's presidential campaign.

After the election, DeLaney worked as a television sports host in New York City from 1962 to 1968 on WPIX and called the Ivy League Football Game of the Week on radio from 1964 to 1968. During the 1970s he served as narrator for the NFL Films Game of the Week, a disc jockey at WFAS in White Plains, New York, and a freelance commercial voiceover artist.

He died on November 25, 2008, from complications of a stroke at St. John's Queens Hospital.
