= MASN =

American regional sports network

- Type: Regional sports network
- Country: United States
- Broadcast area: Maryland; Washington, D.C. Delaware; Virginia; Eastern and central North Carolina; Eastern Panhandle of West Virginia; South Central Pennsylvania; Nationwide (via satellite)
- Headquarters: Baltimore, Maryland

Programming
- Language: English
- Picture format: 1080i (HDTV); 480i (SDTV)

Ownership
- Owner: Baltimore Orioles

History
- Launched: April 4, 2005 (21 years ago)

Links
- Website: www.masnsports.com

Availability

Streaming media
- DirecTV Stream: 640
- FuboTV: Internet Protocol Television

Mid-Atlantic Sports Network (MASN) is an American regional sports network wholly-owned by the Baltimore Orioles. Headquartered in Baltimore, Maryland, the channel broadcasts regional coverage of sports events in the Washington, D.C., and Baltimore metropolitan areas.

MASN is available on approximately 23 cable and fiber-optic television providers in Maryland, the District of Columbia, Virginia, eastern and central North Carolina, West Virginia, south central Pennsylvania and Delaware (on providers such as Comcast, Cox Communications, RCN, Mediacom, and Verizon Fios, covering an area stretching from Harrisburg, Pennsylvania to Charlotte, North Carolina); it is also available nationwide on satellite via DirecTV.

== History ==
MASN's former logo used until 2026 which uses colors from both the Orioles and Nationals.

When the Montreal Expos relocated to Washington, D.C., in 2004 to begin play as the Washington Nationals in 2005, issues arose regarding television rights for the new franchise. The Orioles have had a sizable following in the Washington area since moving from St. Louis in 1954, and have claimed Washington as part of their home territory since the second Washington Senators franchise became the Texas Rangers in 1972. Since at least 1981, Major League Baseball had designated the Orioles' television territory as extending from Harrisburg to Charlotte. The Orioles agreed to share their home territory with the Nationals in return for the ability to air Nationals games on the Orioles' planned regional sports network, to be named the Mid-Atlantic Sports Network. Major League Baseball, which owned the Expos-Nationals franchise from 2002 to 2006, paid the Orioles $75 million for a 10% stake in MASN, with the Orioles maintaining a controlling interest of 90%. As part of the deal, the Nationals' stake in the network would increase by one percent per year to 33% over 23 years, at which point the increases would cease and ownership would be fixed at 67% Orioles and 33% Nationals. Under the arrangement, MASN paid the Nationals $20 million to broadcast their games in 2005, and were bound to renegotiate the amount they paid the Nationals based on the fair market value of the Nationals′ broadcast rights in 2012 and once every five years thereafter. With this settled, the Mid-Atlantic Sports Network launched on April 4, 2005.

The family of Lerner Enterprises founder Ted Lerner subsequently became part-owners in MASN after their purchase of the Washington Nationals in July 2006. The same month that the Lerners acquired minority interest in MASN, the network, which originally broadcast only during Orioles and Nationals games, converted into a 24-hour channel with an expanded roster of collegiate sports events and local and national programming. It has become a competitor to the area's dominant regional sports network, Comcast SportsNet Mid-Atlantic, now known as Monumental Sports Network.

On March 3, 2025, the Orioles and Nationals reached a settlement to end the teams dispute over television rights fee payments. MASN, which is owned and operated by the Orioles but airs both teams games, pays rights fees to the Nationals. Through the settlement, the Nationals' agreement with the Orioles and MASN ceased after the 2025 season.

== Programming ==
As a whole, the Mid-Atlantic Sports Network televises more than 600 professional and NCAA Division I collegiate events annually.

=== Orioles and Nationals telecasts ===
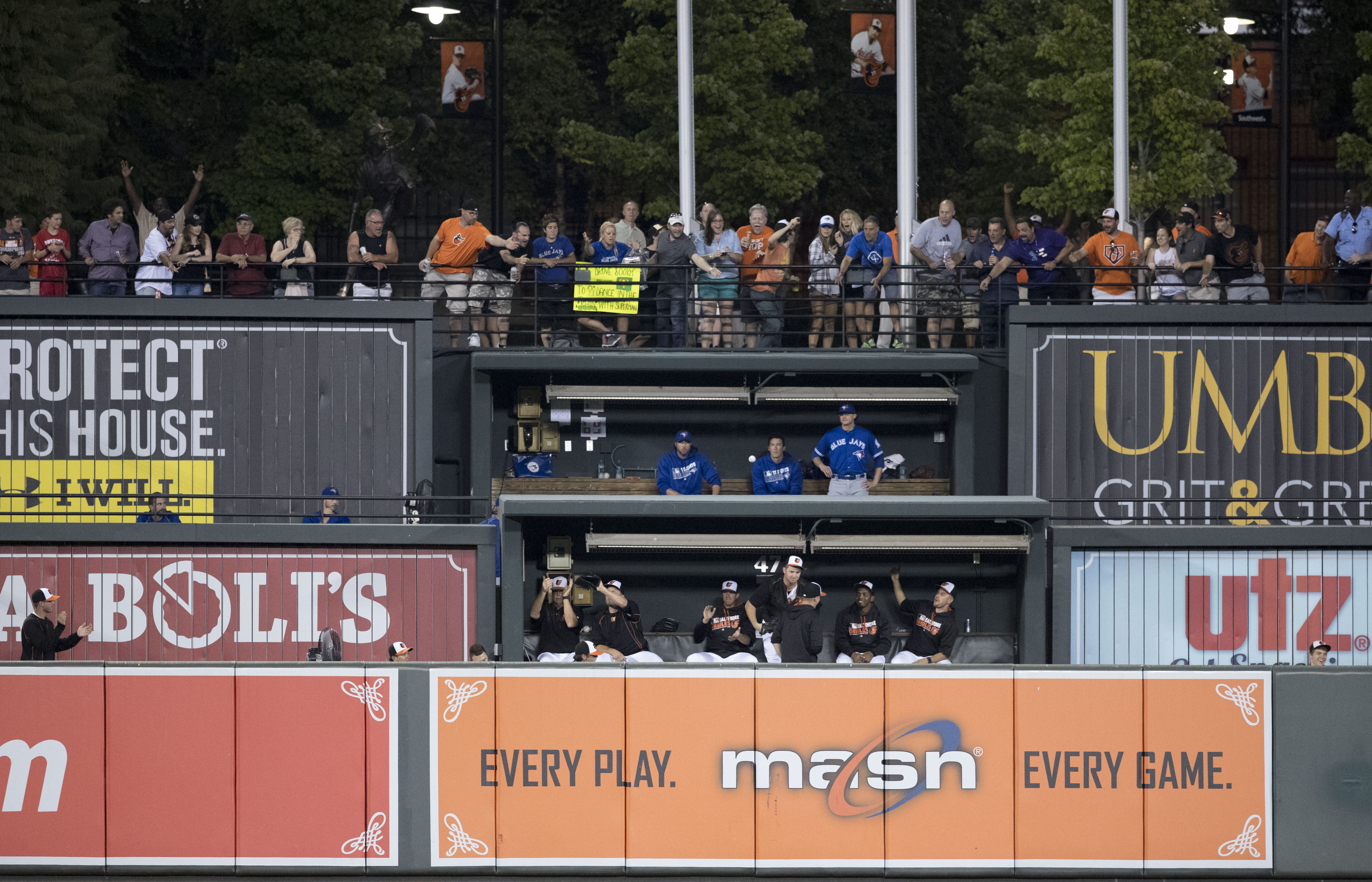
MASN advertisement at Oriole Park at Camden Yards

The network carries live telecasts of all Orioles games that are not televised by a national broadcast or cable network, and produces the pre-game and post-game show O's Xtra, which bookend the game telecasts. Before the 2026 season, corresponding Nationals games and Nats Xtra shows were produced. As with all Major League Baseball broadcasts, MASN-produced games are available for streaming out of the teams' respective territories at MLB.tv, with local viewers able to watch highlights for a certain amount of time following the conclusion of each game.

Because the Orioles and Nationals play many games at or around the same time of day, MASN operated a second network, MASN2, which served as an overflow channel when there were scheduling conflicts. Every cable and satellite provider that receives MASN received MASN2 as well when MASN2 was still operating.

For the 2026 season, Nationals broadcasts no longer aired on MASN, instead airing on the league produced Nationals.tv.

==== Production history ====
Through the 2017 season, MASN also produced over-the-air television broadcasts of Nationals and Orioles games for television stations in their respective primary markets – producing Nationals games seen on CBS affiliate WUSA-TV (channel 9) in Washington and Orioles games seen on CBS owned-and-operated station WJZ-TV (channel 13) in Baltimore. Those games were shown on MASN in all of the network's territory, including the Baltimore and Washington markets.

From 2008 through 2013, MASN used five broadcasters to provide simultaneous coverage of the annual Beltway Series between the Orioles and the Nationals, using the network's on-air staffs in an unconventional "mixed-booth" arrangement whenever the Orioles and Nationals played one another. Each team was represented by a color analyst and two sideline reporters for their respective telecasts, with play-by-play announcers each broadcasting for half of the game. The games were simulcast on both MASN channels (MASN and MASN2). Beginning in 2014, MASN dropped the mixed-booth format and returned to producing separate Orioles and Nationals broadcasts for the games as normal.

Due to the COVID-19 pandemic, MASN did not send its commentators to away games since the 2020 Major League Baseball season, with all games being broadcast remotely from booths at Camden Yards or Nationals Park. This persisted into the beginning of the 2022 season, even with almost all other MLB broadcasters having transitioned back to on-site broadcasts; a MASN spokesperson stated that "The global pandemic required all of us to learn new lessons in innovation, resourcefulness, and resilience. MASN is carrying forward some of those lessons." The remark was interpreted by a Washington Post writer as an implication that this was for budgetary reasons. On April 26, it was reported that MASN had reversed the decision.

=== College sports ===
The network televises collegiate sporting events each year from NCAA Division I teams, especially men's and women's basketball, but also football, soccer, field hockey, softball, baseball and lacrosse.

MASN airs select home men's and women's basketball games from the University of Richmond (Richmond), Virginia Commonwealth University (VCU), George Mason University (George Mason) and the University of Maryland, Baltimore County (UMBC), as well as select Richmond home football games. The network also airs select football and basketball contests from the Division II Mountain East Conference. Other local universities that have partnered with MASN over the years include Georgetown University, Liberty University, Loyola University Maryland, George Washington University, University of North Carolina at Charlotte, and Mount St. Mary's University.

MASN served as an affiliate for the American Sports Network, a provider of syndicated sporting events primarily focused on college sports, until it became Stadium and stopped syndication in 2017. The network also aired syndicated telecasts of college football and basketball from a multitude of conferences, including the ACC, America East, American, Big 12, Big East, Big South, Big Ten, CAA, MAAC, NEC, Pac-12, Patriot League, SEC, and WAC. Many of these telecasts were produced by either ESPN Regional Television or Fox Sports Networks. Most of these conferences have since ceased broadcast distribution to regional sports networks.

=== Other programming ===
In 2010, MASN relaunched The John Riggins Show, a daily sports talk show hosted by the Washington Redskins hall of famer, who was previously with the network from 2006 to 2008. In addition to an afternoon drive program, Riggins hosted Riggo's Postgame Xtra, which aired after each Redskins game.

In addition to nationally distributed college sports events, MASN carries other national programming including golf, outdoor programs, horse racing, and poker.

In 2025, MASN began airing games featuring the Minor League affiliates of the Nationals and Orioles, specifically the Norfolk Tides, Rochester Red Wings, Fredericksburg Nationals, Delmarva Shorebirds, Wilmington Blue Rocks and Aberdeen IronBirds. The Nationals affiliates stopped airing on MASN at the conclusion of the 2025 season.

=== Former programming ===
==== Baltimore Ravens ====
From 2006 to 2009, MASN served as the official regional cable broadcaster of the NFL's Baltimore Ravens, televising the team's preseason games, as well as nightly airings of team-related programming (including Ravens Xtra, 1 Winning Drive, The John Harbaugh Show, Ravens Report, Game Plan and Purple Passion) and original live post-game shows during the regular season.

==== Washington Nationals ====
From the team's move to D.C. through the 2025 MLB season, MASN produced and aired all non-nationally televised games for the Washington franchise. The teams 2005 relocation was contingent on the then-majority-Orioles-owned MASN holding the Nationals TV rights. This agreement ended after the 2025 season, with rights for the Nationals eventually being centralized under MLB Local Media. Pre- and post-game shows for the Nationals ceased airing on MASN for the 2026 season.

== Other services ==
=== MASN2 ===
The network also had a companion channel, MASN2, that aired overflow games in order to accommodate both baseball teams' schedules. The channel shut down on March 3, 2026, after the Washington Nationals left in favor of MLB Local Media.

=== High definition ===
MASNHD is a high definition simulcast feed of MASN, which broadcasts in the 1080i resolution format. MASN announced that it would launch a full-time HD feed on September 16, 2008, and televise 200 Major League Baseball games in HD in 2009. Since 2010, MASN and MASN2 have televised every Orioles game not aired on national television in high definition, and they have televised every Nationals game not aired on national television in high definition up to the end of the 2025 Nationals season. In 2012, all sports telecasts on the network began to be letterboxed on the network's standard definition feed via the No. 10 Active Format Description tag format, with graphics framed for 16:9 widescreen displays rather than the 4:3 safe area; games produced by MASN on WDCW and WJZ-TV utilize 4:3-optimized graphics to accommodate standard definition viewers.

== Controversies ==
=== Carriage controversies ===
==== Comcast ====
After the Orioles agreed to share their television territory with the Nationals, another controversy arose with television rights. Comcast Sports Net Mid-Atlantic, the Orioles' cable partner since 1984, dating back to its days as Home Team Sports (which until 2000, was formerly co-owned with WJZ-TV under Group W and later CBS) maintained a ten-year cable television contract to broadcast Orioles games through the 2006 season. When MASN announced plans to move Orioles broadcasts to MASN, CSN Mid-Atlantic (by then, a wholly owned subsidiary of Comcast) sued the Orioles seeking enforcement of a clause in its contract with the team, which Comcast SportsNet claimed allowed them the exclusive right of first and last refusal on future television contracts. MASN and the Orioles, however, claimed that MASN is a trade name for TCR Sports Broadcasting Holding, which was established in 1996 to sell all of the Orioles television rights, which resulted in the sale of the ten-year deal to HTS. Because of this, the Orioles and MASN claimed to be simply bringing their rights in-house.

On July 27, 2005, after argument by Baltimore attorney Arnold M. Weiner, Montgomery County Circuit Judge Durke G. Thompson threw out Comcast's lawsuit, ruling that the clause in Comcast's contract with the Orioles had not been triggered. Comcast filed an amended complaint and on October 5, Judge Thompson threw out Comcast's second effort.

Up to that point, Comcast was the only major cable carrier that refused to carry MASN. However, as Comcast is the dominant cable provider in most of the Nationals and Orioles territory—including Baltimore and Washington themselves—this left most Nationals fans unable to see games without satellite. Additionally, Adelphia Communications – then in the middle of bankruptcy proceedings and therefore unable to reach new carriage deals – was in the process of being sold to Comcast and Time Warner Cable on a piecemeal basis. On August 4, 2006, following a settlement, it was announced that Comcast would carry MASN starting that September. Comcast was forced to drop its lawsuit under the terms of the deal. This cleared the way for the Orioles to move their games to MASN for the 2007 season.

In August 2008, MASN made a carriage complaint to the Federal Communications Commission after negotiations with Comcast did not result in a new contractual agreement. On December 23, 2009, Comcast and MASN finally settled their dispute over these systems, with the cable provider announcing plans to carry the network on systems that were not carrying it already "as early as 2010". The FCC complaint was dismissed that same day. On March 23, 2010, MASN announced that Comcast would begin carrying the network on its central Pennsylvania systems on March 31.

==== Time Warner Cable ====
Time Warner Cable, North Carolina's largest cable provider, never carried MASN on a basic cable tier on its North Carolina systems. This has resulted in the network airing a series of radio advertisements in the area asking TWC customers to ask the cable provider to add the network. On January 21, 2008, an FCC arbitrator ordered TWC to add MASN on its North Carolina systems, citing an argument that the provider was not carrying MASN in an effort to protect its own regional sports network Time Warner Cable Sports. Time Warner Cable appealed the decision to the FCC. On October 30, 2008, the FCC's Media Bureau denied the motions filed by Time Warner Cable in its appeal, and ordered TWC to put MASN on the analog tier of its North Carolina systems within 30 days.

TWC filed another appeal for that decision, this time to the full commission. On January 16, 2009, the item was placed "on circulation" and remained there for almost two years. On December 20, 2010, the FCC voted 4–1 to grant Time Warner Cable's petition for review and reversed the Media Bureau's order. In the Memorandum Opinion and Order, it was revealed that in addition to offering carriage to MASN on a digital basic tier, TWC had "inquired into MASN's willingness to agree to carriage of MASN on an analog tier only in its Eastern North Carolina systems". This information seemed to expose TWC's apparent willingness to carry MASN on an analog tier on its systems in the Triangle and Wilmington areas, where the Nationals and Orioles are the only "local" teams designated by Major League Baseball. In the remaining home markets that are shared with the Atlanta Braves and Cincinnati Reds—including Charlotte and the Piedmont Triad—MASN would be carried on a digital basic tier, which is the same level of service where some Braves' games are carried.

However, MASN insists on analog coverage in all areas. As a result, Time Warner Cable refused to carry the network in North Carolina. MASN's North Carolina footprint is limited to a few small cable systems scattered across the state, mostly in areas that are adjacent to the Hampton Roads market and serviced by their cable providers. This situation has yet to change with TWC's acquisition by Charter Communications. However, Charter shut down Spectrum Sports, successor to Time Warner Cable Sports, in June 2017.

All games involving the Orioles are blacked out in most of North Carolina from many other outlets including MLB Network, TBS, MLB Extra Innings and MLB.tv.

==== Fibrant ====
Fibrant (now Hotwire), a municipal fiber "Internet service provider" that served Salisbury, North Carolina, carried MASN at one time, but by 2015 had removed MASN because MASN wanted to charge so much that Fibrant would have had to raise its subscription rates in order to keep MASN.

=== Washington Nationals coverage ===
==== Broadcast practices ====
Major League Baseball and Angelos struck the deal to create MASN only days before the beginning of the 2005 season, before the completion of arrangements for Washington-area cable television providers to carry MASN's two channels (MASN and MASN2).

Some Nationals fans contend that the majority ownership stake that Angelos and the Orioles hold in MASN leads the network to exhibit a bias in covering the Orioles compared to the Nationals, such as displaying the scores of Beltway Series games as "Orioles vs. Washington" – which critics see as sending a subtle message that the Orioles represent the entire Baltimore-Washington area, while the Nationals represent only Washington – as opposed to a more neutral "Orioles vs. Nationals" or "Baltimore vs. Washington".

==== Broadcast rights fees ====
When the amount MASN paid annually to the Nationals to broadcast Nationals games first came up for renegotiation in 2012, the Nationals asked for MASN to increase its annual payment to $118 million per year for the 2012 through 2016 seasons, while the Orioles countered with an offer averaging $39.5 million per year, arguing that the Nationals' request was well above fair market value and in any case unaffordable for MASN, and it began paying the Nationals that amount in 2012 pending agreement between MASN and the Nationals on a fee. When MASN and the Nationals could not agree on an annual amount, the Orioles and Nationals submitted the matter to Major League Baseball's Revenue-Sharing Definitions Committee for arbitration. The committee issued a written decision on June 30, 2014, that MASN should pay the Nationals an average of $59 million per year for 2012 through 2016. Claiming the decision was biased against the Orioles, MASN pursued litigation on behalf of the Orioles and itself to have the committee's decision vacated. With the matter tied up in the courts, the entire 2012–2016 period went by without a resolution of the matter, and the teams missed the next required renegotiation for the seasons from 2017 through 2021. The Nationals seek payment from MASN of over $100 million in fees each for the 2012–2016 and 2017–2021 periods, The Nationals and some of their fans contend that the delay in MASN increasing the rights fees it pays Nationals has had a negative impact on the Nationals′ revenues and their ability to sign expensive free agents.

The Washington Post reported that the animosity between the teams over this dispute may have played a role in the Orioles postponing two of a three-game home series against the Chicago White Sox, playing the third game without allowing fans to attend, and moving a subsequent series with the Rays to Tampa Bay due to security concerns during the civil unrest in Baltimore following the death of Freddie Gray in April 2015. The Nationals were in the middle of a long road trip at the time, so Nationals Park would have been available as a nearby venue on short notice. Baseball commissioner Rob Manfred had suggested that possibility earlier in the week.

An Orioles spokesman would not comment on whether the teams' dispute affected the team's rescheduling decisions, but another source with the team told the Post that it had. The Nationals said that neither the Orioles nor MLB had approached them about making their stadium available. However, they never made the offer themselves.

==== Broadcast team ====
In January 2021, MASN fired all of the Baltimore Orioles' broadcast team, except Jim Palmer, as well as some of the Washington Nationals' broadcast team, the pre- and post-game team Dan Kolko and Bo Porter and dugout reporter Alex Chappell, as well as reporter and broadcaster Byron Kerr. The Nationals released a statement saying the firing was "against our wishes" and the team was "incredibly disappointed", and raised their concerns with Major League Baseball. The Washington Post called it a "new front" in the feud between the Nationals and Orioles. In March 2021, Kolko was rehired by the Nationals organization and continues to contribute to Nationals telecasts.

== On-air staff ==
=== Current on-air staff ===
==== Orioles broadcasters ====
- Kevin Brown – main play-by-play announcer
- Scott Garceau – fill-in play-by-play (As of 2022, he is the main play-by-play announcer for the Orioles Radio Network)
- Geoff Arnold – fill-in play-by-play (As of 2022, he is the main play-by-play announcer for the Orioles Radio Network)
- Melanie Newman – fill-in play-by-play, main sideline reporter and fill-in O's Xtra host (As of 2022, she is the secondary play-by-play announcer for the Orioles radio network)
- Ben Wagner – fill-in play-by-play (As of 2024, he is the secondary play-by-play announcer for the Orioles radio network)
- Jim Palmer – main color commentator
- Ben McDonald – secondary color commentator and main O's Xtra analyst
- Dave Johnson – fill-in color commentator
- Brett Hollander – fill-in sideline reporter and O's Xtra host (As of 2022, he is the secondary play-by-play announcer for the Orioles Radio Network)
- Rob Long – main O's Xtra host

=== Former on-air staff ===
- Kristina Akra – Nationals sideline reporter in 2012
- Don Baylor – Fill-in commentator on Nationals and Nats Xtra broadcasts in 2007 (deceased)
- Bob Carpenter – main play-by-play announcer 2006–2025
- Alex Chappell – sideline reporter
- Ron Darling – Nationals color commentator in 2005
- Rob Dibble – Nationals color commentator (2009 – September 1, 2010)
- Mike Flanagan – Orioles color commentator (2010 – August 2011; deceased)
- Kevin Frandsen – main color commentator since 2022
- Johnny Holliday – Nats Xtra host, 2007–2018
- Jim Hunter – fill-in Orioles play-by-play announcer 2007–2019
- Dave Jageler – fill-in play-by-play announcer
- Byron Kerr – fill-in sideline reporter and fill-in Nats Xtra host
- Ray Knight – Nats Xtra analyst, 2007–2018
- Justin Maxwell – fill-in color commentator
- Michael Morse – fill-in color commentator and Nats Xtra host since 2018
- Tom Paciorek – Nationals color commentator in 2006
- Bo Porter – Nats Xtra analyst since 2019 – fired 2021
- Mel Proctor – Nationals play-by-play announcer in 2005
- Billy Ripken – fill-in Orioles color commentator/play-by-play announcer
- Jen Royle – Orioles sideline reporter
- F. P. Santangelo – Nationals main color commentator 2011–2021
- Don Sutton – Nationals color commentator in 2007 and 2008 (deceased)
- Debbi Taylor – Nationals sideline reporter from 2007 to 2011
- Amber Theoharis – Orioles sideline reporter
- Gary Thorne – Orioles main play-by-play announcer 2007–2019 (now fill-in play-by-play announcer for New York Mets since 2021)
- Julie Valentina – Nationals sideline reporter in 2013
- Mark Viviano – fill-in Orioles sideline reporter
- Dan Kolko – fill-in play-by-play announcer, main Nats Xtra host since 2019, and main sideline reporter since 2021
- Phil Wood – fill-in Nats Xtra host
