= Bill Mercer =

American sportscaster (1926–2025)

- Born: William Alfred Mercer; February 13, 1926; Muskogee, Oklahoma, U.S.
- Died: March 22, 2025 (aged 99)
- Occupation: Broadcaster

William Alfred Mercer (February 13, 1926 – March 22, 2025) was an American sportscaster, educator and author. He was a native of Muskogee, Oklahoma. He was inducted into the Texas Radio Hall of Fame in 2002. He was best known for covering shows for the Dallas-based professional wrestling promotion World Class Championship Wrestling (WCCW), as well as local Dallas-Fort Worth area sports broadcasts. He also provided notable coverage of the John F. Kennedy assassination.

== Personal life ==
During World War II, Mercer served in the United States Navy from 1943 to 1946 aboard the USS Rixey and USS LCI(G)–439 (Landing Craft Infantry – Gunboat) as a signalman. Mercer's ships participated in five invasions: Marshall Islands, Guam, Leyte, Luzon and Okinawa. He was included in the list of notable surviving veterans of World War II.

Mercer first attended college at Northeastern State College in Tahlequah, Oklahoma, after the war. He earned a bachelor's degree from the University of Denver in 1949 and a master's degree from North Texas State University in Denton, Texas, in 1966.

Mercer's granddaughter Emma Tiedemann is the play-by-play voice of the Portland Sea Dogs in Portland, Maine.

== Career ==
Mercer was best known as a play-by-play radio announcer for baseball, football, basketball and wrestling. He was also a news reporter for Dallas, Texas television station KRLD, covering the John F. Kennedy assassination in 1963. He and fellow reporters George Phenix, Wes Wise and Bob Huffaker wrote When the News Went Live about their experiences during that time. Following the assassination of President Kennedy, Mercer wrote Play-by-Play: Tales from a Sportscasting Insider, about his experiences in sportscasting. He had a stint as a sports anchor at KVIL radio station in Dallas-Fort Worth during the 1970s and 80s, alongside longtime morning host Ron Chapman. Mercer also spent over 35 years teaching new generations of sports broadcasters in the University of North Texas's Radio/TV Department. He was also recognized by the University of Texas at Dallas Athletic Department for his involvement with their live game broadcasts.

=== News reporter ===
On the day of the assassination of John F. Kennedy (November 22, 1963), Mercer was a news anchor and reporter with Dallas radio station KRLD. He covered the topic extensively from the field for KRLD, and was present at the midnight press conference of Lee Harvey Oswald. A reporter asked Oswald, "Did you kill the president?" and Oswald answered, "No, I have not been charged with that. In fact, nobody has said that to me yet." Oswald continued, "The first thing I heard about it was when the newspaper reporters in the hall (at this point, Oswald's voice cracked nervously) asked me that question." Mercer told Oswald that he had been charged. Oswald asked "Sir?" and when Mercer affirmed again that he had been charged, Oswald reacted with a look of astonishment.

=== Play-by-play sports announcer ===
In his 60+ year career, Mercer provided play-by-play broadcasting for several minor league teams: the Muskogee Giants of the Class C Western Association, then the Dallas Rangers (Triple A baseball) from 1959 to 1964, and the Dallas-Fort Worth Spurs (Texas League baseball) from 1965 to 1971. He then moved up to broadcast for major league baseball's Texas Rangers (major league baseball) in 1972 (with Don Drysdale) and Chicago White Sox in 1974. Mercer also provided play-by-play for University of North Texas (known as North Texas State College until 1961, and North Texas State University from 1961 to 1988) football and basketball from 1959 to 1994. His first broadcasts for professional teams began with the Dallas Texans (American Football League) in 1960 with Charlie Jones, then the Dallas Cowboys (National Football League) from 1966 to 1971. Initially, Mercer provided color commentary with Jay Randolph in 1965 for the Cowboys, then became the play-by-play announcer when Randolph moved to St. Louis the following year. In the 1980s, Mercer broadcast Southwest Conference football and basketball for Mutual Radio. In the 2000s, he assisted Mike Capps with play-by-play for Round Rock Express minor league baseball of the Texas League (currently in the Pacific Coast League,) and for three years with Scott Garner of the Frisco RoughRiders of the Texas League. While at KRLD-AM/TV in Dallas, he served seven years as color commentator for CBS Radio's annual broadcasts of the Cotton Bowl Classic college football game. Mercer is also noted for calling the "Ice Bowl," the NFL championship game between the Dallas Cowboys and Green Bay Packers in 1967, along with the Cowboys' second Super Bowl appearance in January 1972.

=== Wrestling ===
During his time at UNT, Mercer called games involving Kevin Adkisson and Steve Williams, who both became professional wrestlers under the names Kevin Von Erich and Steve Austin, respectively. He also was the announcer in 1959 at UNT when Abner Haynes broke the color line in Texas and later became a star with the second incarnation of the Dallas Texans (American Football League). Mercer provided play-by-play announcing for the internationally acclaimed World Class Championship Wrestling (WCCW), based in Dallas, from 1982 to 1987. Telecasts were originally shown on Dallas-Fort Worth station KXTX, Channel 39. He became a wrestling announcer in the 1950s in Muskogee, Oklahoma during the course of broadcasting all area sports for local radio station KMUS. By the late 1950s, he had relocated to Dallas and began calling televised wrestling matches at the Dallas Sportatorium and in the studio for KRLD-TV (present day KDFW-TV,) Channel 4. In early 1976, he took over announcing duties for the long running Saturday Night Wrestling program on KTVT, Channel 11, in Fort Worth, when original announcer Dan Coates retired.

In 2005, Mercer appeared in the critically acclaimed documentary Heroes of World Class. In 2007 Mercer appeared in the WWE documentary on World Class titled “The Triumph and Tragedy of World Class Championship Wrestling”

== Later life and death ==
In later years, Mercer co-wrote a book about his coverage of the Kennedy Assassination titled When the News Went Live: Dallas 1963. He also wrote a memoir titled Play-by-Play: Tales from a Sportscasting Insider.

On March 22, 2025, Mercer died, aged 99.

== Awards ==
- Texas Sports Hall of Fame (2020 inductee)
- Texas Radio Hall of Fame (2002 inductee)
- University of North Texas Athletic Department Hall of Fame
- Texas Baseball Ex-Pro's Baseball Hall of Fame
- Oklahoma Sports Museum, Guthrie, Oklahoma: The Bill Teegins Award
- Texas Intercollegiate Press Association Hall of Fame, April 2009
- University of Texas-Dallas Athletic Department Hall of Honor, 2011
- Namesake of the Bill Mercer Press Club at the University of North Texas's Apogee Stadium, awarded in 2012
- Muskogee High Athletics Hall of Fame (2014)
- Press Club of Dallas, Legends of North Texas Journalism Awards (2011 inductee)

== Bibliography ==
- When the News Went Live: Dallas 1963. ISBN 1-58979-139-8
- Play-by-Play: Tales from a Sportscasting Insider ISBN 978-1-58979-224-1
