= Bob Rodgers =

Bob Rodgers is a former sportscaster and producer who worked for the New England Sports Network from 1987 to 2004.

Rodgers joined NESN in 1987 as an associate producer. He became an on-camera personality in June 1993; co-hosting SportsDesk with Dawn Mitchell. In 1996 he became the host of the Boston Red Sox pre- and postgame shows. In addition to hosting, Rodgers served as a play-by-play announcer for NESN's coverage of the Pawtucket Red Sox and was the network's play-by-play announcer for the final six weeks of the 2000 Boston Red Sox season. Rodgers won the station's first EMMY award for the groundbreaking morning show, Sportsdesk. He went on to win 5 more EMMY awards including the 2000 award for Outstanding Play by Play (Pedro Martinez fires a 1-hitter at Tampa Bay) and in 2002 (Derek Lowe's no-hitter).

Rodgers was fired by NESN in March 2004 after he left spring training without permission to coach the Whitman-Hanson Regional High School boys' basketball team in the state tournament.

Although Rodgers continues his broadcasting work on a freelance basis, he has worked full-time in education since September 2004 serving as a high school English and communications teacher. In June 2011 he took over as the athletic director at Whitman-Hanson Regional High School in a suburb of Boston. He is the winningest boys basketball coach in the history of the school with more than 400 wins since he took the reins in 2000. Under his direction the Panthers have won 9 league titles, 3 sectional championships and a state title in 2020. The team also earned the states number one ranking and amassed a school record 35 game winning streak spanning two seasons including an undefeated campaign during the covid year of 2021. Rodgers was named the Four Deep Sports Talk boys' basketball coach of the year for the 2019-2020 and 2020-2021 seasons, an award given to the top high school coach in Southeastern Massachusetts. Rodgers has also coached basketball at Holbrook, Norwell and Silver Lake.

In addition to coaching basketball, Rodgers also coached high school baseball for many years becoming the youngest division 1 head coach in the state of Massachusetts in 1989 when he was hired to coach Silver Lake. He remained at Silver Lake until 2001. He then coached baseball at Cohasset high school briefly. He did not coach baseball again until taking over at Hingham High School in 2009. In his three years at Hingham the Harbormen won 2 league titles. He also finished the 2012 baseball season at Whitman Hanson when a coach resigned during the season.
