= Rylee Pay =

American play-by-play sports announcer

- Education: University of Nevada, Las Vegas
- Years active: 2023–present
- Sports commentary career
- Teams: Portland Sea Dogs, Tacoma Rainiers
- Genre: Play-by-play
- Sport: Minor League Baseball

Rylee Pay is a play-by-play announcer for the Tacoma Rainiers minor league baseball team. She is the first woman to be a lead broadcaster in Triple-A baseball.

== Early life and education ==
Pay grew up in Las Vegas, Nevada. She had a love of sports, particularly baseball, from an early age, and enjoyed sharing that love with her grandfather. She looked up to female sports broadcasters like Erin Andrews and Melanie Newman. She graduated from the University of Nevada Las Vegas, where she studied in journalism and media studies.

== Career ==
In college, Pay had a summer job as an emcee for the Wisconsin Rapids. The next summer, she got her start in sports radio as a sideline reporter for the Cotuit Kettleers in the Cape Cod Baseball League, where she also did some play-by-play announcing.

Even before graduating from college, Pay joined the Portland Sea Dogs, where she spent two seasons as the play-by-play announcer and media relations assistant; she finished up her coursework so she could graduate remotely. In 2023, she and Emma Tiedemann made history as the second time there was an all-women broadcast team in professional affiliated baseball. Pay and Tiedemann made history again in 2024, when they called six innings of a Boston Red Sox game from Fenway Park for NESN.

In 2025, Pay was hired by the Tacoma Rainiers, replacing longtime play-by-play announcer Mike Curto. She made history as the first woman to be a lead Triple-A broadcaster.
