= Emma Tiedemann =

American play-by-play sports announcer

- Education: University of Missouri
- Years active: 2013–present
- Family: Bill Mercer (Grandfather)
- Sports commentary career
- Teams: Portland Sea Dogs, Mat-Su Miners, Medford Rogues, St. Paul Saints, Lexington Legends
- Genre: Play-by-play
- Sport: Minor League Baseball

Emma Tiedemann is a play-by-play sports announcer, one of the original four female broadcasters in Minor League Baseball. She has announced for basketball, football, soccer, softball and volleyball games. As of 2021, Tiedemann works for the Portland Sea Dogs as Director of Broadcasting.

== Early life and education ==
Tiedemann grew up in the Dallas suburbs, the granddaughter of Texas sports broadcaster Bill Mercer, the first voice of the Texas Rangers. While in high school, she occasionally did play-by-play work at basketball with her grandfather for the University of Texas at Dallas. She enrolled at the University of Missouri and did sportscasting for KCOU, the school radio station. She graduated in 2015 with a bachelor's degree in secondary education and a minor in history.

== Career ==
Tiedemann's first professional job was as a play-by-play and color analyst for the Mat-Su Miners in the summertime Alaska Baseball League. She decided to seek more permanent work in baseball and applied to a number of teams, getting a job as the Broadcast and Communications Manager with the Medford Rogues in the summertime West Coast League. She was the team's broadcaster as well as communications manager. She worked as a No. 2 broadcaster, Broadcast and Media Relations Assistant, for the St. Paul Saints alongside play-by-play broadcaster Sean Aronson. In 2018, she became the Lexington Legends' primary play-by-play broadcaster while serving as their Director of Broadcasting & Media Relations. In 2018 she was also named the play-by-play announcer for Morehead State University's women's basketball team, the first woman to hold that position. In 2019, she was honored as the South Atlantic League Media Relations Director of the Year. In 2019, she said that she'd gotten to call a championship series in her first year with every team, although she first called a winning championship in 2018, for the Legends.

In 2020, she became the Sea Dogs' fifth lead broadcaster, having beaten out about 150 other applicants for the job. During her first day in March, the staff learned that they would all be working from home; the Minor League season shut down shortly thereafter amid the COVID-19 pandemic. Tiedemann spent her first work week studying baseball statistics, putting together game notes, and working on hiring a broadcasting partner for home games. In 2021, she was back in the stadium and on the road with the team. As a minor-league employee, she said in 2020, her work days can consist of "social media, pulling tarp, broadcast preparation, corporate sales, graphic design, selling tickets, being the mascot and many other things, all before that 7:05 p.m. first pitch."

On August 8, 2024, NESN announced that Tiedemann and Portland Sea Dogs broadcast partner, Rylee Pay, would be on the call for the Boston Red Sox game vs the Toronto Blue Jays on August 26. On August 26, 2024, Pay and Tiedemann became the first pair of women to call a Red Sox game. In January 2025, Tiedemann was named Maine sportscaster of the year for 2024.

Tiedemann says she has a traditional style since she learned the craft from her grandfather and listening to tapes of Red Barber.
