= Juan Pedro Villamán =

Dominican-American sportscaster

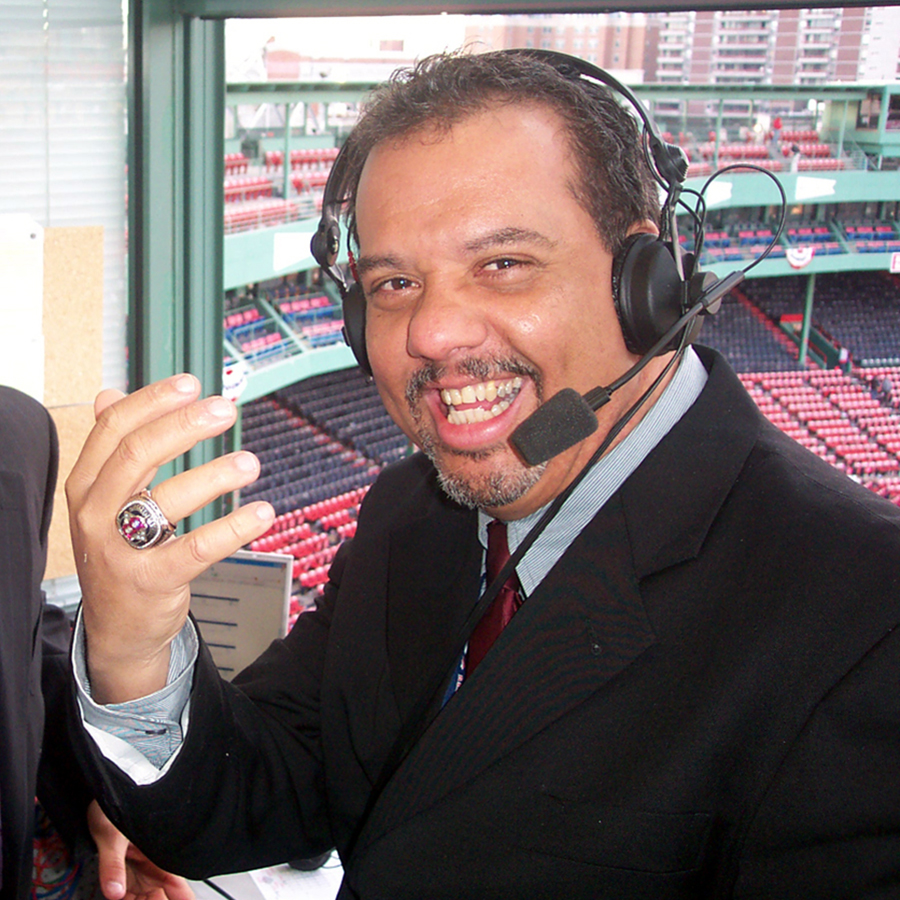
- J.P. Villamán in 2005
- Born: April 5, 1959; San Francisco de Macorís
- Died: May 30, 2005 (aged 46)
- Burial place: St. Mary's cemetery in Lawrence, Massachusetts
- Occupation: Dominican–American sportscaster

Juan Pedro (J.P.) Villamán (April 5, 1959 – May 30, 2005) was a Dominican–American sportscaster who served as the Spanish language play-by-play announcer for the Boston Red Sox.

== Early life ==
The youngest of nine children, Villamán fell in love with broadcasting at an early age. At 13, he called baseball and basketball games from a local radio station in San Francisco de Macorís, where he was born and raised by his aunt, Orfelina Villamán, after his mother died during childbirth. Like many Dominicans, Villamán played baseball and showed promise as a catcher. His best sport, though, was basketball, and played on the national teams in Panama and Puerto Rico.

Villamán came to the U.S. in 1986 and followed the in-migration pattern from New York City to Lawrence, Massachusetts used by thousands of other Dominican immigrants, followed by successfully landing a job with radio station WCCM in Lawrence in 1990. In 1994, he was recommended for the Spanish-speaking broadcaster job with the Red Sox, who were looking for a new radio venture aimed at reaching the growing population of baseball-mad Latinos in cities like Lawrence and Worcester. Villamán was hired as a part-time broadcaster by Bill Kulik, a former freelance TV sports producer and writer and baseball fanatic. For the next seven seasons, Villamán was the play-by-play announcer for selected Red Sox home games carried by small Spanish-language stations.

== Red Sox ==
The initially haphazard venture took off after Pedro Martínez joined the Red Sox in 1998. Villamán said that Pedro helped bring many Latino fans into "Red Sox Nation." Before the 2001 season, Kulik organized the Spanish Beisbol Network to carry every Red Sox game, home and away, and made Villamán a permanent Red Sox announcer alongside newcomer Adrian Garcia Marquez who also called games for ESPN Deportes. The radio show aired in Massachusetts, Connecticut, Rhode Island and New York. Villamán's Spanish commentary was also available on NESN, and baseball fans as far away as the Dominican Republic, Colombia, Costa Rica, Mexico, Nicaragua, Panama, Venezuela and Spain heard him via satellite. They would sometimes call into his pregame show, which pleased Villamán enormously. Listeners called him Papá Oso (Papa Bear) a nickname given to him by his friend and co-announcer Garcia Marquez.

In April 2005, at Fenway Park, Red Sox owners John Henry and Tom Werner presented Villamán, a broadcaster with a worldwide audience, with a diamond-encrusted World Series championship ring during his broadcast of the home opener against the New York Yankees. This gesture was a tribute to Villamán and his significance within the Red Sox extended family, which included around 500 individuals, ranging from ushers to players, who were also given rings. The presentation of the ring recognized the team's growing Latino fan base, which was drawn to the Red Sox due to top Latin stars such as Manny Ramírez, David Ortiz, Édgar Rentería, Pedro Martinez, Rich Garcés, and Orlando Cabrera.

== Death ==
On May 30, 2005, Villamán, aged 46, was on his way home at around 3:40 a.m. after broadcasting from Yankee Stadium over the weekend. He died when his sport utility vehicle sideswiped a truck, rolled down an embankment, and slammed into a tree on Interstate 93 near Wilmington, Massachusetts. He was pronounced dead at the scene. Portions of his funeral, held at St. Mary-Immaculate Conception Church in Lawrence, were broadcast live on three regional radio stations. He is buried at St. Mary's cemetery in Lawrence, Massachusetts.

== Sources ==
- "Red Sox News". Archived from the original on January 23, 2005.
- Media Blitz
- Noticiero Panamericano (Spanish)
