= Guerin Austin =

American beauty pageant contestant

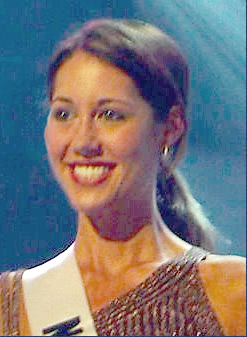
- Austin in 2004
- Born: November 30, 1980 (age 45); Omaha, Nebraska, U.S.
- Education: Oklahoma City University
- Height: 5 ft 10 in (1.78 m)
- Title: Miss Nebraska USA 2004
- Sports commentary career
- Team(s): Boston Red Sox, Boston Bruins
- Genre: Sideline reporter
- Sport: Major League Baseball
- Employer: New England Sports Network (2014–2020)

Guerin Elizabeth Austin (/ˈɡɛərɪn/ GAIR-in; born November 30, 1980) is a television host, model and beauty queen from Bellevue, Nebraska, who has competed in the Miss USA pageant. From 2014 through 2020, she was a sideline reporter for New England Sports Network (NESN), best known for her work at Boston Red Sox games.

== Biography ==
Austin grew up in Seattle, Washington, in what she called a "hockey family," and figure skated as a child. Her given name was her grandmother's maiden name. Austin graduated cum laude with a degree in Broadcast Journalism from Oklahoma City University. She was a Congressional intern for Representative Lee Terry, received an award from the Oklahoma Broadcaster's Association, and studied international media in London.

Austin won the Miss Nebraska USA 2004 title in a state pageant held in October 2003. During her reign, she spoke to thousands of school children and toured the USS Nebraska submarine and Camp Pendleton. It was her second attempt at the title, as she placed as a semi-finalist in the 2002 event. Austin represented Nebraska at Miss USA 2004.

Austin began her broadcasting career as a sports intern for KETV in Omaha, Nebraska, covering Nebraska Cornhuskers football and Omaha Mavericks men's ice hockey. In 2012, she won a Capital Emmy award for a documentary of the Washington Capitals season which she hosted. She worked as host of the Capitals Red Line program between 2010 and 2013.

New England Sports Network (NESN) hired Austin as a reporter in 2014, initially to report rinkside at Boston Bruins hockey games. She also became the sideline reporter for Boston Red Sox home games at Fenway Park. In June 2016, after the Red Sox made an extra innings comeback against the Chicago White Sox, Austin was caught in the crossfire of the team's exuberant Gatorade celebration, an incident covered by sportscasters around the United States. Several similar incidents occurred during her time covering the Red Sox. During the 2017 season, she suffered a concussion after fainting on a flight. After the 2020 baseball season, Austin's contract with NESN expired and was not renewed; Austin confirmed her departure from NESN in January 2021.

| Preceded by Jessica Perea | Miss Nebraska USA; 2004 | Succeeded by Jana Murrell |
