= Tom Caron =

American sportscaster

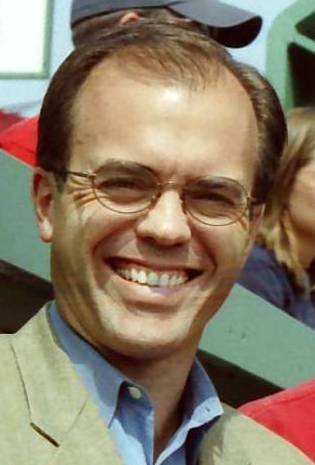
- Caron in 2004
- Born: November 17, 1963 (age 62); Lewiston, Maine, USA
- Occupations: Sportscaster, anchor
- Spouse: Kelley
- Children: 2
- Website: www.nesn.com/tom-caron-bio.html

Thomas Caron (born November 17, 1963) is a sportscaster and anchor on New England's NESN network. He is a co-owner of the USL League One soccer team Portland Hearts of Pine. He is the Co-Chairman of The Jimmy Fund.

== Biography ==
Caron is a graduate of Lewiston High School in Maine and Saint Michael's College in Vermont, where he majored in journalism. Caron lives in Framingham, Massachusetts, with his wife Kelley and their two sons Jack and Robbie. He is often called "TC" by his NESN co-workers.

In 2024, he spoke at the event marking the one year anniversary of 2023 Lewiston Shootings.

== Early life and career ==
After graduating, Caron took a job with a small newspaper in Vermont covering the Vermont Reds, Cincinnati's AA affiliate. He quickly left that job to take a job with WPTZ-TV in Plattsburgh, New York, where he covered the Montreal Canadiens and Montreal Expos. He later held a sports anchor job at WNNE-TV in Hanover, New Hampshire.

In 1988, he took a sports anchor job at WGME-TV in Portland, Maine, where he stayed for five years. In addition to his anchor duties, he hosted a weekly ski segment and produced a number of half-hour sports specials and hosted college and pro hockey broadcasts there.

In 1993, he left WGME-TV to become the inaugural play-by-play announcer of the Portland Pirates, the AHL affiliate of the Washington Capitals. The Pirates won the Calder Cup that first year, and Caron hosted and produced the playoff highlight video "No One Left to Beat." Caron also hosted a weekly hockey feature on WPXT-TV in Portland. Caron also provided play-by-play coverage for the New England Stingers of Roller Hockey International.

== NESN ==
Caron joined NESN in 1995, and has been with the network ever since. His first job for the network was hosting the sports magazine Front Row. He later served as the station's Boston Bruins studio host and Red Sox field reporter, and also did play-by-play coverage for the Providence Bruins and Pawtucket Red Sox, as well as college basketball and college hockey (including the Beanpot).

Caron currently hosts the New England Sports Network's (NESN) Red Sox coverage, including the Red Sox pre- and postgame shows. During the baseball off-season, he serves as the play-by-play of the Beanpot as well as the network's Hockey East broadcasts.

While reporting during a March 2023 spring training game for the Boston Red Sox, on NESN, a cat ran onto the field and into the home team dugout, where it jumped at him.

On the August 14, 2024 Boston Red Sox broadcast on NESN, Caron announced he was named co-chairman of The Jimmy Fund alongside former Red Sox player Brock Holt.

== Portland Press Herald ==
For more than a decade, until January 27, 2025, Caron wrote a weekly sports column for the Portland Press Herald and its sister newspapers, mostly pertaining to the Red Sox, Bruins, and New England Patriots. He called the time period “The Golden Age of Boston Sports.”

== Radio talk shows ==
Caron makes frequent guest appearances on sports talk radio station WEEI-FM to discuss the Boston Red Sox, and makes weekly appearances on 102.9 WBLM-FM ("The Blimp") and 101.3 WCPV-FM ("The Game") in Burlington, Vermont.

== Portland Hearts of Pine ==
In November 2022, Caron joined the group of investors trying to bring a USL League One soccer team to Portland, Maine. The USL granted Portland an expansion franchise in September 2023, to begin play in 2025. The team revealed its name — Portland Hearts of Pine — logo, and colors at an event emceed by Caron on April 27, 2024.

== Jimmy Fund ==
During the 22nd annual Jimmy-Fund Radio Telethon in August 2024 it was announced that Caron and former Red Sox All-Star Brock Holt would serve as the Co-Chairmen of the program made up of community-based fundraising events and other programs that benefit Dana–Farber Cancer Institute.

== Awards ==
Caron has won 12 New England Emmy Awards, a New York State Broadcasters Award, two James Ellery Awards (given for excellence in covering the American Hockey League), the ECAC Media Award. On March 29, 2014, Caron was inducted into the Portland Pirates Hall of Fame along with former Bruins goaltender Byron Dafoe, former Washington Capitals goaltender Olaf Kolzig, and Nashville Predators coach Barry Trotz. On October 2, 2018, Tom was the 27th recipient of the Hockey East Joe Concannon Media Award, given annually to the media member who demonstrates continued excellence in promoting and advancing the Hockey East conference in the media. On September 26, 2021 Caron was inducted into the Maine Sports Hall of Fame.
