= Bill Crowley (sportscaster) =

American journalist

William C. Crowley (born 1920 in Dorchester, Massachusetts, died December 1, 1996, in Needham, Massachusetts) was an American sportscaster.

Crowley called New York Yankees games (often paired with Dizzy Dean on the team's telecasts) from 1951 to 1952, and Boston Red Sox games from 1958 to 1960. A World War 2 bomber pilot with the U.S. 8th Air Force division, he served as a sports reporter for the Dayton, Ohio Journal-Herald, switching to Dayton radio station WONE in 1949. A year later he became the play-by-play announcer of the Dayton Indians of the Central League before leaping to Yankee Stadium in 1951. In between his time with the Yankees and Red Sox, Crowley worked at Holy Cross, where starting in the autumn of 1952 he was a radio announcer for Crusaders football and basketball games, economics professor, and was named Athletics Publicity Director in August, 1953. In 1961, Crowley left the Red Sox' broadcast booth to become the team's public relations director, a position he held until his retirement in 1985. He died on December 1, 1996, from liver cancer.
