= Jerry Trupiano =

American radio sportscaster

- Born: Jerome Michael Trupiano; St. Louis, Missouri, U.S.
- Education: Saint Louis University
- Sports commentary career
- Genre: Play-by-play
- Sports: American football, baseball, basketball, ice hockey

Jerome Michael Trupiano (born in St. Louis, Missouri) is an American radio sportscaster, best known for his former role as a play-by-play announcer for the Boston Red Sox. Trupiano is a graduate of Saint Louis University, where he began his broadcasting career as a disc jockey on the college radio station.

== Career ==
Trupiano hosted a talk show for fourteen years in Houston and called games for MLB's Houston Astros (1985-86), the Montreal Expos (1989-90), the World Hockey Association's Houston Aeros (1974–78), the National Basketball Association's Houston Rockets (1978–80), the National Football League's Houston Oilers (1980–89), Southwest Conference Football (1978–88), World League of American Football games for TSN (1992) and called games on the CBS Radio Game of the Week in 1991 before joining Joe Castiglione in the Red Sox' radio booth in 1993.

Trupiano called the Red Sox' 2004 World Series-winning game at Busch Stadium. The Red Sox radio team was forced to an auxiliary press box due to all of the media coverage and Trupiano called the game from the booth he had used for practice broadcasts decades earlier.

=== Departure from Red Sox ===
On September 27, 2006, the Boston Herald reported that Trupiano's contract would not be renewed and noted that Trupiano might end up with the St. Louis Cardinals. Trupiano denied that any talks with the Cardinals had taken place.

=== Later activities ===
On May 16, 2007, Trupiano was joined by his son Brian to call a game between the Brockton Rox and the Oil Can Boyd's Traveling All-Stars. The All-Star team featured retired major-league players Dennis "Oil Can" Boyd, Bill Lee, Marquis Grissom, Delino DeShields and Ken Ryan. The game was broadcast on a taped delay by two local public-access television stations.

Trupiano also worked as on Westwood One's broadcasts of the NCAA Men's College World Series finals in 2007 and 2008.

In August 2009, Trupiano returned to the air on a regular weekend sports call-in show on 98.5 The Sports Hub Radio (WBZ-FM) in Boston.

Trupiano is also the main sports anchor for Lexy.com, an audio social media startup in San Francisco. His responsibilities include coverage of the major college and sports leagues, as well as his own commentary feeds such as "View From the Booth" and "Dugout Daily."

In 2010, Trupiano signed on with Fox Sports to become the play-by-play voice of the Ivy League on Fox College Sports.

He is also an instructor at Young Broadcasters of America in Natick, Massachusetts.

== Family ==
Trupiano lives in Franklin, Massachusetts, with his wife, Donna, and two children. In 2006, his son Brian played for the Brockton Rox, then a team in the Canadian-American Association of Professional Baseball.
