= Bob Starr (sportscaster) =

American sports broadcaster

Starr

James Robert Starr (June 2, 1933 – August 3, 1998) was an American sportscaster.

== Biography ==
Born in Kansas City, Missouri and raised by adoptive parents in Oklahoma, Starr attended Coffeyville Junior College and then the University of Kansas, where he played football and baseball. He served in the army from February 1955 to February 1956 and was stationed at Fort Gordon, Georgia, where he was a private first class and played baseball. Following this, he had a three week trial with the Brunswick Pirates, a Pittsburgh Pirates farm team in Brunswick, Georgia.

He began his broadcasting career calling high school and college basketball in Illinois. Starr's first TV job was as a sports anchor on WMBD-TV in Peoria, Illinois, where he also broadcast basketball games for Bradley University. In 1966, Starr was hired by WBZ radio in Boston to call Boston Patriots and Boston College Eagles football games. In 1971 Starr left Boston to begin work as sports director for KTVU television in Oakland, California.

In 1972, Starr moved to St. Louis to work for KMOX radio and call games for the St. Louis Cardinals and Missouri Tigers football teams and the St. Louis Cardinals baseball team. In September 1975, Starr broadcast a Cardinals baseball game on a Friday night in New York, flew to Minnesota for a football Cardinals exhibition game on a Saturday evening, returned to New York for a baseball game the following afternoon, and then flew to Birmingham, AL to call the Missouri Tigers 20-7 upset of Alabama on a Monday night. "Really, I don't mind that sort of schedule at all. It's sometimes irritating, or frustrating when connections are tight and the weather is bad."

Starr would spend most of his career in Anaheim, California, where he called Los Angeles Rams football and California Angels baseball from 1980 to 1989. During his years in St. Louis and Anaheim, Starr also broadcast several football bowl games.

In 1990, Starr returned to Boston to replace Ken Coleman on Red Sox radio. Starr would spend three years with the Red Sox before returning to call Rams and Angels games. Steve Physioc would replace Starr on Rams radio network in 1994 and Starr would retire from Angels radio network in 1997. Starr died at his home in Orange, California, August 3, 1998 of respiratory failure and pulmonary fibrosis.
