= Tom Hussey =

American baseball announcer (1910–1982)

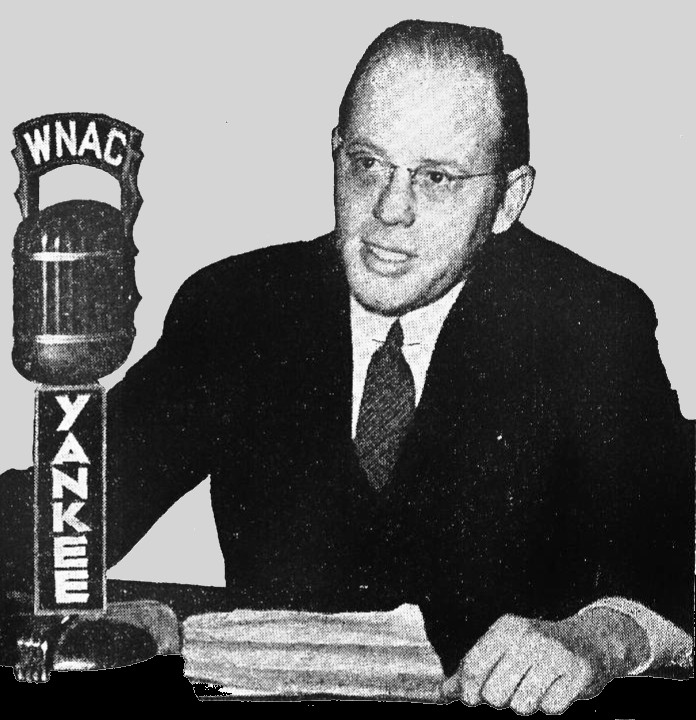
- Tom Hussey c. 1945
- Born: Thomas Goldsmith Hussey; November 10, 1910; Marblehead, Massachusetts
- Died: March 8, 1982 (aged 71); Vero Beach, Florida
- Education: University of Florida
- Sports commentary career
- Team(s): Boston Red Sox (1939–54); Boston Bees/Braves (1939–50)
- Genre: Play-by-play
- Sport: Major League Baseball

Thomas Goldsmith Hussey (November 10, 1910 – March 8, 1982) was a Major League Baseball announcer for the Boston Red Sox and Boston Braves.

== Early life ==
Hussey was born on November 10, 1910, in Marblehead, Massachusetts, the son of Thomas P. and Mildred (Goldsmith) Hussey. He graduated from Palm Beach High School in Florida in 1927, and then attended the University of Florida, where he graduated in 1931. His radio career began on Gainesville radio station WRUF, also in 1931. He married Margaret Hutchinson, also of Marblehead, on June 12, 1937. By that time, Hussey was already working as a sports announcer for WNAC radio in Boston, flagship station of the Yankee Network, as well as for its then-sister station, WAAB. When not on the air himself, he read commercials for other announcers, including Fred Hoey and Hoey's successor Jim Britt.

== Radio career ==
Hussey called Red Sox and Braves games from 1939 to 1950, first at WNAC/WAAB and the Yankee Network; and then, by the late 1940s, at WHDH. During his career on Boston radio, he was a secondary play-by-play announcer for home games and recreated road games off wire tickers. And when TV came to Boston, Hussey was in the booth, along with Jim Britt, to call the Boston Braves' first televised game in June 1948, on WBZ-TV. When the Braves and Red Sox separated their television and radio coverage, Hussey became exclusive to the Red Sox. He remained with the Red Sox until 1954. In addition to calling baseball games, Hussey also called college football at times. In addition, he spent several years as the host of an early evening sports radio program.

== Later years ==
In 1959, Hussey moved to Vero Beach, Florida, where he worked as a chemist for General Division Corp. He died on March 8, 1982, at his home in Vero Beach at the age of 71.
