= Debbi Taylor =

American sports reporter

Debbi Taylor, formerly Debbi Wrobleski, is an American sports reporter who has worked for the New England Sports Network (NESN) and the Mid-Atlantic Sports Network (MASN).

Taylor got her start in sports broadcasting at NESN, where she hosted the morning show, as well as doing feature interviews and reporting for Boston Red Sox games.

After six years at NESN, Taylor joined Sun Sports and FSN Florida, where she worked as a sideline reporter. She was also a sports anchor and reporter for WOFL and WKMG-TV in Orlando, where she covered the Daytona 500 and Super Bowl. From 2007 through 2011, she was MASN′s sideline reporter at Washington Nationals games, the first person to serve in this role.

Taylor has won two local Emmys and a national Emmy for her trip to Cuba and "The Friendship Games." She was honored by Red Sox legend Ted Williams by being one of only two women included in the "Hitters Hall of Fame." (The other was longtime Red Sox owner Jean Yawkey).

Taylor is a native of Nashua, New Hampshire. She is married to former Major League Baseball pitcher Wade Taylor and they have a daughter.
