= Butch Stearns =

American television and radio personality

Butch Stearns is an American television and radio personality. He is a former sports anchor for WFXT and radio host for WEEI-FM, both located in Boston, Massachusetts.

== Television ==
Stearns' first job in television was as a producer for Bob Gamere on WLVI-TV's Sunday night Weekend Scoreboard. In 1992, Stearns moved to Minnesota where he worked for KAAL-TV and as a sports anchor and producer of weekday sportscasts. He also hosted The Point After, a 30-minute Sunday show, and a one-hour Friday night broadcast that covered high school teams. From 1994-1996, Stearns worked for Detroit's PASS Sports.

Stearns returned to Boston in 1996 as a sports reporter for WABU. At WABU he was the field reporter for Boston Red Sox games, a color commentator for college football games, and the host of the Emmy award winning 68 Sportsnight. In September 1999, Stearns joined WFXT as a sports reporter and weekend anchor. He was promoted to main sports anchor following Levan Reid's departure in 2001. In December 2004, Stearns made an appearance on the NFL on Fox as a sideline reporter for the New England Patriots week 17 matchup at Gillette Stadium against the San Francisco 49ers. On November 1, 2009, Stearns was notified that his contract with Fox 25 would not be renewed.

Although he took a substantial pay cut, Stearns returned to Fox 25 in the fall of 2014 as a temporary replacement.

Stearns also hosted New England Sports Network's New England Golfer in 1997.

== Radio ==
Stearns' first radio experience came at WDFN in Detroit Michigan From July 1994 – January 1996 Stearns co-hosted The Morning Battery, first with former Major League pitcher Lary Sorensen and later with Detroit Free Press reporter Keith Gave.

After working as a part-time employee at WEEI, Stearns joined WNRB radio as the host of Patriots Monday and the radio play-by-play announcer for the New England Revolution. Stearns currently serves as the host of WEEI-FM's Saturday afternoon show.

== Internet ==
In 2010, following the expiration of his contract with WFXT, Stearns began hosting the show Sports Buzz which airs on the online media website The Pulse Network.

== Personal ==
A native of Braintree, Massachusetts, Butch graduated from Stonehill College with a bachelor's degree in business administration. Sometimes he is affectionately referred to as "The Mayor of Braintree." He is married and has three daughters.
