= Ken Coleman =

American sportscaster (1925–2003)

- Born: Kenneth Robert Coleman; April 22, 1925; Hartford, Connecticut, U.S.
- Died: August 21, 2003 (aged 78); Plymouth, Massachusetts, U.S.
- Education: Curry College
- Years active: 1947–89
- Relatives: Casey Coleman (son)
- Sports commentary career
- Teams: Cleveland Browns (1952–65); Cleveland Indians (1954–63); Boston Red Sox (1966–74, 1979–89); Cincinnati Reds (1975–78)
- Genre: Play-by-play
- Sports: Major League Baseball; National Football League

Kenneth Robert Coleman (April 22, 1925 – August 21, 2003) was an American radio and television sportscaster for more than four decades (1947–1989).

== Early life ==
Coleman was born in Hartford, Connecticut, in 1925, the son of William (a salesman) and his wife Frances. The family subsequently moved to Dorchester, Massachusetts, and then to nearby Quincy, where he was raised. Coleman graduated from North Quincy High School in 1943. He was a pitcher on the North Quincy High School baseball team, and subsequently played in the semi-pro Park League. But Coleman had dreams of being a sports broadcaster from the time he was a boy, when he enjoyed listening to the games on radio.

After serving in the U.S. Army, where he was a sergeant during World War II, Coleman took oratory courses for one year at Curry College, and then broke into broadcasting in Rutland, Vermont, in 1947, working for station WSYB. He called the play-by-play of the Rutland Royals of the Vermont Northern League, a summer collegiate baseball circuit akin to the Cape Cod League. Coleman also was a newscaster and a deejay on the station. He was hired by station WJDA in Quincy, where he worked as a sports reporter until 1951; he then worked for a year at WNEB in Worcester. During this time, Coleman was broadcasting Boston University football during the Harry Agganis era.

== Broadcasting career ==
=== Cleveland Indians and Browns ===
Coleman received critical praise for his college football play-by-play, which led to his big break: in 1952, he got the opportunity to broadcast for the NFL Cleveland Browns (1952–1965), calling play-by-play of every touchdown that Hall of Fame running back Jim Brown ever scored. He also began his MLB broadcasting career, calling Cleveland Indians games on television for ten seasons (1954–1963). In his first year with the Indians, Coleman called their record-setting 111-win season and their World Series loss to the New York Giants.

Coleman broadcast college football for various teams, including Ohio State and Harvard, as well as BU. He was the play-by-play announcer for the 1968 Harvard-Yale football game, a game forever remembered for the incredible Harvard comeback from a 16-point deficit to tie Yale at 29–29 in the game's last 42 seconds. Coleman also called NFL games for NBC in the early 1970s, and later in his career called Connecticut and Fairfield basketball games for Connecticut Public Television.

=== Boston Red Sox ===
In 1966, Coleman was named the lead play-by-play announcer for the Boston Red Sox on both radio and television, succeeding Curt Gowdy, who resigned after 15 years of calling Red Sox games to become the top play-by-play voice for NBC's Major League Baseball Game of the Week. Coleman joined a broadcast team that also included Ned Martin and color man Mel Parnell, and signed a three-year contract that paid him $40,000 per year. Coleman broadcast the 1967 World Series (which the Red Sox lost to the St. Louis Cardinals) for NBC television, working alongside Gowdy, and radio.

Coleman was the "Voice of the Red Sox" on both WHDH-AM 850 and the original WHDH-TV for six seasons, through 1971. When the FCC revoked WHDH's television license during the winter of 1971–1972, the Red Sox split their radio and TV announcing crews and signed a three-year contract with WBZ-TV. Coleman and color man Johnny Pesky worked exclusively on television through the 1974 season. In 1975, the Red Sox awarded their television rights to WSBK-TV and increased their telecast schedule from 65 to over 100 games, and the new flagship station opted for a new broadcasting team, Dick Stockton and Ken Harrelson. Coleman then returned to Ohio. From 1975 to 1978, he was the play-by-play man for WLWT and the Cincinnati Reds' television network, calling regular-season games for the Big Red Machine's back-to-back 1975–1976 World Series champions.

After the Red Sox' legendary radio combination of Ned Martin and Jim Woods were fired for failing to follow the dictates of sponsors following the 1978 season, Coleman went back to Boston in 1979 and spent 11 years as the Red Sox' top radio voice. He broadcast the Red Sox' 1986 World Series loss to the New York Mets and two Red Sox ALCS (1986 and 1988). Coleman remained in the Red Sox booth until his retirement in 1989. He worked with #2 announcers Rico Petrocelli, Jon Miller and Joe Castiglione during this "second term" with the Red Sox.

It was Coleman who was on the call on the Red Sox Radio Network when Red Sox first baseman Bill Buckner let a groundball hit by Mookie Wilson of the New York Mets go through his legs at the end of Game 6 of the 1986 World Series:

Knight at second. Three and two. The pitch... groundball to first base. Buckner...it goes by him! And here comes...the winning run! The Mets have won it...6 to 5 on a groundball to Buckner...that went through him...for what has to be an error! And Knight comes home. And the Mets are still alive! They are going wild in New York! As the New York Mets after the Red Sox in the top of the 10th inning, got two with two men out and nobody on...come back and get three and win it....win it...6 to 5 to force Game 7 tomorrow night. Game 7 tomorrow night! And we'll be back with a recap...in a moment.

In 1972, Coleman returned briefly to the NFL, rotating play-by-play duties with Stockton for New England Patriots' preseason games on WBZ-TV with no color commentators.

Additionally, he wrote books on sportscasting, was one of the founding fathers of the Red Sox Booster Club and the BoSox Club, and was intimately involved with the Jimmy Fund, which raises money for cancer research.

== Personal life and death ==
Coleman followed the routine of taking a swim in the Atlantic Ocean as often as he could through the late fall and into the earliest days of spring, until his death.

He was the father of the late Cleveland sports and newscaster Casey Coleman, who died in 2006 from pancreatic cancer.

Coleman was inducted into the Boston Red Sox Hall of Fame on May 18, 2000, at the age of 75. He died three years later, aged 78, in Plymouth, Massachusetts, from complications of bacterial meningitis.
