= Fred Hoey =

American baseball broadcaster

- Born: May 12, 1884; Boston, Massachusetts, US
- Died: November 17, 1949 (aged 65); Winthrop, Massachusetts, US
- Years active: 1925–1938
- Sports commentary career
- Team(s): Boston Braves, Boston Red Sox
- Genre: Play-by-play
- Sport: Major League Baseball
- Employer: CBS Radio, Mutual

Fred James Hoey (May 12, 1884 – November 17, 1949) was an American radio sports announcer who was the first full-time voice of Major League Baseball in Boston. Hoey called games for the Boston Braves from 1925 to 1938 and the Boston Red Sox from 1927 to 1938.

== Biography ==
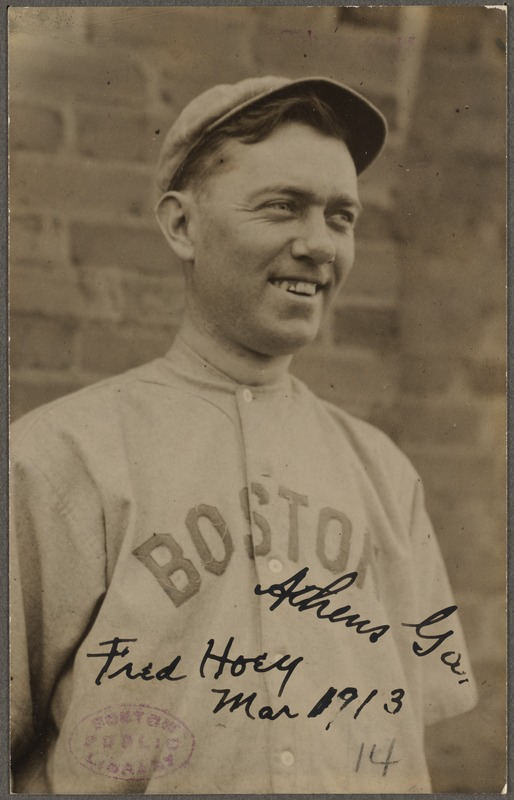
Fred Hoey, Athens, Georgia, taken in 1913 during Boston Red Sox Spring Training. Michael T. "Nuf Ced" McGreevy Collection, Boston Public Library

Hoey was born in Boston and raised in Saxonville, Massachusetts. At the age of 12, Hoey saw his first baseball game during the 1897 Temple Cup. Hoey would later play semi-professional baseball and work as an usher at the Huntington Avenue Grounds.

In 1903, Hoey was hired as a sportswriter, writing about high school sports, baseball, and hockey. In 1924, he became the first publicity director of the Boston Bruins. Hoey began broadcasting Boston Braves games in 1925 and Boston Red Sox games in 1927, becoming the first full-time announcer for both teams. Such double duty would be impossible today. However, in those days, the Braves and Red Sox almost never played at home on the same day. Like most teams, the Braves and Red Sox "recreated" road games in the studio using telegraphed messages from the ballpark rather than have Hoey travel for road play-by-play.

In 1933, Hoey was hired by CBS Radio to call Games 1 and 5 of the World Series after commissioner Kenesaw Mountain Landis declared that Ted Husing and Graham McNamee could not call World Series games because they did not call any regular season games. Hoey was removed from the CBS broadcasting booth during the fourth inning of Game 1 after his voice went out. Although reported as a cold, Hoey's garbled and incoherent words led many to think that Hoey was drunk. After this incident, Hoey never went to the broadcast booth without a tin of throat lozenges. His only other national assignment was calling the 1936 Major League Baseball All-Star Game, played in Boston, for Mutual.

After the 1936 season, Hoey was fired by the head of the Yankee Network, John Shepard III. Baseball fans, including Franklin D. Roosevelt, rallied to his defense. After the 1938 season, Hoey demanded a raise, but the sponsors, despite public pressure, replaced Hoey with former player and manager Frankie Frisch. After leaving the booth, Hoey covered the Red Sox and Braves in Boston newspapers until 1946.

Hoey died in his home in Winthrop, Massachusetts, of accidental gas asphyxiation on November 17, 1949.
