= Jade McCarthy =

American sportscaster (born 1980)

- Born: July 20, 1980 (age 46); Newton, Massachusetts, U.S.
- Education: Mount Holyoke College (BA)
- Occupation: Sportscaster
- Spouse: Gordon Stead (2008-present)
- Children: 3

Jade McCarthy (born July 20, 1980) is an American sportscaster who is a former anchor on ESPN's SportsCenter and former host of NESN Daily on NESN.

== Early life ==
McCarthy was born in Newton, Massachusetts. As a child, she rode horses competitively for ten years. She grew up near Boston and attended Mount Holyoke College.

== Career ==
McCarthy started her career at WGGB-TV in Springfield, Massachusetts. She then moved to WAFF, the NBC affiliate in Huntsville, Alabama. She was a sports anchor at WCAU in Philadelphia, where she won numerous Sports Emmy Awards. McCarthy joined NESN in early 2010; she was a part-time host and reporter for SportsDesk. After SportsDesk was canceled, she became the host of the network's new show NESN Daily.

McCarthy left NESN in August 2011 after her husband, Gordon Stead, got a job in Philadelphia. McCarthy returned to TV in September 2012, joining ESPN as an anchor for SportsCenter. On April 26, 2017, it was announced that ESPN was laying off around 100 on-air personalities, with McCarthy being one of the victims.

McCarthy joined NBC Sports Boston in September 2018 as host of the Opening Drive New England Patriots pregame show. In 2022 she began doing a podcast for Sports Spectrum, a podcast network that tells "stories where sports and faith connect".

== Personal life ==
McCarthy is a Christian. McCarthy and Stead had a son in October 2011. They welcomed their second child, another boy, in August 2015. Their third child, a daughter, was born in July 2017.
