= Don Orsillo =

American sportscaster (born 1968)

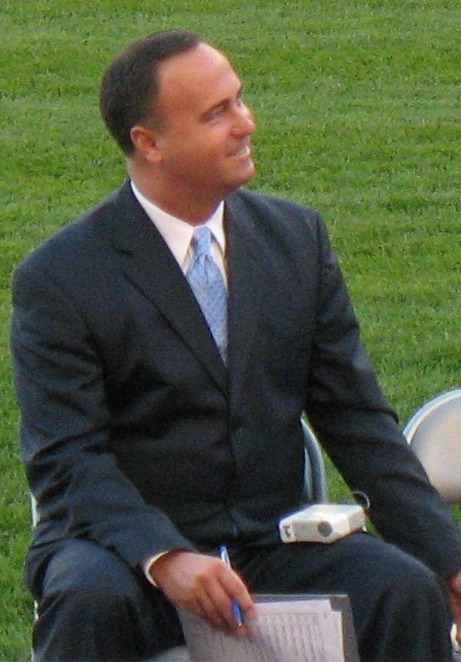
- Orsillo in 2008

San Diego Padres
- Broadcaster
- Born: December 16, 1968 (age 57); Melrose, Massachusetts, U.S.

Teams
- As Broadcaster: Boston Red Sox (2001–2015); TBS (2007–present); San Diego Padres (2016–present); FOX (2017–present)

Don Orsillo (born December 16, 1968) is an American sportscaster who is the play-by-play announcer for the San Diego Padres of Major League Baseball (MLB). He is also an announcer for MLB on TBS and MLB on Fox. Orsillo was the play-by-play announcer for the Boston Red Sox on NESN from 2001 to 2015; he was hired by the Padres to replace Dick Enberg upon his retirement at the end of the 2016 season.

== Early life and career ==
Orsillo was born in Melrose, Massachusetts, where he often dreamed of being a broadcaster for the Red Sox. He moved to and grew up in Madison, New Hampshire, and was educated at John H. Fuller Elementary School. At the age of 12 he attended Kennett Junior High School in nearby Conway, New Hampshire. Don's family moved west just before high school. He is a 1987 graduate of Miraleste High School in Rancho Palos Verdes, California, where he played on the Marauder basketball and baseball teams.

Orsillo graduated from Northeastern University with a degree in Communication Studies. While at Northeastern, he interned under Red Sox radio voice Joe Castiglione.

Before doing Major League Baseball games, he worked in the minor leagues announcing Pawtucket Red Sox games on the radio from 1996 to 2000, having previously called games for some of the New York Mets minor league affiliates.

== Boston Red Sox ==
Orsillo was NESN's play-by-play man from the beginning of the 2001 season (his first game included a no-hitter thrown by then Red Sox pitcher Hideo Nomo against the Baltimore Orioles). He also called Cal Ripken Jr.'s final game, as well as the no-hitters thrown by young Sox pitchers Clay Buchholz and Jon Lester in 2007 and 2008, respectively. Orsillo originally only called the team's games which aired on NESN, with longtime Red Sox announcer Sean McDonough taking Orsillo's place alongside former Red Sox second baseman Jerry Remy for games which aired on local stations WFXT (2001 and 2002) and WSBK-TV (2003 and 2004). For the 2005 season, Orsillo did games on both NESN and WSBK, working with Remy.

Starting in 2006, NESN took over all Red Sox local telecasts, and until 2015, Orsillo worked with color commentator Jerry Remy. In 2009, Remy was out for the season due to health problems, and Orsillo worked with various color commentators, including Dennis Eckersley, Nick Cafardo, Sean Casey, Dave Roberts and Frank Viola. He was sometimes referred to by fans as "announcer boy," after he was given that nickname by Red Sox pitcher Tim Wakefield in a NESN commercial.

On August 25, 2015, NESN controversially announced that Orsillo would no longer call Red Sox games following the 2015 season, and would be replaced in 2016 by Dave O'Brien, who had called games for the Red Sox Radio Network since 2007.

The Red Sox and NESN were further criticized in 2022 when Orsillo was not included in an April 20 tribute ceremony at Fenway Park for longtime broadcast partner Remy, who died the previous October. Red Sox officials claimed his absence was due to his obligations to the Padres, but Orsillo responded on Twitter that he had submitted a video tribute that the Red Sox ultimately opted not to include in the ceremony.

== San Diego Padres ==
Orsillo joined the San Diego Padres for 2016, to be the successor of Dick Enberg upon his retirement after that season. During the 2016 season, Orsillo worked select Padres games for television and radio broadcasts. On February 19, 2025, Orsillo and the Padres agreed to a "long-term" contract extension.

== Other announcing duties ==
In addition to his Red Sox duties, Orsillo has called the Beanpot hockey tournament and Boston College Eagles men's basketball on NESN. He was also the play-by-play announcer for Providence College men's basketball for Cox Sports. Orsillo has also called Big East basketball for the Big East Network which was run by ESPN Regional Television. He was also a Springfield Falcons (AHL) broadcaster and voice of the Falcons from 1994 to 1996.

From 2007 to 2013, Orsillo was one of the voices of the Major League Baseball Division Series on TBS. He was one of four play-by-play men to work each of the years TBS had exclusive rights to the Division Series. His first call was the 2007 National League wild card playoff between the Colorado Rockies and San Diego Padres, with Joe Simpson serving as his color man. After working with Harold Reynolds in the 2008 Division Series, Orsillo had Buck Martinez as his color commentator. His most recent Division Series assignment was the 2013 series between the Detroit Tigers and the Oakland Athletics. As recently as 2017, Orsillo has been calling select Sunday afternoon regular season games for TBS. Also in 2017, he began calling select Saturday afternoon regular season games for Fox and FS1.

In 2018, Orsillo returned to calling playoff action, calling the entirety of the 2018 ALDS between the Astros and the Indians alongside analyst Dennis Eckersley. This was due to Ernie Johnson being unable to work the games following a diagnosis of blood clots in both of Johnson's legs. When Johnson was given his studio hosting duties back, Orsillo became a permanent member of the postseason team in 2020, working alongside analyst Jeff Francoeur until 2022, when he was replaced by Bob Costas.

== Personal life ==
Orsillo lives in Coronado, California, with his wife, Kathy Maguire Orsillo. They previously lived in Smithfield, Rhode Island.
