= Will Flemming =

American sportscaster (born 1979)

- Born: April 3, 1979 (age 47); Alexandria, Virginia, U.S.
- Education: Stanford University
- Sports commentary career
- Teams: Pawtucket Red Sox (2015–2018); Boston Red Sox (2019–present)
- Genre: Play-by-play
- Sport: Baseball
- Employer: Boston Red Sox Radio Network

William Flemming (born April 3, 1979) is an American sportscaster who is a play-by-play broadcaster for the Boston Red Sox with the Boston Red Sox Radio Network.

== Broadcasting career ==
Flemming has experience calling a wide range of sports including college basketball and college ice hockey for ESPN and CBS Sports. Additionally, he has worked for FOX Sports, Turner Broadcasting, the IU Indy Jaguars men's basketball team, as well as the Indianapolis Indians, Potomac Nationals and Lancaster JetHawks baseball teams.

Flemming served as the play-by-play voice of the Pawtucket Red Sox, then the Triple-A affiliate of the Boston Red Sox, from 2015 through 2018. In 2019, he joined the Boston Red Sox Radio Network to call games for the major-league Red Sox.

On August 31, 2026, Flemming, heretofore largely unknown outside of New England, drew widespread criticism after referring to New York Yankees second baseman Jazz Chisholm Jr. as a “bush league player”, saying that he “plays the game the wrong way,” and suggesting that Boston retaliate against Yankees players during a Red Sox broadcast. Chisholm had stolen second base and then third base in a game the Yankees already led, 7–1. Flemming later apologized, saying that his comments had “crossed a line” and that his emotions as a fan had affected the broadcast. Flemming was absent from the Red Sox radio booth for the following series, prompting speculation that he had been suspended, although the break was pre-planned.

== Personal life ==
Flemming has a B.A. from Stanford University in Spanish literature. His brother Dave Flemming is a broadcaster for the San Francisco Giants and formerly ESPN.
