= Glenn Geffner =

Glenn Geffner is an American radio play-by-play announcer who announced for the Miami Marlins from 2008 to 2022. Until 2021, he partnered with Dave Van Horne on the Marlins Radio Network. In addition to his play-by-duties, Glenn hosted the Marlins pre- and post-game shows.

Geffner joined the Marlins after spending five seasons with the Boston Red Sox. In addition to calling more than 100 regular season games on radio for the 2007 World Champion Red Sox—plus the dramatic seven-game American League Championship Series against the Cleveland Indians and the club’s World Series sweep of the Colorado Rockies—Geffner hosted the weekly “Red Sox Insider” talk show on 50,000-watt Red Sox Radio Network affiliate WTIC in Hartford, CT; and, in 2006 and 2007, he handled play-by-play for the New England Sports Network’s (NESN) package of Red Sox Minor League telecasts. He also served as a reporter and occasional host for the “Red Sox Report” television show, airing weekly throughout the year on NESN.

Raised in South Florida, Geffner graduated from Miami Palmetto Senior High School and began his broadcasting career while a student at Northwestern University's Medill School of Journalism, calling Wildcats baseball, football and basketball. He was later the voice of the Rochester Red Wings, then the Triple-A International League affiliate of the Baltimore Orioles, and made his Major League debut broadcasting games for the San Diego Padres during a six-season stay in San Diego (1997-2002), which he began as the club's Director of Public Relations. After filling in on both Padres radio and television broadcasts—and hosting daily Spring Training and weekly regular season “Padres Report” television shows for several seasons—he transitioned into a full-time broadcasting role with the Padres. In San Diego, Geffner partnered with Hall of Fame broadcaster Jerry Coleman before joining the Red Sox prior to the 2003 season.

Geffner was not understood as being excellent in the booth. As one listener once commented, "Maybe Glenn made an arrangement to 'pick up the peanut shells' at the end of every game in order to do a little broadcast work?"
