= Adrian Garcia Marquez =

American sportscaster (born 1973)

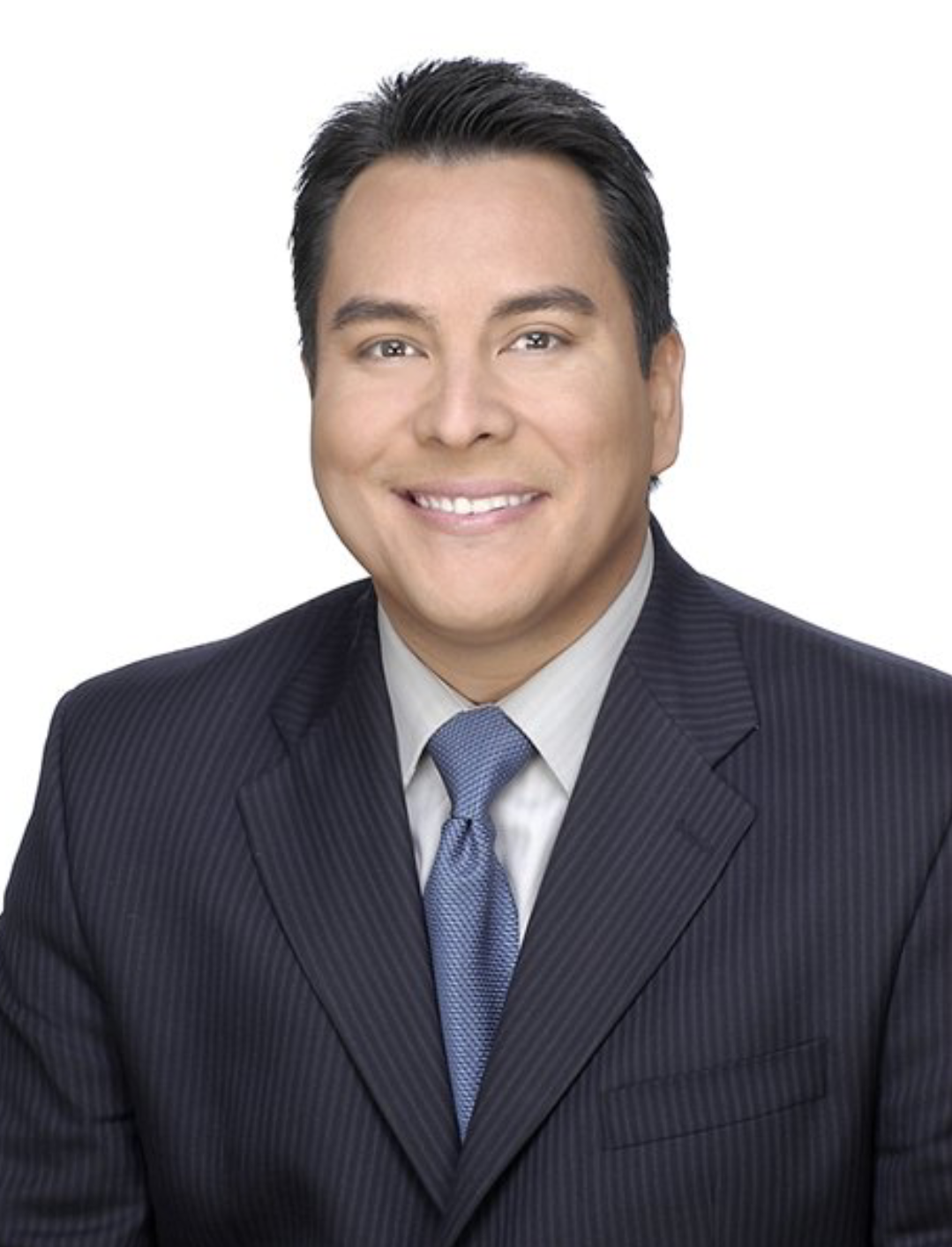
Sportscaster Adrian Garcia Marquez

Adrian Garcia Marquez (born December 28, 1973) is an American sportscaster who works for Fox Deportes as a play-by-play announcer, narrator, and host. He also serves as one of the international voices of the NBA calling action on the NBA League Pass. Prior to joining Fox and the NBA, he was with the Los Angeles Lakers for 6 seasons serving as the team's Spanish TV play-by-play announcer on Time Warner Cable Deportes later becoming Spectrum Deportes.

In his time calling Lakers basketball, he became an Emmy Award-winning announcer while also securing two NBA 'Best Live Call' Awards and 3 straight 'Best TV Play by Play in Spanish' Awards from the Southern California Sports Broadcasters Association. He also received two "Call of the Year" nominations from SCSB for 2017 and 2018. In 2017 he was runner-up to the legendary Vin Scully, who upon receiving the award said "I think you gave it to the wrong guy, he (Adrian) should have won!". Before joining the Lakers, Garcia Marquez was the voice for MLB on Fox Deportes where he called 5 World Series and All-Star Games as well as the Saturday game of the week. In 2012, he was the Spanish TV voice of the LA Galaxy.

== Career ==
Garcia Marquez graduated from Southwest Senior High School and San Diego City College.

A native of South Chula Vista and Tijuana, he worked as a sports anchor and reporter for the Univision Network as well as the local affiliate in Los Angeles, KMEX. Prior to being with the Spanish television giant, Adrian was an announcer with Top Rank Boxing, Fox Deportes, and the San Diego Chargers Radio Network. He also called games for the Los Angeles Dodgers on Time Warner Cable, the Los Angeles Angels of Anaheim on KWKW 1330 ESPN Deportes Radio, and USC Football on Univision Radio.

He joined Top Rank Boxing in 2009 as the blow-by-blow announcer alongside analyst and ex-champ Raúl Márquez on Azteca América. In 2010, the tandem became the lead talent for Top Rank's highly rated boxing show, 'Top Rank Live', on Fox Deportes and Azteca America. Hall of Fame boxing promoter, Bob Arum called Adrian, "One of the best young sportscasters in America."

At Fox Deportes, from 2005 to 2010, Garcia Marquez was the play-by-play announcer for Major League Baseball calling all regular season games of the week, the MLB All-Star Game, American League Championship Series, National League Championship Series and World Series. The former collegiate baseball player also served as studio host for 'Beisbol en Fox' and was the lead announcer on a team that includes former Major Leaguers Jose Tolentino, Carlos Hernández, Chicago White Sox manager Ozzie Guillén, and Manny Mota, as well as current manager of the Cleveland Indians, Manny Acta. Garcia Marquez, also called soccer action for Copa Libertadores and Copa Sudamericana, and hosted the NFL show, "Impacto NFL" for the international network.

The San Diego native became the analyst for the San Diego Chargers Radio Network in Spanish on Pulsar 107.3 FM in 2008, where he also hosted and produced the pre and post-game shows. That same year Adrian was a reporter for 710 ESPN Radio in Los Angeles.

The 2007 MLB season marked the debut of Adrian Garcia as a reporter for the Los Angeles Dodgers on Fox Sports West.

Adrian contributed to "Dodgers Live" alongside hosts Patrick O'Neal, Kevin Kennedy, and Steve Lyons. On Dodgers game telecasts live, Garcia provided post-game player interviews while also reporting on Dodger on-and-off the field developments. Garcia is bilingual. Garcia also joined 710 ESPN Radio in 2007 where he served as reporter and guest host.

From 2002 to 2007, Garcia Marquez worked for Telemundo. He served as the morning news anchor for "Buenos Dias". His experience with Telemundo included being named to the first ever Olympic broadcasting team in Spanish for the United States, announcing baseball and basketball for the 2004 Olympics in Athens. Garcia Marquez was also the weekend sports anchor for "Noticias 52". On KVEA's sister station, KJLA, he hosted several shows such as "El Show de Los Lakers", "Dodgers en Domingo", "Mundo Deportivo", and The Rose Parade. The Mexican-American broadcaster also served as play by play announcer for Los Angeles Angels of Anaheim games on KJLA alongside veteran broadcaster José Mota.

Garcia Marquez was also a writer for the New York–based Beisbol Mundial magazine.

He was the play-by-play announcer for the San Diego Chargers pre-season television games on Mi San Diego, the Spanish-language affiliate of NBC in San Diego.

Garcia Marquez has an extensive background in radio. He began as the San Diego Padres pregame show host for K 1040AM in San Diego in 1999.

Seeing that the Padres had no interest in Garcia Marquez, the former college catcher looked elsewhere and got his break as a play-by-play announcer with the Oakland Athletics in 2000.

That same season, he was recruited by ESPN Deportes and spent almost two years at the international sports network.

At ESPN, he was an announcer, reporter, and analyst for Wednesday and Sunday Night Baseball, Sunday and Monday Night Football and NFL Primetime, all in Spanish. The exposure on ESPN led to the Boston Red Sox appointing him the team's Spanish radio voice in 2001. That year, he had the rare opportunity of calling two no hitters. One by Hideo Nomo on April 4, 2001, vs. the Baltimore Orioles and St. Louis Cardinals pitcher Bud Smith's no-no against the San Diego Padres on September 3, 2001.

From Bristol, Connecticut, he was recruited by the Univision network in Miami, Florida, to become a sports anchor for Contacto Deportivo on Telefutura where he added his unique style of sportscasting to the half-hour sports highlight show and the coverage of the 2002 World Cup in Japan/Korea.

On Radiovisa 830AM, he was the play-by-play announcer for both USC Trojans en Espanol and the Los Angeles Clippers. He also hosted and produced "Calentando con Adrian Garcia Marquez" sports talk show.

In August 2018, Garcia Marquez became the lead English-language play-by-play commentator of Liga MX, the men's Mexican first division fútbol (soccer) league, on the networks of Fox Sports (US). He has been paired with former Mexican international Mariano Trujillo, former U.S. international Cobi Jones and former England international Warren Barton as his match analyst (co-commentator) partner.

== Signature Calls ==
- "Sientate!!" (English: sit) Baseball
- "Vuela la Pelota, Vuela la Pelotaaaaaaaaaaa...Bye Bye Pelota (English: The ball's flying, it's flying, bye bye ball) Baseball
- ""Lo retrato sin sonrisa"" (Took his picture with no smile, struck him out looking) Baseball
- "Del arco al charco" (English: From the Arc to the Puddle) Basketball
- ""Comienza el sonoro purple y oro"" (English: The purple and gold rumble begins) Basketball
- "Desde Tripotitlan" (English: from Tripotitlan, Three point land) Basketball
- ""Tripotitlan Beach"" (Three pointers from Jack Nicholson seats and visiting bench area) Basketball
- "Desde el Rancho de Tres Caballos" (English: From the Three Horse Ranch, three pointer) Basketball
- ""Desde la tienda de la esquina (English: From the corner store, three pointer) Basketball
- "Volcanazo!!" (English: Volcanic Dunk)
- ""Jumpercito"" (English: Short or midrange jumper) Basketball
- ""Saco el Matamoscas"" (English: Broke out the fly swatter, blocked shot) Basketball
- ""Ganaron Los Lakers, tus Lakers, mis Lakers, nuestros Lakers!!"" (English: Your Lakers, my Lakers, our Lakers, The Lakers, win!!) Basketball
- "Amigos bienvenidos al deporte de los batazos violentos y aficionados atentos...el de las Rrrrrrectas quemantes y magos con guantes...esto es beisbol de grandes ligas..." (English: Friends welcome to the sport of violent swings and mindful fans ...the one of blazing fastballs and magicians with a glove ... this is major league baseball").

ESPN's Chris Berman once featured him on his "2 Minute Drill" on SportsCenter because he enjoyed some of Garcia's creative calls on NFL Primetime in Spanish, such as his singing of "Ave Maria" during Hail Mary passes.

Nicknamed "El Poeta" by former Houston Astros player and Mexico national team First Base Coach turned analyst, Jose Tolentino, for his poetic intros to games and calls of the action.
