= List of New England Patriots broadcasters =

== Radio ==
The New England Patriots' flagship radio station is WBZ-FM 98.5 FM, owned by CBS Radio. The larger radio network is called the "New England Patriots Radio Network", whose 35 affiliate stations span seven states. Gil Santos and Gino Cappelletti were the longtime announcing team. In 2011, the network debuted a sideline reporter, with former quarterback Scott Zolak handling sideline duty. On July 20, 2012, Gino Cappelletti announced his retirement, ending a 32-year career as the popular color analyst on the team’s radio broadcasts, and was replaced by Zolak. Santos had also announced that 2012 would be his final season. Former Navy football broadcaster Bob Socci was named to replace Santos beginning in 2013.

=== By year ===
| Years | Flagship station | Play-by-Play | Color Commentator | Sideline reporter |
|---|---|---|---|---|
| 1960–64 | 590 WEEI | Bob Gallagher | Fred Cusick | |
| 1965 | 590 WEEI | Ned Martin | Fred Cusick | |
| 1966–70 | 1030 WBZ | Bob Starr | Gil Santos | |
| 1971 | 1030 WBZ | Gil Santos | John Carlson | |
| 1972–78 | 1030 WBZ | Gil Santos | Gino Cappelletti | |
| 1979 | 1030 WBZ | Gil Santos | Jon Morris | |
| 1980–86 | 590 WEEI | John Carlson | Jon Morris | |
| 1987 | 850 WHDH | Curt Gowdy | Jon Morris | |
| 1988–90 | 850 WHDH | Dale Arnold | Gino Cappelletti | |
| 1991–1995 | 1030 WBZ | Gil Santos | Gino Cappelletti | |
| 1995–2000 | 104.1 WBCN | Gil Santos | Gino Cappelletti | |
| 2001 (first eight games)* | 104.1 WBCN | Gil Santos | Pete Brock | |
| 2001–2008 | 104.1 WBCN | Gil Santos | Gino Cappelletti | |
| 2009–2010 | 98.5 WBZ | Gil Santos | Gino Cappelletti | |
| 2011 | 98.5 WBZ | Gil Santos | Gino Cappelletti | Scott Zolak |
| 2012 * | 98.5 WBZ | Gil Santos | Scott Zolak | |
| 2013–present | 98.5 WBZ | Bob Socci | Scott Zolak | |
| 2018–present (preseason only) | 98.5 WBZ | Dan Roche | Matt Chatham | |

- Brock replaced Cappelletti for the first eight games of 2001 because of illness to Cappelletti.
- Cappelletti returned to the broadcast booth for the opening quarter of New England's Week 17 game vs. Miami.

== Television ==
Any preseason games not on national television are shown on CBS affiliate WBZ-TV, along with other stations in the other New England television markets. These games were broadcast on ABC affiliate WCVB-TV from 1995 until the change to WBZ in 2009.

=== By year ===
| Year | Flagship Station | Play-by-Play | Color Commentator | Sideline Reporter(s) |
|---|---|---|---|---|
| 1971 | WSMW-TV | Bob Fouracre | Larry Garron | |
| 1972 | WBZ-TV | Dick Stockton and Ken Coleman | | |
| 1973 | WCVB-TV | Don Gillis | Rommie Loudd | |
| 1974 | WCVB-TV | Don Gillis | | |
| 1975 | WBZ-TV | Len Berman | Willie Davis | |
| 1976 | WBZ-TV | Len Berman | Willie Davis | |
| 1977 | WBZ-TV | Len Berman | Jim Nance | |
| 1978 | WBZ-TV | Roger Twibell | Jimmy Myers | |
| 1979 | WBZ-TV | Roger Twibell | Randy Vataha | |
| 1980 | WBZ-TV | Roger Twibell and Gil Santos | | |
| 1981 | WBZ-TV | Gil Santos | Bob Lobel | |
| 1982 | WBZ-TV | Gil Santos | Bob Lobel | |
| 1983 | WNEV-TV | Jim Kelly | Tim Mazzetti and Will McDonough | |
| 1984 | WBZ-TV | Bob Lobel | Gino Cappelletti | |
| 1985 | WBZ-TV | Bob Lobel | Gino Cappelletti | |
| 1986 | WBZ-TV | Bob Lobel | Dave Rowe | |
| 1987 | WBZ-TV | Bob Lobel | Sam Rutigliano | |
| 1988 | WBZ-TV | Bob Lobel | Sam Rutigliano | |
| 1989 | WBZ-TV | Bob Lobel | Jon Morris | |
| 1990 | WBZ-TV | Bob Lobel | Jon Morris | |
| 1991 | WBZ-TV | Bob Neumeier and Bob Lobel | Steve Grogan and Tim Fox | |
| 1992 | WLVI | Mike Crispino | Steve Grogan and Tim Fox | |
| 1993 | WLVI | Michael Barkann | Steve Grogan and Tim Fox | |
| 1994 | WBZ-TV | Bob Neumeier and Bob Lobel | | |
| 1995 | WCVB-TV | Don Criqui | Jerry Glanville | |
| 1996 | WCVB-TV | Don Criqui | Jerry Glanville | |
| 1997 | WCVB-TV | Don Criqui | Jerry Glanville | |
| 1998 | WCVB-TV | Don Criqui | Jerry Glanville | Mike Lynch |
| 1999 | WCVB-TV | Don Criqui | Jerry Glanville | Mike Lynch |
| 2000 | WCVB-TV | Don Criqui | Jerry Glanville | Mike Lynch |
| 2001 | WCVB-TV | Don Criqui | Jerry Glanville | Mike Lynch |
| 2002 | WCVB-TV | Don Criqui | Jerry Glanville | Mike Lynch |
| 2003 | WCVB-TV | Don Criqui | Randy Cross | Mike Lynch |
| 2004 | WCVB-TV | Don Criqui | Randy Cross | Mike Lynch |
| 2005 | WCVB-TV | Don Criqui | Randy Cross | Mike Lynch |
| 2006 | WCVB-TV | Don Criqui | Randy Cross | Mike Lynch |
| 2007 | WCVB-TV | Don Criqui | Randy Cross | Mike Lynch |
| 2008 | WCVB-TV | Don Criqui | Randy Cross | Mike Lynch |
| 2009 | WBZ-TV | Don Criqui | Randy Cross | Steve Burton |
| 2010 | WBZ-TV | Don Criqui | Randy Cross | Steve Burton and Scott Zolak |
| 2011 | WBZ-TV | Don Criqui | Randy Cross | Steve Burton and Scott Zolak |
| 2012 | WBZ-TV | Don Criqui | Randy Cross | Steve Burton |
| 2013 | WBZ-TV | Dan Roche | Christian Fauria | Steve Burton and Matt Chatham |
| 2014 | WBZ-TV | Dan Roche | Christian Fauria | Steve Burton and Matt Chatham |
| 2015 | WBZ-TV | Dan Roche | Christian Fauria | Steve Burton and Matt Chatham |
| 2016 | WBZ-TV | Dan Roche | Christian Fauria | Steve Burton and Matt Chatham |
| 2017 | WBZ-TV | Dan Roche | Christian Fauria | Steve Burton and Matt Chatham |
| 2018 | WBZ-TV | Bob Socci | Scott Zolak | Steve Burton and Rob Ninkovich |
| 2019 | WBZ-TV | Bob Socci | Scott Zolak | Steve Burton and Rob Ninkovich |
| 2020 | WBZ-TV | Bob Socci | Scott Zolak | Steve Burton and Rob Ninkovich |
| 2021 | WBZ-TV | Bob Socci | Scott Zolak | Steve Burton and Rob Ninkovich |
| 2022 | WBZ-TV | Bob Socci | Scott Zolak | Steve Burton and Rob Ninkovich |
| 2023 | WBZ-TV | Bob Socci | Scott Zolak | Steve Burton and Rob Ninkovich |
| 2024 | WBZ-TV | Scott Zolak | Devin McCourty and Jason McCourty | Steve Burton and Brian Hoyer |
| 2025 | WBZ-TV | Scott Zolak | Devin McCourty and Jason McCourty | Steve Burton and Brian Hoyer |
