= Gil Santos =

Portuguese-American sports announcer (1938–2018)

- Born: April 19, 1938; Acushnet, Massachusetts, U.S.
- Died: April 19, 2018 (aged 80); Raynham, Massachusetts, U.S.
- Burial place: Raynham, Massachusetts, U.S.
- Occupations: Sports announcer, sports reporter
- Years active: 1959–2013
- Known for: Radio play-by-play for the New England Patriots
- Spouse: Roberta
- Children: 2

Gilbert A. Santos (April 19, 1938 – April 19, 2018) was an American radio play-by-play announcer based in the Boston area. He called games for the New England Patriots of the National Football League and the Boston Celtics of the National Basketball Association, served as the morning sports reporter for WBZ radio in Boston. He was an inductee of the Massachusetts Broadcasters Hall of Fame.

He retired from WBZ radio in January 2009, and was inducted into the WBZ Radio Hall of Fame on July 9, 2009. The Patriots 2012 season was his final season of radio play-by-play.

== Early years ==
Santos was born in Acushnet, Massachusetts, and grew up in a Portuguese-speaking family from the Azores in Fairhaven, Massachusetts. He graduated from Fairhaven High School in 1956. He attended the University of Massachusetts Dartmouth and later graduated from the New England Broadcast School. From 1959 through 1971, Santos worked on radio at WBSM and WNBH in New Bedford, Massachusetts, and WSAR and WALE in Fall River, Massachusetts.

== Career ==
Santos first began his work on Patriots games as the color commentator working with play-by-play announcer Bob Starr from 1966 through 1970 on WBZ 1030. After Starr's departure from the Boston market following the 1970 NFL season, Santos took over as play-by-play announcer and handled that assignment for nine years. From 1980 through 1990, the Patriots' broadcast rights shifted—first to WEEI 590, then to WHDH 850—and Santos spent 11 seasons out of the team's radio booth, with John Carlson, Curt Gowdy and Dale Arnold serving as play-by-play announcers for those flagship stations. Santos returned as the Patriots' radio voice in 1991 when WBZ radio regained the team's broadcast rights.

From 1972 through 1978 and from 1990 through 2011, his partner in the booth was former Patriots kicker Gino Cappelletti, except for the opening eight games of the 2001 Patriots season when Cappelletti was hospitalized with an illness and former Patriots player Peter Brock substituted for Cappelletti. Cappelletti retired from his position prior to the 2012 season and was replaced by former Patriots quarterback Scott Zolak.

In addition to his work at WBZ, Santos commentated games for the Boston Celtics, Boston Breakers, Providence Friars basketball, Penn State Nittany Lions football, and Boston College Eagles football. On January 10, 2009, Santos announced his retirement from WBZ radio, effective at the end of that month. He continued as Patriots play-by-play announcer when the team's network switched from WBCN to the new WBZ-FM, branded as "The Sports Hub".

In April 2012, Santos suffered a bout with pneumonia and was briefly hospitalized, calling into question his future as Patriots play-by-play announcer. He nonetheless announced he would return for one final season as Patriots broadcaster, retiring after the 2012 NFL season. In April 2013, Bob Socci was announced as Santos' replacement.

Santos' 36 years of service made him the longest-serving announcer in the NFL, tied with Merrill Reese of the Philadelphia Eagles; he was also the final announcer who remained from the American Football League era.

=== Milestones ===
On September 26, 2010, the Patriots defeated the Buffalo Bills 38–30; it marked the 700th Patriots game, encompassing preseason, regular season, playoffs, and the Super Bowl, that Santos broadcast. His 750th broadcast took place on November 11, 2012, a dramatic 37–31 Patriots win, also against the Bills. He commentated 15 of the club's 19 playoff runs and six Super Bowls.

On December 30, 2012, Santos was rejoined by Gino Cappelletti for the first quarter of New England's 28–0 shutout of the Dolphins, his final regular season broadcast. CBS Sports also simulcast part of Santos' play-by-play during the game's first quarter. Prior to the game, during a ceremony honoring the contributions of Santos and Cappelletti, Patriots Chairman and CEO Robert Kraft announced that Santos would be inducted into the Patriots Hall of Fame in 2013.

The last game Santos commentated was in January 2013, the Patriots' AFC Championship Game loss to the Ravens, his 759th broadcast. Santos was inducted to the Patriots Hall of Fame on July 22, 2013, alongside fellow honoree Tedy Bruschi.

== Personal life ==
Santos served in the Massachusetts Army National Guard with the 1st Howitzer Battalion, 211 Field Artillery, and attained the rank of staff sergeant. He and his wife, Roberta, were married in 1961 and had two children. They lived in Raynham, Massachusetts.

Santos died on April 19, 2018, his 80th birthday and 57th wedding anniversary. A public visitation was held on April 24 in Bridgewater, Massachusetts. His funeral was held on April 25 in Raynham, where he was buried with military honors.

== See also ==
- List of New England Patriots broadcasters

Preceded by Bob Starr	New England Patriots Play by Play announcer 1971–1979	Succeeded by John Carlson
Preceded by Dale Arnold	New England Patriots Play by Play announcer 1991–2012	Succeeded by Bob Socci
Preceded by Roger Twibell	Boston Celtics Television Play by Play announcer 1981–1989	Succeeded by Mike Crispino
Preceded by Bob Lobel	Boston College Eagles football Play by Play; 1987–1991	Succeeded by Dale Arnold
