= General Carlson =

General Carlson may refer to:

- Bruce A. Carlson (born 1949), U.S. Air Force four-star general
- Evans Carlson (1896–1947), U.S. Marine Corps brigadier general
- John Carlson (sportscaster) (1933–2016), Massachusetts Army National Guard brigadier general
