= Super Bowl XLIX =

2015 National Football League championship game

New England Patriots (1) (AFC) (12–4)	Seattle Seahawks (1) (NFC) (12–4)
28	24
Head coach: Bill Belichick	Head coach: Pete Carroll
	1	2	3	4	Total
NE	0	14	0	14	28
SEA	0	14	10	0	24
- Date: February 1, 2015
- Kickoff time: 4:30 p.m. MST (UTC-7)
- Stadium: University of Phoenix Stadium; Glendale, Arizona (Note: The game was originally scheduled to be played at Arrowhead Stadium in Kansas City, Missouri.)
- MVP: Tom Brady, quarterback
- Favorite: None (even/toss-up)
- Referee: Bill Vinovich
- Attendance: 70,288

Ceremonies
- National anthem: Idina Menzel
- Coin toss: Tedy Bruschi, Kenny Easley
- Halftime show: Katy Perry featuring Lenny Kravitz, Missy Elliott and the Arizona State University Sun Devil Marching Band

TV in the United States
- Network: NBC
- Announcers: Al Michaels (play-by-play); Cris Collinsworth (analyst); Michele Tafoya (sideline reporter)
- Nielsen ratings: 47.5 (national); 61.0 (Boston); 55.6 (Phoenix); 52.1 (Seattle); U.S. viewership: 114.4 million est. avg.
- Market share: 72 (national)
- Cost of 30-second commercial: $4.5 million

Radio in the United States
- Network: Westwood One
- Announcers: Kevin Harlan (play-by-play); Boomer Esiason (analyst); James Lofton and Mark Malone (sideline reporters)

Super Bowl XLIX was an American football game played to determine the champion of the National Football League (NFL) for the 2014 season. The American Football Conference (AFC) champion New England Patriots defeated the National Football Conference (NFC) champion Seattle Seahawks, 28–24. The game was played on February 1, 2015, at University of Phoenix Stadium in Glendale, Arizona, the second Super Bowl held at the stadium and the third in the Phoenix metropolitan area.

The Patriots' victory was their fourth overall and first since 2004's Super Bowl XXXIX, ending a 10-year championship drought. They finished the regular season with a 12–4 record en route to their eighth Super Bowl appearance, tying the record held by the Dallas Cowboys and Pittsburgh Steelers, and sixth under the leadership of head coach Bill Belichick and quarterback Tom Brady. The Seahawks, led by their Legion of Boom defense, also obtained a 12–4 record and were making their third Super Bowl appearance, in addition to their second consecutive after winning Super Bowl XLVIII. As the defending champions, the Seahawks were seeking to become the first to repeat since the Patriots in 2004, although they were the first since then to appear in two consecutive Super Bowls. For the second consecutive season, both teams were the top seed from their respective conference.

Super Bowl XLIX was kept within a one-possession margin until Seattle took a 10-point lead in the third quarter. New England responded by scoring 14 consecutive points during the fourth to take a 28–24 lead with just over two minutes remaining. The game is most remembered for the Seahawks' last play, in which they threatened to score a winning touchdown from New England's 1-yard line, but were intercepted in the final seconds by Patriots cornerback Malcolm Butler. Butler's interception is regarded as one of the greatest plays in NFL history, while Seattle's decision to pass instead of run the ball is considered one of the worst calls of all time. Brady, who set the Super Bowl record for completions at 37, was named Super Bowl MVP for the third time, tying the record held by Joe Montana. Two years later, Brady would surpass both records in Super Bowl LI.

NBC's broadcast of Super Bowl XLIX set the record for most-watched program in American television history and remains the fourth-most watched American television broadcast of all time. The game was seen by an average of 114.4 million viewers, with it reaching 118.5 million during the Super Bowl XLIX halftime show featuring Katy Perry and peaking to 120.8 million during New England's fourth quarter comeback. It is considered one of the greatest Super Bowls and was ranked eighth on NFL.com's 100 Greatest Games, the third-highest Super Bowl game. Butler's game-winning interception was ranked fifth on NFL.com's 100 Greatest Plays, the highest defensive play. The two franchises would meet again 11 years later in Super Bowl LX.

== Background ==
=== Host selection process ===
==== Initial plan for Kansas City as host city ====
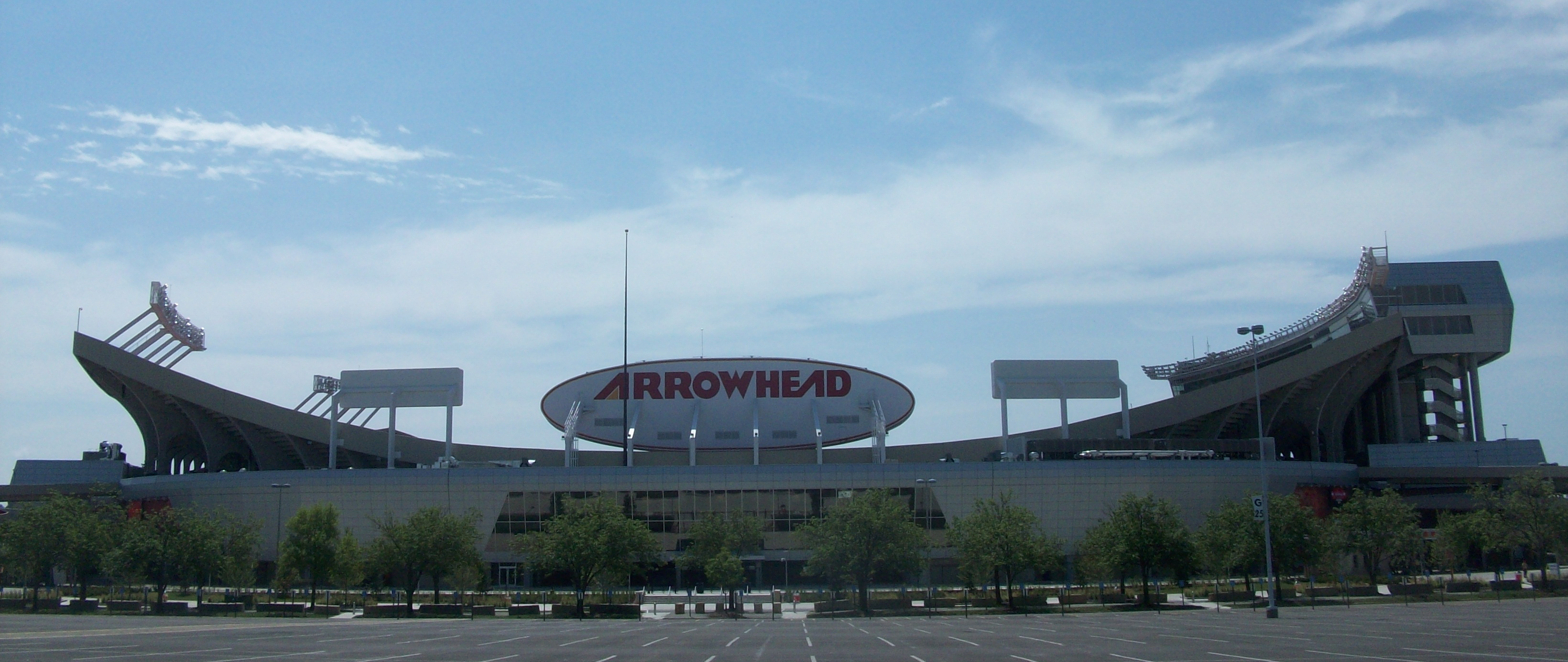
Arrowhead Stadium was originally selected for Super Bowl XLIX, but plans to add a retractable roof ultimately fell through.

NFL owners initially voted in November 2005 to award a Super Bowl to Kansas City, Missouri, in honor of Chiefs owner Lamar Hunt, the founder of the American Football League (AFL) in the 1960s who helped engineer the annual game. Then-NFL Commissioner Paul Tagliabue further announced on March 5, 2006, that Kansas City would host Super Bowl XLIX. However, the game was contingent on the successful passage of two sales taxes in Jackson County, Missouri, on April 4, 2006.

The first tax to fund improvements to Arrowhead and neighboring Kauffman stadiums passed with 53 percent approval. However, the second tax that would have allowed the construction of a rolling roof between the two stadiums was narrowly defeated, with 48 percent approval. In the wake of the defeat, and opposition by the Kansas City Chamber of Commerce and several civic and business groups, Hunt and the Chiefs announced on May 25, 2006, that they were withdrawing the request to host Super Bowl XLIX.

==== Bidding process ====
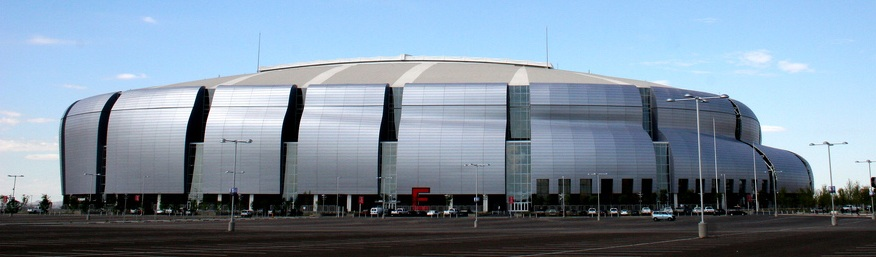
University of Phoenix Stadium in Glendale, Arizona, was chosen for Super Bowl XLIX.

After the Kansas City plan fell through, the following submitted bids to host Super Bowl XLIX:

- Raymond James Stadium – Tampa, Florida
- Sun Life Stadium – Miami Gardens, Florida
- University of Phoenix Stadium – Glendale, Arizona

Tampa and Miami both submitted bids after losing the Super Bowl XLVIII bid to MetLife Stadium in East Rutherford, New Jersey. Arizona had declined to bid for Super Bowl XLVIII, citing the economy, to focus on bidding for Super Bowl XLIX.

NFL spokesman Greg Aiello confirmed in April 2011 that Tampa and Arizona were selected as finalists. The league then announced on October 11, 2011, that University of Phoenix Stadium will host Super Bowl XLIX. This is the second Super Bowl contested at University of Phoenix Stadium, which hosted Super Bowl XLII in February 2008, and the third Super Bowl played in the Phoenix area, as Super Bowl XXX was held at Sun Devil Stadium in nearby Tempe in January 1996.

=== Teams ===
==== New England Patriots ====
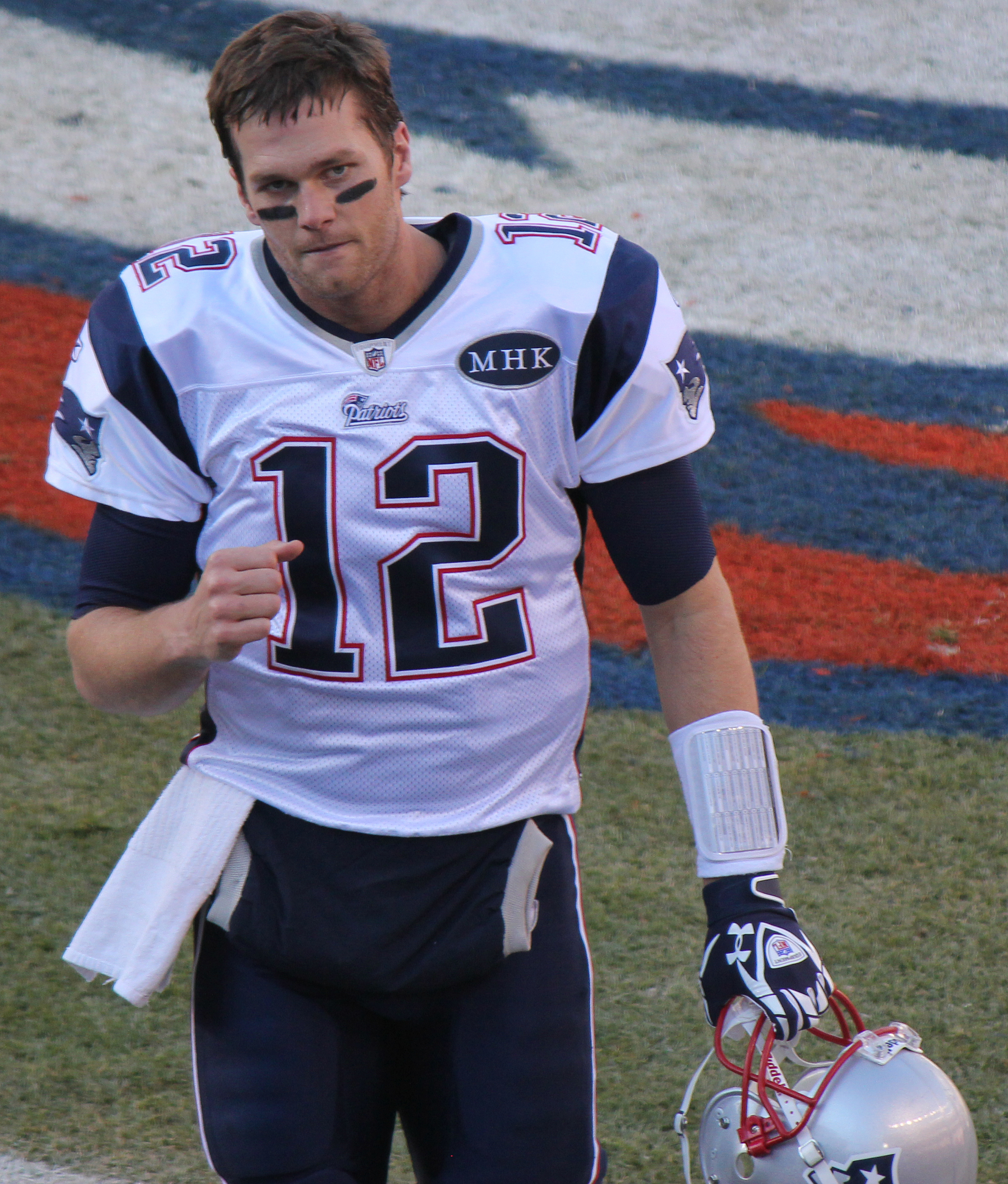
Patriots quarterback Tom Brady.

The New England Patriots had a rough start to their 2014 season, starting the season with a 2–2 record and hitting a low point with a humiliating 41–14 loss to the Kansas City Chiefs in week four. By this point, the Patriots faced heavy criticism in the media, especially quarterback Tom Brady. Former Patriots safety and teammate Rodney Harrison declared Brady "looked scared to death" in the pocket and "doesn't have any confidence in his offensive line." However, New England recovered with an NFL season long seven game winning streak, beginning with a dominating 43–17 win over the Cincinnati Bengals in week five, and went on to lose only two more games for the rest of the year (the latter of which was done while resting the starters the final week of the season), finishing the season with a 12–4 record and the number one seed in the AFC. They finished fourth in the NFL in scoring (468 points) and eighth in points allowed (313), and had the largest point differential in the NFL (with an average margin of victory of 9.7 points). The Patriots defeated the Baltimore Ravens 35–31 in the AFC Divisional playoffs, and then defeated the Indianapolis Colts 45–7 in the AFC Championship Game.

Brady had another fine season in his 14th year as the team's starter, earning his 10th Pro Bowl selection with 4,109 passing yards and 33 touchdowns, with just eight interceptions. His top target was Pro Bowl tight end Rob Gronkowski, who caught 82 passes for 1,124 yards and 12 touchdowns, along with wide receiver Brandon LaFell, who caught 74 passes for 954 yards and seven touchdowns. Wide receiver Julian Edelman was another key aspect of the passing game, with 92 receptions for 974 yards and four touchdowns, while also rushing for 92 yards and returning 25 punts for 299 yards and a touchdown. Running back Jonas Gray was the team's leading rusher with 412 yards and a 4.6 yards per carry average, while Stevan Ridley added 340 yards and Shane Vereen had 391. Vereen was also a reliable pass catcher, hauling in 52 receptions for 447 yards. On special teams, kicker Stephen Gostkowski was selected to his third Pro Bowl and became the third player ever to lead the NFL in scoring four times (and the first since the NFL-AFL merger), converting 35 of 37 field goals (94.6 percent) and racking up 156 points. Matthew Slater also made the Pro Bowl on special teams for the fourth time.

The Patriots defensive line was led by five-time Pro Bowl defensive tackle Vince Wilfork and defensive end Rob Ninkovich, who compiled eight sacks. Behind them, linebacker Jamie Collins led the team in tackles (116) and forced fumbles (four), while also intercepting two passes. Linebacker Dont'a Hightower was also a big contributor with 89 tackles and six sacks. The secondary was led by Pro Bowl cornerback Darrelle Revis, along with safety Devin McCourty, who recorded two interceptions and Brandon Browner, who added a physical presence to the secondary.

==== Seattle Seahawks ====
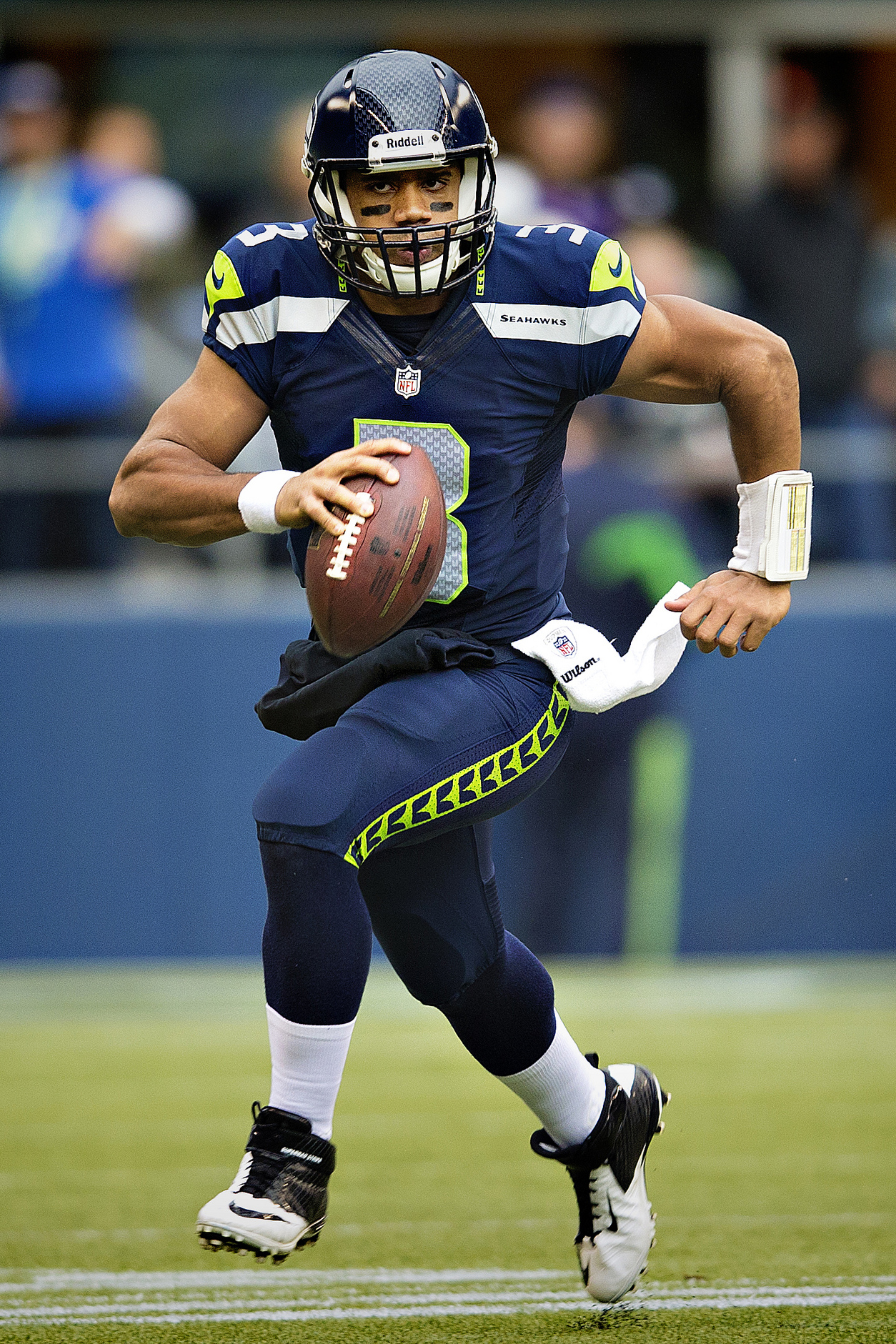
Seahawks quarterback Russell Wilson.

After winning Super Bowl XLVIII the previous season, the Seahawks also struggled to begin the season, floundering near the season's midpoint with a 3–3 record. However, they went on from there to win nine of their final 10 regular season games, preventing their opponents from scoring any touchdowns in five of them. By the time they finished with a 12–4 record and entered the playoffs, they had earned the number one seed, and not allowed any touchdowns in the previous 10 quarters. Their defense ranked first in the NFL in fewest points allowed (254) and their offense was tied at first in rushing yards (2,762). The Seahawks defeated the Carolina Panthers 31–17 in the NFC Divisional playoffs, and later defeated the Green Bay Packers 28–22 in overtime in the NFC Championship Game. Seattle became the first NFC team to advance to consecutive Super Bowls since the 1996–97 Packers in Super Bowls XXXI and XXXII.

Quarterback Russell Wilson was back in control of the Seattle offense, completing 63.1 percent of his passes for 3,475 yards and 20 touchdowns, with seven interceptions, while also rushing for 849 yards and six touchdowns. The team's leading receiver was Doug Baldwin, who caught 66 passes for 825 yards and three touchdowns. Receiver Jermaine Kearse was another reliable target with 38 catches for 537 yards, while tight end Luke Willson caught 22 passes for 362 yards. Running back Marshawn Lynch was selected to his fourth Pro Bowl, ranking fourth in the NFL with 1,306 rushing yards and first in rushing touchdowns with 13. He also caught 37 passes for 364 yards and four more touchdowns. Running back Robert Turbin chipped in 310 yards and 16 receptions. On special teams, kicker Steven Hauschka ranked fourth in the NFL with 134 points and made 31 of 37 field goals (83.8 percent).

Michael Bennett anchored the Seattle defensive line, leading the team with seven sacks, while teammate Bruce Irvin ranked second with 6.5 and intercepted two passes, returning both for touchdowns. Behind them, linebackers K. J. Wright and Pro Bowl selection Bobby Wagner combined for a staggering 211 tackles (107 for Wright, 104 for Wagner), while Wright also forced three fumbles. But the strongest aspect of the team's number one ranked defense was their secondary. Known as the "Legion of Boom", they sent three of their four starters to the Pro Bowl for the second year in a row: cornerback Richard Sherman, free safety Earl Thomas, and strong safety Kam Chancellor. Sherman led the team with four interceptions, while Thomas had 97 tackles and forced four fumbles. Chancellor had 78 tackles and also recorded six passes deflected.

=== Playoffs ===
New England became the first playoff team to overcome two 14-point deficits to win a game as they defeated the Baltimore Ravens 35–31, pulling ahead for the first time in the game on Brady's 23-yard touchdown pass to LaFell with 5:13 left in regulation. Then safety Duron Harmon iced the game by intercepting a pass from Joe Flacco in the end zone on Baltimore's ensuing drive. Although New England only had 14 rushing yards, Brady's franchise playoff record 33 completions for 367 yards and three touchdowns, along with a rushing score, were able to make up the difference.

The Patriots had a much easier time in the AFC Championship Game against the Indianapolis Colts. Although the score was still a close 17–7 by the end of the half, New England dominated the game in the second with touchdowns on their first four drives. Brady had another great game, throwing for 226 yards and three touchdowns with one interception, while Blount rushed for 148 yards and three scores. New England's defense held Colts quarterback Andrew Luck, who had thrown for 4,761 yards and 40 touchdowns during the season, to just 12/23 completions for 126 yards. By the end of New England's two postseason games, Brady set new NFL records for postseason passing yards and touchdowns, while coach Bill Belichick set the all-time record for most playoff wins.

Seattle started off their postseason with a 31–17 win over the Carolina Panthers. The score was just 14–10 at the end of the first half, but the Seahawks took control of the game in the second, scoring 17 unanswered points. After a field goal and Russell Wilson's 25-yard touchdown pass to Luke Willson, Chancellor put the game completely out of reach by intercepting a pass from Cam Newton and returning it 90 yards for a touchdown.

Seattle had to mount a furious comeback to defeat their next opponent, the Green Bay Packers, as they fell behind 16–0 before Jon Ryan's 19-yard touchdown pass to Garry Gilliam on a fake field goal in the third quarter got them their first score. They still found themselves trailing 19–7 with just over 5 minutes left when Wilson threw his fourth interception of the day. But after Green Bay was forced to punt, Wilson led the team 69 yards to make the score 19–14 on his 1-yard touchdown run. On the ensuing kickoff, receiver Chris Matthews recovered an onside kick for Seattle, and they took their first lead on a 24-yard touchdown run from Marshawn Lynch. Now with the score 20–19, the Seahawks managed to go up by 3 points on a dramatic 2-point conversion play in which Wilson was forced to run all the way back to the 17-yard line near the right sideline before hurling the ball to the opposite side of the field, where Luke Willson, who had only been assigned as a blocker for the play, caught the ball and took it into the end zone. Although Green Bay kicked a field goal to send the game into overtime, Seattle's comeback could not be stopped. After winning the coin toss, the Seahawks took the ball and drove 87 yards to win the game on Wilson's 35-yard touchdown pass to Kearse, sending the Seahawks to the Super Bowl for the second year in a row.

=== Pregame notes ===
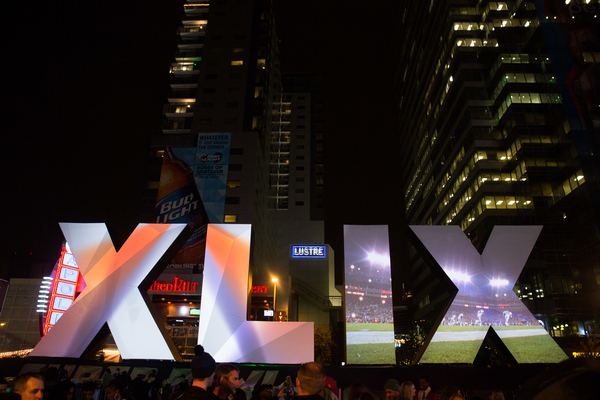
Downtown Phoenix before the event.

Super Bowl XLIX was the first Super Bowl matchup, and the first postseason matchup, between the Patriots and Seahawks; while Seattle was part of the AFC before moving to the NFC in the NFL's 2002 realignment, the teams had never met beyond the regular season.

The game was notable for featuring the coach of one team who had replaced the other as head coach; Patriots head coach Bill Belichick was hired in 2000 to replace Pete Carroll, who went on to become the coach of the Seahawks. This was only the third time this has occurred. The other three times were in Super Bowl III (Weeb Ewbank's New York Jets vs. Ewbank's former team, Don Shula's Baltimore Colts), and Super Bowl XXXVII (Jon Gruden's Tampa Bay Buccaneers vs. Gruden's former team, Bill Callahan's Oakland Raiders). The only previous time that the old coach's former team had won was in Super Bowl XXXIII.

Seahawks linebacker Malcolm Smith, despite being the MVP of the preceding Super Bowl XLVIII, had been returned to a reserve role for the 2014 season and did not play in Super Bowl XLIX, since defensive coordinator Dan Quinn opted to retain Bruce Irvin, K. J. Wright and Bobby Wagner as the starting linebacker trio.

The betting odds for Super Bowl XLIX initially opened after the conclusion of the conference championship games with the Seahawks favored by 2.5 points, but within hours of opening, heavy betting on the Patriots had moved the line to a pick 'em at most sportsbooks. Over most of the two-week run-up to the Super Bowl, the line held steady with the Patriots as slight 1-point favorites, but, on the day before the Super Bowl, a surge of large bets on the Seahawks pushed the line back to a toss-up.

After the AFC Championship Game, ESPN reported an NFL investigation discovered 11 of 12 footballs the Patriots had used during it were under-inflated, while none of the balls used by the Colts had been, although these findings were later shown to be false. Patriots coach Bill Belichick denied any knowledge that the footballs his team used were not inflated to NFL standards. Tom Brady and Bill Belichick became large targets as controversy swirled around what colloquially became known as Deflategate just before the week of Super Bowl XLIX. The effects of the incident would drag on for nearly two years, finally being resolved with Brady receiving a 4-game suspension at the start of the 2016 season.

As the designated home team in the annual rotation between AFC and NFC teams, the Seahawks elected to wear their college navy home jerseys with navy pants, which meant that the Patriots would wear their white road jerseys.

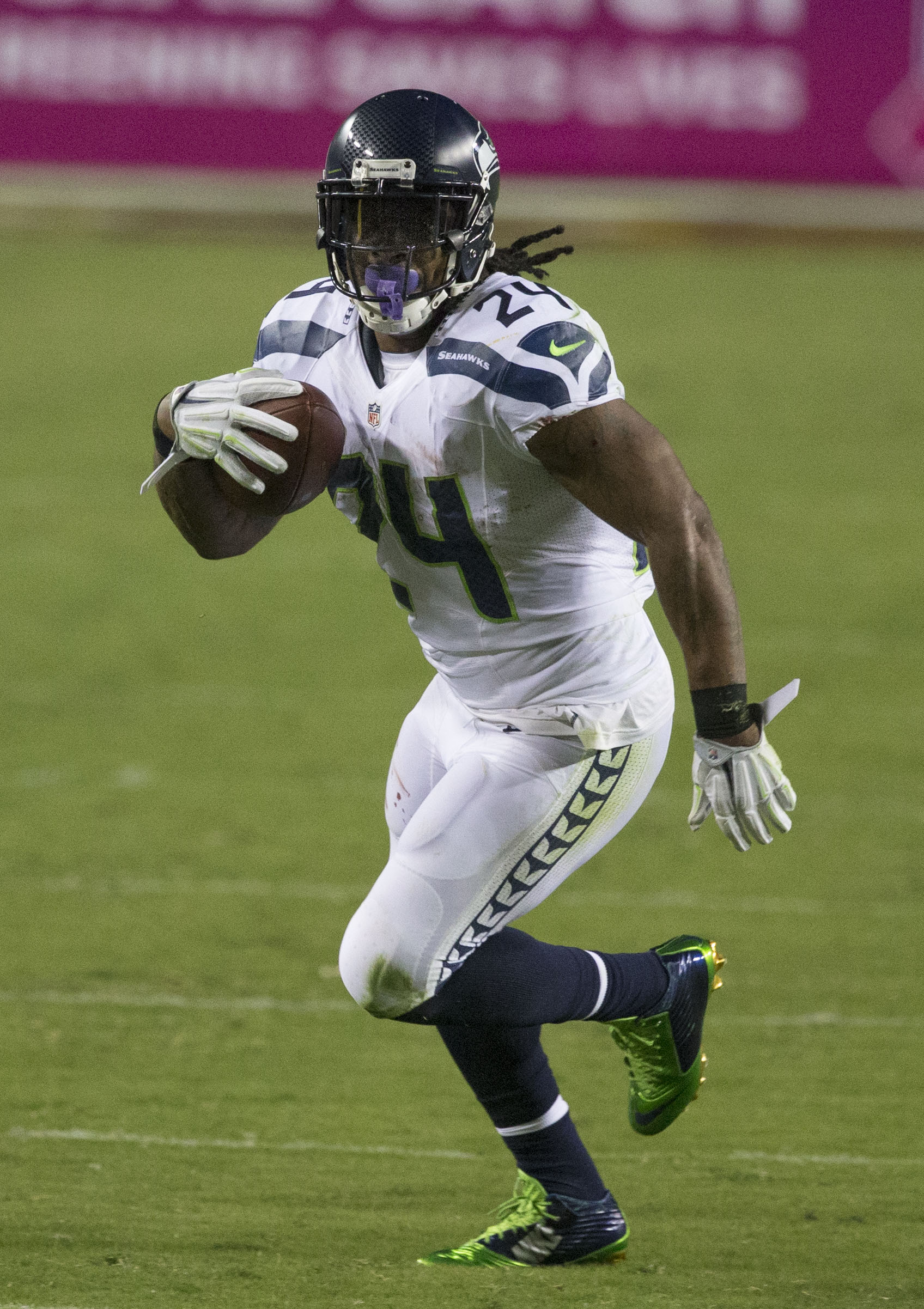
Marshawn Lynch media availability before Super Bowl XLIX became a viral moment as he answered every question with "I'm just here so I won't get fined."

During his press availability, Seattle's running back Marshawn Lynch famously answered every question with "I'm here so i won't get fined."

Super Bowl XLIX was the first Super Bowl to be played in a retractable roof stadium with the roof open by league decision (previous Super Bowls played in such stadiums, including Super Bowl XLII, were played with the roof closed). The gametime temperature was 66 °F (19 °C), with clear conditions. It was the second time all season, along with the Pro Bowl, the stadium had its roof open during an NFL game or the College Football Playoff's Fiesta Bowl. It is the home stadium of the Arizona Cardinals, but all Cardinals home games in 2014 had it closed either because of warm temperatures or to provide home field advantage and hold in crowd noise.

The Patriots had also appeared in the only other Super Bowl to be held at University of Phoenix Stadium to date, having fallen short in their quest for a 19–0 undefeated season with a 17–14 loss to the New York Giants there in Super Bowl XLII. In fact, this game marked the Patriots' return to University of Phoenix Stadium for the first time since that contest.

==== Team facilities ====
The Patriots used the Arizona Cardinals headquarters, in Tempe, Arizona, while the Seahawks used the Arizona State University practice facilities, also in Tempe.

==== Tickets ====
Ticket prices for Super Bowl XLIX rose quickly, with the lowest-cost tickets reaching over $8,000 by January 29. The average ticket price charged by brokers was $10,352, an increase of more than three times over the previous year's prices. The raise in ticket prices was due to a shortage caused by the short selling practice of brokers and resale sites. Jeff Miller, writing for the Orange County Register, observed that the cheapest tickets were nearly as expensive as a year's tuition at the University of Phoenix, and commented that the $28,888 price of seats near the 50-yard line "should not only buy you Katy Perry's halftime show but also Katy Perry singing again from your backseat halfway through your drive home."

== Broadcasting ==
=== Television ===
==== United States ====
Super Bowl XLIX was televised by NBC in the United States, with play-by-play announcer Al Michaels and color analyst Cris Collinsworth calling the game from the booth and Michele Tafoya working as sideline reporter. Game coverage was preceded by a six-hour pre-game show featuring the Football Night in America crew, including Bob Costas, Dan Patrick, Josh Elliott, Tony Dungy, Rodney Harrison, Hines Ward, Mike Florio and Peter King. John Harbaugh served as a guest analyst. Michaels, Collinsworth and Tafoya also contributed to the pre-game coverage along with Liam McHugh, Carolyn Manno, Randy Moss and Doug Flutie. It became the most watched broadcast in the history of American television, only one year removed from Fox's previous year's record-setting telecast of Super Bowl XLVIII. The presentation of the Lombardi Trophy was handled by Dan Patrick of NBC.

A Spanish language telecast of the game was carried by NBC Universo, with play-by-play announcer René Giraldo and color analyst Edgar López. Formerly known as mun2, the network's re-branding was scheduled to coincide with the game. As with other major events broadcast by the network, the telecast was cross-promoted with other NBCUniversal properties, with various NBC News and NBC Sports programs either broadcast from Phoenix or featuring reports from the game. Golf Channel cross-promoted the game with its early-round coverage of the Phoenix Open golf tournament (the weekend rounds of the tournament aired on CBS, as per agreements for CBS and NBC to swap tournaments if they conflict with the Super Bowl or Winter Olympics), and aired live episodes of Feherty from the Orpheum Theatre featuring NFL personalities as guests.

An episode of The Blacklist, "Luther Braxton", served as NBC's lead-out program. Following a break for late local programming, NBC also aired a special live episode of its late-night talk show The Tonight Show Starring Jimmy Fallon from the Orpheum.

===== Advertising =====
NBC set the sales rate for a 30-second advertisement at US$4.5 million, a price $500,000 above the record set by the two preceding Super Bowls. For the first time, the network also offered 15-second ad spots. A large number of automotive advertisers reduced their advertising during the game, replaced by a wave of fifteen first-time Super Bowl advertisers, including Skittles, Carnival Cruise Lines, Loctite, Wix.com, Jublia, a coalition of Mexican avocado growers, and Always among several others. NBC posted the commercials on a Tumblr blog as they aired throughout the game; the blog was promoted through NBC's own live stream, as it did not contain all of the same commercials as the television broadcast. The network had more difficulty than in recent years selling out the advertisements, with the last ads selling out four days before the game.

Paramount Pictures, Universal Studios, Walt Disney Studios, 20th Century Fox, and Lionsgate paid for movie trailers to be aired during the Super Bowl. Paramount paid for The SpongeBob Movie: Sponge Out of Water and Terminator Genisys. Universal paid for Fifty Shades of Grey, Pitch Perfect 2, Jurassic World, Minions, Furious 7, and the debut trailer for Ted 2. Fox paid for Kingsman: The Secret Service. Lionsgate paid for The Divergent Series: Insurgent during the pre-game show. Disney paid for Tomorrowland.

==== International ====
Super Bowl XLIX aired on Seven Network, 7mate, and ESPN in Australia, CTV in Canada, Sky Television in New Zealand, and Channel 4, Sky Sports, and BBC Radio 5 Live in the United Kingdom and Ireland.

NFL Network produced an international television feed of the game carried in some markets, with alternate English-language commentary provided by Bob Papa (play-by-play) and Charles Davis (color analyst).

The Canadian broadcast was the most-watched broadcast on television that week, with 8.26 million viewers, while the pregame ceremonies in the half-hour preceding the game attracted 5.16 million viewers, making it the second most-watched program of the week. In the United Kingdom, the game was watched by 191,000 viewers, making it the eighth highest-rated program on Sky Sports 1 that week. It was the most viewed broadcast on pay television in Australia that day, with 94,000 viewers.

The game aired live in France on channel W9.

The game was broadcast live in India on Sony SIX.

=== Streaming ===
NBC livestreamed the game for free on NBCSports.com on computers and the NBC Sports Live Extra app on tablets. Mobile device rights were exclusive to Verizon Wireless NFL Mobile for its subscribers who pay for NFL Mobile and they had to use NFL Mobile app instead of NBC Sports Live Extra.

=== Radio ===
==== National coverage ====
The game was broadcast nationally on Westwood One radio, with Kevin Harlan as play-by-play announcer, Boomer Esiason as color analyst, and James Lofton and Mark Malone as sideline reporters. Jim Gray anchored the pre-game and halftime coverage, with Larry Fitzgerald, Tom Brady, Scott Graham, Rod Woodson and Kurt Warner contributing. Scott Graham also handled public address duties inside the stadium for pregame introductions and postgame awards.

==== Local market coverage ====
The flagship stations of each station in the markets of each team carried their local play-by-play calls. In Seattle, KIRO-FM (97.3) and KIRO (710 AM) carried the game, with Steve Raible on play-by-play and Warren Moon on color commentary. As a clear-channel station, KIRO's commentary was audible over much of the West Coast of North America after sunset. In Greater Boston, WBZ-FM (98.5) carried the game, with Bob Socci on play-by-play and Scott Zolak on color commentary. Per contractual rules, the rest of the stations in the Seahawks and Patriots radio networks carried the Westwood One feed.

==== International radio coverage ====
Westwood One's coverage was simulcast on TSN Radio in Canada.

In the United Kingdom, BBC Radio 5 Live returned to coverage after the previous year's NFL broadcaster, Absolute Radio 90s, dropped out of sports coverage. Rocky Boiman and Darren Fletcher return as commentators.

== Entertainment ==
=== Pregame ===
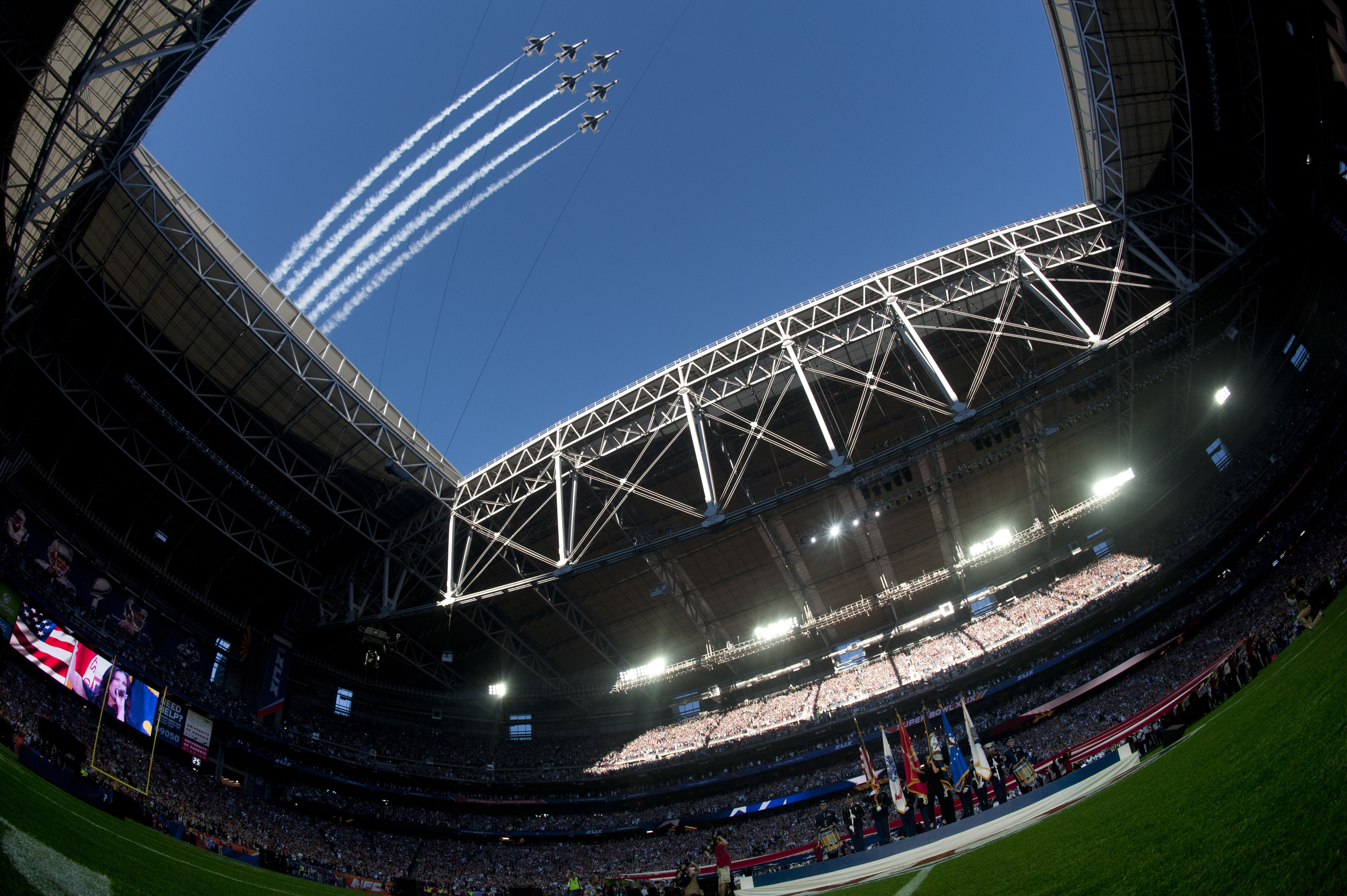
The U.S. Air Force Thunderbirds perform a flyover during opening ceremonies for the Super Bowl XLIX at the University of Phoenix Stadium, Feb. 1, 2015. (U.S. Air Force photo by Staff Sgt. Staci Miller)

Idina Menzel performed the national anthem and John Legend performed "America the Beautiful". The anthem concluded with a flyover by the U.S. Air Force Thunderbirds demonstration team flying their custom painted F-16C Fighting Falcons.

=== Halftime show ===
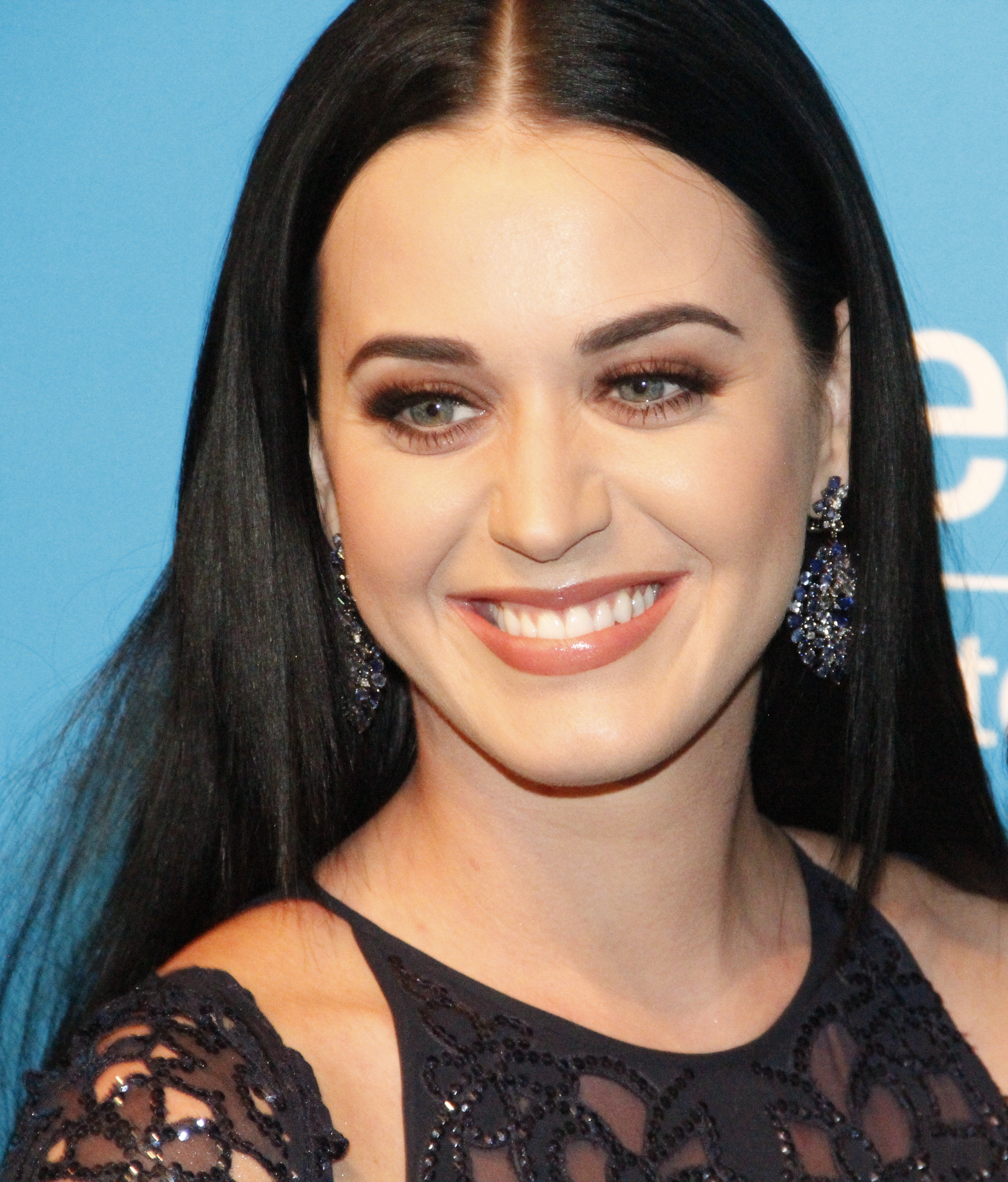
Katy Perry headlined the halftime show

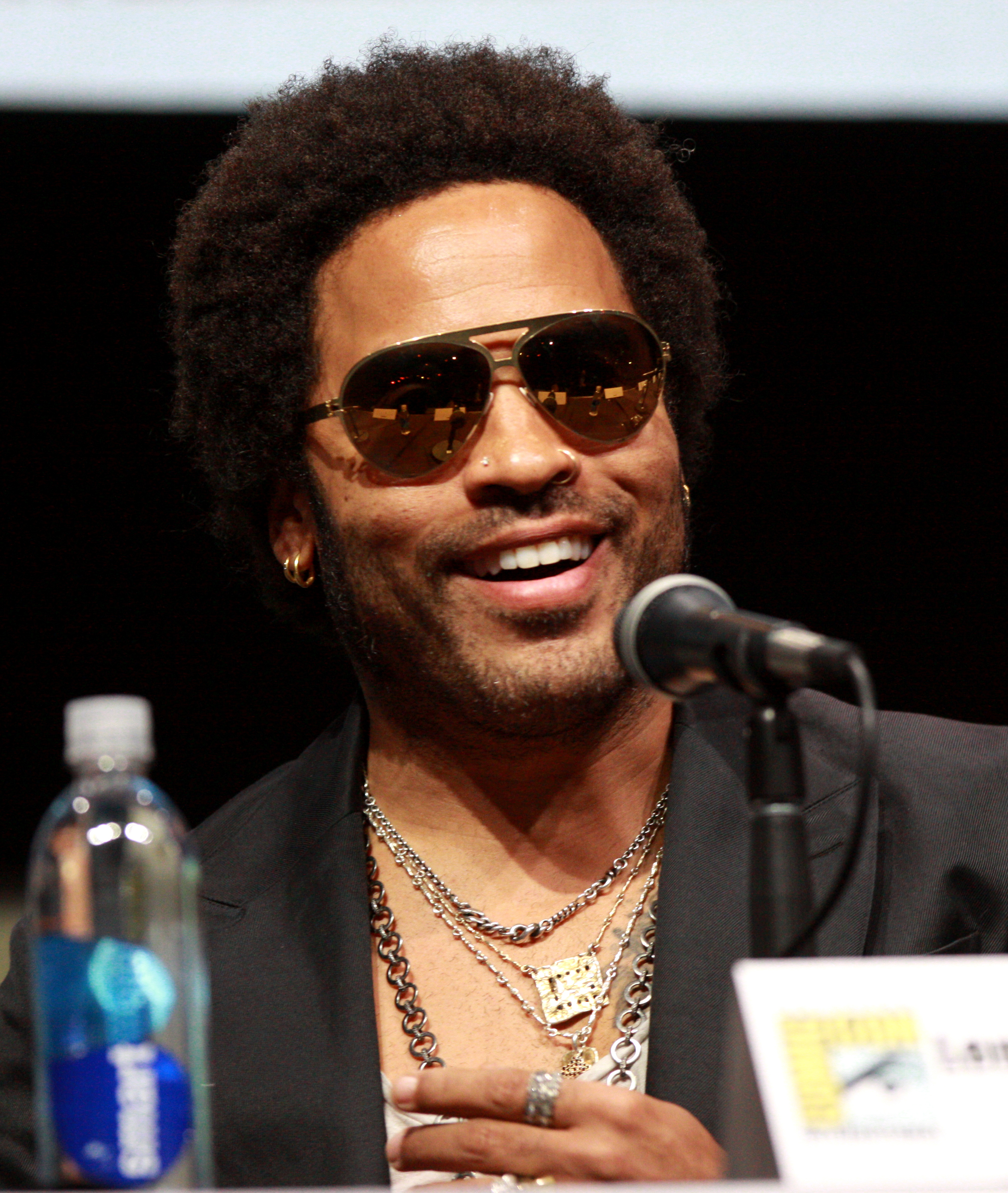
Lenny Kravitz made an appearance at the halftime show

On October 9, 2014, Billboard announced that Katy Perry would perform at halftime and the NFL confirmed the announcement on November 23, 2014. At the start of the halftime show, on-field participants held up light globes which created a bird's-eye view of the Pepsi logo. Perry entered the stadium riding atop a large, golden mechanical lion, opening her set with a performance of "Roar". She then proceeded to sing "Dark Horse", with 3D rendering on the field creating a chessboard visual where the turf constantly turned into "different shapes and sizes", as acrobats surrounded the singer. Following this, Perry joined Lenny Kravitz for a duet version of "I Kissed a Girl", which included her "rubbing up against" Kravitz and flames exploding behind them. During these three songs, Perry was clothed in a "flame-adorned" dress, with her black hair in a ponytail. The costume has been described as the "clothing equivalent of a flame", and "dress of fire". The stage and field rendering transitioned into a "breezy" beach setting, with dancers dressed as sharks, palm trees and smiling beach balls dancing around Perry. She underwent a wardrobe change, and progressed into a "campy" medley of "Teenage Dream" and "California Gurls". Rapper Missy Elliott subsequently appeared, performing her songs "Get Ur Freak On" and "Work It", while Perry played "hype-woman" beside her, having now changed once again into a custom Super Bowl 49 jersey. After Perry briefly disappeared, Elliott performed "Lose Control". Perry returned, now sporting a "star-encrusted gown" for her closing song, "Firework". She rose out of midfield on a narrow platform that was attached to a shooting star prop, and flew above the crowds. During this performance, fireworks exploded around Perry and the stadium. The star Perry flew around the stadium attached to was heavily compared to The More You Know's public service announcements logo. It is the most-watched halftime show of all time, with a total TV audience of 120.7 million.

In August 2014, it was reported that the NFL had a short list of three potential acts for the Super Bowl XLIX halftime show, including Coldplay, Katy Perry, and Rihanna. It was also reported by The Wall Street Journal that league representatives asked representatives of potential acts if they would be willing to provide financial compensation to the NFL in exchange for their appearance, in the form of either an up-front fee, or a cut of revenue from concert performances made following the Super Bowl. While these reports were denied by an NFL spokeswoman, the request had, according to the Journal, received a "chilly" response from those involved.

== Game summary ==
External videos
- Full game broadcast on NBC on YouTube

=== First half ===
After the teams exchanged punts to start the game, the Patriots got the first scoring opportunity with a drive to the Seahawks' 10-yard line. However, on 3rd-and-6, quarterback Tom Brady threw a pass that was intercepted and returned to the 14-yard line by cornerback Jeremy Lane. Lane broke his wrist and tore his ACL on the play when he tried to break his fall with his arm extended after being tackled by wide receiver Julian Edelman, and was subsequently taken out of the game. After the Patriots forced another Seahawks punt to start the second quarter, they mounted a 65-yard drive in nine plays, which began with Brady's 17-yard pass to wide receiver Danny Amendola. Brady later completed a 23-yard pass to Edelman on 3rd-and-9, then finished the drive with an 11-yard touchdown pass to wide receiver Brandon LaFell two plays later, giving the Patriots a 7–0 lead.

After another exchange of punts, the Seahawks began to make progress when quarterback Russell Wilson completed his first pass of the day, a 6-yard completion to wide receiver Jermaine Kearse on 3rd-and-6 and with 5:36 left in the half. Wilson then completed a 44-yard pass to wide receiver Chris Matthews on the Patriots' 11-yard line. Running back Marshawn Lynch also recorded six runs for a total gain of 25 yards during the drive, the last run being for a 3-yard touchdown to tie the game, 7–7. Only 2:16 remained in the half after Lynch's touchdown, but both teams' offenses abruptly exploded in the final two minutes of the half. Brady completed five of six passes for 59 yards on the Patriots' ensuing possession, including three passes to running back Shane Vereen for 26 yards, and finished the drive with a 22-yard touchdown completion to tight end Rob Gronkowski with 31 seconds remaining in the half. Taking the ball back on their own 20, the Seahawks started off their drive with a 19-yard burst from running back Robert Turbin and a 17-yard scramble by Wilson. Then Wilson completed a 23-yard pass to wide receiver Ricardo Lockette, with a face-mask penalty on cornerback Kyle Arrington adding an extra 11 yards that gave the Seahawks a first down on the Patriots' 11-yard line. Only six seconds remained until halftime at this point, but Seahawks head coach Pete Carroll decided to take a shot at the end zone rather than kick a field goal, a gamble that paid off as Wilson threw an 11-yard touchdown pass to Matthews on the next play, tying the game at 14 with just two seconds showing on the clock. This was Matthews' first NFL career touchdown.

=== Second half ===
The Seahawks took the second-half kickoff and drove 72 yards to the Patriots' 8-yard line, featuring a 15-yard run by Lynch and a 45-yard reception by Matthews. After Lynch was stopped for no gain on 3rd-and-1 in the red zone, kicker Stephen Hauschka finished the drive with a 27-yard field goal, giving the Seahawks their first lead of the game, 17–14. On the Patriots' next possession, Seahawks linebacker Bobby Wagner intercepted a Brady pass and returned it 6 yards to the Patriots' 34-yard line, but an illegal blocking penalty against cornerback Richard Sherman after Wagner's interception forced the Seahawks to start their ensuing possession at midfield. Just as with their last interception, the Seahawks lost a key defensive player to injury. Defensive end Cliff Avril lay on the field motionless. After finally getting to his feet, he entered concussion protocol and did not re-enter the game. The Seahawks' pass rush, particularly Michael Bennett inside and Avril outside, had hurried Brady into several drive-ending incompletions as well as the first interception. Wrote Gregg Bell of the Tacoma News Tribune, "At times that night in the desert Bennett and Avril controlled the line of scrimmage almost by themselves." With Avril out, the Patriots were able to double-team Bennett and give Brady more time in the pocket.

Despite the penalty against Sherman, the Seahawks' offense took advantage of the turnover, driving 50 yards in six plays, which featured three runs by Lynch for 18 yards and a 15-yard scramble by Wilson. The drive ended with Wilson's 3-yard touchdown pass to wide receiver Doug Baldwin, who was penalized 15 yards on the kickoff after the play for an inappropriate celebration. The score increased the Seahawks' lead to 24–14, and it would remain this way going into the fourth quarter. Until this game, no team in Super Bowl history had come back to win after facing a fourth-quarter deficit of more than a touchdown.

With 12:10 left in the game, the Patriots mounted a 68-yard drive to cut their deficit to a field goal at 24–21 on Brady's 4-yard touchdown toss to Amendola. The drive included two 21-yard completions from Brady to Edelman, the first one converting a 3rd-and-14 in what was described by Bleacher Report as "the NFL's worst nightmare". Edelman was clearly concussed by safety Kam Chancellor's helmet-to-helmet hit, "suffering an apparent brain injury, staggering around on the field in plain view of the biggest television audience ever, per Deadline.com, and receiving no treatment." Dave Birkett of the Detroit Free Press reported that "a medical observer was overheard radioing someone a second time saying Edelman needed to be examined." "I thought he was going to go to sleep the way he was running," LaFell told Matt Pentz of The Seattle Times. Nevertheless, Edelman remained in the game and eventually caught the game-winning touchdown pass.

Following a three-and-out for the Seahawks, the Patriots got the ball back on their own 32 at the 6:52 mark. Brady started off the possession with two completions to Vereen for 13 yards, and followed it up with a 9-yard pass to Edelman. Following an offensive pass interference penalty against Amendola (which was mistakenly called against Edelman), Gronkowski caught a pair of passes that moved the team up 33 yards to the Seahawks' 19-yard line. Over the next three plays, Vereen rushed for 7 yards, Brady passed to LaFell for 7 more, and running back LeGarrette Blount ran the ball 2 yards to the 3-yard line. Finally, with 2:02 left in the game, Brady gave the Patriots a 28–24 lead with a 3-yard touchdown pass to Edelman.

After a touchback gave the Seahawks the ball on their 20-yard line, with a chance to mount a game-winning drive, Wilson started off with a 31-yard completion to Lynch. Then after two incompletions, Wilson picked up another first down with an 11-yard pass to Lockette. The following play gave the Seahawks an opportunity to win the game. Wilson threw a deep pass down the right sideline to Kearse, who was covered by cornerback Malcolm Butler. Both players dove through the air for the ball, and Butler managed to deflect it with one hand, but the pass fell right into the hands of Kearse, who tipped it to himself and caught the ball while he was lying on his back. Butler managed to recognize the catch and recover in time to shove Kearse out of bounds as he got up, preventing a Seahawks touchdown, but the play netted 33 yards and set up 1st-and-goal for the Seahawks at the Patriots' 5-yard line with 1:05 left in the game. Announcer Cris Collinsworth compared the play to two other acrobatic receptions by Patriots opponents, both of the New York Giants, that had defeated them in prior Super Bowls: David Tyree's Helmet Catch in Super Bowl XLII (which took place at the same stadium) and Mario Manningham's sideline catch in Super Bowl XLVI. Al Michaels also compared it to Antonio Freeman's famous Monday Night Football catch known as "He did what?" (a play that Michaels had himself called).

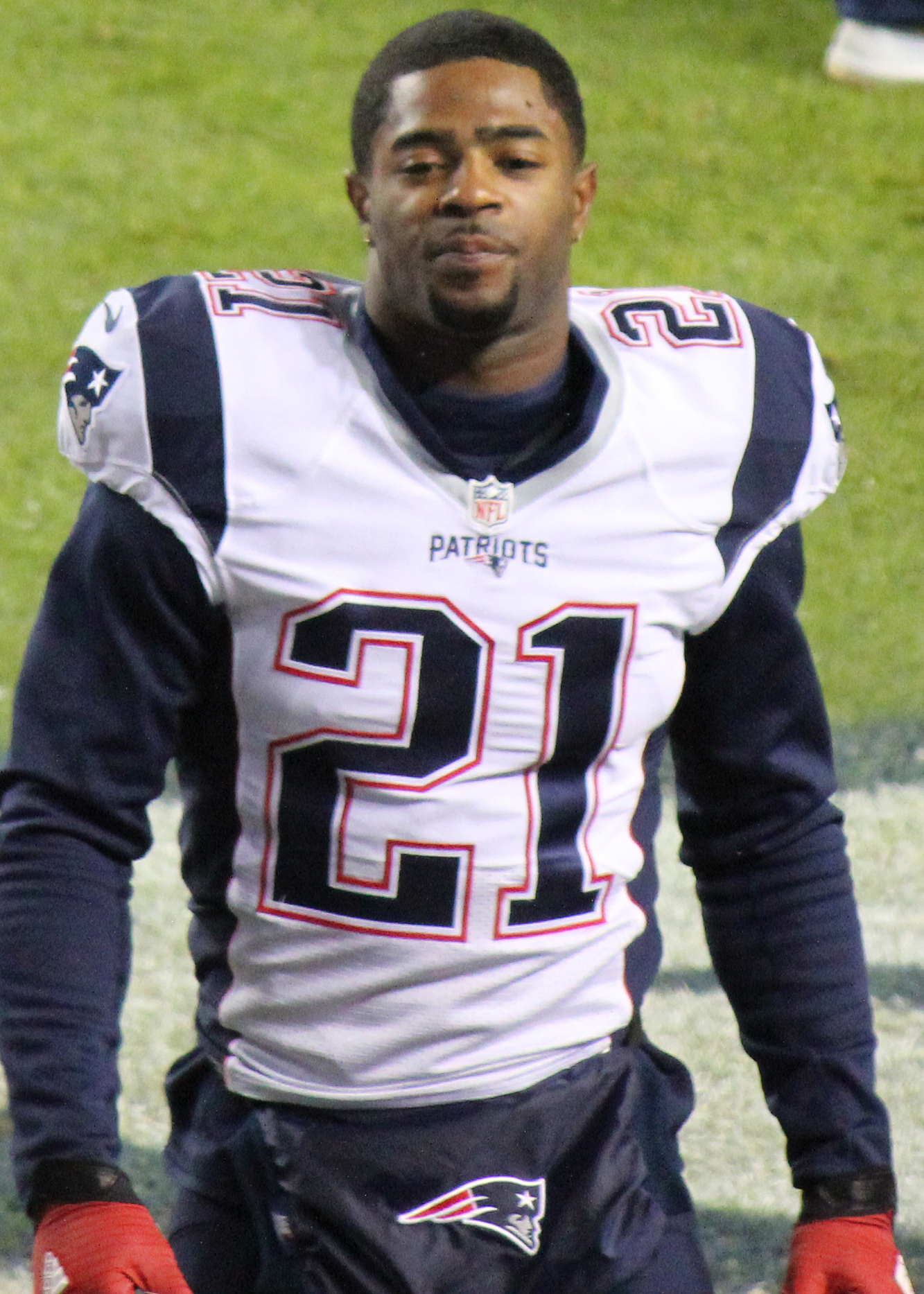
Malcolm Butler, seen here in 2015, made the game-clinching interception

On the next play, Lynch ran the ball 4 yards to the 1-yard line where he was brought down by linebacker Dont'a Hightower. Since the Patriots did not call a timeout, the Seahawks were able to run the clock down to 26 seconds before taking the snap for the next play. The Seahawks called a pass play in which Kearse would run a pick on the right side of the field to draw defensive backs away from Lockette as Lockette ran a slant to the middle, but cornerback Brandon Browner blocked Kearse at the line of scrimmage, preventing him from reaching Butler. Lockette appeared to be uncovered at the 1-yard line when Wilson threw him the ball, but before the ball arrived, Butler correctly read the play and rushed into position to make the interception. The turnover—after an unsportsmanlike conduct call for excessive celebration—gave the Patriots the ball on their own 1-yard line with 20 seconds remaining in the game.

The game was not quite over at this point. Since the ball was placed on the 1-yard line, Brady had to take the snap in his own end zone. If he took a knee or the Patriots otherwise failed to advance the ball beyond the goal line, this would be a safety, awarding the Seahawks two points, cutting the Patriots' lead to 28–26, and forcing the Patriots to kick the ball back to the Seahawks who could win with a field goal. However, Bennett moved across the line of scrimmage, earning a 5-yard encroachment penalty against the Seahawks' defense and moving the ball to the 6-yard line. Brady then took a knee, the Seahawks called their final timeout, and linebacker Bruce Irvin rushed some of the Patriots' players, starting a brawl involving players from both teams that resulted in a personal foul penalty for the Seahawks for another 15 yards. Irvin received the first ejection in Super Bowl history for throwing a closed hand punch at Gronkowski. Brady knelt one more time at the 21-yard line and the Patriots had won their first Super Bowl title in 10 years.

=== Game statistics ===
Brady completed 37 of 50 passes for 328 yards and four touchdowns, with two interceptions. His 37 completions set a new Super Bowl record, surpassing Peyton Manning's 34 set the previous year against the Seahawks in Super Bowl XLVIII. He also surpassed Joe Montana's record for career touchdown passes in Super Bowls, setting a new record with 13. His top receiver was Edelman, who caught 9 passes for 109 yards and a touchdown, while also rushing for seven yards and returning three punts for 27 additional yards. Vereen caught 11 passes for 64 yards and rushed for 13. For the Seahawks, Wilson completed 12 of 21 passes for 247 yards and two touchdowns, with one interception, while also rushing for 39 yards. Lynch was the top rusher of the game with 102 yards and a touchdown, and also caught a pass for 31 yards. Matthews, an undrafted rookie who had not caught any passes in the regular season or postseason before the Super Bowl, caught four passes for 109 yards and a touchdown. Wagner had 12 tackles (10 solo) and an interception. Linebacker K. J. Wright had 11 tackles (10 solo). The Patriots became only the fourth team to win a Super Bowl despite losing the turnover battle (after the Baltimore Colts in Super Bowl V and the Pittsburgh Steelers in both Super Bowls XIV and XL).

In winning, Brady became the third quarterback in NFL history with four Super Bowl victories. Brady was also named MVP for a third time, tying the record set by Joe Montana. The Seahawks became the first defending champion since the Green Bay Packers in Super Bowl XXXII to lose in the Super Bowl the next year. This also marked the 10th consecutive Super Bowl without a repeat winner (with the last one being the Patriots in Super Bowl XXXIX).

In a poll conducted by NFL.com a couple of months after the game, Super Bowl XLIX was voted by its readers as the "greatest Super Bowl game" of all time. The article does report that the voting was structured to try to account for "recency bias" in relation to the game at the time when the poll was conducted, but voters still "pushed it through the competition". Most lists of greatest Super Bowls continue to list it in the top few games.

=== Reactions to Seattle's final play ===
Lynch in the backfield, Russell looks, throws inside – oh, my God, it's picked off at the goal line! It's picked off by Butler intended for Lockette at the goal line with 20 seconds left! Oh, my word!

— Steve Raible on the Seahawks radio broadcast on KIRO-FM and KIRO AM

Russell Wilson extends the hands – he has it. Wilson, quick throw and it's – intercepted! Intercepted by Malcolm Butler! Butler has it at the 1! Malcolm Butler stepped in front of the throw! (Color commentator Scott Zolak: "No way!") And the Patriots have possession with 20 seconds to go in Super Bowl XLIX with a 4-point lead over the Seahawks!

— Bob Socci on the Patriots radio broadcast on WBZ-FM (98.5 The Sports Hub)

It's gotta be one of the dumbest calls offensively in Super Bowl history. You are on the 1-yard line and you have #24 and you drop back pass? Are you kidding me? And also, they ran a pick play – an illegal pick! You deserve an interception!

— Scott Zolak on color commentary on the Patriots radio broadcast on WBZ-FM (98.5 The Sports Hub)

After the game, the Seahawks faced heavy criticism for their decision to call a pass play on second and goal from the 1-yard line with 26 seconds and one timeout left instead of a rushing play. Following the play, Collinsworth stated, "I'm sorry, but I can't believe the call. … I cannot believe the call. You've got Marshawn Lynch in the backfield. You've got a guy that has been borderline unstoppable in this part of the field. I can't believe the call." He further added, "If I lose the Super Bowl because Marshawn Lynch can't get it in from the 1 yard line, so be it. So be it! But there is no way... I don't believe the call." Sports Illustrated writer Peter King called the play one of the worst calls in Super Bowl history, as did retired Pro Football Hall of Famer Deion Sanders. Retired running back Emmitt Smith, the NFL's all-time leading rusher, went even further, calling it the worst play call in the history of football. NFL Films similarly ranked it as the #1 worst play in NFL history. Others, including Michigan Wolverines head coach Jim Harbaugh and Hall of Fame quarterback Joe Namath, defended the call, crediting Butler for the play he made and pointing out that the Seahawks only had one timeout left. Writing for Grantland, Bill Simmons said the Seahawks "took too much heat for the final play call" and noted Carroll opted to run the ball on fourth down at the end of the 2006 Rose Bowl, costing his team the game.

Butler's interception, thanks to his quick "read-and-react to Ricardo Lockette's underneath route", has been considered one of the top clutch plays in Super Bowl history. It would also be a launching point for Butler's career. Butler, an undrafted rookie who had started only one game during the season, had entered Super Bowl XLIX listed #5 on the Patriots' depth chart. But after this game, he would go on to start in all but one of the Patriots games over the next three seasons, as well as leading the team in interceptions in 2016, a season in which he helped them win another Super Bowl.

In the game, Lynch had gained at least one yard on 22 of 24 carries. While the Patriots in 2014 were ranked fifth-worst (28th overall) in the league in holding opposing backs for no gain or a loss, they had stopped him for no gain on both a third-and-2 and a third-and-1, the latter in the red zone. On the season, Lynch had scored just once on his five attempts from his opponent's 1-yard line. From 2010 to 2014, he scored 45% of the time, ranking 30th out of 39 running backs; for his career to that point, he was successful on 42% of his attempts (15 of 36). (Note: Rank is among players with at least 10 attempts and includes performance in the playoffs.) (Note: He did not gain a yard on 12 of those attempts, and lost yardage in 9.)

Seahawks offensive coordinator Darrell Bevell acknowledged making the call, but also remarked that Lockette could have been more aggressive on the play. Wilson said the play was a "good call", and lamented throwing the interception and "not making that play." Carroll, though, said the last play was "all my fault", and called Bevell "crucially important to our future." Carroll added that the Seahawks would have run the ball on a subsequent play, as well that "we don't ever call a play thinking we might throw an interception." Butler's interception was the only one against all 109 pass attempts during the 2014 NFL season from the 1-yard line.

=== Box score ===
Super Bowl XLIX: New England Patriots 28, Seattle Seahawks 24

Quarter	1	2	3	4	Total
Patriots (AFC)	0	14	0	14	28
Seahawks (NFC)	0	14	10	0	24

at University of Phoenix Stadium in Glendale, Arizona

- Date: February 1, 2015
- Game time: 4:30 p.m. MST
- Game weather: Sunny, 66 °F (19 °C) (retractable roof open)
- Game attendance: 70,288
- Referee: Bill Vinovich
- TV announcers (NBC): Al Michaels (play-by-play), Cris Collinsworth (color commentator), and Michele Tafoya (sideline reporter)
- Recap, Gamebook

Scoring summary

Quarter	Time	Drive			Team	Scoring information	Score	
Quarter	Time	Plays	Yards	TOP	Team	Scoring information	NE	SEA
2	9:47	9	65	4:10	NE	Brandon LaFell 11-yard touchdown reception from Tom Brady, Stephen Gostkowski kick good	7	0
2	2:16	8	70	4:51	SEA	Marshawn Lynch 3-yard touchdown run, Steven Hauschka kick good	7	7
2	0:31	8	80	1:45	NE	Rob Gronkowski 22-yard touchdown reception from Brady, Gostkowski kick good	14	7
2	0:02	5	80	0:29	SEA	Chris Matthews 11-yard touchdown reception from Russell Wilson, Hauschka kick good	14	14
3	11:09	7	72	3:51	SEA	27-yard field goal by Hauschka	14	17
3	4:54	6	50	3:13	SEA	Doug Baldwin 3-yard touchdown reception from Wilson, Hauschka kick good	14	24
4	7:55	9	68	4:15	NE	Danny Amendola 4-yard touchdown reception from Brady, Gostkowski kick good	21	24
4	2:02	10	64	4:50	NE	Julian Edelman 3-yard touchdown reception from Brady, Gostkowski kick good	28	24
"TOP" = time of possession. For other American football terms, see Glossary of American football.							28	24

== Final statistics ==
Sources: NFL.com, Pro Football Reference.com, The Football Database Super Bowl XLIX

=== Statistical comparison ===
Statistic	New England Patriots	Seattle Seahawks
First downs	25	20
First downs rushing	1	8
First downs passing	21	10
First downs penalty	3	2
Third down efficiency	8/14	3/10
Fourth down efficiency	0/0	0/0
Net yards rushing	57	162
Rushing attempts	21	29
Yards per rush	2.7	5.6
Passing – Completions-attempts	37/50	12/21
Times sacked-total yards	1–8	3–13
Interceptions thrown	2	1
Net yards passing	320	234
Total net yards	377	396
Punt returns-total yards	3–27	2–6
Kickoff returns-total yards	3–49	0–0
Interceptions-total return yards	1–3	2–14
Punts-average yardage	4–49.0	6–44.8
Fumbles-lost	0–0	0–0
Penalties-yards	5–36	7–70
Time of possession	33:46	26:14
Turnovers	2	1

Records set
Most games started	6	Tom Brady (New England)
Most games started at quarterback	6	Tom Brady (New England)
Most pass completions, game	37	Tom Brady (New England)
Most passing touchdowns, career	13	Tom Brady (New England)
Most pass attempts, career	247*	Tom Brady (New England)
Most pass completions, career	164*	Tom Brady (New England)
Most passing yards, career	1,605*	*extended his record
Longest punt	64 yards	Ryan Allen (New England)
Most tackles, career	22	Bobby Wagner (Seattle)
Largest fourth-quarter comeback	10 points	New England
Most first downs earned, passing	21	New England
Fewest kickoff returns, one team	0	Seattle
Fewest kickoff return yards, one team	0	Seattle
Fewest kickoff returns, both teams	3	New England (3), Seattle (0)
Fewest kickoff return yards, both teams	49	New England (49), Seattle (0)
Records tied
Most Super Bowl MVP Awards	3	Tom Brady
Most games played	6	Tom Brady
Most wins as starting QB	4	Tom Brady
Most games as player, assistant, or coach	9	Bill Belichick
Most games, head coach	6	Bill Belichick
Most wins, head coach	4	Bill Belichick
Most Super Bowl appearances	8	New England
Largest comeback	10 points	New England
Fewest first downs rushing	1	New England
Fewest rushing touchdowns	0	New England
Fewest fumbles, both teams	0	
Fewest fumbles lost, both teams	0	
Fewest field goals attempted, both teams	1	New England (0), Seattle (1)

=== Individual leaders ===
Patriots passing
	C/ATT^{1}	Yds	TD	INT	Rating
Tom Brady	37/50	328	4	2	101.1
Patriots rushing
	Car^{2}	Yds	TD	LG^{3}	Yds/Car
LeGarrette Blount	14	40	0	9	2.86
Shane Vereen	4	13	0	7	3.25
Julian Edelman	1	7	0	7	7.00
Tom Brady	2	–3	0	–1	–1.50
Patriots receiving
	Rec^{4}	Yds	TD	LG^{3}	Target^{5}
Shane Vereen	11	64	0	16	12
Julian Edelman	9	109	1	23	12
Rob Gronkowski	6	68	1	22	10
Danny Amendola	5	48	1	17	7
Brandon LaFell	4	29	1	11	7
James Develin	1	6	0	6	1
Michael Hoomanawanui	1	4	0	4	1

Seahawks passing
	C/ATT^{1}	Yds	TD	INT	Rating
Russell Wilson	12/21	247	2	1	110.6
Seahawks rushing
	Car^{2}	Yds	TD	LG^{3}	Yds/Car
Marshawn Lynch	24	102	1	15	4.25
Russell Wilson	3	39	0	17	13.00
Robert Turbin	2	21	0	19	10.50
Seahawks receiving
	Rec^{4}	Yds	TD	LG^{3}	Target^{5}
Chris Matthews	4	109	1	45	5
Ricardo Lockette	3	59	0	25	5
Jermaine Kearse	3	45	0	33	6
Marshawn Lynch	1	31	0	31	2
Doug Baldwin	1	3	1	3	1
Bryan Walters	0	0	0	0	1

^{1}Completions/attempts ^{2}Carries ^{3}Long gain ^{4}Receptions ^{5}Times targeted

== Starting lineups ==
Hall of Fame‡

New England	Position		Seattle
Offense
Brandon LaFell	WR		Doug Baldwin
Nate Solder	LT		Russell Okung
Dan Connolly	LG		James Carpenter
Bryan Stork	C		Max Unger
Ryan Wendell	RG		J. R. Sweezy
Sebastian Vollmer	RT		Justin Britt
Rob Gronkowski	TE		Luke Willson
Julian Edelman	WR		Jermaine Kearse
Tom Brady	QB		Russell Wilson
Michael Hoomanawanui	TE	WR	Ricardo Lockette
Shane Vereen	RB		Marshawn Lynch
Defense
Rob Ninkovich	LE	LDE	Michael Bennett
Vince Wilfork	DT	LDT	Tony McDaniel
Sealver Siliga	DT	RDT	Kevin Williams
Chandler Jones	RE	RDE	Cliff Avril
Jamie Collins	LB	OLB	Bruce Irvin
Dont'a Hightower	LB	MLB	Bobby Wagner
Kyle Arrington	DB	OLB	K. J. Wright
Darrelle Revis‡	LCB		Richard Sherman
Brandon Browner	RCB		Byron Maxwell
Patrick Chung	SS		Kam Chancellor
Devin McCourty	FS		Earl Thomas

== Officials ==
Super Bowl XLIX had seven officials. The numbers in parentheses below indicates their uniform numbers.

- Referee: Bill Vinovich (52), first Super Bowl
- Umpire: Bill Schuster (129), first Super Bowl
- Head linesman: Dana McKenzie (8), first Super Bowl
- Line judge: Mark Perlman (9), third Super Bowl (XL, XLIII)
- Field judge: Bob Waggoner (25), second Super Bowl (XL as BJ)
- Side judge: Tom Hill (97), second Super Bowl (XL)
- Back judge: Terrence Miles (111), first Super Bowl
- Replay official: Mike Wimmer, first Super Bowl
- Replay assistant: Terry Poulos
