= Scott Zolak =

American football player and broadcaster (born 1967)

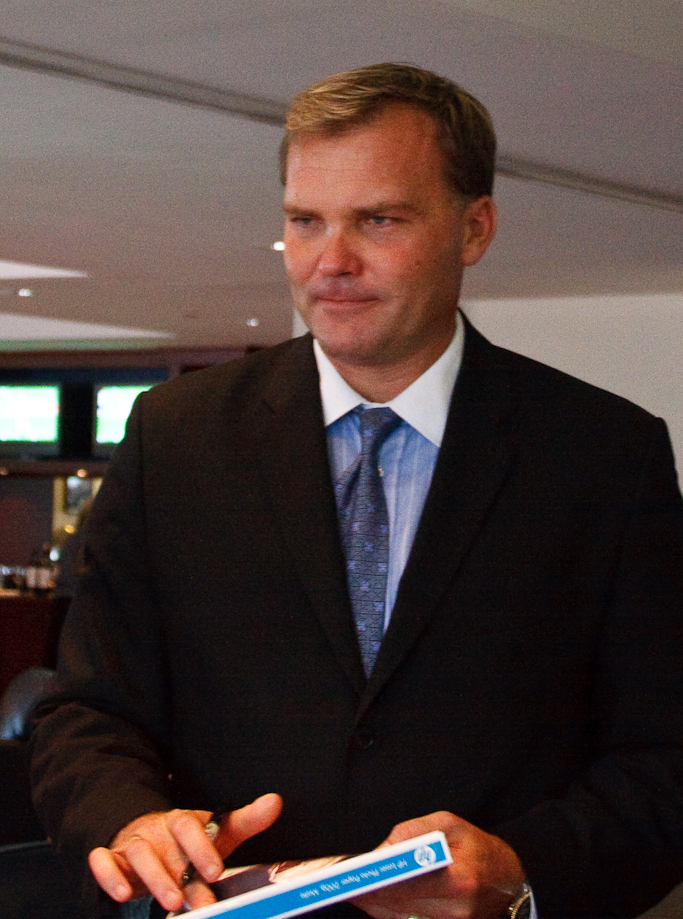
- Zolak in 2009

No. 16, 14
- Position: Quarterback

Personal information
- Born: December 13, 1967 (age 58); Pittsburgh, Pennsylvania, U.S.
- Listed height: 6 ft 5 in (1.96 m)
- Listed weight: 230 lb (104 kg)

Career information
- High school: Ringgold (Monongahela, Pennsylvania)
- College: Maryland (1986-1990)
- NFL draft: 1991: 4th round, 85th overall pick

Career history
- New England Patriots (1991–1998); New York Jets (1999)*; Miami Dolphins (1999)
- * Offseason or practice squad member only

Career NFL statistics
- Passing attempts: 248
- Passing completions: 124
- Completion percentage: 50.0%
- TD–INT: 8–7
- Passing yards: 1,314
- Passer rating: 64.8
- Stats at Pro Football Reference

Scott David Zolak (born December 13, 1967) is an American broadcaster and former professional football player. He played quarterback in the National Football League (NFL) for nine seasons, primarily with the New England Patriots. Over the course of his career, he played in 55 games, with 7 starts, for the Patriots and Miami Dolphins, completed 124 of 248 passes for 1,314 yards, threw eight touchdowns and seven interceptions, and finished his career with a passer rating of 64.8.

A graduate of Ringgold High School and the University of Maryland, Zolak was selected 84th in the 1991 NFL draft by the New England Patriots. He did not play in 1991, but started four games in 1992 and had his most productive season statistically. When Drew Bledsoe was drafted in 1993, Zolak became his backup for the next six seasons. He appeared as a replacement for Bledsoe when he was hurt, but only started three games during this time. He was released at the end of the 1998 season, and signed with the New York Jets and Miami Dolphins in 1999, playing in one game for Miami before retiring. After his retirement, he became a sportscaster and football analyst in the New England area.

== Early life ==
=== High school ===
Zolak was born on December 13, 1967, in Pittsburgh, Pennsylvania. As a child, was the waterboy for the football team at Ringgold High School in Monongahela, Pennsylvania, where his father, Paul, worked as head coach and athletic director. Future NFL quarterback Joe Montana played for Ringgold during this time and gave Zolak a football, which he later rubbed for good luck before every game. When Zolak attended Ringgold High School himself, he was the team's starting quarterback and punter, and lettered four times. Zolak also played on the Ringgold basketball team as a forward, and was a four-time letterman in that sport as well. As a result of his football performance, he was invited to participate in the Big 33 Football Classic, which featured the top high school football players in Pennsylvania.

=== College ===
After graduating from high school, Zolak played college football at the University of Maryland. He sat out his freshman year, and became the third-string quarterback for the Terrapins behind Dan Henning and Neil O'Donnell after two quarterbacks transferred. By the end of his sophomore season, Zolak was challenging O'Donnell for the starting job after Henning graduated. As his junior year began, in the summer of 1988, offensive coordinator Bob Valesente said that Zolak was making tremendous strides as a quarterback, but O'Donnell was the starting quarterback that year. Zolak's first collegiate appearance came against West Virginia. He completed four of six passes for 28 yards, but had an interception returned for a touchdown by Bo Orlando in a 55–24 loss. He appeared in four games for Maryland that season.

Zolak was again the backup behind O'Donnell in 1989. He played in eight games, completing 33 of 69 passes for 407 yards and two touchdowns. In 1990, after O'Donnell graduated and began his NFL career, Zolak became the starter for Maryland, and head coach Joe Krivak had high hopes for him heading into the season. In his first start as a senior, Zolak completed a school-record 28 passes in 46 attempts for 303 yards and two touchdowns, including a 51-yard pass to Gene Thomas with 61 seconds left that gave Maryland the win against Virginia Tech, 20–13. The following week, he once more featured in a dramatic conclusion, throwing a 59-yard touchdown pass to Gene Thomas with 2:27 left to beat 25th-ranked West Virginia, 14–10. However, he was struggling in other aspects of his game. In an October game against Georgia Tech, Zolak was sacked 10 times. In four games, he had been sacked 23 times and had 12 passes intercepted. By the end of the season, as Maryland was preparing to face Louisiana Tech in the 1990 Independence Bowl, he had thrown 225 completed passes in 418 attempts for 2,589 yards and 10 touchdowns. The teams tied, 34–34, in Zolak's final collegiate appearance. At the time of his graduation, he ranked fifth in school history with 270 pass completions, seventh with 3,124 career passing yards, and second with 2,589 passing yards in a season. He was also named Atlantic Coast Conference Offensive Player of the Week four times. Zolak remains the most recent quarterback drafted from Maryland.

==== Statistics ====
Year	Team	Passing								Rushing			
Year	Team	Cmp	Att	Pct	Yds	Y/A	TD	Int	Rtg	Att	Yds	Avg	TD
1988	Maryland	12	22	54.5	128	5.8	0	1	94.3	3	-17	-5.7	0
1989	Maryland	33	69	47.8	407	5.9	2	3	98.2	12	-35	-2.9	0
1990	Maryland	225	418	53.8	2,589	6.2	10	19	104.7	64	-197	-3.1	1
Career		270	509	53.0	3,124	6.1	12	23	103.3	79	-249	-3.2	1

== Professional career ==
=== New England Patriots ===
The New England Patriots selected Zolak with the 84th pick in the fourth round of the 1991 NFL draft. Scouting reports noted that his size and arm strength were great for the NFL, though there were concerns about his accuracy. Upon drafting him, Patriots Vice President of Player Operations Joe Mendes agreed that his size and arm would translate to the NFL, and he was not worried about any accuracy issues. His drafting led to a shakeup with the Patriots' current quarterbacks, as Marc Wilson announced his retirement and longtime starting quarterback Steve Grogan was released. Zolak agreed on a contract with the Patriots in July, and was the second-to-last person to hold out after Leonard Russell. Zolak spent the 1991 season as the third-string quarterback, behind Hugh Millen and Tommy Hodson, and did not take the field.

"It's a heck of an honor considering the other quarterbacks in the league and the other AFC offensive players that are in the AFC. I'm wowed by it right now. I couldn't have done it without the other 10 guys."

— Scott Zolak upon winning AFC player of the week honors, The Hartford Courant, November 19, 1992.

At the start of the 1992 season, Zolak also looked unlikely to appear, being behind Hodson and Millen on the depth chart. Millen started the first five games before being injured, and then Hodson became the starter. In early November, Zolak made his professional debut in the fourth quarter against the New Orleans Saints. Relieving Hodson, he completed five of nine passes and threw an interception as the Patriots lost, 31–14. The next week, Zolak made his first career start when the 0–9 Patriots faced the Indianapolis Colts. He completed 20 of 29 passes for 261 yards, two touchdowns, and an interception in the Patriots' first win of the season, 37–34. As a result of his performance, he was named the American Football Conference (AFC) Player of the Week. The next week, Zolak led his team to their second victory of the season against the New York Jets. He completed seven of 16 passes for 102 yards, getting help from Jon Vaughn who had 110 rushing yards, and the Patriots won, 24–3. However, the following week's performance against the Atlanta Falcons was less impressive. He completed nine of 16 passes for 58 yards and two interceptions in the Patriots' losing effort, and he said it felt like he was "on a desert island by myself." After Zolak's performance against Atlanta, he lost the starting job, and Millen again filled that role. However, Millen suffered a shoulder injury against the Colts, and after Zolak played part of the game against Indianapolis, he again became the starter for the game against the Kansas City Chiefs. Zolak injured his ankle at the end of the third quarter, making the appearance against Kansas City his last for the season as Jeff Carlson took over quarterbacking duties. Zolak finished the season with 52 pass completions in 100 attempts, 561 yards, two touchdowns, four interceptions, and a passer rating of 58.8.

In 1993, the Patriots and new head coach Bill Parcells were looking to improve the quarterback spot on their roster. They signed Scott Secules, and attempted to sign Steve Beuerlein, but the latter deal did not happen. They also gave Hugh Millen permission to seek a trade. In April, Millen was traded to the Dallas Cowboys, and the Patriots chose Drew Bledsoe with the first pick in the 1993 NFL draft. During the offseason, Carlson was released, leaving Secules, Zolak, Bledsoe, and Hodson to compete for the three spots on the roster. By the end of the preseason, Bledsoe had won the starting job and Hodson had been cut, with Secules as the backup and Zolak as the third-string quarterback. Zolak saw playing time in three games in 1993, and threw two incomplete passes. He became a restricted free agent in the offseason, but re-signed with the Patriots for three years. As Secules was released during the preseason, Zolak was set as Bledsoe's backup as the 1994 season began. As was the case in the 1993 season, he did not make a starting appearance, as Bledsoe played the full 16 games, however Zolak did see action in every game, primarily as the holder for extra point and field goal attempts. Over the course of the season, he completed five of eight passes for 28 yards in the two games in which he saw time at quarterback. The 1995 season was similar, with Bledsoe starting and Zolak backing him up. In September, Bledsoe separated his left shoulder in a game and sat out a week to heal, allowing Zolak to make his first start since 1992. On October 1, 1995, Zolak took the field against the Atlanta Falcons, and completed 24 of 45 passes for 252 yards and a touchdown, though the Patriots lost the game, 30–17. Although Bledsoe's doctors wanted him to sit out another week, he refused and played the next week's game against the Denver Broncos. This again relegated Zolak to the backup position, where he remained for the rest of the season. He finished the season with 28 completed passes in 49 attempts for 282 yards, a touchdown, and a quarterback rating of 80.5.

The 1996 season began well for Zolak, whose contract was extended through 1998. However, to remain with the Patriots, Zolak took a $250,000 pay cut to work around the salary cap. While he appeared set to keep his backup job heading into training camp, he faced tough competition from Jay Barker. While Zolak welcomed the challenge, his status as the backup quarterback began to seem uncertain a few weeks into training camp. By the end of training camp, Barker had been cut, and Zolak's quarterback job was safe. He took the role of emergency quarterback throughout the 1996 season, with Bledsoe taking nearly all the snaps and Tom Tupa serving as the backup upon his signing. Zolak played in three games, completing one pass for five yards. He saw some playing time in the playoffs against the Pittsburgh Steelers, but did not play in Super Bowl XXXI. Parcells ordered Zolak to lose weight, which Zolak did throughout much of the season. The 1997 season was more of the same for Zolak, backing up Bledsoe, though the Patriots did have a new coach in Pete Carroll. As training camp ended, Zolak gained significantly more playing time during drills and the preseason matchups than he had under Parcells. As the regular season came and went, however, he had minimal playing time. Zolak saw action in four games, completing six of nine passes for 67 yards and two touchdowns, giving him a quarterback rating of 128.2.

With Zolak coming to the final year of his contract in 1998, he sat in his usual spot on the depth chart, in between starter Bledsoe and third stringer Tupa. He saw playing time in three games during the first three months of the season in relief of Bledsoe. His most significant appearance during this time came against the Atlanta Falcons on November 8, 1998, where he completed three of ten passes for 33 yards and an interception in a 41–10 loss. Near the end of the month, Bledsoe was sidelined with an injury and was questionable for the final November game. Bledsoe played in three more games, but his injury kept him from playing in the final two, giving Zolak his first starting appearance since 1995. Zolak's first start came against the San Francisco 49ers on December 20. He completed 14 of 30 passes for 205 yards, two touchdowns and two interceptions, and won the game, 24–21. He faced the New York Jets the following week, completing 14 of 31 passes for 127 yards and a touchdown, but lost the game 31–10. Zolak finished the season with his most productive totals since 1992. He played in six games and started two, completed 32 of 75 passes for 371 yards, three touchdowns, three interceptions, and had a passer rating of 61.8. Zolak's last appearance for the Patriots occurred in the playoffs, as Bledsoe was still injured, against the Jacksonville Jaguars. He completed 21 of 44 passes as the Jaguars eliminated the Patriots from playoff contention in a 25–10 loss. He became an unrestricted free agent after the season ended, but was not asked back by the Patriots, ending his tenure there.

=== New York Jets and Miami Dolphins ===
After leaving the Patriots, Zolak was signed to a one-year contract by the New York Jets. With Vinny Testaverde considered the starter, Zolak was competing against Ray Lucas for a backup job. He was the second-string quarterback as training camp began, but his competition increased when the Jets signed Rick Mirer and left three quarterbacks to battle for two open spots on the team. Two days after acquiring Mirer from the Green Bay Packers, the Jets released Zolak. In October, Zolak was signed to a one-year deal by the Miami Dolphins to serve as the backup quarterback behind Damon Huard and Jim Druckenmiller. He was later made the backup behind Huard, and made his only appearance of the season on November 21, failing to complete a pass in four attempts against the Patriots. As the 1999 season wrapped up, the Dolphins signed Zolak to a contract extension, keeping him on the team for another year. Despite the retirement of Dan Marino, the Dolphins cut Zolak in May 2000. Zolak trained for the Detroit Lions during the summer after they lost Mike Tomczak for the season, but instead he signed on as a host for Patriots Gameday alongside Bob Lobel in August, ending his professional football career.

== NFL career statistics ==
=== Regular season ===
Year	Team	Games			Passing								Rushing			
Year	Team	GP	GS	Record	Cmp	Att	Pct	Yds	Y/A	TD	Int	Rtg	Att	Yds	Avg	TD
1991	NE	0	0	—	DNP											
1992	NE	6	4	2–2	52	100	52.0	561	5.6	2	4	58.8	18	71	3.9	0
1993	NE	3	0	—	0	2	0.0	0	0.0	0	0	39.6	1	0	0.0	0
1994	NE	16	0	—	5	8	62.5	28	3.5	0	0	68.8	1	-1	-1.0	0
1995	NE	16	1	0–1	28	49	57.1	282	5.8	1	0	80.5	4	19	4.8	0
1996	NE	3	0	—	1	1	100.0	5	5.0	0	0	87.5	4	-3	-0.8	0
1997	NE	4	0	—	6	9	66.7	67	7.4	2	0	128.2	3	-3	-1.0	0
1998	NE	6	2	1–1	32	75	42.7	371	4.9	3	3	54.9	5	0	0.0	0
1999	MIA	1	0	—	0	4	0.0	0	0.0	0	0	39.6	2	-2	-1.0	0
Career		55	7	3–4	124	248	50.0	1,314	5.3	8	7	64.8	38	81	2.1	0

=== Playoffs ===
Year	Team	Games			Passing								Rushing				Sacks		Fumbles	
Year	Team	GP	GS	Record	Cmp	Att	Pct	Yds	Avg	TD	Int	Rtg	Att	Yds	Avg	TD	Sck	SckY	Fum	Lost
1994	NE	1	0	–	0	0	0.0	0	0.0	0	0	0.0	0	0	0.0	0	0	0	0	0
1996	NE	1	0	–	1	2	50.0	3	1.5	0	0	56.2	3	-4	-1.3	0	0	0	0	0
1998	NE	1	1	0–1	21	44	47.7	190	4.3	0	1	50.4	0	0	0.0	0	2	19	1	0
Career		3	1	0–1	22	46	47.8	193	4.2	0	1	50.4	3	-4	-1.3	0	2	19	1	0

== Post-NFL career ==
After retirement, Zolak became a co-host of a morning sports radio talk show on Rhode Island sportstalk station "The Score" (WSKO/790 & WSKO-FM/99.7) until the show was canceled in 2008. He was also a football analyst for the CBS College Sports Network, as well as on the New England sports program Out of Bounds on the Comcast channel hosted by Gregg Murphy. In addition, Scott was a frequent guest host on The Big Show on WEEI in Boston before joining Gary Tanguay for the midday slot on "The Sports Hub" 98.5 FM WBZ-FM, which covers the Boston area.

For the 2008 NFL season, Zolak joined WCVB-TV (ABC Boston) as the station's Patriots analyst, and also appeared on "SportsCenter 5 OT" on Sundays with Mike Lynch. The previous year, he had worked with Lynch covering high school games. In September 2010, the United Football League announced that Zolak would do color commentary during live games on the New England Sports Network. Zolak also contributes to "Patriots All Access", part of the New England Patriots' website. On August 8, 2012, Zolak was named the new color analyst for Patriots radio broadcasts, joining Gil Santos and replacing Gino Cappelletti. Prior to the 2013 NFL season, Santos retired and was replaced by Bob Socci. From 2018 to 2023, Zolak and Socci called Patriots preseason games on WBZ-TV. For the 2024 and 2025 preseasons, Zolak was part of a three-person booth with Devin and Jason McCourty, with no traditional play-by-play broadcaster.

In 2017 Zolak was awarded the short-lived The Globies' Voice of Boston Award by The Boston Globe for his work on Patriots games and his radio show.

During a game versus the New Orleans Saints on October 13, 2013, Zolak's unbridled reaction to a comeback game-winning Patriots touchdown pass from Tom Brady to Kenbrell Thompkins alongside play-by-play announcer and broadcast partner Socci went viral. He and Socci were the Patriots' radio broadcasting team for the team's fourth, fifth, and sixth Super Bowl wins in Super Bowl XLIX, Super Bowl LI and Super Bowl LIII.

=== Zolak and Bertrand ===
On February 12, 2015, The Sports Hub announced that Zolak would team with Marc Bertrand as the co-host of a new show, Zolak and Bertrand, with a premiere scheduled for Tuesday, February 17. Bertrand had joined the station in 2009 and had previously worked as the sports headline anchor for the Felger & Mazz show. "I'm beyond thrilled to be moving to middays to work with Scott Zolak," said Bertrand. As of January 2026, the show airs weekdays from 10:00 a.m. to 2:00 p.m.

Prior to the announcement, Zolak had shared the midday time slot with Andy Gresh since 2010. Gresh's contract had recently expired, and despite rumors that he would be moving to a new company, the station said that Gresh would remain at 98.5 in a variety of roles. The new lineup came despite the Gresh and Zo program having exceptional ratings driven by the Patriots' run to the Super Bowl XLIX title. Prior to the announcement, the program had earned a 17.4 share. The show is also simulcast on NBC Sports Boston.

Rob "Hardy" Poole held the third microphone position on the Zolak and Bertrand show for a number of years. Poole had been with The Sports Hub since the station's inception in 2009. In December 2023, the station announced that Hardy would join The Toucher and Rich Show on January 4, 2024, replacing Rich Shertenleib who had left the program in October 2023.

Following the announcement of Poole's departure, Zolak expressed his appreciation of "Hardy's" work on the program. Tim McKone since has taken over Hardy's position. The show had recently received 14.6 ratings share, according to data from Nielsen Media Research.

== Personal life ==
Zolak resides in Massachusetts with his wife Amy and his three children (Hadley, Samantha, and Brody). His daughter, Samantha, was diagnosed with Type 1 diabetes, and Zolak has since been investigating causes of the disease. Zolak's son Brody currently plays quarterback for King Philip Regional High School.
