= Ringgold High School (Pennsylvania) =

High school in Pennsylvania, United States

Coordinates: 40.2001°N 79.9789°W

- Monongahela, Washington, Pennsylvania 15063; United States

Information
- School type: Public, coeducation high school
- School district: Ringgold School District
- Teaching staff: 57.50 (FTE)
- Grades: 9-12
- Enrollment: 832 (2023-2024)
- Student to teacher ratio: 14.47
- Colors: Blue and gold
- Athletics conference: Western Pennsylvania Interscholastic Athletics League
- Mascot: Rams
- Team name: Ringgold Rams

Ringgold High School, part of the Ringgold School District, is a public high school in Carroll Township, Washington County, Pennsylvania, which is about thirty miles south of Pittsburgh. The Ringgold School District was formed as a result of the merger of the Donora and Monongahela School Districts.

== Athletics ==
Ringgold High School has sixteen varsity sports teams and competes as The Ringgold Rams in the Western Pennsylvania Interscholastic Athletic League.

RHS Sports Listed by Season
| Fall | Winter | Spring |
|---|---|---|
| Cross Country (Boys and Girls) | Basketball (Boys and Girls) | Baseball |
| Football | Competitive Spirit | Softball |
| Golf | Hockey (Boys) | Tennis (Boys) |
| Soccer (Boys and Girls) | Indoor Track (Boys and Girls) | Track (Boys and Girls) |
| Tennis (Girls) | Swimming (Boys and Girls) | |
| Volleyball | Wrestling | |

=== State Championship Titles ===
Ringgold currently holds three state championship titles. The first PIAA Class 4A title was won by the 1994-5 Ringgold Boys Basketball team. The basketball team beat Williamsport in a 71-66 game. The second was won by the 2018 Ringgold Boys Baseball team. The 2018 Rams beat their opponent, Valley View, in a 6-4 win. Ringgold's third state championship title was claimed in Class AA girls diving by Anna Vogt in March 2019.

== Notable alumni ==
- Fred Cox (1938-2019), former NFL kicker, (attended Monongahela High School before merger)
- Ken Griffey Sr. (born 1950), former MLB outfielder and coach, (attended Donora High School before merger)
- Joe Montana (born 1956), former NFL quarterback, member of Pro Football Hall of Fame
- Stan Musial (1920-2013), former MLB outfielder and pitcher, (attended Donora High School before merger)
- Anthony Peterson (born 1972), former NFL linebacker
- Jim Renacci (born 1958), member of the US House of Representatives
- Scott Zolak (born 1967), broadcaster and former NFL quarterback
