= Bob Lobel =

American sportscaster

Robert Lobel (born December 24, 1943) is a former sportscaster for WBZ-TV in Boston, Massachusetts. He anchored the sports segments on the evening newscasts between Sunday and Thursday, and hosted the weekly programs Sports Final and Patriots 5th Quarter. During a round of layoffs in April 2008, Lobel's contract was bought out by the station. Golf Digest called him an "iconic sportscaster" with "an impressive resume" that includes having served as a news anchor, NFL and NBA announcer, NCAA Tournament sideline reporter and Fenway Park public announcer.

== Early life and career ==
Lobel was born in Apple Creek, Ohio. He earned a bachelor's degree from Kent State University and a master's degree from the University of Vermont. In 1969, he was hired as a sportscaster by WVNY in Burlington, Vermont despite no previous experience or education in broadcasting. After his wife became pregnant, Lobel took a higher paying job at WJOY. In 1972, he joined WGIR in Manchester, New Hampshire, where he hosted a nightly call-in show and called high school sports, Saint Anselm and Dartmouth hockey, and American Legion baseball. Lobel's show gained a following on Massachusetts' North Shore, where he became an alternative to WBZ's Guy Mainella. In October 1976, Lobel joined WBZ, where he succeeded Ken Beatrice as host of the 10 pm to midnight program, Calling All Sports. In February 1977 he was given the additional assignments of drive-time sports reporter and color commentator for Boston Celtics and Boston Bruins home games. In March 1977, Calling All Sports was moved to weekends with Upton Bell as a co-host. During the 1977 NBA Playoffs, Lobel filled in for Boston Celtics play by play announcer Johnny Most.

== WBZ-TV ==
Lobel joined WBZ-TV as weekend sports anchor in 1979 and was promoted to weekday anchor and sports director in 1981. Lobel has also done some play-by-play work, calling WBZ's annual broadcast of the Boston Marathon, Boston Celtics games from 1989 to 1993, Boston College Eagles football games in 1986, New England Patriots preseason games from 1985 to 1991, and two NFL games for NBC in 1985. He was a sideline reporter for the NCAA men's basketball tournament between 1995 and 1997.

On the air, Lobel was known for using props and catchphrases during his sportscasts:

- "Why can't we get players like that?" – when any former player for a Boston team is shown making a big play for his new team. This is emphasized in instances when the former Boston player burns a Boston team.
- the "Panic Button" when a local team is on a losing streak
- a support beam from the Boston Garden occasionally used for Boston Bruins and Boston Celtics highlights.

Lobel is also known for his local charity work for Children's Hospital and The Genesis Fund among many others.

During a 2003 edition of Sports Final, Boston Globe columnist Bob Ryan said that the wife of New Jersey Nets guard Jason Kidd needed someone to "smack" her for taking his young children to NBA playoff games where they could be taunted. Kidd had recently faced charges of domestic violence. Lobel immediately interrupted Ryan and tried to get Ryan to retract his comment, but Ryan refused. The Globe suspended Ryan for three weeks. In an Internet chat that summer, Lobel said that his actions were not "an act of heroism on my part, just knowing what is acceptable and what is not acceptable".

On April 2, 2008, it was announced that Lobel would be released from WBZ-TV after almost thirty years with the station. On December 1, 2010, Lobel started doing a new radio show on WTPL-FM 107.7 in New Hampshire. The show ran till 2014.

On February 3, 2009, Bob Lobel returned briefly to the WBZ fold, on WBZ 1030 AM, replacing Gil Santos (longtime sportscaster who retired on January 30) as the on-air sports reporter. He continues to work with the radio station in other capacities, including golf reports on weekends.

== WODS-FM and WAMG-AM ==
In September 2008, Lobel was hired as a co-host on a morning talk show on WODS-FM, "Oldies 103.3". The show, co-hosted by Karen Blake, will feature cover a range of topics including sports. Due to back surgery in October 2008, Lobel was replaced on WODS on November 11, 2008.

Lobel appeared on The Boston Sports Show on Boston's ESPN Radio affiliate, WAMG-890, until it was cancelled in September 2009.

== Fenway Park ==
In 2013, Lobel was one of three men chosen to serve as Fenway Park's public address announcer. He will announce most of the Boston Red Sox's Saturday games.

== MeTV ==
Lobel and ex-wife Susan Wornick "are pairing up to serve as the "faces" of MeTV Boston, WCVB's digital channel 5.2, announced Bill Fine, WCVB President and General Manager." This was announced May 29, 2014.

== Discrimination suit; legal issues ==
Lobel, who has spinal stenosis and must use crutches as a result, filed a discrimination suit in United States district court in Boston in November 2015, after Woodland Golf Club in Newton, Massachusetts, barred him from taking his cart onto its putting greens in 2014. Lobel was "demanding $250,000 in compensation for violating the Americans with Disabilities Act and the Massachusetts Civil Rights Act and to be permitted to use the course with a specialized cart." Woodland is reported to have responded, "The golf cart caused significant impressions and tears on the greens during the test." In March 2016, three of four counts in the lawsuit (including the demand for $250,000) were dismissed.

In 2005, Lobel filed a libel suit against Darby Conley (creator of the comic strip Get Fuzzy), United Feature Syndicate, and The Standard-Times of New Bedford, Massachusetts, for implying and asserting that Lobel was intoxicated while on air; the lawsuit was settled out-of-court in November 2005.

Preceded by Dan Davis	Boston College Eagles football Play by Play; 1986	Succeeded by Gil Santos
