= Bob Socci =

American TV and radio sports broadcaster (born 1967)

- Born: 1967 (age 58–59); Auburn, New York, U.S.
- Education: University of Dayton (1989)
- Occupation: Sports broadcaster
- Years active: 1989–present
- Spouse: Monique Tello
- Children: 2
- Awards: Massachusetts Sportscaster of the Year 2021
- Website: bobsocci.com

Bob Socci /ˌsoʊsiː/ (born 1967) is an American TV and radio sports broadcaster. He is currently the radio play-by-play voice of the NFL's New England Patriots.

== Early life and education ==
Socci was born in Auburn, New York. He is a 1985 graduate of Auburn High School, where he was a member of the school's 1985 New York state championship baseball team.

Socci is a 1989 graduate of the University of Dayton.

== Sports broadcasting career ==
Socci was hired as the new play-by-play voice of the New England Patriots in April 2013, replacing Gil Santos, who retired after 36 years with the team. Socci is partnered with Scott Zolak on Patriots broadcasts.

Since joining the Patriots broadcast, Socci and Zolak have called three Super Bowl Championships. In February 2015 the Patriots won the franchises fourth Super Bowl defeating the Seattle Seahawks when rookie cornerback Malcolm Butler intercepted a pass at the goal line sealing the title. In February 2017 the duo called "The Greatest Comeback in Super Bowl History" when the Patriots rallied from a 28–3 third quarter deficit to beat the Atlanta Falcons 34–28 in the first overtime game in 51 years of the Super Bowl. He was named Massachusetts Sportscaster of the Year 2021.

Before joining the Patriots, Socci's previous broadcasting experience included 15 seasons as the play-by-play voice of Navy Midshipmen football (1998–2012), 11 seasons as the voice of Navy basketball (1997–2008), and a decade of calling Patriot League basketball games for networks including CSTV, ESPNU, and CBS Sports Network.

Socci also has over two decades of experience as a minor league baseball radio play-by-play announcer, calling games for the Pawtucket Red Sox (2013), Norfolk Tides (2006–2011), Albuquerque Isotopes (2003–2005), Frederick Keys (1999–2001), Delmarva Shorebirds (1996–1998), Peoria Chiefs (1993–1995), and Rochester Red Wings (1991–1992).

== Personal life ==
Socci lives in Milton, Massachusetts, with his wife, Monique Tello, their two children, and Dog Obi.

Preceded by Gil Santos	New England Patriots Play by Play announcer 2013–present	Succeeded by TBD
Preceded by ??	Navy Midshipmen (Football) Play by Play announcer 1997–2012	Succeeded by Pete Medhurst
Preceded by Aaron Goldsmith	Pawtucket Red Sox Play by Play announcer 2013	Succeeded by Josh Maurer
