= John Carlson (sportscaster) =

American soldier and sportscaster (1933–2016)

Brig.-Gen. John Warren Carlson (December 17, 1933 – April 5, 2016) was an American military officer and sportscaster.

Carlson called New England Patriots games from 1980 to 1986, New England Whalers from 1972 to 1975, Boston College Eagles football and Basketball on TV and Radio from 1987 to 1989, and Minnesota Vikings games in 1990. Carlson was a sports talk show host at WEEI radio in Boston from 1976 to 1987 and at WRKO 1987–1990.

He died on April 5, 2016, at the age of 82 due to respiratory complications.
