= Dennis Eckersley =

American baseball player (born 1954)

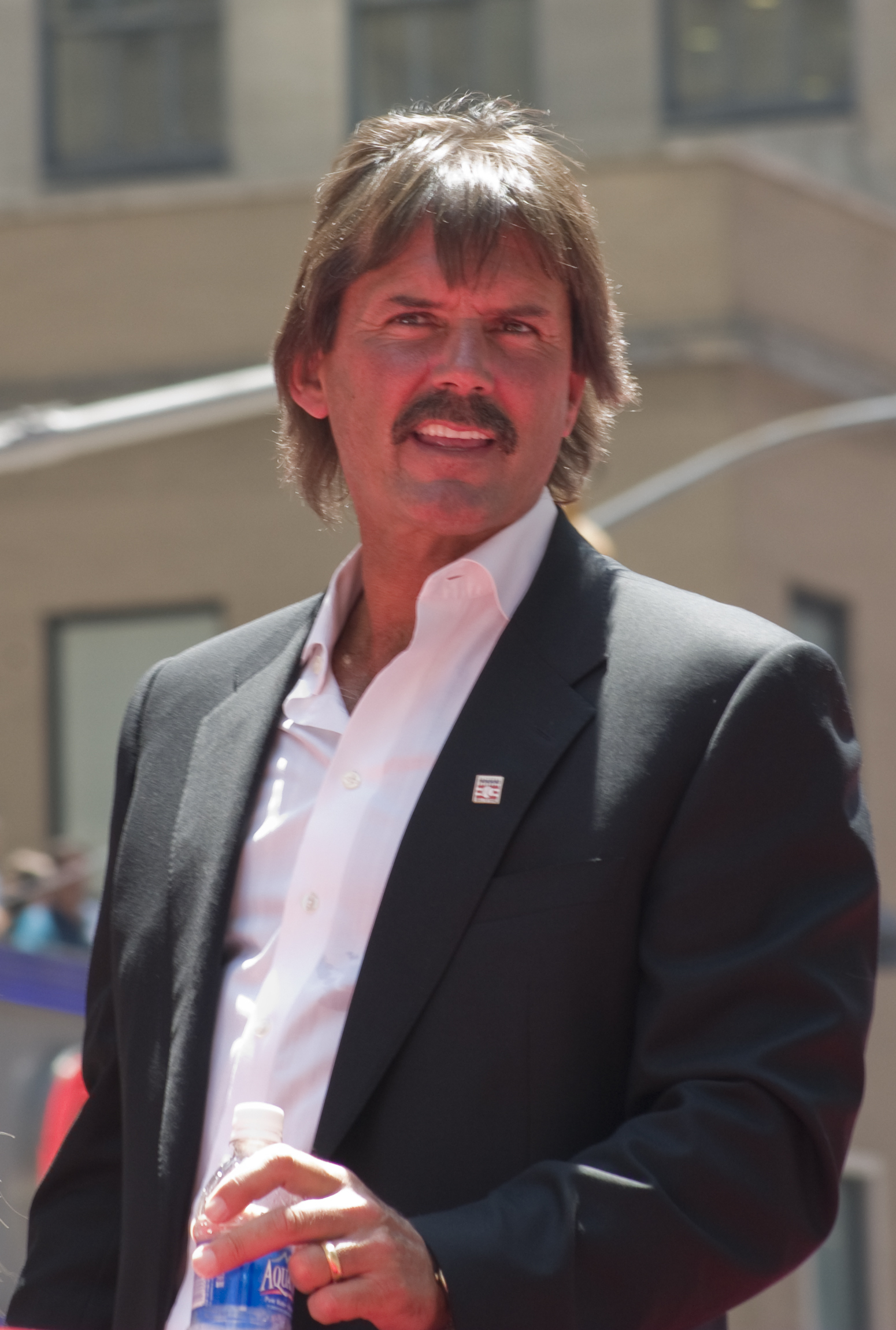
- Eckersley in 2008
- Pitcher
- Born: October 3, 1954 (age 72); Oakland, California, U.S.
- Batted: Right Threw: Right

MLB debut
- April 12, 1975, for the Cleveland Indians

Last MLB appearance
- September 26, 1998, for the Boston Red Sox

MLB statistics
- Win–loss record: 197–171
- Earned run average: 3.50
- Strikeouts: 2,401
- Saves: 390
- Stats at Baseball Reference

Teams
- Cleveland Indians (1975–1977); Boston Red Sox (1978–1984); Chicago Cubs (1984–1986); Oakland Athletics (1987–1995); St. Louis Cardinals (1996–1997); Boston Red Sox (1998)

Career highlights and awards
- 6× All-Star (1977, 1982, 1988, 1990–1992); World Series champion (1989); AL MVP (1992); AL Cy Young Award (1992); ALCS MVP (1988); 2× AL Rolaids Relief Man Award (1988, 1992); 2× MLB saves leader (1988, 1992); Pitched a no-hitter on May 30, 1977; Athletics No. 43 retired; Boston Red Sox Hall of Fame; Athletics Hall of Fame; Major League Baseball All-Time Team

Member of the National

Baseball Hall of Fame
- Induction: 2004
- Vote: 83.2% (first ballot)

Dennis Lee Eckersley (born October 3, 1954), nicknamed "Eck", is an American former professional baseball pitcher and color commentator. Between 1975 and 1998, he pitched in Major League Baseball (MLB) for the Cleveland Indians, Boston Red Sox, Chicago Cubs, Oakland Athletics, and St. Louis Cardinals. Eckersley had success as a starter, but gained his greatest fame as a closer, becoming the first of two pitchers in major league history to have both a 20-win season and a 50-save season in a career.

Eckersley was elected to the Baseball Hall of Fame in 2004 in his first year of eligibility. He previously worked with NESN as a part-time color commentator for Red Sox broadcasts, and has also worked for Turner Sports as a game analyst for their Sunday MLB Games and MLB postseason coverage on TBS. He retired from NESN in 2022.

== Early life ==
Eckersley grew up in Fremont, California, rooting for both the San Francisco Giants and the Oakland Athletics of Major League Baseball (MLB). Two of his boyhood heroes were the Giants' Willie Mays and Juan Marichal, and he later adopted Marichal's high leg kick pitching delivery.

Eckersley attended Washington High School in Fremont. He played for the football team as a quarterback until his senior year, when he gave up football to protect his throwing arm from injury. He won 29 games as a pitcher at Washington, throwing a 90-mile-per-hour (140 km/h) fastball and a screwball.

== Baseball career ==
=== Cleveland Indians (1975–1977) ===
The Cleveland Indians selected Eckersley in the third round of the 1972 MLB draft; he was disappointed that he was not drafted by the Giants. He made his major league debut on April 12, 1975. He was The Sporting News American League Rookie Pitcher of the Year in 1975, compiling a 13–7 win–loss record and 2.60 earned run average (ERA). His unstyled long hair, moustache, and live fastball made him an instant and identifiable fan favorite. Eckersley pitched reliably over three seasons with the Indians.

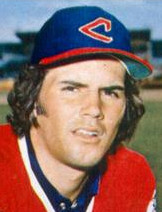
Eckersley with the Indians

On May 30, 1977, Eckersley threw a no-hitter against the California Angels at Cleveland Stadium. He struck out 12 batters and only allowed two to reach base, Tony Solaita on a walk in the first inning and Bobby Bonds on a third strike that was a wild pitch. He earned his first All-Star Game selection that year and finished the season with a 14–13 win–loss record.

=== Boston Red Sox (1978–1984) ===
The Indians traded Eckersley and Fred Kendall to the Boston Red Sox for Rick Wise, Mike Paxton, Bo Díaz, and Ted Cox on March 30, 1978. Over the next two seasons, Eckersley won a career-high 20 games in 1978 and 17 games in 1979, with a 2.99 ERA in each year. However, during the remainder of his tenure with Boston, from 1980 to 1984, Eckersley pitched poorly. His fastball had lost some steam, as demonstrated by his 43–48 record with Boston. He later developed a very effective slider.

=== Chicago Cubs (1984–1986) ===
On May 25, 1984, the Red Sox traded Eckersley with Mike Brumley to the Chicago Cubs for Bill Buckner, one of several mid-season deals that helped the Cubs to their first postseason appearance since 1945. Eckersley won 10 games and lost 8, with a 3.03 ERA.

Eckersley remained with the Cubs in 1985, when he posted an 11–7 record with the final two shutouts of his career. His performance deteriorated in 1986, when he posted a 6–11 record with a 4.57 ERA. After the season, he checked himself into a rehabilitation clinic to treat alcoholism. Eckersley later said that he realized the problem he had after family members videotaped him while drunk and played the tape back for him the next day. During his Hall of Fame speech he recalled that time in his life, saying "I was spiraling out of control personally. I knew I had come to a crossroads in my life. With the grace of God, I got sober and I saved my life."

=== Oakland Athletics (1987–1995) ===
Eckersley was traded again on April 3, 1987 to the Oakland Athletics, where manager Tony La Russa intended to use him as a setup pitcher or long reliever. Indeed, Eckersley started two games with the A's before an injury to then-closer Jay Howell opened the door for Eckersley to move into the closer's role. He saved 16 games in 1987 and then established himself as a dominant closer in 1988 by recording a league-leading 45 saves. Eckersley recorded 4 saves against the Red Sox in the regular season, and he dominated once more by recording saves in all four games as the A's swept the Red Sox in the 1988 ALCS. (which was matched by Greg Holland in the 2014 ALCS), but he found himself on the wrong end of Kirk Gibson's 1988 World Series home run (Eckersley himself first coined the phrase "walk-off home run" to describe that moment) as the A's lost to the Dodgers in 5 games.

In the 1989 World Series he secured the victory in Game Two, and then earned the save in the final game of the Series, as the A's swept the San Francisco Giants in four games.

Eckersley was the most dominant closer in the game from 1988 to 1992, finishing first in the A.L. in saves twice, second two other times, and third once. He saved 220 games during the five years and never posted an ERA higher than 2.96. He gave up five earned runs in the entire 1990 season, resulting in a 0.61 ERA. Eckersley's control, which had always been above average even when he was not otherwise pitching well, became his trademark; he walked only three batters in 57.2 innings in 1989, four batters in 73.1 innings in 1990, and nine batters in 76 innings in 1991. Between August 7, 1989, and June 10, 1990, Eckersley appeared in 41 games without walking a single batter, setting a record which still stands as of 2020 and surpassing the previous mark set by Lew Burdette 23 years earlier. In his 1990 season, Eckersley became the first relief pitcher in baseball history to have more saves than baserunners allowed (48 saves, 41 hits, 4 walks, 0 hit by pitch). He had the same walks plus hits per inning pitched and ERA (rounded to three decimal places): both were 0.614.

Eckersley was the American League's Most Valuable Player and Cy Young Award winner in 1992, a season in which he posted 51 saves. Only two other relievers have accomplished the double feat: Rollie Fingers in 1981 and Willie Hernández in 1984. In the American League Championship Series against the Toronto Blue Jays, during Game 4 in what some considered the turning point in the series that the Jays won, Eckersley gave up a game-tying 2-run home run to Roberto Alomar, and his team eventually lost 7–6 in 11 innings.

Eckersley's numbers slipped following 1992: although he still was among the league leaders in saves, his ERA climbed sharply, and his number of saves never exceeded 36.

On September 16, 1993, in a game against the Minnesota Twins, Eckersley allowed Dave Winfield's 3,000th career hit.

After the 1994 season, the Athletics elected not to exercise a $4 million option on Eckersley, making him a free agent. The team indicated that it would be interested in signing him at a lower salary. Oakland signed him to a one-year contract in early April 1995. His contract was the first major league deal after a three-month signing ban resulting from a labor dispute between owners and the players union.

=== St. Louis Cardinals (1996–1997) ===
Eckersley was traded to the St. Louis Cardinals in February 1996, following his manager La Russa who also left for St. Louis that offseason. Eckersley continued in his role as closer and remained one of the league's best, with 66 saves in two seasons in St. Louis.

=== Boston Red Sox (second stint) (1998) ===
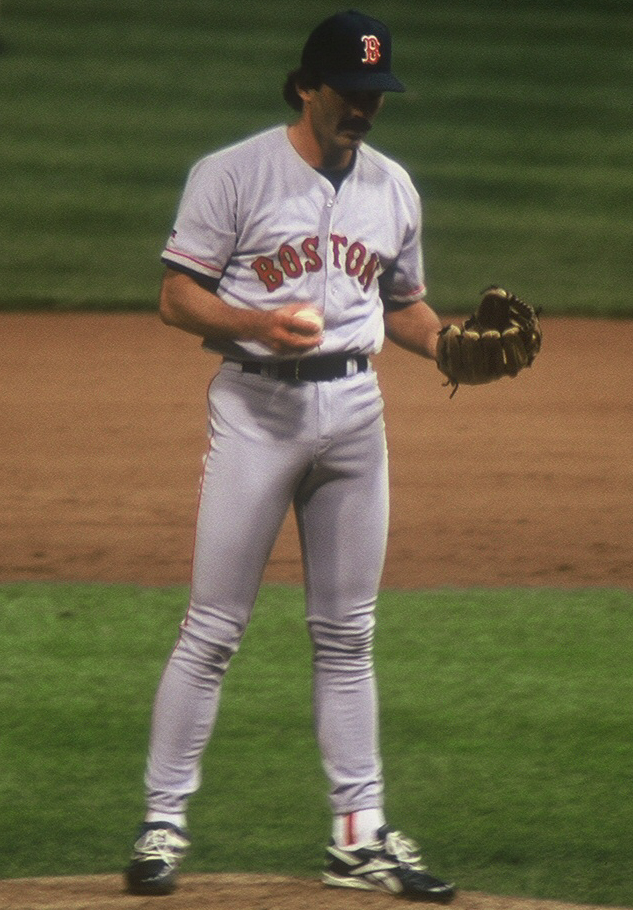
Eckersley with the Red Sox at Tiger Stadium in 1998

Following the 1997 season, he signed with the Red Sox for a final season, serving as a setup man for Tom Gordon, as Boston qualified for the AL playoffs.

Eckersley announced his retirement in December 1998. He commented on his career, saying, "I had a good run. I had some magic that was with me for a long time, so I know that I was real lucky to not have my arm fall off for one thing, and to make it this long physically is tough enough. But to me it's like you're being rescued too when your career's over. It's like, 'Whew, the pressure's off'."

=== Career statistics ===
W	L	PCT	ERA	G	GS	CG	SHO	SV	IP	H	ER	R	HR	BB	SO	WP	HBP
197	171	.535	3.50	1071	361	100	20	390	3285.2	3076	1278	1382	347	738	2401	75	28

Eckersley retired with a career 197–171 record, a 3.50 ERA, and 390 saves. As of the end of the 2024 season, he ranks ninth on the all-time saves list. When he retired, Eckersley had appeared in more games (1,071) than any other pitcher in major league history, though he ranks fifth all-time through the end of 2024.

== Pitching style ==
Eckersley's unusual delivery utilized a high leg kick along with a long, pronounced sidearm throwing motion. He had pinpoint accuracy: fellow Hall of Famer Goose Gossage said of him, "He could hit a gnat in the butt with a pitch if he wanted to.” Eckersley was aggressive and animated on the mound, and he was known for his intimidating stare and pumping his fist after a strikeout. As a starter, Eckersley threw four pitches, but as a reliever he narrowed his repertoire to two pitches: a sinker and a backdoor slider.

== Post-playing career ==
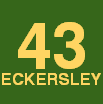
Dennis Eckersley's number 43 was retired by the Oakland Athletics in 2005.

In 1999, he ranked Number 98 on The Sporting News' list of the 100 Greatest Baseball Players. He was named to the Major League Baseball All-Century Team. On January 6, 2004, he was elected to the Baseball Hall of Fame in his first year of eligibility, with 83.2% of the votes. On August 13, 2005, Eckersley's uniform number (43) was officially retired by the Oakland Athletics. The baseball field at his alma mater, Washington High School, has been named in his honor.

In 2017, Eckersley rejoined the Athletics as the special assistant team president Dave Kaval.

=== Broadcasting ===
Eckersley began working as a studio analyst and color commentator for the Boston Red Sox on NESN in 2002. "Eck" became known for his easy-going manner and his own baseball vernacular, with Red Sox Nation attempting to keep up via "The Ecktionary," a defining list of his on-air sayings.

In the spring of 2009, when regular NESN commentator Jerry Remy took time off for health reasons, Eckersley filled in for him, providing color commentary alongside play-by-play announcer Don Orsillo. Eckersley was the primary substitute for Remy when he was unavailable, including filling in for the final two months of the 2013 season, when Remy took extended time off due to the murder indictment of his son, Jared. Eckersley continued to work with Orsillo's successor, Dave O'Brien, for various Red Sox games, and often worked with Remy and O'Brien in a three-man booth prior to Remy's death in 2021.

Eckersley also worked with TBS as a studio analyst from 2008 to 2012. In 2013, Eckersley moved to the booth with TBS, calling Sunday games for the network and also providing postseason analysis from the booth. In the 2017 postseason, he worked with Brian Anderson, Joe Simpson, and Lauren Shehadi.

Eckersley announced his retirement from NESN on August 8, 2022. In a statement released by NESN, he said:

After 50 years in Major League Baseball, I am excited about this next chapter of my life. I will continue to be an ambassador for the club and a proud member of Red Sox Nation while transitioning to life after baseball alongside my wife Jennifer, my children and my grandchildren. I'm forever grateful to NESN, the Red Sox, my family and the fans for supporting me throughout my career and through this decision and I look forward to remaining engaged with the team in a variety of capacities for years to come.

During an interview with The Boston Globe, Eckersley said, "I've been thinking about this for a long time. Not that it matters, but it's kind of a round number, leaving. I started in pro ball in '72, when I was a 17-year-old kid right out of high school. Fifty years ago ... So it's time." Following his announcement, Sean McGrail, NESN president and CEO said that NESN was "...fortunate that Dennis has been a part of our Red Sox coverage ... His unbridled passion, nuanced insights and Eck humor will be dearly missed and we are thankful for his many contributions to NESN. We wish him the best as he embarks on this next chapter of his life as a grandfather, father, husband and member of Red Sox Nation." Eckersley's final Red Sox broadcast as a NESN commentator was October 5, 2022.

Eckersley was inducted into the Massachusetts Broadcasters Hall of Fame in June 2025.

== Personal life ==
Eckersley married his first wife Denise in 1973 and they had a daughter, Mandee. Denise left him for Rick Manning, his then-Cleveland Indians teammate, in 1978; the affair precipitated Eckersley's trade to the Red Sox that year. Two years later, Eckersley married model Nancy O'Neil. They adopted two children, Jake and Alexandra. Eckersley and O'Neil divorced shortly after his retirement from baseball. His third wife, Jennifer, is a former lobbyist and manages Eckersley's business and charitable affairs.

During the first half of his career, Eckersley had problems with alcohol; he became sober in January 1987.

An MLB Network documentary about Eckersley, titled Eck: A Story of Saving, premiered on December 13, 2018.

In December 2022, Eckersley's adopted daughter Alexandra was arrested on suspicion of abandoning her newborn in a wooded area in 18 degree weather and misleading authorities as to the infant's whereabouts. Alexandra had been homeless since 2018 and suffering from addiction and mental health issues. In October 2024, Alexandra was given an 18 month suspended sentence, contingent on continued attention for mental health treatment.

== See also ==
- Bay Area Sports Hall of Fame
- List of Major League Baseball annual saves leaders
- List of Major League Baseball career strikeout leaders
- List of Major League Baseball career saves leaders
- List of Major League Baseball no-hitters

Preceded by Jim Colborn	No-hitter pitcher May 30, 1977	Succeeded by Bert Blyleven
