= Shirley Center Historic District =

Historic district in Massachusetts, United States

- U.S. National Register of Historic Places
- U.S. Historic district
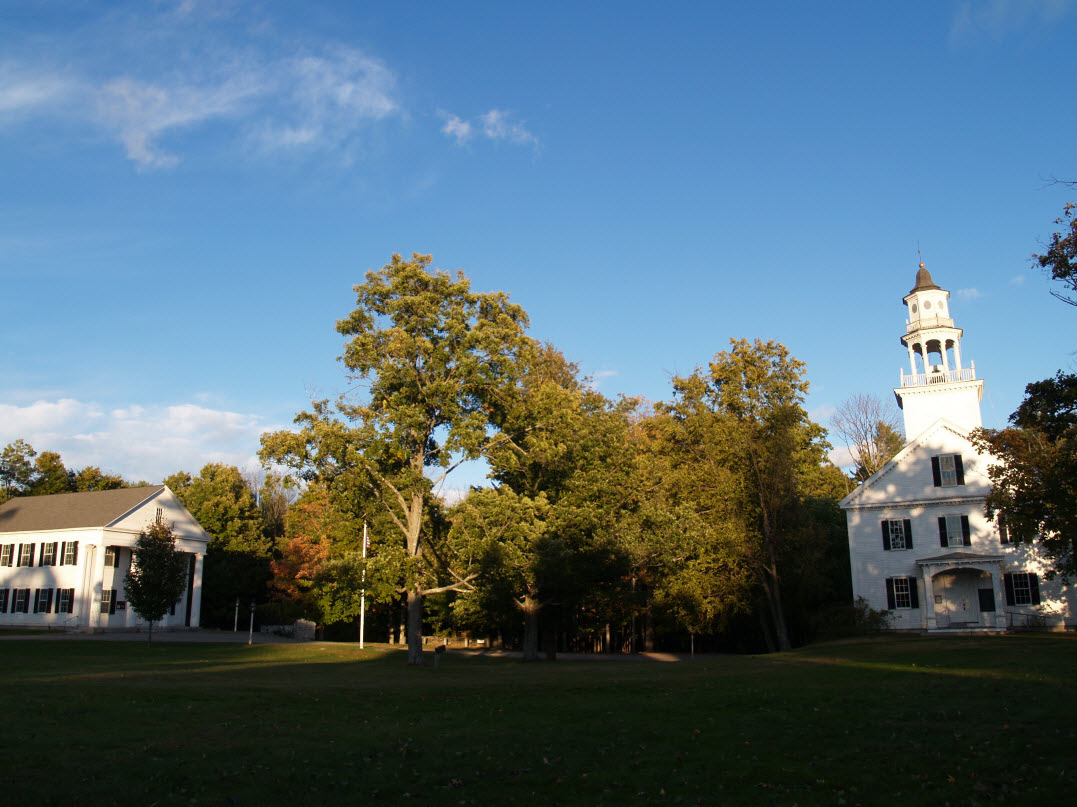

- Location within Massachusetts Location within the United States
- Location: Shirley, Massachusetts
- Coordinates: 42°34′18″N 71°39′3″W
- Built: 1753
- Architect: Multiple
- Architectural style: Greek Revival, Georgian, Federal
- NRHP reference No.: 88001454
- Added to NRHP: September 1, 1988

The Shirley Center Historic District encompasses the original historic center of Shirley, Massachusetts. The district is centered on the 1753 town common area, from which five roads (Brown, Center, Horsepond, Parker and Whitney Roads) radiate away. The district includes the buildings that surround the common, as well as some that line these roads. The district includes Shirley's town hall and First Parish Congregational Church.

The district features Greek Revival, Georgian, and Federal style architecture. It was added to the National Register of Historic Places in 1988.

== See also ==
- National Register of Historic Places listings in Middlesex County, Massachusetts
- Shirley Village Historic District
