= 2004 Baseball Hall of Fame balloting =

Elections to the Baseball Hall of Fame

National Baseball

Hall of Fame and Museum
- New inductees: 2
- via BBWAA: 2
- Total inductees: 258
- Induction date: July 25, 2004

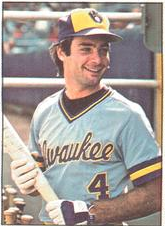
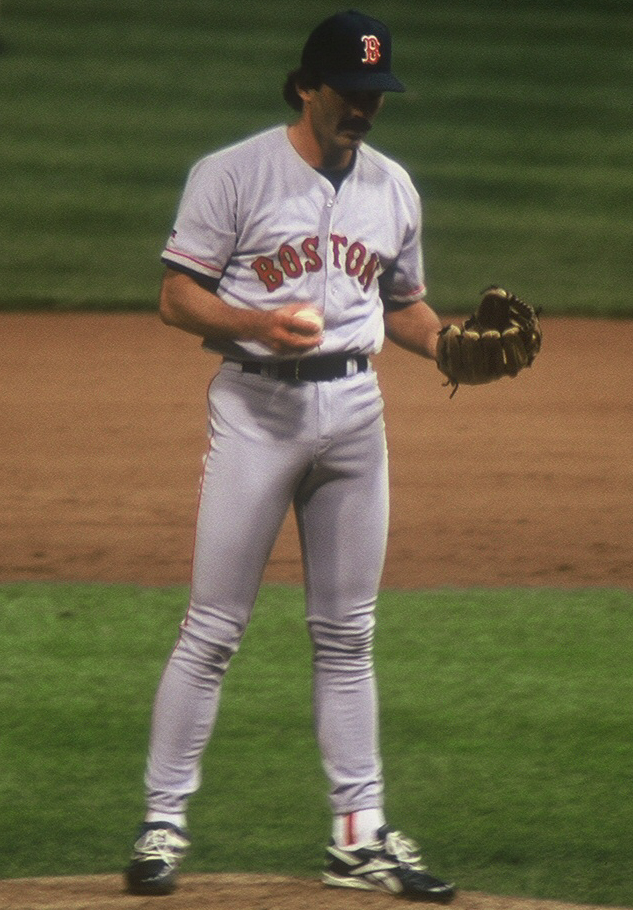
2004 inductees Paul Molitor (left) and Dennis Eckersley

Elections to the Baseball Hall of Fame for 2004 proceeded in keeping with rules enacted in 2001. The Baseball Writers' Association of America (BBWAA) held an election to select from recent players; Dennis Eckersley and Paul Molitor gained induction to the Hall.

The Veterans Committee did not hold an election; the 2001 rules changes provided that elections for players retired over 20 years would be held every other year, with elections of non-players (managers, umpires and executives) held every fourth year. The Committee held elections in 2003 in both categories, including players who were active no later than 1981. The next election for players was in 2005; elections in both categories would again be held in 2007.

The induction ceremonies were held on July 25 in Cooperstown, with Commissioner Bud Selig presiding.

== BBWAA election ==
The BBWAA was again authorized to elect players active in 1984 or later, but not after 1998; the ballot included candidates from the 2003 ballot who received at least 5% of the vote but were not elected, along with selected players, chosen by a screening committee, whose last appearance was in 1998. All 10-year members of the BBWAA were eligible to vote.

Voters were instructed to cast votes for up to 10 candidates; any candidate receiving votes on at least 75% of the ballots would be honored with induction to the Hall. Results of the 2004 election by the BBWAA were announced on January 6. The ballot consisted of 32 players; 506 ballots were cast, with 380 votes required for election. A total of 3314 individual votes were cast, an average of 6.55 per ballot. Those candidates receiving less than 5% of the vote (25 votes) will not appear on future BBWAA ballots, but may eventually be considered by the Veterans Committee.

Candidates who were eligible for the first time are indicated here with a dagger (†). The two candidates who received at least 75% of the vote and were elected are indicated in bold italics; candidates who have since been selected in subsequent elections are indicated in italics. The candidates who received less than 5% of the vote, thus becoming ineligible for future BBWAA consideration, are indicated with an asterisk (*).

Player	Votes	Percent	Change	Year
**Paul Molitor**†	**431**	**85.1**	-	1st
**Dennis Eckersley**†	**421**	**83.2**	-	1st
Ryne Sandberg	309	61.1	▲11.9%	2nd
Bruce Sutter	301	59.5	▲5.9%	11th
Jim Rice	276	54.5	▲2.3%	10th
Andre Dawson	253	50.0	Steady	3rd
Goose Gossage	206	40.7	▼1.4%	5th
Lee Smith	185	36.6	▼5.7%	2nd
Bert Blyleven	179	35.4	▲6.2%	7th
Jack Morris	133	26.3	▲3.5%	5th
Steve Garvey	123	24.3	▼3.5%	12th
Tommy John	111	21.9	▼1.5%	10th
Alan Trammell	70	13.8	▼0.3%	3rd
Don Mattingly	65	12.8	▼0.9%	4th
Dave Concepción	57	11.3	▲0.2%	11th
Dave Parker	53	10.4	▲0.1%	8th
Dale Murphy	43	8.5	▼3.2%	6th
Keith Hernandez*	22	4.3	▼1.7%	9th
Joe Carter†*	19	3.8	-	1st
Fernando Valenzuela*	19	3.8	▼2.5%	2nd
Dennis Martínez†*	16	3.2	-	1st
Dave Stieb†*	7	1.4	-	1st
Jim Eisenreich†*	3	0.6	-	1st
Jimmy Key†*	3	0.6	-	1st
Doug Drabek†*	2	0.4	-	1st
Kevin Mitchell†*	2	0.4	-	1st
Juan Samuel†*	2	0.4	-	1st
Cecil Fielder†*	1	0.2	-	1st
Randy Myers†*	1	0.2	-	1st
Terry Pendleton†*	1	0.2	-	1st
Danny Darwin†*	0	0.0	-	1st
Bob Tewksbury†*	0	0.0	-	1st

Key
	Elected to the Hall of Fame on this ballot (named in **bold italics**).
	Elected subsequently, as of 2026 (named in plain italics).
	Renominated for the 2005 BBWAA election by adequate performance on this ballot and has not been elected, as of 2026.
	Eliminated from annual BBWAA consideration by poor performance or expiration on this ballot and has not been elected, as of 2026.
†	First time on the BBWAA ballot.
*	Eliminated from annual BBWAA consideration by poor performance or expiration on this ballot.

The newly eligible candidates included 17 All-Stars, five of whom were not on the ballot, who were selected a total of 52 times. While no player was selected more than ten times, Paul Molitor (seven times), Dave Stieb (seven), Dennis Eckersley (six) and Joe Carter (five) were selected five times or more. The field included two Cy Young Award winners (Eckersley and Doug Drabek), three MVPs (Eckersley, Terry Pendleton and Kevin Mitchell) and one Rookie of the Year (Jerome Walton).

Players eligible for the first time who were not included on the ballot were: Rafael Belliard, Greg Cadaret, Tony Castillo, Dave Clark, Joey Cora, Mike Devereaux, Erik Hanson, Xavier Hernandez, Chris Hoiles, Rex Hudler, Pete Incaviglia, Mark Lemke, Nelson Liriano, John Marzano, Tom Pagnozzi, Donn Pall, Mark Parent, Bob Patterson, Billy Ripken, Luis Rivera, Bip Roberts, Craig Shipley, Pete Smith, Bill Swift, Jerome Walton, David West, and Eddie Williams.

None of the newly-eligible candidates would appear on any future ballots. As expected, Eckersley and Molitor were elected on their first appearance; no other first-timer received the 5% of votes required to remain on the ballot.

== J. G. Taylor Spink Award ==
Murray Chass received the J. G. Taylor Spink Award honoring a baseball writer. (The award was voted at the December 2003 meeting of the BBWAA, dated 2003, and conferred in the summer 2004 ceremonies.)

The Spink Award has been presented by the BBWAA at the annual summer induction ceremonies since 1962. It recognizes a sportswriter "for meritorious contributions to baseball writing". The recipients are not members of the Hall of the Fame, merely featured in a permanent exhibit at the National Baseball Museum, but writers and broadcasters commonly call them "Hall of Fame writers" or words to that effect. Living recipients were members of the Veterans Committee for elections in odd years 2003 to 2007.

Three final candidates, selected by a BBWAA committee, were named on July 15, 2003 in Chicago in conjunction with All-Star Game activities; the finalists were: Murray Chass, who covered the New York Yankees for The New York Times; Joe Goddard, who has long covered the Chicago Cubs and White Sox for the Chicago Sun-Times; and Bob Burnes, who covered the St. Louis Browns for the St. Louis Globe-Democrat. All 10-year members of the BBWAA were eligible to cast ballots in voting conducted by mail in November.

On December 17, Murray Chass was announced as the recipient, having received 280 votes out of the 438 ballots cast, with Goddard receiving 98 votes and Burnes receiving 60 .

== Ford C. Frick Award ==
Lon Simmons received the Ford C. Frick Award honoring a baseball broadcaster.

The Frick Award has been presented at the annual summer induction ceremonies since 1978. It recognizes a broadcaster for "major contributions to baseball". The recipients are not members of the Hall of the Fame, merely featured in a permanent exhibit at the National Baseball Museum, but writers and broadcasters commonly call them "Hall of Fame broadcaster" or words to that effect. Living honorees were members of the Veterans Committee for elections in odd years 2003 to 2007.

To be eligible, an active or retired broadcaster must have a minimum of 10 years of continuous major league broadcast service with a ball club, a network, or a combination of the two; more than 160 candidates were eligible.

On December 11, 2003, 10 finalists were announced. In accordance with guidelines established in 2003, seven were chosen by a research committee at the museum: Ken Coleman, Jack Graney, Graham McNamee, Hal Totten, Gene Elston, France Laux and Ty Tyson. Three additional candidates – Joe Nuxhall, Dave Niehaus and Lon Simmons – were selected in voting by over 105,000 fans prior to November 2003 at the Hall's official website .

On February 26, Lon Simmons was announced as the 2004 recipient ; an original voice of the San Francisco Giants, as well as an announcer for the Oakland Athletics. He called games for 41 years before retiring following the 2002 season. He was selected in a January vote by a 20-member committee composed of the 14 living recipients, along with six additional broadcasting historians or columnists: Bob Costas (NBC), Barry Horn (The Dallas Morning News), Stan Isaacs (formerly of New York Newsday), Ted Patterson (historian), Curt Smith (historian) and Larry Stewart (Los Angeles Times). Committee members are asked to base the selection on the following criteria: longevity; continuity with a club; honors, including national assignments such as the World Series and All-Star Games; and popularity with fans.
