= Shirley Village Historic District =

Historic district in Massachusetts, United States

- U.S. National Register of Historic Places
- U.S. Historic district
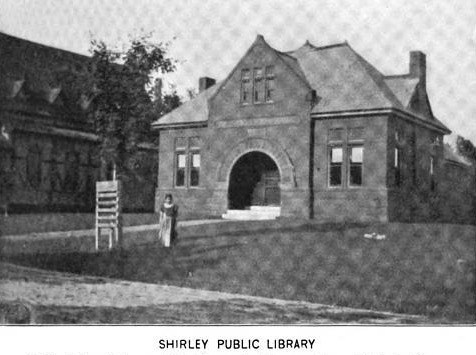
- The Hazen Public Library, c. 1899

- Location within Massachusetts Location within the United States
- Location: Shirley, Massachusetts
- Coordinates: 42°32′33″N 71°39′7″W
- Architectural style: Greek Revival, Gothic Revival, Federal
- NRHP reference No.: 91001958
- Added to NRHP: January 23, 1992

The Shirley Village Historic District encompasses the main commercial and industrial village of Shirley, Massachusetts. It is located in the southern part of the town, and grew up around a series of mills that were located along Catacoonamug Brook, and then the railroad, which was built through the area in the 1840s. The district contains 441 properties. It is roughly bounded by Center, Harvard, Leominster and Shaker Roads. The district was listed on the National Register of Historic Places in 1992.

== Description and history ==
The town of Shirley was settled in the 1720s and incorporated in 1775. Its colonial town center (recognized in the Shirley Center Historic District) was nearer its geographic center than Shirley Village. The village grew in the 19th century as an industrial site, overtaking the original center economically, and eventually also becoming the site of its main municipal buildings. Catacoonamug Brook, the source of its early power, was the site of a gristmill and sawmill as early as 1740. Lancaster Road, which passes through the village, was also the only major stagecoach route in the town, and the village was also where the Boston and Fitchburg Railroad was routed through in 1845. The village's dominant economic force thereafter were the cotton mills, of which the large building of the Phoenix Mills still stands. Residential growth on the south side of the railroad in the second half of the 19th century resulted in a large number of mainly vernacular wood frame residences.

The focal point of the district is near its western end, where Leominster, Lancaster, and Harvard Roads meet with Main Street and Center Road in a series of intersections. The district radiates out for short distances along most of these roads, and more significantly to the east, along Front and Fredonia Streets and Ayer Road. There is one cemetery, the Village Cemetery on Harvard Road, established in 1849. Notable brick buildings in the district include several schoolhouses, the war memorial hall, and the library, a handsome Richardsonian Romanesque building trimmed in brownstone.

== See also ==
- National Register of Historic Places listings in Middlesex County, Massachusetts
- Shirley Center Historic District
