= Jerry Remy =

American baseball player and broadcaster (1952–2021)

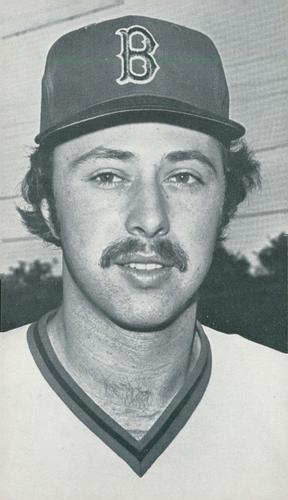
- Remy with the Boston Red Sox in 1978
- Second baseman
- Born: November 8, 1952; Fall River, Massachusetts, U.S.
- Died: October 30, 2021 (aged 68); Boston, Massachusetts, U.S.
- Batted: Left Threw: Right

MLB debut
- April 7, 1975, for the California Angels

Last MLB appearance
- May 18, 1984, for the Boston Red Sox

MLB statistics
- Batting average: .275
- Home runs: 7
- Runs batted in: 329
- Stats at Baseball Reference

Teams
- California Angels (1975–1977); Boston Red Sox (1978–1984)

Career highlights and awards
- All-Star (1978); Boston Red Sox Hall of Fame

Gerald Peter Remy (November 8, 1952 – October 30, 2021) was an American professional baseball player and sports broadcaster. He played in Major League Baseball (MLB) as a second baseman for ten seasons—three with the California Angels (1975–1977) and seven with the Boston Red Sox (1978–1984). After retiring from professional play, Remy was a color commentator for televised Red Sox games for 33 years until his death.

Remy began commentating with the TV channel New England Sports Network (NESN) in 1988, and later expanded to over-the-air television in 1995. A native of Somerset, Massachusetts, Remy was a popular local figure, known for his exuberance, humorous non-sequitur game commentary, and thick New England accent that endeared him with Red Sox fans. He was given the nickname "RemDawg" and was elected "President" of Red Sox Nation in 2007. Remy also owned restaurants in the Boston area, and wrote books about baseball.

== Early life ==
Gerald Peter Remy was born in Fall River, Massachusetts, on November 8, 1952, and grew up in nearby Somerset. He attended Somerset High School and Roger Williams University in Bristol, Rhode Island. He was of French Canadian descent.

== Playing career ==
Remy was selected by the Washington Senators in the 19th round of the 1970 MLB draft, but he did not sign. He was then selected in the 8th round of the January supplemental phase of the 1971 MLB draft (129th overall) by the California Angels, and signed with the team.

=== Minor leagues (1971–1974) ===
Remy played four seasons in the Angels' farm system: 1971 with the rookie league Magic Valley Cowboys, 1972 with the Class A Stockton Ports, 1973 with the Class A Quad City Angels (.335, 4 home runs and 36 RBI in 117 games), and 1974 with Double-A El Paso Diablos and the Triple-A Salt Lake City Angels, where he hit a combined .323 with 4 home runs and 67 RBI. Overall, Remy appeared in 421 games in Minor League Baseball, batting .275 with 12 home runs and 152 RBIs.

=== California Angels (1975–1977) ===
Remy made his major league debut with the Angels on April 7, 1975. He hit a single off of Steve Busby of the Kansas City Royals in his first at bat and was subsequently picked off. With the 1975 Angels, Remy played 147 games (145 starts) as the Angels' second baseman, batting .258 with one home run and 46 RBIs. He had 34 stolen bases, but was caught stealing a league-leading 21 times. The following year, his average rose slightly to .263, although with no home runs and 28 RBIs. In 1977, he had a career-high four home runs, along with a .252 average and 44 RBIs; he was named team captain of the Angels in June, becoming only the second captain in the team's history.

Overall, in three seasons with the Angels, Remy played in 444 games, batting .258 with five home runs, 118 RBIs, and 110 stolen bases. On December 8, 1977, he was traded to the Boston Red Sox in exchange for pitcher Don Aase and cash considerations.

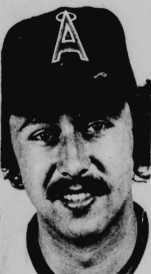
Remy in 1977

=== Boston Red Sox (1978–1984) ===
Remy was the Red Sox's starting second baseman in 1978 and was selected for the MLB All-Star Game, although he did not play in the game. Overall, with the 1978 Red Sox, he batted .278 with 44 RBIs and 30 stolen bases in 148 games. He also had two home runs, the last ones of his career. In the 1978 American League East tie-breaker game against the New York Yankees, Remy was on base in the ninth inning when Carl Yastrzemski made the final out; it was the closest Remy came to the postseason in his MLB career.

Remy continued as Boston's starting second baseman for the next six seasons, although he was often hampered by injuries. In 1979, he played in 80 games and batted .297. In 1980, he batted a career-high .313 but was limited to 63 games; he also appeared in the outfield for the only time in his career, playing the ninth inning in right field during a May loss to the Cleveland Indians. In 1981, Remy played in 88 games while batting .307. On September 3–4, 1981, he accomplished the rare feat of collecting six hits in a game, going 6-for-10 in a 20-inning game against the Seattle Mariners.

In 1982, Remy appeared in a career-high 155 games while batting .280; in 1983, he batted .275 while playing in 146 games. In 1984, a knee injury limited him to 30 games for the season, during which he batted .250; he made his final start at second base on May 5, and his final MLB appearance on May 18 when he flied out as a pinch hitter. Remy was released by the Red Sox on December 10, 1985, and he retired during spring training in 1986. Overall, in seven seasons with the Red Sox, Remy played in 710 games, batting .286 with two home runs, 211 RBIs, and 98 stolen bases.

During his ten-year MLB career, Remy batted .275 with seven home runs, 329 RBIs, and 208 stolen bases in 1154 games. Defensively, he had a .981 fielding percentage. Bill James, in his Historical Abstract, rated Remy as the 100th greatest second baseman of all time as of 2001.

== Post-playing career ==
=== Broadcaster ===
Jerry Remy
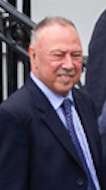
- Remy at the White House in 2019
- Years active: 1988–2021
- Sports commentary career
- Team: Boston Red Sox
- Genre: Color commentator
- Sport: Major League Baseball
- Employer: New England Sports Network

After 1988, Remy found success in broadcasting, working for the New England Sports Network (NESN), as the regular color commentator for NESN's Red Sox broadcasts. Initially paired with Ned Martin through 1992 and Bob Kurtz from 1993–2000, from 2001 through the end of the 2015 season, he teamed with play-by-play announcer Don Orsillo; starting with the 2016 season, Remy worked with Dave O'Brien. Beginning in 1995, he also replaced former color commentator Bob Montgomery on the over-the-air Red Sox broadcasting team, paired with Sean McDonough for those broadcasts through 2004, when Orsillo took over for McDonough on the over-the-air games as well. He also ran a website, The Remy Report, which covered Boston Red Sox news and information.

=== Restaurateur ===
Remy owned a hot dog stand, RemDawg's, a nod to the nickname he held among Red Sox fans, located just outside Fenway Park, as well as Jerry Remy's Sports Bar & Grill in Terminal C of Logan International Airport. There were three other Bar & Grill locations: one behind Fenway Park on Boylston Street that opened March 9, 2010, which was reported closed in March 2015, and subsequently became a Tony C’s Sports Bar & Grill (named after another former Red Sox player, Tony Conigliaro); a second in the Seaport District of South Boston, which in December 2016 also became a Tony C’s Sports Bar & Grill; and a third in Remy's birthplace of Fall River that opened in October 2012, which in March 2018, The Herald News of Fall River reported would be closed.

=== Author ===
Remy wrote three books about baseball, and several children's books about Red Sox mascot Wally the Green Monster, which began as an idea based on Remy's storytelling while broadcasting Red Sox games.

- Remy, Jerry (2004). Watching Baseball: Discovering the Game within the Game. with Corey Sandler. Globe Pequot. ISBN 0762730757.
- Remy, Jerry (2009). Jerry Remy's Red Sox Heroes: The RemDawg's All-Time Favorite Red Sox, Great Moments, and Top Teams. with Corey Sandler. Lyons Press. ISBN 978-1599214061.
- Remy, Jerry; Cafardo, Nick (2019). If These Walls Could Talk: Stories from the Boston Red Sox Dugout, Locker Room, and Press Box. Triumph Books. ISBN 978-1629375458.

Wally the Green Monster series

- Remy, Jerry (2006). Hello, Wally!. Illustrated by Danny Moore. Mascot Books. ISBN 1-932888-80-2.
- Remy, Jerry (2007). Wally the Green Monster and His Journey Through Red Sox Nation!. Illustrated by Danny Moore. Mascot Books. ISBN 978-1932888898.
- Remy, Jerry (2008). A Season With Wally the Green Monster. Illustrated by Kevin Coffey. Mascot Books. ISBN 978-1934878071.
- Remy, Jerry (2008). Coast to Coast With Wally the Green Monster. Illustrated by Justin Hilton. Mascot Books. ISBN 978-1934878088.
- Remy, Jerry (2009). Wally the Green Monster and His World Tour. Illustrated by Danny Moore. Mascot Books. ISBN 978-1934878491.

In 2012, to commemorate the 100th anniversary of Fenway Park, then-Red Sox second baseman Dustin Pedroia authored a sixth book in the series, Wally The Green Monster's Journey Through Time.

== Charity work ==
Remy worked extensively with The Jimmy Fund, a charity that supports the Dana–Farber Cancer Institute. He was known to invite cancer patients in the broadcast booth, visit with patients in hospitals, and participated in their annual telethon.

== Health ==
In November 2008, Remy had surgery to remove a "very small, low-grade cancerous area" from his lung, most likely a result of years of smoking cigarettes. During his recovery from the surgery, he suffered from an infection as well as a bout of pneumonia. Due to fatigue and depression, Remy took an indefinite leave of absence from his broadcast duties for NESN, starting April 30, 2009.

On August 12, 2009, Remy went to Fenway Park and attended Red Sox manager Terry Francona's pre-game press conference. He told both NESN and The Boston Globe that he had every intention of returning to broadcasting Red Sox games during the remainder of the 2009 season. He entered the NESN's broadcast booth during the top of the second inning during the night's game to speak with broadcasters Don Orsillo and Dennis Eckersley. It was the first time he had been in the booth since he took his leave of absence in April. In between the top and the bottom of the second inning, Remy, still in the booth, was shown on Fenway's center field scoreboard display, to which he received a standing ovation from the crowd attending the game. He revealed during the visit that he had suffered from depression following his physical problems of 2008 and that he was receiving therapy. On August 19, 2009, Remy released a statement announcing his return to commentating on August 21, 2009, against the New York Yankees. He stated that he would likely skip some road trips. He returned full-time for the 2010 baseball season. In April 2013, he announced that he had suffered a relapse that offseason when cancer was found in a different spot on his lungs during his regular six-month CT scan that January.

Remy took time off starting May 28, 2013, due to a bout of pneumonia. He returned to the booth on June 25, 2013. On August 16, 2013, he announced that he would be taking an indefinite leave of absence after his son was arrested for murder; Remy did not return to the broadcast booth until the beginning of the 2014 season. He had another leave during the 2016–17 off-season, missing most of the 2017 spring training.

On June 12, 2017, Remy announced that his lung cancer had returned. In January 2018, he announced via Twitter that he had completed treatments at Massachusetts General Hospital (MGH). A fourth diagnosis of cancer was announced on August 7, 2018. After undergoing treatments, Remy announced in early November 2018 that he was cancer-free.

On June 11, 2021, Remy left Fenway Park during the third inning of a game he was commentating on, due to shortness of breath, and was admitted to MGH. He was released from the hospital five days later, and returned to broadcasting on June 20. On August 4, Remy announced that he would be stepping away from NESN for lung cancer treatment. On October 5, he appeared at Fenway Park to throw out the ceremonial first pitch before the AL Wild Card Game, in what ended up being his final public appearance.

Remy died of lung cancer on October 30, 2021, aged 68. A public wake was held in Waltham, Massachusetts, on November 4.

== Legacy ==
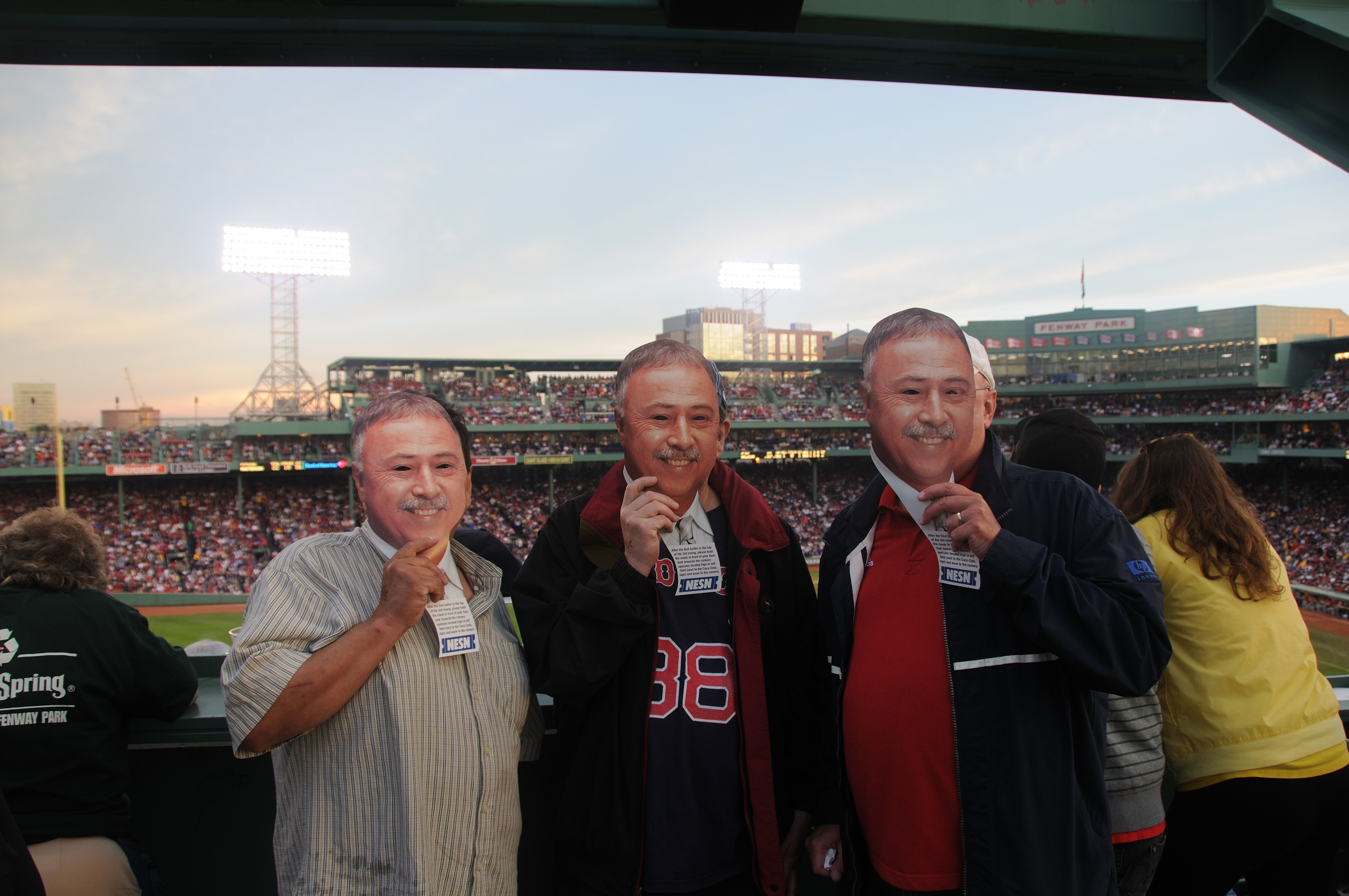
Red Sox fans with Jerry Remy masks at Fenway Park in 2008

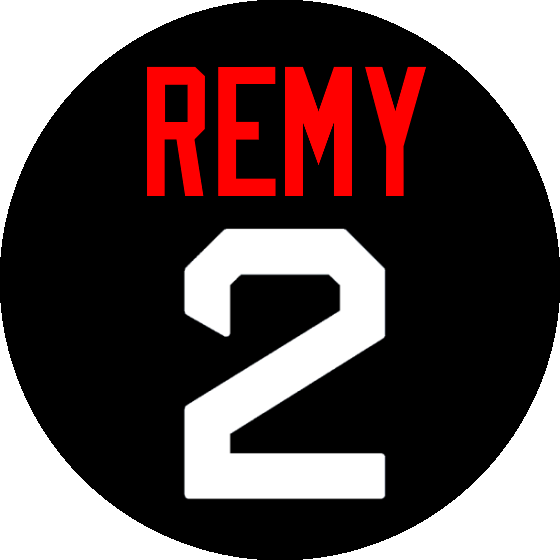
Patch worn by the Red Sox in memory of Remy during the 2022 season

Remy and broadcast partner Don Orsillo won four New England Emmy awards, and Remy was voted Massachusetts' favorite sports announcer in 2004 by Sports Illustrated. Remy was inducted into the Boston Red Sox Hall of Fame in 2006, and elected honorary President of Red Sox Nation in 2007. NESN and the Red Sox celebrated Jerry Remy Day at Fenway Park on June 24, 2008, in honor of Remy's 20 years of service for the network. He was inducted into the Massachusetts Broadcasters Hall of Fame in 2017.

After his death, Joe Buck, veteran sports broadcaster, called Remy's sports broadcasting career "legendary" and called him a "force in the booth", noting "If Red Sox Nation had an emperor, the ‘RemDawg,’ it would be him." Broadcaster Sean McDonough, who of his own accord has worked with at least 160 different broadcast partners, said of his time with Remy: "nothing felt as special as the nine years I spent with Jerry".

On April 15, 2022, the date of the home opener for the season, the team issued a Tweet showing that the NESN broadcasting booth at Fenway Park was now named the Jerry Remy Booth, in his memory. The booth has also been adorned with a memorial plaque honoring Remy. The team held a ceremony to honor Remy prior to their home game of April 20, including appearances from former teammates Dennis Eckersley, Carl Yastrzemski, Rick Burleson, Dwight Evans, Fred Lynn, Jim Rice, and Bob Stanley.

== Family ==
Remy and his wife Phoebe had three children, Jared, Jordan, and Jenna.

Jordan was selected by the Red Sox in the 49th round of the 1999 MLB draft, but he did not play professionally.

Jared worked for the Red Sox as a security guard, but was fired in 2008 after another guard told the State Police that Jared had sold him steroids. On August 16, 2013, Jared was arrested in the fatal stabbing of his girlfriend, Jennifer Martel, a charge he pleaded guilty to on May 27, 2014. Jared Remy was sentenced to life in state prison without the possibility of parole.

== See also ==
- List of Major League Baseball single-game hits leaders
- List of Boston Red Sox broadcasters
