= Jared Remy =

American career criminal (born 1978)

- Born: September 7, 1978 (age 47); Weston, Massachusetts
- Parent(s): Jerry Remy, Phoebe Remy

Jared Whelan Remy (born September 7, 1978) is an American career criminal who pleaded guilty to the murder of his girlfriend, Jennifer Martel. He is the son of the late Boston Red Sox player and broadcaster Jerry Remy. Jared previously worked for the Red Sox's security staff, but was fired after a Major League Baseball investigation implicated him in steroid distribution.

His case is featured on the Season 5, Episode 3, titled ‘’Crazy in Love’’, from the show Deadly Sins.

== Early life ==
Remy was born in 1978 to Jerry and Phoebe Remy. Due to his struggles with dyslexia and aggression, Weston, Massachusetts public schools paid for Remy to attend the Gifford School, a special education program for students with learning or behavioral problems. He was allowed to play after-school sports at Weston High School, but behavioral problems led to these privileges being revoked. On January 25, 1996, Jerry Remy called the Weston police because he was concerned that his son was harassing an ex-girlfriend. The ex-girlfriend and her father considered filing for a restraining order, but were concerned that Jared Remy would retaliate if they did. He also allegedly threatened her new boyfriend. After this incident, Remy was sent to Florida, where his father was covering Red Sox spring training.

Upon his return, Remy began dating Tiffany Guyette, who also attended the Gifford School. When he was nineteen, and Guyette was fifteen, she became pregnant. According to Guyette, Remy was verbally abusive and belittled her weight gain during her pregnancy. He also attempted to shove her out of a moving car. On January 18, 1997, Remy allegedly led a group of teens that assaulted a fifteen-year-old friend of Guyette's in Franklin, Massachusetts. The boy was later found by police incoherent; although he recovered from his "life-threatening head injuries", his relatives described his cognitive function and mood as permanently altered, and at twenty-two he shot himself to death.

In September 1997, Jared Remy's son was born.

== Personality ==
Remy was described by his psychologist as exhibiting impulsivity and having overly aggressive responses. He also had a profound difficulty distinguishing his feelings." The psychologist recommended Remy to take anti-anxiety medication, but Remy refused.

A neighbor of Remy and Jennifer Martel described him as "very controlling" and quick-tempered. Martel's grandfather said that Remy had been degrading Martel for years.

== Legal issues ==
On August 7, 1998, Remy was arrested on charges of domestic violence and malicious destruction of property after he assaulted Guyette while she held their child, and damaged her car. On October 21, Judge Gregory C. Flynn of the Waltham District Court granted a "continuance without a finding" (also known as "CWOF"), meaning that Remy was required to make an admission to allegations that would support a finding of guilt on the record, following which he was placed on probation. If he violated his probation, he could be found guilty and sentenced, but if he successfully completed his probation, the case would be dismissed, and no formal finding of guilt would ever be entered on his record. Remy was ordered, as a condition of his probation, to attend counseling, check in regularly with a probation officer and stay out of trouble for one year.

On October 9, 1999, just two weeks before his probation was set to end, Remy became enraged after learning Guyette was spending time with one of his old high school friends, Erik Jackiewicz. According to Guyette, Jackiewicz, and Dedham District Court records, Remy drove to Jackiewicz's Norwood apartment and smashed a beer bottle over his head. Once again, Remy was let go with a CWOF, despite violation of his previous "CWOF."

In 2000, Remy moved into an apartment with his new girlfriend and a roommate who was a friend of his from the Gifford School. On March 25, 2000, Remy's roommate requested a restraining order against Remy. He said Remy had barged into his place of employment, blamed him for his latest breakup, boasted of having a gun and threatened to kill him. The roommate decided not to complete the request for a restraining order but instead asked police to tell Remy to leave him alone. He also told police they could find steroids in Remy's closet. The police went to the apartment and, with Remy's consent, searched his closet. Inside, they found a gym bag containing "several hunting knives" and a baggie holding nine uncapped syringes, but no drugs.

On April 3, 2000, Remy called Waltham police and asked for help with an unwanted person report. Officers arrived to the scene and found Remy "yelling and screaming" at his mother through her car window. Remy grew more belligerent and when an officer approached Remy to ask him a question, Remy elbowed him in the stomach area. He was arrested and charged with disturbing the peace.

On April 4, 2000, Remy's girlfriend filed a criminal complaint against Remy for making threats. According to her, Remy repeatedly called her that weekend to profess his love for her and threatened to "kill her if they don't get back together." She did not appear in court and Remy's attorney, Peter Bella, had the case referred out for a magistrate's hearing. The hearing was rescheduled four times before being dismissed.

On May 3, 2000, he was charged with possessing a hypodermic needle.

In 2000, Guyette was granted sole custody of her and Remy's child, and Remy was not allowed to take the child out alone. According to her attorney, the court-appointed guardian that investigated the child's welfare found that "Jared was not doing what the court asked, that his parents were enabling him, and that Tiffany was the better parent." On January 21, 2001, Remy called Guyette and asked if he could take their son to a birthday party for the child of his new girlfriend. Guyette refused, and Remy threatened to kill her and her boyfriend. Guyette filed a restraining order against him that day. The case went to trial on June 1, 2001. Guyette was prepared to testify and the prosecution asked for three months in jail with three months suspended. Although Remy admitted to threatening Guyette, the judge, Neil Walker, admitted that probation did not seem to be working for Remy. The case was continued without a finding of guilt on condition Remy should remain in counseling and not violate the law any further. (Guyette lost custody in 2007, after the Remys prevailed in a second case, brought at a time Guyette was in another abusive relationship.)

On April 9, 2001, he was charged with striking a man with a bottle.

In 2001, Remy began dating 21-year-old Waltham mother, Ryan McMahon. At least eight times during their relationship, police reported claims Remy harassed, threatened, or physically abused her. In restraining-order affidavits, she alleged Remy was using steroids, cocaine, painkillers, marijuana, and alcohol. She refused to testify against Remy which made prosecution difficult. On September 18, 2002, Remy was charged with threatening to kill her. On July 3, 2003, McMahon told police that he had threatened to kill her several times over the preceding week, and then confronted her at work where he punched her in the back. He was arrested on July 4. He quickly posted bail and as soon as he was released, he used his cell phone to call McMahon and threaten her, which resulted in additional charges. On July 7, Judge Gregory C. Flynn released Remy on a $500 bail, paid by his mother, Phoebe Remy, on the condition that he move back into his parents' home and observe a curfew keeping him indoors from 6 p.m. to 6 a.m. while awaiting trial.

On December 19, 2002, Remy's ex-roommate filed restraining order against him after Remy allegedly attacked him and his father.

On March 7, 2003, Remy was charged with hitting one of McMahon's closest girlfriends in the head with a bottle at a bar.

In July 2004, Remy was charged with assault and battery with a dangerous weapon after he hit McMahon in the face with a cordless phone. His mother, Phoebe, posted his bail, again worth $500.

On August 2, 2004, Remy was charged with vandalism after McMahon found him cutting up her clothes and pictures with scissors. He was released on a $500 bail with the agreement of the prosecutors who insisted that Remy should find a job. Remy was hired by the Red Sox to work as a security guard at Fenway Park.

On November 7, 2005, police responded to a domestic disturbance at Remy's home in Waltham, Massachusetts. Police stated that Remy had grabbed McMahon by her hair, dragged her down the stairs, threw her to the ground, threw a cell phone at her, and kicked her in the back, stomach, and face. She was beaten so badly that she suffered a broken nose, a bloodied lip, and had a welt around one eye. She was taken to Newton-Wellesley Hospital. Remy was arrested at his father's home in Weston, Massachusetts, and charged with assault, battery, and resisting arrest. Remy admitted to police that he had "slapped her around," but dismissed the likely consequences as just "another year of probation." At his arraignment the next morning, Remy ignored the restraining order against him and walked up to McMahon, accusing her of cheating. When she forced him to look at her bruised face, he put his head down, blamed "the Anadrol" and said that he was sorry, and that he was going to miss her. On November 10, 2005, Remy was charged with violating the restraining order. Judge Flynn remanded Remy to jail as he deemed it necessary for McMahon's safety. Six days later, McMahon returned to court and asked to have the restraining order lifted. Remy's attorney requested Remy to be released and allowed to resume living with McMahon on the conditions they pursue couples counseling and Remy work on his anger management, but the judge ruled against it. While in jail, Remy was said to have traded his father's autograph in exchange for favors such as having his back shaved. Remy later pleaded guilty and received two years' probation. After his release from jail, Remy returned to his job at Fenway Park.

On January 31, 2011, Remy was charged with driving with a suspended license.

== Steroid use and dismissal from Red Sox ==
In September 2003, Remy was leaving Waltham District Court, where hearings on three of his cases were held, when a police officer observed him shouting loudly into his cell phone. The officer performed a background check and discovered that Remy was driving with a suspended license. The officer pulled him over and when police towed Remy's car, they found needles and steroids inside his backpack. Remy was charged with driving with a suspended license as well as illegal possession of drugs and hypodermic needles.

In 2004, Remy began working at Fenway Park as a security guard. He typically worked day shifts, guarding gates, and searching the bags of guests who toured the park. He also served on the 2004 World Series Trophy's security detail during its travels around New England.

In 2007, Remy and another security guard, Nicholas Alex Cyr, were reprimanded for taking boxes of World Series jackets.

In July 2008, the Massachusetts State Police confiscated a vial of Anadrol from Cyr's car. He told police that he had purchased the steroids from Remy. Remy denied being the supplier, but acknowledged being a steroid user. Both men were suspended and questioned about whether the drug was being used by Red Sox players. Remy and Cyr were both fired in September.

== Assault and murder of Jennifer Martel ==
In 2007, Remy met Jennifer Martel, a 22-year-old Taunton, Massachusetts, native who was casually dating one of Remy's co-workers. Martel initially described her relationship with Remy as a fling, but she unexpectedly became pregnant and the two moved in together. In September 2008, Martel gave birth to the couple's daughter. In 2009, Remy and Martel became engaged. However, Martel canceled the engagement and told her mother that she would never marry Remy. During her last few years, Martel was unhappy and told her mother that she was planning to leave.

On August 13, 2013, Remy got into an argument with Martel. The argument escalated, and Remy pushed her into a bathroom mirror. Remy was arrested and charged with assault and battery with a dangerous weapon. Shortly after, Martel obtained an emergency restraining order. On August 14, Remy was arraigned in Waltham District Court. He pleaded not guilty. The Middlesex County District Attorney's office recommended that he should be released on his personal recognizance and he was released by the judge with a bail warning and a no-abuse order. Martel elected not to have the restraining order extended. According to Martel's mother, her daughter did not extend the restraining order at the request of Remy's mother.

On August 15, Waltham police were called to Remy and Martel's home after multiple calls to 911 reported a stabbing. Neighbors witnessed Remy assault Martel and one of them unsuccessfully attempted to pull him off her. Detectives stated that there was a long, protracted struggle in the home that went through the kitchen, stairway, living room, and onto the patio where Remy pinned Martel down, and stabbed her multiple times. According to the police report, Martel had stab wounds to her shoulder and neck. She was found without a shirt and had a blue cloth covering her face. Martel died from her injuries. Their daughter was present at the residence at the time of the attack and was unharmed. Remy was arrested at the scene.

On August 16, Remy was arraigned in Waltham District Court on charges of murder and assault. He pleaded not guilty and was ordered held without bail. On September 24, he was indicted by a grand jury on charges including murder, assault and battery with a dangerous weapon, and violating a restraining order. On October 8, he pleaded not guilty and was ordered held without bail.

On October 6, 2013, Remy gave his first interview since his arrest to Boston Herald reporter Laurel J. Sweet. Remy denied that he murdered Martel, calling the idea that he killed her "ridiculous" and stated "I loved her, I still love her." He also stated that he would not contact his daughter while in prison and that he hoped his parents would receive custody of her because they have greater financial means. He called his parents "very good people" and said that "none of this is their fault."

On May 27, 2014, Remy pleaded guilty to the murder of Jennifer Martel and other indictments and was given the mandatory sentence of life in prison without a possibility of parole.

=== Custody of daughter ===
Remy and Martel's daughter was taken by officials from the Massachusetts Department of Children and Families and placed in foster care after Remy was charged with murder. Martel's parents moved from Virginia to Massachusetts for the trial and to apply for custody of their granddaughter. Remy's parents, Jerry and Phoebe Remy, also applied for custody and a trial was scheduled. On March 24, 2014, the Martel and Remy families announced that they had come to an agreement that would end the custody battle. The girl would live with the Martels and the Remys would have visitation rights. The families did not specify which members of the Martel family the girl would live with. It was later reported that Arianna was living with Brian Martel Jr., his wife, and their young children. Grandfather Jerry Remy died of cancer in October 2021.

=== Assault charges while awaiting trial ===
On April 3, 2014, Remy allegedly assaulted a fellow pre-trial detainee at the Middlesex Jail in Cambridge. Following the incident, Remy was moved to a separate area of the facility where he could not have contact with other detainees. He was charged with assault and battery with a dangerous weapon. Remy was accused of throwing scalding coffee in the detainee's face before beating him with his fists, a green plastic chair, and a bar of soap. After the attack, Remy stated "I did what I had to do–I got a child molester."

=== Confinement ===
Remy is serving his life sentence at the medium security MCI-Shirley in Shirley, Massachusetts.
