= Massachusetts Correctional Institution – Shirley =

Medium-security state prison in Shirley, Massachusetts

Coordinates: 42°31′40″N 71°38′44″W

MCI - Shirley
- Interactive map of MCI - Shirley
- Location: MCI-Shirley PO Box 8000 Shirley, MA 01464
- Security class: Level 4/3
- Capacity: Operational Capacity Med: 1,129 Operational Occupancy Med: 88% Operational Capacity Min: 326 Operational Occupancy Min: 83%
- Opened: 1991
- Managed by: Massachusetts Department of Correction
- Director: Superintendent Michael Rodrigues

Massachusetts Correctional Institution – Shirley is a medium-security state prison in Shirley, Massachusetts. The facility also contains a minimum-security section which houses less dangerous prisoners. MCI-Shirley maintains 13 inmate housing units, a 28-bed full-service hospital unit, a 59-bed segregation unit, gym, recreation areas, school, industries, laundry, vocational area, and food services/programs. This facility is under the jurisdiction of the Massachusetts Department of Correction. It is located directly to the north of the Souza-Baranowski Correctional Center, a maximum-security facility in the town of Lancaster. On January 6, 2020, there was 992 Medium and 269 minimum inmates in general population beds.

== History ==
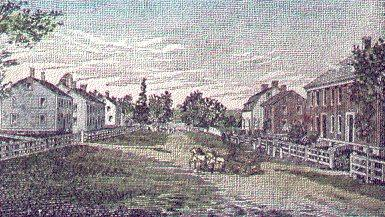
William Dean Howells, Shirley Shaker Village, an illustration from Three Villages, 1884.

MCI Shirley was previously a Shaker colony, Shirley Shaker Village. The religious order sold the property to the Commonwealth of Massachusetts in 1903. It opened as a reform school in 1908, and was later adapted as a medium-security prison.

== COVID-19 ==
Pursuant to the Supreme Judicial Court's April 3, 2020 Opinion and Order in the Committee for Public Counsel Services v. Chief Justice of the Trial Court, SJC-12926 matter, as amended on April 10, April 28 and June 23, 2020 (the “Order”), the Special Master posts weekly reports which are located on the SJC website here for COVID testing and cases for each of the correctional facilities administered by the Department of Correction and each of the county Sheriffs’ offices. The SJC Special master link above has the most up to date information reported by the correctional agencies and is posted for the public to view.

4 inmates have died due to Covid.

== Inmates ==
- Thomas Junta: 2002-released in 2010.
- Aaron Hernandez lived there until being transferred to another prison in Massachusetts.
- George Nassar
- Jared Remy
