= Paul Molitor =

American baseball player and manager (born 1956)

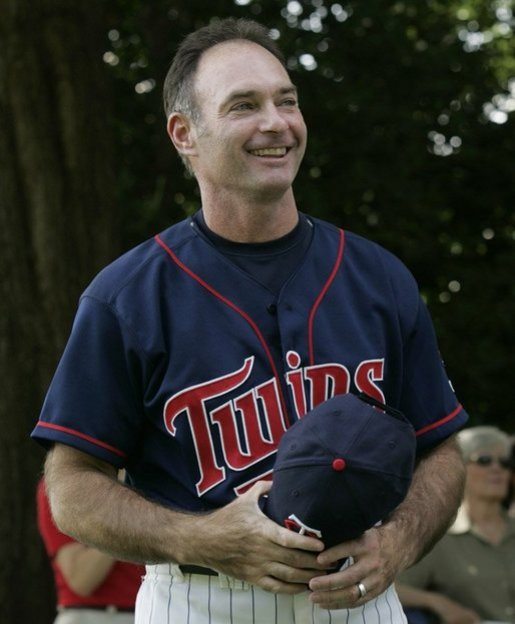
- Molitor in 2005
- Designated hitter / Infielder / Manager
- Born: August 22, 1956 (age 70); Saint Paul, Minnesota, U.S.
- Batted: Right Threw: Right

MLB debut
- April 7, 1978, for the Milwaukee Brewers

Last MLB appearance
- September 27, 1998, for the Minnesota Twins

MLB statistics
- Batting average: .306
- Hits: 3,319
- Home runs: 234
- Runs batted in: 1,307
- Stolen bases: 504
- Managerial record: 305–343
- Winning %: .471
- Stats at Baseball Reference
- Managerial record at Baseball Reference

Teams
- As player: Milwaukee Brewers (1978–1992); Toronto Blue Jays (1993–1995); Minnesota Twins (1996–1998); As manager: Minnesota Twins (2015–2018); As coach: Minnesota Twins (2000–2001); Seattle Mariners (2004); Minnesota Twins (2014)

Career highlights and awards
- 7× All-Star (1980, 1985, 1988, 1991–1994); World Series champion (1993); World Series MVP (1993); 4× Silver Slugger Award (1987, 1988, 1993, 1996); AL Manager of the Year (2017); Milwaukee Brewers No. 4 retired; Milwaukee Brewers Wall of Honor; American Family Field Walk of Fame; Major League Baseball All-Time Team

Member of the National

Baseball Hall of Fame
- Induction: 2004
- Vote: 85.2% (first ballot)

Paul Leo Molitor (born August 22, 1956), nicknamed "Mollie" and "the Ignitor", is an American former professional baseball player and manager. In 2004, he was elected to the Baseball Hall of Fame in his first year of eligibility, becoming one of the first members who spent much of his career as a designated hitter. He is one of only five players with 3,000+ hits, a lifetime .300+ batting average, and 500+ career stolen bases.

Molitor grew up in Minnesota and attended the University of Minnesota. He played for 21 years in Major League Baseball (MLB) with the Milwaukee Brewers (1978–1992), Toronto Blue Jays (1993–1995), and Minnesota Twins (1996–1998). Known for his exceptional hitting and speed, he ranks eleventh on the all-time MLB career hits list with 3,319. He made seven All-Star Game appearances, and was the World Series Most Valuable Player in 1993. Molitor is considered one of baseball's most "clutch" hitters; his .368 career postseason batting average remains the best in MLB history for players with at least 100 playoff at-bats.

After he retired as a player, he served as a coach for the Seattle Mariners and the Twins. He was a finalist for the Major League Baseball All-Century Team. Molitor managed the Twins from 2015 to 2018. In 2026, he joined the Twins' television broadcast crew as a part-time color analyst.

== Early life ==
Molitor was born in Saint Paul, Minnesota. After graduating from Cretin High School, he was selected in the 28th round of the 1974 MLB draft as a pitcher by the St. Louis Cardinals. He opted instead to attend college at the University of Minnesota, where he was a three-year starter for the Minnesota Golden Gophers. Molitor earned All-American honors as a shortstop for his sophomore year. Between his sophomore and junior seasons, Molitor suffered a broken jaw. With his jaw wired shut for eight weeks, Molitor lost 40 pounds (18 kg).

After his junior year in college, the Milwaukee Brewers selected Molitor in the first round, with the third overall selection, in the 1977 Major League Baseball draft. He signed with the Brewers and began his professional career with the Class A Burlington Bees of the Midwest League. In 64 games with Burlington, Molitor hit for a .346 batting average, eight home runs, 50 runs batted in (RBI) and 14 stolen bases.

== Playing career ==
=== Milwaukee Brewers (1978–1992) ===
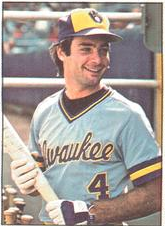
Molitor with the Brewers, c. 1982

Molitor began as a shortstop, then moved to second base when Robin Yount returned from a brief injury. He made his MLB debut in 1978, playing in 125 games and hitting .273 with six home runs, 45 RBIs and 30 stolen bases. In 1981, he spent time at center field and right field to avoid the injuries associated with infield play. Molitor was moved to third base before the 1982 season. Molitor was part of a young Milwaukee Brewers team that lost the 1982 World Series in seven games to the St. Louis Cardinals. Molitor batted .355 during the series. In Game 1, he had five hits, a World Series record. During the 1982 season, he hit .302 and led the American League (AL) with 136 runs scored. On May 12, he hit three home runs against the Royals in a 9-7 loss.

Molitor struggled with injuries for much of his early career, being placed on the disabled list six times between 1980 and 1986. In 1984, Molitor struggled with elbow problems, played in only 13 games and ultimately underwent Tommy John surgery (becoming the first position player to undergo the surgery) in an attempt to salvage his career. He played in 140 games in 1985, hitting .297 with 10 home runs and 48 RBIs. He followed that with a .281 average, 9 home runs and 55 RBI in 1986. That year he suffered a hamstring injury, returned for a few days, then reinjured it. He played in 105 games that season.

Molitor attracted national media attention in 1987 during his 39-game hitting streak. Near the end of the streak, columnist Mike Downey wrote that "the amazing thing about Paul Molitor's recent bat-o-rama is not that he has hit in 33 straight games but that he has played in 33 straight games." The streak ended with Molitor in the on-deck circle when Rick Manning got a game-ending hit to beat the Cleveland Indians on August 26, 1987. Fans booed Manning for driving in the winning run and thus depriving Molitor of one last chance to reach 40 games. The streak stands as the fifth-longest in modern-day baseball history, and remains the longest since Pete Rose's 44-game hit streak in 1978.

=== Toronto Blue Jays (1993–1995) ===
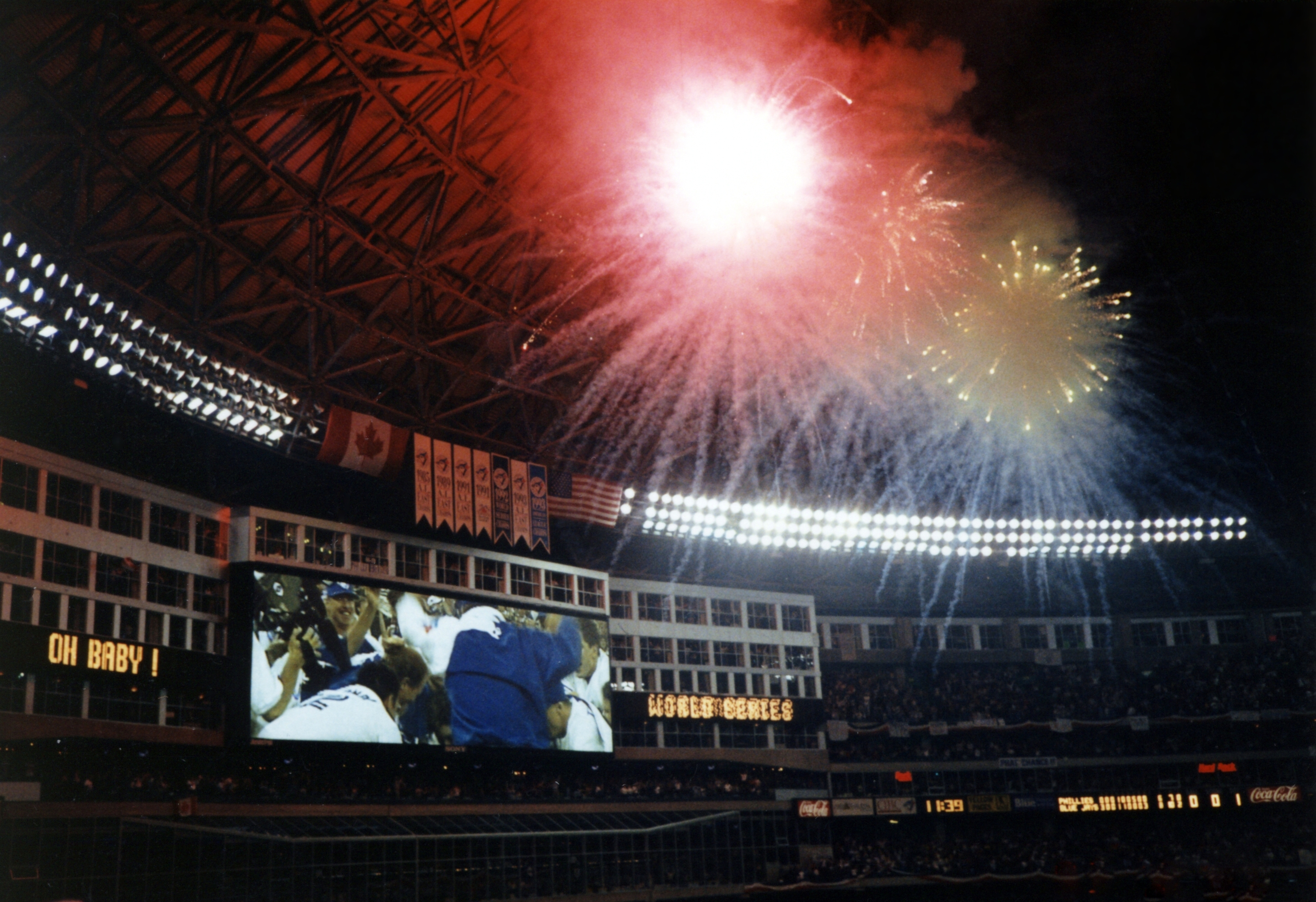
Fireworks after the 1993 World Series win

Molitor wanted to remain with Milwaukee when he became a free agent after the 1992 season. He later said that he "wanted to be a lifetime Brewer [like Robin Yount, as] there just weren't that many guys playing 15 to 20 years with the same franchise. The ones that did, you paid attention to."

However, the franchise offered him a one-year contract with a $900,000 pay cut (to $2.5 million), while the Toronto Blue Jays offered a three-year, $13 million deal (equivalent to $28.97 million in 2025), leading to his signing with the Blue Jays. Molitor's agent Ron Simon said at the time that "it became clear to us that Milwaukee didn't have the same kind of interest in signing Molitor, perhaps because of their financial situation." Molitor later confirmed this, stating that the team's owner Bud Selig had said that he wanted to resign him, but the team had already nearly topped out its payroll.

Molitor quickly became an offensive juggernaut in Toronto. In 1993, Molitor led the AL in plate appearances (725) and hits (211) and hit .332 with 22 home runs and 111 RBI. Returning to the playoffs for the first time since 1982, he was a key part of the Blue Jays' second World Series Championship. Molitor hit 2 doubles, 2 triples, and 2 home runs in the Series, earning the World Series MVP Award and tied a World Series record by batting .500 (12-for-24) in the six-game series. In addition, after serving as a DH all season, Molitor played Game 3 of the World Series at first base and Games 4 and 5 at third base in the games played at Philadelphia.

In 1994, a strike-shortened season, Molitor hit .341 and led the AL in games played (115) and singles (107). He also stole 20 bases that season without ever being caught, one short of Kevin McReynolds' 1988 major league record of 21. Molitor's average dropped to .270 in 1995, his lowest mark in more than ten years.

=== Minnesota Twins (1996–1998) ===
He left the Blue Jays after the 1995 season, and joined his hometown Minnesota Twins for the final three seasons of his career. He acquired his 3,000th hit on September 16, 1996 against the Kansas City Royals at Kauffman Stadium. He was the first player to reach the 3,000 hits plateau with a triple. Molitor was relishing the opportunity to play with Twins superstar Kirby Puckett, but Puckett developed career-ending glaucoma during spring training in 1996 and never played again. In 1996, Molitor became the second 40-year-old, after Hall of Famer Sam Rice, to have a 200-hit season, leading the league with 225, while also leading the league in singles with 167. Molitor also remains the last MLB player to drive in 100 or more runs in a season while hitting fewer than 10 home runs (nine HR, 113 RBIs).

Molitor hit .305 in 1997, his twelfth season to finish with a batting average higher than .300. In 1998, he hit .281 with four home runs, 69 RBI and nine stolen bases. Other than his very brief 1984 season, the 1998 season was the first in Molitor's career in which he did not reach double-digit stolen base totals. He retired in December, saying, "My heart tells me I've done what I can do on the field and in this game," Molitor said. "I'm happy to leave it playing my last season in a Twins uniform... Now I'm going to redirect my efforts to find out what else the future holds."

== Coaching and managerial career ==
=== Early career ===
After retiring as a player, Molitor remained with the Twins as a broadcaster in 1999 and bench coach for two seasons. He was considered a leading candidate to manage the team when Tom Kelly retired after 2001, but he declined in part because the Twins were still being targeted for potential contraction. Molitor was a hitting coach with the Mariners in 2004. He then spent the 2005 to 2013 seasons in the Twins organization as a minor league baserunning and fielding instructor. Molitor joined the Twins coaching staff in 2014 to oversee baserunning, bunting, infield instruction, and positioning.

=== Minnesota Twins ===
The Twins hired Molitor to fill their manager vacancy for the 2015 season, and introduced him in a press conference on November 4, 2014. At the end of the 2017 season, the Twins announced that Molitor would receive a three-year contract extension through 2020. Molitor was rewarded for his efforts in leading the Twins back to the postseason after losing 103 games the season prior, the first team in history to achieve this feat, by being named American League Manager of the Year in November 2017. He became only the second person to be elected to the Hall of Fame as a player and win the Manager of the Year Award behind Frank Robinson, who was named AL Manager of the Year in 1989 while managing the Baltimore Orioles. On October 2, 2018, the Twins fired Molitor as manager, but expressed that they had interest in having him continue to maintain a role with the team in some capacity. He finished with a record of 305 wins and 343 losses in 648 games. Molitor later rejoined the Twins as a special assistant, with roving instructor duties for the team's minor league affiliates.

=== Managerial record ===
As of games played on September 30, 2018

Team	From	To	Regular season record				Post–season record			
Team	From	To	G	W	L	Win %	G	W	L	Win %
Minnesota Twins	2015	2018	648	305	343	.471	1	0	1	.000
Total			648	305	343	.471	1	0	1	.000
Ref.:

== Accomplishments ==
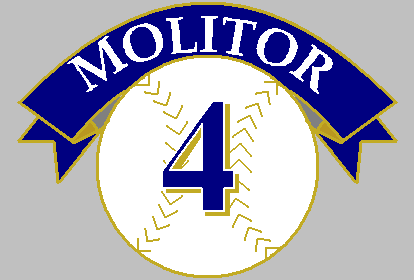
Paul Molitor's number 4 was retired by the Milwaukee Brewers in 1999.

Molitor's play was acclaimed. He was called "the complete player" by Sports Illustrated, and "the best hitter in the game today" by Ted Williams.

Molitor's lifetime statistics include 2,683 games played, 1,782 runs scored, 3,319 hits, 605 doubles, 114 triples, 234 home runs, 1,307 runs batted in, 1,094 walks, a .306 batting average, and 504 stolen bases. His 3,319 hits rank him tenth all-time. In addition, he batted .368 in five postseason series (currently best in MLB history with a minimum 100 at-bats), and was an all-star seven times. Molitor recorded these statistics while missing nearly 500 games due to various injuries throughout his career. In 1999, Molitor ranked No. 99 on The Sporting News' list of the 100 Greatest Baseball Players, and he was nominated as a finalist for the Major League Baseball All-Century Team. Molitor was elected to the Wisconsin Athletic Hall of Fame in 1999.

On June 11, 1999, the Brewers retired Molitor's uniform number 4. During the ceremony at Milwaukee County Stadium, Molitor announced that if he went into the Hall of Fame, he would do so as a Brewer. On January 6, 2004, he was elected to the Hall in his first year of eligibility, with 85.2% of the votes. True to his word, he joined Robin Yount as the only Hall of Famers to be depicted on their plaques with Brewers caps. At the time of his induction, Molitor was the hitting coach for the Seattle Mariners.

Molitor is one of five players in major league history with at least 3,000 hits, a .300 lifetime batting average, and 500 stolen bases. The other four are Ty Cobb, Honus Wagner, Eddie Collins and Ichiro Suzuki. Only Ichiro and Molitor played beyond 1930. Molitor is the only player ever to accomplish those feats and hit at least 200 home runs. Molitor is also the first player in World Series history to have at least two home runs, two doubles, and two triples in one series (1993). He is a member of an exclusive club, hitting .300 or better in full seasons across three decades (1970s, 80s, and 90s). He hit better than .300 a dozen times in his career. Including Game 1 of the 1982 World Series, he recorded eight 5-hit games and four 200+ hit seasons in his 21 year major league career. Molitor also compiled 56 4-hit games in his MLB career.

As of today, Molitor is the last Major League player to execute the rare feat of stealing home plate at least ten times over the course of their career.

== Personal life ==
During the early years of his career, Molitor began using cocaine and marijuana. During the trial of a drug dealer in 1984, Molitor admitted that he had used drugs. Many years later, he said, "There are things you're not so proud of — failures, mistakes, dabbling in drugs, a young ballplayer in the party scene. Part of it was peer pressure. I was young and single, and hung around with the wrong people. ... You learn from it. You find a positive in it. It makes you appreciate the things that are good." He says that he has been off drugs since he stopped using in 1981. He has since visited schools to lecture regarding the dangers of drug use.

Molitor married Linda Kaplan in 1981, and had a daughter, Blaire. Before their 2003 divorce, it was revealed that he had fathered a son, Joshua, in an extramarital affair with Joanna Andreou, and was paying child support. During his legal separation from Linda, he fathered another child, daughter Julia, with the woman who would become his second wife, Destini. Molitor and Destini married in 2014, and went on to have another child, son Benjamin.

During his Hall of Fame induction speech, Molitor mentioned his difficult family relationships; the divorce from Linda caused such hard feelings that his ex-wife and their daughter almost did not attend his induction ceremony.

Molitor's nephew is professional disc golfer Cale Leiviska.

== See also ==
- List of Major League Baseball hit records
- List of Major League Baseball doubles records
- List of Major League Baseball career hits leaders
- List of Major League Baseball career doubles leaders
- List of Major League Baseball career triples leaders
- List of Major League Baseball career runs scored leaders
- List of Major League Baseball career stolen bases leaders
- 3,000-hit club
- List of Major League Baseball players to hit for the cycle
- List of Major League Baseball annual runs scored leaders
- List of Major League Baseball annual doubles leaders
- List of Major League Baseball annual triples leaders
- List of Major League Baseball career stolen bases leaders

Awards and achievements
Preceded by George Bell & Nick Esasky; John Olerud	American League Player of the Month; September 1989; May 1993	Succeeded by Ken Griffey Jr. John Olerud
Preceded by Robby Thompson	Hitting for the cycle May 15, 1991	Succeeded by Dave Winfield
