= Shirley Shaker Village =

- U.S. National Register of Historic Places
- U.S. Historic district
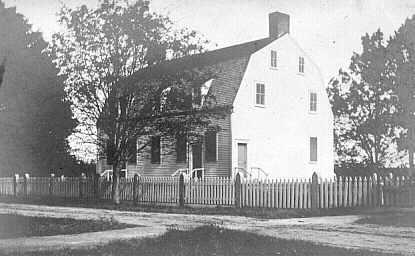
- Shirley Shaker Meetinghouse in 1910
- Nearest city: Shirley, Massachusetts
- Coordinates: 42°31′35″N 71°39′6″W
- Area: 730 acres (300 ha)
- Built: 1793
- NRHP reference No.: 76000271
- Added to NRHP: May 24, 1976

Shirley Shaker Village is a historic former Shaker community in Lancaster and Shirley, Massachusetts. Defined as a historic district, it includes about half of the original buildings and is listed on the National Register of Historic Places.

The Shirley Shaker Village began in 1793. Hundreds of acres of land was donated by John Warren, Elijah and Ivory Wildes, and Nathan Willard near their properties. At its peak there were 26 buildings; Now there are 13. Within the community there were the North, South and Church families. By 1853 there were 150 believers, or members, and the community continued into the 20th century.

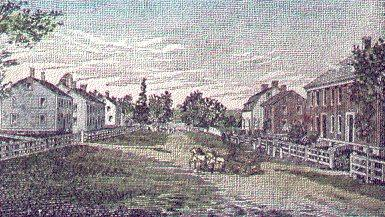
William Dean Howells, Shirley Shaker Village, an illustration from Three Villages, 1884.

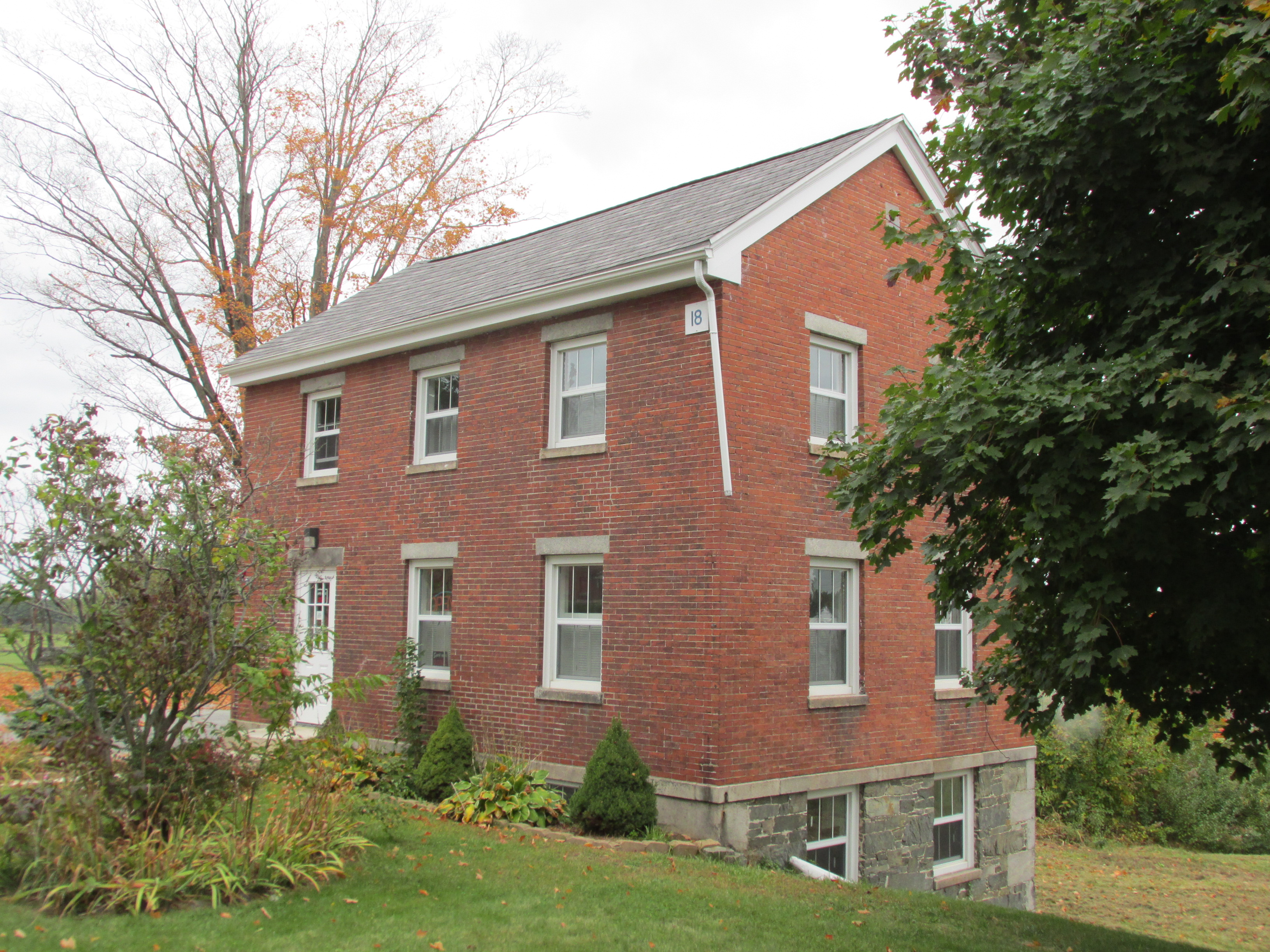
Ministry Shop, Shirley Shaker Village

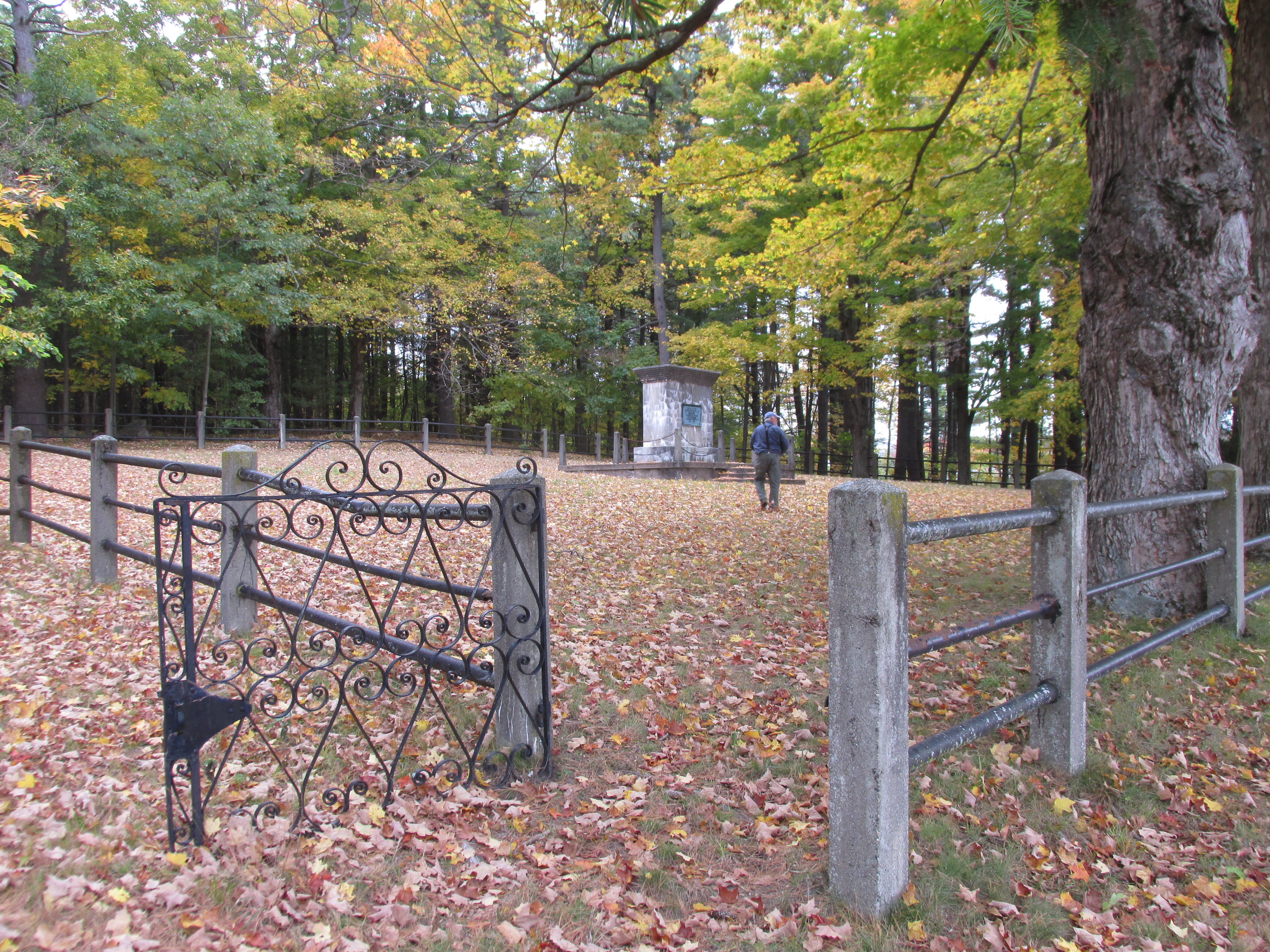
Cemetery, Shirley Shaker Village

The buildings were first made of clapboard and painted yellow and white. After the 1840s and the founding of a brick factory nearby, new buildings were constructed of brick. The brick administration building was styled similarly to one at the Canterbury Shaker Village in New Hampshire. The interiors of the buildings were described by William Dean Howells in 1875 as

"the unpapered walls, the scrubbed floors hidden only by rugs and strips of carpeting, and the plain flat finish of the wood-work. Each chamber accommodates two brothers or sisters, and is appointed with two beds, two rocking chairs, two wash stands, and a wood stove with abundance of rugs. There were few tokens of personal taste in the arrangements of the rooms."

The Shakers earned income by producing and selling jellies, applesauce, herbs, mops and brooms. When the community dwindled and they were no longer able to be self-supporting, in 1908 "believers" moved to the Hancock Shaker Village.

The state purchased the property in 1909 and adapted it for use as an "industrial school" for troubled and delinquent boys. Extensive changes were made to the property, resulting in the movement, alteration, and demolition of buildings.

In 1971 the school was closed. New construction was done on site and the total facility was converted into the Massachusetts Correctional Institution complex. A historic district, encompassing the Shaker-related resources on more than 700 acres (280 ha) of land in Shirley and Lancaster, was defined and listed on the National Register of Historic Places in 1976. The Shirley Historical Society arranges periodic tours of the former Shirley Shaker Village.

Several other Shaker village sites operate today as museums. A similar community was founded in nearby Harvard. The meetinghouse of Shirley Shaker Village was moved in 1962 to Hancock Shaker Village in Pittsfield to replace an identical one which burned and then was razed in 1938.

Today, only one "society" remains in the control of the last Shakers, located at Sabbathday Lake Shaker Village in New Gloucester, Maine.

== See also ==
- National Register of Historic Places listings in Middlesex County, Massachusetts
- National Register of Historic Places listings in Worcester County, Massachusetts
