= Shirley, Massachusetts =

- Town
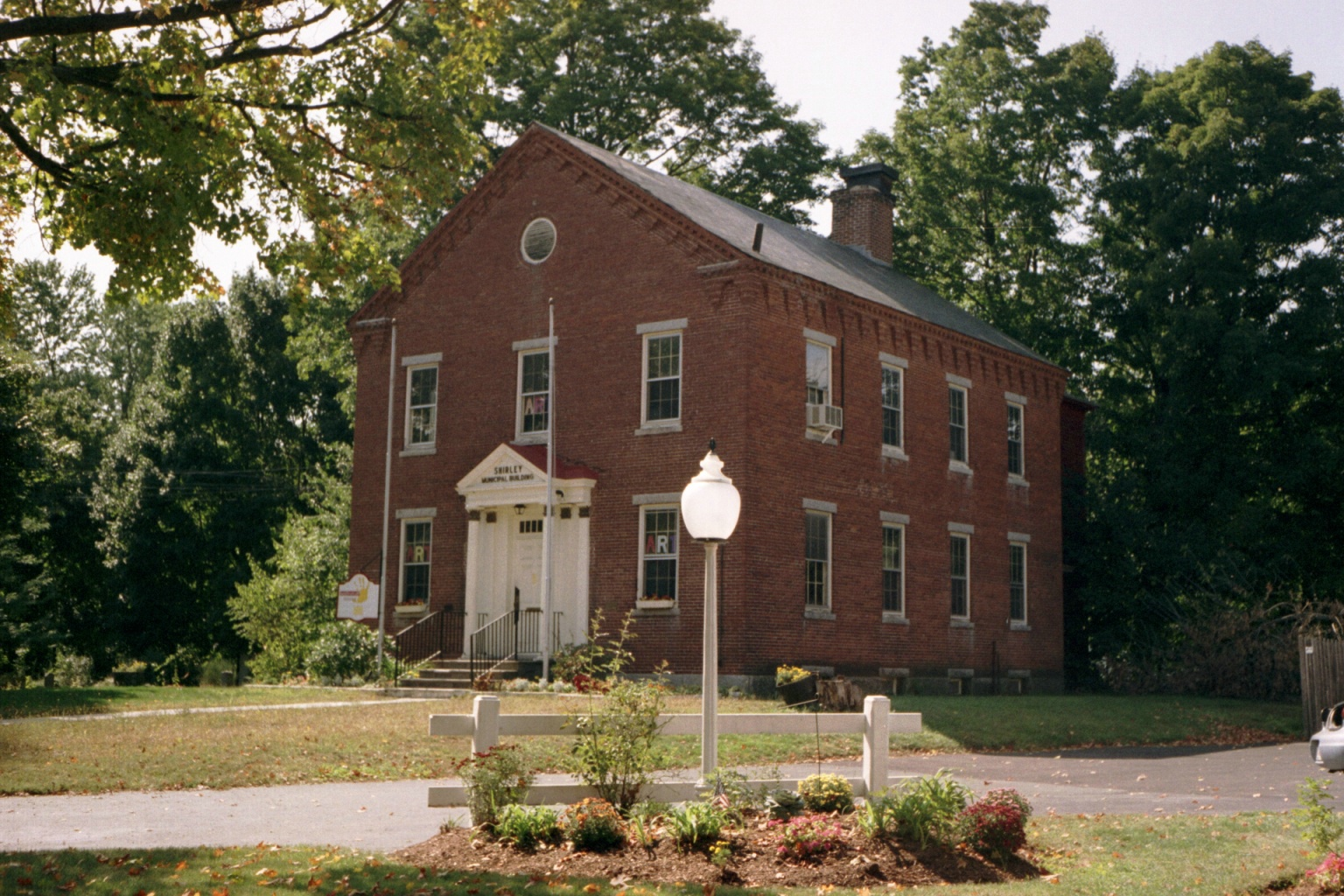
- Old Shirley Municipal Building in 2008.

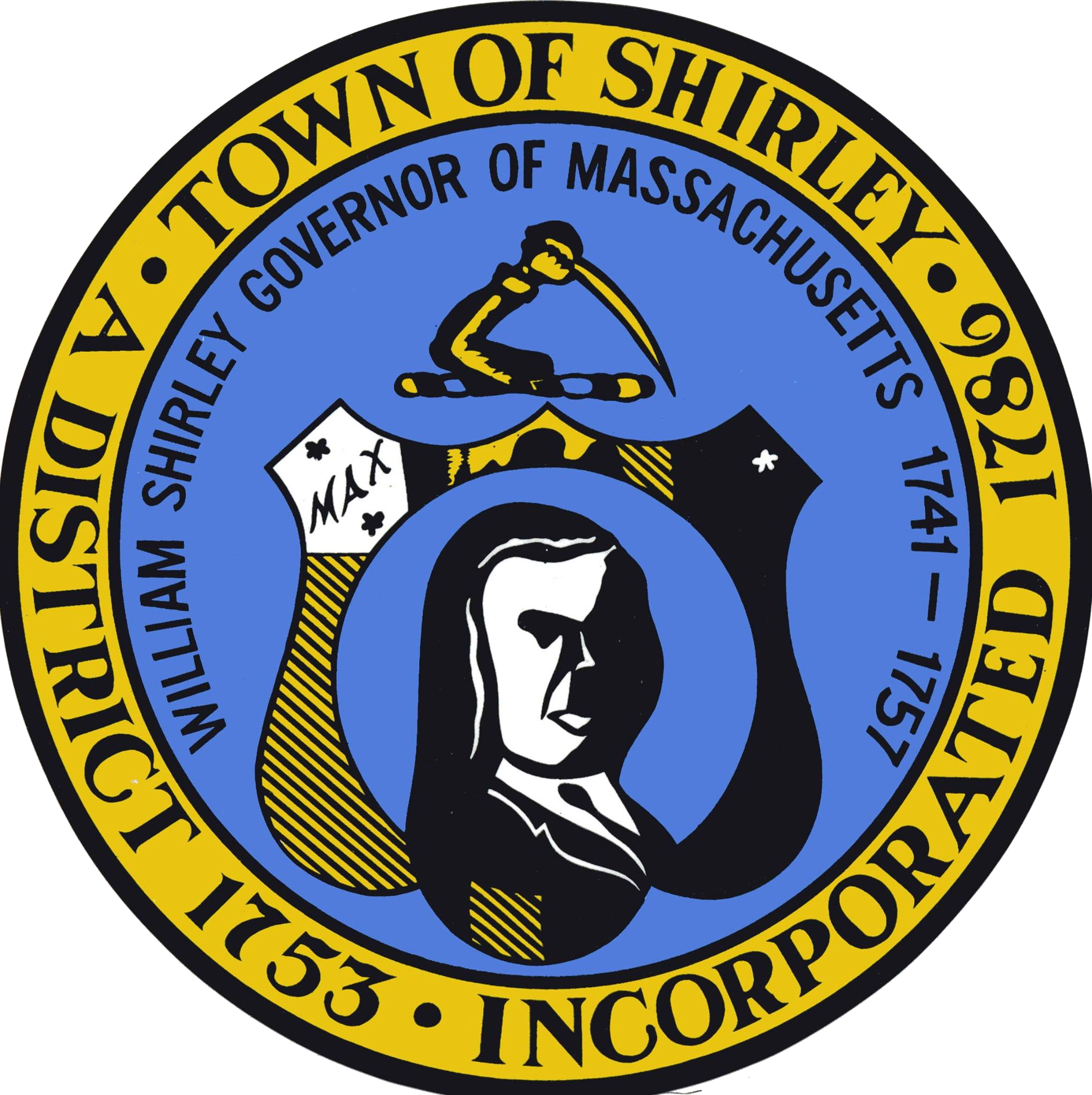
- Seal

- Location in Middlesex County in Massachusetts
- Coordinates: 42°33′31″N 71°38′47″W
- Country: United States
- State: Massachusetts
- County: Middlesex
- Settled: 1720
- Incorporated: 1753

Government
  - Type: Open town meeting

Area
  - Total: 15.9 sq mi (41.2 km^{2})
  - Land: 15.8 sq mi (41.0 km^{2})
  - Water: 0.077 sq mi (0.2 km^{2})
- Elevation: 279 ft (85 m)

Population (2020)
  - Total: 7,431
  - Density: 469/sq mi (181/km^{2})
- Time zone: UTC-5 (Eastern)
  - Summer (DST): UTC-4 (Eastern)
- ZIP Codes: 01464 (Shirley); 01434 (Devens)
- Area code: 351 / 978
- FIPS code: 25-61590
- GNIS feature ID: 0618234
- Website: shirley-ma.gov

Shirley is a town in Middlesex County, Massachusetts, United States. It is approximately thirty miles west-northwest of Boston. The population was 7,431 at the 2020 census. It contains census-designated place of Shirley and part of Devens. The town has a well-preserved historic New England town center.

It is home to the Massachusetts Correctional Institution – Shirley, a medium-security state prison. (The neighboring maximum-security Souza-Baranowski Correctional Center lies just outside the town limits in the town of Lancaster.) The remains of a Shaker village have been preserved within the grounds of the prison.

== History ==
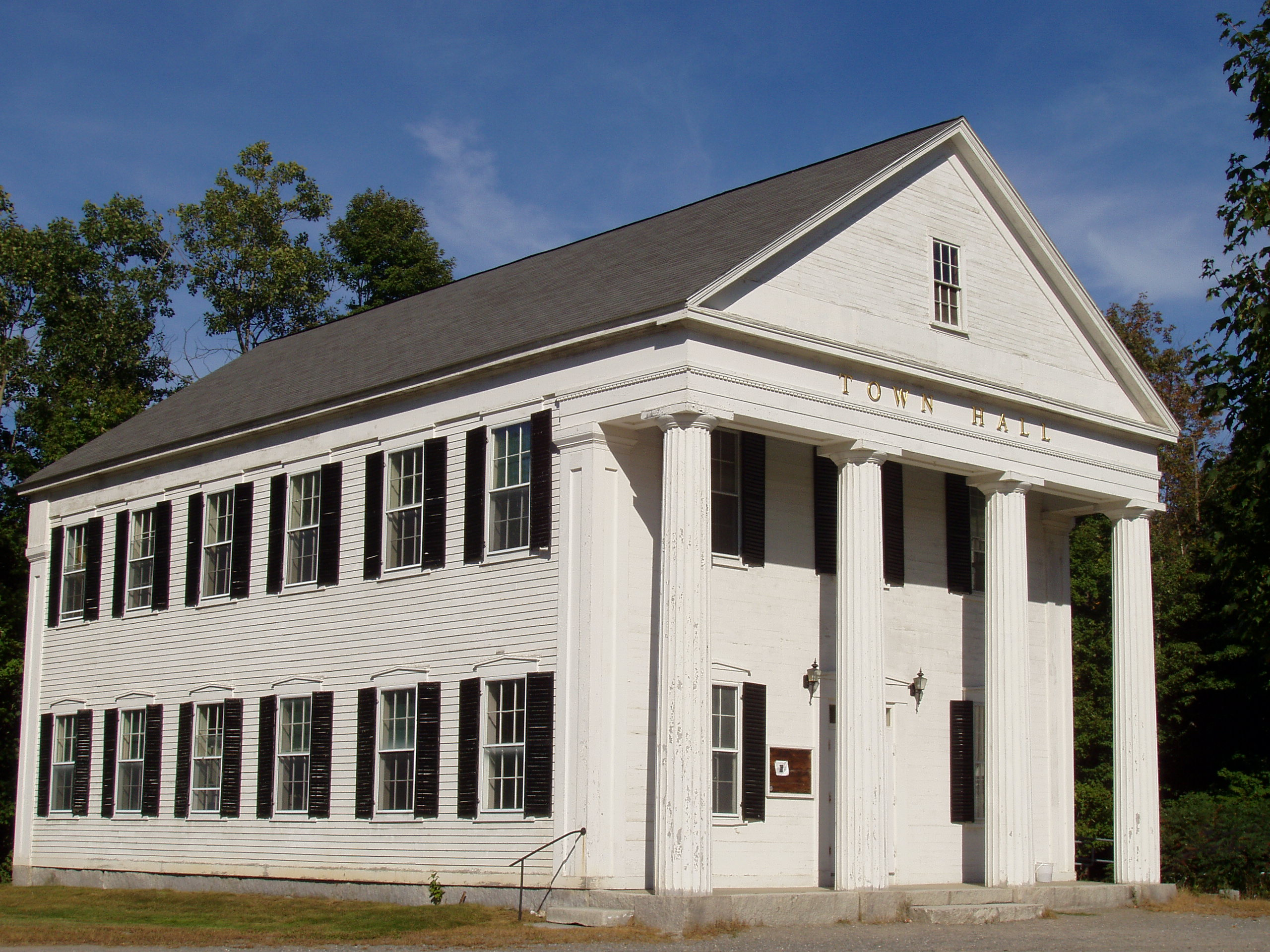
Old Town Hall

The inhabitants at the time of European encounter were Nipmuc (or Pennacook) Indians, who called the area Catacunemaug. Once part of "The Plantation of Groton," Shirley was first settled by English pioneers about 1720.

In 1753 it separated from Groton and was incorporated, named in honor of William Shirley, governor of Massachusetts (1741–1757). The town established a paper mill around 1790, and the first of seven cotton mills in 1812. Other local products included iron, nails, textiles, rope, belts, suspenders, and athletic equipment. Two of the large 19th-century mill buildings have been subdivided and adapted for use by 21st-century businesses.

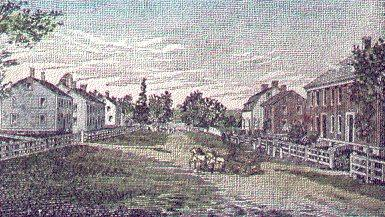
Shirley Shaker Village in 1884

A utopian religious community, Shirley Shaker Village, was established in Shirley in 1793. The Shakers advocated pacifism, common property, celibacy, and communal living. They are renowned for their plain architecture and furniture. The Shaker movement peaked in the 1840s, but gradually dwindled, perhaps because of greater employment opportunities offered by the Industrial Revolution, or because succeeding generations grew less tolerant of the Shaker church's insistence on self-abnegation. Shirley Shaker Village closed in 1908.

A medium-security state prison was built on land surrounding the remains of the Shaker village in Shirley, and continues to operate. The town also operates a Senior Center located at 9 Parker Road, which previously was a preschool/kindergarten.

== Geography ==
The town has a total area of 15.9 square miles (41.2 km^{2}), of which 15.8 square miles (41.0 km^{2}) is land and 0.1 square mile (0.2 km^{2}) (0.50%) is water. It is bounded by the Squannacook and Nashua rivers and contains Mulpus Brook and Catecunemaug Brook. Significant wetlands are Spruce Swamp (drained by Spruce Swamp Brook) and Tophet Swamp.

== Demographics ==
Historical population
Year	Pop.	±%
1790	677	—
1850	1,158	+71.0%
1860	1,468	+26.8%
1870	1,451	−1.2%
1880	1,305	−10.1%
1890	1,191	−8.7%
1900	1,680	+41.1%
1910	2,139	+27.3%
1920	2,260	+5.7%
1930	2,427	+7.4%
1940	2,608	+7.5%
1950	4,271	+63.8%
1960	5,202	+21.8%
1970	4,909	−5.6%
1980	5,124	+4.4%
1990	6,118	+19.4%
2000	6,373	+4.2%
2010	7,211	+13.1%
2020	7,431	+3.1%
2022*	6,782	−8.7%
* = population estimate. Source: United States census records and Population Estimates Program data.

As of the census of 2000, there were 6,373 people, 2,067 households, and 1,426 families residing in the town. The population density was 402.7 inhabitants per square mile (155.5/km^{2}). There were 2,156 housing units at an average density of 136.2 per square mile (52.6/km^{2}). The racial makeup of the town was 83.90% White, 6.72% Black or African American, 0.47% Native American, 2.10% Asian, 0.08% Pacific Islander, 5.12% from other races, and 1.62% from two or more races. Hispanic or Latino of any race were 6.86% of the population.

There were 2,067 households, out of which 34.2% had children under the age of 18 living with them, 56.2% were married couples living together, 9.3% had a female householder with no husband present, and 31.0% were non-families. Of all households, 25.4% were made up of individuals, and 8.7% had someone living alone who was 65 years of age or older. The average household size was 2.55 and the average family size was 3.09.

In the town, the population was spread out, with 21.7% under the age of 18, 7.6% from 18 to 24, 39.2% from 25 to 44, 22.3% from 45 to 64, and 9.2% who were 65 years of age or older. The median age was 37 years. For every 100 females, there were 137.8 males. For every 100 females age 18 and over, there were 151.8 males.

The median income for a household in the town was $53,344, and the median income for a family was $66,250. Males had a median income of $42,078 versus $32,130 for females. The per capita income for the town was $20,556. About 1.9% of families and 3.3% of the population were below the poverty line, including 2.1% of those under age 18 and 4.4% of those age 65 or over.

== Schools ==
- Lura A. White Elementary School
- Ayer Shirley Regional Middle School
- Ayer Shirley Regional High School
- A new regional school system shared with the neighboring Town of Ayer officially launched in 2011

== Parks ==
- Benjamin Hill Recreation Area
- Fredonian Nature Center
- Whitley Park
- Farandnear Reservation

== Points of interest ==
- Shirley Historical Society Museum
- Shirley Shaker Village
- Massachusetts Correctional Institution – Shirley, a medium/minimum security state prison.
- Shirley Senior Center
- Shirley Meeting House
- Hazen Memorial Library

== Transportation ==
Commuter rail service from Boston's North Station is provided by the MBTA with a stop in Shirley on its Fitchburg Line. The Montachusett Regional Transit Authority (MART) supplies Councils-On-Aging service for elderly and disabled residents.

== Media ==
=== Newspapers ===
- Nashoba Valley Voice (previously Shirley Oracle)
- Fitchburg Sentinel & Enterprise
- The Lowell Sun
- Worcester Telegram & Gazette
- The Shirley Volunteer (no longer published)

=== Cable ===
- Shirley Public Access Corporation

== Notable people ==
- Simon Atherton, Shaker
- Clara Bancroft Beatley, educator, lecturer and author
- Oliver Holden, hymn writer
- Benton MacKaye, forester who proposed the Appalachian Trail
- Sarah Carter Edgarton Mayo, writer and editor
- Daniel Parker, inspector general, adjutant general and postmaster general
- Earl Tupper, founder of Tupperware company
- Jerry White, former Major League Baseball player

== See also ==
- Shirley Center Historic District
- Shirley Village Historic District

== General and cited references ==
- The source for Shirley's coordinates is "US Gazetteer files: 2010, 2000, and 1990". United States Census Bureau. February 12, 2011. The 1990 Gazetteer was consulted and the value given for the zip code 01464 was used: 42.558653 N, 71.646444 W.
